= IROC at Indy =

International Race of Champions
- Venue: Indianapolis Motor Speedway
- First race: 1998
- Last race: 2003
- Distance: 100 miles (160 km)
- Laps: 40
- Most wins (driver): Mark Martin (3)

IROC at Indy was an auto race held at the Indianapolis Motor Speedway, from 1998 through 2003, as a support race to the Brickyard 400. It was part of the International Race of Champions series, and served as the season finale each of the six years it was run.

In March 1992, IROC drivers Dave Marcis and Dick Trickle were invited to test at the Speedway. At the time, the Speedway was considering hosting an IROC event during the month of May, during activities leading up the Indianapolis 500. The test was considered successful, but several improvements would have to be made to the track before it was safe for modern stock cars to race there. After consideration, it was determined that it would not be economically feasible to hold an IROC race at the time, and plans for that event were put on hold. Instead, the Speedway moved forward on plans to host a NASCAR race, the Brickyard 400, which would debut in 1994.

After the Brickyard 400 was deemed to be a huge success, and since the sufficient track improvements had been made, the Speedway re-opened talks to bring an IROC to Indy. The event was held for the first time in 1998.

As with all IROC races, there were no qualification sessions held. Grid positions were determined on a handicap basis, with starting positions opposite to the current points standings. All cars were identically prepared stock cars, based upon the Pontiac Trans Am. The cars were prepared and serviced by the series, rather than by a team which employed the driver.

By winning the IROC event from 1998 to 2000, Mark Martin became the first driver to "three-peat" any single annual event at the Indianapolis Motor Speedway.

Due to dwindling interest, the IROC race was removed from the IMS schedule after 2003 and, following the 2006 season, the IROC series itself folded.

== Race results ==
Year	Date	Day	Winning Driver	Race Distance		Time of Race	Winning Speed	Starting Cars	Lead Changes	Ref
Year	Date	Day	Winning Driver	Miles	Laps	Time of Race	Winning Speed	Starting Cars	Lead Changes	Ref
1998	July 31	Friday	(United States) Mark Martin	100	40	00:38:21	156.386 mph	12	1	
1999	Aug 6	Friday	(United States) Mark Martin	100	40	00:38:52	157.374 mph	12	2	
2000	Aug 4	Friday	(United States) Mark Martin	100	40	00:38:41	155.106 mph	12	2	
2001	Aug 4	Saturday	(United States) Bobby Labonte	100	40	00:38:39	155.239 mph	11	3	
2002	Aug 3	Saturday	(United States) Dale Jarrett	100	40	00:37:57	158.137 mph	11	0	
2003	Aug 2	Saturday	(United States) Jimmie Johnson	100	40	00:44:21	135.287 mph	12	1	

== Event records ==
	Year	Driver				
Fastest Race	2002	(United States) Dale Jarrett	Time: 32:29.3233	Speed: 158.137 mph	100 Miles	40 Laps
Most Wins by a Driver	98–00	(United States) Mark Martin	3 Wins			
Most Starts by a Driver	98–02	(United States) Dale Jarrett	5 Starts			

== Drivers ==
In the six years that this race was contested, 38 drivers participated:

Driver	Starts		Best Finish:		Laps Led
Driver	Number	Years	Position	Year	Laps Led
Greg Biffle	1	2003	7	2003	0
Mike Bliss	1	2003	10	2003	0
Kenny Brack	2	1999, 2001	3	2001	0
Jeff Burton	4	1998–2001	7	1999	19
Kurt Busch	1	2003	4	2003	0
Hélio Castroneves	2	2002–2003	2	2002	20
Eddie Cheever Jr.	3	1999–2001	3	1999	4
Mark Dismore	2	2000–2001	9	2001	6
Dale Earnhardt	3	1998–2000	2	2000	0
Dale Earnhardt Jr.	2	1999–2000	9	2000	0
Jeff Gordon	3	1998–2000	2	1999	2
Jeff Green	1	2001	8	2001	0
Kevin Harvick	2	2002–2003	2	2003	0
Sam Hornish Jr.	2	2002–2003	10	2002	0
Dale Jarrett	5	1998–2002	1	2002	40
Jimmie Johnson	1	2003	1	2003	20
Tommy Kendall	1	1998	10	1998	0
Steve Kinser	1	2003	9	2003	0
Bobby Labonte	4	1999–2002	1	2001	17
Terry Labonte	1	1998	5	1998	0
Randy LaJoie	1	1998	4	1998	0
Danny Lasoski	1	2003	12	2003	0
Buddy Lazier	2	2001–2002	4	002	0
Arie Luyendyk	1	1998	11	1998	0
Dave Marcis	1	1999	9	1999	0
Sterling Marlin	1	2002	7	2002	0
Mark Martin	4	1998–2000, 2003	1	1998, 1999, 2000	68
Greg Moore	1	1999	12	1999	0
Ryan Newman	1	2003	3	2003	0
Greg Ray	1	2000	10	2000	0
Ricky Rudd	1	2001	6	2001	0
Ken Schrader	1	2002	3	2002	0
Scott Sharp	2	2002–2003	6	2003	0
Jack Sprague	1	2002	6	2002	0
Tony Stewart	4	1998, 2000–2002	2	2001	8
Al Unser Jr.	2	1998, 2001	2	1998	0
Jimmy Vasser	1	1998	3	1998	36
Rusty Wallace	2	1999–2000	5	1999, 2000	0
