= 1993 Motorcraft Quality Parts 500 =

Fourth race of the 1993 NASCAR Winston Cup Series

Race details
- Race 4 of 30 in the 1993 NASCAR Winston Cup Series
- The 1993 Motorcraft Quality Parts 500 program cover, featuring Bill Elliott. Artwork by NASCAR artist Sam Bass.
- Date: March 20, 1993
- Official name: 34th Annual Motorcraft Quality Parts 500
- Location: Hampton, Georgia, Atlanta Motor Speedway
- Course: Permanent racing facility
- Course length: 1.522 miles (2.449 km)
- Distance: 328 laps, 499.216 mi (803.41 km)
- Scheduled distance: 328 laps, 499.216 mi (803.41 km)
- Average speed: 150.442 miles per hour (242.113 km/h)
- Attendance: 82,000

Pole position
Driver	Rusty Wallace	Penske Racing South
- Time: 30.653

Most laps led
Driver	Mark Martin	Roush Racing
- Laps: 140

Winner
No. 21	Morgan Shepherd	Wood Brothers Racing

Television in the United States
- Network: TNN (Note: The race was originally scheduled to air on ABC prior to the weather delay, but when the race was rescheduled, ABC was unable to carry the race due to scheduling conflicts.)
- Announcers: Mike Joy, Buddy Baker, Neil Bonnett

Radio in the United States
- Radio: Motor Racing Network

The 1993 Motorcraft Quality Parts 500 was the fourth stock car race of the 1993 NASCAR Winston Cup Series season and the 34th iteration of the event. The race was originally scheduled to be held on Sunday, March 14, 1993, but was postponed by nearly a week due to the 1993 Storm of the Century that affected a majority of the American East Coast. The race was run on Saturday, March 20, in Hampton, Georgia at Atlanta Motor Speedway, a 1.522 miles (2.449 km) permanent asphalt quad-oval intermediate speedway. The race took the scheduled 328 laps to complete. Depending on fuel mileage, Wood Brothers Racing driver Morgan Shepherd would manage to conserve enough fuel on the final green flag stint to take his fourth and final career NASCAR Winston Cup Series victory and his only victory of the season. To fill out the top three, Morgan–McClure Motorsports driver Ernie Irvan and Penske Racing South driver Rusty Wallace would finish second and third, respectively.

== Background ==
The layout of Atlanta Motor Speedway, the circuit where the race was held.

Atlanta Motor Speedway (formerly Atlanta International Raceway) is a 1.522-mile race track in Hampton, Georgia, United States, 20 miles (32 km) south of Atlanta. It has annually hosted NASCAR Winston Cup Series stock car races since its inauguration in 1960.

The venue was bought by Speedway Motorsports in 1990. In 1994, 46 condominiums were built over the northeastern side of the track. In 1997, to standardize the track with Speedway Motorsports' other two intermediate ovals, the entire track was almost completely rebuilt. The frontstretch and backstretch were swapped, and the configuration of the track was changed from oval to quad-oval, with a new official length of 1.54-mile (2.48 km) where before it was 1.522-mile (2.449 km). The project made the track one of the fastest on the NASCAR circuit.

=== Entry list ===
- (R) - denotes rookie driver.

#	Driver	Team	Make
1	Rick Mast	Precision Products Racing	Ford
2	Rusty Wallace	Penske Racing South	Pontiac
3	Dale Earnhardt	Richard Childress Racing	Chevrolet
4	Ernie Irvan	Morgan–McClure Motorsports	Chevrolet
5	Ricky Rudd	Hendrick Motorsports	Chevrolet
6	Mark Martin	Roush Racing	Ford
7	Alan Kulwicki	AK Racing	Ford
8	Sterling Marlin	Stavola Brothers Racing	Ford
9	P. J. Jones* (R)	Melling Racing	Ford
11	Bill Elliott	Junior Johnson & Associates	Ford
12	Jimmy Spencer	Bobby Allison Motorsports	Ford
14	Terry Labonte	Hagan Racing	Chevrolet
15	Geoff Bodine	Bud Moore Engineering	Ford
16	Wally Dallenbach Jr.	Roush Racing	Ford
17	Darrell Waltrip	Darrell Waltrip Motorsports	Chevrolet
18	Dale Jarrett	Joe Gibbs Racing	Chevrolet
20	Joe Ruttman	Moroso Racing	Ford
21	Morgan Shepherd	Wood Brothers Racing	Ford
22	Bobby Labonte (R)	Bill Davis Racing	Ford
24	Jeff Gordon (R)	Hendrick Motorsports	Chevrolet
25	Ken Schrader	Hendrick Motorsports	Chevrolet
26	Brett Bodine	King Racing	Ford
27	Hut Stricklin	Junior Johnson & Associates	Ford
28	Davey Allison	Robert Yates Racing	Ford
30	Michael Waltrip	Bahari Racing	Pontiac
32	Jimmy Horton	Active Motorsports	Chevrolet
33	Harry Gant	Leo Jackson Motorsports	Chevrolet
40	Kenny Wallace (R)	SABCO Racing	Pontiac
41	Phil Parsons	Larry Hedrick Motorsports	Chevrolet
42	Kyle Petty	SABCO Racing	Pontiac
44	Rick Wilson	Petty Enterprises	Pontiac
45	Rich Bickle	Terminal Trucking Motorsports	Ford
48	James Hylton	Hylton Motorsports	Pontiac
52	Jimmy Means	Jimmy Means Racing	Ford
55	Ted Musgrave	RaDiUs Motorsports	Ford
57	Bob Schacht	Stringer Motorsports	Oldsmobile
61	Rick Carelli	Chesrown Racing	Chevrolet
68	Bobby Hamilton	TriStar Motorsports	Ford
71	Dave Marcis	Marcis Auto Racing	Chevrolet
75	Dick Trickle	Butch Mock Motorsports	Ford
83	Lake Speed	Speed Racing	Ford
84	Rick Crawford	Circle Bar Racing	Ford
90	Bobby Hillin Jr.	Donlavey Racing	Ford
98	Derrike Cope	Cale Yarborough Motorsports	Ford

*Driver switched to Greg Sacks for the race due to Jones having prior commitments in the IMSA GT Championship.

== Qualifying ==
Qualifying was originally scheduled to be split into two rounds. The first round was held on Friday, March 12, at 2:30 PM EST. Originally, the first 20 positions were going to be determined by first round qualifying, with positions 21-40 meant to be determined the following day on Saturday, March 13. However, due to a major snowstorm and nor'easter, the second round was cancelled. As a result, qualifying was set using the results from the first round.

Rusty Wallace, driving for Penske Racing South, would win the pole, setting a time of 30.653 and an average speed of 178.749 miles per hour (287.669 km/h) in the first round.

Four drivers would fail to qualify.

=== Full qualifying results ===
Pos.	#	Driver	Team	Make	Time	Speed
1	2	Rusty Wallace	Penske Racing South	Pontiac	30.653	178.749
2	3	Dale Earnhardt	Richard Childress Racing	Chevrolet	30.693	178.516
3	6	Mark Martin	Roush Racing	Ford	30.717	178.377
4	24	Jeff Gordon (R)	Hendrick Motorsports	Chevrolet	30.796	177.919
5	4	Ernie Irvan	Morgan–McClure Motorsports	Chevrolet	30.817	177.798
6	26	Brett Bodine	King Racing	Ford	30.846	177.631
7	21	Morgan Shepherd	Wood Brothers Racing	Ford	30.873	177.475
8	14	Terry Labonte	Hagan Racing	Chevrolet	30.924	177.183
9	55	Ted Musgrave	RaDiUs Motorsports	Ford	30.928	177.160
10	25	Ken Schrader	Hendrick Motorsports	Chevrolet	30.931	177.143
11	98	Derrike Cope	Cale Yarborough Motorsports	Ford	30.956	176.977
12	75	Dick Trickle	Butch Mock Motorsports	Ford	30.968	176.931
13	1	Rick Mast	Precision Products Racing	Ford	30.980	176.862
14	5	Ricky Rudd	Hendrick Motorsports	Chevrolet	31.001	176.743
15	11	Bill Elliott	Junior Johnson & Associates	Ford	31.004	176.726
16	33	Harry Gant	Leo Jackson Motorsports	Chevrolet	31.055	176.435
17	22	Bobby Labonte (R)	Bill Davis Racing	Ford	31.056	176.430
18	12	Jimmy Spencer	Bobby Allison Motorsports	Ford	31.088	176.248
19	90	Bobby Hillin Jr.	Donlavey Racing	Ford	31.094	176.214
20	8	Sterling Marlin	Stavola Brothers Racing	Ford	31.097	176.197
21	15	Geoff Bodine	Bud Moore Engineering	Ford	31.099	176.186
22	30	Michael Waltrip	Bahari Racing	Pontiac	31.127	176.027
23	68	Bobby Hamilton	TriStar Motorsports	Ford	31.139	175.959
24	44	Rick Wilson	Petty Enterprises	Pontiac	31.149	175.903
25	41	Phil Parsons	Larry Hedrick Motorsports	Chevrolet	31.152	175.886
26	40	Kenny Wallace (R)	SABCO Racing	Pontiac	31.156	175.863
27	42	Kyle Petty	SABCO Racing	Pontiac	31.178	175.745
28	83	Lake Speed	Speed Racing	Ford	31.189	175.678
29	7	Alan Kulwicki	AK Racing	Ford	31.252	175.323
30	20	Joe Ruttman	Moroso Racing	Ford	31.257	175.295
31	28	Davey Allison	Robert Yates Racing	Ford	31.338	174.842
32	32	Jimmy Horton	Active Motorsports	Chevrolet	31.373	174.647
33	18	Dale Jarrett	Joe Gibbs Racing	Chevrolet	31.443	174.258
34	27	Hut Stricklin	Junior Johnson & Associates	Ford	31.485	174.026
35	17	Darrell Waltrip	Darrell Waltrip Motorsports	Chevrolet	31.488	174.009
36	16	Wally Dallenbach Jr.	Roush Racing	Ford	31.496	173.965
37	52	Jimmy Means	Jimmy Means Racing	Ford	31.588	173.458
38	71	Dave Marcis	Marcis Auto Racing	Chevrolet	31.673	172.993
39	57	Bob Schacht	Stringer Motorsports	Oldsmobile	31.695	172.873
40	9	P. J. Jones (R)	Melling Racing	Ford	31.859	171.983
Failed to qualify
41	45	Rich Bickle	Terminal Trucking Motorsports	Ford	-*	-*
42	84	Rick Crawford	Circle Bar Racing	Ford	-*	-*
43	48	James Hylton	Hylton Motorsports	Pontiac	-*	-*
44	61	Rick Carelli	Chesrown Racing	Chevrolet	-*	-*
Official first round qualifying results
Official starting lineup

== Race results ==
Fin	St	#	Driver	Team	Make	Laps	Led	Status	Pts	Winnings
1	7	21	Morgan Shepherd	Wood Brothers Racing	Ford	328	46	running	180	$70,350
2	5	4	Ernie Irvan	Morgan–McClure Motorsports	Chevrolet	328	4	running	175	$45,950
3	1	2	Rusty Wallace	Penske Racing South	Pontiac	328	71	running	170	$41,550
4	4	24	Jeff Gordon (R)	Hendrick Motorsports	Chevrolet	327	54	running	165	$32,000
5	14	5	Ricky Rudd	Hendrick Motorsports	Chevrolet	327	0	running	155	$26,550
6	21	15	Geoff Bodine	Bud Moore Engineering	Ford	327	3	running	155	$23,575
7	27	42	Kyle Petty	SABCO Racing	Pontiac	327	5	running	151	$20,525
8	6	26	Brett Bodine	King Racing	Ford	327	0	running	142	$17,625
9	15	11	Bill Elliott	Junior Johnson & Associates	Ford	326	0	running	138	$21,025
10	18	12	Jimmy Spencer	Bobby Allison Motorsports	Ford	325	0	running	134	$22,125
11	2	3	Dale Earnhardt	Richard Childress Racing	Chevrolet	325	0	running	130	$15,595
12	20	8	Sterling Marlin	Stavola Brothers Racing	Ford	325	0	running	127	$17,575
13	31	28	Davey Allison	Robert Yates Racing	Ford	325	0	running	124	$19,055
14	22	30	Michael Waltrip	Bahari Racing	Pontiac	325	0	running	121	$16,635
15	19	90	Bobby Hillin Jr.	Donlavey Racing	Ford	324	0	running	118	$9,155
16	26	40	Kenny Wallace (R)	SABCO Racing	Pontiac	324	0	running	115	$10,895
17	11	98	Derrike Cope	Cale Yarborough Motorsports	Ford	324	0	running	112	$14,035
18	17	22	Bobby Labonte (R)	Bill Davis Racing	Ford	324	0	running	109	$9,915
19	9	55	Ted Musgrave	RaDiUs Motorsports	Ford	321	0	running	106	$14,755
20	34	27	Hut Stricklin	Junior Johnson & Associates	Ford	321	0	running	103	$14,685
21	16	33	Harry Gant	Leo Jackson Motorsports	Chevrolet	321	0	running	100	$17,075
22	37	52	Jimmy Means	Jimmy Means Racing	Ford	321	0	running	97	$18,865
23	40	9	Greg Sacks	Melling Racing	Ford	320	0	running	94	$10,305
24	24	44	Rick Wilson	Petty Enterprises	Pontiac	317	0	running	91	$9,645
25	36	16	Wally Dallenbach Jr.	Roush Racing	Ford	317	2	running	93	$12,540
26	23	68	Bobby Hamilton	TriStar Motorsports	Ford	316	0	running	85	$9,285
27	32	32	Jimmy Horton	Active Motorsports	Chevrolet	309	0	running	82	$7,525
28	28	83	Lake Speed	Speed Racing	Ford	308	0	running	79	$7,455
29	10	25	Ken Schrader	Hendrick Motorsports	Chevrolet	288	3	running	81	$12,240
30	13	1	Rick Mast	Precision Products Racing	Ford	266	0	running	73	$11,780
31	33	18	Dale Jarrett	Joe Gibbs Racing	Chevrolet	247	0	running	70	$15,145
32	3	6	Mark Martin	Roush Racing	Ford	225	140	engine	77	$19,985
33	8	14	Terry Labonte	Hagan Racing	Chevrolet	213	0	running	64	$11,540
34	38	71	Dave Marcis	Marcis Auto Racing	Chevrolet	186	0	engine	61	$8,480
35	35	17	Darrell Waltrip	Darrell Waltrip Motorsports	Chevrolet	157	0	camshaft	58	$16,720
36	29	7	Alan Kulwicki	AK Racing	Ford	133	0	crash	55	$18,030
37	12	75	Dick Trickle	Butch Mock Motorsports	Ford	131	0	crash	52	$6,865
38	30	20	Joe Ruttman	Moroso Racing	Ford	119	0	crash	49	$6,850
39	25	41	Phil Parsons	Larry Hedrick Motorsports	Chevrolet	29	0	valve	46	$8,325
40	39	57	Bob Schacht	Stringer Motorsports	Oldsmobile	6	0	engine	43	$6,785
Official race results

== Standings after the race ==
Drivers' Championship standings

	Pos	Driver	Points
1	1	Dale Earnhardt	619
2	2	Geoff Bodine	600 (-19)
2	3	Rusty Wallace	592 (-27)
3	4	Dale Jarrett	560 (–59)
5	5	Jeff Gordon	536 (–83)
3	6	Mark Martin	533 (–86)
7	7	Ernie Irvan	527 (–92)
9	8	Morgan Shepherd	510 (–109)
1	9	Davey Allison	509 (–110)
3	10	Hut Stricklin	501 (–118)
Official driver's standings

- Note: Only the first 10 positions are included for the driver standings.

== Notes ==
Previous race: 1993 Pontiac Excitement 400	NASCAR Winston Cup Series; 1993 season	Next race: 1993 TranSouth 500
