= Jeff Gordon =

American racing driver (born 1971)

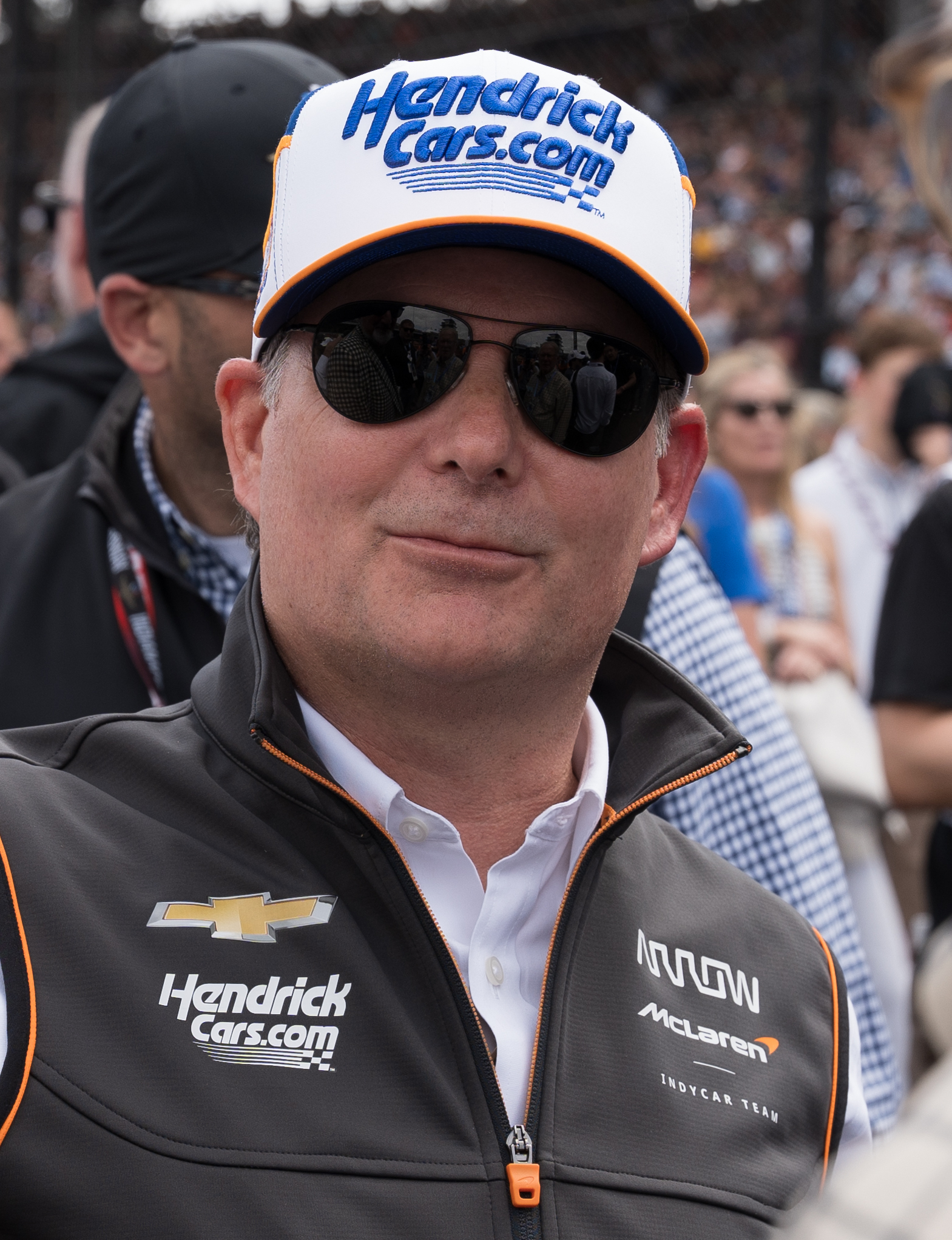
- Gordon at Indianapolis Motor Speedway in 2024
- Born: Jeffery Michael Gordon; August 4, 1971 (age 55); Vallejo, California, U.S.
- Height: 5 ft 8 in (1.73 m)
- Weight: 150 lb (68 kg)
- Achievements: As Driver: 1995, 1997, 1998, 2001 Winston Cup Series Champion; 2017 Rolex 24 at Daytona Overall Winner; 1991 USAC Silver Crown Series Champion; 1990 USAC National Midget Series Champion; 1997, 1999, 2005 Daytona 500 winner 1994, 1998, 2001, 2004, 2014 Brickyard 400 winner 1995, 1996, 1997, 1998, 2002, 2007 Southern 500 winner 1994, 1997, 1998 Coca-Cola 600 winner 1995, 1997, 2001 Sprint All-Star Race winner 1994, 1997 Advance Auto Parts Clash winner As Owner: 2021, 2025, 2026 NASCAR Cup Series Champion
- Awards: 1991 Busch Series Rookie of the Year; 1993 Winston Cup Series Rookie of the Year; Named one of NASCAR's 50 Greatest Drivers (1998); Named one of NASCAR's 75 Greatest Drivers (2023); National Midget Auto Racing Hall of Fame (2009); Silver Buffalo Award (2009); Heisman Humanitarian Award (2012); Motorsports Hall of Fame of America (2018); NASCAR Hall of Fame (2019); West Coast Stock Car Hall of Fame (2019); See other awards and honors below

NASCAR Cup Series career
- 805 races run over 25 years
- Best finish: 1st (1995, 1997, 1998, 2001)
- First race: 1992 Hooters 500 (Atlanta)
- Last race: 2016 Goody's Fast Relief 500 (Martinsville)
- First win: 1994 Coca-Cola 600 (Charlotte)
- Last win: 2015 Goody's Headache Relief Shot 500 (Martinsville)
Wins	Top tens	Poles
93	477	81

NASCAR O'Reilly Auto Parts Series career
- 73 races run over 5 years
- Best finish: 4th (1992)
- First race: 1990 AC-Delco 200 (Rockingham)
- Last race: 2000 Miami 300 (Homestead)
- First win: 1992 Atlanta 300 (Atlanta)
- Last win: 2000 Miami 300 (Homestead)
Wins	Top tens	Poles
5	32	12
- Statistics up to date as of August 22, 2026.

Jeffery Michael Gordon (born August 4, 1971) is an American stock car racing executive and former professional stock car racing driver who currently serves as the vice chairman of Hendrick Motorsports. He raced full-time from 1993 to 2015, driving the No. 24 Chevrolet for Hendrick Motorsports in the former NASCAR Winston Cup Series and Sprint Cup Series (now called NASCAR Cup Series), and also served as a substitute driver for Dale Earnhardt Jr. in the No. 88 Chevrolet for Hendrick Motorsports in select races during the 2016 season. He is widely regarded as one of the greatest and most influential drivers in NASCAR history, helping the sport reach mainstream popularity in the 1990s and 2000s.

Gordon started his professional racing career in the Busch Series with Hugh Connerty Racing, followed by Bill Davis Racing, winning three races, and began racing full-time in the NASCAR Winston Cup Series for Hendrick Motorsports in 1993. He is a four-time Cup Series champion, having won the title in 1995, 1997, 1998, and 2001, the only driver to have won more than 3 championships that has won less than 7. He also won the Daytona 500 three times in 1997, 1999, and 2005. Gordon has completed three career Grand Slams and has won a total of sixteen Crown Jewel races (three Daytona 500s, four Talladega 500s, three Coca-Cola 600s, and six Southern 500s), both of which are all-time records.

Gordon is third on the all-time Cup wins list with 93 career wins, while having the record for the most wins in NASCAR's modern era (1972–present) and the most wins in one modern era season, with thirteen during the 1998 NASCAR Winston Cup Series. Gordon's 81 pole positions led all active drivers and are third all-time, and also a modern era record; Gordon won at least one pole in 23 consecutive seasons, making this a NASCAR record. Other records include the most restrictor plate track wins with twelve and the most road course wins with nine, and he was the active "iron man" leader for consecutive races participated in with 797 through the 2015 season.

In 1998, NASCAR named Gordon to its 50 Greatest Drivers list. Ten years later in a 2008 article, ESPN's Terry Blount ranked him tenth in the 25 Greatest Drivers of All-Time. Foxsports.com named him as the fifth best NASCAR driver of all time. He was inducted into the NASCAR Hall of Fame in 2019. As of 2016, Gordon was considered the highest-paid NASCAR driver ever and the 18th highest-paid athlete of all-time with $515 million in career earnings, per Forbes.

Gordon, along with Rick Hendrick, co-owns the No. 48 Chevrolet previously driven by Jimmie Johnson, who won seven Cup championships from 2006 to 2010, 2013, and in 2016. Gordon also has an equity stake in the No. 24 team. Gordon also owned a Busch Series team between 1999 and 2000, Gordon/Evernham Motorsports (co-owned with Ray Evernham; later solely owned as JG Motorsports), winning twice.

== Early life and career ==
Gordon is of Scotch-Irish descent, and was born in Vallejo, California to parents Carol Ann Bickford (née Houston) and William Grinnell Gordon of Vacaville, California. Gordon's mother and biological father divorced when he was six months old. His stepfather, John Bickford, married his mother in the 1970s. He has a sister, Kim, who is older by four years. His younger cousin, James Bickford, competed in the K&N Pro Series West. Gordon attended Tri-West Hendricks High School in Lizton, Indiana and was on the school's cross country team; he graduated in 1989.

When he was four years old, Gordon rode a BMX bike that his stepfather bought for him and began racing quarter midgets at the age of five. The Roy Hayer Memorial Race Track (previously the Cracker Jack Track) in Rio Linda, California is noted as the first track Gordon ever competed on. By the age of six, Gordon had won 35 main events and set five track records. In 1979 Gordon won 51 quarter midget races. When he was eleven, Gordon won all 25 of the karting races he entered. At the age of twelve, Gordon became bored with cars and decided to start a career in waterskiing before switching back to driving one year later. In 1986, Gordon began racing sprint cars, winning three races. The next year, Gordon was awarded a USAC license at the age of sixteen, the youngest driver to do so.

During the 1980s, Gordon and his family had to overcome an insurance hurdle. The minimum age for driving the sprint cars was sixteen, and his persistence paid off with an all Florida speed weeks. Supporting his career choice, Gordon's family moved from Vallejo to Pittsboro, Indiana, where there were more opportunities for younger racers. In the late '80s, he drove in the World of Outlaws series and picked up some feature wins. He became the youngest driver in the World of Outlaws at the time. He also won races at Bloomington and Eldora Speedways. After graduating from high school in 1989, he quickly changed and went to Bloomington to race that night. Before the age of 18, Gordon had already won three short-track races and was awarded USAC Midget Car Racing Rookie of the Year in 1989. That season was highlighted by winning Night Before the 500 midget car race on the day before the Indianapolis 500. During the decade, Gordon also ran sprint cars in Australia and New Zealand. In 1990, Gordon won his second consecutive Night Before the 500, the Hut Hundred, and the Belleville Midget Nationals on his way to winning the USAC national Midget title. In 1991, Gordon captured the USAC Silver Crown, and at the age of 20 became the youngest driver to win the season championship. He also won the 4 Crown Nationals midget car race that season. In his midget car career between 1989 and 1992, he finished in the Top 3 in 22 of 40 USAC midget car events. In 1992, Gordon competed in the Slim Jim All Pro Series' Winchester 400, but finished 24th after crashing on lap 172. The following year, he ran a Featherlite Southwest Tour race at Sears Point Raceway, finishing 29th after suffering an engine failure.

In the early 1990s, Gordon expressed interest in IndyCar racing, but was not able to find a ride due to low funding. However, former Formula One driver Jackie Stewart offered Gordon a test drive in Europe, in what Gordon assumed was Formula Three or Formula 3000; Gordon did not perform the test due to being in contact with NASCAR.

== NASCAR ==
=== Busch Series ===
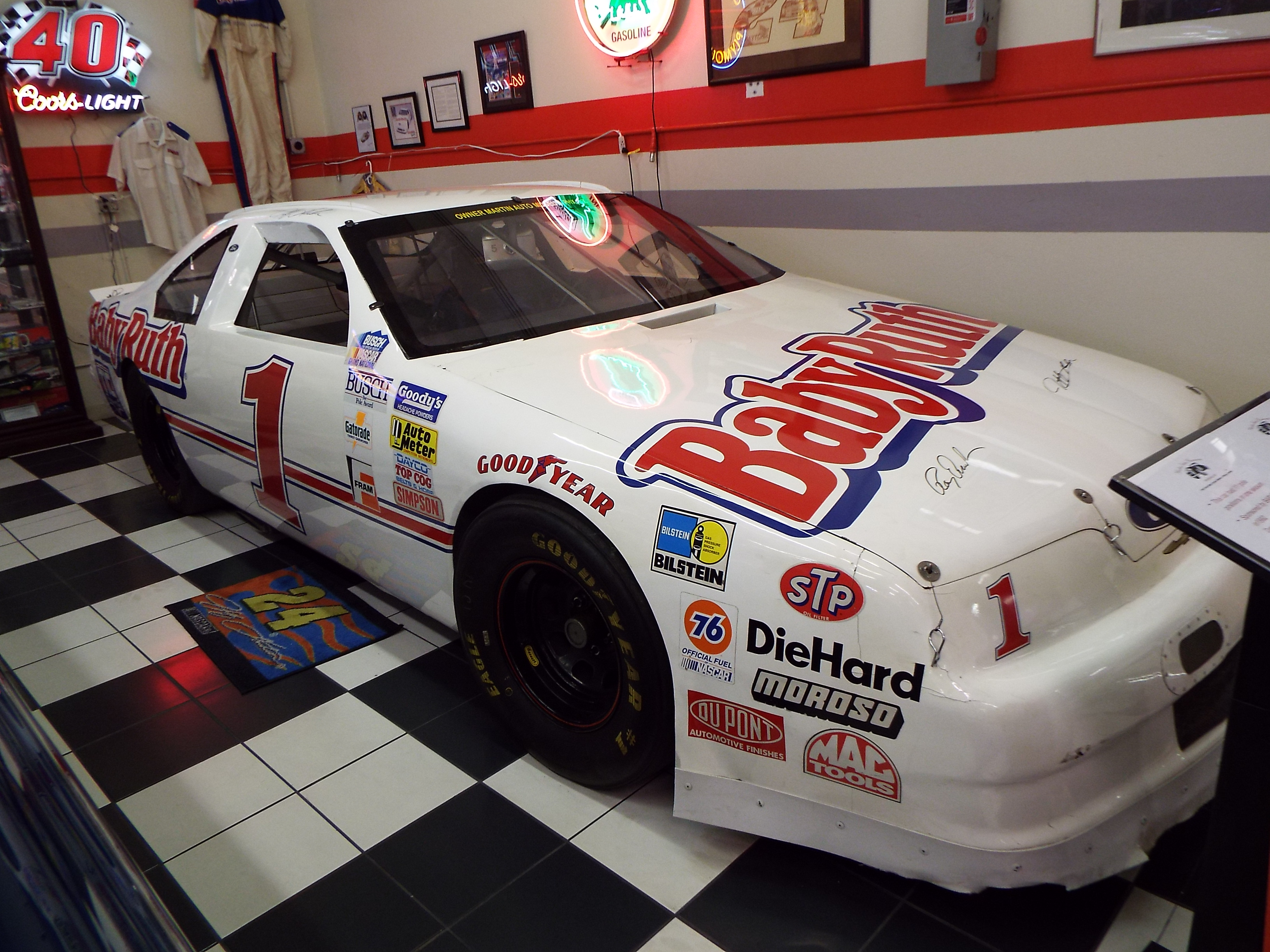
Gordon's Bill Davis Racing Busch Series car on display in the Martin Auto Museum

In 1990, Gordon met Hugh Connerty, who owned some Hooters restaurants and was also a partner in Outback Steakhouse. Connerty secured some sponsorship for a car through Outback, and they tested for the last few Busch Grand National races left in 1990. Ray Evernham was called in to work with Gordon in his stock car debut. His first Busch race came on October 20, 1990, at North Carolina Motor Speedway in the AC-Delco 200. Gordon drove the No. 67 Outback Steakhouse Pontiac for Connerty. Gordon ran the second fastest lap during qualifying and started on the outside of the front row of the field. Gordon would, however, get involved in a wreck on lap 33. He ended up with a 39th-place finish.

In 1991 and 1992, Gordon began racing in the Busch Series full-time, driving Ford Thunderbirds for Bill Davis Racing. In his first year as a Busch driver he won Rookie of the Year. In 1992, Gordon set a NASCAR record by capturing eleven poles in one season. He was sponsored by Carolina Ford Dealers in 1991 and Baby Ruth in 1992.

In 1999, Gordon along with Cup crew chief Evernham formed Gordon/Evernham Motorsports (GEM) in the Busch Series with Gordon and Rick Hendrick's son Ricky Hendrick as drivers, the Rainbow Warriors as pit crew and Patrick Donahue as crew chief. The co-owned team received a full sponsorship from Pepsi and ran six races with Gordon as driver and Evernham as crew chief. GEM only survived one year as Evernham left Hendrick Motorsports, citing tension between him and the team, ending one of the most dominant driver/crew-chief combinations in NASCAR history. Gordon extended his Busch experiment one more year, through 2000 as co-owner, with Rick Hendrick buying Evernham's half, and GEM becoming JG Motorsports. In two seasons, Gordon won twice, in 1999 at the Outback Steakhouse 200, the inaugural race at Phoenix, and 2000 at Homestead.

=== Cup Series ===
==== Early career (1992–1994) ====
In 1992, Roush Racing owner Jack Roush planned to sign Gordon, but Gordon's stepfather John Bickford had insisted that Roush hire Ray Evernham; due to Roush's policy of hiring his own crew chiefs, Bickford declined. Later in the year, Rick Hendrick watched Gordon race in a Busch Series event at Atlanta Motor Speedway, and Gordon joined Hendrick Motorsports two days later. Gordon made his Winston Cup debut in the season-ending race, the Hooters 500 at Atlanta, finishing 31st after a crash.

The following year, Gordon began competing full-time in the Winston Cup Series, driving the No. 24 car for Hendrick. He was originally supposed to race the No. 46, but complications with licensing related to Days of Thunder forced Gordon to the 24. He opened the season with a win in the Gatorade Twin 125's race, while also recording his first-career pole position at the fall Charlotte race, and concluded 1993 with a fourteenth-place points finish and the Rookie of the Year Award. Gordon's early success in the sport reshaped the paradigm and eventually gave younger drivers an opportunity to compete in NASCAR. However, during the season, many doubted Gordon's ability to compete at such a level at such a young age because of his tendency to push the cars too hard and crash. His last-place finish at the 1993 First Union 400 was a firm example of this theory. Additionally, driver Darrell Waltrip wrote he told Hendrick during the season that Gordon had "hit everything but the pace car that year."

In 1994, Gordon won the Busch Clash exhibition race at Daytona. In May, Gordon won the pole for the Coca-Cola 600, and eventually the race after electing to take two tires on a green flag pit stop. Three months later, he scored a hometown victory at the inaugural Brickyard 400, capitalizing on Ernie Irvan's tire going down late in the race.

==== Championship seasons (1995–2001) ====
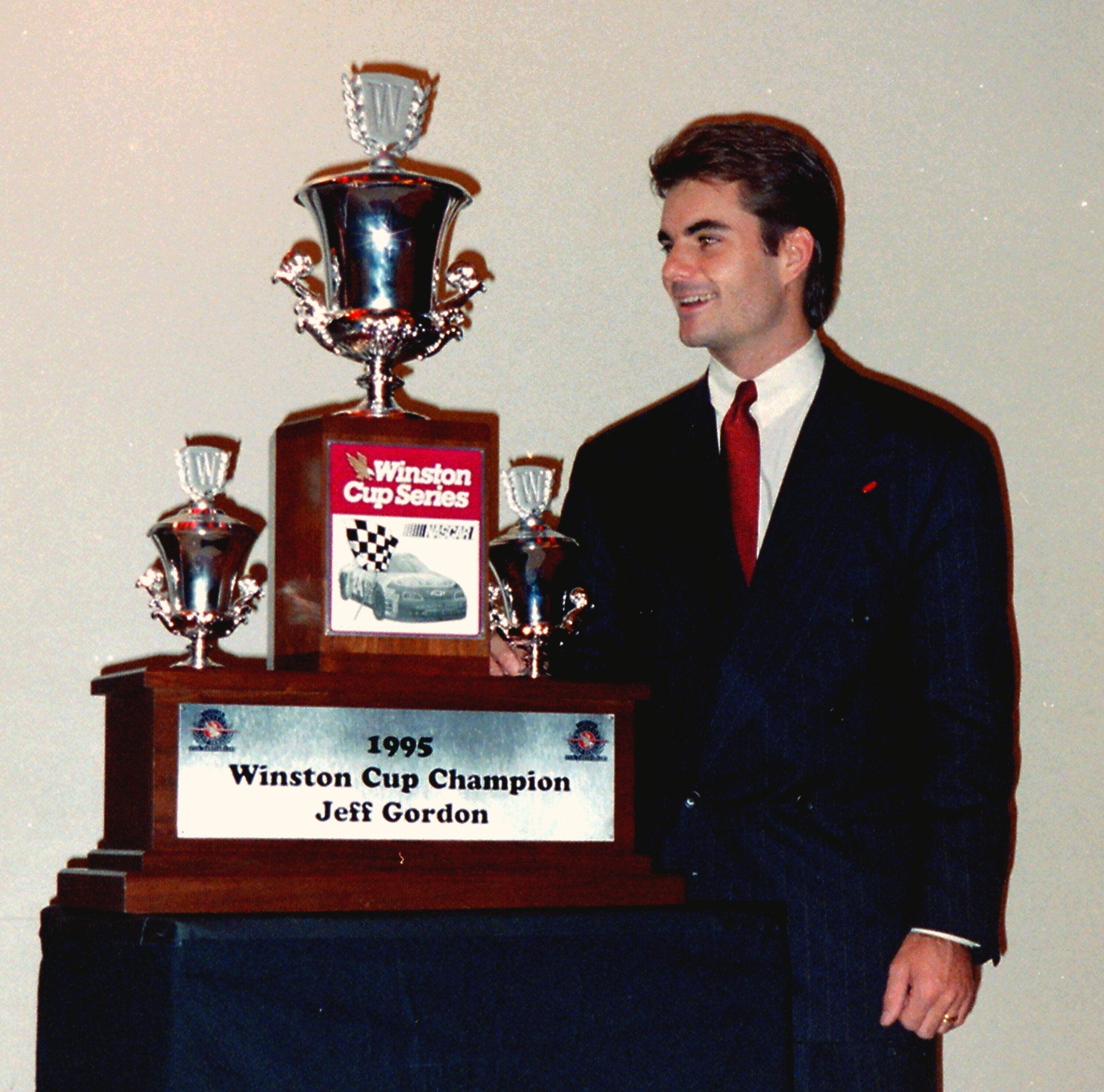
Gordon with his 1995 trophy

In 1995, Gordon won his first Winston Cup Series championship. Despite a rough start to the season in the Daytona 500, he won three of the following six races at Rockingham, Atlanta and Bristol, while winning the pole at Rockingham, Richmond, Darlington and North Wilkesboro in that timespan. In addition, he won The Winston Select in dominating fashion. He won his fifth pole of the season at Charlotte, but after the race, NASCAR officials found unapproved wheel hubs on his car, and fined the team $60,000 while placing Ray Evernham on probation indefinitely. Gordon later won four more poles during the season (Dover, Michigan, Indianapolis, Martinsville) while winning races at Daytona, New Hampshire, Darlington and Dover. The results during the season gave him a commanding 300-point lead over Dale Earnhardt en route to the title. The team's consistency was much better as well, having had three DNF's in 1995, compared to 21 in his previous two seasons combined.

Gordon's title defense in 1996 featured ten wins at Richmond, Darlington (sweeping the races), Bristol, Dover (winning both races), Pocono, Talladega, Martinsville, and North Wilkesboro (winning the final official NASCAR race at the track). After holding a 111-point lead late in the season, he finished second to his teammate Terry Labonte for the championship, losing by 37 points.

Gordon won consecutive Winston Cup titles in 1997 and 1998. In 1997, he won his first Daytona 500, becoming the youngest driver at the time to win the race. He won the second race of the season at Rockingham the following week, followed by a third win at Bristol; after a last-lap battle with Rusty Wallace. At Charlotte, Gordon won The Winston in a Jurassic Park: The Ride scheme; the car was modified by Evernham with assistance from Hendrick chassis engineer Rex Stump, and after the race it was banned following complaints from other team owners. Afterwards, he won the Coca-Cola 600, and after winning the Southern 500 at Darlington, became the first driver since Bill Elliott in 1985 to win the Winston Million. While Elliott failed to win the Winston Cup in 1985, Gordon claimed his second Winston Cup championship in 1997, completing one of the most impressive single-season performances in NASCAR history. He finished the season with ten victories (Daytona, Rockingham, Bristol, Martinsville, Charlotte, Pocono, California, Watkins Glen, Darlington, and New Hampshire). The following year, Gordon won a modern-era record thirteen races at Charlotte, Sonoma, Pocono, Indianapolis, Watkins Glen, Michigan, New Hampshire, Darlington, Daytona, Rockingham and Atlanta. He clinched his third title with a 364-point lead over Mark Martin. Gordon set Winston Cup records during the season, including four consecutive wins and seventeen consecutive top-five finishes. He ended the season with seven poles, 25 top-five, and 27 top-tens.

Gordon began the 1999 season with his second Daytona 500 win. He then won races at Atlanta, Fontana, Sears Point and Watkins Glen. Before the race at Martinsville, Evernham left Hendrick to form Evernham Motorsports, and he was replaced by team engineer Brian Whitesell. With Whitesell, Gordon won at Martinsville and Lowe's. During the year, Chip Ganassi Racing owner Chip Ganassi contacted Gordon, expressing interest in signing him, while Dallas Cowboys owner Jerry Jones wanted to partner with him to form a team. However, Gordon signed a lifetime contract with Hendrick Motorsports starting in 2000, which allowed him to become an equity owner in his No. 24 team.

The 2000 season saw Gordon enter his first campaign with Petty Enterprises' Robbie Loomis as his crew chief. With Loomis, Gordon recorded his first win of the season in the spring Talladega race, giving him his fiftieth career victory. He also won races at Sears Point and Richmond. Gordon finished the season ninth in points.

The next year, Gordon won six races at Las Vegas, Dover, Michigan (the one-hundredth win for Hendrick Motorsports), Indianapolis, Watkins Glen, and the inaugural race at Kansas. Gordon became the third driver to win four Winston Cup championships in NASCAR history, second only to Richard Petty and Dale Earnhardt (both winning it seven times), and with a 344-point margin ahead of Tony Stewart.

==== Late Winston and Nextel Cup (2002–2007) ====
2002 and 2003 featured three wins each for Gordon at Bristol, Darlington and Kansas, and at Martinsville (twice) and Atlanta, respectively. In 2004, the first season under the Nextel Cup Series banner, the team recorded five wins at Talladega, Indianapolis, Fontana, Infineon and Daytona. At one point, he had a six race streak of top-five finishes. Despite the success, the points reset by the newly formed Chase for the Cup erased Gordon's 60-point lead over Johnson. As a result, at the end of the season, he finished the season third in the points standings behind champion Kurt Busch by sixteen points and Johnson by eight. Had the Chase not existed, and assuming the finishing spots remained the same, Gordon would have won the championship by 47 points.

The 2005 season began with Gordon claiming his third Daytona 500 victory, followed by a win at Martinsville in the Advance Auto Parts 500 and at Talladega. However, inconsistency would plague him throughout the year. Despite having 14 top tens, he failed to finish nine times. A late season charge put him in position to qualify for the Chase, but in the last race before the Chase at Richmond, Gordon made contact with the turn 2 wall and failed to qualify for the Chase. Loomis left the team on September 14, and Steve Letarte, Gordon's car chief, took over for the Chase-opening race at Loudon. Gordon eventually won at Martinsville in the Subway 500. It was Gordon's first time outside the top ten in the point standings since 1993. Gordon also finished the season with a career-low eight top-five finishes.

Gordon only recorded two wins in 2006 at Infineon and Chicagoland, while also recording only two poles at Dover and Phoenix's second dates. The next year, his performance improved greatly, winning six races and seven poles. Gordon's first win of 2007 was at Phoenix, tying Darrell Waltrip's modern-day record of 59 poles, followed by tying Dale Earnhardt for sixth all-time in overall number of Cup wins. At Talladega, he recorded his 77th career Nextel Cup victory, to the dismay of the fans, who began throwing beer cans at Gordon's car. Gordon would win five more times during the season, at Darlington, Pocono, Talladega and Charlotte; Gordon's seven poles occurred at Fontana, Bristol, four consecutive at Texas, Phoenix, Talladega and Richmond, Daytona, Watkins Glen, Michigan and Martinsville. However, Gordon finished the Chase second in the standings to HMS teammate Jimmie Johnson by 77 points. Gordon finished the year with 30 top tens, setting a new modern era Nextel Cup Series record. By August 12, Gordon had finished outside the top-ten in only three of 23 races so far. This marked the second time that Gordon lost a championship because of the Chase points system. He ended the regular season 312 points ahead of second place in the standings, but since he had less wins than Johnson, he started behind him in the Chase. Had the Chase not existed, Gordon would have won the championship by 353 points.

==== Early Sprint Cup (2008–2013) ====
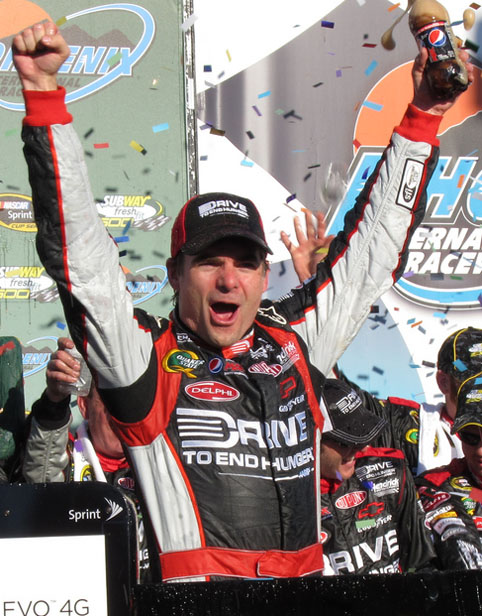
Gordon after his victory at Phoenix in 2011

From 2008 to 2010, Gordon struggled, recording just one win during the three seasons at the Samsung 500, his first win at Texas Motor Speedway. In the three-year timespan, Gordon recorded six total poles, including four in 2008, and a third-place points finish in 2009 behind HMS teammates Mark Martin and champion Johnson. During the 2009 season, Gordon became the first driver in NASCAR history to pass US$100 million in career winnings.

Martin's crew chief Alan Gustafson joined Gordon in 2011 after Steve Letarte was reassigned to Dale Earnhardt Jr.'s team. In the second race of the year at Phoenix, Gordon won for the first time in 66 races; At the Aaron's 499, Gordon broke the tie for the third-most poles with Cale Yarborough. At Pocono, he tied Bill Elliott for the most wins at the track with five, and at Atlanta, he defeated Johnson to claim his 85th career win, third-most of all time behind Richard Petty and David Pearson. Gordon became the winningest driver in the modern era of the sport, passing Darrell Waltrip.

Gordon struggled during the early portion of the 2012 season, despite a pole at Talladega, failing to reach the top ten in points. In the 2012 Budweiser Shootout at Daytona on February 18, Gordon was involved in a crash with two laps to go, rolling his car after a collision with Kurt Busch and Jamie McMurray. At Pocono, Gordon took advantage of teammate Jimmie Johnson's right-rear tire failure on a late restart just immediately before an expected large thunderstorm rained onto the track, thus giving him his 86th Cup victory and sixth at the track, surpassing Elliott for the most wins at the track. At Richmond, despite troubles early in the race that mired him a lap down, Gordon rallied to finish second to Clint Bowyer, and made his eighth Chase for the Sprint Cup. At the November Phoenix race, Gordon was running near the front until Bowyer again made contact and forced him into the wall. Gordon then cut a tire when trying to retaliate and was penalized with a black-flag for both his attempt at retaliation and failing to come down pit road to fix his tire. In reply to the black-flag Gordon retaliated by intentionally wrecking Bowyer, collecting Joey Logano and Aric Almirola in the process, thus ending Bowyer's hopes to win the Cup title. The two crews began brawling while a furious Bowyer climbed out of his car. Bowyer frantically sprinted to Gordon's hauler, but he was restrained by officials just in front of Gordon. Gordon was fined $100,000, docked 25 points, and placed on probation until December 31. He recovered from his penalty by winning the season finale, the Ford EcoBoost 400, the next week for the 87th Sprint Cup victory of his career.

In 2013, Gordon made his seven-hundredth consecutive Cup start in the Bojangles' Southern 500; Gordon finished third, marking his three-hundredth career top-five finish. At Dover, Gordon finished 3rd, tying David Pearson for third all-time in top-five finishes with 301. In qualifying for the Federated Auto Parts 400, Gordon set a track record with a lap speed of 130.599 mph (210.179 km/h) and a time of 20.674 seconds for his first pole of 2013 and fifth at Richmond, breaking the tie with Mark Martin for most poles at the track among active drivers. Gordon's winning a pole in 21 consecutive seasons set a NASCAR record. However, despite finishing 8th, Gordon was winless and was knocked out of the Chase initially by finishing one point behind Joey Logano. On September 13, it was announced that Gordon would be added into the Chase after it was found that Logano's team had collaborated with David Gilliland's Front Row Motorsports team for Gilliland to give up a spot to Logano so that Logano could secure his tenth-place position over Gordon. At the Martinsville race, Gordon won his first race of 2013 and first at Martinsville since 2005.

==== Final seasons (2014–2016) ====
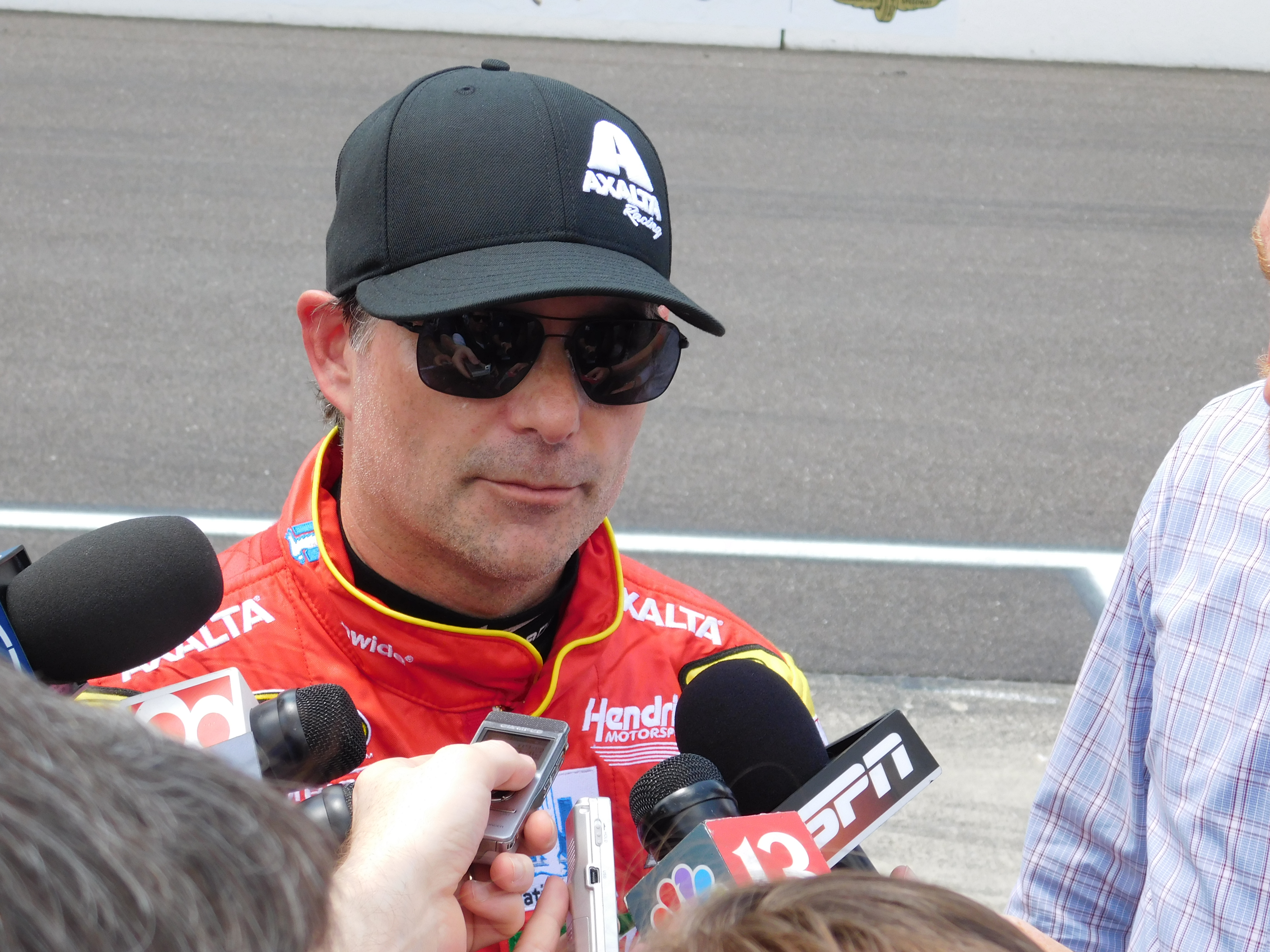
Gordon at the 2016 Brickyard 400, his first race since his retirement

In 2014, Gordon recorded four wins, starting at the May Kansas race; 2007 was the last time he had won at least four times in a season. Entering the Brickyard 400, the twenty-year anniversary of his first career win in the 1994 race, the day was declared "Jeff Gordon Day" by Indianapolis mayor Greg Ballard. Gordon passed teammate Kasey Kahne with seventeen laps to go to win, breaking a tie with teammate Jimmie Johnson for most wins in the event, and tied with former Formula One driver Michael Schumacher for the most wins at Indianapolis. Gordon also won at Michigan and Dover, his first wins at the tracks since 2001. At Texas, Gordon and Keselowski were racing for the win when Keselowski tried to shoot between Johnson and Gordon, which cut Gordon's left rear tire and spun him out. Gordon fell to 29th, while Keselowski would finish third. Following the race, Gordon confronted Keselowski in pit road over the incident with both drivers being surrounded by their pit crews. However, it escalated into a brawl due to Keselowski being shoved from behind by Harvick, who had also battled with Keselowski in the final laps. Later, Gordon would admit that his anger was fueled by disappointment in the chances of another possible championship slipping away. Despite the four wins, Gordon was unable to compete for the championship after being eliminated from Chase contention in the penultimate race at Phoenix, falling behind by 1 point. Gordon won the pole for the final race at Homestead, and led a race-high 161 laps, but the decision to pit with thirteen laps to go relegated him to 24th, and he finished tenth. The finish marked his 454th top-ten, surpassing Mark Martin for second in all-time top tens, behind Richard Petty's 712. It is often discussed inside the NASCAR community that had the Chase system not been in place, Gordon would have clinched his seventh championship in 2014 under the original Winston Cup points system.

On January 22, 2015, Gordon announced that 2015 would be his last season as a full-time driver, but stated it was not necessarily a complete retirement, and that he wouldn't be opposed to racing in occasional events. He started the season by winning the pole for his final Daytona 500, but crashed on the final lap, finishing 33rd. Gordon won two additional poles by sweeping the Talladega races. In November, Gordon claimed his first win of 2015, winning his ninth career Martinsville race in the Goody's Headache Relief Shot 500, advancing him to the Championship Four at Homestead. This would be his only win of 2015, and his 93rd and final win of his NASCAR career. In his final race as a full-time competitor at the 2015 Ford EcoBoost 400, Gordon finished 6th, falling just short of his quest for the fifth championship of his career.

Gordon returned to the Cup Series in 2016 at the Brickyard 400, driving the No. 88 as a substitute for the injured Dale Earnhardt Jr. He also ran at Pocono, Watkins Glen, and Bristol. On September 2, it was announced that Earnhardt would be out for the remainder of the season and Gordon would fill in at the Darlington, Richmond, Dover, and Martinsville races. He recorded his best finish of the season at Martinsville, one year after scoring his final win at the same race, with a sixth-place run, his final race in NASCAR.

=== Other racing ===
Gordon has participated in the Race of Champions three times, including a Nations Cup-winning drive with Team USA's Jimmie Johnson and Colin Edwards at the 2002 event in Gran Canaria. Prior to the ROC, Gordon competed in an ROC America event, losing to Kenny Bräck after crashing. Afterwards, Gordon defeated Johnson by one sixteen-hundredth of a second. Later in the day, Gordon rode with rally driver Marcus Grönholm around the course, both eventually flipping. In the ROC's first round, Gordon (2:03.03) lost to 2002 CART champion Cristiano da Matta, but in round two, Gordon (1:53.47) defeated Formula One's Fernando Alonso. In the semi-finals, Gordon (1:53.20) won against CART driver Sébastien Bourdais, and in the finals, Gordon (1:53.87) triumphed against European Touring Car Championship driver Fabrizio Giovanardi. He was slated to run it again in 2004 against seven-time F1 World Champion Michael Schumacher but was sidelined by the flu, and Casey Mears took his place. In 2005, Gordon competed in the Race of Champions event again, this time held in Paris, France, where he was partnered with motocross racer/X Games winner Travis Pastrana.

In 1999, sports columnist Mike Bianchi remarked on Gordon's success at Daytona International Speedway: "The only reason he hasn't won the Rolex 24 is because he's never raced in it." Gordon ultimately competed in the 24-hour sports car endurance race twice in his career. In 2007, Gordon made his debut in the Rolex 24 as a co-driver of the No. 10 SunTrust Pontiac-Riley for Wayne Taylor Racing. His teammates consisted of Max Angelelli, Jan Magnussen, and Wayne Taylor. His team finished third, two laps behind the winning team of Juan Pablo Montoya, Scott Pruett, and Salvador Durán. Gordon made his return to the Rolex 24 in 2017, partnering with Wayne Taylor Racing once again. He drove the No. 10 Cadillac alongside Angelelli, Jordan and Ricky Taylor for the event. Early in the race, Gordon made contact with Tom Long, spinning Long's No. 70 out. Despite the incident, the No. 10 team was able to hold off Filipe Albuquerque's No. 5 car to win the overall class, making Gordon the fourth driver to win both the Daytona 500 and the Rolex 24. Gordon drove the car for a total of two hours and 34 minutes.

Gordon ran in the International Race of Champions from 1995 to 2000. Gordon won one race at Daytona in 1998. In the race, Gordon led only two laps, but was the race leader by lap 30. Despite being invited for the 2002 season, Gordon declined due to time constraints. Gordon competed in the revived IROC series in 2026, and swept the weekend in Washington, D.C., winning both races run in support to the IndyCar Freedom 250 Grand Prix.

In 1997, Gordon was offered a ride by CART team owner Barry Green with Team Green as a stepping stone to F1's British American Racing. However, Gordon declined, stating that there are "just too many steps" to reach F1. On June 11, 2003, Gordon went to Indianapolis Motor Speedway to take part in a test with then-WilliamsF1 driver Montoya. The two switched rides, with Gordon driving Montoya's Williams FW24, marking the first time he had driven an F1 car. On Gordon's first lap, he went off-course, and recorded a time of 1:17; in comparison, the 2002 United States Grand Prix's pole time was 1:10, while the slowest was 1:13. On his second run, Gordon began with a standing start, and on his next lap recorded 1:16.5. Montoya would eventually join NASCAR in 2007.

Gordon has also participated in the Prelude to the Dream charity dirt track race at Eldora Speedway in 2007, 2008, and 2010. Gordon had been intending to run the 2009 race, but did not due to scheduling conflicts. Gordon finished third in the 2007 race, fourteenth in 2008 and 22nd in 2010, the latter being run with Team Riley Hospital for Children.

== Broadcasting career ==
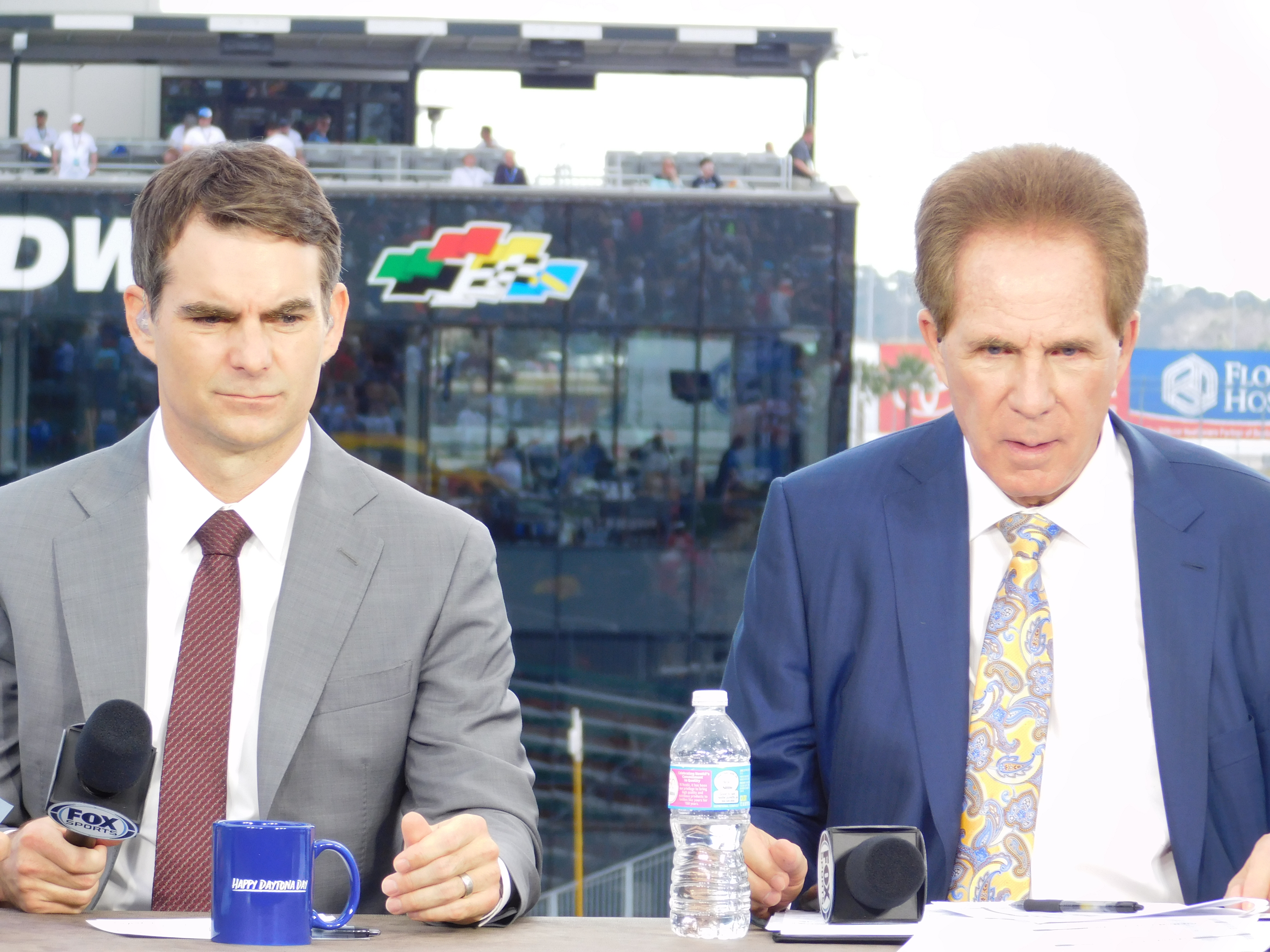
Gordon and Darrell Waltrip during a pre-race broadcast at the 2016 Daytona 500

When Gordon made the decision to step back from full-time driving at the conclusion of the 2015 Sprint Cup Series season, he reportedly put out feelers to television networks about the possibility of joining the broadcast booth. On January 25, 2015, USA Today writer Jeff Gluck reported that Gordon was hired by Fox Sports to work as a guest analyst for NASCAR on Fox broadcasts of Xfinity Series events alongside full-time announcers Adam Alexander and Michael Waltrip; the news was officially announced by Fox Sports the following day. On February 3, Gordon made a guest appearance on the Fox News Channel morning show Fox & Friends, where he stated his plans to call three races for Fox Sports.

On April 10, 2015, Gordon made his broadcasting debut on Fox Sports 1 during the network's coverage of the O'Reilly Auto Parts 300 at Texas Motor Speedway. Gordon returned to the broadcast booth for the Drive to Stop Diabetes 300 at Bristol Motor Speedway on April 18, and the Winn-Dixie 300 at Talladega Superspeedway on May 2. Gordon was one of five active NASCAR drivers to serve as a guest analyst for Fox Sports during the 2015 Xfinity Series season; the other four were Kevin Harvick, Brad Keselowski, Clint Bowyer, and Danica Patrick.

On May 21, 2015, Gordon announced on NASCAR Race Hub that he would join Fox Sports as a full-time analyst for Cup Series events, beginning with the 2016 Sprint Cup Series season. Gordon was paired with Mike Joy and Darrell Waltrip in the broadcast booth, replacing Larry McReynolds, who moved to the Hollywood Hotel.

On November 6, 2015, Gordon joined Joy and Waltrip in the booth for the first time at a dress rehearsal during the WinStar World Casino & Resort 350 at Texas Motor Speedway. The rehearsal was not shown during the Camping World Truck Series broadcast. Following his final scheduled race as a driver on November 22, Gordon quickly began the transition into his full-time role at Fox Sports.

Gordon made his debut as a Cup Series analyst as part of Speedweeks at Daytona International Speedway in February 2016. To promote his first Daytona 500 as a broadcaster, he starred in the "Jeff Gordon Police Chase" advertisement, as part of the #DaytonaDay campaign. On the eve of the 58th Daytona 500, Fox aired Jeff Gordon's Daytona 500 Kickoff Celebration, a television special he hosted.

== Personal life ==
Early in his career, Gordon stated that he was a born again Christian. He talked about how in the early-1990s he became curious about Christianity and followed some drivers to the weekly chapel one week, which is how he first started to learn more about God. During this time, Gordon kept verses of the Bible taped to his steering wheel. By 2004, Gordon stated he had "a difficult time focusing on one particular faith." When asked again about his faith in a 2015 Sports Illustrated magazine interview, Gordon stated: "I wasn't brought up [with religion]. It was something I got introduced to when I came into the Cup Series. I explored it and learned a lot from that experience. I feel it's helped make me a better person, but I choose to do it more privately now."

=== Marriages and children ===
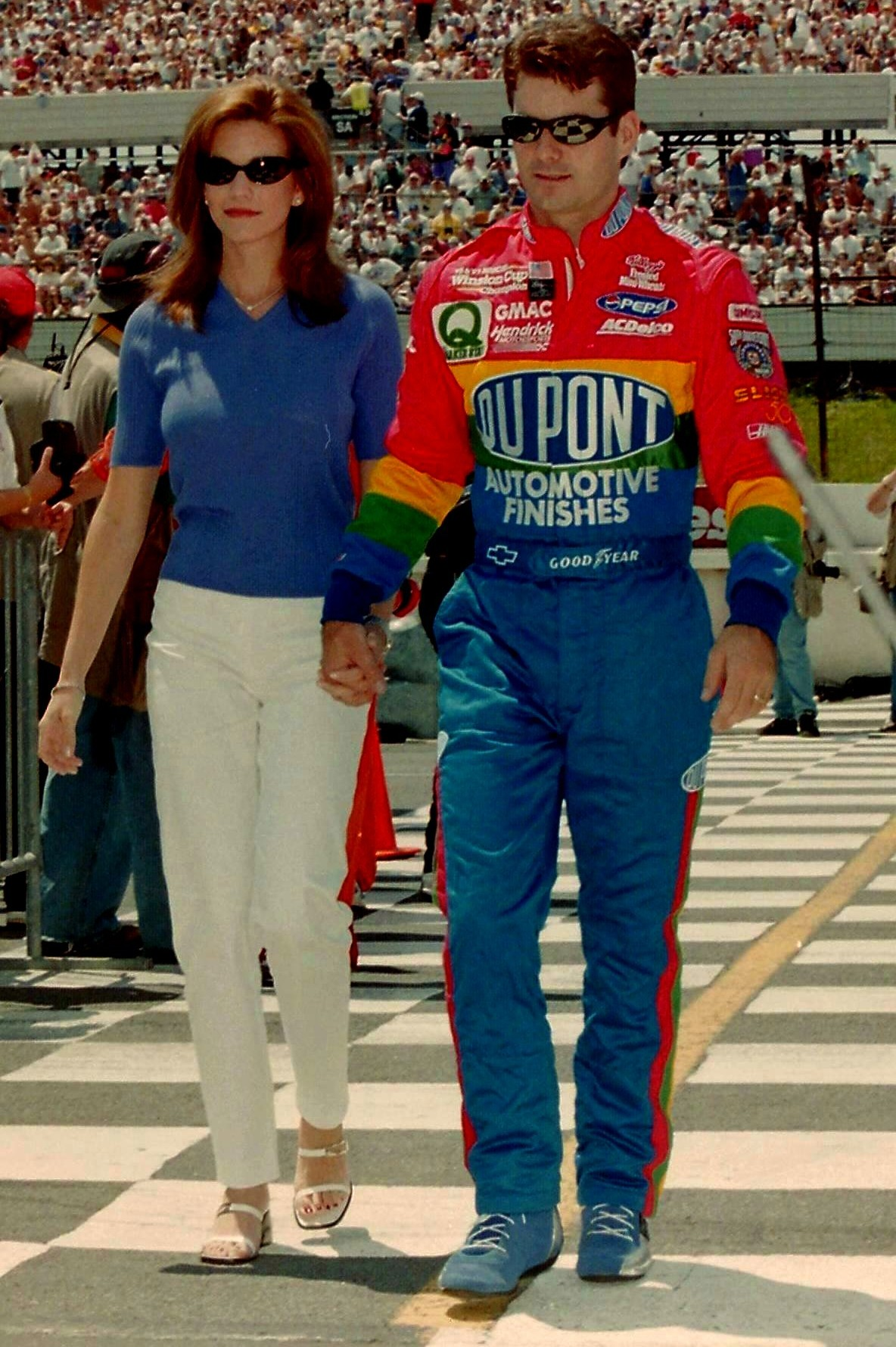
Gordon with first wife Brooke

Gordon has been married twice. He met Brooke Sealey, a Miss Winston Cup model, in victory lane at Daytona International Speedway after he won the first of two qualifying races for the 1993 Daytona 500. The pair began dating in secret due to an unwritten rule prohibiting drivers from dating the models. Sealey's role as Miss Winston concluded following the 1993 season, and the couple publicly revealed their relationship after the NASCAR awards banquet in December. Prior to the 1994 Daytona 500, a year to the day from their encounter in victory lane, Gordon reserved a banquet hall at a French restaurant in Daytona Beach, where Gordon proposed to Sealey. The couple were married on November 26, 1994. They owned a home on Lake Norman in North Carolina, but evacuated permanently due to fan intrusions. The couple then moved to Highland Beach, Florida. In March 2002, Sealey sued for divorce after alleging Gordon of marital misconduct, and Gordon eventually counter-sued. Gordon's wife, who also went by the name Jennifer Brooke Gordon, cited her husband's relationship with professional model Deanna Merryman in her divorce papers with the racecar driver. In court papers, she asked for "exclusive use of the couple's oceanfront home, valued at $9 million, as well as alimony, two cars and periodic use of their boats and an airplane." Though Gordon stated that Sealey did not deserve such a high amount of rewards, as he "risked life and limb" to gain the wealth, Sealey stated that "NASCAR is a relatively safe occupation." Sealey subsequently was awarded $15.3 million. The divorce was finalized on June 13, 2003. During the year, Gordon was seen with model Amanda Church on a beach in St. Bart's, and later moved in with her in New York City.

Gordon was introduced to Ingrid Vandebosch during a dinner party at The Hamptons by a mutual friend in 2002, but they did not begin dating until 2004. Gordon announced their engagement on June 24, 2006, at a croquet event at Meadowood Resort in St. Helena, California. According to Gordon, they had kept the engagement secret for the following 30 days. Gordon and Vandebosch were married in a small, private ceremony in Mexico on November 7, 2006. On June 20, 2007, Vandebosch gave birth to their first child, Ella Sofia Gordon in New York City. Gordon had Scott Pruett assigned as a standby driver for Watkins Glen because his wife was due to give birth the weekend of August 8, 2010. On the morning of August 9, 2010, Vandebosch delivered their son Leo Benjamin Gordon. The family resides in the SouthPark neighborhood of Charlotte, North Carolina.

=== Philanthropy ===
In 1999, Gordon established the Jeff Gordon Children's Foundation to help support children facing life-threatening and chronic illnesses. On December 16, 2006, Gordon opened the Jeff Gordon Children's Hospital at the NorthEast Medical Center. In 2007, Gordon, along with Andre Agassi, Muhammad Ali, Lance Armstrong, Warrick Dunn, Mia Hamm, Tony Hawk, Andrea Jaeger, Jackie Joyner-Kersee, Mario Lemieux, Alonzo Mourning, and Cal Ripken Jr. founded Athletes for Hope, a charitable organization which helps professional athletes get involved in charitable causes and inspires millions of non-athletes to volunteer and support the community.

AARP became Gordon's sponsor in 2011 through the Drive to End Hunger program, which donates meals to hunger relief organizations near NASCAR tracks, along with reducing hunger among senior citizens. Gordon is also a member of the Clinton Global Initiative, which helps global leaders find solutions to ending the world's pressing problems.

=== Endorsements and business ventures ===
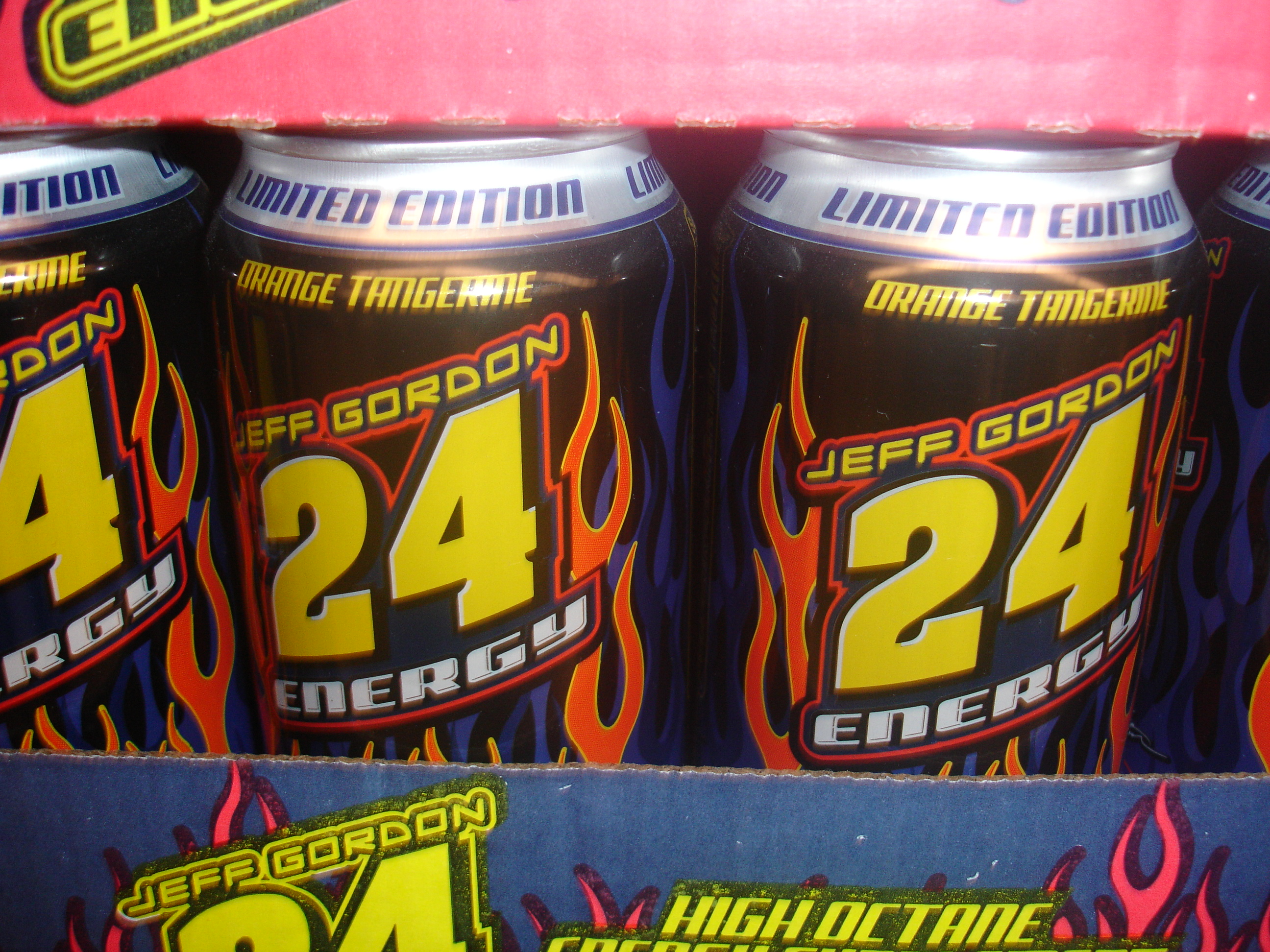
Jeff Gordon 24 Energy cans

Prior to his sponsorship with Pepsi, Gordon had been sponsored by Coca-Cola, but eventually chose Pepsi due to more visibility, along with Coca-Cola wanting Gordon to be a regional sponsor in the southeastern United States. Gordon has also been sponsored by Kellogg Company, Frito-Lay, Edy's, and Ray-Ban.

Gordon owns JG Motorsports to manage licensing, and the company received up to 20 percent of Gordon-licensed products. Such items produced $112 million in 1998. Gordon has owned a dealership, Jeff Gordon Chevrolet, in partnership with Hendrick Automotive Group, located in Wilmington, North Carolina, since 1998. With Dale Earnhardt, Gordon owned Performance Partners, Inc., a real estate company, along with Chase Racewear, a casual clothing line; the two were also major shareholders in Action Performance Companies, Inc. (now Lionel Racing), the official die-cast creator of NASCAR.

In the late 1990s, Gordon became a shareholder in LBE Technologies Inc., which was the developer of NASCAR Silicon Motor Speedway, a sim racing attraction based on a full motion platform.

In May 2005, Gordon announced a partnership with Bob Lutz to form the Jeff Gordon Racing School, a stock car racing experience for fans which began its operations at Lowe's Motor Speedway in August that year. In 2009, Lutz rebranded the school as NASCAR Racing Experience. In 2007, PepsiCo introduced Jeff Gordon 24 Energy, an orange tangerine-flavored energy drink, which has since been discontinued.

In October 2005, Gordon started a line of wine with Briggs & Sons Winemaking, Co., debuting with a 2004 Carneros Chardonnay, followed by Merlot and Cabernet Sauvignon in January 2007. Eventually, the 2007 Ella Sofia Napa Valley Joie de Vivre won double gold medals at the 2011 Indy International Wine Competition.

In 2012, Gordon became the designer of the Canadian Motor Speedway in Fort Erie, Ontario, which will be the largest track in Canada. Gordon's stepfather, John Bickford, serves as the general manager of the project. Also since 2012, Gordon has been sponsored by DVX Sun and Safety Sunglass, which are constructed with elastomer from DuPont.

On February 12, 2015, Gordon was hired by sponsor Axalta Coating Systems as global business advisor, working in the automotive refinishing, OEM, commercial vehicle and industrial business departments.

In 2016, Gordon signed with Creative Artists Agency as their client. He was previously represented by Just Marketing International, International Management Group, and William Morris Agency.

== Career achievements ==
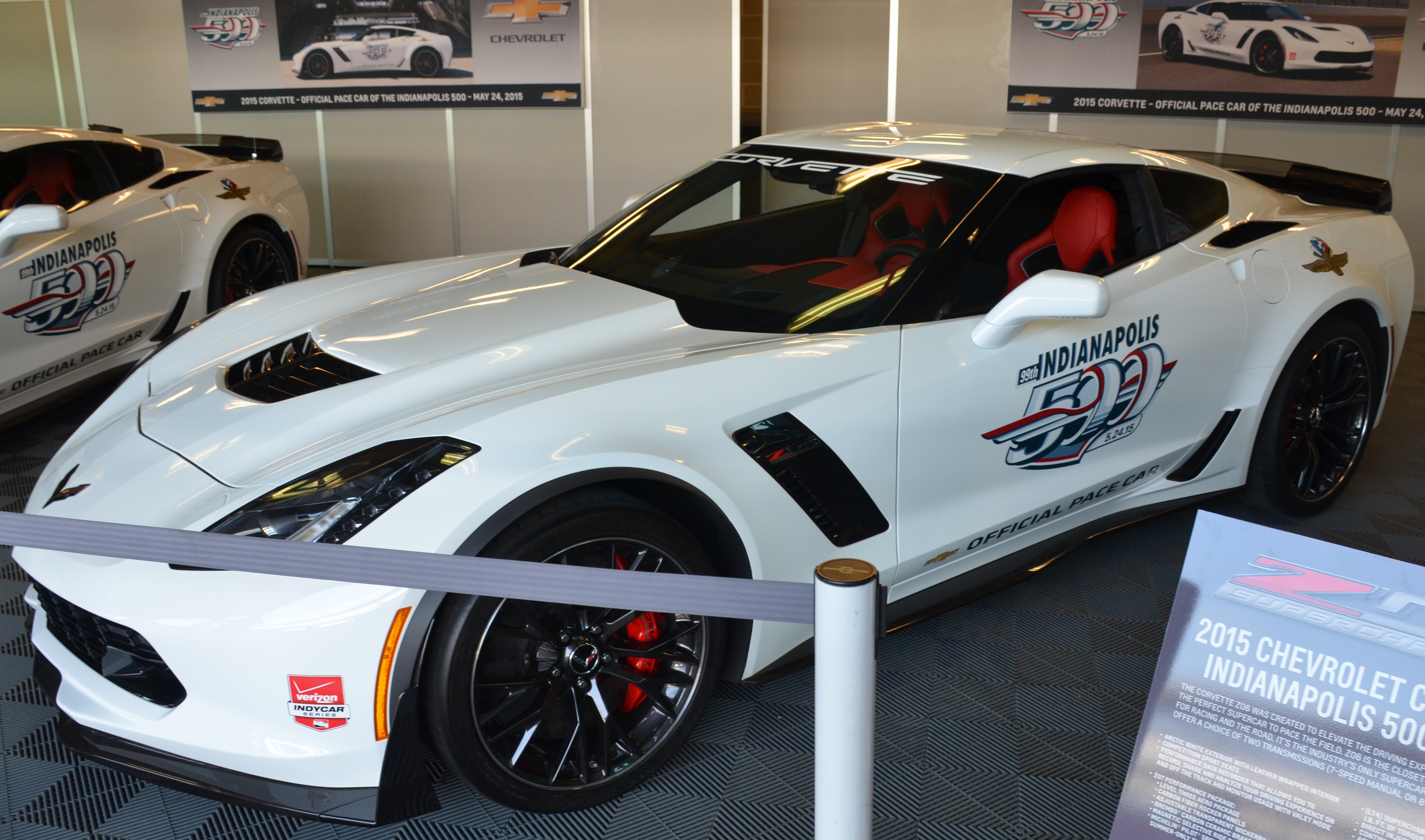
Gordon drove this 2015 Corvette Z06 as the honorary pace car driver for the 99th Indianapolis 500.

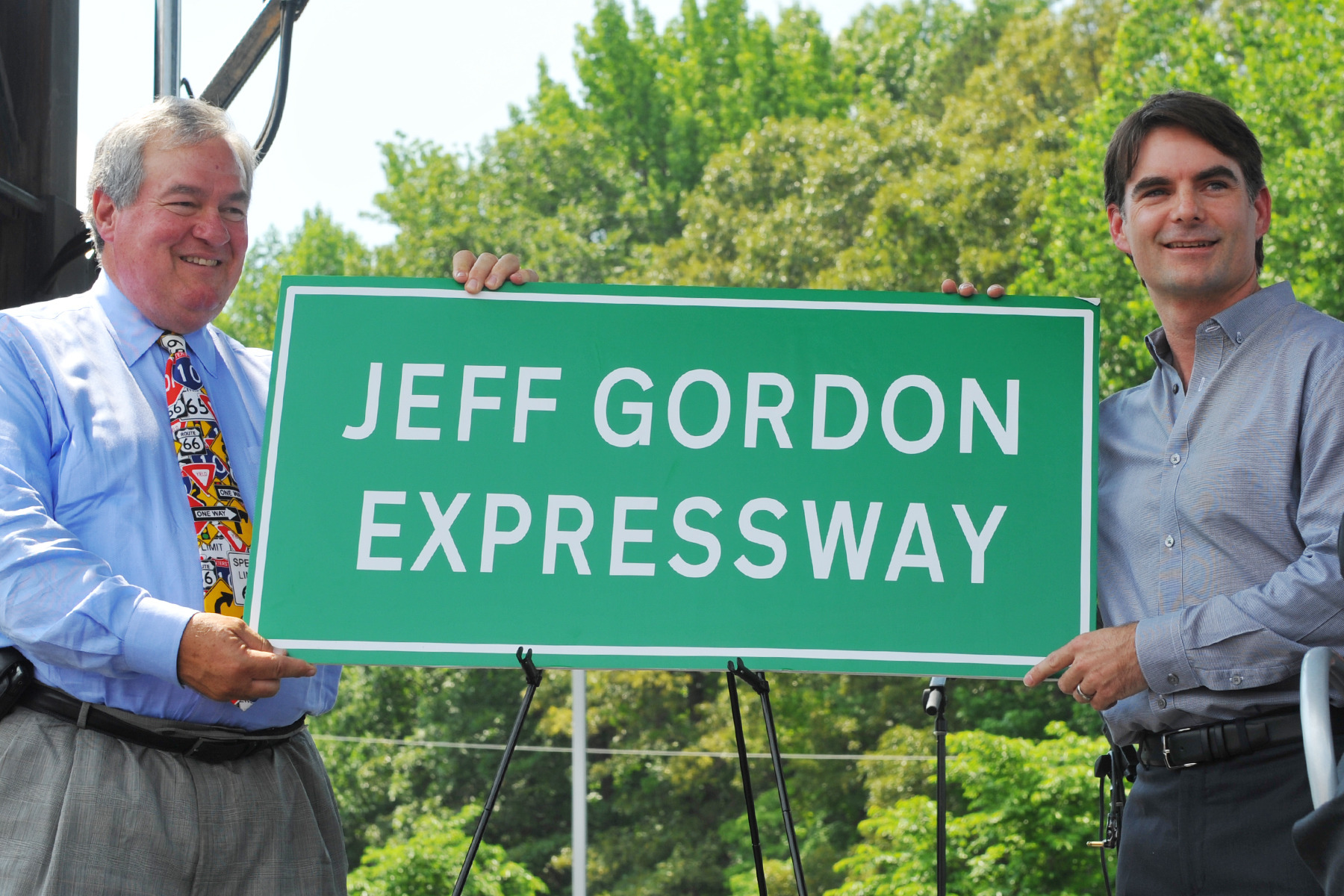
Secretary of the North Carolina Department of Transportation Gene Conti and Gordon unveiling a sign for the Jeff Gordon Expressway

=== Awards and honors ===
- 1990 Hoosier Auto Racing Fans Driver of the Year
- 1990, 1991, 1994, 1995, 1996, 1997, 1998, 2001, 2007 AARWBA All America Team
- 1992 Pat O'Connor Award recipient
- 1994 Hoosier Auto Racing Fans Hall of Fame inductee
- 1995, 1998 Richard Petty Driver of the Year
- 1995, 1998, 2001 Jerry Titus Memorial Trophy winner
- 1996, 1998, 1999, 2007 Best Driver ESPY Award recipient
- 1996, 2016 Order of the Long Leaf Pine recipient
- 1997 People's 50 Most Beautiful People
- 1997, 2004, 2011 NASCAR Illustrated Person of the Year Award recipient
- 1998 NASCAR's 50 Greatest Drivers
- 2000 People's Men in the Fast Lane
- 2002 IIS Sports Ethics Fellow
- 2005 Vallejo Sports Hall of Fame inductee
- 2007 Pep Boys Auto 500 Grand Marshal
- 2009 National Midget Auto Racing Hall of Fame inductee
- 2009 Silver Buffalo Award recipient
- 2011 Legends of The Glen inductee
- 2011 National Motorsports Press Association Spirit Award recipient (overall)
- 2012 Heisman Humanitarian Award recipient
- 2012 Myers Brothers Award recipient
- 2014 Angel Ball honoree
- 2015 Indianapolis 500 honorary pace car driver
- 2015 Ride of Fame immortal honoree
- 2015 Sagamore of the Wabash recipient
- 2015 H. Clay Earles Award recipient
- 2015 Chevrolet Lifetime Achievement Award recipient
- 2015 Bill France Award of Excellence recipient
- 2015 National Motorsports Press Association Spirit Award recipient (fourth quarter)
- 2016 Denise McCluggage Award recipient
- 2016 Order of the Long Leaf Pine recipient
- 2016 Bristol Motor Speedway Legends Plaza inductee
- 2016 NASCAR Euro Series Circuit Zolder Finals Grand Marshal
- 2017 Daytona 500 honorary pace car driver
- 2017 Brickyard 400 honorary pace car driver
- 2018 Motorsports Hall of Fame of America inductee
- 2018 Indianapolis Motor Speedway Hall of Fame inductee
- 2019 NASCAR Hall of Fame inductee
- 2022 Chili Bowl Grand Marshal
- 2022 Busch Light Clash at The Coliseum Grand Marshal
- 2023 Daytona 500 Grand Marshal
- Named one of NASCAR's 75 Greatest Drivers (2023)

==== Namesakes ====
- Jeff Gordon Boulevard – In 1999, Pittsboro, Indiana renamed County Road 275 East, which runs approximately one-mile on both sides of Interstate 74 in Indiana, after Gordon on his 28th birthday.
- Jeff Gordon Expressway – In 2012, a 1.6-mile (2.6 km) section of Interstate 85 in North Carolina from Charlotte to the Mecklenburg-Cabarrus County line was named after Gordon. The interstate number choice was made after Gordon recorded his 85th career victory.
- Jeff Gordon Raceway – In 2015, Phoenix International Raceway was renamed after Gordon exclusively for the running of the Quicken Loans Race for Heroes 500 on November 15.
- Jeff Gordon Terrace – In 2016, Bristol Motor Speedway named a grandstand section on the backstretch after Gordon.
- Jeff Gordon Finish Line Terrace – In 2017, Darlington Raceway named a grandstand section at the start-finish line after Gordon.

=== Records and milestones ===
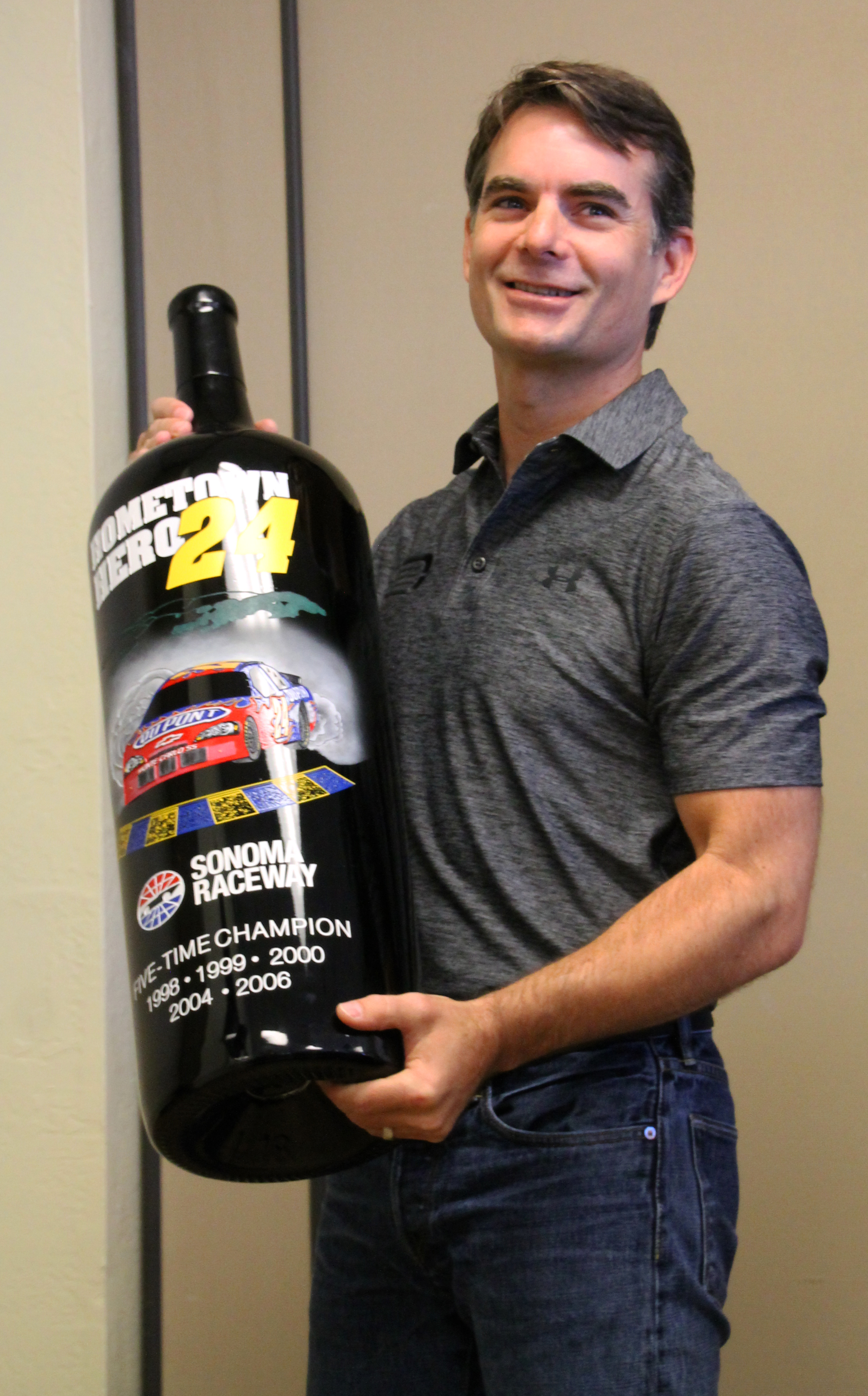
Gordon with a commemorative wine bottle celebrating his wins at Sonoma Raceway

With 93 career points-paying victories, Gordon is ranked third among the all-time NASCAR Cup Series winners; he is ranked first when considering only wins achieved during the sport's modern era (1972–present).

Gordon holds the records for the most points-paying Cup Series victories on restrictor plate tracks (12) and road courses (9). He also earned a record six-consecutive road-course wins from 1997 to 2000.

Gordon is the all-time winningest Cup Series driver at Indianapolis Motor Speedway and Sonoma Raceway, with five victories each. He was formerly tied with Denny Hamlin for the most series wins at Kansas Speedway with three (also tied with Jimmie Johnson, Kevin Harvick, and Joey Logano) and Pocono Raceway with six; Hamlin claimed both records as his own in 2023.

In 1995, at age 24, Gordon became the youngest Cup Series champion in NASCAR's modern era and the second youngest overall, behind Bill Rexford, who won the 1950 series championship at 23 years old.

In 2009, Gordon became the first NASCAR driver to reach US$100 million in career winnings.

In 2014, Gordon joined former F1 driver Michael Schumacher as the only two racers to earn five victories at Indianapolis Motor Speedway in a single racing series.

In 2017, Gordon became the fourth driver to earn victories in the Daytona 500 and the 24 Hours of Daytona; the first three drivers were Mario Andretti, A. J. Foyt, and Jamie McMurray.

==== Consecutive starts streak ====
Since making his Cup Series debut in the Hooters 500 at Atlanta Motor Speedway on November 15, 1992, Gordon never missed a race spanning over 24 consecutive seasons. With 797 starts as of the 2015 Ford EcoBoost 400, Gordon is ninth among all-time Cup Series drivers with the most starts overall.

In 2007, Gordon asked part-time driver Mark Martin if he could be on standby for him to take over the No. 24 car, should he have needed to miss a race to witness the birth of his first child. Daughter Ella Sofia Gordon was born on Wednesday, June 20 in New York City; Gordon traveled to Sonoma, California later that week to compete in the Toyota Save/Mart 350 on June 24. In 2010, Gordon similarly asked road course ringer Scott Pruett to be on standby for him at Watkins Glen due to the impending birth of his second child. Although Gordon let Pruett run a couple of practice laps in Gordon's car, Gordon was able to start and complete the race without Pruett's assistance. Son Leo Benjamin Gordon was born less than a day after the race's conclusion. In 2014, Gordon had Regan Smith on standby for the Coca-Cola 600, as Gordon suffered from back spasms during qualifying and practice. Gordon was able to start and complete the race as scheduled.

On September 27, 2015, at New Hampshire, Gordon started his 789th consecutive race, becoming NASCAR's iron man, passing Ricky Rudd, who started 788 consecutive races from 1981 to 2005. Gordon ended his career with 797 races consecutively started.

== Motorsports career results ==
=== Career summary ===
Season	Series	Team	Races	Wins	Top 5s	Top 10s	Poles	Points	Position
1990	NASCAR Busch Series	Hugh Connerty Racing	1	0	0	0	0	0	115th
1991	NASCAR Busch Series	Bill Davis Racing	30	0	5	10	1	3582	11th
1992	NASCAR Busch Series	Bill Davis Racing	31	3	10	15	11	4053	4th
1992	NASCAR Winston Cup Series	Hendrick Motorsports	1	0	0	0	0	70	79th
1993	NASCAR Winston Cup Series	Hendrick Motorsports	30	0	7	11	1	3447	14th
1994	NASCAR Winston Cup Series	Hendrick Motorsports	31	2	7	14	1	3776	8th
1995	NASCAR Winston Cup Series	Hendrick Motorsports	31	7	17	23	9	4614	1st
1995	International Race of Champions	NASCAR	4	0	3	3	0	51	4th
1996	NASCAR Winston Cup Series	Hendrick Motorsports	31	10	21	24	5	4620	2nd
1996	International Race of Champions	NASCAR	4	0	1	3	0	30	10th
1997	NASCAR Winston Cup Series	Hendrick Motorsports	32	10	22	23	1	4710	1st
1997	International Race of Champions	NASCAR	4	0	2	4	0	39	6th
1998	NASCAR Winston Cup Series	Hendrick Motorsports	33	13	26	28	7	5328	1st
1998	International Race of Champions	NASCAR	4	1	2	4	0	51	3rd
1999	NASCAR Winston Cup Series	Hendrick Motorsports	34	7	18	21	7	4620	6th
1999	NASCAR Busch Series	Gordon/Evernham Motorsports	6	1	4	4	0	878	51st
1999	International Race of Champions	NASCAR	4	0	2	4	0	49	5th
2000	NASCAR Winston Cup Series	Hendrick Motorsports	34	3	11	22	3	4361	9th
2000	NASCAR Busch Series	JG Motorsports	5	1	2	3	0	637	57th
2000	International Race of Champions	NASCAR	4	0	2	4	0	37	6th
2001	NASCAR Winston Cup Series	Hendrick Motorsports	36	6	18	24	6	5112	1st
2002	NASCAR Winston Cup Series	Hendrick Motorsports	36	3	13	20	3	4607	4th
2003	NASCAR Winston Cup Series	Hendrick Motorsports	36	3	15	20	4	4785	4th
2004	NASCAR Nextel Cup Series	Hendrick Motorsports	36	5	16	25	6	6490	3rd
2005	NASCAR Nextel Cup Series	Hendrick Motorsports	36	4	8	14	2	4174	11th
2006	NASCAR Nextel Cup Series	Hendrick Motorsports	36	2	14	18	2	6256	6th
2007	NASCAR Nextel Cup Series	Hendrick Motorsports	36	6	21	30	7	6646	2nd
2007	Rolex Sports Car Series	SunTrust Racing	1	0	1	1	0	30	61st
2008	NASCAR Sprint Cup Series	Hendrick Motorsports	36	0	13	19	4	6316	7th
2009	NASCAR Sprint Cup Series	Hendrick Motorsports	36	1	16	25	1	6473	3rd
2010	NASCAR Sprint Cup Series	Hendrick Motorsports	36	0	11	17	1	6176	9th
2011	NASCAR Sprint Cup Series	Hendrick Motorsports	36	3	13	18	1	2287	8th
2012	NASCAR Sprint Cup Series	Hendrick Motorsports	36	2	11	18	2	2303	10th
2013	NASCAR Sprint Cup Series	Hendrick Motorsports	36	1	8	17	2	2337	6th
2014	NASCAR Sprint Cup Series	Hendrick Motorsports	36	4	14	23	3	2348	6th
2015	NASCAR Sprint Cup Series	Hendrick Motorsports	36	1	5	21	4	5038	3rd
2016	NASCAR Sprint Cup Series	Hendrick Motorsports	8	0	0	2	0	218	38th
2017	WeatherTech SportsCar Championship	Wayne Taylor Racing	1	1	1	1	0	35	28th
NASCAR Cup Series			805	93	325	477	81		
NASCAR Busch Series			73	5	21	32	12		
International Race of Champions			24	1	12	22	0		
International Motor Sports Association			2	1	2	2	0		

=== NASCAR ===
(key) (Bold – Pole position awarded by qualifying time. Italics – Pole position earned by points standings or practice time. * – Most laps led.)

==== Sprint Cup Series ====
NASCAR Sprint Cup Series results
Year	Team	No.	Make	1	2	3	4	5	6	7	8	9	10	11	12	13	14	15	16	17	18	19	20	21	22	23	24	25	26	27	28	29	30	31	32	33	34	35	36	NSCC	Pts	Ref
1992	Hendrick Motorsports	24	Chevy	DAY	CAR	RCH	ATL	DAR	BRI	NWS	MAR	TAL	CLT	DOV	SON	POC	MCH	DAY	POC	TAL	GLN	MCH	BRI	DAR	RCH	DOV	MAR	NWS	CLT	CAR	PHO	ATL; 31								79th	70	
1993	Hendrick Motorsports	24	Chevy	DAY; 5	CAR; 34	RCH; 6	ATL; 4	DAR; 24	BRI; 17	NWS; 34	MAR; 8	TAL; 11	SON; 11	CLT; 2	DOV; 18	POC; 28	MCH; 2	DAY; 5	NHA; 7	POC; 37	TAL; 31	GLN; 31	MCH; 3	BRI; 20	DAR; 22	RCH; 10	DOV; 24	MAR; 11	NWS; 34	**CLT**; 5	CAR; 21	PHO; 35	ATL; 31							14th	3447	
1994	Hendrick Motorsports	24	Chevy	DAY; 4	CAR; 32	RCH; 3	ATL; 8	DAR; 31	BRI; 22	NWS; 15	MAR; 33	TAL; 24	SON; 37	**CLT**; 1	DOV; 5	POC; 6	MCH; 12	DAY; 8	NHA; 39	POC; 8	TAL; 31	IND; 1*	GLN; 9	MCH; 15	BRI; 32	DAR; 6	RCH; 2	DOV; 11	MAR; 11	NWS; 8	CLT; 28	CAR; 29	PHO; 4	ATL; 15						8th	3776	
1995	Hendrick Motorsports	24	Chevy	DAY; 22	**CAR**; 1*	**RCH**; 36	ATL; 1*	**DAR**; 32*	BRI; 1*	**NWS**; 2	MAR; 3	TAL; 2	SON; 3	**CLT**; 33	**DOV**; 6	POC; 16*	**MCH**; 2*	DAY; 1*	NHA; 1*	POC; 2	TAL; 8*	**IND**; 6	GLN; 3	MCH; 3*	BRI; 6	DAR; 1	RCH; 6	DOV; 1*	MAR; 7	NWS; 3	CLT; 30	CAR; 20	PHO; 5	ATL; 32						1st	4614	
1996	Hendrick Motorsports	24	Chevy	DAY; 42	CAR; 40	RCH; 1	ATL; 3	DAR; 1*	BRI; 1*	NWS; 2	MAR; 3*	TAL; 33	SON; 6	**CLT**; 4	**DOV**; 1*	**POC**; 1*	MCH; 6	**DAY**; 3	NHA; 34*	POC; 7	TAL; 1	**IND**; 37	GLN; 4	MCH; 5	BRI; 2	DAR; 1	RCH; 2*	DOV; 1*	MAR; 1	NWS; 1*	CLT; 31	CAR; 12	PHO; 5	ATL; 3						2nd	4620	
1997	Hendrick Motorsports	24	Chevy	DAY; 1	CAR; 1	RCH; 4	ATL; 42	DAR; 3	TEX; 30	BRI; 1	MAR; 1*	SON; 2	TAL; 5	**CLT**; 1	DOV; 26	POC; 1	MCH; 5	CAL; 1*	DAY; 21	NHA; 23	POC; 2	IND; 4	GLN; 1*	MCH; 2	BRI; 35	DAR; 1	RCH; 3	NHA; 1*	DOV; 7	MAR; 4	CLT; 5	TAL; 35	CAR; 4	PHO; 17	ATL; 17					1st	4710	
1998	Hendrick Motorsports	24	Chevy	DAY; 16	CAR; 1	LVS; 17	ATL; 19	DAR; 2	BRI; 1	TEX; 31	MAR; 8	TAL; 5	**CAL**; 4	**CLT**; 1	DOV; 3*	**RCH**; 37	MCH; 3*	**POC**; 2	**SON**; 1*	NHA; 3	POC; 1*	IND; 1*	**GLN**; 1*	MCH; 1	BRI; 5	**NHA**; 1	DAR; 1	RCH; 2	DOV; 2	MAR; 2	CLT; 5	TAL; 2	DAY; 1*	PHO; 7	CAR; 1	ATL; 1*				1st	5328	
1999	Hendrick Motorsports	24	Chevy	**DAY**; 1	CAR; 39	LVS; 3	ATL; 1*	**DAR**; 3	TEX; 43	BRI; 6	MAR; 3	TAL; 38	CAL; 1*	**RCH**; 31	CLT; 39	DOV; 2	**MCH**; 2	POC; 2	**SON**; 1*	DAY; 21	**NHA**; 3	POC; 32	**IND**; 3	GLN; 1*	MCH; 2*	BRI; 4	DAR; 13	RCH; 40	NHA; 5	DOV; 17	MAR; 1	CLT; 1	TAL; 12*	CAR; 11	PHO; 10	HOM; 10	ATL; 38			6th	4620	
2000	Hendrick Motorsports	24	Chevy	DAY; 34	CAR; 10	LVS; 28	ATL; 9	**DAR**; 8	BRI; 8*	TEX; 25	MAR; 4	TAL; 1	CAL; 11	RCH; 14	CLT; 10	DOV; 32	MCH; 14	POC; 8	SON; 1*	DAY; 10	NHA; 5	POC; 3	IND; 33	GLN; 23	MCH; 36	BRI; 23	DAR; 4	RCH; 1	NHA; 6	DOV; 9	MAR; 5	**CLT**; 39	TAL; 4	CAR; 2	PHO; 7	HOM; 7	**ATL**; 4			9th	4361	
2001	Hendrick Motorsports	24	Chevy	DAY; 30	**CAR**; 3*	LVS; 1	ATL; 2*	DAR; 40	BRI; 4	TEX; 5	**MAR**; 12	TAL; 27	CAL; 2	RCH; 2	CLT; 29	DOV; 1*	**MCH**; 1*	POC; 2*	**SON**; 3*	DAY; 37	CHI; 17	**NHA**; 2*	POC; 8*	IND; 1	GLN; 1	MCH; 7	BRI; 3*	DAR; 2*	**RCH**; 36	DOV; 4	KAN; 1	CLT; 16	MAR; 9	TAL; 7	PHO; 6	CAR; 25	HOM; 28	ATL; 6	NHA; 15*	1st	5112	
2002	Hendrick Motorsports	24	Chevy	DAY; 9	CAR; 7	LVS; 17	ATL; 16	DAR; 9*	**BRI**; 31	TEX; 2	**MAR**; 23	TAL; 4	CAL; 16	RCH; 7	CLT; 5	DOV; 6	POC; 5	MCH; 5	SON; 37*	DAY; 22	CHI; 2	NHA; 29	POC; 12	IND; 6	GLN; 22	MCH; 19	**BRI**; 1*	DAR; 1*	RCH; 40	NHA; 14	DOV; 37	KAN; 1*	TAL; 42	CLT; 4	MAR; 36	ATL; 6	CAR; 5	PHO; 3	HOM; 5	4th	4607	
2003	Hendrick Motorsports	24	Chevy	DAY; 12	CAR; 15	LVS; 37	ATL; 2	DAR; 33	BRI; 9*	TEX; 3	TAL; 8	**MAR**; 1	CAL; 11	RCH; 16	CLT; 8	DOV; 2	POC; 13	MCH; 3	SON; 2	DAY; 14	CHI; 4	NHA; 24*	POC; 36	IND; 4	**GLN**; 33	MCH; 30	**BRI**; 28*	DAR; 32	RCH; 10*	NHA; 19	DOV; 5	TAL; 5*	KAN; 5	CLT; 5	**MAR**; 1*	ATL; 1	PHO; 7	CAR; 22	HOM; 5	4th	4785	
2004	Hendrick Motorsports	24	Chevy	DAY; 8	CAR; 10	LVS; 15	ATL; 10	DAR; 41	BRI; 9	TEX; 3	**MAR**; 6*	TAL; 1	CAL; 1*	RCH; 6	CLT; 30	DOV; 36	POC; 4	**MCH**; 38*	**SON**; 1*	**DAY**; 1*	**CHI**; 4	NHA; 2	POC; 5	IND; 1*	GLN; 21	MCH; 7	**BRI**; 14	CAL; 37	RCH; 3	NHA; 7	DOV; 3	TAL; 19	KAN; 13	CLT; 2	MAR; 9	ATL; 34	PHO; 3	DAR; 3*	HOM; 3	3rd	6490	
2005	Hendrick Motorsports	24	Chevy	DAY; 1	CAL; 30	LVS; 4	ATL; 39	BRI; 15	MAR; 1	TEX; 15	**PHO**; 12	TAL; 1*	DAR; 2	RCH; 39	CLT; 30	DOV; 39	POC; 9	MCH; 32	**SON**; 33	DAY; 7	CHI; 33	NHA; 25	POC; 13	IND; 8	GLN; 14	MCH; 15	BRI; 6	CAL; 21	RCH; 30	NHA; 14	DOV; 37	TAL; 37	KAN; 10	CLT; 38	MAR; 1	ATL; 2	TEX; 14	PHO; 3	HOM; 9	11th	4174	
2006	Hendrick Motorsports	24	Chevy	DAY; 26	CAL; 13	LVS; 5	ATL; 4	BRI; 21	MAR; 2	TEX; 22	PHO; 10	TAL; 15*	RCH; 40	DAR; 2	CLT; 36	DOV; 12	POC; 34	MCH; 8*	SON; 1*	DAY; 40	CHI; 1	NHA; 15	POC; 3	IND; 16	GLN; 13	MCH; 2	BRI; 5	CAL; 5	RCH; 31	NHA; 3	**DOV**; 3	KAN; 39	TAL; 36	CLT; 24	MAR; 5	ATL; 6	TEX; 9	**PHO**; 4	HOM; 24	6th	6256	
2007	Hendrick Motorsports	24	Chevy	DAY; 10	**CAL**; 2	LVS; 2*	ATL; 12	**BRI**; 3	MAR; 2	TEX; 4*	**PHO**; 1	**TAL**; 1*	**RCH**; 4*	DAR; 1	CLT; 41	DOV; 9	POC; 1	MCH; 9	SON; 7	NHA; 2	DAY; 5	CHI; 9	IND; 3	POC; 4	GLN; 9*	**MCH**; 27	BRI; 19	CAL; 22	RCH; 4*	NHA; 2	DOV; 11	KAN; 5	TAL; 1	CLT; 1	**MAR**; 3*	ATL; 7	TEX; 7	PHO; 10	HOM; 4	2nd	6646	
2008	Hendrick Motorsports	24	Chevy	DAY; 39	CAL; 3	LVS; 35	**ATL**; 5	BRI; 11	**MAR**; 2	TEX; 43	PHO; 13	TAL; 19	RCH; 9	DAR; 3	CLT; 4	DOV; 5	POC; 14	MCH; 18	SON; 3	NHA; 11	DAY; 30	CHI; 11	IND; 5	POC; 10	GLN; 29	MCH; 42	BRI; 5	CAL; 15	RCH; 8	NHA; 14	**DOV**; 7	KAN; 4	TAL; 38	CLT; 8	MAR; 4	ATL; 9	**TEX**; 2	PHO; 41	HOM; 4	7th	6316	
2009	Hendrick Motorsports	24	Chevy	DAY; 13	CAL; 2	LVS; 6	ATL; 2	BRI; 4	MAR; 4	TEX; 1*	PHO; 25	TAL; 37	RCH; 8	DAR; 5	CLT; 14	DOV; 26	POC; 4	MCH; 2	SON; 9	NHA; 2	DAY; 28	CHI; 2	IND; 9	POC; 8	GLN; 37	MCH; 2	BRI; 23	ATL; 8	RCH; 3	NHA; 15	DOV; 6	KAN; 2	CAL; 2	CLT; 4	MAR; 5	TAL; 20	**TEX**; 13	PHO; 9	HOM; 6	3rd	6473	
2010	Hendrick Motorsports	24	Chevy	DAY; 26	CAL; 20	LVS; 3*	ATL; 18	BRI; 14	MAR; 3	PHO; 2	TEX; 31*	TAL; 22	RCH; 2	DAR; 4*	DOV; 11	CLT; 6	POC; 32	MCH; 4	SON; 5	NHA; 4	DAY; 3	CHI; 3	IND; 23	POC; 6	GLN; 10	MCH; 27	BRI; 11	ATL; 13	RCH; 12	NHA; 6	DOV; 11	KAN; 5	CAL; 9	**CLT**; 23	MAR; 20	TAL; 8	TEX; 37	PHO; 11	HOM; 37	9th	6176	
2011	Hendrick Motorsports	24	Chevy	DAY; 28	PHO; 1*	LVS; 36	BRI; 14	CAL; 18	MAR; 5	TEX; 23	**TAL**; 3	RCH; 39	DAR; 12	DOV; 17	CLT; 20	KAN; 4	POC; 1	MCH; 17	SON; 2	DAY; 6	KEN; 10	NHA; 11	IND; 2	POC; 6	GLN; 13	MCH; 6	BRI; 3*	ATL; 1*	RCH; 3	CHI; 24	NHA; 4*	DOV; 12	KAN; 34	CLT; 21	TAL; 27	MAR; 3	TEX; 6	PHO; 32	HOM; 5	8th	2287	
2012	Hendrick Motorsports	24	Chevy	DAY; 40	PHO; 8	LVS; 12	BRI; 35	CAL; 26	MAR; 14*	TEX; 4	KAN; 21	RCH; 23	**TAL**; 33	DAR; 35	CLT; 7	DOV; 13	POC; 19	MCH; 6	SON; 6	KEN; 5	DAY; 12	NHA; 6	IND; 5	POC; 1	GLN; 21	MCH; 28	BRI; 3	ATL; 2	RCH; 2	CHI; 35	**NHA**; 3	DOV; 2	TAL; 2	CLT; 18	KAN; 10	MAR; 7	TEX; 14	PHO; 30	HOM; 1	10th	2303	
2013	Hendrick Motorsports	24	Chevy	DAY; 20	PHO; 9	LVS; 25	BRI; 34	CAL; 11	MAR; 3	TEX; 38	KAN; 13	RCH; 11	TAL; 11	DAR; 3	CLT; 35	DOV; 3	POC; 12	MCH; 39	SON; 2	KEN; 8	DAY; 34	NHA; 10	IND; 7	POC; 2	GLN; 36	MCH; 17	BRI; 7	ATL; 6	**RCH**; 8	CHI; 6	NHA; 15	DOV; 4	KAN; 3	**CLT**; 7	TAL; 14	MAR; 1	TEX; 38	PHO; 14	HOM; 11	6th	2337	
2014	Hendrick Motorsports	24	Chevy	DAY; 4	PHO; 5	LVS; 9	BRI; 7	CAL; 13	MAR; 12	TEX; 2	DAR; 7	RCH; 2*	TAL; 39	KAN; 1	CLT; 7	DOV; 15	POC; 8	MCH; 6	SON; 2	KEN; 6	DAY; 12	NHA; 26	IND; 1	POC; 6*	**GLN**; 34*	**MCH**; 1	BRI; 16	ATL; 17	RCH; 2	CHI; 2	NHA; 26	DOV; 1	KAN; 14	CLT; 2	TAL; 26	MAR; 2*	TEX; 29	PHO; 2	**HOM**; 10*	6th	2348	
2015	Hendrick Motorsports	24	Chevy	**DAY**; 33*	ATL; 41	**LVS**; 18	PHO; 9	CAL; 10	MAR; 9	TEX; 7	BRI; 3	RCH; 8	**TAL**; 31	KAN; 4	CLT; 15	DOV; 10	POC; 14	MCH; 21	SON; 16	DAY; 6	KEN; 7	NHA; 9	IND; 42	POC; 3	GLN; 41	MCH; 17	BRI; 20	DAR; 16	RCH; 7	CHI; 14	NHA; 7	DOV; 12	CLT; 8	KAN; 10	**TAL**; 3	MAR; 1	TEX; 9	PHO; 6	HOM; 6	3rd	5038	
2016	Hendrick Motorsports	88	Chevy	DAY	ATL	LVS	PHO	CAL	MAR	TEX	BRI	RCH	TAL	KAN	DOV	CLT	POC	MCH	SON	DAY	KEN	NHA	IND; 13	POC; 27	GLN; 14	BRI; 11	MCH	DAR; 14	RCH; 16	CHI	NHA	DOV; 10	CLT	KAN	TAL	MAR; 6	TEX	PHO	HOM	38th	218	

===== Daytona 500 =====
Year	Team	Manufacturer	Start	Finish
1993	Hendrick Motorsports	Chevrolet	3	5
1994	Hendrick Motorsports	Chevrolet	6	4
1995	Hendrick Motorsports	Chevrolet	4	22
1996	Hendrick Motorsports	Chevrolet	8	42
1997	Hendrick Motorsports	Chevrolet	6	**1**
1998	Hendrick Motorsports	Chevrolet	29	16
1999	Hendrick Motorsports	Chevrolet	**1**	**1**
2000	Hendrick Motorsports	Chevrolet	11	34
2001	Hendrick Motorsports	Chevrolet	13	30
2002	Hendrick Motorsports	Chevrolet	3	9
2003	Hendrick Motorsports	Chevrolet	13	12
2004	Hendrick Motorsports	Chevrolet	39	8
2005	Hendrick Motorsports	Chevrolet	15	**1**
2006	Hendrick Motorsports	Chevrolet	2	26
2007	Hendrick Motorsports	Chevrolet	42	10
2008	Hendrick Motorsports	Chevrolet	8	39
2009	Hendrick Motorsports	Chevrolet	3	13
2010	Hendrick Motorsports	Chevrolet	21	26
2011	Hendrick Motorsports	Chevrolet	2	28
2012	Hendrick Motorsports	Chevrolet	16	40
2013	Hendrick Motorsports	Chevrolet	2	20
2014	Hendrick Motorsports	Chevrolet	6	4
2015	Hendrick Motorsports	Chevrolet	**1**	33

==== Busch Series ====
NASCAR Busch Series results
Year	Team	No.	Make	1	2	3	4	5	6	7	8	9	10	11	12	13	14	15	16	17	18	19	20	21	22	23	24	25	26	27	28	29	30	31	32	NBGNC	Pts	Ref
1990	Hugh Connerty Racing	67	Pontiac	DAY	RCH	CAR	MAR	HCY	DAR	BRI	LAN	SBO	NZH	HCY	CLT	DOV	ROU	VOL	MYB	OXF	NHA	SBO	DUB	IRP	ROU	BRI	DAR	RCH	DOV	MAR	CLT; DNQ	NHA	CAR; 39	MAR; DNQ		115th	0	
1991	Bill Davis Racing	1	Ford	DAY; DNQ		CAR; 24	MAR; 14	VOL; 13	HCY; 15	DAR; 9	BRI; 32	LAN; 2	SBO; 23	NZH; 5	CLT; 18	DOV; 2	**ROU**; 9	HCY; 2	MYB; 13	GLN; 6	OXF; 29	NHA; 15	SBO; 20	DUB; 12	IRP; 18	ROU; 11	BRI; 3	DAR; 28	RCH; 13	DOV; 8	CLT; 35	NHA; 19	CAR; 37			11th	3582	
1991	Bill Davis Racing	4	Ford		RCH; 17																															11th	3582	
1991	Bill Davis Racing	1	Olds																															MAR; 8		11th	3582	
1992	Bill Davis Racing	1	Ford	DAY; 23	**CAR**; 9	**RCH**; 8	**ATL**; 1*	MAR; 6	DAR; 26	BRI; 5	HCY; 28	**LAN**; 10*	DUB; 5	NZH; 26	**CLT**; 1	DOV; 18	ROU; 5	**MYB**; 5*	GLN; 19	**VOL**; 18*		TAL; 11	IRP; 14	ROU; 9	**MCH**; 19	NHA; 4	BRI; 19*	DAR; 3	RCH; 17	**DOV**; 12	**CLT**; 1*	MAR; 14	**CAR**; 2	HCY; 11		4th	4053	
1992	Bill Davis Racing	4	Ford																		NHA; 29															4th	4053	
1999	Gordon/Evernham Motorsports	24	Chevy	DAY	CAR	LVS; 4	ATL	DAR	TEX; 13	NSV	BRI	TAL	CAL	NHA	RCH	NZH	CLT; 33	DOV	SBO	GLN	MLW	MYB	PPR	GTY	IRP	MCH; 2	BRI	DAR	RCH	DOV	CLT; 2	CAR	MEM	PHO; 1	HOM	51st	878	
2000	JG Motorsports	24	Chevy	DAY	CAR	LVS; 18	ATL	DAR	BRI	TEX; 42	NSV	TAL	CAL	RCH	NHA	CLT; 4	DOV	SBO	MYB	GLN	MLW	NZH	PPR	GTY	IRP	MCH; 7	BRI	DAR	RCH	DOV	CLT	CAR	MEM	PHO	HOM; 1	57th	637	

=== Sports car racing ===
==== Rolex Sports Car Series ====
(key) Bold – pole position (overall finish/class finish).

Grand-Am Rolex Sports Car Series DP results
Year	Team	No.	Engine	Chassis	1	2	3	4	5	6	7	8	9	10	11	12	13	14	Pos	Pts	Ref
2007	SunTrust Racing	10	Pontiac 5.0L V8	Riley Technologies MkXI	DAY (3/3)	MEX	HOM	VIR	LGA	WGL	MOH	DAY	IOW	BAR	MON	WGL	INF	MIL	61st	30	

==== WeatherTech SportsCar Championship ====
WeatherTech SportsCar Championship results
Year	Team	Class	Chassis	Engine	1	2	3	4	5	6	7	8	9	10	Pos	Pts	Ref
2017	Wayne Taylor Racing	P	Cadillac DPi-V.R	Cadillac 6.2 L V8	DAY; 1	SEB	LBH	COA	DET	WAT	MSP	ELK	LGA	PET	28th	35	

==== 24 Hours of Daytona ====
24 Hours of Daytona results
Year	Class	No	Team	Car	Co-drivers	Laps	Position	Class Pos.
2007	DP	10	(United States) SunTrust Racing	Pontiac Riley DP	(South Africa) Wayne Taylor (Italy) Max Angelelli (Denmark) Jan Magnussen	666	3	3
2017	P	10	(United States) Wayne Taylor Racing	Cadillac DPi-V.R	(United States) Jordan Taylor (United States) Ricky Taylor (Italy) Max Angelelli	659	**1**	**1**

=== International Race of Champions ===
(key) (Bold – Pole position. * – Most laps led.)

International Race of Champions results
Year	Make	1	2	3	4	Pos.	Pts	Ref
1995	Dodge	DAY; 11	DAR; 2	TAL; 5	MCH; 3	4th	51	
1996	Pontiac	DAY; 6	TAL; 7	CLT; 5	MCH; 12	10th	30	
1997	Pontiac	DAY; 9	CLT; 3	CAL; 5	MCH; 9	6th	39	
1998	Pontiac	DAY; 1	CAL; 3	MCH; 8	IND; 9	3rd	51	
1999	Pontiac	DAY; 6	TAL; 4	MCH; 7	IND; 2	5th	49	
2000	Pontiac	DAY; 10	TAL; 5	MCH; 7	IND; 4	6th	37	

== See also ==
- List of all-time NASCAR Cup Series winners
- List of NASCAR race wins by Jeff Gordon
- List of NASCAR Sprint Cup Series champions
- List of Daytona 500 winners
- List of Daytona 500 pole position winners
- List of celebrities who own wineries and vineyards
- List of members of the NASCAR Hall of Fame

Sporting positions
Preceded by Dale Earnhardt; Terry Labonte; Bobby Labonte	NASCAR Winston Cup Series champion 1995; 1997, 1998; 2001	Succeeded by Terry Labonte; Dale Jarrett; Tony Stewart
Preceded by Fernando Alonso; Jesús Puras; Rubén Xaus	Race of Champions; Nations' Cup; 2002 with: Colin Edwards; Jimmie Johnson	Succeeded by Cristiano da Matta; Fonsi Nieto; Gilles Panizzi
Achievements
Preceded by Dale Earnhardt; Dale Jarrett	Busch Clash winner 1994; 1997	Succeeded by Dale Earnhardt; Rusty Wallace
Preceded by Inaugural; Ricky Rudd; Bobby Labonte; Kevin Harvick; Ryan Newman	Brickyard 400 winner 1994; 1998; 2001; 2004; 2014	Succeeded by Dale Earnhardt; Dale Jarrett; Bill Elliott; Tony Stewart; Kyle Busch
Preceded by Geoff Bodine; Michael Waltrip; Dale Earnhardt Jr.	The Winston winner 1995; 1997; 2001	Succeeded by Michael Waltrip; Mark Martin; Ryan Newman
Preceded by Dale Jarrett; Dale Earnhardt; Dale Earnhardt Jr.	Daytona 500 winner 1997; 1999; 2005	Succeeded by Dale Earnhardt; Dale Jarrett; Jimmie Johnson
Preceded by Bill Elliott; Ward Burton; Greg Biffle	Southern 500 winner 1995, 1996, 1997, 1998; 2002; 2007	Succeeded by Jeff Burton; Terry Labonte; Kyle Busch
Awards
Preceded by Jimmy Hensley	NASCAR Winston Cup Series Rookie of the Year; 1993	Succeeded by Jeff Burton
Preceded by Joe Nemechek	NASCAR Busch Grand National Series Rookie of the Year; 1991	Succeeded by Ricky Craven
Preceded by Al Unser Jr. Jimmy Vasser; Tony Stewart	Best Driver ESPY Award; 1996; 1998, 1999; 2007	Succeeded by Jimmy Vasser; Dale Jarrett; Jimmie Johnson
Preceded by Inaugural; Tony Stewart; Kevin Harvick; Tony Stewart	EA Sports NASCAR cover athlete 1998; 2002; 2006; 2009	Succeeded by Dale Earnhardt; Dale Earnhardt Jr. Elliott Sadler; Final
