= 1998 Pepsi Southern 500 =

Race details
- Race 24 of 33 in the 1998 NASCAR Winston Cup Series
- 1998 Southern 500 program cover
- Date: September 6, 1998
- Official name: Pepsi Southern 500
- Location: Darlington Raceway, Darlington County, South Carolina
- Course: Permanent racing facility
- Course length: 1.366 miles (2.198 km)
- Distance: 367 laps, 501.322 mi (806.800 km)
- Weather: Temperatures reaching up to 93.2 °F (34.0 °C); wind speeds up to 11.3 miles per hour (18.2 km/h)
- Average speed: 139.031 miles per hour (223.749 km/h)

Pole position
| Driver | Dale Jarrett | Robert Yates Racing |
- Time: 29.119

Most laps led
| Driver | Jeff Burton | Roush Racing |
- Laps: 273

Winner
| No. 24 | Jeff Gordon | Hendrick Motorsports |

Television in the United States
- Network: ESPN
- Announcers: Bob Jenkins, Ned Jarrett and Benny Parsons

The 1998 Pepsi Southern 500, the 49th running of the event, was a NASCAR Winston Cup Series race held on September 6, 1998 at Darlington Raceway in Darlington, South Carolina. Contested over 367 laps on the 1.366-mile (2.198-kilometre) speedway, it was the twenty-fourth race of the 1998 NASCAR Winston Cup Series season. Jeff Gordon of Hendrick Motorsports won the race and captured his fourth consecutive Southern 500.

== Results ==
| Pos | No. | Driver | Team | Manufacturer | Laps | Laps led | Time/Status | Points |
|---|---|---|---|---|---|---|---|---|
| 1 | 24 | Jeff Gordon | Hendrick Motorsports | Chevrolet | 367 | 64 | 3:36:21 | 180 |
| 2 | 99 | Jeff Burton | Roush Racing | Ford | 367 | 273 | +3.631 | 180 |
| 3 | 88 | Dale Jarrett | Robert Yates Racing | Ford | 367 | 15 | Lead lap | 170 |
| 4 | 3 | Dale Earnhardt | Richard Childress Racing | Chevrolet | 367 | 0 | Lead lap | 160 |
| 5 | 12 | Jeremy Mayfield | Penske-Kranefuss Racing | Ford | 366 | 0 | +1 lap | 155 |
| 6 | 36 | Ernie Irvan | MB2 Motorsports | Pontiac | 365 | 0 | +2 laps | 150 |
| 7 | 2 | Rusty Wallace | Penske Racing South | Ford | 365 | 11 | +2 laps | 151 |
| 8 | 40 | Sterling Marlin | Team SABCO | Chevrolet | 365 | 0 | +2 laps | 142 |
| 9 | 7 | Geoffrey Bodine | Mattei Motorsports | Ford | 364 | 0 | +3 laps | 138 |
| 10 | 81 | Kenny Wallace | FILMAR Racing | Ford | 364 | 0 | +3 laps | 134 |
| 11 | 94 | Bill Elliott | Bill Elliott Racing | Ford | 364 | 1 | +3 laps | 135 |
| 12 | 22 | Ward Burton | Bill Davis Racing | Pontiac | 364 | 0 | +3 laps | 127 |
| 13 | 33 | Ken Schrader | Andy Petree Racing | Chevrolet | 363 | 0 | +4 laps | 124 |
| 14 | 43 | John Andretti | Petty Enterprises | Pontiac | 362 | 0 | +5 laps | 121 |
| 15 | 18 | Bobby Labonte | Joe Gibbs Racing | Pontiac | 362 | 0 | +5 laps | 118 |
| 16 | 46 | Jeff Green | Team SABCO | Chevrolet | 362 | 0 | +5 laps | 115 |
| 17 | 21 | Michael Waltrip | Wood Brothers Racing | Ford | 362 | 0 | +5 laps | 112 |
| 18 | 97 | Chad Little | Roush Racing | Ford | 362 | 0 | +5 laps | 109 |
| 19 | 98 | Rich Bickle | Cale Yarborough Motorsports | Ford | 362 | 0 | +5 laps | 106 |
| 20 | 41 | Steve Grissom | Larry Hedrick Motorsports | Chevrolet | 362 | 0 | +5 laps | 103 |
| 21 | 26 | Johnny Benson Jr. | Roush Racing | Ford | 362 | 0 | +5 laps | 100 |
| 22 | 10 | Ricky Rudd | Rudd Performance Motorsports | Ford | 362 | 0 | +5 laps | 97 |
| 23 | 4 | Bobby Hamilton | Morgan–McClure Motorsports | Chevrolet | 362 | 0 | +5 laps | 94 |
| 24 | 1 | Steve Park | Dale Earnhardt, Inc. | Chevrolet | 361 | 0 | +6 laps | 91 |
| 25 | 5 | Terry Labonte | Hendrick Motorsports | Chevrolet | 361 | 0 | +6 laps | 88 |
| 26 | 31 | Mike Skinner | Richard Childress Racing | Chevrolet | 361 | 0 | +6 laps | 85 |
| 27 | 30 | Derrike Cope | Bahari Racing | Pontiac | 361 | 0 | +6 laps | 82 |
| 28 | 44 | Kyle Petty | PE2 Motorsports | Pontiac | 361 | 0 | +6 laps | 79 |
| 29 | 13 | Dennis Setzer | Elliott-Marino Racing | Ford | 360 | 0 | +7 laps | 76 |
| 30 | 77 | Robert Pressley | Jasper Motorsports | Ford | 360 | 0 | +7 laps | 73 |
| 31 | 50 | Wally Dallenbach Jr. | Hendrick Motorsports | Chevrolet | 360 | 0 | +7 laps | 70 |
| 32 | 9 | Jerry Nadeau | Melling Racing | Ford | 360 | 0 | +7 laps | 67 |
| 33 | 90 | Dick Trickle | Donlavey Racing | Ford | 359 | 0 | +8 laps | 64 |
| 34 | 23 | Jimmy Spencer | Travis Carter Enterprises | Ford | 359 | 0 | +8 laps | 61 |
| 35 | 42 | Joe Nemechek | Team SABCO | Chevrolet | 359 | 0 | +8 laps | 58 |
| 36 | 75 | Rick Mast | Butch Mock Motorsports | Ford | 358 | 0 | +9 laps | 55 |
| 37 | 78 | Gary Bradberry | Triad Motorsports | Ford | 358 | 0 | +9 laps | 52 |
| 38 | 35 | Darrell Waltrip | Tyler Jet Motorsports | Pontiac | 346 | 0 | Oil pump | 49 |
| 39 | 16 | Kevin Lepage | Roush Racing | Ford | 326 | 0 | Ignition | 46 |
| 40 | 6 | Mark Martin | Roush Racing | Ford | 318 | 3 | Engine | 48 |
| 41 | 28 | Kenny Irwin Jr. | Robert Yates Racing | Ford | 298 | 0 | Oil pump | 40 |
| 42 | 11 | Brett Bodine | Brett Bodine Racing | Ford | 269 | 0 | Engine | 37 |
| 43 | 15 | Ted Musgrave | Moore-Robinson Motorsports | Ford | 83 | 0 | Engine | 34 |

== Race statistics ==
- Time of race: 3:36:21
- Average speed: 139.031 miles per hour (223.749 km/h)
- Pole speed: 168.879 miles per hour (271.784 km/h)
- Cautions: 2 for 16 laps
- Margin of Victory: 3.631 seconds
- Lead changes: 12
- Percent of race run under caution: 4.4%
- Average green flag run: 117 laps

Lap leaders
| Laps | Leader |
|---|---|
| 1–8 | Dale Jarrett |
| 9–19 | Rusty Wallace |
| 20–63 | Jeff Burton |
| 64–65 | Mark Martin |
| 66–83 | Jeff Burton |
| 84–90 | Dale Jarrett |
| 91–147 | Jeff Burton |
| 148 | Mark Martin |
| 149 | Bill Elliott |
| 150–273 | Jeff Burton |
| 274–310 | Jeff Gordon |
| 311–340 | Jeff Burton |
| 341–367 | Jeff Gordon |

Total laps led
| Laps led | Driver |
|---|---|
| 273 | Jeff Burton |
| 64 | Jeff Gordon |
| 15 | Dale Jarrett |
| 11 | Rusty Wallace |
| 3 | Mark Martin |
| 1 | Bill Elliott |

Cautions: 2 for 16 laps
| Laps | Reason |
|---|---|
| 83–87 | #23 (Spencer) spin turn 4 |
| 244–254 | Debris turn 2 |
