= IROC XXII =

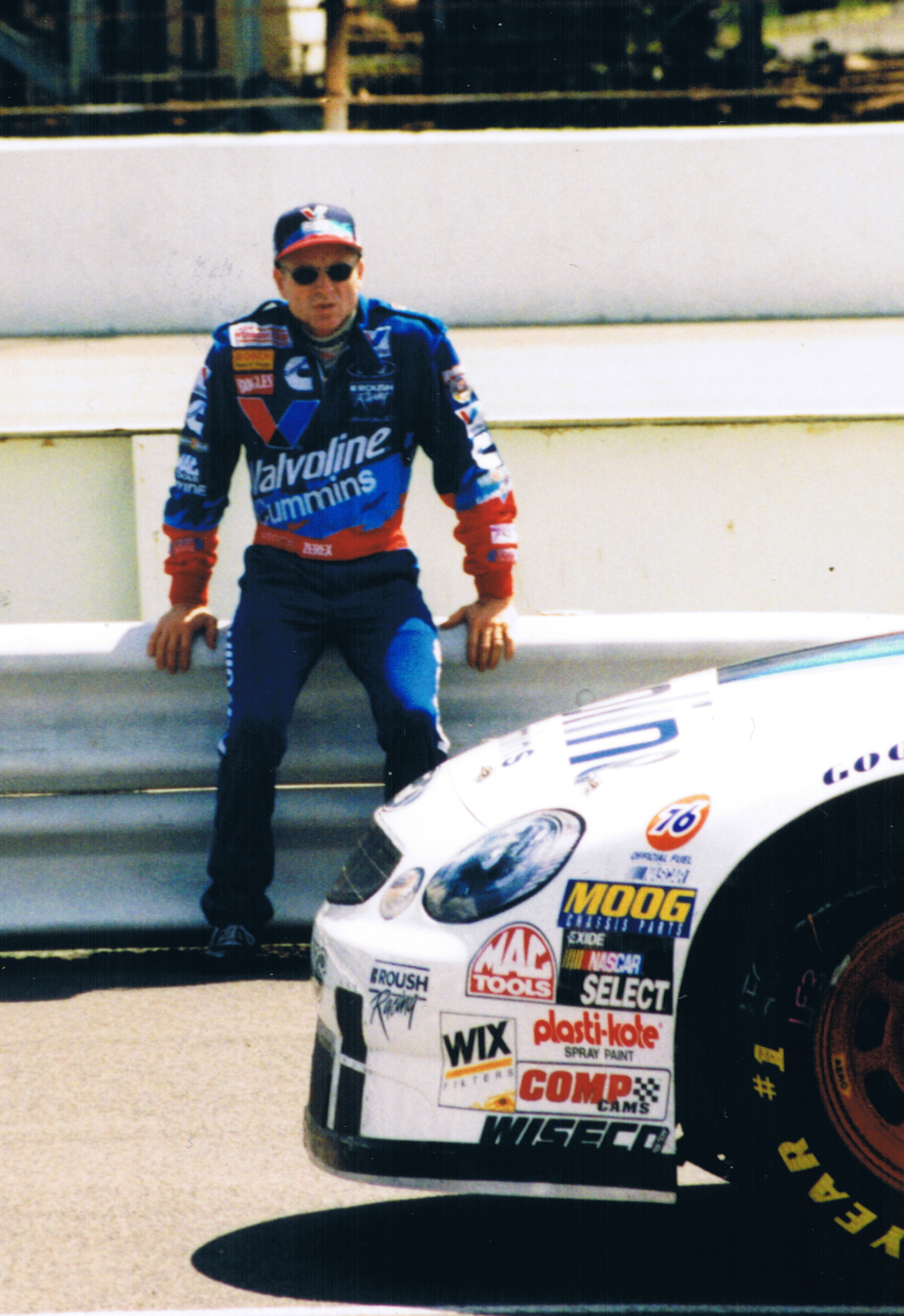
Mark Martin, the IROC XXII champion

IROC XXII was the twenty-second season of the International Race of Champions, which started on February 13, 1998. The series used identically prepared Pontiac Firebird Trans Am race cars, and contested races at Daytona International Speedway^{1}, California Speedway, Michigan International Speedway, and Indianapolis Motor Speedway. Mark Martin won $225,000 and the IROC championship, his third straight win and fourth in five seasons.

The roster of drivers and final points standings were as follows:

Position	Driver	Points	Winnings	Series
1	(United States) Mark Martin	86	$225,000	NASCAR Winston Cup
2	(United States) Jeff Burton	57	$100,000	NASCAR Winston Cup
3	(United States) Jeff Gordon	51	$60,000	NASCAR Winston Cup
4	(United States) Al Unser Jr.	46	$50,000	CART World Series
5	(United States) Terry Labonte	39	$45,000	NASCAR Winston Cup
6	(United States) Tony Stewart	37	$40,000	Indy Racing League
7	(United States) Dale Earnhardt	36	$40,000	NASCAR Winston Cup
8	(United States) Jimmy Vasser	34	$40,000	CART World Series
9	(United States) Randy LaJoie	31	$40,000	NASCAR Busch Series
10	(United States) Dale Jarrett	29	$40,000	NASCAR Winston Cup
11	(United States) Tommy Kendall	28	$40,000	SCCA Trans-Am Series
12	(Netherlands) Arie Luyendyk	26	$40,000	Indy Racing League

== Race results ==
=== Daytona International Speedway, Race One ===
1. Jeff Gordon
2. Jeff Burton
3. Mark Martin
4. Dale Earnhardt
5. Arie Luyendyk
6. Dale Jarrett
7. Terry Labonte
8. Al Unser Jr.
9. Tony Stewart
10. Jimmy Vasser
11. Randy LaJoie
12. Tommy Kendall

=== California Speedway, Race Two ===
1. Mark Martin
2. Al Unser Jr.
3. Jeff Gordon
4. Terry Labonte
5. Jeff Burton
6. Randy LaJoie
7. Tony Stewart
8. Dale Jarrett
9. Jimmy Vasser
10. Dale Earnhardt
11. Arie Luyendyk
12. Tommy Kendall

=== Michigan International Speedway, Race Three ===
1. Jeff Burton
2. Mark Martin
3. Tony Stewart
4. Dale Earnhardt
5. Tommy Kendall
6. Terry Labonte
7. Arie Luyendyk
8. Jeff Gordon
9. Randy LaJoie
10. Dale Jarrett
11. Jimmy Vasser
12. Al Unser Jr.

=== Indianapolis Motor Speedway, Race Four ===
1. Mark Martin
2. Al Unser Jr.
3. Jimmy Vasser
4. Randy LaJoie
5. Terry Labonte
6. Tony Stewart
7. Dale Jarrett
8. Dale Earnhardt
9. Jeff Gordon
10. Tommy Kendall
11. Arie Luyendyk
12. Jeff Burton
- This was the first appearance for IROC at Indianapolis. It was a support event for the Brickyard 400.
- Mark Martin started last and won the race (the 5th time in IROC history that the winner started last).
- This was Al Unser Jr.'s first appearance at the Indianapolis Motor Speedway since failing to qualify at the 1995 Indy 500.

== Notes ==
1. Race at Daytona shortened to 30 laps due to rain.
