= IROC XXIV =

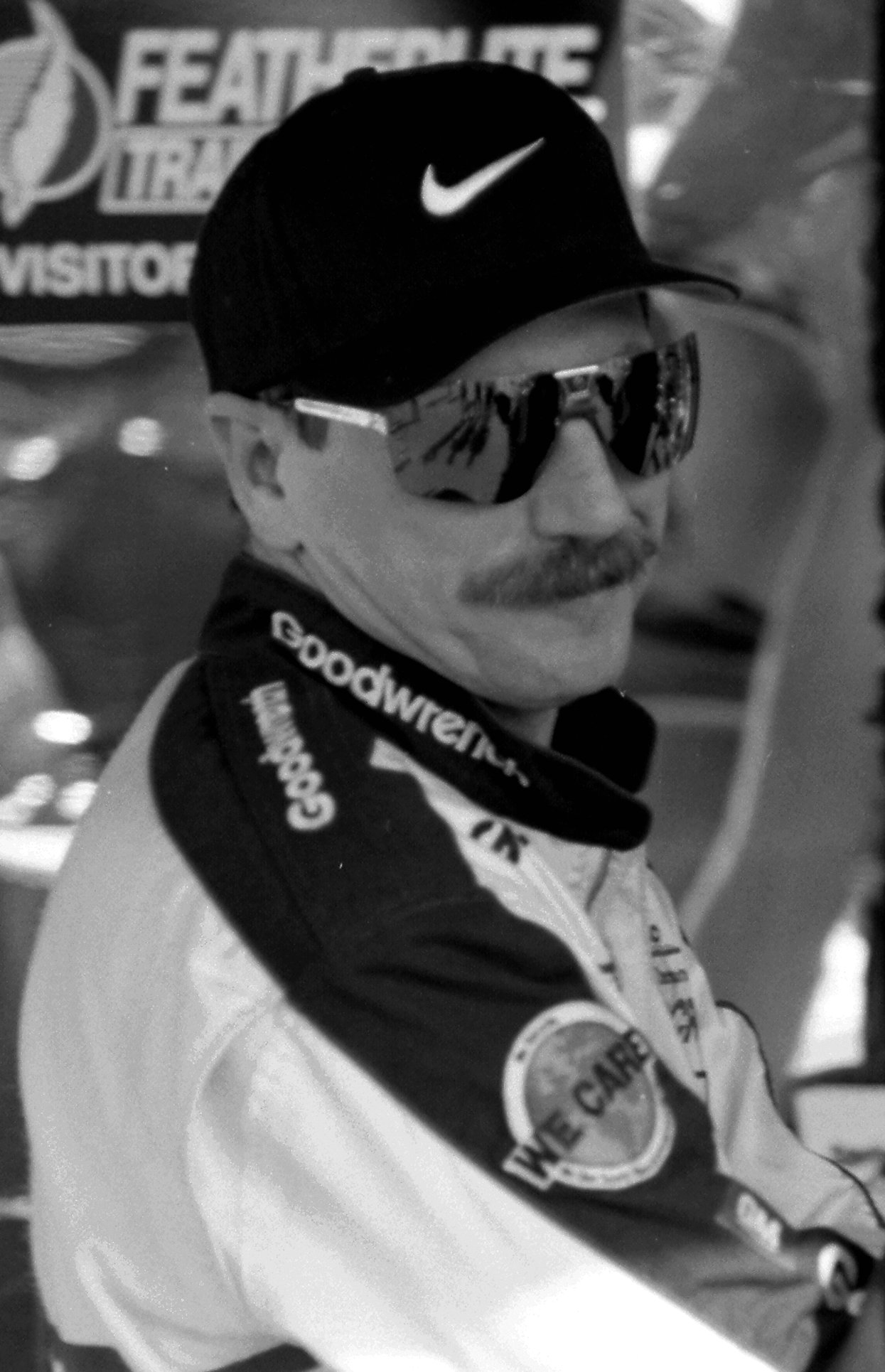
Dale Earnhardt (seen in 1997), the IROC XXIV champion

IROC XXIV was the twenty-fourth season of the International Race of Champions, which started on February 18, 2000. The series used identically prepared Pontiac Firebird Trans Am race cars, and contested races at Daytona International Speedway, Talladega Superspeedway, Michigan International Speedway, and Indianapolis Motor Speedway. Dale Earnhardt won $225,000 and his second consecutive championship, and his fourth and final overall.

The roster of drivers and final points standings were as follows:

Position	Driver	Points	Winnings	Series
1	(United States) Dale Earnhardt	74	$225,000	NASCAR Winston Cup
2	(United States) Mark Martin	71	$100,000	NASCAR Winston Cup
3	(United States) Tony Stewart	57	$60,000	NASCAR Winston Cup
4	(United States) Bobby Labonte	52	$50,000	NASCAR Winston Cup
5	(United States) Eddie Cheever	46	$45,000	Indy Racing League
6	(United States) Jeff Gordon	37	$40,000	NASCAR Winston Cup
7	(United States) Jeff Burton	35	$40,000	NASCAR Winston Cup
8	(United States) Rusty Wallace	31	$40,000	NASCAR Winston Cup
9	(United States) Dale Jarrett	31	$40,000	NASCAR Winston Cup
10	(United States) Dale Earnhardt Jr.	29	$40,000	NASCAR Winston Cup
11	(United States) Greg Ray	23	$40,000	Indy Racing League
12	(United States) Mark Dismore	15	$40,000	Indy Racing League

== Race results ==
=== Daytona International Speedway, Race One ===
1. Dale Earnhardt
2. Tony Stewart
3. Jeff Burton
4. Mark Martin
5. Dale Earnhardt Jr.
6. Rusty Wallace
7. Bobby Labonte
8. Dale Jarrett
9. Greg Ray
10. Jeff Gordon
11. Eddie Cheever
12. Mark Dismore
- This would be Dale Earnhardt's 34th and final victory at Daytona, the most of any auto racing driver in the track's history.

=== Talladega Superspeedway, Race Two ===
1. Bobby Labonte
2. Mark Martin
3. Dale Earnhardt
4. Jeff Burton
5. Jeff Gordon
6. Tony Stewart
7. Greg Ray
8. Dale Jarrett
9. Rusty Wallace
10. Eddie Cheever
11. Dale Earnhardt Jr.
12. Mark Dismore

=== Michigan International Speedway, Race Three ===
1. Eddie Cheever
2. Tony Stewart
3. Dale Earnhardt
4. Mark Martin
5. Dale Jarrett
6. Bobby Labonte
7. Jeff Gordon
8. Dale Earnhardt Jr.
9. Rusty Wallace
10. Mark Dismore
11. Greg Ray
12. Jeff Burton

=== Indianapolis Motor Speedway, Race Four ===
1. Mark Martin
2. Dale Earnhardt
3. Tony Stewart
4. Jeff Gordon
5. Rusty Wallace
6. Bobby Labonte
7. Eddie Cheever
8. Dale Jarrett
9. Dale Earnhardt Jr.
10. Greg Ray
11. Mark Dismore
12. Jeff Burton
