= Al Unser Jr. =

American racing driver (born 1962)

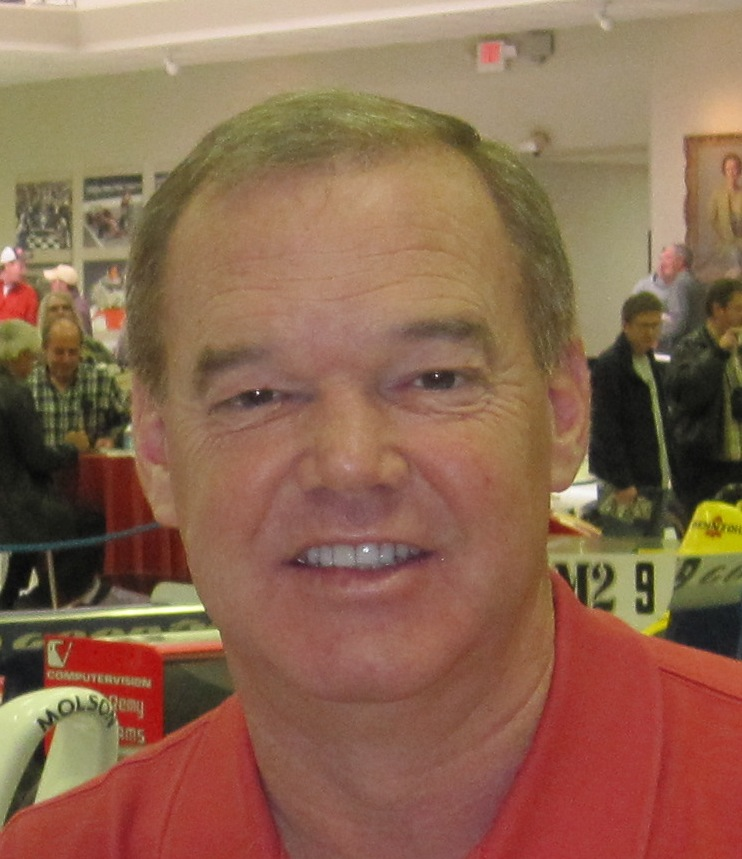
- Unser Jr. in 2011
- Born: Alfred Unser Jr. April 19, 1962 (age 64) Albuquerque, New Mexico, U.S.

Championship titles
- SCCA/CASC Can-Am (1982); CART Championship Car (1990, 1994); Major victories Pikes Peak Hill Climb (1983); 24 Hours of Daytona (1986, 1987); Long Beach Grand Prix (1988, 1989, 1990, 1991, 1994, 1995); Michigan 500 (1990); Indianapolis 500 (1992, 1994)

Awards
- 2000 Indy Racing League Most Popular Driver

Champ Car career
- 273 races run over 19 years
- Best finish: 1st (1990, 1994)
- First race: 1982 AirCal 500 (Riverside)
- Last race: 1999 Marlboro 500 (Fontana)
- First win: 1984 G.I. Joe's 200 (Portland)
- Last win: 1995 Molson Indy Vancouver (Vancouver)
Wins	Podiums	Poles
31	80	7

IndyCar Series career
- 56 races run over 7 years
- Best finish: 6th (2003)
- First race: 2000 Delphi Indy 200 (Orlando)
- Last race: 2007 Indianapolis 500 (Indianapolis)
- First win: 2000 Vegas Indy 300 (Las Vegas)
- Last win: 2003 Bombardier 500 (Texas)
Wins	Podiums	Poles
3	8	0

NASCAR Cup Series career
- 1 race run over 1 year
- Best finish: 81st (1993)
- First race: 1993 Daytona 500 (Daytona)
Wins	Top tens	Poles
0	0	0

Alfred Unser Jr. (born April 19, 1962) – nicknamed "Little Al" to distinguish him from his father, Al Unser – is an American former racing driver. Known primarily for his Championship Car career, Unser won two CART championships, and is a two-time winner of the Indianapolis 500.

Early in his career, Unser found success in the Can-Am series, winning the championship in 1982. He joined his great uncle, uncle, and father, as a winner of the Pikes Peak Hill Climb, doing so in 1983. He is a two-time winner of the 24 Hours of Daytona. He has the most Long Beach Grand Prix victories in history, winning six times.

== History ==
Unser was born into a racing family in Albuquerque, New Mexico. He is the son of Al Unser and the nephew of Bobby Unser, both Indianapolis 500 winners. The Unser family has won the Indy 500 a record nine times.

=== Early career ===
By the age of eleven, Unser was racing sprint cars. After high school, he was already in the World of Outlaws series of sprint car racing. He soon moved into road racing, winning the Super Vee title in 1981, and the Can-Am title in 1982.

=== Rising CART star ===
In 1982, Unser made his debut on the CART circuit. He suffered personal tragedy when his sister Debbie was killed in a dune buggy accident, but this did not deter Unser; and a year later, he competed in his first Indianapolis 500, finishing ninth.

Hours after the race ended, Unser Jr. was issued a two-lap penalty by chief steward Thomas W. Binford for passing two cars under caution with less than forty laps to go as well as blocking the eventual winner, Tom Sneva, from passing his father with less than twenty laps to go. The penalty dropped him from an original finish of ninth to tenth. Despite being lauded for his performance as a rookie, Unser Jr. lost the Rookie of the Year award to Teo Fabi.

Unser continued racing on the CART circuit, becoming one of the series' rising stars. He finished second in the CART championship point standings in 1985, losing to his father by just one point. He began competing in the IROC championship in 1986, winning that championship with two victories in four races. At the age of 24, Unser was the youngest IROC champion ever. Unser won the 1986 and 1988 IROC championships, becoming the final Indycar driver to win an IROC championship. Unser won the 24 Hours of Daytona, also at age 24, in both 1986 and 1987.

Unser continued to improve on the CART circuit, finishing fourth in the points standings in 1986, third in 1987, second in 1988, and finally winning the series for the first time in 1990.

In 1989, Unser was on the verge of winning his first Indianapolis 500; unfortunately, while battling with Emerson Fittipaldi for the lead, the two touched wheels and Unser spun, hitting the wall and ending his chances of winning the race.

This Indianapolis 500 race is remembered for a show of sportsmanship, as Little Al climbed out of his wrecked racecar and gave Fittipaldi the "thumbs up" as he drove by Unser under the yellow flag. Unser would eventually have his day at Indy in 1992, as he went on to defeat Scott Goodyear by 0.043 seconds, a record that stood for 34 years the second closest finish in Indianapolis 500 history.

During the off-season, he drove in the 1993 Daytona 500 for Hendrick Motorsports finishing 36th in his only NASCAR start. He ran well in the race, running with the leaders all day, until a late crash with Kyle Petty and Bobby Hillin Jr. During an interview with Mike Joy after the accident, Joy asked him if he would be back. Unser said that he wanted to come back, but it would never happen. Unser also tested a Williams F1 car, but never competed in the Formula One series.

=== Penske years ===
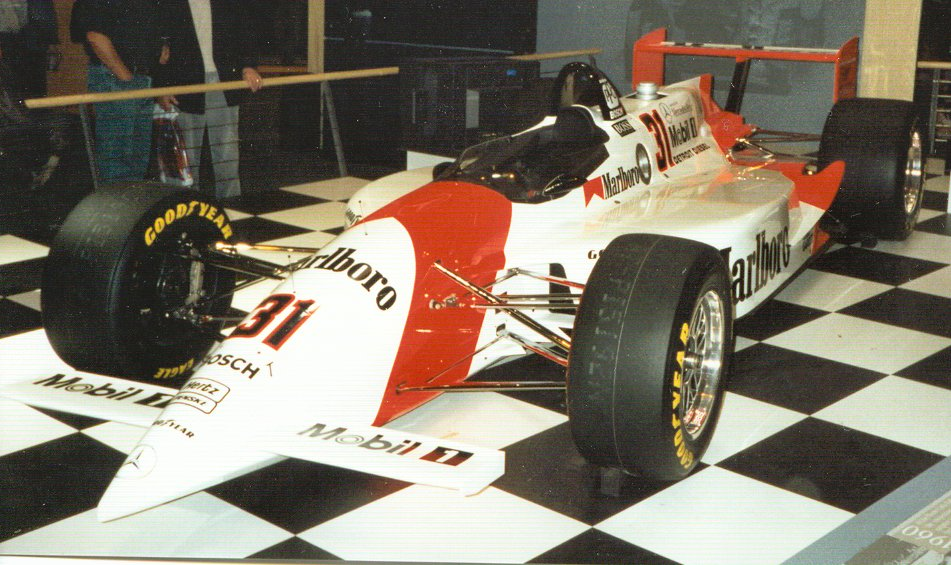
Penske PC-23 driven by Unser in 1994

In 1994, Unser again won at Indy, this time with Penske Racing. His teammates were Emerson Fittipaldi, the man whom he battled only five years earlier, and Paul Tracy. Unser turned in a dominant season-long performance, winning eight of sixteen races on his way to his second CART championship, as well as being named ABC's Wide World of Sports Athlete of the Year.

In 1995, Unser, along with teammate Emerson Fittipaldi, failed to qualify for the Indianapolis 500. Unser would later point to this incident as the trigger event for his descent into alcoholism and the breakup of his marriage.

He would finish second to Jacques Villeneuve in CART championship points in 1995. He finished fourth in 1996, despite still having a chance of winning the championship late in the season.

Unser ranked 13th in 1997, 11th in 1998 and 21st in 1999. He was not helped by the fact that he had to sit out two races after breaking his leg in a first-lap accident in the season-opener at Miami. Little Al's decline in performance coincided with the Penske team's struggles with their in-house chassis, Mercedes engines, and Goodyear tires- which were being abandoned by most teams during this era in favor of Firestones.

Team Penske began abandoning the much maligned in-house Penske chassis for Lola chassis in 1999. By the end of 1999, Unser and Penske parted ways. Combined with the death of Gonzalo Rodríguez, Penske replaced Unser and Rodriguez with Helio Castroneves and Gil de Ferran. Unser would leave CART to join the budding Indy Racing League for the 2000 campaign.

Unser won a total of 31 races during his seventeen seasons in CART. His career win total including IRL stands at 34, which is currently the sixth-most all-time in American open-wheel racing (as of 2013). As a two-time Indy 500 winner and two-time overall points champion, Unser enjoyed a decorated career as one of the most dynamic and successful drivers in American auto racing.(9)

=== Indy Racing League ===
Unser would go on to win a total of three races in his IRL career, but after breaking his pelvis in an all-terrain vehicle accident in October 2003, Unser had difficulty securing a ride for the 2004 season. He finally signed with Patrick Racing three races into the season, but after a 22nd-place finish in Richmond, Unser announced his retirement from racing on June 30, 2004. Unser continued to remain involved in racing, although outside of a driving capacity. He served as an adviser for Patrick Racing and worked as a mentor for his son, Al Richard Unser, who was working his way through the lower ranks of open-wheel racing.

=== Post-retirement racing and personal issues ===
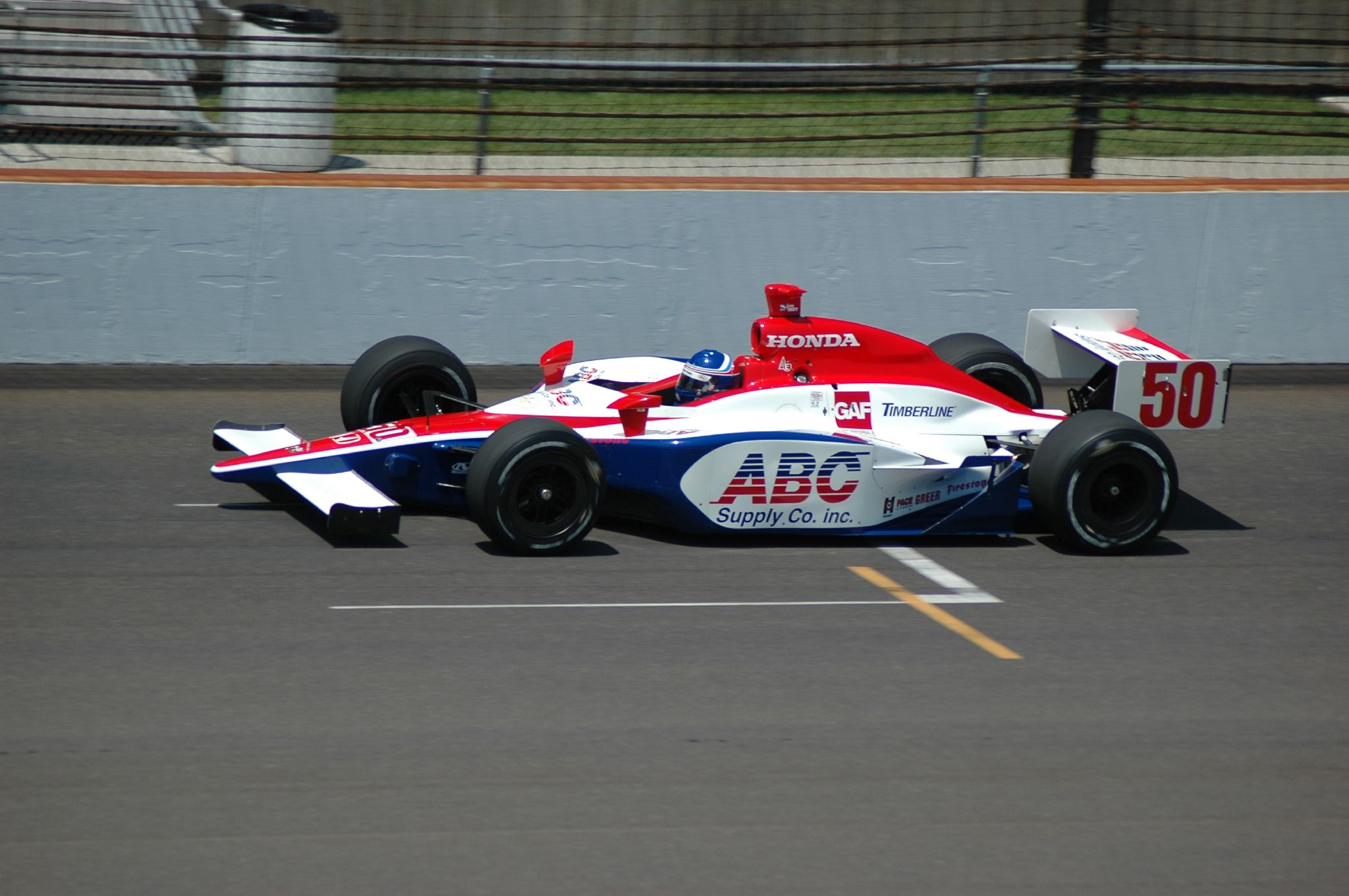
Unser practicing for the 2007 Indianapolis 500

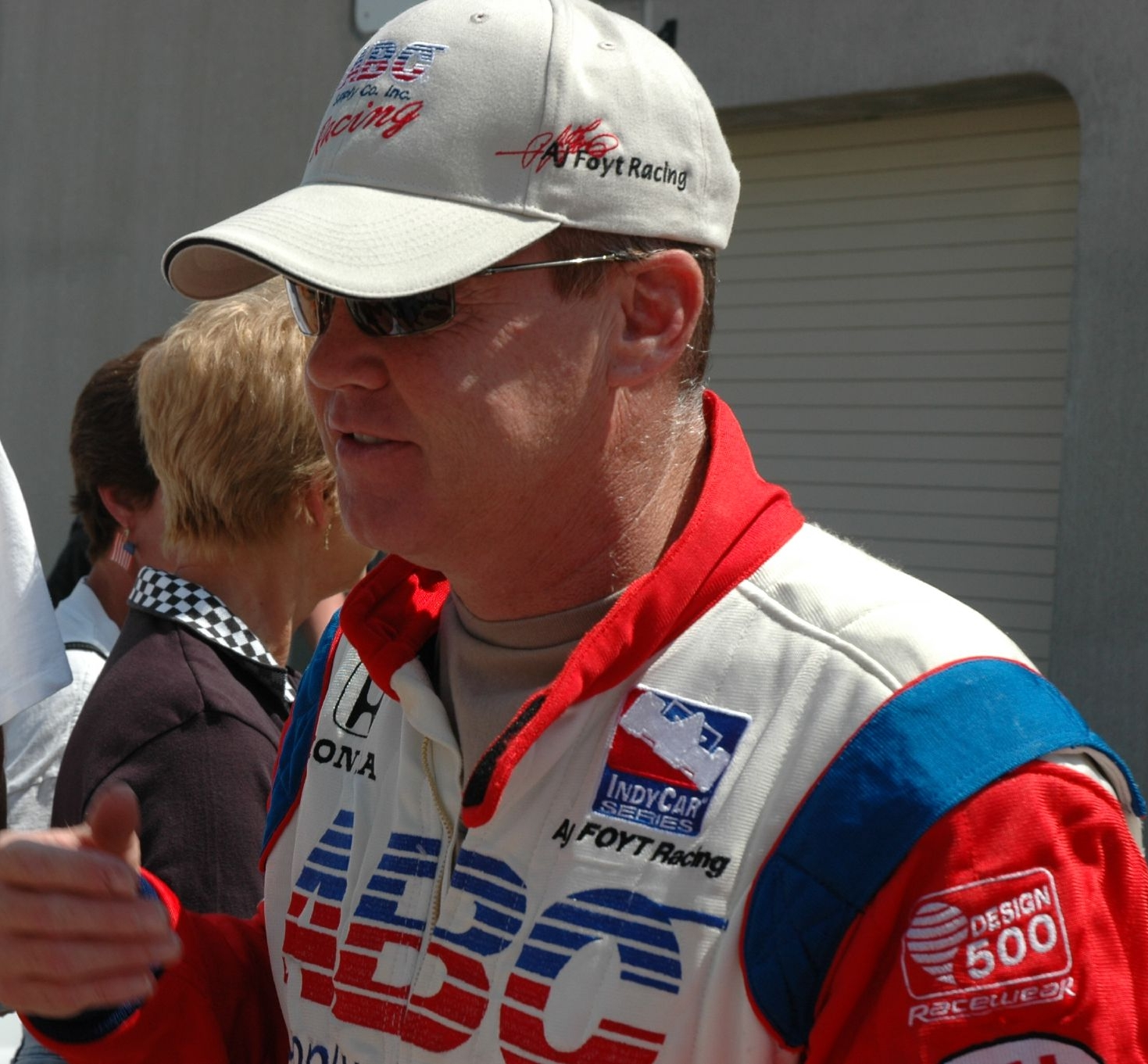
Unser before the 2007 Indianapolis 500

In 2006, Unser announced his return to racing and that he would run the 2006 Indianapolis 500, teamed with former winner Buddy Lazier for Dreyer & Reinbold Racing. This came just days after Michael Andretti also came out of retirement to run the 500. Unser qualified 27th in the 33-car field, and consistently ran in the upper half of the field until a crash ended his day.

In late August, Unser took part in an A1 Grand Prix test session at Silverstone.

On 25 January 2007, Unser was arrested near Henderson, Nevada and charged with driving under the influence, misdemeanor hit and run, failure to render aid in an accident, and failure to report an accident.

On May 2, 2007, it was announced that Unser would drive a car for A. J. Foyt in the 2007 Indianapolis 500, carrying the No. 50 on his car in recognition of Foyt's 50 years at Indianapolis. Unser qualified in the 25th starting position after being bumped from the lineup on the second day of qualifying.

On May 18, 2007, Unser spoke publicly for the first time about his battle with alcoholism when he joined forces with LIVE outside the Bottle, a national educational campaign, to help the public understand the need to address and treat alcoholism.

During the race weekend of the 2009 Toyota Grand Prix of Long Beach, Unser confirmed that his IndyCar career was over. During the weekend, he returned to the Toyota Pro/Celebrity Race that he won in 1985, and scored his second win in the event and his eighth Long Beach victory overall.

Unser is on the board of Baltimore Racing Development and helped announce plans for the 2011 Baltimore Grand Prix on August 17, 2009.

Unser was inducted into the Motorsports Hall of Fame of America in 2009.

On September 29, 2011, Unser was arrested in Albuquerque, New Mexico, on charges of reckless driving and aggravated driving while intoxicated. Charges stemmed from an incident where Unser reportedly drag raced his Chevrolet Suburban SUV at speeds over 100 mph (160 km/h). He was placed on indefinite suspension from his role with IndyCar.

In 2013, Unser entered a sportscar race at Thunderhill Raceway Park, the legendary 25 Hours of Thunderhill, racing with his son as teammates. Unser dominated the race, but co-driver Ivan Bellarosa crashed the car.

In 2014, once again at Long Beach, he participated in the Pro/Celebrity race, finishing fifth, only 6.115 seconds behind winner Brett Davern and four other celebrities, winning the Pro Division (with a 30-second disadvantage assessed to professionals) for his ninth Long Beach victory overall.

Later that year, Unser raced again at Indianapolis, participating in the Indy Legends Charity Pro/Am race, during the Sportscar Vintage Racing Association's Brickyard Vintage Racing Invitational event. This two-driver race included an Indianapolis 500 veteran in each car. Unser won the race, along with Peter Klutt, driving Klutt's 1969 Chevrolet Corvette. In so doing, Unser became the second driver to win on both the oval and road course at the Speedway.

In 2015, Unser participated in several Goodguys AutoCross competitions while racing Speedway Motors' 1970 Camaro. He also raced in the Sports Car Club of America Solo National Championship, placing second in his class, and is entered again at Thunderhill for the 25 Hours. Because of his age (over 50), Unser is eligible to drop down a level from professional class to an "amateur" class (Silver level) under the FIA driver rankings used for sportscar races, although the National Auto Sport Association does not use such ratings.

On May 20, 2019, just days before the 2019 Indianapolis 500, Unser was charged with DUI for a fourth time.

On October 1, 2021, Unser's memoir entitled A Checkered Past, co-authored by Jade Gurss, was published by Octane Press.

== Personal life ==
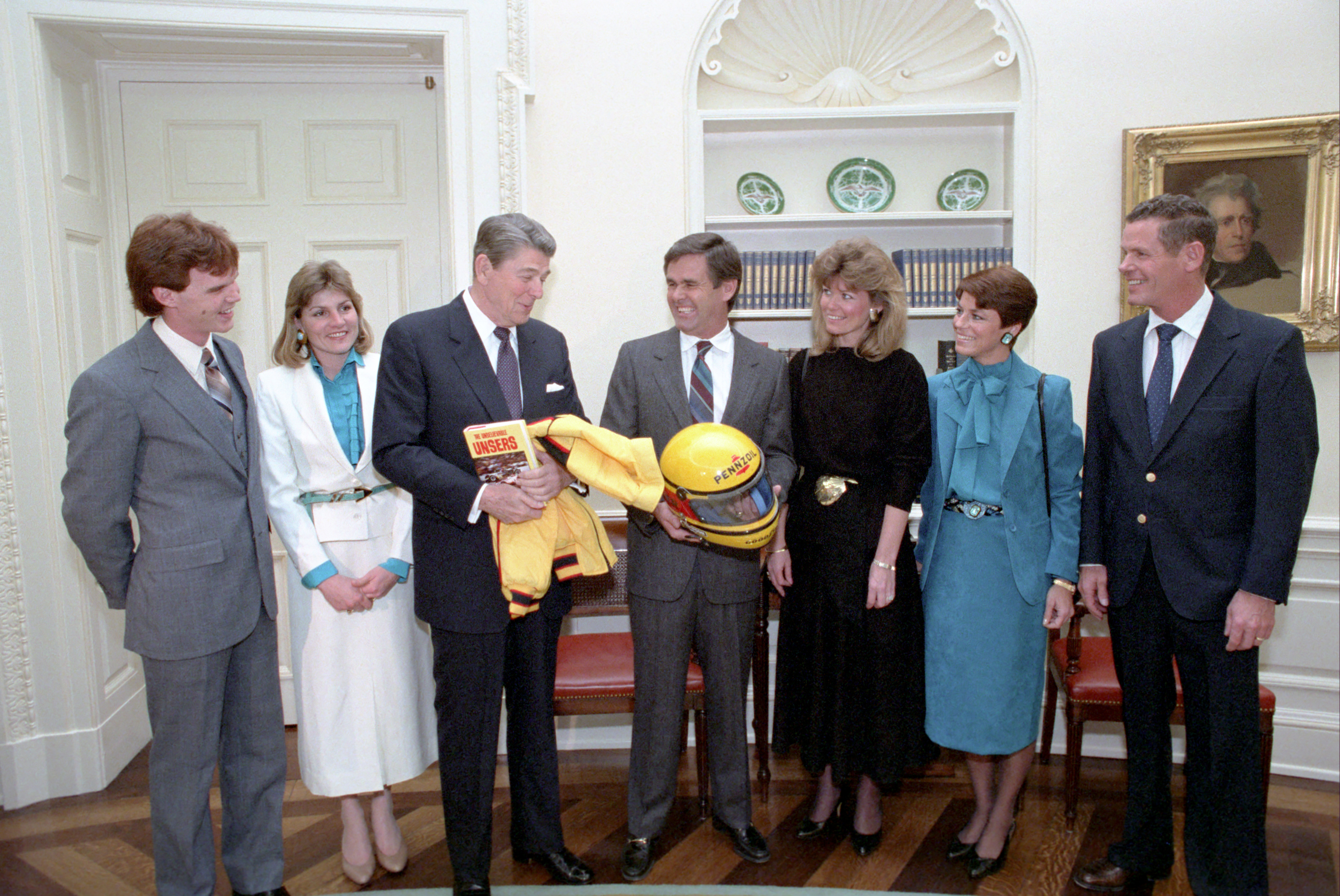
Unser Jr. (far left) with wife Shelley visiting United States president Ronald Reagan in 1986 along with father Al Unser, step-mother Karen Unser, uncle Bobby Unser, and aunt Marsha Unser

Unser married Shelley; the couple later divorced. He has four children, Al Richard Unser, Cody Unser, Shannon Unser, and Joe Unser. Cody lost the use of her legs on February 5, 1999, when she was twelve years old. She, along with her mother Shelley, founded the Cody Unser First Step Foundation at the age of thirteen and she wrote about the cause on U.S. News & World Report. Shelley Unser died on August 15, 2018. On September 30, 2021, Unser married Norma Lawrence.

== Motorsports career results ==
=== Sports car results ===
==== SCCA Can-Am ====
SCCA Can-Am results
Year	Team	Chassis	Engine	1	2	3	4	5	6	7	8	9	Rank	Points
1982	Galles Racing	Frissbee GR2	Chevy V8	**ATL**; 1	MOS; 1	**MOH**; 2	ROA; Ret	CTR; Ret	MOS; 1	CPL; 2	**RIV**; 2	**LAG**; 1	**1st**	**540**

=== American open-wheel racing results ===
(key) (Races in bold indicate pole position)

==== Formula Super Vee ====
Formula Super Vee results
Year	Team	Chassis	Engine	1	2	3	4	5	6	7	8	9	Rank	Points
1981	Galles Racing	Ralt RT5/81	VW Brabham	**CLT**; 1	MIL; 1	**WGl**; 3	ROA; 2	**BRN**; 1	MIL; 1	MCH; 3	RIV; Ret	**PHX**; 2	**1st**	**98**

==== PPG Indycar Series ====
CART results
Year	Team	No.	Chassis	Engine	1	2	3	4	5	6	7	8	9	10	11	12	13	14	15	16	17	18	19	20	Rank	Points	Ref
1982	Forsythe Racing	33	March 82C	Cosworth DFX V8t	PHX	ATL	MIL	CLE	MCH	MIL	POC	RIV; 5	ROA	MCH	PHX										21st	30	
1983	Galles Racing	17	Eagle 83	Cosworth DFX V8t	ATL; 6	INDY; 10		CLE; 9	MCH; 7	ROA; 2		RIV; 4	MOH; 18	MCH; 10	CPL; 10	LAG; 4	PHX; 8								7th	89	
1983	Galles Racing	17	March 83C	Cosworth DFX V8t			MIL; 13				POC; 2														7th	89	
1984	Galles Racing	7	March 84C	Cosworth DFX V8t	LBH; 17	PHX; 25	INDY; 21	MIL; 3	POR; 1	MEA; 4	CLE; 24	MCH; 26	ROA; 13	POC; 21	MOH; 19	SAN; 6	MCH; 6	PHX; 2	LAG; 4	CPL; 4					6th	103	
1985	Shierson Racing	30	Lola T900	Cosworth DFX V8t	LBH; 9	INDY; 25	MIL; 24	POR; 2	MEA; 1	CLE; 1	MCH; 15	ROA; 17	POC; 2	MOH; 4	SAN; 3	MCH; 23	LAG; 3	PHX; 2	MIA; 3						2nd	150	
1986	Shierson Racing	30	Lola T86/00	Cosworth DFX V8t	PHX; 12	LBH; 2	INDY; 5	MIL; 8	POR; 3	MEA; 9	CLE; 8	TOR; 4	MCH; 8	POC; 6	MOH; 5	SAN; 2	MCH; 21	ROA; 11	LAG; 23	PHX; 6	MIA; 1				4th	137	
1987	Shierson Racing	30	March 87C	Cosworth DFX V8t	LBH; 2	PHX; 14	INDY; 4	MIL; 5	POR; 20	MEA; 8	CLE; 3	TOR; 20	MCH; 18	POC; 23	ROA; 3	MOH; 23	NAZ; 6	LAG; 4	MIA; 2						3rd	107	
1988	Galles Racing	3	March 88C	Chevrolet 265A V8t	PHX; 18	LBH; 1	INDY; 13	MIL; 20	POR; 4	CLE; 4	TOR; 1	MEA; 1	MCH; 21	POC; 2	MOH; 4	ROA; 7	NAZ; 19	LAG; 6	MIA; 1						2nd	149	
1989	Galles Racing	2	Lola T89/00	Chevrolet 265A V8t	PHX; 2	**LBH**; 1	INDY; 2	MIL; 8	DET; 21	POR; 10	CLE; 7	MEA; 5	TOR; 20	MCH; 4	POC; 9	MOH; 2	ROA; 20	NAZ; 4	LAG; 3						5th	136	
1990	Galles-Kraco Racing	5	Lola T90/00	Chevrolet 265A V8t	PHX; 3	**LBH**; 1	INDY; 4	MIL; 1	DET; 27	POR; 3	CLE; 15	MEA; 11	TOR; 1	MCH; 1	DEN; 1	VAN; 1	MOH; 3	ROA; 4	NAZ; 16	LAG; 2					1st	210	
1991	Galles-Kraco Racing	1	Lola T91/00	Chevrolet 265A V8t	SRF; 16	LBH; 1	PHX; 6	INDY; 4	MIL; 19	DET; 4	POR; 4	CLE; 4	MEA; 2	TOR; 23	MCH; 3	DEN; 1	VAN; 3	MOH; 5	ROA; 2	NAZ; 4	LAG; 2				3rd	197	
1992	Galles-Kraco Racing	3	Galmer G92	Chevrolet 265A V8t	**SRF**; 4	PHX; 5	LBH; 4	INDY; 1	DET; 9	POR; 3	MIL; 7	NHA; 8	TOR; 7	MCH; 4	CLE; 3	ROA; 2	VAN; 2	MOH; 3	NAZ; 11	LAG; 9					3rd	169	
1993	Galles Racing	3	Lola T93/00	Chevrolet 265C V8t	SRF; 15	PHX; 4	LBH; 21	INDY; 8	MIL; 5	DET; 6	POR; 5	CLE; 19	TOR; 5	MCH; 8	NHA; 8	ROA; 25	VAN; 1	MOH; 8	NAZ; 25	LAG; 5					7th	100	
1994	Team Penske	31	Penske PC-23	Ilmor 265D V8t	SRF; 14	PHX; 2	LBH; 1		MIL; 1	DET; 10	**POR**; 1	**CLE**; 1	TOR; 29	MCH; 8	**MOH**; 1	NHA; 1	VAN; 1	ROA; 2	NAZ; 2	LAG; 20					1st	225	
1994	Team Penske	31	Penske PC-23	Mercedes-Benz 500I V8t				**INDY**; 1																	1st	225	
1995	Team Penske	1	Penske PC-24	Mercedes-Benz IC108B V8t	MIA; 15	SRF; 6	PHX; 8	LBH; 1	NAZ; 13	INDY; DNQ	MIL; 2	DET; 5	POR; 1	ROA; 28	TOR; 26	CLE; 18	MCH; 2	MOH; 1	NHA; 3	VAN; 1	LAG; 6				2nd	161	
1996	Team Penske	2	Penske PC-25	Mercedes-Benz IC108C V8t	MIA; 8	RIO; 2	SRF; 9	LBH; 3	NAZ; 3	500; 8	MIL; 2	DET; 22	POR; 4	CLE; 4	TOR; 13	MCH; 4	MOH; 13	ROA; 10	VAN; 5	LAG; 16					4th	125	
1997	Team Penske	2	Penske PC-26	Mercedes-Benz IC108D V8t	MIA; 27	SRF; 27	LBH; 4	NAZ; 3	RIO; 7	GAT; 18	MIL; 20	DET; 8	POR; 25	CLE; 4	TOR; 20	MCH; 20	MOH; 22	ROA; 7	VAN; 5	LAG; 11	FON; 22				13th	67	
1998	Team Penske	2	Penske PC-27	Mercedes-Benz IC108E V8t	MIA; 22	MOT; 2	LBH; 29	NAZ; 15	RIO; 16	GAT; 19	MIL; 3	DET; 24	POR; 5	CLE; 17	TOR; 17	MCH; 22	MOH; 6	ROA; 27	VAN; 5	LAG; 6	HOU; 7	SRF; 22	FON; 27		11th	72	
1999	Team Penske	2	Penske PC-27B	Mercedes-Benz IC108E V8t	MIA; 26	MOT	LBH	NAZ; 24	RIO; 12							MCH; 13						HOU; 15	SRF; 22	FON; 7	21st	26	
1999	Team Penske	2	Lola B99/00	Mercedes-Benz IC108E V8t						GAT; 12	MIL; 19	POR; 16	CLE; 5	ROA; 9	TOR; 9		DET; 15	MOH; 25	CHI; 25	VAN; 25	LAG; DNS				21st	26	

==== IndyCar Series ====
(key)

IndyCar Series results
Year	Team	No.	Chassis	Engine	1	2	3	4	5	6	7	8	9	10	11	12	13	14	15	16	17	Rank	Points	Ref
2000	Galles Racing	3	G-Force GF05	Oldsmobile Aurora V8	WDW; 25	PHX; 9	LVS; 1	INDY; 29	TXS; 3	PPIR; 10	ATL; 3	KTY; 27	TXS; 17									9th	188	
2001	Galles Racing	3	G-Force GF05B	Oldsmobile Aurora V8	PHX; 23	HMS; 6	ATL; 17	INDY; 30	TXS; 8	PPIR; 11	RIR; 3	KAN; 20	NSH; 14	KTY; 4	GAT; 1	CHI; 8	TXS; 6					7th	287	
2002	Kelley Racing	7	Dallara IR-02	Chevrolet Indy V8	HMS; 19	PHX; 5	FON; 11	NAZ; 12	INDY; 12	TXS; 2	PPIR; 6	RIR; 5	KAN; 17	NSH	MCH	KTY; 6	GAT; 7	CHI; 2	TXS; 20			7th	311	
2003	Kelley Racing	31	Dallara IR-03	Toyota Indy V8	HMS; 13	PHX; 4	MOT; 5	INDY; 9	TXS; 1	PPIR; 14	RIR; 10	KAN; 14	NSH; 8	MCH; 9	GAT; 20	KTY; 4	NAZ; 6	CHI; 19	FON; 9	TXS; 9		6th	374	
2004	Patrick Racing	20	Dallara IR-04	Chevrolet Indy V8	HMS	PHX	MOT	INDY; 17	TXS; 11	RIR; 21	KAN	NSH	MIL	MCH	KTY	PPIR	NAZ	CHI	FON	TXS		25th	44	
2006	Dreyer & Reinbold Racing	31	Dallara IR-05	Honda HI6R V8	HMS	STP	MOT	INDY; 24	WGL	TXS	RIR	KAN	NSH	MIL	MCH	KTY	SNM	CHI				35th	12	
2007	A. J. Foyt Enterprises	50	Dallara IR-05	Honda HI6R V8	HMS	STP	MOT	KAN	INDY; 26	MIL	TXS	IOW	RIR	WGL	NSH	MOH	MCH	KTY	SNM	DET	CHI	32nd	10	

===== Indianapolis 500 results =====
Year	Chassis	Engine	Start	Finish	Team
1983	Eagle	Cosworth	5	10	Galles
1984	March	Cosworth	15	21	Galles
1985	Lola	Cosworth	11	25	Shierson Racing
1986	Lola	Cosworth	9	5	Shierson Racing
1987	March	Cosworth	22	4	Shierson Racing
1988	March	Chevrolet	5	13	Galles
1989	Lola	Chevrolet	8	2	Galles
1990	Lola	Chevrolet	7	4	Galles/Kraco
1991	Lola	Chevrolet	6	4	Galles/Kraco
1992	Galmer	Chevrolet	12	**1**	Galles/Kraco
1993	Lola	Chevrolet	5	8	Galles
1994	Penske	Ilmor-Mercedes	**1**	**1**	Penske
1995	Lola	Ilmor-Mercedes	DNQ		Penske
2000	G-Force	Oldsmobile	18	29	Galles
2001	G-Force	Oldsmobile	19	30	Galles
2002	Dallara	Chevrolet	12	12	Kelley
2003	Dallara	Toyota	17	9	Kelley
2004	Dallara	Chevrolet	17	17	Patrick
2006	Dallara	Honda	27	24	Dreyer & Reinbold
2007	Dallara	Honda	25	26	Foyt

=== NASCAR ===
(key) (Bold – Pole position awarded by qualifying time. Italics – Pole position earned by points standings or practice time. * – Most laps led.)

==== Winston Cup Series ====
NASCAR Winston Cup Series results
Year	Team	No.	Make	1	2	3	4	5	6	7	8	9	10	11	12	13	14	15	16	17	18	19	20	21	22	23	24	25	26	27	28	29	30	NWCC	Pts	Ref
1993	Hendrick Motorsports	46	Chevy	DAY; 36	CAR	RCH	ATL	DAR	BRI	NWS	MAR	TAL	SON	CLT	DOV	POC	MCH	DAY	NHA	POC	TAL	GLN	MCH	BRI	DAR	RCH	DOV	MAR	NWS	CLT	CAR	PHO	ATL	81st	55	

===== Daytona 500 =====
Year	Team	Manufacturer	Start	Finish
1993	Hendrick Motorsports	Chevrolet	40	36

=== International Race of Champions ===
(key) (Bold – Pole position. * – Most laps led.)

International Race of Champions results
Season	Make	1	2	3	4	Pos.	Pts	Ref
1986	Chevy	DAY; 11	MOH; 1*	TAL; 7	GLN; 1	1st	62	
1987	Chevy	DAY; 5	MOH; 4	MCH; 1*	GLN; 2	2nd	65	
1988	Chevy	DAY; 4	RSD; 3	MCH; 3	GLN; 1*	1st	66	
1989	Chevy	DAY; 4	NZH; 4	MCH; 5	GLN; 1*	2nd	60	
1990	Dodge	TAL; 2	CLE; 2	MCH; 5		2nd	44	
1991	Dodge	DAY; 4	TAL; 10	MCH; 3	GLN; 3	5th	47	
1992	Dodge	DAY; 6	TAL; 7*	MCH; 7	MCH; 1*	3rd	59	
1993	Dodge	DAY; 3	DAR	TAL; 1*	MCH; 3	2nd	60.5	
1994	Dodge	DAY; 2	DAR; 10	TAL; 5	MCH; 1	2nd	56	
1995	Dodge	DAY; 10*	DAR	TAL	**MCH**; 1*	7th	42	
1996	Pontiac	DAY; 5	TAL; 1	CLT; 8	MCH; 5	5th	48	
1997	Pontiac	DAY; 1*	CLT; 5	CAL; 6	MCH; 4	4th	57	
1998	Pontiac	DAY; 8	CAL; 2	MCH; 12	IND; 2	4th	46	
2001	Pontiac	DAY	TAL	MCH; 2	IND; 5	NA	0	
2002	Pontiac	DAY; 5*	CAL; 8	CHI; 2	IND	7th	39	

== Video games ==
- Al Unser Jr.'s Turbo Racing, a 1990 NES game featuring Unser.
- Al Unser Jr.'s Road to the Top, a 1994 SNES game.
- An unreleased Sega Genesis game featuring Unser titled Al Unser Jr. Racing was showcased at the 1994 SCES.
- Al Unser Jr. Arcade Racing, a 1995 computer game featuring Unser.

== Bibliography ==
- Unser Jr., Al (October 1, 2021). Al Unser Jr: A Checkered Past. Octane Press. ISBN 9781642340457.

Sporting positions
Preceded by Peter Kuhn	US Formula Super Vee; Champion; 1981	Succeeded by Michael Andretti
Preceded by Rick Mears	Indianapolis 500 Winner; 1992	Succeeded by Emerson Fittipaldi
Preceded by Emerson Fittipaldi	Indianapolis 500 Winner; 1994	Succeeded by Jacques Villeneuve
Preceded by Emerson Fittipaldi	CART Champion; 1990	Succeeded by Michael Andretti
Preceded by Nigel Mansell	CART Champion; 1994	Succeeded by Jacques Villeneuve
Preceded by Harry Gant	IROC Champion; IROC X (1986)	Succeeded by Geoff Bodine
Preceded by Geoff Bodine	IROC Champion; IROC XII (1988)	Succeeded by Terry Labonte
Preceded by Geoff Brabham	Can-Am Champion; 1982	Succeeded by Jacques-Joseph Villeneuve
