= 1993 Pepsi 400 =

15th race of the 1993 NASCAR Winston Cup Series

Race details
- Race 15 of 30 in the 1993 NASCAR Winston Cup Series
- The 1993 Pepsi 400 program cover.
- Date: July 3, 1993
- Official name: 35th Annual Pepsi 400
- Location: Daytona Beach, Florida, Daytona International Speedway
- Course: Permanent racing facility
- Course length: 2.5 miles (4.0 km)
- Distance: 160 laps, 400 mi (643.737 km)
- Scheduled distance: 160 laps, 400 mi (643.737 km)
- Average speed: 151.755 miles per hour (244.226 km/h)
- Attendance: 102,000

Pole position
Driver	Ernie Irvan	Morgan-McClure Motorsports
- Time: 47.287

Most laps led
Driver	Dale Earnhardt	Richard Childress Racing
- Laps: 110

Winner
No. 3	Dale Earnhardt	Richard Childress Racing

Television in the United States
- Network: ESPN
- Announcers: Bob Jenkins, Benny Parsons, Ned Jarrett

Radio in the United States
- Radio: Motor Racing Network

The 1993 Pepsi 400 was the 15th stock car race of the 1993 NASCAR Winston Cup Series season and the 35th iteration of the event. The race was held on Saturday, July 3, 1993, in Daytona Beach, Florida at Daytona International Speedway, a 2.5 miles (4.0 km) permanent triangular-shaped superspeedway. The race took the scheduled 160 laps to complete. At race's end, Richard Childress Racing driver Dale Earnhardt would manage to fend off the field on the final restart with nine to go to take his 57th career NASCAR Winston Cup Series victory and his fourth victory of the season. To fill out the top three, Stavola Brothers Racing driver Sterling Marlin and Hendrick Motorsports driver Ken Schrader would finish second and third, respectively.

== Background ==
The layout of Daytona International Speedway, the venue where the race was held.

Daytona International Speedway is one of three superspeedways to hold NASCAR races, the other two being Indianapolis Motor Speedway and Talladega Superspeedway. The standard track at Daytona International Speedway is a four-turn superspeedway that is 2.5 miles (4.0 km) long. The track's turns are banked at 31 degrees, while the front stretch, the location of the finish line, is banked at 18 degrees.

=== Entry list ===
- (R) denotes rookie driver.

#	Driver	Team	Make
0	Delma Cowart	H. L. Waters Racing	Ford
1	Rick Mast	Precision Products Racing	Ford
2	Rusty Wallace	Penske Racing South	Pontiac
3	Dale Earnhardt	Richard Childress Racing	Chevrolet
4	Ernie Irvan	Morgan–McClure Motorsports	Chevrolet
5	Ricky Rudd	Hendrick Motorsports	Chevrolet
6	Mark Martin	Roush Racing	Ford
7	Jimmy Hensley	AK Racing	Ford
8	Sterling Marlin	Stavola Brothers Racing	Ford
9	P. J. Jones (R)	Melling Racing	Ford
11	Bill Elliott	Junior Johnson & Associates	Ford
12	Jimmy Spencer	Bobby Allison Motorsports	Ford
14	Terry Labonte	Hagan Racing	Chevrolet
15	Geoff Bodine	Bud Moore Engineering	Ford
16	Wally Dallenbach Jr.	Roush Racing	Ford
17	Darrell Waltrip	Darrell Waltrip Motorsports	Chevrolet
18	Dale Jarrett	Joe Gibbs Racing	Chevrolet
20	Bobby Hamilton	Moroso Racing	Ford
21	Morgan Shepherd	Wood Brothers Racing	Ford
22	Bobby Labonte (R)	Bill Davis Racing	Ford
23	Eddie Bierschwale	B&B Racing	Oldsmobile
24	Jeff Gordon (R)	Hendrick Motorsports	Chevrolet
25	Ken Schrader	Hendrick Motorsports	Chevrolet
26	Brett Bodine	King Racing	Ford
27	Hut Stricklin	Junior Johnson & Associates	Ford
28	Davey Allison	Robert Yates Racing	Ford
29	Kerry Teague	Linro Motorsports	Chevrolet
30	Michael Waltrip	Bahari Racing	Pontiac
31	Stan Fox	Folsom Racing	Chevrolet
32	Jimmy Horton	Active Motorsports	Chevrolet
33	Harry Gant	Leo Jackson Motorsports	Chevrolet
35	Bill Venturini	Venturini Motorsports	Chevrolet
37	Loy Allen Jr.	TriStar Motorsports	Ford
40	Kenny Wallace (R)	SABCO Racing	Pontiac
41	Phil Parsons	Larry Hedrick Motorsports	Chevrolet
42	Kyle Petty	SABCO Racing	Pontiac
44	Rick Wilson	Petty Enterprises	Pontiac
45	Rich Bickle	Terminal Trucking Motorsports	Ford
48	James Hylton	Hylton Motorsports	Pontiac
49	Stanley Smith	BS&S Motorsports	Chevrolet
51	Jeff Purvis	Phoenix Racing	Chevrolet
52	Jimmy Means	Jimmy Means Racing	Ford
53	Ritchie Petty	Petty Brothers Racing	Ford
55	Ted Musgrave	RaDiUs Motorsports	Ford
59	Andy Belmont	Andy Belmont Racing	Ford
62	Clay Young	Jimmy Means Racing	Ford
65	Jerry O'Neil	Aroneck Racing	Chevrolet
68	Greg Sacks	TriStar Motorsports	Ford
71	Dave Marcis	Marcis Auto Racing	Chevrolet
73	Phil Barkdoll	Barkdoll Racing	Oldsmobile
75	Dick Trickle	Butch Mock Motorsports	Ford
77	Mike Potter	Gray Racing	Ford
82	Mark Stahl	Stahl Racing	Ford
83	Lake Speed	Speed Racing	Ford
85	Ken Bouchard	Mansion Motorsports	Ford
86	Mark Thompson	Gray Racing	Ford
89	Jim Sauter	Mueller Brothers Racing	Ford
90	Bobby Hillin Jr.	Donlavey Racing	Ford
95	Jeremy Mayfield	Sadler Brothers Racing	Ford
98	Derrike Cope	Cale Yarborough Motorsports	Ford
99	Brad Teague	Ball Motorsports	Ford

== Qualifying ==
Qualifying was split into two rounds. The first round was held on Thursday, July 1, at 2:30 PM EST. Each driver would have one lap to set a time. During the first round, the top 20 drivers in the round would be guaranteed a starting spot in the race. If a driver was not able to guarantee a spot in the first round, they had the option to scrub their time from the first round and try and run a faster lap time in a second round qualifying run, held on Friday, July 2, at 1:00 PM EST. As with the first round, each driver would have one lap to set a time. For this specific race, positions 21-40 would be decided on time, and depending on who needed it, a select amount of positions were given to cars who had not otherwise qualified but were high enough in owner's points; up to two provisionals were given. If needed, a past champion who did not qualify on either time or provisionals could use a champion's provisional, adding one more spot to the field.

Ernie Irvan, driving for Morgan–McClure Motorsports, won the pole, setting a time of 47.287 and an average speed of 190.327 mph (306.302 km/h) in the first round.

20 drivers would fail to qualify.

=== Full qualifying results ===
Pos.	#	Driver	Team	Make	Time	Speed
1	4	Ernie Irvan	Morgan–McClure Motorsports	Chevrolet	47.287	190.327
2	42	Kyle Petty	SABCO Racing	Pontiac	47.361	190.030
3	28	Davey Allison	Robert Yates Racing	Ford	47.400	189.873
4	98	Derrike Cope	Cale Yarborough Motorsports	Ford	47.565	189.215
5	3	Dale Earnhardt	Richard Childress Racing	Chevrolet	47.652	188.869
6	11	Bill Elliott	Junior Johnson & Associates	Ford	47.656	188.853
7	33	Harry Gant	Leo Jackson Motorsports	Chevrolet	47.707	188.652
8	17	Darrell Waltrip	Darrell Waltrip Motorsports	Chevrolet	47.716	188.616
9	44	Rick Wilson	Petty Enterprises	Pontiac	47.725	188.580
10	5	Ricky Rudd	Hendrick Motorsports	Chevrolet	47.742	188.513
11	30	Michael Waltrip	Bahari Racing	Pontiac	47.764	188.426
12	1	Rick Mast	Precision Products Racing	Ford	47.778	188.371
13	18	Dale Jarrett	Joe Gibbs Racing	Chevrolet	47.855	188.068
14	55	Ted Musgrave	RaDiUs Motorsports	Ford	47.858	188.056
15	27	Hut Stricklin	Junior Johnson & Associates	Ford	47.897	187.903
16	26	Brett Bodine	King Racing	Ford	47.917	187.825
17	2	Rusty Wallace	Penske Racing South	Pontiac	47.944	187.719
18	6	Mark Martin	Roush Racing	Ford	47.949	187.699
19	7	Jimmy Hensley	AK Racing	Ford	47.954	187.680
20	21	Morgan Shepherd	Wood Brothers Racing	Ford	47.978	187.586
Failed to lock in Round 1
21	15	Geoff Bodine	Bud Moore Engineering	Ford	48.024	187.406
22	8	Sterling Marlin	Stavola Brothers Racing	Ford	48.024	187.406
23	68	Greg Sacks	TriStar Motorsports	Ford	48.053	187.293
24	71	Dave Marcis	Marcis Auto Racing	Chevrolet	48.070	187.227
25	90	Bobby Hillin Jr.	Donlavey Racing	Ford	48.090	187.149
26	22	Bobby Labonte (R)	Bill Davis Racing	Ford	48.099	187.114
27	24	Jeff Gordon (R)	Hendrick Motorsports	Chevrolet	48.101	187.106
28	12	Jimmy Spencer	Bobby Allison Motorsports	Ford	48.108	187.079
29	16	Wally Dallenbach Jr.	Roush Racing	Ford	48.122	187.025
30	20	Bobby Hamilton	Moroso Racing	Ford	48.131	186.990
31	14	Terry Labonte	Hagan Racing	Chevrolet	48.183	186.788
32	40	Kenny Wallace (R)	SABCO Racing	Pontiac	48.194	186.745
33	51	Jeff Purvis	Phoenix Racing	Chevrolet	48.219	186.648
34	52	Jimmy Means	Jimmy Means Racing	Ford	48.245	186.548
35	41	Phil Parsons	Larry Hedrick Motorsports	Chevrolet	48.349	186.147
36	9	P. J. Jones (R)	Melling Racing	Ford	48.459	185.724
37	53	Ritchie Petty	Petty Brothers Racing	Ford	48.480	185.644
38	75	Dick Trickle	Butch Mock Motorsports	Ford	48.683	184.869
39	32	Jimmy Horton	Active Motorsports	Chevrolet	48.807	184.400
40	37	Loy Allen Jr.	TriStar Motorsports	Ford	48.992	183.703
Provisional
41	25	Ken Schrader	Hendrick Motorsports	Chevrolet	49.297	182.567
Failed to qualify
42	45	Rich Bickle	Terminal Trucking Motorsports	Ford	49.126	183.202
43	62	Clay Young	Jimmy Means Racing	Ford	49.260	182.704
44	29	Kerry Teague	Linro Motorsports	Chevrolet	-*	-*
45	0	Delma Cowart	H. L. Waters Racing	Ford	-*	-*
46	31	Stan Fox	Folsom Racing	Chevrolet	-*	-*
47	49	Stanley Smith	BS&S Motorsports	Chevrolet	-*	-*
48	35	Bill Venturini	Venturini Motorsports	Chevrolet	-*	-*
49	65	Jerry O'Neil	Aroneck Racing	Chevrolet	-*	-*
50	48	James Hylton	Hylton Motorsports	Pontiac	-*	-*
51	73	Phil Barkdoll	Barkdoll Racing	Chevrolet	-*	-*
52	59	Andy Belmont	Andy Belmont Racing	Ford	-*	-*
53	77	Mike Potter	Gray Racing	Ford	-*	-*
54	86	Mark Thompson	Gray Racing	Ford	-*	-*
55	82	Mark Stahl	Stahl Racing	Ford	-*	-*
56	83	Lake Speed	Speed Racing	Ford	-*	-*
57	85	Ken Bouchard	Mansion Motorsports	Ford	-*	-*
58	89	Jim Sauter	Mueller Brothers Racing	Ford	-*	-*
59	95	Jeremy Mayfield	Sadler Brothers Racing	Ford	-*	-*
60	23	Eddie Bierschwale	B&B Racing	Oldsmobile	-*	-*
61	99	Brad Teague	Ball Motorsports	Ford	-*	-*
Official first round qualifying results
Official starting lineup

== Race results ==
Fin	St	#	Driver	Team	Make	Laps	Led	Status	Pts	Winnings
1	5	3	Dale Earnhardt	Richard Childress Racing	Chevrolet	160	110	running	185	$75,940
2	22	8	Sterling Marlin	Stavola Brothers Racing	Ford	160	20	running	175	$46,000
3	41	25	Ken Schrader	Hendrick Motorsports	Chevrolet	160	4	running	170	$37,125
4	10	5	Ricky Rudd	Hendrick Motorsports	Chevrolet	160	1	running	165	$28,250
5	27	24	Jeff Gordon (R)	Hendrick Motorsports	Chevrolet	160	3	running	160	$24,625
6	18	6	Mark Martin	Roush Racing	Ford	160	4	running	155	$23,550
7	1	4	Ernie Irvan	Morgan–McClure Motorsports	Chevrolet	160	5	running	151	$29,100
8	13	18	Dale Jarrett	Joe Gibbs Racing	Chevrolet	160	3	running	147	$21,150
9	31	14	Terry Labonte	Hagan Racing	Chevrolet	160	0	running	138	$18,050
10	14	55	Ted Musgrave	RaDiUs Motorsports	Ford	160	0	running	134	$19,500
11	9	44	Rick Wilson	Petty Enterprises	Pontiac	160	0	running	130	$15,490
12	25	90	Bobby Hillin Jr.	Donlavey Racing	Ford	160	0	running	127	$10,260
13	8	17	Darrell Waltrip	Darrell Waltrip Motorsports	Chevrolet	160	2	running	129	$19,770
14	20	21	Morgan Shepherd	Wood Brothers Racing	Ford	160	0	running	121	$14,930
15	23	68	Greg Sacks	TriStar Motorsports	Ford	160	0	running	118	$9,940
16	12	1	Rick Mast	Precision Products Racing	Ford	160	0	running	115	$14,300
17	30	20	Bobby Hamilton	Moroso Racing	Ford	160	0	running	112	$9,085
18	17	2	Rusty Wallace	Penske Racing South	Pontiac	160	0	running	109	$16,870
19	16	26	Brett Bodine	King Racing	Ford	160	1	running	111	$13,555
20	6	11	Bill Elliott	Junior Johnson & Associates	Ford	159	0	running	103	$19,140
21	7	33	Harry Gant	Leo Jackson Motorsports	Chevrolet	159	0	running	100	$17,170
22	11	30	Michael Waltrip	Bahari Racing	Pontiac	159	0	running	97	$12,900
23	33	51	Jeff Purvis	Phoenix Racing	Chevrolet	159	0	running	94	$7,860
24	4	98	Derrike Cope	Cale Yarborough Motorsports	Ford	158	5	running	96	$13,010
25	35	41	Phil Parsons	Larry Hedrick Motorsports	Chevrolet	158	0	running	88	$9,290
26	38	75	Dick Trickle	Butch Mock Motorsports	Ford	158	0	running	85	$7,470
27	24	71	Dave Marcis	Marcis Auto Racing	Chevrolet	158	1	running	87	$7,325
28	32	40	Kenny Wallace (R)	SABCO Racing	Pontiac	157	0	running	79	$9,305
29	40	37	Loy Allen Jr.	TriStar Motorsports	Ford	157	0	running	76	$7,110
30	36	9	P. J. Jones (R)	Melling Racing	Ford	157	0	running	73	$7,515
31	3	28	Davey Allison	Robert Yates Racing	Ford	149	0	running	70	$17,810
32	37	53	Ritchie Petty	Petty Brothers Racing	Ford	114	0	ignition	67	$6,930
33	2	42	Kyle Petty	SABCO Racing	Pontiac	105	1	fatigue	69	$15,900
34	19	7	Jimmy Hensley	AK Racing	Ford	59	0	crash	61	$17,270
35	29	16	Wally Dallenbach Jr.	Roush Racing	Ford	55	0	engine	58	$11,415
36	34	52	Jimmy Means	Jimmy Means Racing	Ford	37	0	engine	55	$6,810
37	21	15	Geoff Bodine	Bud Moore Engineering	Ford	30	0	engine	52	$14,780
38	39	32	Jimmy Horton	Active Motorsports	Chevrolet	22	0	crash	49	$6,765
39	28	12	Jimmy Spencer	Bobby Allison Motorsports	Ford	21	0	crash	46	$11,305
40	15	27	Hut Stricklin	Junior Johnson & Associates	Ford	21	0	crash	43	$11,240
41	26	22	Bobby Labonte (R)	Bill Davis Racing	Ford	21	0	crash	40	$8,215
Official race results

== Standings after the race ==
Drivers' Championship standings

	Pos	Driver	Points
	1	Dale Earnhardt	2,342
	2	Dale Jarrett	2,091 (-251)
	3	Rusty Wallace	1,997 (-345)
1	4	Morgan Shepherd	1,991 (–351)
2	5	Ken Schrader	1,977 (–365)
2	6	Kyle Petty	1,946 (–396)
1	7	Davey Allison	1,934 (–408)
2	8	Jeff Gordon	1,905 (–437)
2	9	Ernie Irvan	1,889 (–453)
2	10	Mark Martin	1,873 (–469)
Official driver's standings

- Note: Only the first 10 positions are included for the driver standings.

Previous race: 1993 Miller Genuine Draft 400 (Michigan)	NASCAR Winston Cup Series; 1993 season	Next race: 1993 Slick 50 300
