= 1993 Miller Genuine Draft 500 =

17th race of the 1993 NASCAR Winston Cup Series

Race details
- Race 17 of 30 in the 1993 NASCAR Winston Cup Series
- The 1994 Miller Genuine Draft 500 program cover, featuring Rusty Wallace.
- Date: July 18, 1993
- Official name: 21st Annual Miller Genuine Draft 500
- Location: Long Pond, Pennsylvania, Pocono Raceway
- Course: Permanent racing facility
- Course length: 2.5 miles (4.0 km)
- Distance: 200 laps, 500 mi (804.672 km)
- Scheduled distance: 200 laps, 500 mi (804.672 km)
- Average speed: 133.343 miles per hour (214.595 km/h)

Pole position
| Driver | Ken Schrader | Hendrick Motorsports |
- Time: 55.237

Most laps led
| Driver | Dale Earnhardt | Richard Childress Racing |
- Laps: 71

Winner
| No. 3 | Dale Earnhardt | Richard Childress Racing |

Television in the United States
- Network: TBS
- Announcers: Ken Squier, Neil Bonnett

Radio in the United States
- Radio: Motor Racing Network

The 1993 Miller Genuine Draft 500 was the 17th stock car race of the 1993 NASCAR Winston Cup Series season and the 25th iteration of the event. The race was held on Sunday, July 18, 1993, in Long Pond, Pennsylvania, at Pocono Raceway, a 2.5 miles (4.0 km) triangular permanent course. The race took the scheduled 200 laps to complete. At race's end, Richard Childress Racing driver Dale Earnhardt would manage to defend the field on the final restart with 11 to go to take his 58th career NASCAR Winston Cup Series victory and his fifth victory of the season. To fill out the top three, Penske Racing South driver Rusty Wallace and Junior Johnson & Associates driver Bill Elliott would finish second and third, respectively.

The race weekend was marred by the death of Robert Yates Racing driver Davey Allison, who had died in a helicopter crash on July 13. En route to Talladega Superspeedway to watch friends race on July 12, he would crash his helicopter while trying to land. Due to a critical head injury, he would die the next morning.

== Background ==
The layout of Pocono Raceway, the venue where the race was held.

The race was held at Pocono Raceway, which is a three-turn superspeedway located in Long Pond, Pennsylvania. The track hosts one annual NASCAR Cup Series races, as well as O'Reilly Auto Parts Series and Truck Series event. Until 2019, the track also hosted an IndyCar Series race.

Pocono Raceway is one of a very few NASCAR tracks not owned by either Speedway Motorsports, Inc. or International Speedway Corporation. It is operated by the Igdalsky siblings Brandon, Nicholas, and sister Ashley, and cousins Joseph IV and Chase Mattioli, all of whom are third-generation members of the family-owned Mattco Inc, started by Joseph II and Rose Mattioli.

Outside of the NASCAR races, the track is used throughout the year by Sports Car Club of America (SCCA) and motorcycle clubs as well as racing schools and an IndyCar race. The triangular oval also has three separate infield sections of racetrack – North Course, East Course and South Course. Each of these infield sections use a separate portion of the tri-oval to complete the track. During regular non-race weekends, multiple clubs can use the track by running on different infield sections. Also some of the infield sections can be run in either direction, or multiple infield sections can be put together – such as running the North Course and the South Course and using the tri-oval to connect the two.

=== Entry list ===
- (R) denotes rookie driver.

| # | Driver | Team | Make |
|---|---|---|---|
| 1 | Rick Mast | Precision Products Racing | Ford |
| 2 | Rusty Wallace | Penske Racing South | Pontiac |
| 02 | T. W. Taylor | Taylor Racing | Ford |
| 3 | Dale Earnhardt | Richard Childress Racing | Chevrolet |
| 4 | Ernie Irvan | Morgan–McClure Motorsports | Chevrolet |
| 5 | Ricky Rudd | Hendrick Motorsports | Chevrolet |
| 6 | Mark Martin | Roush Racing | Ford |
| 7 | Jimmy Hensley | AK Racing | Ford |
| 8 | Sterling Marlin | Stavola Brothers Racing | Ford |
| 11 | Bill Elliott | Junior Johnson & Associates | Ford |
| 12 | Jimmy Spencer | Bobby Allison Motorsports | Ford |
| 14 | Terry Labonte | Hagan Racing | Chevrolet |
| 15 | Geoff Bodine | Bud Moore Engineering | Ford |
| 16 | Wally Dallenbach Jr. | Roush Racing | Ford |
| 17 | Darrell Waltrip | Darrell Waltrip Motorsports | Chevrolet |
| 18 | Dale Jarrett | Joe Gibbs Racing | Chevrolet |
| 21 | Morgan Shepherd | Wood Brothers Racing | Ford |
| 22 | Bobby Labonte (R) | Bill Davis Racing | Ford |
| 24 | Jeff Gordon (R) | Hendrick Motorsports | Chevrolet |
| 25 | Ken Schrader | Hendrick Motorsports | Chevrolet |
| 26 | Brett Bodine | King Racing | Ford |
| 27 | Hut Stricklin | Junior Johnson & Associates | Ford |
| 29 | Kerry Teague | Linro Motorsports | Chevrolet |
| 30 | Michael Waltrip | Bahari Racing | Pontiac |
| 32 | Jimmy Horton | Active Motorsports | Chevrolet |
| 33 | Harry Gant | Leo Jackson Motorsports | Chevrolet |
| 38 | Bobby Hamilton | Akins Motorsports | Ford |
| 40 | Kenny Wallace (R) | SABCO Racing | Pontiac |
| 41 | Phil Parsons | Larry Hedrick Motorsports | Chevrolet |
| 42 | Kyle Petty | SABCO Racing | Pontiac |
| 44 | Rick Wilson | Petty Enterprises | Pontiac |
| 52 | Jimmy Means | Jimmy Means Racing | Ford |
| 55 | Ted Musgrave | RaDiUs Motorsports | Ford |
| 56 | Jerry Hill | Hill Motorsports | Chevrolet |
| 57 | Bob Schacht | Bob Schacht Motorsports | Oldsmobile |
| 62 | Clay Young | Jimmy Means Racing | Ford |
| 68 | Greg Sacks | TriStar Motorsports | Ford |
| 71 | Dave Marcis | Marcis Auto Racing | Chevrolet |
| 75 | Dick Trickle | Butch Mock Motorsports | Ford |
| 78 | Jay Hedgecock | Triad Motorsports | Ford |
| 85 | Ken Bouchard | Mansion Motorsports | Ford |
| 90 | Bobby Hillin Jr. | Donlavey Racing | Ford |
| 98 | Derrike Cope | Cale Yarborough Motorsports | Ford |
| 99 | John Krebs | Diamond Ridge Motorsports | Chevrolet |

== Qualifying ==
Qualifying was split into two rounds. The first round was held on Friday, July 16, at 3:00 PM EST. Each driver would have one lap to set a time. During the first round, the top 20 drivers in the round would be guaranteed a starting spot in the race. If a driver was not able to guarantee a spot in the first round, they had the option to scrub their time from the first round and try and run a faster lap time in a second round qualifying run, held on Saturday, July 17, at 10:30 AM EST. As with the first round, each driver would have one lap to set a time. For this specific race, positions 21–40 would be decided on time, and depending on who needed it, a select amount of positions were given to cars who had not otherwise qualified but were high enough in owner's points; up to two provisionals were given. If needed, a past champion who did not qualify on either time or provisionals could use a champion's provisional, adding one more spot to the field.

Ken Schrader, driving for Hendrick Motorsports, won the pole, setting a time of 55.237 and an average speed of 162.934 mph (262.217 km/h) in the first round.

Four drivers would fail to qualify.

=== Full qualifying results ===
| Pos. | # | Driver | Team | Make | Time | Speed |
|---|---|---|---|---|---|---|
| 1 | 25 | Ken Schrader | Hendrick Motorsports | Chevrolet | 55.237 | 162.934 |
| 2 | 11 | Bill Elliott | Junior Johnson & Associates | Ford | 55.338 | 162.637 |
| 3 | 5 | Ricky Rudd | Hendrick Motorsports | Chevrolet | 55.447 | 162.317 |
| 4 | 4 | Ernie Irvan | Morgan–McClure Motorsports | Chevrolet | 55.466 | 162.262 |
| 5 | 6 | Mark Martin | Roush Racing | Ford | 55.473 | 162.241 |
| 6 | 7 | Jimmy Hensley | AK Racing | Ford | 55.518 | 162.110 |
| 7 | 22 | Bobby Labonte (R) | Bill Davis Racing | Ford | 55.614 | 161.830 |
| 8 | 21 | Morgan Shepherd | Wood Brothers Racing | Ford | 55.831 | 161.201 |
| 9 | 98 | Derrike Cope | Cale Yarborough Motorsports | Ford | 55.868 | 161.094 |
| 10 | 26 | Brett Bodine | King Racing | Ford | 55.882 | 161.054 |
| 11 | 3 | Dale Earnhardt | Richard Childress Racing | Chevrolet | 55.925 | 160.930 |
| 12 | 27 | Hut Stricklin | Junior Johnson & Associates | Ford | 55.928 | 160.921 |
| 13 | 15 | Geoff Bodine | Bud Moore Engineering | Ford | 55.951 | 160.855 |
| 14 | 90 | Bobby Hillin Jr. | Donlavey Racing | Ford | 55.965 | 160.815 |
| 15 | 8 | Sterling Marlin | Stavola Brothers Racing | Ford | 56.011 | 160.683 |
| 16 | 30 | Michael Waltrip | Bahari Racing | Pontiac | 56.021 | 160.654 |
| 17 | 55 | Ted Musgrave | RaDiUs Motorsports | Ford | 56.079 | 160.488 |
| 18 | 2 | Rusty Wallace | Penske Racing South | Pontiac | 56.080 | 160.485 |
| 19 | 42 | Kyle Petty | SABCO Racing | Pontiac | 56.086 | 160.468 |
| 20 | 24 | Jeff Gordon (R) | Hendrick Motorsports | Chevrolet | 56.109 | 160.402 |
Failed to lock in Round 1
| 21 | 33 | Harry Gant | Leo Jackson Motorsports | Chevrolet | 56.145 | 160.299 |
| 22 | 16 | Wally Dallenbach Jr. | Roush Racing | Ford | 56.197 | 160.151 |
| 23 | 18 | Dale Jarrett | Joe Gibbs Racing | Chevrolet | 56.207 | 160.122 |
| 24 | 12 | Jimmy Spencer | Bobby Allison Motorsports | Ford | 56.242 | 160.023 |
| 25 | 44 | Rick Wilson | Petty Enterprises | Pontiac | 56.306 | 159.841 |
| 26 | 68 | Greg Sacks | TriStar Motorsports | Ford | 56.414 | 159.535 |
| 27 | 17 | Darrell Waltrip | Darrell Waltrip Motorsports | Chevrolet | 56.443 | 159.453 |
| 28 | 41 | Phil Parsons | Larry Hedrick Motorsports | Chevrolet | 56.450 | 159.433 |
| 29 | 1 | Rick Mast | Precision Products Racing | Ford | 56.488 | 159.326 |
| 30 | 40 | Kenny Wallace (R) | SABCO Racing | Pontiac | 56.548 | 159.157 |
| 31 | 75 | Dick Trickle | Butch Mock Motorsports | Ford | 56.621 | 158.952 |
| 32 | 14 | Terry Labonte | Hagan Racing | Chevrolet | 56.658 | 158.848 |
| 33 | 02 | T. W. Taylor | Taylor Racing | Ford | 56.875 | 158.242 |
| 34 | 38 | Bobby Hamilton | Akins Motorsports | Ford | 57.046 | 157.767 |
| 35 | 32 | Jimmy Horton | Active Motorsports | Chevrolet | 57.140 | 157.508 |
| 36 | 71 | Dave Marcis | Marcis Auto Racing | Chevrolet | 57.367 | 156.885 |
| 37 | 85 | Ken Bouchard | Mansion Motorsports | Ford | 57.626 | 156.180 |
| 38 | 29 | Kerry Teague | Linro Motorsports | Chevrolet | 57.647 | 156.123 |
| 39 | 62 | Clay Young | Jimmy Means Racing | Ford | 57.734 | 155.887 |
| 40 | 99 | John Krebs | Diamond Ridge Motorsports | Chevrolet | 57.864 | 155.537 |
Failed to qualify
| 41 | 52 | Jimmy Means | Jimmy Means Racing | Ford | -* | -* |
| 42 | 78 | Jay Hedgecock | Triad Motorsports | Ford | -* | -* |
| 43 | 56 | Jerry Hill | Hill Motorsports | Chevrolet | -* | -* |
| 44 | 57 | Bob Schacht | Bob Schacht Motorsports | Oldsmobile | -* | -* |
Official first round qualifying results
Official starting lineup

== Race results ==
| Fin | St | # | Driver | Team | Make | Laps | Led | Status | Pts | Winnings |
|---|---|---|---|---|---|---|---|---|---|---|
| 1 | 11 | 3 | Dale Earnhardt | Richard Childress Racing | Chevrolet | 200 | 71 | running | 185 | $66,795 |
| 2 | 18 | 2 | Rusty Wallace | Penske Racing South | Pontiac | 200 | 6 | running | 175 | $35,145 |
| 3 | 2 | 11 | Bill Elliott | Junior Johnson & Associates | Ford | 200 | 0 | running | 165 | $39,720 |
| 4 | 8 | 21 | Morgan Shepherd | Wood Brothers Racing | Ford | 200 | 0 | running | 160 | $26,345 |
| 5 | 10 | 26 | Brett Bodine | King Racing | Ford | 200 | 14 | running | 160 | $25,940 |
| 6 | 1 | 25 | Ken Schrader | Hendrick Motorsports | Chevrolet | 200 | 6 | running | 155 | $28,040 |
| 7 | 15 | 8 | Sterling Marlin | Stavola Brothers Racing | Ford | 200 | 0 | running | 146 | $17,765 |
| 8 | 23 | 18 | Dale Jarrett | Joe Gibbs Racing | Chevrolet | 200 | 47 | running | 147 | $19,915 |
| 9 | 21 | 33 | Harry Gant | Leo Jackson Motorsports | Chevrolet | 200 | 12 | running | 143 | $19,665 |
| 10 | 27 | 17 | Darrell Waltrip | Darrell Waltrip Motorsports | Chevrolet | 200 | 1 | running | 139 | $22,815 |
| 11 | 3 | 5 | Ricky Rudd | Hendrick Motorsports | Chevrolet | 200 | 0 | running | 130 | $15,615 |
| 12 | 13 | 15 | Geoff Bodine | Bud Moore Engineering | Ford | 200 | 3 | running | 132 | $17,565 |
| 13 | 5 | 6 | Mark Martin | Roush Racing | Ford | 200 | 0 | running | 124 | $17,365 |
| 14 | 16 | 30 | Michael Waltrip | Bahari Racing | Pontiac | 200 | 5 | running | 126 | $14,865 |
| 15 | 7 | 22 | Bobby Labonte (R) | Bill Davis Racing | Ford | 200 | 1 | running | 123 | $12,915 |
| 16 | 32 | 14 | Terry Labonte | Hagan Racing | Chevrolet | 199 | 0 | running | 115 | $14,065 |
| 17 | 22 | 16 | Wally Dallenbach Jr. | Roush Racing | Ford | 199 | 0 | running | 112 | $13,765 |
| 18 | 28 | 41 | Phil Parsons | Larry Hedrick Motorsports | Chevrolet | 199 | 0 | running | 109 | $10,565 |
| 19 | 34 | 38 | Bobby Hamilton | Akins Motorsports | Ford | 199 | 0 | running | 106 | $8,515 |
| 20 | 14 | 90 | Bobby Hillin Jr. | Donlavey Racing | Ford | 199 | 0 | running | 103 | $8,940 |
| 21 | 25 | 44 | Rick Wilson | Petty Enterprises | Pontiac | 198 | 0 | running | 100 | $10,015 |
| 22 | 36 | 71 | Dave Marcis | Marcis Auto Racing | Chevrolet | 197 | 0 | running | 97 | $8,065 |
| 23 | 30 | 40 | Kenny Wallace (R) | SABCO Racing | Pontiac | 197 | 0 | running | 94 | $10,215 |
| 24 | 24 | 12 | Jimmy Spencer | Bobby Allison Motorsports | Ford | 195 | 0 | running | 91 | $12,565 |
| 25 | 37 | 85 | Ken Bouchard | Mansion Motorsports | Ford | 193 | 0 | running | 88 | $7,865 |
| 26 | 35 | 32 | Jimmy Horton | Active Motorsports | Chevrolet | 183 | 0 | crash | 85 | $7,815 |
| 27 | 19 | 42 | Kyle Petty | SABCO Racing | Pontiac | 174 | 26 | running | 87 | $16,765 |
| 28 | 12 | 27 | Hut Stricklin | Junior Johnson & Associates | Ford | 174 | 0 | running | 79 | $12,315 |
| 29 | 9 | 98 | Derrike Cope | Cale Yarborough Motorsports | Ford | 173 | 0 | rear end | 76 | $12,240 |
| 30 | 31 | 75 | Dick Trickle | Butch Mock Motorsports | Ford | 171 | 0 | running | 73 | $7,615 |
| 31 | 4 | 4 | Ernie Irvan | Morgan–McClure Motorsports | Chevrolet | 157 | 8 | engine | 75 | $17,165 |
| 32 | 26 | 68 | Greg Sacks | TriStar Motorsports | Ford | 103 | 0 | engine | 67 | $7,515 |
| 33 | 17 | 55 | Ted Musgrave | RaDiUs Motorsports | Ford | 101 | 0 | engine | 64 | $11,965 |
| 34 | 38 | 29 | Kerry Teague | Linro Motorsports | Chevrolet | 88 | 0 | crash | 61 | $7,340 |
| 35 | 40 | 99 | John Krebs | Diamond Ridge Motorsports | Chevrolet | 86 | 0 | crash | 58 | $7,265 |
| 36 | 29 | 1 | Rick Mast | Precision Products Racing | Ford | 72 | 0 | engine | 55 | $11,715 |
| 37 | 20 | 24 | Jeff Gordon (R) | Hendrick Motorsports | Chevrolet | 49 | 0 | engine | 52 | $9,615 |
| 38 | 39 | 62 | Clay Young | Jimmy Means Racing | Ford | 46 | 0 | brakes | 49 | $7,075 |
| 39 | 6 | 7 | Jimmy Hensley | AK Racing | Ford | 42 | 0 | engine | 46 | $16,440 |
| 40 | 33 | 02 | T. W. Taylor | Taylor Racing | Ford | 26 | 0 | clutch | 43 | $6,965 |
Official race results

== Standings after the race ==
Drivers' Championship standings

| | Pos | Driver | Points |
|---|---|---|---|
| | 1 | Dale Earnhardt | 2,612 |
| | 2 | Dale Jarrett | 2,403 (−209) |
| | 3 | Rusty Wallace | 2,352 (−260) |
| | 4 | Morgan Shepherd | 2,272 (−340) |
| 5 | 5 | Ken Schrader | 2,181 (−431) |
| | 6 | Kyle Petty | 2,175 (−437) |
| 1 | 7 | Mark Martin | 2,172 (−440) |
| 1 | 8 | Jeff Gordon | 2,108 (−504) |
| 5 | 9 | Davey Allison | 2,104 (−508) |
| 1 | 10 | Geoff Bodine | 2,099 (−513) |
Official driver's standings

- Note: Only the first 10 positions are included for the driver standings.

| Previous race: 1993 Slick 50 300 | NASCAR Winston Cup Series; 1993 season | Next race: 1993 DieHard 500 |
