= 1993 Budweiser 500 =

12th race of the 1993 NASCAR Winston Cup Series

Race details
- Race 12 of 30 in the 1993 NASCAR Winston Cup Series
- The 1993 Budweiser 500 program cover, featuring Bill Elliott and Dale Earnhardt.
- Date: June 6, 1993
- Official name: 25th Annual Budweiser 500
- Location: Dover, Delaware, Dover International Speedway
- Course: Permanent racing facility
- Course length: 1 miles (1.6 km)
- Distance: 500 laps, 500 mi (804.672 km)
- Scheduled distance: 500 laps, 500 mi (804.672 km)
- Average speed: 105.6 miles per hour (169.9 km/h)
- Attendance: 86,000

Pole position
Driver	Ernie Irvan	Morgan–McClure Motorsports
- Time: 23.756

Most laps led
Driver	Dale Earnhardt	Richard Childress Racing
- Laps: 226

Winner
No. 3	Dale Earnhardt	Richard Childress Racing

Television in the United States
- Network: TNN
- Announcers: Mike Joy, Buddy Baker, Neil Bonnett

Radio in the United States
- Radio: Motor Racing Network

The 1993 Budweiser 500 was the 12th stock car race of the 1993 NASCAR Winston Cup Series season and the 25th iteration of the event. The race was held on Sunday, June 6, 1993, in Dover, Delaware at Dover International Speedway, a 1 mile (1.6 km) permanent oval-shaped racetrack. The race took the scheduled 500 laps to complete. At race's end, Richard Childress Racing driver Dale Earnhardt would manage to defend a late-race charge by Joe Gibbs Racing driver Dale Jarrett to take his 56th career NASCAR Winston Cup Series victory and his third victory of the season. To fill out the top three, the aforementioned Jarrett and Robert Yates Racing driver Davey Allison would finish second and third, respectively.

== Background ==
The layout of Dover Downs International Speedway, the venue where the race was held.

Dover Downs International Speedway is an oval race track in Dover, Delaware, United States that has held at least two NASCAR races since it opened in 1969. In addition to NASCAR, the track also hosted USAC and the NTT IndyCar Series. The track features one layout, a 1 mile (1.6 km) concrete oval, with 24° banking in the turns and 9° banking on the straights. The speedway is owned and operated by Dover Motorsports.

The track, nicknamed "The Monster Mile", was built in 1969 by Melvin Joseph of Melvin L. Joseph Construction Company, Inc., with an asphalt surface, but was replaced with concrete in 1995. Six years later in 2001, the track's capacity moved to 135,000 seats, making the track have the largest capacity of sports venue in the mid-Atlantic. In 2002, the name changed to Dover International Speedway from Dover Downs International Speedway after Dover Downs Gaming and Entertainment split, making Dover Motorsports. From 2007 to 2009, the speedway worked on an improvement project called "The Monster Makeover", which expanded facilities at the track and beautified the track. After the 2014 season, the track's capacity was reduced to 95,500 seats.

=== Entry list ===
- (R) denotes rookie driver.

#	Driver	Team	Make
1	Rick Mast	Precision Products Racing	Ford
2	Rusty Wallace	Penske Racing South	Pontiac
3	Dale Earnhardt	Richard Childress Racing	Chevrolet
4	Ernie Irvan	Morgan–McClure Motorsports	Chevrolet
5	Ricky Rudd	Hendrick Motorsports	Chevrolet
6	Mark Martin	Roush Racing	Ford
7	Jimmy Hensley	AK Racing	Ford
8	Sterling Marlin	Stavola Brothers Racing	Ford
9	P. J. Jones (R)	Melling Racing	Ford
11	Bill Elliott	Junior Johnson & Associates	Ford
12	Jimmy Spencer	Bobby Allison Motorsports	Ford
14	Terry Labonte	Hagan Racing	Chevrolet
15	Geoff Bodine	Bud Moore Engineering	Ford
16	Wally Dallenbach Jr.	Roush Racing	Ford
17	Darrell Waltrip	Darrell Waltrip Motorsports	Chevrolet
18	Dale Jarrett	Joe Gibbs Racing	Chevrolet
21	Morgan Shepherd	Wood Brothers Racing	Ford
22	Bobby Labonte (R)	Bill Davis Racing	Ford
24	Jeff Gordon (R)	Hendrick Motorsports	Chevrolet
25	Ken Schrader	Hendrick Motorsports	Chevrolet
26	Brett Bodine	King Racing	Ford
27	Hut Stricklin	Junior Johnson & Associates	Ford
28	Davey Allison	Robert Yates Racing	Ford
30	Michael Waltrip	Bahari Racing	Pontiac
33	Harry Gant	Leo Jackson Motorsports	Chevrolet
38	Bobby Hamilton	Akins Motorsports	Ford
40	Kenny Wallace (R)	SABCO Racing	Pontiac
41	Phil Parsons	Larry Hedrick Motorsports	Chevrolet
42	Kyle Petty	SABCO Racing	Pontiac
44	Rick Wilson	Petty Enterprises	Pontiac
52	Jimmy Means	Jimmy Means Racing	Ford
55	Ted Musgrave	RaDiUs Motorsports	Ford
56	Jerry Hill	Hill Motorsports	Chevrolet
68	Greg Sacks	TriStar Motorsports	Ford
71	Dave Marcis	Marcis Auto Racing	Chevrolet
75	Dick Trickle	Butch Mock Motorsports	Ford
80	Jimmy Horton	Hover Motorsports	Ford
83	Lake Speed	Speed Racing	Ford
85	Ken Bouchard	Mansion Motorsports	Ford
90	Bobby Hillin Jr.	Donlavey Racing	Ford
98	Derrike Cope	Cale Yarborough Motorsports	Ford

== Qualifying ==
Qualifying was split into two rounds. The first round was held on Friday, June 4, at 3:00 PM EST. Each driver would have one lap to set a time. During the first round, the top 20 drivers in the round would be guaranteed a starting spot in the race. If a driver was not able to guarantee a spot in the first round, they had the option to scrub their time from the first round and try and run a faster lap time in a second round qualifying run, held on Saturday, June 5, at 11:30 AM EST. As with the first round, each driver would have one lap to set a time. For this specific race, positions 21-34 would be decided on time, and depending on who needed it, a select amount of positions were given to cars who had not otherwise qualified but were high enough in owner's points; which was usually two. If needed, a past champion who did not qualify on either time or provisionals could use a champion's provisional, adding one more spot to the field.

Ernie Irvan, driving for Morgan–McClure Motorsports, won the pole, setting a time of 23.756 and an average speed of 151.541 mph (243.882 km/h) in the first round.

Three drivers would fail to qualify.

=== Full qualifying results ===
Pos.	#	Driver	Team	Make	Time	Speed
1	4	Ernie Irvan	Morgan–McClure Motorsports	Chevrolet	23.756	151.541
2	26	Brett Bodine	King Racing	Ford	23.937	150.395
3	28	Davey Allison	Robert Yates Racing	Ford	23.965	150.219
4	2	Rusty Wallace	Penske Racing South	Pontiac	23.971	150.181
5	44	Rick Wilson	Petty Enterprises	Pontiac	23.982	150.113
6	98	Derrike Cope	Cale Yarborough Motorsports	Ford	23.990	150.063
7	42	Kyle Petty	SABCO Racing	Pontiac	23.999	150.006
8	3	Dale Earnhardt	Richard Childress Racing	Chevrolet	24.024	149.850
9	6	Mark Martin	Roush Racing	Ford	24.078	149.514
10	15	Geoff Bodine	Bud Moore Engineering	Ford	24.079	149.508
11	7	Jimmy Hensley	AK Racing	Ford	24.104	149.353
12	25	Ken Schrader	Hendrick Motorsports	Chevrolet	24.112	149.303
13	33	Harry Gant	Leo Jackson Motorsports	Chevrolet	24.139	149.136
14	41	Phil Parsons	Larry Hedrick Motorsports	Chevrolet	24.174	148.920
15	5	Ricky Rudd	Hendrick Motorsports	Chevrolet	24.181	148.877
16	21	Morgan Shepherd	Wood Brothers Racing	Ford	24.207	148.717
17	83	Lake Speed	Speed Racing	Ford	24.210	148.699
18	71	Dave Marcis	Marcis Auto Racing	Chevrolet	24.215	148.668
19	22	Bobby Labonte (R)	Bill Davis Racing	Ford	24.216	148.662
20	12	Jimmy Spencer	Bobby Allison Motorsports	Ford	24.227	148.595
Failed to lock in Round 1
21	24	Jeff Gordon (R)	Hendrick Motorsports	Chevrolet	23.941	150.370
22	8	Sterling Marlin	Stavola Brothers Racing	Ford	24.062	149.613
23	1	Rick Mast	Precision Products Racing	Ford	24.081	149.495
24	11	Bill Elliott	Junior Johnson & Associates	Ford	24.162	148.994
25	55	Ted Musgrave	RaDiUs Motorsports	Ford	24.179	148.890
26	14	Terry Labonte	Hagan Racing	Chevrolet	24.246	148.478
27	68	Greg Sacks	TriStar Motorsports	Ford	24.270	148.331
28	17	Darrell Waltrip	Darrell Waltrip Motorsports	Chevrolet	24.279	148.276
29	18	Dale Jarrett	Joe Gibbs Racing	Chevrolet	24.322	148.014
30	90	Bobby Hillin Jr.	Donlavey Racing	Ford	24.341	147.899
31	30	Michael Waltrip	Bahari Racing	Pontiac	24.425	147.390
32	16	Wally Dallenbach Jr.	Roush Racing	Ford	24.471	147.113
33	38	Bobby Hamilton	Akins Motorsports	Ford	24.525	146.789
34	75	Dick Trickle	Butch Mock Motorsports	Ford	24.563	146.562
35	40	Kenny Wallace (R)	SABCO Racing	Pontiac	24.809	145.109
36	9	P. J. Jones (R)	Melling Racing	Ford	24.822	145.033
Provisionals
37	27	Hut Stricklin	Junior Johnson & Associates	Ford	27.548	130.681
38	52	Jimmy Means	Jimmy Means Racing	Ford	25.238	142.642
Failed to qualify
39	80	Jimmy Horton	Hover Motorsports	Ford	24.842	144.916
40	85	Ken Bouchard	Mansion Motorsports	Ford	24.943	144.329
41	56	Jerry Hill	Hill Motorsports	Chevrolet	26.612	135.277
Official first round qualifying results
Official starting lineup

== Race results ==
Fin	St	#	Driver	Team	Make	Laps	Led	Status	Pts	Winnings
1	8	3	Dale Earnhardt	Richard Childress Racing	Chevrolet	500	226	running	185	$68,030
2	29	18	Dale Jarrett	Joe Gibbs Racing	Chevrolet	500	0	running	170	$42,435
3	3	28	Davey Allison	Robert Yates Racing	Ford	500	69	running	170	$38,240
4	9	6	Mark Martin	Roush Racing	Ford	500	25	running	165	$28,100
5	12	25	Ken Schrader	Hendrick Motorsports	Chevrolet	500	2	running	160	$25,330
6	23	1	Rick Mast	Precision Products Racing	Ford	500	3	running	155	$20,700
7	13	33	Harry Gant	Leo Jackson Motorsports	Chevrolet	499	0	running	146	$21,650
8	20	12	Jimmy Spencer	Bobby Allison Motorsports	Ford	499	0	running	142	$18,050
9	16	21	Morgan Shepherd	Wood Brothers Racing	Ford	498	0	running	138	$17,300
10	33	38	Bobby Hamilton	Akins Motorsports	Ford	495	0	running	134	$13,200
11	5	44	Rick Wilson	Petty Enterprises	Pontiac	495	0	running	130	$13,050
12	32	16	Wally Dallenbach Jr.	Roush Racing	Ford	491	0	running	127	$15,450
13	35	40	Kenny Wallace (R)	SABCO Racing	Pontiac	490	0	running	124	$12,950
14	25	55	Ted Musgrave	RaDiUs Motorsports	Ford	488	0	running	121	$14,350
15	37	27	Hut Stricklin	Junior Johnson & Associates	Ford	486	0	running	118	$14,200
16	2	26	Brett Bodine	King Racing	Ford	459	51	running	120	$14,150
17	24	11	Bill Elliott	Junior Johnson & Associates	Ford	448	0	running	112	$18,950
18	21	24	Jeff Gordon (R)	Hendrick Motorsports	Chevrolet	440	0	running	109	$11,485
19	19	22	Bobby Labonte (R)	Bill Davis Racing	Ford	439	9	running	111	$10,300
20	26	14	Terry Labonte	Hagan Racing	Chevrolet	429	0	running	103	$13,550
21	4	2	Rusty Wallace	Penske Racing South	Pontiac	425	82	crash	105	$17,450
22	11	7	Jimmy Hensley	AK Racing	Ford	422	0	crash	97	$17,800
23	10	15	Geoff Bodine	Bud Moore Engineering	Ford	415	0	crash	94	$16,350
24	28	17	Darrell Waltrip	Darrell Waltrip Motorsports	Chevrolet	414	0	crash	91	$17,950
25	30	90	Bobby Hillin Jr.	Donlavey Racing	Ford	402	0	running	88	$8,100
26	38	52	Jimmy Means	Jimmy Means Racing	Ford	372	0	engine	85	$8,050
27	31	30	Michael Waltrip	Bahari Racing	Pontiac	370	7	engine	87	$12,600
28	34	75	Dick Trickle	Butch Mock Motorsports	Ford	319	0	engine	79	$7,950
29	7	42	Kyle Petty	SABCO Racing	Pontiac	243	5	crash	81	$15,900
30	17	83	Lake Speed	Speed Racing	Ford	238	0	engine	73	$7,850
31	6	98	Derrike Cope	Cale Yarborough Motorsports	Ford	206	0	crash	70	$12,375
32	1	4	Ernie Irvan	Morgan–McClure Motorsports	Chevrolet	153	13	engine	72	$22,840
33	22	8	Sterling Marlin	Stavola Brothers Racing	Ford	145	0	crash	64	$12,240
34	36	9	P. J. Jones (R)	Melling Racing	Ford	130	0	crash	61	$7,640
35	15	5	Ricky Rudd	Hendrick Motorsports	Chevrolet	121	0	crash	58	$12,115
36	18	71	Dave Marcis	Marcis Auto Racing	Chevrolet	110	8	crash	60	$7,565
37	14	41	Phil Parsons	Larry Hedrick Motorsports	Chevrolet	104	0	crash	52	$9,065
38	27	68	Greg Sacks	TriStar Motorsports	Ford	18	0	crash	49	$7,565
Official race results

== Standings after the race ==
Drivers' Championship standings

	Pos	Driver	Points
	1	Dale Earnhardt	1,896
	2	Rusty Wallace	1,687 (-209)
	3	Dale Jarrett	1,673 (-223)
2	4	Davey Allison	1,651 (–245)
1	5	Geoff Bodine	1,585 (–311)
2	6	Morgan Shepherd	1,568 (–328)
2	7	Kyle Petty	1,565 (–331)
2	8	Ken Schrader	1,517 (–379)
2	9	Ernie Irvan	1,507 (–389)
1	10	Jeff Gordon	1,491 (–405)
Official driver's standings

- Note: Only the first 10 positions are included for the driver standings.

Previous race: 1993 Coca-Cola 600	NASCAR Winston Cup Series; 1993 season	Next race: 1993 Champion Spark Plug 500
