= 1993 Slick 50 300 =

16th race of the 1993 NASCAR Winston Cup Series

Race details
- Race 16 of 30 in the 1993 NASCAR Winston Cup Series
- The 1993 Slick 50 300 program cover, featuring Bill Elliott. Artwork by NASCAR artist Sam Bass.
- Date: July 11, 1993
- Official name: Inaugural Annual Slick 50 300
- Location: Loudon, New Hampshire, New Hampshire International Speedway
- Course: Permanent racing facility
- Course length: 1.058 miles (1.704 km)
- Distance: 300 laps, 317.4 mi (510.805 km)
- Scheduled distance: 300 laps, 317.4 mi (510.805 km)
- Average speed: 105.947 miles per hour (170.505 km/h)
- Attendance: 66,000

Pole position
Driver	Mark Martin	Roush Racing
- Time: 30.021

Most laps led
Driver	Sterling Marlin	Stavola Brothers Racing
- Laps: 123

Winner
No. 2	Rusty Wallace	Penske Racing South

Television in the United States
- Network: TNN
- Announcers: Mike Joy, Buddy Baker, Neil Bonnett

Radio in the United States
- Radio: Motor Racing Network

The 1993 Slick 50 300 was the 16th stock car race of the 1993 NASCAR Winston Cup Series season and the inaugural iteration of the event. The race was held on Sunday, July 11, 1993, in Loudon, New Hampshire, at New Hampshire International Speedway, a 1.058-mile (1.703 km) permanent, oval-shaped, low-banked racetrack. The race took the scheduled 300 laps to complete. With the help of a fast final pit stop, Penske Racing South driver Rusty Wallace would manage to pull away on the final restart with 27 to go to take his 26th career NASCAR Winston Cup Series victory and his fifth victory of the season. Filling out the top three were, Roush Racing driver Mark Martin and Robert Yates Racing driver Davey Allison finishing second and third, respectively.

Unbeknownst to all at the time, this would mark Allison's final race, as the following day he would be critically injured in a helicopter crash at Talladega Speedway and ultimately died early in the morning of July 13, 1993.

== Background ==
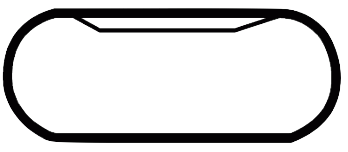
The layout of New Hampshire International Speedway, the venue where the race was held.

New Hampshire International Speedway is a 1.058-mile (1.703 km) oval speedway located in Loudon, New Hampshire which has hosted NASCAR racing annually since the early 1990s, as well as an IndyCar weekend and the oldest motorcycle race in North America, the Loudon Classic. Nicknamed "The Magic Mile", the speedway is often converted into a 1.6-mile (2.6 km) road course, which includes much of the oval. The track was originally the site of Bryar Motorsports Park before being purchased and redeveloped by Bob Bahre. The track is currently one of eight major NASCAR tracks owned and operated by Speedway Motorsports.

=== Entry list ===
- (R) denotes rookie driver.

#	Driver	Team	Make
0	Jeff Burton	FILMAR Racing	Ford
1	Rick Mast	Precision Products Racing	Ford
2	Rusty Wallace	Penske Racing South	Pontiac
3	Dale Earnhardt	Richard Childress Racing	Chevrolet
4	Ernie Irvan	Morgan–McClure Motorsports	Chevrolet
5	Ricky Rudd	Hendrick Motorsports	Chevrolet
6	Mark Martin	Roush Racing	Ford
7	Jimmy Hensley	AK Racing	Ford
8	Sterling Marlin	Stavola Brothers Racing	Ford
11	Bill Elliott	Junior Johnson & Associates	Ford
12	Jimmy Spencer	Bobby Allison Motorsports	Ford
14	Terry Labonte	Hagan Racing	Chevrolet
15	Geoff Bodine	Bud Moore Engineering	Ford
16	Wally Dallenbach Jr.	Roush Racing	Ford
17	Darrell Waltrip	Darrell Waltrip Motorsports	Chevrolet
18	Dale Jarrett	Joe Gibbs Racing	Chevrolet
21	Morgan Shepherd	Wood Brothers Racing	Ford
22	Bobby Labonte (R)	Bill Davis Racing	Ford
24	Jeff Gordon (R)	Hendrick Motorsports	Chevrolet
25	Ken Schrader	Hendrick Motorsports	Chevrolet
26	Brett Bodine	King Racing	Ford
27	Hut Stricklin	Junior Johnson & Associates	Ford
28	Davey Allison	Robert Yates Racing	Ford
30	Michael Waltrip	Bahari Racing	Pontiac
33	Harry Gant	Leo Jackson Motorsports	Chevrolet
40	Kenny Wallace (R)	SABCO Racing	Pontiac
41	Phil Parsons	Larry Hedrick Motorsports	Chevrolet
42	Kyle Petty	SABCO Racing	Pontiac
44	Rick Wilson	Petty Enterprises	Pontiac
52	Jimmy Means	Jimmy Means Racing	Ford
55	Ted Musgrave	RaDiUs Motorsports	Ford
62	Clay Young	Jimmy Means Racing	Ford
65	Jerry O'Neil	Aroneck Racing	Chevrolet
68	Greg Sacks	TriStar Motorsports	Ford
71	Dave Marcis	Marcis Auto Racing	Chevrolet
75	Dick Trickle	Butch Mock Motorsports	Ford
83	Lake Speed	Speed Racing	Ford
85	Ken Bouchard	Mansion Motorsports	Ford
87	Joe Nemechek	NEMCO Motorsports	Chevrolet
90	Bobby Hillin Jr.	Donlavey Racing	Ford
98	Derrike Cope	Cale Yarborough Motorsports	Ford

== Qualifying ==
Qualifying was split into two rounds. The first round was held on Friday, July 9, at 3:30 PM EST. Each driver would have one lap to set a time. During the first round, the top 20 drivers in the round would be guaranteed a starting spot in the race. If a driver was not able to guarantee a spot in the first round, they had the option to scrub their time from the first round and try and run a faster lap time in a second round qualifying run, held on Saturday, July 10, at 11:00 AM EST. As with the first round, each driver would have one lap to set a time. For this specific race, positions 21-40 would be decided on time, and depending on who needed it, a select amount of positions were given to cars who had not otherwise qualified but were high enough in owner's points; up to two were given. If needed, a past champion who did not qualify on either time or provisionals could use a champion's provisional, adding one more spot to the field.

Mark Martin, driving for Roush Racing, won the pole, setting a time of 30.021 and an average speed of 126.871 mph (204.179 km/h) in the first round.

Clay Young was the only driver to fail to qualify.

=== Full qualifying results ===
Pos.	#	Driver	Team	Make	Time	Speed
1	6	Mark Martin	Roush Racing	Ford	30.021	126.871
2	8	Sterling Marlin	Stavola Brothers Racing	Ford	30.053	126.736
3	24	Jeff Gordon (R)	Hendrick Motorsports	Chevrolet	30.067	126.677
4	25	Ken Schrader	Hendrick Motorsports	Chevrolet	30.089	126.584
5	14	Terry Labonte	Hagan Racing	Chevrolet	30.210	126.077
6	0	Jeff Burton	FILMAR Racing	Ford	30.214	126.061
7	28	Davey Allison	Robert Yates Racing	Ford	30.223	126.023
8	4	Ernie Irvan	Morgan–McClure Motorsports	Chevrolet	30.232	125.986
9	18	Dale Jarrett	Joe Gibbs Racing	Chevrolet	30.234	125.977
10	5	Ricky Rudd	Hendrick Motorsports	Chevrolet	30.263	125.857
11	12	Jimmy Spencer	Bobby Allison Motorsports	Ford	30.291	125.740
12	30	Michael Waltrip	Bahari Racing	Pontiac	30.292	125.736
13	7	Jimmy Hensley	AK Racing	Ford	30.311	125.657
14	21	Morgan Shepherd	Wood Brothers Racing	Ford	30.350	125.496
15	87	Joe Nemechek	NEMCO Motorsports	Chevrolet	30.360	125.455
16	44	Rick Wilson	Petty Enterprises	Pontiac	30.371	125.409
17	22	Bobby Labonte (R)	Bill Davis Racing	Ford	30.379	125.376
18	11	Bill Elliott	Junior Johnson & Associates	Ford	30.407	125.261
19	42	Kyle Petty	SABCO Racing	Pontiac	30.408	125.257
20	55	Ted Musgrave	RaDiUs Motorsports	Ford	30.408	125.257
Failed to lock in Round 1
21	83	Lake Speed	Speed Racing	Ford	30.414	125.232
22	17	Darrell Waltrip	Darrell Waltrip Motorsports	Chevrolet	30.419	125.211
23	26	Brett Bodine	King Racing	Ford	30.428	125.174
24	3	Dale Earnhardt	Richard Childress Racing	Chevrolet	30.430	125.166
25	40	Kenny Wallace (R)	SABCO Racing	Pontiac	30.503	124.866
26	1	Rick Mast	Precision Products Racing	Ford	30.559	124.638
27	15	Geoff Bodine	Bud Moore Engineering	Ford	30.572	124.585
28	90	Bobby Hillin Jr.	Donlavey Racing	Ford	30.623	124.377
29	33	Harry Gant	Leo Jackson Motorsports	Chevrolet	30.678	124.154
30	68	Greg Sacks	TriStar Motorsports	Ford	30.701	124.061
31	16	Wally Dallenbach Jr.	Roush Racing	Ford	30.734	123.928
32	27	Hut Stricklin	Junior Johnson & Associates	Ford	30.763	123.811
33	2	Rusty Wallace	Penske Racing South	Pontiac	30.811	123.618
34	71	Dave Marcis	Marcis Auto Racing	Chevrolet	30.881	123.338
35	85	Ken Bouchard	Mansion Motorsports	Ford	30.899	123.266
36	65	Jerry O'Neil	O'Neil Racing	Chevrolet	30.987	122.916
37	75	Dick Trickle	Butch Mock Motorsports	Ford	31.044	122.690
38	98	Derrike Cope	Cale Yarborough Motorsports	Ford	31.151	122.269
39	41	Phil Parsons	Larry Hedrick Motorsports	Chevrolet	31.179	122.159
40	52	Jimmy Means	Jimmy Means Racing	Ford	31.231	121.956
Failed to qualify
41	62	Clay Young	Jimmy Means Racing	Ford	31.959	119.178
Official first round qualifying results
Official starting lineup

== Race results ==
Fin	St	#	Driver	Team	Make	Laps	Led	Status	Pts	Winnings
1	33	2	Rusty Wallace	Penske Racing South	Pontiac	300	106	running	180	$77,500
2	1	6	Mark Martin	Roush Racing	Ford	300	29	running	175	$74,800
3	7	28	Davey Allison	Robert Yates Racing	Ford	300	38	running	170	$44,725
4	9	18	Dale Jarrett	Joe Gibbs Racing	Chevrolet	300	1	running	165	$33,850
5	10	5	Ricky Rudd	Hendrick Motorsports	Chevrolet	300	0	running	155	$25,375
6	2	8	Sterling Marlin	Stavola Brothers Racing	Ford	300	123	running	160	$25,550
7	3	24	Jeff Gordon (R)	Hendrick Motorsports	Chevrolet	300	3	running	151	$19,150
8	19	42	Kyle Petty	SABCO Racing	Pontiac	299	0	running	142	$20,700
9	18	11	Bill Elliott	Junior Johnson & Associates	Ford	299	0	running	138	$22,800
10	17	22	Bobby Labonte (R)	Bill Davis Racing	Ford	299	0	running	134	$16,350
11	13	7	Jimmy Hensley	AK Racing	Ford	299	0	running	130	$21,800
12	27	15	Geoff Bodine	Bud Moore Engineering	Ford	299	0	running	127	$20,300
13	23	26	Brett Bodine	King Racing	Ford	299	0	running	124	$18,100
14	14	21	Morgan Shepherd	Wood Brothers Racing	Ford	298	0	running	121	$17,900
15	8	4	Ernie Irvan	Morgan–McClure Motorsports	Chevrolet	298	0	running	118	$22,050
16	26	1	Rick Mast	Precision Products Racing	Ford	298	0	running	115	$17,350
17	29	33	Harry Gant	Leo Jackson Motorsports	Chevrolet	298	0	running	112	$20,550
18	11	12	Jimmy Spencer	Bobby Allison Motorsports	Ford	298	0	running	109	$16,950
19	22	17	Darrell Waltrip	Darrell Waltrip Motorsports	Chevrolet	298	0	running	106	$21,150
20	28	90	Bobby Hillin Jr.	Donlavey Racing	Ford	297	0	running	103	$11,800
21	25	40	Kenny Wallace (R)	SABCO Racing	Pontiac	297	0	running	100	$13,150
22	38	98	Derrike Cope	Cale Yarborough Motorsports	Ford	297	0	running	97	$16,050
23	12	30	Michael Waltrip	Bahari Racing	Pontiac	297	0	running	94	$15,850
24	20	55	Ted Musgrave	RaDiUs Motorsports	Ford	297	0	running	91	$15,700
25	32	27	Hut Stricklin	Junior Johnson & Associates	Ford	296	0	running	88	$15,500
26	24	3	Dale Earnhardt	Richard Childress Racing	Chevrolet	296	0	running	85	$15,300
27	31	16	Wally Dallenbach Jr.	Roush Racing	Ford	293	0	running	82	$15,150
28	16	44	Rick Wilson	Petty Enterprises	Pontiac	293	0	running	79	$12,025
29	35	85	Ken Bouchard	Mansion Motorsports	Ford	286	0	running	76	$10,350
30	34	71	Dave Marcis	Marcis Auto Racing	Chevrolet	283	0	running	73	$10,250
31	5	14	Terry Labonte	Hagan Racing	Chevrolet	280	0	engine	70	$14,700
32	30	68	Greg Sacks	TriStar Motorsports	Ford	280	0	brakes	67	$10,050
33	37	75	Dick Trickle	Butch Mock Motorsports	Ford	251	0	handling	64	$9,950
34	40	52	Jimmy Means	Jimmy Means Racing	Ford	138	0	rear end	61	$9,850
35	21	83	Lake Speed	Speed Racing	Ford	130	0	engine	58	$9,750
36	15	87	Joe Nemechek	NEMCO Motorsports	Chevrolet	119	0	rocker arm	55	$9,650
37	6	0	Jeff Burton	FILMAR Racing	Ford	86	0	crash	52	$9,550
38	4	25	Ken Schrader	Hendrick Motorsports	Chevrolet	14	0	engine	49	$14,975
39	39	41	Phil Parsons	Larry Hedrick Motorsports	Chevrolet	9	0	crash	46	$10,850
40	36	65	Jerry O'Neil	O'Neil Racing	Chevrolet	9	0	crash	43	$9,250
Official race results

== Standings after the race ==
Drivers' Championship standings

	Pos	Driver	Points
	1	Dale Earnhardt	2,427
	2	Dale Jarrett	2,256 (-171)
	3	Rusty Wallace	2,177 (-250)
	4	Morgan Shepherd	2,112 (–315)
2	5	Davey Allison	2,104 (–323)
	6	Kyle Petty	2,088 (–339)
1	7	Jeff Gordon	2,056 (–371)
2	8	Mark Martin	2,048 (–379)
4	9	Ken Schrader	2,026 (–401)
1	10	Ernie Irvan	2,007 (–420)
Official driver's standings

- Note: Only the first 10 positions are included for the driver standings.

Previous race: 1993 Pepsi 400	NASCAR Winston Cup Series; 1993 season	Next race: 1993 Miller Genuine Draft 500
