= 1993 Miller Genuine Draft 400 (Michigan) =

14th race of the 1993 NASCAR Winston Cup Series

Race details
- Race 14 of 30 in the 1993 NASCAR Winston Cup Series
- The 1993 Miller Genuine Draft 400 program cover, featuring Rusty Wallace. Artwork by NASCAR artist Sam Bass.
- Date: June 20, 1993
- Official name: 25th Annual Miller Genuine Draft 400
- Location: Cambridge Township, Michigan, Michigan International Speedway
- Course: Permanent racing facility
- Course length: 2 miles (3.2 km)
- Distance: 200 laps, 400 mi (643.737 km)
- Scheduled distance: 200 laps, 400 mi (643.737 km)
- Average speed: 148.484 miles per hour (238.962 km/h)

Pole position
Driver	Brett Bodine	King Racing
- Time: 41.036

Most laps led
Driver	Mark Martin	Roush Racing
- Laps: 141

Winner
No. 5	Ricky Rudd	Hendrick Motorsports

Television in the United States
- Network: CBS
- Announcers: Ken Squier, Ned Jarrett, Neil Bonnett

Radio in the United States
- Radio: Motor Racing Network

The 1993 Miller Genuine Draft 400 was the 14th stock car race of the 1993 NASCAR Winston Cup Series season and the 25th iteration of the event. The race was held on Sunday, June 20, 1993, in Cambridge Township, Michigan, at Michigan International Speedway, a 2 miles (3.2 km) moderate-banked D-shaped speedway. The race took the scheduled 200 laps to complete. In the final laps of the race, Hendrick Motorsports driver Ricky Rudd would manage to take advantage of a fuel-stricken Mark Martin, coasting his car to the finish on fuel to take his 14th career NASCAR Winston Cup Series victory and his only victory of the season. To fill out the top three, Hendrick Motorsports driver Jeff Gordon and Morgan–McClure Motorsports driver Ernie Irvan would finish second and third, respectively.

== Background ==
The layout of Michigan International Speedway, the venue where the race was held.

The race was held at Michigan International Speedway, a 2 miles (3.2 km) moderate-banked D-shaped speedway located in Cambridge Township, Michigan. The track is used primarily for NASCAR events. It is known as a "sister track" to Texas World Speedway as MIS' oval design was a direct basis of TWS, with moderate modifications to the banking in the corners, and was used as the basis of Auto Club Speedway. The track is owned by International Speedway Corporation. Michigan International Speedway is recognized as one of motorsports' premier facilities because of its wide racing surface and high banking (by open-wheel standards; the 18-degree banking is modest by stock car standards).

=== Entry list ===
- (R) denotes rookie driver.

#	Driver	Team	Make
1	Rick Mast	Precision Products Racing	Ford
2	Rusty Wallace	Penske Racing South	Pontiac
3	Dale Earnhardt	Richard Childress Racing	Chevrolet
4	Ernie Irvan	Morgan–McClure Motorsports	Chevrolet
5	Ricky Rudd	Hendrick Motorsports	Chevrolet
6	Mark Martin	Roush Racing	Ford
7	Jimmy Hensley	AK Racing	Ford
8	Sterling Marlin	Stavola Brothers Racing	Ford
9	P. J. Jones (R)	Melling Racing	Ford
11	Bill Elliott	Junior Johnson & Associates	Ford
12	Jimmy Spencer	Bobby Allison Motorsports	Ford
14	Terry Labonte	Hagan Racing	Chevrolet
15	Geoff Bodine	Bud Moore Engineering	Ford
16	Wally Dallenbach Jr.	Roush Racing	Ford
17	Darrell Waltrip	Darrell Waltrip Motorsports	Chevrolet
18	Dale Jarrett	Joe Gibbs Racing	Chevrolet
21	Morgan Shepherd	Wood Brothers Racing	Ford
22	Bobby Labonte (R)	Bill Davis Racing	Ford
24	Jeff Gordon (R)	Hendrick Motorsports	Chevrolet
25	Ken Schrader	Hendrick Motorsports	Chevrolet
26	Brett Bodine	King Racing	Ford
27	Hut Stricklin	Junior Johnson & Associates	Ford
28	Davey Allison	Robert Yates Racing	Ford
30	Michael Waltrip	Bahari Racing	Pontiac
32	Jimmy Horton	Active Motorsports	Chevrolet
33	Harry Gant	Leo Jackson Motorsports	Chevrolet
36	H. B. Bailey	Bailey Racing	Pontiac
39	Jim Sauter	Roulo Brothers Racing	Chevrolet
40	Kenny Wallace (R)	SABCO Racing	Pontiac
41	Phil Parsons	Larry Hedrick Motorsports	Chevrolet
42	Kyle Petty	SABCO Racing	Pontiac
44	Rick Wilson	Petty Enterprises	Pontiac
48	Trevor Boys	Hylton Motorsports	Pontiac
52	Jimmy Means	Jimmy Means Racing	Ford
55	Ted Musgrave	RaDiUs Motorsports	Ford
62	Clay Young	Jimmy Means Racing	Ford
68	Greg Sacks	TriStar Motorsports	Ford
71	Dave Marcis	Marcis Auto Racing	Chevrolet
75	Dick Trickle	Butch Mock Motorsports	Ford
81	Jeff Davis	Jeff Davis Racing	Ford
83	Lake Speed	Speed Racing	Ford
90	Bobby Hillin Jr.	Donlavey Racing	Ford
98	Derrike Cope	Cale Yarborough Motorsports	Ford

== Qualifying ==
Qualifying was split into two rounds. The first round was held on Friday, June 18, at 3:30 PM EST. Each driver would have one lap to set a time. During the first round, the top 20 drivers in the round would be guaranteed a starting spot in the race. If a driver was not able to guarantee a spot in the first round, they had the option to scrub their time from the first round and try and run a faster lap time in a second round qualifying run, held on Saturday, June 19, at 11:00 AM EST. As with the first round, each driver would have one lap to set a time. For this specific race, positions 21-40 would be decided on time, and depending on who needed it, a select amount of positions were given to cars who had not otherwise qualified but were high enough in owner's points; up to two provisionals were given. If needed, a past champion who did not qualify on either time or provisionals could use a champion's provisional, adding one more spot to the field.

Brett Bodine, driving for King Racing, won the pole, setting a time of 41.036 and an average speed of 175.456 mph (282.369 km/h) in the first round.

Two drivers would fail to qualify.

=== Full qualifying results ===
Pos.	#	Driver	Team	Make	Time	Speed
1	26	Brett Bodine	King Racing	Ford	41.036	175.456
2	5	Ricky Rudd	Hendrick Motorsports	Chevrolet	41.178	174.851
3	28	Davey Allison	Robert Yates Racing	Ford	41.197	174.770
4	25	Ken Schrader	Hendrick Motorsports	Chevrolet	41.218	174.681
5	4	Ernie Irvan	Morgan–McClure Motorsports	Chevrolet	41.265	174.482
6	3	Dale Earnhardt	Richard Childress Racing	Chevrolet	41.299	174.338
7	6	Mark Martin	Roush Racing	Ford	41.304	174.317
8	83	Lake Speed	Speed Racing	Ford	41.311	174.288
9	1	Rick Mast	Precision Products Racing	Ford	41.374	174.022
10	30	Michael Waltrip	Bahari Racing	Pontiac	41.378	174.006
11	11	Bill Elliott	Junior Johnson & Associates	Ford	41.380	173.997
12	8	Sterling Marlin	Stavola Brothers Racing	Ford	41.424	173.812
13	21	Morgan Shepherd	Wood Brothers Racing	Ford	41.461	173.657
14	17	Darrell Waltrip	Darrell Waltrip Motorsports	Chevrolet	41.527	173.381
15	2	Rusty Wallace	Penske Racing South	Pontiac	41.529	173.373
16	27	Hut Stricklin	Junior Johnson & Associates	Ford	41.603	173.064
17	18	Dale Jarrett	Joe Gibbs Racing	Chevrolet	41.625	172.973
18	15	Geoff Bodine	Bud Moore Engineering	Ford	41.652	172.861
19	22	Bobby Labonte (R)	Bill Davis Racing	Ford	41.699	172.666
20	32	Jimmy Horton	Active Motorsports	Chevrolet	41.705	172.641
Failed to lock in Round 1
21	12	Jimmy Spencer	Bobby Allison Motorsports	Ford	41.513	173.440
22	9	P. J. Jones (R)	Melling Racing	Ford	41.583	173.148
23	24	Jeff Gordon (R)	Hendrick Motorsports	Chevrolet	41.662	172.819
24	44	Rick Wilson	Petty Enterprises	Pontiac	41.711	172.616
25	14	Terry Labonte	Hagan Racing	Chevrolet	41.750	172.455
26	7	Jimmy Hensley	AK Racing	Ford	41.754	172.439
27	16	Wally Dallenbach Jr.	Roush Racing	Ford	41.785	172.311
28	41	Phil Parsons	Larry Hedrick Motorsports	Chevrolet	41.805	172.228
29	42	Kyle Petty	SABCO Racing	Pontiac	41.809	172.212
30	98	Derrike Cope	Cale Yarborough Motorsports	Ford	41.842	172.076
31	90	Bobby Hillin Jr.	Donlavey Racing	Ford	41.866	171.977
32	55	Ted Musgrave	RaDiUs Motorsports	Ford	41.894	171.862
33	40	Kenny Wallace (R)	SABCO Racing	Pontiac	41.960	171.592
34	68	Greg Sacks	TriStar Motorsports	Ford	42.008	171.396
35	75	Dick Trickle	Butch Mock Motorsports	Ford	42.244	170.438
36	71	Dave Marcis	Marcis Auto Racing	Chevrolet	42.308	170.181
37	33	Harry Gant	Leo Jackson Motorsports	Chevrolet	42.332	170.084
38	62	Clay Young	Jimmy Means Racing	Ford	42.667	168.749
39	39	Jim Sauter	Roulo Brothers Racing	Chevrolet	42.787	168.275
40	36	H. B. Bailey	Bailey Racing	Pontiac	42.991	167.477
Provisional
41	52	Jimmy Means	Jimmy Means Racing	Ford	-*	-*
Failed to qualify
42	48	Trevor Boys	Hylton Motorsports	Pontiac	-*	-*
43	81	Jeff Davis	Jeff Davis Racing	Ford	-*	-*
Official first round qualifying results
Official starting lineup

== Race results ==
Fin	St	#	Driver	Team	Make	Laps	Led	Status	Pts	Winnings
1	2	5	Ricky Rudd	Hendrick Motorsports	Chevrolet	200	19	running	180	$77,890
2	23	24	Jeff Gordon (R)	Hendrick Motorsports	Chevrolet	200	2	running	175	$44,915
3	5	4	Ernie Irvan	Morgan–McClure Motorsports	Chevrolet	200	5	running	170	$41,240
4	17	18	Dale Jarrett	Joe Gibbs Racing	Chevrolet	200	0	running	160	$29,590
5	15	2	Rusty Wallace	Penske Racing South	Pontiac	200	0	running	155	$26,160
6	7	6	Mark Martin	Roush Racing	Ford	200	141	running	160	$22,925
7	13	21	Morgan Shepherd	Wood Brothers Racing	Ford	200	2	running	151	$21,460
8	12	8	Sterling Marlin	Stavola Brothers Racing	Ford	200	0	running	142	$20,860
9	11	11	Bill Elliott	Junior Johnson & Associates	Ford	200	0	running	138	$23,710
10	37	33	Harry Gant	Leo Jackson Motorsports	Chevrolet	200	0	running	134	$23,960
11	9	1	Rick Mast	Precision Products Racing	Ford	200	0	running	130	$17,960
12	29	42	Kyle Petty	SABCO Racing	Pontiac	200	0	running	127	$19,660
13	28	41	Phil Parsons	Larry Hedrick Motorsports	Chevrolet	199	0	out of gas	124	$13,935
14	6	3	Dale Earnhardt	Richard Childress Racing	Chevrolet	199	27	running	126	$16,385
15	32	55	Ted Musgrave	RaDiUs Motorsports	Ford	199	0	running	118	$16,235
16	4	25	Ken Schrader	Hendrick Motorsports	Chevrolet	199	0	running	115	$15,460
17	18	15	Geoff Bodine	Bud Moore Engineering	Ford	199	0	running	112	$17,685
18	21	12	Jimmy Spencer	Bobby Allison Motorsports	Ford	199	0	running	109	$14,950
19	14	17	Darrell Waltrip	Darrell Waltrip Motorsports	Chevrolet	199	0	running	106	$19,035
20	25	14	Terry Labonte	Hagan Racing	Chevrolet	198	0	running	103	$14,470
21	16	27	Hut Stricklin	Junior Johnson & Associates	Ford	198	3	running	105	$13,650
22	34	68	Greg Sacks	TriStar Motorsports	Ford	198	1	running	102	$8,685
23	26	7	Jimmy Hensley	AK Racing	Ford	197	0	running	94	$17,975
24	36	71	Dave Marcis	Marcis Auto Racing	Chevrolet	197	0	running	91	$8,465
25	27	16	Wally Dallenbach Jr.	Roush Racing	Ford	197	0	running	88	$13,105
26	39	39	Jim Sauter	Roulo Brothers Racing	Chevrolet	197	0	running	85	$8,195
27	30	98	Derrike Cope	Cale Yarborough Motorsports	Ford	197	0	running	82	$12,785
28	41	52	Jimmy Means	Jimmy Means Racing	Ford	197	0	running	79	$8,075
29	33	40	Kenny Wallace (R)	SABCO Racing	Pontiac	196	0	running	76	$9,965
30	8	83	Lake Speed	Speed Racing	Ford	190	0	engine	73	$7,900
31	35	75	Dick Trickle	Butch Mock Motorsports	Ford	185	0	engine	70	$7,770
32	40	36	H. B. Bailey	Bailey Racing	Pontiac	184	0	running	67	$7,700
33	31	90	Bobby Hillin Jr.	Donlavey Racing	Ford	171	0	engine	64	$7,620
34	24	44	Rick Wilson	Petty Enterprises	Pontiac	144	0	oil leak	61	$9,125
35	3	28	Davey Allison	Robert Yates Racing	Ford	132	0	running	58	$18,900
36	19	22	Bobby Labonte (R)	Bill Davis Racing	Ford	104	0	engine	55	$8,985
37	10	30	Michael Waltrip	Bahari Racing	Pontiac	91	0	valve	52	$11,930
38	22	9	P. J. Jones (R)	Melling Racing	Ford	64	0	head gasket	49	$7,380
39	1	26	Brett Bodine	King Racing	Ford	22	0	engine	46	$15,855
40	38	62	Clay Young	Jimmy Means Racing	Ford	14	0	cylinder	43	$7,295
41	20	32	Jimmy Horton	Active Motorsports	Chevrolet	2	0	crash	40	$7,295
Official race results

== Standings after the race ==
Drivers' Championship standings

	Pos	Driver	Points
	1	Dale Earnhardt	2,157
1	2	Dale Jarrett	1,944 (-213)
2	3	Rusty Wallace	1,888 (-269)
	4	Kyle Petty	1,877 (–280)
1	5	Morgan Shepherd	1,870 (–287)
4	6	Davey Allison	1,864 (–293)
	7	Ken Schrader	1,807 (–350)
	8	Geoff Bodine	1,788 (–369)
	9	Jimmy Spencer	1,746 (–411)
	10	Jeff Gordon	1,745 (–412)
Official driver's standings

- Note: Only the first 10 positions are included for the driver standings.

Previous race: 1993 Champion Spark Plug 500	NASCAR Winston Cup Series; 1993 season	Next race: 1993 Pepsi 400
