= 1993 Champion Spark Plug 500 =

13th race of the 1993 NASCAR Winston Cup Series

Race details
- Race 13 of 30 in the 1993 NASCAR Winston Cup Series
- The 1993 Champion Spark Plug 500 program cover.
- Date: June 13, 1993
- Official name: 12th Annual Champion Spark Plug 500
- Location: Long Pond, Pennsylvania, Pocono Raceway
- Course: Permanent racing facility
- Course length: 2.5 miles (4.0 km)
- Distance: 200 laps, 500 mi (804.672 km)
- Scheduled distance: 200 laps, 500 mi (804.672 km)
- Average speed: 138.005 miles per hour (222.098 km/h)

Pole position
Driver	Ken Schrader	Hendrick Motorsports
- Time: 55.277

Most laps led
Driver	Kyle Petty	SABCO Racing
- Laps: 148

Winner
No. 42	Kyle Petty	SABCO Racing

Television in the United States
- Network: ESPN
- Announcers: Bob Jenkins, Ned Jarrett, Benny Parsons

Radio in the United States
- Radio: Motor Racing Network

The 1993 Champion Spark Plug 500 was the 13th stock car race of the 1993 NASCAR Winston Cup Series season and the 12th iteration of the event. The race was held on Sunday, June 13, 1993, in Long Pond, Pennsylvania, at Pocono Raceway, a 2.5 miles (4.0 km) triangular permanent course. The race took the scheduled 200 laps to complete. At race's end, SABCO Racing driver Kyle Petty would manage to dominate the majority of the race to take his seventh career NASCAR Winston Cup Series victory and his only victory of the season. To fill out the top three, Hendrick Motorsports driver Ken Schrader and Leo Jackson Motorsports driver Harry Gant would finish second and third, respectively.

== Background ==
The layout of Pocono Raceway, the venue where the race was held.

The race was held at Pocono Raceway, which is a three-turn superspeedway located in Long Pond, Pennsylvania. The track hosts one annual NASCAR Cup Series race, as well as O'Reilly Auto Parts Series and Truck Series events. Until 2019, the track also hosted an IndyCar Series race.

Pocono Raceway is one of a very few NASCAR tracks not owned by either Speedway Motorsports, Inc. or International Speedway Corporation. It is operated by the Igdalsky siblings Brandon, Nicholas, and sister Ashley, and cousins Joseph IV and Chase Mattioli, all of whom are third-generation members of the family-owned Mattco Inc, started by Joseph II and Rose Mattioli.

Outside of the NASCAR races, the track is used throughout the year by Sports Car Club of America (SCCA) and motorcycle clubs as well as racing schools and an IndyCar race. The triangular oval also has three separate infield sections of racetrack – North Course, East Course and South Course. Each of these infield sections use a separate portion of the tri-oval to complete the track. During regular non-race weekends, multiple clubs can use the track by running on different infield sections. Also some of the infield sections can be run in either direction, or multiple infield sections can be put together – such as running the North Course and the South Course and using the tri-oval to connect the two.

=== Entry list ===
- (R) denotes rookie driver.

#	Driver	Team	Make
1	Rick Mast	Precision Products Racing	Ford
2	Rusty Wallace	Penske Racing South	Pontiac
3	Dale Earnhardt	Richard Childress Racing	Chevrolet
4	Ernie Irvan	Morgan–McClure Motorsports	Chevrolet
5	Ricky Rudd	Hendrick Motorsports	Chevrolet
6	Mark Martin	Roush Racing	Ford
7	Jimmy Hensley	AK Racing	Ford
8	Sterling Marlin	Stavola Brothers Racing	Ford
11	Bill Elliott	Junior Johnson & Associates	Ford
12	Jimmy Spencer	Bobby Allison Motorsports	Ford
14	Terry Labonte	Hagan Racing	Chevrolet
15	Geoff Bodine	Bud Moore Engineering	Ford
16	Wally Dallenbach Jr.	Roush Racing	Ford
17	Darrell Waltrip	Darrell Waltrip Motorsports	Chevrolet
18	Dale Jarrett	Joe Gibbs Racing	Chevrolet
21	Morgan Shepherd	Wood Brothers Racing	Ford
22	Bobby Labonte (R)	Bill Davis Racing	Ford
24	Jeff Gordon (R)	Hendrick Motorsports	Chevrolet
25	Ken Schrader	Hendrick Motorsports	Chevrolet
26	Brett Bodine	King Racing	Ford
27	Hut Stricklin	Junior Johnson & Associates	Ford
28	Davey Allison	Robert Yates Racing	Ford
29	Kerry Teague	Linro Motorsports	Chevrolet
30	Michael Waltrip	Bahari Racing	Pontiac
32	Jimmy Horton	Active Motorsports	Chevrolet
33	Harry Gant	Leo Jackson Motorsports	Chevrolet
40	Kenny Wallace (R)	SABCO Racing	Pontiac
41	Phil Parsons	Larry Hedrick Motorsports	Chevrolet
42	Kyle Petty	SABCO Racing	Pontiac
44	Rick Wilson	Petty Enterprises	Pontiac
48	Trevor Boys	Hylton Motorsports	Pontiac
52	Jimmy Means	Jimmy Means Racing	Ford
53	Graham Taylor	Jimmy Means Racing	Ford
55	Ted Musgrave	RaDiUs Motorsports	Ford
68	Greg Sacks	TriStar Motorsports	Ford
71	Dave Marcis	Marcis Auto Racing	Chevrolet
75	Dick Trickle	Butch Mock Motorsports	Ford
83	Lake Speed	Speed Racing	Ford
90	Bobby Hillin Jr.	Donlavey Racing	Ford
98	Derrike Cope	Cale Yarborough Motorsports	Ford

== Qualifying ==
Qualifying was split into two rounds. The first round was held on Friday, June 11, at 3:00 PM EST. Each driver would have one lap to set a time. During the first round, the top 20 drivers in the round would be guaranteed a starting spot in the race. If a driver was not able to guarantee a spot in the first round, they had the option to scrub their time from the first round and try and run a faster lap time in a second round qualifying run, held on Saturday, June 12, at 10:30 AM EST. As with the first round, each driver would have one lap to set a time. For this specific race, positions 21-40 would be decided on time, and depending on who needed it, a select amount of positions were given to cars who had not otherwise qualified but were high enough in owner's points; up to two provisionals were given. If needed, a past champion who did not qualify on either time or provisionals could use a champion's provisional, adding one more spot to the field.

Ken Schrader, driving for Hendrick Motorsports, won the pole, setting a time of 55.277 and an average speed of 162.816 mph (262.027 km/h) in the first round.

No drivers would fail to qualify.

=== Full qualifying results ===
Pos.	#	Driver	Team	Make	Time	Speed
1	25	Ken Schrader	Hendrick Motorsports	Chevrolet	55.277	162.816
2	6	Mark Martin	Roush Racing	Ford	55.373	162.534
3	27	Hut Stricklin	Junior Johnson & Associates	Ford	55.382	162.508
4	24	Jeff Gordon (R)	Hendrick Motorsports	Chevrolet	55.589	161.903
5	3	Dale Earnhardt	Richard Childress Racing	Chevrolet	55.592	161.894
6	26	Brett Bodine	King Racing	Ford	55.666	161.679
7	28	Davey Allison	Robert Yates Racing	Ford	55.669	161.670
8	42	Kyle Petty	SABCO Racing	Pontiac	55.713	161.542
9	12	Jimmy Spencer	Bobby Allison Motorsports	Ford	55.765	161.392
10	2	Rusty Wallace	Penske Racing South	Pontiac	55.766	161.389
11	83	Lake Speed	Speed Racing	Ford	55.926	160.927
12	5	Ricky Rudd	Hendrick Motorsports	Chevrolet	55.978	160.777
13	1	Rick Mast	Precision Products Racing	Ford	56.031	160.625
14	15	Geoff Bodine	Bud Moore Engineering	Ford	56.118	160.376
15	55	Ted Musgrave	RaDiUs Motorsports	Ford	56.169	160.231
16	11	Bill Elliott	Junior Johnson & Associates	Ford	56.207	160.122
17	4	Ernie Irvan	Morgan–McClure Motorsports	Chevrolet	56.211	160.111
18	7	Jimmy Hensley	AK Racing	Ford	56.221	160.083
19	90	Bobby Hillin Jr.	Donlavey Racing	Ford	56.233	160.048
20	16	Wally Dallenbach Jr.	Roush Racing	Ford	56.284	159.903
Failed to lock in Round 1
21	18	Dale Jarrett	Joe Gibbs Racing	Chevrolet	56.298	159.864
22	44	Rick Wilson	Petty Enterprises	Pontiac	56.319	159.804
23	22	Bobby Labonte (R)	Bill Davis Racing	Ford	56.457	159.413
24	98	Derrike Cope	Cale Yarborough Motorsports	Ford	56.495	159.306
25	21	Morgan Shepherd	Wood Brothers Racing	Ford	56.570	159.095
26	33	Harry Gant	Leo Jackson Motorsports	Chevrolet	56.670	158.814
27	30	Michael Waltrip	Bahari Racing	Pontiac	56.693	158.750
28	41	Phil Parsons	Larry Hedrick Motorsports	Chevrolet	56.694	158.747
29	68	Greg Sacks	TriStar Motorsports	Ford	56.700	158.730
30	14	Terry Labonte	Hagan Racing	Chevrolet	56.720	158.674
31	40	Kenny Wallace (R)	SABCO Racing	Pontiac	56.767	158.543
32	8	Sterling Marlin	Stavola Brothers Racing	Ford	56.806	158.434
33	71	Dave Marcis	Marcis Auto Racing	Chevrolet	56.887	158.208
34	17	Darrell Waltrip	Darrell Waltrip Motorsports	Chevrolet	57.012	157.862
35	75	Dick Trickle	Butch Mock Motorsports	Ford	57.048	157.762
36	32	Jimmy Horton	Active Motorsports	Chevrolet	57.714	155.941
37	52	Jimmy Means	Jimmy Means Racing	Ford	57.892	155.462
38	29	Kerry Teague	Linro Motorsports	Chevrolet	59.365	151.604
39	48	Trevor Boys	Hylton Motorsports	Pontiac	1:02.007	145.145
40	53	Graham Taylor	Jimmy Means Racing	Ford	1:03.651	141.396
Official first round qualifying results
Official starting lineup

== Race results ==
Fin	St	#	Driver	Team	Make	Laps	Led	Status	Pts	Winnings
1	8	42	Kyle Petty	SABCO Racing	Pontiac	200	148	running	185	$44,960
2	1	25	Ken Schrader	Hendrick Motorsports	Chevrolet	200	4	running	175	$58,435
3	26	33	Harry Gant	Leo Jackson Motorsports	Chevrolet	200	2	running	170	$38,335
4	9	12	Jimmy Spencer	Bobby Allison Motorsports	Ford	200	0	running	160	$31,410
5	15	55	Ted Musgrave	RaDiUs Motorsports	Ford	200	1	running	160	$24,040
6	7	28	Davey Allison	Robert Yates Racing	Ford	200	6	running	155	$24,115
7	25	21	Morgan Shepherd	Wood Brothers Racing	Ford	200	3	running	151	$17,165
8	32	8	Sterling Marlin	Stavola Brothers Racing	Ford	200	5	running	147	$16,365
9	12	5	Ricky Rudd	Hendrick Motorsports	Chevrolet	200	1	running	143	$15,765
10	16	11	Bill Elliott	Junior Johnson & Associates	Ford	200	0	running	134	$22,015
11	5	3	Dale Earnhardt	Richard Childress Racing	Chevrolet	200	20	running	135	$14,815
12	22	44	Rick Wilson	Petty Enterprises	Pontiac	199	0	running	127	$11,365
13	3	27	Hut Stricklin	Junior Johnson & Associates	Ford	199	0	running	124	$13,865
14	28	41	Phil Parsons	Larry Hedrick Motorsports	Chevrolet	199	0	running	121	$10,465
15	31	40	Kenny Wallace (R)	SABCO Racing	Pontiac	199	0	running	118	$11,615
16	13	1	Rick Mast	Precision Products Racing	Ford	199	0	running	115	$13,015
17	18	7	Jimmy Hensley	AK Racing	Ford	199	0	running	112	$17,465
18	29	68	Greg Sacks	TriStar Motorsports	Ford	198	0	running	109	$7,965
19	21	18	Dale Jarrett	Joe Gibbs Racing	Chevrolet	195	1	running	111	$15,815
20	23	22	Bobby Labonte (R)	Bill Davis Racing	Ford	194	0	running	103	$10,490
21	27	30	Michael Waltrip	Bahari Racing	Pontiac	190	0	running	100	$12,060
22	37	52	Jimmy Means	Jimmy Means Racing	Ford	188	1	running	102	$7,310
23	33	71	Dave Marcis	Marcis Auto Racing	Chevrolet	180	0	engine	94	$8,210
24	14	15	Geoff Bodine	Bud Moore Engineering	Ford	173	0	axle	91	$15,160
25	20	16	Wally Dallenbach Jr.	Roush Racing	Ford	150	0	transmission	88	$11,710
26	38	29	Kerry Teague	Linro Motorsports	Chevrolet	135	0	engine	85	$7,060
27	11	83	Lake Speed	Speed Racing	Ford	127	0	rocker arm	82	$7,010
28	4	24	Jeff Gordon (R)	Hendrick Motorsports	Chevrolet	113	0	running	79	$8,535
29	6	26	Brett Bodine	King Racing	Ford	109	0	timing chain	76	$11,460
30	34	17	Darrell Waltrip	Darrell Waltrip Motorsports	Chevrolet	89	0	engine	73	$16,660
31	2	6	Mark Martin	Roush Racing	Ford	85	7	engine	75	$14,810
32	30	14	Terry Labonte	Hagan Racing	Chevrolet	83	0	engine	67	$11,285
33	24	98	Derrike Cope	Cale Yarborough Motorsports	Ford	62	0	clutch	64	$11,660
34	17	4	Ernie Irvan	Morgan–McClure Motorsports	Chevrolet	58	0	engine	61	$16,185
35	39	48	Trevor Boys	Hylton Motorsports	Pontiac	38	1	vibration	63	$6,510
36	35	75	Dick Trickle	Butch Mock Motorsports	Ford	17	0	engine	55	$6,435
37	36	32	Jimmy Horton	Active Motorsports	Chevrolet	16	0	engine	52	$6,360
38	19	90	Bobby Hillin Jr.	Donlavey Racing	Ford	4	0	engine	49	$6,320
39	10	2	Rusty Wallace	Penske Racing South	Pontiac	4	0	engine	46	$14,285
40	40	53	Graham Taylor	Jimmy Means Racing	Ford	3	0	handling	43	$6,210
Official race results

== Standings after the race ==
Drivers' Championship standings

	Pos	Driver	Points
	1	Dale Earnhardt	2,031
2	2	Davey Allison	1,806 (-225)
	3	Dale Jarrett	1,784 (-247)
3	4	Kyle Petty	1,750 (–281)
3	5	Rusty Wallace	1,733 (–298)
	6	Morgan Shepherd	1,719 (–312)
1	7	Ken Schrader	1,692 (–339)
3	8	Geoff Bodine	1,676 (–355)
2	9	Jimmy Spencer	1,637 (–394)
	10	Jeff Gordon	1,570 (–461)
Official driver's standings

- Note: Only the first 10 positions are included for the driver standings.

Previous race: 1993 Budweiser 500	NASCAR Winston Cup Series; 1993 season	Next race: 1993 Miller Genuine Draft 400 (Michigan)
