= Ken Bouchard =

American racing driver (born 1955)

- Born: Kenneth Aaron Bouchard; April 6, 1955 (age 71); Fitchburg, Massachusetts, U.S.
- Awards: 1988 Winston Cup Series Rookie of the Year; Named one of NASCAR's 50 Greatest Modified Drivers

NASCAR Cup Series career
- 33 races run over 5 years
- Best finish: 25th (1988)
- First race: 1987 Miller American 400 (Michigan)
- Last race: 1994 Hooters 500 (Atlanta)
Wins	Top tens	Poles
0	1	0

NASCAR O'Reilly Auto Parts Series career
- 44 races run over 9 years
- Best finish: 26th (1986)
- First race: 1983 Goody's 300 (Daytona)
- Last race: 1991 NE Chevy 250 (Loudon)
Wins	Top tens	Poles
0	12	0
- Statistics up to date as of December 10, 2012.

Kenneth Aaron Bouchard (April 6, 1955) is an American former NASCAR driver and the 1988 Rookie of the Year. His brother Ron Bouchard was the 1981 Rookie of the Year.

== Modified career ==
Before he came to NASCAR, Bouchard was a modified racer in the Northeast. He won eleven NASCAR modified races in one season. He was voted one of NASCAR Modified’s 50 Greatest Drivers of All-Time. He then ran a part-time Busch Series schedule. He has driven for car owners including Sonny Koszela No. 15, and Len Boehler No. 3. Bouchard had success driving the Ted Marsh No. 55 in which he won several races and championships.

== Winston Cup career ==
Bouchard made his Winston Cup debut in 1987 at the Miller American 400 at Michigan, finishing 32nd after suffering oil pressure problems. The next year, he raced full-time in Winston Cup in an unsponsored car owned by Bob Whitcomb. Despite this, he finished eighth at North Carolina Speedway and defeated promising rivals Ernie Irvan and Brad Noffsinger to become the 1988 NASCAR Rookie of the Year. In 1989, however, he was released from his ride after just four races. He returned in 1993, running three races for Thee Dixon in his No. 85 Safety-Kleen/Burger King Ford. He ran his last Winston Cup race in 1994 at the Hooters 500, where his No. 67 Ford expired after 280 laps because of valve trouble, finishing 29th. Since then, Bouchard has competed in five Craftsman Truck Series races. He also attempted several Winston Cup events, but failed to qualify for each of them, the last of which was the 1999 Pepsi 400, in the No. 84 Chevy sponsored by Island Oasis.

== Driving instructor career ==
Bouchard now operates the Drive to Victory Lane Racing School at Thompson International Speedway. He finished thirteenth in the "Icebreaker 2006" NASCAR Whelen Modified Tour event at the track.

== Motorsports career results ==
=== NASCAR ===
(key) (Bold – Pole position awarded by qualifying time. Italics – Pole position earned by points standings or practice time. * – Most laps led.)

==== Winston Cup Series ====
NASCAR Winston Cup Series results
Year	Team	No.	Make	1	2	3	4	5	6	7	8	9	10	11	12	13	14	15	16	17	18	19	20	21	22	23	24	25	26	27	28	29	30	31	32	33	34	NWCC	Pts	Ref
1987	Sullivan Racing	91	Chevy	DAY	CAR	RCH	ATL	DAR	NWS	BRI	MAR	TAL	CLT	DOV	POC	RSD	MCH; 32	DAY	POC	TAL	GLN	MCH	BRI	DAR	RCH	DOV	MAR	NWS	CLT	CAR	RSD	ATL						95th	67	
1988	Whitcomb Racing	10	Ford	DAY; DNQ	RCH; 23	CAR; 8	ATL; 16	DAR; 13	BRI; 21		MAR; 31	TAL; DNQ	CLT; 11	DOV; 14	RSD; DNQ	POC; 14	MCH; 17	DAY; 36	POC; 16	TAL; 35	GLN; 27	MCH; 25	BRI; DNQ	DAR; 18	RCH; 19	DOV; 25	MAR; 17	CLT; 33	NWS; 27									25th	2378	
1988	Whitcomb Racing	10	Chevy							NWS; 27																												25th	2378	
1988	Whitcomb Racing	10	Pontiac																											CAR; 18	PHO; 23	ATL; DNQ						25th	2378	
1989	Whitcomb Racing	10	Pontiac	DAY; 16	CAR; 38	ATL; 37	RCH; DNQ	DAR; 22	BRI	NWS	MAR	TAL	CLT	DOV	SON	POC	MCH	DAY	POC	TAL	GLN	MCH	BRI	DAR	RCH	DOV	MAR	CLT	NWS	CAR	PHO	ATL						48th	313	
1993	Mansion Motorsports	85	Ford	DAY	CAR	RCH	ATL	DAR	BRI	NWS	MAR	TAL; 40	SON	CLT; DNQ	DOV; DNQ	POC	MCH	DAY; DNQ	NHA; 29	POC; 25	TAL	GLN	MCH; DNQ	BRI	DAR	RCH	DOV	MAR	NWS	CLT	CAR	PHO	ATL					52nd	207	
1994	Cunningham Racing	67	Ford	DAY	CAR	RCH	ATL	DAR	BRI	NWS	MAR	TAL	SON	CLT	DOV	POC	MCH	DAY	NHA	POC	TAL	IND; DNQ	GLN	MCH	BRI	DAR	RCH	DOV	MAR	NWS	CLT; DNQ	CAR	PHO	ATL; 29				69th	76	
1995	Cunningham Racing	67	Ford	DAY; DNQ	CAR	RCH	ATL; DNQ	DAR	BRI	NWS	MAR	TAL	SON	CLT	DOV	POC	MCH	DAY	NHA	POC	TAL	IND	GLN	MCH	BRI	DAR	RCH	DOV	MAR	NWS	CLT	CAR	PHO	ATL				NA	-	
1998	Mansion Motorsports	85	Ford	DAY	CAR	LVS	ATL	DAR	BRI	TEX	MAR	TAL	CAL	CLT	DOV	RCH	MCH	POC	SON	NHA	POC	IND	GLN	MCH	BRI; DNQ													NA	-	
1998	T.R.I.X. Racing	79	Chevy																							NHA; DNQ	DAR	RCH; DNQ	DOV	MAR; DNQ	CLT	TAL	DAY	PHO	CAR	ATL		NA	-	
1999	Barkdoll Racing	73	Chevy	DAY; DNQ	CAR	LVS	ATL	DAR																														NA	-	
1999	PBH Motorsports	84	Chevy						TEX; DNQ	BRI	MAR	TAL; DNQ	CAL	RCH	CLT	DOV	MCH	POC	SON	DAY; DNQ	NHA	POC	IND	GLN	MCH	BRI	DAR	RCH	NHA	DOV	MAR	CLT	TAL	CAR	PHO	HOM	ATL	NA	-	

===== Daytona 500 =====
Year	Team	Manufacturer	Start	Finish
1988	Whitcomb Racing	Ford	DNQ	
1989	Whitcomb Racing	Pontiac	15	16
1995	Cunningham Racing	Ford	DNQ	
1999	Barkdoll Racing	Chevrolet	DNQ	

==== Busch Series ====
NASCAR Busch Series results
Year	Team	No.	Make	1	2	3	4	5	6	7	8	9	10	11	12	13	14	15	16	17	18	19	20	21	22	23	24	25	26	27	28	29	30	31	32	33	34	35	NBSC	Pts	Ref
1983		08	Pontiac	DAY; 12	RCH	CAR	HCY	MAR	NWS	SBO	GPS	LGY	DOV; 10	BRI	CLT	SBO	HCY	ROU	SBO	ROU	CRW	ROU	SBO	HCY	LGY	IRP	GPS	BRI	HCY	DAR	RCH	NWS	SBO	MAR	ROU	CLT	HCY	MAR	75th	261	
1984	Sullivan Racing	65	Pontiac	DAY; 24	RCH	CAR	HCY	MAR	DAR	ROU	NSV	LGY	MLW	DOV																									58th	267	
1984	Sullivan Racing	65	Olds												CLT; 19	SBO	HCY	ROU	SBO	ROU	HCY	IRP	LGY	SBO	BRI	DAR	RCH	NWS	CLT; 31	HCY	CAR	MAR							58th	267	
1985	Sullivan Racing	65	Olds	DAY; 15	CAR	HCY	BRI	MAR	DAR	SBO	LGY	DOV; 14	CLT; 10	SBO	HCY	ROU	IRP	SBO	LGY	HCY	MLW	BRI	DAR; 9	RCH	NWS	ROU	CLT; 31	HCY											33rd	719	
1985	Sullivan Racing	65	Pontiac																										CAR; 9	MAR									33rd	719	
1986	Marty Bezema	10	Buick	DAY; 32	CAR; 6	HCY	MAR	BRI; 9	DAR; 18	SBO; 9	LGY; 23	JFC; 17	DOV; 9	CLT; 27	SBO	HCY	ROU	IRP	SBO	RAL	OXF	SBO	HCY	LGY	ROU	BRI	DAR; 29	RCH	DOV; 7	MAR	ROU	CLT; 18	CAR	MAR					26th	1359	
1987	Whitcomb Racing	10	Chevy	DAY; 25	HCY	MAR	DAR; 7	BRI	LGY	SBO	CLT; 8	DOV; 6	IRP	ROU	JFC	OXF	SBO	HCY	RAL	LGY	ROU	BRI	JFC	DAR; 13	RCH	DOV; 21	MAR	CLT; 29	CAR	MAR									38th	650	
1988	Whitcomb Racing	1	Chevy	DAY	HCY	CAR	MAR	DAR	BRI	LNG	NZH	SBO	NSV	CLT	DOV	ROU	LAN	LVL	MYB	OXF	SBO	HCY	LNG	IRP	ROU	BRI	DAR	RCH	DOV	MAR	CLT; 18	CAR	MAR						78th	109	
1989	Whitcomb Racing	0	Pontiac	DAY; 35																																			73rd	176	
1989	Whitcomb Racing	10	Pontiac		CAR; 32	MAR	HCY	DAR	BRI	NZH	SBO	LAN	NSV	CLT	DOV	ROU	LVL	VOL	MYB	SBO	HCY	DUB	IRP	ROU	BRI	DAR	RCH												73rd	176	
1989		18	Olds																									DOV; 18	MAR	CLT	CAR	MAR							73rd	176	
1990		72	Pontiac	DAY	RCH	CAR	MAR	HCY	DAR	BRI	LAN	SBO	NZH	HCY	CLT	DOV; 16	ROU	VOL	MYB	OXF; 37	NHA; 37	SBO	DUB	IRP	ROU	BRI	DAR	RCH	DOV; 13	MAR	CLT	NHA; 38	CAR	MAR					56th	392	
1991		12	Pontiac	DAY; 43	RCH	CAR	MAR	VOL	HCY	DAR	BRI	LAN	SBO	NZH; 24	CLT	DOV	ROU	HCY	MYB	GLN	OXF; 24																		56th	374	
1991		72	Pontiac																			NHA; 33	SBO	DUB	IRP	ROU	BRI	DAR	RCH	DOV	CLT								56th	374	
1991		92	Pontiac																													NHA; 23	CAR	MAR					56th	374	
1998	Washington-Erving Motorsports	50	Ford	DAY	CAR	LVS	NSV	DAR	BRI	TEX	HCY	TAL	NHA	NZH	CLT	DOV	RCH	PPR	GLN	MLW	MYB	CAL	SBO	IRP	MCH	BRI	DAR	RCH	DOV	CLT	GTY	CAR	ATL; DNQ	HOM					NA	-	

==== Craftsman Truck Series ====
NASCAR Craftsman Truck Series results
Year	Team	No.	Make	1	2	3	4	5	6	7	8	9	10	11	12	13	14	15	16	17	18	19	20	21	22	23	24	25	26	27	NCTC	Pts	Ref
1996	Brevak Racing	1	Ford	HOM	PHO	POR	EVG	TUS	CNS	HPT	BRI	NZH	MLW	LVL	I70	IRP	FLM	GLN	NSV	RCH	NHA; 16	MAR	NWS	SON	MMR	PHO					98th	116	
1996	MB Motorsports	26	Ford																								LVS; DNQ				98th	116	
1997	Petty Enterprises	42	Dodge	WDW	TUS	HOM	PHO	POR	EVG	I70	NHA	TEX; 10	BRI	NZH	MLW	LVL	CNS	HPT	IRP	FLM	NSV	GLN	RCH	MAR	SON	MMR	CAL	PHO			99th	134	
1997	Doran Racing	77	Chevy																										LVS; 23		99th	134	
1998	Doran Racing	77	Chevy	WDW; DNQ	HOM; DNQ	PHO	POR	EVG	I70	GLN	TEX																				48th	350	
1998	Team Racing	11	Chevy									BRI; 16	MLW; DNQ	NZH; 17	CAL	PPR	IRP	NHA	FLM	NSV	HPT	LVL	RCH	MEM	GTY	MAR	SON	MMR	PHO	LVS	48th	350	

==== Winston West Series ====
NASCAR Winston West Series results
Year	Team	No.	Make	1	2	3	4	5	6	7	8	NWWSC	Pts
1988	Whitcomb Racing	10	Ford	SON	MMR	RSD; DNQ	SGP	POR	EVG	MMR	PHO	N/A	-

==== Whelen Southern Modified Tour ====
NASCAR Whelen Southern Modified Tour results
Year	Car owner	No.	Make	1	2	3	4	5	6	7	8	9	10	11	NSWMTC	Pts
2012	John Olender, Jr.	55	Chevy	CRW	CRW	SBO	CRW	CRW	BGS	BRI	LGY	THO; 15	CRW	CLT	42nd	29

=== ARCA Bondo/Mar-Hyde Series ===
(key) (Bold – Pole position awarded by qualifying time. Italics – Pole position earned by points standings or practice time. * – Most laps led.)

ARCA Bondo/Mar-Hyde Series results
Year	Team	No.	Make	1	2	3	4	5	6	7	8	9	10	11	12	13	14	15	16	17	18	19	20	21	ABSC	Pts	Ref
1987	Whitcomb Racing	81	Chevy	DAY	ATL	TAL	DEL	ACS	TOL	ROC	POC	FRS	KIL	TAL	FRS	ISF	INF	DSF	SLM	ATL; 5					86th	-	
1999	PBH Motorsports	88	Pontiac	DAY	ATL	SLM	AND	CLT; 12	MCH	POC	TOL	SBS	BLN	POC	KIL	FRS	FLM	ISF	WIN	DSF	SLM	CLT	TAL	ATL	97th	170	

Preceded by Davey Allison	NASCAR Rookie of the Year; 1988	Succeeded by Dick Trickle
