= 1989 The Budweiser at The Glen =

18th race of 1989 NASCAR Winston Cup Series

1989 Budweiser at The Glen
Race details
- Race 18 of 29 in the 1989 NASCAR Winston Cup Series
- The 1989 Budweiser at The Glen program cover.
- Date: August 13, 1989
- Official name: 4th Annual The Budweiser at The Glen
- Location: Watkins Glen, New York, Watkins Glen International
- Course: Permanent racing facility
- Course length: 2.428 miles (3.907 km)
- Distance: 90 laps, 218.52 mi (351.673 km)
- Scheduled distance: 90 laps, 218.52 mi (351.673 km)
- Average speed: 92.452 miles per hour (148.787 km/h)
- Attendance: 108,000

Pole position
Driver	Morgan Shepherd	RahMoc Enterprises
- Time: 1:12.564

Most laps led
Driver	Morgan Shepherd	RahMoc Enterprises
- Laps: 22

Winner
No. 27	Rusty Wallace	Blue Max Racing

Television in the United States
- Network: ESPN
- Announcers: Bob Jenkins, Ned Jarrett, Benny Parsons

Radio in the United States
- Radio: Motor Racing Network

The 1989 The Budweiser at The Glen was the 18th stock car race of the 1989 NASCAR Winston Cup Series season and the fourth iteration of the event. The race was held on Sunday, August 13, 1989, before an audience of 108,000 in Watkins Glen, New York, at the shortened layout of Watkins Glen International, a 2.428-mile (3.907 km) permanent road course layout. In the final laps of the race, Blue Max Racing driver Rusty Wallace was able to take advantage of numerous misfortunes of numerous competitors behind him, leading the final 14 laps to take his 14th career NASCAR Winston Cup Series victory and his fourth victory of the season. To fill out the top three, Roush Racing driver Mark Martin and Richard Childress Racing driver Dale Earnhardt would finish second and third, respectively.

== Background ==
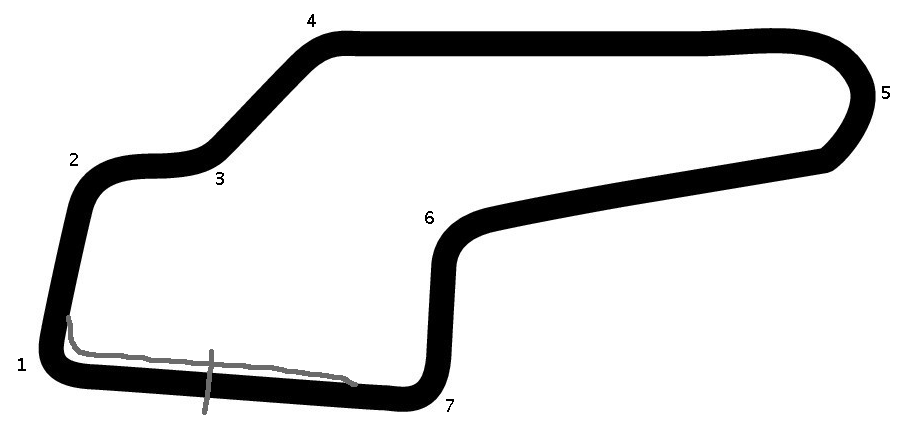
The layout of Watkins Glen International NASCAR used at the time.

Watkins Glen International (nicknamed "The Glen") is an automobile race track located in Watkins Glen, New York at the southern tip of Seneca Lake. It was long known around the world as the home of the Formula One United States Grand Prix, which it hosted for twenty consecutive years (1961–1980), but the site has been home to road racing of nearly every class, including the World Sportscar Championship, Trans-Am, Can-Am, NASCAR Sprint Cup Series, the International Motor Sports Association and the IndyCar Series.

Initially, public roads in the village were used for the race course. In 1956 a permanent circuit for the race was built. In 1968 the race was extended to six hours, becoming the 6 Hours of Watkins Glen. The circuit's current layout has more or less been the same since 1971, although a chicane was installed at the uphill Esses in 1975 to slow cars through these corners, where there was a fatality during practice at the 1973 United States Grand Prix. The chicane was removed in 1985, but another chicane called the "Inner Loop" was installed near turn 5 in 1992 after J. D. McDuffie's fatal accident during the previous year's NASCAR Winston Cup event.

The circuit is known as the Mecca of North American road racing and is a very popular venue among fans and drivers. The facility is currently owned by NASCAR.

=== Entry list ===
- (R) denotes rookie driver.

#	Driver	Team	Make
2	Ernie Irvan	U.S. Racing	Pontiac
3	Dale Earnhardt	Richard Childress Racing	Chevrolet
4	Rick Wilson	Morgan–McClure Motorsports	Oldsmobile
04	Tom Rotsell	Hakes Racing	Ford
5	Geoff Bodine	Hendrick Motorsports	Chevrolet
6	Mark Martin	Roush Racing	Ford
7	Alan Kulwicki	AK Racing	Ford
8	Bobby Hillin Jr.	Stavola Brothers Racing	Buick
9	Bill Elliott	Melling Racing	Ford
10	Derrike Cope	Whitcomb Racing	Pontiac
11	Terry Labonte	Junior Johnson & Associates	Ford
13	Oma Kimbrough	Rosenblum Racing	Chevrolet
14	A. J. Foyt	A. J. Foyt Racing	Oldsmobile
15	Brett Bodine	Bud Moore Engineering	Ford
16	Larry Pearson (R)	Pearson Racing	Buick
17	Darrell Waltrip	Hendrick Motorsports	Chevrolet
18	Tommy Kendall	Hendrick Motorsports	Chevrolet
21	Neil Bonnett	Wood Brothers Racing	Ford
25	Ken Schrader	Hendrick Motorsports	Chevrolet
26	Ricky Rudd	King Racing	Buick
27	Rusty Wallace	Blue Max Racing	Pontiac
28	Davey Allison	Robert Yates Racing	Ford
29	Dale Jarrett	Cale Yarborough Motorsports	Pontiac
30	Michael Waltrip	Bahari Racing	Pontiac
33	Harry Gant	Jackson Bros. Motorsports	Oldsmobile
38	Dick Johnson	Dick Johnson Racing	Ford
40	Darin Brassfield	Brassfield Racing	Chevrolet
41	Ted Thomas	T&O Racing	Ford
43	Richard Petty	Petty Enterprises	Pontiac
44	Jim Sauter	Group 44	Pontiac
52	Jimmy Means	Jimmy Means Racing	Pontiac
55	Phil Parsons	Jackson Bros. Motorsports	Oldsmobile
57	Hut Stricklin (R)	Osterlund Racing	Pontiac
70	J. D. McDuffie	McDuffie Racing	Pontiac
71	Dave Marcis	Marcis Auto Racing	Chevrolet
75	Morgan Shepherd	RahMoc Enterprises	Pontiac
83	Eddie Bierschwale	Speed Racing	Oldsmobile
84	Dick Trickle (R)	Stavola Brothers Racing	Buick
88	Jimmy Spencer (R)	Baker–Schiff Racing	Pontiac
90	Stan Barrett	Donlavey Racing	Ford
94	Sterling Marlin	Hagan Racing	Oldsmobile

== Qualifying ==
Qualifying was split into two rounds. The first round was held on Friday, August 11, at 1:00 PM EST. Each driver would have one lap to set a time. During the first round, the top 20 drivers in the round would be guaranteed a starting spot in the race. If a driver was not able to guarantee a spot in the first round, they had the option to scrub their time from the first round and try and run a faster lap time in a second round qualifying run, held on Saturday, August 12, at 11:00 AM EST. As with the first round, each driver would have one lap to set a time. For this specific race, positions 21-40 would be decided on time, and depending on who needed it, a select amount of positions were given to cars who had not otherwise qualified on time but were high enough in owner's points; up to two provisionals were given.

Morgan Shepherd, driving for RahMoc Enterprises, would win the pole, setting a time of 1:12.564 and an average speed of 120.456 mph (193.855 km/h) in the first round.

Tom Rotsell was the only driver to fail to qualify.

=== Full qualifying results ===
Pos.	#	Driver	Team	Make	Time	Speed
1	75	Morgan Shepherd	RahMoc Enterprises	Pontiac	1:12.564	120.456
2	5	Geoff Bodine	Hendrick Motorsports	Chevrolet	1:12.601	120.395
3	11	Terry Labonte	Junior Johnson & Associates	Ford	1:12.691	120.246
4	3	Dale Earnhardt	Richard Childress Racing	Chevrolet	1:12.743	120.160
5	25	Ken Schrader	Hendrick Motorsports	Chevrolet	1:12.857	119.972
6	9	Bill Elliott	Melling Racing	Ford	1:12.898	119.905
7	17	Darrell Waltrip	Hendrick Motorsports	Chevrolet	1:12.976	119.776
8	26	Ricky Rudd	King Racing	Buick	1:13.201	119.408
9	8	Bobby Hillin Jr.	Stavola Brothers Racing	Buick	1:13.256	119.319
10	7	Alan Kulwicki	AK Racing	Ford	1:13.350	119.166
11	6	Mark Martin	Roush Racing	Ford	1:13.448	119.007
12	10	Derrike Cope	Whitcomb Racing	Pontiac	1:13.535	118.866
13	27	Rusty Wallace	Blue Max Racing	Pontiac	1:13.631	118.711
14	29	Dale Jarrett	Cale Yarborough Motorsports	Pontiac	1:13.708	118.587
15	15	Brett Bodine	Bud Moore Engineering	Ford	1:13.714	118.577
16	18	Tommy Kendall	Hendrick Motorsports	Chevrolet	1:13.783	118.463
17	38	Dick Johnson	Dick Johnson Racing	Ford	1:13.885	118.306
18	94	Sterling Marlin	Hagan Racing	Oldsmobile	1:13.927	118.236
19	55	Phil Parsons	Jackson Bros. Motorsports	Oldsmobile	1:13.999	118.121
Failed to lock in Round 1
20	30	Michael Waltrip	Bahari Racing	Pontiac	1:13.545	118.850
21	28	Davey Allison	Robert Yates Racing	Ford	1:14.108	117.947
22	2	Ernie Irvan	U.S. Racing	Pontiac	1:14.206	117.791
23	21	Neil Bonnett	Wood Brothers Racing	Ford	1:14.218	117.772
24	4	Rick Wilson	Morgan–McClure Motorsports	Oldsmobile	1:14.267	117.694
25	43	Richard Petty	Petty Enterprises	Pontiac	1:14.352	117.560
26	16	Larry Pearson (R)	Pearson Racing	Buick	1:14.392	117.497
27	44	Jim Sauter	Group 44	Pontiac	1:14.405	117.476
28	33	Harry Gant	Jackson Bros. Motorsports	Oldsmobile	1:14.583	117.196
29	40	Darin Brassfield	Brassfield Racing	Chevrolet	1:14.758	116.921
30	71	Dave Marcis	Marcis Auto Racing	Chevrolet	1:14.860	116.762
31	84	Dick Trickle (R)	Stavola Brothers Racing	Buick	1:15.344	116.012
32	57	Hut Stricklin (R)	Osterlund Racing	Pontiac	1:15.630	115.573
33	52	Jimmy Means	Jimmy Means Racing	Pontiac	1:15.812	115.296
34	14	A. J. Foyt	A. J. Foyt Racing	Oldsmobile	1:16.001	115.009
35	88	Jimmy Spencer (R)	Baker–Schiff Racing	Pontiac	1:16.558	114.172
36	70	J. D. McDuffie	McDuffie Racing	Pontiac	1:16.645	114.043
37	90	Stan Barrett	Donlavey Racing	Ford	1:18.383	111.514
38	13	Oma Kimbrough	Rosenblum Racing	Chevrolet	1:18.699	111.066
39	41	Ted Thomas	T&O Racing	Ford	1:19.756	109.596
To the rear
40	83	Eddie Bierschwale	Speed Racing	Oldsmobile	1:13.785	118.785
Failed to qualify
41	04	Tom Rotsell	Hakes Racing	Ford	1:20.596	108.452
Official first round qualifying results
Official starting lineup

== Race results ==
Fin	St	#	Driver	Team	Make	Laps	Led	Status	Pts	Winnings
1	13	27	Rusty Wallace	Blue Max Racing	Pontiac	90	20	running	180	$56,400
2	11	6	Mark Martin	Roush Racing	Ford	90	0	running	170	$32,550
3	4	3	Dale Earnhardt	Richard Childress Racing	Chevrolet	90	21	running	170	$38,140
4	21	28	Davey Allison	Robert Yates Racing	Ford	90	0	running	160	$21,005
5	9	8	Bobby Hillin Jr.	Stavola Brothers Racing	Buick	90	2	running	160	$16,690
6	1	75	Morgan Shepherd	RahMoc Enterprises	Pontiac	90	22	running	160	$18,375
7	18	94	Sterling Marlin	Hagan Racing	Oldsmobile	90	0	running	146	$10,780
8	24	4	Rick Wilson	Morgan–McClure Motorsports	Oldsmobile	90	0	running	142	$9,970
9	27	44	Jim Sauter	Group 44	Pontiac	90	0	running	138	$5,390
10	20	30	Michael Waltrip	Bahari Racing	Pontiac	90	6	running	139	$11,925
11	26	16	Larry Pearson (R)	Pearson Racing	Buick	90	0	running	130	$7,040
12	29	40	Darin Brassfield	Brassfield Racing	Chevrolet	90	0	running	127	$5,707
13	25	43	Richard Petty	Petty Enterprises	Pontiac	90	0	running	124	$5,760
14	3	11	Terry Labonte	Junior Johnson & Associates	Ford	90	1	running	126	$12,970
15	15	15	Brett Bodine	Bud Moore Engineering	Ford	90	0	running	118	$7,830
16	7	17	Darrell Waltrip	Hendrick Motorsports	Chevrolet	90	0	running	115	$12,010
17	19	55	Phil Parsons	Jackson Bros. Motorsports	Oldsmobile	90	0	running	112	$6,590
18	6	9	Bill Elliott	Melling Racing	Ford	90	0	running	109	$14,120
19	28	33	Harry Gant	Jackson Bros. Motorsports	Oldsmobile	90	0	running	106	$10,015
20	5	25	Ken Schrader	Hendrick Motorsports	Chevrolet	89	5	running	108	$10,745
21	2	5	Geoff Bodine	Hendrick Motorsports	Chevrolet	88	0	crash	100	$9,695
22	32	57	Hut Stricklin (R)	Osterlund Racing	Pontiac	88	0	running	97	$3,925
23	14	29	Dale Jarrett	Cale Yarborough Motorsports	Pontiac	87	0	engine	94	$5,480
24	22	2	Ernie Irvan	U.S. Racing	Pontiac	87	0	running	91	$3,370
25	30	71	Dave Marcis	Marcis Auto Racing	Chevrolet	87	0	running	88	$5,460
26	37	90	Stan Barrett	Donlavey Racing	Ford	86	0	running	85	$2,325
27	16	18	Tommy Kendall	Hendrick Motorsports	Chevrolet	79	1	crash	0	$3,015
28	35	88	Jimmy Spencer (R)	Baker–Schiff Racing	Pontiac	72	0	transmission	79	$4,955
29	8	26	Ricky Rudd	King Racing	Buick	69	12	engine	81	$9,145
30	38	13	Oma Kimbrough	Rosenblum Racing	Chevrolet	64	0	clutch	73	$2,135
31	39	41	Ted Thomas	T&O Racing	Ford	55	0	ignition	70	$1,975
32	17	38	Dick Johnson	Dick Johnson Racing	Ford	54	0	crash	67	$1,910
33	33	52	Jimmy Means	Jimmy Means Racing	Pontiac	47	0	transmission	64	$1,850
34	31	84	Dick Trickle (R)	Stavola Brothers Racing	Buick	33	0	valve	61	$4,490
35	36	70	J. D. McDuffie	McDuffie Racing	Pontiac	28	0	engine	58	$1,755
36	23	21	Neil Bonnett	Wood Brothers Racing	Ford	22	0	transmission	55	$4,345
37	34	14	A. J. Foyt	A. J. Foyt Racing	Oldsmobile	7	0	engine	52	$1,640
38	40	83	Eddie Bierschwale	Speed Racing	Oldsmobile	6	0	quit	49	$4,260
39	10	7	Alan Kulwicki	AK Racing	Ford	5	0	engine	46	$4,205
40	12	10	Derrike Cope	Whitcomb Racing	Pontiac	3	0	engine	43	$2,145
Official race results

== Standings after the race ==
Drivers' Championship standings

	Pos	Driver	Points
	1	Dale Earnhardt	2,614
1	2	Mark Martin	2,488 (–126)
1	3	Darrell Waltrip	2,469 (–145)
1	4	Rusty Wallace	2,459 (–155)
1	5	Bill Elliott	2,394 (–220)
1	6	Davey Allison	2,319 (–295)
1	7	Terry Labonte	2,290 (–324)
	8	Ken Schrader	2,244 (–370)
	9	Sterling Marlin	2,225 (–389)
1	10	Geoff Bodine	2,154 (–460)
Official driver's standings

- Note: Only the first 10 positions are included for the driver standings.

Previous race: 1989 Talladega DieHard 500	NASCAR Winston Cup Series; 1989 season	Next race: 1989 Champion Spark Plug 400
