= 1993 The Bud at The Glen =

19th race of the 1993 NASCAR Winston Cup Series

Race details
- Race 19 of 30 in the 1993 NASCAR Winston Cup Series
- The 1993 The Bud at The Glen program cover.
- Date: August 8, 1993
- Official name: 8th Annual The Bud at The Glen
- Location: Watkins Glen, New York, Watkins Glen International
- Course: Permanent racing facility
- Course length: 2.45 miles (3.943 km)
- Distance: 90 laps, 220.5 mi (354.86 km)
- Scheduled distance: 90 laps, 220.5 mi (354.86 km)
- Average speed: 84.771 miles per hour (136.426 km/h)
- Attendance: 150,000

Pole position
| Driver | Mark Martin | Roush Racing |
- Time: 1:14.044

Most laps led
| Driver | Mark Martin | Roush Racing |
- Laps: 47

Winner
| No. 6 | Mark Martin | Roush Racing |

Television in the United States
- Network: ESPN
- Announcers: Bob Jenkins, Ned Jarrett, Benny Parsons

Radio in the United States
- Radio: Motor Racing Network

The 1993 The Bud at The Glen was the 19th stock car race of the 1993 NASCAR Winston Cup Series season and the eighth iteration of the event. The race was held on Sunday, August 8, 1993, before an audience of 150,000 in Watkins Glen, New York, at the shortened layout of Watkins Glen International, a 2.45-mile (3.94 km) permanent road course layout. The race took the scheduled 90 laps to complete. On the final restart with three to go, Roush Racing driver Mark Martin would manage to climb to the front of the field, climbing back from earlier bad luck in the race to take his eighth career NASCAR Winston Cup Series victory and his first victory of the season. To fill out the top three, Roush Racing driver Wally Dallenbach Jr. and Bobby Allison Motorsports driver Jimmy Spencer would finish second and third, respectively.

== Background ==
The layout of Watkins Glen International NASCAR uses.

Watkins Glen International (nicknamed "The Glen") is an automobile race track located in Watkins Glen, New York at the southern tip of Seneca Lake. It was long known around the world as the home of the Formula One United States Grand Prix, which it hosted for twenty consecutive years (1961–1980), but the site has been home to road racing of nearly every class, including the World Sportscar Championship, Trans-Am, Can-Am, NASCAR Sprint Cup Series, the International Motor Sports Association and the IndyCar Series.

Initially, public roads in the village were used for the race course. In 1956 a permanent circuit for the race was built. In 1968 the race was extended to six hours, becoming the 6 Hours of Watkins Glen. The circuit's current layout has more or less been the same since 1971, although a chicane was installed at the uphill Esses in 1975 to slow cars through these corners, where there was a fatality during practice at the 1973 United States Grand Prix. The chicane was removed in 1985, but another chicane called the "Inner Loop" was installed in 1992 after J. D. McDuffie's fatal accident during the previous year's NASCAR Winston Cup event.

The circuit is known as the Mecca of North American road racing and is a very popular venue among fans and drivers. The facility is currently owned by NASCAR.

=== Entry list ===
- (R) denotes rookie driver.

| # | Driver | Team | Make |
|---|---|---|---|
| 1 | Rick Mast | Precision Products Racing | Ford |
| 2 | Rusty Wallace | Penske Racing South | Pontiac |
| 3 | Dale Earnhardt | Richard Childress Racing | Chevrolet |
| 4 | Ernie Irvan | Morgan–McClure Motorsports | Chevrolet |
| 5 | Ricky Rudd | Hendrick Motorsports | Chevrolet |
| 05 | Ed Ferree | Ferree Racing | Chevrolet |
| 6 | Mark Martin | Roush Racing | Ford |
| 7 | Tommy Kendall | AK Racing | Ford |
| 8 | Sterling Marlin | Stavola Brothers Racing | Ford |
| 9 | P. J. Jones (R) | Melling Racing | Ford |
| 11 | Bill Elliott | Junior Johnson & Associates | Ford |
| 12 | Jimmy Spencer | Bobby Allison Motorsports | Ford |
| 14 | Terry Labonte | Hagan Racing | Chevrolet |
| 15 | Geoff Bodine | Bud Moore Engineering | Ford |
| 16 | Wally Dallenbach Jr. | Roush Racing | Ford |
| 17 | Darrell Waltrip | Darrell Waltrip Motorsports | Chevrolet |
| 18 | Dale Jarrett | Joe Gibbs Racing | Chevrolet |
| 21 | Morgan Shepherd | Wood Brothers Racing | Ford |
| 22 | Bobby Labonte (R) | Bill Davis Racing | Ford |
| 24 | Jeff Gordon (R) | Hendrick Motorsports | Chevrolet |
| 25 | Ken Schrader | Hendrick Motorsports | Chevrolet |
| 26 | Brett Bodine | King Racing | Ford |
| 27 | Hut Stricklin | Junior Johnson & Associates | Ford |
| 28 | Lake Speed | Robert Yates Racing | Ford |
| 29 | Oma Kimbrough | Linro Motorsports | Chevrolet |
| 30 | Michael Waltrip | Bahari Racing | Pontiac |
| 33 | Harry Gant | Leo Jackson Motorsports | Chevrolet |
| 39 | Scott Lagasse | Roulo Brothers Racing | Chevrolet |
| 40 | Kenny Wallace (R) | SABCO Racing | Pontiac |
| 41 | Phil Parsons | Larry Hedrick Motorsports | Chevrolet |
| 42 | Kyle Petty | SABCO Racing | Pontiac |
| 44 | Rick Wilson | Petty Enterprises | Pontiac |
| 52 | Scott Gaylord | Jimmy Means Racing | Oldsmobile |
| 55 | Ted Musgrave | RaDiUs Motorsports | Ford |
| 61 | Davy Jones* | Bill Stroppe Motorsports | Ford |
| 65 | Jerry O'Neil | O'Neil Racing | Oldsmobile |
| 68 | Dorsey Schroeder | TriStar Motorsports | Ford |
| 71 | Dave Marcis | Marcis Auto Racing | Chevrolet |
| 75 | Todd Bodine (R) | Butch Mock Motorsports | Ford |
| 81 | Jeff Davis | Jeff Davis Racing | Ford |
| 87 | Joe Nemechek | NEMCO Motorsports | Chevrolet |
| 90 | Bobby Hillin Jr. | Donlavey Racing | Ford |
| 98 | Derrike Cope | Cale Yarborough Motorsports | Ford |

*Withdrew due to a lack of preparation for the race.

== Qualifying ==
Qualifying was split into two rounds. The first round was held on Friday, August 6, at 3:00 PM EST. Each driver would have one lap to set a time. During the first round, the top 20 drivers in the round would be guaranteed a starting spot in the race. If a driver was not able to guarantee a spot in the first round, they had the option to scrub their time from the first round and try and run a faster lap time in a second round qualifying run, held on Saturday, August 7, at 11:00 AM EST. As with the first round, each driver would have one lap to set a time. For this specific race, positions 21-38 would be decided on time, and depending on who needed it, a select amount of positions were given to cars who had not otherwise qualified but were high enough in owner's points; up to two provisionals were given. If needed, a past champion who did not qualify on either time or provisionals could use a champion's provisional, adding one more spot to the field.

Mark Martin, driving for Roush Racing, would win the pole, setting a time of 1:14.044 and an average speed of 119.118 mph (191.702 km/h) in the first round.

Four drivers would fail to qualify.

=== Full qualifying results ===
| Pos. | # | Driver | Team | Make | Time | Speed |
|---|---|---|---|---|---|---|
| 1 | 6 | Mark Martin | Roush Racing | Ford | 1:14.044 | 119.118 |
| 2 | 25 | Ken Schrader | Hendrick Motorsports | Chevrolet | 1:14.780 | 117.946 |
| 3 | 14 | Terry Labonte | Hagan Racing | Chevrolet | 1:14.814 | 117.892 |
| 4 | 28 | Lake Speed | Robert Yates Racing | Ford | 1:14.901 | 117.755 |
| 5 | 3 | Dale Earnhardt | Richard Childress Racing | Chevrolet | 1:15.078 | 117.478 |
| 6 | 2 | Rusty Wallace | Penske Racing South | Pontiac | 1:15.089 | 117.461 |
| 7 | 42 | Kyle Petty | SABCO Racing | Pontiac | 1:15.265 | 117.186 |
| 8 | 11 | Bill Elliott | Junior Johnson & Associates | Ford | 1:15.303 | 117.127 |
| 9 | 5 | Ricky Rudd | Hendrick Motorsports | Chevrolet | 1:15.373 | 117.018 |
| 10 | 16 | Wally Dallenbach Jr. | Roush Racing | Ford | 1:15.401 | 116.975 |
| 11 | 24 | Jeff Gordon (R) | Hendrick Motorsports | Chevrolet | 1:15.425 | 116.937 |
| 12 | 4 | Ernie Irvan | Morgan–McClure Motorsports | Chevrolet | 1:15.488 | 116.840 |
| 13 | 87 | Joe Nemechek | NEMCO Motorsports | Chevrolet | 1:15.606 | 116.657 |
| 14 | 18 | Dale Jarrett | Joe Gibbs Racing | Chevrolet | 1:15.627 | 116.625 |
| 15 | 98 | Derrike Cope | Cale Yarborough Motorsports | Ford | 1:15.684 | 116.537 |
| 16 | 15 | Geoff Bodine | Bud Moore Engineering | Ford | 1:15.735 | 116.459 |
| 17 | 90 | Bobby Hillin Jr. | Donlavey Racing | Ford | 1:16.024 | 116.016 |
| 18 | 33 | Harry Gant | Leo Jackson Motorsports | Chevrolet | 1:16.104 | 115.894 |
| 19 | 40 | Kenny Wallace (R) | SABCO Racing | Pontiac | 1:16.237 | 115.692 |
| 20 | 41 | Phil Parsons | Larry Hedrick Motorsports | Chevrolet | 1:16.289 | 115.613 |
Failed to lock in Round 1
| 21 | 68 | Dorsey Schroeder | TriStar Motorsports | Ford | 1:16.326 | 115.557 |
| 22 | 21 | Morgan Shepherd | Wood Brothers Racing | Ford | 1:16.348 | 115.524 |
| 23 | 44 | Rick Wilson | Petty Enterprises | Pontiac | 1:16.360 | 115.506 |
| 24 | 22 | Bobby Labonte (R) | Bill Davis Racing | Ford | 1:16.374 | 115.484 |
| 25 | 17 | Darrell Waltrip | Darrell Waltrip Motorsports | Chevrolet | 1:16.378 | 115.478 |
| 26 | 30 | Michael Waltrip | Bahari Racing | Pontiac | 1:16.397 | 115.450 |
| 27 | 26 | Brett Bodine | King Racing | Ford | 1:16.408 | 115.433 |
| 28 | 39 | Scott Lagasse | Roulo Brothers Racing | Chevrolet | 1:16.574 | 115.183 |
| 29 | 9 | P. J. Jones (R) | Melling Racing | Ford | 1:16.597 | 115.148 |
| 30 | 8 | Sterling Marlin | Stavola Brothers Racing | Ford | 1:16.742 | 114.931 |
| 31 | 1 | Rick Mast | Precision Products Racing | Ford | 1:16.847 | 114.774 |
| 32 | 12 | Jimmy Spencer | Bobby Allison Motorsports | Ford | 1:16.938 | 114.638 |
| 33 | 7 | Tommy Kendall | AK Racing | Ford | 1:17.067 | 114.446 |
| 34 | 75 | Todd Bodine (R) | Butch Mock Motorsports | Ford | 1:17.159 | 114.309 |
| 35 | 05 | Ed Ferree | Ferree Racing | Chevrolet | 1:17.262 | 114.157 |
| 36 | 55 | Ted Musgrave | RaDiUs Motorsports | Ford | 1:17.274 | 114.139 |
| 37 | 27 | Hut Stricklin | Junior Johnson & Associates | Ford | 1:17.293 | 114.111 |
| 38 | 52 | Scott Gaylord | Jimmy Means Racing | Oldsmobile | 1:17.474 | 113.845 |
Failed to qualify
| 39 | 71 | Dave Marcis | Marcis Auto Racing | Chevrolet | 1:17.611 | 113.644 |
| 40 | 65 | Jerry O'Neil | O'Neil Racing | Oldsmobile | 1:19.641 | 110.747 |
| 41 | 29 | Oma Kimbrough | Linro Motorsports | Chevrolet | 1:20.895 | 109.030 |
| 42 | 81 | Jeff Davis | Jeff Davis Racing | Ford | 1:33.446 | 94.386 |
| WD | 61 | Davy Jones | Bill Stroppe Motorsports | Ford | - | - |
Official first round qualifying results
Official starting lineup

== Race results ==
| Fin | St | # | Driver | Team | Make | Laps | Led | Status | Pts | Winnings |
|---|---|---|---|---|---|---|---|---|---|---|
| 1 | 1 | 6 | Mark Martin | Roush Racing | Ford | 90 | 47 | running | 185 | $166,110 |
| 2 | 10 | 16 | Wally Dallenbach Jr. | Roush Racing | Ford | 90 | 0 | running | 170 | $37,045 |
| 3 | 32 | 12 | Jimmy Spencer | Bobby Allison Motorsports | Ford | 90 | 0 | running | 165 | $31,135 |
| 4 | 8 | 11 | Bill Elliott | Junior Johnson & Associates | Ford | 90 | 0 | running | 160 | $28,075 |
| 5 | 2 | 25 | Ken Schrader | Hendrick Motorsports | Chevrolet | 90 | 0 | running | 155 | $24,655 |
| 6 | 30 | 8 | Sterling Marlin | Stavola Brothers Racing | Ford | 90 | 0 | running | 150 | $18,190 |
| 7 | 24 | 22 | Bobby Labonte (R) | Bill Davis Racing | Ford | 90 | 0 | running | 146 | $14,670 |
| 8 | 29 | 9 | P. J. Jones (R) | Melling Racing | Ford | 90 | 0 | running | 142 | $10,460 |
| 9 | 19 | 40 | Kenny Wallace (R) | SABCO Racing | Pontiac | 90 | 0 | running | 138 | $12,210 |
| 10 | 18 | 33 | Harry Gant | Leo Jackson Motorsports | Chevrolet | 90 | 0 | running | 134 | $19,990 |
| 11 | 15 | 98 | Derrike Cope | Cale Yarborough Motorsports | Ford | 90 | 0 | running | 130 | $13,930 |
| 12 | 26 | 30 | Michael Waltrip | Bahari Racing | Pontiac | 90 | 0 | running | 127 | $13,490 |
| 13 | 28 | 39 | Scott Lagasse | Roulo Brothers Racing | Chevrolet | 90 | 0 | running | 124 | $7,800 |
| 14 | 25 | 17 | Darrell Waltrip | Darrell Waltrip Motorsports | Chevrolet | 90 | 0 | running | 121 | $17,360 |
| 15 | 12 | 4 | Ernie Irvan | Morgan–McClure Motorsports | Chevrolet | 90 | 0 | running | 118 | $17,420 |
| 16 | 16 | 15 | Geoff Bodine | Bud Moore Engineering | Ford | 90 | 8 | running | 120 | $15,250 |
| 17 | 37 | 27 | Hut Stricklin | Junior Johnson & Associates | Ford | 90 | 0 | running | 112 | $12,330 |
| 18 | 5 | 3 | Dale Earnhardt | Richard Childress Racing | Chevrolet | 90 | 26 | running | 114 | $13,510 |
| 19 | 6 | 2 | Rusty Wallace | Penske Racing South | Pontiac | 90 | 0 | running | 106 | $16,105 |
| 20 | 27 | 26 | Brett Bodine | King Racing | Ford | 89 | 0 | running | 103 | $12,210 |
| 21 | 13 | 87 | Joe Nemechek | NEMCO Motorsports | Chevrolet | 89 | 0 | running | 100 | $6,535 |
| 22 | 23 | 44 | Rick Wilson | Petty Enterprises | Pontiac | 89 | 0 | running | 97 | $8,265 |
| 23 | 3 | 14 | Terry Labonte | Hagan Racing | Chevrolet | 88 | 0 | running | 94 | $11,070 |
| 24 | 9 | 5 | Ricky Rudd | Hendrick Motorsports | Chevrolet | 87 | 0 | running | 91 | $10,910 |
| 25 | 33 | 7 | Tommy Kendall | AK Racing | Ford | 85 | 0 | running | 88 | $15,625 |
| 26 | 7 | 42 | Kyle Petty | SABCO Racing | Pontiac | 84 | 9 | crash | 90 | $15,165 |
| 27 | 4 | 28 | Lake Speed | Robert Yates Racing | Ford | 79 | 0 | running | 82 | $17,055 |
| 28 | 22 | 21 | Morgan Shepherd | Wood Brothers Racing | Ford | 76 | 0 | running | 79 | $10,595 |
| 29 | 38 | 52 | Scott Gaylord | Jimmy Means Racing | Oldsmobile | 75 | 0 | running | 76 | $5,935 |
| 30 | 34 | 75 | Todd Bodine (R) | Butch Mock Motorsports | Ford | 67 | 0 | oil leak | 73 | $5,875 |
| 31 | 11 | 24 | Jeff Gordon (R) | Hendrick Motorsports | Chevrolet | 64 | 0 | engine | 70 | $7,290 |
| 32 | 14 | 18 | Dale Jarrett | Joe Gibbs Racing | Chevrolet | 61 | 0 | clutch | 67 | $13,650 |
| 33 | 20 | 41 | Phil Parsons | Larry Hedrick Motorsports | Chevrolet | 57 | 0 | crash | 64 | $7,140 |
| 34 | 36 | 55 | Ted Musgrave | RaDiUs Motorsports | Ford | 51 | 0 | transmission | 61 | $10,055 |
| 35 | 17 | 90 | Bobby Hillin Jr. | Donlavey Racing | Ford | 42 | 0 | engine | 58 | $5,470 |
| 36 | 35 | 05 | Ed Ferree | Ferree Racing | Chevrolet | 36 | 0 | crash | 55 | $5,440 |
| 37 | 31 | 1 | Rick Mast | Precision Products Racing | Ford | 6 | 0 | crash | 52 | $9,885 |
| 38 | 21 | 68 | Dorsey Schroeder | TriStar Motorsports | Ford | 0 | 0 | crash | 49 | $5,350 |
Official race results

== Standings after the race ==
Drivers' Championship standings

| | Pos | Driver | Points |
|---|---|---|---|
| | 1 | Dale Earnhardt | 2,911 |
| | 2 | Dale Jarrett | 2,630 (–281) |
| | 3 | Rusty Wallace | 2,570 (–341) |
| 1 | 4 | Mark Martin | 2,527 (–384) |
| 1 | 5 | Morgan Shepherd | 2,502 (–409) |
| | 6 | Kyle Petty | 2,430 (–481) |
| 1 | 7 | Ken Schrader | 2,403 (–508) |
| 1 | 8 | Ernie Irvan | 2,375 (–536) |
| | 9 | Geoff Bodine | 2,334 (–577) |
| | 10 | Jeff Gordon | 2,253 (–658) |
Official driver's standings

- Note: Only the first 10 positions are included for the driver standings.

| Previous race: 1993 DieHard 500 | NASCAR Winston Cup Series; 1993 season | Next race: 1993 Champion Spark Plug 400 |
