= 1993 DieHard 500 =

18th race of the 1993 NASCAR Winston Cup Series

Coordinates: 33.567°N 86.066°W

Race details
- Race 18 of 30 in the 1993 NASCAR Winston Cup Series
- The 1993 DieHard 500 program cover, featuring Ernie Irvan.
- Date: July 25, 1993
- Official name: 25th Annual DieHard 500
- Location: Lincoln, Alabama, Talladega Superspeedway
- Course: Permanent racing facility
- Course length: 2.66 miles (4.281 km)
- Distance: 188 laps, 500.08 mi (804.801 km)
- Average speed: 153.858 miles per hour (247.610 km/h)
- Attendance: 100,000

Pole position
Driver	Bill Elliott	Junior Johnson & Associates
- Time: 49.772

Most laps led
Driver	Dale Earnhardt	Richard Childress Racing
- Laps: 59

Winner
No. 3	Dale Earnhardt	Richard Childress Racing

Television in the United States
- Network: CBS
- Announcers: Ken Squier, Ned Jarrett, Neil Bonnett

Radio in the United States
- Radio: Motor Racing Network

The 1993 DieHard 500 was the 18th stock car race of the 1993 NASCAR Winston Cup Series season and the 25th iteration of the event. The race was held on Sunday, July 25, 1993, before an audience of 100,000 in Lincoln, Alabama at Talladega Superspeedway, a 2.66 miles (4.28 km) permanent triangle-shaped superspeedway. The race took the scheduled 188 laps to complete. In one of the closest finishes in NASCAR Winston Cup Series history, Richard Childress Racing driver Dale Earnhardt would manage to best out a last-lap challenge against Morgan–McClure Motorsports driver Ernie Irvan by 0.005 seconds at the finish line, with Earnhardt managing to extend his dominant driver's championship lead over the rest of the field with the victory. The victory was Earnhardt's 59th career NASCAR Winston Cup Series victory and his sixth and final victory of the season. To fill out the top three, Roush Racing driver Mark Martin would finish third.

The race was marred by two separate major incidents throughout the race. On lap 70, a five-car incident featured Active Motorsports driver Jimmy Horton flipping over the protective outside wall in turn one, meant to keep cars within the track. While Horton wasn't seriously hurt, in the same accident, owner-driver and Birmingham, Alabama native Stanley Smith would suffer a basilar skull fracture and partial paralysis of the right side of his body after slamming his car into the turn one wall, spilling blood on most of his racing firesuit.

After being taken to a Birmingham hospital, Smith would recover for 40 days until he was eventually discharged. The second major crash would occur on lap 132, when Neil Bonnett's car would go airborne, flip over the damaged car of Ted Musgrave, and smash into the protective catch-fence on the track's front-stretch that was meant to protect spectators. Nine fans would be injured due to the crash. Bonnett, making a one-off appearance since retiring in 1990, was uninjured and would eventually decide to commentate the rest of the race for CBS.

== Background ==
The layout of Talladega Superspeedway, the venue where the race was held.

Talladega Superspeedway, originally known as Alabama International Motor Superspeedway (AIMS), is a motorsports complex located north of Talladega, Alabama. It is located on the former Anniston Air Force Base in the small city of Lincoln. The track is a tri-oval and was constructed in the 1960s by the International Speedway Corporation, a business controlled by the France family. Talladega is most known for its steep banking and the unique location of the start/finish line that's located just past the exit to pit road. The track currently hosts the NASCAR series such as the NASCAR Cup Series, Xfinity Series and the Camping World Truck Series. Talladega is the longest NASCAR oval, a 2.66-mile-long (4.28 km) tri-oval like the Daytona International Speedway, which also is a 2.5-mile-long (4.0 km) tri-oval.

=== Entry list ===
- (R) denotes rookie driver.

#	Driver	Team	Make
1	Rick Mast	Precision Products Racing	Ford
2	Rusty Wallace	Penske Racing South	Pontiac
3	Dale Earnhardt	Richard Childress Racing	Chevrolet
4	Ernie Irvan	Morgan–McClure Motorsports	Chevrolet
5	Ricky Rudd	Hendrick Motorsports	Chevrolet
6	Mark Martin	Roush Racing	Ford
7	Jimmy Hensley	AK Racing	Ford
8	Sterling Marlin	Stavola Brothers Racing	Ford
11	Bill Elliott	Junior Johnson & Associates	Ford
12	Jimmy Spencer	Bobby Allison Motorsports	Ford
14	Terry Labonte	Hagan Racing	Chevrolet
15	Geoff Bodine	Bud Moore Engineering	Ford
16	Wally Dallenbach Jr.	Roush Racing	Ford
17	Darrell Waltrip	Darrell Waltrip Motorsports	Chevrolet
18	Dale Jarrett	Joe Gibbs Racing	Chevrolet
21	Morgan Shepherd	Wood Brothers Racing	Ford
22	Bobby Labonte (R)	Bill Davis Racing	Ford
24	Jeff Gordon (R)	Hendrick Motorsports	Chevrolet
25	Ken Schrader	Hendrick Motorsports	Chevrolet
26	Brett Bodine	King Racing	Ford
27	Hut Stricklin	Junior Johnson & Associates	Ford
28	Robby Gordon	Robert Yates Racing	Ford
29	Kerry Teague	Linro Motorsports	Chevrolet
30	Michael Waltrip	Bahari Racing	Pontiac
31	Neil Bonnett	Richard Childress Racing	Chevrolet
32	Jimmy Horton	Active Motorsports	Chevrolet
33	Harry Gant	Leo Jackson Motorsports	Chevrolet
37	Loy Allen Jr.	TriStar Motorsports	Ford
38	Bobby Hamilton	Akins Motorsports	Ford
40	Kenny Wallace (R)	SABCO Racing	Pontiac
41	Phil Parsons	Larry Hedrick Motorsports	Chevrolet
42	Kyle Petty	SABCO Racing	Pontiac
44	Rick Wilson	Petty Enterprises	Pontiac
45	Rich Bickle	Terminal Trucking Motorsports	Ford
46	Buddy Baker	Hendrick Motorsports	Chevrolet
49	Stanley Smith	BS&S Motorsports	Chevrolet
51	Jeff Purvis	Phoenix Racing	Chevrolet
52	Jimmy Means	Jimmy Means Racing	Ford
53	Ritchie Petty	Petty Brothers Racing	Ford
55	Ted Musgrave	RaDiUs Motorsports	Ford
62	Clay Young	Jimmy Means Racing	Ford
68	Greg Sacks	TriStar Motorsports	Ford
71	Dave Marcis	Marcis Auto Racing	Chevrolet
75	Dick Trickle	Butch Mock Motorsports	Ford
83	Lake Speed	Speed Racing	Ford
90	Bobby Hillin Jr.	Donlavey Racing	Ford
98	Derrike Cope	Cale Yarborough Motorsports	Ford

== Qualifying ==
Qualifying was split into two rounds. The first round was held on Friday, July 22, at 4:00 PM EST. Each driver would have one lap to set a time. During the first round, the top 20 drivers in the round would be guaranteed a starting spot in the race. If a driver was not able to guarantee a spot in the first round, they had the option to scrub their time from the first round and try and run a faster lap time in a second round qualifying run, held on Saturday, July 23, at 11:30 AM EST.

As with the first round, each driver would have one lap to set a time. For this specific race, positions 21-40 would be decided on time, and depending on who needed it, a select amount of positions were given to cars who had not otherwise qualified but were high enough in owner's points; up to two provisionals were given. If needed, a past champion who did not qualify on either time or provisionals could use a champion's provisional, adding one more spot to the field.

Bill Elliott, driving for Junior Johnson & Associates, would win the pole, setting a time of 49.772 and an average speed of 192.397 miles per hour (309.633 km/h) in the first round.

Five drivers would fail to qualify.

=== Full qualifying results ===
Pos.	#	Driver	Team	Make	Time	Speed
1	11	Bill Elliott	Junior Johnson & Associates	Ford	49.772	192.397
2	4	Ernie Irvan	Morgan–McClure Motorsports	Chevrolet	49.782	192.359
3	26	Brett Bodine	King Racing	Ford	49.874	192.004
4	42	Kyle Petty	SABCO Racing	Pontiac	49.993	191.547
5	5	Ricky Rudd	Hendrick Motorsports	Chevrolet	50.039	191.371
6	1	Rick Mast	Precision Products Racing	Ford	50.123	191.050
7	68	Greg Sacks	TriStar Motorsports	Ford	50.135	191.004
8	24	Jeff Gordon (R)	Hendrick Motorsports	Chevrolet	50.180	190.833
9	27	Hut Stricklin	Junior Johnson & Associates	Ford	50.183	190.822
10	44	Rick Wilson	Petty Enterprises	Pontiac	50.184	190.818
11	3	Dale Earnhardt	Richard Childress Racing	Chevrolet	50.213	190.708
12	33	Harry Gant	Leo Jackson Motorsports	Chevrolet	50.228	190.651
13	30	Michael Waltrip	Bahari Racing	Pontiac	50.234	190.628
14	28	Robby Gordon	Robert Yates Racing	Ford	50.238	190.613
15	18	Dale Jarrett	Joe Gibbs Racing	Chevrolet	50.247	190.579
16	17	Darrell Waltrip	Darrell Waltrip Motorsports	Chevrolet	50.289	190.419
17	52	Jimmy Means	Jimmy Means Racing	Ford	50.293	190.404
18	37	Loy Allen Jr.	TriStar Motorsports	Ford	50.339	190.230
19	7	Jimmy Hensley	AK Racing	Ford	50.359	190.155
20	31	Neil Bonnett	Richard Childress Racing	Chevrolet	50.395	190.019
Failed to lock in Round 1
21	55	Ted Musgrave	RaDiUs Motorsports	Ford	50.461	189.770
22	8	Sterling Marlin	Stavola Brothers Racing	Ford	50.546	189.451
23	21	Morgan Shepherd	Wood Brothers Racing	Ford	50.584	189.309
24	32	Jimmy Horton	Active Motorsports	Chevrolet	50.607	189.223
25	6	Mark Martin	Roush Racing	Ford	50.611	189.208
26	16	Wally Dallenbach Jr.	Roush Racing	Ford	50.629	189.141
27	12	Jimmy Spencer	Bobby Allison Motorsports	Ford	50.685	188.932
28	25	Ken Schrader	Hendrick Motorsports	Chevrolet	50.717	188.812
29	90	Bobby Hillin Jr.	Donlavey Racing	Ford	50.723	188.790
30	51	Jeff Purvis	Phoenix Racing	Chevrolet	50.727	188.775
31	98	Derrike Cope	Cale Yarborough Motorsports	Ford	50.759	188.656
32	2	Rusty Wallace	Penske Racing South	Pontiac	50.761	188.649
33	15	Geoff Bodine	Bud Moore Engineering	Ford	50.816	188.445
34	40	Kenny Wallace (R)	SABCO Racing	Pontiac	50.881	188.204
35	49	Stanley Smith	BS&S Motorsports	Chevrolet	50.987	187.813
36	14	Terry Labonte	Hagan Racing	Chevrolet	51.058	187.551
37	41	Phil Parsons	Larry Hedrick Motorsports	Chevrolet	51.068	187.515
38	75	Dick Trickle	Butch Mock Motorsports	Ford	51.072	187.500
39	53	Ritchie Petty	Petty Brothers Racing	Ford	51.135	187.269
40	83	Lake Speed	Speed Racing	Ford	51.207	187.006
Provisionals
41	22	Bobby Labonte (R)	Bill Davis Racing	Ford	51.243	186.874
42	71	Dave Marcis	Marcis Auto Racing	Chevrolet	51.897	184.519
Failed to qualify
43	45	Rich Bickle	Terminal Trucking Motorsports	Ford	-*	-*
44	38	Bobby Hamilton	Akins Motorsports	Ford	-*	-*
45	46	Buddy Baker	Hendrick Motorsports	Chevrolet	-*	-*
46	62	Clay Young	Jimmy Means Racing	Ford	-*	-*
47	29	Kerry Teague	Linro Motorsports	Chevrolet	-*	-*
Official first round qualifying results
Official starting lineup

== Race results ==
Fin	St	#	Driver	Team	Make	Laps	Led	Status	Pts	Winnings
1	11	3	Dale Earnhardt	Richard Childress Racing	Chevrolet	188	59	running	185	$87,315
2	2	4	Ernie Irvan	Morgan–McClure Motorsports	Chevrolet	188	56	running	175	$53,210
3	25	6	Mark Martin	Roush Racing	Ford	188	9	running	170	$40,495
4	4	42	Kyle Petty	SABCO Racing	Pontiac	188	39	running	165	$31,395
5	15	18	Dale Jarrett	Joe Gibbs Racing	Chevrolet	188	5	running	160	$30,390
6	7	68	Greg Sacks	TriStar Motorsports	Ford	188	0	running	150	$17,715
7	23	21	Morgan Shepherd	Wood Brothers Racing	Ford	188	5	running	151	$20,865
8	12	33	Harry Gant	Leo Jackson Motorsports	Chevrolet	188	0	running	142	$21,815
9	3	26	Brett Bodine	King Racing	Ford	188	4	running	143	$18,085
10	26	16	Wally Dallenbach Jr.	Roush Racing	Ford	188	0	running	134	$19,665
11	1	11	Bill Elliott	Junior Johnson & Associates	Ford	188	3	running	135	$25,745
12	9	27	Hut Stricklin	Junior Johnson & Associates	Ford	188	0	running	127	$16,665
13	29	90	Bobby Hillin Jr.	Donlavey Racing	Ford	188	0	running	124	$10,695
14	36	14	Terry Labonte	Hagan Racing	Chevrolet	188	0	running	121	$16,250
15	41	22	Bobby Labonte (R)	Bill Davis Racing	Ford	188	0	running	118	$14,350
16	33	15	Geoff Bodine	Bud Moore Engineering	Ford	188	0	running	115	$18,065
17	32	2	Rusty Wallace	Penske Racing South	Pontiac	188	0	running	112	$17,900
18	40	83	Lake Speed	Speed Racing	Ford	188	0	running	109	$9,795
19	38	75	Dick Trickle	Butch Mock Motorsports	Ford	187	0	running	106	$9,615
20	13	30	Michael Waltrip	Bahari Racing	Pontiac	187	0	running	103	$15,425
21	30	51	Jeff Purvis	Phoenix Racing	Chevrolet	187	0	running	100	$9,195
22	37	41	Phil Parsons	Larry Hedrick Motorsports	Chevrolet	187	0	running	97	$11,265
23	10	44	Rick Wilson	Petty Enterprises	Pontiac	186	0	running	94	$10,885
24	5	5	Ricky Rudd	Hendrick Motorsports	Chevrolet	186	1	running	96	$14,155
25	17	52	Jimmy Means	Jimmy Means Racing	Ford	185	0	running	88	$8,525
26	18	37	Loy Allen Jr.	TriStar Motorsports	Ford	185	0	running	85	$8,450
27	22	8	Sterling Marlin	Stavola Brothers Racing	Ford	183	0	running	82	$13,730
28	19	7	Jimmy Hensley	AK Racing	Ford	182	0	running	79	$17,710
29	42	71	Dave Marcis	Marcis Auto Racing	Chevrolet	179	0	running	76	$8,240
30	27	12	Jimmy Spencer	Bobby Allison Motorsports	Ford	174	0	running	73	$12,920
31	8	24	Jeff Gordon (R)	Hendrick Motorsports	Chevrolet	148	7	engine	75	$11,250
32	28	25	Ken Schrader	Hendrick Motorsports	Chevrolet	143	0	engine	67	$12,630
33	21	55	Ted Musgrave	RaDiUs Motorsports	Ford	132	0	crash	64	$12,535
34	20	31	Neil Bonnett	Richard Childress Racing	Chevrolet	131	0	crash	61	$8,915
35	34	40	Kenny Wallace (R)	SABCO Racing	Pontiac	94	0	handling	58	$9,420
36	31	98	Derrike Cope	Cale Yarborough Motorsports	Ford	90	0	engine	55	$12,360
37	16	17	Darrell Waltrip	Darrell Waltrip Motorsports	Chevrolet	79	0	engine	52	$17,610
38	6	1	Rick Mast	Precision Products Racing	Ford	69	0	crash	49	$12,285
39	24	32	Jimmy Horton	Active Motorsports	Chevrolet	69	0	crash	46	$7,730
40	35	49	Stanley Smith	BS&S Motorsports	Chevrolet	68	0	crash	43	$7,690
41	39	53	Ritchie Petty	Petty Brothers Racing	Ford	68	0	crash	40	$7,665
42	14	28	Robby Gordon	Robert Yates Racing	Ford	55	0	crash	37	$17,665
Official race results

== Media ==
=== Television ===
The Diehard 500 was covered by CBS in the United States. Ken Squier, two-time NASCAR Cup Series champion Ned Jarrett and 1980 race winner Neil Bonnett called the race from the broadcast booth, Bonnett was driving in this race and reported from the car in the race but returned to the booth after his accident. Mike Joy and David Hobbs handled pit road for the television side. This would be the last race Neil Bonnett would call for CBS as he was scheduled to be with CBS for 1994 but was killed practicing for the 1994 Daytona 500. Due to the one hour red flag caused by Bonnett flipping his car and damaging the fence, CBS left during the red flag to air some of their same day coverage of the Tour de France but returned to Talladega to live coverage of the rest of the race.

CBS
Booth announcers		Pit reporters
Lap-by-lap	Color-commentators	Pit reporters
Ken Squier	Ned Jarrett; Neil Bonnett	Mike Joy; David Hobbs

== Standings after the race ==
Drivers' Championship standings

	Pos	Driver	Points
	1	Dale Earnhardt	2,797
	2	Dale Jarrett	2,563 (-234)
	3	Rusty Wallace	2,464 (-333)
	4	Morgan Shepherd	2,423 (–374)
2	5	Mark Martin	2,342 (–455)
	6	Kyle Petty	2,340 (–457)
4	7	Ernie Irvan	2,257 (–540)
3	8	Ken Schrader	2,248 (–549)
1	9	Geoff Bodine	2,214 (–583)
2	10	Jeff Gordon	2,183 (–614)
Official driver's standings

- Note: Only the first 10 positions are included for the driver standings.

Previous race: 1993 Miller Genuine Draft 500	NASCAR Winston Cup Series; 1993 season	Next race: 1993 The Bud at The Glen
