= Kerry Teague =

American stock car racing driver (1961–2021)

- Born: Kerry Wayne Teague; January 12, 1961; Concord, North Carolina, U.S.
- Died: September 11, 2021 (age 60)

NASCAR Cup Series career
- 5 races run over 6 years
- Best finish: 57th (1993)
- First race: 1991 Mello Yello 500 (Charlotte)
- Last race: 1993 Miller Genuine Draft 500 (Pocono)
Wins	Top tens	Poles
0	0	0

NASCAR FedEx Freight Truck Series career
- 12 races run over 1 year
- Best finish: 22nd (1995)
- First race: 1995 Skoal Bandit Copper World Classic (Phoenix)
- Last race: 1995 Stevens Beil/Genuine Car Parts 150 (Flemington)
Wins	Top tens	Poles
0	0	0

Kerry Wayne Teague (January 12, 1961 – September 11, 2021) was an American stock car racing driver. He competed in NASCAR competition in the Winston Cup Series and SuperTruck Series.

== Career ==
Teague competed in the short-lived Sportsman Series in the early 1990s, scoring several wins, including at Charlotte Motor Speedway in 1990. That year, Teague also attempted to make his debut in the Winston Cup Series, failing to qualify in three attempts; he qualified for his first race the following year, finishing 37th at Charlotte Motor Speedway in the No. 95 Sadler Brothers Racing Oldsmobile. Teague began the 1992 season driving for Team USA and Junie Donlavey, but left the team partway through the season, stating he lacked the experience to compete at the Cup level. In 1993, Teague ran his final two Cup races; he attempted events in 1994 and 1995, but failed to qualify for any of them.

In 1995, Teague began competing in the inaugural SuperTruck Series season, but in the twelfth race of the season was involved in a severe accident at Heartland Park Topeka due to a stuck throttle. Suffering head injuries in the accident, Teague ran one additional race in the series later that season at Flemington Speedway, but never competed in another NASCAR race afterwards despite fully recovering.

== Motorsports career results ==
=== NASCAR ===
(key) (Bold - Pole position awarded by qualifying time. Italics - Pole position earned by points standings or practice time. * – Most laps led.)

==== Winston Cup Series ====
NASCAR Winston Cup Series results
Year	Team	No.	Make	1	2	3	4	5	6	7	8	9	10	11	12	13	14	15	16	17	18	19	20	21	22	23	24	25	26	27	28	29	30	31	NWCC	Pts	Ref
1990	Rosenblum-Linro Racing	13	Buick	DAY	RCH	CAR	ATL	DAR	BRI	NWS	MAR	TAL	CLT	DOV	SON	POC	MCH	DAY	POC	TAL	GLN	MCH	BRI	DAR	RCH; DNQ	DOV; DNQ	MAR	NWS	CLT; DNQ	CAR	PHO	ATL			NA	0	
1991	Linro Motorsports	29	Buick	DAY	RCH	CAR	ATL	DAR	BRI	NWS	MAR	TAL	CLT; DNQ	DOV	SON	POC	MCH																		85th	52	
1991	Sadler Brothers Racing	95	Chevy															DAY; DNQ	POC	TAL	GLN	MCH	BRI	DAR	RCH	DOV	MAR	NWS							85th	52	
1991	Sadler Brothers Racing	95	Olds																										CLT; 37	CAR	PHO				85th	52	
1991	Linro Motorsports	13	Buick																													ATL; DNQ			85th	52	
1992	KT Motorsports	03	Olds	DAY; 33	CAR	RCH	ATL																												67th	113	
1992	Donlavey Racing	90	Ford					DAR; 38	BRI	NWS	MAR	TAL	CLT	DOV	SON	POC	MCH	DAY	POC	TAL	GLN	MCH	BRI	DAR	RCH	DOV	MAR	NWS	CLT	CAR	PHO				67th	113	
1992	Donlavey Racing	91	Ford																													ATL; DNQ			67th	113	
1993	Linro Motorsports	29	Chevy	DAY; DNQ	CAR	RCH	ATL	DAR	BRI	NWS	MAR	TAL	SON	CLT	DOV	POC; 26	MCH	DAY; DNQ	NHA	POC; 34	TAL; DNQ	GLN; DNQ	MCH	BRI	DAR	RCH	DOV	MAR	NWS	CLT	CAR	PHO	ATL		57th	146	
1994	KT Motorsports	74	Chevy	DAY; DNQ	CAR	RCH	ATL	DAR	BRI	NWS	MAR	TAL	SON	CLT	DOV	POC	MCH	DAY	NHA	POC	TAL														NA	0	
1994	Linro Motorsports	13	Chevy																			IND; DNQ	GLN	MCH	BRI	DAR	RCH	DOV	MAR	NWS	CLT	CAR	PHO	ATL	NA	0	
1995	Linro Motorsports	51	Chevy	DAY; DNQ	CAR	RCH	ATL	DAR	BRI	NWS	MAR	TAL	SON	CLT	DOV	POC	MCH	DAY	NHA	POC	TAL	IND	GLN	MCH	BRI	DAR	RCH	DOV	MAR	NWS	CLT	CAR	PHO	ATL	NA	0	

===== Daytona 500 =====
Year	Team	Manufacturer	Start	Finish
1992	KT Motorsports	Oldsmobile	21	33
1993	Linro Motorsports	Chevrolet	DNQ	
1994	KT Motorsports	Chevrolet	DNQ	
1995	Linro Motorsports	Chevrolet	DNQ	

==== Busch Series ====
NASCAR Busch Series results
Year	Team	No.	Make	1	2	3	4	5	6	7	8	9	10	11	12	13	14	15	16	17	18	19	20	21	22	23	24	25	26	27	28	NBGNC	Pts	Ref
1994	Info not available			DAY; DNQ	CAR	RCH; DNQ	ATL; DNQ	MAR; DNQ	DAR	HCY	BRI	ROU	NHA	NZH	CLT	DOV	MYB	GLN	MLW	SBO	TAL	HCY	IRP	MCH	BRI	DAR	RCH	DOV	CLT	MAR	CAR	NA	0	

==== SuperTruck Series ====
NASCAR SuperTruck Series results
Year	Team	No.	Make	1	2	3	4	5	6	7	8	9	10	11	12	13	14	15	16	17	18	19	20	NSTSC	Pts	Ref
1995	Rosenblum Racing	51	Chevy	PHO; 19	TUS; 13	SGS; 20	MMR; 17	POR; 25	EVG; 19	I70; 17	LVL	BRI; 13	MLW; 27	CNS; 23	HPT; 30	IRP	FLM; 22	RCH	MAR	NWS	SON	MMR	PHO	22nd	1221	
