= 1989 Champion Spark Plug 400 =

19th race of the 1989 NASCAR Winston Cup Series

Race details
- Race 19 of 29 in the 1989 NASCAR Winston Cup Series
- The 1989 Champion Spark Plug 400 program cover.
- Date: August 20, 1989
- Official name: 20th Annual Champion Spark Plug 400
- Location: Brooklyn, Michigan, Michigan International Speedway
- Course: Permanent racing facility
- Course length: 2 miles (3.2 km)
- Distance: 200 laps, 400 mi (643.737 km)
- Scheduled distance: 200 laps, 400 mi (643.737 km)
- Average speed: 157.704 miles per hour (253.800 km/h)
- Attendance: 80,000

Pole position
Driver	Geoff Bodine	Hendrick Motorsports
- Time: 40.968

Most laps led
Driver	Rusty Wallace	Blue Max Racing
- Laps: 162

Winner
No. 27	Rusty Wallace	Blue Max Racing

Television in the United States
- Network: ESPN
- Announcers: Bob Jenkins, Ned Jarrett, Benny Parsons

Radio in the United States
- Radio: Motor Racing Network

The 1989 Champion Spark Plug 400 was the 19th stock car race of the 1989 NASCAR Winston Cup Series season and the 20th iteration of the event. The race was held on Sunday, August 20, 1989, before an audience of 80,000 in Brooklyn, Michigan, at Michigan International Speedway, a two-mile (3.2 km) moderate-banked D-shaped speedway. The race took the scheduled 200 laps to complete. At race's end, Blue Max Racing driver Rusty Wallace would manage to dominate a majority of the race, leading 162 laps en route to his 15th career NASCAR Winston Cup Series victory and his fifth victory of the season. To fill out the top three, RahMoc Enterprises driver Morgan Shepherd and Jackson Bros. Motorsports driver Harry Gant would finish second and third, respectively.

== Background ==
The layout of Michigan International Speedway, the venue where the race was held.

The race was held at Michigan International Speedway, a two-mile (3.2 km) moderate-banked D-shaped speedway located in Brooklyn, Michigan. The track is used primarily for NASCAR events. It is known as a "sister track" to Texas World Speedway as MIS's oval design was a direct basis of TWS, with moderate modifications to the banking in the corners, and was used as the basis of Auto Club Speedway. The track is owned by International Speedway Corporation. Michigan International Speedway is recognized as one of motorsports' premier facilities because of its wide racing surface and high banking (by open-wheel standards; the 18-degree banking is modest by stock car standards).

=== Entry list ===
- (R) denotes rookie driver.

#	Driver	Team	Make	Sponsor
2	Ernie Irvan	U.S. Racing	Pontiac	Kroger
3	Dale Earnhardt	Richard Childress Racing	Chevrolet	GM Goodwrench Service Plus
4	Rick Wilson	Morgan–McClure Motorsports	Oldsmobile	Kodak
5	Geoff Bodine	Hendrick Motorsports	Chevrolet	Levi Garrett
6	Mark Martin	Roush Racing	Ford	Stroh's Light
7	Alan Kulwicki	AK Racing	Ford	Zerex
8	Bobby Hillin Jr.	Stavola Brothers Racing	Buick	Miller High Life
9	Bill Elliott	Melling Racing	Ford	Coors Light
10	Derrike Cope	Whitcomb Racing	Pontiac	Purolator
11	Terry Labonte	Junior Johnson & Associates	Ford	Budweiser
14	Tracy Leslie	A. J. Foyt Racing	Oldsmobile	Copenhagen
15	Brett Bodine	Bud Moore Engineering	Ford	Motorcraft
16	Larry Pearson (R)	Pearson Racing	Buick	Chattanooga Chew
17	Darrell Waltrip	Hendrick Motorsports	Chevrolet	Tide
18	Rick Jeffrey	TriStar Motorsports	Pontiac	TriStar Motorsports
21	Neil Bonnett	Wood Brothers Racing	Ford	Citgo
23	Eddie Bierschwale	B&B Racing	Oldsmobile	Melling Oil Pumps
25	Ken Schrader	Hendrick Motorsports	Chevrolet	Folgers
26	Ricky Rudd	King Racing	Buick	Quaker State
27	Rusty Wallace	Blue Max Racing	Pontiac	Kodiak
28	Davey Allison	Robert Yates Racing	Ford	Texaco, Havoline
29	Dale Jarrett	Cale Yarborough Motorsports	Pontiac	Hardee's
30	Michael Waltrip	Bahari Racing	Pontiac	Country Time
33	Harry Gant	Jackson Bros. Motorsports	Oldsmobile	Skoal Bandit
38	Dick Johnson	Dick Johnson Racing	Ford	Redkote Steel Tubing
42	Kyle Petty	SABCO Racing	Pontiac	Peak Antifreeze
43	Richard Petty	Petty Enterprises	Pontiac	STP
44	Jim Sauter	Group 44	Pontiac	Group 44
48	Greg Sacks	Winkle Motorsports	Pontiac	Dinner Bell Foods
49	James Hylton	Hylton Motorsports	Buick	Hylton Motorsports
51	Butch Miller	Miller Racing	Chevrolet	Miller Racing
52	Jimmy Means	Jimmy Means Racing	Pontiac	Alka-Seltzer
55	Phil Parsons	Jackson Bros. Motorsports	Oldsmobile	Skoal, Crown Central Petroleum
57	Hut Stricklin (R)	Osterlund Racing	Pontiac	Heinz
71	Dave Marcis	Marcis Auto Racing	Chevrolet	Lifebuoy
75	Morgan Shepherd	RahMoc Enterprises	Pontiac	Valvoline
77	Ken Ragan	Ragan Racing	Ford	Jasper Engines & Transmissions
83	Joe Ruttman	Speed Racing	Oldsmobile	Bull's-Eye Barbecue Sauce
84	Dick Trickle (R)	Stavola Brothers Racing	Buick	Miller High Life
88	Jimmy Spencer (R)	Baker–Schiff Racing	Pontiac	Crisco
90	Chad Little (R)	Donlavey Racing	Ford	Hawaiian Tropic
94	Sterling Marlin	Hagan Racing	Oldsmobile	Sunoco

== Qualifying ==
Qualifying was split into two rounds. The first round was held on Saturday, August 19, at 11:30 AM EST. Each driver would have one lap to set a time. During the first round, the top 20 drivers in the round would be guaranteed a starting spot in the race. If a driver was not able to guarantee a spot in the first round, they had the option to scrub their time from the first round and try and run a faster lap time in a second round qualifying run, held on Saturday, August 19, at 2:00 PM EST. As with the first round, each driver would have one lap to set a time. For this specific race, positions 21-40 would be decided on time, and depending on who needed it, a select amount of positions were given to cars who had not otherwise qualified but were high enough in owner's points; up to two were given.

Geoff Bodine, driving for Hendrick Motorsports, would win the pole, setting a time of 40.968 and an average speed of 175.962 miles per hour (283.183 km/h) in the first round.

Two drivers would fail to qualify.

=== Full qualifying results ===
Pos.	#	Driver	Team	Make	Time	Speed
1	5	Geoff Bodine	Hendrick Motorsports	Chevrolet	40.968	175.962
2	27	Rusty Wallace	Blue Max Racing	Pontiac	41.014	175.336
3	7	Alan Kulwicki	AK Racing	Ford	41.067	175.323
4	6	Mark Martin	Roush Racing	Ford	41.084	175.251
5	4	Rick Wilson	Morgan–McClure Motorsports	Oldsmobile	41.088	175.234
6	25	Ken Schrader	Hendrick Motorsports	Chevrolet	41.190	174.800
7	75	Morgan Shepherd	RahMoc Enterprises	Pontiac	41.198	174.766
8	9	Bill Elliott	Melling Racing	Ford	41.216	174.689
9	42	Kyle Petty	SABCO Racing	Pontiac	41.315	174.271
10	94	Sterling Marlin	Hagan Racing	Oldsmobile	41.333	174.195
11	28	Davey Allison	Robert Yates Racing	Ford	41.378	174.006
12	15	Brett Bodine	Bud Moore Engineering	Ford	41.419	173.833
13	2	Ernie Irvan	U.S. Racing	Pontiac	41.520	173.410
14	11	Terry Labonte	Junior Johnson & Associates	Ford	41.532	173.360
15	3	Dale Earnhardt	Richard Childress Racing	Chevrolet	41.534	173.352
16	26	Ricky Rudd	King Racing	Buick	41.536	173.344
17	43	Richard Petty	Petty Enterprises	Pontiac	41.545	173.306
18	10	Derrike Cope	Whitcomb Racing	Pontiac	41.575	173.181
19	17	Darrell Waltrip	Hendrick Motorsports	Chevrolet	41.613	173.023
20	55	Phil Parsons	Jackson Bros. Motorsports	Oldsmobile	41.692	172.695
Failed to lock in Round 1
21	33	Harry Gant	Jackson Bros. Motorsports	Oldsmobile	41.551	173.281
22	30	Michael Waltrip	Bahari Racing	Pontiac	41.704	172.645
23	83	Joe Ruttman	Speed Racing	Oldsmobile	41.736	172.513
24	90	Chad Little (R)	Donlavey Racing	Ford	41.740	172.496
25	21	Neil Bonnett	Wood Brothers Racing	Ford	41.776	172.348
26	57	Hut Stricklin (R)	Osterlund Racing	Pontiac	41.799	172.253
27	29	Dale Jarrett	Cale Yarborough Motorsports	Pontiac	41.835	172.105
28	48	Greg Sacks	Winkle Motorsports	Pontiac	41.851	172.039
29	88	Jimmy Spencer (R)	Baker–Schiff Racing	Pontiac	41.868	171.969
30	84	Dick Trickle (R)	Stavola Brothers Racing	Buick	41.920	171.756
31	51	Butch Miller	Miller Racing	Chevrolet	41.950	171.633
32	44	Jim Sauter	Group 44	Pontiac	42.009	171.392
33	52	Jimmy Means	Jimmy Means Racing	Pontiac	42.034	171.290
34	8	Bobby Hillin Jr.	Stavola Brothers Racing	Buick	42.038	171.274
35	71	Dave Marcis	Marcis Auto Racing	Chevrolet	42.093	171.050
36	16	Larry Pearson (R)	Pearson Racing	Buick	42.115	170.960
37	18	Rick Jeffrey	TriStar Motorsports	Pontiac	42.154	170.802
38	14	Tracy Leslie	A. J. Foyt Racing	Oldsmobile	42.231	170.491
39	77	Ken Ragan	Ragan Racing	Ford	42.758	168.390
40	23	Eddie Bierschwale	B&B Racing	Oldsmobile	42.869	167.954
Failed to qualify
41	38	Dick Johnson	Dick Johnson Racing	Ford	-*	-*
42	49	James Hylton	Hylton Motorsports	Buick	-*	-*
Official starting lineup

== Race results ==
Fin	St	#	Driver	Team	Make	Laps	Led	Status	Pts	Winnings
1	2	27	Rusty Wallace	Blue Max Racing	Pontiac	200	162	running	185	$67,900
2	7	75	Morgan Shepherd	RahMoc Enterprises	Pontiac	200	7	running	175	$38,975
3	21	33	Harry Gant	Jackson Bros. Motorsports	Oldsmobile	200	4	running	170	$28,425
4	26	57	Hut Stricklin (R)	Osterlund Racing	Pontiac	200	3	running	165	$20,232
5	1	5	Geoff Bodine	Hendrick Motorsports	Chevrolet	200	2	running	160	$23,750
6	18	10	Derrike Cope	Whitcomb Racing	Pontiac	200	1	running	155	$15,375
7	11	28	Davey Allison	Robert Yates Racing	Ford	200	0	running	146	$17,150
8	16	26	Ricky Rudd	King Racing	Buick	200	0	running	142	$15,050
9	4	6	Mark Martin	Roush Racing	Ford	200	2	running	143	$13,075
10	3	7	Alan Kulwicki	AK Racing	Ford	200	9	running	139	$14,700
11	6	25	Ken Schrader	Hendrick Motorsports	Chevrolet	199	3	running	135	$13,400
12	29	88	Jimmy Spencer (R)	Baker–Schiff Racing	Pontiac	199	0	running	127	$10,350
13	9	42	Kyle Petty	SABCO Racing	Pontiac	199	0	running	124	$5,800
14	34	8	Bobby Hillin Jr.	Stavola Brothers Racing	Buick	199	0	running	121	$9,400
15	25	21	Neil Bonnett	Wood Brothers Racing	Ford	198	0	running	118	$9,600
16	36	16	Larry Pearson (R)	Pearson Racing	Buick	198	0	running	115	$6,450
17	15	3	Dale Earnhardt	Richard Childress Racing	Chevrolet	198	0	running	112	$13,450
18	17	43	Richard Petty	Petty Enterprises	Pontiac	198	0	running	109	$5,750
19	30	84	Dick Trickle (R)	Stavola Brothers Racing	Buick	197	0	running	106	$7,350
20	38	14	Tracy Leslie	A. J. Foyt Racing	Oldsmobile	197	0	running	103	$4,875
21	23	83	Joe Ruttman	Speed Racing	Oldsmobile	197	0	running	0	$6,825
22	31	51	Butch Miller	Miller Racing	Chevrolet	197	0	running	97	$3,725
23	32	44	Jim Sauter	Group 44	Pontiac	196	0	running	94	$3,625
24	35	71	Dave Marcis	Marcis Auto Racing	Chevrolet	196	0	running	91	$6,475
25	13	2	Ernie Irvan	U.S. Racing	Pontiac	196	0	running	88	$4,500
26	24	90	Chad Little (R)	Donlavey Racing	Ford	196	0	running	85	$3,325
27	33	52	Jimmy Means	Jimmy Means Racing	Pontiac	195	0	running	82	$3,275
28	40	23	Eddie Bierschwale	B&B Racing	Oldsmobile	194	0	running	79	$3,225
29	39	77	Ken Ragan	Ragan Racing	Ford	193	0	running	76	$3,125
30	37	18	Rick Jeffrey	TriStar Motorsports	Pontiac	191	0	running	73	$3,125
31	22	30	Michael Waltrip	Bahari Racing	Pontiac	190	1	running	75	$5,735
32	5	4	Rick Wilson	Morgan–McClure Motorsports	Oldsmobile	186	0	engine	67	$5,645
33	20	55	Phil Parsons	Jackson Bros. Motorsports	Oldsmobile	177	0	running	64	$5,580
34	10	94	Sterling Marlin	Hagan Racing	Oldsmobile	172	0	running	61	$5,490
35	28	48	Greg Sacks	Winkle Motorsports	Pontiac	158	0	running	58	$2,815
36	12	15	Brett Bodine	Bud Moore Engineering	Ford	128	0	clutch	55	$5,425
37	19	17	Darrell Waltrip	Hendrick Motorsports	Chevrolet	119	6	camshaft	57	$12,115
38	27	29	Dale Jarrett	Cale Yarborough Motorsports	Pontiac	119	0	rear end	49	$5,350
39	8	9	Bill Elliott	Melling Racing	Ford	103	0	engine	46	$13,585
40	14	11	Terry Labonte	Junior Johnson & Associates	Ford	69	0	engine	43	$9,725
Failed to qualify
41		38	Dick Johnson	Dick Johnson Racing	Ford					
42		49	James Hylton	Hylton Motorsports	Buick					
Official race results

== Standings after the race ==
Drivers' Championship standings

	Pos	Driver	Points
	1	Dale Earnhardt	2,726
2	2	Rusty Wallace	2,644 (-82)
1	3	Mark Martin	2,631 (-95)
1	4	Darrell Waltrip	2,526 (–200)
1	5	Davey Allison	2,465 (–261)
1	6	Bill Elliott	2,440 (–286)
1	7	Ken Schrader	2,379 (–347)
1	8	Terry Labonte	2,333 (–393)
1	9	Geoff Bodine	2,314 (–412)
1	10	Ricky Rudd	2,292 (–434)
Official driver's standings

- Note: Only the first 10 positions are included for the driver standings.

Previous race: 1989 The Budweiser at The Glen	NASCAR Winston Cup Series; 1989 season	Next race: 1989 Busch 500
