= 1991 Champion Spark Plug 400 =

19th race of the 1991 NASCAR Winston Cup Series

Race details
- Race 19 of 29 in the 1991 NASCAR Winston Cup Series
- The 1991 Champion Spark Plug 400 program cover, featuring Mark Martin. Artwork by NASCAR artist Sam Bass.
- Date: August 18, 1991
- Official name: 22nd Annual Champion Spark Plug 400
- Location: Brooklyn, Michigan, Michigan International Speedway
- Course: Permanent racing facility
- Course length: 2 miles (3.2 km)
- Distance: 200 laps, 400 mi (643.737 km)
- Scheduled distance: 200 laps, 400 mi (643.737 km)
- Average speed: 142.972 miles per hour (230.091 km/h)
- Attendance: 90,000

Pole position
Driver	Alan Kulwicki	AK Racing
- Time: 41.515

Most laps led
Driver	Davey Allison	Robert Yates Racing
- Laps: 61

Winner
No. 21	Dale Jarrett	Wood Brothers Racing

Television in the United States
- Network: ESPN
- Announcers: Bob Jenkins, Ned Jarrett, Benny Parsons

Radio in the United States
- Radio: Motor Racing Network

The 1991 Champion Spark Plug 400 was the 19th stock car race of the 1991 NASCAR Winston Cup Series season and the 23rd iteration of the event. The race was held on Sunday, August 18, 1991, before an audience of 90,000 in Brooklyn, Michigan, at Michigan International Speedway, a two-mile (3.2 km) moderate-banked D-shaped speedway. The race took the scheduled 200 laps to complete. In the final laps of the race, Wood Brothers Racing driver Dale Jarrett would mount a late-race charge against Robert Yates Racing driver Davey Allison, passing Allison in the final lap of the race and besting Allison by 8 inches (20 cm) at the finish to take his first career NASCAR Winston Cup Series victory and his only victory of the season. To fill out the top three, Penske Racing South driver Rusty Wallace would finish third.

== Background ==
The layout of Michigan International Speedway, the venue where the race was held.

The race was held at Michigan International Speedway, a two-mile (3.2 km) moderate-banked D-shaped speedway located in Brooklyn, Michigan. The track is used primarily for NASCAR events. It is known as a "sister track" to Texas World Speedway as MIS's oval design was a direct basis of TWS, with moderate modifications to the banking in the corners, and was used as the basis of Auto Club Speedway. The track is owned by International Speedway Corporation. Michigan International Speedway is recognized as one of motorsports' premier facilities because of its wide racing surface and high banking (by open-wheel standards; the 18-degree banking is modest by stock car standards).

=== Entry list ===
- (R) denotes rookie driver.

#	Driver	Team	Make
1	Rick Mast	Precision Products Racing	Oldsmobile
2	Rusty Wallace	Penske Racing South	Pontiac
3	Dale Earnhardt	Richard Childress Racing	Chevrolet
4	Ernie Irvan	Morgan–McClure Motorsports	Chevrolet
5	Ricky Rudd	Hendrick Motorsports	Chevrolet
6	Mark Martin	Roush Racing	Ford
7	Alan Kulwicki	AK Racing	Ford
8	Rick Wilson	Stavola Brothers Racing	Buick
9	Bill Elliott	Melling Racing	Ford
10	Derrike Cope	Whitcomb Racing	Chevrolet
11	Geoff Bodine	Junior Johnson & Associates	Ford
12	Hut Stricklin	Bobby Allison Motorsports	Buick
14	Mike Chase	A. J. Foyt Racing	Oldsmobile
15	Morgan Shepherd	Bud Moore Engineering	Ford
17	Darrell Waltrip	Darrell Waltrip Motorsports	Chevrolet
19	Chad Little	Little Racing	Ford
20	Buddy Baker	Moroso Racing	Oldsmobile
21	Dale Jarrett	Wood Brothers Racing	Ford
22	Sterling Marlin	Junior Johnson & Associates	Ford
24	Dick Trickle	Team III Racing	Pontiac
25	Ken Schrader	Hendrick Motorsports	Chevrolet
26	Brett Bodine	King Racing	Buick
28	Davey Allison	Robert Yates Racing	Ford
30	Michael Waltrip	Bahari Racing	Pontiac
33	Harry Gant	Leo Jackson Motorsports	Oldsmobile
36	H. B. Bailey	Bailey Racing	Pontiac
42	Bobby Hillin Jr.	SABCO Racing	Pontiac
43	Richard Petty	Petty Enterprises	Pontiac
44	Bobby Labonte	Labonte Motorsports	Oldsmobile
49	Stanley Smith (R)	BS&S Motorsports	Buick
52	Jimmy Means	Jimmy Means Racing	Pontiac
55	Ted Musgrave (R)	U.S. Racing	Pontiac
66	Lake Speed	Cale Yarborough Motorsports	Pontiac
68	Bobby Hamilton (R)	TriStar Motorsports	Oldsmobile
71	Dave Marcis	Marcis Auto Racing	Chevrolet
75	Joe Ruttman	RahMoc Enterprises	Oldsmobile
79	Donny Paul	Paul Racing	Oldsmobile
89	Jim Sauter	Mueller Brothers Racing	Pontiac
90	Wally Dallenbach Jr. (R)	Donlavey Racing	Ford
94	Terry Labonte	Hagan Racing	Oldsmobile
98	Jimmy Spencer	Travis Carter Enterprises	Chevrolet

== Qualifying ==
Qualifying was split into two rounds. The first round was held on Friday, August 16, at 3:30 PM EST. Each driver would have one lap to set a time. During the first round, the top 20 drivers in the round would be guaranteed a starting spot in the race. If a driver was not able to guarantee a spot in the first round, they had the option to scrub their time from the first round and try and run a faster lap time in a second round qualifying run, held on Saturday, August 17, at 11:00 AM EST. As with the first round, each driver would have one lap to set a time. For this specific race, positions 21-40 would be decided on time, and depending on who needed it, a select amount of positions were given to cars who had not otherwise qualified but were high enough in owner's points; up to two were given. If needed, a past champion who did not qualify on either time or provisionals could use a champion's provisional, adding one more spot to the field.

Alan Kulwicki, driving for his own AK Racing team, won the pole, setting a time of 41.515 and an average speed of 173.431 mph (279.110 km/h) in the first round.

Donny Paul was the only driver to fail to qualify.

=== Full qualifying results ===
Pos.	#	Driver	Team	Make	Time	Speed
1	7	Alan Kulwicki	AK Racing	Ford	41.515	173.431
2	6	Mark Martin	Roush Racing	Ford	41.543	173.314
3	28	Davey Allison	Robert Yates Racing	Ford	41.624	172.977
4	9	Bill Elliott	Melling Racing	Ford	41.677	172.757
5	4	Ernie Irvan	Morgan–McClure Motorsports	Chevrolet	41.683	172.732
6	11	Geoff Bodine	Junior Johnson & Associates	Ford	41.749	172.459
7	17	Darrell Waltrip	Darrell Waltrip Motorsports	Chevrolet	41.909	171.801
8	22	Sterling Marlin	Junior Johnson & Associates	Ford	42.008	171.396
9	2	Rusty Wallace	Penske Racing South	Pontiac	42.053	171.213
10	15	Morgan Shepherd	Bud Moore Engineering	Ford	42.069	171.147
11	21	Dale Jarrett	Wood Brothers Racing	Ford	42.080	171.103
12	5	Ricky Rudd	Hendrick Motorsports	Chevrolet	42.115	170.960
13	98	Jimmy Spencer	Travis Carter Enterprises	Chevrolet	42.132	170.891
14	33	Harry Gant	Leo Jackson Motorsports	Oldsmobile	42.189	170.661
15	55	Ted Musgrave (R)	U.S. Racing	Pontiac	42.261	170.370
16	19	Chad Little	Little Racing	Ford	42.263	170.362
17	12	Hut Stricklin	Bobby Allison Motorsports	Buick	42.288	170.261
18	25	Ken Schrader	Hendrick Motorsports	Chevrolet	43.300	170.213
19	10	Derrike Cope	Whitcomb Racing	Chevrolet	42.306	170.189
20	42	Bobby Hillin Jr.	SABCO Racing	Pontiac	42.307	170.185
Failed to lock in Round 1
21	30	Michael Waltrip	Bahari Racing	Pontiac	41.692	172.695
22	20	Buddy Baker	Moroso Racing	Oldsmobile	42.069	171.147
23	43	Richard Petty	Petty Enterprises	Pontiac	42.070	171.143
24	49	Stanley Smith (R)	BS&S Motorsports	Buick	42.121	170.936
25	94	Terry Labonte	Hagan Racing	Oldsmobile	42.134	170.883
26	3	Dale Earnhardt	Richard Childress Racing	Chevrolet	42.137	170.871
27	66	Lake Speed	Cale Yarborough Motorsports	Pontiac	42.142	170.851
28	26	Brett Bodine	King Racing	Buick	42.178	170.705
29	8	Rick Wilson	Stavola Brothers Racing	Buick	42.298	170.221
30	1	Rick Mast	Precision Products Racing	Oldsmobile	42.313	170.160
31	24	Dick Trickle	Team III Racing	Pontiac	42.373	169.920
32	75	Joe Ruttman	RahMoc Enterprises	Chevrolet	42.412	169.763
33	71	Dave Marcis	Marcis Auto Racing	Chevrolet	42.427	169.703
34	90	Wally Dallenbach Jr. (R)	Donlavey Racing	Ford	42.487	169.464
35	52	Jimmy Means	Jimmy Means Racing	Pontiac	42.533	169.280
36	68	Bobby Hamilton (R)	TriStar Motorsports	Oldsmobile	42.643	168.844
37	89	Jim Sauter	Mueller Brothers Racing	Pontiac	42.695	168.638
38	14	Mike Chase	A. J. Foyt Racing	Oldsmobile	42.718	168.547
39	36	H. B. Bailey	Bailey Racing	Pontiac	42.758	168.390
40	44	Bobby Labonte	Labonte Motorsports	Oldsmobile	42.789	168.268
Failed to qualify
41	79	Donny Paul	Paul Racing	Oldsmobile	-*	-*
Official first round qualifying results
Official starting lineup

== Race results ==
Fin	St	#	Driver	Team	Make	Laps	Led	Status	Pts	Winnings
1	11	21	Dale Jarrett	Wood Brothers Racing	Ford	200	12	running	180	$74,150
2	3	28	Davey Allison	Robert Yates Racing	Ford	200	61	running	180	$47,700
3	9	2	Rusty Wallace	Penske Racing South	Pontiac	200	0	running	165	$23,600
4	2	6	Mark Martin	Roush Racing	Ford	200	13	running	165	$30,050
5	4	9	Bill Elliott	Melling Racing	Ford	200	48	running	160	$26,600
6	14	33	Harry Gant	Leo Jackson Motorsports	Oldsmobile	200	14	running	155	$17,200
7	5	4	Ernie Irvan	Morgan–McClure Motorsports	Chevrolet	200	1	running	151	$18,850
8	1	7	Alan Kulwicki	AK Racing	Ford	200	1	running	147	$21,000
9	21	30	Michael Waltrip	Bahari Racing	Pontiac	200	1	running	143	$14,850
10	18	25	Ken Schrader	Hendrick Motorsports	Chevrolet	199	7	running	139	$16,500
11	12	5	Ricky Rudd	Hendrick Motorsports	Chevrolet	199	0	running	130	$15,850
12	8	22	Sterling Marlin	Junior Johnson & Associates	Ford	199	0	running	127	$10,450
13	22	20	Buddy Baker	Moroso Racing	Oldsmobile	199	0	running	124	$9,850
14	17	12	Hut Stricklin	Bobby Allison Motorsports	Buick	198	0	running	121	$11,350
15	27	66	Lake Speed	Cale Yarborough Motorsports	Pontiac	198	0	running	118	$11,350
16	25	94	Terry Labonte	Hagan Racing	Oldsmobile	198	0	running	115	$10,050
17	15	55	Ted Musgrave (R)	U.S. Racing	Pontiac	198	0	running	112	$8,450
18	30	1	Rick Mast	Precision Products Racing	Oldsmobile	198	0	running	109	$9,450
19	36	68	Bobby Hamilton (R)	TriStar Motorsports	Oldsmobile	198	0	running	106	$7,400
20	33	71	Dave Marcis	Marcis Auto Racing	Chevrolet	197	0	ignition	103	$9,750
21	31	24	Dick Trickle	Team III Racing	Pontiac	196	0	running	100	$6,575
22	34	90	Wally Dallenbach Jr. (R)	Donlavey Racing	Ford	196	0	running	97	$5,775
23	23	43	Richard Petty	Petty Enterprises	Pontiac	195	0	running	94	$8,350
24	26	3	Dale Earnhardt	Richard Childress Racing	Chevrolet	194	0	running	91	$16,425
25	16	19	Chad Little	Little Racing	Ford	194	0	running	88	$5,525
26	10	15	Morgan Shepherd	Bud Moore Engineering	Ford	193	15	running	90	$12,975
27	35	52	Jimmy Means	Jimmy Means Racing	Pontiac	193	1	running	87	$5,175
28	39	36	H. B. Bailey	Bailey Racing	Pontiac	186	0	running	79	$5,125
29	38	14	Mike Chase	A. J. Foyt Racing	Oldsmobile	156	0	overheating	76	$5,025
30	32	75	Joe Ruttman	RahMoc Enterprises	Chevrolet	143	0	running	73	$7,625
31	37	89	Jim Sauter	Mueller Brothers Racing	Pontiac	140	0	crash	70	$4,825
32	7	17	Darrell Waltrip	Darrell Waltrip Motorsports	Chevrolet	134	0	valve	67	$5,400
33	20	42	Bobby Hillin Jr.	SABCO Racing	Pontiac	134	0	engine	64	$11,725
34	19	10	Derrike Cope	Whitcomb Racing	Chevrolet	125	0	engine	61	$13,075
35	6	11	Geoff Bodine	Junior Johnson & Associates	Ford	123	26	engine	63	$13,925
36	13	98	Jimmy Spencer	Travis Carter Enterprises	Chevrolet	99	0	engine	55	$7,200
37	28	26	Brett Bodine	King Racing	Buick	57	0	engine	52	$6,575
38	40	44	Bobby Labonte	Labonte Motorsports	Oldsmobile	40	0	engine	49	$4,550
39	29	8	Rick Wilson	Stavola Brothers Racing	Buick	39	0	fuel pump	46	$6,525
40	24	49	Stanley Smith (R)	BS&S Motorsports	Buick	30	0	ignition	43	$4,475
Official race results

== Standings after the race ==
Drivers' Championship standings

	Pos	Driver	Points
	1	Dale Earnhardt	2,849
	2	Ricky Rudd	2,780 (-69)
1	3	Davey Allison	2,712 (-137)
1	4	Ernie Irvan	2,695 (–154)
	5	Mark Martin	2,660 (–189)
1	6	Ken Schrader	2,496 (–353)
1	7	Darrell Waltrip	2,476 (–373)
	8	Rusty Wallace	2,451 (–398)
	9	Sterling Marlin	2,410 (–439)
	10	Harry Gant	2,365 (–484)
Official driver's standings

- Note: Only the first 10 positions are included for the driver standings.

Previous race: 1991 Budweiser at The Glen	NASCAR Winston Cup Series; 1991 season	Next race: 1991 Bud 500
