= Oma Kimbrough =

American racing driver (born 1951)

- Born: March 29, 1951 (age 75); Tyrone, Pennsylvania, U.S.

NASCAR Cup Series career
- 3 races run over 3 years
- Best finish: 73rd (1991)
- First race: 1989 The Budweiser At The Glen (Watkins Glen)
- Last race: 1991 Budweiser At The Glen (Watkins Glen)
Wins	Top tens	Poles
0	0	0
- Statistics up to date as of November 5, 2024.

Oma Kimbrough (born March 29, 1951) is an American former professional auto racing driver who has previously competed in the NASCAR Winston Cup Series, where he earned a best finish of 24th at Watkins Glen International in 1991.

Kimbrough also competed in various road racing series such as the IMSA GT Championship and the Trans Am Championship.

== Motorsports career results ==
=== NASCAR ===
(key) (Bold - Pole position awarded by qualifying time. Italics - Pole position earned by points standings or practice time. * – Most laps led.)

==== Winston Cup Series ====
NASCAR Winston Cup Series results
Year	Team	No.	Make	1	2	3	4	5	6	7	8	9	10	11	12	13	14	15	16	17	18	19	20	21	22	23	24	25	26	27	28	29	NWCC	Pts	Ref
1989	Linro Motorsports	13	Chevy	DAY	CAR	ATL	RCH	DAR	BRI	NWS	MAR	TAL	CLT	DOV	SON	POC	MCH	DAY	POC	TAL	GLN; 30	MCH	BRI	DAR	RCH	DOV	MAR	CLT	NWS	CAR	PHO	ATL	88th	73	
1990	Linro Motorsports	13	Buick	DAY	RCH	CAR	ATL	DAR	BRI	NWS	MAR	TAL	CLT	DOV	SON	POC	MCH	DAY	POC	TAL	GLN; 37	MCH	BRI	DAR	RCH	DOV	MAR	NWS	CLT	CAR	PHO	ATL	99th	52	
1991	Linro Motorsports	13	Buick	DAY	RCH	CAR	ATL	DAR	BRI	NWS	MAR	TAL	CLT	DOV	SON	POC	MCH	DAY	POC	TAL	GLN; 24	MCH	BRI	DAR	RCH	DOV	MAR	NWS	CLT	CAR	PHO	ATL	73rd	91	

==== Busch North Series ====
NASCAR Busch North Series results
Year	Team	No.	Make	1	2	3	4	5	6	7	8	9	10	11	12	13	14	15	16	17	18	19	20	21	22	NBNSC	Pts	Ref
1995	Spraker Racing	60	Olds	DAY	NHA	LEE	JEN	NHA	NZH	HOL	BEE	TMP	GLN	NHA	TIO	MND	GLN	EPP	RPS	LEE	STA	BEE	NHA	TMP	LRP; QL	N/A	0	
