= 1991 Budweiser at The Glen =

18th race of 1991 NASCAR Winston Cup Series

Race details
- Race 18 of 29 in the 1991 NASCAR Winston Cup Series
- The 1991 Budweiser at The Glen program cover, featuring Geoff Bodine.
- Date: August 11, 1991
- Official name: 6th Annual Budweiser at The Glen
- Location: Watkins Glen, New York, Watkins Glen International
- Course: Permanent racing facility
- Course length: 2.428 miles (3.907 km)
- Distance: 90 laps, 218.52 mi (351.674 km)
- Average speed: 98.977 miles per hour (159.288 km/h)
- Attendance: 125,000

Pole position
Driver	Terry Labonte	Hagan Racing
- Time: 1:11.851

Most laps led
Driver	Ernie Irvan	Morgan-McClure Motorsports
- Laps: 39

Winner
No. 4	Ernie Irvan	Morgan-McClure Motorsports

Television in the United States
- Network: ESPN
- Announcers: Bob Jenkins, Ned Jarrett, Benny Parsons

Radio in the United States
- Radio: Motor Racing Network

The 1991 Budweiser at The Glen was the 18th stock car race of the 1991 NASCAR Winston Cup Series and the sixth iteration of the event. The race was held on Sunday, August 11, 1991, before an audience of 125,000 on the 2.428-mile (3.907 km) short course at Watkins Glen International in Watkins Glen, New York, USA.

The race was won by Ernie Irvan in the No. 4 Chevrolet for Morgan-McClure Motorsports. Ricky Rudd finished second in the No. 5 Chevrolet for Hendrick Motorsports, and Mark Martin finished third in the No. 6 Ford for Roush Racing.

The race was marred by a crash involving Jimmy Means and J. D. McDuffie in the circuit's fifth turn, The Loop, during lap five. A mechanical failure on McDuffie's No. 70 Pontiac led to him crashing at nearly full race speed into a tire barrier, where he was killed on impact.

== Background ==
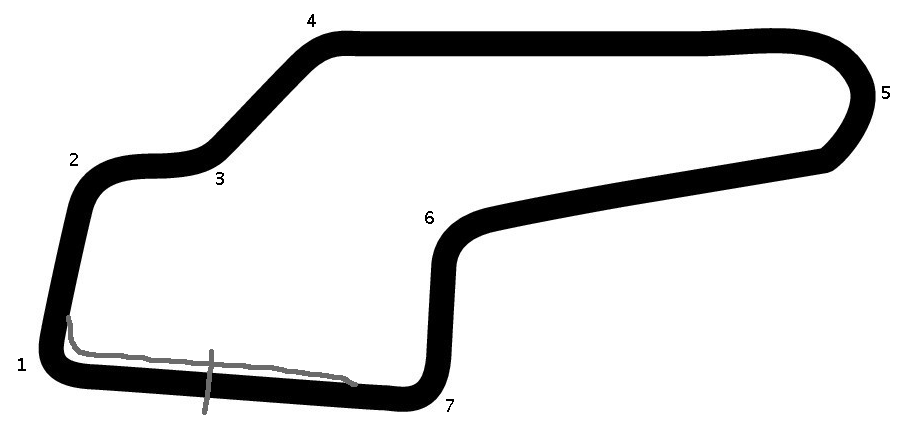
The layout of Watkins Glen International NASCAR used at the time.

=== Media coverage ===
The race was covered on television by ESPN as part of their contract to air NASCAR Winston Cup Series events. Bob Jenkins, Benny Parsons, and Ned Jarrett were the broadcast team with Jerry Punch and John Kernan as pit reporters. Jenkins called the race from the broadcast tower on the front stretch while Parsons and Jarrett were stationed on the track; Parsons was stationed at turn 1 while Jarrett was positioned at the exit of The Loop in turn 5.

Radio coverage was provided by Motor Racing Network.

=== Entry list ===
- (R) denotes rookie driver.

No.	Driver	Team	Make
1	Rick Mast	Precision Products Racing	Oldsmobile
2	Rusty Wallace	Penske Racing South	Pontiac
3	Dale Earnhardt	Richard Childress Racing	Chevrolet
4	Ernie Irvan	Morgan–McClure Motorsports	Chevrolet
5	Ricky Rudd	Hendrick Motorsports	Chevrolet
6	Mark Martin	Roush Racing	Ford
7	Alan Kulwicki	AK Racing	Ford
8	Rick Wilson	Stavola Brothers Racing	Buick
9	Bill Elliott	Melling Racing	Ford
10	Derrike Cope	Whitcomb Racing	Chevrolet
11	Geoff Bodine	Junior Johnson & Associates	Ford
12	Hut Stricklin	Bobby Allison Motorsports	Buick
13	Oma Kimbrough	Linro Motorsports	Buick
15	Morgan Shepherd	Bud Moore Engineering	Ford
17	Darrell Waltrip	Darrell Waltrip Motorsports	Chevrolet
19	Chad Little	Little Racing	Ford
20	Kim Campbell	Moroso Racing	Oldsmobile
21	Dale Jarrett	Wood Brothers Racing	Ford
22	Sterling Marlin	Junior Johnson & Associates	Ford
24	Dorsey Schroeder	Team III Racing	Pontiac
25	Ken Schrader	Hendrick Motorsports	Chevrolet
26	Brett Bodine	King Racing	Buick
28	Davey Allison	Robert Yates Racing	Ford
30	Michael Waltrip	Bahari Racing	Pontiac
33	Harry Gant	Leo Jackson Motorsports	Oldsmobile
42	Bobby Hillin Jr.	SABCO Racing	Pontiac
43	Richard Petty	Petty Enterprises	Pontiac
44	Irv Hoerr	Labonte Motorsports	Oldsmobile
52	Jimmy Means	Jimmy Means Racing	Pontiac
53	John Paul Jr.	Team Ireland	Chevrolet
54	Jim Derhaag	Hakes Racing	Oldsmobile
55	Ted Musgrave (R)	U.S. Racing	Pontiac
66	Lake Speed	Cale Yarborough Motorsports	Pontiac
68	Bobby Hamilton (R)	TriStar Motorsports	Oldsmobile
70	J. D. McDuffie	McDuffie Racing	Pontiac
71	Dave Marcis	Marcis Auto Racing	Chevrolet
75	Joe Ruttman	RahMoc Enterprises	Oldsmobile
90	Wally Dallenbach Jr. (R)	Donlavey Racing	Ford
94	Terry Labonte	Hagan Racing	Oldsmobile
98	Jimmy Spencer	Travis Carter Enterprises	Chevrolet

== Qualifying ==
Qualifying was split into two rounds. The first round was held on Friday, August 9, at 1:00 PM EST. Each driver would have one lap to set a time. During the first round, the top 20 drivers in the round would be guaranteed a starting spot in the race. If a driver was not able to guarantee a spot in the first round, they had the option to scrub their time from the first round and try and run a faster lap time in a second round qualifying run, held on Saturday, August 10, at 11:00 AM EST. As with the first round, each driver would have one lap to set a time. For this specific race, positions 21-40 would be decided on time, and depending on who needed it, a select amount of positions were given to cars who had not otherwise qualified on time but were high enough in owner's points; up to two provisionals were given. If needed, a past champion who did not qualify on either time or provisionals could use a champion's provisional, adding one more spot to the field.

Terry Labonte, driving the No. 94 Oldsmobile for Hagan Racing, would win the pole, setting a time of 1:11.851 and an average speed of 121.652 mph (195.780 km/h) in the first round. The lap was a new track record. Thirty-nine drivers qualified on time. Michael Waltrip crashed his No. 30 Pontiac during his qualifying run and did not record a time, starting fortieth with a provisional. Jim Sauter, Jerry O'Neil, and Bob Ferree all were entered but withdrew from the event.

=== Full qualifying results ===
Pos.	No.	Driver	Team	Make	Time	Speed
1	94	Terry Labonte	Hagan Racing	Oldsmobile	1:11.851	121.652
2	6	Mark Martin	Roush Racing	Ford	1:12.002	121.397
3	4	Ernie Irvan	Morgan–McClure Motorsports	Chevrolet	1:12.179	121.099
4	11	Geoff Bodine	Junior Johnson & Associates	Ford	1:12.186	121.087
5	90	Wally Dallenbach Jr. (R)	Donlavey Racing	Ford	1:12.427	120.684
6	25	Ken Schrader	Hendrick Motorsports	Chevrolet	1:12.680	120.264
7	17	Darrell Waltrip	Darrell Waltrip Motorsports	Chevrolet	1:12.776	120.106
8	3	Dale Earnhardt	Richard Childress Racing	Chevrolet	1:13.140	119.508
9	28	Davey Allison	Robert Yates Racing	Ford	1:13.328	119.201
10	66	Lake Speed	Cale Yarborough Motorsports	Pontiac	1:13.363	119.145
11	24	Dorsey Schroeder	Team III Racing	Pontiac	1:13.512	118.903
12	7	Alan Kulwicki	AK Racing	Ford	1:13.563	118.821
13	44	Irv Hoerr	Labonte Motorsports	Oldsmobile	1:13.608	118.748
14	21	Dale Jarrett	Wood Brothers Racing	Ford	1:13.623	118.724
15	33	Harry Gant	Leo Jackson Motorsports	Oldsmobile	1:13.626	118.719
16	42	Bobby Hillin Jr.	SABCO Racing	Pontiac	1:13.633	118.708
17	8	Rick Wilson	Stavola Brothers Racing	Buick	1:13.656	118.671
18	26	Brett Bodine	King Racing	Buick	1:13.682	118.629
19	9	Bill Elliott	Melling Racing	Ford	1:13.729	118.553
20	71	Dave Marcis	Marcis Auto Racing	Chevrolet	1:13.782	118.468
Failed to lock in Round 1
21	2	Rusty Wallace	Penske Racing South	Pontiac	1:12.028	121.353
22	5	Ricky Rudd	Hendrick Motorsports	Chevrolet	1:12.843	119.995
23	19	Chad Little	Little Racing	Ford	1:13.411	119.067
24	1	Rick Mast	Precision Products Racing	Oldsmobile	1:13.504	118.916
25	15	Morgan Shepherd	Wood Brothers Racing	Ford	1:13.940	118.215
26	10	Derrike Cope	Whitcomb Racing	Chevrolet	1:13.961	118.181
27	53	John Paul Jr.	Team Ireland	Chevrolet	1:14.041	118.054
28	22	Sterling Marlin	Junior Johnson & Associates	Ford	1:14.106	117.950
29	75	Joe Ruttman	RahMoc Enterprises	Oldsmobile	1:14.174	117.842
30	12	Hut Stricklin	Bobby Allison Motorsports	Buick	1:14.381	117.514
31	43	Richard Petty	Petty Enterprises	Pontiac	1:14.403	117.479
32	68	Bobby Hamilton (R)	TriStar Motorsports	Oldsmobile	1:14.789	116.873
33	98	Jimmy Spencer	Travis Carter Enterprises	Chevrolet	1:14.962	116.603
34	55	Ted Musgrave (R)	U.S. Racing	Pontiac	1:15.698	115.469
35	70	J. D. McDuffie	McDuffie Racing	Pontiac	1:16.290	114.573
36	52	Jimmy Means	Jimmy Means Racing	Pontiac	1:16.870	113.709
37	20	Kim Campbell	Moroso Racing	Oldsmobile	1:17.209	113.210
38	54	Jim Derhaag	Hakes Racing	Oldsmobile	1:18.302	111.629
39	13	Oma Kimbrough	Linro Motorsports	Buick	1:18.772	110.963
Provisional
40	30	Michael Waltrip	Bahari Racing	Pontiac	-	-
Official first round qualifying results
Official starting lineup

Allison and Marcis were forced to start from the rear of the field. Allison pitted while on the pace laps, while Marcis started the race in a backup car.

== Lap 5 crash ==
As the field entered the Loop on lap 5, the left front wheel spindle broke on J. D. McDuffie's No. 70 Pontiac, causing his brakes to fail and a wheel to come off of the car. He made contact with Jimmy Means, like McDuffie an owner-driver, and both the No. 70 and Means' No. 52 Pontiac left the racing surface and headed into the runoff area exiting the turn, which consisted of grass and a tire barrier placed in front of an Armco guardrail attached to a fence. McDuffie, with no way to slow his damaged car, hit the tires at 160 MPH. The force generated by the impact caused his car to become airborne, rotate 180 degrees, and land on the grass upside down. McDuffie suffered a basilar skull fracture in the accident and died instantly.

McDuffie's basilar skull fracture was presumed to have been caused by rapid head movement to his right rather than an impact. McDuffie's family and crew members have long believed that his injuries were caused by a foreign object entering the vehicle. McDuffie's sponsor, Medford Speed, hired accident investigators, Phil Moser and Terry Shaw, to perform to determine the cause of the fatal injuries. The investigation concluded that upon impact with the tire barrier, a tire from the barrier entered the cockpit through the passenger side window and struck McDuffie on the right side of his head near the jaw, causing his fatal head injuries. The report cited a "black tar-like substance" on the window and damage to McDuffie's helmet foam and microphone tab that was consistent with a tire from the barrier entering the car upon impact.

Means, meanwhile, was able to slow his car down before he hit the tire barrier; the No. 52 actually went underneath the No. 70 while it was in the air. Getting out of his own wrecked car, Means went over to McDuffie to check on his fellow driver. A few seconds later, having seen McDuffie's condition, Means began frantically waving for track safety officials to come to the scene. Means then spoke to Ned Jarrett, who as mentioned before was stationed on the track just behind where the accident occurred, on the ESPN broadcast moments later that he hoped his fellow driver was okay but conceded the situation did not look good. Means later said he had to "close his eyes" after seeing McDuffie in his car.

Just as the drivers completed the fifth lap, NASCAR threw the red flag and stopped the drivers on the front stretch. The race was red-flagged for one hour and 48 minutes, both to extract McDuffie from his car and repair the guardrail in turn 5, which was bent inward following the impact of Means' car on the tire barrier. Later, as the race was restarting, Jerry Punch of ESPN and Bill Bowser of MRN were both present for the official statement from Winston Cup Media Director Chip Williams that McDuffie had died from his injuries sustained in the crash. On ESPN, Bob Jenkins then eulogized McDuffie before Benny Parsons spoke directly to McDuffie's widow, Ima Jean.

"Jean, I know exactly what you're going through, sweetheart. And you fans out there – you wonder – how these guys can get in these cars and go back out and restart this race. Hey, it's their job. It's what they do – there's a hundred thousand people here this afternoon to watch them do that job. There's not a one of these drivers that wants to be in that race car right now, they want to be in the garage area hugging their wife, their girlfriend, their mom, their crew members, whoever. I don't want to be here now. I want to be over there looking at Ned, and looking at Bob and just not saying anything. But we've got a job to do, and that's report to you who wins, who loses, and what happens during the day. Jean, we all love you and we're sorry."

— Benny Parsons, addressing J. D. McDuffie's death on ESPN.

As he had mentioned, Parsons had his own experience in having to deal with a spousal death. Earlier that season, during the Winston Cup’s June race weekend at Pocono, he had stayed behind at his North Carolina home to be with his wife Connie as she battled a terminal illness. On the day of the race, which Jenkins and Jarrett called without him, Connie Parsons died.

McDuffie was credited with a last-place finish of 40th, while Means was credited with a 39th place finish.

=== Response by Watkins Glen International ===
McDuffie's fatal accident was the most recent in a string of accidents involving cars losing brakes or wheels entering The Loop. When NASCAR visited Watkins Glen in 1989, Geoff Bodine blew a tire entering the turn on the penultimate lap of the event, losing his brakes and hitting the tire barrier head on; he did not suffer any injuries in the crash. On June 30, 1991, during the running of the IMSA Camel Continental sports car event, Tommy Kendall suffered a wheel failure in his Intrepid RM-1 before crashing hard in turn 5, breaking both of his legs.

Although track officials did not specifically cite the two serious incidents as their reasoning, for 1992 Watkins Glen International installed a bus stop chicane near Turn 5 in order to slow the cars down before entering The Loop. The circuit left it up to the individual racing series as to whether or not they would use what would be referred to as the Inner Loop going forward. Those that do have access to what is now the Outer Loop blocked off with pylons, while those that run the original course layout block off the Inner Loop.

== Race results ==
Fin	St	No.	Driver	Team	Make	Laps	Led	Status	Pts	Winnings
1	3	4	Ernie Irvan	Morgan–McClure Motorsports	Chevrolet	90	39	running	185	$64,850
2	22	5	Ricky Rudd	Hendrick Motorsports	Chevrolet	90	11	running	175	$37,325
3	2	6	Mark Martin	Roush Racing	Ford	90	0	running	165	$31,440
4	21	2	Rusty Wallace	Penske Racing South	Pontiac	90	0	running	160	$16,680
5	14	21	Dale Jarrett	Wood Brothers Racing	Ford	90	0	running	155	$18,565
6	7	17	Darrell Waltrip	Darrell Waltrip Motorsports	Chevrolet	90	0	running	150	$11,600
7	19	9	Bill Elliott	Melling Racing	Ford	90	0	running	146	$16,030
8	30	12	Hut Stricklin	Bobby Allison Motorsports	Buick	90	0	running	142	$11,320
9	31	43	Richard Petty	Petty Enterprises	Pontiac	90	0	running	138	$11,640
10	9	28	Davey Allison	Robert Yates Racing	Ford	90	3	running	139	$18,100
11	23	19	Chad Little	Little Racing	Ford	90	0	running	130	$5,590
12	28	22	Sterling Marlin	Junior Johnson & Associates	Ford	90	0	running	127	$7,250
13	26	10	Derrike Cope	Whitcomb Racing	Chevrolet	90	0	running	124	$13,560
14	29	75	Joe Ruttman	RahMoc Enterprises	Oldsmobile	90	0	running	121	$8,720
15	8	3	Dale Earnhardt	Richard Childress Racing	Chevrolet	90	1	running	123	$16,180
16	27	53	John Paul Jr.	Team Ireland	Chevrolet	90	0	running	115	$4,610
17	11	24	Dorsey Schroeder	Team III Racing	Pontiac	90	3	running	117	$6,840
18	16	42	Bobby Hillin Jr.	SABCO Racing	Pontiac	89	0	running	109	$11,370
19	17	8	Rick Wilson	Stavola Brothers Racing	Buick	89	0	running	106	$7,515
20	38	54	Jim Derhaag	Hakes Racing	Oldsmobile	88	0	running	103	$5,120
21	40	30	Michael Waltrip	Bahari Racing	Pontiac	88	0	running	100	$6,995
22	4	11	Geoff Bodine	Junior Johnson & Associates	Ford	86	3	running	102	$12,575
23	12	7	Alan Kulwicki	AK Racing	Ford	82	0	radiator	94	$10,680
24	39	13	Oma Kimbrough	Linro Motorsports	Buick	80	0	oil line	91	$3,620
25	18	26	Brett Bodine	King Racing	Buick	77	0	engine	88	$6,685
26	34	55	Ted Musgrave (R)	U.S. Racing	Pontiac	76	1	running	90	$4,725
27	33	98	Jimmy Spencer	Travis Carter Enterprises	Chevrolet	72	0	engine	82	$6,265
28	15	33	Harry Gant	Leo Jackson Motorsports	Oldsmobile	71	0	running	79	$6,105
29	32	68	Bobby Hamilton (R)	TriStar Motorsports	Oldsmobile	70	0	running	76	$3,995
30	6	25	Ken Schrader	Hendrick Motorsports	Chevrolet	68	10	camshaft	78	$6,660
31	37	20	Kim Campbell	Moroso Racing	Oldsmobile	64	0	crash	70	$3,725
32	5	90	Wally Dallenbach Jr. (R)	Donlavey Racing	Ford	58	0	steering	67	$3,010
33	10	66	Lake Speed	Cale Yarborough Motorsports	Pontiac	55	0	rear end	64	$5,575
34	1	94	Terry Labonte	Hagan Racing	Oldsmobile	47	19	engine	66	$9,490
35	24	1	Rick Mast	Precision Products Racing	Oldsmobile	41	0	transmission	58	$4,830
36	25	15	Morgan Shepherd	Wood Brothers Racing	Ford	33	0	engine	55	$9,800
37	20	71	Dave Marcis	Marcis Auto Racing	Chevrolet	11	0	brakes	52	$4,745
38	13	44	Irv Hoerr	Labonte Motorsports	Oldsmobile	8	0	engine	49	$2,710
39	36	52	Jimmy Means	Jimmy Means Racing	Pontiac	4	0	crash	46	$2,655
40	35	70	J. D. McDuffie	McDuffie Racing	Pontiac	4	0	Fatal accident	43	$2,595
Official race results

== Standings after the race ==
Drivers' Championship standings

	Pos	Driver	Points
	1	Dale Earnhardt	2,758
	2	Ricky Rudd	2,650 (–108)
1	3	Ernie Irvan	2,544 (–214)
1	4	Davey Allison	2,532 (–226)
	5	Mark Martin	2,495 (–263)
1	6	Darrell Waltrip	2,409 (–349)
1	7	Ken Schrader	2,357 (–401)
2	8	Rusty Wallace	2,286 (–472)
1	9	Sterling Marlin	2,283 (–475)
1	10	Harry Gant	2,210 (–548)
Official driver's standings

- Note: Only the first 10 positions are included for the driver standings.

Previous race: 1991 DieHard 500	NASCAR Winston Cup Series; 1991 season	Next race: 1991 Champion Spark Plug 400
