= FDNY Racing =

NASCAR team

- Owner: Jim Rosenblum
- Base: Concord, North Carolina
- Series: NASCAR Craftsman Truck Series
- Race drivers: Bryan Dauzat
- Manufacturer: Chevrolet
- Opened: 1978

Career
- Debut: Winston Cup Series: 1983 Mason-Dixon 500 (Dover); Craftsman Truck Series: 1995 Skoal Bandit Copper World Classic (Phoenix)
- Latest race: Winston Cup Series: 1993 Miller Genuine Draft 500 (Pocono); Craftsman Truck Series: 2025 MillerTech Battery 200 (Pocono)
- Races competed: Total: 101; Winston Cup Series: 27; Craftsman Truck Series: 74
- Drivers' Championships: 0
- Race victories: 0
- Pole positions: 0

FDNY Racing, formerly named Jim Rosenblum Racing, Jocko's Racing, Linro Motorsports, and Golden Annie Racing, is an American professional stock car racing team that competes in the NASCAR Craftsman Truck Series, fielding the No. 28 Chevrolet Silverado part-time for Bryan Dauzat.

FDNY Racing consists of volunteers from the New York City Fire and Police Departments, with all winnings earned being donated to the Uniformed Firefighters Association Widow's and Children's Fund.

== Team history ==
=== Jim Rosenblum ===
Jim Rosenblum (born January 9, 1940), a native of Mamaroneck, New York, was a street drag racer in his youth. After being inspired by friend and 1960 Indianapolis 500 winner Jim Rathmann, he began competing in the Trans-Am Series in the 1960s, later winning a championship. He began owning stock car teams in 1968.

Rosenblum operates FDNY Racing with his own money. To continue running the team, in 2005 he cashed in his life insurance policy. His brother Norman, the former mayor of Mamaroneck, also works on the team.

In 2004, New York City Mayor Michael Bloomberg awarded Rosenblum the New York Post's Liberty Medal Award. Four years later, he was named an Honorary Battalion Chief by the FDNY.

== Winston Cup Series ==
=== Car No. 13 history ===
During the 1980s, Rosenblum formed Linro Motorsports, which began fielding cars in the NASCAR Winston Cup Series for friend Jocko Maggiacomo in 1983. He drove for the team until he was involved in a serious wreck at Pocono Raceway in 1988. In his place, Rosenblum hired sports car veteran Oma Kimbrough as a road course ringer for the Watkins Glen International races, which he ran in the No. 13 from 1989 to 1991.

Linro later established the Golden Annie Racing banner, which Randy LaJoie raced under at the turn of the decade. Other Cup drivers for Rosenblum included Eddie Bierschwale, Gary Balough, Jeff McClure, Bob Schacht and Kerry Teague until 1993 with No. 13, 27 and 29. Rosenblum's team had a best finish of 24th, accomplished twice by Maggiacomo and Kimbrough at Pocono and Watkins Glen, respectively.

After the creation of the Truck Series, Rosenblum fielded Cup and Truck teams until he shut down the former due to rising costs.

=== Car No. 13 results ===
Year	Driver	No.	Make	1	2	3	4	5	6	7	8	9	10	11	12	13	14	15	16	17	18	19	20	21	22	23	24	25	26	27	28	29	30	31	NWCC	Pts
1983	Jocko Maggiacomo	63	Olds	DAY; DNQ	RCH	CAR	ATL	DAR	NWS	MAR	TAL	NSV	DOV; 36	BRI	CLT	RSD					POC; 26	TAL	MCH	BRI	DAR	RCH	DOV	MAR	NWS	CLT	CAR	ATL	RSD			
1983	Jocko Maggiacomo	63	Buick														POC; 35	MCH	DAY	NSV																
1984	Jocko Maggiacomo	63	Olds	DAY; DNQ	RCH	CAR	ATL	BRI	NWS	DAR	MAR	TAL	NSV	DOV	CLT	RSD	POC	MCH	DAY	NSV	POC	TAL	MCH	BRI	DAR	RCH	DOV	MAR	CLT	NWS	CAR	ATL	RSD			
1986	Jocko Maggiacomo	34	Olds	DAY	RCH	CAR	ATL	BRI	DAR	NWS	MAR	TAL	DOV	CLT	RSD	POC	MCH	DAY	POC; 39	TAL																
1986	Jocko Maggiacomo	63	Buick																		GLN; 36	MCH	BRI	DAR	RCH	DOV	MAR	NWS	CLT	CAR	ATL	RSD; DNQ				
1987	Jocko Maggiacomo	63	Chevy	DAY	CAR	RCH	ATL	DAR	NWS	BRI	MAR	TAL	CLT	DOV	POC	RSD	MCH	DAY	POC; 24	TAL	GLN; 35	MCH; DNQ	BRI	DAR	RCH	DOV	MAR	NWS	CLT	CAR	RSD; 37	ATL				
1988	Jocko Maggiacomo	63	Chevy	DAY; DNQ	RCH	CAR	ATL; DNQ	DAR	BRI	NWS	MAR	TAL	CLT	DOV	RSD; 30	POC; 40	MCH	DAY	POC	TAL	GLN; 35	MCH	BRI	DAR	RCH	DOV	MAR	CLT; DNQ	NWS	CAR; DNQ	PHO	ATL				
1989	Randy LaJoie	63	Chevy	DAY	CAR	ATL	RCH	DAR	BRI	NWS	MAR	TAL	CLT	DOV	SON	POC; 28	MCH	DAY																		
1989	Eddie Bierschwale	13	Chevy																POC; 32	TAL																
1989	Oma Kimbrough	13	Chevy																		GLN; 30	MCH	BRI	DAR	RCH	DOV	MAR	CLT	NWS	CAR	PHO	ATL				
1990	Randy LaJoie	13	Buick	DAY	RCH	CAR	ATL	DAR	BRI	NWS	MAR	TAL	CLT	DOV	SON	POC; 33	MCH	DAY	POC; 38	TAL																
1990	Oma Kimbrough	13	Buick																		GLN; 37	MCH	BRI	DAR												
1990	Kerry Teague	13	Buick																						RCH; DNQ	DOV; DNQ	MAR	NWS	CLT; DNQ	CAR	PHO	ATL				
1991	Brian Ross	13	Buick	DAY; DNQ	RCH	CAR	ATL	DAR	BRI	NWS	MAR	TAL																								
1991	Kerry Teague	29	Buick										CLT; DNQ	DOV	SON																					
1991	Kerry Teague	13	Buick																													ATL; DNQ				
1991	Randy LaJoie	13	Buick													POC; 29	MCH	DAY																		
1991	Oma Kimbrough	13	Buick																		GLN; 24	MCH	BRI	DAR	RCH	DOV	MAR	NWS								
1991	Gary Balough	13	Buick																POC; 40	TAL																
1991	Gary Balough	27	Pontiac																										CLT; 39	CAR	PHO					
1992	Gary Balough	27	Chevy	DAY	CAR	RCH	ATL	DAR	BRI	NWS	MAR	TAL	CLT; 40	DOV	SON	POC	MCH	DAY																		
1992	Bob Schacht	27	Chevy																POC; 38	TAL																
1992	Bob Schacht	27	Olds																		GLN; 30															
1992	Jeff McClure	27	Chevy																			MCH; 31	BRI	DAR	RCH	DOV	MAR	NWS	CLT	CAR	PHO	ATL				
1993	Kerry Teague	29	Chevy	DAY; DNQ	CAR	RCH	ATL	DAR	BRI	NWS	MAR	TAL	SON	CLT	DOV	POC; 26	MCH	DAY; DNQ	NHA	POC; 34	TAL; DNQ	GLN; DNQ	MCH	BRI	DAR	RCH	DOV	MAR	NWS	CLT	CAR	PHO	ATL			
1994	Kerry Teague	13	Chevy	DAY	CAR	RCH	ATL	DAR	BRI	NWS	MAR	TAL	SON	CLT	DOV	POC	MCH	DAY	NHA	POC	TAL	IND; DNQ	GLN	MCH	BRI	DAR	RCH	DOV	MAR	NWS	CLT	CAR	PHO	ATL		
1995	Kerry Teague	51	Chevy	DAY; DNQ	CAR	RCH	ATL	DAR	BRI	NWS	MAR	TAL	SON	CLT	DOV	POC	MCH	DAY	NHA	POC	TAL	IND	GLN	MCH	BRI	DAR	RCH	DOV	MAR	NWS	CLT	CAR	PHO	ATL		

== Truck Series ==
=== Truck No. 28 history ===
Rosenblum started a team in the Truck Series' inaugural 1995 season for Teague as the No. 51; Teague's best finish with the team was 13th, achieved at Tucson Raceway Park and Bristol Motor Speedway. In 1996, Rosenblum fielded one-off runs for T. J. Clark, Ritchie Petty, and Perry Tripp before shutting the team down due to monetary problems. They did one last attempt in 1997 with Terry McCarthy, but did not qualify. Two years later, he revived the operation and fielded trucks for Ronnie Hoover (1999) and Kenny Allen and Conrad Burr (2000). In 1999, they also changed the number to 28. Kenny Allen would then fail to qualify at Daytona in 2001.

After the September 11 attacks in 2001, Rosenblum associated with retired firefighter Lt. Mike Bolnik, who suggested rebranding the team to support those affected. Partnering with RahMoc Enterprises owner Bob Rahilly, Rosenblum would rename the team FDNY Racing in 2002. Burr returned to the team in 2002, qualifying for all but one race in six attempts. Joe Ruttman also ran a race for the team at Darlington Raceway. Kenny Allen attempted Daytona in 2002 but didn't qualify. L. W. Miller would attempt Martinsville in 2002 but did not qualify. In 2003, L. W. Miller ran the first five races of the season. A year later, Buddy Davis failed to qualify the No. 28 at Indianapolis Raceway Park. Also in 2004, L. W. Miller attempted Daytona but did not qualify.

In 2005, for the season opener at Daytona International Speedway, the truck ran with a decal stating "Always remember... never forget" and the names of firefighters Lt. Curtis Meyran, John Bellew, and Richard Sclafani; the three had died on Black Sunday in fires earlier in the year. The team attempted two races with David Ragan in 2005, including another run at Lowe's, but failed to qualify for both. The team made a return to a race in 2006 with Carl Long at Lowe's Motor Speedway. Long also made two other attempts, but he only made Charlotte. In 2007, Brandon Knupp did 2 races, and Shane Sieg attempted Martinsville. Sieg did not qualify. In 2008, Wayne Edwards attempted four races but made two. In 2009, Andy Lally attempted 2 races but made one of them. Edwards returned at Charlotte, only to DNQ there. In 2010, L. W. Miller, Wayne Edwards, Andy Lally, and Chad McCumbee attempted races for the team. Lally and McCumbee made their races, while Miller and Edwards did not. Wes Burton raced for the team in 2011. Also in 2011, Grant Enfinger attempted Daytona but did not qualify. In 2012, Wes Burton returned to make five attempts but only made one of them. In 2013, Blake Koch and Dominick Casola contested a race each. Also in 2013, Whelen Southern Modified Tour driver Andy Seuss attempted to make his series debut at Rockingham Speedway, but missed the race.

In 2014, Grand-Am driver Ryan Ellis tested with the team at Daytona's Preseason Thunder session and led the speed charts with a speed of 186 miles per hour (299 km/h). On January 22, he joined the team on a part-time basis starting with Daytona's NextEra Energy Resources 250. During the race at Charlotte, Ellis was involved in a crash with Jake Crum, which destroyed FDNY's truck. After receiving some funding from a GoFundMe campaign and Ellis' Kappa Sigma college fraternity, the team returned at Pocono. During the year, Whelen Modified Tour driver Bryan Dauzat made his Truck Series debut in the No. 28 at Bristol Motor Speedway, where he finished last after completing just four laps due to suspension problems. 2015 marked the FDNY's 150th Anniversary, during which FDNY and Ellis attempted three races, qualifying at Daytona and Bristol, where he finished siteenth and twentieth, respectively. Andy Seuss also tried to make Talladega that year as well, but missed the race.

Seuss returned to the team in 2016, finally making his Truck debut at Charlotte; qualifying was rained out and the team was in position to miss the race due to a lack of race attempts that year, prompting Rosenblum to make an agreement with MAKE Motorsports to take over MAKE's No. 1 truck for the race. He would finish last after crashing on lap twenty. They would attempt Martinsville with Kyle Soper, but failed to qualify. In 2017, they attempted Daytona in February, failing to qualify with Dauzat. They returned with Dauzat at Pocono in July.

In February 2018, the team announced on their Facebook that the season-opening Truck race at Daytona would be their last with Rosenblum retiring. Dauzat drove the No. 28 to an 18th-place finish despite being caught up in a crash with Clay Greenfield and Korbin Forrister. Despite the initial announcement, FDNY Racing returned for that year's Talladega event, where Dauzat finished eighth for his and the team's first top-ten finish. During the season-opening 2019 NextEra Energy 250, Dauzat accidentally hit his jackman Billy Rock on pit road when his truck experienced braking problems. Rock was rushed to Halifax Health for his injuries and was diagnosed with a broken shoulder. He was released from the hospital shortly after.

Dauzat returned to FDNY and their No. 28 truck in 2020. He and the team ran more races than originally scheduled due to the fact that the field size for the Truck Series was expanded from 32 to 40 as a result of the cancellation of qualifying due to the COVID-19 pandemic.

On January 29, 2021, it was revealed that Dauzat would return for another part-time schedule in the FDNY No. 28 truck in 2021, beginning at the season-opener at Daytona and would also run Pocono and Talladega. In 2022, they would race at Daytona, Pocono, and Talladega. Dauzat returned in 2023, attempting Daytona once again, but he did not qualify. He also did not qualify for the race at Pocono but made the field for the Talladega race that fall.

Dauzat made the Daytona race in 2024. He would survive a massive crash on the final lap, and would finish ninth, the 2nd best for FDNY all-time and for Dauzat. He would return to the truck at Nashville, but failed to qualify. He would then run the following race at Pocono, finishing 34th. Dauzat qualified the No. 28 at Talladega but was replaced for the race by Keith McGee, who would finish in 26th.

=== Truck No. 28 results ===
Year	Driver	No.	Make	1	2	3	4	5	6	7	8	9	10	11	12	13	14	15	16	17	18	19	20	21	22	23	24	25	26	NCTC	Pts
1995	Kerry Teague	51	Chevy	PHO; 19	TUS; 13	SGS; 20	MMR; 17	POR; 25	EVG; 19	I70; 17	LVL	BRI; 13	MLW; 27	CNS; 23	HPT; 30	IRP	FLM; 22	RCH	MAR	NWS	SON	MMR	PHO								
1996	Ritchie Petty	51	Chevy	HOM; 17																											
1996	T. J. Clark	51	Chevy		PHO; 12	POR	EVG	TUS	CNS	HPT	BRI																				
1996	Perry Tripp	51	Chevy									NZH; 35	MLW	LVL	I70	IRP	FLM	GLN	NSV	RCH	NHA	MAR	NWS	SON	MMR	PHO	LVS; DNQ				
1997	Terry McCarthy	51	Chevy	WDW	TUS	HOM; DNQ	PHO	POR	EVG	I70	NHA	TEX	BRI	NZH	MLW	LVL	CNS	HPT	IRP	FLM	NSV	GLN	RCH	MAR	SON	MMR	CAL	PHO	LVS	113th	32
1999	Ronnie Hoover	28	Ford	HOM	PHO	EVG	MMR	MAR; DNQ	MEM	PPR	I70	BRI	TEX	PIR	GLN	MLW	NSV	NZH; 28	MCH	NHA	IRP	GTY	HPT	RCH	LVS	LVL	TEX	CAL		75th	116
2000	Kenny Allen	28	Chevy	DAY; DNQ	HOM; 36	PHO	MMR																							61st	211
2000	Conrad Burr	28	Chevy					MAR; 25	PIR	GTY	MEM	PPR	EVG	TEX	KEN	GLN	MLW	NHA	NZH	MCH	IRP	NSV; DNQ	CIC	RCH	DOV	TEX	CAL			61st	211
2001	Kenny Allen	28	Chevy	DAY; DNQ	HOM	MMR	MAR	GTY	DAR	PPR	DOV	TEX	MEM	MLW	KAN	KEN	NHA	IRP	NSH	CIC	NZH	RCH	SBO	TEX	LVS	PHO	CAL			88th	40
2002	Kenny Allen	28	Chevy	DAY; DNQ																										41st	585
2002	Joe Ruttman	28	Chevy		DAR; 35																									41st	585
2002	L. W. Miller	28	Chevy			MAR; DNQ	GTY	PPR	DOV	TEX	MEM	MLW	KAN	KEN	NHA															41st	585
2002	Conrad Burr	28	Chevy													MCH; 27	IRP	NSH; 26	RCH; DNQ	TEX; 26	SBO; 33	LVS; 23	CAL	PHO	HOM					41st	585
2003	L. W. Miller	28	Chevy	DAY; 21	DAR; 16	MMR	MAR; 27	CLT; 20	DOV; 24	TEX	MEM	MLW	KAN	KEN	GTW	MCH	IRP	NSH	BRI	RCH	NHA	CAL	LVS	SBO	TEX	MAR				43rd	571
2003	Tommy Pistone	28	Ford																								PHO; DNQ	HOM		43rd	571
2004	L. W. Miller	28	Chevy	DAY; DNQ	ATL; DNQ	MAR	MFD	CLT	DOV	TEX	MEM	MLW	KAN	KEN	GTW	MCH														59th	132
2004	Buddy Davis	28	Chevy														IRP; DNQ	NSH	BRI	RCH	NHA	LVS	CAL	TEX	MAR	PHO	DAR	HOM		59th	132
2005	David Ragan	28	Chevy	DAY; DNQ	CAL	ATL	MAR	GTY	MFD	CLT; DNQ	DOV	TEX	MCH	MLW	KAN	KEN	MEM	IRP	NSH	BRI	RCH	NHA	LVS	MAR	ATL	TEX	PHO	HOM		60th	86
2006	Carl Long	28	Chevy	DAY; DNQ	CAL	ATL; DNQ	MAR	GTY	CLT; 35	MFD	DOV	TEX	MCH	MLW	KAN	KEN	MEM	IRP	NSH	BRI	NHA	LVS	TAL	MAR	ATL	TEX	PHO	HOM		46th	147
2007	Brandon Knupp	28	Chevy	DAY; 18	CAL	ATL										KEN; 36	IRP	NSH	BRI	GTW	NHA	LVS	TAL	MAR	ATL	TEX	PHO	HOM		44th	210
2007	Shane Sieg	28	Chevy				MAR; DNQ	KAN	CLT	MFD	DOV	TEX	MCH	MLW	MEM															44th	210
2008	Wayne Edwards	28	Chevy	DAY; 17	CAL	ATL	MAR	KAN	CLT; DNQ	MFD	DOV	TEX	MCH	MLW	MEM	KEN; DNQ	IRP	NSH	BRI	GTW	NHA	LVS	TAL; 24	MAR	ATL	TEX	PHO	HOM		43rd	304
2009	Andy Lally	28	Chevy	DAY; DNQ	CAL	ATL	MAR	KAN																	TAL; 26	TEX	PHO	HOM		57th	189
2009	Wayne Edwards	28	Chevy						CLT; DNQ	DOV	TEX	MCH	MLW	MEM	KEN	IRP	NSH	BRI	CHI	IOW	GTW	NHA	LVS	MAR						57th	189
2010	L. W. Miller	28	Chevy	DAY; DNQ	ATL	MAR	NSH	KAN	DOV																					53rd	265
2010	Wayne Edwards	28	Chevy							CLT; DNQ	TEX	MCH	IOW	GTY	IRP															53rd	265
2010	Chad McCumbee	28	Chevy													POC; 31	NSH	DAR	BRI	CHI	KEN	NHA	LVS	MAR						53rd	265
2010	Andy Lally	28	Chevy																						TAL; 20	TEX	PHO	HOM		53rd	265
2011	Grant Enfinger	28	Chevy	DAY; DNQ	PHO	DAR	MAR	NSH	DOV																					49th	52
2011	Wes Burton	28	Chevy							CLT; 33	KAN	TEX	KEN	IOW	NSH	IRP	POC; 23	MCH	BRI	ATL	CHI	NHA	KEN	LVS	TAL; 24	MAR	TEX	HOM		49th	52
2012	Wes Burton	28	Chevy	DAY; DNQ	MAR	CAR; DNQ	KAN	CLT; DNQ	DOV	TEX	KEN	IOW	CHI	POC; 23	MCH	BRI	ATL	IOW	KEN	LVS	TAL; DNQ	MAR	TEX	PHO	HOM					56th	21
2013	Andy Seuss	28	Chevy	DAY	MAR	CAR; DNQ	KAN																							52nd	40
2013	Blake Koch	28	Chevy					CLT; 19	DOV	TEX	KEN	IOW	ELD																	52nd	40
2013	Dominick Casola	28	Chevy											POC; 29	MCH	BRI	MSP	IOW	CHI	LVS	TAL	MAR	TEX	PHO	HOM					52nd	40
2014	Ryan Ellis	28	Chevy	DAY; 18	MAR	KAN	CLT; 27	DOV	TEX	GTW	KEN	IOW	ELD	POC; 19	MCH						TAL; 23	MAR	TEX	PHO	HOM					37th	97
2014	Bryan Dauzat	28	Chevy													BRI; 36	MSP	CHI	NHA	LVS										37th	97
2015	Ryan Ellis	28	Chevy	DAY; 16	ATL	MAR	KAN	CLT; DNQ	DOV	TEX	GTW	IOW	KEN	ELD	POC; 20	MCH	BRI	MSP	CHI	NHA	LVS									44th	52
2015	Andy Seuss	28	Chevy																			TAL; DNQ	MAR	TEX	PHO	HOM				44th	52
2016	Ryan Ellis	28	Chevy	DAY; DNQ	ATL	MAR	KAN	DOV							POC; 20	BRI	MCH	MSP	CHI	NHA	LVS	TAL								45th	13
2016	Andy Seuss	1	Chevy						CLT; 32	TEX	IOW	GTW	KEN	ELD																45th	13
2016	Kyle Soper	28	Chevy																				MAR; DNQ	TEX	PHO	HOM				45th	13
2017	Bryan Dauzat	28	Chevy	DAY; DNQ	ATL	MAR	KAN	CLT	DOV	TEX	GTW	IOW	KEN	ELD	POC; 22	MCH	BRI	MSP	CHI	NHA	LVS	TAL	MAR	TEX	PHO	HOM				51st	15
2018	Bryan Dauzat	28	Chevy	DAY; 18	ATL	LVS	MAR	DOV	KAN	CLT	TEX	IOW	GTW	CHI	KEN	ELD	POC	MCH	BRI	MSP	LVS	TAL; 8	MAR	TEX	PHO	HOM				44th	48
2019	Bryan Dauzat	28	Chevy	DAY; 31	ATL	LVS	MAR	TEX	DOV	KAN	CLT	TEX	IOW	GTW	CHI	KEN	POC; 24	ELD	MCH	BRI	MSP	LVS	TAL; 17	MAR	PHO	HOM				48th	39
2020	Bryan Dauzat	28	Chevy	DAY; 29	LVS	CLT; 34	ATL; 39	HOM	POC; 26	KEN	TEX	KAN; 37	KAN; 37	MCH	DAY	DOV	GTW	DAR	RCH	BRI	LVS	TAL; 21	KAN	TEX	MAR	PHO				43rd	55
2021	Bryan Dauzat	28	Chevy	DAY; 19	DAY	LVS	ATL	BRI	RCH	KAN	DAR	COA	CLT	TEX	NSH	POC; 34	KNX	GLN	GTW	DAR	BRI	LVS	TAL; 39	MAR	PHO					48th	4
2022	Bryan Dauzat	28	Chevy	DAY; 23	LVS	ATL	COA	MAR	BRI	DAR	KAN	TEX	CLT	GTW	SON	KNX	NSH	MOH	POC; DNQ	IRP	RCH	KAN	BRI	TAL; 35	HOM	PHO				48th	16
2023	Bryan Dauzat	28	Chevy	DAY; DNQ	LVS	ATL	COA	TEX	BRI	MAR	KAN	DAR	NWS	CLT	GTW	NSH	MOH	POC; DNQ	RCH	IRP	MLW	KAN	BRI	TAL; 36	HOM	PHO				51st	1
2024	Bryan Dauzat	28	Chevy	DAY; 9	ATL	LVS	BRI	COA	MAR	TEX	KAN	DAR	NWS	CLT	GTW	NSH; DNQ	POC; 34	IRP	RCH	MLW	BRI	KAN	TAL; QL							37th	42
2024	Keith McGee	28	Chevy																				TAL; 26	HOM	MAR	PHO				37th	42
2025	Bryan Dauzat	28	Chevy	DAY; DNQ	ATL	LVS	HOM	MAR	BRI	ROC	TEX	KAN	NWS	CLT	NSH	MCH	POC; 35	LRP	IRP	GLN	RCH	DAR	BRI	NHA	ROV	TAL	MAR	PHO		50th	2
2026	Bryan Dauzat	28	Chevy	DAY; DNQ	ATL	STP	DAR	ROC	BRI	TEX	GLN	DOV	CLT	NSH	MCH	COR	LRP	NWS	IRP	RCH	NHA	BRI	KAN	CLT	PHO	TAL; DNQ	MAR	HOM			
