= NASCAR Cup Series at Watkins Glen International =

NASCAR Cup Series race held at Watkins Glen International

Busch Light at The Glen

NASCAR Cup Series
- Venue: Watkins Glen International
- Location: Watkins Glen, New York, United States
- Corporate sponsor: Busch Light
- First race: 1957
- Distance: 245.54 miles (395.158 km)
- Laps: 100; Stage 1: 20; Stage 2: 30; Final stage: 50
- Previous names: The Glen 101.2 (1957); The Glen 151.8 (1964–1965); The Budweiser at The Glen (1986–1989); Budweiser at The Glen (1990–1993); The Bud at The Glen (1994–1998); Frontier @ the Glen (1999); Global Crossing @ The Glen (2000–2001); Sirius Satellite Radio at the Glen (2002–2005); AMD at the Glen (2006); Centurion Boats at the Glen (2007–2008); Heluva Good! Sour Cream Dips at The Glen (2009–2011); Finger Lakes 355 at The Glen (2012); Cheez-It 355 at the Glen (2013–2016); I Love New York 355 at The Glen (2017); Go Bowling at The Glen (2018–2026)
- Most wins (driver): Tony Stewart (5)
- Most wins (team): Hendrick Motorsports (11)
- Most wins (manufacturer): Chevrolet (24)

Circuit information
- Surface: Asphalt
- Length: 2.454 mi (3.949 km)
- Turns: 7

The Busch Light at The Glen is a NASCAR Cup Series Stock car race at Watkins Glen International in Watkins Glen, New York on its 2.454-mile (3.949 km) road course annually since 1986.

Shane van Gisbergen is the defending race winner, having won it in 2026.

== History ==
Prior to 1986, three races were held in 1957 (in one of the track's first professional races), as well in 1964 and 1965. These races were held in the track's original configuration, which was 2.35 miles long.

The current NASCAR Cup Series began racing at the track in 1986, utilizing a shortened 2.45-mile (3.94 km) course.

In 2017, the race was sponsored by I Love New York. From 2018–2026, the race was sponsored by Go Bowling.

In 2020, the race was not held due to the COVID-19 pandemic. The State of New York was requiring travelers from several states to isolate for 14 days (including North Carolina, where most of NASCAR's teams are located, and Florida, where NASCAR's corporate offices are), and not giving the series a quarantine waiver to enter the state. NASCAR instead held a race on the Daytona International Speedway road course, the Go Bowling 235.

Racing at the 2026 Go Bowling at The Glen

For the 2024 running of this race, it was moved to September and became the second race of the Round of 16 in the NASCAR playoffs. Watkins Glen's stint in the playoffs was short-lived however, as in the 2025 season, Watkins Glen returned to its typical August date.

In 2026 the race was moved to a mid-May date. On December 3, 2025, NASCAR released a schedule for the race weekend that included an extension of the race to 100 laps. Prior to the 2026 race weekend, it was announced on May 7 that Watkins Glen would return to the Chase in 2027. Busch Light was announced as the sponsor on November 16.

=== Track changes ===
In 1986, NASCAR began utilizing a shortened 2.45-mile (3.94 km) course. Following the 1991 death of J. D. McDuffie in a crash in the Outer Loop, at the end of the backstretch, and a subsequent, serious crash by IMSA driver, Tommy Kendall, the Inner Loop "bus stop" chicane was added just before the Outer Loop. The Cup Series has never utilized the "Boot" as IndyCar and Formula One have.

== Past winners ==
Year	Date	No.	Driver	Team	Manufacturer	Race distance		Race time	Average speed (mph)	Report	Ref
Year	Date	No.	Driver	Team	Manufacturer	Laps	Miles (km)	Race time	Average speed (mph)	Report	Ref
2.3 miles (3.7 km) layout
1957	August 4	87	Buck Baker	Buck Baker	Chevrolet	44	101.2 (162.865)	1:13:06	83.064	Report	
1958 – 1963	Not held										
1964	July 19	1	Billy Wade	Bud Moore Engineering	Mercury	66	151.8 (244.298)	1:32:57	97.988	Report	
1965	July 18	21	Marvin Panch	Wood Brothers Racing	Ford	66	151.8 (244.298)	1:32:46	98.182	Report	
1966 – 1985	Not held										
2.428 miles (3.907 km) layout (pre-inner loop chicane)
1986	August 10	25	Tim Richmond	Hendrick Motorsports	Chevrolet	90	218.52 (351.673)	2:12:56	90.463	Report	
1987	August 10*	27	Rusty Wallace	Blue Max Racing	Pontiac	90	218.52 (351.673)	2:24:36	90.682	Report	
1988	August 14	26	Ricky Rudd	King Racing	Buick	90	218.52 (351.673)	2:56:58	74.096	Report	
1989	August 13	27	Rusty Wallace	Blue Max Racing	Pontiac	90	218.52 (351.673)	2:26:55	87.242	Report	
1990	August 12	5	Ricky Rudd	Hendrick Motorsports	Chevrolet	90	218.52 (351.673)	2:21:49	92.452	Report	
1991	August 11	4	Ernie Irvan	Morgan-McClure Motorsports	Chevrolet	90	218.52 (351.673)	2:12:28	98.977	Report	
2.454 miles (3.949 km) layout with inner loop chicane
1992	August 9	42	Kyle Petty	SABCO Racing	Pontiac	51*	125.154 (201.415)	1:27:21	88.980	Report	
1993	August 8	6	Mark Martin	Roush Racing	Ford	90	220.5 (354.86)	2:36:04	84.771	Report	
1994	August 14	6	Mark Martin	Roush Racing	Ford	90	220.5 (354.86)	2:21:07	93.752	Report	
1995	August 13	6	Mark Martin	Roush Racing	Ford	90	220.5 (354.86)	2:11:54	103.030	Report	
1996	August 11	7	Geoff Bodine	Geoff Bodine Racing	Ford	90	220.5 (354.86)	2:23:17	92.334	Report	
1997	August 10	24	Jeff Gordon	Hendrick Motorsports	Chevrolet	90	220.5 (354.86)	2:24:55	91.294	Report	
1998	August 9	24	Jeff Gordon	Hendrick Motorsports	Chevrolet	90	220.5 (354.86)	2:20:03	94.466	Report	
1999	August 15	24	Jeff Gordon	Hendrick Motorsports	Chevrolet	90	220.5 (354.86)	2:30:49	87.722	Report	
2000	August 13	1	Steve Park	Dale Earnhardt, Inc.	Chevrolet	90	220.5 (354.86)	2:24:51	91.336	Report	
2001	August 12	24	Jeff Gordon	Hendrick Motorsports	Chevrolet	90	220.5 (354.86)	2:28:31	89.081	Report	
2002	August 11	20	Tony Stewart	Joe Gibbs Racing	Pontiac	90	220.5 (354.86)	2:40:56	82.208	Report	
2003	August 10	31	Robby Gordon	Richard Childress Racing	Chevrolet	90	220.5 (354.86)	2:26:17	90.441	Report	
2004	August 15	20	Tony Stewart	Joe Gibbs Racing	Chevrolet	90	220.5 (354.86)	2:23:25	92.249	Report	
2005	August 14	20	Tony Stewart	Joe Gibbs Racing	Chevrolet	92*	225.4 (362.746)	2:35:48	86.804	Report	
2006	August 13	29	Kevin Harvick	Richard Childress Racing	Chevrolet	90	220.5 (354.86)	2:52:27	76.718	Report	
2007	August 12	20	Tony Stewart	Joe Gibbs Racing	Chevrolet	90	220.5 (354.86)	2:50:38	77.535	Report	
2008	August 10	18	Kyle Busch	Joe Gibbs Racing	Toyota	90	220.5 (354.86)	2:16:11	97.148	Report	
2009	August 10*	14	Tony Stewart	Stewart–Haas Racing	Chevrolet	90	220.5 (354.86)	2:26:31	90.297	Report	
2010	August 8	42	Juan Pablo Montoya*	Earnhardt Ganassi Racing	Chevrolet	90	220.5 (354.86)	2:23:52	91.960	Report	
2011	August 15*	9	Marcos Ambrose*	Richard Petty Motorsports	Ford	92*	225.4 (362.746)	2:16:02	99.417	Report	
2012	August 12	9	Marcos Ambrose	Richard Petty Motorsports	Ford	90	220.5 (354.86)	2:14:48	98.145	Report	
2013	August 11	18	Kyle Busch	Joe Gibbs Racing	Toyota	90	220.5 (354.86)	2:32:04	87.001	Report	
2014	August 10	47	A. J. Allmendinger	JTG Daugherty Racing	Chevrolet	90	220.5 (354.86)	2:26:48	90.123	Report	
2015	August 9	22	Joey Logano	Team Penske	Ford	90	220.5 (354.86)	2:24:43	91.42	Report	
2016	August 7	11	Denny Hamlin	Joe Gibbs Racing	Toyota	90	220.5 (354.86)	2:27:48	89.513	Report	
2017	August 6	78	Martin Truex Jr.	Furniture Row Racing	Toyota	90	220.5 (354.86)	2:07:03	104.132	Report	
2018	August 5	9	Chase Elliott	Hendrick Motorsports	Chevrolet	90	220.5 (354.86)	2:13:44	98.928	Report	
2019	August 4	9	Chase Elliott	Hendrick Motorsports	Chevrolet	90	220.5 (354.86)	2:14:17	98.523	Report	
2020*	August 16	Moved to Daytona road course due to COVID-19 pandemic									
2021	August 8	5	Kyle Larson	Hendrick Motorsports	Chevrolet	90	220.5 (354.86)	2:10:57	101.031	Report	
2022	August 21	5	Kyle Larson	Hendrick Motorsports	Chevrolet	90	220.5 (354.86)	2:17:52	95.962	Report	
2023	August 20	24	William Byron	Hendrick Motorsports	Chevrolet	90	220.5 (354.86)	1:58:44	111.426	Report	
2024	September 15	17	Chris Buescher	RFK Racing	Ford	92*	225.4 (362.746)	2:38:41	80.226	Report	
2025	August 10	88	Shane van Gisbergen	Trackhouse Racing	Chevrolet	90	220.5 (354.86)	2:10:39	101.263	Report	
2026	May 10	97	Shane van Gisbergen	Trackhouse Racing	Chevrolet	100	242.8 (390.749)	2:29:11	98.536	Report	
2027	September 19									Report	

- 1987, 2009, & 2011: Race postponed from Sunday to Monday due to rain.
- 1992: Race shortened due to rain.
- 2005, 2011, & 2024: Race extended due to NASCAR overtime.
- 2020: Race canceled and moved to the Daytona road course due to quarantine requirements in New York associated with the COVID-19 pandemic.

=== Multiple winners (drivers) ===
# of wins	Driver	Years won
5	Tony Stewart	2002, 2004–2005, 2007, 2009
4	Jeff Gordon	1997–1999, 2001
3	Mark Martin	1993–1995
2	Rusty Wallace	1987, 1989
2	Ricky Rudd	1988, 1990
2	Marcos Ambrose	2011–2012
2	Kyle Busch	2008, 2013
2	Chase Elliott	2018–2019
2	Kyle Larson	2021–2022
2	Shane van Gisbergen	2025–2026

=== Multiple winners (teams) ===
# of wins	Team	Years won
11	Hendrick Motorsports	1986, 1990, 1997–1999, 2001, 2018–2019, 2021–2023
7	Joe Gibbs Racing	2002, 2004–2005, 2007–2008, 2013, 2016
4	RFK Racing	1993–1995, 2024
2	Blue Max Racing	1987, 1989
2	Richard Childress Racing	2003, 2006
2	Richard Petty Motorsports	2011–2012
2	Trackhouse Racing	2025–2026

=== Manufacturer wins ===
# of wins	Manufacturer	Years won
24	Chevrolet	1957, 1986, 1990–1991, 1997–2001, 2003–2007, 2009–2010, 2014, 2018–2019, 2021–2023, 2025–2026
9	Ford	1965, 1993–1996, 2011–2012, 2015, 2024
4	Pontiac	1987, 1989, 1992, 2002
4	Toyota	2008, 2013, 2016–2017
1	Mercury	1964
1	Buick	1988

Previous race: Cook Out 400	NASCAR Cup Series; Busch Light at The Glen	Next race: Dollar Tree 301
