= 1993 NASCAR Winston Cup Series =

American motorsport season

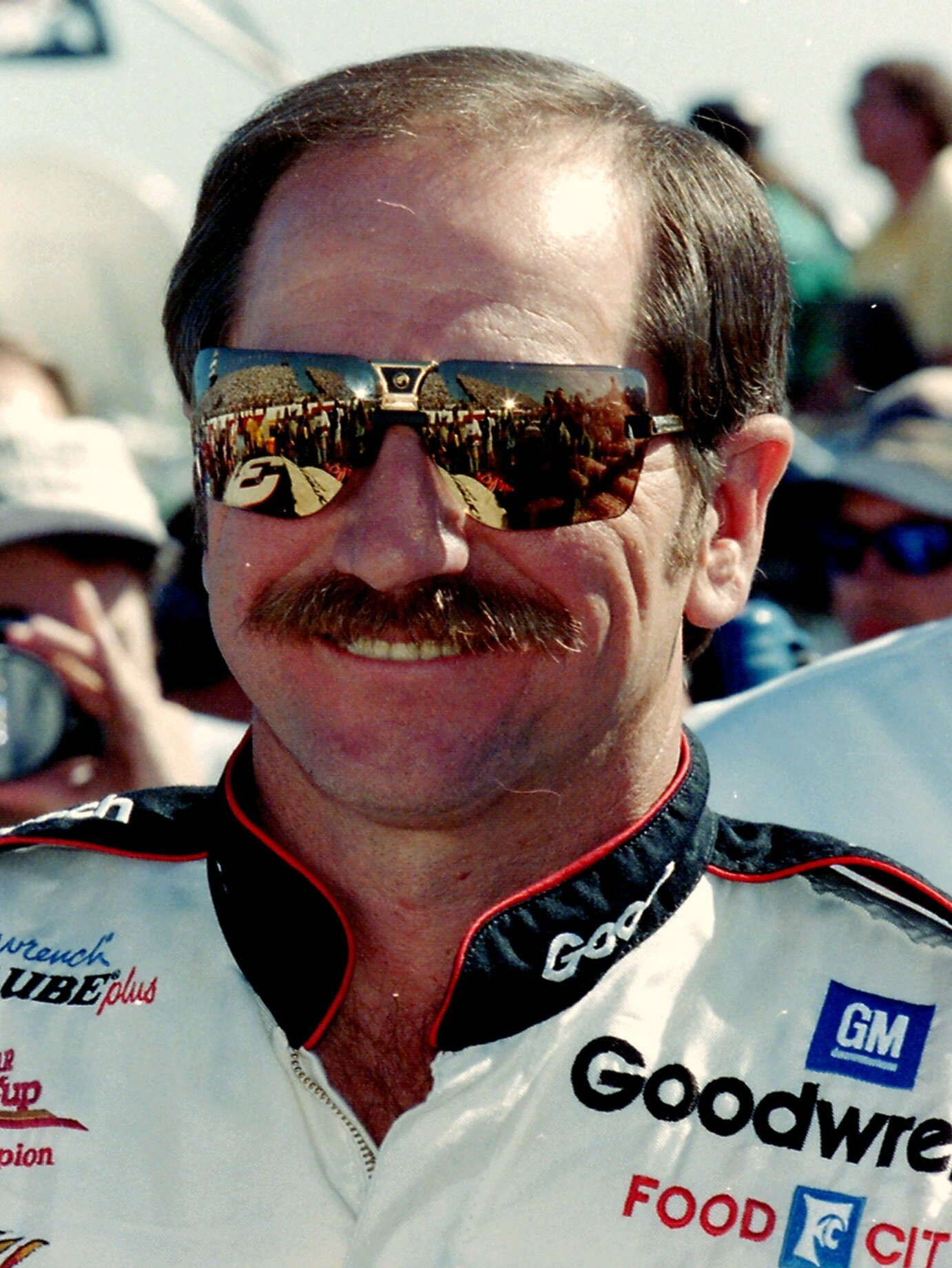
Dale Earnhardt won his sixth of his seven titles.

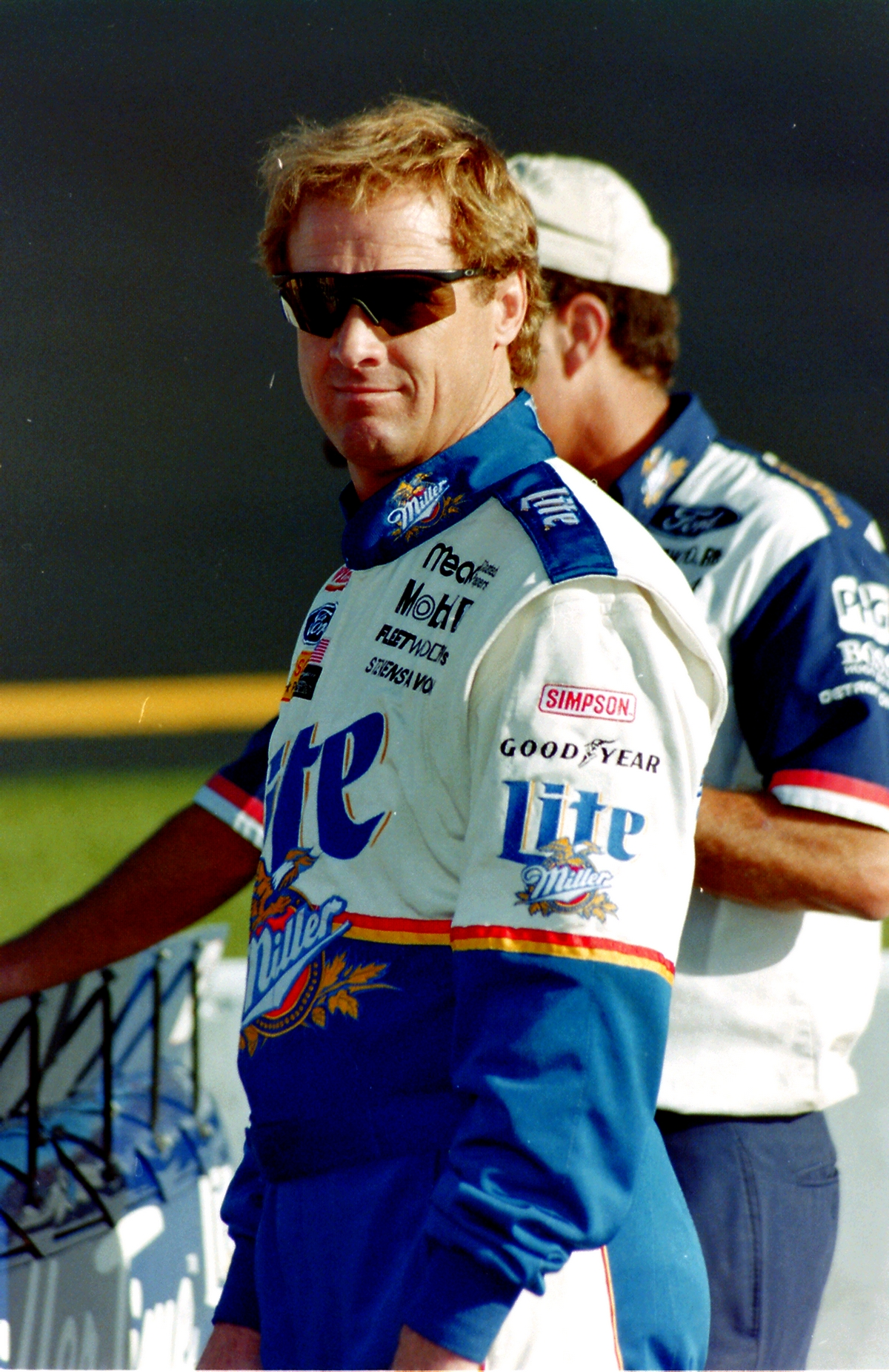
Rusty Wallace finished second in the championship.

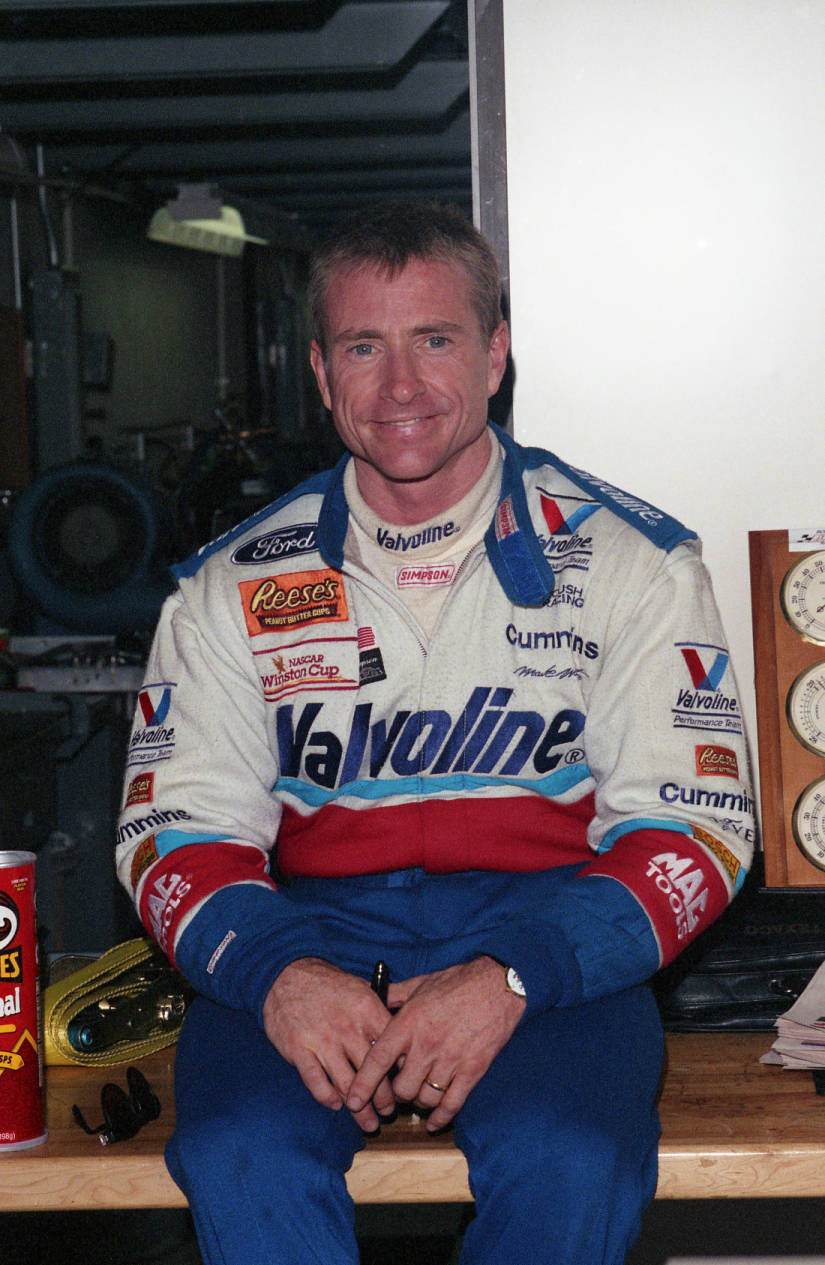
Mark Martin finished third in the championship.

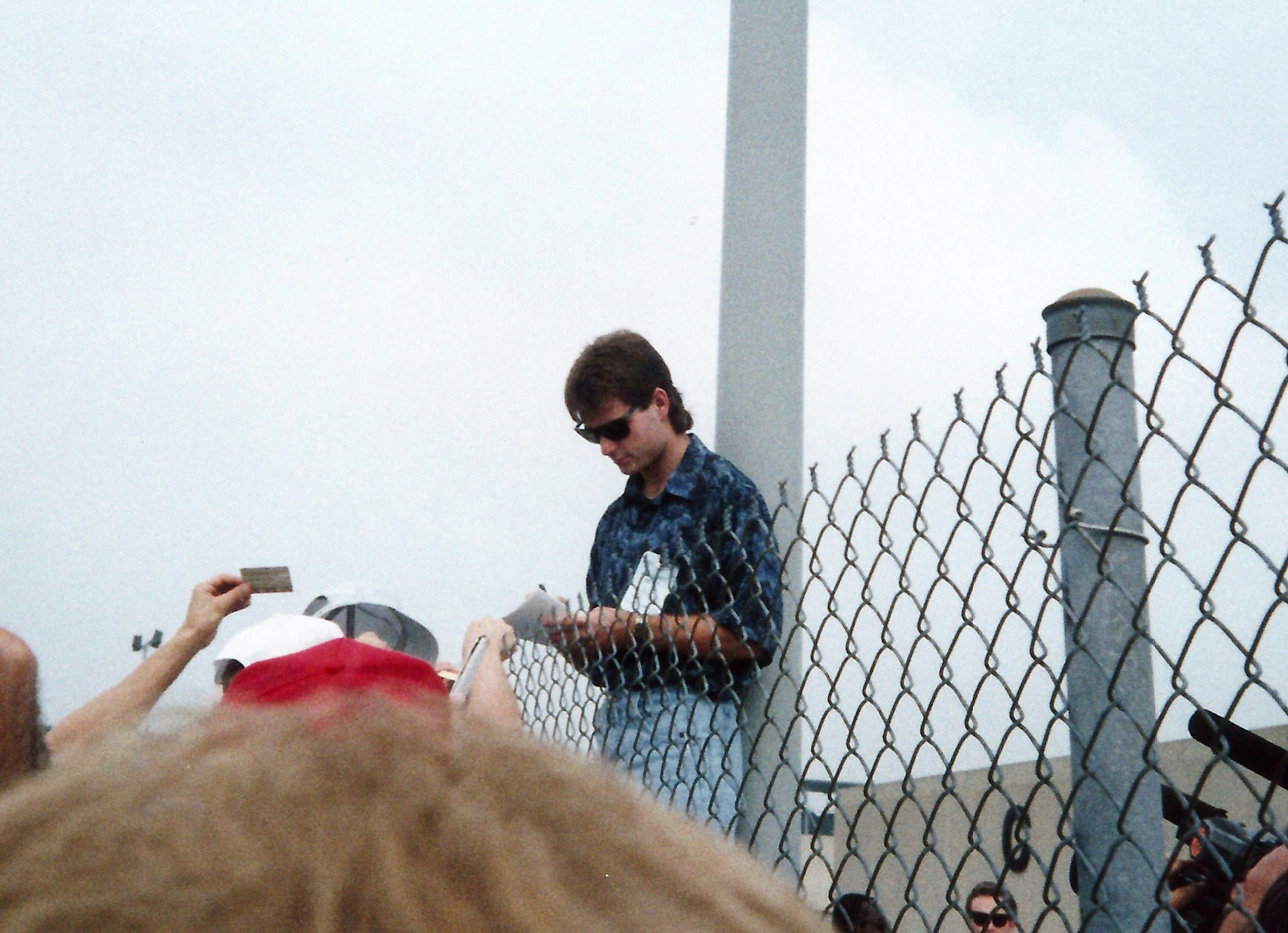
Jeff Gordon, the Winston Cup Rookie of the Year 1993.

The 1993 NASCAR Winston Cup Series was the 45th season of professional stock car racing in the United States and the 22nd modern-era Cup season. The season began on February 7 and ended on November 14. Dale Earnhardt of Richard Childress Racing won the title, the sixth of his career.

1993 was marked by the deaths of two Winston Cup drivers, though neither were on-track in any form. 1992 Champion Alan Kulwicki was killed on April 1 in a plane crash near Blountville, Tennessee. He was travelling to Bristol International Raceway in a corporate plane belonging to his sponsor, Hooters. Davey Allison died on July 13, a day after a helicopter crash at Talladega Superspeedway left him with a severe head trauma. The accidents robbed the sport of two of its brightest young stars and denied Kulwicki the chance to defend his 1992 title; their deaths would be the last for an active NASCAR Cup Series driver during a non-NASCAR race weekend until Kyle Busch's death in 2026.

The season also saw the introduction of electronic scoring, giving instantaneous interval numbers.

== Teams and drivers ==
=== Complete schedule ===
| Manufacturer | Team | No. | Driver | Crew chief |
|---|---|---|---|---|
| Chevrolet | Darrell Waltrip Motorsports | 17 | Darrell Waltrip | Barry Dodson |
| Chevrolet | Hagan Racing | 14 | Terry Labonte | Pete Wright |
| Chevrolet | Hendrick Motorsports | 5 | Ricky Rudd | Gary DeHart |
| Chevrolet | Hendrick Motorsports | 24 | Jeff Gordon (R) | Ray Evernham |
| Chevrolet | Hendrick Motorsports | 25 | Ken Schrader | Ken Howes |
| Chevrolet | Joe Gibbs Racing | 18 | Dale Jarrett | Jimmy Makar |
| Chevrolet | Larry Hedrick Motorsports | 41 | Phil Parsons 25 | Doug Richert |
| Chevrolet | Larry Hedrick Motorsports | 41 | Dick Trickle 5 | Doug Richert |
| Chevrolet | Leo Jackson Motorsports | 33 | Harry Gant | Leo Jackson |
| Chevrolet | Marcis Auto Racing | 71 | Dave Marcis 29 | Dave Fischlein |
| Chevrolet | Marcis Auto Racing | 71 | Terry Fisher 1 | Dave Fischlein |
| Chevrolet | Morgan-McClure Motorsports | 4 | Ernie Irvan 21 | Tony Glover |
| Chevrolet | Morgan-McClure Motorsports | 4 | Jeff Purvis 5 | Tony Glover |
| Chevrolet | Morgan-McClure Motorsports | 4 | Joe Nemechek 2 | Tony Glover |
| Chevrolet | Morgan-McClure Motorsports | 4 | Jimmy Hensley 2 | Tony Glover |
| Chevrolet | Richard Childress Racing | 3 | Dale Earnhardt | Andy Petree |
| Ford | Bill Davis Racing | 22 | Bobby Labonte (R) | Tim Brewer |
| Ford | Bobby Allison Motorsports | 12 | Jimmy Spencer | Jimmy Fennig |
| Ford | Bud Moore Engineering | 15 | Geoff Bodine 23 | Donnie Wingo |
| Ford | Bud Moore Engineering | 15 | Lake Speed 7 | Donnie Wingo |
| Ford | Butch Mock Motorsports | 75 | Dick Trickle 18 | Butch Mock |
| Ford | Butch Mock Motorsports | 75 | Todd Bodine 10 | Butch Mock |
| Ford | Butch Mock Motorsports | 75 | Phil Parsons 1 | Butch Mock |
| Ford | Cale Yarborough Motorsports | 98 | Derrike Cope | Bob Johnson |
| Ford | Donlavey Racing | 90 | Bobby Hillin Jr. | Doug Williams |
| Ford | Junior Johnson & Associates | 11 | Bill Elliott | Mike Beam |
| Ford | Junior Johnson & Associates | 27 | Hut Stricklin | Mike Hill |
| Ford | King Racing | 26 | Brett Bodine 29 | Donnie Richeson |
| Ford | King Racing | 26 | Dick Trickle 1 | Donnie Richeson |
| Ford | Means Racing | 52 | Jimmy Hensley 3 | Bryan Dorsey |
| Ford | Means Racing | 52 | Jimmy Means 22 | Bryan Dorsey |
| Ford | Means Racing | 52 | Scott Gaylord 3 | Bryan Dorsey |
| Ford | Means Racing | 52 | Mike Skinner 1 | Bryan Dorsey |
| Ford | Means Racing | 52 | Mike Wallace 1 | Bryan Dorsey |
| Ford | Precision Products Racing | 1 | Rick Mast | Richard Jackson |
| Ford | RaDiUs Racing | 55 | Ted Musgrave | Sandy Jones |
| Ford | Roush Racing | 6 | Mark Martin | Steve Hmiel |
| Ford | Roush Racing | 16 | Wally Dallenbach Jr. | Howard Comstock |
| Ford | Stavola Brothers Racing | 8 | Sterling Marlin | Ken Wilson |
| Ford | Tri-Star Motorsports | 68 | Bobby Hamilton 8 | Dave Fuge |
| Ford | Tri-Star Motorsports | 68 | Greg Sacks 19 | Dave Fuge |
| Ford | Tri-Star Motorsports | 68 | Dorsey Schroeder 2 | Dave Fuge |
| Ford | Tri-Star Motorsports | 68 | Loy Allen Jr. 1 | Dave Fuge |
| Ford | Wood Brothers Racing | 21 | Morgan Shepherd | Eddie Wood |
| Pontiac | Bahari Racing | 30 | Michael Waltrip | Doug Hewitt |
| Pontiac | Penske Racing | 2 | Rusty Wallace | Buddy Parrott |
| Pontiac | Petty Enterprises | 44 | Rick Wilson 29 | Robbie Loomis |
| Pontiac | Petty Enterprises | 44 | Jimmy Hensley 1 | Robbie Loomis |
| Pontiac | SABCO Racing | 40 | Kenny Wallace (R) | Jeff Hammond |
| Pontiac | SABCO Racing | 42 | Kyle Petty | Robin Pemberton |

=== Limited schedule ===
| Manufacturer | Team | No. | Race driver | Crew chief | Round(s) |
|---|---|---|---|---|---|
| Buick | Sellers Racing | 48 | Jack Sellers | | 1 |
| Chevrolet | Sellers Racing | 48 | Jack Sellers | | 1 |
| Chevrolet | Active Motorsports | 32 | Jimmy Horton | Mike Hillman | 15 |
| Chevrolet | Bahre Racing | 64 | Johnny Chapman | | 1 |
| Chevrolet | Ball Motorsports | 99 | Brad Teague | Ralph Ball | 3 |
| Chevrolet | BS&S Motorsports | 49 | Stanley Smith | | 6 |
| Chevrolet | Chesrown Racing | 37 | Rick Carelli | David Ifft | 1 |
| Chevrolet | Chesrown Racing | 61 | Rick Carelli | David Ifft | 4 |
| Chevrolet | Ferree Racing | 05 | Ed Ferree | | 3 |
| Chevrolet | Folsom Racing | 13 | Stan Fox | | 1 |
| Chevrolet | Folsom Racing | 31 | Stan Fox | | 1 |
| Chevrolet | Folsom Racing | 31 | Steve Kinser | | 2 |
| Chevrolet | Richard Childress Racing | 31 | Neil Bonnett | Andy Petree | 2 |
| Chevrolet | Gilliland Racing | 36 | Butch Gilliland | | 2 |
| Chevrolet | Hendrick Motorsports | 46 | Al Unser Jr. | Waddell Wilson | 1 |
| Chevrolet | Hendrick Motorsports | 46 | Buddy Baker | | 1 |
| Chevrolet | Jeanie Hunt | 56 | Tony Hunt | | 1 |
| Chevrolet | Hill Motorsports | 56 | Jerry Hill | | 5 |
| Chevrolet | JTC Racing | 50 | Mike Chase | | 1 |
| Chevrolet | McClure Racing | 83 | Jeff McClure | | 1 |
| Chevrolet | McClure Racing | 29 | Jeff McClure | | 1 |
| Chevrolet | Linro Motorsports | 29 | Kerry Teague | | 6 |
| Chevrolet | Linro Motorsports | 29 | John Krebs | | 1 |
| Chevrolet | Diamond Ridge Motorsports | 29 | John Krebs | | 1 |
| Chevrolet | Diamond Ridge Motorsports | 29 | Andy Hillenburg | | 1 |
| Chevrolet | Diamond Ridge Motorsports | 29 | Steve Grissom | | 1 |
| Chevrolet | Diamond Ridge Motorsports | 99 | John Krebs | | 1 |
| Chevrolet | Aroneck Racing | 65 | Jerry O'Neil | Dennis Conner | 2 |
| Chevrolet | O'Neil Racing | 65 | Jerry O'Neil | Dennis Conner | 2 |
| Chevrolet | NEMCO Motorsports | 87 | Joe Nemechek | | 3 |
| Chevrolet | Phoenix Racing | 51 | Jeff Purvis | Marc Reno | 4 |
| Chevrolet | Scribner Engineering | 51 | Rick Scribner | | 2 |
| Chevrolet | Spears Motorsports | 76 | Bill Sedgwick | | 1 |
| Chevrolet | Spears Motorsports | 76 | Ron Hornaday Jr. | | 2 |
| Chevrolet | TTC Motrosports Inc. | 04 | Hershel McGriff | | 1 |
| Chevrolet | Tex Racing | 72 | John Andretti | | 5 |
| Chevrolet | Venturini Motorsports | 35 | Bill Venturini | | 2 |
| Chevrolet | Barkdoll Racing | 73 | Stanley Smith | | 1 |
| Chevrolet | Barkdoll Racing | 73 | Phil Barkdoll | | 1 |
| Oldsmobile | Barkdoll Racing | 73 | Phil Barkdoll | | 1 |
| Oldsmobile | B&B Racing | 23 | Eddie Bierschwale | | 2 |
| Oldsmobile | Norm Benning Racing | 84 | Norm Benning | Frank Perpetua | 1 |
| Oldsmobile | O'Neil Racing | 63 | Norm Benning | Frank Perpetua | 4 |
| Oldsmobile | O'Neil Racing | 65 | Jerry O'Neil | Dennis Conner | 3 |
| Oldsmobile | Stringer Motorsports | 57 | Bob Schacht | Mike Mack | 5 |
| Oldsmobile | Woodland Racing | 86 | Rich Woodland Jr. | Jim Benison | 1 |
| Ford | AK Racing | 7 | Alan Kulwicki | Paul Andrews | 5 |
| Ford | AK Racing | 7 | Jimmy Hensley | Paul Andrews | 15 |
| Ford | AK Racing | 7 | Tommy Kendall | Paul Andrews | 2 |
| Ford | Geoff Bodine Racing | 7 | Geoff Bodine | Paul Andrews | 7 |
| Ford | Allen Racing | 37 | Loy Allen Jr. | | 7 |
| Ford | Akins Motorsports | 38 | Bobby Hamilton | Dick Meyer | 4 |
| Ford | Andy Belmont Racing | 79 | Andy Belmont | Pat Rissi | 1 |
| Ford | Ball Motorsports | 99 | Brad Teague | Ralph Ball | 1 |
| Ford | Circle Bar Racing | 84 | Rick Crawford | | 3 |
| Ford | Petty Brothers Racing | 53 | Ritchie Petty | | 5 |
| Ford | Jimmy Means Racing | 53 | Mike Potter | | 1 |
| Ford | Jimmy Means Racing | 53 | Graham Taylor | | 1 |
| Ford | Jimmy Means Racing | 53 | Jimmy Means | | 1 |
| Ford | Jimmy Means Racing | 62 | John McFadden | | 1 |
| Ford | Jimmy Means Racing | 62 | Clay Young | | 5 |
| Ford | Gray Racing | 62 | Clay Young | | 2 |
| Ford | Gray Racing | 62 | Ben Hess | | 1 |
| Ford | Gray Racing | 77 | Davy Jones | | 1 |
| Ford | Gray Racing | 77 | Mike Potter | Steven Gray | 3 |
| Ford | Balough Racing | 77 | Mike Potter | Steven Gray | 1 |
| Ford | H. L. Waters Racing | 0 | Delma Cowart | Phillip Branch | 3 |
| Ford | FILMAR Racing | 0 | Jeff Burton | | 1 |
| Ford | TTC Motrosports Inc. | 45 | Rich Bickle | Phil Hammer | 13 |
| Ford | Gray Racing | 86 | Mark Thompson | | 1 |
| Ford | Hover Motorsports | 80 | Jimmy Horton | | 2 |
| Ford | Jeff Davis | 81 | Jeff Davis | | 5 |
| Ford | Mansion Motorsports | 85 | Dorsey Schroeder | Ed Katera | 1 |
| Ford | Mansion Motorsports | 85 | Ken Bouchard | Ed Katera | 7 |
| Ford | Mansion Motorsports | 85 | Bob Schacht | Ed Katera | 1 |
| Ford | Mansion Motorsports | 85 | Jim Sauter | Ed Katera | 1 |
| Ford | Melling Racing | 9 | Chad Little | Harry Hyde | 2 |
| Ford | Melling Racing | 9 | Greg Sacks | Harry Hyde | 1 |
| Ford | Melling Racing | 9 | P. J. Jones (R) | Harry Hyde | 11 |
| Ford | Moroso Racing | 20 | Joe Ruttman | Dick Meyer | 5 |
| Ford | Moroso Racing | 20 | Bobby Hamilton | Dick Meyer | 5 |
| Ford | Mueller Brothers Racing | 89 | Jim Sauter | Terry Allen | 3 |
| Ford | Owen Racing | 66 | Mike Wallace | | 1 |
| Ford | Robert Yates Racing | 28 | Davey Allison | Larry McReynolds | 16 |
| Ford | Robert Yates Racing | 28 | Robby Gordon | Larry McReynolds | 1 |
| Ford | Robert Yates Racing | 28 | Lake Speed | Larry McReynolds | 3 |
| Ford | Robert Yates Racing | 28 | Ernie Irvan | Larry McReynolds | 9 |
| Ford | Sadler Brothers Racing | 95 | Ken Ragan | | 1 |
| Ford | Sadler Brothers Racing | 95 | Jeremy Mayfield | | 4 |
| Ford | Schmitt Racing | 73 | Bill Schmitt | | 1 |
| Ford | Speed Racing | 83 | Lake Speed | Troy Selberg | 12 |
| Ford | Stahl Racing | 82 | Mark Stahl | | 1 |
| Ford | Standridge Motorsports | 47 | Billy Standridge | | 3 |
| Ford | Taylor Racing | 02 | T. W. Taylor | Jeff Buckner | 7 |
| Ford | Team Jones Racing | 50 | A. J. Foyt | Bobby Jones | 1 |
| Ford | Tom Craigen | 20 | Dirk Stephens | Tom Craigen | 2 |
| Ford | Triad Motorsports | 78 | Jay Hedgecock | | 3 |
| Ford | Stavola Brothers Racing | 48 | James Hylton | James Hylton Jr. | 1 |
| Pontiac | Hylton Motorsports | 48 | James Hylton | James Hylton Jr. | 10 |
| Pontiac | Hylton Motorsports | 48 | Trevor Boys | James Hylton Jr. | 4 |
| Pontiac | Genzman Racing | 48 | Andy Genzman | James Hylton Jr. | 2 |
| Pontiac | Bahre Racing | 64 | Johnny Chapman | | 1 |
| Pontiac | Bailey Racing | 36 | H. B. Bailey | | 2 |
| Pontiac | Midgley Racing | 09 | R. K. Smith | | 1 |
| Pontiac | Jacks Motorsports | 58 | Wayne Jacks | | 2 |
| Pontiac | Owen Racing | 66 | Mike Wallace | | 3 |

== Schedule ==
| No. | Race title | Track | Date |
|---|---|---|---|
| NC | Busch Clash | Daytona International Speedway, Daytona Beach | February 7 |
| NC | Gatorade Twin 125 Qualifiers | Daytona International Speedway, Daytona Beach | February 11 |
| 1 | Daytona 500 | Daytona International Speedway, Daytona Beach | February 14 |
| 2 | GM Goodwrench 500 | North Carolina Motor Speedway, Rockingham | February 28 |
| 3 | Pontiac Excitement 400 | Richmond International Raceway, Richmond | March 7 |
| 4 | Motorcraft Quality Parts 500* | Atlanta Motor Speedway, Hampton | March 20 |
| 5 | TranSouth 500 | Darlington Raceway, Darlington | March 28 |
| 6 | Food City 500 | Bristol International Raceway, Bristol | April 4 |
| 7 | First Union 400 | North Wilkesboro Speedway, North Wilkesboro | April 18 |
| 8 | Hanes 500 | Martinsville Speedway, Ridgeway | April 25 |
| 9 | Winston 500 | Talladega Superspeedway, Talladega | May 2 |
| 10 | Save Mart Supermarkets 300K | Sears Point Raceway, Sonoma | May 16 |
| NC | Winston Open | Charlotte Motor Speedway, Concord | May 22 |
| NC | The Winston | Charlotte Motor Speedway, Concord | May 22 |
| 11 | Coca-Cola 600 | Charlotte Motor Speedway, Concord | May 30 |
| 12 | Budweiser 500 | Dover Downs International Speedway, Dover | June 6 |
| 13 | Champion Spark Plug 500 | Pocono International Raceway, Long Pond | June 13 |
| 14 | Miller Genuine Draft 400 | Michigan International Speedway, Brooklyn | June 20 |
| 15 | Pepsi 400 | Daytona International Speedway, Daytona Beach | July 3 |
| 16 | Slick 50 300 | New Hampshire International Speedway, Loudon | July 11 |
| 17 | Miller Genuine Draft 500 | Pocono International Raceway, Long Pond | July 18 |
| 18 | DieHard 500 | Talladega Superspeedway, Talladega | July 25 |
| 19 | The Bud at The Glen | Watkins Glen International, Watkins Glen | August 8 |
| 20 | Champion Spark Plug 400 | Michigan International Speedway, Brooklyn | August 15 |
| 21 | Bud 500 | Bristol International Raceway, Bristol | August 28 |
| 22 | Mountain Dew Southern 500 | Darlington Raceway, Darlington | September 5 |
| 23 | Miller Genuine Draft 400 | Richmond International Raceway, Richmond | September 11 |
| 24 | SplitFire Spark Plug 500 | Dover Downs International Speedway, Dover | September 19 |
| 25 | Goody's 500 | Martinsville Speedway, Ridgeway | September 26 |
| 26 | Tyson/Holly Farms 400 | North Wilkesboro Speedway, North Wilkesboro | October 3 |
| 27 | Mello Yello 500 | Charlotte Motor Speedway, Concord | October 10 |
| 28 | AC Delco 500 | North Carolina Motor Speedway, Rockingham | October 24 |
| 29 | Slick 50 500 | Phoenix International Raceway, Phoenix | October 31 |
| 30 | Hooters 500 | Atlanta Motor Speedway, Hampton | November 14 |

- Race scheduled for March 14, but postponed due to the 1993 Storm of the Century.

== Races ==
| No. | Race | Pole position | Most laps led | Winning driver | Manufacturer |
|---|---|---|---|---|---|
| | Busch Clash | Ernie Irvan | Dale Earnhardt | Dale Earnhardt | Chevrolet |
| | Gatorade Twin 125 #1 | Kyle Petty | Jeff Gordon | Jeff Gordon | Chevrolet |
| | Gatorade Twin 125 #2 | Dale Jarrett | Dale Earnhardt | Dale Earnhardt | Chevrolet |
| 1 | Daytona 500 | Kyle Petty | Dale Earnhardt | Dale Jarrett | Chevrolet |
| 2 | GM Goodwrench 500 | Mark Martin | Rusty Wallace | Rusty Wallace | Pontiac |
| 3 | Pontiac Excitement 400 | Ken Schrader | Kyle Petty | Davey Allison | Ford |
| 4 | Motorcraft Quality Parts 500 | Rusty Wallace | Mark Martin | Morgan Shepherd | Ford |
| 5 | TranSouth 500 | Dale Earnhardt | Dale Earnhardt | Dale Earnhardt | Chevrolet |
| 6 | Food City 500 | Rusty Wallace | Rusty Wallace | Rusty Wallace | Pontiac |
| 7 | First Union 400 | Brett Bodine | Sterling Marlin | Rusty Wallace | Pontiac |
| 8 | Hanes 500 | Geoff Bodine | Rusty Wallace | Rusty Wallace | Pontiac |
| 9 | Winston 500 | Dale Earnhardt | Dale Earnhardt | Ernie Irvan | Chevrolet |
| 10 | Save Mart Supermarkets 300K | Dale Earnhardt | Dale Earnhardt | Geoff Bodine | Ford |
| | Winston Open | Jeff Gordon | Jeff Gordon | Sterling Marlin | Ford |
| | The Winston | Ernie Irvan | Ernie Irvan | Dale Earnhardt | Chevrolet |
| 11 | Coca-Cola 600 | Ken Schrader | Dale Earnhardt | Dale Earnhardt | Chevrolet |
| 12 | Budweiser 500 | Ernie Irvan | Dale Earnhardt | Dale Earnhardt | Chevrolet |
| 13 | Champion Spark Plug 500 | Ken Schrader | Kyle Petty | Kyle Petty | Pontiac |
| 14 | Miller Genuine Draft 400 | Brett Bodine | Mark Martin | Ricky Rudd | Chevrolet |
| 15 | Pepsi 400 | Ernie Irvan | Dale Earnhardt | Dale Earnhardt | Chevrolet |
| 16 | Slick 50 300 | Mark Martin | Sterling Marlin | Rusty Wallace | Pontiac |
| 17 | Miller Genuine Draft 500 | Ken Schrader | Dale Earnhardt | Dale Earnhardt | Chevrolet |
| 18 | DieHard 500 | Bill Elliott | Dale Earnhardt | Dale Earnhardt | Chevrolet |
| 19 | Budweiser at The Glen | Mark Martin | Mark Martin | Mark Martin | Ford |
| 20 | Champion Spark Plug 400 | Ken Schrader | Ricky Rudd | Mark Martin | Ford |
| 21 | Bud 500 | Mark Martin | Rusty Wallace | Mark Martin | Ford |
| 22 | Mountain Dew Southern 500 | Ken Schrader | Mark Martin | Mark Martin | Ford |
| 23 | Miller Genuine Draft 400 | Bobby Labonte | Rusty Wallace | Rusty Wallace | Pontiac |
| 24 | SplitFire Spark Plug 500 | Rusty Wallace | Rusty Wallace | Rusty Wallace | Pontiac |
| 25 | Goody's 500 | Ernie Irvan | Ernie Irvan | Ernie Irvan | Ford |
| 26 | Tyson Holly Farms 400 | Ernie Irvan | Rusty Wallace | Rusty Wallace | Pontiac |
| 27 | Mello Yello 500 | Jeff Gordon | Ernie Irvan | Ernie Irvan | Ford |
| 28 | AC Delco 500 | Mark Martin | Rusty Wallace | Rusty Wallace | Pontiac |
| 29 | Slick 50 500 | Bill Elliott | Mark Martin | Mark Martin | Ford |
| 30 | Hooters 500 | Harry Gant | Rusty Wallace | Rusty Wallace | Pontiac |

=== Busch Clash ===
The Busch Clash, an invitational event for all pole winners of the previous season, was held February 7 at Daytona International Speedway. Ernie Irvan drew the pole.

Top ten results

1. #3 - Dale Earnhardt
2. #25 - Ken Schrader
3. #4 - Ernie Irvan
4. #6 - Mark Martin
5. #5 - Ricky Rudd
6. #28 - Davey Allison
7. #42 - Kyle Petty
8. #8 - Sterling Marlin
9. #11 - Bill Elliott
10. #7 - Alan Kulwicki

=== Gatorade 125s ===
The Gatorade 125s, qualifying races for the Daytona 500, were held February 11 at Daytona International Speedway. Kyle Petty and Dale Jarrett won the poles for both races, respectively.

Race one: top ten results

1. #24 - Jeff Gordon*
2. #11 - Bill Elliott
3. #42 - Kyle Petty
4. #25 - Ken Schrader
5. #90 - Bobby Hillin Jr.
6. #28 - Davey Allison
7. #83 - Lake Speed
8. #44 - Rick Wilson
9. #9 - Chad Little
10. #14 - Terry Labonte

Race two: top ten results

1. #3 - Dale Earnhardt
2. #15 - Geoff Bodine
3. #18 - Dale Jarrett
4. #4 - Ernie Irvan
5. #7 - Alan Kulwicki
6. #5 - Ricky Rudd
7. #8 - Sterling Marlin
8. #41 - Phil Parsons
9. #27 - Hut Stricklin
10. #26 - Brett Bodine
- With his win in Race 1, Jeff Gordon became the first rookie in NASCAR's modern era to win a Daytona 500 qualifying race.

=== Daytona 500 by STP ===
The 1993 Daytona 500 by STP was held February 14 at Daytona International Speedway. Kyle Petty won the pole, the first Daytona 500 pole for the Petty family since 1966, and only the second time ever. His father Richard waved the green flag in the first Winston Cup race held since his retirement.

Top ten results

1. #18 - Dale Jarrett*
2. #3 - Dale Earnhardt
3. #15 - Geoff Bodine
4. #27 - Hut Stricklin
5. #24 - Jeff Gordon*
6. #6 - Mark Martin
7. #21 - Morgan Shepherd
8. #25 - Ken Schrader
9. #8 - Sterling Marlin
10. #16 - Wally Dallenbach Jr.

Failed to qualify: #85 - Dorsey Schroeder, #48 - James Hylton, #45 - Rich Bickle, #29 - Kerry Teague, #0 - Delma Cowart, #77 - Mike Potter, #73 - Stanley Smith, #99 - Brad Teague, #31 - Steve Kinser, #51 - Jeff Purvis, #50 - A. J. Foyt, #23 - Eddie Bierschwale, #95 - Ken Ragan

- The race was marked by a grinding crash involving Rusty Wallace who was spun out by Michael Waltrip on the backstretch and sent Wallace on a series of horrific barrel rolls in the grass. He was uninjured although.
- Jeff Gordon's run in his first Daytona 500 start is considered one of the most successful Daytona 500 debuts ever. He became the first rookie to win one of the qualifying races, led the 1st lap in the main event, and finished 5th.
- The "Dale and Dale Show" commenced as Jarrett passed Earnhardt in the tri-oval as they took the white flag. As the leaders exited Turn 2, the CBS Sports producers came on the headsets of Ken Squier, Neil Bonnett, and Ned Jarrett, telling Ned to "call his son home", leading to an emotional finish.
- Jarrett's victory was also the first Cup Series victory for team owner Joe Gibbs.
- This was the first Daytona 500 not to feature Richard Petty as a driver in the starting lineup since 1965.
- Open-wheel veteran Al Unser Jr. made is only NASCAR start in this race, driving the #46 Valvoline Chevy for Hendrick Motorsports. Unser made it into the race on speed after crashing in the qualifying race, but crashed on lap 157 and finished 36th.

=== GM Goodwrench 500 ===
The GM Goodwrench 500 was held on February 28 at North Carolina Speedway. Mark Martin won the pole.

Top ten results

1. #2 - Rusty Wallace
2. #3 - Dale Earnhardt
3. #4 - Ernie Irvan
4. #7 - Alan Kulwicki
5. #6 - Mark Martin
6. #18 - Dale Jarrett
7. #55 - Ted Musgrave
8. #41 - Phil Parsons
9. #15 - Geoff Bodine, 1 lap down
10. #14 - Terry Labonte, 1 lap down

Failed to qualify: #49 - Stanley Smith

=== Pontiac Excitement 400 ===
The Pontiac Excitement 400 was held March 7 at Richmond International Raceway. Ken Schrader won the pole.

Top ten results

1. #28 - Davey Allison*
2. #2 - Rusty Wallace
3. #7 - Alan Kulwicki*
4. #18 - Dale Jarrett
5. #42 - Kyle Petty
6. #24 - Jeff Gordon
7. #6 - Mark Martin
8. #17 - Darrell Waltrip
9. #33 - Harry Gant
10. #3 - Dale Earnhardt, 1 lap down

Failed to qualify: #45 - Rich Bickle

- This would be Davey Allison's final Winston Cup win.
- Last career Top 5 for Alan Kulwicki.

=== Motorcraft Quality Parts 500 ===
The Motorcraft Quality Parts 500 was scheduled for March 14 at Atlanta Motor Speedway. However, it was postponed and moved to March 20 in the aftermath of the 1993 Storm of the Century. Rusty Wallace won the pole.

Top ten results

1. #21 - Morgan Shepherd*
2. #4 - Ernie Irvan
3. #2 - Rusty Wallace
4. #24 - Jeff Gordon*, 1 lap down
5. #5 - Ricky Rudd, 1 lap down
6. #15 - Geoff Bodine, 1 lap down
7. #42 - Kyle Petty, 1 lap down
8. #26 - Brett Bodine, 1 lap down
9. #11 - Bill Elliott, 2 laps down
10. #12 - Jimmy Spencer, 3 laps down

Failed to qualify: #45 - Rich Bickle, #84 - Rick Crawford, #48 - James Hylton, #61 - Rick Carelli

- Jeff Gordon appeared headed to his first Winston Cup win until during the last pit stop he went past his pit box line and had to back up losing too much time, then scraping the wall trying to stay ahead of Rusty Wallace.
- This was Morgan Shepherd's fourth and final career NASCAR Cup Series victory, and his third at Atlanta Motor Speedway.
- This would be Wood Brothers Racing's last victory in a Cup Series points race until Bristol in March 2001.
- This would the last time a Cup Series race to be postponed due to snow until the 2018 Martinsville spring race.
- This race was originally scheduled to air on ABC; however by the time the race was rescheduled, ABC was unable to carry the race due to scheduling conflicts, resulting in the broadcast airing on TNN instead.

=== TranSouth 500 ===
The TranSouth 500 was held March 28 at Darlington Raceway. Qualifying was rained out and the starting grid was lined up based on points. Dale Earnhardt started from the pole.

Top ten results

1. #3 - Dale Earnhardt
2. #6 - Mark Martin
3. #18 - Dale Jarrett
4. #25 - Ken Schrader
5. #2 - Rusty Wallace, 1 lap down
6. #7 - Alan Kulwicki*, 1 lap down
7. #42 - Kyle Petty, 1 lap down
8. #15 - Geoff Bodine, 1 lap down
9. #14 - Terry Labonte, 1 lap down
10. #21 - Morgan Shepherd, 2 laps down

Failed to qualify: #62 - John McFadden

- This was the last Darlington spring race to be 500 miles until 2005.
- This was Alan Kulwicki's final NASCAR race before his death four days later.

=== Food City 500 ===
The Food City 500 was held April 4 at Bristol International Raceway. Rusty Wallace won the pole. The weekend was marked by the death of reigning series champion Alan Kulwicki. Three days earlier, Kulwicki and three Hooters executives were killed in a plane crash on their way to this race.

Top ten results

1. #2 - Rusty Wallace*
2. #3 - Dale Earnhardt
3. #42 - Kyle Petty
4. #12 - Jimmy Spencer
5. #28 - Davey Allison
6. #17 - Darrell Waltrip
7. #21 - Morgan Shepherd, 1 lap down
8. #6 - Mark Martin, 2 laps down
9. #26 - Brett Bodine, 3 laps down
10. #1 - Rick Mast, 3 laps down

Failed to qualify: #48 - James Hylton Withdrawn: #7 - Alan Kulwicki

- After taking the checkered flag, Rusty Wallace made a Polish Victory Lap in memory of Alan Kulwicki who made it famous.
- After being spun out by Bobby Hillin Jr., Dale Jarrett threw his helmet at the #90 car during the caution period that ran from lap 210 to 216.
- This was the first Spring race at Bristol since switching from asphalt to its present concrete surface.

=== First Union 400 ===
The First Union 400 was held April 18 at North Wilkesboro Speedway. Brett Bodine won the pole.

Top ten results

1. #2 - Rusty Wallace
2. #42 - Kyle Petty
3. #25 - Ken Schrader
4. #28 - Davey Allison
5. #17 - Darrell Waltrip
6. #14 - Terry Labonte
7. #5 - Ricky Rudd
8. #21 - Morgan Shepherd
9. #8 - Sterling Marlin
10. #11 - Bill Elliott, 2 laps down

Failed to qualify: #49 - Stanley Smith

- AK Racing returned to competition in this race, with Jimmy Hensley filling in as interim substitute driver for the #7 team.
- The biggest news story of the week leading up to the race was the official announcement of the inaugural Brickyard 400, scheduled for 6 August 1994.

=== Hanes 500 ===
The Hanes 500 was held April 25 at Martinsville Speedway. Geoff Bodine won the pole.

Top ten results

1. #2 - Rusty Wallace*
2. #28 - Davey Allison
3. #18 - Dale Jarrett
4. #17 - Darrell Waltrip
5. #42 - Kyle Petty, 1 lap down
6. #15 - Geoff Bodine, 3 laps down
7. #26 - Brett Bodine, 3 laps down
8. #24 - Jeff Gordon, 3 laps down
9. #14 - Terry Labonte, 3 laps down
10. #6 - Mark Martin, 4 laps down

Failed to qualify: #52 - Jimmy Means, #9 - P. J. Jones

- As of today, Rusty Wallace is the most recent driver in NASCAR to score 3 consecutive short track wins.

=== Winston 500 ===
The Winston 500 was held May 2 at Talladega Superspeedway. Dale Earnhardt won the pole.

Top ten results

1. #4 - Ernie Irvan*
2. #12 - Jimmy Spencer
3. #18 - Dale Jarrett
4. #3 - Dale Earnhardt
5. #20 - Joe Ruttman
6. #2 - Rusty Wallace*
7. #28 - Davey Allison
8. #98 - Derrike Cope
9. #7 - Jimmy Hensley
10. #30 - Michael Waltrip

Failed to qualify: #9 - P. J. Jones, #48 - James Hylton, #0 - Delma Cowart, #31 - Steve Kinser, #62 - Ben Hess, #71 - Dave Marcis, #73 - Phil Barkdoll, #65 - Jerry O'Neil, #49 - Stanley Smith

- On the final lap approaching the checkered flag, Rusty Wallace was spun by Dale Earnhardt and flipped violently across the finish line. Earnhardt proceeded to check on him while on his cooldown lap. Wallace suffered a broken left wrist, and bruised ribs in the accident.
- This would be Ernie Irvan's last victory driving for Morgan-McClure Motorsports.

=== Save Mart Supermarkets 300K ===
The Save Mart Supermarkets 300K was held May 16 at Sears Point Raceway. Dale Earnhardt won the pole.

Top ten results

1. #15 - Geoff Bodine*
2. #4 - Ernie Irvan
3. #5 - Ricky Rudd
4. #25 - Ken Schrader
5. #42 - Kyle Petty
6. #3 - Dale Earnhardt*
7. #16 - Wally Dallenbach Jr.
8. #44 - Rick Wilson
9. #14 - Terry Labonte
10. #27 - Hut Stricklin

Failed to qualify: #51 - Rick Scribner, #09 - R. K. Smith, #48 - Jack Sellers

- This was the last victory for Bud Moore team.
- Geoff Bodine celebrated the victory at the same time as he was finalizing a deal to purchase the assets to the late Alan Kulwicki's team.
- Dale Earnhardt retook the championship lead in this race after points leader Rusty Wallace finished 38th due to overheating and transmission issues. Earnhardt would lead the standings for the rest of the year.

=== The Winston Open ===
The Winston Open, a 50 lap last chance race to qualify for The Winston, was held on May 22 at Charlotte Motor Speedway. Jeff Gordon won the pole. The top four finishers would qualify for The Winston later that night.

Top five results

1. #8 - Sterling Marlin
2. #25 - Ken Schrader
3. #26 - Brett Bodine
4. #30 - Michael Waltrip
5. #1 - Rick Mast
- Jeff Gordon lead the first 22 laps until he crashed out of the race on lap 23.

=== The Winston ===
The 1993 edition of The Winston, took place on May 22. Ernie Irvan won the pole.

==== Criteria to qualify ====
- All active 1992 and 1993 race winning drivers.
- All active 1992 and 1993 race winning car owners.
- All active former Winston Cup Champions.
- Top 4 finishers from The Winston Open

Top ten results

1. #3 - Dale Earnhardt*
2. #6 - Mark Martin
3. #4 - Ernie Irvan
4. #25 - Ken Schrader
5. #15 - Geoff Bodine
6. #17 - Darrell Waltrip
7. #8 - Sterling Marlin
8. #2 - Rusty Wallace
9. #28 - Davey Allison
10. #26 - Brett Bodine
- Dale Earnhardt's victory made the first three-time winner of this race. Earnhardt led only the final two laps.
- Richard Childress Racing also became the first team to win this race three times.

=== Coca-Cola 600 ===
The Coca-Cola 600 was held May 30 at Charlotte Motor Speedway. Ken Schrader won the pole.

Top ten results

1. #3 - Dale Earnhardt*
2. #24 - Jeff Gordon
3. #18 - Dale Jarrett
4. #25 - Ken Schrader
5. #4 - Ernie Irvan
6. #11 - Bill Elliott
7. #12 - Jimmy Spencer
8. #22 - Bobby Labonte
9. #21 - Morgan Shepherd, 1 lap down
10. #15 - Geoff Bodine, 1 lap down

Failed to qualify: #85 - Ken Bouchard, #48 - James Hylton, #84 - Rick Crawford, #38 - Bobby Hamilton, #65 - Jerry O'Neil, #49 - Stanley Smith, #64 - Johnny Chapman

- Dale Earnhardt overcame two penalties (one for speeding on pit road, the other for wrecking Greg Sacks on a restart) to win his third Coca-Cola 600.
- This was the first Coca-Cola 600 to have a late afternoon start, and end at night, meaning the race was no longer run at the same time as the Indianapolis 500.

=== Budweiser 500 ===
The Budweiser 500 was held June 6 at Dover Downs International Speedway. Ernie Irvan won the pole, but had to start in the back after crashing in final practice.

Top ten results

1. #3 - Dale Earnhardt
2. #18 - Dale Jarrett
3. #28 - Davey Allison
4. #6 - Mark Martin
5. #25 - Ken Schrader
6. #1 - Rick Mast
7. #33 - Harry Gant, 1 lap down
8. #12 - Jimmy Spencer, 1 lap down
9. #21 - Morgan Shepherd, 2 laps down
10. #38 - Bobby Hamilton, 5 laps down

Failed to qualify: #80 - Jimmy Horton, #56 - Jerry Hill, #85 - Ken Bouchard

=== Champion Spark Plug 500 ===
The Champion Spark Plug 500 was held June 13 at Pocono Raceway. Ken Schrader won the pole.

Top ten results

1. #42 - Kyle Petty
2. #25 - Ken Schrader
3. #33 - Harry Gant
4. #12 - Jimmy Spencer
5. #55 - Ted Musgrave
6. #28 - Davey Allison
7. #21 - Morgan Shepherd
8. #8 - Sterling Marlin
9. #5 - Ricky Rudd
10. #11 - Bill Elliott

Failed to qualify: #80 - Jimmy Horton

- During the race, a fan later identified as Chad Blaine Kohl, ran onto the track as Kyle Petty and Davey Allison were battling for the lead; narrowly avoiding being hit. Kohl would eventually be charged with arson, risking a catastrophe, criminal mischief, disorderly conduct and public drunkenness.

=== Miller Genuine Draft 400 ===
The Miller Genuine Draft 400 was held June 20 at Michigan International Speedway. Brett Bodine won the pole.

Top ten results

1. #5 - Ricky Rudd*
2. #24 - Jeff Gordon
3. #4 - Ernie Irvan
4. #18 - Dale Jarrett
5. #2 - Rusty Wallace
6. #6 - Mark Martin*
7. #21 - Morgan Shepherd
8. #8 - Sterling Marlin
9. #11 - Bill Elliott
10. #33 - Harry Gant

Failed to qualify: #48 - Trevor Boys, #81 - Jeff Davis

- Mark Martin was leading when he ran out of fuel with 9 laps to go, handing Ricky Rudd the lead, who would go on to win.
- This was Rudd's final victory for Hendrick Motorsports as he would leave the team at seasons end to form his own team.

=== Pepsi 400 ===
The Pepsi 400 was held July 3 at Daytona International Speedway. Ernie Irvan won the pole.

Top ten results

1. #3 - Dale Earnhardt
2. #8 - Sterling Marlin*
3. #25 - Ken Schrader*
4. #5 - Ricky Rudd
5. #24 - Jeff Gordon
6. #6 - Mark Martin
7. #4 - Ernie Irvan
8. #18 - Dale Jarrett
9. #14 - Terry Labonte
10. #55 - Ted Musgrave

Failed to qualify: #45 - Rich Bickle, #62 - Clay Young, #29 - Kerry Teague, #0 - Delma Cowart, #31 - Stan Fox, #49 - Stanley Smith, #35 - Bill Venturini, #65 - Jerry O'Neil, #48 - James Hylton, #73 - Phil Barkdoll, #79 - Andy Belmont, #77 - Mike Potter, #86 - Mark Thompson, #82 - Mark Stahl, #83 - Lake Speed, #85 - Ken Bouchard, #89 - Jim Sauter, #95 - Jeremy Mayfield, #23 - Eddie Bierschwale, #99 - Brad Teague

- This was Sterling Marlin's 9th 2nd-place finish.
- Ken Schrader originally won the pole, but failed post-qualifying inspection due to an illegal carburetor designed to bypass the restrictor plate. Schrader was forced to start in last place.

=== Slick 50 300 ===
The inaugural Slick 50 300 was held on July 11 at New Hampshire International Speedway. Mark Martin won the pole.

Top ten results

1. #2 - Rusty Wallace
2. #6 - Mark Martin
3. #28 - Davey Allison*
4. #18 - Dale Jarrett
5. #5 - Ricky Rudd
6. #8 - Sterling Marlin
7. #24 - Jeff Gordon
8. #42 - Kyle Petty, 1 lap down
9. #11 - Bill Elliott, 1 lap down
10. #22 - Bobby Labonte, 1 lap down

Failed to qualify: #62 - Clay Young

- This would be Davey Allison's last NASCAR start before his death.
- Jeff Burton and Joe Nemechek made their Winston Cup debuts in this race. Burton started 6th, but crashed out and finished 37th. Nemechek started 15th, but finished 36th with a broken rocker arm.

=== Miller Genuine Draft 500 ===
The Miller Genuine Draft 500 was held July 18 at Pocono Raceway. Ken Schrader won the pole. This was the first Cup race held after the death of Davey Allison, who died two days after the previous race in a helicopter crash at Talladega.

Top ten results

1. #3 - Dale Earnhardt*
2. #2 - Rusty Wallace
3. #11 - Bill Elliott*
4. #21 - Morgan Shepherd
5. #26 - Brett Bodine
6. #25 - Ken Schrader
7. #8 - Sterling Marlin
8. #18 - Dale Jarrett
9. #33 - Harry Gant
10. #17 - Darrell Waltrip

Failed to qualify: #52 - Jimmy Means, #78 - Jay Hedgecock, #56 - Jerry Hill, #57 - Bob Schacht

Withdrawn: #28 - Davey Allison

- Out of respect for Allison, Robert Yates Racing did not enter the event with a replacement driver.
- Bill Elliott, after having a disastrous 1993 to this point, gets his first top-5 finish of 1993.
- After getting the victory, Dale Earnhardt would do a polish victory lap with a Davey Allison flag.
- In his victory lane interview, Earnhardt said of Davey: "I'd run second to him in a heartbeat if it'd bring him back."

=== DieHard 500 ===
The DieHard 500 was held July 25 at Talladega Superspeedway. Bill Elliott won the pole.

Top ten results

1. #3 - Dale Earnhardt*
2. #4 - Ernie Irvan
3. #6 - Mark Martin
4. #42 - Kyle Petty
5. #18 - Dale Jarrett
6. #68 - Greg Sacks
7. #21 - Morgan Shepherd
8. #33 - Harry Gant
9. #26 - Brett Bodine
10. #16 - Wally Dallenbach Jr.

Failed to qualify: #45 - Rich Bickle, #38 - Bobby Hamilton, #46 - Buddy Baker, #62 - Clay Young, #29 - Kerry Teague

- Earnhardt beat Irvan by a margin of 0.005 seconds, setting a new record.
- The Robert Yates Racing #28 team returned to competition in this race, with Robby Gordon serving as a substitute driver. During the pre-race ceremonies; the invocation by the Rev. Hal Marchman was preceded by the reading of a poem by Davey Allison's widow Liz, while CBS ran a montage of Allison's life and career mixed with footage of Davey Allison's uncle Donnie driving the car around the track as the song "The Fans" by the group Alabama played in the background. Gordon started 14th, but crashed on lap 55 and finished in last place.
- On lap 69, contact from Stanley Smith sent Jimmy Horton's car flying over the wall in-between turns 1 and 2, landing on an access road outside the track. Horton was mostly unhurt, while Smith suffered near-fatal head injuries.
- Neil Bonnett made his first NASCAR start since March 1990 in this race, driving a second car for Richard Childress. On lap 132, Bonnett's car blew over on the front stretch and flipped into the catch fence, resulting a lengthy red flag to repair the fence. Bonnett was uninjured.
- Bonnett's accident, along with the other large accidents on superspeedways in 1993, resulted in the introduction of roof flaps in 1994.

=== Budweiser at The Glen ===
The Budweiser at The Glen was held August 8 at Watkins Glen International. Mark Martin won the pole.

Top ten results

1. #6 - Mark Martin*
2. #16 - Wally Dallenbach Jr.
3. #12 - Jimmy Spencer
4. #11 - Bill Elliott
5. #25 - Ken Schrader
6. #8 - Sterling Marlin
7. #22 - Bobby Labonte
8. #9 - P. J. Jones
9. #40 - Kenny Wallace
10. #33 - Harry Gant

Failed to qualify: #77 - Davy Jones, #71 - Dave Marcis, #81 - Jeff Davis, #29 - Kerry Teague, #65 - Jerry O'Neil

- Mark Martin had the dominant car in the race. However, problems on pit road put him out of the top-20 at one point. Martin raced up through the field and inherited the lead with 5 laps to go when Kyle Petty and Dale Earnhardt crashed in the esses.
- This was Martin's first victory from the pole in his twenty-first attempt.

=== Champion Spark Plug 400 ===
The Champion Spark Plug 400 was held August 15 at Michigan International Speedway. Ken Schrader won the pole.

Top ten results

1. #6 - Mark Martin
2. #21 - Morgan Shepherd
3. #24 - Jeff Gordon
4. #18 - Dale Jarrett
5. #55 - Ted Musgrave
6. #2 - Rusty Wallace
7. #28 - Lake Speed
8. #22 - Bobby Labonte
9. #3 - Dale Earnhardt
10. #11 - Bill Elliott

Failed to qualify: #37 - Loy Allen Jr., #48 - James Hylton, #95 - Jeremy Mayfield, #53 - Richie Petty, #85 - Ken Bouchard, #76 - Ron Hornaday Jr., #62 - Clay Young, #29 - John Krebs, #81 - Jeff Davis, #02 - T. W. Taylor, #48 - Andy Genzman

- This was the last time this race was sponsored by Champion Spark Plugs, a sponsorship that dates back to 1975.

=== Brickyard 400 test session ===
A day after the Champion Spark Plug 400, the top 35 teams in the standings were invited to participate in an open test session for the 1994 Brickyard 400. On the way home from Michigan, the teams stopped at the Indianapolis Motor Speedway for two days of practice. Retired driver Richard Petty took a few fast laps on the second day, then donated the car to the Speedway museum.

=== Bud 500 ===
The Bud 500 was held August 28 at Bristol International Raceway. Mark Martin won the pole.

Top ten results

1. #6 - Mark Martin
2. #2 - Rusty Wallace
3. #3 - Dale Earnhardt
4. #33 - Harry Gant
5. #1 - Rick Mast
6. #7 - Jimmy Hensley
7. #26 - Brett Bodine
8. #15 - Geoff Bodine
9. #40 - Kenny Wallace*, 1 lap down
10. #30 - Michael Waltrip, 2 laps down

Failed to qualify: #55 - Ted Musgrave, #75 - Todd Bodine, #9 - P. J. Jones, #45 - Rich Bickle

- Dick Trickle relieved Kenny Wallace in his car, as Wallace had broken his scapula during testing at Indianapolis Motor Speedway.
- This was Ernie Irvan's final race driving for Morgan-McClure Motorsports before leaving to drive the #28 for Robert Yates Racing to replace the late Davey Allison. Irvin would finish 26th after blowing an engine.

=== Mountain Dew Southern 500 ===
The Mountain Dew Southern 500 was held September 5 at Darlington Raceway. Ken Schrader won the pole.

Top ten results

1. #6 - Mark Martin*
2. #26 - Brett Bodine
3. #2 - Rusty Wallace
4. #3 - Dale Earnhardt
5. #28 - Ernie Irvan*, 1 lap down
6. #5 - Ricky Rudd, 1 lap down
7. #33 - Harry Gant, 1 lap down
8. #21 - Morgan Shepherd, 2 laps down
9. #25 - Ken Schrader, 2 laps down
10. #40 - Kenny Wallace, 3 laps down

Failed to qualify: #48 - Trevor Boys, #56 - Jerry Hill, #29 - Jeff McClure

- The race was shortened from 367 laps to 351 laps (15 laps) due to a lengthy 3-hour rain delay and the track did not have lights. As the race came towards the end, the teams were told on a restart with 25 laps to go that there would only be 10 laps remaining due to darkness. The race ended at approximately 7:30 PM ET.
- Ernie Irvan negotiated out of his contract with Morgan-McClure Motorsports in order to take over the #28 for Robert Yates Racing, finishing 5th in his first outing for the team.
- The #4 car would have 3 different driver to finish the season. For this race all the way through North Wilkesboro the driver would be Jeff Purvis. Purvis would finish 26th, 8 laps down to the winner.
- This was Mark Martin's 4th consecutive victory, tying the Modern-era record for most consecutive victories.

=== Miller Genuine Draft 400 ===
The Miller Genuine Draft 400 was held September 11 at Richmond International Raceway. Bobby Labonte won his first career pole.

Top ten results

1. #2 - Rusty Wallace
2. #11 - Bill Elliott
3. #3 - Dale Earnhardt
4. #5 - Ricky Rudd
5. #26 - Brett Bodine
6. #6 - Mark Martin
7. #17 - Darrell Waltrip
8. #14 - Terry Labonte
9. #42 - Kyle Petty
10. #24 - Jeff Gordon

Failed to qualify: #80 - Jimmy Horton, #45 - Rich Bickle, #53 - Ritchie Petty, #02 - T. W. Taylor

=== SplitFire Spark Plug 500 ===
The SplitFire Spark Plug 500 was held September 19 at Dover Downs International Speedway. Rusty Wallace won the pole.

Top ten results

1. #2 - Rusty Wallace
2. #25 - Ken Schrader
3. #17 - Darrell Waltrip
4. #18 - Dale Jarrett
5. #33 - Harry Gant
6. #12 - Jimmy Spencer
7. #22 - Bobby Labonte
8. #14 - Terry Labonte
9. #21 - Morgan Shepherd, 1 lap down
10. #11 - Bill Elliott, 2 laps down

Failed to qualify: #48 - Trevor Boys, #84 - Norm Benning, #66 - Mike Wallace, #02 - T. W. Taylor, #9 - P. J. Jones, #77 - Mike Potter

- Geoff Bodine made his first start as an owner-driver in this race, driving the #7 Ford formerly owned and driven by the late Alan Kulwicki. Bodine started 4th, but crashed out and finished 30th. Lake Speed would be hired to replace Bodine in the Bud Moore Engineering #15 Ford.
- Dick Trickle started the #26 Quaker State Ford after Brett Bodine suffered an injury in practice. Trickle would finish 25th, 93 laps down to the winner.
- This race was mired with tire issues resulting in several failures and 16 cautions for 103 laps. The race took 4 hours and 59 minutes to complete, with an average speed of 100.334 mph.
- Jeff Purvis would have his best finish of 1993 & with the #4 team of 13th, 3 laps down to the winner.

=== Goody's 500 ===
The Goody's 500 was held September 26 at Martinsville Speedway. Ernie Irvan won the pole.

Top ten results

1. #28 - Ernie Irvan*
2. #2 - Rusty Wallace
3. #12 - Jimmy Spencer
4. #5 - Ricky Rudd
5. #18 - Dale Jarrett, 1 lap down
6. #26 - Brett Bodine, 1 lap down
7. #14 - Terry Labonte, 1 lap down
8. #30 - Michael Waltrip, 1 lap down
9. #21 - Morgan Shepherd, 2 laps down
10. #42 - Kyle Petty, 2 laps down

Failed to qualify: #52 - Jimmy Means

- This was Robert Yates Racing's first victory since Davey Allison's death.
- Championship leader Dale Earnhardt suffered rear end issues and finished 29th, his second consecutive finish outside the top-25. These back-to-back poor finishes reduced his points lead from 284 points to just 82 points.
- This was the last race with an entry list of less than 40 cars until Atlanta in February 2016.

=== Tyson/Holly Farms 400 ===
The Tyson/Holly Farms 400 was held October 3 at North Wilkesboro Speedway. Ernie Irvan won the pole.

Top ten results

1. #2 - Rusty Wallace*
2. #3 - Dale Earnhardt
3. #28 - Ernie Irvan
4. #42 - Kyle Petty
5. #5 - Ricky Rudd, 1 lap down
6. #33 - Harry Gant, 2 laps down
7. #14 - Terry Labonte*, 2 laps down
8. #1 - Rick Mast, 3 laps down
9. #18 - Dale Jarrett, 3 laps down
10. #25 - Ken Schrader, 3 laps down

Failed to qualify: #52 - Jimmy Means, #48 - James Hylton, #68 - Greg Sacks, #71 - Dave Marcis, #45 - Rich Bickle, #37 - Loy Allen Jr.

- This was Rusty Wallace's fifth short track victory of 1993. As of today, Wallace is the most recent driver in NASCAR to score top-2 finishes on all short track races in a single season. In all 8 short track races of 1993, Rusty scored 5 wins, and finished 2nd 3 times, scoring an average short track finish of 1.375.
- Terry Labonte's 7th-place finish was the last top-10 for team owner Billy Hagen.
- In what would be Jeff Purvis's last time in the #4 car, he would finish 25th, 20 laps down to the winner.

=== Mello Yello 500 ===
The Mello Yello 500 was held October 10 at Charlotte Motor Speedway. Jeff Gordon won his first career pole.

Top ten results

1. #28 - Ernie Irvan*
2. #6 - Mark Martin
3. #3 - Dale Earnhardt
4. #2 - Rusty Wallace
5. #24 - Jeff Gordon
6. #12 - Jimmy Spencer
7. #42 - Kyle Petty
8. #5 - Ricky Rudd, 1 lap down
9. #25 - Ken Schrader, 2 laps down
10. #11 - Bill Elliott, 2 laps down

Failed to qualify: #71 - Dave Marcis, #47 - Billy Standridge, #37 - Loy Allen Jr., #35 - Bill Venturini, #63 - Norm Benning, #99 - Brad Teague, #83 - Jeff McClure, #02 - T. W. Taylor

- Ernie Irvan's victory was one of the most dominant in recent Cup Series history, leading all but 6 of 334 laps (98.2%).
- This would be the first race in NASCAR history that 2 sets of 3 brothers all competed against each other: The Wallace's (Rusty, Mike, & Kenny), and The Bodine's (Geoff, Brett, & Todd).
- Joe Nemechek would take over the #4 car for this race and the next. Joe started 11th but finished 25th, 8 laps down to the winner.
- This was the final race Neil Bonnett called on TBS before his death at Daytona in February 1994.

=== AC Delco 500 ===
The AC Delco 500 was held October 24 at North Carolina Speedway. Mark Martin won the pole.

Top ten results

1. #2 - Rusty Wallace
2. #3 - Dale Earnhardt
3. #11 - Bill Elliott
4. #33 - Harry Gant
5. #6 - Mark Martin, 1 lap down
6. #28 - Ernie Irvan, 1 lap down
7. #17 - Darrell Waltrip, 1 lap down
8. #25 - Ken Schrader, 1 lap down
9. #41 - Dick Trickle, 2 laps down
10. #7 - Geoff Bodine, 2 laps down

Failed to qualify: #47 - Billy Standridge, #63 - Norm Benning, #65 - Jerry O'Neil, #05 - Ed Ferree

- By winning this race, Rusty Wallace became the only driver in NASCAR history to pull off season sweeps at both North Wilkesboro & Rockingham in the same season.
- Jimmy Means made his final career start in this race. He would finish 25 laps down in 26th.
- Joe Nemechek made his last start in the #4 car. He finished 23rd, 7 laps down to the winner.

=== Slick 50 500 ===
The Slick 50 500 was held October 31 at Phoenix International Raceway. Bill Elliott won the pole.

Top ten results

1. #6 - Mark Martin
2. #28 - Ernie Irvan
3. #42 - Kyle Petty
4. #3 - Dale Earnhardt
5. #11 - Bill Elliott
6. #5 - Ricky Rudd
7. #17 - Darrell Waltrip
8. #22 - Bobby Labonte
9. #30 - Michael Waltrip
10. #1 - Rick Mast

Failed to qualify: #52 - Scott Gaylord, #36 - Butch Gilliland, #13 - Stan Fox, #48 - Jack Sellers, #81 - Jeff Davis, #51 - Rick Scribner

- Rusty Wallace suffered mechanical problems late in the race and finished 19th, allowing Dale Earnhardt to extended his points lead to 126 points ahead of Wallace going into Atlanta.
- Jimmy Hensley who filled in for the #7 car would drive the #4 car for this and the season finale. Jimmy would crash on lap 73 but return to the track. The handling would deteriorate to the point where Jimmy parked the car after completing 242 laps of 312, ultimately finishing 32nd.
- This was the final Cup series race Neil Bonnett called on TNN before his death at Daytona in February 1994.

=== Hooters 500 ===
The Hooters 500 was held November 14 at Atlanta Motor Speedway. Harry Gant won the pole.

Top ten results

1. #2 - Rusty Wallace
2. #5 - Ricky Rudd
3. #7 - Darrell Waltrip
4. #11 - Bill Elliott
5. #41 - Dick Trickle
6. #30 - Michael Waltrip
7. #18 - Dale Jarrett
8. #55 - Ted Musgrave
9. #75 - Phil Parsons*
10. #3 - Dale Earnhardt*, 1 lap down

Failed to qualify: #47 - Billy Standridge, #95 - Jeremy Mayfield, #52 - Jimmy Means, #62 - Clay Young, #57 - Bob Schacht, #72 - John Andretti, #63 - Norm Benning, #9 - P. J. Jones, #84 - Rick Crawford, #48 - Andy Genzman

- Dale Earnhardt's 10th-place finish was enough for him to win his sixth Winston Cup championship, needing only to finish 34th or better to win the title. By lap 117, enough cars had dropped out of the race for Earnhardt to mathematically clinch the championship.
- Despite leading the most laps and winning his 10th race of 1993. Rusty Wallace was unable to overtake Earnhardt for the championship, finishing 80 points behind. This race was also Wallace's 300th Cup Series start.
- Wallace became the first driver since Dale Earnhardt in 1987 to win ten or more Cup Series races in a single season.
- This was Wallace's 31st and final victory driving for Pontiac, as he and Penske South Racing would switch to Ford in 1994. Wallace holds the NASCAR record for most wins by a Pontiac driver, with 31.
- Neil Bonnett qualified for the race in a backup car for Richard Childress Racing, and executed one of the first start and park situations in NASCAR. The team arranged that Bonnett would climb out of the #31 car in the event that Earnhardt's car had problems before the race starts. If Earnhardt quickly hopped in and took the green flag in the #31 car, by rule, he would be awarded full points for that entry. The car Bonnett qualified was even prepared with Earnhardt's exact chassis set-ups. Earnhardt started his primary car without incident, and Bonnett pulled off the track to finish last after 3 laps. The team gave the reason of "engine failure". Bonnett's intentional "start and park" also helped maximize Earnhardt's finishing position, as only seven additional cars had to drop out for Earnhardt to mathematically clinch the title.
- In addition to Bonnett's entry, RCR arrived with a truck filled with extra spare parts, including an entire pre-assembled rear end and a framing machine to fix the car in case of a crash.
- This was also Bonnett's final ever NASCAR race he competed in before his death at Daytona in February 1994.
- Due to fog at the airport, several teams had members arrive late at the track. Darrell Waltrip started the race without his entire pit crew.
- Todd Bodine had Phil Parsons as a relief driver for this race, as Bodine was injured in a crash in the Busch Grand National race the previous day.
- Jimmy Hensley in his last race for the #4 car would finish 25th, 20 laps down to the winner. 1994 would see the #4 car being driven by 1 driver the whole season in Sterling Marlin.
- Following the finish, Earnhardt and race winner Wallace drove a side-by-side Polish victory lap carrying Alan Kulwicki and Davey Allison flags.

== Final points standings ==
(key) Bold - Pole position awarded by time. Italics - Pole position set by owner's points standings. *- Most laps led.

| Pos | Driver | DAY | CAR | RCH | ATL | DAR | BRI | NWS | MAR | TAL | SON | CLT | DOV | POC | MCH | DAY | NHA | POC | TAL | GLN | MCH | BRI | DAR | RCH | DOV | MAR | NWS | CLT | CAR | PHO | ATL | Points |
|---|---|---|---|---|---|---|---|---|---|---|---|---|---|---|---|---|---|---|---|---|---|---|---|---|---|---|---|---|---|---|---|---|
| 1 | Dale Earnhardt | 2* | 2 | 10 | 11 | 1* | 2 | 16 | 22 | **4*** | **6*** | 1* | 1* | 11 | 14 | 1* | 26 | 1* | 1* | 18 | 9 | 3 | 4 | 3 | 27 | 29 | 2 | 3 | 2 | 4 | 10 | 4526 |
| 2 | Rusty Wallace | 32 | 1* | 2 | **3** | 5 | **1*** | 1 | 1* | 6 | 38 | 29 | 21 | 39 | 5 | 18 | 1 | 2 | 17 | 19 | 6 | 2* | 3 | 1* | **1*** | 2 | 1* | 4 | 1* | 19 | 1* | 4446 |
| 3 | Mark Martin | 6 | 5 | 7 | 32* | 2 | 8 | 31 | 10 | 12 | 40 | 28 | 4 | 31 | 6* | 6 | **2** | 13 | 3 | **1*** | 1 | **1** | 1* | 6 | 31 | 16 | 16 | 2 | **5** | 1* | 20 | 4150 |
| 4 | Dale Jarrett | 1 | 6 | 4 | 31 | 3 | 32 | 32 | 3 | 3 | 13 | 3 | 2 | 19 | 4 | 8 | 4 | 8 | 5 | 32 | 4 | 31 | 12 | 14 | 4 | 5 | 9 | 26 | 30 | 16 | 7 | 4000 |
| 5 | Kyle Petty | **31** | 32 | 5* | 7 | 7 | 3 | 2 | 5 | 18 | 5 | 14 | 29 | 1* | 12 | 33 | 8 | 27 | 4 | 26 | 18 | 30 | 16 | 9 | 14 | 10 | 4 | 7 | 13 | 3 | 11 | 3860 |
| 6 | Ernie Irvan | 37 | 3 | 11 | 2 | 22 | 23 | 11 | 32 | 1 | 2 | 5 | **32** | 34 | 3 | **7** | 15 | 31 | 2 | 15 | 32 | 26 | 5 | 36 | 26 | **1*** | **3** | 1* | 6 | 2 | 12 | 3834 |
| 7 | Morgan Shepherd | 7 | 35 | 14 | 1 | 10 | 7 | 8 | 19 | 15 | 14 | 9 | 9 | 7 | 7 | 14 | 14 | 4 | 7 | 28 | 2 | 13 | 8 | 30 | 9 | 9 | 32 | 14 | 11 | 11 | 32 | 3807 |
| 8 | Bill Elliott | 39 | 11 | 33 | 9 | 14 | 30 | 10 | 27 | 22 | 17 | 6 | 17 | 10 | 9 | 20 | 9 | 3 | 11 | 4 | 10 | 11 | 18 | 2 | 10 | 12 | 18 | 10 | 3 | **5** | 4 | 3774 |
| 9 | Ken Schrader | 8 | 24 | **20** | 29 | 4 | 34 | 3 | 18 | 21 | 4 | **4** | 5 | **2** | 16 | 3 | 38 | **6** | 32 | 5 | **27** | 24 | **9** | 12 | 2 | 13 | 10 | 9 | 8 | 33 | 27 | 3715 |
| 10 | Ricky Rudd | 30 | 12 | 15 | 5 | 19 | 26 | 7 | 29 | 41 | 3 | 37 | 35 | 9 | 1 | 4 | 5 | 11 | 24 | 24 | 35* | 22 | 6 | 4 | 21 | 4 | 5 | 8 | 14 | 6 | 2 | 3644 |
| 11 | Harry Gant | 21 | 31 | 9 | 21 | 37 | 28 | 13 | 31 | 23 | 19 | 18 | 7 | 3 | 10 | 21 | 17 | 9 | 8 | 10 | 30 | 4 | 7 | 11 | 5 | 33 | 6 | 12 | 4 | 12 | **28** | 3524 |
| 12 | Jimmy Spencer | 13 | 16 | 13 | 10 | 29 | 4 | 14 | 30 | 2 | 27 | 7 | 8 | 4 | 18 | 39 | 18 | 24 | 30 | 3 | 20 | 25 | 15 | 35 | 6 | 3 | 13 | 6 | 20 | 27 | 16 | 3496 |
| 13 | Darrell Waltrip | 18 | 30 | 8 | 35 | 16 | 6 | 5 | 4 | 26 | 35 | 11 | 24 | 30 | 19 | 13 | 19 | 10 | 37 | 14 | 13 | 29 | 28 | 7 | 3 | 18 | 11 | 19 | 7 | 7 | 3 | 3479 |
| 14 | Jeff Gordon **(R)** | 5 | 34 | 6 | 4 | 24 | 17 | 34 | 8 | 11 | 11 | 2 | 18 | 28 | 2 | 5 | 7 | 37 | 31 | 31 | 3 | 20 | 22 | 10 | 24 | 11 | 34 | **5** | 21 | 35 | 31 | 3447 |
| 15 | Sterling Marlin | 9 | 28 | 31 | 12 | 21 | 20 | 9* | 21 | 24 | 12 | 24 | 33 | 8 | 8 | 2 | 6* | 7 | 27 | 6 | 17 | 23 | 31 | 24 | 11 | 30 | 19 | 17 | 12 | 30 | 17 | 3355 |
| 16 | Geoff Bodine | 3 | 9 | 12 | 6 | 8 | 18 | 28 | **6** | 27 | 1 | 10 | 23 | 24 | 17 | 37 | 12 | 12 | 16 | 16 | 24 | 8 | 20 | 34 | 30 | 14 | 31 | 13 | 10 | 43 | 39 | 3338 |
| 17 | Michael Waltrip | 16 | 26 | 23 | 14 | 33 | 14 | 20 | 16 | 10 | 23 | 13 | 27 | 21 | 37 | 22 | 23 | 14 | 20 | 12 | 16 | 10 | 13 | 19 | 23 | 8 | 14 | 27 | 18 | 9 | 6 | 3291 |
| 18 | Terry Labonte | 11 | 10 | 24 | 33 | 9 | 21 | 6 | 9 | 37 | 9 | 33 | 20 | 32 | 20 | 9 | 31 | 16 | 14 | 23 | 29 | 34 | 33 | 8 | 8 | 7 | 7 | 16 | 15 | 14 | 13 | 3280 |
| 19 | Bobby Labonte **(R)** | 20 | 33 | 29 | 18 | 18 | 24 | 25 | 12 | 35 | 16 | 8 | 19 | 20 | 36 | 41 | 10 | 15 | 15 | 7 | 8 | 15 | 14 | **13** | 7 | 32 | 12 | 28 | 22 | 8 | 14 | 3221 |
| 20 | Brett Bodine | 17 | 22 | 32 | 8 | 12 | 9 | **17** | 7 | 30 | 24 | 41 | 16 | 29 | **39** | 19 | 13 | 5 | 9 | 20 | 14 | 7 | 2 | 5 | QL | 6 | 21 | 15 | 35 | 28 | 40 | 3183 |
| 21 | Rick Mast | 12 | 39 | 35 | 30 | 15 | 10 | 19 | 11 | 13 | 29 | 31 | 6 | 16 | 11 | 16 | 16 | 36 | 38 | 37 | 33 | 5 | 32 | 18 | 18 | 26 | 8 | 18 | 17 | 10 | 37 | 3001 |
| 22 | Wally Dallenbach Jr. | 10 | 20 | 27 | 25 | 13 | 11 | 21 | 34 | 29 | 7 | 40 | 12 | 25 | 25 | 35 | 27 | 17 | 10 | 2 | 31 | 21 | 11 | 15 | 15 | 27 | 15 | 24 | 31 | 34 | 33 | 2978 |
| 23 | Kenny Wallace **(R)** | 23 | 23 | 26 | 16 | 32 | 13 | 15 | 24 | 14 | 36 | 23 | 13 | 15 | 29 | 28 | 21 | 23 | 35 | 9 | 23 | 9 | 10 | 32 | 16 | 15 | 27 | 35 | 37 | 17 | 30 | 2893 |
| 24 | Hut Stricklin | 4 | 13 | 18 | 20 | 28 | 27 | 22 | 26 | 20 | 10 | 20 | 15 | 13 | 21 | 40 | 25 | 28 | 12 | 17 | 34 | 32 | 36 | 17 | 29 | 23 | 28 | 23 | 24 | 36 | 22 | 2866 |
| 25 | Ted Musgrave | 15 | 7 | 17 | 19 | 30 | 15 | 24 | 28 | 28 | 39 | 26 | 14 | 5 | 15 | 10 | 24 | 33 | 33 | 34 | 5 | DNQ | 34 | 22 | 28 | 31 | 29 | 21 | 28 | 15 | 8 | 2853 |
| 26 | Derrike Cope | 29 | 18 | 19 | 17 | 17 | 12 | 30 | 25 | 8 | 18 | 36 | 31 | 33 | 27 | 24 | 22 | 29 | 36 | 11 | 21 | 27 | 17 | 28 | 32 | 20 | 20 | 39 | 19 | 23 | 19 | 2787 |
| 27 | Bobby Hillin Jr. | 35 | 19 | 28 | 15 | 35 | 33 | 26 | 23 | 17 | 41 | 16 | 25 | 38 | 33 | 12 | 20 | 20 | 13 | 35 | 11 | 12 | 24 | 27 | 12 | 22 | 22 | 20 | 33 | 18 | 41 | 2717 |
| 28 | Rick Wilson | 34 | 17 | 25 | 24 | 26 | 25 | 23 | 17 | 16 | 8 | 32 | 11 | 12 | 34 | 11 | 28 | 21 | 23 | 22 | 28 | 28 | 30 | 29 | 34 | | 33 | 36 | 26 | 20 | 23 | 2647 |
| 29 | Phil Parsons | 22 | 8 | 16 | 39 | 36 | 31 | 18 | 20 | 19 | 37 | 12 | 37 | 14 | 13 | 25 | 39 | 18 | 22 | 33 | 19 | 14 | 21 | 20 | 37 | 19 | | | | | 9 | 2454 |
| 30 | Dick Trickle | 41 | 29 | 21 | 37 | 20 | 22 | 33 | 14 | 31 | 20 | 19 | 28 | 36 | 31 | 26 | 33 | 30 | 19 | | 39 | | | 25 | 25 | | 30 | 22 | 9 | 31 | 5 | 2224 |
| 31 | Davey Allison | 28 | 14 | 1 | 13 | 11 | 5 | 4 | 2 | 7 | 15 | 30 | 3 | 6 | 35 | 31 | 3 | | | | | | | | | | | | | | | 2104 |
| 32 | Jimmy Hensley | 40 | 25 | 34 | | | | 12 | 13 | 9 | | 15 | 22 | 17 | 23 | 34 | 11 | 39 | 28 | | 15 | 6 | 23 | 21 | | 34 | | | | 32 | 25 | 2001 |
| 33 | Dave Marcis | 33 | 21 | 36 | 34 | 25 | DNQ | DNQ | 15 | DNQ | 28 | 39 | 36 | 23 | 24 | 27 | 30 | 22 | 29 | DNQ | 22 | 17 | 29 | 23 | 19 | 21 | DNQ | DNQ | 27 | | 18 | 1970 |
| 34 | Lake Speed | 14 | | 30 | 28 | | 29 | | | 34 | | 27 | 30 | 27 | 30 | DNQ | 35 | | 18 | 27 | 7 | 16 | | | 33 | 24 | 17 | 11 | 16 | 13 | 26 | 1956 |
| 35 | Greg Sacks | | | | 23 | | | | | 33 | | 17 | 38 | 18 | 22 | 15 | 32 | 32 | 6 | | 12 | 19 | 25 | 31 | 20 | 28 | DNQ | 32 | 32 | | 24 | 1730 |
| 36 | Jimmy Means | Wth | | | 22 | 31 | 16 | 27 | DNQ | 32 | | 38 | 26 | 22 | 28 | 36 | 34 | DNQ | 25 | | 25 | 18 | 39 | 26 | 17 | DNQ | DNQ | | 29 | | DNQ | 1471 |
| 37 | Bobby Hamilton | 27 | 15 | 22 | 26 | 23 | 35 | 29 | 33 | | | DNQ | 10 | | | 17 | | 19 | DNQ | | | 31 | 19 | | | | | 37 | | | 21 | 1348 |
| 38 | Jimmy Horton | 25 | | DNQ | 27 | | | DNQ | | 36 | | 25 | DNQ | 37 | 41 | 38 | | 26 | 39 | | 38 | | | DNQ | 22 | | | | 34 | | 38 | 841 |
| 39 | Jeff Purvis | DNQ | | | | | | | | 39 | | | | | | 23 | | | 21 | | | | 26 | 16 | 13 | 17 | 25 | | | | | 774 |
| 40 | Todd Bodine | | | | | | | | | | | | | | | | | | | 30 | 40 | DNQ | 27 | 33 | 35 | 25 | 23 | 42 | 25 | 25 | QL | 715 |
| 41 | Alan Kulwicki | 26 | 4 | 3 | 36 | 6 | Wth | | | | | | | | | | | | | | | | | | | | | | | | | 625 |
| 42 | P. J. Jones **(R)** | | | | | | | | DNQ | DNQ | 25 | | 38 | | 34 | 30 | | | | 8 | 26 | DNQ | | | DNQ | | | | | | DNQ | 498 |
| 43 | Joe Ruttman | 38 | | | 38 | | 19 | | | 5 | | 35 | | | | | | | | | | | | | | | | | | | | 417 |
| 44 | Joe Nemechek | | | | | | | | | | | | | | | | 36 | | | 21 | 37 | | | | | | | 25 | 23 | | | 389 |
| 45 | Loy Allen Jr. | | | | | | | | | | | | | | | 29 | | | 26 | | DNQ | | | | | | DNQ | DNQ | 41 | 26 | 29 | 362 |
| 46 | Mike Wallace | | | | | | | | | | | 22 | | | | | | | | | | | | | DNQ | | | 30 | 36 | | 15 | 343 |
| 47 | Jim Sauter | 19 | | | | | | | | | | | | | 26 | DNQ | | | | | 36 | | | | | | | 38 | | | | 295 |
| 48 | Rich Bickle | DNQ | | DNQ | DNQ | | | | | 39 | | 21 | | | | DNQ | | | DNQ | | 41 | DNQ | | DNQ | | | DNQ | 40 | | | 36 | 292 |
| 49 | Rick Carelli | | | DNQ | DNQ | | | | | | 21 | | | | | | | | | | | | | | | | | | | 21 | 35 | 258 |
| 50 | John Andretti | | | | | | | | | | | | | | | | | | | | | | | | | | 24 | 31 | 39 | 40 | DNQ | 250 |
| 51 | Chad Little | 24 | | | | | | | | | | 34 | | | | | | | | | | | | | | | | 33 | | | | 216 |
| 52 | Ken Bouchard | | | | | | | | | 40 | | DNQ | DNQ | | | DNQ | 29 | 25 | | | DNQ | | | | | | | | | | | 207 |
| 53 | Ritchie Petty | | | | | | | | | 25 | | | | | | 32 | | | 41 | | DNQ | | | DNQ | | | | | | | | 195 |
| 54 | Tommy Kendall | | | | | | | | | | 22 | | | | | | | | | 25 | | | | | | | | | | | | 185 |
| 55 | Bob Schacht | | | | 40 | 27 | | | | | | | | | | | | DNQ | | | | | 40 | | 36 | | | | | | DNQ | 180 |
| 56 | T. W. Taylor | | | | | | | | | | | | | | | | | 40 | | | DNQ | | | DNQ | DNQ | | | DNQ | 40 | | 34 | 152 |
| 57 | Kerry Teague | DNQ | | | | | | | | | | | | 26 | | DNQ | | 34 | DNQ | DNQ | | | | | | | | | | | | 146 |
| 58 | Ed Ferree | | 27 | | | | | | | | | | | | | | | | | 36 | | | | | | | | | DNQ | | | 137 |
| 59 | Scott Lagasse | | | | | | | | | | | | | | | | | | | 13 | | | | | | | | | | | | 124 |
| 60 | H. B. Bailey | | | | | | | | | | | | | | 32 | | | | | | | | 37 | | | | | | | | | 119 |
| 61 | John Krebs | | | | | | | | | | 34 | | | | | | | 35 | | | DNQ | | | | | | | | | | | 119 |
| 62 | Dorsey Schroeder | DNQ | | | | | | | | | 33 | | | | | | | | | 38 | | | | | | | | | | | | 113 |
| 63 | Dirk Stephens | | | | | | | | | | 30 | | | | | | | | | | | | | | | | | | | 42 | | 110 |
| 64 | James Hylton | DNQ | 40 | | DNQ | 34 | DNQ | DNQ | | DNQ | | DNQ | | | | DNQ | | | | | DNQ | | | | | | DNQ | | | | | 104 |
| 65 | Jerry O'Neil | | | | | | | | | DNQ | | DNQ | | | | DNQ | 40 | | | DNQ | | | | | | | | 34 | DNQ | | | 104 |
| 66 | Mike Potter | DNQ | 37 | | | 38 | | | | | | | | | | DNQ | | | | | | | | | DNQ | | | | | | | 101 |
| 67 | Neil Bonnett | | | | | | | | | | | | | | | | | | 34 | | | | | | | | | | | | 42 | 98 |
| 68 | Jerry Hill | | 38 | | | | | | | | | | DNQ | | | | | DNQ | | | | | DNQ | | | | | | 38 | | | 98 |
| 69 | Ron Hornaday Jr. | | | | | | | | | | | | | | | | | | | | DNQ | | | | | | | | | 22 | | 97 |
| 70 | Clay Young | | | | | | | | | | | | | | 40 | DNQ | DNQ | 38 | DNQ | | DNQ | | | | | | | | | | DNQ | 92 |
| 71 | Chuck Bown | | | | | | | | | | | | | | | | | | | | | | | | | | | | | 24 | | 91 |
| 72 | Jay Hedgecock | | | | | | | DNQ | | | | | | | | | | DNQ | | | | | | | | | 26 | | | | | 85 |
| 73 | Bill Sedgwick | | | | | | | | | | 26 | | | | | | | | | | | | | | | | | | | | | 85 |
| 74 | Scott Gaylord | | | | | | | | | | DNQ | | | | | | | | | 29 | | | | | | | | | | DNQ | | 76 |
| 75 | Steve Grissom | | | | | | | | | | | | | | | | | | | | | | | | | | | | | 29 | | 76 |
| 76 | Jeremy Mayfield | | | | | | | | | | | | | | | DNQ | | | | | DNQ | | | | | | | 29 | | | DNQ | 76 |
| 77 | Bill Schmitt | | | | | | | | | | 31 | | | | | | | | | | | | | | | | | | | | | 70 |
| 78 | Butch Gilliland | | | | | | | | | | 32 | | | | | | | | | | | | | | | | | | | DNQ | | 67 |
| 79 | Trevor Boys | | | | | | | | | | | | | 35 | DNQ | | | | | | | | DNQ | | DNQ | | | | | | | 63 |
| 80 | Mike Skinner | | | | | | | | | | | | | | | | | | | | | | 35 | | | | | | | | | 58 |
| 81 | Johnny Chapman | | 36 | | | | | | | | | DNQ | | | | | | | | | | | | | | | | | | | | 55 |
| 82 | Al Unser Jr. | 36 | | | | | | | | | | | | | | | | | | | | | | | | | | | | | | 55 |
| 83 | Terry Fisher | | | | | | | | | | | | | | | | | | | | | | | | | | | | | 37 | | 52 |
| 84 | Jeff Burton | | | | | | | | | | | | | | | | 37 | | | | | | | | | | | | | | | 52 |
| 85 | Brad Teague | DNQ | | | | | | | | | | | | | | DNQ | | | | | | | 38 | | | | | DNQ | | | | 49 |
| 86 | Rich Woodland Jr. | | | | | | | | | | | | | | | | | | | | | | | | | | | | | 38 | | 49 |
| 87 | Norm Benning | | | | | 39 | | | | | | | | | | | | | | | | | | | DNQ | | | DNQ | DNQ | | DNQ | 46 |
| 88 | Mike Chase | | | | | | | | | | | | | | | | | | | | | | | | | | | | | 39 | | 46 |
| 89 | Stanley Smith | DNQ | DNQ | | | | | DNQ | | DNQ | | DNQ | | | | DNQ | | | 40 | | | | | | | | | | | | | 43 |
| 90 | Graham Taylor | | | | | | | | | | | | | 40 | | | | | | | | | | | | | | | | | | 43 |
| 91 | Andy Hillenburg | | | | | | | | | | | | | | | | | | | | | | | | | | | 41 | | | | 40 |
| 92 | Wayne Jacks | | | | | | | | | | DNQ | | | | | | | | | | | | | | | | | | | 41 | | 40 |
| 93 | Jeff Davis | | | | | | | | | | 42 | | | | DNQ | | | | | DNQ | DNQ | | | | | | | | | DNQ | | 37 |
| 94 | Robby Gordon | | | | | | | | | | | | | | | | | | 42 | | | | | | | | | | | | | 37 |
| 95 | Hershel McGriff | | | | | | | | | | 43 | | | | | | | | | | | | | | | | | | | | | 34 |
| 96 | A. J. Foyt | DNQ | | | | | | | | | | | | | | | | | | | | | | | | | | | | | | |
| 97 | Ken Ragan | DNQ | | | | | | | | | | | | | | | | | | | | | | | | | | | | | | |
| 98 | Steve Kinser | DNQ | | | | | | | | DNQ | | | | | | | | | | | | | | | | | | | | | | |
| 99 | Delma Cowart | DNQ | | | | | | | | DNQ | | | | | | DNQ | | | | | | | | | | | | | | | | |
| 100 | Eddie Bierschwale | DNQ | | | | | | | | | | | | | | DNQ | | | | | | | | | | | | | | | | |
| 101 | Rick Crawford | | | | DNQ | | | | | | | DNQ | | | | | | | | | | | | | | | | | | | DNQ | |
| 102 | John McFadden | | | | | DNQ | | | | | | | | | | | | | | | | | | | | | | | | | | |
| 103 | Ben Hess | | | | | | | | | DNQ | | | | | | | | | | | | | | | | | | | | | | |
| 104 | Phil Barkdoll | | | | | | | | | DNQ | | | | | | DNQ | | | | | | | | | | | | | | | | |
| 105 | R. K. Smith | | | | | | | | | | DNQ | | | | | | | | | | | | | | | | | | | | | |
| 106 | Tony Hunt | | | | | | | | | | DNQ | | | | | | | | | | | | | | | | | | | | | |
| 107 | Jack Sellers | | | | | | | | | | DNQ | | | | | | | | | | | | | | | | | | | DNQ | | |
| 108 | Rick Scribner | | | | | | | | | | DNQ | | | | | | | | | | | | | | | | | | | DNQ | | |
| 109 | Mark Stahl | | | | | | | | | | | | | | | DNQ | | | | | | | | | | | | | | | | |
| 110 | Mark Thompson | | | | | | | | | | | | | | | DNQ | | | | | | | | | | | | | | | | |
| 111 | Bill Venturini | | | | | | | | | | | | | | | DNQ | | | | | | | | | | | | DNQ | | | | |
| 112 | Stan Fox | | | | | | | | | | | | | | | DNQ | | | | | | | | | | | | | | DNQ | | |
| 113 | Buddy Baker | | | | | | | | | | | | | | | | | | DNQ | | | | | | | | | | | | | |
| 114 | Davy Jones | | | | | | | | | | | | | | | | | | | DNQ | | | | | | | | | | | | |
| 115 | Andy Genzman | | | | | | | | | | | | | | | | | | | | DNQ | | | | | | | | | | DNQ | |
| 116 | Jeff McClure | | | | | | | | | | | | | | | | | | | | | | DNQ | | | | | DNQ | | | | |
| Pos | Driver | DAY | CAR | RCH | ATL | DAR | BRI | NWS | MAR | TAL | SON | CLT | DOV | POC | MCH | DAY | NHA | POC | TAL | GLN | MCH | BRI | DAR | RCH | DOV | MAR | NWS | CLT | CAR | PHO | ATL | Points |

== Rookie of the Year ==
After his contract was bought from Bill Davis Racing, Jeff Gordon drove the #24 Hendrick Motorsports Chevy in 1993. He won one pole, had eleven top-tens and finished 14th in points. His next closest competitor was Bobby Labonte who had replaced Gordon at BDR. He had six top-tens and one pole, while third-place finisher Kenny Wallace had only three top-tens. The last place runner was P. J. Jones, who declared late in the season and only ran six races for Melling Racing.

== See also ==
- 1993 NASCAR Busch Series
- 1993 NASCAR Winston West Series
