= 1993 Hanes 500 =

Eighth race of the 1993 NASCAR Winston Cup Series

Race details
- Race 8 of 30 in the 1993 NASCAR Winston Cup Series
- The 1993 Hanes 500 program cover.
- Date: April 25, 1993
- Official name: 44th Annual Hanes 500
- Location: Martinsville, Virginia, Martinsville Speedway
- Course: Permanent racing facility
- Course length: 0.526 miles (0.847 km)
- Distance: 356 laps, 187.256 mi (301.359 km)
- Scheduled distance: 500 laps, 263 mi (423.257 km)
- Average speed: 79.078 miles per hour (127.264 km/h)
- Attendance: 55,000

Pole position
Driver	Geoff Bodine	Bud Moore Engineering
- Time: 20.169

Most laps led
Driver	Rusty Wallace	Penske Racing South
- Laps: 409

Winner
No. 2	Rusty Wallace	Penske Racing South

Television in the United States
- Network: ESPN
- Announcers: Bob Jenkins, Ned Jarrett, Benny Parsons

Radio in the United States
- Radio: Motor Racing Network

The 1993 Hanes 500 was the eighth stock car race of the 1993 NASCAR Winston Cup Series season and the 44th iteration of the event. The race was held on Sunday, April 25, 1993, before an audience of 55,000 in Martinsville, Virginia at Martinsville Speedway, a 0.526 miles (0.847 km) permanent oval-shaped short track. The race took the scheduled 500 laps to complete. At race's end, Penske Racing South driver Rusty Wallace would manage to dominate the race to take his 25th career NASCAR Winston Cup Series victory, his fourth victory of the season, and his third consecutive victory. To fill out the top three, Robert Yates Racing driver Davey Allison and Joe Gibbs Racing driver Dale Jarrett would finish second and third, respectively.

== Background ==
The layout of Martinsville Speedway, the venue where the race was held.

Martinsville Speedway is a NASCAR-owned stock car racing track located in Henry County, in Ridgeway, Virginia, just to the south of Martinsville. At 0.526 miles (0.847 km) in length, it is the shortest track in the NASCAR Cup Series. The track was also one of the first paved oval tracks in NASCAR, being built in 1947 by H. Clay Earles. It is also the only remaining race track that has been on the NASCAR circuit from its beginning in 1948.

=== Entry list ===
- (R) denotes rookie driver.

#	Driver	Team	Make
1	Rick Mast	Precision Products Racing	Ford
2	Rusty Wallace	Penske Racing South	Pontiac
3	Dale Earnhardt	Richard Childress Racing	Chevrolet
4	Ernie Irvan	Morgan–McClure Motorsports	Chevrolet
5	Ricky Rudd	Hendrick Motorsports	Chevrolet
6	Mark Martin	Roush Racing	Ford
7	Jimmy Hensley	AK Racing	Ford
8	Sterling Marlin	Stavola Brothers Racing	Ford
9	P. J. Jones (R)	Melling Racing	Ford
11	Bill Elliott	Junior Johnson & Associates	Ford
12	Jimmy Spencer	Bobby Allison Motorsports	Ford
14	Terry Labonte	Hagan Racing	Chevrolet
15	Geoff Bodine	Bud Moore Engineering	Ford
16	Wally Dallenbach Jr.	Roush Racing	Ford
17	Darrell Waltrip	Darrell Waltrip Motorsports	Chevrolet
18	Dale Jarrett	Joe Gibbs Racing	Chevrolet
21	Morgan Shepherd	Wood Brothers Racing	Ford
22	Bobby Labonte (R)	Bill Davis Racing	Ford
24	Jeff Gordon (R)	Hendrick Motorsports	Chevrolet
25	Ken Schrader	Hendrick Motorsports	Chevrolet
26	Brett Bodine	King Racing	Ford
27	Hut Stricklin	Junior Johnson & Associates	Ford
28	Davey Allison	Robert Yates Racing	Ford
30	Michael Waltrip	Bahari Racing	Pontiac
33	Harry Gant	Leo Jackson Motorsports	Chevrolet
40	Kenny Wallace (R)	SABCO Racing	Pontiac
41	Phil Parsons	Larry Hedrick Motorsports	Chevrolet
42	Kyle Petty	SABCO Racing	Pontiac
44	Rick Wilson	Petty Enterprises	Pontiac
52	Jimmy Means	Jimmy Means Racing	Ford
55	Ted Musgrave	RaDiUs Motorsports	Ford
68	Bobby Hamilton	TriStar Motorsports	Ford
71	Dave Marcis	Marcis Auto Racing	Chevrolet
75	Dick Trickle	Butch Mock Motorsports	Ford
90	Bobby Hillin Jr.	Donlavey Racing	Ford
98	Derrike Cope	Cale Yarborough Motorsports	Ford

== Qualifying ==
Qualifying was split into two rounds. The first round was held on Friday, April 23, at 3:00 PM EST. Each driver would have one lap to set a time. During the first round, the top 20 drivers in the round would be guaranteed a starting spot in the race. If a driver was not able to guarantee a spot in the first round, they had the option to scrub their time from the first round and try and run a faster lap time in a second round qualifying run, held on Saturday, April 24, at 12:30 PM EST. As with the first round, each driver would have one lap to set a time. For this specific race, positions 21-32 would be decided on time, and depending on who needed it, a select amount of positions were given to cars who had not otherwise qualified but were high enough in owner's points; up to two were given. If needed, a past champion who did not qualify on either time or provisionals could use a champion's provisional, adding one more spot to the field.

Geoff Bodine, driving for Bud Moore Engineering, won the pole, setting a time of 20.169 and an average speed of 93.887 mph (151.096 km/h) in the first round.

Two drivers would fail to qualify.

=== Full qualifying results ===
Pos.	#	Driver	Team	Make	Time	Speed
1	15	Geoff Bodine	Bud Moore Engineering	Ford	20.169	93.887
2	27	Hut Stricklin	Junior Johnson & Associates	Ford	20.246	93.530
3	24	Jeff Gordon (R)	Hendrick Motorsports	Chevrolet	20.257	93.479
4	42	Kyle Petty	SABCO Racing	Pontiac	20.291	93.322
5	2	Rusty Wallace	Penske Racing South	Pontiac	20.301	93.276
6	28	Davey Allison	Robert Yates Racing	Ford	20.321	93.184
7	7	Jimmy Hensley	AK Racing	Ford	20.372	92.951
8	6	Mark Martin	Roush Racing	Ford	20.379	92.919
9	68	Bobby Hamilton	TriStar Motorsports	Ford	20.386	92.887
10	30	Michael Waltrip	Bahari Racing	Pontiac	20.396	92.842
11	18	Dale Jarrett	Joe Gibbs Racing	Chevrolet	20.403	92.810
12	4	Ernie Irvan	Morgan–McClure Motorsports	Chevrolet	20.406	92.796
13	25	Ken Schrader	Hendrick Motorsports	Chevrolet	20.407	92.792
14	5	Ricky Rudd	Hendrick Motorsports	Chevrolet	20.414	92.760
15	40	Kenny Wallace (R)	SABCO Racing	Pontiac	20.419	92.737
16	11	Bill Elliott	Junior Johnson & Associates	Ford	20.467	92.520
17	1	Rick Mast	Precision Products Racing	Ford	20.494	92.398
18	26	Brett Bodine	King Racing	Ford	20.499	92.375
19	14	Terry Labonte	Hagan Racing	Chevrolet	20.522	92.272
20	44	Rick Wilson	Petty Enterprises	Pontiac	20.530	92.236
Failed to lock in Round 1
21	3	Dale Earnhardt	Richard Childress Racing	Chevrolet	20.500	92.371
22	55	Ted Musgrave	RaDiUs Motorsports	Ford	20.539	92.195
23	33	Harry Gant	Leo Jackson Motorsports	Chevrolet	20.545	92.168
24	22	Bobby Labonte (R)	Bill Davis Racing	Ford	20.546	92.164
25	12	Jimmy Spencer	Bobby Allison Motorsports	Ford	20.555	92.124
26	17	Darrell Waltrip	Darrell Waltrip Motorsports	Chevrolet	20.559	92.106
27	98	Derrike Cope	Cale Yarborough Motorsports	Ford	20.579	92.016
28	41	Phil Parsons	Larry Hedrick Motorsports	Chevrolet	20.584	91.994
29	21	Morgan Shepherd	Wood Brothers Racing	Ford	20.628	91.798
30	8	Sterling Marlin	Stavola Brothers Racing	Ford	20.631	91.784
31	90	Bobby Hillin Jr.	Donlavey Racing	Ford	20.681	91.562
32	75	Dick Trickle	Butch Mock Motorsports	Ford	20.735	91.324
Provisionals
33	16	Wally Dallenbach Jr.	Roush Racing	Ford	-*	-*
34	71	Dave Marcis	Marcis Auto Racing	Chevrolet	-*	-*
Failed to qualify
35	52	Jimmy Means	Jimmy Means Racing	Ford	-*	-*
36	9	P. J. Jones (R)	Melling Racing	Ford	-*	-*
Official first round qualifying results
Official starting lineup

== Race results ==
Fin	St	#	Driver	Team	Make	Laps	Led	Status	Pts	Winnings
1	5	2	Rusty Wallace	Penske Racing South	Pontiac	500	409	running	185	$45,175
2	6	28	Davey Allison	Robert Yates Racing	Ford	500	2	running	175	$49,725
3	11	18	Dale Jarrett	Joe Gibbs Racing	Chevrolet	500	0	running	165	$30,350
4	26	17	Darrell Waltrip	Darrell Waltrip Motorsports	Chevrolet	500	0	running	160	$28,800
5	4	42	Kyle Petty	SABCO Racing	Pontiac	499	0	running	155	$21,050
6	1	15	Geoff Bodine	Bud Moore Engineering	Ford	497	0	running	150	$26,150
7	18	26	Brett Bodine	King Racing	Ford	497	0	running	146	$19,425
8	3	24	Jeff Gordon (R)	Hendrick Motorsports	Chevrolet	497	0	running	142	$11,975
9	19	14	Terry Labonte	Hagan Racing	Chevrolet	497	0	running	138	$16,125
10	8	6	Mark Martin	Roush Racing	Ford	496	0	running	134	$18,525
11	17	1	Rick Mast	Precision Products Racing	Ford	496	0	running	130	$13,410
12	24	22	Bobby Labonte (R)	Bill Davis Racing	Ford	495	0	running	127	$7,325
13	7	7	Jimmy Hensley	AK Racing	Ford	495	0	running	124	$16,025
14	32	75	Dick Trickle	Butch Mock Motorsports	Ford	495	0	running	121	$6,525
15	34	71	Dave Marcis	Marcis Auto Racing	Chevrolet	494	0	running	118	$9,725
16	10	30	Michael Waltrip	Bahari Racing	Pontiac	494	0	running	115	$12,225
17	20	44	Rick Wilson	Petty Enterprises	Pontiac	490	0	running	112	$9,025
18	13	25	Ken Schrader	Hendrick Motorsports	Chevrolet	489	0	transmission	109	$11,530
19	29	21	Morgan Shepherd	Wood Brothers Racing	Ford	489	0	crash	106	$11,025
20	28	41	Phil Parsons	Larry Hedrick Motorsports	Chevrolet	484	0	running	103	$7,625
21	30	8	Sterling Marlin	Stavola Brothers Racing	Ford	482	0	running	100	$10,325
22	21	3	Dale Earnhardt	Richard Childress Racing	Chevrolet	453	1	engine	102	$10,625
23	31	90	Bobby Hillin Jr.	Donlavey Racing	Ford	451	0	running	94	$4,925
24	15	40	Kenny Wallace (R)	SABCO Racing	Pontiac	424	0	rear end	91	$4,875
25	27	98	Derrike Cope	Cale Yarborough Motorsports	Ford	408	0	running	88	$9,625
26	2	27	Hut Stricklin	Junior Johnson & Associates	Ford	404	88	rear end	90	$12,425
27	16	11	Bill Elliott	Junior Johnson & Associates	Ford	381	0	running	82	$14,825
28	22	55	Ted Musgrave	RaDiUs Motorsports	Ford	350	0	running	79	$9,175
29	14	5	Ricky Rudd	Hendrick Motorsports	Chevrolet	310	0	running	76	$9,025
30	25	12	Jimmy Spencer	Bobby Allison Motorsports	Ford	212	0	engine	73	$8,950
31	23	33	Harry Gant	Leo Jackson Motorsports	Chevrolet	200	0	engine	70	$13,375
32	12	4	Ernie Irvan	Morgan–McClure Motorsports	Chevrolet	140	0	head gasket	67	$13,975
33	9	68	Bobby Hamilton	TriStar Motorsports	Ford	40	0	oil pump	64	$5,925
34	33	16	Wally Dallenbach Jr.	Roush Racing	Ford	18	0	crash	61	$8,900
Official race results

== Standings after the race ==
Drivers' Championship standings

	Pos	Driver	Points
	1	Rusty Wallace	1,297
	2	Dale Earnhardt	1,196 (-101)
	3	Davey Allison	1,139 (-158)
	4	Kyle Petty	1,099 (–198)
1	5	Geoff Bodine	1,090 (–207)
1	6	Mark Martin	1,059 (–238)
2	7	Mark Martin	1,048 (–249)
	8	Dale Jarrett	1,039 (–258)
3	9	Darrell Waltrip	982 (–315)
6	10	Brett Bodine	951 (–346)
Official driver's standings

- Note: Only the first 10 positions are included for the driver standings.

Previous race: 1993 First Union 400	NASCAR Winston Cup Series; 1993 season	Next race: 1993 Winston 500
