= 1993 TranSouth 500 =

Fifth race of the 1993 NASCAR Winston Cup Series

Race details
- Race 5 of 30 in the 1993 NASCAR Winston Cup Series
- The 1993 TranSouth 500 program cover, featuring Bill Elliott.
- Date: March 28, 1993
- Official name: 37th Annual TranSouth 500
- Location: Darlington, South Carolina, Darlington Raceway
- Course: Permanent racing facility
- Course length: 1.366 miles (2.198 km)
- Distance: 367 laps, 501.322 mi (806.799 km)
- Average speed: 139.958 miles per hour (225.241 km/h)

Pole position
Driver	Dale Earnhardt	Richard Childress Racing
- Time: Set by 1993 owner's points

Most laps led
Driver	Dale Earnhardt	Richard Childress Racing
- Laps: 212

Winner
No. 3	Dale Earnhardt	Richard Childress Racing

Television in the United States
- Network: ESPN
- Announcers: Bob Jenkins, Ned Jarrett, Benny Parsons

Radio in the United States
- Radio: Motor Racing Network

The 1993 TranSouth 500 was the fifth stock car race of the 1993 NASCAR Winston Cup Series season and the 37th iteration of the event. The race was held on Sunday, March 28, 1993, in Darlington, South Carolina, at Darlington Raceway, a 1.366 miles (2.198 km) permanent egg-shaped oval racetrack. The race took the scheduled 367 laps to complete. At race's end, Richard Childress Racing driver Dale Earnhardt would manage to overcome a first half struggle and dominate the second half of the race to take his 54th career NASCAR Winston Cup Series victory and his first victory of the season. To fill out the top three, Roush Racing driver Mark Martin and Joe Gibbs Racing driver Dale Jarrett would finish second and third, respectively. This would be the final NASCAR race for Alan Kulwicki, who finished sixth. Kulwicki was killed in a plane crash days later.

== Background ==
The layout of Darlington Raceway, the venue where the race was held.

Darlington Raceway is a race track built for NASCAR racing located near Darlington, South Carolina. It is nicknamed "The Lady in Black" and "The Track Too Tough to Tame" by many NASCAR fans and drivers and advertised as "A NASCAR Tradition." It is of a unique, somewhat egg-shaped design, an oval with the ends of very different configurations, a condition which supposedly arose from the proximity of one end of the track to a minnow pond the owner refused to relocate. This situation makes it very challenging for the crews to set up their cars' handling in a way that is effective at both ends.

=== Entry list ===
- (R) denotes rookie driver.

#	Driver	Team	Make
1	Rick Mast	Precision Products Racing	Ford
2	Rusty Wallace	Penske Racing South	Pontiac
3	Dale Earnhardt	Richard Childress Racing	Chevrolet
4	Ernie Irvan	Morgan–McClure Motorsports	Chevrolet
5	Ricky Rudd	Hendrick Motorsports	Chevrolet
6	Mark Martin	Roush Racing	Ford
7	Alan Kulwicki	AK Racing	Ford
8	Sterling Marlin	Stavola Brothers Racing	Ford
11	Bill Elliott	Junior Johnson & Associates	Ford
12	Jimmy Spencer	Bobby Allison Motorsports	Ford
14	Terry Labonte	Hagan Racing	Chevrolet
15	Geoff Bodine	Bud Moore Engineering	Ford
16	Wally Dallenbach Jr.	Roush Racing	Ford
17	Darrell Waltrip	Darrell Waltrip Motorsports	Chevrolet
18	Dale Jarrett	Joe Gibbs Racing	Chevrolet
21	Morgan Shepherd	Wood Brothers Racing	Ford
22	Bobby Labonte (R)	Bill Davis Racing	Ford
24	Jeff Gordon (R)	Hendrick Motorsports	Chevrolet
25	Ken Schrader	Hendrick Motorsports	Chevrolet
26	Brett Bodine	King Racing	Ford
27	Hut Stricklin	Junior Johnson & Associates	Ford
28	Davey Allison	Robert Yates Racing	Ford
30	Michael Waltrip	Bahari Racing	Pontiac
33	Harry Gant	Leo Jackson Motorsports	Chevrolet
40	Kenny Wallace (R)	SABCO Racing	Pontiac
41	Phil Parsons	Larry Hedrick Motorsports	Chevrolet
42	Kyle Petty	SABCO Racing	Pontiac
44	Rick Wilson	Petty Enterprises	Pontiac
48	James Hylton	Hylton Motorsports	Pontiac
52	Jimmy Means	Jimmy Means Racing	Ford
53	Mike Potter	Jimmy Means Racing	Ford
55	Ted Musgrave	RaDiUs Motorsports	Ford
57	Bob Schacht	Stringer Motorsports	Oldsmobile
62	John McFadden	Jimmy Means Racing	Ford
63	Norm Benning	O'Neil Racing	Oldsmobile
68	Bobby Hamilton	TriStar Motorsports	Ford
71	Dave Marcis	Marcis Auto Racing	Chevrolet
75	Dick Trickle	Butch Mock Motorsports	Ford
90	Bobby Hillin Jr.	Donlavey Racing	Ford
98	Derrike Cope	Cale Yarborough Motorsports	Ford

== Qualifying ==
Two round of qualifying were scheduled to be held on Friday, March 26, and Saturday, March 27. However, Friday's sessions were cancelled due to rain, with both rounds then scheduled to commence on Saturday. However, Saturday's sessions would also be cancelled due to rain, leaving qualifying to be determined by a system of owner's points and postmarks on entry list blanks. The top 30 positions would be determined by the current 1993 owner's points, while the final nine spots would be determined by a system of provisionals that included past winners, and finally postmarks. As a result, Richard Childress Racing driver Dale Earnhardt won the pole.

John McFadden was the only driver to fail to qualify.

=== Full qualifying results ===
Pos.	#	Driver	Team	Make
1	3	Dale Earnhardt	Richard Childress Racing	Chevrolet
2	15	Geoff Bodine	Bud Moore Engineering	Ford
3	2	Rusty Wallace	Penske Racing South	Pontiac
4	18	Dale Jarrett	Joe Gibbs Racing	Chevrolet
5	24	Jeff Gordon (R)	Hendrick Motorsports	Chevrolet
6	6	Mark Martin	Roush Racing	Ford
7	4	Ernie Irvan	Morgan–McClure Motorsports	Chevrolet
8	21	Morgan Shepherd	Wood Brothers Racing	Ford
9	28	Davey Allison	Robert Yates Racing	Ford
10	27	Hut Stricklin	Junior Johnson & Associates	Ford
11	12	Jimmy Spencer	Bobby Allison Motorsports	Ford
12	55	Ted Musgrave	RaDiUs Motorsports	Ford
13	5	Ricky Rudd	Hendrick Motorsports	Chevrolet
14	7	Alan Kulwicki	AK Racing	Ford
15	42	Kyle Petty	Team SABCO	Pontiac
16	25	Ken Schrader	Hendrick Motorsports	Chevrolet
17	14	Terry Labonte	Hagan Racing	Chevrolet
18	8	Sterling Marlin	Stavola Brothers Racing	Ford
19	26	Brett Bodine	King Racing	Ford
20	33	Harry Gant	Leo Jackson Motorsports	Chevrolet
21	30	Michael Waltrip	Bahari Racing	Pontiac
22	16	Wally Dallenbach Jr.	Roush Racing	Ford
23	98	Derrike Cope	Cale Yarborough Motorsports	Ford
24	41	Phil Parsons	Larry Hedrick Motorsports	Chevrolet
25	17	Darrell Waltrip	Darrell Waltrip Motorsports	Chevrolet
26	40	Kenny Wallace (R)	Team SABCO	Pontiac
27	68	Bobby Hamilton	TriStar Motorsports	Ford
28	11	Bill Elliott	Junior Johnson & Associates	Ford
29	90	Bobby Hillin Jr.	Donlavey Racing	Ford
30	44	Rick Wilson	Petty Enterprises	Pontiac
Provisionals
31	1	Rick Mast	Precision Products Racing	Ford
32	75	Dick Trickle	Butch Mock Motorsports	Ford
33	52	Jimmy Means	Jimmy Means Racing	Ford
34	71	Dave Marcis	Marcis Auto Racing	Chevrolet
35	57	Bob Schacht	Stringer Motorsports	Oldsmobile
36	22	Bobby Labonte (R)	Bill Davis Racing	Ford
37	48	James Hylton	Hylton Motorsports	Pontiac
38	53	Mike Potter	Jimmy Means Racing	Ford
39	63	Norm Benning	O'Neil Racing	Oldsmobile
Failed to qualify
40	62	John McFadden	Jimmy Means Racing	Ford
Official starting lineup

== Race results ==
Fin	St	#	Driver	Team	Make	Laps	Led	Status	Pts	Winnings
1	1	3	Dale Earnhardt	Richard Childress Racing	Chevrolet	367	212	running	185	$64,815
2	6	6	Mark Martin	Roush Racing	Ford	367	123	running	175	$38,875
3	4	18	Dale Jarrett	Joe Gibbs Racing	Chevrolet	367	1	running	170	$30,685
4	16	25	Ken Schrader	Hendrick Motorsports	Chevrolet	367	2	running	165	$23,125
5	3	2	Rusty Wallace	Penske Racing South	Pontiac	366	0	running	155	$20,400
6	14	7	Alan Kulwicki	AK Racing	Ford	366	2	running	155	$25,725
7	15	42	Kyle Petty	Team SABCO	Pontiac	366	19	running	151	$17,345
8	2	15	Geoff Bodine	Bud Moore Engineering	Ford	366	2	running	147	$17,515
9	17	14	Terry Labonte	Hagan Racing	Chevrolet	366	1	running	143	$14,435
10	8	21	Morgan Shepherd	Wood Brothers Racing	Ford	365	0	running	134	$16,930
11	9	28	Davey Allison	Robert Yates Racing	Ford	365	1	running	135	$18,325
12	19	26	Brett Bodine	King Racing	Ford	364	0	running	127	$13,995
13	22	16	Wally Dallenbach Jr.	Roush Racing	Ford	363	0	running	124	$13,715
14	28	11	Bill Elliott	Junior Johnson & Associates	Ford	363	0	running	121	$17,910
15	31	1	Rick Mast	Precision Products Racing	Ford	363	0	running	118	$13,505
16	25	17	Darrell Waltrip	Darrell Waltrip Motorsports	Chevrolet	363	3	running	120	$17,135
17	23	98	Derrike Cope	Cale Yarborough Motorsports	Ford	360	0	running	112	$12,680
18	36	22	Bobby Labonte (R)	Bill Davis Racing	Ford	353	0	running	109	$8,545
19	13	5	Ricky Rudd	Hendrick Motorsports	Chevrolet	353	0	running	106	$12,100
20	32	75	Dick Trickle	Butch Mock Motorsports	Ford	348	0	running	103	$7,270
21	18	8	Sterling Marlin	Stavola Brothers Racing	Ford	346	0	running	100	$11,600
22	7	4	Ernie Irvan	Morgan–McClure Motorsports	Chevrolet	315	0	overheating	97	$16,080
23	27	68	Bobby Hamilton	TriStar Motorsports	Ford	311	0	engine	94	$8,260
24	5	24	Jeff Gordon (R)	Hendrick Motorsports	Chevrolet	275	1	handling	96	$7,740
25	34	71	Dave Marcis	Marcis Auto Racing	Chevrolet	258	0	engine	88	$7,970
26	30	44	Rick Wilson	Petty Enterprises	Pontiac	250	0	engine	85	$7,755
27	35	57	Bob Schacht	Stringer Motorsports	Oldsmobile	246	0	rear end	82	$5,940
28	10	27	Hut Stricklin	Junior Johnson & Associates	Ford	234	0	engine	79	$10,530
29	11	12	Jimmy Spencer	Bobby Allison Motorsports	Ford	212	0	crash	76	$10,370
30	12	55	Ted Musgrave	RaDiUs Motorsports	Ford	188	0	engine	73	$10,310
31	33	52	Jimmy Means	Jimmy Means Racing	Ford	170	0	head gasket	70	$5,675
32	26	40	Kenny Wallace (R)	Team SABCO	Pontiac	169	0	head gasket	67	$5,640
33	21	30	Michael Waltrip	Bahari Racing	Pontiac	148	0	overheating	64	$10,130
34	37	48	James Hylton	Hylton Motorsports	Pontiac	62	0	handling	61	$5,545
35	29	90	Bobby Hillin Jr.	Donlavey Racing	Ford	52	0	engine	58	$5,510
36	24	41	Phil Parsons	Larry Hedrick Motorsports	Chevrolet	48	0	camshaft	55	$7,000
37	20	33	Harry Gant	Leo Jackson Motorsports	Chevrolet	20	0	engine	52	$14,460
38	38	53	Mike Potter	Jimmy Means Racing	Ford	4	0	handling	49	$5,440
39	39	63	Norm Benning	O'Neil Racing	Oldsmobile	1	0	handling	46	$5,410
Official race results

== Standings after the race ==
Drivers' Championship standings

	Pos	Driver	Points
	1	Dale Earnhardt	804
1	2	Rusty Wallace	747 (-57)
1	3	Geoff Bodine	747 (-57)
	4	Dale Jarrett	730 (–74)
1	5	Mark Martin	708 (–96)
3	6	Davey Allison	644 (–160)
1	7	Morgan Shepherd	644 (–160)
3	8	Jeff Gordon	632 (–172)
5	9	Alan Kulwicki	625 (–179)
3	10	Ernie Irvan	624 (–180)
Official driver's standings

- Note: Only the first 10 positions are included for the driver standings.

Previous race: 1993 Motorcraft Quality Parts 500	NASCAR Winston Cup Series; 1993 season	Next race: 1993 Food City 500
