= 1993 Food City 500 =

Sixth race of the 1993 NASCAR Winston Cup Series

Race details
- Race 6 of 30 in the 1993 NASCAR Winston Cup Series
- The 1993 Food City 500 program cover, featuring Larry Carrier.
- Date: April 4, 1993
- Official name: 33rd Annual Food City 500
- Location: Bristol, Tennessee, Bristol Motor Speedway
- Course: Permanent racing facility
- Course length: 0.533 miles (0.858 km)
- Distance: 500 laps, 266.5 mi (428.89 km)
- Average speed: 84.73 miles per hour (136.36 km/h)
- Attendance: 68,000

Pole position
Driver	Rusty Wallace	Penske Racing South
- Time: 15.866

Most laps led
Driver	Rusty Wallace	Penske Racing South
- Laps: 376

Winner
No. 2	Rusty Wallace	Penske Racing South

Television in the United States
- Network: ESPN
- Announcers: Bob Jenkins, Ned Jarrett, Benny Parsons

Radio in the United States
- Radio: Motor Racing Network

The 1993 Food City 500 was the sixth stock car race of the 1993 NASCAR Winston Cup Series season and the 33rd iteration of the event. The race was held on Sunday, April 4, 1993, in Bristol, Tennessee, at Bristol Motor Speedway, a 0.533 miles (0.858 km) permanent oval-shaped racetrack. The race took the scheduled 500 laps to complete. At race's end, Penske Racing South driver Rusty Wallace would manage to dominate a majority of the race to take his 23rd career NASCAR Winston Cup Series victory and his second victory of the season. To fill out the top three, Richard Childress Racing driver Dale Earnhardt and SABCO Racing driver Kyle Petty would finish second and third, respectively.

The race weekend was marred by the death of Alan Kulwicki, last year's champion. Kulwicki had died while traveling to Bristol Motor Speedway in an airplane crash on the evening of Thursday, April 1. As a result, his team would withdraw from the race.

== Background ==
The layout of Bristol Motor Speedway, the venue where the race was held.

The Bristol Motor Speedway, formerly known as Bristol International Raceway and Bristol Raceway, is a NASCAR short track venue located in Bristol, Tennessee. Constructed in 1960, it held its first NASCAR race on July 30, 1961. Despite its short length, Bristol is among the most popular tracks on the NASCAR schedule because of its distinct features, which include extraordinarily steep banking, an all concrete surface, two pit roads, and stadium-like seating. It has also been named one of the loudest NASCAR tracks.

=== Entry list ===
- (R) denotes rookie driver.

#	Driver	Team	Make
1	Rick Mast	Precision Products Racing	Ford
2	Rusty Wallace	Penske Racing South	Pontiac
3	Dale Earnhardt	Richard Childress Racing	Chevrolet
4	Ernie Irvan	Morgan–McClure Motorsports	Chevrolet
5	Ricky Rudd	Hendrick Motorsports	Chevrolet
6	Mark Martin	Roush Racing	Ford
7	Alan Kulwicki*	AK Racing	Ford
8	Sterling Marlin	Stavola Brothers Racing	Ford
11	Bill Elliott	Junior Johnson & Associates	Ford
12	Jimmy Spencer	Bobby Allison Motorsports	Ford
14	Terry Labonte	Hagan Racing	Chevrolet
15	Geoff Bodine	Bud Moore Engineering	Ford
16	Wally Dallenbach Jr.	Roush Racing	Ford
17	Darrell Waltrip	Darrell Waltrip Motorsports	Chevrolet
18	Dale Jarrett	Joe Gibbs Racing	Chevrolet
20	Joe Ruttman	Moroso Racing	Ford
21	Morgan Shepherd	Wood Brothers Racing	Ford
22	Bobby Labonte (R)	Bill Davis Racing	Ford
24	Jeff Gordon (R)	Hendrick Motorsports	Chevrolet
25	Ken Schrader	Hendrick Motorsports	Chevrolet
26	Brett Bodine	King Racing	Ford
27	Hut Stricklin	Junior Johnson & Associates	Ford
28	Davey Allison	Robert Yates Racing	Ford
30	Michael Waltrip	Bahari Racing	Pontiac
33	Harry Gant	Leo Jackson Motorsports	Chevrolet
40	Kenny Wallace (R)	SABCO Racing	Pontiac
41	Phil Parsons	Larry Hedrick Motorsports	Chevrolet
42	Kyle Petty	SABCO Racing	Pontiac
44	Rick Wilson	Petty Enterprises	Pontiac
48	James Hylton	Hylton Motorsports	Pontiac
52	Jimmy Means	Jimmy Means Racing	Ford
55	Ted Musgrave	RaDiUs Motorsports	Ford
68	Bobby Hamilton	TriStar Motorsports	Ford
71	Dave Marcis	Marcis Auto Racing	Chevrolet
75	Dick Trickle	Butch Mock Motorsports	Ford
83	Lake Speed	Speed Racing	Ford
90	Bobby Hillin Jr.	Donlavey Racing	Ford
98	Derrike Cope	Cale Yarborough Motorsports	Ford

*Withdrew due to Kulwicki dying in a plane crash.

== Qualifying ==
Qualifying was split into two rounds. The first round was held on Friday, April 2, at 3:00 PM EST. Each driver would have one lap to set a time. During the first round, the top 20 drivers in the round would be guaranteed a starting spot in the race. If a driver was not able to guarantee a spot in the first round, they had the option to scrub their time from the first round and try and run a faster lap time in a second round qualifying run, held on Saturday, April 3, at 10:30 AM EST. As with the first round, each driver would have one lap to set a time. For this specific race, positions 21-32 would be decided on time, and depending on who needed it, a select amount of positions were given to cars who had not otherwise qualified but were high enough in owner's points; up to two were given. If needed, a past champion who did not qualify on either time or provisionals could use a champion's provisional, adding one more spot to the field.

Rusty Wallace, driving for Penske Racing South, won the pole, setting a time of 15.866 and an average speed of 120.938 mph (194.631 km/h) in the first round.

Two drivers would fail to qualify.

=== Full qualifying results ===
Pos.	#	Driver	Team	Make	Time	Speed
1	2	Rusty Wallace	Penske Racing South	Pontiac	15.866	120.938
2	26	Brett Bodine	King Racing	Ford	15.913	120.581
3	4	Ernie Irvan	Morgan–McClure Motorsports	Chevrolet	15.926	120.482
4	21	Morgan Shepherd	Wood Brothers Racing	Ford	15.931	120.444
5	15	Geoff Bodine	Bud Moore Engineering	Ford	15.944	120.346
6	3	Dale Earnhardt	Richard Childress Racing	Chevrolet	15.958	120.241
7	25	Ken Schrader	Hendrick Motorsports	Chevrolet	15.976	120.105
8	6	Mark Martin	Roush Racing	Ford	15.989	120.008
9	5	Ricky Rudd	Hendrick Motorsports	Chevrolet	15.989	120.008
10	28	Davey Allison	Robert Yates Racing	Ford	15.991	119.992
11	68	Bobby Hamilton	TriStar Motorsports	Ford	16.015	119.813
12	98	Derrike Cope	Cale Yarborough Motorsports	Ford	16.052	119.537
13	90	Bobby Hillin Jr.	Donlavey Racing	Ford	16.054	119.522
14	42	Kyle Petty	SABCO Racing	Pontiac	16.057	119.499
15	30	Michael Waltrip	Bahari Racing	Pontiac	16.073	119.380
16	83	Lake Speed	Speed Racing	Ford	16.116	119.062
17	8	Sterling Marlin	Stavola Brothers Racing	Ford	16.128	118.973
18	14	Terry Labonte	Hagan Racing	Chevrolet	16.166	118.694
19	1	Rick Mast	Precision Products Racing	Ford	16.176	118.620
20	11	Bill Elliott	Junior Johnson & Associates	Ford	16.186	118.547
Failed to lock in Round 1
21	24	Jeff Gordon (R)	Hendrick Motorsports	Chevrolet	15.888	120.770
22	18	Dale Jarrett	Joe Gibbs Racing	Chevrolet	15.979	120.083
23	27	Hut Stricklin	Junior Johnson & Associates	Ford	15.999	119.932
24	44	Rick Wilson	Petty Enterprises	Pontiac	16.005	119.888
25	16	Wally Dallenbach Jr.	Roush Racing	Ford	16.029	119.708
26	33	Harry Gant	Leo Jackson Motorsports	Chevrolet	16.031	119.693
27	20	Joe Ruttman	Moroso Racing	Ford	16.087	119.276
28	12	Jimmy Spencer	Bobby Allison Motorsports	Ford	16.099	119.188
29	41	Phil Parsons	Larry Hedrick Motorsports	Chevrolet	16.170	118.664
30	40	Kenny Wallace (R)	SABCO Racing	Pontiac	16.187	118.540
31	52	Jimmy Means	Jimmy Means Racing	Ford	16.190	118.518
32	55	Ted Musgrave	RaDiUs Motorsports	Ford	16.195	118.481
Provisionals
33	22	Bobby Labonte (R)	Bill Davis Racing	Ford	-*	-*
34	75	Dick Trickle	Butch Mock Motorsports	Ford	-*	-*
Champion's Provisional
35	17	Darrell Waltrip	Darrell Waltrip Motorsports	Chevrolet	-*	-*
Failed to qualify
36	48	James Hylton	Hylton Motorsports	Pontiac	-*	-*
37	71	Dave Marcis	Marcis Auto Racing	Chevrolet	-*	-*
WD	7	Alan Kulwicki	AK Racing	Ford	-	-
Official first round qualifying results
Official starting lineup

== Race results ==
Fin	St	#	Driver	Team	Make	Laps	Led	Status	Pts	Winnings
1	1	2	Rusty Wallace	Penske Racing South	Pontiac	500	376	running	185	$107,610
2	6	3	Dale Earnhardt	Richard Childress Racing	Chevrolet	500	15	running	175	$47,760
3	14	42	Kyle Petty	SABCO Racing	Pontiac	500	0	running	165	$31,485
4	28	12	Jimmy Spencer	Bobby Allison Motorsports	Ford	500	2	running	165	$26,050
5	10	28	Davey Allison	Robert Yates Racing	Ford	500	1	running	160	$25,180
6	35	17	Darrell Waltrip	Darrell Waltrip Motorsports	Chevrolet	500	0	running	150	$23,405
7	4	21	Morgan Shepherd	Wood Brothers Racing	Ford	499	10	running	151	$17,305
8	8	6	Mark Martin	Roush Racing	Ford	498	43	running	147	$19,055
9	2	26	Brett Bodine	King Racing	Ford	497	4	running	143	$16,150
10	19	1	Rick Mast	Precision Products Racing	Ford	497	0	running	134	$17,650
11	25	16	Wally Dallenbach Jr.	Roush Racing	Ford	496	0	running	130	$14,950
12	12	98	Derrike Cope	Cale Yarborough Motorsports	Ford	494	0	running	127	$15,500
13	30	40	Kenny Wallace (R)	SABCO Racing	Pontiac	494	0	running	124	$9,825
14	15	30	Michael Waltrip	Bahari Racing	Pontiac	492	18	running	126	$13,875
15	32	55	Ted Musgrave	RaDiUs Motorsports	Ford	488	0	running	118	$13,825
16	31	52	Jimmy Means	Jimmy Means Racing	Ford	484	0	running	115	$8,450
17	21	24	Jeff Gordon (R)	Hendrick Motorsports	Chevrolet	481	0	crash	112	$9,400
18	5	15	Geoff Bodine	Bud Moore Engineering	Ford	469	1	running	114	$16,350
19	27	20	Joe Ruttman	Moroso Racing	Ford	467	0	running	106	$8,340
20	17	8	Sterling Marlin	Stavola Brothers Racing	Ford	443	0	running	103	$13,200
21	18	14	Terry Labonte	Hagan Racing	Chevrolet	440	0	running	100	$12,950
22	34	75	Dick Trickle	Butch Mock Motorsports	Ford	440	0	running	97	$8,050
23	3	4	Ernie Irvan	Morgan–McClure Motorsports	Chevrolet	409	0	crash	94	$17,900
24	33	22	Bobby Labonte (R)	Bill Davis Racing	Ford	397	0	crash	91	$7,925
25	24	44	Rick Wilson	Petty Enterprises	Pontiac	392	0	running	88	$9,630
26	9	5	Ricky Rudd	Hendrick Motorsports	Chevrolet	369	0	crash	85	$12,500
27	23	27	Hut Stricklin	Junior Johnson & Associates	Ford	352	0	running	82	$12,425
28	26	33	Harry Gant	Leo Jackson Motorsports	Chevrolet	329	0	running	79	$16,775
29	16	83	Lake Speed	Speed Racing	Ford	305	0	engine	76	$7,745
30	20	11	Bill Elliott	Junior Johnson & Associates	Ford	303	0	crash	73	$17,620
31	29	41	Phil Parsons	Larry Hedrick Motorsports	Chevrolet	254	0	engine	70	$8,395
32	22	18	Dale Jarrett	Joe Gibbs Racing	Chevrolet	207	30	crash	72	$15,420
33	13	90	Bobby Hillin Jr.	Donlavey Racing	Ford	119	0	oil pump	64	$6,420
34	7	25	Ken Schrader	Hendrick Motorsports	Chevrolet	51	0	crash	61	$10,970
35	11	68	Bobby Hamilton	TriStar Motorsports	Ford	27	0	engine	58	$7,025
Official race results

== Standings after the race ==
Drivers' Championship standings

	Pos	Driver	Points
	1	Dale Earnhardt	979
	2	Rusty Wallace	932 (-47)
	3	Geoff Bodine	861 (-118)
1	4	Mark Martin	855 (–124)
1	5	Davey Allison	804 (–175)
2	6	Dale Jarrett	802 (–177)
	7	Morgan Shepherd	795 (–184)
3	8	Kyle Petty	774 (–205)
1	9	Jeff Gordon	744 (–235)
5	10	Jimmy Spencer	738 (–241)
Official driver's standings

- Note: Only the first 10 positions are included for the driver standings.

Previous race: 1993 TranSouth 500	NASCAR Winston Cup Series; 1993 season	Next race: 1993 First Union 400
