= Shaun Young =

Australian cricketer (born 1970)

Personal information
- Born: 13 June 1970 (age 56); Burnie, Tasmania, Australia
- Height: 173 cm (5 ft 8 in)
- Batting: Left-handed
- Bowling: Right-arm fast-medium
- Role: All-rounder

International information
- National side: Australia
- Only Test (cap 372): 21 August 1997 v England

Domestic team information
- Years: Team
- 1991/92–2001/02: Tasmania
- 1997: Gloucestershire
- 2001–2003: Bedfordshire

Career statistics
Competition	Test	FC	LA
Matches	1	138	102
Runs scored	4	7,212	2,486
Batting average	4.00	37.95	32.28
100s/50s	0/0	14/44	1/18
Top score	4*	237	146*
Balls bowled	48	20,630	4,313
Wickets	0	274	88
Bowling average	–	35.82	34.50
5 wickets in innings	–	8	1
10 wickets in match	–	1	0
Best bowling	–	7/64	5/39
Catches/stumpings	0/–	82/–	34/–
- Source: Cricinfo, 6 August 2019

Shaun Young (born 13 June 1970) is an Australian Football administrator for Eastlake Football Club, Canberra, and former professional cricketer who played in a single Test match for Australia in 1997. He played for Tasmania in Australian domestic cricket.

== Early life and career ==
Young was born in Burnie, Tasmania in 1970. He made his senior debut for Tasmania in October 1990, having played age group cricket for the state. He established himself as an all-rounder in the Tasmanian side, making his first-class cricket debut in the Sheffield Shield the following season and going on to play in over 100 Shield matches for the state side. He was considered "one of Tasmania's most reliable cricketers" who scored important runs and bowled "tight, competitive spells" for the state side.

== Test cricketer ==
He had one season playing English county cricket, playing for Gloucestershire County Cricket Club during 1997. After making his highest score, 237 runs made against Derbyshire in July, he was called into the Australian touring side as a replacement after a series of bowling injuries and the return to Australia of Paul Reiffel for the birth of a child. Young had played for Young Australia during their tour of England in 1995 and was in England when a replacement was required. He played in a tour match against Kent alongside Shane Lee, another replacement who was called up from the Lancashire League, and was named in the side for the final Test of the 1997 Ashes series at The Oval.

Young went wicketless in the match and scored four runs in Australia's second innings, having been dismissed for a duck in their first innings. He played once for Australia A against the touring Pakistanis in 1996, but the Oval Test was his only appearance for the full Australian side.

== Later career ==
After the 2001/02 Australian season Young was released by Tasmania and moved into Australian Football administration, becoming general manager of the Tasmanian Football League in 2010 after holding other roles within AFL Tasmania. He moved to become the general manager at Eastlake Football Club in Canberra in 2016. He played Lancashire League cricket for Bacup Cricket Club between 2001 and 2003, as well as making seven appearances for Bedfordshire County Cricket Club in the Cheltenham & Gloucester Trophy during the same period.

Young's brother, Claye Young, also played for Tasmania.

== See also ==
- One-Test wonder
