= Claye Young =

Australian cricketer (born 1964)

Personal information
- Full name: Claye Michael Young
- Born: 31 December 1964 (age 61); Hobart, Tasmania, Australia
- Batting: Right-handed
- Bowling: Right-arm fast-medium
- Relatives: Shaun Young (brother)

Domestic team information
- Years: Team
- 1988: Tasmania
- FC debut: 23 January 1988 Tasmania v Sri Lankans
- Last FC: 24 February 1988 Tasmania v Queensland

Career statistics
| Competition | First-class |
|---|---|
| Matches | 3 |
| Runs scored | 1 |
| Batting average | 1.00 |
| 100s/50s | 0/0 |
| Top score | 1* |
| Balls bowled | 417 |
| Wickets | 11 |
| Bowling average | 33.00 |
| 5 wickets in innings | 1 |
| 10 wickets in match | 0 |
| Best bowling | 6/120 |
| Catches/stumpings | 0/– |
- Source: CricketArchive, 2 January 2011

Claye Michael Young (31 December 1964) is a former Australian cricketer, who played three first-class cricket matches for Tasmania in the 1987–88 season.

Young was a right-arm fast-medium bowler who performed well in the Tasmanian Grade Cricket competition, earning him a call up to the state side in 1987. Although performing well in one match, taking figures of 6/120 in one innings, he failed to cement a place in the side, and was not recalled.

He was born at Hobart in 1964 and is the older brother of Shaun Young who played over 100 first-class matches for Tasmania.
