= Hensley Motorsports =

Former American stock car team

- Owner: Hubert Hensley
- Series: NASCAR Busch Series
- Race drivers: Chuck Bown, Mike Swaim, Larry Pollard
- Manufacturer: Chevrolet, Toyota, Ford
- Opened: 1982
- Closed: 2002

Career
- Drivers' Championships: 1
- Race victories: 11

Hensley Motorsports is a former American stock car racing team that ran from 1982 to 2002. It primarily fielded entries in the NASCAR Busch Series, and was owned by Hubert Hensley. The team won eleven races throughout its history, including winning a championship in 1990 with Chuck Bown.

On April 8, 2010, Hensley died at the age of 78.

== Motorsports results ==
=== Busch Series ===
==== Car No. 63 results ====
Year	Driver	No.	Make	1	2	3	4	5	6	7	8	9	10	11	12	13	14	15	16	17	18	19	20	21	22	23	24	25	26	27	28	29	30	31	32	33	34	35	Owners	Pts
1982	Jimmy Hensley	63	Pontiac	DAY	RCH	BRI	MAR; 7	DAR	HCY	SBO; 3	CRW; 2	RCH; 17	LGY	DOV	HCY	CLT	ASH	HCY	SBO; 13	CAR	CRW; 4	SBO; 7	HCY	LGY	IRP; 4	BRI	HCY	RCH	MAR; 18	CLT	HCY; 10	MAR; 23								
1983	Jimmy Hensley	63	Pontiac	DAY	RCH; 25	CAR	HCY	MAR; 22	NWS	SBO; 6	GPS; 17	LGY; 16	DOV	BRI; 8	CLT	SBO; 15	HCY; 8	ROU	SBO	ROU	CRW	ROU	SBO	HCY; 9	LGY	IRP; 9	GPS; 4	BRI; 15	HCY; 12	DAR	RCH; 6	NWS	SBO; 19	MAR; 6	ROU; 5	CLT	HCY; 20	MAR; 5		
1984	Jeff Hensley	63	Pontiac	DAY	RCH	CAR	HCY	MAR	DAR; 22	ROU	NSV	LGY	MLW; 12	DOV; 9	CLT	SBO	HCY; 14	ROU; 15	SBO; 24	ROU	HCY	IRP	LGY	SBO	BRI	DAR	RCH	NWS	CLT	HCY	CAR	MAR								
1985	Jeff Hensley	63	Olds	DAY	CAR	HCY	BRI	MAR	DAR	SBO	LGY	DOV; 23	CLT; 20	SBO	HCY	ROU	IRP	SBO	LGY	HCY	MLW	BRI	DAR	RCH	NWS	ROU	CLT	HCY	CAR	MAR										
1986	Jimmy Hensley	63	Olds	DAY; 18	CAR; 12				DAR; 19				DOV; 14	CLT; 17						RAL; 12							DAR; 12		DOV; 8			CLT; 19	CAR; 6							
1986	Jimmy Hensley	63	Pontiac			HCY; 17		BRI; 13									ROU; 11	IRP; 11	SBO; 5		OXF; 13	SBO; 7	HCY; 9	LGY; 13		BRI; 21														
1986	Jimmy Hensley	63	Chevy				MAR; 18			SBO; 5	LGY; 25	JFC; 15			SBO; 11	HCY; 18									ROU; 11			RCH; 7		MAR; 6	ROU; 18			MAR; 4*						
1987	Larry Pollard	63	Chevy	DAY; 19	HCY; 10	MAR; 12	DAR; 35	BRI; 13	LGY; 5	SBO; 12	CLT; 27	DOV; 5	IRP; 26	ROU; 10	JFC; 10	OXF	SBO; 24	HCY; 14	RAL; 6	LGY; 1	ROU; 17	BRI; 22	JFC; 6	DAR; 18	RCH; 19	DOV; 26	MAR; 21	CLT; 33	CAR; 31	MAR; 4										
1988	Mike Swaim	63	Chevy	DAY; 13	HCY	CAR; 20	MAR; 17	DAR; 35	BRI; 27	LNG; 20	NZH; 29	SBO; 18	NSV; 12	CLT; 26	DOV	ROU; 20	LAN; 10	LVL; 10	MYB; 10	OXF; 31	SBO; 24	HCY; 20	LNG; 14	IRP; 15	ROU; 19	BRI; 21	DAR; 26	RCH; 19	DOV; 17	MAR; 14	CLT; 41	CAR; 23								
1988	Morgan Shepherd	63	Chevy																														MAR; 6							
1989	Chuck Bown	63	Pontiac	DAY; 32	CAR; 23	MAR; 8	HCY; 19	DAR; 18	BRI; 13	NZH; 23	SBO; 8	LAN; 20	NSV; 8	CLT; 23	DOV; 6	ROU; 26	LVL; 5*	VOL; 3	MYB; 28	SBO; 3*	HCY; 29	DUB; 2*	IRP; 8*	ROU; 15	BRI; 23	DAR; 36	RCH; 34	DOV; 6	MAR; 8	CLT; 22	CAR; 30	MAR; 5								
1990	Chuck Bown	63	Pontiac	DAY; 21	RCH; 6	CAR; 12	MAR; 10	HCY; 3	DAR; 13	BRI; 10	LAN; 1*	SBO; 1	NZH; 3	HCY; 1*	CLT; 17	DOV; 8	ROU; 1*	VOL; 5	MYB; 9	OXF; 1*	NHA; 3	SBO; 2*	DUB; 2	IRP; 4	ROU; 1*	BRI; 17	DAR; 13	RCH; 21	DOV; 12	MAR; 17	CLT; 13	NHA; 24	CAR; 18	MAR; 27						
1991	Chuck Bown	63	Pontiac	DAY; 33	RCH; 12	CAR; 36	MAR; 7	VOL; 10	HCY; 17	DAR; 11	BRI; 10	LAN; 5	SBO; 12	NZH; 1*	CLT; 25	DOV; 19	ROU; 25	HCY; 11	MYB; 1*	GLN; 7	OXF; 12	NHA; 2	SBO; 16	DUB; 1*	IRP; 4*	ROU; 5	BRI; 8	DAR; 17	RCH; 29	DOV; 17	CLT; 23	NHA; 2	CAR; 42	MAR; 2						
1992	Chuck Bown	63	Pontiac	DAY; 32	CAR; 35	RCH; 9	ATL; 41	MAR; 3	DAR; 27	BRI; 12	HCY; 3	LAN; 2	DUB; 18	NZH; 4	CLT; 38	DOV; 23	ROU; 19	MYB; 9	GLN; 7	VOL; 8	NHA; 24	TAL; 12	IRP; 24	ROU; 27	MCH; 15	NHA; 22	BRI; 2	DAR; 28	RCH; 14	DOV; 10		MAR; 24		HCY; 7						
1992	Chuck Bown	63	Chevy																												CLT; 12		CAR; 6							
1993	Chuck Bown	63	Pontiac	DAY; 13	CAR; 10	RCH; 18	DAR; 12	BRI; 25	HCY; 8	ROU; 6	MAR; 5	NZH; 6		DOV; 16	MYB; 12	GLN; 6	MLW; 17	TAL; 26	IRP; 22		NHA; 27	BRI; 5		RCH; 14	DOV; 23	ROU; 3*		MAR; 1		HCY; 2										
1993	Chuck Bown	63	Chevy										CLT; 8							MCH; 10			DAR; 20				CLT; 8		CAR; 13		ATL; 36									
1994	Jim Bown	63	Chevy	DAY; 42	CAR; 14	RCH; 14	ATL; 24	MAR; 18	DAR; 33	HCY; 11	BRI; 5	ROU; 7	NHA; 21	NZH; 33	CLT; 18	DOV; 26	MYB; 8	GLN; 32	MLW; 13	SBO; 10	TAL; 39	HCY; 12	IRP; 34	MCH; 11	BRI; 11	DAR; 38	RCH; 27	DOV; 20	CLT; 6	MAR; 28	CAR; 22									
1995	Curtis Markham	63	Pontiac	DAY; 31	CAR; 19	RCH; 11	ATL; 25	NSV; 31	DAR; 34	BRI; 9	HCY; 8	NHA; 34	NZH; 18	CLT; 16	DOV; 18	MYB; 7	GLN; 8	MLW; 7	TAL; 25	SBO; 26	IRP; 34	MCH; 30	BRI; 28	DAR; 15	RCH; 20	DOV; 22	CLT; 37	CAR; 34	HOM; 10											
1996	Curtis Markham	63	Pontiac	DAY; 5	CAR; 17	RCH; 5	ATL; 27	NSV; 5	DAR; 19	BRI; 20	HCY; 9	NZH; 15	CLT; 30	DOV; 20	SBO; 6	MYB; 9	GLN; 27	MLW; 11	NHA; 15	TAL; 20	IRP; 26	MCH; 28	BRI; 7	DAR; 25	RCH; 20	DOV; 36	CLT; 24	CAR; 24	HOM; 28											
1997	Tracy Leslie	63	Pontiac	DAY; 5	CAR; 28	RCH; 40	ATL; 37	LVS; 18	DAR; 9	HCY; 26	TEX; 10	BRI; 35	NSV; 25	TAL; 17	NHA; 20	NZH; 19		DOV; 27		GLN; 13	MLW; 9	MYB; 14	GTY; 16	IRP; 17	MCH; 34	BRI; 19	DAR; 19	RCH; 36											18th	2971
1997	Tracy Leslie	63	Chevy																SBO; 18										DOV; 7	CLT; 31	CAL; 15	CAR; 37	HOM; 20						18th	2971
1997	Larry Pearson	63	Pontiac														CLT; 24																						18th	2971
1998	Tracy Leslie	63	Pontiac	DAY; 33	CAR; 13																																		22nd	2918
1998	Tracy Leslie	63	Chevy			LVS; 23	NSV; 19	DAR; 38	BRI; 12	TEX; 18	HCY; 28	TAL; 19	NHA; 32	NZH; 37	CLT; 16	DOV; 31	RCH; 31	PPR; 26	GLN; 16	MLW; 20	MYB; 17	CAL; 31	SBO; 22	IRP; 30	MCH; 43	BRI; 11	DAR; 22	RCH; 15											22nd	2918
1998	Casey Atwood	63	Chevy																										DOV; 24	CLT; 16	GTY; 30	CAR; 17	ATL; 11	HOM; 14					22nd	2918
1999	Chuck Bown	63	Chevy	DAY; 11	CAR; 24	LVS; 25	ATL; 40	DAR; 17	TEX; 23	NSV; 40	BRI; 31	TAL; 25	CAL; 35	NHA; 18	RCH; 29	NZH; 31	CLT; 7	DOV; 41	SBO; 22																				28th	2283
1999	Bobby Hamilton Jr.	63	Chevy																	GLN; 26	MLW; 39	MYB; DNQ	PPR; 21	GTY; 28	IRP; 42	MCH; 23	BRI; DNQ												28th	2283
1999	Rich Bickle	63	Chevy																									DAR; 27	RCH; 11	DOV; DNQ			MEM; 39						28th	2283
1999	Rich Bickle	63	Pontiac																															PHO; 27					28th	2283
1999	Steve Grissom	63	Chevy																												CLT; 35								28th	2283
1999	Ed Berrier	63	Chevy																													CAR; DNQ							28th	2283
1999	Curtis Markham	63	Pontiac																																HOM; DNQ				28th	2283
2000	Mark Green	63	Chevy	DAY; 18	CAR; 26	LVS; 27	ATL; 29	DAR; 40	BRI; 13	TEX; 25	NSV; 41	TAL; 7	CAL; 25	RCH; 24	NHA; 25	CLT; DNQ	DOV; 33	SBO; 30	MYB; 29	GLN; 18	MLW; 23	NZH; 42	PPR; 31	GTY; 30	IRP; 18	MCH; 28	BRI; 26	DAR; 36	RCH; 23	DOV; 26	CLT; 33	CAR; 23	MEM; 26	PHO; 33					28th	2490
2000	Mark Green	63	Ford																																HOM; DNQ				28th	2490
2001	Shane Hall	63	Ford	DAY; 12	CAR; 25	LVS; 29	ATL; 28	DAR; 23	BRI; 36	TEX; 38	NSH; 30	TAL; 34	CAL; 33	RCH; 30	NHA; 24	NZH; 21	CLT; 41	DOV; 27	KEN; 22	MLW; 24	GLN; 26	CHI; 31	GTY; 22	PPR; 31	IRP; 24	MCH; 35	BRI; 25	DAR; 28	RCH; 26	DOV; 29	KAN; 29	CLT; 34	MEM; 19	PHO; 19	CAR; 34	HOM; 31			28th	2624
2002	Shane Hall	63	Chevy	DAY; 32					TEX; 40	NSH; 14	TAL; 31	CAL; 27	RCH; 36	NHA; 16	NZH; 29	CLT; 24	DOV; 29	NSH; 30	KEN; 10	MLW; 35	DAY; 31	CHI; 29	GTY; 33	PPR; 15	IRP; 20	MCH; 41	BRI; 26	DAR; 16	RCH; 29							PHO; 23	HOM; 33		27th	2656
2002	Ken Alexander	63	Chevy		CAR; 33	LVS; 35	DAR; 29	BRI; 31																															27th	2656
2002	Ron Young	63	Chevy																											DOV; 32	KAN; 40	CLT; 24	MEM; 25	ATL; 29	CAR; 37				27th	2656
