= Curtis Markham =

American racing driver (born 1959)

- Born: Curtis William Markham; September 21, 1959 (age 67); Richmond, Virginia, U.S.
- Awards: 1992 Busch North Series Rookie of the Year

NASCAR Cup Series career
- 4 races run over 2 years
- Best finish: 78th (1994)
- First race: 1987 Budweiser 500 (Dover)
- Last race: 1994 Purolator 500 (Atlanta)
Wins	Top tens	Poles
0	0	0

NASCAR O'Reilly Auto Parts Series career
- 89 races run over 12 years
- Best finish: 11th (1996)
- First race: 1983 Miller Time 150 (Richmond)
- Last race: 2000 Lysol 200 (Watkins Glen)
Wins	Top tens	Poles
0	18	1

NASCAR FedEx Freight Truck Series career
- 11 races run over 3 years
- Best finish: 38th (1997)
- First race: 1996 Hanes 250 (Martinsville)
- Last race: 1998 Stevens Bell/Genuine Car Parts 200 (Flemington)
Wins	Top tens	Poles
0	1	0
- Statistics up to date as of November 24, 2012.

Curtis William Markham (born September 21, 1959) is an American former NASCAR driver who raced in all three top series.

Born in Richmond, Virginia, Markham made his Busch debut in 1983 driving the No. 94 Frank Edwards Pontiac with a best finish of eighteenth in three starts. In 1984, he made one start in the No. 85 J.R. Racing Olds and finished thirteenth. In 1987, he made his Winston Cup debut with Wayne Beahr in his No. 37 Hanover Printing Ford and finished 38th. In 1989, he drove the No. 88 Buick in two Busch races. In 1991, he drove the No. 75 Food Country USA Olds owned by Charlie Henderson to an eighth place finish at Watkins Glen (BGN). The next year, he drove the No. 7 Skoal Bandit Pontiac to a fifth-place finish at Loudon (BGN). He was 1992 Rookie of the Year in the No. 7 Skoal car in the Busch North Series. He qualified on the pole in the Busch North Series several times. In 1994, he attempted four cup races, but only made one in the No. 02 T.W. Taylor Ford sponsored by Children's Miracle Network and got a DNF. In 1995, he drove the No. 63 Lysol Pontiac owned by Hubert Hensley in his first full BGN season and got his first pole. He finished fifteenth in the points with six top-ten finishes. In his second full season with the No. 63, he improved to eleventh in the points with seven top tens. In 1997, he ran three races and came home fifth at Loudon; he also came in third at Phoenix in the No. 32 truck. The next year, he drove the No. 64 Schneider Chevy to three top-ten finishes. In 1999, he drove the No. 29 and No. 72 Chevys with a best finish of 12th. In 2000, he made his last start with the No. 4 Joe Gibbs Pontiac sponsored by Porter-Cable and ran seventeenth at the Glen.

Markham is currently the shop foreman for Joe Gibbs Racing. After hiring Denny Hamlin, he is also spotting for him and has spotted for several other NASCAR drivers.

== Motorsports career results ==
=== NASCAR ===
(key) (Bold – Pole position awarded by qualifying time. Italics – Pole position earned by points standings or practice time. * – Most laps led.)

==== Winston Cup Series ====
NASCAR Winston Cup Series results
Year	Team	No.	Make	1	2	3	4	5	6	7	8	9	10	11	12	13	14	15	16	17	18	19	20	21	22	23	24	25	26	27	28	29	30	31	NWCC	Pts	Ref
1987	Beahr Racing	37	Ford	DAY	CAR	RCH	ATL	DAR	NWS	BRI	MAR	TAL	CLT	DOV; 38	POC	RSD	MCH	DAY	POC	TAL	GLN	MCH	BRI	DAR	RCH	DOV									92nd	73	
1987	Langley Racing	64	Ford																								MAR; 26	NWS	CLT	CAR; 30	RSD	ATL; 34			92nd	73	
1994	Taylor Racing	02	Ford	DAY	CAR	RCH	ATL; 39	DAR; DNQ	BRI	NWS; DNQ	MAR; DNQ	TAL	SON	CLT	DOV	POC	MCH	DAY	NHA	POC	TAL	IND	GLN	MCH	BRI	DAR	RCH	DOV	MAR	NWS	CLT	CAR	PHO	ATL	78th	46	

==== Busch Series ====
NASCAR Busch Series results
Year	Team	No.	Make	1	2	3	4	5	6	7	8	9	10	11	12	13	14	15	16	17	18	19	20	21	22	23	24	25	26	27	28	29	30	31	32	33	34	35	NBSC	Pts	Ref
1983	J.R. Racing	94	Pontiac	DAY	RCH	CAR	HCY	MAR	NWS	SBO	GPS	LGY	DOV	BRI	CLT	SBO	HCY	ROU	SBO	ROU	CRW	ROU	SBO	HCY	LGY	IRP	GPS	BRI	HCY	DAR	RCH; 21	NWS	SBO	MAR	ROU			MAR; 40	76th	252	
1983	J.R. Racing	47	Pontiac																																	CLT; 18	HCY		76th	252	
1984	J.R. Racing	85	Olds	DAY	RCH	CAR	HCY	MAR	DAR	ROU	NSV	LGY	MLW	DOV	CLT	SBO	HCY	ROU	SBO	ROU	HCY	IRP	LGY	SBO	BRI	DAR	RCH	NWS	CLT; 13	HCY	CAR	MAR							104th	-	
1989	Ken Curley	88	Buick	DAY	CAR	MAR	HCY	DAR	BRI	NZH	SBO	LAN	NSV	CLT	DOV; 22	ROU	LVL	VOL	MYB	SBO	HCY	DUB	IRP	ROU	BRI	DAR; 21	RCH	DOV	MAR	CLT	CAR	MAR							70th	197	
1991		29	Pontiac	DAY	RCH	CAR	MAR; 17	VOL	HCY	DAR	BRI	LAN	SBO	NZH	CLT	DOV	ROU	HCY																					59th	351	
1991	Henderson Motorsports	75	Olds																MYB; 22	GLN; 8	OXF	NHA	SBO	DUB	IRP	ROU	BRI	DAR	RCH	DOV	CLT	NHA	CAR	MAR					59th	351	
1992	Skoal Bandit Racing	7	Pontiac	DAY	CAR	RCH	ATL	MAR	DAR	BRI	HCY	LAN	DUB	NZH	CLT	DOV	ROU	MYB	GLN	VOL	NHA; 5	TAL	IRP	ROU	MCH	NHA; 20	BRI	DAR	RCH	DOV	CLT	MAR	CAR	HCY					69th	258	
1993	Skoal Bandit Racing	71	Pontiac	DAY	CAR	RCH; 35	DAR	BRI	HCY	ROU	MAR																												78th	146	
1993	Skoal Bandit Racing	7	Pontiac									NZH; 17	CLT	DOV	MYB	GLN; 25	MLW	TAL	IRP	MCH	NHA; 16	BRI	DAR	RCH	DOV	ROU	CLT	MAR	CAR	HCY	ATL								78th	146	
1994	Moroso Racing	20	Chevy	DAY	CAR	RCH	ATL	MAR	DAR	HCY	BRI	ROU	NHA	NZH	CLT	DOV	MYB	GLN	MLW	SBO	TAL	HCY	IRP; QL^{†}	MCH	BRI	DAR	RCH	DOV	CLT	MAR	CAR								NA	-	
1995	Hensley Motorsports	63	Pontiac	DAY; 31	CAR; 19	RCH; 11	ATL; 25	NSV; 31	DAR; 34	BRI; 9	HCY; 8	NHA; 34	NZH; 18	CLT; 16	DOV; 18	MYB; 7	GLN; 8	MLW; 7	TAL; 25	**SBO**; 26	IRP; 34	MCH; 30	BRI; 28	DAR; 15	RCH; 20	DOV; 22	CLT; 37	CAR; 34	HOM; 10										15th	2584	
1996	Hensley Motorsports	63	Pontiac	DAY; 5	CAR; 17	RCH; 5	ATL; 27	NSV; 5	DAR; 19	BRI; 20	HCY; 9	NZH; 15	CLT; 30	DOV; 20	SBO; 6	MYB; 9	GLN; 27	MLW; 11	NHA; 15	TAL; 20	IRP; 26	MCH; 28	BRI; 7	DAR; 25	RCH; 20	DOV; 36	CLT; 24	CAR; 24	HOM; 28										11th	2838	
1997	Taylor Motorsports	40	Ford	DAY	CAR	RCH	ATL	LVS	DAR	HCY	TEX	BRI; 42	NSV	TAL																									70th	285	
1997	Shoemaker Racing	64	Chevy												NHA; 12	NZH	CLT	DOV	SBO	GLN	MLW	MYB	GTY	IRP	MCH	BRI	DAR												70th	285	
1997	Marion Sadler	26	Chevy																									RCH; 14	DOV	CLT	CAL	CAR	HOM						70th	285	
1998	Shoemaker Racing	64	Chevy	DAY	CAR	LVS	NSV	DAR	BRI	TEX	HCY	TAL	NHA	NZH	CLT	DOV	RCH	PPR; 6	GLN; 41	MLW	MYB; 14	CAL	SBO; 6	IRP; 35	MCH	BRI	DAR				GTY; 43	CAR; 10							51st	785	
1998	LAR Motorsports	28	Chevy																									RCH; 25	DOV	CLT									51st	785	
1998	NorthStar Motorsports	89	Ford																														ATL; DNQ	HOM					51st	785	
1999	Diamond Ridge Motorsports	29	Chevy	DAY; 12	CAR	LVS	ATL; 37	DAR	TEX	NSV														GTY; 38					RCH; 13	DOV									56th	709	
1999	Grubb Motorsports	83	Chevy								BRI; DNQ	TAL	CAL; DNQ	NHA	RCH																								56th	709	
1999	Labonte Motorsports	44	Chevy													NZH; QL^{‡}	CLT	DOV																					56th	709	
1999	BACE Motorsports	33	Chevy																SBO; DNQ																				56th	709	
1999	Parker Racing	72	Chevy																	GLN; 33	MLW; 42	MYB; DNQ	PPR; 31		IRP; 22	MCH; DNQ	BRI; 38	DAR; DNQ			CLT; DNQ	CAR; 41	MEM	PHO					56th	709	
1999	HVP Motorsports	63	Pontiac																																HOM; DNQ				56th	709	
2000	Joe Gibbs Racing	29	Pontiac	DAY	CAR	LVS	ATL	DAR	BRI	TEX	NSV	TAL	CAL	RCH; DNQ	NHA	CLT	DOV	SBO	MYB					GTY; DNQ	IRP	MCH	BRI	DAR	RCH	DOV	CLT	CAR	MEM	PHO; DNQ	HOM; DNQ				92nd	112	
2000	Joe Gibbs Racing	4	Pontiac																	GLN; 17	MLW	NZH	PPR																92nd	112	
^{†} - Qualified for Randy LaJoie· ^{‡} - Qualified for Terry Labonte

==== Craftsman Truck Series ====
NASCAR Craftsman Truck Series results
Year	Team	No.	Make	1	2	3	4	5	6	7	8	9	10	11	12	13	14	15	16	17	18	19	20	21	22	23	24	25	26	27	NCTC	Pts	Ref
1996	Mike Colabucci	10	Chevy	HOM	PHO	POR	EVG	TUS	CNS	HPT	BRI	NZH	MLW	LVL	I70	IRP	FLM	GLN	NSV	RCH	NHA	MAR; 32	NWS	SON	MMR	PHO	LVS				122nd	67	
1997	Mike Colabucci	13	Chevy	WDW; 9						I70; 16	NHA	TEX																			38th	651	
1997	Active Motorsports	32	Chevy		TUS; DNQ	HOM; 33	PHO; 13	POR	EVG				BRI; 34	NZH	MLW	LVL	CNS	HPT	IRP	FLM	NSV	GLN	RCH	MAR	SON	MMR	CAL	PHO	LVS; 20		38th	651	
1998	Active Motorsports	32	Chevy	WDW; DNQ	HOM; 23	PHO; 34	POR	EVG	I70	GLN	TEX	BRI; 17	MLW	NZH	CAL	PPR	IRP	NHA	FLM; 25	NSV	HPT	LVL	RCH	MEM	GTY	MAR	SON	MMR	PHO	LVS	46th	404	

==== Busch North Series ====
NASCAR Busch North Series results
Year	Team	No.	Make	1	2	3	4	5	6	7	8	9	10	11	12	13	14	15	16	17	18	19	20	21	22	Pos.	Pts	Ref
1992	Skoal Bandit Racing	7	Pontiac	DAY	CAR	RCH	NHA; 9	NZH	MND; 14	OXF; 16	DOV	LEE; 5	JEN; 4	OXF; 11	NHA	OXF; 20	HOL; 6	EPP; 14	NHA; 20	**RPS**; 3	OXF; 18	NHA; 23	**EPP**; 3*			6th	1787	
1993	Skoal Bandit Racing	7	Pontiac	LEE; 12*	NHA; 5	MND; 10	NZH; 17	HOL; 3	**GLN**; 3	JEN; 33	STA; 5	GLN; 25	NHA; 11	WIS; 8	NHA; 7	NHA; 16	**RPS**; 4	TMP; 9	WMM; 7	LEE; 2	EPP; 21	**LRP**; 32				4th	2260	
1994	Hensley Motorsports	63	Chevy	NHA	NHA	MND	NZH	SPE	HOL	GLN	JEN	EPP	GLN	NHA	WIS	STA	TMP	MND	WMM	RPS	LEE	NHA; 38				58th	183	
1994	Skoal Racing	11	Pontiac																				LRP; 10			58th	183	
1995	Hensley Motorsports	63	Pontiac	DAY	NHA	LEE	JEN	NHA	NZH	HOL	BEE	TMP	GLN	NHA	TIO	MND	**GLN**; 4	EPP	RPS	LEE	STA	BEE	NHA	TMP	LRP	71st	160	
1996	Skoal Racing	33	Pontiac	DAY	LEE	JEN	NZH	HOL	NHA	TIO	BEE	TMP	NZH	NHA	STA	GLN	EPP	RPS	LEE	NHA	NHA	BEE	TMP	LRP; 7		78th	146	
1998	Shoemaker Racing	64	Chevy	LEE	RPS	NHA	NZH	HOL	GLN	STA	NHA	DOV; 40	STA	NHA	GLN	EPP	JEN	NHA	THU	TMP	BEE	LRP				105th	43	

=== ARCA Permatex SuperCar Series ===
(key) (Bold – Pole position awarded by qualifying time. Italics – Pole position earned by points standings or practice time. * – Most laps led.)

ARCA Permatex SuperCar Series results
Year	Team	No.	Make	1	2	3	4	5	6	7	8	9	10	11	12	13	14	15	16	17	18	19	APSC	Pts	Ref
1988	Finney Racing	74	Olds	DAY	ATL	TAL	FRS	PCS	ROC	POC	WIN	KIL	ACS	SLM	POC	TAL; 12	DEL	FRS	ISF	DSF	SLM	ATL	114th	-	
1990		92	Buick	DAY	ATL	KIL	TAL	FRS	POC	KIL	TOL	HAG	POC	TAL	MCH	ISF	TOL	DSF	WIN	DEL	ATL; 11		103rd	-	
