= Kelly Moore =

American racing driver (born 1959)

- Born: January 31, 1959 (age 67); Scarborough, Maine, U.S.
- Achievements: 1995 NASCAR Busch North Series champion
- Awards: All-Time Wins Leader in K&N Pro Series East (27); All-Time Poles Leader in K&N Pro Series East (45)

NASCAR O'Reilly Auto Parts Series career
- 37 races run over 12 years
- Best finish: 42nd (1988)
- First race: 1986 Oxford 250 (Oxford)
- Last race: 1999 Lysol 200 (Watkins Glen)
Wins	Top tens	Poles
0	5	2
- Statistics up to date as of April 24, 2018.

Kelly Moore (born January 31, 1959) is an American former professional stock-car racing driver. He has the all-time most wins in the NASCAR Grand National Division, Busch East Series and the driver of the No. 47 NAPA Chevy. He is the father of NASCAR driver Ryan Moore.

== Racing career ==
Moore started with the NASCAR Grand National Division, Busch East Series when the series started in 1987. He was the 1995 champion and is the all-time leader in starts, wins, poles, poles in a season, money, top-fives and top-ten finishes.

Moore also ran some Busch East-Busch Series companion events during much of his career, competing in NASCAR's #2 series. In races spanning from 1986 to 1999, Moore earned five top-ten finishes, bested by a runner-up in 1988 at Oxford Plains Speedway.

== Personal life ==
Moore lives in Scarborough, Maine with his wife, Roxanne and two children, Sarah and Ryan.

== Motorsports career results ==
=== NASCAR ===
(key) (Bold – Pole position awarded by qualifying time. Italics – Pole position earned by points standings or practice time. * – Most laps led.)

==== Busch Series ====
NASCAR Busch Series results
Year	Team	No.	Make	1	2	3	4	5	6	7	8	9	10	11	12	13	14	15	16	17	18	19	20	21	22	23	24	25	26	27	28	29	30	31	32	NBGNC	Pts	Ref
1986	Moore Racing	117	Buick	DAY	CAR	HCY	MAR	BRI	DAR	SBO	LGY	JFC	DOV	CLT	SBO	HCY	ROU	IRP	SBO	RAL	OXF; 33	SBO	HCY	LGY	ROU	BRI	DAR	RCH	DOV	MAR	ROU	CLT	CAR	MAR		114th	-	
1987	Moore Racing	47	Buick	DAY	HCY	MAR	DAR	BRI	LGY	SBO	CLT	DOV	IRP; 18	ROU	JFC	OXF; 12	SBO	HCY	RAL	LGY	ROU	BRI	JFC	DAR	RCH	DOV; 7	MAR	CLT	CAR	MAR						79th	-	
1988	Moore Racing	47	Chevy	DAY	HCY	CAR; 32	MAR																													42nd	548	
1988	Moore Racing	47	Buick																	OXF; 2*	SBO	HCY	LNG													42nd	548	
1988	Moore Racing	4	Buick												DOV; 7	ROU	LAN	LVL	MYB					**IRP**; 10	ROU	BRI	DAR		DOV; 29	MAR	CLT	CAR	MAR			42nd	548	
1988	Mountain Racing	41	Buick					DAR; 36	BRI	LNG	NZH	SBO	NSV	CLT																						42nd	548	
1988	Spraker Racing	69	Chevy																									RCH; 31								42nd	548	
1989	Moore Racing	74	Chevy	DAY; 40	CAR	MAR; 29	HCY	DAR	BRI	NZH; 11	SBO	LAN	NSV	CLT	DOV	ROU	LVL	VOL	MYB	SBO	HCY	DUB	IRP; DNQ	ROU	BRI	DAR	RCH; 33	DOV; 11	MAR	CLT	CAR	MAR				54th	443	
1990	Moore Racing	74	Chevy	DAY; 17																																55th	431	
1990	Moore Racing	47	Chevy		RCH; 33	CAR	MAR	HCY	DAR	BRI	LAN	SBO	NZH	HCY	CLT	DOV	ROU	VOL	MYB	OXF; 19	NHA; 27	SBO	DUB	IRP	ROU	BRI	DAR	RCH	DOV	MAR	CLT	NHA; 32	CAR	MAR		55th	431	
1991	Moore Racing	47	Chevy	DAY	RCH	CAR	MAR	VOL	HCY	DAR	BRI	LAN	SBO	NZH	CLT	DOV	ROU	HCY	MYB	GLN	OXF; 37	NHA; 19	SBO	DUB	IRP	ROU	BRI	DAR	RCH	DOV	CLT	NHA; 9	CAR	MAR		67th	296	
1992	Moore Racing	47	Chevy	DAY	CAR	RCH	ATL	MAR	DAR	BRI	HCY	LAN	DUB	NZH	CLT	DOV	ROU	MYB	GLN	VOL	NHA; 44	TAL	IRP	ROU	MCH	NHA; 14	BRI	DAR	RCH	DOV	CLT	MAR	CAR	HCY		86th	152	
1993	Moore Racing	47	Chevy	DAY	CAR	RCH	DAR	BRI	HCY	ROU	MAR	NZH	CLT	DOV	MYB	GLN; 23	MLW	TAL	IRP	MCH	NHA; 12	BRI	DAR	RCH	DOV	ROU	CLT	MAR	CAR	HCY	ATL					70th	224	
1994	Moore Racing	47	Chevy	DAY	CAR	RCH	ATL	MAR	DAR	HCY	BRI	ROU	NHA; 42	NZH; 21	CLT	DOV	MYB	GLN; 17	MLW	SBO	TAL	HCY	IRP	MCH	BRI	DAR	RCH	DOV	CLT	MAR	CAR					72nd	249	
1995	Moore Racing	4	Ford	DAY	CAR	RCH	ATL	NSV	DAR	BRI	HCY	NHA; DNQ	NZH; 16	CLT	DOV	MYB																				85th	155	
1995	Moore Racing	41	Ford														GLN; 41	MLW	TAL	SBO	IRP	MCH	BRI	DAR	RCH	DOV	CLT	CAR	HOM							85th	155	
1996	Moore Racing	47	Pontiac	DAY	CAR	RCH	ATL	NSV	DAR	BRI	HCY	NZH; 31	CLT	DOV	SBO	MYB	GLN	MLW	NHA	TAL	IRP	MCH	BRI	DAR	RCH	DOV	CLT	CAR	HOM							101st	70	
1999	Moore Racing	48	Pontiac	DAY	CAR	LVS	ATL	DAR	TEX	NSV	BRI	TAL	CAL	NHA; 42	RCH	NZH; 39	CLT	DOV	SBO	GLN; 34	MLW	MYB	PPR	GTY	IRP	MCH	BRI	DAR	RCH	DOV	CLT	CAR; DNQ	MEM; DNQ	PHO	HOM	133rd	37	

Sporting positions
Preceded by Dale Shaw	NASCAR Busch North Series champion 1995	Succeeded by Dave Dion
