= Jeff Hensley =

American racing driver and crew chief

- Born: Jeffrey S. Hensley; November 11, 1962 (age 63); Ridgeway, Virginia, U.S.
- Achievements: 1990 NASCAR Busch Series champion crew chief

NASCAR O'Reilly Auto Parts Series career
- 90 races run over 4 years
- Best finish: 8th (1984)
- First race: 1982 Dogwood 500 (Martinsville)
- Last race: 1985 Winn-Dixie 500 (Martinsville)
Wins	Top tens	Poles
0	24	0

Jeffrey S. Hensley (born November 11, 1962) is an American professional stock car racing driver and crew chief. He works as the crew chief for Tricon Garage on their No. 15 Toyota Tundra in the NASCAR Craftsman Truck Series driven by Tanner Gray.

Hensley is a longtime crew chief in the Truck Series, having previously worked for GMS Racing (three separate stints with them), ThorSport Racing (three separate stints with them), Joe Denette/NTS Motorsports, Kevin Harvick Incorporated, Red Horse Racing, Xpress Motorsports, and Bill Davis Racing. Hensley has also worked as a crew chief in the NASCAR Xfinity Series and is the 1990 championship-winning crew chief in the series when it was known as the Busch Series. Hensley was to return to the Xfinity Series in 2022 working for Our Motorsports but he left the team prior to the start of the season.

== Racing career ==
=== Driving career ===
Hensley began racing at the age of eighteen, racing in various short tracks in Virginia and North Carolina. In 1982, he moved to the newly-formed Busch Grand National Series, competing in the Nos. 2 and 63 for his family-owned team. In his first season of competition, he ran ten races, and had five top-ten finishes. His abbreviated schedule landed him twentieth in points. The following season, he ran twenty-eight of the schedule thirty-five races, and had nine top-ten finishes, and improved to tenth in standings.

Hensley had two less top-tens in 1984, but had a career-best eighth-place finish in points. After he dropped to three top-tens in 1985, in the No. 2 Flute's Sheetmetal car, he retired from driving.

=== Crew chiefing career ===
==== 1987–2001: Hensley Motorsports ====
In 1987, Hensley became the crew chief for his family's No. 63 car in the Busch Series. Larry Pollard drove the car in 1987 and Mike Swaim drove it in 1988. Chuck Bown became the driver of the No. 63 in 1989, and they won the championship together in 1990. They continued to work together until the 1994 season, when Bown left and was replaced by his brother Jim. Hensley continued working for the team until it was sold in 2001.

==== 2004–2010 ====
Following the sale, he worked for Arrington Manufacturers for three years before returning to the track when he was hired by Bill Davis Racing in 2004 to serve as the crew chief for Bill Lester's No. 22 truck. The following season, he was reassigned to the No. 5 of Mike Skinner, where he stayed for two and a half seasons. He and Skinner won eight races and finished second in points during the 2007 season. In the summer of 2008, he left BDR to become the competition director for Bobby Hamilton Racing. However, Hensley left BHR a few months later to return to crew chiefing, and for the last few races of 2008 and all of 2009, Hensley was the crew chief for Brian Scott's No. 16 truck for Xpress Motorsports. After Xpress closed down in 2010, Hensley moved to Red Horse Racing, working as the crew chief for the No. 17 of Timothy Peters, and won the season-opener at Daytona.

==== 2011–2014 ====
Hensley left RHR after 2010 to work for Kevin Harvick Incorporated. Though he initially served as Ron Hornaday's crew chief, he moved to crew chief for Nelson Piquet Jr. and the No. 8 truck, before joining Joe Denette Motorsports for the final race of the season. In 2012, he started the year with JDM, reunited with Hornaday, before moving to Turner Scott Motorsports to crew chief for Miguel Paludo halfway through the season, a role he reprised in 2013.

At the start of the 2014 season, Hensley moved to NTS Motorsports as crew chief for the team's No. 20 truck.

==== 2014–2023: ThorSport Racing & GMS Racing ====
Hensley left NTS midway through the 2014 season for ThorSport Racing where he would be the crew chief for Johnny Sauter's No. 98 truck. In 2015, ThorSport moved him to Cameron Hayley's No. 13 truck. He left the team in 2016 for GMS Racing where he would be the crew chief for their No. 23 truck driven by Spencer Gallagher.

Hensley went back to ThorSport in 2017 and was the crew chief for Grant Enfinger and their No. 98 truck for four years (from 2017 to 2020). He returned to GMS Racing in 2021 and became the crew chief for the No. 23 truck of Chase Purdy.

After the 2021 season, Hensley left GMS to be the crew chief for Brett Moffitt's No. 02 car for Our Motorsports in the Xfinity Series in 2022. It would have been Hensley's first time crew chiefing in the Xfinity Series since 2001 when he was the crew chiefing for his family team's No. 63 car driven by Shane Hall. However, on February 3, 2022, NASCAR on Fox reporter Bob Pockrass revealed in a tweet that Hensley had already left Our Motorsports before the start of the season and would instead go back to ThorSport to crew chief Matt Crafton's No. 88 truck. Crafton's crew chief for the previous ten years, Carl "Junior" Joiner, had retired. Before the race at Mid-Ohio, Hensley would leave ThorSport to return to GMS and the No. 23 truck, which was now driven by Enfinger, who Hensley previously crew chiefed at ThorSport.

==== 2024–present: Tricon Garage ====
GMS closed down after the 2023 season and Hensley joined Tricon Garage in 2024 to be the crew chief of Taylor Gray's No. 17 truck, replacing Jacob Hampton.

On December 16, 2024, Tricon announced that Hensley would move from the No. 17 truck to the No. 15 truck in 2025 where he would crew chief Taylor's older brother Tanner Gray.

Hensley returned to the No. 15 truck for a second season in 2026. In the fall, he missed the races at Phoenix and Talladega after being hospitalized with sepsis. His wife stated in a Facebook post that he was expected to fully recover.
