= L. D. Ottinger =

American racing driver (born 1938)

- Born: Lloyd Doth Ottinger; December 30, 1938 (age 87); Newport, Tennessee, U.S.
- Achievements: 1975 Late Model Sportsman Division Champion; 1976 Late Model Sportsman Division Champion

NASCAR Cup Series career
- 10 races run over 4 years
- Best finish: 56th (1973)
- First race: 1966 Smoky Mountain 200 (Maryville)
- Last race: 1984 Holly Farms 400 (North Wilkesboro)
Wins	Top tens	Poles
0	2	0

NASCAR O'Reilly Auto Parts Series career
- 206 races run over 10 years
- Best finish: 4th (1989)
- First race: 1982 Miller Time 300 (Charlotte)
- Last race: 1991 Goody's 300 (Daytona)
- First win: 1986 Busch 200 (Langley)
- Last win: 1990 Budweiser 250 (Bristol)
Wins	Top tens	Poles
3	94	4

NASCAR Grand National East Series career
- 1 race run over 1 year
- First race: 1972 Maryville 200 (Maryville)
Wins	Top tens	Poles
0	1	0
- Statistics up to date as of April 10, 2013.

Lloyd Doth Ottinger (born December 30, 1938) is an American former professional stock car racing driver. He raced occasionally in the NASCAR Winston Cup Series during his career. Driving the Black Diamond Coal No. 2 Chevy, he was a champion in the NASCAR Late Model Sportsman series, predecessor of the Busch Grand National Series.

== Cup Series ==
Ottinger made his major NASCAR debut in 1966, where he drove for Ken Carpenter at Smoky Mountain Raceway. He started 21st in the 29-car field, but finished 28th after a crash on lap 33.

Ottinger's next start came in 1973 at Bristol Motor Speedway. He drove the No. 45 Chevy for James Bryant. Starting from the eleventh position, Ottinger made his way through the field to the second position. His next start was at Talladega a few weeks later. Driving the No. 02 Lonesome Pine Raceway Chevy, Ottinger started 26th and finished tenth. At another race at Charlotte, Ottinger had to settle for a 27th-place finish after his engine expired.

Ottinger made four starts in 1974. However, he did not finish any of the races and the best he could muster was a 25th at both Bristol events.

Ottinger made his last Cup race in 1984, driving for Ron Benfield and the No. 98 Levi Garrett team, replacing the recently released Joe Ruttman for two races. He finished 21st and 22nd at Charlotte and North Wilkesboro Speedway, respectively.

== Busch Series ==
Ottinger made his Busch debut in the series first year of 1982. He started eighth in the No. 84 Kelly Builders Chevy at Charlotte. He was only able to complete 155 laps before he crashed out of the event.

In 1983, Ottinger made start. In his first race, he finished fourth at Rockingham, and also had runs of 24th at Darlington and 27th at Charlotte, retiring from both races with transmission problems.

His runs from previous Cup and Busch starts earned Ottinger a full-time ride in 1984. Driving the No. 10 Schlitz Pontiac, Ottinger qualified for 26 of the 29 races. Despite not making those three races, he made up for it with three poles at Daytona, Charlotte, and IRP. Racewise, he had three top-fives, with his best being a third at Martinsville. Along with seven other top-tens, Ottinger earned a seventh-place finish in points.

Ottinger was able to make all the races in 1985. Despite the fact that he had no poles or no wins, it was still a solid season. He matched his career best finish of third, (Rockingham and Richmond. This led to sixth in the final points.

For 1986, Ottinger got funding from All Pro Auto Parts and moved over to the No. 2 Parker Racing team when CB Gwyn, owner of the No. 10 Pontiac team, sold the team to Parker. It resulted once again in a sixth place final showing, but in his first career win. It came at Langley Speedway, where he started fifth and dominated the race. In addition, Ottinger had twelve top-fives and twenty top-tens. His average start was a 10.5 and finish was 11.9, making it by far his best season.

In 1987, Ottinger fell to ninth in points. This was largely because of nine DNFs. Also, Ottinger could only muster six top-fives and ten top-tens. Despite that, Ottinger finished second four times.

In 1988, Ottinger improved a little, but still finished ninth in the standings. He stayed in the No. 2, but had a new sponsor in Detroit Gasket. Once again, he did not win any races, but did earn his final Busch Series pole at Myrtle Beach. His best finish of the season was second at Martinsville and Louisville Speedway. He had five top-fives and eleven top-tens.

Most important for Ottinger, he was able to return to victory lane in 1989, by virtue of winning the season finale at Martinsville. He had seven top-fives and sixteen top-tens, including a second at Bristol. This improvement made a drastic rise in the standings for Ottinger, as he went to fourth in the final standings.

Ottinger won his final race at Bristol in 1990, in which it was marked by the violent crash of Michael Waltrip. However, the rest of his performance fell. He only managed five top-fives and seven top-tens. Ottinger fell to eighth in the standings. Ottinger closed out his career with a nineteenth place finish at Daytona, in 1991.

Ottinger made a return to the track in 2009 to compete in a legends race at Bristol Motor Speedway. Ottinger finished third in a field of twelve competitors which included Rusty Wallace, Terry Labonte, Harry Gant, and race winner Sterling Marlin.

== Motorsports career results ==
=== NASCAR ===
(key) (Bold – Pole position awarded by qualifying time. Italics – Pole position earned by points standings or practice time. * – Most laps led.)

==== Grand National Series ====
NASCAR Grand National Series results
Year	Team	No.	Make	1	2	3	4	5	6	7	8	9	10	11	12	13	14	15	16	17	18	19	20	21	22	23	24	25	26	27	28	29	30	31	32	33	34	35	36	37	38	39	40	41	42	43	44	45	46	47	48	49	NGNC	Pts	Ref
1966	Ken Carpenter	35	Olds	AUG	RSD	DAY	DAY	DAY	CAR	BRI	ATL	HCY	CLB	GPS	BGS	NWS	MAR	DAR	LGY	MGR	MON	RCH	CLT	DTS	ASH	PIF	SMR	AWS	BLV	GPS	DAY	ODS	BRR	OXF	FON	ISP	BRI	SMR; 28	NSV	ATL	CLB	AWS	BLV	BGS	DAR	HCY	RCH	HBO	MAR	NWS	CLT	CAR	128th	16	

==== Winston Cup Series ====
NASCAR Winston Cup Series results
Year	Team	No.	Make	1	2	3	4	5	6	7	8	9	10	11	12	13	14	15	16	17	18	19	20	21	22	23	24	25	26	27	28	29	30	NWCC	Pts	Ref
1973	James Bryant	45	Chevy	RSD	DAY	RCH	CAR	BRI	ATL	NWS	DAR	MAR	TAL	NSV	CLT	DOV	TWS	RSD	MCH	DAY	BRI; 2	ATL												56th	-	
1973	James Bryant	02	Chevy																				TAL; 10	NSV	DAR	RCH	DOV	NWS	MAR	CLT; 28	CAR			56th	-	
1974	Russell Large Racing	02	Chevy	RSD	DAY; 29	RCH	CAR	BRI; 25	ATL	DAR	NWS	MAR	TAL	NSV	DOV	CLT	RSD	MCH	DAY; 37	BRI; 25	NSV	ATL	POC	TAL	MCH	DAR	RCH	DOV	NWS	MAR	CLT	CAR	ONT	62nd	11.24	
1984	Benfield Racing	98	Chevy	DAY	RCH	CAR	ATL	BRI	NWS	DAR	MAR	TAL	NSV	DOV	CLT	RSD	POC	MCH	DAY	NSV	POC	TAL	MCH	BRI	DAR	RCH	DOV	MAR	CLT; 21	NWS; 22	CAR	ATL	RSD	77th	-	

===== Daytona 500 =====
Year	Team	Manufacturer	Start	Finish
1974	Russell Large Racing	Chevrolet	39	29

==== Busch Series ====
NASCAR Busch Series results
Year	Team	No.	Make	1	2	3	4	5	6	7	8	9	10	11	12	13	14	15	16	17	18	19	20	21	22	23	24	25	26	27	28	29	30	31	32	33	34	35	NBSC	Pts	Ref
1982	Fred Kelly	34	Pontiac	DAY	RCH	BRI	MAR	DAR	HCY	SBO	CRW	RCH	LGY	DOV	HCY	CLT	ASH	HCY	SBO	CAR	CRW	SBO	HCY	LGY	IRP	BRI	HCY	RCH	MAR	CLT; 25	HCY	MAR							157th	88	
1983	Fred Kelly	34	Pontiac	DAY	RCH	CAR; 4	HCY	MAR	NWS	SBO	GPS	LGY	DOV	BRI	CLT	SBO	HCY	ROU	SBO	ROU	CRW	ROU	SBO	HCY	LGY	IRP	GPS	BRI	HCY										60th	333	
1983	Gwyn Racing	26	Olds																											DAR; 24	RCH	NWS	SBO	MAR	ROU				60th	333	
1983	Gwyn Racing	26	Pontiac																																	CLT; 27	HCY	MAR	60th	333	
1984	Gwyn Racing	10	Pontiac	**DAY**; 8	RCH	CAR; 4			DAR; 26						**CLT**; 32					ROU; 8	HCY; 19	**IRP**; 23	LGY	SBO; 8	BRI; 26		RCH; 25	NWS; 7	CLT; 33	HCY; 8		MAR; 3							7th	3069	
1984	Gwyn Racing	10	Olds				HCY; 21	MAR; 13		ROU; 9	NSV; 9	LGY; 15	MLW; 19	DOV; 14		SBO; 26	HCY; 12	ROU; 13	SBO							DAR; 4					CAR; 21								7th	3069	
1985	Gwyn Racing	10	Pontiac	DAY; 8		HCY; 9	BRI; 19	MAR; 15	DAR; 3	SBO; 6	LGY; 13	DOV; 6	CLT; 3	SBO; 15	HCY; 5	ROU; 8	IRP; 8	SBO; 13	LGY; 13	HCY; 10	MLW; 6	BRI; 8		RCH; 3	NWS; 7	ROU; 5	CLT; 37	HCY; 10	CAR; 3	MAR; 7									6th	3732	
1985	Gwyn Racing	10	Olds		CAR; 6																		DAR; 11																6th	3732	
1986	Parker Racing	2	Pontiac	DAY; 35		HCY; 3	MAR; 4	BRI; 15		SBO; 10	LGY; 7	JFC; 5	DOV; 8	CLT; 32		HCY; 6	ROU; 7	IRP; 4	SBO; 6	RAL; 5	OXF; 28	SBO; 24	HCY; 25	LGY; 1*	ROU; 18	BRI; 27		RCH; 8		MAR; 3	ROU; 17			MAR; 3					6th	4094	
1986	Parker Racing	2	Olds		CAR; 10				DAR; 16																		DAR; 5		DOV; 4										6th	4094	
1986	Parker Racing	10	Pontiac												SBO; 4																								6th	4094	
1986	Parker Racing	2	Buick																													CLT; 4	CAR; 24						6th	4094	
1987	Parker Racing	2	Buick	DAY; 34	HCY; 4	MAR; 11	DAR; 14	BRI; 22	LGY; 22	SBO; 15	CLT; 31	DOV; 26	IRP; 25	ROU; 2	JFC; 16	OXF; 13	SBO; 22	HCY; 15	RAL; 2	LGY; 7	ROU; 25	BRI; 30	JFC; 2	DAR; 22	RCH; 2	DOV; 3	MAR; 7	CLT; 6	CAR; 9	MAR; 22									9th	3261	
1988	Parker Racing	2	Buick	DAY; 22	HCY; 14	CAR; 30	MAR; 2*	DAR; 29	BRI; 17	LNG; 14	NZH; 20	SBO; 6	NSV; 10	CLT; 15	DOV; 11	ROU; 9	LAN; 4	LVL; 2*	**MYB**; 21	OXF; 24	SBO; 14	HCY; 23	LNG; 13	IRP; 13	ROU; 5	BRI; 9	DAR; 21	RCH; 8	DOV; 8	MAR; 23	CLT; 24	CAR; 14	MAR; 4						9th	3670	
1989	Parker Racing	2	Pontiac	DAY; 20	CAR; 6	MAR; 17	HCY; 13	DAR; 11	BRI; 7	NZH; 14	SBO; 12	LAN; 16	NSV; 10	CLT; 14	DOV; 13	ROU; 21	LVL; 4	VOL; 4	MYB; 22	SBO; 4	HCY; 8	DUB; 5	IRP; 7	ROU; 6	BRI; 2	DAR; 8	RCH; 9	DOV; 8	MAR; 5*	CLT; 23	CAR; 15	MAR; 1							4th	3916	
1990	Parker Racing	2	Olds	DAY; 10		CAR; 26	MAR; 27	HCY; 12	DAR; 4	BRI; 1*	LAN; 22	SBO; 19	NZH; 16	HCY; 11	CLT; 11	DOV; 28	ROU; 24	VOL; 23	MYB; 2	OXF; 11	NHA; 20	SBO; 18	DUB; 22	IRP; 17	ROU; 2	BRI; 12	DAR; 15	RCH; 18	DOV; 18	MAR; 5	CLT; 18	NHA; 13	CAR; 21	MAR; 9					8th	3693	
1990	Parker Racing	2	Pontiac		RCH; 20																																		8th	3693	
1991	Beard Motorsports	00	Olds	DAY; 19	RCH	CAR	MAR	VOL	HCY	DAR	BRI	LAN	SBO	NZH	CLT	DOV	ROU	HCY	MYB	GLN	OXF	NHA	SBO	DUB	IRP	ROU	BRI	DAR	RCH	DOV	CLT	NHA	CAR	MAR					89th	106	

=== ARCA Talladega SuperCar Series ===
(key) (Bold – Pole position awarded by qualifying time. Italics – Pole position earned by points standings or practice time. * – Most laps led.)

ARCA Talladega SuperCar Series results
Year	Team	No.	Make	1	2	3	4	5	6	7	8	9	10	11	12	13	14	ATCSC	Pts	Ref
1985	Gwyn Racing	10	Pontiac	ATL	DAY	ATL	TAL	ATL	SSP	IRP; 8	CSP	FRS	IRP	OEF	ISF	DSF	TOL	116th	-	
