= Jeff McClure =

American racing driver, team owner, and crew chief

- Born: Jeffrey McClure; January 22, 1967 (age 59); Harrisburg, North Carolina, U.S.

NASCAR Cup Series career
- 1 race run over 1 year
- Best finish: 79th (1992)
- First race: 1992 Champion Spark Plug 400 (Michigan)
Wins	Top tens	Poles
0	0	0

NASCAR O'Reilly Auto Parts Series career
- 20 races run over 5 years
- Best finish: 52nd (1997)
- First race: 1988 Pennsylvania 300 (Nazareth)
- Last race: 1997 Sears Auto Center 250 (Milwaukee)
Wins	Top tens	Poles
0	0	0

NASCAR FedEx Freight Truck Series career
- 3 races run over 1 year
- Best finish: 62nd (2000)
- First race: 2000 Line-X 225 (Portland)
- Last race: 2000 Chevy Silverado 200 (Nazareth)
Wins	Top tens	Poles
0	0	0
- Statistics up to date as of July 26, 2020.

Jeffrey McClure (born January 22, 1967) is an American former stock car racing driver, crew chief and team owner. He currently works for Nitro Motorsports as the crew chief of their No. 90 Toyota Camry in the ARCA Menards Series. Prior to that, he was a team owner in the series, co-owning Ferrier McClure Racing with driver John Ferrier from 2021 to 2024. As a driver, McClure raced for multiple years in all three major NASCAR series as well as what is now the ARCA Menards Series.

== Racing career ==
=== Driving career ===
McClure made his Busch debut in 1988, running his own No. 83 Oldsmobile in four races. His series debut came at Nazareth, falling out due to an engine failure. McClure's finishes improved drastically every race and by the race at Langley, McClure earned his best finish of the year in eighteenth. Also, his best start of the year ended up twelfth at Myrtle Beach.

McClure made two starts in 1989. He finished nineteenth at Charlotte and 25th at Rockingham.

McClure had one start in 1990. He started 41st at Daytona, but was caught up in a crash. However, McClure still managed 22nd and the season opener at Daytona would prove to be his only 1990 start.

McClure only made one career start in NASCAR's Winston Cup Series, which came in 1992 at the 1992 running of the Champion Spark Plug 400. He qualified the Jim Rosenblum Racing 39th at Michigan. He did finish the race, however, it was only a 31st place finish.

McClure returned after a six-year hiatus in 1996, running three races for Moy Racing. After finishing 26th and 31st, McClure finished sixteenth at the Milwaukee Mile. It would prove to be his best career finish in the series.

McClure was then invited back for ten races in 1997 for Moy. McClure's team struggled in his starts. His best start was 32nd and his best finish was 23rd at Las Vegas. The poor results can be explained by his five DNFs in ten starts.

McClure reappeared on the NASCAR scene in 2000, running three CTS races for Albernaz Racing. He started 29th and finished 26th at Portland. His next start at Texas proved to be his best. He was 21st in that race. At Nazareth, McClure earned his best career start of 28th and looked to be in good shape for bettering his previous starts. However, a late engine failure ended his CTS career in 23rd.

McClure's start at Nazareth in 2000 ended up being his last NASCAR race as a driver.

=== Crew chiefing career ===
In 2008, McClure worked for Fast Track Racing in the ARCA Series, crew chiefing the No. 11 car full time for Bryan Silas. In addition, he crew chiefed FTR's part-time Truck Series team, the No. 48, when Silas and Hermie Sadler made a combined three starts in that truck.

Cal Boprey replaced McClure as the crew chief of the No. 11 of Silas for 2009, and McClure moved to the No. 15 Venturini Motorsports Chevy/Toyota, a part-time car, to crew chief drivers Ryan Fischer, Alex Yontz, Dakoda Armstrong, Justin Marks, Justin Lloyd, Jesse Smith, Josh Richards, and Steve Arpin. He left after one year to crew chief Brazilian rookie Miguel Paludo's No. 77 car for Hattori Racing Enterprises in the K&N East Series.

McClure was crew chief for rookie T. J. Bell's partial Cup Series schedule in 2011 in the No. 50 Toyota/Chevy for LTD Powersports (a team owned by Joe Falk, before he owned Circle Sport). The team shut down after just one year, and McClure went back to ARCA crew chiefing for Andy Belmont Racing's No. 1 Ford and driver Mikey Kile in 2012.

McClure rejoined Venturini Motorsports' ARCA Racing Series team in 2013. He had one win as crew chief for Todd Gilliland in 2015 and two wins with Christopher Bell in 2016. For 2017, he was the crew chief for the No. 15 driven by Christian Eckes and other drivers.

McClure eventually left Venturini (again) and joined Empire Racing as the crew chief for the No. 46 car of Thad Moffitt. The team has an alliance with Richard Petty Motorsports. In 2018, he also served as crew chief for dirt racer Ryan Unzicker at Springfield and DuQuoin (when he needed a crew chief and Moffitt was not running those races).

For the 2020 season, McClure worked for two teams, serving as the crew chief for John Ferrier's family team in ARCA's season-opening race at Daytona, and also for Connor Okrzesik's part-time ARCA Menards Series East team.

From 2021 to 2024, McClure co-owned an ARCA team with driver John Ferrier, Ferrier McClure Racing. They fielded the No. 44 car part-time.

In 2025, McClure did not field his own ARCA team and instead joined Nitro Motorsports as a crew chief of their No. 70 car. In 2026, he moved over to the team's new No. 90 car.

== Motorsports career results ==
=== NASCAR ===
(key) (Bold – Pole position awarded by qualifying time. Italics – Pole position earned by points standings or practice time. * – Most laps led.)

==== Winston Cup Series ====
NASCAR Winston Cup Series results
Year	Team	No.	Make	1	2	3	4	5	6	7	8	9	10	11	12	13	14	15	16	17	18	19	20	21	22	23	24	25	26	27	28	29	30	NWCC	Pts	Ref
1992	Linro Motorsports	27	Chevy	DAY	CAR	RCH	ATL	DAR	BRI	NWS	MAR	TAL	CLT	DOV	SON	POC	MCH	DAY	POC	TAL	GLN	MCH; 31	BRI	DAR	RCH	DOV	MAR	NWS	CLT	CAR	PHO	ATL		79th	70	
1993	McClure Racing	29	Chevy	DAY	CAR	RCH	ATL	DAR	BRI	NWS	MAR	TAL	SON	CLT	DOV	POC	MCH	DAY	NHA	POC	TAL	GLN	MCH	BRI	DAR; DNQ	RCH	DOV	MAR	NWS					N/A	0	
1993	McClure Racing	58	Chevy																											CLT; DNQ	CAR	PHO	ATL	N/A	0	

==== Busch Series ====
NASCAR Busch Series results
Year	Team	No.	Make	1	2	3	4	5	6	7	8	9	10	11	12	13	14	15	16	17	18	19	20	21	22	23	24	25	26	27	28	29	30	31	32	NBSC	Pts	Ref
1988	McClure Racing	83	Olds	DAY	HCY	CAR	MAR	DAR	BRI	LNG	NZH; 35	SBO	NSV	CLT	DOV	ROU	LAN	LVL	MYB; 29	OXF	SBO; 21	HCY	LNG; 18	IRP	ROU	BRI	DAR	RCH	DOV	MAR	CLT	CAR	MAR			73rd	134	
1989	McClure Racing	83	Pontiac	DAY	CAR	MAR	HCY	DAR	BRI	NZH	SBO	LAN	NSV	CLT; DNQ	DOV	ROU	LVL	VOL	MYB	SBO	HCY	DUB	IRP	ROU	BRI	DAR	RCH	DOV	MAR	CLT; 19	CAR; 25	MAR				71st	194	
1990	McClure Racing	83	Chevy	DAY; 22	RCH	CAR	MAR	HCY	DAR	BRI	LAN	SBO	NZH	HCY	CLT; DNQ	DOV	ROU	VOL	MYB	OXF	NHA	SBO	DUB	IRP	ROU	BRI	DAR	RCH	DOV	MAR	CLT	NHA	CAR	MAR		88th	97	
1991	McClure Racing	83	Chevy	DAY	RCH	CAR	MAR	VOL	HCY	DAR	BRI	LAN	SBO	NZH	CLT	DOV	ROU	HCY	MYB	GLN	OXF	NHA	SBO	DUB	IRP	ROU	BRI	DAR	RCH	DOV	CLT; DNQ	NHA	CAR	MAR		N/A	0	
1996	CPR Motorsports	36	Ford	DAY	CAR; DNQ	RCH	ATL	NSV	DAR	BRI	HCY																									59th	270	
1996	Bobby Jones Racing	50	Ford									NZH; 26	CLT; DNQ	DOV	SBO	MYB; 31	GLN	MLW; 16	NHA	TAL	IRP	MCH	BRI	DAR	RCH	DOV	CLT	CAR	HOM							59th	270	
1997	John Walsh	77	Ford	DAY; DNQ	CAR; 30	RCH; DNQ	ATL; DNQ	LVS; 23	DAR; DNQ	HCY; DNQ	TEX; 42	BRI; 37	NSV; 29	TAL; 30	NHA; 28	NZH; 24	CLT; DNQ	DOV; 36	SBO; DNQ	GLN; 36	MLW; 39	MYB	GTY	IRP	MCH	BRI	DAR	RCH	DOV	CLT	CAL	CAR	HOM			52nd	603	
1999	Key Motorsports	13	Ford	DAY; DNQ	CAR	LVS	ATL	DAR	TEX	NSV	BRI	TAL	CAL	NHA	RCH	NZH	CLT	DOV	SBO	GLN	MLW	MYB	PPR	GTY	IRP	MCH	BRI	DAR	RCH	DOV	CLT	CAR	MEM	PHO	HOM	N/A	0	

==== Craftsman Truck Series ====
NASCAR Craftsman Truck Series results
Year	Team	No.	Make	1	2	3	4	5	6	7	8	9	10	11	12	13	14	15	16	17	18	19	20	21	22	23	24	NCTC	Pts	Ref
2000	CJ Racing	21	Ford	DAY	HOM	PHO	MMR	MAR	PIR; 26	GTY	MEM	PPR	EVG															62nd	279	
2000	CJ Racing	27	Ford											TEX; 21	KEN	GLN	MLW	NHA	NZH; 23	MCH	IRP	NSV	CIC	RCH	DOV	TEX	CAL	62nd	279	

=== ARCA Bondo/Mar-Hyde Series ===
(key) (Bold – Pole position awarded by qualifying time. Italics – Pole position earned by points standings or practice time. * – Most laps led.)

ARCA Bondo/Mar-Hyde Series results
Year	Team	No.	Make	1	2	3	4	5	6	7	8	9	10	11	12	13	14	15	16	17	18	19	20	21	22	23	24	25	ABMHSC	Pts	Ref
1991	Bob Schacht Motorsports	54	Buick	DAY	ATL	KIL	TAL	TOL	FRS	POC	MCH	KIL	FRS	DEL	POC	TAL	HPT	MCH	ISF	TOL	DSF	TWS	ATL; 16								
1992	James Nelson	82	Olds	DAY; 39	FIF	TWS																							25th	1350	
1992	James Nelson	89	Chevy				TAL; 5	TOL	KIL	POC; 2						POC; 3	HPT	FRS	ISF	TOL	DSF	TWS; 42	SLM	ATL; 9					25th	1350	
1992	James Nelson	89	Pontiac								MCH; 26	FRS	KIL	NSH	DEL														25th	1350	
1993	James Nelson	89	Chevy	DAY; 26								POC; 31	MCH	FRS	POC	KIL	ISF	DSF	TOL	SLM	WIN	ATL									
1993	James Nelson	89	Pontiac				TAL; 40	KIL	CMS	FRS	TOL																				
1993	Shirley Racing	2	Chevy		FIF; 26	TWS																									
1994	McClure Racing	89	Chevy	DAY; 4	TAL; 33	FIF; 17	LVL; 3	KIL; 16	TOL; 22	FRS; 12	MCH; 5	DMS; 7	POC; 12	POC; 11	KIL; 10	FRS; 9	INF; 13	I70; 6	ISF; 29	DSF; 29	TOL; 8		WIN; 26	ATL; 6					5th	4640	
1994	McClure Racing	51	Chevy																			SLM; 31							5th	4640	
1995	McClure Racing	89	Chevy	DAY; 28	ATL; 35	TAL; 27	FIF; 15	KIL		MCH; 35	I80	MCS; DNS	FRS	POC; 22							DSF; 20	SLM	WIN	ATL					29th	1205	
1995	McClure Racing	89	Pontiac						FRS; 12																				29th	1205	
1995	AAG Racing	3	Chevy												POC; 37	KIL	FRS	SBS	LVL	ISF									29th	1205	
1996	Bobby Jones Racing	50	Ford	DAY; 6	ATL; 10	SLM																									
1996	Bobby Jones Racing	50	Chevy				TAL; 5	FIF	LVL	CLT	CLT	KIL	FRS	POC	MCH	FRS	TOL	POC	MCH	INF	SBS	ISF	DSF	KIL	SLM	WIN	CLT	ATL			
2000	Harvill Racing	89	Ford	DAY	SLM	AND	CLT; DNQ	KIL	FRS	MCH	POC	TOL	KEN	BLN	POC	WIN	ISF	KEN	DSF	SLM	CLT	TAL	ATL						N/A	0	
