= Mike Swaim =

American racing driver (born 1952)

- Born: June 7, 1952 (age 74); High Point, North Carolina, U.S.

NASCAR O'Reilly Auto Parts Series career
- 36 races run over 4 years
- Best finish: 14th (1988)
- First race: 1985 Winn-Dixie 300 (Charlotte)
- Last race: 1991 AC-Delco 200 (Rockingham)
Wins	Top tens	Poles
0	3	1
- Statistics up to date as of December 22, 2024.

Mike Swaim (born June 7, 1952) is an American former professional stock car racing driver who has competed in the NASCAR Busch Series and the NASCAR Goody's Dash Series. He is a former champion of the Dash Series, having won the championship in 1984 and 1985.

Swaim is the father of former racing driver Mike Swaim Jr., who also competed in NASCAR.

== Motorsports results ==
=== NASCAR ===
(key) (Bold - Pole position awarded by qualifying time. Italics - Pole position earned by points standings or practice time. * – Most laps led.)

==== Busch Series ====
NASCAR Busch Series results
Year	Team	No.	Make	1	2	3	4	5	6	7	8	9	10	11	12	13	14	15	16	17	18	19	20	21	22	23	24	25	26	27	28	29	30	31	NBSC	Pts	Ref
1985	Owens Racing	89	Pontiac	DAY	CAR	HCY	BRI	MAR	DAR	SBO	LGY	DOV	CLT; 25	SBO	HCY	ROU	IRP	SBO	LGY	HCY	MLW	BRI													59th	203	
1985	Owens Racing	89	Olds																				DAR; 16	RCH	NWS	ROU	CLT	HCY	CAR	MAR					59th	203	
1986	Owens Racing	89	Olds	DAY; DNQ	CAR	HCY	MAR	BRI	DAR; 12	SBO	LGY	JFC	DOV	CLT; 20	SBO	HCY	ROU	IRP	SBO	RAL	OXF	SBO	HCY	LGY	ROU	BRI									60th	194	
1986	Owens Racing	89	Pontiac																								DAR; 24	RCH	DOV	MAR	ROU	CLT	CAR	MAR	60th	194	
1988	HVP Motorsports	63	Chevy	**DAY**; 13		CAR; 20	MAR; 17	DAR; 35	BRI; 27	LNG; 20	NZH; 29	SBO; 18	NSV; 12	CLT; 26		ROU; 20	LAN; 10	LVL; 10	MYB; 10	OXF; 31	SBO; 24	HCY; 20	LNG; 14	IRP; 15	ROU; 19	BRI; 21	DAR; 26	RCH; 19	DOV; 17	MAR; 14	CLT; 41	CAR; 23	MAR		14th	2918	
1988	N/A	1	Buick		HCY; 18																														14th	2918	
1988	Southern Maryland Motorsports	58	Olds												DOV; 35																				14th	2918	
1991	Thackston Racing	24	Ford	DAY	RCH	CAR	MAR	VOL	HCY	DAR; 22	BRI	LAN	SBO	NZH	CLT	DOV	ROU	HCY	MYB	GLN	OXF	NHA	SBO	DUB	IRP	ROU	BRI	DAR	RCH	DOV	CLT	NHA	CAR; 39	MAR	82nd	143	

Sporting positions
Preceded by Michael Waltrip	NASCAR Darlington Dash Series Champion; 1984	Succeeded by Mike Swaim
Preceded by Mike Swaim	NASCAR Daytona Dash Series Champion; 1985	Succeeded by Hut Stricklin
