= 1988 NASCAR Busch Series =

American motorsport season

Seasons
- ← 1987 1989 →

The 1988 NASCAR Busch Series began February 13, 1988 and ended October 30, 1988. Tommy Ellis of J&J Racing won the championship.

== Schedule ==
Schedule as follows:

No.	Race title	Track	Date
1	Goody's 300	Daytona International Speedway, Daytona Beach	February 13
2	Mountain Dew 400	Hickory Speedway, Hickory	February 28
3	Goodwrench 200	North Carolina Motor Speedway, Rockingham	March 5
4	Miller Classic	Martinsville Speedway, Martinsville	March 13
5	Country Squire 200	Darlington Raceway, Darlington	March 26
6	Budweiser 200	Bristol International Speedway, Bristol	April 9
7	Hampton 200	Langley Speedway, Hampton	April 30
8	Pennsylvania 300	Nazareth Speedway, Nazareth	May 7
9	Busch 200	South Boston Speedway, South Boston	May 14
10	CarQuest 200	Nashville Speedway USA, Nashville	May 21
11	Winn-Dixie 300	Charlotte Motor Speedway, Concord	May 28
12	Budweiser 200	Dover International Speedway, Dover	June 4
13	Roses Stores 150	Orange County Speedway, Rougemont	June 11
14	Big Star/Coca-Cola 200	Lanier Speedway, Gainesville	June 19
15	Granger Select 200	Louisville Motor Speedway, Louisville	June 25
16	Myrtle Beach 200	Myrtle Beach Speedway, Myrtle Beach	July 2
17	Oxford 250	Oxford Plains Speedway, Oxford	July 10
18	Coors 200	South Boston Speedway, South Boston	July 16
19	Pepsi 200	Hickory Speedway, Hickory	July 23
20	Busch 200	Langley Speedway, Hampton	July 30
21	Kroger 200	Indianapolis Raceway Park, Clermont	August 6
22	Poole Equipment 150	Orange County Speedway, Rougemont	August 13
23	Tri-City Pontiac 200	Bristol International Speedway, Bristol	August 26
24	Gatorade 200	Darlington Raceway, Darlington	September 3
25	Commonwealth 200	Richmond International Raceway, Richmond	September 10
26	Grand National 200	Dover International Speedway, Dover	September 17
27	Advance Auto 150	Martinsville Speedway, Martinsville	September 24
28	All Pro 300	Charlotte Motor Speedway, Concord	October 8
29	AC-Delco 200	North Carolina Motor Speedway, Rockingham	October 22
30	Winston Classic	Martinsville Speedway, Martinsville	October 30

== Races ==
=== Goody's 300 powered by Sprite ===
The Goody's 300 powered by Sprite was held February 13 at Daytona International Speedway. Mike Swaim won the pole.

Top Ten Results

1. #12-Bobby Allison
2. #15-Geoff Bodine
3. #17-Darrell Waltrip
4. #06-Mark Martin
5. #32-Dale Jarrett
6. #28-Davey Allison
7. #84-Mike Alexander
8. #7-Harry Gant
9. #25-Rob Moroso
10. #22-Rick Mast

=== Mountain Dew 400 ===
The Mountain Dew 400 was held February 28 at Hickory Motor Speedway. Dale Jarrett won the pole.

Top Ten Results

1. #84-Mike Alexander
2. #6-Tommy Houston
3. #11-Jack Ingram
4. #99-Tommy Ellis
5. #32-Dale Jarrett
6. #21-Larry Pearson
7. #5-Jimmy Hensley
8. #8-Dale Earnhardt
9. #00-Larry Pollard
10. #25-Rob Moroso

=== Goodwrench 200 ===
The Goodwrench 200 was held March 5 at North Carolina Motor Speedway. Dale Earnhardt won the pole.

Top Ten Results

1. #06-Mark Martin
2. #84-Mike Alexander
3. #32-Dale Jarrett
4. #81-Bobby Hillin Jr.
5. #7-Harry Gant
6. #99-Tommy Ellis
7. #22-Rick Mast
8. #97-Morgan Shepherd
9. #00-Larry Pollard
10. #5-Jimmy Hensley

=== Miller Classic ===
The Miller Classic was held March 13 at Martinsville Speedway. Larry Pearson won the pole.

Top Ten Results

1. #5-Jimmy Hensley
2. #2-L. D. Ottinger
3. #25-Rob Moroso
4. #84-Mike Alexander
5. #11-Jack Ingram
6. #41-Max Prestwood
7. #22-Rick Mast
8. #34-Jimmy Spencer
9. #02-Kenny Burks
10. #00-Larry Pollard

=== Country Squire 200 ===
The Country Squire 200 was held March 26 at Darlington Raceway. Geoff Bodine won the pole.

Top Ten Results

1. #15-Geoff Bodine
2. #7-Harry Gant
3. #32-Dale Jarrett
4. #8-Dale Earnhardt
5. #81-Bobby Hillin Jr.
6. #25-Rob Moroso
7. #21-Larry Pearson
8. #72-Rusty Wallace
9. #06-Mark Martin
10. #17-Darrell Waltrip

=== Budweiser 200 ===
The Budweiser 200 was held April 9 at Bristol Motor Speedway. Larry Pearson won the pole.

Top Ten Results

1. #8-Dale Earnhardt
2. #99-Tommy Ellis
3. #11-Jack Ingram
4. #25-Rob Moroso
5. #34-Jimmy Spencer
6. #90-Ed Berrier
7. #6-Tommy Houston
8. #7-Harry Gant
9. #22-Rick Mast
10. #75-Brad Teague

=== Hampton 200 ===
The Hampton 200 was held April 30 at Langley Speedway. Tommy Ellis won the pole.

Top Ten Results

1. #99-Tommy Ellis
2. #21-Larry Pearson
3. #11-Jack Ingram
4. #6-Tommy Houston
5. #00-Larry Pollard
6. #42-Elton Sawyer
7. #07-Tommy Sigmon
8. #34-Jimmy Spencer
9. #84-Mike Alexander
10. #14-Ronnie Silver

=== Pennsylvania 300 ===
The Pennsylvania 300 was held May 7 at Nazareth Speedway. Mike Alexander won the pole.

Top Ten Results

1. #22-Rick Mast
2. #25-Rob Moroso
3. #12-Bobby Allison
4. #11-Jack Ingram
5. #5-Jimmy Hensley
6. #8-Dale Earnhardt
7. #00-Larry Pollard
8. #34-Jimmy Spencer
9. #39-Steve Grissom
10. #99-Tommy Ellis

=== Busch 200 ===
The Busch 200 was held May 14 at South Boston Speedway. Tommy Ellis won the pole.

Top Ten Results

1. #21-Larry Pearson
2. #84-Mike Alexander
3. #99-Tommy Ellis
4. #14-Ronnie Silver
5. #6-Tommy Houston
6. #2-L. D. Ottinger
7. #25-Rob Moroso
8. #07-Tommy Sigmon
9. #24-Joe Thurman
10. #22-Rick Mast

=== CarQuest 200 ===
The CarQuest 200 was held May 21 at Nashville Speedway USA. Larry Pearson won the pole.

Top Ten Results

1. #17-Darrell Waltrip
2. #11-Jack Ingram
3. #34-Jimmy Spencer
4. #21-Larry Pearson
5. #90-Ed Berrier
6. #5-Jimmy Hensley
7. #6-Tommy Houston
8. #14-Ronnie Silver
9. #84-Mike Alexander
10. #2-L. D. Ottinger

=== Winn-Dixie 300 ===
The Winn-Dixie 300 was held May 28 at Charlotte Motor Speedway. Geoff Bodine won the pole.

Top Ten Results

1. #32-Dale Jarrett
2. #81-Bobby Hillin Jr.
3. #12-Bobby Allison
4. #25-Rob Moroso
5. #8-Dale Earnhardt
6. #7-Harry Gant
7. #9-Bill Elliott
8. #97-Morgan Shepherd
9. #84-Mike Alexander
10. #90-Ed Berrier

=== Budweiser 200 ===
The Budweiser 200 was held June 4 at Dover International Speedway. Mike Alexander won the pole.

Top Ten Results

1. #81-Bobby Hillin Jr.
2. #21-Larry Pearson
3. #52-Ken Schrader
4. #90-Ed Berrier
5. #75-Brad Teague
6. #99-Tommy Ellis
7. #4-Kelly Moore
8. #39-Steve Grissom
9. #96-Tom Peck
10. #84-Mike Alexander
- On lap 195; Larry Pollard, serving as a substitute driver for his father-in-law Harry Gant after Gant suffered a broken leg following a crash at the 1988 Coca-Cola 600, suffered a serious crash that left him with a basilar skull fracture; which he ended up managing to survive.

=== Roses Stores 150 ===
The Roses Stores 150 was held June 11 at Orange County Speedway. Tommy Houston won the pole.

Top Ten Results

1. #6-Tommy Houston
2. #21-Larry Pearson
3. #34-Jimmy Spencer
4. #25-Rob Moroso
5. #84-Mike Alexander
6. #99-Tommy Ellis
7. #5-Jimmy Hensley
8. #84-Ronnie Silver
9. #2-L. D. Ottinger
10. #47-Billy Standridge

=== Big Star/Coca-Cola 200 ===
The Big Star/Coca-Cola 200 was held June 19 at Lanier Speedway. Larry Pearson won the pole.

Top Ten Results

1. #6-Tommy Houston
2. #5-Jimmy Hensley
3. #21-Larry Pearson
4. #2-L. D. Ottinger
5. #84-Mike Alexander
6. #02-Kenny Burks
7. #47-Billy Standridge
8. #34-Jimmy Spencer
9. #00-Ronnie Silver
10. #63-Mike Swaim

=== Granger Select 200 ===
The Granger Select 200 was held June 25 at Louisville Motor Speedway. Bobby Dotter won the pole.

Top Ten Results

1. #99-Tommy Ellis
2. #2-L. D. Ottinger
3. #5-Jimmy Hensley
4. #84-Mike Alexander
5. #34-Jimmy Spencer
6. #90-Ed Berrier
7. #14-Ronnie Silver
8. #39-Steve Grissom
9. #07-Tommy Sigmon
10. #63-Mike Swaim

=== Myrtle Beach 200 ===
The Myrtle Beach 200 was held July 2 at Myrtle Beach Speedway. L. D. Ottinger won the pole.

Top Ten Results

1. #25-Rob Moroso
2. #21-Larry Pearson
3. #6-Tommy Houston
4. #41-Max Prestwood
5. #11-Jack Ingram
6. #22-Rick Mast
7. #42-Elton Sawyer
8. #75-Brad Teague
9. #81-Bobby Hillin Jr.
10. #63-Mike Swaim

=== Oxford 250 ===
The Oxford 250 was held July 10 at Oxford Plains Speedway. Larry Pearson won the pole.

Top Ten Results

1. #0-Dick McCabe
2. #47-Kelly Moore
3. #66-Randy LaJoie
4. #71-Bobby Dragon
5. #88-Larry Caron
6. #26-Darren Bernier
7. #99-Tommy Ellis
8. #11-Jack Ingram
9. #33-Joey Kourafas
10. #7-Chuck Bown

=== Coors 200 ===
The Coors 200 was held July 16 at South Boston Speedway. Rob Moroso won the pole.

Top Ten Results

1. #21-Larry Pearson
2. #99-Tommy Ellis
3. #6-Tommy Houston
4. #11-Jack Ingram
5. #22-Rick Mast
6. #56-Ronald Cooper
7. #90-Ed Berrier
8. #42-Elton Sawyer
9. #07-Tommy Sigmon
10. #00-Ronnie Silver

=== Pepsi 200 ===
The Pepsi 200 was held July 23 at Hickory Motor Speedway. Rob Moroso won the pole.

Top Ten Results

1. #6-Tommy Houston
2. #5-Jimmy Hensley
3. #99-Tommy Ellis
4. #11-Jack Ingram
5. #21-Larry Pearson
6. #79-Bobby Dotter
7. #00-Ronnie Silver
8. #22-Rick Mast
9. #25-Rob Moroso
10. #07-Tommy Sigmon

=== Busch 200 ===
The Busch 200 was held July 30 at Langley Speedway. Tommy Ellis won the pole.

Top Ten Results

1. #99-Tommy Ellis
2. #11-Jack Ingram
3. #5-Jimmy Hensley
4. #6-Tommy Houston
5. #22-Rick Mast
6. #25-Rob Moroso
7. #21-Larry Pearson
8. #84-Mike Alexander
9. #34-Jimmy Spencer
10. #90-Ed Berrier

=== Kroger 200 ===
The Kroger 200 was held August 6 at Indianapolis Raceway Park. Kelly Moore won the pole.

Top Ten Results

1. #97-Morgan Shepherd
2. #6-Tommy Houston
3. #99-Tommy Ellis
4. #21-Larry Pearson
5. #17-Darrell Waltrip
6. #79-Bobby Dotter
7. #06-Mark Martin
8. #30-Kyle Petty
9. #91-Tom Harrington
10. #4-Kelly Moore

=== Poole Equipment 150 ===
The Poole Equipment 150 was held August 13 at Orange County Speedway. Larry Pearson won the pole.

Top Ten Results

1. #22-Rick Mast
2. #84-Mike Alexander
3. #25-Rob Moroso
4. #90-Ed Berrier
5. #2-L. D. Ottinger
6. #6-Tommy Houston
7. #99-Tommy Ellis
8. #56-Ronald Cooper
9. #42-Elton Sawyer
10. #02-Kenny Burks

=== Tri-City Pontiac 200 ===
The Tri-City Pontiac 200 was held August 26 at Bristol International Speedway. Tommy Ellis won the pole.

Top Ten Results

1. #21-Larry Pearson
2. #84-Mike Alexander
3. #8-Dale Earnhardt
4. #7-Harry Gant
5. #5-Jimmy Hensley
6. #34-Jimmy Spencer
7. #28-Davey Allison
8. #6-Tommy Houston
9. #2-L. D. Ottinger
10. #06-Mark Martin

=== Gatorade 200 ===
The Gatorade 200 was held September 3 at Darlington Raceway. Geoff Bodine won the pole.

Top Ten Results

1. #7-Harry Gant
2. #15-Geoff Bodine
3. #17-Michael Waltrip
4. #28-Davey Allison
5. #97-Morgan Shepherd
6. #34-Jimmy Spencer
7. #84-Mike Alexander
8. #25-Rob Moroso
9. #66-Rusty Wallace
10. #75-Brad Teague

=== Commonwealth 200 ===
The Commonwealth 200 was held September 10 at Richmond International Raceway. Harry Gant won the pole.

Top Ten Results

1. #7-Harry Gant
2. #21-Larry Pearson
3. #25-Rob Moroso
4. #99-Tommy Ellis
5. #39-Steve Grissom
6. #5-Jimmy Hensley
7. #07-Tommy Sigmon
8. #2-L. D. Ottinger
9. #06-Mark Martin
10. #90-Ed Berrier

NOTE: This was the first race held at the newly expanded Richmond International Raceway, expanded from .542 mile to the new .750 mile distance in February.

=== Grand National 200 ===
The Grand National 200 was held September 17 at Dover International Speedway. Harry Gant won the pole.

Top Ten Results

1. #17-Michael Waltrip
2. #99-Tommy Ellis
3. #97-Morgan Shepherd
4. #81-Bobby Hillin Jr.
5. #56-Ronald Cooper
6. #34-Jimmy Spencer
7. #7-Harry Gant
8. #2-L. D. Ottinger
9. #11-Jack Ingram
10. #28-Davey Allison

=== Advance Auto 150 ===
The Advance Auto 150 was held September 24 at Martinsville Speedway. Tommy Ellis won the pole.

Top Ten Results

1. #7-Harry Gant
2. #84-Mike Alexander
3. #42-Elton Sawyer
4. #21-Larry Pearson
5. #34-Jimmy Spencer
6. #22-Rick Mast
7. #56-Ronald Cooper
8. #0-Joe Millikan
9. #6-Tommy Houston
10. #25-Rob Moroso

=== All Pro 300 ===
The All Pro 300 was held October 8 at Charlotte Motor Speedway. Harry Gant won the pole.

Top Ten Results

1. #25-Rob Moroso
2. #15-Geoff Bodine
3. #81-Bobby Hillin Jr.
4. #52-Ken Schrader
5. #17-Darrell Waltrip
6. #99-Tommy Ellis
7. #5-Jimmy Hensley
8. #47-Billy Standridge
9. #66-Rusty Wallace
10. #32-Dale Jarrett

=== AC-Delco 200 ===
The AC-Delco 200 was held October 22 at North Carolina Motor Speedway. Harry Gant won the pole.

Top Ten Results

1. #7-Harry Gant
2. #8-Dale Earnhardt
3. #28-Davey Allison
4. #17-Darrell Waltrip
5. #6-Tommy Houston
6. #15-Geoff Bodine
7. #81-Bobby Hillin Jr.
8. #52-Ken Schrader
9. #99-Tommy Ellis
10. #79-Dave Rezendes

=== Winston Classic ===
The Winston Classic was held October 30 at Martinsville Speedway. Tommy Houston won the pole.

Top Ten Results

1. #7-Harry Gant
2. #25-Rob Moroso
3. #99-Tommy Ellis
4. #2-L. D. Ottinger
5. #22-Rick Mast
6. #97-Morgan Shepherd
7. #42-Elton Sawyer
8. #75-Brad Teague
9. #6-Tommy Houston
10. #81-Bobby Hillin Jr.

== Full Drivers' Championship ==
(key) Bold – Pole position awarded by time. Italics – Pole position set by owner's points. * – Most laps led. ** - All laps led.

Pos	Driver	DAY	HCY	CAR	MAR	DAR	BRI	LNG	NZH	SBO	NSV	CLT	DOV	ROU	LAN	LVL	MYB	OXF	SBO	HCY	LNG	IRP	ROU	BRI	DAR	RCH	DOV	MAR	CLT	CAR	MAR	Pts
1	Tommy Ellis	18	4	6	22	14	2	**1***	10	**3**	20	12	6	6	17	1	25*	7	2	3	**1***	3*	7	**24**	14	4	2	**15***	6	9	3	4281
2	Rob Moroso	9	10	22	3	6	4	13	2*	7	16	4	12	4	18	20	1	40	**13***	**9**	6	33	3	27	8	3	34	10	1	11	2	3986
3	Larry Pearson	30	6	35	**23**	7	**14***	2	22	1*	**4**	39	2	2	**3**	19	2	**29**	1	5	7	4	**21**	1*	13	2*	12	4	22	12	20	3981
4	Mike Alexander	7	1*	2	4	11	13	9	18	2	9	9	**10***	5	5	4	20	43	20	18	8	11	2	2	7	24	22	2	26	17	22	3966
5	Tommy Houston	11	2	36	11	16	7	4	19	5	7	25	20	**1***	1*	17	3	38	3	1	4	2	6	8	11	33	37	9	11	5	**9***	3964
6	Jimmy Hensley	17	7	10	1	12	11	22	5	14	6	18	24	7	2	3	15	28	12	2*	5	12	22	5	29	6	15	27	7	19	25	3837
7	Jimmy Spencer	29	16	11	8	20	5	8	8	12	3	16	28	3	8	5	18	11	17	22	9	17	16	6	6	16	6	5	29	13	16	3801
8	Rick Mast	10	15	7	7	33	9	11	1	10	13	21	23	14	12	21	6	13	5	8	5	18	1*	17	12	25	21	6	25	27	5	3773
9	L. D. Ottinger	22	14	30	2*	29	17	14	20	6	10	15	11	9	4	2*	**21**	24	14	23	13	13	5	9	21	8	8	23	24	14	4	3670
10	Jack Ingram	25	3	23	5	25	3	3	4	23	2	19	25	24	19	22	5	8	4	4	2	35	11	22	18	28	9	25	28	34	13	3485
11	Ed Berrier	38	19	28	20	38	6	12	31	21	5	10	4	13	13	6	26	37	7	21	10	23	4	26	30	10	27	28	16	21	26	3204
12	Billy Standridge	39	23		12	19	26	16	30	13	14	32	32	10	7	23	14	19	18	16	16	22	13	14	20	17	14	19	8	38	21	3040
13	Steve Grissom	15		15	18	17	16	17	9	19	22	42	8	18	14	8	24	46	22	17	20	24	23	19	36	5	25	31	17	26	18	2969
14	Mike Swaim	**13**	18	20	17	35	27	20	29	18	12	26	35	20	10	10	10	31	24	20	14	15	19	21	26	19	17	14	41	23		2918
15	Ronald Cooper			18	16			21	25	20	15	22	26	15	16	12	22		6	11	12	26	8	18	19	20	5	7	15	28	14	2843
16	Elton Sawyer	28	21	38	21	23	22	6	34	15	25	36					7	35	8	12	15	16	9	15	17	29	36	3	34	15	7	2686
17	Tommy Sigmon		25		15	28	15	7	27	8	11		13	23	11	9	13		9	10	19	32	24	31	25	7		24	31	35	32	2639
18	Joe Thurman	20		25		26	25	18	14	9	17			13	15	14	12		19	19	21	21	12	20	23	13	31	21	35	30		2486
19	Harry Gant	8	11	5		2*	8					6					23							4	1*	**1**	**7**	1	**38**	**1**	1	2238
20	Ronnie Silver	16					21	10		4	8	28		8	9	7	11	DNQ	10	7	11		14	13				22		32	17	2217
21	Bobby Hillin Jr.	24		4		5			23			2	1				9					30		12	31	12	4	16	3	7	10	2105
22	Kenny Burks	26	22		9		28	15		11			27	12	6	13	28		23	15	17		10	30			38	26			23	1968
23	Brad Teague	40	20	29	14	34	10		12			34	5				8							11	10		11*	32	39	18	8	1781
24	Morgan Shepherd	44	24	8		32	29		28			8	29				30	17				1			5	32	3		42	16	6	1646
25	Dale Earnhardt	37	8	**27***		4	1		6	25		5					27					29		3	32				33	2		1633
26	Dale Jarrett	5	**5**	3	25	3	20					1*	30											32	35	34		30	10	40	11	1607
27	Bobby Dotter	DNQ	13	21	24		24	19	21	24	24			17		**24**	17			6		6		16				29	DNQ			1600
28	Larry Pollard	14	9	9	10	13	12	5	7	22	21	24	15																			1489
29	Darrell Waltrip	3*				10					1*	37	31			16						5		29					5	4		1262
30	Mark Martin	4		1		9	23					33										7		10	38	9	35	18	36	39		1211
31	Geoff Bodine	2				**1**						**29***												25	**2**	26			2*	6	27	1171
32	Davey Allison	6		13		40			32			40										28		7	4		10		DNQ	3*		1111
33	Ken Schrader	42		12		15			33			17	3												39		28		4	8		1050
34	Patty Moise	33		24		18	19					31													27	15	26		19	33	19	1001
35	Max Prestwood		12		6												4			14				28		27		12				846
36	Dale Shaw	43		19		27			16				33					20				25			37	18	19					756
37	Bobby Allison	1				30	30		3			3																				656
38	Tom Peck	DNQ										20	9												24		16		30	29		596
39	Jamie Aube								11				16					14				20				11	18					587
40	Jeff Burton				28					17				11					11				15									569
41	Bosco Lowe	35		16	26	39	31				18																				31	553
42	Kelly Moore			32		36							7					**2***				**10**				31	29					548
43	Kyle Petty	12		14		37	18					14	34									8			15		30		37	25		537
44	Tom Harrington										19					15			16			9										477
45	Joe Millikan																						20					8	44	37	12	455
46	Sterling Marlin										23	11														14			21			445
47	Mike Porter	19											11	31														13				430
48	Joe Bessey								38				19					21				27				21	24					428
49	Donny Ling Jr.																						18			23		20			15	424
50	Brett Hearn	32		26		22			15			41	21																			410
51	Dave Rezendes												14																27	10		337
52	Chuck Bown	Wth				24			24									10									13					306
53	Bobby Labonte			37		31						27													16		32		43			298
54	Rusty Wallace	27				8			13			30													9				9			297
55	Billy Hicks		17		19																					30			DNQ			291
56	Tommy Riggins	36		34		21						35																	DNQ			274
57	Bill Gratton				14				37					22																		273
58	Dick McCabe	21																1				19					36					270
59	Ben Hess																								24				20	31		270
60	Andy Petree																									36		17		22	30	240
61	Bill Elliott											7																	23			240
62	Michael Waltrip																					14		23	3		1		12			221
63	Donnie Allison	23										13																	DNQ			218
64	Rickie Smith													21			16						17									215
65	Dave Lind								17				22					DNQ														209
66	Larry Brolsma								26				17																			197
67	Hut Stricklin													19						24												197
68	Pete Silva								36									33				34									28	195
69	Joe Cudmore											23															23		DNQ			188
70	Frank Fleming																								28					24		170
71	Neil Bonnett	41																											13			164
72	John Linville	DNQ		31																25												158
73	Jeff McClure								35								29		21		18											134
74	Kenny Wallace																											11				130
75	Gary Neice																			13												124
76	Rich Vogler	Wth		17																												112
77	Joey Kourafas												18					9														109
78	Ken Bouchard																												18			109
79	Wes Burnette																19															106
80	Tim Nooner																											20				103
81	Dave Davis			39									36					DNQ														101
82	Bobby Dragon																	4								22						97
83	Ed Ferree							27		16									15													94
84	Wayne Patterson																														24	91
85	Allen Applegate										26																					85
86	Robert Ingram	31																														70
87	Brian Weber																					31										70
88	Dave Simpson																												32			67
89	Joe Harrison	Wth		33																												64
90	Preston Brown																								33				DNQ			64
91	Glenn Jarrett	34																														61
92	Jimmy Edwards Jr.																								34				DNQ			61
93	Robbie Crouch																	18								35						58
94	Kirk Bryant																												DNQ	36		55
95	Larry Cates																					36										55
96	Darrell Holman											38																				49
97	Randy LaJoie																	3											40			43
98	Paul Redford				27																											
99	Gregg Lessard																	DNQ													29	
100	Bobby Hamilton																												14	20		
101	Jeff Stevens																	47														
102	Bob Healey																	45														
103	Bobby Gada																	44														
104	Dave Dion																	42														
105	Leland Kangas																	41														
106	Bobby Gahan																	39														
107	Bobby Babb Jr.																	36														
108	Jon Lizotte																	34														
109	Mike Johnson																	32														
110	Ron Moon																	30														
111	Bruce Haley																	27														
112	Steve Knowlton																	26														
113	Jimmy Burns																	25														
114	Kenny Robbins																	23														
115	Leo Poirier																	22														
116	Larry Caron																	5														
117	Darren Barnier																	6														
118	Stub Fadden																	12														
119	Mike Rowe																	16														
120	Billy Clark																	15														
121	Rodney Cundiff													25																		
122	Randy Craft															18																
123	Rodney Combs	DNQ																														
124	Jimmy Horton	DNQ																														
125	Ed Champagne																	DNQ														
126	Reggie Gammon																	DNQ														
127	Roger Godin																	DNQ														
128	Kevin Heath																	DNQ														
129	Jeff Kazmierski																	DNQ														
130	Dave Kimball																	DNQ														
131	Ray Lee																	DNQ														
132	George Libby																	DNQ														
133	Mike Maietta																	DNQ														
134	Barney McRae																	DNQ														
135	Kenny Wilkenson																	DNQ														
136	Roger Laperle																	DNQ														
137	Jay Currier																	DNQ														
138	Terry Clattenburg																	DNQ														
139	Aaron Bennett																	DNQ														
140	David Smith																	DNQ														
141	Steve Nelson																	DNQ														
142	Glenn Josselyn																	DNQ														
143	Gary Caron																	DNQ														
144	Dave Bath																	DNQ														
145	Jim Field																	DNQ														
146	Gary Pulcifer																	DNQ														
147	Tracy Gordon																	DNQ														
148	Lloyd Gillie																	DNQ														
149	Del Thompson																	DNQ														
150	Richard Tibbetts																	DNQ														
151	Bob Ailes																	DNQ														
152	Dale Verrill																	DNQ														
153	Albert Hammond																	DNQ														
154	Jeff Spraker																	DNQ														
155	Butch Chadbourne																	DNQ														
156	Bob Gerry																	DNQ														
157	Alan Strobridge																	DNQ														
158	Paul Richardson																	DNQ														
159	Mike Potter																												DNQ			
160	Karen Schulz																												DNQ			
161	Mark Smith																												DNQ			
162	Jack Matava	Wth																														
163	Dickie Boswell	Wth																														
164	Stuart Huffman	Wth																														
165	Brett Bodine	Wth																														
166	Ricky Vanadore	Wth																														
167	Bill Ingle	Wth																														
168	Jim Sauter	Wth																														
Pos	Driver	DAY	HCY	CAR	MAR	DAR	BRI	LNG	NZH	SBO	NSV	CLT	DOV	ROU	LAN	LVL	MYB	OXF	SBO	HCY	LNG	IRP	ROU	BRI	DAR	RCH	DOV	MAR	CLT	CAR	MAR	Pts

== See also ==
- 1988 NASCAR Winston Cup Series
- 1988 NASCAR Busch Grand National North Series
- 1988 NASCAR Winston West Series
