= Granger Select 200 =

There have been four NASCAR Busch Series races named Granger Select 200:

- Granger Select 200 (Louisville), held at Louisville Speedway in Louisville, Kentucky in 1988 and 1989
- Granger Select 200 (Nashville), held at Nashville Fairgrounds Speedway in Nashville, Tennessee in 1989
- Granger Select 200 (Hickory), held at Hickory Speedway in 1990
- Granger Select 200 (Dublin), held at New River Valley Speedway in Dublin, Virginia from 1990 to 1992
