= Jeff Spraker =

American racing driver and crew chief

- Born: Jeffrey D. Spraker; March 13, 1959 (age 67); Latham, New York, U.S.

NASCAR O'Reilly Auto Parts Series career
- 23 races run over 12 years
- Best finish: 57th (1990)
- First race: 1989 Miller Classic (Martinsville)
- Last race: 2006 Winn-Dixie 250 Presented by PepsiCo (Daytona)
Wins	Top tens	Poles
0	0	0

NASCAR FedEx Freight Truck Series career
- 9 races run over 6 years
- Best finish: 53rd (1999)
- First race: 1996 Parts America 150 (Watkins Glen)
- Last race: 1999 Kroger 225 (Louisville)
Wins	Top tens	Poles
0	0	0

Jeffrey D. Spraker (born March 13, 1959) is an American professional stock car racing driver, crew chief and team owner. He currently works as a crew chief for Martin Racing on their No. 52 Toyota in the ARCA Menards Series driven by Robert Martin. He also owns Spraker Racing Enterprises, an ARCA Menards Series team that fields the No. 63 Chevrolet part-time.

== Racing career ==
Spraker has 23 NASCAR Busch Series starts. In his first start at Martinsville Speedway in 1989, he started 26th and finished 27th after an engine failure.

== Crew chiefing career ==
In 2026, Spraker did not enter his own No. 63 car in the ARCA season opener at Daytona and he instead crew chiefed Robert Martin's No. 52 car, which failed to qualify for the race.

== Motorsports career results ==
=== NASCAR ===
(key) (Bold – Pole position awarded by qualifying time. Italics – Pole position earned by points standings or practice time. * – Most laps led.)

==== Busch Series ====
NASCAR Busch Series results
Year	Team	No.	Make	1	2	3	4	5	6	7	8	9	10	11	12	13	14	15	16	17	18	19	20	21	22	23	24	25	26	27	28	29	30	31	32	33	34	35	NBSC	Pts	Ref
1988	Spraker Racing	69	Chevy	DAY	HCY	CAR	MAR	DAR	BRI	LNG	NZH	SBO	NSV	CLT	DOV	ROU	LAN	LVL	MYB	OXF; DNQ	SBO	HCY	LNG	IRP	ROU	BRI	DAR	RCH	DOV	MAR	CLT	CAR	MAR						N/A	0	
1989	Spraker Racing	69	Olds	DAY	CAR	MAR; 27	HCY	DAR	BRI	NZH; 32	SBO; 17	LAN	NSV	CLT	DOV	ROU	LVL	VOL	MYB	SBO	HCY	DUB; 28	IRP; 33	ROU	BRI	DAR	RCH	DOV	MAR	CLT	CAR	MAR							58th	404	
1990	Spraker Racing	69	Olds	DAY	RCH	CAR; 41	MAR	HCY	DAR	BRI	LAN	SBO	NZH; 21	HCY	CLT	DOV; 32	ROU	VOL	MYB	OXF; 39	NHA; 31	SBO	DUB	IRP; 32	ROU	BRI	DAR	RCH	DOV	MAR	CLT	NHA	CAR	MAR					57th	390	
1991	Spraker Racing	69	Olds	DAY	RCH	CAR; 38	MAR	VOL	HCY	DAR	BRI	LAN	SBO	NZH	CLT	DOV	ROU	HCY	MYB	GLN	OXF	NHA	SBO	DUB	IRP	ROU	BRI	DAR	RCH	DOV; 36	CLT	NHA	CAR	MAR					90th	104	
1992	Spraker Racing	69	Olds	DAY	CAR	RCH	ATL	MAR	DAR	BRI	HCY	LAN	DUB	NZH; 31	CLT	DOV	ROU	MYB	GLN	VOL	NHA	TAL	IRP	ROU	MCH	NHA	BRI	DAR	RCH	DOV	CLT	MAR	CAR	HCY					124th	70	
1993	Spraker Racing	69	Olds	DAY	CAR	RCH	DAR	BRI	HCY	ROU	MAR	NZH; 33	CLT	DOV	MYB	GLN; DNQ	MLW	TAL	IRP	MCH	NHA	BRI	DAR	RCH	DOV	ROU	CLT	MAR	CAR	HCY	ATL								N/A	0	
1995	Spraker Racing	65	Chevy	DAY	CAR	RCH	ATL	NSV	DAR	BRI	HCY	NHA	NZH	CLT	DOV	MYB	GLN; 26	MLW	TAL	SBO	IRP	MCH	BRI	DAR	RCH	DOV	CLT	CAR	HOM										N/A	0	
2002	Fred Bickford	94	Chevy	DAY; 39	CAR	LVS	DAR	BRI	TEX	NSH	TAL	CAL	RCH								DAY; 24	CHI	GTY	PPR	IRP	MCH	BRI	DAR	RCH	DOV	KAN	CLT	MEM	ATL	CAR	PHO	HOM		91st	137	
2002	Brian Weber & Associates	8	Chevy											NHA; 39	NZH	CLT	DOV	NSH	KEN	MLW																			91st	137	
2003	Mac Hill Motorsports	56	Chevy	DAY; 39	CAR	LVS	DAR	BRI	TEX	TAL	NSH	CAL	RCH	GTY	NZH	CLT	DOV	NSH	KEN	MLW	DAY; 28	CHI																	115th	119	
2003	Stanton Barrett Motorsports	97	Chevy																				NHA; 41	PPR	IRP	MCH	BRI	DAR	RCH	DOV	KAN	CLT	MEM	ATL	PHO	CAR	HOM		115th	119	
2004	Mac Hill Motorsports	56	Chevy	DAY	CAR	LVS	DAR	BRI	TEX	NSH	TAL	CAL	GTY	RCH	NZH	CLT	DOV	NSH	KEN	MLW	DAY; 36	CHI	NHA	PPR	IRP	MCH	BRI	CAL	RCH	DOV	KAN	CLT	MEM	ATL	PHO	DAR	HOM		135th	55	
2005	Spraker Racing	63	Chevy	DAY	CAL	MXC	LVS	ATL	NSH	BRI	TEX	PHO	TAL	DAR	RCH	CLT	DOV	NSH	KEN	MLW	DAY	CHI	NHA	PPR	GTY	IRP	GLN; DNQ	MCH	BRI	CAL	RCH	DOV	KAN	CLT	MEM	TEX	PHO	HOM	N/A	0	
2006	Spraker Racing	63	Chevy	DAY	CAL	MXC	LVS	ATL	BRI	TEX	NSH	PHO	TAL	RCH	DAR	CLT	DOV	NSH	KEN	MLW	DAY; 42	CHI	NHA	MAR	GTY	IRP	GLN	MCH	BRI	CAL	RCH	DOV	KAN	CLT	MEM	TEX	PHO	HOM	145th	37	

==== Craftsman Truck Series ====
NASCAR Craftsman Truck Series results
Year	Team	No.	Make	1	2	3	4	5	6	7	8	9	10	11	12	13	14	15	16	17	18	19	20	21	22	23	24	25	26	27	NCTC	Pts	Ref
1996	Milo Januska	39	Chevy	HOM	PHO	POR	EVG	TUS	CNS	HPT	BRI	NZH	MLW	LVL	I70	IRP	FLM	GLN; 12	NSV	RCH	NHA; 29	MAR; DNQ	NWS	SON	MMR	PHO	LVS				70th	243	
1997	Milo Januska	39	Chevy	WDW; DNQ	TUS	HOM	PHO	POR	EVG	I70	NHA; DNQ	TEX	BRI; 37	NZH	MLW	LVL; DNQ	CNS	HPT	IRP; DNQ	FLM	NSV		RCH; DNQ	MAR; DNQ	SON	MMR	CAL	PHO	LVS		60th	320	
1997	AAG Racing	65	Chevy																			GLN; 20									60th	320	
1998	Spraker Racing	69	Chevy	WDW	HOM	PHO	POR	EVG	I70	GLN	TEX	BRI	MLW	NZH	CAL	PPR	IRP	NHA; 26	FLM	NSV	HPT	LVL	RCH	MEM	GTY	MAR; DNQ	SON	MMR	PHO	LVS	87th	119	
1999	Spraker Racing	69	Chevy	HOM	PHO	EVG	MMR	MAR	MEM	PPR	I70	BRI	TEX	PIR	GLN; 28	MLW	NSV														53rd	298	
1999	Mike Albernaz	27	Chevy															NZH; 30	MCH	NHA; 31	IRP	GTY	HPT	RCH	LVS						53rd	298	
1999	Joey Sonntag	73	Chevy																							LVL; 29	TEX	CAL			53rd	298	
2000	Spraker Racing	69	Chevy	DAY; DNQ	HOM	PHO	MMR	MAR	PIR	GTY	MEM	PPR	EVG	TEX	KEN	GLN	MLW	NHA	NZH	MCH	IRP	NSV	CIC	RCH	DOV	TEX	CAL				N/A	0	
2001	Spraker Racing	69	Chevy	DAY	HOM	MMR	MAR	GTY	DAR	PPR	DOV	TEX	MEM	MLW	KAN	KEN	NHA	IRP	NSH	CIC	NZH	RCH; DNQ	SBO	TEX	LVS	PHO	CAL				N/A	0	

==== Winston Modified Tour ====
NASCAR Winston Modified Tour results
Year	Team	No.	Make	1	2	3	4	5	6	7	8	9	10	11	12	13	14	15	16	17	18	19	20	21	22	23	24	25	26	27	28	29	NWMTC	Pts	Ref
1985	Spraker Racing	63	Pontiac	TMP; 18	MAR	STA	MAR; 29	NEG	WFD	NEG							HOL; 18	HOL	RIV	CAT	EPP	TMP	WFD	RIV	STA	TMP	POC	TIO	OXF	STA	TMP	MAR	44th	337	
1985	?	22	Pontiac								SPE; 22	RIV	CLA	STA	TMP	NEG																	44th	337	
1986	Spraker Racing	63	?	ROU	MAR	STA	TMP	MAR	NEG	MND	EPP	NEG	WFD	SPE	RIV	NEG	TMP	RIV	TMP	RIV	STA	TMP; 43	POC	TIO	OXF	STA	TMP	MAR					N/A	0	
1987	Spraker Racing	63NY	?	ROU	MAR	TMP	STA	CNB; 23																									18th	1596	
1987	Spraker Racing	63	Pontiac						STA; 26	MND; 21	WFD	JEN; 20	SPE; 20	RIV	TMP; 25	RPS	EPP; 20	RIV	STA; 22	TMP; 25	RIV	SEE; 23		POC; 46	TIO; 18	TMP; 32	OXF; 27	TMP; 21	ROU; 23	MAR; 31	STA		18th	1596	
1987	?	72	?																				STA; 23										18th	1596	

=== ARCA Re/Max Series ===
(key) (Bold – Pole position awarded by qualifying time. Italics – Pole position earned by points standings or practice time. * – Most laps led.)

ARCA Re/Max Series results
Year	Team	No.	Make	1	2	3	4	5	6	7	8	9	10	11	12	13	14	15	16	17	18	19	20	21	22	23	24	25	ARMC	Pts	Ref
2001	Spraker Racing	25	Chevy	DAY	NSH	WIN	SLM	GTY	KEN	CLT	KAN	MCH	POC	MEM	GLN; 18	KEN	MCH	POC	NSH	ISF	CHI	DSF	SLM	TOL	BLN	CLT	TAL	ATL	144th	140	
2002	Spraker Racing	69	Ford	DAY; 38	ATL	NSH	SLM	KEN	CLT	KAN	POC	MCH	TOL	SBO	KEN	BLN	POC	NSH	ISF	WIN	DSF	CHI	SLM	TAL; DNQ	CLT				162nd	65	
2003	Spraker Racing	54	Pontiac	DAY; 16	ATL	NSH	SLM	TOL	KEN	CLT	BLN	KAN	MCH	LER	POC; Wth	POC	NSH	ISF	WIN	DSF	CHI	SLM	TAL	CLT	SBO				136th	150	
2005	Mark Karnes	07	Dodge	DAY; 9	NSH	SLM	KEN	TOL	LAN	MIL	POC	MCH	KAN	KEN	BLN	POC	GTW	LER	NSH	MCH	ISF	TOL	DSF	CHI	SLM	TAL			110th	185	
