= 1989 NASCAR Busch Series =

American motorsport season

Seasons
- ← 1988 1990 →

The 1989 NASCAR Busch Series began February 18, 1989 and ended October 29, 1989. Rob Moroso of Moroso Racing won the championship.

== Races ==
=== Goody's 300 ===
The Goody's 300 was held on February 18 at Daytona International Speedway. Kenny Wallace won the pole.

Top Ten Results

1. #17-Darrell Waltrip
2. #72-Rusty Wallace
3. #25-Rob Moroso
4. #3-Dale Earnhardt
5. #15-Geoff Bodine
6. #75-Rick Wilson
7. #11-Jack Ingram
8. #30-Michael Waltrip
9. #52-Ken Schrader
10. #36-Kenny Wallace
- Donnie Allison made his last ever start in any NASCAR series. He crashed out after completing 7 laps, finishing 37th.

=== Goodwrench 200 ===
The Goodwrench 200 was held March 4 at North Carolina Motor Speedway. Rob Moroso won the pole.

Top Ten Results

1. #25-Rob Moroso
2. #3-Dale Earnhardt
3. #99-Tommy Ellis
4. #44-Bobby Labonte
5. #6-Tommy Houston 1 lap down
6. #2-L. D. Ottinger 1 lap down
7. #11-Jack Ingram 1 lap down
8. #34-Jimmy Spencer 1 lap down
9. #56-Ronald Cooper 1 lap down
10. #86-Dana Patten 1 lap down

=== Miller Classic ===
The Miller Classic was a 200 lap race held March 10 at Martinsville Speedway. Rob Moroso won the pole.

Top Ten Results

1. #99-Tommy Ellis
2. #6-Tommy Houston
3. #42-Elton Sawyer
4. #4-Max Prestwood
5. #49-Ed Ferree
6. #34-Jimmy Spencer 1 lap down
7. #36-Kenny Wallace 1 lap down
8. #63-Chuck Bown 1 lap down
9. #1-Mark Martin 1 lap down
10. #12-Jeff Burton 1 lap down

=== Mountain Dew 400 ===
The Mountain Dew 400 was held March 25 at Hickory Motor Speedway. Dale Jarrett won the pole.

Top Ten Results

1. #34-Jimmy Spencer*
2. #99-Tommy Ellis
3. #25-Rob Moroso
4. #11-Jack Ingram
5. #32-Dale Jarrett* 1 lap down
6. #7-Harry Gant 1 lap down
7. #22-Rick Mast 1 lap down
8. #36-Kenny Wallace 1 lap down
9. #24-Joe Thurman 1 lap down
10. #3-Dale Earnhardt 2 laps down
- Jimmy Spencer spun out Dale Jarrett in turn 3 with 2 laps to go in order to win the race. Fines were handed out to both Spencer and Jarrett for inappropriate actions afterwards by NASCAR.

=== Country Squire 200 ===
The Country Squire 200 was held April 1 at Darlington Raceway. Geoff Bodine won the pole.

Top Ten Results

1. #15-Geoff Bodine
2. #1-Mark Martin
3. #7-Harry Gant
4. #55-Phil Parsons
5. #75-Rick Wilson
6. #3-Dale Earnhardt
7. #28-Davey Allison
8. #52-Ken Schrader
9. #25-Rob Moroso 1 lap down
10. #56-Ronald Cooper 1 lap down

=== Budweiser 200 ===
The Budweiser 200 was held April 10 at Bristol Motor Speedway. Rick Wilson won the pole.

Top Ten Results

1. #75-Rick Wilson*
2. #1-Mark Martin
3. #22-Rick Mast
4. #9-Steve Grissom
5. #36-Kenny Wallace
6. #25-Rob Moroso 1 lap down
7. #2-L. D. Ottinger 1 lap down
8. #30-Michael Waltrip 2 laps down
9. #34-Jimmy Spencer 2 laps down
10. #6-Tommy Houston 2 laps down
- This was Wilson's first career Busch Series victory.

=== GM Parts 300 ===
The GM Parts 300 was held April 30 at Nazareth Speedway. Tommy Houston won the pole.

Top Ten Results

1. #81-Bobby Hillin Jr.*
2. #99-Tommy Ellis
3. #30-Michael Waltrip
4. #86-Tom Peck
5. #28-Davey Allison
6. #52-Ken Schrader 1 lap down
7. #79-Dave Rezendes 3 laps down
8. #11-Jack Ingram 5 laps down
9. #34-Jimmy Spencer 6 laps down
10. #60-Dale Shaw 11 laps down
- This was Hillin's last Busch Series victory.

=== Busch 200 ===
The Busch 200 was held May 6 at South Boston Speedway. Rob Moroso won the pole.

Top Ten Results

1. #99-Tommy Ellis
2. #11-Jack Ingram
3. #6-Tommy Houston
4. #25-Rob Moroso
5. #22-Rick Mast
6. #36-Kenny Wallace
7. #56-Ronald Cooper
8. #63-Chuck Bown 1 lap down
9. #30-Ronnie Silver 1 lap down
10. #32-Robert Powell 1 lap down

=== Big Star/Nestle 200 ===
The Big Star/Nestle 200 was held May 13 at Lanier Raceway. Chuck Bown won the pole.

Top Ten Results

1. #56-Ronald Cooper
2. #25-Rob Moroso
3. #6-Tommy Houston
4. #32-Robert Powell
5. #11-Jack Ingram
6. #99-Tommy Ellis
7. #22-Rick Mast
8. #47-Billy Standridge
9. #12-Jeff Burton 1 lap down
10. #81-Bobby Hillin Jr. 1 lap down
- This was the only victory Ronald Cooper took in the NASCAR Busch Series.

=== Granger Select 200 ===
The Granger Select 200 was held May 20 at Nashville Speedway USA. Kenny Wallace won the pole.

Top Ten Results

1. #22-Rick Mast
2. #8-Bobby Hamilton
3. #36-Kenny Wallace
4. #11-Jack Ingram 1 lap down
5. #56-Ronald Cooper 1 lap down
6. #30-Ronnie Silver 1 lap down
7. #99-Tommy Ellis 2 laps down
8. #63-Chuck Bown 2 laps down
9. #34-Jimmy Spencer 2 laps down
10. #2-L. D. Ottinger 3 laps down
- This would be the last race for the Busch Series at this track until 1995.

=== Champion 300 ===
The Champion 300 was held May 27 at Charlotte Motor Speedway. Greg Sacks won the pole.

Top Ten Results

1. #25-Rob Moroso
2. #17-Darrell Waltrip
3. #30-Michael Waltrip
4. #33-Brad Teague
5. #22-Rick Mast
6. #32-Dale Jarrett
7. #6-Tommy Houston
8. #11-Jack Ingram
9. #72-Rusty Wallace
10. #15-Geoff Bodine

=== Budweiser 200 ===
The Budweiser 200 was held June 3 at Dover International Speedway. Harry Gant won the pole.

Top Ten Results

1. #75-Rick Wilson*
2. #55-Phil Parsons
3. #87-Dale Earnhardt
4. #1-Mark Martin
5. #99-Tommy Ellis
6. #63-Chuck Bown
7. #36-Kenny Wallace
8. #52-Ken Schrader
9. #86-Dana Patten
10. #71-Randy LaJoie 1 lap down
- This would be Henderson Motorsports' last NASCAR win until 2017.
- This was Wilson's last Busch Series victory.

=== Roses Stores 200 ===
The Roses Stores 200 was held June 10 at Orange County Speedway. Jimmy Spencer won the pole.

Top Ten Results

1. #34-Jimmy Spencer*
2. #6-Tommy Houston 1 lap down
3. #22-Rick Mast 1 lap down
4. #36-Kenny Wallace 1 lap down
5. #30-Ronnie Silver 1 lap down
6. #42-Elton Sawyer 1 lap down
7. #81-Kyle Petty 2 laps down
8. #12-Jeff Burton 3 laps down
9. #59-Robert Pressley 3 laps down
10. #56-Ronald Cooper 5 laps down
- Jimmy Spencer lapped the entire field in this race.

=== Granger Select 200 ===
The Granger Select 200 was held June 24 at Louisville Motor Speedway. Kenny Wallace won the pole.

Top Ten Results

1. #6-Tommy Houston
2. #30-Michael Waltrip
3. #42-Elton Sawyer
4. #2-L. D. Ottinger
5. #63-Chuck Bown
6. #02-Kenny Burks
7. #36-Kenny Wallace
8. #96-Tom Peck
9. #25-Rob Moroso 1 lap down
10. #9-Steve Grissom 1 lap down

=== Firecracker 200 ===
The Firecracker 200 was held July 1 at Volusia County Speedway in Barberville, Florida. Rob Moroso won the pole.

Top Ten Results

1. #25-Rob Moroso
2. #99-Tommy Ellis
3. #63-Chuck Bown
4. #2-L. D. Ottinger
5. #11-Jack Ingram
6. #56-Ronald Cooper
7. #22-Rick Mast
8. #36-Kenny Wallace
9. #30-Ronnie Silver
10. #79-Dave Rezendes

=== Carolina Pride/Budweiser 200 ===
The Carolina Pride/Budweiser 200 was held July 4 at Myrtle Beach Speedway. Rick Mast won the pole.

Top Ten Results

1. #34-Jimmy Spencer
2. #11-Jack Ingram
3. #8-Bobby Hamilton
4. #12-Jeff Burton
5. #42-Elton Sawyer
6. #02-Kenny Burks
7. #25-Rob Moroso
8. #32-Robert Powell
9. #99-Tommy Ellis
10. #96-Tom Peck −1 lap

=== Coors 200 ===
The Coors 200 was held July 15 at South Boston Speedway. Chuck Bown won the pole.

Top Ten Results

1. #6-Tommy Houston
2. #99-Tommy Ellis
3. #63-Chuck Bown
4. #2-L. D. Ottinger
5. #25-Rob Moroso
6. #90-Larry Pearson
7. #70-Jimmy Hensley
8. #56-Ronald Cooper
9. #36-Kenny Wallace
10. #24-Joe Thurman

=== Pepsi 200 ===
The Pepsi 200 was held July 22 at Hickory Motor Speedway. Jimmy Hensley won the pole.

Top Ten Results

1. #99-Tommy Ellis
2. #34-Randy LaJoie*
3. #11-Jack Ingram
4. #22-Rick Mast
5. #6-Tommy Houston
6. #70-Jimmy Hensley 1 lap down
7. #41-Max Prestwood 1 lap down
8. #2-L. D. Ottinger 1 lap down
9. #36-Kenny Wallace 1 lap down
10. #32-Robert Powell 2 laps down
- Randy LaJoie replaced Jimmy Spencer, who had been released.

=== Old Milwaukee 200 ===
The Old Milwaukee 200 was held July 29 at New River Valley Speedway in Dublin, Virginia. Rob Moroso won the pole.

Top Ten Results

1. #22-Rick Mast
2. #63-Chuck Bown
3. #9-Steve Grissom
4. #02-Kenny Burks
5. #2-L. D. Ottinger
6. #8-Bobby Hamilton
7. #6-Tommy Houston
8. #11-Jack Ingram
9. #36-Kenny Wallace 1 lap down
10. #59-Robert Pressley 1 lap down

=== Kroger 200 ===
The Kroger 200 was held August 5 at Indianapolis Raceway Park. Michael Waltrip won the pole.

Top Ten Results

1. #30-Michael Waltrip
2. #1-Mark Martin
3. #6-Tommy Houston
4. #86-Dana Patten
5. #3-Dale Earnhardt
6. #9-Steve Grissom
7. #2-L. D. Ottinger 1 lap down
8. #63-Chuck Bown 1 lap down
9. #96-Tom Peck 1 lap down
10. #90-Morgan Shepherd 1 lap down

=== Texas Pete 200 ===
The Texas Pete 200 was held August 12 at Orange County Speedway in Rougemont, North Carolina. Rob Moroso won the pole.

Top Ten Results

1. #59-Robert Pressley*
2. #6-Tommy Houston
3. #99-Tommy Ellis
4. #22-Rick Mast
5. #30-Ronnie Silver
6. #2-L. D. Ottinger
7. #12-Jeff Burton 1 lap down
8. #14-Wayne Patterson 1 lap down
9. #96-Tom Peck 1 lap down
10. #90-Davey Johnson 1 lap down
- This was Robert Pressley's first career Busch Grand National victory.

=== Jay Johnson 200 ===
The Jay Johnson 200 was held August 25 at Bristol Motor Speedway. Morgan Shepherd won the pole.

Top Ten Results

1. #1-Mark Martin
2. #2-L. D. Ottinger
3. #22-Rick Mast
4. #32-Dale Jarrett
5. #3-Dale Earnhardt
6. #87-Jimmy Spencer
7. #02-Kenny Burks 1 lap down
8. #99-Tommy Ellis 2 laps down
9. #36-Kenny Wallace 2 laps down
10. #6-Tommy Houston 2 laps down

=== Gatorade 200 ===
The Gatorade 200 was held September 2 at Darlington Raceway. Ken Schrader won the pole.

Top Ten Results

1. #7-Harry Gant
2. #55-Phil Parsons
3. #01-Jack Pennington
4. #3-Dale Earnhardt
5. #96-Tom Peck
6. #99-Tommy Ellis
7. #44-Bobby Labonte
8. #2-L. D. Ottinger
9. #4-Ed Berrier
10. #92-Jimmy Means

=== Commonwealth 200 ===
The Commonwealth 200 was held September 9 at Richmond International Raceway. Tommy Ellis won the pole.

Top Ten Results

1. #8-Bobby Hamilton*
2. #99-Tommy Ellis
3. #36-Kenny Wallace
4. #25-Rob Moroso
5. #3-Dale Earnhardt
6. #11-Jack Ingram
7. #6-Tommy Houston
8. #1-Mark Martin 1 lap down
9. #2-L. D. Ottinger 1 lap down
10. #81-Bobby Hillin Jr. 1 lap down
- This was Hamilton's only Busch Series victory.

=== Ames/Peak 200 ===
The Ames/Peak 200 was held September 16 at Dover International Speedway. Michael Waltrip won the pole.

Top Ten Results

1. #52-Ken Schrader
2. #1-Mark Martin
3. #56-Ronald Cooper
4. #82-Kyle Petty
5. #17-Darrell Waltrip 1 lap down
6. #63-Chuck Bown 1 lap down
7. #22-Rick Mast 1 lap down
8. #2-L. D. Ottinger 1 lap down
9. #96-Tom Peck 1 lap down
10. #86-Dana Patten 2 laps down

=== Zerex 150 ===
The Zerex 150 was held September 23 at Martinsville Speedway. Rob Moroso won the pole.

Top Ten Results

1. #6-Tommy Houston
2. #25-Rob Moroso
3. #12-Jeff Burton
4. #56-Ronald Cooper
5. #2-L. D. Ottinger
6. #47-Billy Standridge
7. #79-Dave Rezendes
8. #63-Chuck Bown
9. #75-Butch Miller 1 lap down
10. #87-Jimmy Spencer 1 lap down

=== All Pro 300 ===
The All Pro 300 was held October 7 at Charlotte Motor Speedway. Michael Waltrip won the pole.

Top Ten Results

1. #25-Rob Moroso*
2. #30-Michael Waltrip
3. #32-Dale Jarrett
4. #01-Jack Pennington
5. #87-Jimmy Spencer
6. #44-Bobby Labonte
7. #7-Harry Gant
8. #36-Kenny Wallace 1 lap down
9. #9-Steve Grissom 1 lap down
10. #55-Phil Parsons 2 laps down
- This was Rob Moroso's 3rd consecutive Busch Grand National victory at Charlotte Motor Speedway.
- This was also Moroso's last Busch Series victory.

=== AC-Delco 200 ===
The AC-Delco 200 was held October 21 at North Carolina Motor Speedway. Mark Martin won the pole.

Top Ten Results

1. #7-Harry Gant
2. #55-Phil Parsons
3. #8-Bobby Hamilton
4. #17-Darrell Waltrip
5. #6-Tommy Houston
6. #81-Bobby Hillin Jr.
7. #3-Michael Waltrip
8. #34-Randy LaJoie
9. #52-Ken Schrader
10. #99-Tommy Ellis 1 lap down

=== Winston Classic ===
The Winston Classic was a 200 lap race held October 29 at Martinsville Speedway. Rick Mast won the pole.

Top Ten Results

1. #2-L. D. Ottinger
2. #7-Harry Gant
3. #25-Rob Moroso
4. #1-Geoff Bodine
5. #63-Chuck Bown
6. #77-Morgan Shepherd
7. #11-Jack Ingram
8. #8-Bobby Hamilton
9. #08-Bobby Dotter
10. #99-Tommy Ellis

== Full Drivers' Championship ==
(key) Bold – Pole position awarded by time. Italics – Pole position set by owner's points. * – Most laps led. ** - All laps led.

Pos	Driver	DAY	CAR	MAR	HCY	DAR	BRI	NZH	SBO	LAN	NSV	CLT	DOV	ROU	LVL	VOL	MYB	SBO	HCY	DUB	IRP	ROU	BRI	DAR	RCH	DOV	MAR	CLT	CAR	MAR	Pts
1	Rob Moroso	3*	**1**	**23**	3	9	6	22	**4**	2	18	1	17	20	9	**1***	7	5	28	**13**	14	**16**	22	12	4	23	**2**	1	12	3	4001
2	Tommy Houston	11	5	2	21	15	10	**19***	3	3*	16	7	32	2	1	12	23	1	5	7	3	2	10	17	7	13	1	39	5	24	3946
3	Tommy Ellis	39	3	1	2	16	29	2	1*	6	7	34	5	16	21	2	9	2	1*	12	15	3	8	6	**2**	12	29	16	10	10*	3945
4	L. D. Ottinger	20	6	17	13	11	7	14	12	16	10	14	13	21	4	4	22	4	8	5	7	6	2	8	9	8	5*	23	15	1	3916
5	Jack Ingram	7	7	13	4	12	22	8	2	5	4	8	15	12	14	5	2	15	3	8	19	28	12	14	6	19	21	29	19	7	3802
6	Kenny Wallace **(R)**	**10**	24	7	8	29	5	15	6	13	**3***	12	7	4	**7**	8	20	9	9	9	13	11	9	22	3	27	19	8	21	12	3750
7	Rick Mast	27	36	31	7	13	3	12	5	7	1	5	19	3	19	7	**17**	19	4	1	35	4	3	24	27	7	23	30	13	**28**	3558
8	Ronald Cooper	29	9	14	22	10	11	27	7	1	5	24	11	10	13	6	11	8	12	27	11	21	18	11	21	3	4	11	38	17	3554
9	Chuck Bown	32	23	8	19	18	13	23	8	**20**	8	23	6	26	5*	3	28	**3***	29	2*	8*	15	23	36	34	6	8	22	30	5	3349
10	Tom Peck		18	16	20	35	16	4	15	18	14	37	14	11	8	25	10	20	18	11	9	9	16	5	29	9	15	18	28	25	3171
11	Bobby Hamilton **(R)**	19		28	23	24	24	20	14	24	2	21	29	19	20	16	3	16	24	6	17	23	24	27	1	24	22	17	3	8	3133
12	Steve Grissom	17	38	11	11	29	4	39	25	22	20	16	38	18	10	18	15	14	16	3	6	12	21	26	22	21	20	9	29	21	3108
13	Jeff Burton **(R)**		19	10	12	20	26	21	11	9	11	15	27	8	16	14	4	23	26	26	16	7	31	25		22	3	21	39	26	2967
14	Billy Standridge	16	33	24	24	25	15	13	19	8	19	28	25	17	18	15	29	11	17	21	25	20	13	15			6	13	34	19	2843
15	Jimmy Spencer	34	8	6	1*	17	9	9	22	15	9	11	26	**1***	17	26	1*	17					6	37	36		10	5			2704
16	Dave Rezendes **(R)**		13		16	34	20	7	24	21	21	26	36		22	10	12	13	19	20	28	13	19	13	12	32	7	DNQ	14	31	2635
17	Joe Thurman	36	30	22	9		18	33	13	17	13	DNQ		13	11	11	25	10	13	25	21	19	17	28	16	34	24		23	20	2575
18	Elton Sawyer	23	15	3		32		24		11		32	21	6	3	23	5	12	15	24	18	17			35		30			15	2202
19	Robert Pressley **(R)**				15		19		18	12	12			9	15	13	21	26	14	10	30	1*	20		14		12	15		13	2129
20	Harry Gant	26	11*	20	6	3	30					29	**28**										28	1	25	15	26	7	1*	2	1907
21	Mark Martin	21	31	9		2	2	35				39	4				26				2		1*	42	8*	2*	17	20	**24**		1832
22	Jimmy Hensley	33		30	28	40						17	33	24	23		14	7	**6**	18	26	14	15		13		13	DNQ		32	1785
23	Michael Waltrip	8				15	8	3				3	30		2						**1**		25	23	15	**25**		**2**	7		1716
24	Kenny Burks				27				20	19	15			23	6	17	6	22	21	4		27	7		23		25				1682
25	Dale Earnhardt	4	2		10	6	27	37				20	3					28			5		5	4*	5			27			1637
26	Randy LaJoie	31				23							10						2	15	12	25	11	18	11	20	27	14	8	23	1542
27	Bobby Hillin Jr.	14	12			21		1		10		38	16					24			36			33	10	28		34	6		1460
28	Max Prestwood			4	14		14		23	14	24					19	13	29	7	14		30								DNQ	1354
29	Rick Wilson	6	27	21*		5	**1***	26				42	1*										30	34	24			28			1273
30	Brandon Baker **(R)**		39		29	28			16	26						21	30		25		23			19		29	16	38	31		1172
31	Ronnie Silver				26				9	25	6			5		9	24		20			5						DNQ	37		1155
32	Ken Schrader	9	14			8		6				41	8								31			**35**		1		32	9		1108
33	Phil Parsons	24	35			4	12					27	2											2		31		10	2		1098
34	Dale Jarrett	13	21		**5**	31						6											4	40			31	3*	27		1049
35	Patty Moise	38	26			22	25					35	18										29	30		16		26	16	30	1023
36	Darrell Waltrip	1				37						2	37								32				28	5		31	4		985
37	Ed Berrier	12		26	25	42	28	31				40	12											9				42	11		961
38	Davey Allison	DNQ	29			7		5				31					27				29		14	29	32				26		954
39	Dan Patten		10	19				16					9								4				19	10					893
40	Robert Powell								10	4	22			15			8		10										20		785
41	Bobby Labonte		4			38						13					31							7				6	35		757
42	John Linville																18	25	22	22	22						14	DNQ		27	691
43	Jamie Aube		37	15				28					24								24				20	17		DNQ			646
44	Wayne Patterson		22						21			DNQ		25				27				8			17			DNQ		DNQ	621
45	Joe Bessey		20					17					20								34				30	14					573
46	Donny Ling Jr.							41					31							16		22			31			36		16	562
47	Jack Pennington		17			39						25	23											3				4			553
48	Brad Teague	18				36		36				4	34														18				549
49	Jay Fogleman													22				21	11	23		18		20							536
50	Bobby Moon													14				18				24					11			29	527
51	Dave Simpson **(R)**	28	34		18	26	21	25																							522
52	Morgan Shepherd	15																			10		**27**	38				37	40	6	478
53	Geoff Bodine	5				**1***						10*																		4	469
54	Kelly Moore	40		29				11													DNQ				33	11					443
55	Ed Ferree			5	17																							DNQ	36	14	443
56	Rusty Wallace	2				30		38				9											26	41				35			430
57	Larry Pollard							34								24			23									DNQ	32	18	422
58	Jeff Spraker			27				32	17											28	33										404
59	Lee Faulk		16			33						18				20	16														391
60	Don Satterfield														12	22			27					32							373
61	Kyle Petty											33		7												4				DNQ	370
62	Tom Harrington			32			17	DNQ			23																32				340
63	Mike Porter			18														19		19								DNQ			321
64	Ron Lamell							18													20					30					285
65	Jimmy Means	30										30												10							280
66	Dave Davis		28	12									35																		264
67	Davey Johnson																			17		10									246
68	Randy Baker																							31				33	22		231
69	Greg Sacks		25			41						**22**																			225
70	Curtis Markham												22											21							197
71	Jeff McClure											DNQ																19	25		194
72	Billy Clark							29																	18						185
73	Ken Bouchard	35	32																							18					176
74	Eric Wilson																		31			26						DNQ			155
75	Todd Cray																					29					28				155
76	Dale Shaw							10																							134
77	Sterling Marlin																							39				25			134
78	Allen Applegate										17																				112
79	Ted Musgrave																											12	17		112
80	Grant Adcox																												18		109
81	Dave Marcis					19																									106
82	Don Jenkins											19																DNQ			106
83	Ben Hess	22																												DNQ	97
84	Bill Gratton						23																								94
85	Debbie Lunsford									23																					94
86	Brett Hearn	25										DNQ																			88
87	Dick McCabe																								26						85
88	Joey Kourafas																				27										82
89	Martin Truex Sr.			25				30																						22	73
90	Lloyd Gillie												DNQ													33					64
91	Joe Nemechek																												33		64
92	Ed St. Angelo Jr.																									35					58
93	Hut Stricklin											36																			55
94	Donnie Allison	37																													52
95	Thierry Tassin							40																							43
96	Jeff Purvis																											40			43
97	Jack Sprague																											41			40
98	David Green																		30												
99	Jimmy Horton																							16							
100	Butch Miller																										9				
101	Bobby Dotter																													9	
102	Larry Pearson																	6												11	
103	Frank Fleming																											24			
104	Jim Sauter																									26					
105	Larry Brolsma							DNQ				DNQ																			
106	Ed Lavoie												DNQ																		
107	Randy MacDonald																											DNQ			
108	Brian Ross																											DNQ			
109	Jim Field																													DNQ	
Pos	Driver	DAY	CAR	MAR	HCY	DAR	BRI	NZH	SBO	LAN	NSV	CLT	DOV	ROU	LVL	VOL	MYB	SBO	HCY	DUB	IRP	ROU	BRI	DAR	RCH	DOV	MAR	CLT	CAR	MAR	Pts

== Rookie of the Year ==
Kenny Wallace won the first Busch Series Rookie of the Year Award ever given, posting sixteen top-ten finishes and winning three poles. Bobby Hamilton and Jeff Burton, both of whom would later go on to win the award in Winston Cup, finished second and third in the standings, respectively. Dave Rezendes, Robert Pressley, and Brandon Baker were the only other full-time contenders, as Dave Simpson, Ed Ferree, and Tom Harrington only ran a limited schedule.

== Additional Information ==
On September 30, 1990, less than 1 year after becoming champion, Rob Moroso was killed in an automobile crash near Mooresville, North Carolina, only hours after finishing 21st in the NASCAR Winston Cup Holly Farms 400 at North Wilkesboro Speedway. Traveling at estimated 75 mph (121 km/h), Moroso lost control of his vehicle on a curve with a 35 mph (56 km/h) posted speed limit. The resulting collision killed both Moroso and Tammy Williams, the driver of the vehicle in the opposite lane. The curve in which Moroso was killed is now called Dead Mans Curve, by the townspeople of Mooresville, NC.

Investigations revealed that he had been driving under the influence of alcohol. His blood alcohol level was 0.22, over twice the then legal level of 0.10. He also had been convicted of speeding four times. Judges could have revoked his license at least twice but the charges were reduced.

Moroso earned enough points after completing just 25 of 29 NASCAR Winston Cup races that he was posthumously awarded the Raybestos NASCAR Rookie of the Year Award in 1990.

== See also ==
- 1989 NASCAR Winston Cup Series
- 1989 NASCAR Winston West Series
