= Kenny Burks =

American stock car racing driver

- Born: October 30, 1959 (age 67); Charlottesville, Virginia, U.S.

NASCAR O'Reilly Auto Parts Series career
- 93 races run over 6 years
- Best finish: 14th (1986)
- First race: 1984 Komfort Koach 200 (Rockingham)
- Last race: 1989 Zerex 150 (Martinsville)
Wins	Top tens	Poles
0	10	0

Kenny Burks (born October 30, 1959) is an American former stock car racing driver. Burks competed in 93 NASCAR Busch Series races between 1984 and 1989. Burks achieved a total of ten top-ten finishes throughout his career. His best finish in the points standings was a 14th in 1986.
