= Max Prestwood =

American racing driver

NASCAR O'Reilly Auto Parts Series career
- 43 races run over 5 years
- Best finish: 21st - 1987 (Busch Series)
- First race: 1986 Mountain Dew 400 (Hickory)
- Last race: 1990 Zerex 150 (Martinsville)
| Wins | Top tens | Poles |
|---|---|---|
| 0 | 10 | 0 |
- Statistics up to date as of June 15, 2010.

Max Prestwood Jr. is an American racing driver from Lenoir, North Carolina, who won the NASCAR Weekly Series national championship in 1990. He was a part-time Busch Series competitor from 1986 to 1990.

In 1990, driving two asphalt late models, a family-owned Chevrolet and a Jim Miller-owned Buick, Prestwood won 35 of the 40 races that he entered at Hickory Motor Speedway in North Carolina.
