= Larry Pollard =

Canadian racing driver

- Born: May 5, 1954 (age 72); Victoria, British Columbia, Canada

NASCAR Cup Series career
- 4 races run over 1 year
- Best finish: 107th (1987)
- First race: 1987 Budweiser 500 (Dover)
- Last race: 1987 Holly Farms 400 (North Wilkesboro)
Wins	Top tens	Poles
0	0	0

NASCAR O'Reilly Auto Parts Series career
- 98 races run over 6 years
- Best finish: 9th (1985)
- First race: 1985 Mountain Dew 400 (Hickory)
- Last race: 1990 AC-Delco 200 (Rockingham)
- First win: 1987 Busch 200 (Langley)
Wins	Top tens	Poles
1	38	0

Larry Pollard (born 5 May 1954) is a Canadian former NASCAR Busch Grand National Series driver. During his career, Pollard was the crew chief for NASCAR drivers Richard Petty and Phil Parsons during the 1980s before starting his Busch Series racing career in 1985. As a racecar driver, Pollard became the first non-American driver to win a Busch Grand National event after his win during the 1987 Busch 200 at Langley Speedway. Pollard was inducted into the Victoria Auto Racing Hall of Fame in 2003.

== Early life ==
Pollard was born on 5 May 1954 in Victoria, British Columbia.

== Career ==
Pollard began his racing career as a stock car racer in Victoria during the 1970s. At the beginning of the 1980s, Pollard became a NASCAR pit crew member in the Winston West Series for driver Roy Smith. After two years with Smith, Pollard went to the Busch Grand National Series and continued his pit crew career for Ricky Rudd in 1982. Between 1982 and 1984, Pollard was a pit crew chief for Richard Petty before ending his crew chief career with Phil Parsons in 1985.

As a NASCAR driver, Pollard competed in the Busch Grand National Series from 1985 to 1990 while appearing in four races during the 1987 NASCAR Winston Cup Series season. While in the Busch Series, he won the 1987 Busch 200 at Langley Speedway and became the first non-American driver to win a Busch Series event. At the 1988 Budweiser 200 at Dover International Speedway, Pollard crashed into a wall during the 195th lap and acquired a basilar skull fracture. After coming out of a coma, Pollard returned to racing during the 1989 NASCAR Busch Series. After Pollard's final Busch Series race in 1990, Pollard briefly drove in the NASCAR AutoZone Elite Division, Southeast Series during the early 1990s and the Pro All Stars Series in the mid 2000s.

== Awards and honours ==
In 2003, Pollard was inducted into the Victoria Auto Racing Hall of Fame.

== Motorsports career results ==
=== NASCAR ===
(key) (Bold – Pole position awarded by qualifying time. Italics – Pole position earned by points standings or practice time. * – Most laps led.)

==== Winston Cup Series ====
NASCAR Winston Cup Series results
Year	Team	No.	Make	1	2	3	4	5	6	7	8	9	10	11	12	13	14	15	16	17	18	19	20	21	22	23	24	25	26	27	28	29	NWCC	Pts	Ref
1987	Hamby Racing	12	Chevy	DAY	CAR	RCH	ATL	DAR	NWS	BRI	MAR	TAL	CLT	DOV; 16	POC	RSD	MCH	DAY; 27	POC	TAL	GLN	MCH	BRI	DAR				NWS; 23	CLT	CAR	RSD	ATL	107th	-	
1987	Hamby Racing	12	Olds																						RCH; 13	DOV	MAR						107th	-	

=== ARCA Talladega SuperCar Series ===
(key) (Bold – Pole position awarded by qualifying time. Italics – Pole position earned by points standings or practice time. * – Most laps led.)

ARCA Talladega SuperCar Series results
Year	Team	No.	Make	1	2	3	4	5	6	7	8	9	10	11	12	13	14	ATSCSC	Pts	Ref
1985		98	Chevy	ATL	DAY	ATL	TAL	ATL	SSP	IRP	CSP	FRS	IRP; 22	OEF	ISF	DSF	TOL	118th	-	
