= NASCAR Busch Grand National Series at Louisville Motor Speedway =

Granger Select 200
NASCAR Busch Grand National Series
- Venue: Louisville Motor Speedway
- Location: Louisville, Kentucky
- First race: 1988
- Last race: 1989
- Distance: 70.8 mi (113.9 km)
- Laps: 200

Circuit information
- Length: .354 mi (0.570 km)
- Turns: 4

The Granger Select 200 was a NASCAR Busch Grand National Series race held at the Louisville Motor Speedway in Louisville, Kentucky. First run in 1988, it was last run as part of the 1989 season.

== Past winners ==
Year	Date	Driver	Team	Manufacturer	Race Distance		Race Time	Average Speed (mph)	Report	Ref
Year	Date	Driver	Team	Manufacturer	Laps	Miles (km)	Race Time	Average Speed (mph)	Report	Ref
1988	June 25	Tommy Ellis	J&J Racing	Buick	200	70.8 (113.942)	1:11:18	63.217	Report	
1989	June 24	Tommy Houston	Steve Arndt	Buick	200	70.8 (113.942)	1:08:14	62.256	Report	
