= NASCAR Busch Series at Orange County Speedway =

NASCAR Busch Series stock car race

NASCAR Busch Series
- Venue: Orange County Speedway
- Corporate sponsor: Pantry Stores
- First race: 1983
- Last race: 1994
- Distance: 113 miles (181.9 km)
- Laps: 300
- Previous names: L.D. Swain & Son 200 (1983–1984); Mason Day Paving 200 (1983–1984); Mello Yello 200 (1983); Solomon Enterprises 200 (1983); Miller 200 (1984); Puryear Truck 150 (1985); Goody's 150 (1985); Poole Equipment 150 (1986–1988); L.D. Swain 150 (1986); Roses Stores 150 (1986, 1988); Carpenter Chevy 150 (1987); Roses Stores 200 (1989–1990); Texas Pete 200 (1989–1990); Roses Stores 300 (1991–1993); Texas Pete 300 (1991–1992); Polaroid 300 (1993)

Stock car races in the now-NASCAR O'Reilly Auto Parts Series were held at Orange County Speedway in Rougemont, North Carolina between 1983 and 1994.

== Past winners ==
The NASCAR Busch Grand National Series (now O'Reilly Auto Parts Series) had 27 races at the speedway from 1983 until 1994.

Date	Race Name	Winning driver	Make	Average speed	Race length
June 18, 1983	L.D. Swain & Son 200	Jack Ingram	Pontiac	73.55 mph (118.37 km/h)	75 miles (121 km)
July 2, 1983	Mason Day Paving 200	Tommy Houston	Chevrolet	69.32 mph (111.56 km/h)	75 miles (121 km)
July 9, 1983	Mello Yello 200	Tommy Houston	Chevrolet	79.83 mph (128.47 km/h)	75 miles (121 km)
October 1, 1983	Solomon Enterprises 200	Sam Ard	Oldsmobile	77.08 mph (124.05 km/h)	75 miles (121 km)
April 21, 1984	Mason Day Paving 200	Jack Ingram	Pontiac	79.69 mph (128.25 km/h)	75 miles (121 km)
June 6, 1984	L.D. Swain & Son 200	Jack Ingram	Pontiac	74.18 mph (119.38 km/h)	75 miles (121 km)
July 7, 1984	Miller 200	Jack Ingram	Pontiac	69.23 mph (111.41 km/h)	75 miles (121 km)
June 15, 1985	Puryear Truck 150	Larry Pearson	Pontiac	71.66 mph (115.33 km/h)	56 miles (90 km)
September 28, 1985	Goody's 150	Jack Ingram	Pontiac	70.73 mph (113.83 km/h)	56 miles (90 km)
June 14, 1986	Poole Equipment 150	Tommy Houston	Buick	84.40 mph (135.83 km/h)	56 miles (90 km)
August 16, 1986	L.D. Swain 150	Dale Jarrett	Pontiac	52.56 mph (84.59 km/h)	56 miles (90 km)
September 28, 1986	Roses Stores 150	Larry Pearson	Pontiac	65.98 mph (106.18 km/h)	56 miles (90 km)
June 27, 1987	Poole Equipment 150	Mark Martin	Ford	64.88 mph (104.41 km/h)	56 miles (90 km)
August 15, 1987	Carpenter Chevy 150	Larry Pearson	Chevrolet	62.48 mph (100.55 km/h)	56 miles (90 km)
June 11, 1988	Roses Stores 150	Tommy Houston	Buick	84.83 mph (136.52 km/h)	56 miles (90 km)
August 13, 1988	Poole Equipment 150	Rick Mast	Buick	48.84 mph (78.60 km/h)	56 miles (90 km)
June 10, 1989	Roses Stores 200	Jimmy Spencer	Buick	72.06 mph (115.97 km/h)	75 miles (121 km)
August 12, 1989	Texas Pete 200	Robert Pressley	Oldsmobile	67.55 mph (108.71 km/h)	75 miles (121 km)
June 9, 1990	Roses Stores 200	Chuck Bown	Pontiac	65.98 mph (106.18 km/h)	75 miles (121 km)
August 11, 1990	Texas Pete 200	Chuck Bown	Pontiac	82.72 mph (133.12 km/h)	75 miles (121 km)
June 8, 1991	Roses Stores 300	Robert Pressley	Oldsmobile	72.53 mph (116.73 km/h)	113 miles (182 km)
August 10, 1991	Texas Pete 300	Jimmy Hensley	Oldsmobile	77.04 mph (123.98 km/h)	113 miles (182 km)
June 6, 1992	Roses Stores 300	Robert Pressley	Oldsmobile	66.94 mph (107.73 km/h)	113 miles (182 km)
August 8, 1992	Texas Pete 300	Jimmy Spencer	Oldsmobile	78.72 mph (126.69 km/h)	113 miles (182 km)
May 1, 1993	Roses Stores 300	Ward Burton	Buick	68.03 mph (109.48 km/h)	113 miles (182 km)
October 2, 1993	Polaroid 300	Hermie Sadler	Oldsmobile	60.59 mph (97.51 km/h)	113 miles (182 km)
April 30, 1994	Pantry Stores 300	Hermie Sadler	Chevrolet	70.29 mph (113.12 km/h)	113 miles (182 km)

=== Multiple winners (drivers) ===
# Wins	Driver	Years won
5	Jack Ingram	1983 (1 of 4), 1984 (3 of 3), 1985 (1 of 2)
4	Tommy Houston	1983 (2 of 4), 1986 (1 of 3), 1988 (1 of 2)
3	Larry Pearson	1985 (1 of 2), 1986 (1 of 3), 1987 (1 of 2)
3	Robert Pressley	1989 (1 of 2), 1991 (1 of 2), 1992 (1 of 2)
2	Chuck Bown	1990 (2 of 2)
2	Jimmy Spencer	1989 (1 of 2), 1992 (1 of 2)
2	Hermie Sadler	1993 (1 of 2), 1994

=== Manufacturer wins ===
# Wins	Make	Years won
10	(United States) Pontiac	1983 (1 of 4), 1984 (3 of 3), 1985 (2 of 2), 1986 (2 of 3), 1990 (2 of 2)
7	(United States) Oldsmobile	1983 (1 of 4), 1989 (1 of 2), 1991 (2 of 2), 1992 (2 of 2), 1993 (1 of 2)
5	(United States) Buick	1986 (1 of 3), 1988 (2 of 2), 1989 (1 of 2), 1993 (1 of 2)
4	(United States) Chevrolet	1983 (2 of 4), 1987 (1 of 2), 1994
1	(United States) Ford	1987 (1 of 2)

=== Notable races ===
- 1986 L.D. Swain 150 - Dale Jarrett earned his first ever win in a NASCAR major series.
- 1986 Roses Stores 150 - This was Larry Pearson's only win on his way to his first Busch Championship. Also future Busch series Champion, Rob Moroso, made his NASCAR debut on his 18th birthday.
- 1987 Poole Equipment 150 - Mark Martin won the event, giving Ford its first and only Busch Series win at the track.
- 1989 Roses Stores 200 - Jimmy Spencer was dominant in the event driving a white sponsor-less #34 Buick. Spencer lead 190 of the 200 laps and lapped the field on his way to the win.
- 1990 Roses Stores 200 - This was the first live televised Busch race at Orange County Speedway. Jeff Burton got his first pole in the Busch Series, while Chuck Bown lead 106 laps on the way for the victory.
- 1991 Roses Stores 300 - Jeff Gordon earned his first career Busch series pole in this event. Shawna Robinson made her first career start as Robert Pressley took the win.
- 1991 Texas Pete 300 - Jimmy Hensley lapped the field on the way to victory. To date, this is the last time anyone lapped the field in a Busch Series race. Jack Ingram withdrew from this race after his son was killed the week before. Ingram never raced again in the Busch series.
- 1994 Pantry Stores 300 - The last Busch series race at Orange County Speedway. Some confusion arose at the end of the race on who had won. With two laps to go George Crenshaw blew his engine and poured oil on the track. Two of the leaders, Hermie Sadler and 3rd place Ricky Craven, got into the oil and spun out. Sadler recovered, but was passed for the lead by Dennis Setzer, who had moved into 2nd place, and took the white flag as the caution was displayed. NASCAR determined that Sadler had already taken the caution flag, declaring Sadler as the winner.
