= Harry Gant =

American racing driver (born 1940)

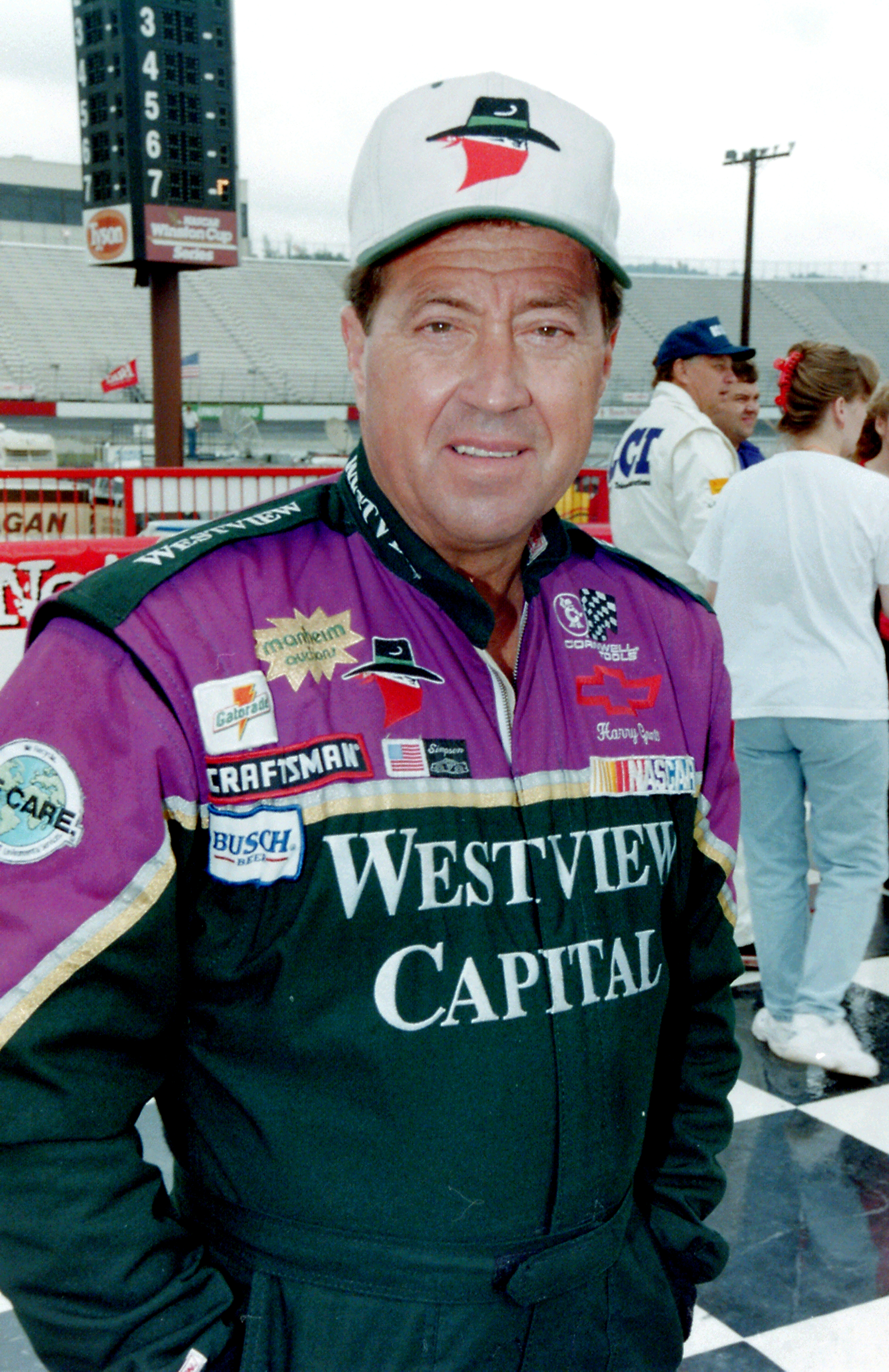
- Gant in 1996 at North Wilkesboro Speedway
- Born: Harold Phil Gant; January 10, 1940 (age 86); Taylorsville, North Carolina, U.S.
- Achievements: 1985 IROC Champion; 1984, 1991 Southern 500 Winner; 1991 Winston 500 Winner
- Awards: 1991 National Motorsports Press Association Driver of the Year; Named one of NASCAR's 50 Greatest Drivers (1998); National Motorsports Press Association Hall of Fame (2003); International Motorsports Hall of Fame Inductee (2006); Named one of NASCAR's 75 Greatest Drivers (2023); NASCAR Hall of Fame (2026); Oldest driver to win a NASCAR Cup race

NASCAR Cup Series career
- 474 races run over 22 years
- Best finish: 2nd (1984)
- First race: 1973 National 500 (Charlotte)
- Last race: 1994 Hooters 500 (Atlanta)
- First win: 1982 Virginia National Bank 500 (Martinsville)
- Last win: 1992 Champion Spark Plug 400 (Michigan)
Wins	Top tens	Poles
18	208	17

NASCAR O'Reilly Auto Parts Series career
- 128 races run over 11 years
- Best finish: 19th (1988, 1992)
- First race: 1982 Goody's 300 (Daytona)
- Last race: 1994 AC Delco 200 (Rockingham)
- First win: 1982 Mello Yello 300 (Charlotte)
- Last win: 1994 Busch Light 300 (Atlanta)
Wins	Top tens	Poles
21	71	14

NASCAR FedEx Freight Truck Series career
- 11 races run over 1 year
- Best finish: 24th (1996)
- First race: 1996 Coca-Cola 200 (Bristol)
- Last race: 1996 Carquest 420K (Las Vegas)
Wins	Top tens	Poles
0	4	0
- Statistics up to date as of December 18, 2012.

Harold Phil Gant (born January 10, 1940) is an American former stock car racing driver best known for driving the No. 33 Skoal Bandit car on the NASCAR Winston Cup Series circuit during the 1980s and 1990s. Gant won 39 NASCAR races combined between the Cup Series and Busch Series, and had a four-race win streak on the Cup circuit in 1991. Gant had a best result of second in the points championship in 1984.

Gant holds the record for the oldest driver to win a Cup Series race (52). He was known for his many nicknames such as "Handsome Harry", "The Bandit", "High Groove Harry", "Hard Luck Harry", and "Mr. September" for his 1991 win streak.

== Nicknames ==
Gant gained a lot of nicknames throughout his racing career. Early on, "Sug" Thompson, announcer at New Asheville Speedway, nicknamed Harry "The Taylorsville Flash". He was later known as "Handsome Harry Gant" due to his Hollywood-style good looks, the "Bandit" after his longtime sponsor Skoal Bandit, "Mr. September" after winning four consecutive Winston Cup races and two Busch Series races in September 1991, "High Groove Harry" after the high line he often took through the corner, and "Hard Luck Harry" for numerous second place finishes in the beginning of his career and later numerous mechanical failures and crashes not of his own doing while leading or running well with Mach I racing.

== Career prior to Winston Cup ==
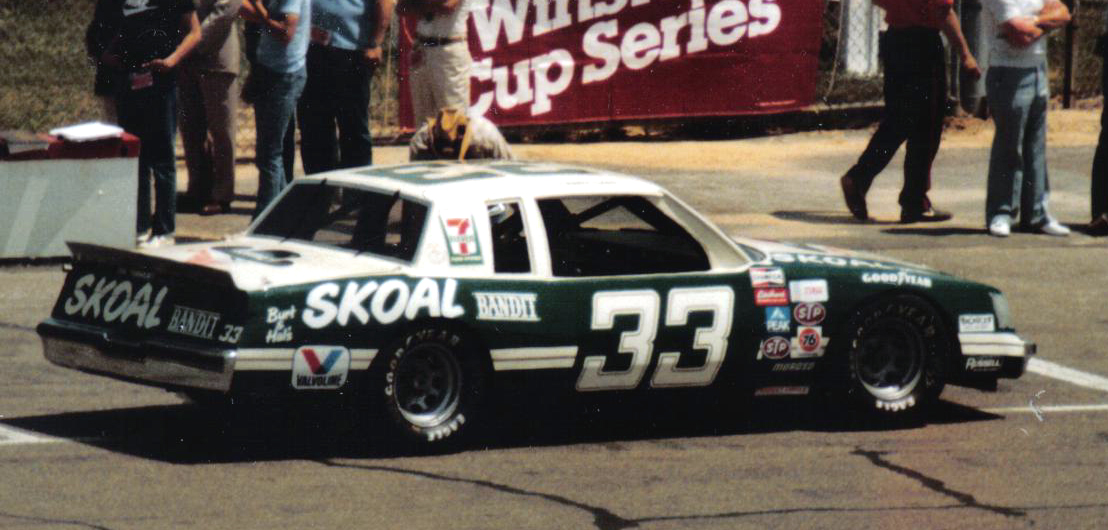
Gant's 1983 racecar

The North Carolina native began his racing career at the old dirt track in Hickory. He built a hobby class car with his friends, and took turns behind the wheel. Gant became the full-time driver and won the track championship. Hickory Speedway was paved in 1967 after Ned Jarrett became the promoter. Gant excelled on the asphalt, and won his first race in the sportsman division.

Gant won over 300 races with the car builder and crew chief Kenneth H. Sigmon, in the NASCAR Sportsman on his way to winning three national championships, in 1972, 1973, and 1974. He finished second three times in the NASCAR Late Model Sportsman Division in 1969, 1976, and 1977. He finished in the top-ten of the final points standing in several other years.

Gant sold half of his construction business in 1979 upon deciding to race full-time in the Winston Cup Series.

== Winston Cup career ==
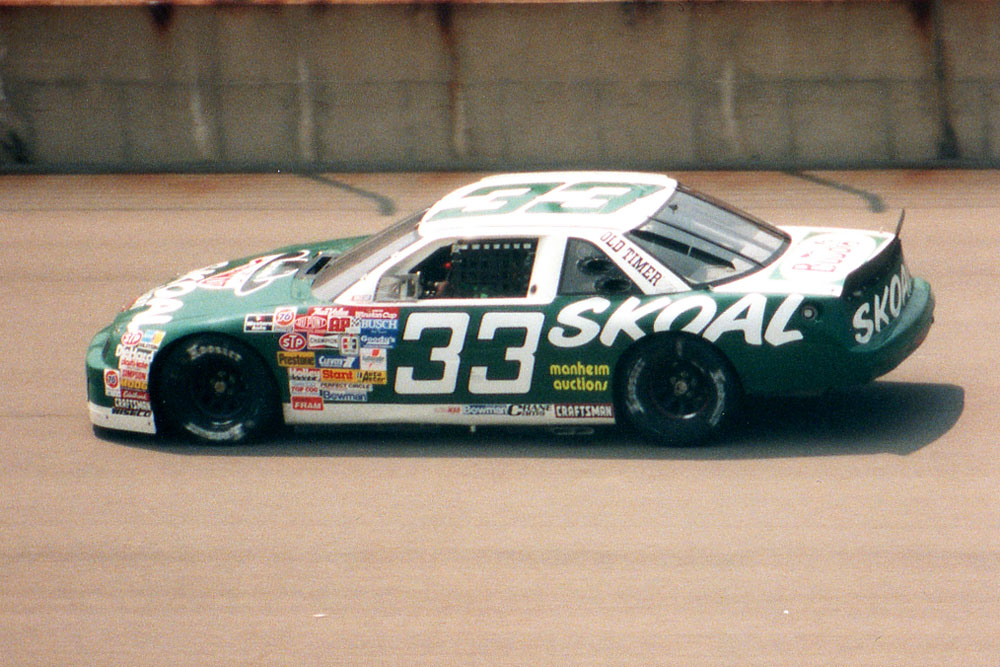
Gant driving in 1994, his final season

Gant made his first Cup start in 1973 at Charlotte Motor Speedway, finishing eleventh in the No. 90 Ford for Donlavey Racing despite initially not being interested in the opportunity. He made six starts over the next four years and had two top-ten finishes. His first full season in Winston Cup was in 1979. He competed for the rookie of the year honors against Dale Earnhardt and Terry Labonte. He finished fourth in the overall rookie battle in the No. 47 Race Hill Farm car for Jack Beebe. He split the next season between the No. 47 and the No. 75 RahMoc Enterprises entry, finishing 21st in points.

After starting out the 1981 season driving for various teams, Gant moved to the No. 33 Skoal Bandit Pontiac, which was owned by Hal Needham and Burt Reynolds, and Leo Jackson after 1988. Gant debuted with the team by placing second at Darlington Raceway, followed by five more second place finishes and three poles, ending the season third in points. He stayed with the team for the rest of his career.

Gant finished second ten times before winning his first Winston Cup race, at Martinsville April 25, 1982, in the Virginia National Bank 500 and he finished 4th in the final points standings. In 1983, Gant only won once at Darlington in the Transouth 400 and collect ten top-fives and sixteen top-ten finishes en route to seventh in the final points standings. In 1984, Gant notched three poles, fifteen top-five finishes, and 23 top-ten finishes and won at Pocono and Martinsville in the fall, he ended up finishing second to eventual Winston Cup champion Terry Labonte. In 1985, Gant won at Martinsville in the spring, and at Dover and at North Wilkesboro in the fall, notching a career best for Gant up to that point. He finished third in championship standings, 259 points behind eventual champion Darrell Waltrip. Gant went winless for three years from 1986-1988 and in 1989, he broke a three-year winless streak winning at Darlington in the spring which caused the veteran driver to exclaim "The Bandit is back" in victory lane. He did not win again in 1989 but finished seventh in the final points standings.

Gant won the International Race of Champions (IROC) championship in 1985. He tied on points with Darrell Waltrip but was awarded the title on tiebreak by finishing higher in the final race: a photo-finish win over Labonte at Michigan International Speedway

Gant drove the No. 33 in the 1985 Talladega NASCAR race with the first telemetry data system ever installed on a race car. The data from the car was sent to the CBS television network and broadcast during the TV coverage of the race.

Gant competed in the 1988 NASCAR Christmas 500 at Australia's Calder Park Thunderdome, finishing third behind fellow Winston Cup drivers Morgan Shepherd and Sterling Marlin.

== 1990s and Mr. September streak ==
Gant entered the decade with a win at Pocono in the spring of 1990. He finished 17th in the final points standings, with six top-fives and nine top-tens.

In 1991, Gant had a career year. He won the 1991 Winston 500 in the spring, gambling on fuel mileage. Fellow competitor Rick Mast drafted behind Gant to give him a push the last few laps but let off in the final laps to preserve the victory. Gant earned the nickname "Mr. September" in 1991 after winning all four September Cup races (Darlington, Richmond, Dover and Martinsville) and two Busch races (Richmond and Dover) at the age of 51. His crew chief was Andy Petree. The four consecutive cup victories tied the modern era record set in 1972. Dominating at the next race at North Wilkesboro Speedway, Gant had his brakes fail, ending his hopes of five consecutive victories. Gant scored five victories in 1991, also notching fifteen top-five finishes and seventeen top-tens, and finishing fourth in the final point standings.

Gant followed up 1991 with a strong 1992 and finished fourth in points again. One of five drivers in contention for the championship, six finishes of thirteenth or worse in the final races doomed his championship hopes. Gant won at Dover in the spring, and he scored his last Cup victory on August 16, 1992, at the Champion Spark Plug 400 at Michigan International Speedway, gambling on fuel. This was also the final victory for Oldsmobile in Cup competition.

Gant and the Leo Jackson team switched to Chevrolets in 1993, and at the end of the season, Gant announced that 1994 would be his last season. Gant finished his career with a pole and seven top-ten finishes, finishing 25th in the final point standings.

In 1996, Gant substituted for the injured Bill Elliott in the 1996 Winston Select, driving Elliott's No. 94 McDonald's Ford Thunderbird after Elliott's injuries at Talladega. Gant also ran a partial season in the Craftsman Truck Series in 1996, driving his own No. 33 Westview Capital Chevrolet C/K. He was inducted into the International Motorsports Hall of Fame on April 27, 2006.

Currently, Gant continues to work on his 300-acre ranch in North Carolina and enjoys riding his motorcycle. In 2015, he was in attendance at Darlington for the Southern 500 to take part in the retro weekend. He also still works on roofs and carpentry in his spare time. Gant once admitted that he "was a good race-car driver but a great carpenter."

== Cup records ==
Gant holds the record as the oldest driver ever to win a Cup Series race (52 years, 219 days) and as the oldest driver ever to collect his first career Cup victory (42 years and 105 days). He is the second oldest driver to win in NASCAR's second-level circuit, now known as the Xfinity Series, after Dick Trickle. In his career he collected eighteen Cup wins and one runner-up finish in 1984 and third in 1981 and 1985, 21 Busch Series wins, and three runner-up finishes in the Busch Series championship (69, 76, and 77). In 1985, he won the IROC title. He won four races in a row in 1991 tying a "new era" (1972–present) record and came in second in the fifth race. His five Winston Cup and five Busch Grand National wins in 1991 made him the only driver, at that time, to post the most wins in both series in the same year, although he tied with Davey Allison with five Cup wins (Allison also scored a victory in the non-points All-Star Race).

== Movie appearances ==
Gant appeared in the 1983 Burt Reynolds movie Stroker Ace. He also gave a short interview in the film Days of Thunder and was mentioned for spinning out in the Daytona 500 late in the movie (although it was actually the No. 26 of Brett Bodine). He also appeared as a mob henchman in the 1984 movie Cannonball Run II. His line in the film was "Better not let the boss hear you say that."

== Motorsports career results ==
=== NASCAR ===
(key) (Bold – Pole position awarded by qualifying time. Italics – Pole position earned by points standings or practice time. * – Most laps led.)

==== Winston Cup Series ====
NASCAR Winston Cup Series results
Year	Team	No.	Make	1	2	3	4	5	6	7	8	9	10	11	12	13	14	15	16	17	18	19	20	21	22	23	24	25	26	27	28	29	30	31	NWCC	Pts	Ref
1973	Donlavey Racing	90	Ford	RSD	DAY	RCH	CAR	BRI	ATL	NWS	DAR	MAR	TAL	NSV	CLT	DOV	TWS	RSD	MCH	DAY	BRI	ATL	TAL	NSV	DAR	RCH	DOV	NWS	MAR	CLT; 11	CAR				85th	-	
1974	Donlavey Racing	90	Ford	RSD	DAY	RCH	CAR	BRI	ATL	DAR	NWS; 9	MAR	TAL	NSV	DOV																				64th	10.3	
1974	Faustina Racing	5	Dodge													CLT; 14	RSD	MCH	DAY	BRI	NSV	ATL	POC	TAL	MCH	DAR	RCH	DOV	NWS	MAR	CLT; 35	CAR	ONT		64th	10.3	
1975	Neil Castles	06	Chevy	RSD	DAY	RCH	CAR	BRI	ATL	NWS	DAR	MAR	TAL	NSV	DOV	CLT; 31	RSD	MCH	DAY	NSV	POC	TAL	MCH	DAR	DOV	NWS	MAR	CLT	RCH	CAR	BRI	ATL	ONT		104th	70	
1976	Frasson Racing	18	Chevy	RSD	DAY	CAR	RCH	BRI	ATL	NWS	DAR	MAR	TAL	NSV	DOV	CLT; 9	RSD	MCH	DAY	NSV	POC	TAL	MCH	BRI	DAR	RCH	DOV	MAR	NWS	CLT	CAR	ATL	ONT		84th	138	
1977	Sherrill Enterprises	6	Chevy	RSD	DAY	RCH	CAR	ATL	NWS	DAR	BRI	MAR	TAL	NSV	DOV	CLT; 30	RSD	MCH	DAY	NSV	POC	TAL	MCH	BRI	DAR	RCH	DOV	MAR	NWS	CLT	CAR	ATL	ONT		101st	73	
1978	Ray Emerson	66	Buick	RSD	DAY; 41	RCH	CAR	ATL	BRI	DAR	NWS	MAR	TAL	DOV																					53rd	325	
1978	Kennie Childers Racing	12	Chevy												CLT; 36	NSV	RSD	MCH	DAY	NSV	POC	TAL	MCH	BRI	DAR	RCH	DOV	MAR; 28	NWS	CLT; 19	CAR	ATL; 7	ONT		53rd	325	
1979	Kennie Childers Racing	12	Chevy	RSD; 10		CAR; 26	RCH	ATL	NWS																										21st	2664	
1979	Kennie Childers Racing	12	Olds		DAY; 33																														21st	2664	
1979	Race Hill Farm Team	47	Olds							BRI; 21	DAR		TAL; 39							DAY; 7													ATL; 11		21st	2664	
1979	Race Hill Farm Team	47	Chevy									MAR; 6		NSV; 28	DOV; 25	CLT; 23	TWS	RSD	MCH; 17		NSV; 22	**POC**; 15	TAL; 7	MCH; 25	BRI; 16	DAR; 12	RCH; 9	DOV; 28	MAR; 12	CLT; 20	NWS; 14	CAR; 21		ONT; 20	21st	2664	
1980	RahMoc Enterprises	75	Olds	RSD; 12																															11th	3703	
1980	Race Hill Farm Team	47	Olds		DAY; 42								TAL; 37							DAY; 16			TAL; 5												11th	3703	
1980	Race Hill Farm Team	47	Chevy			RCH; 12	CAR; 8	ATL; 16	BRI; 7	DAR; 3	NWS; 2	MAR; 21		NSV; 9	DOV; 4	CLT; 28			MCH; 28		NSV; 29	POC; 5		MCH; 37	BRI; 14	DAR; 3	RCH; 20	DOV; 2*	NWS; 4	MAR; 29	CLT; 16	CAR; 2	ATL; 36	ONT; 41	11th	3703	
1980	RahMoc Enterprises	75	Chevy														TWS; 8	RSD; 7																	11th	3703	
1981	Hamby Racing	17	Chevy	RSD; 15																															3rd	4210	
1981	Race Hill Farm Team	47	Buick		DAY; 23	RCH; 6	CAR; 18	ATL; 2																											3rd	4210	
1981	Hylton Motorsports	48	Pontiac						BRI; 8																										3rd	4210	
1981	Kennie Childers Racing	12	Olds							NWS; 5		MAR; 4*		NSV; 22																					3rd	4210	
1981	Mach 1 Racing	33	Pontiac								DAR; 2		TAL; 34				TWS; 10		MCH; 2		NSV; 8	POC; 4		MCH; 4	BRI; 11	**DAR**; 14	RCH; 2	DOV; 23	MAR; 2*	NWS; 24	CLT; 41	CAR; 3	**ATL**; 20	RSD; 8	3rd	4210	
1981	Mach 1 Racing	33	Chevy												DOV; 16	CLT; 2		RSD; 31																	3rd	4210	
1981	Mach 1 Racing	33	Buick																	DAY; 2			**TAL**; 4												3rd	4210	
1982	Mach 1 Racing	33	Buick	DAY; 7	RCH; 30	BRI; 6	ATL; 5	CAR; 8	DAR; 19	NWS; 6	MAR; 1*	TAL; 14	NSV; 29		CLT; 13	POC; 4	RSD; 35	MCH; 10	DAY; 24	NSV; 3	POC; 22	TAL; 38	MCH; 3	BRI; 3	DAR; 11	RCH; 7	DOV; 12	NWS; 2	**CLT**; 1	MAR; 8	CAR; 32	ATL; 2	RSD; 26		4th	3877	
1982	Mach 1 Racing	33	Pontiac											DOV; 30																					4th	3877	
1983	Mach 1 Racing	33	Buick	DAY; 37	RCH; 5	CAR; 5	ATL; 11	DAR; 1	NWS; 3	MAR; 2	TAL; 4	NSV; 3	DOV; 9	BRI; 27	CLT; 25	RSD; 3	POC; 18	MCH; 8	DAY; 11	NSV; 8	POC; 5	TAL; 5	MCH; 30	BRI; 6	DAR; 22	RCH; 20	DOV; 17	MAR; 8	NWS; 9	CLT; 29	CAR; 23	ATL; 37	RSD; 31		7th	3790	
1984	Mach 1 Racing	33	Chevy	DAY; 6	RCH; 8	**CAR**; 24	ATL; 6	BRI; 23	NWS; 2	DAR; 6	MAR; 13	TAL; 2	NSV; 16	DOV; 27*	**CLT**; 4	RSD; 29	POC; 2	MCH; 4	DAY; 2	NSV; 9	POC; 1*	TAL; 7	MCH; 4	BRI; 5	**DAR**; 1*	RCH; 9	DOV; 1*	MAR; 4	CLT; 4	NWS; 2	CAR; 2*	ATL; 26	RSD; 8		2nd	4443	
1985	Mach 1 Racing	33	Chevy	DAY; 26	RCH; 5	CAR; 2*	ATL; 24	**BRI**; 20	DAR; 14	NWS; 10	MAR; 1*	TAL; 38	DOV; 2	CLT; 2	RSD; 2	POC; 2	MCH; 16	DAY; 24	POC; 5	TAL; 7	MCH; 3	BRI; 6	DAR; 21	RCH; 6	DOV; 1*	MAR; 3	NWS; 1*	**CLT**; 24*	CAR; 3	**ATL**; 8	RSD; 4				3rd	4033	
1986	Mach 1 Racing	33	Chevy	DAY; 30	RCH; 28	CAR; 2	ATL; 12	BRI; 4	DAR; 14	NWS; 7	MAR; 25	TAL; 21	DOV; 14*	CLT; 4	RSD; 9	POC; 26	MCH; 2*	DAY; 31	**POC**; 30	TAL; 22	GLN; 34	MCH; 8	BRI; 5	DAR; 27	**RCH**; 7	DOV; 35	MAR; 3	NWS; 5	CLT; 2	CAR; 4	ATL; 28	RSD; 37			11th	3498	
1987	Mach 1 Racing	33	Chevy	DAY; 31	CAR; 29	RCH; 25	ATL; 34	DAR; 7	NWS; 11	**BRI**; 6	MAR; 27	TAL; 29	CLT; 24	DOV; 30	POC; 32	RSD; 25	MCH; 13	DAY; 9	POC; 30	TAL; 31	GLN; 18	MCH; 26	BRI; 8	DAR; 39	RCH; 25	DOV; 25	MAR; 14	NWS; 31	CLT; 33	CAR; 13	RSD; 28	ATL; 24			22nd	2725	
1988	Mach 1 Racing	33	Chevy	DAY; 29	RCH; 28	CAR; 28	ATL; 21	DAR; 38	BRI; 18	NWS; 12	MAR; 26	TAL; 36	CLT; 30	DOV	RSD	POC	MCH	DAY	POC; 10	TAL; 16	GLN; 31	MCH; 21	BRI; 6	DAR; 40	RCH; 32	DOV; 11	MAR; 30	CLT; 24	NWS; 30	CAR; 7	PHO; 12	ATL; 30			27th	2266	
1989	Jackson Bros. Motorsports	33	Olds	DAY; 12	CAR; 31	ATL; 29	RCH; 14	DAR; 1*	BRI; 10	NWS; 23	MAR; 12	TAL; 7	CLT; 40	DOV; 23	SON; 12	POC; 2	MCH; 32	DAY; 32	POC; 5	TAL; 8	GLN; 19	MCH; 3	BRI; 4	DAR; 6	RCH; 5	DOV; 38	MAR; 2	CLT; 2	NWS; 4	CAR; 29	PHO; 8	ATL; 17			7th	3610	
1990	Leo Jackson Motorsports	33	Olds	DAY; 18	RCH; 36	CAR; 11	ATL; 9	DAR; 6	BRI	NWS; 13	MAR; 26	TAL; 36	CLT; 25	DOV; 34	SON; 19	POC; 1	MCH; 5	DAY; 7	POC; 14	TAL; 15	GLN; 21	MCH; 13	BRI; 26	DAR; 5	RCH; 36	DOV; 4	MAR; 5	NWS; 28	CLT; 26	CAR; 3	PHO; 37	ATL; 19			17th	3182	
1991	Leo Jackson Motorsports	33	Olds	DAY; 25	RCH; 3	CAR; 3	ATL; 19	DAR; 27	BRI; 11	NWS; 23	MAR; 5	TAL; 1	CLT; 4	DOV; 3	SON; 27	POC; 4	MCH; 10	DAY; 23	POC; 26	TAL; 39	GLN; 28	MCH; 6	BRI; 19	DAR; 1*	RCH; 1	DOV; 1*	MAR; 1*	**NWS**; 2*	CLT; 4	CAR; 2*	PHO; 23	ATL; 4			4th	3985	
1992	Leo Jackson Motorsports	33	Olds	DAY; 12	CAR; 3	RCH; 3	ATL; 2	DAR; 2	BRI; 29	NWS; 5	MAR; 5	TAL; 24	CLT; 5	DOV; 1	SON; 17	POC; 23	MCH; 7	DAY; 23	POC; 2	TAL; 17	GLN; 18	MCH; 1	BRI; 26	DAR; 16*	RCH; 8	DOV; 6	MAR; 19	NWS; 13	CLT; 8	CAR; 6	PHO; 14	ATL; 13			4th	3955	
1993	Leo Jackson Motorsports	33	Chevy	DAY; 21	CAR; 31	RCH; 9	ATL; 21	DAR; 37	BRI; 28	NWS; 13	MAR; 31	TAL; 23	SON; 19	CLT; 18	DOV; 7	POC; 3	MCH; 10	DAY; 21	NHA; 17	POC; 9	TAL; 8	GLN; 10	MCH; 30	BRI; 4	DAR; 7	RCH; 11	DOV; 5	MAR; 33	NWS; 6	CLT; 12	CAR; 4	PHO; 12	**ATL**; 28		11th	3524	
1994	Leo Jackson Motorsports	33	Chevy	DAY; 34	CAR; 37	RCH; 34	ATL; 30	DAR; 8	BRI; 37	NWS; 8	MAR; DNQ	TAL; 23	SON; 10	CLT; 7	DOV; 42	POC; 16	MCH; 35	DAY; 31	NHA; 17	POC; 38	TAL; 21	IND; 37	GLN; 10	MCH; 25	**BRI**; 9	DAR; 41	RCH; 22	DOV; 13	MAR; 8	NWS; 32	CLT; 22	CAR; 31	PHO; 23	ATL; 33	25th	2720	

===== Daytona 500 =====
Year	Team	Manufacturer	Start	Finish
1978	Ray Emerson	Buick	20	41
1979	Kennie Childers Racing	Oldsmobile	14	33
1980	Race Hill Farm Team	Oldsmobile	10	42
1981	Race Hill Farm Team	Buick	31	23
1982	Mach 1 Racing	Buick	2	7
1983	Mach 1 Racing	Buick	13	37
1984	Mach 1 Racing	Chevrolet	6	6
1985	Mach 1 Racing	Chevrolet	10	26
1986	Mach 1 Racing	Chevrolet	15	30
1987	Mach 1 Racing	Chevrolet	12	31
1988	Mach 1 Racing	Chevrolet	20	29
1989	Jackson Bros. Motorsports	Oldsmobile	12	12
1990	Leo Jackson Motorsports	Oldsmobile	5	18
1991	Leo Jackson Motorsports	Oldsmobile	11	25
1992	Leo Jackson Motorsports	Oldsmobile	11	12
1993	Leo Jackson Motorsports	Chevrolet	37	21
1994	Leo Jackson Motorsports	Chevrolet	36	34

==== Busch Series ====
NASCAR Busch Series results
Year	Team	No.	Make	1	2	3	4	5	6	7	8	9	10	11	12	13	14	15	16	17	18	19	20	21	22	23	24	25	26	27	28	29	30	31	32	33	34	35	NBSC	Pts	Ref
1982	Harry Gant	77	Pontiac	DAY; 6	RCH	BRI	MAR	**DAR**; 14	HCY	SBO	CRW	RCH	LGY	**DOV**; 15	HCY	**CLT**; 1	ASH	HCY	SBO	CAR	CRW	SBO	HCY	LGY	IRP	BRI	HCY	RCH	MAR	CLT; DNQ	HCY	MAR							43rd	469	
1983	Johnny Hayes Racing	28	Pontiac	DAY	RCH	CAR	HCY	MAR	NWS	SBO	GPS	LGY	DOV	BRI	CLT; 4	SBO	HCY	ROU	SBO	ROU	CRW	ROU	SBO	HCY	LGY	IRP	GPS	BRI	HCY	DAR	RCH	NWS	SBO	MAR	ROU	CLT	HCY	MAR	102nd	160	
1986	Ingram Racing	11	Pontiac	DAY	CAR	HCY	MAR	BRI	DAR	SBO	LGY	JFC	DOV	CLT	SBO	HCY	ROU	IRP	SBO	RAL	OXF	SBO	HCY	LGY	ROU	BRI	DAR	RCH	DOV	MAR; 8	ROU	CLT	CAR	MAR					109th	-	
1987	Whitaker Racing	7	Buick	DAY; 18	HCY	MAR	DAR; 5	BRI; 23	LGY	SBO	CLT; 1	DOV; 24*	IRP	ROU	JFC	OXF	SBO	HCY	RAL	LGY	ROU	BRI; 31	JFC	DAR; 1*	RCH; 7	**DOV**; 24*	MAR; 31	**CLT**; 1	CAR; 30	MAR; 31									26th	1509	
1988	Whitaker Racing	7	Buick	DAY; 8	HCY; 11	CAR; 5	MAR	DAR; 2*	BRI; 8	LNG	NZH	SBO	NSV	CLT; 6	DOV	ROU	LAN	LVL	MYB; 23	OXF	SBO	HCY	LNG	IRP	ROU	BRI; 4	DAR; 1*	**RCH**; 1	**DOV**; 7	MAR; 1	**CLT**; 38	**CAR**; 1	MAR; 1						19th	2238	
1989	Whitaker Racing	7	Buick	DAY; 26	CAR; 11*	MAR; 20	HCY; 6	DAR; 3	BRI; 30	NZH	SBO	LAN	NSV	CLT; 29	**DOV**; 28	ROU	LVL	VOL	MYB	SBO	HCY	DUB	IRP	ROU	BRI; 28	DAR; 1	RCH; 25	DOV; 15	MAR; 26	CLT; 7	CAR; 1*	MAR; 2							20th	1907	
1990	Whitaker Racing	7	Olds	DAY; 2																																			23rd	2134	
1990	Whitaker Racing	7	Buick		RCH; 34	**CAR**; 4	MAR; 28	HCY; 9	DAR; 1*	BRI	LAN	SBO	NZH	HCY; 9	CLT; 3	DOV; 2	ROU	VOL	MYB	OXF	NHA; 2	SBO	DUB	IRP	ROU	BRI	DAR; 2	RCH; 10	DOV; 1*	MAR	CLT; 30	NHA	CAR; 7	MAR					23rd	2134	
1991	Whitaker Racing	7	Buick	DAY; 5	RCH; 1	CAR; 5	MAR; 24*	VOL	HCY	DAR; 40*	BRI; 7	LAN	SBO	NZH	CLT; 3	DOV; 16*	ROU	HCY	MYB	GLN	OXF	NHA	SBO	DUB	IRP	ROU	BRI; 30	**DAR**; 7	RCH; 1	DOV; 1*	CLT; 1	NHA; 3	CAR; 5	MAR; 1*					21st	2309	
1992	Whitaker Racing	7	Buick	DAY; DNQ	CAR	RCH; 1*	ATL; 2	MAR	DAR; 2	BRI; 1*	HCY	LAN	DUB	NZH	CLT	DOV; 17	ROU	MYB	GLN	VOL	NHA						BRI; 22	DAR; 31*	RCH; 9	DOV; 3		MAR; 26	CAR; 5	HCY					19th	1887	
1992	Whitaker Racing	7	Chevy																			TAL; 33	IRP	ROU	MCH; 5	NHA					CLT; 7								19th	1887	
1993	Whitaker Racing	7	Chevy	DAY; 3			DAR; 2	BRI; 26	HCY	ROU	MAR	NZH	CLT; 38	DOV; 31	MYB	GLN	MLW; 29	TAL; 41	IRP	MCH; 13	NHA	BRI; 16	DAR; 32	RCH	DOV; 34	ROU	CLT; 35	MAR	CAR; 29	HCY	ATL; 4								27th	1526	
1993	Whitaker Racing	7	Buick		CAR; 7	RCH; 33																																	27th	1526	
1994	Whitaker Racing	7	Chevy	DAY; 32	CAR; 2	RCH; 3	ATL; 1*	MAR	DAR; 5	HCY	BRI; 7	ROU	NHA	NZH	CLT; 30	DOV; 32	MYB	GLN	MLW; 12	SBO	TAL; 31	HCY	IRP; 32	MCH; 24	**BRI**; 28	DAR; 23	RCH	**DOV**; 2*	CLT; 35	MAR	CAR; 4*								23rd	1939	

==== Craftsman Truck Series ====
NASCAR Craftsman Truck Series results
Year	Team	No.	Make	1	2	3	4	5	6	7	8	9	10	11	12	13	14	15	16	17	18	19	20	21	22	23	24	NCTC	Pts	Ref
1996	Harry Gant	33	Chevy	HOM	PHO	POR	EVG	TUS	CNS	HPT	BRI; 13	NZH; 21	MLW	LVL	I70	IRP; 12	FLM; 8	GLN	NSV; 20	RCH; 8	NHA; 24	MAR; 10	NWS; 31	SON	MMR	PHO; 10	LVS; 21	24th	1267	

=== International Race of Champions ===
(key) (Bold – Pole position. * – Most laps led.)

International Race of Champions results
Year	Make	1	2	3	4	Pos.	Pts	Ref
1985	Chevy	DAY; 5	MOH; 6	TAL; C	MCH; 1*	1st	45	
1986	Chevy	**DAY**; 8*	MOH; 6	TAL; 2	GLN; 11	6th	41	
1992	Dodge	DAY; 2	TAL; 5	MCH; 4	MCH; 6	5th	46.5	
1993	Dodge	DAY; 8	DAR; 3	TAL; 7	MCH; 4	7th	44	

Sporting positions
Preceded by Cale Yarborough	IROC Champion; IROC IX (1985)	Succeeded by Al Unser Jr.
