= Lake Speed =

American racing driver (born 1948)

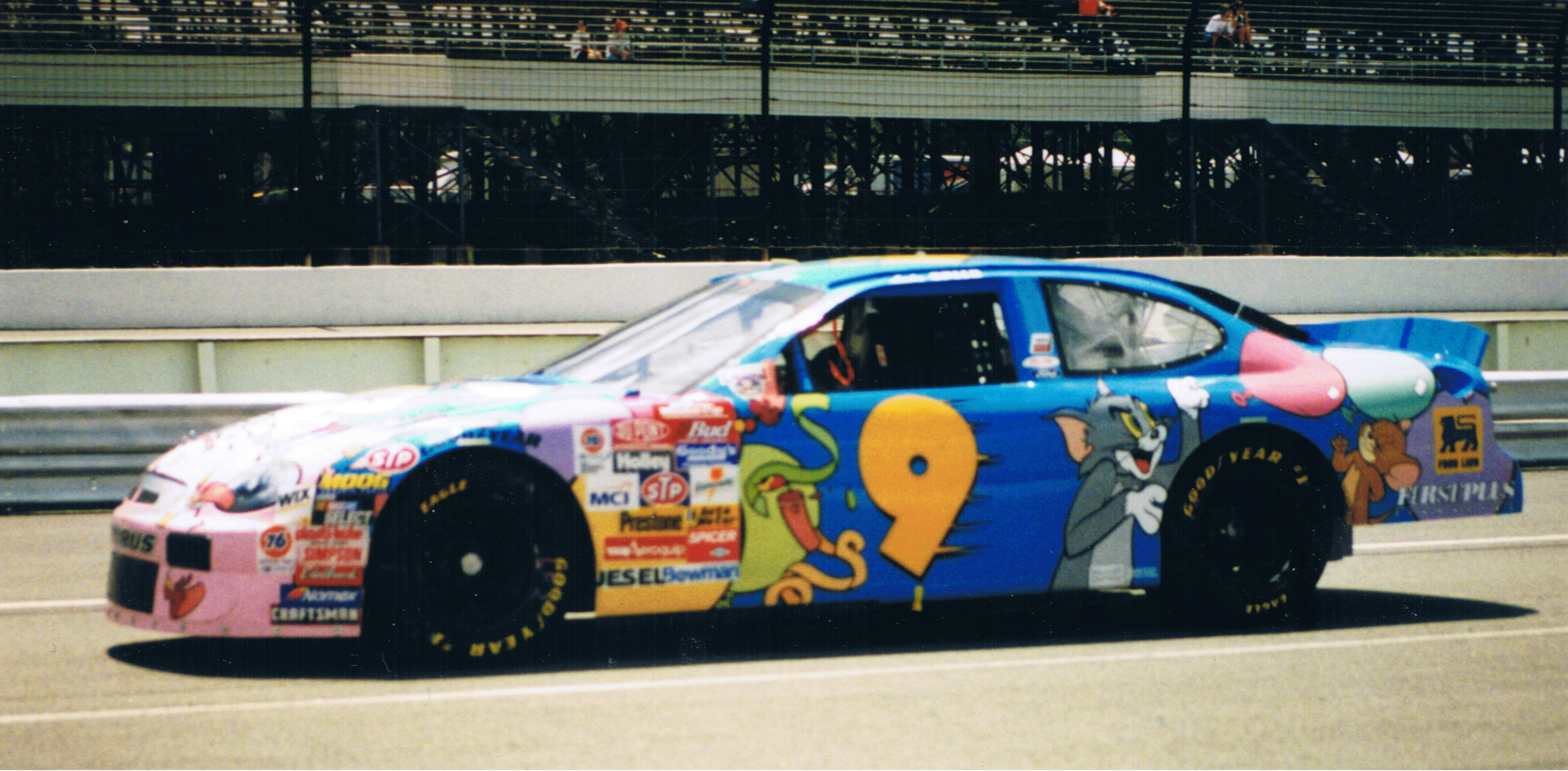
- Speed in the No.9 Cartoon Network Ford in June 1998.
- Born: Lake Chambers Speed; January 17, 1948 (age 78); Jackson, Mississippi, U.S.
- Awards: 6× United States Karting champion 1978 World Karting Champion

NASCAR Cup Series career
- 402 races run over 19 years
- Best finish: 11th (1985)
- First race: 1980 Winston Western 500 (Riverside)
- Last race: 1998 Jiffy Lube 300 (New Hampshire)
- First win: 1988 TranSouth 500 (Darlington)
Wins	Top tens	Poles
1	75	0

NASCAR O'Reilly Auto Parts Series career
- 6 races run over 2 years
- First race: 1983 Miller Time 300 (Charlotte)
- Last race: 1984 Miller Time 300 (Charlotte)
Wins	Top tens	Poles
0	3	0

Lake Chambers Speed (born January 17, 1948) is an American retired stock car racing driver. He formerly competed in the NASCAR Winston Cup Series, scoring one career win in 402 starts.

== Background ==
Lake was named after the best friend of his father, Bob Lake. Lake's father, Leland S. Speed, took office as the Mayor of Jackson, Mississippi, in 1948, the same year that Lake was born. He started his racing career at the age of thirteen racing karts, much to the displeasure of his family. Over the years, Speed won the International Karting Federation (IKF) National Championship six times and in 1978 at age 30, he won the prestigious Senior Division Karting World Championship over, among others, future three-time Formula One champion Ayrton Senna, who was 18 years old at the time. Speed had been the only American to win the Karting World Championship until 2015 when 14 year-old Logan Sargeant of Florida won the KFJ World Karting Championship.

== NASCAR career ==
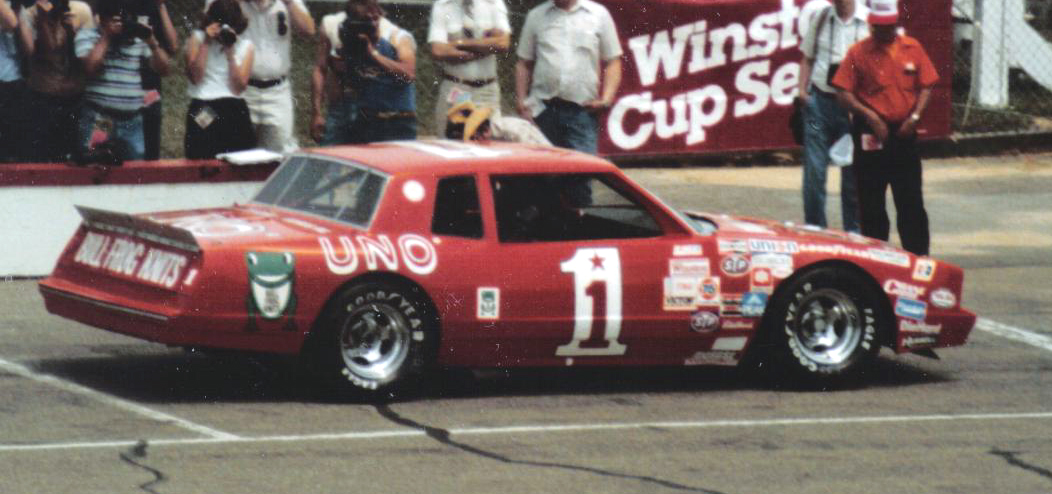
Speed's 1983 Cup car

=== 1980–1984 ===
In 1980 Speed started nineteen races in his rookie year scoring an 8th at Darlington Speedway in his third career start. Speed also scored finishes of 7th at the spring Talladega Superspeedway race, 8th at Talladega's fall event, 7th at Charlotte's fall event and 8th at the season ending race at Ontario Motor Speedway. Speed finished 22nd in overall points and 2nd to Jody Ridley in the rookie of the year standings.

In 1981, Speed again ran his own operation starting 27 of the 31 races on the schedule. Lake was unable to qualify for the 1981 Daytona 500, but did manage to win the thirty-lap consolation race, leading the race from start to finish. He scored a 9th-place finish in both races at Rockingham and at Bristol. He followed that up with a 7th in Martinsville Speedway's spring event, an 8th at the now-defunct Texas World Speedway and a sixth in the late summer Talladega event. Speed's final Top 10 would come at Bristol in August where he finished 7th. The final points tally came up with Speed finishing 18th in points. One special footnote for Speed during the '81 season was that he enabled future NASCAR pace car driver Elmo Langley to start his 536th and final NASCAR race at Dover in the Mason-Dixon 500. Langley started 29th and finished 29th completing only six laps before a driveshaft failure.

1982 was Speed's first full year of competition on the Winston Cup circuit. This time, Speed was driving for the first time for another car owner, Roger Hamby. The beginning of the season was a struggle with Speed not obtaining a top ten finish until the eleventh race, at Dover International Speedway. In July at Daytona, Speed scored his second Top 10 finish with a 9th. Speed continued to struggle as the season wrapped up managing to finish 6th in the Southern 500 at Darlington and 8th at the fall event at the North Wilkesboro Speedway. Speed finished 20th in points.

1983 was a year of major change for Speed. He was now driving for an established owner in Hoss Ellington, however on a limited schedule. The team showed promise early in the season scoring a 4th at Rockingham and a 6th at Darlington. It was at Talladega where Speed's life took a major change. Towards the race's end, Speed was leading the field with a chance to win his first Cup race. He was beaten at the end by Richard Petty and Benny Parsons. After the race, Speed decided to change his life and become a devout Christian. The week after Talladega, Speed scored another Top 10 with a 6th in the World 600 at Charlotte. Speed's final Top 10 of the season was the August Michigan International Speedway race with an 8th-place finish. Speed finished 27th in the points standings.

1984 was much the same. Starting 19 of the series' 30 races, Speed showed some early season strength with a 3rd at Rockingham, a 9th at Atlanta and a 6th at Charlotte. At the first Pocono Raceway race, Speed qualified 2nd and finished 10th following that up with a 5th at Michigan. Speed finished 8th in the late summer Talladega race and had a near win in the Southern 500 starting 2nd and leading 28 laps before he crashed out. Speed's final Top 10 was at Atlanta with a 7th-place finish and 26th in points.

Speed also started six races in the NASCAR Busch Series between 1983 and 1984. He only made one start in 1983, at Charlotte in the Miller Time 300, where he finished 6th. In 1984, Speed lost by two feet to Darrell Waltrip in the season opening Goody's 300 at Daytona, and scored another Top 5 in the Mello Yello 300 at Charlotte. Speed's worst qualifying effort was a 13th-place start in the season opener. Speed's starts were 5th at Darlington, 7th at Charlotte, 3rd at Darlington and 9th at Charlotte.

=== 1985–1989 ===
1985 was Speed's breakout season in NASCAR. Running a full schedule under the RahMoc Enterprises banner, Speed started off the season with a 2nd-place finish to Bill Elliott in the Daytona 500. CBS's pit reporter Mike Joy conducted an interview with Speed after the race, during which the emotional driver repeatedly thanked God for the successful showing. He followed that up with a 10th at Richmond International Raceway and a fourth at Rockingham, taking the points lead early in the season. After an engine problem at Atlanta, Speed scored a string of strong runs: 7th at Bristol, 9th at Darlington, 9th at North Wilkesboro, 8th at Martinsville and 10th at Talladega. Speed then finished 6th in the World 600. The stretch run of the season took its toll on the team and Speed's position in the points fell; however, he continued to post strong runs, finishing 7th at Talladega, 10th at Bristol, 10th at Dover and 7th and 9th-place finishes at Atlanta and Riverside International Raceway to round out the season. Overall, it was Speed's best year in terms of points, notching a 10th-place finish.

Speed started off the 1986 season with a 10th in the Daytona 500 and a 10th at Rockingham but after the fourth race of the season, he was ousted from the ride. Speed started one more race that season, filling in for the ailing Rick Wilson in his Morgan-McClure Motorsports ride at Charlotte finishing 14th. Shortly thereafter, Speed began working again at starting his own race team.

1987 was a building year in many ways. With sponsorship from Wynn's Car Care products, Kmart and Delco Battery, Speed built an entirely new race team with himself as the owner, and veteran crew chief Darrell Bryant helping him to build the operation. The purple and white Oldsmobile donned the number 83, in honor of the year Lake became a born-again Christian. In his thirteen starts Speed finished 8th in the first Talladega race and followed that up with a 3rd-place finish in the World 600. Speed's other two Top 10 finishes were at the same tracks, 7th-place at both Talladega and Charlotte.

The team's strong 1987 performances continued in 1988. With strong support from the Hoosier tire company, Speed ran strong in the Daytona 500 before dropping out due to an engine failure. The next race, at Richmond, Speed ran up front leading 67 laps but finished 6th. The following race, at Rockingham, Speed again showed power, leading 51 laps and finishing 2nd to Neil Bonnett. Speed's first win came March 27 at Darlington in the TranSouth 500. After starting the race eighth, Speed methodically moved his way to the front before eventually taking the lead and running away from the field. Leading 178 of the 367 laps, Speed beat Alan Kulwicki by half a straightaway to secure his first and only NASCAR Winston Cup win. One of the factors in Speed's victory was that he was the only driver who tested the Hoosier tires at Darlington. Where most of his competitors thought that the Hoosiers would blister, Lake and his team believed that they would not.

Speed and Dale Earnhardt race at Bristol in the Busch 500, August 1988

At Dover, Speed finished fourth, following that up with finishes of 9th at Daytona and 5th at Michigan. In the Volunteer 500, Speed led 66 laps and looked like a strong contender for the race win before blowing a right front tire and hitting the wall, effectively ending his day. Speed's last Top 10 came at the 1988 Delaware 500 with a 9th-place effort. The season ended with Speed 17th in the final points rundown.

Speed had strong finishes in 1989 with a Bull's Eye Barbecue Sauce sponsorship Speed said was "worth peanuts." At Rockingham, Lake took 8th and a few weeks later he finished 10th Darlington. Speed finished 5th in the inaugural event at Sears Point (now Sonoma) Raceway and a 7th a few races later at Michigan. However, in the July race at Pocono, Speed was injured in a two-car wreck that also injured driver Greg Sacks. Although Sacks' car overturned, Speed was injured more severely, and missed several races. While Lake recovered from his injuries, he had several drivers drive in his place including Joe Ruttman at Talladega, Michigan and Bristol; Eddie Bierschwale at Watkins Glen; and Rodney Combs at Darlington. Lake returned to action in the Miller High Life 400 at Richmond to finish 14th. At the final race of the 1989 season at Atlanta, Lake was able to conclude a personally disappointing year with a 10th-place run.

=== 1990–1994 ===
In 1990, Speed started only six races with Prestone sponsorship, finishing two of them. The best finish of Lake's abbreviated 1990 season came at Talladega's Die Hard 500 with an 11th-place effort. Speed also fielded cars for short track ace Tommy Ellis and Phil Parsons in two races. Ellis started the Delaware 500 at Dover in 31st and finished 32nd after an engine failure. In the National 500 at Charlotte, Parsons drove Speed's car with Baja Boats sponsorship to an 18th-place run. 1991 was an improvement in terms of races started. Speed replaced Dick Trickle in Cale Yarborough's car but struggled with mechanical failures throughout his stint with the team. In twenty starts, Speed's best finish was an 11th at Bristol in August. In 1992, Speed got back to his own team starting just nine races with Purex as his sponsor. The team suffered several mechanical failures and Speed only managed to have a best finish of 18th in the final two races of the season at Phoenix and Atlanta.

After driving his own car during a handful of races in the 1993 season's first half, Speed was called to drive for Robert Yates Racing, filling in following Davey Allison's death. Speed qualified fourth at Watkins Glen International. He followed that up with a 2nd-place start at Michigan and a 7th-place finish. The next race at Bristol, Speed was running a strong race before contact late with Rick Mast ruined his chances at a top-ten finish. After Bristol, Speed was replaced by Ernie Irvan, but less than a week later, on September 3, it was announced that Speed would drive the No. 15 Ford owned by Bud Moore for 1994, replacing Geoff Bodine, who would depart from Moore's Ford to drive his own team which he purchased following Alan Kulwicki's death. However, two races later at Dover, Speed replaced Bodine in Moore's No. 15, as Ford allowed Bodine to take over Kulwicki's former No. 7 for the last seven races of 1993, in preparation for his first full season as an owner-driver. Speed's best finish for Moore at the end of the 1993 season was an 11th at Charlotte.

Speed remained with Moore for the 1994 season starting off with finishes of 6th at Atlanta, 5th at Darlington and 3rd at Bristol, moving up to 5th-place in the points. Two races later, Speed finished seventh at Talladega. It was during this time that Speed was inducted into the karting hall of fame. Speed would have to wait until the July Daytona race to get another Top 10 finish, a 10th. Speed and the team ran good through the summer stretch, often starting near the rear of the field but moving to the front. Unfortunately, Speed did not manage a Top 10 finish until Dover where he finished 9th. In the final four races, Speed had three great runs: a 5th at Charlotte, a 10th at Rockingham and a 4th at Atlanta where he led 20 laps. It wasn't enough for Speed to finish in the Top 10 in points. He finished 11th behind Bill Elliott.

=== 1995–1998 ===
Speed moved over to Melling Racing team for the 1995 season and resurrected the organization. The normally red and white Melling car now was emblazoned with Spam sponsorship and blue and yellow colors. Speed had two Top 10 runs, at Charlotte in the Coca-Cola 600 and at Darlington in the Southern 500 to finish 23rd in the points rundown. However, the 1995 season provided Speed with what is perhaps his most famous moment. After the Miller Genuine Draft 400, Michael Waltrip blocked Speed's car in the pits. Waltrip, angry over an on-track encounter with Speed, pulled down Speed's window net and began throwing punches at Speed, who was wearing his helmet..The incident was broadcast in front of a live television audience on the CBS network and resulted in a $10,000 fine for Waltrip.

During the 1996 season, Speed earned his first career NASCAR pole, albeit in a non-points event, the Winston Open. At the Miller 400 at Michigan, the normally blue and yellow Spam Ford was graced in red, white and gold in honor of 50 years of Melling's parts company being in operation. Speed and the Melling Racing team notched an 8th-place finish at Pocono in the Miller 500. Speed stunned everyone in qualifying for the Brickyard 400 at Indianapolis with a 3rd-place effort. During the race, Speed made a daring three-wide pass to take the lead. The finishing order saw Speed finish 13th after leading two laps. At the second race in Michigan, the GM Goodwrench Dealer 400, Speed led seven laps and looked poised to possibly capture his second NASCAR Winston Cup victory before getting caught up in a wreck started by Sterling Marlin. Though Speed qualified poorly for the Southern 500, he quickly moved his way through the field. Just as he neared running in the Top 10, a right front tire cut and Lake had to pit under the green flag, losing two laps. However, the strength of the car would prove itself as Speed worked his way back to finish 10th, the final Top 10 finish of his career.

In September 1996, the University of Nebraska–Lincoln announced a three year sponsorship deal with the assistance of former Husker linebacker Trev Alberts. However, the sponsorship never saw the track due to a disagreement over sharing space on the car with other sponsors.Speed and Melling ran a limited 1997 season. Speed qualified for all 25 races he attempted. Lake and the team raced to a solid 12th-place finish in the Pontiac Excitement 400 at Richmond, then followed that up with a 6th-place qualifying effort at Atlanta. During the midpoint of the season, the No. 9 car was filmed for the TV movie Steel Chariots. In the Miller 400 at Michigan, Speed earned his and the team's best finish of the season, an 11th. A few races later, Speed finished 12th in the Brickyard 400. At Richmond in the Exide NASCAR Select Batteries 400, Speed seemed to have one of the stronger cars, leading three laps through a series of green flag pit stops. However, during the stop, the crew bolted the left side tires on the right side and the right side tires on the left, forcing Speed to make multiple pit stops and dropping him out of a chance of having a good finish. A few races later, Lake had a 14th-place run at Martinsville in the Hanes 500. The Melling team was able to get sponsorship for the last four races of the season from Advantage Camo, their best finish being 17th at Rockingham's AC Delco 400. Speed finished 35th in points.

1998 was Speed's final Winston Cup season. Having secured sponsorship from Cartoon Network, Speed's best finish of the season was in the Daytona 500 where he tangled with John Andretti with two laps to go bringing out the yellow flag that effectively won the race for Dale Earnhardt. The 1998 season proved to be a challenge for Lake and the Melling Racing team. It appeared as if the team was struggling with the new Ford Taurus bodies, and that translated to some poor results. At Sears Point Raceway, Speed appeared to have a chance to turn his season around. He was strong during the first practice session with the second fastest speed behind Jeff Gordon. In the second practice session, Speed ran over debris thrown on the track by a car that had gotten off course, cut a tire and slammed into one of the tire barriers breaking his sternum. Speed missed the event and was replaced by Butch Gilliland, but he returned to the next race at New Hampshire. However Speed was caught up in a wreck not of his own making and aggravated his injury. Following the New Hampshire race, Speed felt it best for the team to find another driver. With no sponsors or ride he effectively retired from NASCAR racing.

== After retirement ==
In 2006, the International Kart Federation established the Lake Speed Achievement of Excellence karting award in honor of the 1978 World Karting Champion. The award was presented for the first time at the IKF 2-Cycle Sprint Grand Nationals August 3–6 at Fontana, California. The inaugural recipient was Matt Johnson of Las Vegas, Nevada. Nick Johnston of Northridge, California was awarded the honor in 2007. The award went to Taylor Miinch in 2008 and Mike Botelho Jr. in 2009. And youngest winner of the award went to Ryan Schartau of Chino, California in 2013. The recipient of the award could be a driver, team, kart shop or any combination thereof, and the winner is determined primarily on sportsmanship, driving achievement and professionalism during the race event.

On occasion, Speed still drives karts, and has four wins in Historic Stock Car Racing Association events on Daytona's 3.56-mile road course in 2002 and 2003 driving one of his old 83 Purex-sponsored Ford vehicles.

Speed currently races in the World Karting Association's National Road Racing Series schedule, in the Spec 125 TaG 1 and 2 classes. On July 30, 2010 Speed was inducted into the Mississippi Sports Hall of Fame. Since 2016, he has been an avid follower of the RHPK kart series. In November 2023, he went to Virginia International Raceway and raced his 1993 stock car at the age of 75.

== Motorsports career results ==
=== NASCAR ===
(key) (Bold – Pole position awarded by qualifying time. Italics – Pole position earned by points standings or practice time. * – Most laps led.)

==== Winston Cup Series ====
NASCAR Winston Cup Series results
Year	Team	No.	Make	1	2	3	4	5	6	7	8	9	10	11	12	13	14	15	16	17	18	19	20	21	22	23	24	25	26	27	28	29	30	31	32	33	NWCC	Pts	Ref
1980	Gordon Racing	24	Olds	RSD; 29																																	22nd	1853	
1980	Speed Racing	66	Chevy		DAY; DNQ	RCH	CAR	ATL; 11	BRI	DAR; 8	NWS	MAR	TAL; 7	NSV	DOV	CLT	TWS; 12	RSD; 26	MCH; 17	DAY; 38	NSV	POC; 30	TAL; 8	MCH; 16	BRI	DAR; 27	RCH										22nd	1853	
1980	Nelson Malloch Racing	7	Chevy																									DOV; 11	NWS; 21	MAR; 20	CLT; 7	CAR; 28	ATL; 24	ONT; 6			22nd	1853	
1981	Speed Racing	66	Chevy	RSD; 34																																	18th	2817	
1981	Speed Racing	66	Olds		DAY; DNQ	RCH; 12			BRI; 9	NWS; 23	DAR	MAR; 7				CLT; 28	TWS; 8	RSD			NSV; 22	POC; 27			BRI; 7		RCH; 20			NWS; 27		CAR; 31					18th	2817	
1981	Speed Racing	66	Buick				CAR; 9	ATL; 35					TAL; 18						MCH; 16	DAY; 33			TAL; 6	MCH; 15		DAR; 13		DOV; 27	MAR; 22		CLT; 34		ATL; 14	RSD; 16			18th	2817	
1981	Speed Racing	66	Pontiac											NSV; 24	DOV																						18th	2817	
1982	Speed Racing	66	Buick	DAY; 41																																	20th	2850	
1982	Hamby Motorsports	17	Buick		RCH; 19	BRI; 29	ATL; 33	CAR; 34	DAR; 17	NWS; 24	MAR; 24	TAL; 34			CLT; 12	POC; 20	RSD; 31	MCH; 34	DAY; 9	NSV; 13	POC; 33	TAL; 21	MCH; 12	BRI; 13	DAR; 6				CLT; 21								20th	2850	
1982	Hamby Motorsports	17	Pontiac										NSV; 30	DOV; 10												RCH; 10	DOV; 22	NWS; 8		MAR; 29	CAR; 33	ATL; 29	RSD; 32				20th	2850	
1983	Ellington Racing	1	Chevy	DAY; 25	RCH; 15	CAR; 4	ATL; 15	DAR; 28	NWS; 8	MAR; 23	TAL; 3	NSV	DOV	BRI	CLT; 6	RSD	POC; 12	MCH; 19	DAY; 29	NSV	POC	TAL; 26	MCH; 8	BRI	DAR; 15	RCH	DOV	MAR	NWS	CLT; 11	CAR; 28	ATL; 12	RSD				27th	2114	
1984	Ellington Racing	1	Chevy	DAY; 37	RCH; 12	CAR; 3	ATL; 9	BRI	NWS	DAR; 22	MAR	TAL; 33	NSV	DOV; 21	CLT; 6	RSD	POC; 10	MCH; 5	DAY; 42	NSV	POC	TAL; 8	MCH; 16	BRI	DAR; 14	RCH	DOV	MAR	CLT; 32		CAR; 29	ATL; 7					26th	2023	
1984	Hamby Motorsports	17	Pontiac																											NWS; 25							26th	2023	
1984	Hamby Motorsports	17	Chevy																														RSD; 17				26th	2023	
1985	RahMoc Enterprises	75	Pontiac	DAY; 2	RCH; 10	CAR; 4	ATL; 40	BRI; 7	DAR; 9	NWS; 9	MAR; 8	TAL; 10	DOV; 24	CLT; 6	RSD; 25	POC; 12	MCH; 14	DAY; 34	POC; 11	TAL; 8	MCH; 16	BRI; 10	DAR; 16	RCH; 11	DOV; 10	MAR; 11	NWS; 12	CLT; 12	CAR; 29	ATL; 7	RSD; 9						10th	3507	
1986	RahMoc Enterprises	75	Pontiac	DAY; 10	RCH; 17	CAR; 10	ATL; 22	BRI	DAR	NWS	MAR	TAL	DOV																								40th	608	
1986	Morgan-McClure Motorsports	4	Olds											CLT; 14	RSD	POC	MCH	DAY	POC	TAL	GLN	MCH	BRI	DAR	RCH	DOV	MAR	NWS	CLT	CAR	ATL	RSD					40th	608	
1987	Speed Racing	83	Olds	DAY; 26	CAR; 12	RCH; DNQ	ATL; 35	DAR; 31	NWS	BRI	MAR	TAL; 9	CLT; 3	DOV	POC	RSD	MCH; 10	DAY; 40	POC	TAL; 7	GLN	MCH; 16	BRI	DAR; 30	RCH	DOV	MAR	NWS	CLT; 7	CAR	RSD	ATL; 41					31st	1345	
1988	Speed Racing	83	Olds	DAY; 37	RCH; 6	CAR; 2	ATL; 38	DAR; 1*	BRI; 30	NWS; 26	MAR; 28	TAL; 15	CLT; 21	DOV; 4	RSD; 26	POC; 23	MCH; 29	DAY; 9	POC; 32	TAL; 13	GLN; 37	MCH; 5	BRI; 20	DAR; 12	RCH; 36	DOV; 9	MAR; 28	CLT; 34	NWS; 15	CAR; 24	PHO; 15	ATL; 37					17th	2984	
1989	Speed Racing	83	Olds	DAY; 30	CAR; 8	ATL; 21	RCH; 12	DAR; 10	BRI; 25	NWS; 27	MAR; 11	TAL; 18	CLT; 24	DOV; 18	SON; 5	POC; 11	MCH; 7	DAY; 24	POC; 29	TAL	GLN	MCH	BRI	DAR	RCH; 14	DOV; 36	MAR; 22	CLT; 38	NWS; 25	CAR; 19	PHO; 22	ATL; 10					27th	2550	
1990	Speed Racing	83	Olds	DAY; 16	RCH	CAR	ATL; DNQ	DAR	BRI	NWS	MAR	TAL; 38	CLT; 38	DOV	SON	POC	MCH; 33	DAY	POC	TAL; 11	GLN	MCH	BRI	DAR; 32	RCH	DOV	MAR	NWS	CLT	CAR	PHO	ATL					42nd	479	
1991	Cale Yarborough Motorsports	66	Pontiac	DAY	RCH	CAR	ATL	DAR; 40	BRI; 25	NWS; 13	MAR; 18	TAL; 31	CLT; 29	DOV; 22	SON; 12	POC; 17	MCH; 18	DAY; 38	POC; 30	TAL; 36	GLN; 33	MCH; 15	BRI; 11	DAR; 34	RCH; 17	DOV; 35	MAR; 32	NWS	CLT	CAR	PHO	ATL					32nd	1742	
1992	Speed Racing	83	Chevy	DAY; DNQ	CAR	RCH	ATL; 34	DAR; DNQ	BRI	NWS	MAR	TAL																									38th	726	
1992	Speed Racing	83	Ford										CLT; 19	DOV	SON	POC	MCH	DAY	POC; 36	TAL	GLN	MCH; 34	BRI	DAR; 26	RCH	DOV	MAR	NWS	CLT; 26	CAR; 36	PHO; 18	ATL; 18					38th	726	
1993	Speed Racing	83	Ford	DAY; 14	CAR	RCH; 30	ATL; 28	DAR	BRI; 29	NWS	MAR	TAL; 34	SON	CLT; 27	DOV; 30	POC; 27	MCH; 30	DAY; DNQ	NHA; 35	POC	TAL; 18																34th	1956	
1993	Yates Racing	28	Ford																			GLN; 27	MCH; 7	BRI; 16	DAR	RCH											34th	1956	
1993	Bud Moore Engineering	15	Ford																								DOV; 33	MAR; 24	NWS; 17	CLT; 11	CAR; 16	PHO; 13	ATL; 26				34th	1956	
1994	Bud Moore Engineering	15	Ford	DAY; 14	CAR; 21	RCH; 14	ATL; 6	DAR; 5	BRI; 3	NWS; 12	MAR; 30	TAL; 7	SON; 32	CLT; 14	DOV; 12	POC; 23	MCH; 40	DAY; 10	NHA; 15	POC; 20	TAL; 14	IND; 15	GLN; 13	MCH; 13	BRI; 25	DAR; 40	RCH; 21	DOV; 9	MAR; 34	NWS; 25	CLT; 5	CAR; 10	PHO; 14	ATL; 4			11th	3565	
1995	Melling Racing	9	Ford	DAY; 14	CAR; 32	RCH; 14	ATL; 15	DAR; 29	BRI; 17	NWS; 25	MAR; 26	TAL; 16	SON; 40	CLT; 8	DOV; 34	POC; 28	MCH; 11	DAY; 21	NHA; 24	POC; 22	TAL; 35	IND; 34	GLN; 20	MCH; 17	BRI; 29	DAR; 9	RCH; 21	DOV; 32	MAR; 20	NWS; 35	CLT; 21	CAR; 24	PHO; 22	ATL; 19			23rd	2921	
1996	Melling Racing	9	Ford	DAY; 14	CAR; 25	RCH; 18	ATL; 41	DAR; 25	BRI; 35	NWS; 35	MAR; 11	TAL; 42	SON; 16	CLT; 35	DOV; 26	POC; 34	MCH; 19	DAY; 29	NHA; 24	POC; 8	TAL; 30	IND; 13	GLN; 17	MCH; 32	BRI; 16	DAR; 10	RCH; 31	DOV; 13	MAR; 28	NWS; 25	CLT; 12	CAR; 35	PHO; 28	ATL; 19			23rd	2834	
1997	Melling Racing	9	Ford	DAY; 24	CAR; 15	RCH; 12	ATL; 22	DAR; 36	TEX; 16	BRI; 36	MAR; 25	SON	TAL; 21	CLT; 24	DOV	POC	MCH; 11	CAL; 20	DAY; 29	NHA	POC	IND; 12	GLN	MCH; 21	BRI; 29	DAR; 18	RCH; 36	NHA; 18	DOV	MAR; 14	CLT; 38	TAL; 36	CAR; 17	PHO; 37	ATL; 26		35th	2301	
1998	Melling Racing	9	Ford	DAY; 17	CAR; 27	LVS; 32	ATL; 28	DAR; 25	BRI; 31	TEX; 20	MAR; 20	TAL; 25	CAL; 32	CLT; 27	DOV; 36	RCH; 26	MCH; 25	POC; 25	SON; Wth^{†}	NHA; 41	POC	IND	GLN	MCH	BRI	NHA	DAR	RCH	DOV	MAR	CLT	TAL	DAY	PHO	CAR	ATL	43rd	1297	
^{†} - Injured in practice and replaced by Butch Gilliland

===== Daytona 500 =====
Year	Team	Manufacturer	Start	Finish
1980	Speed Racing	Chevrolet	DNQ	
1981	Speed Racing	Oldsmobile	DNQ	
1982	Speed Racing	Buick	32	41
1983	Ellington Racing	Chevrolet	16	25
1984	Ellington Racing	Chevrolet	16	37
1985	RahMoc Enterprises	Pontiac	14	2
1986	RahMoc Enterprises	Pontiac	36	10
1987	Speed Racing	Oldsmobile	33	26
1988	Speed Racing	Oldsmobile	10	37
1989	Speed Racing	Oldsmobile	39	30
1990	Speed Racing	Oldsmobile	14	16
1992	Speed Racing	Chevrolet	DNQ	
1993	Speed Racing	Ford	13	14
1994	Bud Moore Engineering	Ford	22	14
1995	Melling Racing	Ford	16	14
1996	Melling Racing	Ford	32	14
1997	Melling Racing	Ford	35	24
1998	Melling Racing	Ford	16	17

==== Busch Series ====
NASCAR Busch Series results
Year	Team	No.	Make	1	2	3	4	5	6	7	8	9	10	11	12	13	14	15	16	17	18	19	20	21	22	23	24	25	26	27	28	29	30	31	32	33	34	35	NBGNC	Pts	Ref
1983	Speed Racing	66	Pontiac	DAY	RCH	CAR	HCY	MAR	NWS	SBO	GPS	LGY	DOV	BRI	CLT	SBO	HCY	ROU	SBO	ROU	CRW	ROU	SBO	HCY	LGY	IRP	GPS	BRI	HCY	DAR	RCH	NWS	SBO	MAR	ROU	CLT; 6	HCY	MAR	104th	150	
1984	Speed Racing	83	Pontiac	DAY; 2	RCH	CAR	HCY	MAR	DAR; 25	ROU	NSV	LGY	MLW	DOV	CLT; 3	SBO	HCY	ROU	SBO	ROU	HCY	IRP	LGY	SBO	BRI	DAR; 26	RCH	NWS	CLT; 29	HCY	CAR	MAR							37th	584	
