= Mello Yello 200 =

Mello Yello 200 may refer to:

- Mello Yello 200 (Hickory), a Budweiser Late Model Sportsman Series race run at Hickory Motor Speedway in March 1983
- Mello Yello 200 (Rougemont), a 1983 NASCAR Budweiser Late Model Sportsman Series race run at Orange County Speedway in July 1983

== See also ==
- Mello Yello 300, 1980–1984
- Mello Yello 500, 1990–1994
