= 1983 NASCAR Budweiser Late Model Sportsman Series =

American motorsport season

Seasons
- ← 1982 1984 →

The 1983 NASCAR Budweiser Late Model Sportsman Series began on February 19 and ended on October 30. Sam Ard won the championship at season's end.

== Schedule ==
Schedule as follows

No.	Race title	Track	Date	TV
1	Goody's 300	Daytona International Speedway	February 19	
2	Eastern 150	Richmond Fairgrounds Raceway	February 26	
3	Coca-Cola 200	North Carolina Motor Speedway	March 5	ESPN
4	Mello Yello 200	Hickory Speedway	March 13	
5	Miller Time 250	Martinsville Speedway	March 20	
6	Holly Farms Fried Chicken 399	North Wilkesboro Speedway	April 3	
7	WDVA 200	South Boston Speedway	April 16	
8	Coca-Cola 200	Greenville-Pickens Speedway	April 30	
9	Hampton Chevrolet 200	Langley Speedway	May 7	
10	Late Model Sportsman 200	Dover Downs International Speedway	May 14	
11	Southeastern 150	Bristol Motor Speedway	May 21	
12	Charlotte Mello Yello 300	Charlotte Motor Speedway	May 28	ESPN
13	Busch 200	South Boston Speedway	Jun 4	
14	Shoney's 200	Hickory Motor Speedway	June 11	
15	L. D. Swain & Son 200	Orange County Speedway	June 18	
16	Rose's Stores 200	South Boston Speedway	June 25	
17	Mason Day Paving 200	Orange County Speedway	July 2	
18	Goody's Invitational 200	Caraway Speedway	July 6	
19	Mello Yello 200	Orange County Speedway	July 9	
20	Coca-Cola 200	South Boston Speedway	July 23	
21	Goody's 200	Hickory Motor Speedway	July 30	
22	Virginia 200	Langley Speedway	August 6	
23	Kroger NASCAR 200	Indianapolis Raceway Park	August 13	
24	Dapco Auto Parts 200	Greenville-Pickens Speedway	August 20	
25	Free Service Tire Stores 150	Bristol Motor Speedway	August 26	
26	Bobby Isaac Memorial 200	Hickory Motor Speedway	September 3	
27	Darlington 250	Darlington Raceway	September 4	
28	Miller Time 150	Richmond Fairgrounds Raceway	September 10	
29	Coca-Cola 400	North Wilkesboro Speedway	September 11	
30	Miller High Life Invitational 300	South Boston Speedway	September 17	
31	Autumn 150	Martinsville Speedway	September 24	
32	Soloman Enterprises 200	Orange County Speedway	October 1	
33	Miller Time 300	Charlotte Motor Speedway	October 8	
34	Benny Yount Chrysler-Plymouth 200	Hickory Motor Speedway	October 16	
35	Cardinal 250	Martinsville Speedway	October 30	

== Races ==
=== Goody's 300 ===
The Goody's 300 was held February 19 at Daytona International Speedway. Sam Ard won the pole.

Top Ten Results

1. #17 - Darrell Waltrip
2. #89 - Geoff Bodine
3. #75 - Neil Bonnett
4. #28 - Phil Parsons
5. #7 - Morgan Shepherd
6. #00 - Sam Ard
7. #12 - Tommy Ellis
8. #82 - Joe Ruttman
9. #21 - Larry Pearson
10. #6 - Tommy Houston

=== Eastern 150 ===
The Eastern 150 was held February 26 at Richmond Fairgrounds Raceway.

Top Ten Results

1. #00 - Sam Ard
2. #6 - Tommy Houston
3. #1 - Pete Silva
4. #11 - Jack Ingram
5. #50 - Geoff Bodine
6. #20 - Bosco Lowe
7. #28 - Phil Parsons
8. #14 - Ronnie Silver
9. #44 - Rick Hanley
10. #06 - Rodney Howard

=== Coca-Cola 200 ===
The Coca-Cola 200 was held March 5 at North Carolina Motor Speedway.

Top Ten Results

1. #15 - Dale Earnhardt
2. #88 - Bobby Allison
3. #01 - Butch Lindley
4. #34 - L. D. Ottinger
5. #70 - Bosco Lowe
6. #75 - Neil Bonnett
7. #6 - Tommy Houston
8. #11 - Jack Ingram
9. #28 - Phil Parsons
10. #1 - Pete Silva

=== Mello Yello 200 ===
The Mello Yello 200 was held March 13 at Hickory Motor Speedway.

Top Ten Results

1. #12 - Tommy Ellis
2. #7 - Morgan Shepherd
3. #00 - Sam Ard
4. #1 - Pete Silva
5. #14 - Ronnie Silver
6. #11 - Jack Ingram
7. #32 - Dale Jarrett
8. #28 - Phil Parsons
9. #06 - Rodney Howard
10. #10 - Gary Neice

=== Miller Time 250 ===
The Miller Time 250 was held March 20 at Martinsville Speedway.

Top Ten Results

1. #00 - Sam Ard
2. #7 - Morgan Shepherd
3. #11 - Jack Ingram
4. #4 - Joe Thurman
5. #1 - Pete Silva
6. #6 - Tommy Houston
7. #16 - Jimmy Lawson
8. #06 - Rodney Howard
9. #12 - Tommy Ellis
10. #19 - Diane Teel

=== Holly Farms Fried Chicken 3-99 ===
The Holly Farms Fried Chicken 3-99 was held April 3 at North Wilkesboro Speedway.

Top Ten Results

1. #00 - Sam Ard
2. #6 - Tommy Houston
3. #7 - Morgan Shepherd
4. #1 - Pete Silva
5. #14 - Ronnie Silver
6. #11 - Jack Ingram
7. #2 - Jeff Hensley
8. #4 - Joe Thurman
9. #16 - Jimmy Lawson
10. #04 - Eddie Falk

=== WDVA 200 ===
The WDVA 200 was held April 16 at South Boston Speedway.

Top Ten Results

1. #12 - Tommy Ellis
2. #20 - Bosco Lowe
3. #10 - Gary Neice
4. #2 - Jeff Hensley
5. #04 - Eddie Falk
6. #63 - Jimmy Hensley
7. #7 - Morgan Shepherd
8. #39 - Mitchell Clark
9. #32 - Dale Jarrett
10. #01 - Butch Lindley

=== Coca-Cola 200 ===
The Coca-Cola 200 was held April 30 at Greenville-Pickens Speedway.

Top Ten Results

1. #11 - Jack Ingram
2. #01 - Butch Lindley
3. #32 - Dale Jarrett
4. #6 - Tommy Houston
5. #03 - Tony Warren
6. #7 - Morgan Shepherd
7. #27 - Mike Messer
8. #2 - Jeff Hensley
9. #00 - Sam Ard
10. #04 - Eddie Falk

=== Hampton Chevrolet 250 ===
The Hampton Chevrolet 250 was held May 7 at Langley Speedway.

Top Ten Results

1. #11 - Jack Ingram
2. #1 - Pete Silva
3. #32 - Dale Jarrett
4. #6 - Tommy Houston
5. #9 - Bob Shreeves
6. #07 - Dickie Boswell
7. #00 - Sam Ard
8. #16 - Jimmy Lawson
9. #20 - Bosco Lowe
10. #22 - Rick Mast

=== Late Model Sportsman 200 ===
The Sportsman 200 was held May 14 at Dover Downs International Speedway.

Top Ten Results

1. #01 - Ricky Rudd
2. #22 - Bobby Allison
3. #00 - Sam Ard
4. #15 - Dale Earnhardt
5. #24 - Glenn Jarrett
6. #1 - Pete Silva
7. #70 - Bosco Lowe
8. #12 - Tommy Ellis
9. #34 - Joe Kelly
10. #08 - Ken Bouchard

=== Southeastern 150 ===
The Southeastern 150 was held May 21 at Bristol Motor Speedway.

Top Ten Results

1. #7 - Morgan Shepherd
2. #32 - Dale Jarrett
3. #12 - Tommy Ellis
4. #22 - Rick Mast
5. #6 - Tommy Houston
6. #20 - Bosco Lowe
7. #18 - Jeff Berry
8. #63 - Jimmy Hensley
9. #00 - Sam Ard
10. #72 - Tommy Hilbert

=== Charlotte Mello Yello 300 ===
The Charlotte Mello Yello 300 was held May 28 at Charlotte Motor Speedway.

Top Ten Results

1. #15 - Dale Earnhardt
2. #75 - Neil Bonnett
3. #17 - Bill Elliott
4. #28 - Harry Gant
5. #22 - Bobby Allison
6. #11 - Jack Ingram
7. #98 - Joe Ruttman
8. #6 - Tommy Houston
9. #23 - Davey Allison
10. #34 - Joe Kelly
- Earnhardt's win is now recognised as the first-ever NASCAR win for Hendrick Motorsports, as it was the first NASCAR national series for All Star Racing, a partnership between Rick Hendrick and Robert Gee. That team moved to the Cup Series in 1984, and in 1985 became Hendrick Motorsports.

=== Busch 200 ===
The Busch 200 was held June 4 at South Boston Speedway.

Top Ten Results

1. #12 - Tommy Ellis
2. #36 - Butch Lindley
3. #11 - Jack Ingram
4. #22 - Rick Mast
5. #32 - Dale Jarrett
6. #1 - Pete Silva
7. #51 - Robert Ingram
8. #41 - Jack Bland
9. #16 - Jimmy Lawson
10. #20 - Bosco Lowe

=== Shoney's 200 ===
The Shoney's 200 was held June 11 at Hickory Motor Speedway.

Top Ten Results

1. #12 - Tommy Ellis
2. #11 - Jack Ingram
3. #00 - Sam Ard
4. #9 - Bob Shreeves
5. #36 - Butch Lindley
6. #03 - Tony Warren
7. #66 - Bennie Davis
8. #63 - Jimmy Hensley
9. #32 - Dale Jarrett
10. #14 - Ronnie Silver

=== L. D. Swain & Son 200 ===
The L. D. Swain & Son 200 was held June 18 at Orange County Speedway.

Top Ten Results

1. #11 - Jack Ingram
2. #12 - Tommy Ellis
3. #36 - Butch Lindley
4. #00 - Sam Ard
5. #6 - Tommy Houston
6. #9 - Bob Shreeves
7. #14 - Ronnie Silver
8. #28 - Phil Parsons
9. #55 - Jimmy Hensley
10. #45 - Charlie Luck

=== Rose's Stores 200 ===
The Rose's Stores 200 was held June 25 at South Boston Speedway.

Top Ten Results

1. #12 - Tommy Ellis
2. #11 - Jack Ingram
3. #36 - Butch Lindley
4. #7 - Morgan Shepherd
5. #9 - Bob Shreeves
6. #04 - Eddie Falk
7. #28 - Phil Parsons
8. #45 - Charlie Luck
9. #14 - Ronnie Silver
10. #20 - Dickie Boswell

=== Mason Day Paving 200 ===
The Mason Day Paving 200 was held July 2 at Orange County Speedway.

Top Ten Results

1. #6 - Tommy Houston
2. #11 - Jack Ingram
3. #32 - Dale Jarrett
4. #00 - Sam Ard
5. #14 - Ronnie Silver
6. #55 - Jimmy Hensley
7. #51 - Robert Ingram
8. #69 - Junior Miller
9. #9 - Bob Shreeves
10. #2 - Jeff Hensley

=== Goody's Invitational 200 ===
The Goody's Invitational 200 was held July 6 at Caraway Speedway.

Top Ten Results

1. #01 - Butch Lindley
2. #11 - Jack Ingram
3. #55 - Jimmy Hensley
4. #6 - Tommy Houston
5. #32 - Dale Jarrett
6. #04 - Eddie Falk
7. #00 - Sam Ard
8. #14 - Ronnie Silver
9. #9 - Bob Shreeves
10. #2 - Jeff Hensley

=== Mello Yello 200 ===
The Mello Yello 200 was held July 9 at Orange County Speedway.

Top Ten Results

1. #6 - Tommy Houston
2. #11 - Jack Ingram
3. #00 - Sam Ard
4. #28 - Phil Parsons
5. #32 - Dale Jarrett
6. #12 - Tommy Ellis
7. #55 - Jimmy Hensley
8. #14 - Ronnie Silver
9. #04 - Eddie Falk
10. #01 - Butch Lindley

=== Coca-Cola 200 ===
The Coca-Cola 200 was held July 23 at South Boston Speedway.

Top Ten Results

1. #12 - Tommy Ellis
2. #11 - Jack Ingram
3. #32 - Dale Jarrett
4. #00 - Sam Ard
5. #51 - Robert Ingram
6. #6 - Tommy Houston
7. #22 - Rick Mast
8. #9 - Bob Shreeves
9. #27 - Bosco Lowe
10. #21 - Larry Pearson

=== Goody's 200 ===
The Goody's 200 was held July 30 at Hickory Motor Speedway.

Top Ten Results

1. #00 - Sam Ard
2. #11 - Jack Ingram
3. #12 - Tommy Ellis
4. #9 - Bob Shreeves
5. #32 - Dale Jarrett
6. #14 - Ronnie Silver
7. #04 - Eddie Falk
8. #21 - Larry Pearson
9. #63 - Jimmy Hensley
10. #4 - Joe Thurman

=== Virginia 200 ===
The Virginia 200 was held August 6 at Langley Speedway.

Top Ten Results

1. #11 - Jack Ingram
2. #32 - Dale Jarrett
3. #12 - Tommy Ellis
4. #36 - Butch Lindley
5. #16 - Jimmy Lawson
6. #04 - Eddie Falk
7. #00 - Sam Ard
8. #55 - Jimmy Hensley
9. #9 - Bob Shreeves
10. #45 - Charlie Luck

=== Kroger NASCAR 200 ===
The Kroger NASCAR 200 was held August 13 at Indianapolis Raceway Park.

Top Ten Results

1. #6 - Tommy Houston
2. #17 - Darrell Waltrip
3. #00 - Sam Ard
4. #28 - Phil Parsons
5. #12 - Tommy Ellis
6. #32 - Dale Jarrett
7. #06 - Rodney Howard
8. #7 - Morgan Shepherd
9. #63 - Jimmy Hensley
10. #14 - Ronnie Silver

=== Dapco Auto Parts 200 ===
The Dapco Auto Parts 200 was held August 20 at Greenville-Pickens Speedway.

Top Ten Results

1. #36 - Butch Lindley
2. #32 - Dale Jarrett
3. #11 - Jack Ingram
4. #63 - Jimmy Hensley
5. #14 - Ronnie Silver
6. #00 - Sam Ard
7. #45 - Charlie Luck
8. #21 - Larry Pearson
9. #2 - Jeff Hensley
10. #66 - Bennie Davis

=== Free Service Tire Stores 150 ===
The Free Service Tire Stores 150 was held August 26 at Bristol Motor Speedway.

Top Ten Results

1. #00 - Sam Ard
2. #11 - Jack Ingram
3. #12 - Tommy Ellis
4. #7 - Morgan Shepherd
5. #22 - Rick Mast
6. #6 - Tommy Houston
7. #45 - Charlie Luck
8. #16 - Jimmy Lawson
9. #72 - Tommy Hilbert
10. #81 - Jeff Hall

=== Bobby Isaac Memorial 200 ===
The Bobby Isaac Memorial 200 was held September 3 at Hickory Motor Speedway.

Top Ten Results

1. #6 - Tommy Houston
2. #11 - Jack Ingram
3. #32 - Dale Jarrett
4. #12 - Tommy Ellis
5. #00 - Sam Ard
6. #1 - Pete Silva
7. #16 - Jimmy Lawson
8. #9 - Bob Shreeves
9. #14 - Ronnie Silver
10. #04 - Eddie Falk

=== Darlington 250 ===
The Darlington 250 was held September 4 at Darlington Raceway.

Top Ten Results

1. #75 - Neil Bonnett
2. #00 - Sam Ard
3. #11 - Jack Ingram
4. #23 - Davey Allison
5. #08 - Ron Bouchard
6. #24 - Glenn Jarrett
7. #12 - Tommy Ellis
8. #6 - Tommy Houston
9. #70 - Bosco Lowe
10. #1 - Pete Silva
- This race was run on Sunday. Under South Carolina Blue Laws, the distance was 250 miles to comply with the ban on Sunday racing unless the race distance was 250 miles or greater.

=== Miller Time 150 ===
The Miller Time 150 was held September 10 at Richmond Fairgrounds Raceway.

Top Ten Results

1. #7 - Morgan Shepherd
2. #12 - Tommy Ellis
3. #32 - Dale Jarrett
4. #6 - Tommy Houston
5. #00 - Sam Ard
6. #63 - Jimmy Hensley
7. #11 - Jack Ingram
8. #07 - Bosco Lowe
9. #20 - Dickie Boswell
10. #41 - Jack Bland

=== Coca-Cola 400 ===
The Coca-Cola 400 was held September 11 at North Wilkesboro Speedway.

Top Ten Results

1. #12 - Tommy Ellis
2. #6 - Tommy Houston
3. #7 - Jimmy Hensley
4. #21 - Larry Pearson
5. #00 - Sam Ard
6. #11 - Jack Ingram
7. #28 - Phil Parsons
8. #14 - Ronnie Silver
9. #82 - Bob Shreeves
10. #06 - Rodney Howard

=== Miller High Life Invitational 300 ===
The Miller High Life Invitational 300 was held September 17 at South Boston Speedway.

Top Ten Results

1. #00 - Sam Ard
2. #11 - Jack Ingram
3. #14 - Ronnie Silver
4. #12 - Tommy Ellis
5. #20 - Dickie Boswell
6. #28 - Phil Parsons
7. #50 - Al Hylton
8. #6 - Tommy Houston
9. #04 - Eddie Falk
10. #2 - Jeff Hensley

=== Autumn 150 ===
The Autumn 150 was held September 24 at Martinsville Speedway.

Top Ten Results

1. #00 - Sam Ard
2. #7 - Morgan Shepherd
3. #32 - Dale Jarrett
4. #28 - Phil Parsons
5. #11 - Jack Ingram
6. #63 - Jimmy Hensley
7. #45 - Charlie Luck
8. #03 - Pete Silva
9. #04 - Eddie Falk
10. #22 - Rick Mast

=== Soloman Enterprises 200 ===
The Soloman Enterprises 200 was held October 1 at Orange County Speedway.

Top Ten Results

1. #00 - Sam Ard
2. #32 -Dale Jarrett
3. #6 - Tommy Houston
4. #11 - Jack Ingram
5. #63 - Jimmy Hensley
6. #22 - Rick Mast
7. #20 - Dickie Boswell
8. #41 - Jack Bland
9. #2 - Jeff Hensley
10. #04 - Eddie Falk

=== Miller Time 300 ===
The Miller Time 300 was held October 8 at Charlotte Motor Speedway.

Top Ten Results

1. #00 - Sam Ard
2. #15 - Dale Earnhardt
3. #74 - Ron Bouchard
4. #22 - Bobby Allison
5. #75 - Neil Bonnett
6. #66 - Lake Speed
7. #23 - Davey Allison
8. #24 - Glenn Jarrett
9. #1 - Pete Silva
10. #89 - Rodney Combs

=== Benny Yount Chrysler-Plymouth 200 ===
The Benny Yount Chrysler-Plymouth 200 was held October 16 at Hickory Motor Speedway.

Top Ten Results

1. #11 - Jack Ingram
2. #00 - Sam Ard
3. #32 - Dale Jarrett
4. #14 - Ronnie Silver
5. #45 - Charlie Luck
6. #9 - Bob Shreeves
7. #42 - Allan Powell
8. #7 - Morgan Shepherd
9. #04 - Eddie Falk
10. #96 - Ronnie Davidson

=== Cardinal 250 ===
The Cardinal 250 was held October 30 at Martinsville Speedway.

Top Ten Results

1. #00 - Sam Ard
2. #32 - Dale Jarrett
3. #11 - Jack Ingram
4. #47 - Pete Silva
5. #63 - Jimmy Hensley
6. #88 - Jay Hedgecock
7. #28 - Phil Parsons
8. #2 - Jeff Hensley
9. #9 - Bob Shreeves
10. #82 - Larry Ogle

== Final Points Standings ==
1. Sam Ard - 5454
2. Jack Ingram - 5367
3. Tommy Houston - 4933
4. Tommy Ellis - 4929
5. Dale Jarrett - 4837
6. Ronnie Silver - 4058
7. Pete Silva - 3945
8. Jimmy Hensley - 3716
9. Eddie Falk - 3617
10. Jeff Hensley - 3444

== See also ==
- 1983 NASCAR Winston Cup Series
- 1983 NASCAR Winston West Series
