= 1985 Winston 500 =

Auto race held at Talladega Superspeedway in 1985

Race details
- Race 9 of 28 in the 1985 NASCAR Winston Cup Series season
- Bill Elliott in victory lane after winning the 1985 Winston 500
- Date: May 5, 1985
- Official name: Winston 500
- Location: Alabama International Motor Speedway, Talladega, Alabama
- Course: Permanent racing facility
- Course length: 2.660 miles (4.280 km)
- Distance: 188 laps, 500.1 mi (804.8 km)
- Weather: Temperatures of 81 °F (27 °C); wind speeds of 4.1 miles per hour (6.6 km/h)
- Average speed: 186.288 mph (299.801 km/h); 2 hours, 41 minutes, 04 seconds
- Attendance: 122,000

Pole position
Driver	Bill Elliott 45.7311 seconds 209.398 mph (336.993 km/h)	Melling Racing

Most laps led
Driver	Cale Yarborough	Ranier-Lundy Racing
- Laps: 97

Winner
No. 9	Bill Elliott	Melling Racing

Television in the United States
- Network: NBC
- Announcers: Paul Page; Bobby Unser

The 1985 Winston 500 was a NASCAR Winston Cup Series race that took place on May 5, 1985, at Alabama International Motor Speedway in Talladega, Alabama as race number 9 of 28 of the 1985 NASCAR Winston Cup Series season.

== Background ==
Talladega Superspeedway, originally known as Alabama International Motor Superspeedway (AIMS), is a motorsports complex located north of Talladega, Alabama. It is located on the former Anniston Air Force Base in the small city of Lincoln. The track is a Tri-oval and was constructed by International Speedway Corporation, a business controlled by the France Family, in the 1960s. Talladega is most known for its steep banking and the unique location of the start/finish line - located just past the exit to pit road. The track currently hosts the NASCAR series such as the Sprint Cup Series, Xfinity Series, and the Camping World Truck Series. Talladega Superspeedway is the longest NASCAR oval with a length of 2.66 miles (4.28 km), and the track at its peak had a seating capacity of 175,000 spectators.

Bill Elliott dominated the early part of the 1985 season, including winning the Daytona 500, the first race of the Winston Million promotion. The Winston 500 was the second. Later in the season at the Southern 500, Elliott would go on to become the first Winston Million winner.

== Race report ==
There were 40 drivers who qualified for this race with 1 driver withdrawing (Greg Sacks due to a blown engine); the pole position winner was Bill Elliott who qualified at a then-track record speed of 209.398 miles per hour (336.993 km/h) in a Ford Thunderbird. He would go on to beat Kyle Petty by nearly two seconds at a then-record average speed of 186.288 miles per hour (299.801 km/h) for the race; a record that stood until broken in the 1997 Winston 500 by Mark Martin.

More than 100,000 live spectators saw more than two and a half hours of racing with two cautions periods (lasting for only eight laps). This relatively clean race would see 28 different lead changes. Canadian driver Trevor Boys would finish in last place due to a problem with the engine on lap 6. Bosco Lowe and Dick Skillen would exit NASCAR after this race while Geoff Bodine would lose the championship points lead to Terry Labonte.

Some of the drivers were complaining (most notably Bobby Allison and Darrell Waltrip) about how it was difficult to draft off the back end of the '85 Thunderbird's in general and Elliott in specific. They commented that they felt the shape of the rear of the car was the reason why the average NASCAR driver found it difficult to draft off of Elliott.

Early in the race, a broken oil fitting would put Elliott nearly two laps out of the lead before he managed a comeback. Elliott would return to the track and begin consistently running laps near 205 mph, making up the two laps lost without the aide of a yellow flag or the draft.

The Ford Thunderbirds placed 1-2-3 with Kyle Petty beating Cale Yarborough in a photo finish for second place behind Elliott. The Ford trio were the only drivers to finish on the lead lap.

== Full Results ==
Average speed: 186.288 mph (299.801 km/h)
Pole speed: 209.398 mph (336.993 km/h)
Attendance: 122,000

=== Box Score ===
Pos	Grid	No.	Driver	Manufacturer	Laps	Laps led	Points	Time/Status
1	1	9	Bill Elliott	Ford Thunderbird	188	60	180*	2:41:04
2	4	7	Kyle Petty	Ford Thunderbird	188	9	175*	-1.72 seconds
3	2	28	Cale Yarborough	Ford Thunderbird	188	97	175**	Flagged
4	17	22	Bobby Allison	Buick Regal	187	3	165*	-1 lap
5	15	15	Ricky Rudd	Ford Thunderbird	187		155	-1 lap
6	32	88	Buddy Baker	Oldsmobile Cutlass	185		150	-3 laps
7	3	44	Terry Labonte	Chevrolet Monte Carlo	185	2	151*	-3 laps
8	18	71	Dave Marcis	Chevrolet Monte Carlo	185		142	-3 laps
9	7	8	Bobby Hillin Jr.	Chevrolet Monte Carlo	184		138	-4 laps
10	20	75	Lake Speed	Pontiac Grand Prix	183		134	-5 laps
11	14	5	Geoffrey Bodine	Chevrolet Monte Carlo	182		130	-6 laps
12	24	52	Jimmy Means	Chevrolet Monte Carlo	181		127	-7 Laps
13	22	38	Morgan Shepherd	Chevrolet Monte Carlo	180		124	-8 Laps
14	28	67	Buddy Arrington	Ford Thunderbird	175		121	-13 Laps
15	38	70	J.D. McDuffie	Pontiac Grand Prix	174		118	-14 Laps
16	27	27	Tim Richmond	Pontiac Grand Prix	171		115	-17 Laps
17	37	17	Bosco Lowe	Chevrolet Monte Carlo	171			-17 Laps
18	39	79	Dick Skillen	Chevrolet Monte Carlo	167		109	-21 Laps
19	31	6	Eddie Bierschwale	Chevrolet Monte Carlo	161		106	Engine
20	21	90	Ken Schrader	Ford Thunderbird	159		103	-29 Laps
21	13	3	Dale Earnhardt	Chevrolet Monte Carlo	155	12	105*	Engine
22	26	99	Connie Saylor	Chevrolet Monte Carlo	155		97	Ignition
23	29	64	Clark Dwyer	Ford Thunderbird	150		94	Ignition
24	5	11	Darrell Waltrip	Chevrolet Monte Carlo	137	1	96*	Piston
25	10	95	Sterling Marlin	Chevrolet Monte Carlo	113		88	Engine
26	12	12	Neil Bonnett	Chevrolet Monte Carlo	106	1	90*	Water Leak
27	9	43	Richard Petty	Pontiac Grand Prix	94	1	87*	Valve
28	19	47	Ron Bouchard	Buick Regal	85		79	Suspension
29	16	55	Benny Parsons	Chevrolet Monte Carlo	74	2	81*	Driveshaft
30	6	4	Joe Ruttman	Chevrolet Monte Carlo	70		73	Transmission
31	23	84	Mike Alexander	Chevrolet Monte Carlo	70		70	Engine
32	34	74	Bobby Wawak	Chevrolet Monte Carlo	61		67	Wheel
33	36	49	Don Hume	Chevrolet Monte Carlo	35		64	Vibration
34	11	66	Phil Parsons	Chevrolet Monte Carlo	33		61	Wheel Bearing
35	33	00	Phil Barkdoll	Chevrolet Monte Carlo	33		58	Engine
36	8	21	David Pearson	Chevrolet Monte Carlo	26		55	Carburetor
37	35	2	Rusty Wallace	Pontiac Grand Prix	7		52	Engine
38	25	33	Harry Gant	Chevrolet Monte Carlo	7		49	Engine
39	30	98	(Canada) Trevor Boys	Chevrolet Monte Carlo	6		46	Engine
WD	40	51	Greg Sacks	Chevrolet Monte Carlo	0			Withdrawn due to Engine Failure

* - Includes 5 bonus points for leading at least 1 lap.
** - Includes additional 5 bonus points for leading the most laps.

=== Cautions ===
2 for 8 laps

Start Lap	End Lap	# of laps	Reason
160	163	4	Geoffrey Bodine accident, turn 4
174	177	4	Eddie Bierschwale accident, turn 4

=== Lap Leader Breakdown ===
Lead changes: 28

Driver	From Lap	To Lap	# of Laps
Cale Yarborough	1	4	4
Kyle Petty	5	5	1
Bill Elliott	6	27	22
Dale Earnhardt	28	33	6
Bill Elliott	34	36	3
Terry Labonte	37	37	1
Dale Earnhardt	38	39	2
Kyle Petty	40	42	3
Dale Earnhardt	43	43	1
Cale Yarborough	44	47	4
Dale Earnhardt	48	48	1
Richard Petty	49	49	1
Kyle Petty	50	53	4
Cale Yarborough	54	70	17
Neil Bonnett	71	71	1
Benny Parsons	72	73	2
Bobby Allison	74	75	2
Cale Yarborough	76	102	27
Bobby Allison	103	103	1
Darrell Waltrip	104	104	1
Terry Labonte	105	105	1
Cale Yarborough	106	131	26
Dale Earnhardt	132	133	2
Kyle Petty	134	134	1
Cale Yarborough	135	144	10
Bill Elliott	145	159	15
Cale Yarborough	160	168	9
Bill Elliott	169	188	20

== Failed to qualify ==
Name	Car #	Car manufacturer
Eldon Dotson	96	Chevrolet Monte Carlo
Delma Cowart	0	Chevrolet Monte Carlo
Slick Johnson	05	Ford Thunderbird
Blackie Wangerin	39	Ford Thunderbird
Craig Spetman	08	Chevrolet Monte Carlo
Rick Newsom	20	Chevrolet Monte Carlo
Ronnie Thomas	41	Chevrolet Monte Carlo
Mike Potter	68	Ford Thunderbird
Steve Moore	73	Chevrolet Monte Carlo
Mark Stahl	82	Ford Thunderbird
Ken Ragan (car was driven by Bosco Lowe)	17	Chevrolet Monte Carlo

== Standings after the race ==
Pos	Driver	Points	Differential
1 ▲	Terry Labonte	1355	0
2 ▼	Geoffrey Bodine	1343	-12
3 ▲	Bill Elliott	1312	-43
4 ▼	Neil Bonnett	1279	-76
5 ▲	Ricky Rudd	1228	-127
6	Lake Speed	1215	-140
7 ▼	Darrell Waltrip	1208	-147
8 ▲	Kyle Petty	1197	-158
9 ▲	Bobby Allison	1187	-168
10 ▼	Dale Earnhardt	1150	-205

Preceded by 1985 Sovran Bank 500	NASCAR Winston Cup Series Season; 1985	Succeeded by 1985 Budweiser 500

Preceded by 1984	Winston 500 races 1985	Succeeded by 1986
