= Ronnie Silver =

American stock car racing driver and crew chief

- Born: July 20, 1951 (age 75); Asheville, North Carolina, U.S.

NASCAR O'Reilly Auto Parts Series career
- 182 races run over 8 years
- Best finish: 5th (1984)
- First race: 1982 Southeastern 150 (Bristol)
- Last race: 1989 AC-Delco 200 (North Carolina)
- First win: 1985 Bobby Isaac Memorial 200 (Hickory)
- Last win: 1986 Mountain Dew 400 (Hickory)
Wins	Top tens	Poles
2	79	0

Ronnie Silver (born July 20, 1951) is an American former stock car racer and crew chief. He raced in the NASCAR Busch Series for eight seasons, winning two races.

== Career ==
A native of Asheville, North Carolina, Silver's career started in the Whelen All-American Series, in which he finished fourth in the 1982 Mid-Atlantic Region season. Eventually, Silver joined the Busch Series in its inaugural season as an owner driver, and finished seventh in the Southeastern 150 at Bristol Motor Speedway. Silver ended the season fifteenth in points with 1,514, along with seven top-tens and two top-fives. In 1984, Silver was the car owner for Jack Ingram, who won the Busch 200 at Langley Speedway. In 1985, Silver claimed his first career NASCAR victory in the Bobby Isaac Memorial 200 at Hickory Motor Speedway; Silver won again at Hickory in 1986, this time in the Mountain Dew 400 after taking the lead from Jack Ingram with eleven laps left. In 1985 and 1986, Silver finished eighth (3268 points) and seventh (3927 points), respectively. In 1989, Silver's slow time trial for the All Pro 300 at Charlotte Motor Speedway relegated him to the forty-lap consolation race as a last chance to qualify for the event. However, Silver did not make the field. In 1992, Silver's team served Shawna Robinson at Daytona International Speedway, North Carolina Motor Speedway and Atlanta Motor Speedway, crashing at Daytona and Atlanta. The following season, Silver failed to qualify for The Pantry 300.

Later, Silver owned cars and served as crew chief for Michael Waltrip in the Busch Series, and currently works in the family auto body repair business. Eventually, Silver became the crew chief for Michael Waltrip Racing's Patty Moise in 1998 with engines supplied from Roush Racing, though in 2000, Silver worked less with the team due to business obligations in his hometown of Asheville, North Carolina.

== Motorsports career results ==
=== NASCAR ===
(key) (Bold – Pole position awarded by qualifying time. Italics – Pole position earned by points standings or practice time. * – Most laps led.)

==== Winston Cup Series ====
NASCAR Winston Cup Series results
Year	Team	No.	Make	1	2	3	4	5	6	7	8	9	10	11	12	13	14	15	16	17	18	19	20	21	22	23	24	25	26	27	28	29	NWCC	Pts	Ref
1988				DAY	RCH	CAR	ATL	DAR	BRI	NWS	MAR	TAL	CLT	DOV	RSD	POC	MCH	DAY	POC	TAL	GLN	MCH	BRI	DAR	RCH	DOV	MAR	CLT; DNQ	NWS	CAR	PHO	ATL	NA	-	

==== Busch Series ====
NASCAR Busch Series results
Year	Team	No.	Make	1	2	3	4	5	6	7	8	9	10	11	12	13	14	15	16	17	18	19	20	21	22	23	24	25	26	27	28	29	30	31	32	33	34	35	NBSC	Pts	Ref
1982	Silver Racing	12	Pontiac	DAY	RCH	BRI; 7																																	15th	1514	
1982	Silver Racing	14	Pontiac				MAR; 40	DAR	HCY; 7	SBO	CRW	RCH	LGY	DOV	HCY; 6		ASH; 4	HCY; 5	SBO	CAR	CRW	SBO	HCY; 18	LGY	IRP	BRI	HCY; 10	RCH	MAR		HCY; 19	MAR; 9							15th	1514	
1982	Silver Racing	17	Pontiac													CLT; 19																							15th	1514	
1982	Silver Racing	14	Olds																											CLT; 14									15th	1514	
1983	Silver Racing	14	Pontiac	DAY	RCH; 8		HCY; 5	MAR; 11			GPS; 12	LGY; 18	DOV; 14	BRI; 15	CLT; 11	SBO; 17	HCY; 10	ROU; 7	SBO; 9	ROU; 5	CRW; 8	ROU; 8	SBO; 13	HCY; 6	LGY; 12	IRP; 10	GPS; 5	BRI	HCY; 9		RCH; 18	NWS; 8	SBO; 3	MAR; 14	ROU		HCY; 4	MAR; 36	6th	4058	
1983	Silver Racing	61	Pontiac			CAR; 21																																	6th	4058	
1983	Silver Racing	14	Olds						NWS; 5	SBO; 18																					DAR; 35					CLT; 36			6th	4058	
1984	Silver Racing	14	Olds	DAY; 15	RCH	CAR; 10			DAR; 16						CLT; 10											DAR; 17	RCH		CLT; 41		CAR; 8								5th	3413	
1984	Silver Racing	14	Pontiac				HCY; 14	MAR; 20		ROU; 5	NSV; 10	LGY; 7	MLW; 18	DOV		SBO; 4	HCY; 3	ROU; 5	SBO; 26	ROU; 4	HCY; 4	IRP; 12		SBO; 11				NWS; 5		HCY; 6		MAR; 13							5th	3413	
1984	Lewis Motorsports	42	Pontiac																				LGY; 5																5th	3413	
1984	Sprinkle Racing	17	Olds																						BRI; 13														5th	3413	
1985	Silver Racing	14	Olds	DAY; 36	CAR; 9				DAR; 9			DOV; 11	CLT; 15										DAR; 14				CLT; 17		CAR; 16										8th	3268	
1985	Silver Racing	14	Pontiac			HCY; 8	BRI; 3	MAR; 9		SBO; 17	LGY; 24			SBO; 8	HCY; 6	ROU; 18	IRP; 27	SBO; 8	LGY; 20	HCY; 1*	MLW; 16	BRI; 10		RCH; 11	NWS; 9	ROU; 14		HCY; 5		MAR; 10									8th	3268	
1986	Silver Racing	14	Olds	DAY; 24	CAR; 18				DAR; 15				DOV; 11	CLT; 21													DAR; 18		DOV; 14			CLT; 39							7th	3927	
1986	Silver Racing	14	Pontiac			HCY; 1	MAR; 23	BRI; 11		SBO; 3	LGY; 4	JFC; 4				HCY; 2	ROU; 22	IRP; 5	SBO; 9	RAL; 14	OXF; 16	SBO; 6	HCY; 4	LGY; 12	ROU; 20	BRI; 8		RCH; 5		MAR; 13	ROU; 4			MAR; 14					7th	3927	
1986	Reedy Racing	08	Pontiac												SBO; 14																								7th	3927	
1986		54	Pontiac																														CAR; 36						7th	3927	
1987	Silver Racing	14	Chevy	DAY; 16			DAR; 24				CLT; 18	DOV; 8														DOV; 17		CLT; 42	CAR; 39										17th	2719	
1987	Silver Racing	14	Pontiac		HCY; 22	MAR; 15		BRI; 14	LGY; 10	SBO; 11			IRP; 11	ROU; 6	JFC; 17	OXF; DNQ	SBO; 15	HCY; 23	RAL; 20	LGY; 19	ROU; 14	BRI; 21	JFC; 23		RCH; 26		MAR; 9			MAR; 29									17th	2719	
1987	Brolsma Racing	26	Pontiac																					DAR; 41															17th	2719	
1988	Silver Racing	14	Chevy	DAY; 16	HCY	CAR	MAR	DAR																															20th	2217	
1988	Silver Racing	14	Olds						BRI; 21	LNG; 10	NZH	SBO; 4	NSV; 8	CLT; 28	DOV			LVL; 7														CAR; 32	MAR; 17						20th	2217	
1988	Thomas Brothers Racing	00	Olds													ROU; 8	LAN; 9		MYB; 11		SBO; 10	HCY; 7	LNG; 11	IRP	ROU; 14	BRI; 13	DAR	RCH	DOV	MAR; 22	CLT								20th	2217	
1988	Silver Racing	14	Pontiac																	OXF; DNQ																			20th	2217	
1989	Bahari Racing	03	Pontiac	DAY	CAR	MAR	HCY; 26	DAR	BRI	NZH																				CLT; DNQ	CAR; 37	MAR							31st	1155	
1989	Bahari Racing	30	Pontiac								SBO; 9	LAN; 25	NSV; 6	CLT	DOV	ROU; 5	LVL	VOL; 9	MYB; 24	SBO	HCY; 20	DUB	IRP	ROU; 5	BRI	DAR	RCH	DOV	MAR										31st	1155	
1993				DAY	CAR	RCH	DAR	BRI	HCY	ROU	MAR	NZH	CLT	DOV	MYB	GLN	MLW	TAL	IRP	MCH	NHA	BRI	DAR	RCH	DOV	ROU	CLT	MAR	CAR	HCY; DNQ	ATL								NA	-	

=== ARCA Talladega SuperCar Series ===
(key) (Bold – Pole position awarded by qualifying time. Italics – Pole position earned by points standings or practice time. * – Most laps led.)

ARCA Talladega SuperCar Series results
Year	Team	No.	Make	1	2	3	4	5	6	7	8	9	10	11	12	13	14	ATSCC	Pts	Ref
1985	Silver Racing	14	Pontiac	ATL	DAY	ATL	TAL	ATL	SSP	IRP; 27	CSP	FRS	IRP	OEF	ISF	DSF	TOL	123rd	-	
