= Eddie Falk =

American stock car racing driver

- Born: October 12, 1959 (age 67); Norfolk, Virginia, U.S.

NASCAR O'Reilly Auto Parts Series career
- 98 races run over 6 years
- Best finish: 9th
- First race: 1982 Dogwood 500 (Martinsville)
- Last race: 1987 Busch 200 (Langley)
Wins	Top tens	Poles
0	24	1

Eddie Falk (born October 12, 1959) is an American former stock car racing driver from Norfolk, Virginia. Falk competed in 98 NASCAR Busch Series races from 1982 to 1987. Falk completed his NASCAR career with 24 top-ten finishes and one pole position. Falk competed in one ARCA race in 1985 at Indianapolis Raceway Park. He also attempted one NASCAR Winston Cup race in 1981 at Martinsville Speedway, but he failed to qualify for the event.

His son C. E. Falk also competed in NASCAR.

== Motorsports career results ==
=== NASCAR ===
(key) (Bold – Pole position awarded by qualifying time. Italics – Pole position earned by points standings or practice time. * – Most laps led.)

==== Winston Cup Series ====
NASCAR Winston Cup Series results
Year	Team	No.	Make	1	2	3	4	5	6	7	8	9	10	11	12	13	14	15	16	17	18	19	20	21	22	23	24	25	26	27	28	29	30	31	NWCC	Pts	Ref
1981	Falk Racing	09	Pontiac	RSD	DAY	RCH	CAR	ATL	BRI	NWS	DAR	MAR	TAL	NSV	DOV	CLT	TWS	RSD	MCH	DAY	NSV	POC	TAL	MCH	BRI	DAR	RCH	DOV	MAR; DNQ	NWS	CLT	CAR	ATL	RSD	NA	-	

=== ARCA Talladega SuperCar Series ===
(key) (Bold – Pole position awarded by qualifying time. Italics – Pole position earned by points standings or practice time. * – Most laps led.)

ARCA Talladega SuperCar Series results
Year	Team	No.	Make	1	2	3	4	5	6	7	8	9	10	11	12	13	14	ATSCC	Pts	Ref
1985	Falk Racing	04	Pontiac	ATL	DAY	ATL	TAL	ATL	SSP	IRP	CSP	FRS	IRP; 14	OEF	ISF	DSF	TOL	86th	-	
