= Jack Ingram (racing driver) =

American racing driver (1936–2021)

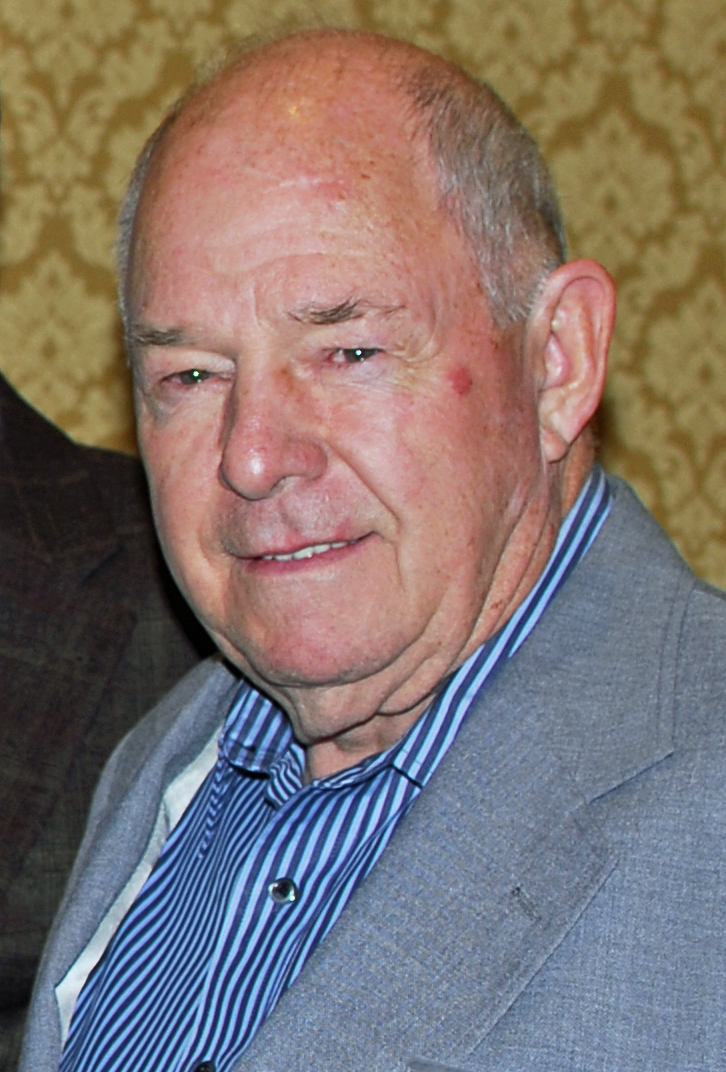
- Ingram in 2011
- Born: December 28, 1936; Asheville, North Carolina, U.S.
- Died: June 25, 2021 (aged 84)
- Achievements: 1972 Late Model Sportsman Division Champion; 1973 Late Model Sportsman Division Champion; 1974 Late Model Sportsman Division Champion; 1982 Budweiser Late Model Sportsman Series Champion; 1985 Busch Grand National Series Champion; Led Busch Grand National Series in wins (1982, 1985, 1986)
- Awards: 1982 Busch Grand National Series Most Popular Driver; Named one of NASCAR's 50 Greatest Drivers (1998); International Motorsports Hall of Fame (2007); NASCAR Hall of Fame (2014); Named one of NASCAR's 75 Greatest Drivers (2023)

NASCAR Cup Series career
- 19 races run over 6 years
- Best finish: 47th (1981)
- First race: 1965 Buddy Shuman 250 (Hickory)
- Last race: 1981 National 500 (Charlotte)
Wins	Top tens	Poles
0	4	0

NASCAR O'Reilly Auto Parts Series career
- 275 races run over 10 years
- Best finish: 1st (1982, 1985)
- First race: 1982 Goody's 300 (Daytona)
- Last race: 1991 Kroger 200 (IRP)
- First win: 1982 Mountain Dew 300 (Hickory)
- Last win: 1987 Mountain Dew 400 (Hickory)
Wins	Top tens	Poles
31	164	5
- Statistics up to date as of April 10, 2013.

Robert Jack Ingram (December 28, 1936 – June 25, 2021) was an American NASCAR Busch Series race car driver. Nicknamed the "Iron Man", during eight seasons in the Busch Series, he won 31 races and five poles, as well as the 1982 and 1985 championships. Unlike most younger competitors, Ingram won his 31 races between the age of 45 and age fifty.

== Career ==
During most of his time in the series he drove the Skoal Bandit car (1984–1991). Throughout his Busch Series career he almost always raced in the No. 11 car. During the 1986 season, Ingram was suspended for two races by NASCAR after ramming a driver during a race in Asheville, North Carolina at the New Asheville Speedway.

Ingram got his start at the New Asheville Speedway, and there he was a marquee driver along with rival Bob Pressley.

After his NBS retirement in 1991, he held the record for the most wins in the Busch Series, until it was broken by Mark Martin in 1997. As of August 17, 2019, he is currently sixth in career wins in the series.

Prior to the inauguration of the Busch Series in 1982, Ingram had won three consecutive Late Model Sportsman Championships in 1972, 1973 and 1974.

In 2007, Ingram was inducted into the International Motorsports Hall of Fame.

In 2013, Ingram was nominated into the NASCAR Hall of Fame, and was inducted the following year.

== Death ==
Ingram died on June 25, 2021, at the age of 84.

== Motorsports career results ==
=== NASCAR ===
(key) (Bold – Pole position awarded by qualifying time. Italics – Pole position earned by points standings or practice time. * – Most laps led.)

==== Grand National Series ====
NASCAR Grand National Series results
Year	Team	No.	Make	1	2	3	4	5	6	7	8	9	10	11	12	13	14	15	16	17	18	19	20	21	22	23	24	25	26	27	28	29	30	31	32	33	34	35	36	37	38	39	40	41	42	43	44	45	46	47	48	49	50	51	52	53	54	55	NGNC	Pts	Ref
1965	Langley Racing	64	Ford	RSD	DAY	DAY	DAY	PIF	ASW	RCH	HBO	ATL	GPS	NWS	MAR	CLB	BRI	DAR	LGY	BGS	HCY	CLT	CCF	ASH	HAR	NSV	BIR	ATL	GPS	MBS	VAL	DAY	ODS	OBS	ISP	GLN	BRI	NSV	CCF	AWS	SMR	PIF	AUG	CLB	DTS	BLV	BGS	DAR	HCY; 26	LIN	ODS	RCH	MAR	NWS	CLT	HBO	CAR	DTS	140th	16	
1966	Emory Gilliam	00	Dodge	AUG	RSD	DAY	DAY	DAY	CAR	BRI	ATL	HCY	CLB	GPS	BGS	NWS	MAR	DAR	LGY	MGR	MON	RCH	CLT	DTS	ASH; 19	PIF	SMR	AWS	BLV	GPS	DAY	ODS	BRR	OXF	FON	ISP	BRI	SMR	NSV	ATL	CLB	AWS	BLV	BGS	DAR	HCY	RCH	HBO	MAR	NWS	CLT	CAR							112th	112	
1967	Ingram Racing	81	Chevy	AUG	RSD	DAY	DAY	DAY	AWS	BRI; 30	GPS	BGS	ATL	CLB	HCY	NWS	MAR	SVH	RCH	DAR	BLV	LGY	CLT	ASH; 12	MGR	SMR	BIR	CAR	GPS	MGY	DAY	TRN	OXF	FDA	ISP	BRI	SMR	NSV	ATL	BGS	CLB	SVH	DAR	HCY; 2	RCH	BLV	HBO	MAR	NWS; 26	CLT	CAR	AWS							87th	694	
1968	Roy Tyner	09	Chevy	MGR	MGY	RSD	DAY	BRI; 7	RCH	ATL																																																	63rd	-	
1968	Ingram Racing	0	Chevy								HCY; 7	GPS	CLB																																														63rd	-	
1968	Giachetti Brothers Racing	08	Chevy											NWS; 33			AWS; 25	DAR	BLV	LGY	CLT	ASH	MGR	SMR	BIR	CAR	GPS	DAY	ISP	OXF	FDA	TRN	BRI	SMR	NSV	ATL	CLB	BGS	AWS	SBO	LGY	DAR	HCY	RCH	BLV	HBO	MAR	NWS	AUG	CLT	CAR	JFC							63rd	-	
1968	Ingram Racing	09	Chevy												MAR; DNQ	AUG																																											63rd	-	

==== Winston Cup Series ====
NASCAR Winston Cup Series results
Year	Team	No.	Make	1	2	3	4	5	6	7	8	9	10	11	12	13	14	15	16	17	18	19	20	21	22	23	24	25	26	27	28	29	30	31	NWCC	Pts	Ref
1979	Kennie Childers Racing	12	Olds	RSD	DAY	CAR	RCH	ATL	NWS	BRI	DAR	MAR	TAL	NSV	DOV	CLT	TWS	RSD	MCH	DAY	NSV	POC	TAL; 35	MCH		DAR; 30	RCH	DOV	MAR						64th	219	
1979	Kennie Childers Racing	12	Chevy																						BRI; 25					CLT; 36	NWS	CAR	ATL	ONT	64th	219	
1981	Bobby Hawkins Racing	13	Ford	RSD	DAY	RCH	CAR	ATL	BRI	NWS	DAR	MAR	TAL	NSV	DOV	CLT; 34	TWS	RSD	MCH	DAY; 37	NSV	POC	TAL; 38	MCH	BRI	DAR; 32	RCH	DOV	MAR	NWS	CLT; 9	CAR	ATL	RSD	47th	377	
1984	Junior Johnson & Associates	92	Chevy	DAY; DNQ	RCH	CAR	ATL	BRI	NWS	DAR	MAR	TAL	NSV	DOV	CLT	RSD	POC	MCH	DAY	NSV	POC	TAL	MCH	BRI	DAR	RCH	DOV	MAR	CLT	NWS	CAR	ATL	RSD		NA	-	

===== Daytona 500 =====
Year	Team	Manufacturer	Start	Finish
1984	Junior Johnson & Associates	Chevrolet	DNQ	

==== Busch Series ====
NASCAR Busch Series results
Year	Team	No.	Make	1	2	3	4	5	6	7	8	9	10	11	12	13	14	15	16	17	18	19	20	21	22	23	24	25	26	27	28	29	30	31	32	33	34	35	NBSC	Pts	Ref
1982	Ingram Racing	11	Pontiac	DAY; 31	RCH; 22	BRI; 4	MAR; 3	DAR; 4	HCY; 1	**SBO**; 2	CRW; 14	RCH; 4	LGY; 1	DOV; 2	HCY; 3	CLT; 17	ASH; 1	HCY; 4	SBO; 4	CAR; 4	CRW; 1	SBO; 2	HCY; 3	LGY; 2	IRP; 5	BRI; 1	HCY; 1	RCH; 6	MAR; 5	CLT; 5	HCY; 1	MAR; 26							1st	4495	
1983	Ingram Racing	11	Olds	DAY; 38		CAR; 8	HCY; 6			SBO; 22			DOV; 27																	**DAR**; 3						CLT; 13			2nd	5367	
1983	Ingram Racing	11	Pontiac		RCH; 4			MAR; 3	NWS; 6		GPS; 1*	LGY; 1*		BRI; 13	CLT; 6	SBO; 3	HCY; 2	ROU; 1*	SBO; 2	ROU; 2	CRW; 2	ROU; 2	SBO; 2	HCY; 2	LGY; 1	IRP; 20	GPS; 3	BRI; 2	HCY; 2		RCH; 7	NWS; 6*	SBO; 2	MAR; 5	ROU; 4		HCY; 1	MAR; 3	2nd	5367	
1984	Ingram Racing	11	Olds	DAY; 31		CAR; 2			DAR; 5					DOV; 3	CLT; 35											DAR; 29			CLT; 18		CAR; 20								2nd	4126	
1984	Ingram Racing	11	Pontiac		RCH; 5		HCY; 1*	MAR; 1		ROU; 1	NSV; 1	LGY; 2	MLW; 8			SBO; 2	HCY; 16	ROU; 1*	SBO; 2	ROU; 1	HCY; 1	IRP; 6		SBO; 21			RCH; 27	NWS; 3		HCY; 2		MAR; 15							2nd	4126	
1984	Silver Racing	14	Pontiac																				LGY; 1*		BRI; 27														2nd	4126	
1985	Ingram Racing	11	Olds	DAY; 7	CAR; 21				DAR; 1			**DOV**; 3	CLT; 14										DAR; 30				CLT; 6		CAR; 10										1st	4106	
1985	Ingram Racing	11	Pontiac			HCY; 2	BRI; 17	MAR; 6		SBO; 2	LGY; 3			SBO; 4	HCY; 3*	**ROU**; 2	IRP; 7	SBO; 1	LGY; 2	HCY; 23	MLW; 1	BRI; 4		RCH; 4	NWS; 1*	ROU; 1		HCY; 2*		MAR; 5									1st	4106	
1986	Ingram Racing	11	Pontiac	DAY; 6		**HCY**; 2*	MAR; 25	BRI; 5		SBO; 1*	LGY; 2	JFC; 3		CLT; 6	SBO; 1*	HCY; 4	ROU; 3	IRP; 3	SBO; 1	RAL; 19	OXF; 4	SBO; 1*	HCY; 1	LGY; 3	ROU; 19	BRI; 25		RCH; 9						MAR; 8					3rd	4281	
1986	Ingram Racing	11	Olds		CAR; 2*				DAR; 8				DOV; 2														DAR; 6		DOV; 15	MAR	ROU	CLT; 15	CAR; 31						3rd	4281	
1987	Ingram Racing	11	Chevy	DAY; 8			DAR; 6	BRI; 2	LGY; 7	SBO; 9	CLT; 4	DOV; 17	IRP; 3	ROU; 13	JFC; 18	OXF; 18	SBO; 5	HCY; 25	RAL; 7	LGY; 12	ROU; 12	BRI; 9	JFC; 16	DAR; 8	RCH; 21	DOV; 18	MAR; 18	CLT; 25	CAR; 10	MAR; 20									4th	3546	
1987	Ingram Racing	11	Pontiac		HCY; 1*	MAR; 4																																	4th	3546	
1988	Ingram Racing	11	Chevy	DAY; 25	HCY; 3	CAR; 23	MAR; 5	DAR; 25	BRI; 3	LNG; 3	NZH; 4	SBO; 23	NSV; 2	CLT; 19	DOV; 25	ROU; 24	LAN; 19	LVL; 22	MYB; 5	OXF; 8	SBO; 4	HCY; 4	LNG; 2	IRP; 35	ROU; 11	BRI; 22	DAR; 18	RCH; 28	DOV; 9	MAR; 35	CLT; 28	CAR; 34	MAR; 13						10th	3485	
1989	Ingram Racing	11	Chevy	DAY; 7	CAR; 7	MAR; 13	HCY; 4	DAR; 12	BRI; 22	NZH; 8	SBO; 2	LAN; 5	NSV; 4	CLT; 8	DOV; 15	ROU; 12	LVL; 14	VOL; 5	MYB; 2	SBO; 15	HCY; 3	DUB; 8	IRP; 19	ROU; 28	BRI; 12	DAR; 14	RCH; 6	DOV; 19	MAR; 21	CLT; 29	CAR; 19	MAR; 7							5th	3802	
1990	Ingram Racing	11	Chevy	DAY; 29	RCH; 21	CAR; 16	MAR; DNQ	HCY; 7	DAR; 16	BRI; 14	LAN; 14	SBO; 8	NZH; 18	HCY; 26	CLT; DNQ	DOV; 10	ROU; 3	VOL; 7	MYB; 30	OXF; 13	NHA; 18	SBO; 15	DUB; 21	IRP; 36	ROU; 25	BRI; DNQ	DAR; 39	RCH; 20	DOV; 33	MAR; 30	CLT; 14	NHA; 40	CAR; 36	MAR; 5					18th	2902	
1991	Ingram Racing	11	Chevy	DAY; 29	RCH; 35	CAR; 40	MAR; 28	VOL	HCY; DNQ	DAR	BRI; DNQ	LAN; 14	SBO; 16	NZH	CLT; 40	DOV	ROU; 29	HCY; 28	MYB; DNQ	GLN	OXF	NHA	SBO; 5	DUB; 22	IRP; 9	ROU	BRI	DAR	RCH	DOV	CLT; DNQ	NHA	CAR	MAR					36th	1080	

=== ARCA Talladega SuperCar Series ===
(key) (Bold – Pole position awarded by qualifying time. Italics – Pole position earned by points standings or practice time. * – Most laps led.)

ARCA Talladega SuperCar Series results
Year	Team	No.	Make	1	2	3	4	5	6	7	8	9	10	11	12	13	14	ATCSC	Pts	Ref
1985	Ingram Racing	11	Pontiac	ATL	DAY	ATL	TAL	ATL	SSP	IRP; 7	CSP	FRS	IRP	OEF	ISF	DSF	TOL	101st	-	

Preceded by Inaugural	NASCAR Budweiser Late Model Sportsman Champion; 1982	Succeeded by Sam Ard

Preceded by Sam Ard	NASCAR Busch Series Champion; 1985	Succeeded by Larry Pearson
