= Bosco Lowe =

American racing driver

- Born: March 27, 1943 (age 83); Fairview, Buncombe County, North Carolina, U.S.
- Achievements: 1970 Augusta Speedway Sportsman Champion; 1977 North Carolina Sportsman Champion

NASCAR Cup Series career
- 7 races run over 5 years
- Best finish: 91st (1968)
- First race: 1967 Hickory 100 (Hickory)
- Last race: 1985 Talladega 500 (Talladega)
Wins	Top tens	Poles
0	1	0

NASCAR O'Reilly Auto Parts Series career
- 133 races run over 7 years
- Best finish: 12th (1984)
- First race: 1982 Goody's 300 (Daytona)
- Last race: 1988 Winston Classic (Martinsville)
Wins	Top tens	Poles
0	36	0

Bosco Lowe (born March 27, 1943) is an American former stock car racing and ARCA driver who mainly competed in the NASCAR Busch Grand National Series, as well as its predecessors, the Sportsman Division, and the Late Model Sportsman Division.

== Biography ==
Lowe mainly competed in the Busch Series, but he did compete in seven Winston Cup Series races. His first race was the 1967 Hickory 100 at Hickory Speedway. It was in this race that he recorded his only career top-ten finish. He gained some fame in the 1983 Daytona 500, when he spun his car on pit road and slid down along the pit wall. He competed in 133 Busch Series races and recorded 36 top-ten finishes. His best career finish was a second place in 1982. Lowe retired from driving in 1988. Lowe was also an accomplished ARCA driver from 1984 to 1985. During the 1985 season, he scored three top-five finishes, six top-ten finishes, and finished sixth overall. After racing, he ran Bosco Lowe Enterprises, an auto wrecking yard and sheet metal company.
