= 1981 Budweiser NASCAR 400 =

Auto race held at Texas World Speedway in 1981

Coordinates: 30.537°N 96.221°W

Race details
- Race 14 of 31 in the 1981 NASCAR Winston Cup Series season
- Layout of Texas World Speedway
- Date: June 7, 1981
- Official name: Texas 400
- Location: Texas World Speedway, College Station, Texas
- Course: Permanent racing facility
- Course length: 3.218 km (2.000 miles)
- Distance: 250 laps, 400 mi (404 km)
- Weather: Extremely hot with temperatures of 91 °F (33 °C); wind speeds of 12.8 miles per hour (20.6 km/h)
- Average speed: 132.475 miles per hour (213.198 km/h)
- Attendance: 18,000

Pole position
Driver	Terry Labonte	Hagan Enterprises

Most laps led
Driver	Dale Earnhardt	Osterlund Motorsports
- Laps: 96

Winner
No. 15	Benny Parsons	Bud Moore Engineering

Television in the United States
- Network: untelevised
- Announcers: none

The 1981 Budweiser NASCAR 400 was a NASCAR Winston Cup Series racing event that took place on June 7, 1981, at Texas World Speedway in College Station, Texas.

== Background ==
Texas World Speedway was built in 1969 and was one of seven superspeedways of two miles (3 km) or greater in the United States used for racing, the others being Indianapolis, Daytona, Pocono, Talladega, Auto Club, and Michigan (there are several tracks of similar size used for vehicle testing). TWS was located on approximately 600 acres (2.4 km^{2}) on State Highway 6 in College Station, Texas. There is a 2-mile (3 km) oval, and several road course configurations. The full oval configuration was closely related to that of Michigan and is often considered the latter's sister track, though featuring steeper banking, at 22 degrees in the turns, 12 degrees at the start/finish line, and 2 degrees along the backstretch, compared to Michigan's respective 18, 12, and 5 degrees. The last professional race occurred at the track in 1981. The track was used by amateur racing clubs such as the SCCA, NASA, Porsche Club of America, Corinthian Vintage Auto Racing, CMRA, driving schools and car clubs, as well as hosting music concerts and the like. The speedway was also a race track location for the video game, Need for Speed: Pro Street.

During the 1980s the track fell into a state of disrepair, and both NASCAR and the Indy cars chose to drop it from their respective schedules. It continued to operate in a limited role for amateur racing. It is currently being dismantled.

== Race report ==
34 drivers qualified for this 200-lap race; with Baxter Price, Kirk Shelmerdine and D.K. Ulrich retiring early. Morgan Shepherd's vehicle developed a problematic radiator on lap 17 while a faulty cylinder head forced Darrell Waltrip out of the race on lap 33.

The track was evidently in horrible shape even then. It had rained non-stop for the two days prior to the race, and a couple of drivers spun and got stuck in the mud. Kyle Petty's engine stopped working on lap 34; the wreckers could not get to him for fear of getting stuck. Rick Newsom inflicted terminal vehicle damage on lap 40. Engine problems would claim the cars of Roger Hamby on lap 72 in addition to Bobby Wawak on lap 92 and James Hylton on lap 115. Ricky Rudd's engine stopped working on lap 122 while Terry Labonte was involved in a crash on lap 131. Before Labonte's crash, he had put on a daring move to barely beat leaders Parsons and Earnhardt to the line to get back on the lead lap. Randy Ogden lost the rear end of his vehicle on lap 137 while Rick Baldwin fell out with engine failure on lap 149.

It was a battle between Benny Parsons and Dale Earnhardt over the last 90 laps. The lead was traded between them 16 times with Parsons coming out on top; beating the Intimidator by more than half a second. All of the drivers were born in the United States of America. Only three drivers remained on the lead lap at the end of the race: Benny Parsons, Dale Earnhardt, and Bobby Allison. Eighteen thousand people would see 35 different lead changes. Regardless of the problems that the drivers faced during the race and the resulting separation of the field at the finish, there was still tight competition for the lead throughout the entire race.

Other notable participants at the race were: Richard Petty, J.D. McDuffie, Richard Childress, Terry Labonte, Ricky Rudd, and Kyle Petty. Crashes and engine problems also made up the bulk of the drivers who failed to finish. The winner received $22,750 in total winnings ($78,684 when considering inflation) while last-place finisher Baxter Price received $900 ($3,113 when considering inflation).

Notable crew chiefs for this event included Junie Donlavey, Joey Arrington, Darel Dieringer, Elmo Langley, Travis Carter, Waddell Wilson, Jabe Thomas, Tim Brewer, and Kirk Shelmerdine.

The total purse for this event was $179,075 ($619,356 when considering inflation).

=== Top 10 finishers ===
Pos	Grid	No.	Driver	Manufacturer	Laps	Winnings	Laps led	Points	Time/Status
1	4	15	Benny Parsons	Ford	200	$22,750	58	180	3:01:10
2	3	2	Dale Earnhardt	Pontiac	200	$18,650	96	180	+0.51 seconds
3	2	28	Bobby Allison	Buick	200	$14,650	17	170	Lead lap under green flag
4	5	43	Richard Petty	Buick	199	$12,550	0	160	+1 lap
5	13	71	Dave Marcis	Buick	198	$8,935	0	155	+2 laps
6	6	90	Jody Ridley	Ford	198	$8,610	1	155	+2 laps
7	16	99	Tim Richmond	Oldsmobile	196	$6,840	0	146	+4 laps
8	14	66	Lake Speed	Oldsmobile	196	$5,630	4	147	+4 laps
9	12	6	Joe Ruttman	Buick	195	$3,100	3	143	+5 laps
10	7	33	Harry Gant	Pontiac	193	$2,700	4	139	+7 laps

== Standings after the race ==
Pos	Driver	Points	Differential
1	Bobby Allison	2256	0
2	Ricky Rudd	1984	-272
3	Darrell Waltrip	1915	-341
4	Harry Gant	1890	-366
5	Dale Earnhardt	1848	-408
6	Jody Ridley	1817	-439
7	Terry Labonte	1750	-506
8	Richard Petty	1711	-545
9 ▲	Benny Parsons	1634	-622
10 ▼	Buddy Arrington	1615	-641

Preceded by 1981 World 600	NASCAR Winston Cup Series Season; 1981	Succeeded by 1981 Warner W. Hodgdon 400
