= NASCAR Busch Series at Hickory Motor Speedway =

NASCAR Busch Series
- Venue: Hickory Motor Speedway
- Location: Newton, North Carolina, United States

Circuit information
- Surface: Asphalt
- Length: 0.363 mi (0.584 km)
- Turns: 4

Stock car racing events in the NASCAR Busch Series were held at Hickory Motor Speedway. The track held two races annually between 1982 and 1998.

== First race ==
Galaxy Food Centers 300
NASCAR Busch Series
- Venue: Hickory Motor Speedway
- First race: 1982
- Last race: 1998
- Distance: 108.9 miles (175.3 km)
- Laps: 300
- Previous names: Mountain Dew 300 (1982); Mello Yello 200 (1983); Mountain Dew 200 (1984); Mountain Dew 400 (1985-1993); Sundrop 400 (1994-1995); Sundrop 300 (1996); Galaxy Foods 300 (1997); Galaxy Food Centers 300 (1998)

The Galaxy Food Centers 300 was a NASCAR Busch Series stock car race held at Hickory Motor Speedway, a .363-mile (0.584 km) paved oval track located in Hickory, North Carolina. One of the inaugural events of the Busch Series from its 1982 season, it was one of five races the series ran at the track in 1982, four from 1983 to 1985, three in 1986 and, from 1987 to 1994, was the series' first of two annual visits to the track; from 1995 to 1998 it was the only visit to the track by the series annually. until Hickory Motor Speedway departed the series schedule after the 1998 season. The race distance was 300 laps (108.9 miles (175.3 km)) in 1982 and from 1992 to 1998, 200 laps (72.6 miles (116.8 km)) from 1983 to 1990, and 276 laps (100.2 miles (161.3 km)) in 1992.

Jack Ingram won the event three times, the most of any driver; his 1987 victory in the race would prove to be the final win of his Busch Series career. Tommy Houston won the event twice, his victory in 1992 being the final win of his Busch Series career. The 1992 running of the event was marred by track damage from poorly cured asphalt, resulting in 132 of the race's 300 laps being run under the yellow flag; both the number of caution laps and the 26 caution periods set all-time NASCAR records. Jimmy Spencer scored his first career Busch Series victory in the 1989 Mountain Dew 400; the final running of the race, the 1998 Galaxy Food Centers 300, was the first and only career Busch Series victory for Ed Berrier.

=== Past winners ===
Year	Date	Driver	Team	Manufacturer	Race Distance		Race Time	Average Speed (mph)
Year	Date	Driver	Team	Manufacturer	Laps	Miles (km)	Race Time	Average Speed (mph)
1982	April 10	Jack Ingram	Jack Ingram Racing	Pontiac	300	108.9 (1175.26)	n/a	n/a
1983	March 13	Tommy Ellis	Ellis Racing	Pontiac	200	72.6 (116.84)	n/a	50.967
1984	March 11	Jack Ingram	Jack Ingram Racing	Pontiac	200	72.6 (116.84)	0:59:08	73.664
1985	March 10	Jimmy Hensley	Thomas Brothers Racing	Oldsmobile	200	72.6 (116.84)	0:57:32	75.712
1986	March 9	Ronnie Silver	Silver Racing	Pontiac	200	72.6 (116.84)	0:59:47	72.863
1987	March 15	Jack Ingram	Jack Ingram Racing	Pontiac	200	72.6 (116.84)	0:47:04	86.206
1988	February 28	Mike Alexander	Alexander Motorsports	Buick	200	72.6 (116.84)	0:58:30	74.462
1989	March 25	Jimmy Spencer	Frank Cicci Racing	Buick	200	72.6 (116.84)	1:08:56	63.191
1990	March 25	Tommy Houston	Houston Racing	Buick	200	72.6 (116.84)	n/a	74.631
1991	March 31	Butch Miller	Day Enterprises	Chevrolet	276	100.2 (161.26)	1:43:22	88.184
1992	April 18	Tommy Houston	Houston Racing	Buick	300	108.9 (175.26)	2:01:20	53.852
1993	April 10	Steve Grissom	Grissom Racing Enterprises	Chevrolet	300	108.9 (175.26)	1:57:00	55.846
1994	April 3	Ricky Craven	Ricky Craven Motorsports	Chevrolet	300	108.9 (175.26)	1:43:24	63.191
1995	April 15	Johnny Benson Jr.	BACE Motorsports	Chevrolet	300	108.9 (175.26)	1:43:31	63.120
1996	April 6	David Green	American Equipment Racing	Chevrolet	300	108.9 (175.26)	1:48:19	60.323
1997	March 29	Dick Trickle	Shoemaker Racing	Chevrolet	300	108.9 (175.26)	1:50:40	59.042
1998	April 11	Ed Berrier	PRW Racing	Ford	300	108.9 (175.26)	1:49:22	59.744

== Second race ==
The Pantry 300
NASCAR Busch Series
- Venue: Hickory Motor Speedway
- First race: 1982
- Last race: 1994
- Distance: 108.9 miles (175.3 km)
- Laps: 300
- Previous names: Bobby Isaac Memorial 200 (1982–1987); Pepsi 200 (1988–1989); Granger Select 200 (1990); Granger Select 400 (1991); The Pantry 300 (1992–1994)

The Pantry 300 was a NASCAR Busch Series stock car race held at Hickory Motor Speedway, in Hickory, North Carolina. One of the inaugural events of the series from its 1982 season, it was one of five races at the track in 1982, four in 1983 to 1985, three in 1986 and, from 1987 to 1994, was the series' second annual visit to the track, following which only the spring Sundrop 400 remained on the schedule until Hickory Motor Speedway departed the series schedule after the 1998 season. From 1982 to 1987, the second race was the Bobby Isaac Memorial race, which was an established Late Model race at Hickory; that race switched to weekly NASCAR classification in 1988 and remains to this day. The race distance was 200 laps (72.6 miles (116.8 km)) from 1982 to 1990, 276 laps (100.2 miles (161.3 km)) in 1991, and 300 laps (108.9 miles (175.3 km)) from 1992 to 1994. The race served as the series' season-ending event in 1992. Jack Ingram and Tommy Houston were the only multiple winners of the event, each winning twice; the final The Pantry 300 was won by Dennis Setzer, who in doing so became the first rookie in series history to win twice in his rookie season.

=== Past winners ===
Year	Date	Driver	Team	Manufacturer	Race Distance		Race Time	Average Speed (mph)
Year	Date	Driver	Team	Manufacturer	Laps	Miles (km)	Race Time	Average Speed (mph)
1982	September 4	Jack Ingram	Jack Ingram Racing	Pontiac	200	72.6 (116.84)	n/a	n/a
1983	September 3	Tommy Houston	Mason Day Racing	Chevrolet	200	72.6 (116.84)	n/a	60.231
1984	October 13	Larry Pearson	Pearson Racing	Pontiac	200	72.6 (116.84)	1:09:59	62.541
1985	August 10	Ronnie Silver	Silver Racing	Pontiac	200	72.6 (116.84)	1:01:34	70.752
1986	July 26	Jack Ingram	Jack Ingram Racing	Pontiac	200	72.6 (116.84)	1:04:06	67.395
1987	July 25	Dale Jarrett	DAJ Racing	Chevrolet	200	72.6 (116.84)	1:06:03	65.701
1988	July 23	Tommy Houston	Arndt Racing	Buick	200	72.6 (116.84)	1:01:06	70.619
1989	July 22	Tommy Ellis	J&J Racing	Buick	200	72.6 (116.84)	1:05:46	66.234
1990	May 19	Chuck Bown	Hensley Motorsports	Pontiac	200	72.6 (116.84)	1:00:53	71.546
1991	June 15	Jimmy Hensley	Beverly Racing	Oldsmobile	276	100.2 (161.26)	1:28:59	67.555
1992	November 8	Bobby Labonte	Labonte Motorsports	Chevrolet	300	108.9 (175.26)	1:42:25	55.648
1993	November 7	Johnny Rumley	Johnny Rumley	Oldsmobile	300	108.9 (175.26)	1:38:46	66.156
1994	July 31	Dennis Setzer	Alliance Motorsports	Chevrolet	300	108.9 (175.26)	1:38:49	66.122
