= NASCAR Nationwide Series at the Milwaukee Mile =

Former NASCAR Xfinity Series race

NorthernTool.com 250

NASCAR Nationwide Series
- Venue: Milwaukee Mile
- Location: West Allis, Wisconsin
- Corporate sponsor: Northern Tool + Equipment
- First race: 1984
- Last race: 2009
- Distance: 250 miles (402.336 km)
- Laps: 250
- Previous names: Red Carpet 200 (1984); Milwaukee Sentinel 200 (1985); Havoline 250 (1993–1994); Sears Auto Center 250 (1995–1997); DieHard 250 (1998–1999); Sears DieHard 250 (2000); GNC Live Well 250 (2001–2003); Alan Kulwicki 250 Pres. by Forest County Potawatomi Racing (2004); SBC 250 (2005); AT&T 250 (2006–2007); Camping World RV Rental 250 (2008); NorthernTool.com 250 (2009)
- Most wins (driver): Greg Biffle; Carl Edwards (2)
- Most wins (team): Roush Fenway Racing (4)
- Most wins (manufacturer): Chevrolet (9)

Circuit information
- Surface: Asphalt
- Length: 1 mi (1.6 km)
- Turns: 4

The NorthernTool.com 250 is a discontinued NASCAR Nationwide Series race held at the Milwaukee Mile. From 1984 to 1985, the race was 200 laps, 200 miles (321.9 km) long. From 1986 to 1992, no race was held. In 1993, the race returned, and was increased to 250 laps, 250 miles (402.3 km), a distance it would remain at until the final race was held in 2009. The race was traditionally held Sunday afternoons, while the Cup Series was either off or at a different venue, but starting in 2004, the race was run on Saturday night.

Until the race sponsor changed to Camping World in 2008, the sponsorship of this race was not affected by the September 7, 2007, settlement between AT&T and NASCAR in regard to a grandfathered sponsorship deal, as Anheuser-Busch, the sponsor of the series at the time of the lawsuit, was not associated with the wireless industry. The 2010 race was canceled and the Wisconsin date was moved north to Road America.

== Past winners ==
Year	Date	Driver	Team	Manufacturer	Race distance		Race time	Average speed (mph)	Report	Ref
Year	Date	Driver	Team	Manufacturer	Laps	Miles (km)	Race time	Average speed (mph)	Report	Ref
1984	May 13	Sam Ard	Thomas Brothers Racing	Oldsmobile	200	200 (321.868)	2:03:26	97.206	Report	
1985	Aug 18	Jack Ingram	Jack Ingram Racing	Pontiac	200	200 (321.868)	1:55:15	104.121	Report	
1986 – 1992	Not held									
1993	July 4	Steve Grissom	Grissom Racing Enterprises	Chevrolet	250	250 (402.336)	2:48:12	89.003	Report	
1994	July 3	Mike Wallace	Owen Racing	Chevrolet	250	250 (402.336)	2:28:31	100.999	Report	
1995	July 2	Dale Jarrett	Dale Jarrett	Ford	250	250 (402.336)	2:37:16	95.379	Report	
1996	July 7	Buckshot Jones	Buckshot Racing	Ford	250	250 (402.336)	3:02:24	82.237	Report	
1997	July 5	Randy LaJoie	BACE Motorsports	Chevrolet	250	250 (402.336)	2:31:18	99.141	Report	
1998	July 5	Dale Earnhardt Jr.	Dale Earnhardt, Inc.	Chevrolet	250	250 (402.336)	2:33:14	97.89	Report	
1999	July 4	Casey Atwood	Brewco Motorsports	Chevrolet	250	250 (402.336)	2:33:17	97.858	Report	
2000	July 2	Jeff Green	ppc Racing	Chevrolet	250	250 (402.336)	2:48:09	89.206	Report	
2001	July 1	Greg Biffle	Roush Racing	Ford	250	250 (402.336)	2:26:30	102.389	Report	
2002	June 30	Greg Biffle	Roush Racing	Ford	250	250 (402.336)	2:39:16	94.182	Report	
2003	June 29	Jason Keller	ppc Racing	Ford	250	250 (402.336)	2:25:30	103.093	Report	
2004	June 26	Ron Hornaday Jr.	Richard Childress Racing	Chevrolet	250	250 (402.336)	2:26:59	102.052	Report	
2005	June 25	Johnny Sauter	Phoenix Racing	Dodge	200*	200 (321.868)	2:03:12	97.403	Report	
2006	June 24	Paul Menard	Dale Earnhardt, Inc.	Chevrolet	258*	258 (415.21)	3:08:41	82.042	Report	
2007	June 23	Aric Almirola*	Joe Gibbs Racing	Chevrolet	250	250 (402.336)	2:56:03	85.203	Report	
2008	June 21	Carl Edwards	Roush Fenway Racing	Ford	250	250 (402.336)	2:43:37	91.678	Report	
2009	June 20	Carl Edwards	Roush Fenway Racing	Ford	250	250 (402.336)	2:26:01	102.728	Report	

- 2005: Race shortened due to rain.
- 2006: Race extended due to NASCAR overtime.
- 2007: Denny Hamlin finished the race in relief of Almirola (Hamlin was supposed to start but arrived late due to Cup Series commitments). Per NASCAR rules Almirola is credited with the victory and the points.
