= 1991 NASCAR Busch Series =

American motorsport season

Seasons
- ← 1990 1992 →

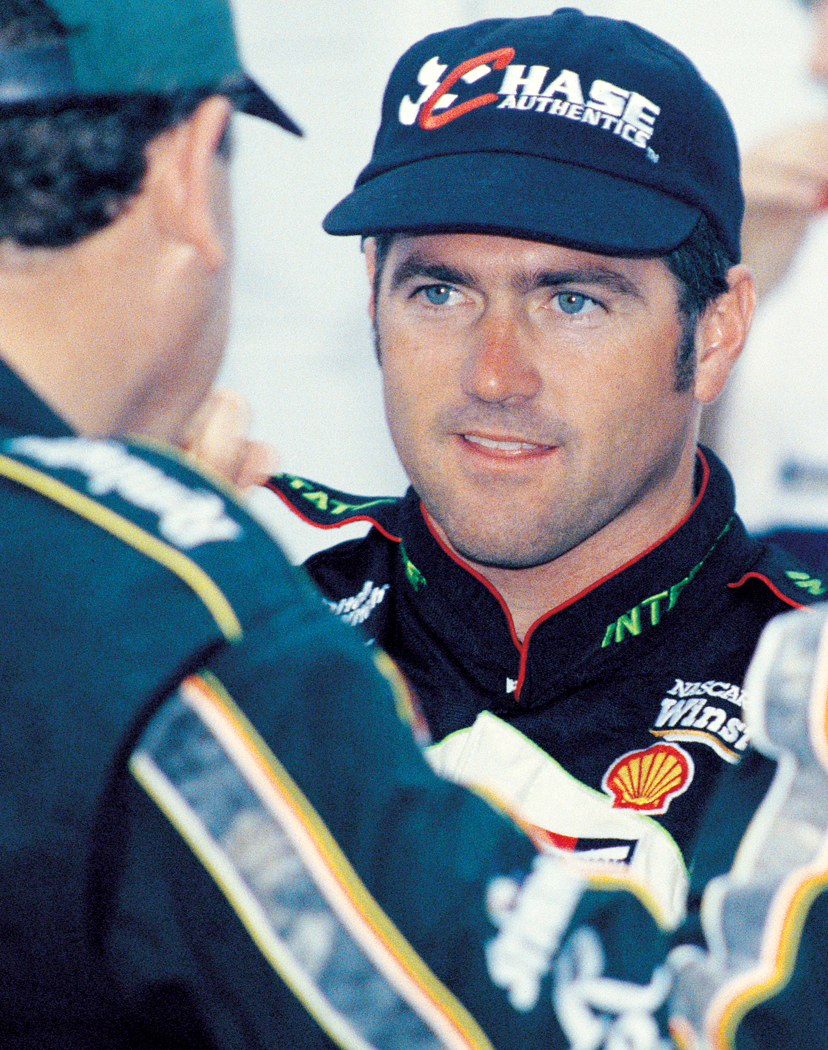
Bobby Labonte, the 1991 Busch Series champion

The 1991 NASCAR Busch Series began February 16, 1991 and ended on October 27,1991. Bobby Labonte of Labonte Motorsports won the championship.

== Races ==
=== Goody's 300 ===
The Goody's 300 was held February 16 at Daytona International Speedway. David Green won the pole.

Top ten results

1. #3-Dale Earnhardt
2. #30-Michael Waltrip
3. #28-Davey Allison
4. #15-Ken Schrader
5. #7-Harry Gant
6. #96-Tom Peck
7. #97-Morgan Shepherd
8. #45-Jimmy Spencer
9. #16-Randy MacDonald
10. #36-Kenny Wallace

=== Pontiac 200 ===
The Pontiac 200 was held February 23 at Richmond International Raceway. Jeff Burton won the pole.

Top ten results

1. #7-Harry Gant
2. #3-Dale Earnhardt
3. #36-Kenny Wallace
4. #32-Dale Jarrett
5. #30-Michael Waltrip
6. #97-Morgan Shepherd
7. #44-Bobby Labonte
8. #25-Jimmy Hensley
9. #87-Joe Nemechek
10. #28-Davey Allison

=== Goodwrench 200 ===
The Goodwrench 200 was held March 2 at North Carolina Speedway. Dale Earnhardt won the pole.

Top ten results

1. #32-Dale Jarrett
2. #36-Kenny Wallace
3. #3-Dale Earnhardt
4. #34-Todd Bodine
5. #7-Harry Gant
6. #44-Bobby Labonte
7. #5-Ed Berrier
8. #99-Jeff Burton
9. #59-Robert Pressley
10. #25-Jimmy Hensley

=== Miller Classic ===
The Miller Classic was held March 10 at Martinsville Speedway. Elton Sawyer won the pole.

Top ten results

1. #25-Jimmy Hensley
2. #32-Dale Jarrett
3. #36-Kenny Wallace
4. #44-Bobby Labonte
5. #27-Elton Sawyer
6. #31-Steve Grissom
7. #63-Chuck Bown
8. #6-Tommy Houston
9. #75-Ward Burton
10. #19-Cecil Eunice

=== Spring 200 ===
The Spring 200 was held March 24 at Volusia County Speedway. Chuck Bown won the pole.

Top ten results

1. #36-Kenny Wallace
2. #6-Tommy Houston
3. #52-Butch Miller
4. #25-Jimmy Hensley
5. #8-David Green
6. #86-Jeff Green
7. #44-Bobby Labonte
8. #34-Todd Bodine
9. #31-Steve Grissom
10. #63-Chuck Bown

=== Mountain Dew 400 ===
The Mountain Dew 400 was held March 31 at Hickory Motor Speedway. Jimmy Hensley won the pole.

Top ten results

1. #52-Butch Miller
2. #25-Jimmy Hensley
3. #87-Joe Nemechek
4. #15-Ken Schrader
5. #49-Ed Ferree
6. #59-Robert Pressley
7. #44-Bobby Labonte
8. #34-Todd Bodine
9. #08-Bobby Dotter
10. #96-Tom Peck

=== Pontiac 200 ===
The Pontiac 200 was held April 6 at Darlington Raceway. Jimmy Hensley won the pole.

Top ten results

1. #32-Dale Jarrett
2. #44-Bobby Labonte
3. #3-Dale Earnhardt
4. #29-Phil Parsons
5. #34-Todd Bodine
6. #25-Jimmy Hensley
7. #87-Joe Nemechek
8. #99-Jeff Burton
9. #1-Jeff Gordon
10. #96-Tom Peck

=== Budweiser 250 ===
The Budweiser 250 was held April 13 at Bristol Motor Speedway. Jeff Burton won the pole.

Top ten results

1. #44-Bobby Labonte
2. #8-David Green
3. #3-Dale Earnhardt
4. #45-Jimmy Spencer
5. #33-Ed Berrier
6. #23-Clifford Allison
7. #7-Harry Gant
8. #72-Tracy Leslie
9. #36-Kenny Wallace
10. #63-Chuck Bown

=== Nestle 200 ===
The Nestle 200 was held April 27 at Lanier Raceway. Robert Pressley won the pole.

Top ten results

1. #8-David Green
2. #1-Jeff Gordon
3. #18-Mike Wallace
4. #59-Robert Pressley
5. #63-Chuck Bown
6. #6-Tommy Houston
7. #99-Jeff Burton
8. #34-Todd Bodine
9. #56-Dave Mader III
10. #75-Ward Burton

=== Carquest 300 ===
The Carquest 300 was held May 4 at South Boston Speedway. Steve Grissom won the pole. This race was marred by the death of former track champion at Hickory Motor Speedway and New Asheville Speedway Gary Neice, who suffered a heart attack on Lap 201 and crashed into the wall in Turn 3.

Top ten results

1. #99-Jeff Burton
2. #87-Joe Nemechek
3. #33-Ed Berrier
4. #08-Bobby Dotter
5. #31-Steve Grissom
6. #44-Bobby Labonte
7. #27-Elton Sawyer
8. #96-Tom Peck
9. #79-Dave Rezendes
10. #34-Todd Bodine

=== Pontiac Pacesetters 200 ===
The Pontiac Pacesetters 200 was held May 11 at Pennsylvania International Raceway. Jimmy Hensley won the pole. Races in the Northeastern United States were declared combination Busch Series / Busch North Series races; drivers in both series participated in one race for points in both series.

Top ten results

1. #63-Chuck Bown
2. #31-Steve Grissom
3. #36-Kenny Wallace
4. #8-David Green
5. #1-Jeff Gordon
6. #18-Mike Wallace
7. #44-Bobby Labonte
8. #6-Tommy Houston
9. #25-Jimmy Hensley
10. #59-Robert Pressley

=== Champion 300 ===
The Champion 300 was held May 25 at Charlotte Motor Speedway. Jack Sprague won the pole.

Top ten results

1. #3-Dale Earnhardt
2. #92-Dick Trickle
3. #7-Harry Gant
4. #25-Jimmy Hensley
5. #48-Jack Sprague
6. #17-Darrell Waltrip
7. #6-Tommy Houston
8. #44-Bobby Labonte
9. #75-Ward Burton
10. #94-Terry Labonte

=== Budweiser 200 ===
The Budweiser 200 was held June 1 at Dover International Speedway. Dave Mader III won the pole.

Top ten results

1. #34-Todd Bodine*
2. #1-Jeff Gordon
3. #17-Darrell Waltrip
4. #75-Ward Burton
5. #44-Bobby Labonte
6. #28-Davey Allison
7. #25-Jimmy Hensley
8. #31-Steve Grissom
9. #96-Tom Peck
10. #87-Joe Nemechek
- This was Bodine's first career Busch Grand National victory.

=== Roses Stores 300 ===
The Roses Stores 300 was held June 8 at Orange County Speedway. Jeff Gordon won the pole.

Top ten results

1. #59-Robert Pressley
2. #25-Jimmy Hensley
3. #8-David Green
4. #36-Kenny Wallace
5. #99-Jeff Burton
6. #44-Bobby Labonte
7. #6-Tommy Houston
8. #96-Tom Peck
9. #1-Jeff Gordon
10. #49-Ed Ferree

=== Granger Select 400 ===
The Granger Select 400 was held June 15 at Hickory Motor Speedway. Chuck Bown won the pole.

Top ten results

1. #25-Jimmy Hensley
2. #1-Jeff Gordon
3. #44-Bobby Labonte
4. #33-Ed Berrier
5. #31-Steve Grissom
6. #59-Robert Pressley
7. #96-Tom Peck
8. #72-Tracy Leslie
9. #08-Bobby Dotter
10. #87-Joe Nemechek

=== Carolina Pride/Budweiser 250 ===
The Carolina Pride/Budweiser 250 was held June 22 at Myrtle Beach Speedway. Chuck Bown won the pole.

Top ten results

1. #63-Chuck Bown
2. #59-Robert Pressley
3. #31-Steve Grissom
4. #36-Kenny Wallace
5. #87-Joe Nemechek
6. #34-Todd Bodine
7. #96-Tom Peck
8. #75-Ward Burton
9. #8-David Green
10. #33-Ed Berrier

=== Fay's 150 ===
The inaugural Fay's 150 was held June 29 at Watkins Glen International Raceway. Terry Labonte won the pole. Races in the Northeastern United States were declared combination Busch Series / Busch North Series races; drivers in both series participated in one race for points in both series.

Top ten results

1. #94-Terry Labonte
2. #87-Joe Nemechek
3. #4-Ernie Irvan
4. #99-Jeff Burton
5. #34-Todd Bodine
6. #1-Jeff Gordon
7. #63-Chuck Bown
8. #75-Curtis Markham
9. #31-Steve Grissom
10. #8-David Green

=== True Value 250 ===
The True Value 250 was held July 7 at Oxford Plains Speedway. Billy Clark won the pole. Races in the Northeastern United States were declared combination Busch Series / Busch North Series races; drivers in both series participated in one race for points in both series.

Top ten results

1. #25N (#28)-Ricky Craven*
2. #6S-Tommy Houston
3. #34S-Todd Bodine
4. #72S-Tracy Leslie
5. #08S-Bobby Dotter
6. #99S-Jeff Burton
7. #44S-Bobby Labonte
8. #36S-Kenny Wallace
9. #31S-Steve Grissom
10. #87S-Joe Nemechek
- In combination races where multiple series participate, if two cars carried the same number, the faster qualified car earned the right to the number. (Ricky Craven and Jimmy Hensley both had #25, in the Busch North and Busch, respectively; Hensley was the quicker car, and ran the #25, registered as 25S; Craven ran the #28 but was registered as 25N for owner points standings in that series.)

=== Budweiser 300 ===
The Budweiser 300 was held July 14 at New Hampshire International Speedway. Jimmy Hensley won the pole.

Top ten results

1. #36-Kenny Wallace
2. #63-Chuck Bown
3. #31-Steve Grissom
4. #30-Michael Waltrip
5. #10-Ernie Irvan
6. #87-Joe Nemechek
7. #59-Robert Pressley
8. #8-David Green
9. #0-Dick McCabe
10. #16-Stub Fadden

=== Coors Light 300 ===
The Coors Light 300 was held July 20 at South Boston Speedway. Todd Bodine won the pole.

Top ten results

1. #31-Steve Grissom
2. #36-Kenny Wallace
3. #6-Tommy Houston
4. #96-Tom Peck
5. #11-Jack Ingram
6. #34-Todd Bodine
7. #67-Elton Sawyer
8. #5-Jay Fogleman
9. #25-Jimmy Hensley
10. #75-Butch Miller

=== Granger Select 200 ===
The Granger Select 200 was held July 27 at New River Valley Speedway. Todd Bodine won the pole.

Top ten results

1. #63-Chuck Bown
2. #36-Kenny Wallace
3. #59-Robert Pressley
4. #8-David Green
5. #6-Tommy Houston
6. #31-Steve Grissom
7. #25-Jimmy Hensley
8. #87-Joe Nemechek
9. #96-Tom Peck
10. #75-Butch Miller

=== Kroger 200 ===
The Kroger 200 was held August 3 at Indianapolis Raceway Park. Ward Burton won the pole.

Top ten results

1. #44-Bobby Labonte
2. #72-Tracy Leslie
3. #92-Dick Trickle
4. #63-Chuck Bown
5. #6-Tommy Houston
6. #97-Joe Nemechek
7. #32-Dale Jarrett
8. #33-Ed Berrier
9. #11-Jack Ingram*
10. #9-Troy Beebe

Failed to qualify: Mike Oliver (#28), John Linville (#62)

- This was Ingram's last career start.

=== Texas Pete 300 ===
The Texas Pete 300 was held August 10 at Orange County Speedway. Kenny Wallace won the pole.

Top ten results

1. #25-Jimmy Hensley
2. #59-Robert Pressley
3. #75-Butch Miller
4. #31-Steve Grissom
5. #63-Chuck Bown
6. #87-Joe Nemechek
7. #36-Kenny Wallace
8. #5-Jay Fogleman
9. #44-Bobby Labonte
10. #72-Tracy Leslie

=== Jay Johnson 250 ===
The Jay Johnson 250 was held August 23 at Bristol Motor Speedway. Chuck Bown won the pole.

Top ten results

1. #32-Dale Jarrett
2. #44-Bobby Labonte
3. #1-Jeff Gordon
4. #28-Davey Allison
5. #25-Jimmy Hensley
6. #36-Kenny Wallace
7. #59-Robert Pressley
8. #63-Chuck Bown
9. #99-Jeff Burton
10. #75-Butch Miller

=== Gatorade 200 ===
The Gatorade 200 was held August 31 at Darlington Raceway. Harry Gant won the pole.

Top ten results

1. #3-Dale Earnhardt
2. #30-Michael Waltrip
3. #34-Todd Bodine
4. #18-Dick Trickle
5. #44-Bobby Labonte
6. #17-Darrell Waltrip
7. #7-Harry Gant
8. #96-Tom Peck
9. #79-Dave Rezendes
10. #15-Ken Schrader

=== Autolite 200 ===
The Autolite 200 was held September 6 at Richmond International Raceway. Bobby Labonte won the pole.

Top ten results

1. #7-Harry Gant
2. #59-Robert Pressley
3. #32-Dale Jarrett
4. #30-Michael Waltrip
5. #97-Morgan Shepherd
6. #17-Darrell Waltrip
7. #3-Dale Earnhardt
8. #87-Joe Nemechek
9. #27-Ward Burton
10. #4-Ernie Irvan

=== SplitFire 200 ===
The SplitFire 200 was held September 14 at Dover Downs International Speedway. Butch Miller won the pole.

Top ten results

1. #7-Harry Gant
2. #59-Robert Pressley
3. #27-Ward Burton
4. #18-Dick Trickle
5. #17-Ken Schrader
6. #87-Joe Nemechek
7. #12-Tommy Ellis
8. #1-Jeff Gordon
9. #96-Tom Peck
10. #6-Tommy Houston

=== All Pro 300 ===
The All Pro 300 was held October 5 at Charlotte Motor Speedway. Ward Burton won the pole.

Top ten results

1. #7-Harry Gant
2. #15-Ken Schrader
3. #25-Jimmy Hensley
4. #12-Tommy Ellis
5. #96-Tom Peck
6. #17-Darrell Waltrip
7. #36-Kenny Wallace
8. #34-Todd Bodine
9. #29-Phil Parsons
10. #84-Bill Elliott

=== NE Chevy 250 ===
The NE Chevy 250 was held October 13 at New Hampshire International Speedway. Ricky Craven won the pole. Races in the Northeastern United States were declared combination Busch Series / Busch North Series races; drivers in both series participated in one race for points in both series.

Top ten results

1. #25N-Ricky Craven
2. #63S-Chuck Bown
3. #7S-Harry Gant
4. #44S-Bobby Labonte
5. #59S-Robert Pressley
6. #75S-Butch Miller
7. #99S-Jeff Burton
8. #41N-Jamie Aube
9. #47N-Kelly Moore
10. #0N-Dick McCabe

NOTE: Under NASCAR rules at the time, some Busch Series cars carried different numbers than usual; in combination Busch / Busch North races, if two cars carried the same number, the faster qualified car earned the right to the number. (Ricky Craven and Jimmy Hensley both had #25, in the Busch North and Busch, respectively; Hensley had to run #5 because #25 was given to Craven.)

=== AC-Delco 200 ===
The AC-Delco 200 was held October 19 at North Carolina Speedway. Ernie Irvan won the pole.

Top ten results

1. #10-Ernie Irvan
2. #32-Dale Jarrett
3. #36-Kenny Wallace
4. #87-Joe Nemechek
5. #7-Harry Gant
6. #3-Dale Earnhardt
7. #59-Robert Pressley
8. #44-Bobby Labonte
9. #84-Bill Elliott
10. #34-Todd Bodine

=== Winston Classic ===
The Winston Classic was held October 27 at Martinsville Speedway. Bobby Labonte won the pole.

Top ten results

1. #7-Harry Gant
2. #63-Chuck Bown
3. #32-Dale Jarrett
4. #34-Todd Bodine
5. #44-Bobby Labonte
6. #27-Ward Burton
7. #99-Jeff Burton
8. #1-Jeff Gordon
9. #79-Dave Rezendes
10. #25-Jimmy Hensley

== Full Drivers' Championship ==
(key) Bold – Pole position awarded by time. Italics – Pole position set by owner's points. * – Most laps led.

Pos	Driver	DAY	RCH	CAR	MAR	VOL	HCY	DAR	BRI	LAN	SBO	NAZ	CLT	DOV	ROU	HCY	MYB	GLN	OXF	NHA	SBO	DUB	IRP	ROU	BRI	DAR	RCH	DOV	CLT	NHA	CAR	MAR	Pts
1	Bobby Labonte	36	7	6*	4	7	7	2	1	12	6	7	8	5	6	3	21	16	7	37	11	25	1	9	2	5	**16**	13	19	4	8	**5**	4264
2	Kenny Wallace	10	3	2	3	1*	20	13	9	19	15	3	26	18	4	12	4	14	8	1*	2*	2	24	**7***	6	27	15	16	7	26	3	21	4190
3	Robert Pressley	20	28	9	25	14	6	25	30	**4***	20	10	12	15	1*	6*	2	13	40	7	22	3	13	2	7	19	2	2	18	5	7	29	3929
4	Chuck Bown	33	12	36	7	**10**	17	11	10	5	12	1*	25	19	25	**11**	**1***	7	12	2	16	1*	4*	5	**8**	17	29	17	23	2	42	2	3922
5	Jimmy Hensley	39	8*	10	1	4	**2***	**6**	23	16	21	**9**	4	7	2	1*	11	21	13	**32**	9	7	17	1	5	31	14	25	3	37	38	10	3916
6	Joe Nemechek	21	9	14	16	19	3	7	12	18	2	18	24	10	24	10	5	2	10	6	17	8	6	6	16	37	8	6	16	28	4	31	3902
7	Todd Bodine	27	15	4	12	8	8	5	26	8	10	22	39	1	22	18	6	5	3	22	**6**	**18**	12	21	22	3	33	26	8	18	10	4	3825
8	Tommy Houston	16	13	12	8	2	16	36	21	6	11	8	7	30	7	23	19	11	2	13	3	5	5	16	14	26	19	10	21	17	25	27	3777
9	Tom Peck	6	27	11	13	30	10	10	20	13	8	15	14	9	8	7	7	23	16	11	4	9	21	23	28	8	11	9	5	34	27	14	3746
10	Steve Grissom	25	21	33	6	9	18	37	28	26	**5**	2	20	8	12	5	3	9	9	3	1	6	19	4	24	16	25	23	29	25	16	20	3689
11	Jeff Gordon **(R)**	DNQ	17	24	14	13	15	9	32	2	23	5	18	2	**9**	2	13	6	29	15	20	12	18	11	3	28	13	8	35	19	37	8	3582
12	Jeff Burton	24	**31**	8	27	17	29	8	**13**	7	1*	29	27	11	5	25	15	4	6	20	21	15	30	24	9	15	30	14	14	7	34	7	3533
13	David Green **(R)**	**30**	DNQ	13	30	5	DNQ	23	2	1*	17	4	37	14	3	14	9	10	17	8	12	4	23	12	13	30	26	11	27	29	22	25	3389
14	Bobby Dotter	18	23	19	20	15	9	15	15	25	4	20	21	22	18	9	16	12	5	29	24	17	11	19	29	18	28	24	36	14	30	17	3327
15	Tracy Leslie **(R)**	35		15	22	16	14	16	8	22	19	14	17	12	20	8	29	17	4	27	19	19	2	10	21	13	12	28	22	33	13	24	3326
16	Butch Miller	12	29	30	29	3	1	20	16	23	18	16	11	26	19	29	17		22	DNQ	10	10	15	3	10	21	22	**12**	DNQ	6	12	11	3255
17	Dave Rezendes	17	25	23	15	18	21	32	14	15	9	17	22	27	14	26	20	27	18	18	15	14	20	20	20	9	17	37	33	46	11	9	3172
18	Ward Burton	DNQ	34	26	9	24	DNQ	33	29	10	29	12	9	4	13	15	8	22	14	34	18	26	**26**	17	15	36	9	3	**12***	22	24	6	3145
19	Ed Berrier	23	32	7	19	26	13	19	5	20	3	21	13	24	21	4	10	24	36	16	13	DNQ	8	28	18	33	24	27	34		21	23	3067
20	Elton Sawyer	15	26	25	**5**	12	12	29	27	11	7	11	38	23	23	24	26				7	DNQ	14	27	12	23	34	21	DNQ			30	2481
21	Harry Gant	5	1	5	24*			40	7				3	16											30	**7**	1	1*	1	3	5	1*	2309
22	Troy Beebe	DNQ	24		11	28	22	18	DNQ	17	26	25		25	30	16	12		20		26	28	10	13	DNQ	25	31	34	DNQ	15	20	16	2274
23	Dale Jarrett	31	4	1	2		19	1	24				DNQ	31						38			7		1*	14	3	31	28		2	3	2172
24	Cecil Eunice **(R)**	DNQ	18	17	10	21	DNQ	17	DNQ		27		16	17	17	13	14				25	11	34	29	DNQ	22	20	22	15		23		2097
25	Richard Lasater **(R)**	22		32		31	11	21	19		22		33	21		21	24				14	20	27	14	23	20	27	19	25		32		1989
26	Ed Ferree	DNQ	19	21		23	5	26	18	28	24	34	31	32	10	19	23	18	41	31	28		28									18	1837
27	Dale Earnhardt	1*	2	**3**				3	3				1*							35			33		11	1*	7*		39		6*		1799
28	Ernie Irvan	41		37			27	27	22*				23	13*				3		5					31	11	10		24	36	**1**		1551
29	Jeff Green **(R)**	DNQ		18	21	6	23	12	17	21		32			31	22	30					27	22	15	DNQ				DNQ				1396
30	Darrell Waltrip	32	11	35				24					6	3									29			6	6		6		15		1305
31	Davey Allison	3	10	34				DNQ	11			30	36	6						30					4	34	21		37	44	35		1303
32	Morgan Shepherd	7	6	29				35	31			35	30	28				26		39			32		27	35	5		41		36		1298
33	Tommy Ellis	13	30	16	23	29	DNQ	31												43							18	7	4	13	40	26	1253
34	Michael Waltrip	2	5					28*	25				32							4					17	2	4		26				1246
35	Ken Schrader	4				25	4					31	28												DNQ	10		5	2		14		1180
36	Jack Ingram	29	35	40	28		DNQ		DNQ	14	16		40		29	28					5	22	9	Wth					DNQ				1080
37	Dick Trickle	42											2										3		19	4	23	4	DNQ		28	28	1050
38	Mike Oliver **(R)**						24				14				16	27	27			DNQ	27	13	DNQ	25									1000
39	Mike Wallace **(R)**						DNQ			3	13	6	29	33			DNQ	28											20		41	19	907
40	Ricky Craven		14		26							19							1*	40										**1***		32	782
41	Jim Bown						30			27	30				27	20					23								17		17	DNQ	743
42	Jimmy Spencer	8					QL	30	4				QL												24				11	39			636
43	Jack Sprague	28						39					**5**													12		20	38		31		629
44	Joe Bessey	14		31								26							34	36				30				32		24			623
45	Mike McLaughlin **(R)**	37											41	34				19	39	14									28	12			620
46	Phil Parsons	DNQ						4					42					15								29			9		29		605
47	Jamie Aube		20									36							26	28								18		8			573
48	Terry Labonte	QL											10	20				**1***										30	31				560
49	Jay Fogleman														11						8			8								13	538
50	Patty Moise	DNQ	DNQ	22											28			20						22				15					494
51	Davey Johnson	38	16	27	31	20	DNQ	34	DNQ																								480
52	Rich Burgess **(R)**	DNQ		20		22		38				33												DNQ							18		422
53	Jeff Barry											23							28	25								33		27			407
54	Shawna Robinson **(R)**						DNQ								15							21		18					30			DNQ	400
55	Lonnie Rush Jr.					11				24													16								33		400
56	Ken Bouchard	43										24							24	33										23			374
57	Dave Mader III									9			19	**29**						41									DNQ				360
58	Tony Hirschman		Wth									28							11	44										16			355
59	Curtis Markham				17												22	8															351
60	Donnie Ling Jr.				18							13								DNQ												15	351
61	Clifford Allison	DNQ		28				14	6																								350
62	Mike Rowe																		15	23										11			342
63	Barney McRae		22																32	26								29					325
64	Dick McCabe																		38	9										10			321
65	Jeff Purvis																								32	32		35	17				304
66	Stub Fadden																		21	10										32			301
67	Kelly Moore																		37	19										9			296
68	Joey Kourafas																		19	12										38			282
69	Dale Shaw		33																31	17										43			280
70	Bill Elliott																												10		9		272
71	Kenny Gragg						26									17	32																264
72	Bobby Hillin Jr.	11		39									34																				237
73	Hal Goodson																18					16		DNQ									224
74	Robert Powell												15				28												DNQ				197
75	Billy Standridge																									24					19		197
76	Robert Huffman						DNQ						35													38			DNQ		26		192
77	Bob Brunell																			24										21			191
78	Bobby Gada																		27	21													182
79	Billy Clark																		**23**	42										42			182
80	Eddie Goodson																31							26									155
81	Dave Dion																		25											35			146
82	Mike Swaim							22																							39		143
83	Frank Bumgarner											37					25								DNQ								140
84	Randy MacDonald	9																															138
85	Dean Ferri																		33	DNQ										30			137
86	Peter Daniels																		35											31			128
87	Joe Thurman	40			32																												110
88	Hut Stricklin																						31						42				107
89	L. D. Ottinger	19																															106
90	Jeff Spraker			38																								36					104
91	Ron Lamell																													20			103
92	John Linville																						DNQ									22	97
93	Mike Porter	DNQ					DNQ															23											94
94	Jim Brinkley Jr.																					24		DNQ									91
95	Doug Didero						25																						DNQ			DNQ	88
96	Bobby Hamilton																						25										88
97	Doug Taylor																	25															88
98	Brad Teague	26							QL																				DNQ				85
99	Frank Fleming														26																		85
100	Pat Jones					27			DNQ																								82
101	Larry Brolsma											27																					82
102	Mark Martin						28																										79
103	Gary Neice						DNQ				28																						79
104	Jason Keller									29																							76
105	Steve Katz																	29															76
106	Randy Porter									30																							73
107	Mike Weeden																		30														73
108	Peter Sospenzo																			DNQ		DNQ		DNQ			32		DNQ				67
109	Tim Bender	34																															61
110	Dennis Setzer																												40				43
111	Jamie Tomaino																													41			40
112	Glenn Sullivan																			DNQ										45			28
113	Bobby Moon										25																						
114	Steve Park	DNQ																															
115	Don Jenkins	DNQ																															
116	Gary Balough	DNQ																											DNQ				
117	Karen Schulz						DNQ																										
118	Wesley Mills																DNQ																
119	Pete Silva																		DNQ														
120	Mike Stefanik																		DNQ														
121	Jim Field																		DNQ														
122	Tony Sylvester																		DNQ														
123	Bobby Dragon																		DNQ														
124	Mike Maselli																			DNQ													
125	Wayne Helliwell																			DNQ													
126	Mike Garvey																												DNQ				
127	Scott Herberg																												DNQ				
128	Jeff McClure																												DNQ				
129	Tony Siscone																															DNQ	
Pos	Driver	DAY	RCH	CAR	MAR	VOL	HCY	DAR	BRI	LAN	SBO	NAZ	CLT	DOV	ROU	HCY	MYB	GLN	OXF	NHA	SBO	DUB	IRP	ROU	BRI	DAR	RCH	DOV	CLT	NHA	CAR	MAR	Pts

== Rookie of the Year ==
20-year-old Jeff Gordon, driving for the newly formed Bill Davis Racing, won Rookie of the Year honors in 1991, starting 30 of 31 races and finishing in the top-five five times. The top runner-up was David Green, who was released from his FILMAR Racing ride at season's end. Tracy Leslie, Troy Beebe, Cecil Eunice and Richard Lasater were the only other drivers to attempt a full schedule.

== See also ==
- 1991 NASCAR Winston Cup Series
- 1991 NASCAR Winston West Series
