= Clifford Allison =

American racing driver

- Born: October 20, 1964; Hueytown, Alabama, U.S.
- Died: August 13, 1992 (aged 27); Michigan International Speedway; Brooklyn, Michigan, U.S.
- Cause of death: Racing accident

NASCAR O'Reilly Auto Parts Series career
- 22 races run over 3 years
- Best finish: 27th (1992)
- First race: 1990 Goody's 300 (Daytona)
- Last race: 1992 Fram Filter 500K (Talladega)
Wins	Top tens	Poles
0	2	0
- Statistics up to date as of January 28, 2012.

Robert Clifford Allison (October 20, 1964 – August 13, 1992) was an American stock car racing driver. Son of NASCAR champion Bobby Allison, he was a member of the "Alabama Gang". He was killed in a crash during practice for a NASCAR Busch Series race at Michigan International Speedway in 1992.

== Life and career ==
Son of the legendary Bobby Allison, nephew of Donnie and brother to Davey, Clifford Allison was raised in Hueytown, Alabama and was a member of stock car racing's "Alabama Gang".

Allison was seen as "crazy wild" by his relatives, and his brother stated he believed Clifford had the greater talent of the two younger Allisons. After marrying young, he worked in a coal mine in Kentucky for a period in the 1980s, but soon returned to Alabama and shortly after was divorced. He was then briefly crew chief for his father's Busch Series race team before the team was disbanded in 1988. By that time he remarried, Allison had started his racing career in earnest in the early 1990s, competing in ARCA and NASCAR Busch Series events; he began the 1990 season competing for rookie of the year in the Busch Series, driving for Frank Cicci, but was released after the season's seventh race for poor performances. Allison drove for Clint Folsom on a limited basis in 1991, while in 1992, he joined team owner Barry Owen, intending to run the majority of the series schedule.

Allison's best finish in professional stock car racing came in an ARCA race at Texas World Speedway in April 1992, where he finished second.

== Death ==
During practice for the Detroit Gasket 200, a Busch Series race at Michigan International Speedway in August 1992, Allison spun in turn four, hitting the concrete wall with the driver's side; he died shortly thereafter while in transit to hospital. He was the first of two Allisons to die within the space of eleven months; his brother perished in a helicopter crash at Talladega Superspeedway the following year.

Bobby Labonte and Richard Lasater were the first to reach the accident scene. It was reported that the driver's seat was "ripped from its moorings" in the accident and Allison was unrestrained in the crash.

NASCAR officials disputed that there was significant equipment failure. "The integrity of the car's safety features were there," NASCAR vice president Les Richter said. "The seat had moved a bit, but it was not flopping around. The car hit the wall almost absolutely flush, and that's one of the worst kinds of accidents."

On August 23, The Atlanta Constitution reported that according to "a driver who tried to assist Allison after the crash and a crew chief in the Grand National Series who requested anonymity, the cause of the fatal head injury was a broken seat, which prevented the safety harness from working properly and allowed Allison to be pitched into the car's roll cage."

In January 1996, Allison's estate filed a lawsuit against NASCAR, Michigan International Speedway, car-owner Barry Owen, helmet and harness manufacturer Simpson Performance Products, and seat builder Brian Butler. It was alleged that the faulty equipment and poor inspections turned a crash that should have been survivable into a fatal injury. A judge excused NASCAR, Penske Speedways (Michigan track ownership), and Owen from the lawsuit but Simpson and Butler failed to respond to the lawsuit and were held financially responsible for Allison's death.

Allison had three children at the time of his death, Brandon, Tanya, and Leslie. Widow Elisa is currently an author.

== Motorsports career results ==
=== NASCAR ===
(key) (Bold – Pole position awarded by qualifying time. Italics – Pole position earned by points standings or practice time. * – Most laps led.)

==== Busch Series ====
NASCAR Busch Series results
Year	Team	No.	Make	1	2	3	4	5	6	7	8	9	10	11	12	13	14	15	16	17	18	19	20	21	22	23	24	25	26	27	28	29	30	31	NBSC	Pts	Ref
1990	Frank Cicci Racing	34	Buick	DAY; 13	RCH; DNQ	CAR; 29	MAR; 25	HCY; DNQ	DAR; 17	BRI; 25	LAN	SBO	NZH	HCY	CLT	DOV	ROU	VOL	MYB	OXF	NHA	SBO	DUB	IRP	ROU	BRI	DAR	RCH	DOV	MAR	CLT	NHA	CAR	MAR	53rd	488	
1991	Folsom Racing	23	Buick	DAY; DNQ	RCH	CAR; 28	MAR	VOL	HCY	DAR; 14	BRI; 6	LAN	SBO	NZH	CLT	DOV	ROU	HCY	MYB	GLN	OXF	NHA	SBO	DUB	IRP	ROU	BRI	DAR	RCH	DOV	CLT	NHA	CAR	MAR	61st	350	
1992	Owen Racing	91	Olds	DAY; 29			ATL; 40														NHA; 37														27th	1372	
1992	Owen Racing	9	Olds		CAR; 17	RCH; 16		MAR; 17	DAR; 24	BRI; 15	HCY	LAN; 24	DUB	NZH; 13	CLT; 26	DOV; 9	ROU	MYB	GLN; 20	VOL															27th	1372	
1992	Owen Racing	9	Chevy																			TAL; 17	IRP	ROU	MCH; Wth	NHA	BRI	DAR	RCH	DOV	CLT	MAR	CAR	HCY	27th	1372	
