= Patty Moise =

American stock car racing driver

- Born: December 29, 1960 (age 65); Jacksonville, Florida, U.S.

NASCAR Cup Series career
- 5 races run over 3 years
- Best finish: 59th (1988)
- First race: 1987 The Budweiser at the Glen (Watkins Glen)
- Last race: 1989 Talladega DieHard 500 (Talladega)
Wins	Top tens	Poles
0	0	0

NASCAR O'Reilly Auto Parts Series career
- 133 races run over 12 years
- Best finish: 22nd (1990)
- First race: 1986 Food Giant 300 (Road Atlanta)
- Last race: 1998 Stihl 300 (Atlanta)
Wins	Top tens	Poles
0	4	0
- Statistics up to date as of February 29, 2012.

Patricia Moise-Sawyer (/moʊʔˈiːs/) is a former NASCAR driver. She drove in five Winston Cup races from 1987 to 1989, and 133 Busch Series races from 1986 to 1998. She is the wife of former fellow NASCAR driver Elton Sawyer.

== Racing career ==
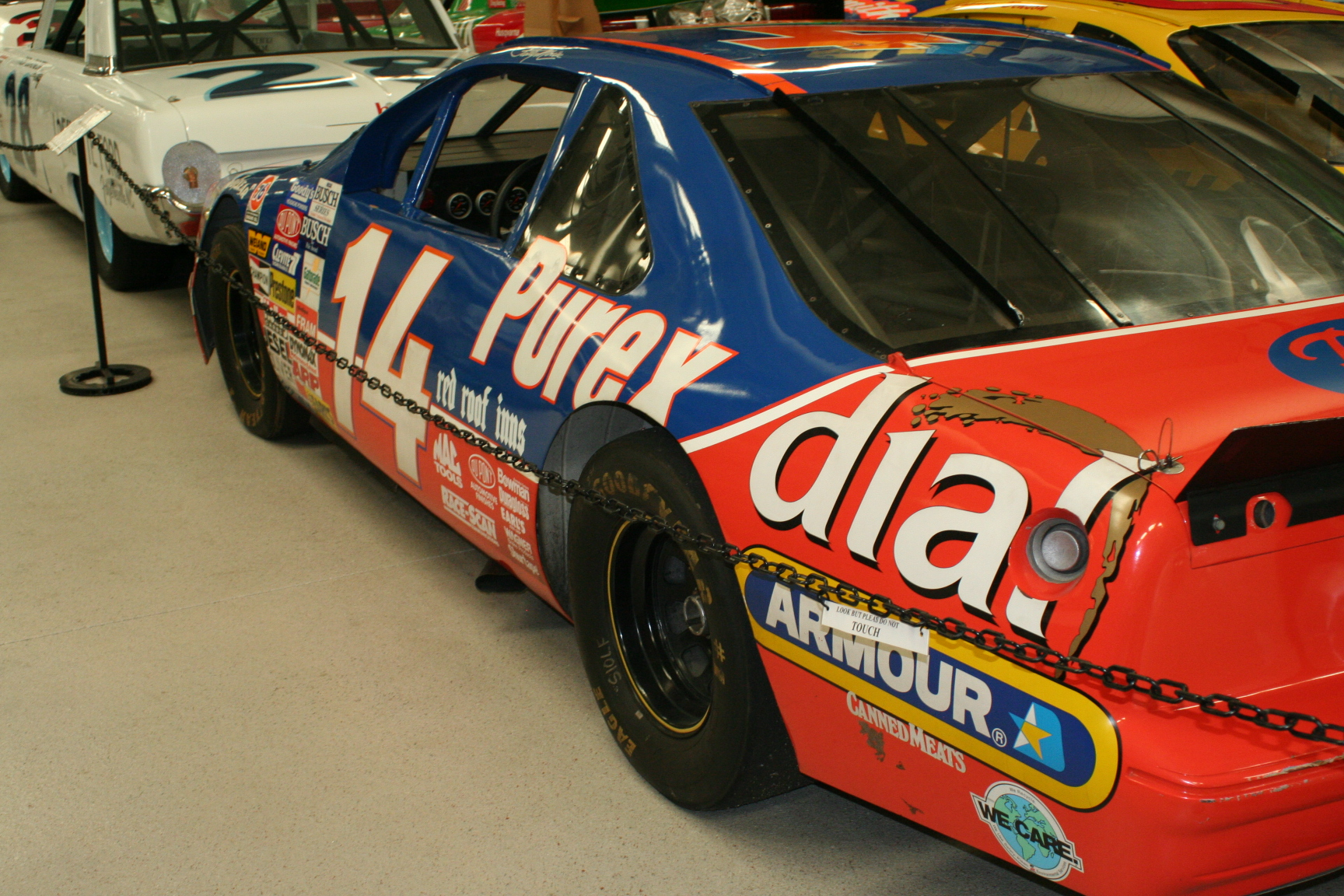
Moise's 1996 Busch Series car

Moise began racing at the age of sixteen, when she drove road course races in the IMSA series. She made her Busch Series debut in 1986 at Road Atlanta, driving the No. 47 Buick Regal for Randy Hope. She qualified third and finished 30th due to engine problems on the first lap. She ran another Busch race that season at North Carolina Speedway, finishing 34th. She also became the first woman to lead a Busch Series event.

In 1987, she fielded her own team, the No. 37 Buick. She posted two top-tens in twelve starts, but also had six DNF's, finishing 31st in points. She also made her Cup debut at Watkins Glen in the No. 89 Chevrolet owned by Marc Reno and Ernie Irvan. She finished 33rd after a crash.

The next season, she dropped to 34th in points and did not finish in the top-ten in eleven starts. She also ran two Cup races for Hope that year, the Pepsi 400 and at Watkins Glen, with her best finish being a 26th. In 1989, she switched to the No. 45 Buick. She posted two sixteenth-place runs and finished 35th in points. She also made her final two Cup starts, at Daytona and Talladega in her own car. Her best finish was 33rd.

In 1990, she sold her team to Mike Laughlin and made the most starts of her career, 24. Despite not finishing in the top-ten, she finished a career-high 22nd in points at season's end. During the season, she married her husband Elton, whom she joined as a teammate part-time the following season at Dilliard Racing, where her best finish was a fifteenth at Dover. She only made one race the next season, finishing fourteenth in her own No. 42 at Watkins Glen. In 1994, she ran six races for Doug Taylor, who signed her to drive the next season. She had a seventh-place run at Talladega in the No. 40 Ford and finished 25th in points. Unfortunately, she was released, and Sawyer started a team for her, the No. 14. Moise ran 18 races and finished 37th in points. She ran one race the next year in the car at Dover, but wrecked early in the race.

In 1998, her team was purchased by Michael Waltrip Racing, and she signed to drive the car. Despite a top-ten at Bristol, she had trouble making races and finished 37th in points. She has not raced in NASCAR since.

== Motorsports career results ==
=== NASCAR ===
(key) (Bold – Pole position awarded by qualifying time. Italics – Pole position earned by points standings or practice time. * – Most laps led.)

==== Winston Cup Series ====
NASCAR Winston Cup Series results
Year	Team	No.	Make	1	2	3	4	5	6	7	8	9	10	11	12	13	14	15	16	17	18	19	20	21	22	23	24	25	26	27	28	29	NWCC	Pts	Ref
1987	Reno Enterprises	89	Chevy	DAY	CAR	RCH	ATL	DAR	NWS	BRI	MAR	TAL	CLT	DOV	POC	RSD	MCH	DAY	POC	TAL	GLN; 33	MCH	BRI	DAR	RCH	DOV	MAR	NWS	CLT	CAR	RSD	ATL	96th	64	
1988	Hope Motorsports	37	Buick	DAY	RCH	CAR	ATL	DAR	BRI	NWS	MAR	TAL	CLT	DOV	RSD	POC	MCH	DAY; 26	POC	TAL	GLN; 30	MCH	BRI	DAR	RCH	DOV	MAR	CLT	NWS	CAR	PHO	ATL	59th	158	
1989	Moise Racing	45	Buick	DAY	CAR	ATL	RCH	DAR	BRI	NWS	MAR	TAL	CLT	DOV	SON	POC	MCH	DAY; 39	POC	TAL; 33	GLN	MCH; DNQ	BRI	DAR	RCH	DOV	MAR	CLT	NWS	CAR	PHO	ATL; DNQ	69th	110	

==== Busch Series ====
NASCAR Busch Series results
Year	Team	No.	Make	1	2	3	4	5	6	7	8	9	10	11	12	13	14	15	16	17	18	19	20	21	22	23	24	25	26	27	28	29	30	31	NBSC	Pts	Ref
1986	Hope Motorsports	47	Buick	DAY	CAR	HCY	MAR	BRI	DAR	SBO	LGY	JFC	DOV	CLT	SBO	HCY	ROU	IRP	SBO	RAL; 30	OXF	SBO	HCY	LGY	ROU	BRI	DAR	RCH	DOV	MAR	ROU	CLT			90th	73	
1986	Hope Motorsports	38	Buick																														CAR; 34	MAR	90th	73	
1987	Moise Racing	37	Buick	DAY	HCY	MAR	DAR	BRI; 16	LGY	SBO	CLT; 22	DOV	IRP	ROU	JFC; 26	OXF	SBO	HCY	RAL; 8	LGY	ROU	BRI; 18	JFC	DAR; 37	RCH; 17	DOV; 32	MAR; 10	CLT; 13	CAR; 11	MAR; 30					31st	1240	
1988	Moise Racing	37	Buick	DAY; 23	HCY	CAR; 24	MAR	DAR; 18	BRI; 19	LNG	NZH	SBO	NSV	CLT; 31	DOV	ROU	LAN	LVL	MYB	OXF	SBO	HCY	LNG	IRP	ROU	BRI	DAR; 27	RCH; 15	DOV; 26	MAR	CLT; 19	CAR; 33	MAR; 19		34th	1001	
1989	Moise Racing	45	Buick	DAY; 38	CAR; 26	MAR	HCY	DAR; 22	BRI; 25	NZH	SBO	LAN	NSV	CLT; 35	DOV; 18	ROU	LVL	VOL	MYB	SBO	HCY	DUB	IRP	ROU	BRI; 29	DAR; 30	RCH	DOV; 16	MAR	CLT; 26	CAR; 16	MAR; 30			35th	1023	
1990	Laughlin Racing	45	Buick	DAY; DNQ	RCH; 31	CAR; 40	MAR	HCY	DAR; 23	BRI; 28	LAN; 19	SBO	NZH; 33	HCY; 30	CLT; 13	DOV; 23	ROU; 20	VOL; 19	MYB; 14	OXF; DNQ	NHA; DNQ	SBO; 26	DUB; 29	IRP; 24	ROU; 20	BRI; 25	DAR; 23	RCH; 23	DOV	MAR; 12	CLT; 26	NHA; 20	CAR; 30	MAR; 23	22nd	2190	
1991	A.G. Dillard Motorsports	42	Buick	DAY; DNQ	RCH	CAR; 22	MAR	VOL	HCY	DAR	BRI	LAN	SBO	NZH	CLT	DOV	ROU; 28	HCY	MYB	GLN; 20	OXF	NHA	SBO	DUB	IRP	ROU; 22	BRI	DAR	RCH	DOV; 15	CLT	NHA	CAR	MAR	50th	494	
1992	Moise Racing	42	Buick	DAY	CAR	RCH	ATL	MAR	DAR	BRI	HCY	LAN	DUB	NZH	CLT	DOV	ROU	MYB	GLN; 14	VOL	NHA	TAL	IRP	ROU	MCH	NHA	BRI	DAR	RCH	DOV	CLT	MAR	CAR	HCY	94th	121	
1994	Taylor Motorsports	40	Ford	DAY; DNQ	CAR	RCH	ATL	MAR	DAR	HCY	BRI	ROU	NHA	NZH	CLT; DNQ	DOV; 19	MYB							MCH; 12				DOV; 42	CLT; DNQ	MAR	CAR				52nd	552	
1994	Taylor Motorsports	40	Chevy															GLN; 20	MLW	SBO							RCH; 25								52nd	552	
1994	Taylor Motorsports	40	Pontiac																		TAL; DNQ	HCY	IRP		BRI; 24	DAR									52nd	552	
1995	Taylor Motorsports	40	Ford	DAY; 42	CAR; 14	RCH; 23	ATL; 24	NSV; 28	DAR; 30	BRI; 22	HCY; DNQ	NHA; DNQ	NZH; 24	CLT; 18	DOV; 42	MYB; 22	GLN; 38	MLW; 37	TAL; 7	SBO; 27	IRP; 22	MCH; 27	BRI; 31	DAR; 13	RCH; DNQ	DOV; 24	CLT; DNQ	CAR; 23	HOM; DNQ						25th	1901	
1995	Douglas Motorsports	70	Pontiac								HCY; 25																								25th	1901	
1996	MS Racing	14	Ford	DAY; DNQ	CAR; 35	RCH; 21	ATL	NSV	DAR; 38	BRI; 25	HCY	NZH; 32	CLT; 32	DOV; 22	SBO	MYB; 24	GLN; 17	MLW; 36	NHA; 36	TAL; 18	IRP; 29	MCH; 30	BRI; 20	DAR; 33	RCH; DNQ	DOV; 16	CLT; DNQ	CAR; 28	HOM; DNQ						31st	1458	
1997	MS Racing	14	Chevy	DAY	CAR	RCH	ATL	LVS	DAR	HCY	TEX	BRI	NSV	TAL	NHA	NZH	CLT	DOV; 39	SBO	GLN; DNQ	MLW	MYB	GTY	IRP	MCH	BRI	DAR	RCH	DOV	CLT	CAL	CAR	HOM		112th	46	
1998	Michael Waltrip Racing	14	Ford	DAY; DNQ	CAR; DNQ	LVS; 35	NSV; 37	DAR; DNQ	BRI; 10	TEX; 39	HCY; DNQ	TAL; DNQ	NHA; 39	NZH; 19	CLT; 17	DOV; 32	RCH; DNQ	PPR; 12	GLN; DNQ	MLW; 30	MYB; DNQ	CAL; 32	SBO; DNQ	IRP; 23	MCH; 42		DAR; 36	RCH	DOV; 33	CLT; DNQ	GTY; 25	CAR; 39	ATL; 23	HOM; DNQ	37th	1421	
1998	Michael Waltrip Racing	14	Chevy																							BRI; 36									37th	1421	

=== ARCA Permatex SuperCar Series ===
(key) (Bold – Pole position awarded by qualifying time. Italics – Pole position earned by points standings or practice time. * – Most laps led.)

ARCA Permatex SuperCar Series results
Year	Team	No.	Make	1	2	3	4	5	6	7	8	9	10	11	12	13	14	15	16	17	18	19	APSC	Pts	Ref
1988	Moise Racing	37	Buick	DAY	ATL	**TAL**; 41	FRS	PCS	ROC	POC	WIN	KIL	ACS	SLM	POC	**TAL**; 33	DEL	FRS	ISF	DSF	SLM	ATL	75th	-	
1989	Moise Racing	45	Buick	**DAY**; 19*	ATL	KIL	TAL; DNQ	FRS	POC	KIL	HAG	POC	TAL; 15	DEL	FRS	ISF	TOL	DSF	SLM	ATL			75th	-	
1990	Laughlin Racing	45	Buick	**DAY**; 6	ATL	KIL	TAL	FRS	POC	KIL	TOL	HAG	POC	TAL	MCH	ISF	TOL	DSF	WIN	DEL	ATL		104th	-	
