= Ricky Miller (racing driver) =

American racing driver

- Nationality: (United States) American
- Born: Oliver W. Miller III; March 21, 1970 Claremont, New Hampshire, U.S.
- Died: October 22, 2004 (aged 34) Springfield, Massachusetts, U.S.

NASCAR Featherlite Modified Tour
- Years active: 1993–1994, 1999–2001
- Starts: 27
- Wins: 1
- Poles: 0
- Best finish: 19th in 2001

Oliver W. Miller III (born March 21, 1970 – October 22, 2004) was an American professional stock car racing driver who competed in the NASCAR Winston Modified Tour from 1993 to 2001. He is best known for winning the final Modified Tour race at Riverside Park Speedway in 1999 before the tracks closure.

Miller died at the age of 34 on October 22, 2004, as a result of being involved in a racing accident the previous day.

Miller also competed in what is now the ARCA Menards Series East.

== Motorsports results ==
=== NASCAR ===
(key) (Bold – Pole position awarded by qualifying time. Italics – Pole position earned by points standings or practice time. * – Most laps led.)

==== Busch Series ====
NASCAR Busch Series results
Year	Team	No.	Make	1	2	3	4	5	6	7	8	9	10	11	12	13	14	15	16	17	18	19	20	21	22	23	24	25	26	27	28	29	30	31	NBSC	Pts	Ref
1990	Donald Miller	06	Pontiac	DAY	RCH	CAR	MAR	HCY	DAR	BRI	LAN	SBO	NZH	HCY	CLT	DOV	ROU	VOL	MYB	OXF	NHA; DNQ	SBO	DUB	IRP	ROU	BRI	DAR	RCH	DOV	MAR	CLT	NHA	CAR	MAR	N/A	0	

==== Featherlite Modified Tour ====
NASCAR Featherlite Modified Tour results
Year	Team	No.	Make	1	2	3	4	5	6	7	8	9	10	11	12	13	14	15	16	17	18	19	20	21	NFMTC	Pts	Ref
1993	Emmarino Racing	9	Chevy	RCH	STA	TMP	NHA; 15	NZH	STA	RIV	NHA; 17	RPS	HOL	LEE	RIV	STA	TMP	TMP	STA						49th	118	
1993	Emmarino Racing	91	Chevy																	TMP; 24					49th	118	
1994	Mario Fiore	44	Pontiac	NHA	STA	TMP	NZH	STA	LEE	TMP	RIV	TIO	NHA	RPS	HOL	TMP	RIV	NHA	STA	SPE	TMP; 29	NHA	STA	TMP	N/A	0	
1999	N/A	12	Chevy	TMP	RPS; 25	STA	RCH	STA	RIV	JEN	NHA	NZH	HOL	TMP	NHA	RIV	GLN	STA	RPS; 1	TMP	NHA	STA; 15	MAR; DNQ	TMP	N/A	0	
2000	N/A	42	Chevy	STA	RCH	STA	RIV	SEE; 11	NHA	NZH	TMP	RIV	GLN	TMP	STA; 23	WFD; 9	NHA	STA; 35	MAR	TMP					46th	481	
2001	Mario Fiore	44	Chevy	SBO	TMP; 35	STA; 16	WFD; 11	NZH; 29	STA; 21	RIV; DNQ	SEE; DNQ	RCH; 20	NHA; 11	HOL; 14	RIV; DNQ	CHE; 21	TMP; 3	STA; 10	WFD; 20	TMP; 6	STA; 24	MAR; 32	TMP; 9		19th	1961	
