= Didero =

Didero is a surname. Notable people with the surname include:

- Doug Didero (born 1960), Canadian racing driver
- Maria Cristina Didero (fl. 1999), Italian curator, historian, author, and design scholar
