= Ed Berrier =

American racing driver (born 1961)

- Born: Max Edward Berrier III; November 8, 1961 (age 65); Winston-Salem, North Carolina, U.S.
- Awards: 1981 NASCAR Dash Series Rookie of the Year

NASCAR Cup Series career
- 19 races run over 7 years
- Best finish: 47th (2000)
- First race: 1995 Mountain Dew Southern 500 (Darlington)
- Last race: 2000 Pennsylvania 500 (Pocono)
Wins	Top tens	Poles
0	0	0

NASCAR O'Reilly Auto Parts Series career
- 250 races run over 17 years
- Best finish: 11th (1988)
- First race: 1984 Miller Time 250 (Martinsville)
- Last race: 2001 Mr. Goodcents 300 (Kansas)
- First win: 1998 Galaxy Food Centers 300 (Hickory)
Wins	Top tens	Poles
1	37	1

NASCAR FedEx Freight Truck Series career
- 1 race run over 1 year
- Best finish: 94th (2003)
- First race: 2003 Florida Dodge Dealers 250 (Daytona)
Wins	Top tens	Poles
0	0	0

Max Edward Berrier III (born November 8, 1961) is an American second-generation NASCAR driver. His father Max Berrier competed in seven Grand National races over four years and won 125 feature races as a modified driver. His distant relative Todd served as the crew chief for Jeff Burton in the Sprint Cup Series.

== Career ==
Berrier was born in Winston-Salem, North Carolina. He started running go-karts and became a force to be reckoned with, winning 72 out of 127 races. In 1980, he moved to the NASCAR Dash Series, driving for his own team. Four years later, he made his Busch Series debut, running eighteen races and finishing in top-ten three times. He would not finish that high again until 1987, when he had four top-fives. Berrier ran abbreviated schedules over the next few years (except 1988) and put together 22 top-tens. He made his Winston Cup debut in 1995 at the Mountain Dew Southern 500, finishing in twentieth position. Berrier's only NASCAR start in 1996 came at Darlington Raceway, where he finished 39th. After running a limited Cup schedule with Sadler Brothers Racing in 1997, Berrier was tapped by PRW Racing to drive the No. 77 UAW/Lear-sponsored Ford in the Busch Series. After putting together three top-twenty finishes in an abbreviated run, Berrier returned to the team in 1998, this time, with former Cup campaigner Jimmy Means as crew chief. The highlight of this year came at the final Galaxy Food Centers 300. Berrier dominated, starting on the outside pole, leading 187 laps, and garnering his only victory at a premier NASCAR series. Despite filing to qualify for the race at Rockingham Speedway, Berrier and company finished seventeenth in points that year. Unfortunately, Berrier's success did not carry over into 1999, and after qualifying for just seventeen races, Berrier was fired.

Berrier soon landed on his feet, by running a limited schedule for Junie Donlavey in late 1999. After his audition, Donlavey signed Berrier to drive for his team with a package sponsorship from Hills Brothers Coffee. Unfortunately, the sight of the team packing up and heading home after second round qualifying became too common, and Berrier was released once again. Berrier's Cup Series career resulted in nineteen races and 25 DNQs, with a best Cup finish of twentieth in a 1995 Darlington race. He ran the inaugural Busch Series race at Kansas Speedway but crashed on the tenth lap. Berrier's last NASCAR race came in the Craftsman Truck Series season opener in 2003, finishing thirteenth for Kevin Harvick Incorporated.

Following his racing career, Berrier worked as a crew chief in NASCAR competition. As of 2017, he is employed at JKS Motorsports Incorporated in Welcome, North Carolina, as the lead fabricator and sometimes stunt driver for motorsports-related commercial shoots and movies.

== Motorsports career results ==
=== NASCAR ===
(key) (Bold – Pole position awarded by qualifying time. Italics – Pole position earned by points standings or practice time. * – Most laps led.)

==== Winston Cup Series ====
NASCAR Winston Cup Series results
Year	Team	No.	Make	1	2	3	4	5	6	7	8	9	10	11	12	13	14	15	16	17	18	19	20	21	22	23	24	25	26	27	28	29	30	31	32	33	34	35	36	NWCC	Pts	Ref
1995	Active Motorsports	32	Chevy	DAY	CAR	RCH	ATL	DAR	BRI	NWS	MAR	TAL	SON	CLT	DOV	POC	MCH	DAY	NHA	POC	TAL	IND	GLN	MCH	BRI	DAR; 20	RCH; DNQ	DOV	MAR	NWS	CLT	CAR	PHO	ATL						57th	103	
1996	Schnell Motorsports	63	Ford	DAY	CAR	RCH	ATL	DAR	BRI	NWS	MAR	TAL	SON	CLT; DNQ	DOV	POC	MCH	DAY	NHA	POC	TAL	IND	GLN	MCH	BRI															66th	46	
1996	Berrier Racing	60	Ford																							DAR; 39	RCH	DOV	MAR	NWS	CLT	CAR; DNQ	PHO	ATL						66th	46	
1997	Sadler Brothers Racing	95	Chevy	DAY	CAR	RCH	ATL; DNQ	DAR	TEX; DNQ	BRI; 23	MAR	SON		CLT; DNQ	DOV; DNQ	POC	MCH; DNQ	CAL	DAY	NHA	POC	IND; 27	GLN	MCH	BRI; 28	DAR	RCH	NHA	DOV	MAR	CLT	TAL; DNQ	CAR; DNQ	PHO	ATL; DNQ					55th	255	
1997	Sadler Brothers Racing	95	Ford										TAL; DNQ																											55th	255	
1999	Donlavey Racing	90	Ford	DAY	CAR	LVS	ATL	DAR; 39	TEX	BRI	MAR	TAL	CAL	RCH	CLT	DOV	MCH	POC	SON	DAY	NHA	POC	IND	GLN	MCH	BRI	DAR	RCH	NHA	DOV; 31	MAR	CLT; DNQ	TAL; 33	CAR; DNQ	PHO	HOM; DNQ	ATL; 25			52nd	268	
2000	Donlavey Racing	90	Ford	DAY; 37	CAR; 36	LVS; DNQ	ATL; DNQ	DAR; DNQ	BRI; DNQ	TEX; 35	MAR; DNQ	TAL; 28	CAL; DNQ	RCH; DNQ	CLT; DNQ	DOV; 41	MCH; 33	POC; 28	SON	DAY; 26	NHA; 37	POC; 33	IND	GLN	MCH	BRI	DAR	RCH	NHA	DOV	MAR	CLT	TAL	CAR	PHO	HOM	ATL			47th	628	
2001	Sadler Brothers Racing	95	Ford	DAY	CAR	LVS	ATL	DAR	BRI	TEX	MAR	TAL	CAL	RCH	CLT	DOV	MCH	POC	SON	DAY	CHI	NHA	POC	IND; DNQ	GLN	MCH	BRI	DAR	RCH	DOV	KAN	CLT	MAR	TAL	PHO	CAR	HOM	ATL	NHA	NA	-	
2002	Donlavey Racing	90	Ford	DAY	CAR	LVS	ATL	DAR	BRI	TEX	MAR	TAL	CAL	RCH	CLT	DOV	POC	MCH	SON	DAY; DNQ	CHI	NHA	POC	IND	GLN	MCH	BRI	DAR	RCH	NHA	DOV	KAN	TAL	CLT	MAR	ATL	CAR	PHO	HOM	NA	-	

===== Daytona 500 =====
Year	Team	Manufacturer	Start	Finish
2000	Donlavey Racing	Ford	26	37

==== Busch Series ====
NASCAR Busch Series results
Year	Team	No.	Make	1	2	3	4	5	6	7	8	9	10	11	12	13	14	15	16	17	18	19	20	21	22	23	24	25	26	27	28	29	30	31	32	33	NBSC	Pts	Ref
1984	Berrier Racing	60	Olds	DAY	RCH	CAR	HCY	MAR; 12	DAR; 33	ROU; 17	NSV	LGY	MLW; 10	DOV	CLT; 13	SBO; 24	HCY; 13	ROU	SBO; 16	ROU; 18	HCY	IRP; 15	LGY; 19	SBO	BRI; 8	DAR; 14	RCH	NWS; 25	CLT; 32	HCY; 21	CAR; 29	MAR; 6					19th	1968	
1985	Berrier Racing	60	Pontiac	DAY; 27					DAR; 35	SBO			CLT; 35	SBO									DAR; 38	RCH			CLT; 20	HCY	CAR; 34	MAR							24th	1298	
1985	Berrier Racing	55	Pontiac		CAR; 16	HCY																															24th	1298	
1985	Berrier Racing	60	Olds				BRI; 13	MAR; 17			LGY; 25	DOV; 16																									24th	1298	
1985		53	Pontiac												HCY; 16	ROU	IRP	SBO	LGY	HCY	MLW	BRI; 21			NWS; 15	ROU											24th	1298	
1986	Berrier Racing	60	Pontiac	DAY; 19	CAR; 21				DAR; 25	SBO	LGY		DOV; 16	CLT; 25			ROU; 17												DOV; 11	MAR; 23							20th	2351	
1986	McDowell Racing	53	Pontiac			HCY; 14	MAR; 26	BRI																													20th	2351	
1986	Berrier Racing	60	Olds									JFC; 16			SBO; 26	HCY; 22		IRP; 22	SBO	RAL	OXF																20th	2351	
1986	Dwight Huffman Racing	07	Pontiac																			SBO; 22	HCY; 16	LGY; 17	ROU; 24	BRI; 29					ROU; 24	CLT					20th	2351	
1986	Dwight Huffman Racing	07	Olds																								DAR; 16										20th	2351	
1986		05	Pontiac																									RCH; 23									20th	2351	
1986	Berrier Racing	61	Pontiac																														CAR; 12	MAR			20th	2351	
1987	Berrier Racing	12	Pontiac	DAY; 12	HCY	MAR	DAR; 9				CLT; 7	DOV; 3														DOV; 11											16th	2928	
1987		09	Olds					BRI; 27																													16th	2928	
1987	Shugart Racing	90	Chevy						LGY; 12	SBO; 14			IRP; 30	ROU; 7		OXF; 36	SBO; 2	HCY; 5		LGY; 23	ROU; 4		JFC; 21														16th	2928	
1987	Linville Racing	43	Pontiac												JFC; 20																						16th	2928	
1987	Berrier Racing	03	Pontiac																RAL; 27																		16th	2928	
1987		53	Pontiac																			BRI; 14															16th	2928	
1987	Shugart Racing	90	Buick																					DAR; 15				CLT; 22	CAR; 16								16th	2928	
1987	Huffman Racing	77	Pontiac																						RCH; 24												16th	2928	
1987	Berrier Racing	12	Olds																								MAR; 11			MAR; 27							16th	2928	
1988	Shugart Racing	90	Buick	DAY; 38	HCY; 19	CAR; 28	MAR; 20	DAR; 38	BRI; 6	LNG; 12	NZH; 31		NSV; 5	CLT; 10	DOV; 4	ROU; 13	LAN; 13	LVL; 6	MYB; 26	OXF; 37	SBO; 7	HCY; 21	LNG; 10	IRP; 23	ROU; 4	BRI; 26	DAR; 30	RCH; 10	DOV; 27	MAR; 28	CLT; 16	CAR; 21	MAR; 26				11th	3204	
1988		72	Buick									SBO; 21																									11th	3204	
1989	Sam Ard Racing	5	Buick	DAY; 12	CAR																																37th	961	
1989	Linville Racing	62	Olds			MAR; 26	HCY; 25	DAR; 42		NZH; 31	SBO	LAN	NSV																								37th	961	
1989	Huffman Racing	70	Buick						BRI; 28																												37th	961	
1989	Hill Racing	4	Olds											CLT; 40	DOV; 12	ROU	LVL	VOL	MYB	SBO	HCY	DUB	IRP	ROU	BRI	DAR; 9	RCH	DOV	MAR	CLT; 42	CAR; 11	MAR					37th	961	
1990	Hill Racing	4	Buick	DAY; 34	RCH	CAR; 17	MAR	HCY	DAR; 10	BRI	LAN	SBO	NZH	HCY	CLT	DOV; DNQ																					28th	1748	
1990	Pharo Racing	33	Olds														ROU; 23	VOL	MYB	OXF	NHA; 14	SBO; 10	DUB	IRP; 8	**ROU**; 26	BRI; 32	DAR; 22	RCH; 17	DOV; 14	MAR; 16	CLT; 40	NHA; 10	CAR; 20	MAR; 30			28th	1748	
1991	Sam Ard Racing	5	Olds	DAY; 23	RCH; 32	CAR; 7	MAR; 19	VOL; 26	HCY; 13																												19th	3067	
1991	Pharo Racing	33	Olds							DAR; 19	BRI; 5	LAN; 20	SBO; 3	NZH; 21	CLT; 13	DOV; 24	ROU; 21	HCY; 4	MYB; 10	GLN; 24	OXF; 36	NHA; 16	SBO; 13	DUB; DNQ	IRP; 8	ROU; 28	BRI; 18	DAR; 33	RCH; 24	DOV; 27	CLT; 34	NHA	CAR; 21	MAR; 23			19th	3067	
1992	Three Star Motorsports	22	Olds	DAY; 17	CAR	RCH	ATL; 27	MAR	DAR; 21	BRI	HCY	LAN	DUB	NZH	CLT; 27	DOV	ROU	MYB	GLN	VOL	NHA	TAL; 14	IRP	ROU	MCH	NHA	BRI; 24	DAR; 5	RCH	DOV; 31	CLT; DNQ	MAR	CAR; 17	HCY			41st	925	
1993	Three Star Motorsports	12	Olds	DAY; 19																																	45th	647	
1993	Three Star Motorsports	22	Olds		CAR; 26	RCH	DAR; 36	BRI	HCY	ROU	MAR; 23	NZH	CLT	DOV	MYB	GLN	MLW	TAL; QL^{†}	IRP	MCH	NHA	BRI	DAR; 7	RCH	DOV	ROU											45th	647	
1993	Three Star Motorsports	22	Chevy																								CLT; DNQ	MAR	CAR; 26	HCY	ATL; 29						45th	647	
1994	Three Star Motorsports	22	Ford	DAY; DNQ	CAR	RCH	ATL	MAR	DAR	HCY	BRI	ROU	NHA	NZH	CLT	DOV	MYB	GLN	MLW	SBO	TAL	HCY															68th	261	
1994	Owen Racing	9	Chevy																				IRP; QL^{‡}	MCH	BRI												68th	261	
1994	Three Star Motorsports	22	Chevy																							DAR; 16	RCH	DOV	CLT; 33	MAR	CAR; 27						68th	261	
1995	Davison Motorsports	97	Chevy	DAY	CAR	RCH	ATL	NSV	DAR; 11	BRI; 35	HCY	NHA																									47th	596	
1995	American Equipment Racing	95	Chevy										NZH; 33	CLT				MLW; 38	TAL	SBO	IRP	MCH	BRI; 34	DAR	RCH	DOV	CLT										47th	596	
1995	Williams Racing	56	Ford												DOV; 34	MYB; 27	GLN																				47th	596	
1995	Group III Racing	18	Ford																									CAR; 24	HOM								47th	596	
1997	PRW Racing	77	Ford	DAY	CAR	RCH	ATL	LVS	DAR	HCY	TEX	BRI	NSV	TAL	NHA	NZH	CLT	DOV	SBO	GLN	MLW	MYB	GTY	IRP	MCH; 26	BRI		RCH; 18	DOV; 12	CLT; DNQ	CAL; 13	CAR; 41	HOM; 27				48th	655	
1997	PRW Racing	77	Chevy																								DAR; 25										48th	655	
1998	PRW Racing	77	Ford	DAY; 26	CAR; DNQ	LVS; 10	NSV; 36	DAR; 30	BRI; 43	TEX; 16	HCY; 1*	TAL; 34	NHA; 22	NZH; 6	CLT; 11	DOV; 24	RCH; 32	PPR; 17	GLN; 15	MLW; 37	MYB; 19	CAL; 41	SBO; 29	IRP; 13	MCH; 33	BRI; 24	DAR; 24	RCH; 32	DOV; 36	CLT; 26	GTY; 11	CAR; 29	ATL; 24	HOM; 17			17th	2772	
1999	PRW Racing	77	Ford	DAY; DNQ	CAR; 29	LVS; DNQ	ATL; 14	DAR; 15	TEX; DNQ	NSV; 23	BRI; 12	TAL; 22	CAL; 10	NHA; 10	RCH; 19	NZH; 29	CLT; DNQ	DOV; 37	SBO; DNQ	GLN	MLW; 19	MYB; 28	PPR; 16	GTY; 22	IRP; 20												31st	1705	
1999	PRW Racing	52	Ford																							MCH; 31	BRI										31st	1705	
1999	Davis & Weight Motorsports	55	Pontiac																									DAR; DNQ	RCH	DOV							31st	1705	
1999	Mark III Motorsports	78	Chevy																												CLT; DNQ						31st	1705	
1999	HVP Motorsports	63	Chevy																													CAR; DNQ	MEM	PHO	HOM		31st	1705	
2000	Sasser Motorsports	65	Chevy	DAY; DNQ	CAR	LVS	ATL	DAR	BRI	TEX	NSV	TAL	CAL	RCH	NHA	CLT	DOV	SBO	MYB	GLN	MLW	NZH	PPR	GTY	IRP	MCH	BRI	DAR	RCH	DOV	CLT						101st	76	
2000	PRW Racing	77	Ford																													CAR; 29	MEM	PHO	HOM		101st	76	
2001	Richard Childress Racing	2	Chevy	DAY	CAR	LVS	ATL	DAR	BRI	TEX	NSH	TAL	CAL	RCH	NHA	NZH	CLT	DOV	KEN	MLW	GLN	CHI	GTY	PPR; QL^{±}	IRP	MCH	BRI	DAR	RCH	DOV							150th	34	
2001	Cavin Councilor	19	Chevy																												KAN; 43	CLT	MEM	PHO	CAR	HOM	150th	34	
^{†} - Qualified but replaced by Jimmy Spencer . ^{‡} - Qualified for Mike Wallace . ^{±} - Qualified for Kevin Harvick

==== Craftsman Truck Series ====
NASCAR Craftsman Truck Series results
Year	Team	No.	Make	1	2	3	4	5	6	7	8	9	10	11	12	13	14	15	16	17	18	19	20	21	22	23	24	25	26	27	NCTC	Pts	Ref
1998	Jimmy Means Racing	92	Ford	WDW	HOM	PHO	POR	EVG	I70	GLN	TEX	BRI; DNQ	MLW	NZH	CAL	PPR	IRP	NHA	FLM	NSV	HPT	LVL	RCH	MEM	GTY	MAR	SON	MMR	PHO	LVS	118th	-	
2003	Kevin Harvick Incorporated	6	Chevy	DAY; 13	DAR	MMR	MAR	CLT	DOV	TEX	MEM	MLW	KAN	KEN	GTW	MCH	IRP	NSH	BRI	RCH	NHA	CAL	LVS	SBO	TEX	MAR	PHO	HOM			94th	124	

=== ARCA Re/Max Series ===
(key) (Bold – Pole position awarded by qualifying time. Italics – Pole position earned by points standings or practice time. * – Most laps led.)

ARCA Re/Max Series results
Year	Team	No.	Make	1	2	3	4	5	6	7	8	9	10	11	12	13	14	15	16	17	18	19	20	21	22	23	24	25	ARMC	Pts	Ref
1985		77	Pontiac	ATL; 12																									53rd	-	
1985	Berrier Racing	60	Pontiac		DAY; 35	ATL	TAL	ATL	SSP	IRP	CSP	FRS	IRP	OEF	ISF	DSF	TOL												53rd	-	
1995		4	Ford	DAY	ATL	TAL	FIF	KIL	FRS	MCH	I80	MCS	FRS	POC	POC; 4	KIL	FRS	SBS	LVL	ISF	DSF	SLM	WIN	ATL					105th	-	
1996		60	Ford	DAY	ATL	SLM	TAL	FIF	LVL	CLT	CLT	KIL	FRS	POC	MCH	FRS	TOL	POC; 3	MCH	INF	SBS	ISF	DSF	KIL	SLM	WIN	CLT	ATL	125th	-	
1997	Berrier Racing	90	Ford	DAY; 16	ATL; 29	SLM	CLT; 2		POC; 2	MCH; 11	SBS	TOL	KIL	FRS	MIN	POC; 31	MCH; 14	DSF				CLT; 4	TAL; 34	ISF	ATL; 5				13th	-	
1997	Berrier Racing	9	Ford					CLT; 6																					13th	-	
1997	Sadler Brothers Racing	90	Chevy																GTW; 5	SLM	WIN								13th	-	
1998	Donlavey Racing	90	Ford	DAY; 11	ATL; 9	SLM	CLT	MEM	MCH	POC	SBS	TOL	PPR	POC	KIL	FRS	ISF	ATL	DSF	SLM	TEX	WIN	CLT	TAL	ATL				NA	-	
2000	Cavin Councilor	19	Chevy	DAY	SLM	AND	CLT	KIL	FRS	MCH	POC	TOL	KEN	BLN	POC	WIN	ISF	KEN	DSF	SLM	CLT	TAL	ATL; 41						144th	30	
2001	Cavin Councilor	19	Chevy	DAY	NSH	WIN	SLM	GTY; 4	KEN; 32	CLT; 22	KAN; 4	MCH; 2	POC; 7	MEM	GLN	KEN; 23	MCH	POC	NSH; 3	ISF	CHI; 1	DSF	SLM	TOL	BLN	CLT	TAL		20th	2035	
2001	Cavin Councilor	91	Chevy																									ATL; 7	20th	2035	
