= Tom Peck =

American stock car racing driver

- Born: April 4, 1953 (age 73); McConnellsburg, Pennsylvania, U.S.

NASCAR O'Reilly Auto Parts Series career
- 171 races run over 9 years
- Best finish: 5th (1990)
- First race: 1984 Mello Yello 300 (Charlotte)
- Last race: 1995 All Pro Bumper To Bumper 300 (Charlotte)
Wins	Top tens	Poles
0	52	0

Thomas Peck (born April 4, 1953) is an American professional stock car racing driver. He is a former competitor in the NASCAR Busch Series. He is the uncle of current driver Todd Peck.

== Career ==
Born in McConnellsburg, Pennsylvania, Peck drove the No. 89 Pontiac in two races in 1984 in the Busch Grand National Series, but failed to finish either race. In 1988, he ran the No. 96 Thomas Chevy sponsored Olds in six races with a best finish of ninth at Dover.

The next year, Peck piloted the No. 96 again in 28 races and posted seven top-tens and was tenth in points. In 1990, he made 31 starts and had 12 top tens and finished a career best fifth in the points. The next year, he got one more top-ten but fell in the points to ninth. In 1992, he switched to the No. 19 Levin Racing Olds with seven top-tens.

After the third race of the 1993 season, Peck was third in the point standings with S-K Hand Tools and Delco Remy sponsoring the No. 19 car. A series of accidents mid-season ended any hopes he had of a top-five points finish. Peck would end the 1993 season with his second consecutive 13th-place points finish. In 1994, he got hired to drive No. 31 Channellock Chevy which Steve Grissom won the championship with the previous year. This was the dream ride Peck had been waiting for and set his sights on winning the 1994 Busch Series Championship. This opportunity only lasted a couple months as before the race at Rougemont Peck was released from his ride. The next year he made his final three career starts in the No. 18 Ford and No. 67 Chevy.

Peck's final appearance in the Busch Series was at Nazareth Speedway in 1996, where he qualified the No. 64 Chevrolet for Shoemaker Racing's regular driver, Dick Trickle, Trickle being at Charlotte Motor Speedway for the 1996 Winston Select. He qualified the car 29th, and was replaced by Trickle for the race; Peck has not competed in NASCAR competition since.

== Motorsports career results ==
=== NASCAR ===
(key) (Bold – Pole position awarded by qualifying time. Italics – Pole position earned by points standings or practice time. * – Most laps led.)

==== Busch Series ====
NASCAR Busch Series results
Year	Team	No.	Make	1	2	3	4	5	6	7	8	9	10	11	12	13	14	15	16	17	18	19	20	21	22	23	24	25	26	27	28	29	30	31	NBGNC	Pts	Ref
1984	Plessinger Racing	89	Pontiac	DAY	RCH	CAR	HCY	MAR	DAR	ROU	NSV	LGY	MLW	DOV	CLT; 27	SBO	HCY	ROU	SBO	ROU	HCY	IRP	LGY	SBO	BRI	DAR	RCH	NWS	CLT; 37	HCY	CAR	MAR			93rd	82	
1988	Mark Thomas Racing	96	Chevy	DAY; DNQ	HCY	CAR	MAR	DAR	BRI	LGY	NZH	SBO	NSV	CLT; 20	DOV; 9	ROU	LAN	LMS	MYB	OXF	SBO	HCY	LGY	IRP	ROU	BRI									38th	596	
1988	Mark Thomas Racing	96	Olds																								DAR; 24	RCH	DOV; 16	MAR	CLT; 30	CAR; 29	MAR		38th	596	
1989	Mark Thomas Racing	96	Olds	DAY; DNQ	CAR; 18	MAR; 16	HCY; 20	DAR; 35	BRI; 16		SBO; 15	LAN; 18	NSV; 14	CLT; 37	DOV; 14	ROU; 11	LMS; 8	VOL; 25	MYB; 10	SBO; 20	HCY; 18	DUB; 11	IRP; 9	ROU; 9	BRI; 16	DAR; 5	RCH; 29	DOV; 9	MAR; 15	CLT; 18	CAR; 28	MAR; 25			10th	3171	
1989	Mark Thomas Racing	86	Olds							NZH; 4																									10th	3171	
1990	Mark Thomas Racing	96	Olds	DAY; 18	RCH; 7	CAR; 18	MAR; 7	HCY; 16	DAR; 11	BRI; 7	LAN; 18	SBO; 18	NZH; 12	HCY; 17	CLT; 14	DOV; 4	ROU; 9	VOL; 17	MYB; 8	OXF; 17	NHA; 10	SBO; 23	DUB; 17	IRP; 10	ROU; 23	BRI; 11	DAR; 14	RCH; 9	DOV; 6	MAR; 11	CLT; 9	NHA; 35	CAR; 12	MAR; 3	5th	3868	
1991	Mark Thomas Racing	96	Olds	DAY; 6	RCH; 27	CAR; 11	MAR; 13	VOL; 30	HCY; 10	DAR; 10	BRI; 20	LAN; 13	SBO; 8	NZH; 15	CLT; 14	DOV; 9	ROU; 8	HCY; 7	MYB; 7	GLN; 23	OXF; 16	NHA; 11	SBO; 4	DUB; 9	IRP; 21	ROU; 23	BRI; 28	DAR; 8	RCH; 11	DOV; 9	CLT; 5	NHA; 34	CAR; 27	MAR; 14	9th	3746	
1992	Levin Racing	19	Olds	DAY; 33	CAR; 10	RCH; 23	ATL; 35	MAR; 12	DAR; 20	BRI; 11	HCY; 22	LAN; 9	DUB; 3	NZH; 28	CLT; 24	DOV; 15	ROU; 7	MYB; 6	GLN; 25	VOL; 6	NHA; 4	TAL; 24	IRP; 19	ROU; 12	MCH; 17	NHA; 21	BRI; 18	DAR; 15	RCH; 21	DOV; 17	CLT; 21	MAR; 12	CAR; 20	HCY; 16	13th	3512	
1993	Levin Racing	19	Olds					BRI; 15														BRI; 18													13th	3211	
1993	Levin Racing	19	Chevy	DAY; 15	CAR; 6	RCH; 7	DAR; 32		HCY; 7	ROU; 10	MAR; 25	NZH; 14	CLT; 12	DOV; 14	MYB; 17	GLN; 8	MLW; 5	TAL; 18	IRP; 14	MCH; 19	NHA; 19		DAR; 19	RCH; 36	DOV; 20	ROU; 7	CLT; 41	MAR; 5	CAR; 32	HCY; 18	ATL; 10				13th	3211	
1994	Grissom Racing Enterprises	31	Chevy	DAY; 10	CAR; 6	RCH; 20	ATL; 26	MAR; 25	DAR; 27	HCY; 7	BRI; 29	ROU	NHA	NZH	CLT	DOV	MYB																		39th	1090	
1994	H&H Motorsports	51	Chevy															GLN; 22	MLW	SBO	TAL	HCY													39th	1090	
1994		46	Chevy																				IRP; DNQ	MCH	BRI	DAR	RCH	DOV	CLT						39th	1090	
1994	Key Motorsports	05	Chevy																											MAR; 34	CAR; 33				39th	1090	
1995	Group III Racing	18	Ford	DAY	CAR	RCH	ATL	NSV	DAR	BRI	HCY	NHA	NZH	CLT	DOV	MYB	GLN	MLW	TAL	SBO	IRP	MCH	BRI	DAR; 19	RCH	DOV; 31									64th	267	
1995	Peck Motorsports	67	Chevy																								CLT; 24	CAR	HOM; DNQ						64th	267	
1996	Shoemaker Racing	64	Chevy	DAY	CAR	RCH	ATL	NSV	DAR	BRI	HCY	NZH; QL^{†}	CLT	DOV	SBO	MYB	GLN	MLW	NHA	TAL	IRP	MCH	BRI	DAR	RCH	DOV	CLT	CAR	HOM						N/A	-	
^{†} - Qualified for Dick Trickle
