= 1990 NASCAR Busch Series =

American motorsport season

Seasons
- ← 1989 1991 →

The 1990 NASCAR Busch Series began February 17, 1990 and ended October 28, 1990. Chuck Bown of Hensley Motorsports won the championship.

== Teams and drivers ==
=== Complete schedule ===
Manufacturer	Team	No.	Driver	Crew Chief
Buick	A.G. Dillard Motorsports	27	Elton Sawyer	Jim Harmon
Buick	Ard Motorsports	12	Jeff Burton	Sam Ard
Buick	Houston Racing	6	Tommy Houston	Scott Houston
Buick	J&J Racing	99	Tommy Ellis	Mike Hillman
Buick	Mast Racing	22	Rick Mast	Timmy Jones 22; Mann Apperson 9
Chevrolet	Jack Ingram Racing	11	Jack Ingram	Robert Ingram
Oldsmobile	Alliance Motorsports	59	Robert Pressley	Robert Gibson 20; Ricky Pearson 11
Oldsmobile	FILMAR Racing	8	Bobby Hamilton	Kip McCord
Oldsmobile	Grissom Racing	31	Steve Grissom	Bryant Frazier 8 Steve Bird 23
Oldsmobile	Labonte Motorsports	44	Bobby Labonte	Bob Labonte
Oldsmobile	Mark Thomas Racing	96	Tom Peck	Reds Kagle
Oldsmobile	Moroso Racing	25	Jimmy Hensley	Bobby King
Oldsmobile	Parker Racing	2	L. D. Ottinger	Elvin Rector
Pontiac	Hensley Motorsports	63	Chuck Bown	Jeff Hensley
Pontiac	Rusty Wallace Racing	36	Kenny Wallace	Tony Fraise 30; Steve Bird 1

=== Limited schedule ===
Manufacturer	Team	No.	Driver	Crew Chief
Buick	Barry & Associates	23	Jeff Barry 1	
Buick	Barry Cray	06	Todd Cray 2	
Buick	Bostrick Racing	39	Barry Bostick 1	
Buick	Dana Patten	86	Dana Patten 20	
Buick	Davey Johnson	26	Davey Johnson 20	
Buick	David Smith	84	David Smith 1	
Buick	Dick McCabe	0	Dick McCabe 2	
Buick	Dave Lind	0	Dave Lind 2	
Buick	Dave Lind	10	Dave Lind 2	
Buick	Fadden Automotive	16	Stub Fadden 3	Alvin Fadden
Buick	Fadden Automotive	61	Mike Olsen 1	
Buick	Armstrong Racing	61	Jeff Berry 2	
Buick	Frank Cicci Racing	34	Clifford Allison 7	John Junk
Buick	Frank Cicci Racing	34	Jack Sprague 21	John Young
Buick	Gary Balough	4	Gary Balough 3	
Buick	Porter Racing	20	Randy Porter 3	
Buick	Laughlin Racing	45	Patty Moise 28	Mike Laughlin
Buick	MAP Racing	19	Ron Moon 1	
Buick	Motion Racing	5	Barney McRae 3	Joe Small
Buick	Mountain Racing	41	Jamie Aube 12	Dick Glines
Buick	NEMCO Motorsports	87	Joe Nemechek 30	Donnie Allison
Buick	Ron Lamell	98	Ron Lamell 8	Rick Gonyon
Buick	Sigmon Racing	1	Tommy Sigmon 1	
Buick	BS&S Motorsports	94	Stanley Smith 3	Philippe Lopez
Buick	Whitaker Racing	7	Harry Gant 16	Andy Petree
Buick	Whitaker Racing	7	Rick Wilson 1	Andy Petree
Chevrolet	Bruce Haley	52	Bruce Haley 2	Gerald Mosher
Chevrolet	Dale Earnhardt, Inc.	3	Dale Earnhardt 14	Tony Eury Sr.
Chevrolet	Darrell Waltrip Motorsports	17	Darrell Waltrip 7	Sandy Jones
Chevrolet	Darrell Waltrip Motorsports	17	Larry Pearson 1	Sandy Jones
Chevrolet	Darrell Waltrip Motorsports	17	Greg Sacks 3	Sandy Jones
Chevrolet	Falcon Racing	9	Ben Hess 5	Barry Owen
Chevrolet	Falcon Racing	9	Ward Burton 11	Rick Ren
Chevrolet	Falcon Racing	9	Morgan Shepherd 10	Rick Ren
Chevrolet	Falcon Racing	18	Morgan Shepherd 10	Rick Ren
Chevrolet	Hendrick Motorsports	15	Greg Sacks 3	
Chevrolet	Hendrick Motorsports	46	Greg Sacks 3	
Chevrolet	Chesrown Racing	46	Rick Carelli 1	
Chevrolet	Jack Ingram Racing	17	Tommy Sigmon 1	
Chevrolet	KEL Racing	57	Tim Bender 1	
Chevrolet	Lasater Motorsports	05	Richard Lasater 2	
Chevrolet	Linville Racing	62	Rick Ware 2	
Chevrolet	Linville Racing	62	John Linville 1	
Chevrolet	McClure Racing	83	Jeff McClure 2	
Chevrolet	Moore Racing	47	Kelly Moore 5	
Chevrolet	Pinnacle Racing	81	Jeff Green 2	
Chevrolet	Pucci & Associates	14	Jack Sprague 1	
Chevrolet	RayLene Racing	70	Doug Didero 1	
Chevrolet	Reno Enterprises	40	Tommy Kendall 1	
Chevrolet	Reno Enterprises	40	Mike Wallace 1	
Chevrolet	Whitcomb Racing	10	Derrike Cope 1	Buddy Parrott
Ford	Bill Davis Racing	1	Mark Martin 13	Bill Davis
Ford	Roger Dion	29	Dave Dion 2	Roger Dion
Ford	Shepherd Motorsports	97	Morgan Shepherd 3	
Ford	Thurman Enterprises	24	Joe Thurman 1	
Oldsmobile	Bobby Moon	85	Bobby Moon 24	Danny Moon
Oldsmobile	Brad Teague	0	Brad Teague 1	
Oldsmobile	Brolsma Racing	18	Larry Brolsma 2	
Oldsmobile	Day Enterprise Racing	16	David Green 2	
Oldsmobile	Dick & Mary Davis	21	Dave Davis 3	Jerry Donahue
Oldsmobile	Don Jenkins	89	Don Jenkins 1	
Oldsmobile	Gary Schwab	89	Gary Schwab 1	
Oldsmobile	H&H Motorsports	51	Mike McLaughlin 8	Mike Greci
Oldsmobile	Henderson Motorsports	75	Brad Teague 5	Dennis McGuire
Oldsmobile	Henderson Motorsports	75	Ernie Irvan 5	
Oldsmobile	Henderson Motorsports	75	Jimmy Spencer 5	Jim Harmon
Oldsmobile	Kirby Racing	95	Larry Pollard 1	
Oldsmobile	Kirk Bryant	50	Kirk Bryant 2	
Oldsmobile	K. R. Rezendez, Inc.	79	Dave Rezendez 30	Darrell Bryant
Oldsmobile	Levin Racing	19	Cecil Eunice 4	
Oldsmobile	Ling Racing	66	Donny Ling Jr. 9	
Oldsmobile	Pharo Racing	33	Frank Fleming 7	Chip Lain
Oldsmobile	Pharo Racing	33	Dick Trickle 1	Chip Lain
Oldsmobile	Pharo Racing	33	Ed Berrier 13	Chip Lain
Oldsmobile	Spraker Racing	69	Jeff Spraker 6	
Oldsmobile	Triad Motorsports	48	Sterling Marlin 5	Steve Lloyd
Pontiac	Bahari Racing	30	Michael Waltrip 12	Ronnie Silver
Pontiac	Gada Racing	30	Bobby Gada 1	
Pontiac	Bob Brunell	17	Bob Brunell 1	Larry King
Pontiac	Burgess Racing	37	Rich Burgess 3	
Pontiac	Charles O'Connor	15	Mike Rowe 3	
Pontiac	Craven Racing	25	Ricky Craven 3	
Pontiac	Dennis Gagliardi	35	Mike Weeden 3	Dennis Gagliardi
Pontiac	Donald Miller	06	Ricky Miller 1	
Pontiac	Ferree Racing	49	Ed Ferree 10	Terry Allen
Pontiac	Ferree Racing	49	Rodney Combs 1	Terry Allen
Pontiac	Grubb Motorsports	14	Wayne Patterson 10	
Pontiac	Hal Goodson	98	Hal Goodson 4	
Pontiac	Harry Franssen	01	Joey Kourafas 3	
Pontiac	Henry Shaw Jr.	77	Bobby Dragon 2	Frank Woodward
Pontiac	Herb Simpson	03	Herb Simpson 1	
Pontiac	Hugh Connerty Racing	67	Jeff Gordon 3	Ray Evernham
Pontiac	Isenhower Racing	32	Dale Jarrett 19	John Ervin
Pontiac	Joe Bessey Motorsports	09	Joe Bessey	Mark Stinson 3 Rick Ren 1
Pontiac	Joe Bessey Motorsports	9	Joe Bessey	Mark Stinson 3 Rick Ren 1
Pontiac	Ken Bouchard	72	Ken Bouchard 6	
Pontiac	MacDonald Motorsports	16	Randy MacDonald 2	
Pontiac	Mac Martin Motorsports	92	Dick Trickle 2	Larry Penn
Pontiac	Mac Martin Motorsports	92	Michael Waltrip 1	Larry Penn
Pontiac	Quint Boisvert	7	Billy Clark	Quint Boisvert
Pontiac	Robert Powell	55	Robert Powell	
Pontiac	Rodney Franklin	58	Ernie Irvan 2	
Pontiac	Rodney Franklin	58	Rodney Franklin 2	
Pontiac	Rodney Franklin	58	Hut Stricklin 1	
Pontiac	Rodney Franklin	58	Jimmy Spencer 1	
Pontiac	Truex Motorsports	58	Martin Truex Sr. 1	
Pontiac	Shaw Racing	60	Dale Shaw 2	Russ Nutting
Pontiac	Standridge Motorsports	47	Billy Standridge 17	
Pontiac	Team SABCO	42	Kyle Petty 12	Gere Kennon
Pontiac	Team SABCO	42	Todd Bodine 5	Gere Kennon
Pontiac	Team SABCO	42	Bobby Hillin Jr. 2	Gere Kennon
Pontiac	Team SABCO	81	Todd Bodine 4	
Pontiac	Team SABCO	81	Bobby Hillin Jr. 1	
Pontiac	Weeb Racing	84	Steve Park 3	
Pontiac	Wes Rosner	4	Wes Rosner 1	
Buick Oldsmobile	Huffman Racing	77	Morgan Shepherd 1	
Buick Oldsmobile	Huffman Racing	77	Jay Fogleman 1	
Buick Oldsmobile	Huffman Racing	77	Jimmy Spencer 2	
Buick Oldsmobile	Huffman Racing	77	Don Burkhalter 1	
Buick Oldsmobile	Huffman Racing	77	Max Prestwood 1	
Buick Oldsmobile	Porter Racing	20	Randy Porter 3	
Buick Oldsmobile	Porter Racing	35	Mike Porter 3	
Buick Oldsmobile	Sigmon Racing	21	Tommy Sigmon 7	
Buick Oldsmobile	Team R Racing	08	Bobby Dotter 30	
Buick Chevrolet	Allison Racing	28	Hut Stricklin 1	
Buick Chevrolet	Allison Racing	28	Davey Allison 10	
Buick Chevrolet	Ard Motorsports	5	Ward Burton 11	Marshall Glass
Buick Chevrolet Oldsmobile	Phoenix Racing	15	Jeff Purvis 4	Frankie Grill
Chevrolet Pontiac	Ken Schrader Racing	52	Ken Schrader 11	Tim Kohuth
Ford Buick	LaJoie Racing	71	Randy LaJoie 8	Don LaJoie
Ford Buick	Speedway Motorsports	56	Ronald Cooper 8	Bill Woodruff
Ford Buick	Speedway Motorsports	56	Dave Mader III 12	Bill Woodruff
Ford Pontiac	Henry Shaw Racing	01	Geoff Bodine 3	Sandy MacKinnon
Ford Pontiac	Henry Shaw Racing	14	Geoff Bodine 3	Sandy MacKinnon
Oldsmobile Pontiac	Beard Motorsports	00	Rich Bickle 1	
Oldsmobile Pontiac	Beard Motorsports	00	Gary Neice 2	
Oldsmobile Pontiac	Beard Motorsports	00	Dana Patten 1	
Oldsmobile Pontiac	Beard Motorsports	00	Bobby Dotter 1	

== Races ==
=== Goody's 300 ===
The Goody's 300 was held February 17 at Daytona International Speedway. Darrell Waltrip won the pole.

Top ten results

1. #3-Dale Earnhardt
2. #7-Harry Gant
3. #46-Greg Sacks*
4. #25-Jimmy Hensley
5. #41-Elton Sawyer
6. #44-Bobby Labonte
7. #58-Ernie Irvan
8. #87-Joe Nemechek
9. #32-Dale Jarrett
10. #2-L. D. Ottinger

Did not qualify: Randy MacDonald (#16), Rick Ware (#62), Billy Standridge (#47), Bobby Dotter (#08), Mike Porter (#35), Ben Hess (#9), Joe Thurman (#24), Rich Bickle (#00), Patty Moise (#45), Geoff Bodine (#01), Randy LaJoie (#71), Steve Park (#84).

- Sacks' #46 Chevy was entered for in-race footage for the 1990 film Days of Thunder.

=== Pontiac 200 ===
The Pontiac 200 was held February 24 at Richmond International Raceway. Michael Waltrip won the pole.

Top ten results

1. #30-Michael Waltrip
2. #3-Dale Earnhardt
3. #44-Bobby Labonte
4. #32-Dale Jarrett
5. #36-Kenny Wallace
6. #63-Chuck Bown
7. #96-Tom Peck
8. #4-Elton Sawyer
9. #8-Bobby Hamilton
10. #99-Tommy Ellis

Did not qualify: Steve Grissom (#31), Frank Fleming (#33), Clifford Allison (#34).

=== Goodwrench 200 ===
The Goodwrench 200 was held March 3 at North Carolina Speedway. Harry Gant won the pole.

Top ten results

1. #3-Dale Earnhardt
2. #42-Kyle Petty
3. #36-Kenny Wallace
4. #7-Harry Gant
5. #58-Ernie Irvan
6. #99-Tommy Ellis
7. #32-Dale Jarrett
8. #1-Mark Martin 1 lap down
9. #44-Bobby Labonte 1 lap down
10. #25-Jimmy Hensley 1 lap down

=== Miller Classic ===
The Miller Classic was a 200 lap race held March 11 at Martinsville Speedway. Tommy Ellis won the pole.

Top ten results

1. #6-Tommy Houston
2. #27-Elton Sawyer
3. #32-Dale Jarrett
4. #25-Jimmy Hensley
5. #8-Bobby Hamilton
6. #08-Bobby Dotter
7. #96-Tom Peck
8. #42-Todd Bodine
9. #99-Tommy Ellis
10. #63-Chuck Bown

Did not qualify: Jack Ingram (#11).

=== Mountain Dew 400 ===
The Mountain Dew 400 was held March 25 at Hickory Motor Speedway. Chuck Bown won the pole.

Top ten results

1. #6-Tommy Houston
2. #99-Tommy Ellis
3. #63-Chuck Bown
4. #59-Robert Pressley
5. #44-Bobby Labonte
6. #36-Kenny Wallace 1 lap down
7. #11-Jack Ingram 1 lap down
8. #31-Steve Grissom 1 lap down
9. #7-Harry Gant 1 lap down
10. #27-Elton Sawyer 2 laps down

Did not qualify: Clifford Allison (#34).

=== Pontiac 200 ===
The Pontiac 200 was held March 31 at Darlington Raceway. Kenny Wallace won the pole.

Top ten results

1. #7-Harry Gant
2. #44-Bobby Labonte
3. #52-Ken Schrader
4. #2-L. D. Ottinger
5. #25-Jimmy Hensley
6. #17-Darrell Waltrip
7. #6-Tommy Houston
8. #36-Kenny Wallace 1 lap down
9. #12-Jeff Burton 1 lap down
10. #4-Ed Berrier 1 lap down

=== Budweiser 250 ===
The Budweiser 250 was held April 7 at Bristol Motor Speedway. Bobby Labonte won the pole.

Top ten results

1. #2-L. D. Ottinger
2. #32-Dale Jarrett
3. #42-Kyle Petty
4. #1-Mark Martin
5. #3-Dale Earnhardt
6. #25-Jimmy Hensley 1 lap down
7. #96-Tom Peck 2 laps down
8. #44-Bobby Labonte 2 laps down
9. #87-Joe Nemechek 2 laps down
10. #63-Chuck Bown 2 laps down
- This race is best remembered for an infamous wreck involving Michael Waltrip. Waltrip's #30 Pontiac Grand Prix hit the wall at the crossover gate in turn 2. The gate was not locked properly, so it opened, sending the #30 into the blunt end of the wall. The car was literally ripped in half. Miraculously, Waltrip emerged unscathed and competed in the Winston Cup Series' Valleydale Meats 500 the next day.

=== U-Can-Rent 200 ===
The U-Can-Rent 200 was held April 28 at Lanier National Speedway. Chuck Bown won the pole.

Top ten results

1. #63-Chuck Bown*
2. #36-Kenny Wallace
3. #99-Tommy Ellis
4. #8-Bobby Hamilton 1 lap down
5. #31-Steve Grissom 1 lap down
6. #79-Dave Rezendes 1 lap down
7. #44-Bobby Labonte 1 lap down
8. #08-Bobby Dotter 1 lap down
9. #25-Jimmy Hensley 1 lap down
10. #59-Robert Pressley 2 laps down
- Chuck Bown led all 200 laps in this race.

=== Roses Stores 200 ===
The Roses Stores 200 was held May 5 at South Boston Speedway. Jimmy Hensley won the pole.

Top ten results

1. #63-Chuck Bown
2. #12-Jeff Burton
3. #31-Steve Grissom
4. #25-Jimmy Hensley
5. #22-Rick Mast
6. #6-Tommy Houston
7. #8-Bobby Hamilton
8. #11-Jack Ingram
9. #59-Robert Pressley
10. #27-Elton Sawyer

=== Pontiac 300 ===
The Pontiac 300 was held May 12 at Nazareth Speedway. Davey Allison won the pole.

Top ten results

1. #25-Jimmy Hensley
2. #79-Dave Rezendes
3. #63-Chuck Bown
4. #9-Morgan Shepherd
5. #31-Steve Grissom
6. #26-Davey Johnson
7. #36-Kenny Wallace
8. #8-Bobby Hamilton
9. #6-Tommy Houston
10. #28-Davey Allison

=== Granger Select 200 ===
The Granger Select 200 was held May 19 at Hickory Motor Speedway. Chuck Bown won the pole.

Top ten results

1. #63-Chuck Bown
2. #6-Tommy Houston
3. #77-Jimmy Spencer
4. #59-Robert Pressley
5. #44-Bobby Labonte
6. #8-Bobby Hamilton
7. #31-Steve Grissom
8. #22-Rick Mast
9. #7-Harry Gant 1 lap down
10. #36-Kenny Wallace 1 lap down

=== Champion 300 ===
The Champion 300 was held May 26 at Charlotte Motor Speedway. Dick Trickle won the pole.

Top ten results

1. #32-Dale Jarrett
2. #92-Dick Trickle
3. #7-Harry Gant
4. #48-Sterling Marlin
5. #99-Tommy Ellis
6. #28-Davey Allison
7. #25-Jimmy Hensley
8. #3-Dale Earnhardt
9. #36-Kenny Wallace
10. #44-Bobby Labonte

Did not qualify: Jack Ingram (#11), Bobby Dotter (#08), Ward Burton (#9), Jeff McClure (#83), Ken Bouchard (#72), Jeff Berry (#61), Todd Taylor (#29), Ed Berrier (#4).

=== Budweiser 200 ===
The Budweiser 200 was held June 2 at Dover International Speedway. Bobby Labonte won the pole.

Top ten results

1. #30-Michael Waltrip
2. #7-Harry Gant
3. #44-Bobby Labonte
4. #96-Tom Peck
5. #56-Ronald Cooper
6. #6-Tommy Houston
7. #33-Dick Trickle
8. #63-Chuck Bown
9. #27-Elton Sawyer
10. #11-Jack Ingram

Did not qualify: Ed Berrier (#4), Dave Lind (#10), Dale Jarrett (#32), Kyle Petty (#42), Rick Carelli (#46), Mike McLaughlin (#51), Jimmy Spencer (#58), Randy LaJoie (#71), Dennis Curtis (#81), Stanley Smith (#94).

=== Roses Stores 200 ===
The Roses Stores 200 was held June 9 at Orange County Speedway. Jeff Burton won the pole. The race was televised by SportsChannel.

Top ten results

1. #63-Chuck Bown
2. #79-Dave Rezendes
3. #11-Jack Ingram
4. #8-Bobby Hamilton
5. #12-Jeff Burton
6. #34-Jack Sprague
7. #42-Todd Bodine
8. #86-Dana Patten
9. #96-Tom Peck
10. #44-Bobby Labonte 1 lap down
- This race featured a thrilling race for the lead late in the event. Bown, Rezendes and Ingram were 3 wide for the lead with about 20 laps to go.

=== Firecracker 200 ===
The Firecracker 200 was held June 23 at Volusia County Speedway. Chuck Bown won the pole.

Top ten results

1. #6-Tommy Houston
2. #27-Elton Sawyer
3. #8-Bobby Hamilton
4. #31-Steve Grissom
5. #63-Chuck Bown
6. #87-Joe Nemechek
7. #11-Jack Ingram
8. #25-Jimmy Hensley
9. #08-Bobby Dotter
10. #79-Dave Rezendes

=== Carolina Pride/Budweiser 200 ===
The Carolina Pride/Budweiser 200 was held June 30 at Myrtle Beach Speedway. Tommy Ellis won the pole.

Top ten results

1. #1-Mark Martin
2. #2-L. D. Ottinger
3. #36-Kenny Wallace
4. #08-Bobby Dotter
5. #87-Joe Nemechek
6. #56-Dave Mader III
7. #99-Tommy Ellis
8. #96-Tom Peck -1 lap
9. #63-Chuck Bown -1 lap
10. #44-Bobby Labonte -1 lap

=== True Value Oxford 250 ===
The True Value Oxford 250 was a 250 green flag lap race held July 8 at Oxford Plains Speedway in Oxford, Maine. Joey Kourafas won the pole.

Top ten results

1. #63-Chuck Bown
2. #6-Tommy Houston
3. #01-Joey Kourafas
4. #22-Rick Mast
5. #79-Dave Rezendes 1 lap down
6. #41-Jamie Aube 1 lap down
7. #44-Bobby Labonte 1 lap down
8. #31-Steve Grissom 2 laps down
9. #7-Billy Clark 2 laps down
10. #15-Mike Rowe 3 laps down

Did not qualify: Wes Rosner (#4), Barney McRae (#5), Bob Brunell (#17), Davey Johnson (#26), Ed St. Angelo (#33), Patty Moise (#45), Mike McLaughlin (#51), Bruce Haley (#52), Mike Olsen (#61), Dean Chrystal (#65), Dave Smith (#84), Joe Nemechek (#87), Larry Caron (#88)

NOTE: This is a joint Busch/Busch North series race. Under the rules of Oxford Plains Speedway for the Oxford 250, only green flag laps count towards the 250-lap distance.

=== Budweiser 300 ===
The inaugural Budweiser 300 was held July 15 at New Hampshire International Speedway. Jimmy Hensley won the pole.

Top ten results

1. #99-Tommy Ellis
2. #7-Harry Gant
3. #63-Chuck Bown
4. #9-Morgan Shepherd
5. #22-Rick Mast
6. #51-Mike McLaughlin
7. #3-Dale Earnhardt
8. #32-Dale Jarrett
9. #08-Bobby Dotter
10. #96-Tom Peck

Did not qualify: Joey Kourafas (#01), Joe Bessey (#09), Steve Park (#84), Mike Rowe (#15), Herb Simpson (#03), Jeff Barry (#23), Larry Brolsma (#18), Dave Davis (#21), Barney McRae (#5), Dale Shaw (#60), Ricky Miller (#06), Stub Fadden (#16), Gary Schwab (#89), Dave Lind (#0), Alan Strobridge (#6), Mike Weeden (#35), Bobby Gada (#36), Patty Moise (#45), Donny Ling Jr. (#66).

- Bobby Labonte had flipped in this race when he was clipped hard, got it upside down, hit the wall and tumbled 2 times.

=== Coors 200 ===
The Coors 200 was held July 21 at South Boston Speedway. Jimmy Hensley won the pole.

Top ten results

1. #6-Tommy Houston
2. #63-Chuck Bown
3. #8-Bobby Hamilton
4. #22-Rick Mast
5. #31-Steve Grissom
6. #9-Ward Burton 1 lap down
7. #99-Tommy Ellis 1 lap down
8. #44-Bobby Labonte 2 laps down
9. #21-Tommy Sigmon 2 laps down
10. #33-Ed Berrier 2 laps down

=== Granger Select 200 ===
The Granger Select 200 was held July 28 at New River Valley Speedway in Dublin, Virginia. Steve Grissom won the pole.

Top ten results

1. #31-Steve Grissom*
2. #63-Chuck Bown
3. #25-Jimmy Hensley
4. #6-Tommy Houston
5. #87-Joe Nemechek
6. #79-Dave Rezendes
7. #9-Ward Burton
8. #59-Robert Pressley
9. #36-Kenny Wallace
10. #35-Mike Porter
- This was Steve Grissom's first career Busch Grand National victory.

=== Kroger 200 ===
The Kroger 200 was held August 4 at Indianapolis Raceway Park. Jimmy Hensley won the pole.

Top ten results

1. #31-Steve Grissom
2. #75-Ernie Irvan
3. #3-Dale Earnhardt
4. #63-Chuck Bown
5. #59-Robert Pressley
6. #27-Elton Sawyer
7. #96-Tom Peck
8. #33-Ed Berrier
9. #79-Dave Rezendes
10. #56-Dave Mader III

=== Texas Pete 200 ===
The Texas Pete 200 was held August 11 at Orange County Speedway. Ed Berrier won the pole.

Top ten results

1. #63-Chuck Bown
2. #2-L. D. Ottinger
3. #59-Robert Pressley
4. #25-Jimmy Hensley
5. #27-Elton Sawyer
6. #8-Bobby Hamilton 1 lap down
7. #08-Bobby Dotter 1 lap down
8. #85-Bobby Moon 1 lap down
9. #99-Tommy Ellis 1 lap down
10. #22-Rick Mast 2 laps down

=== Jay Johnson 250 ===
The Jay Johnson 250 was held August 24 at Bristol Motor Speedway. Bobby Labonte won the pole.

Top ten results

1. #22-Rick Mast
2. #32-Dale Jarrett
3. #31-Steve Grissom
4. #79-Dave Rezendes
5. #6-Tommy Houston
6. #1-Mark Martin
7. #8-Bobby Hamilton
8. #28-Davey Allison 1 lap down
9. #99-Tommy Ellis 1 lap down
10. #25-Jimmy Hensley 1 lap down

Did not qualify: Harry Gant (#7), Morgan Shepherd (#9), Jack Ingram (#11).

=== Gatorade 200 ===
The Gatorade 200 was held September 1 at Darlington Raceway. Greg Sacks won the pole.

Top ten results

1. #32-Dale Jarrett
2. #7-Harry Gant
3. #30-Michael Waltrip
4. #42-Bobby Hillin Jr.
5. #25-Jimmy Hensley
6. #9-Morgan Shepherd
7. #28-Davey Allison
8. #56-Dave Mader III 1 lap down
9. #36-Kenny Wallace 1 lap down
10. #44-Bobby Labonte 1 lap down

=== Autolite 200 ===
The Autolite 200 was held September 8 at Richmond International Raceway. Michael Waltrip won the pole.

Top ten results

1. #22-Rick Mast
2. #31-Steve Grissom
3. #30-Michael Waltrip
4. #3-Dale Earnhardt
5. #25-Jimmy Hensley
6. #36-Kenny Wallace
7. #59-Robert Pressley
8. #32-Dale Jarrett
9. #96-Tom Peck
10. #7-Harry Gant

=== Ames/Splitfire 200 ===
The Ames/Splitfire 200 was held September 15 at Dover International Speedway. Tommy Ellis won the pole.

Top ten results

1. #7-Harry Gant
2. #22-Rick Mast
3. #81-Todd Bodine
4. #32-Dale Jarrett
5. #8-Bobby Hamilton
6. #96-Tom Peck 1 lap down
7. #31-Steve Grissom 2 laps down
8. #36-Kenny Wallace 2 laps down
9. #56-Dave Mader III 2 laps down
10. #25-Jimmy Hensley 2 laps down

=== Zerex 150 ===
The Zerex 150 was held September 22 at Martinsville Speedway. Rick Mast won the pole.

Top ten results

1. #12-Jeff Burton*
2. #59-Robert Pressley
3. #32-Dale Jarrett
4. #85-Bobby Moon
5. #2-L. D. Ottinger
6. #75-Jimmy Spencer
7. #25-Jimmy Hensley
8. #36-Kenny Wallace
9. #08-Bobby Dotter
10. #56-Dave Mader III
- This was Jeff Burton's first career Busch Grand National victory.

=== All Pro 300 ===
The All Pro 300 was held October 6 at Charlotte Motor Speedway. Chuck Bown won the pole.

Top ten results

1. #48-Sterling Marlin*
2. #15-Greg Sacks
3. #32-Dale Jarrett
4. #3-Dale Earnhardt
5. #8-Bobby Hamilton
6. #6-Tommy Houston
7. #9-Ward Burton
8. #56-Dave Mader III
9. #96-Tom Peck
10. #52-Ken Schrader
- This was Sterling Marlin's first career Busch Grand National victory.

=== NE Chevy 250 ===
The inaugural NE Chevy 250 was held October 14 at New Hampshire International Speedway. Ricky Craven won the pole.

Top ten results

1. #22-Rick Mast
2. #44-Bobby Labonte
3. #51-Mike McLaughlin
4. #25-Ricky Craven
5. #99-Tommy Ellis 1 lap down
6. #27-Elton Sawyer 1 lap down
7. #08-Bobby Dotter 1 lap down
8. #85-Bobby Moon 1 lap down
9. #12-Jeff Burton 1 lap down
10. #33-Ed Berrier 1 lap down

=== AC-Delco 200 ===
The AC-Delco 200 was held October 20 at North Carolina Speedway. Dave Mader III won the pole.

Top ten results

1. #31-Steve Grissom
2. #3-Dale Earnhardt
3. #97-Morgan Shepherd
4. #1-Mark Martin
5. #56-Dave Mader III
6. #28-Davey Allison
7. #7-Harry Gant 1 lap down
8. #99-Tommy Ellis 1 lap down
9. #32-Dale Jarrett 1 lap down
10. #42-Bobby Hillin Jr. 1 lap down

Did not qualify: Richard Lasater (#05), Rich Burgess (#37), Barry Bostick (#39), Jimmy Spencer (#75), Joe Nemechek (#87), Randy Baker (#88).

- This race marked the Busch Grand National debut of 19-year-old Jeff Gordon in the #67 Pontiac Grand Prix. Gordon qualified on the outside pole, but crashed out after 33 laps and finished 39th.

=== Winston Classic ===
The Winston Classic was a 200 lap race held October 28 at Martinsville Speedway. Chuck Bown won the pole.

Top ten results

1. #31-Steve Grissom
2. #6-Tommy Houston
3. #96-Tom Peck
4. #51-Mike McLaughlin
5. #11-Jack Ingram
6. #40-Mike Wallace
7. #44-Bobby Labonte
8. #8-Bobby Hamilton
9. #2-L. D. Ottinger
10. #62-John Linville

Did not qualify: Max Prestwood (#77), Jeff Gordon (#67), Doug Didero (#70).

== Full Drivers' Championship ==
(key) Bold – Pole position awarded by time. Italics – Pole position set by owner's points. * – Most laps led. ** - All laps led.

Pos	Driver	DAY	RCH	CAR	MAR	HCY	DAR	BRI	LAN	SBO	NAZ	HCY	CLT	DOV	ROU	VOL	MYB	OXF	NHA	SBO	DUB	IRP	ROU	BRI	DAR	RCH	DOV	MAR	CLT	NHA	CAR	MAR	Pts
1	Chuck Bown	21	6	12	10	**3**	13	10	**1****	1	3	**1***	17	8	1*	**5**	9	1*	3	2*	2	4	1*	17	13	21	12	17	13	24	18	27	4372
2	Jimmy Hensley	4	17	10	4	11	5	6	9	**4***	1	19	7	14	14	8	19	18	**15**	**14**	3	**11**	4	10	5	5	10	7	15	12	25	24	4172
3	Steve Grissom	33	25	15	24	8	20	16	5	3	5*	7	27	21	22	4	11	8	23	5	**1***	1*	17	3	16	2*	7	21	32	26	1	1	3982
4	Bobby Labonte	6	3	9	19	5	2	8	7	12	19	5	10	**3**	10	18	10	7	41	8	12	22	29	**15**	10	11	37	14	12	2	16	7	3977
5	Tom Peck	18	7	18	7	16	11	7	18	18	12	17	14	4	9	17	8	17	10	23	11	7	23	21	14	9	6	11	9	35	12	3	3868
6	Tommy Ellis	35	10	6	**9***	2	18	21	3	15	20	14	5	33	15	14	**7***	15	1*	7	18	16	9	9	11	15	**27***	27	28	5	8	12	3829
7	Kenny Wallace	25	5	3	29	6	**8**	19	2	25	7	10	9	13	27	11	3	20	24	19	9	14	14	20	9	6	8	8	11	41	14	13*	3829
8	L. D. Ottinger	10	20	26	27	12	4	1*	22	19	16	11	11	28	24	23	2	11	20	18	22	17	2	12	15	18	18	5	18	13	21	9	3693
9	Tommy Houston	38	12	21	1	1*	7	27	12	6	9	2	34	6	18	1*	27	2	26	1	4	34	13	5	37	34	11	32	6	45	40	2	3667
10	Rick Mast	27	32	25	14	18	14	12	25	5	15	8	32	34	12	29	12	4	5	4	19	30	10	1	27	1	2	**25**	23	1*	17	32	3617
11	Bobby Hamilton	11	9	35	5	26	12	11	4	7	8	6	36	25	4	3	23	27	38	3	20	29	6	7	21	14	5	24	5	42	34	8	3616
12	Robert Pressley	15	29	34	26	4	21	15	10	9	11	4	23	11	19	13	16	33	29	16	8	5	3	18	18	7	23	2*	24	30	31	29	3504
13	Elton Sawyer	5	8	19	2	10	27	30	27	10	14	23	19	9	17	2	22	29	25	24	28	6	5	31	41	12	25	18	34	6	13	15	3442
14	Bobby Dotter	DNQ	19	22	6	22	24	22	8	17	13	13	DNQ	18	16	9	4	14	9	13	16	21	7	13	29	28	17	9	39	7	23	11	3351
15	Jeff Burton	19	11	13	11	15	9	23	11	2	32	16	28	30	**5**	27	13	21	11	20	27	35	12	28	19	27	22	1	37	9	29	22	3342
16	Dave Rezendes	16	27	20	22		38	20	6	27	2	29	26	22	2	10	18	5	44	12	6	9	11	4	30	25	28	15	38	17	28	19	3217
17	Joe Nemechek **(R)**	8	18		15	23	19	9	20	20	34	20	38	27	25	6	5	DNQ	19	21	5	23	18	14	20	16	15	22	27	19	DNQ	16	3022
18	Jack Ingram	29	21	16	DNQ	7	16	14	14	8	18	26	DNQ	10	3	7	30	13	18	15	21	36	25	DNQ	39	20	33	30	14	40	36	5	2902
19	Dale Jarrett	9	4	7	3	27	35	2				DNQ	1	DNQ			17		8			12		2	1	8	4	3	3		9		2473
20	Bobby Moon **(R)**					28	34		29	14	26	21	20	15	11	12	25		34	17	24		8	23	36	32	38	4	33	8	32	20	2295
21	Ward Burton **(R)**		15	27	17		30	18	13	26	30	12	DNQ		13	25	31			6	7		16	30	40	24	40		7	27	22	21	2271
22	Patty Moise	DNQ	31	40			23	28	19		33	30	13	23	20	19	14	DNQ	DNQ	26	29	24	20	25	23	23		12	26	20	30	23	2190
23	Harry Gant	2	34	**4**	28	9	1*					9	3	2					2					DNQ	2	10	1*		30		7		2134
24	Jack Sprague **(R)**	40									24	18	30	20	6	21	15	12	21	11	17	25	15	22	25		36	20	35	46	19	17	2106
25	Dana Patten **(R)**	12	13	14	12	17	33	24	23	23	29	25	15	31	8	24	20	42	39						24		21		22				2013
26	Dale Earnhardt	1*	2	1		20	29	5					8						7			3		24*	38	4			4		2		1947
27	Davey Johnson **(R)**	14		32	23		41	17	21	30	6	15	22	12	29	28	21	DNQ	46	22	13	20	19										1809
28	Ed Berrier	34		17			10						DNQ	DNQ	23				14	10		8	**26**	32	22	17	14	16	40	10	20	30	1748
29	Billy Standridge	DNQ				13			24	28		22	21		21	15				25	14	18	30	19	26			23	25			14	1594
30	Dave Mader III **(R)**															30	6		35			10		11	8	13	9	10	8	37	**5**		1432
31	Mark Martin		35	8			36	4					31	24			1							6	28*	DNQ	34		16		4*		1321
32	Jamie Aube		14	30	13	14	26			29	17			19				6	17			15								29			1274
33	Michael Waltrip	36	**1***	11		19		26					18	1*					16			28		29	3	**3**			21				1185
34	Morgan Shepherd	44				24					4		39	35			29	36	4			26		DNQ	6	DNQ			36		3	31	1171
35	Kyle Petty	32	30*	2*			37	3			36		25	DNQ					22			13		16			30						1079
36	Davey Allison						31				**10**		6									19		8	7	26			31	16	6		1018
37	Ken Schrader	28		36			3				31		24						40			27			31		24		10		11		1010
38	Wayne Patterson		16		18					16					28					27	26		28			19		19				28	955
39	Todd Bodine				8					13					7			23	36							30	3		DNQ	39			772
40	Tommy Sigmon				16	30			17			27					28			9	25							29					763
41	Ed Ferree **(R)**				30		32		26	24	37		QL	17					12			33					19		DNQ	31			762
42	Ernie Irvan	7		5									40	26								2		27	34				DNQ				742
43	Ronald Cooper	42	26	38			39	13	15				16	5																			729
44	Ron Lamell		24	28							27			29				31	30								16			21			686
45	Greg Sacks	3											12												**33**	31	35		2				654
46	Jimmy Spencer											3		DNQ											17		26	6	19		DNQ	18	642
47	Mike McLaughlin	39												DNQ				DNQ	6							29			17	3		4	633
48	Sterling Marlin	24											4												12		32		1*				625
49	Brad Teague	31		24			15		16	22											15												609
50	Darrell Waltrip	**30**					6						29	36															DNQ	34	15		533
51	Frank Fleming **(R)**	20	DNQ			21	40			21	22	28																					522
52	Donny Ling Jr.		QL		31				28		35		41					32	DNQ							DNQ				22		25	499
53	Clifford Allison **(R)**	13	DNQ	29	25	DNQ	17	25																									488
54	Billy Clark																	9	13								20			28			444
55	Kelly Moore	17	33															19	27											32			431
56	Ken Bouchard												DNQ	16				37	37								13			38			392
57	Jeff Spraker			41							21			32				39	31			32											390
58	Ben Hess	DNQ		33	21	25	22																										349
59	Hal Goodson																24				23				35				DNQ		26		328
60	Randy LaJoie		23	37														28	28								31			44			326
61	Joey Kourafas																	**3**	DNQ											18			274
62	Dick Trickle	23											**2***	7															DNQ				264
63	Mike Rowe																	10	DNQ											11			264
64	Randy Porter								30							20	26																261
65	Ricky Craven																	34	42											**4**			258
66	Joe Bessey		22															35	DNQ								39			36			256
67	Cecil Eunice															26												28	29		27		237
68	Gary Balough																								32		29		DNQ		33		207
69	Jay Fogleman									11													27					13					206
70	Gary Neice															16				28													194
71	Todd Cray														26								21										185
72	Stub Fadden																	22	DNQ											25			185
73	Rich Burgess											24											24						DNQ		DNQ		182
74	Jeff Purvis	26	36										35											26									170
75	Todd Taylor		28				25						DNQ																				167
76	Mike Weeden																	40	DNQ											14			164
77	Dave Davis				32													25	DNQ														155
78	Stanley Smith													DNQ															20		37		155
79	Mike Wallace																															6	150
80	Bobby Dragon																	16	43														149
81	David Green					29																				33			DNQ				140
82	Mike Porter	DNQ																			10							26					134
83	John Linville																															10	134
84	Dick McCabe																	26												43			119
85	Tommy Kendall																													15			118
86	Dave Dion																	41	33														104
87	Martin Truex Sr.				20																												103
88	Jeff McClure	22											DNQ																				97
89	Jeff Green																									22			DNQ		38		97
90	Richard Lasater																						22								DNQ		97
91	Don Burkhalter															22																	97
92	Kirk Bryant	43		23																													94
93	Barney McRae																	DNQ	DNQ											23			94
94	Larry Brolsma										23								DNQ														94
95	Rick Ware	DNQ									25																						88
96	Randy Baker			39									42																DNQ		DNQ		83
97	Geoff Bodine	DNQ					28											24															79
98	Steve Park	DNQ									28								DNQ														79
99	Ron Moon																	30															73
100	Jeff Berry												DNQ								30								DNQ				73
101	Randy MacDonald	DNQ		31																													70
102	Larry Pearson																					31											70
103	Robert Powell																32												DNQ				67
104	Derrike Cope																		32										DNQ				67
105	Bruce Haley																	DNQ												33			64
106	Larry Pollard																														35		58
107	Hut Stricklin	37											33																				52
108	Bobby Gada																	38	DNQ														49
109	Don Jenkins	41																															40
110	Dale Shaw																	43	DNQ														34
111	Rodney Franklin										38								45														28
112	Rick Wilson							29																									
113	Bobby Hillin Jr.																								4				DNQ		10	26	
114	Tim Bender																												DNQ		24		
115	Jeff Gordon																												DNQ		39	DNQ	
116	Max Prestwood																											31				DNQ	
117	Rodney Combs												37																				
118	Rich Bickle	DNQ																															
119	Joe Thurman	DNQ																															
120	Dennis Curtis													DNQ																			
121	Dave Lind													DNQ					DNQ														
122	Rick Carelli													DNQ																			
123	Wes Rosner																	DNQ															
124	Bob Brunell																	DNQ															
125	Ed St. Angelo																	DNQ															
126	Mike Olsen																	DNQ															
127	Dean Chrystal																	DNQ															
128	David Smith																	DNQ															
129	Larry Caron																	DNQ															
130	Herb Simpson																		DNQ														
131	Ricky Miller																		DNQ														
132	Gary Schwab																		DNQ														
133	Alan Strobridge																		DNQ														
134	Peter Sospenzo																												DNQ				
135	Barry Bostick																														DNQ		
136	Doug Didero																															DNQ	
137	Mark Beard	Wth																															
Pos	Driver	DAY	RCH	CAR	MAR	HCY	DAR	BRI	LAN	SBO	NAZ	HCY	CLT	DOV	ROU	VOL	MYB	OXF	NHA	SBO	DUB	IRP	ROU	BRI	DAR	RCH	DOV	MAR	CLT	NHA	CAR	MAR	Pts

== Rookie of the Year ==
Joe Nemechek was named the 1990 NASCAR Busch Series Rookie of the Year, posting two top-five finishes and garnering a seventeenth-place points finish despite missing three races. The top runner-up was Bobby Moon, followed closely Ward Burton and Dana Patten, the only other candidates to try a full schedule. Among the other rookies in 1990 were Jack Sprague, Dave Mader III, and Clifford Allison.

== See also ==
- 1990 NASCAR Winston Cup Series
- 1990 NASCAR Winston West Series
