= Richard Lasater =

American racing driver and crew chief

- Born: October 6, 1965 (age 61); Little Rock, Arkansas, U.S.

NASCAR O'Reilly Auto Parts Series career
- 80 races run over 5 years
- Best finish: 8th (1992)
- First race: 1990 Texas Pete 200 (Orange County)
- Last race: 1994 Goodwrench/Delco 200 (Dover)
Wins	Top tens	Poles
0	2	0

Richard Lasater (born October 6, 1965) is an American former stock car racing driver and crew chief. Lasater competed in 80 NASCAR Busch Series (now NASCAR O'Reilly Auto Parts Series) races between 1990 and 1994, reaching the top-ten twice. He served as crew chief in the NASCAR Busch Series for drivers Tim Fedewa and Kevin Lepage.

== Motorsports career results ==
=== NASCAR ===
(key) (Bold – Pole position awarded by qualifying time. Italics – Pole position earned by points standings or practice time. * – Most laps led.)

==== Busch Grand National Series ====
NASCAR Busch Grand National Series results
Year	Team	No.	Make	1	2	3	4	5	6	7	8	9	10	11	12	13	14	15	16	17	18	19	20	21	22	23	24	25	26	27	28	29	30	31	NBGNSC	Pts	Ref
1990	Lasater Motorsports	05	Chevy	DAY	RCH	CAR	MAR	HCY	DAR	BRI	LAN	SBO	NZH	HCY	CLT	DOV	ROU	VOL	MYB	OXF	NHA	SBO	DUB	IRP	ROU; 22	BRI	DAR	RCH	DOV	MAR	CLT	NHA	CAR; DNQ	MAR	90th	97	
1991	Lasater Motorsports	05	Pontiac	DAY; 22	RCH	CAR; 32	MAR			DAR; 21	BRI; 19	LAN			CLT; 33	DOV; 21	ROU		MYB; 24	GLN	OXF	NHA					BRI; 23	DAR; 20	RCH; 27	DOV; 19	CLT; 25	NHA	CAR; 32	MAR	25th	1989	
1991	Lasater Motorsports	05	Chevy						HCY; 11				SBO; 22	NZH				HCY; 21					SBO; 14	DUB; 20	IRP; 27	ROU; 14									25th	1989	
1991	Beard Motorsports	00	Olds					VOL; 31																											25th	1989	
1992	Sam Ard Racing	5	Pontiac	DAY; DNQ	CAR; 27		ATL; 39		DAR; 29	BRI; 16					CLT; 20	DOV; 19	ROU; 21		GLN; 26	VOL	NHA	TAL; 28			MCH; 20	NHA		DAR; 32			CLT; 25		CAR; 22		18th	2571	
1992	Sam Ard Racing	5	Buick			RCH; 22		MAR; 20						NZH; 25				MYB; 17					IRP; 28									MAR; 19			18th	2571	
1992	Sam Ard Racing	5	Chevy								HCY; 26	LAN; 20	DUB; 15											ROU; 14			BRI; 8		RCH; 32	DOV; 27				HCY; 14	18th	2571	
1993	Lasater Motorsports	5	Chevy	DAY; 10		RCH; 24		BRI; 11				NZH; 32	CLT; 14			GLN; 18	MLW; 23	TAL; 32	IRP	MCH; 31	NHA; 21	BRI; 28	DAR; 42	RCH; DNQ	DOV; 16		CLT; 21	MAR; 24	CAR; 40		ATL; 19				21st	2339	
1993	Lasater Motorsports	5	Pontiac		CAR; 19		DAR; 20							DOV; 34																					21st	2339	
1993	Lasater Motorsports	5	Buick						HCY; 17	ROU; 15	MAR; 29				MYB; 28										ROU; 11					HCY; DNQ					21st	2339	
1994	Lasater Motorsports	5	Chevy	DAY; DNQ	CAR; 34	RCH; DNQ	ATL; 22	MAR; 23	DAR; 40	HCY; DNQ	BRI; 32	ROU; DNQ	NHA	NZH	CLT; DNQ	DOV; 37	MYB	GLN	MLW; DNQ	SBO	TAL; DNQ	HCY	IRP	MCH	BRI	DAR	RCH	DOV	CLT	MAR	CAR				56th	414	
