= Doug Didero =

- Born: August 18, 1960 (age 66); Hamilton, Ontario, Canada

NASCAR O'Reilly Auto Parts Series career
- 3 races run over 2 years
- Best finish: 78th (1992)
- First race: 1991 Mountain Dew 400 (Hickory)
- Last race: 1992 Autolite 200 (Richmond)
Wins	Top tens	Poles
0	0	0

Doug Didero (born August 18, 1960 in Hamilton, Ontario and currently living in Mooresville, North Carolina), is a former driver in the Indy Racing League. He raced in the 1999–2000 seasons with six career starts. His best career IRL finish was in fourteenth position in the Delphi Indy 200 at Walt Disney World Speedway. In 1991–1992, he raced three times in the NASCAR Busch Series.

Didero is best known for his success in the Supermodified division at Oswego Speedway and in ISMA, where he and car owner Skip Matczak won two dozen features on his way to three consecutive Track Championships in 1994, 1995 and 1996, capped by wins in the 1996 International Classic. He is also one of the all-time winningest drivers in the history of the track.

After years away from the sport in the late '90s/early 2000s, Didero returned to semi-regular Supermodified racing, and was the winner of the 2008 Oswego Speedway International Classic 200 driving a supermodified on its maiden voyage on the track. Following this, Didero returned to full-time racing action with moderate success. He retired at the end of the 2010 season after conflicts with his car owner as well as other drivers at the track.

== Motorsports career results ==
=== NASCAR ===
(key) (Bold – Pole position awarded by qualifying time. Italics – Pole position earned by points standings or practice time. * – Most laps led.)

==== Busch Series ====
NASCAR Busch Series results
Year	Team	No.	Make	1	2	3	4	5	6	7	8	9	10	11	12	13	14	15	16	17	18	19	20	21	22	23	24	25	26	27	28	29	30	31	NBSC	Pts	Ref
1990	RayLene Racing	70	Chevy	DAY	RCH	CAR	MAR	HCY	DAR	BRI	LAN	SBO	NZH	HCY	CLT	DOV	ROU	VOL	MYB	OXF	NHA	SBO	DUB	IRP	ROU	BRI	DAR	RCH	DOV	MAR	CLT	NHA	CAR	MAR; DNQ	NA	-	
1991	Rayner Racing	70	Pontiac	DAY	RCH	CAR	MAR	VOL	HCY; 25	DAR	BRI	LAN	SBO	NZH	CLT	DOV	ROU	HCY	MYB	GLN	OXF	NHA	SBO	DUB	IRP	ROU	BRI	DAR	RCH	DOV	CLT; DNQ	NHA	CAR	MAR; DNQ	95th	88	
1992	Rayner Racing	70	Pontiac	DAY	CAR	RCH	ATL	MAR	DAR	BRI	HCY	LAN	DUB	NZH	CLT	DOV	ROU	MYB	GLN	VOL	NHA	TAL	IRP	ROU; 17	MCH	NHA	BRI	DAR							78th	194	
1992	Rayner Racing	46	Pontiac																										RCH; 27	DOV	CLT	MAR	CAR	HCY	78th	194	

=== American open–wheel racing results ===
(key) (Races in bold indicate pole position)

==== Indy Racing League ====
Indy Racing League results
Year	Team	No.	Chassis	Engine	1	2	3	4	5	6	7	8	9	10	11	Rank	Pts	Ref
1999	Mid America Motorsports	43	Dallara	Oldsmobile	WDW	PHX	CLT	INDY	TXS	PPR	ATL	DOV	PPR	LVS	TXS; 20	42nd	10	
2000	Mid America Motorsports	43	Dallara	Oldsmobile	WDW; 14	PHX; 25	LVS; 19	INDY; DNQ	TXS; 27	PPR; 22	ATL	KTY	TXS			26th	43	

==== Indianapolis 500 ====
Year	Chassis	Engine	Start	Finish	Team	Ref
2000	Dallara	Oldsmobile	DNQ		Mid America Motorsports	
