= Cavin Councilor =

American racing driver

- Born: Cavin Robert Councilor; August 27, 1963; Flint, Michigan, U.S.
- Died: June 19, 2002 (aged 38); Naples, Florida, U.S.

ARCA Menards Series career
- 57 races run over 5 years
- Best finish: 9th (1999)
- First race: 1997 MediaOne 200 (Michigan)
- Last race: 2001 Memphis ARCA 150 (Memphis)
Wins	Top tens	Poles
0	10	0
- Statistics up to date as of March 26, 2024.

Cavin Robert Councilor (born August 27, 1963 – June 19, 2002) was an American professional stock car racing driver and team owner. He had competed in the ARCA Re/Max Series from 1997 to 2001.

== Racing career ==
In 1997, Councilor made his debut in the ARCA Bondo/Mar-Hyde Series at Michigan International Speedway, driving his self-owned No. 95 Ford, where he was running as high as second in the race before finishing 30th due to a crash that was the result of a broken axle. He then made one more ARCA start that year at Talladega Superspeedway, where he finished four laps down in fourteenth place. It was also during this year where he made select starts in the USAR Pro Cup Series, getting a best finish of fourteenth at Birmingham International Raceway. In 1998, Councilor expanded his ARCA program, running in a majority of the races held that year with four top-tens with a best finish of seventh at Kil-Kare Speedway and Winchester Speedway.

In 1999, Councilor ran the full ARCA schedule, driving the No. 19 Chevrolet. Across the year, he earned one top-five and four top-ten finishes with a best finish of fifth at Winchester, where he started on the front row. He then ran all but two races the following year in 2000, getting two top-ten finishes at Kentucky Speedway and Berlin Raceway on his way to finish thirteenth in the final points standings.

In 2001, Councilor made only two starts, finishing 29th at Nashville Superspeedway due to a crash, and thirteenth at Memphis Motorsports Park, which proved to be his final start as a driver. Despite his driver career ending, he still remained in the now ARCA Re/Max Series as a team owner, with multiple drivers piloting the No. 19, with Ed Berrier driving a majority of the races held that year, and taking a win at Chicagoland Speedway. Councilor also fielded a NASCAR Busch Series entry for Berrier at Kansas Speedway, where Berrier finished in 43rd to due a crash ten laps into the race.

== Personal life & death ==
Councilor graduated from Michigan State High School in 1981, where he was a cross-country champion, and attended Florida State University, receiving dual bachelor's degrees in both criminology and economics.

=== Death ===
On June 19, 2002, Councilor was flying a single-engine, propeller-driven Piper PA-46 alongside two other passengers in Naples, Florida, when the plane hit nose first just after taking off near the Collier County Humane Society. Councilor and the two passengers, Shawn Michael King and an unidentified second passenger, perished in the crash. Witnesses stated that they could hear the engine of the plane cutting out, while some stated that they saw the propeller of the plane stopped, which caused the plane to take a sudden and uncontrolled nose-low descent and make subsequent contact with the ground.

The investigation into the case concluded that the crash was likely the result of the pilot's failure to maintain air speed whilst maneuvering to land after the engine ceased operating, which resulted in the plane stalling, then taking an uncontrolled descent. They were not able to determine what caused the engine to fail. Toxicology reports also indicated that Councilor had diphenhydramine in his urine and blood.

== Motorsports career results ==
=== ARCA Re/Max Series ===
(key) (Bold – Pole position awarded by qualifying time. Italics – Pole position earned by points standings or practice time. * – Most laps led. ** – All laps led.)

ARCA Re/Max Series results
Year	Team	No.	Make	1	2	3	4	5	6	7	8	9	10	11	12	13	14	15	16	17	18	19	20	21	22	23	24	25	ARMSC	Pts	Ref
1997	Cavin Councilor	95	Ford	DAY	ATL	SLM	CLT	CLT	POC	MCH	SBS	TOL	KIL	FRS	MIN	POC	MCH; 30	DSF	GTW	SLM	WIN	CLT	TAL; 14	ISF	ATL				N/A	0	
1998	Cavin Councilor	19	Chevy	DAY; Wth	ATL; 28	SLM; 7	CLT; 20	MEM; 33			SBS; 27	TOL	PPR; 17					ATL; 29	DSF	SLM; 12	TEX; DNQ	WIN; 7	CLT; 33	TAL; DNQ	ATL; 30				17th	2070	
1998	Cavin Councilor	19	Ford						MCH; 40	POC				POC; 27	KIL; 7	FRS; 10	ISF												17th	2070	
1999	Cavin Councilor	19	Chevy	DAY; 25	ATL; 8	SLM; 16	AND; 27	CLT; 22	MCH; 16	POC; 15	TOL; 17	SBS; 18	BLN; 7	POC; 19	KIL; 7	FRS; 17	FLM; 14	ISF; 19	WIN; 5	DSF; 33	SLM; 13	CLT; 29	TAL; 15	ATL; 30					9th	4250	
2000	Cavin Councilor	19	Chevy	DAY; 15	SLM; 15	AND; 27	CLT; 18	KIL; 23	FRS; 16	MCH; 19	POC; 35	TOL; 17	KEN; 9	BLN; 9	POC; 31	WIN; 12	ISF; 15	KEN	DSF; 26	SLM; 13	CLT; 38	TAL; 34	ATL						13th	2785	
2001	Cavin Councilor	19	Chevy	DAY	NSH; 29	WIN	SLM	GTY	KEN	CLT	KAN	MCH	POC	MEM; 13	GLN	KEN	MCH	POC	NSH	ISF	CHI	DSF	SLM	TOL	BLN	CLT	TAL	ATL	166th	85	
