= Alabama Gang =

Former NASCAR-related nickname

The Alabama Gang was the nickname for a group of NASCAR drivers (and subsequently their offspring) who set up shop and operated out of Hueytown, Alabama (near Birmingham). In the late 1950s, young auto racer Bobby Allison left Miami, Florida, looking for an area that had more opportunities to race. He discovered central Alabama in his travels. The region was dotted with small dirt tracks, and Allison won big his first few times out. He returned to Florida to pick up his brother Donnie Allison, and friend Red Farmer.

The trio set up shop in Hueytown, Alabama, and were dominant throughout the 1960s and early 1970s. In 1973, Jimmy Means joined the gang. Beginning in 1979, their sons and contemporaries began racing, and became known as members of the Alabama Gang themselves. Bobby's son Davey Allison, and fellow Hueytown residents Neil Bonnett, and David Bonnett. Donnie's daughter Pam married Hut Stricklin, who joined this generation.

Other drivers (notably Dale Earnhardt) were great friends with members of this group, and while not Alabama residents, these other drivers became associated with the Alabama Gang.

All of the original members of the Alabama Gang have been inducted into the International Motorsports Hall of Fame. Davey Allison's little brother, Clifford Allison, followed the Alabama Gang tradition, but while practicing for a Busch Series race at Michigan International Speedway in 1992, he spun out in turn 4 and was killed. Davey Allison died in a helicopter crash at Talladega Superspeedway in 1993 while flying to observe a practice session for David Bonnett (Neil's son). Then Neil Bonnett died while practicing for the 1994 Daytona 500. Bobby Allison retired in 1988 after suffering injuries in a race at the Miller High Life 500 in June 1988 at Pocono Raceway that nearly cost him his life, but returned in 1993 to race in a Jaguar as part of ESPN's "Fast Masters" held at Lucas Oil Raceway. Farmer, born October 15, 1932, is the oldest member of the "Gang". His first race was in 1948. He was injured in the helicopter crash that took Davey Allison's life, but recovered and still at 92, races regularly at the Talladega Short Track across the street from Talladega Superspeedway. (2024)

In February 1988, two Gang members Neil Bonnett and Bobby Allison, traveled to Melbourne, Australia for the first ever NASCAR race held outside of North America held at the Calder Park Thunderdome. Bonnett and Allison qualified on the front row and dominated the 280 lap race known as the Goodyear NASCAR 500. Bonnett won the race by just 0.86 seconds from Allison.

The third generation of the Alabama Gang has continued the legacy. Donnie's grandsons Taylor Stricklin (son of Pam) and ARCA driver Justin Allison (son of Kenny) have scored wins with Justin Allison winning the ARCA ModSpace 125 at Pocono Raceway and Taylor winning a Limited Late Model title at Hickory Motor Speedway. Neil's grandson Justin Bonnett (son of David) has also raced Late Models and Modifieds in the Alabama and Florida panhandle region.

Hueytown memorialized the racers by renaming its main street Allison-Bonnett Memorial Drive. There are other tributes to the "Gang" around the city. Other streets bear names of the members, including Davey Allison Boulevard and Red Farmer Drive, and certain local businesses also have paid tribute to the famous drivers. A Honda automobile dealership located in Hueytown was named Neil Bonnett Honda for many years, but it was renamed Serra Honda in 2006. Additionally, the Seal of the City of Hueytown features two checkered flags, acknowledging the large part racing has played in the city's history. On April 30, 2014, Talladega Superspeedway renamed the back straightaway The Alabama Gang Superstretch.
