= Peter Daniels (racing driver) =

American racing driver

Peter Daniels (born June 24, 1958) is an American racing driver who won the NASCAR Weekly Series national championship in 2002.

In 2002, driving an asphalt Modified owned by his brother Richard Daniels, Peter won 14 of the 18 races that he entered at Claremont Speedway (now named Twin State Speedway) in New Hampshire.

Daniels won Claremont's Pro Stock division championships in 1993, 1994, 1996, 1998, and 1999. He won the same track's Modified championships in 1999, 2001, and 2002.

Daniels raced two races in the Busch Series in 1991 (combined race with Busch North Series) and 21 events in the Busch North Series from 1991 through 1993.
