= Tim Bender =

American racing driver (born 1957)

- Born: August 19, 1957 (age 69); Colden, New York, U.S.
- Achievements: 4-time Formula III winner at World Championship Snowmobile Derby (1985–1988)

NASCAR O'Reilly Auto Parts Series career
- 19 races run over 7 years
- Best finish: 49th (1997)
- First race: 1990 AC-Delco 200 (Rockingham)
- Last race: 1997 Coca-Cola 300 (Texas)
Wins	Top tens	Poles
0	0	1

Tim Bender (born August 19, 1957) is an American former snowmobile and NASCAR Busch Series race car driver from Colden, New York. He raced snowmobiles in the 1970s to 1990s and was inducted in the Snowmobile Hall of Fame. He had spot starts in the Busch Series from 1990 to 1996. He joined the tour full-time in 1997 before suffering a career-ending injury after the eighth race.

== Snowmobile racing ==
=== Career ===
Bender began racing snowmobiles in 1974. He raced on ovals and snocross, peaking in the modified classes at United States Snowmobile Association (USSA) and Ontario Snowmobile Racing Federation (OSRF) events. Some of Bender's big wins were a championship at the Kawartha Cup in 1985 and two Formula I wins at the Adirondack Cup racing in 1990-91. He swept the Formula III division at the World Championship Snowmobile Derby at Eagle River from 1985 to 1988. In 1999 he was inducted into the Snowmobile Hall of Fame. During his snowmobile racing career, Bender was known for his association with Yamaha; he won a total of eleven snowmobiling championships. In the 1980s, he designed several limited-production racing sleds that he used in competition.

=== Other snowmobile activities ===
Bender formed and ran Bender Racing, a snowmobile performance parts company. He sold the company in 1997 to go NASCAR racing and the company continues to carry his name. As of 2011, he was the Team Manager for the Hentges Racing Polaris team. As of 2014, Bender is on the Board of Directors for the Snowmobile Hill Climb Racing Association (SHCRA).

== Stock car racing ==
Bender raced selected events on the Busch North Series tour between 1988 and 1991 with one top-ten finish. He raced in selected NASCAR Sportsman Division events from 1990 until 1996. He began racing full-time for the newly retired Robbie Reiser in 1997. Bender won his only career NASCAR pole position of 179.835 miles per hour (289.416 km/h) at the Stihl Outdoor Power Tools 300 (Atlanta Motor Speedway). He suffered a career-ending neck injury in qualifying for the season's ninth race at Bristol Motor Speedway. Reiser selected Matt Kenseth to replace Bender, and the team would go on to finish second in the following season's Busch Series championship.
