= Robert Powell (racing driver) =

American racing driver

Bobby "Robert" Powell (born June 16, 1965) is an American racing driver who won the NASCAR Weekly Series national championship in 1988. He competed in fifteen NASCAR Busch Series (now Xfinity Series) races spread throughout the 1980s and 1990s.

== Driving career ==
Driving an asphalt Late Model that he owned, Powell won 23 of the 31 NASCAR-sanctioned races that he entered at race tracks in Summerville, Myrtle Beach, and Anderson (all in South Carolina).

Powell raced in the NASCAR Busch Series in the 1980s and 1990s. He scattered fifteen starts with 1989 being the season where he had more than one start. His best career result was a fourth-place finish at Lanier National Speedway; his others top-ten finishes were an eighth at Myrtle Beach Speedway, a tenth at South Boston Speedway and a tenth at Hickory Motor Speedway.

Powell ran 32 races in the NASCAR Southeast Series, with five top-fives, thirteen top-tens and three pole-positions.

Powell also ran one USAR Hooters Pro Cup Series race in 2000, he finished seventh and led twenty laps.

== Arrest ==
Powell was arrested in December 2014 in Goose Creek, SC for manufacturing methamphetamine. Many materials for the manufacture of methamphetamine were found in his garbage can.
