= Myrtle Beach 250 =

NASCAR Busch Series
- Venue: Myrtle Beach Speedway
- First race: 1988
- Last race: 2000
- Distance: 134.5 miles (216.5 km)
- Laps: 250
- Previous names: Myrtle Beach 200 (1988); Carolina Pride / Budweiser 200 (1989–1990); Carolina Pride / Budweiser 250 (1991–1994); Carolina Pride / Red Dog 250 (1995); Carolina Pride / Advance Auto Parts 250 (1996); Advance Auto Parts 250 (1997); Myrtle Beach 250 (1998–2000)

The Myrtle Beach 250 was a NASCAR Busch Series stock car race held at Myrtle Beach Speedway, in Myrtle Beach, South Carolina. Added to the Busch Series schedule in 1988, Myrtle Beach Speedway hosted one race per year through the 2000 season, after which it was removed from the schedule. The first three races held were 200 laps, covering 107.6 miles (173.2 km). The distance was extended to 250 laps starting in 1991, where it remained for the rest of the race's history. Jimmy Spencer and Jeff Green were the only drivers to win twice in this race. Spencer won at both the 200 and 250 laps race lengths, while Green won the final two races ever held at Myrtle Beach.

Two other short tracks, Nashville Speedway USA and South Boston Speedway, were also removed from the Busch Series schedule after the 2000 season. This extra room created on the schedule was used to help add new races at Chicagoland Speedway, Kansas Speedway, Nashville Superspeedway, and Kentucky Speedway starting in 2001.

== Past winners ==
Year	Date	No.	Driver	Team	Manufacturer	Race Distance		Race Time	Average Speed (mph)	Report	Ref
Year	Date	No.	Driver	Team	Manufacturer	Laps	Miles (km)	Race Time	Average Speed (mph)	Report	Ref
1988	July 2	25	Rob Moroso	Dick Moroso	Oldsmobile	200	107.6 (173.165)	1:36:04	66.971	Report	
1989	July 4	34	Jimmy Spencer	Team 34	Buick	200	107.6 (173.165)	1:25:01	75.938	Report	
1990	June 30	1	Mark Martin	Bill Davis Racing	Ford	200	107.6 (173.165)	1:24:52	76.072	Report	
1991	June 22	63	Chuck Bown	HMV Motorsports	Pontiac	250	134.5 (216.456)	1:49:15	73.867	Report	
1992	June 20	20	Jimmy Spencer	Dick Moroso	Oldsmobile	250	134.5 (216.456)	2:21:14	57.139	Report	
1993	June 12	8	Jeff Burton	FILMAR Racing	Ford	250	134.5 (216.456)	1:56:59	68.984	Report	
1994	June 11	38	Elton Sawyer	Akins-Sutton Motorsports	Ford	250	134.5 (216.456)	2:01:18	66.529	Report	
1995	June 10	92	Larry Pearson	Martin Racing	Chevrolet	250	134.5 (216.456)	1:41:23	79.599	Report	
1996	June 22	95	David Green	American Equipment Racing	Chevrolet	250	134.5 (216.456)	1:53:35	71.049	Report	
1997	July 12	29	Elliott Sadler	Diamond Ridge Motorsports	Chevrolet	250	134.5 (216.456)	1:39:07	81.419	Report	
1998	July 11	74	Randy LaJoie	BACE Motorsports	Chevrolet	250	134.5 (216.456)	1:36:56	80.754	Report	
1999	July 17	32	Jeff Green	Progressive Motorsports	Chevrolet	250	134.5 (216.456)	1:35:52	84.179	Report	
2000	June 17	10	Jeff Green	ppc Racing	Chevrolet	250	134.5 (216.456)	1:56:17	69.399	Report	
