= Keelan Harvick =

American racing driver

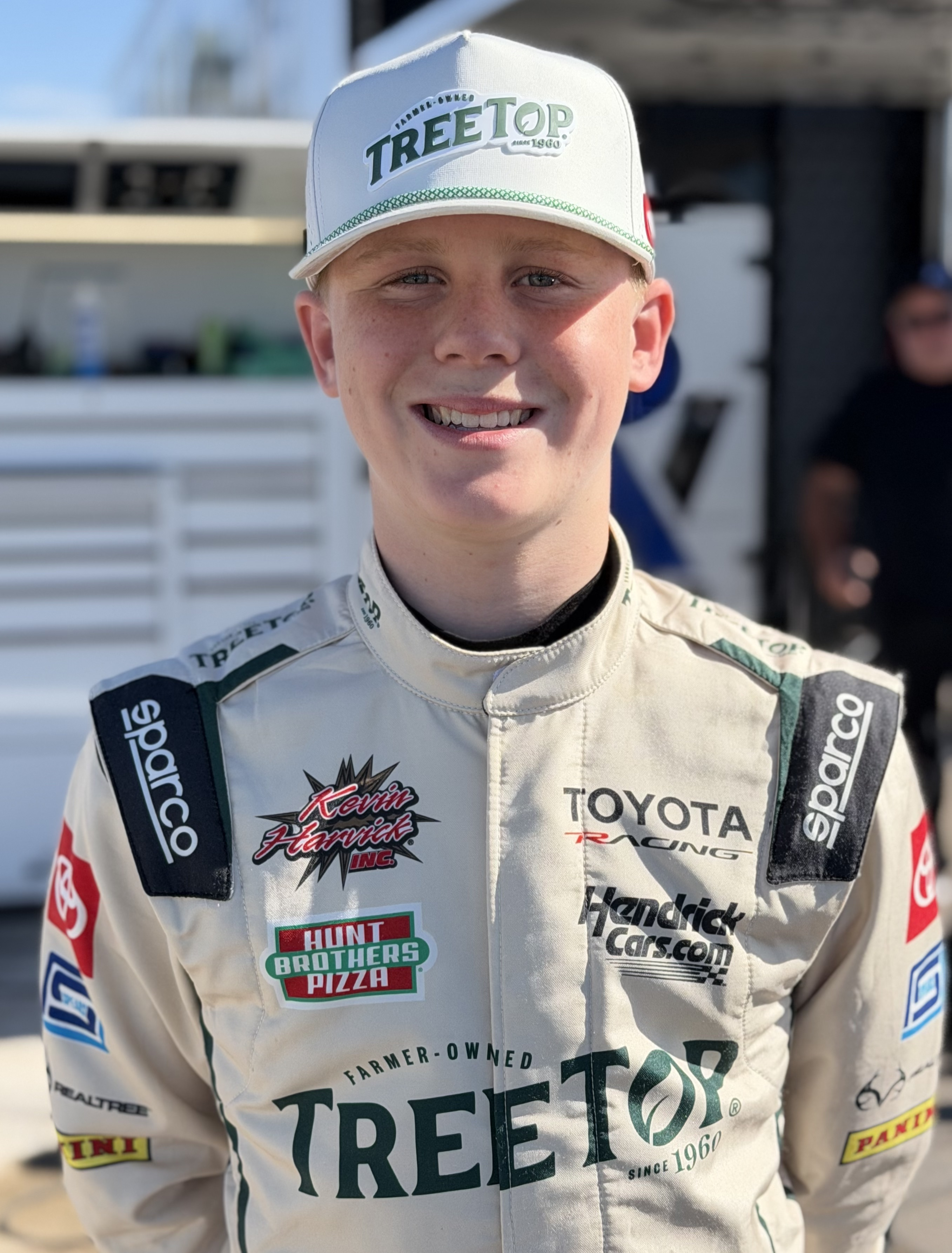
- Harvick at the Las Vegas Motor Speedway Bullring in 2026
- Born: Keelan Paul Harvick; July 8, 2012 (age 14) Charlotte, North Carolina, U.S.

CARS Pro Late Model Tour career
- Debut season: 2025
- Years active: 2025–present
- Starts: 14
- Championships: 0
- Wins: 4
- Poles: 3
- Best finish: 4th in 2025

Awards
- 2025 CARS Pro Late Model Tour Most Popular Driver
- Statistics up to date as of September 8, 2026.

Keelan Paul Harvick (born July 8, 2012) is an American professional stock car racing driver. He currently competes in various Late Model and Pro Late Model series such as the zMAX CARS Tour and the ASA STARS National Tour, driving the No. 62 Toyota for Rackley W.A.R. and Kevin Harvick Incorporated. He is the son of former NASCAR Cup Series champion Kevin Harvick.

Harvick has also competed in series such as the CARS Tour West Pro Late Model Series, CRA JEGS All-Stars Tour, the INEX Summer Shootout, and the NASCAR Local Racing Series.

== Early career ==
Harvick first started racing in go-karts, and got his first win at the age of eight at the GoPro Motorplex in Mooresville, North Carolina in 2020.

In 2021, Harvick participated in an eNASCAR iRacing Pro Invitational Series race with father Kevin.

== Racing career ==
=== Legends cars ===
In 2023, Harvick switched to legends cars, where he competed in events like the INEX Summer Shootout at Charlotte Motor Speedway.

In 2024, Harvick continued to race in legends cars, where he won a total of 27 races in 49 starts across Summer Shootout, INEX Nashville Spring Series and INEX Winter Nationals, which culminated in him winning the INEX Young Lions Asphalt National Championship.

=== Late Model racing ===
Harvick made his first start in a Late Model in 2024, where he competed in the South Carolina 400 at Florence Motor Speedway.

In 2025, Harvick made the switch to Pro Late Models, where he would drive for Rackley W.A.R. in collaboration with Kevin Harvick Incorporated. In May, he got his first Late Model win in the CARS Tour West race at Kevin Harvick's Kern Raceway. Two months later, Harvick would get his first win in the CARS Pro Late Model Tour at Hickory Motor Speedway. He would go on to win one more race in the CARS Tout West at Colorado National Speedway, and three more races in the Pro Late Model Tour at Florence Motor Speedway, South Boston Speedway, and North Wilkesboro Speedway. In the PLM Tour, he finished fourth in the points despite running only ten races, and won the Most Popular Driver award in that division. Later in the year, he competed in the Thanksgiving Classic at Southern National Motorsports Park, where he finished in 19th, as well as the Snowflake 125 at Five Flags Speedway, where he became the youngest winner in event history, surpassing the record set by Hunter Robbins in 2005.

In 2026, it was announced that Harvick had been signed to Toyota as a development driver. He would continue to run in Pro Late Models, including running the Icebreaker a Florence Motor Speedway, where he became the youngest winner in event history, as well as making starts in the ASA National Tour, where he became the youngest winner in series history at Owosso Speedway, breaking the record previously set by Gio Ruggiero in 2023. He also made his debut in the CARS Late Model Stock Tour at Anderson Speedway, where he finished in eighth.

== Personal life ==
Harvick's father, Kevin, is a former NASCAR Cup Series champion who competed full-time from 2001 to 2023. He is also the son of KHI co-owner DeLana Harvick. His maternal grandfather was John Linville, who also competed in NASCAR racing.

== Motorsports results ==
=== Stock car career summary ===
Season	Series	Team	Races	Wins	Top 5	Top 10	Points	Position
2025	CARS Pro Late Model Tour	Kevin Harvick Incorporated	10	4	6	8	402	4th
2026	ASA STARS National Tour	Kevin Harvick Incorporated	3	1	1	2	212*	15th*
2026	CARS Pro Late Model Tour	Kevin Harvick Incorporated	4	0	2	4	150	17th
2026	CARS Late Model Stock Car Tour	Kevin Harvick Incorporated	5	0	1	3	166	22nd

=== CARS Late Model Stock Car Tour ===
(key) (Bold – Pole position awarded by qualifying time. Italics – Pole position earned by points standings or practice time. * – Most laps led. ** – All laps led.)

CARS Late Model Stock Car Tour results
Year	Team	No.	Make	1	2	3	4	5	6	7	8	9	10	11	12	13	14	CLMSCTC	Pts	Ref
2026	Kevin Harvick Incorporated	62	Toyota	SNM	WCS	NSV	CRW	ACE	LGY	DOM	NWS	HCY	AND; 8	FLC; 11	TCM; 11	NPS; 4	SBO; 10	22nd	166	

=== CARS Pro Late Model Tour ===
(key)

CARS Pro Late Model Tour results
Year	Team	No.	Make	1	2	3	4	5	6	7	8	9	10	11	12	13	CPLMTC	Pts	Ref
2025	Kevin Harvick Incorporated	62	Chevy	AAS; Wth	**CDL**; 5*	OCS; 6	ACE; 7	NWS; 3	CRW; 11	**HCY**; 1**				SBO; 1*	TCM	NWS; 1	4th	402	
2025	Kevin Harvick Incorporated	32	Chevy								HCY; 17	AND					4th	402	
2025	Kevin Harvick Incorporated	62H	Chevy										**FLC**; 1				4th	402	
2026	Kevin Harvick Incorporated	62	Toyota	SNM; 2*	NSV	CRW	ACE; 5	NWS; 7									17th	150	
2026	Kevin Harvick Incorporated	75	Toyota						HCY; 7	AND	FLC	TCM	NPS	SBO			17th	150	

=== ASA STARS National Tour ===
(key) (Bold – Pole position awarded by qualifying time. Italics – Pole position earned by points standings or practice time. * – Most laps led. ** – All laps led.)

ASA STARS National Tour results
Year	Team	No.	Make	1	2	3	4	5	6	7	8	9	10	11	ASNTC	Pts	Ref
2026	Kevin Harvick Incorporated	62	Toyota	NSM	FIF	HCY	SLG	MAD	NPS; 10	**OWO**; 1*	**TRI**; 21	WIN	NSV	NSM	-*	-*	
