= 2011 Food City 250 =

NASCAR Nationwide Series race

Race details
- Race 25 of 34 in the 2011 NASCAR Nationwide Series season
- Date: August 26, 2011
- Location: Bristol Motor Speedway, Bristol, Tennessee
- Course: Permanent racing facility
- Course length: 0.533 miles (0.858 km)
- Distance: 250 laps, 133.25 mi (214.445 km)
- Weather: Temperatures up to 84.9 °F (29.4 °C): wind speeds up to 5.87 mph (9.45 km/h)
- Average speed: 93.218 mph (150.020 km/h)
- Attendance: 108,000

Pole position
Driver	Kyle Busch	Joe Gibbs Racing
- Time: 15.979

Most laps led
Driver	Kyle Busch	Joe Gibbs Racing
- Laps: 186

Winner
No. 18	Kyle Busch	Joe Gibbs Racing

Television in the United States
- Network: ESPN
- Announcers: Marty Reid, Dale Jarrett, Andy Petree

The 2011 Food City 250 was the 25th stock car race of the 2011 NASCAR Nationwide Series. It was held on August 26, 2011, at Bristol Motor Speedway, in Bristol, Tennessee, before a crowd of 108,000 spectators. Kyle Busch of the Joe Gibbs Racing team won the 250-lap race from the pole position. His teammate Joey Logano finished in second, and Kevin Harvick Incorporated driver Clint Bowyer was third.

Busch won the pole position by posting the fastest lap in qualifying, and held the lead for the opening 112 laps until he was passed by Bowyer on the 113th lap. Busch retook the lead at the start on the 163rd lap. He maintained the first position for the next 24 laps, with Bowyer retaking the lead on lap 187. Two laps later, Busch overtook Bowyer to reclaim the lead. Logano was the leader at the final restart on lap 198. On the 206th lap, Busch got ahead of his teammate Logano to advance back into first. Over the final 34 laps, Logano tried to get by his teammate Busch, but he was unsuccessful, as Busch held him off to win by 0.019 seconds, the closest finish in a Nationwide Series race at Bristol Motor Speedway.

The win was Busch's third consecutive at Bristol Motor Speedway (the first time in Nationwide Series history), his 12th at the track, and the 50th of his career in the division, breaking Mark Martin's record of most series wins he held since 1997. Ricky Stenhouse Jr. maintained the lead in the Drivers' Championship, with Elliott Sadler reducing his advantage to five points. Joe Gibbs's No. 18 team increased their advantage over the No. 60 team of Jack Roush at the top of the Owners' Championship, while Toyota moved past Ford to lead the Manufacturers' Championship with nine races left in the season.

== Background ==
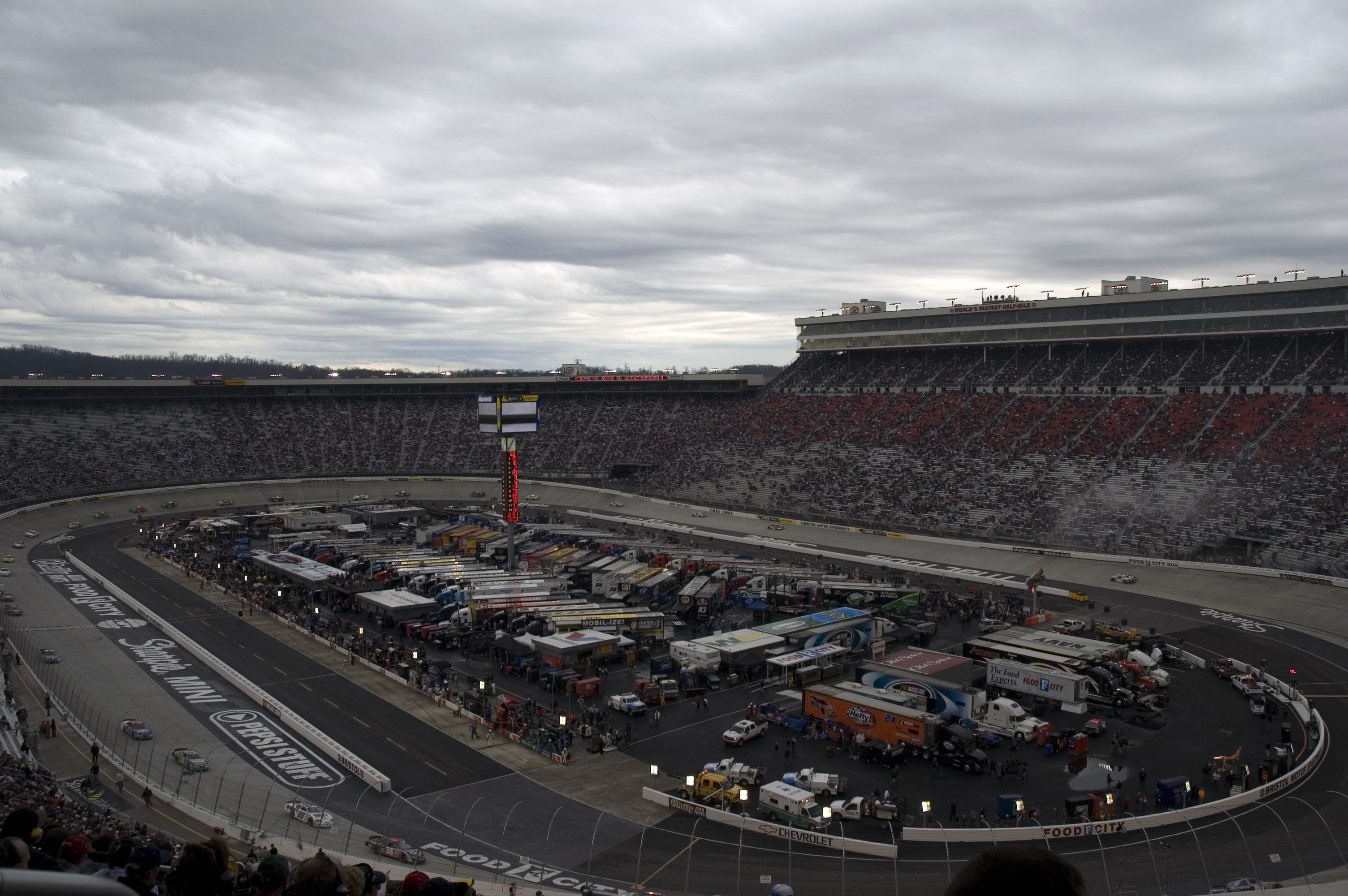
Bristol Motor Speedway, the race track where the race was held.

The 2011 Food City 250 was the 25th of 34 scheduled stock car races of the 2011 NASCAR Nationwide Series. It was held on August 26, 2011, in Bristol, Tennessee, at Bristol Motor Speedway, a short track that holds NASCAR races. The standard track is a four-turn 0.533-mile (0.858-kilometre) short oval. The track's turns are banked from 24 to 30 degrees, while both the front stretch (the location of the finish line) and the back stretch is banked from six to ten degrees.

Before the race Ricky Stenhouse Jr. led the Drivers' Championship with 834 points, with Elliott Sadler eight points behind in the second position. Reed Sorenson was in third with 825 points, Justin Allgaier was fourth with 772 points and Aric Almirola stood in fifth on 770 points. Jason Leffler, Kenny Wallace, Steve Wallace, Brian Scott and Michael Annett rounded out the top ten. Joe Gibbs, owner of the No. 18 car, led the Owners' Championship with 912 points. Jack Roush's No. 60 team followed in second with 870 points, while Sandra Turner's No. 32, DeLana Harvick's No. 33, and Roush's No. 6 team completed the top five. Ford led the Manufacturers' Championship with 142 points; Toyota, Chevrolet, and Dodge followed with 141, 134, and 110 points, respectively. Kyle Busch was the race's defending champion.

There was one driver change heading into the race. Penske Racing announced that Camping World Truck Series driver Parker Kligerman would drive the No. 22 car in place of Brad Keselowski who was recovering from an ankle fracture and a strained back that he sustained in a testing crash at Road Atlanta in early August 2011. It was later disclosed that Penske driver Kurt Busch declined an offer to fill in for Keselowski because he wanted to focus on challenging for the Sprint Cup Series championship.

== Practice and qualification ==
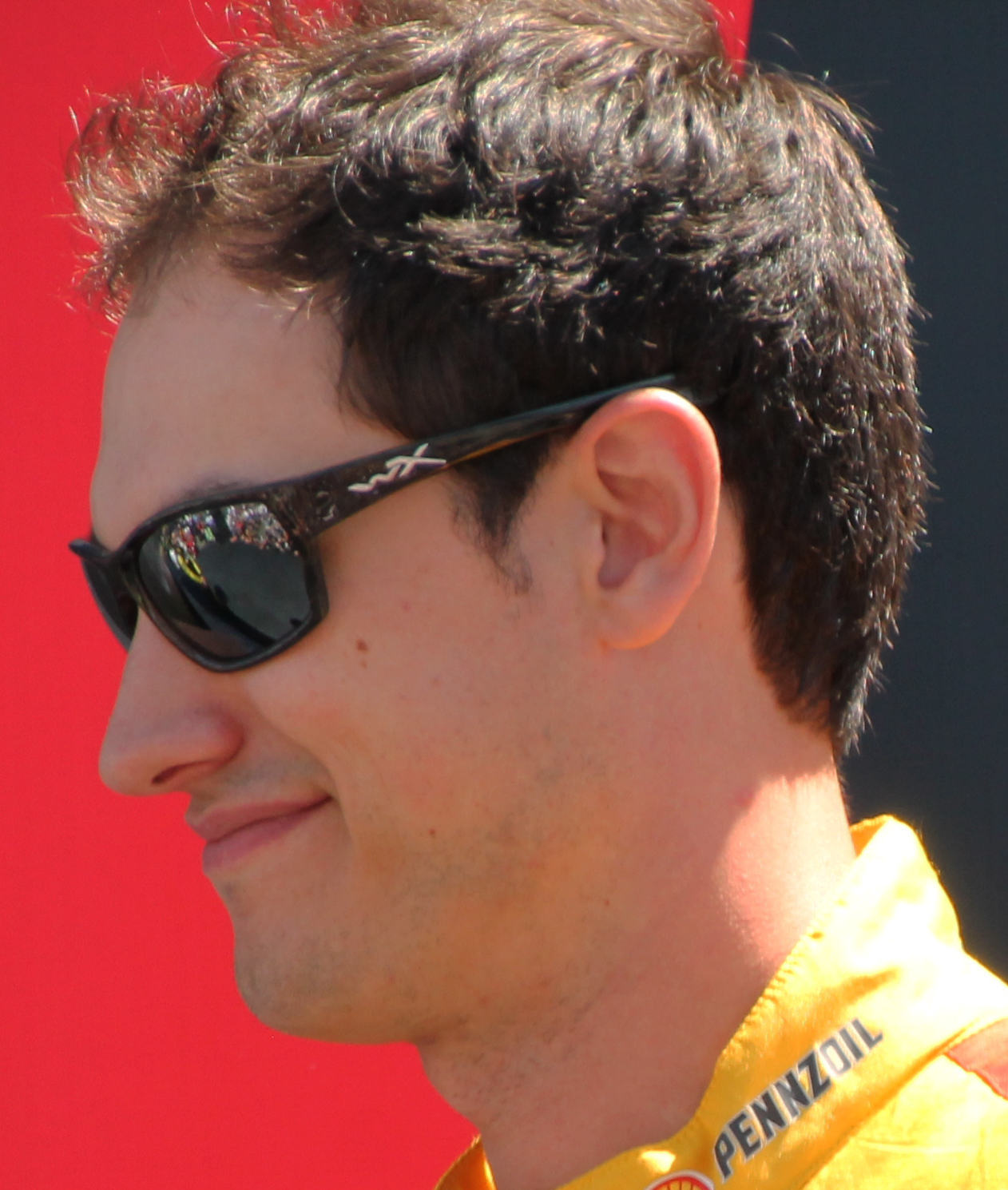
Joey Logano (pictured in 2015) qualified on the front row of the grid in second.

One 120 minute practice session was held on the morning of August 26. With a time of 16.02 seconds, Sadler was the fastest driver in the sole practice session, ahead of Kenny Wallace in second, and Trevor Bayne in third. Leffler was fourth-fastest, Busch came fifth, and Joey Logano placed sixth. Carl Edwards was seventh-quickest, Steve Wallace eighth, Mike Bliss ninth, and Kasey Kahne tenth. During practice, T. J. Bell accidentally reversed on the pit road, and ran over the pelvis of his team's crew chief Cory Howe, who sustained a cut to his head. Howe was conscious when he was airlifted to Wellmont Health System in Kingsport, Tennessee for treatment to his injuries. Tests for any severe injuries to Howe were negative.

A total of 49 cars attempted to qualify for the event on Friday afternoon; according to NASCAR's qualifying procedure forty-three were allowed to race. Each driver ran two laps, with the starting order determined by the competitor's fastest lap times. Busch took his second Nationwide Series pole position at Bristol Motor Speedway, and the 23rd of his career, with a lap of 15.979 seconds. He was joined on the grid's front row by Logano, his Joe Gibbs Racing teammate, who recorded a time that was 0.018 seconds slower. Sadler qualified in the third position, Kenny Wallace took fourth, and Leffer started from fifth place. Edwards, Bayne, Allgaier, Clint Bowyer, and Stenhouse completed the top ten qualifiers. Johnny Chapman, John Jackson, J. J. Yeley, Bell, Jennifer Jo Cobb, and Carl Long were the six drivers who failed to qualify.

=== Qualifying results ===
Qualifying results
Grid	No.	Driver	Team	Manufacturer	Time	Speed
1	18	Kyle Busch	Joe Gibbs Racing	Toyota	15.979	120.083
2	20	Joey Logano	Joe Gibbs Racing	Toyota	15.997	119.948
3	2	Elliott Sadler	Kevin Harvick Incorporated	Chevrolet	16.015	119.813
4	09	Kenny Wallace	RAB Racing	Toyota	16.067	119.425
5	30	Jason Leffler	Turner Motorsports	Chevrolet	16.095	119.217
6	60	Carl Edwards	Roush Fenway Racing	Ford	16.106	119.136
7	16	Trevor Bayne	Roush Fenway Racing	Ford	16.114	119.077
8	31	Justin Allgaier	Turner Motorsports	Chevrolet	16.155	118.774
9	33	Clint Bowyer	Kevin Harvick Incorporated	Chevrolet	16.161	118.730
10	6	Ricky Stenhouse Jr.	Roush Fenway Racing	Ford	16.170	118.664
11	11	Brian Scott	Joe Gibbs Racing	Toyota	16.170	118.664
12	22	Parker Kligerman	Penske Racing	Dodge	16.185	118.554
13	70	David Stremme	ML Motorsports	Chevrolet	16.199	118.452
14	64	David Reutimann	Rusty Wallace Racing	Toyota	16.210	118.371
15	66	Steve Wallace	Rusty Wallace Racing	Toyota	16.232	118.211
16	88	Aric Almirola	JR Motorsports	Chevrolet	16.235	118.189
17	38	Kasey Kahne	Turner Motorsports	Chevrolet	16.237	118.174
18	32	Reed Sorenson	Turner Motorsports	Chevrolet	16.245	118.116
19	7	Josh Wise	JR Motorsports	Chevrolet	16.293	117.768
20	19	Mike Bliss	TriStar Motorsports	Chevrolet	16.304	117.689
21	62	Michael Annett	Rusty Wallace Racing	Toyota	16.345	117.394
22	97	Joe Nemechek	NEMCO Motorsports	Toyota	16.438	116.729
23	03	Scott Riggs	R3 Motorsports	Chevrolet	16.461	116.566
24	05	David Starr	Day Enterprises Motorsports	Chevrolet	16.466	116.531
25	51	Jeremy Clements	Jeremy Clements Racing	Chevrolet	16.494	116.333
26	04	Benny Gordon	Go Green Racing	Ford	16.500	116.291
27	49	Mark Green	Jay Robinson Racing	Chevrolet	16.528	116.094
28	42	Tim Andrews	Key Motorsports	Chevrolet	16.530	116.080
29	46	Chase Miller	Key Motorsports	Chevrolet	16.533	116.059
30	15	Timmy Hill	Rick Ware Racing	Ford	16.539	116.017
31	71	Matt Carter	Rick Ware Racing	Ford	16.548	115.954
32	23	Dennis Setzer	Jay Robinson Racing	Chevrolet	16.589	115.667
33	28	Derrike Cope	Jay Robinson Racing	Chevrolet	16.611	115.514
34	87	Kevin Conway	NEMCO Motorsports	Toyota	16.625	115.416
35	47	Brian Keselowski	Key Motorsports	Chevrolet	16.633	115.361
36	14	Eric McClure	TriStar Motorsports	Chevrolet	16.657	115.195
37	40	Scott Wimmer	Key Motorsports	Chevrolet	16.671	115.098
38	89	Morgan Shepherd	Faith Motorsports	Chevrolet	16.673	115.084
39	01	Mike Wallace	JD Motorsports	Chevrolet	16.676	115.064
40	81	Blake Koch	MacDonald Motorsports	Dodge	16.735	114.658
41	39	Fain Skinner	Go Green Racing	Ford	16.843	113.923
42	52	Kevin Lepage	Means Motorsports	Chevrolet	17.177	111.707
43	44	Jeff Green	TriStar Motorsports	Chevrolet	16.651	115.236
Failed to qualify
44	41	Johnny Chapman	Rick Ware Racing	Chevrolet	16.665	115.140
45	74	J. J. Yeley	Mike Harmon Racing	Chevrolet	16.877	113.693
46	72	John Jackson	John Carter Racing	Toyota	16.927	113.357
47	50	T. J. Bell	MAKE Motorsports	Chevrolet	16.970	113.070
48	13	Jennifer Jo Cobb	JJC Racing	Dodge	17.310	110.849
49	75	Carl Long	Rick Ware Racing	Ford	17.709	108.352

== Race ==
Live television coverage began at 7:30 p.m. Eastern Daylight Time (UTC−04:00) in the United States on ESPN. Around the start of the race, rain fell on the track, but it later dissipated. Mike Rife, senior minister of Vansant Church of Christ, began pre-race ceremonies with an invocation. Country music singer JT Hodges performed the national anthem, and Sullivan County Deputy Sheriff Carolyn Gudger commanded the drivers to start their engines. No driver moved to the back of the grid during the pace laps.

The race began at 7:46 p.m. local time. Busch maintained the lead from his teammate Logano on the first lap. On lap four, Bowyer attempted to get between two Roush Fenway Racing cars, and ran into the rear of Stenhouse's car exiting turn four. By the ninth lap, Logano was 1.3 seconds adrift of race leader Busch. Sadler began battling Kenny Wallace for third on lap 13, and got ahead of him seven laps later. The first caution was waved on lap 35, as David Reutimann was hit from behind by Kahne, sending him spinning in the fourth turn, and reducing Busch's lead of more than 2.6 seconds to nothing. During the caution, several drivers chose to make pit stops. Busch led at the lap 42 restart, followed by Logano, Bowyer, and Sadler. Around this time, Sadler advanced to second place but Logano retook it on the 47th lap.

By lap 68, Busch moved to around 1.2 seconds ahead of his teammate Logano. Three laps later, Bowyer passed Logano on the inside lane between the third and fourth turns to move into second place. He began closing the gap to Busch while the two were within slower traffic. Bowyer clung onto the rear of Busch on lap 110, and he made a pass for the lead between turns three and four on the 113th lap. Busch then began reporting a tight handling car. On lap 122, Bowyer eased off the accelerator pedal to avoid hitting Sorenson and David Starr in turn four. As the surface of the circuit caused drivers to have difficulties with steering their vehicles, on lap 125, Jeremy Clements' tire failed, grazing the catchfence, and littering debris on the track, necessitating the second caution. Busch made a pit stop under caution on the 127th lap. Bowyer maintained the lead at the lap 132 restart. Four laps later, Kenny Wallace caused a third caution when his tire failed, and he made contact with the barrier between turns three and four.

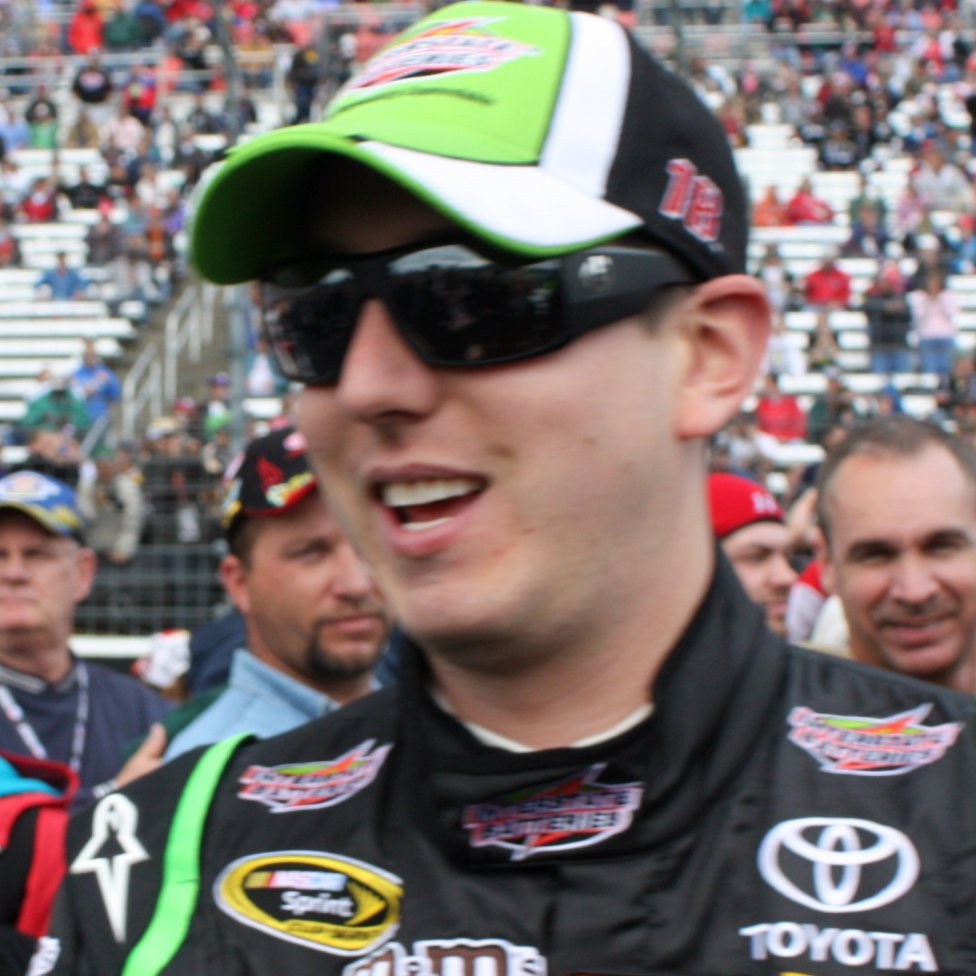
Kyle Busch (pictured in 2010) held off his teammate Logano in the final laps to win his 50th Nationwide Series race, breaking Mark Martin's 1997 record of the most series victories.

The race restarted on lap 141 with Bowyer leading Busch and his teammate Logano. Sadler sought a way past Busch on the 143rd lap but he could not complete the overtake. A fourth caution came out on lap 145, as Kligerman spun 180 degrees up the circuit in turn two while attempting to pass Stenhouse. Bowyer again maintained the first position at the lap 151 restart. That lap, Bayne unsuccessfully attempted to overtake Busch for second. Bayne later fell behind Leffler and Edwards to fourth on the 160th lap. Busch went to the outside to pass Bowyer to retake the lead at the start/finish line to start lap 163. Five laps later, Edwards began battling Leffler for the third position, and the trio of Bayne, Sadler and Almirola were in a duel for sixth place by lap 173. By the 178th lap, Busch and Bowyer pulled away to lead the third-placed Leffler by five seconds.

On lap 185, Bowyer went to the inside of Busch, and passed him for the lead two laps later. He led the next two laps before Busch passed him on lap 189. Two laps later, Starr's tire blew, and the right-hand quarter of his car struck the turn two wall, triggering the fifth (and final) caution. All of the leaders (including Busch) elected to make pit stops during the caution. Green flag racing resumed on the 198th lap with the non-stopping Logano leading. That lap, Busch began challenging his teammate Logano for the lead. Edwards lost fourth to Bowyer on lap 201. Five laps later, Bowyer overtook Leffler for third place. Around the same time, Logano lost the lead to Busch. On the 211th lap, Logano made an unsuccessful attempt to retake the lead from his teammate Busch, as the first three were evenly separated by lap 220.

By the 239th lap, Busch had increased his lead to eight-tenths of a second, though his teammate Logano lowered it to challenge him six laps later. Both were delayed by Joe Nemechek on lap 247 but the two got past him soon after. Busch and Logano were alongside each other during the final two laps, as Busch had an understeer at the right-rear of his car when he steered to the inside. Logano took the lead on the inside, and moved narrowly ahead of Busch leaving the fourth turn. However, Busch had momentum on the outside down the frontstretch to win. It was Busch's third consecutive win at Bristol Motor Speedway (a first in series history), his 12th at the track, and the 50th in the Nationwide Series, breaking Mark Martin's 1997 record of most division victories. The margin of victory was 0.019 seconds, the closest in a Nationwide Series race at Bristol Motor Speedway, and then the seventh closest in NASCAR history since electronic scoring was introduced in 1993. There were six lead changes among three drivers during the race. Busch's 186 laps led was the most of any competitor.

=== Post-race ===
I don't know if it was aero with him being so close to me or just the right rear sliding out from underneath me. The middle was where I could carry the most momentum and run down the straightaways a bit faster than him. I knew if it came down to a race where we would bang each other's doors through (turns) 3 and 4 like we did, that getting back to the gas and coming through turn 4 as hard as you could, taking the momentum from the top side would be the way to do it.

— Kyle Busch on holding off his teammate Logano in the closest Nationwide Series finish in Bristol Motor Speedway history.

Busch appeared in Victory Lane after his victory lap to celebrate his 50th career victory in front of the crowd of 108,000 people; the win earned him $46,575. He said that he was pleased to break Martin's achievement at Bristol Motor Speedway, and felt he was certain the spectators enjoyed his battle with Logano, "There are an awful lot of accomplishments and it's hard to pinpoint where they fall, but tonight is a pretty big one, just being able to race that hard and race against a teammate like that knowing that he had just as good of stuff as I did." Logano stated he was envious about his teammate's win, "I did everything I could possibly do besides wreck him to try to make the pass. But that ain't the right thing to do when he's your teammate. It's frustrating, but what a day for JGR. Coming across the line that close and rubbing doors. That's cool. I just wish that I was the one celebrating right now."

Third-placed Bowyer complemented Busch, "I'm fortunate to be able to work with him every weekend. Just listening to the way he talks about his car and what he looks for, there definitely are a lot of things you can learn from talking to him and watching him race. We want to beat him. It's frustrating to be so close. He's just a really good driver." Busch's crew chief Jason Ratcliff commented that the driver had the potential to win 100 Nationwide Series races, "The first time I met Kyle when he was running the 5 car at Hendrick; he was very, very impressive from the first time I watched him on the race track and had to race against him, So I was really excited when he came over to Gibbs." Edwards, who finished in fourth place, spoke of his disappointment over not winning the event after he was penalized for a pit road transgression, "Man, I really wanted to win this race, We got pushed back with the pit road penalty and that made the night tougher. Then we got all the way back up there and I thought we were going to have a shot there at the end."

The result kept Stenhouse in the lead of the Drivers' Championship with a new total of 867 points. Sadler moved to within five points of him in second, and Sorenson was another five points behind in third. Almirola improved his position to fourth, while Allgaier fell to fifth. Leffler, Kenny Wallace, Steve Wallace, Scott, and Annett rounded out the top ten. Gibbs' No. 18 team also maintained the lead in a much wider Owners' Championship; Edwards' fourth-place finish left Roush's No. 60 team 50 points behind Gibbs, while Turner's No. 32, Harvick's No. 33, and Roush No. 6 squads remained third, fourth, and fifth. Toyota gained the lead in the Manufacturers' Championship with 150 points; Ford, Chevrolet, and Dodge followed with 146, 140, and 114 respective points.

=== Race results ===
Race results
Pos.	Grid	No.	Driver	Team	Manufacturer	Laps	Points
1	1	18	Kyle Busch	Joe Gibbs Racing	Toyota	250	0^{1}
2	2	20	Joey Logano	Joe Gibbs Racing	Toyota	250	0^{1}
3	9	33	Clint Bowyer	Kevin Harvick Incorporated	Chevrolet	250	0^{1}
4	6	60	Carl Edwards	Roush Fenway Racing	Ford	250	0^{1}
5	16	88	Aric Almirola	JR Motorsports	Chevrolet	250	39
6	21	62	Michael Annett	Rusty Wallace Racing	Toyota	250	38
7	5	30	Jason Leffler	Turner Motorsports	Chevrolet	250	37
8	3	2	Elliott Sadler	Kevin Harvick Incorporated	Chevrolet	250	36
9	12	22	Parker Kligerman	Penske Racing	Dodge	250	0^{1}
10	11	11	Brian Scott	Joe Gibbs Racing	Toyota	250	34
11	10	6	Ricky Stenhouse Jr.	Roush Fenway Racing	Ford	250	33
12	18	32	Reed Sorenson	Turner Motorsports	Chevrolet	250	32
13	7	16	Trevor Bayne	Roush Fenway Racing	Ford	250	31
14	15	66	Steve Wallace	Rusty Wallace Racing	Toyota	250	30
15	8	31	Justin Allgaier	Turner Motorsports	Chevrolet	250	29
16	19	7	Josh Wise	JR Motorsports	Chevrolet	249	28
17	13	70	David Stremme	ML Motorsports	Chevrolet	249	0^{1}
18	20	19	Mike Bliss	TriStar Motorsports	Chevrolet	249	26
19	17	36	Kasey Kahne	Turner Motorsports	Chevrolet	248	0^{1}
20	14	84	David Reutimann	Rusty Wallace Racing	Toyota	248	0^{1}
21	22	97	Joe Nemechek	NEMCO Motorsports	Toyota	247	23
22	30	15	Timmy Hill	Rick Ware Racing	Ford	247	22
23	40	81	Blake Koch	MacDonald Motorsports	Dodge	247	21
24	37	40	Scott Wimmer	Key Motorsports	Chevrolet	246	20
25	33	28	Derrike Cope	Jay Robinson Racing	Chevrolet	246	19
26	39	01	Mike Wallace	JD Motorsports	Chevrolet	245	18
27	36	14	Eric McClure	TriStar Motorsports	Chevrolet	245	17
28	26	04	Benny Gordon	Go Green Racing	Ford	244	16
29	34	87	Kevin Conway	NEMCO Motorsports	Toyota	243	15
30	41	39	Fain Skinner	Go Green Racing	Ford	242	14
31	42	52	Kevin Lepage	Means Motorsports	Chevrolet	241	13
32	25	51	Jeremy Clements	Jeremy Clements Racing	Chevrolet	219	12
33	24	05	David Starr	Day Enterprises Motorsports	Chevrolet	187	0^{1}
34	38	89	Morgan Shepherd	Faith Motorsports	Chevrolet	161	10
35	32	23	Dennis Setzer	Jay Robinson Racing	Chevrolet	137	9
36	4	09	Kenny Wallace	RAB Racing	Toyota	136	8
37	23	03	Scott Riggs	R3 Motorsports	Chevrolet	19	7
38	27	49	Mark Green	Jay Robinson Racing	Chevrolet	11	6
39	28	42	Tim Andrews	Key Motorsports	Chevrolet	11	5
40	29	46	Chase Miller	Key Motorsprorts	Chevrolet	7	4
41	31	71	Matt Carter	Rick Ware Racing	Ford	7	3
42	35	47	Brian Keselowski	Key Motorsports	Chevrolet	6	0^{1}
43	43	44	Jeff Green	TriStar Motorsports	Chevrolet	4	1
^{1} Ineligible for championship points

== Standings after the race ==
Drivers' Championship standings
Rank	+/–	Driver	Points
1		Ricky Stenhouse Jr.	867
2		Elliott Sadler	862 (−5)
3		Reed Sorenson	857 (−10)
4	1	Aric Almirola	809 (−58)
5	1	Justin Allgaier	801 (−66)
6		Jason Leffler	776 (−91)
7		Kenny Wallace	722 (−145)
8		Steve Wallace	706 (−161)
9		Brian Scott	692 (−175)
10		Michael Annett	687 (−180)

Owners' Championship standings
Rank	+/–	Owner	No.	Points
1		Joe Gibbs	18	960
2		Jack Roush	60	910 (−50)
3		Sandra Turner	32	886 (−74)
4		DeLana Harvick	33	887 (−83)
5		Jack Roush	6	867 (−93)

Manufacturers' Championship standings
Rank	+/–	Manufacturer	Points
1	1	Toyota	150
2	1	Ford	146 (−4)
3		Chevrolet	140 (−10)
4		Dodge	114 (−36)

- Note: Only the top ten and five positions are included for the driver and owner standings respectively.
