= Kevin Harvick Incorporated =

American stock car racing team

- Owner(s): Kevin Harvick; DeLana Harvick
- Base: Kernersville, North Carolina, United States
- Series: CARS Tour
- Race drivers: CARS Tour; 29. Kevin Harvick; 62. Keelan Harvick
- Manufacturer: Chevrolet; Ford; Toyota
- Opened: 2002 (original)
- Closed: 2011 (original)

Career
- Drivers' Championships: Truck Series: 2007, 2009
- Race victories: Truck Series: 43; Nationwide Series: 10

Kevin Harvick, Inc., colloquially referred to as KHI, is a racing team owned by former NASCAR Cup Series driver Kevin Harvick and his wife DeLana, who is the daughter of former Busch Series driver John Linville. The team owned cars in the NASCAR Nationwide Series, Truck Series, and the ARCA Re/Max Series.

The team's Nationwide Series equipment was originally purchased from the former BACE Motorsports and Andy Petree Racing teams. It was announced in September 2011 that KHI would merge with Richard Childress Racing beginning in 2012, with KHI no longer fielding a vehicle in any of the top three NASCAR divisions. In 2024, the team returned to late model racing in the CARS Tour, fielding the No. 29 late model full-time for Brent Crews and the No. 62 late model full-time for several drivers. KHI also operates as a management agency for athletes, particularly in motorsports.

== Nationwide Series ==
=== Car No. 2 history ===
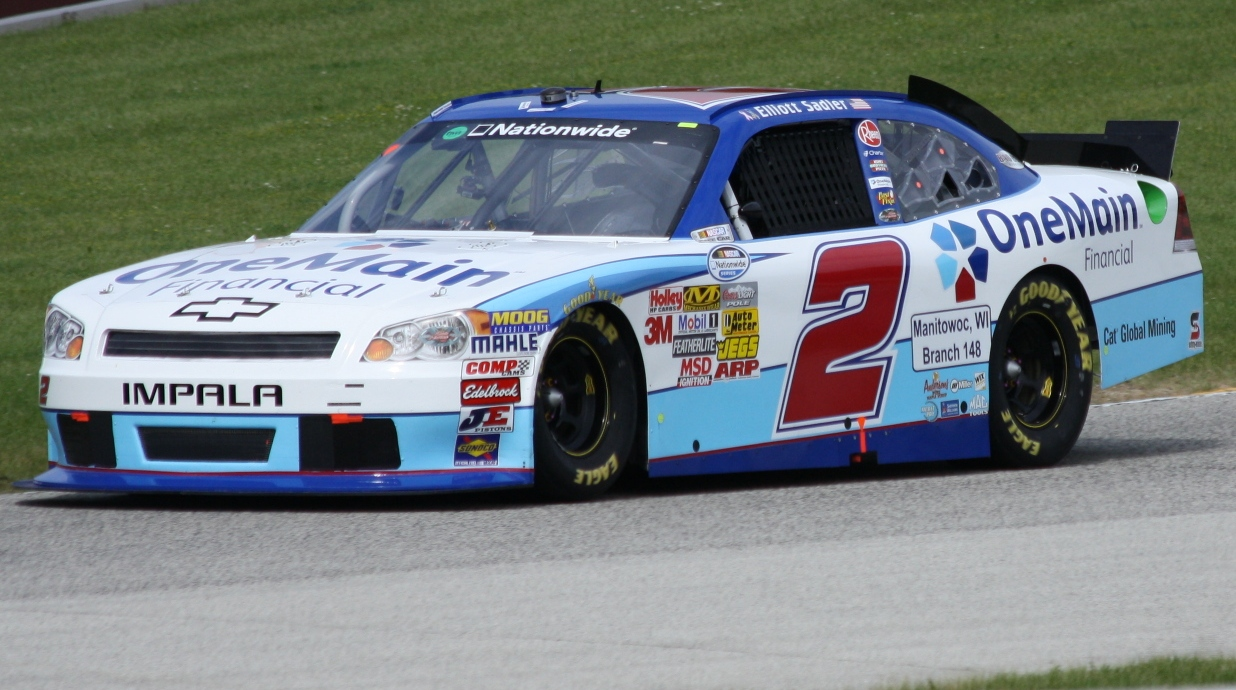
The No. 2 car at Road America in 2011

Elliott Sadler (2011)

This team ran full-time in 2011 with former Sprint Cup driver Elliott Sadler driving and Ernie Cope as the crew chief. The team struggled the early portion of the season, but soon found momentum and battled with Roush Fenway Racing driver Ricky Stenhouse Jr. for the Nationwide Series points lead. Despite the No. 2 team going winless in 2011, Sadler finished 2nd in points. The team returned in 2012 under the RCR banner.

==== No. 2 results ====
NASCAR Nationwide Series results
Year	Driver	No.	Make	1	2	3	4	5	6	7	8	9	10	11	12	13	14	15	16	17	18	19	20	21	22	23	24	25	26	27	28	29	30	31	32	33	34	NNSC	Pts	Ref
2011	Elliott Sadler	2	Chevy	DAY; 38	PHO; 12	LVS; 12	BRI; 4	CAL; 5	TEX; 5	TAL; 5	NSH; 13	RCH; 4	DAR; 3	DOV; 6	IOW; 5	CLT; 10	CHI; 11	MCH; 8	ROA; 4	DAY; 8*	KEN; 5	NHA; 12	NSH; 30	IRP; 16	IOW; 3	GLN; 10	CGV; 10	BRI; 8	ATL; 10	RCH; 6	CHI; 6	DOV; 14	KAN; 3	CLT; 4	TEX; 9	PHO; 27	HOM; 6	2nd	1177	

=== Car No. 4 history ===
Part-time (2009–2011)

For 2009, Harvick planned a one-car effort, but with additional sponsorship for the Zippo 200 at Watkins Glen from Schick Canada, J. R. Fitzpatrick drove the second car at Watkins Glen, carrying the No. 4 for KHI's second team. Tony Stewart drove the 4 in the 2010 season opener at Daytona, winning the race with Oreo/Ritz Crackers sponsorship.

Tony Stewart drove the No. 4 Oreo/Ritz Crackers Chevrolet Impala once again at Daytona in 2011. He won his fourth consecutive season opening race with a last lap pass on teammate Clint Bowyer to score his 2nd victory in a row with the No. 4 and his fourth for KHI. Harvick drove at Talladega, Daytona, and Kansas in the No. 4 with Armour Vienna Sausages, OneMain Financial, and Hunt Brothers Pizza sponsoring respectively.

==== No. 4 results ====
NASCAR Nationwide Series results
Year	Driver	No.	Make	1	2	3	4	5	6	7	8	9	10	11	12	13	14	15	16	17	18	19	20	21	22	23	24	25	26	27	28	29	30	31	32	33	34	35	Owners	Pts	Ref
2009	J.R. Fitzpatrick	4	Chevy	DAY	CAL	LVS	BRI	TEX	NSH	PHO	TAL	RCH	DAR	CLT	DOV	NSH	KEN	MLW	NHA	DAY	CHI	GTY	IRP	IOW	GLN; 18	MCH	BRI	CGV	ATL	RCH	DOV	KAN	CAL	CLT	MEM	TEX	PHO	HOM	63rd	109	
2010	Tony Stewart	4	Chevy	DAY; 1*	CAL	LVS	BRI	NSH	PHO	TEX	TAL	RCH	DAR	DOV	CLT	NSH	KEN	ROA	NHA	DAY	CHI	GTY	IRP	IOW	GLN	MCH	BRI	CGV	ATL	RCH	DOV	KAN	CAL	CLT	GTY	TEX	PHO	HOM	45th	195	
2011	Tony Stewart	4	Chevy	DAY; 1	PHO	LVS	BRI	CAL	TEX																														NA	0^{1}	
2011	Kevin Harvick	4	Chevy							TAL; 39	NSH	RCH	DAR	DOV	IOW	CLT	CHI	MCH	ROA	DAY; 18	KEN	NHA	NSH	IRP	IOW	GLN	CGV	BRI	ATL	RCH	CHI	DOV	KAN; 6	CLT	TEX	PHO	HOM		NA	0^{1}	

=== Car No. 9 history ===
Part-time (2011)

In July 2011, Tony Stewart raced a fourth KHI car at Daytona with clothing brand Tapout sponsoring. Stewart tried to sweep both Nationwide races held at Daytona, but was caught up in a late wreck.

=== Car No. 9 results ===
NASCAR Nationwide Series results
Year	Driver	No.	Make	1	2	3	4	5	6	7	8	9	10	11	12	13	14	15	16	17	18	19	20	21	22	23	24	25	26	27	28	29	30	31	32	33	34	Owners	Pts	Ref
2011	Tony Stewart	9	Chevy	DAY	PHO	LVS	BRI	CAL	TEX	TAL	NSH	RCH	DAR	DOV	IOW	CLT	CHI	MCH	ROA	DAY; 13	KEN	NHA	NSH	IRP	IOW	GLN	CGV	BRI	ATL	RCH	CHI	DOV	KAN	CLT	TEX	PHO	HOM	NA	0^{1}	

=== Car No. 33 history ===
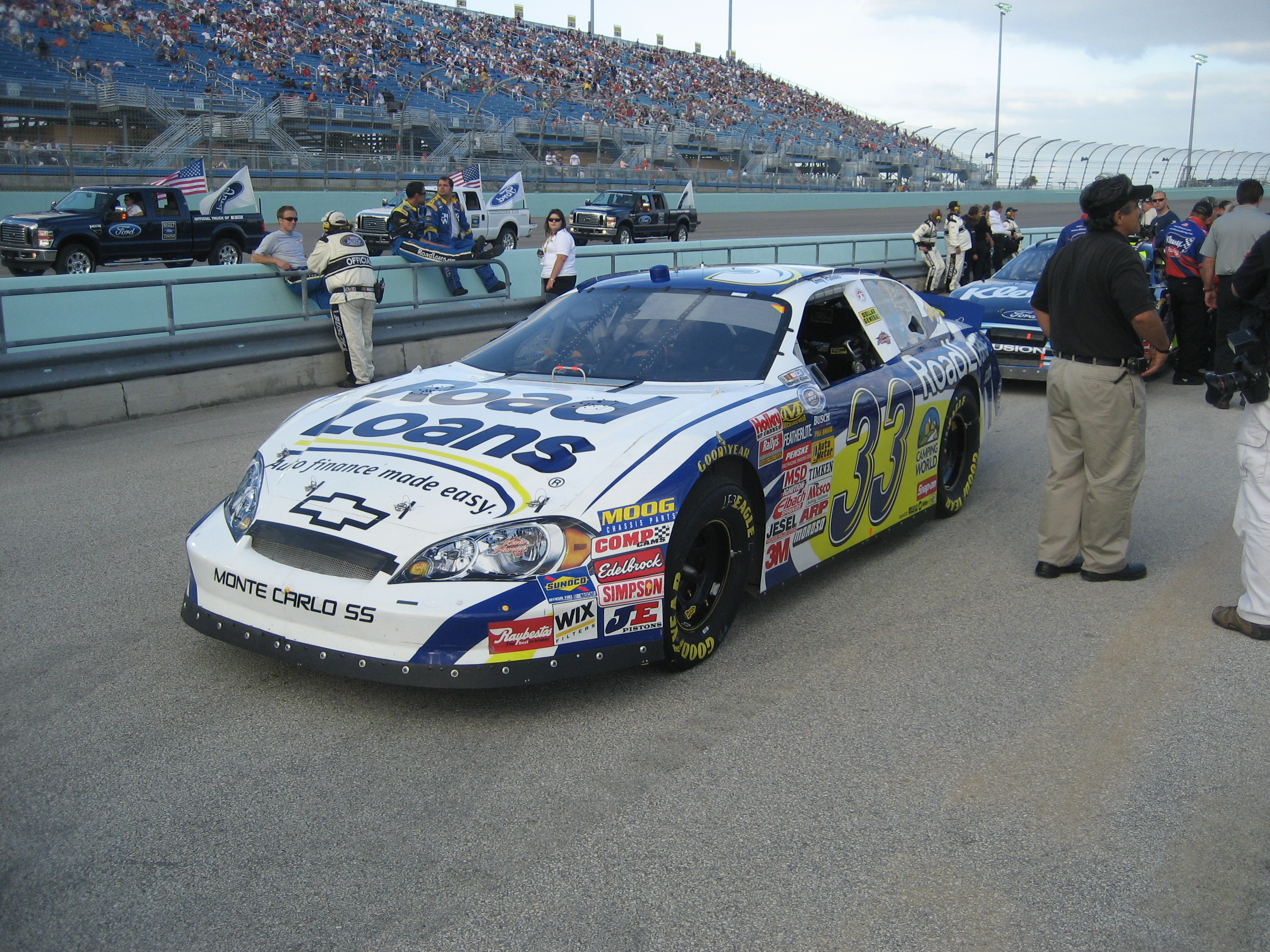
The No. 33 at Homestead in 2007. Tony Raines drove it in this race.

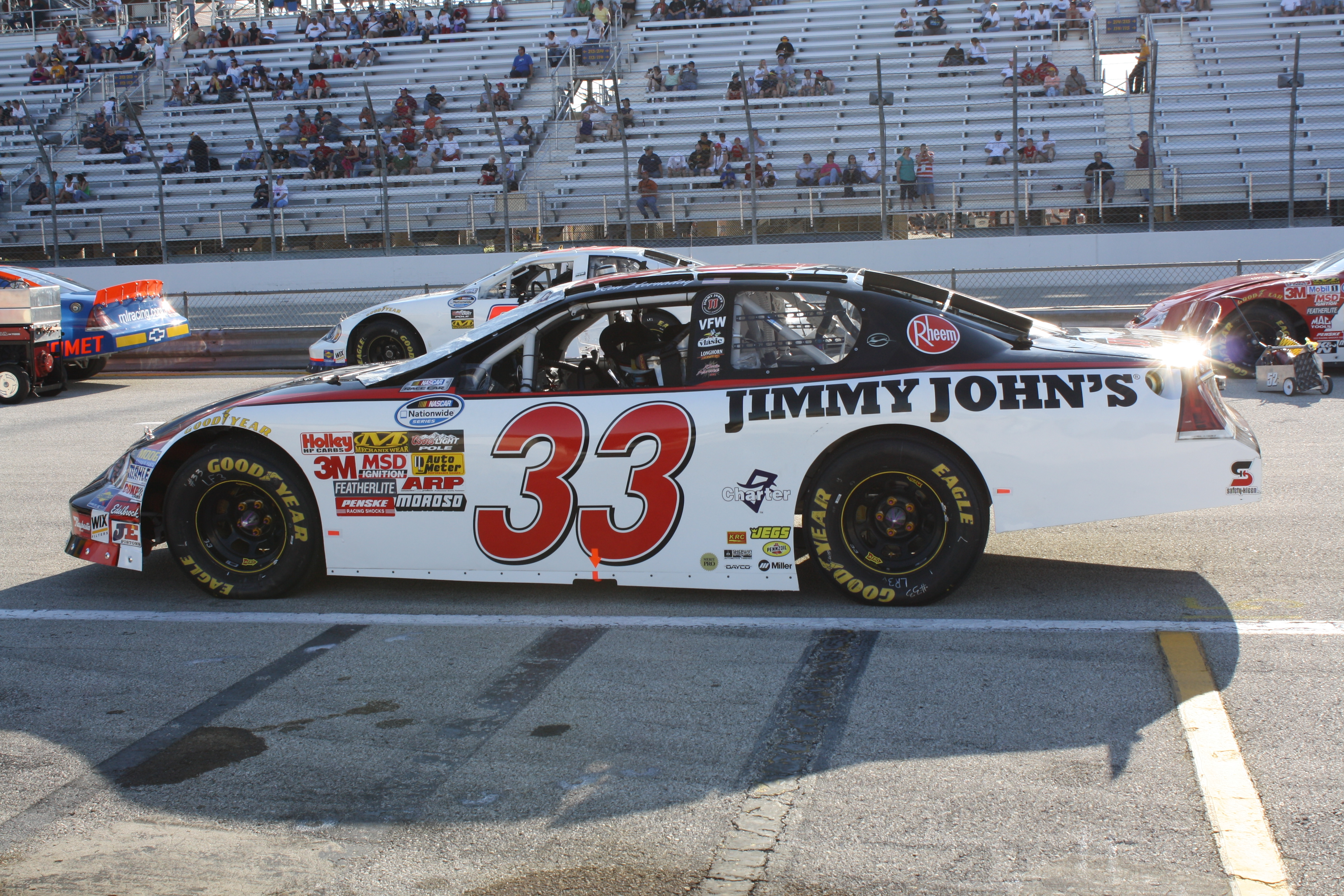
The No. 33 at Milwaukee in 2009. Ron Hornaday Jr. drove it in this race.

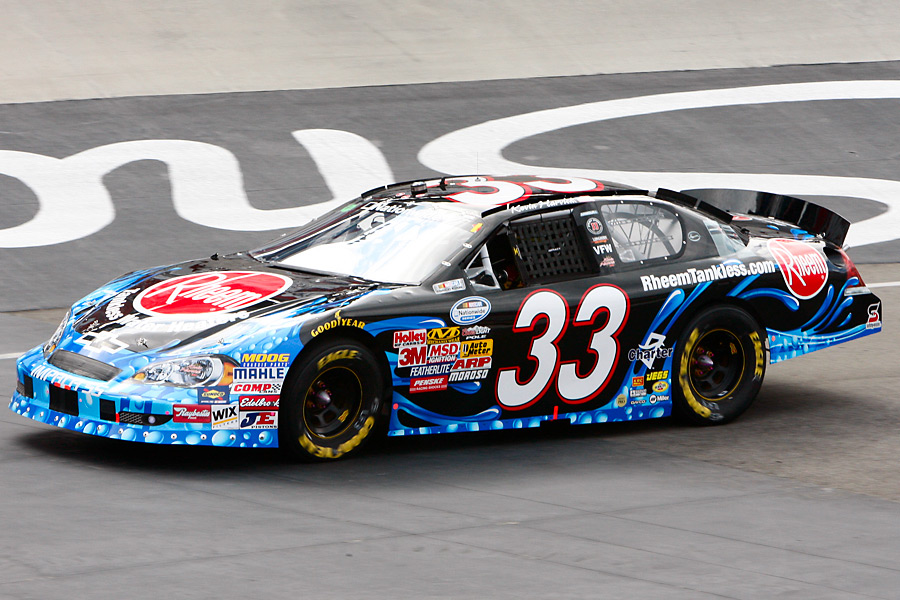
Harvick in the No. 33 at Bristol in 2009

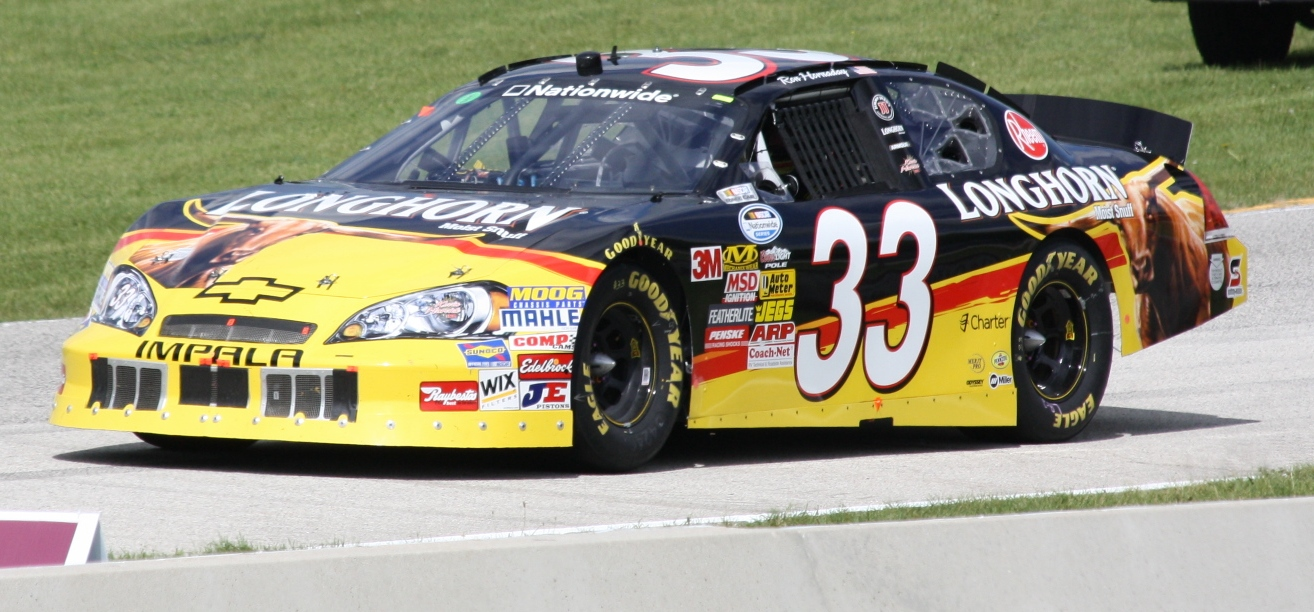
Hornaday in the No. 33 at Road America in 2010

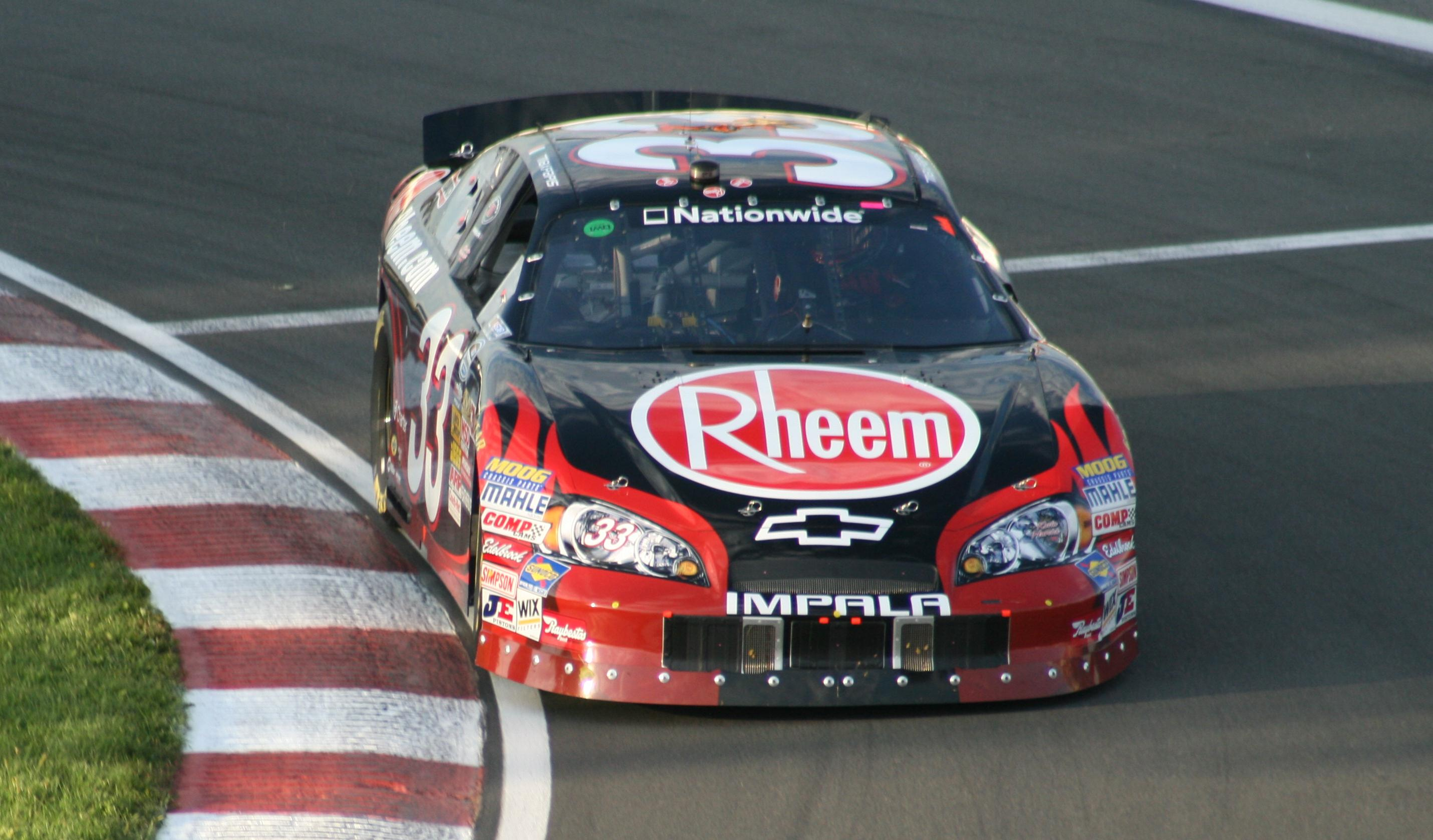
Max Papis in the No. 33 at Montreal in 2010, the race in which he famously finished second to Boris Said in a photo finish

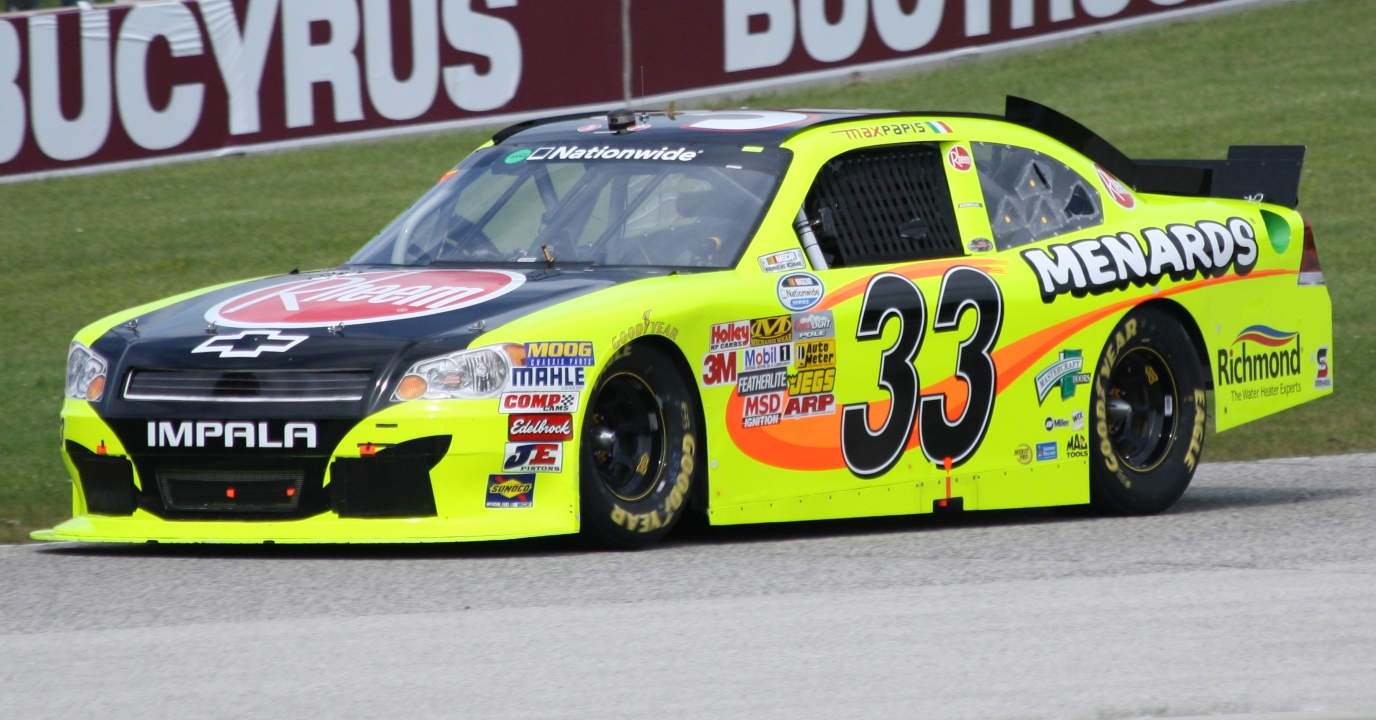
Papis returned to KHI in 2011, competing at Road America for the team

Part-time (2004)

KHI's No. 33 team was formed when Andy Petree Racing's No. 33 Busch team was shut down halfway through the 2004 season. Kevin Harvick purchased the team and it made its debut in the 19th race of the season at Chicagoland Speedway with Clint Bowyer behind the wheel. He started 40th and finished in the 42nd position due to rear end problems. He drove again at Darlington Raceway and finished 15th. Tony Raines ended the season at the Ford 300 with a 35th-place finish after being involved in a crash.

Multiple drivers (2005-2011)

Tony Stewart won the team's first NASCAR Busch Series race in 2005 by winning the Hershey's Take 5 300 at Daytona in February. Stewart and Raines shared the 33 that season, with Stewart running races with Old Spice sponsorship, and Raines with Yard Man/Outdoor Channel backing. Raines collected nine top-ten finishes and finished 20th in the points despite only running 23 races. Stewart's lone win in 10 races came at Daytona and had only three top-five finishes. KHI development driver Burney Lamar joined the 33 for a pair of races as well, his best finish a 34th at Homestead.

In 2002 Canadian driver Ron Fellows befriended Harvick and asked for a ride. Harvick agreed to put Fellows in some Busch Series races in the No. 33 Chevy on several occasions during the years. Fellows performed well on the road courses and had some nice performances on some oval tracks. The last time he raced for Kevin Harvick, Inc. was in 2007 at Watkins Glen. Kevin Harvick asked Fellows to drive on occasion for KHI in 2007 for one more year and Fellows agreed. In 2007 at Montreal, Fellows almost won the first NBS race there, but placed 4th after a late crash.

The 2006 again started strong as Stewart again drove the No. 33 to a win at Daytona with teammate Lamar finishing second in the No. 77, marking the first time that the Linville family had fielded a winner in the series, dating to its inaugural year. A variety of drivers competed in the No. 33 during the 2006 season, including Stewart, Harvick, Hornaday, and development drivers Sean Caisse and Aaron Fike. The team finished tenth in the standings at the season. Harvick, Stewart, Raines, and development driver Cale Gale shared the No. 33 Chevrolet in 2007, with sponsorship coming from Old Spice, Camping World, and RoadLoans.com. Harvick, Gale, and Hornaday split the 33 full-time in 2008, scoring fifteen finishes of eighth or better between them. The 33 returned in 2009 with sponsors Rheem, Jimmy John's, Armour Vienna Sausages and Copart. The 33 was driven by Harvick, Stewart, Ryan Newman, Ron Hornaday Jr. along with Gale and Kelly Bires in one race deals. Kevin Harvick finally drove his own equipment to victory in the Scotts Turf Builder 300 at Bristol. This would be the first time he scored a victory in his own equipment after trying for 5 years since the inception of his race team during 2004. The driver lineup changed for 2010 with Harvick, Hornaday, Mike Bliss, Elliott Sadler and Road Ringer Max Papis at Road America and Circuit Gilles Villeneuve with Harvick taking 3 victories at Vegas, Nashville, and Richmond.

For 2011, the No. 33 carried dual sponsorship from both Rheem and Menards, with Kevin Harvick, Clint Bowyer, Austin Dillon, and new RCR driver Paul Menard splitting the driving duties. Former Red Bull driver Scott Speed intended to drive at the May Iowa race, but his commitment to Dragon Racing for the 2011 Indianapolis 500 prevented him from competing. Speed would drive the car at Montreal and Max Papis drove at Road America. Truck Series driver David Mayhew would make his series debut at the fall Iowa race. The 33 team would finish fourth in owners points, but would go winless. The 33 team was transferred over to RCR for 2012.

=== Car No. 77, 83 & 92 history ===
Part-time as the No. 92 (2004)

KHI first entered its second Busch Series team in the 2004 fall race at Atlanta Motor Speedway when Tony Stewart piloted the No. 92 McDonald's/Powerade Chevrolet. As a co-promotion in the event, team owner Kevin Harvick drove the No. 29 Powerade/McDonald's Chevrolet for Richard Childress Racing.

Part-time as the No. 83 (2005)

The team returned in 2005 renumbered as the No. 83 to run five races. Burney Lamar attempted the car's first race at Nashville Superspeedway but failed to qualify for the event. Wally Dallenbach Jr. made the car's first race at Watkins Glen International, where he finished nineteenth in the Mr. Clean Auto-Dry Wash car. Tony Stewart drove the car at Richmond with Old Spice sponsoring and Tony Raines drove the car with Cub Cadet funding at Kansas, finishing 40th and 17th, respectively.

Burney Lamar and the No. 77 (2006)

For 2006, the team signed Dollar General as a sponsor and switched to the No. 77 with Lamar driving and competing for NASCAR Rookie of the Year. He opened the season with a runner-up finish at Daytona, and had two additional top-tens and led the Rookie of the Year standings until summer. During the race weekend at Kansas in 2006, Harvick announced he had removed Lamar from the No. 77, due to Dollar General wanting Cup drivers in the No. 77 and hired 2000 Winston Cup champion Bobby Labonte to drive the car for the rest of the season.

Multiple drivers (2007)

Labonte, Harvick, and Kertus Davis were scheduled share the 77 for the 2007 season. Labonte brought the number 77 to its first victory at Talladega on April 28, 2007. Davis was later released, with Ron Hornaday Jr. filling in for races that Davis was scheduled to drive for the team, after Davis did not crack the top 30 in his five starts in the No. 77.

Part-time (2008)

In 2008, Cale Gale drove the car in three races with sponsorship from VFW and Rheem.

== Camping World Truck Series ==
=== Truck No. 2, 4 & 92 history ===
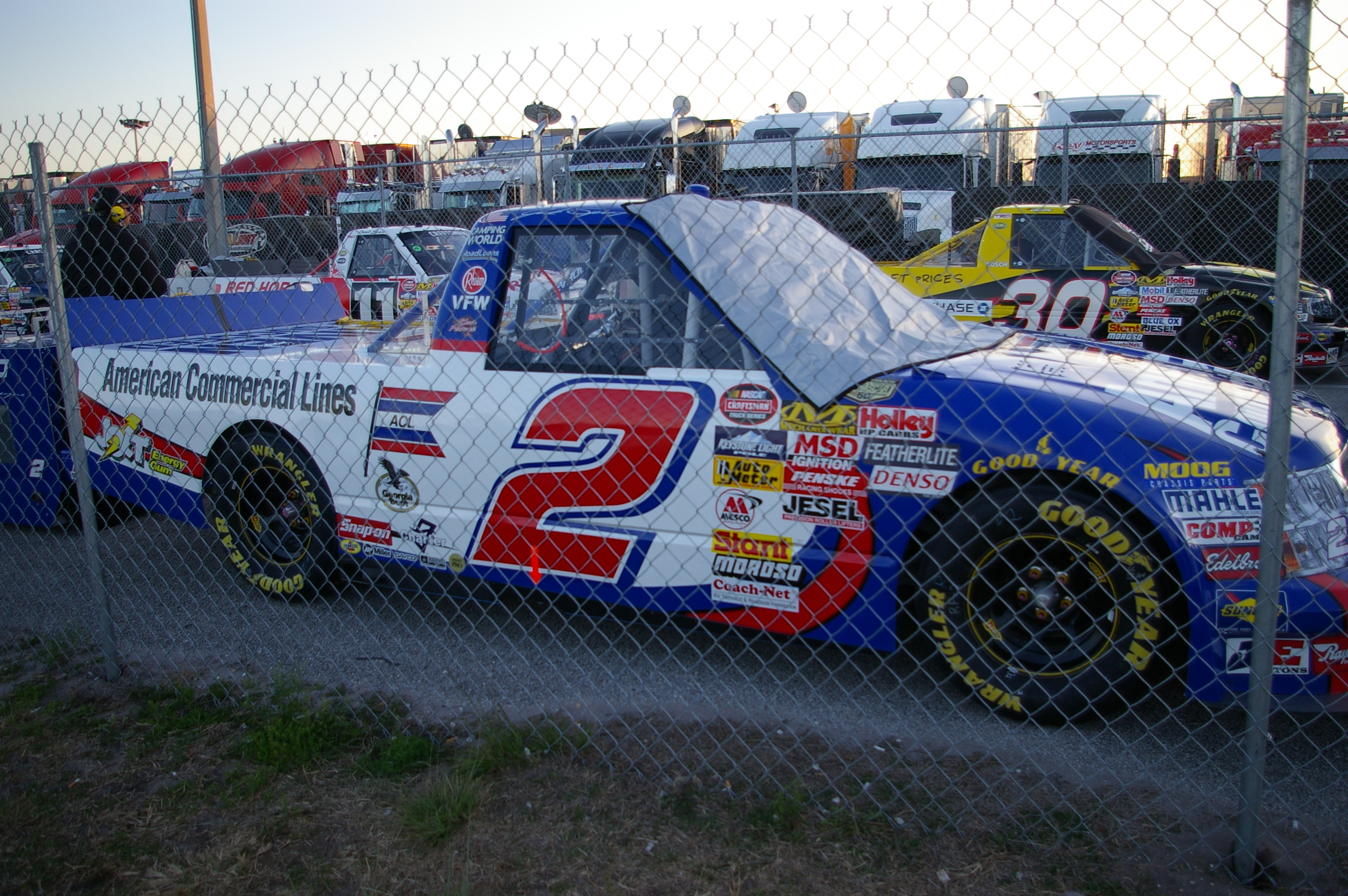
The No. 2 truck in 2008, driven by Jack Sprague

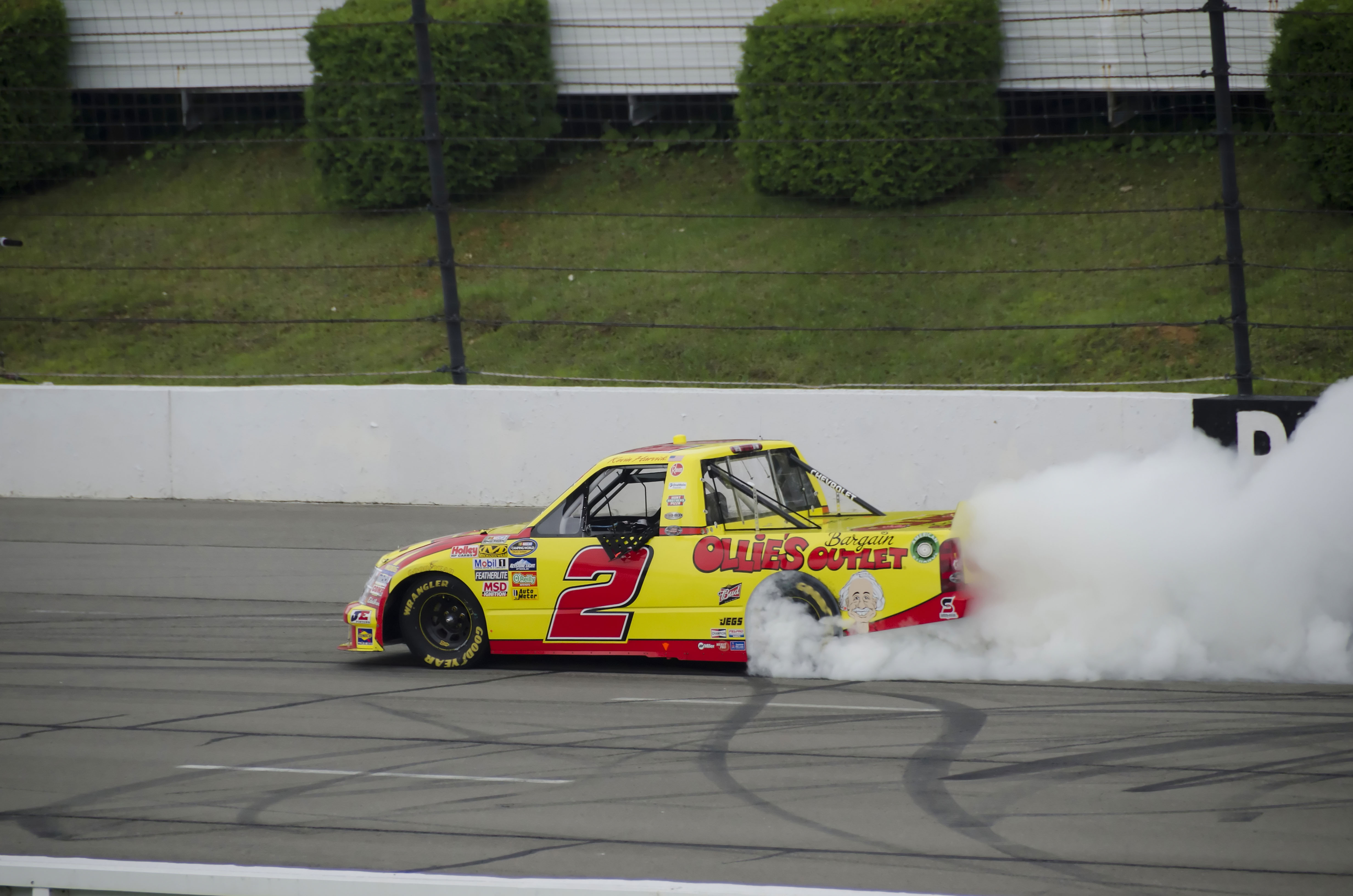
Harvick doing a burnout at Pocono after winning the race there in 2011

Part-time as the No. 92 (2004–2005)

The No. 2 truck originally ran as a second truck to the No. 6 in 2004 for a pair of races as the No. 92. Harvick drove with sponsorship from Snap-On Tools and GM Goodwrench sponsoring, with Harvick finished in the top-five in both races. It ran again in 2005 for two races with Harvick and another two with Lamar. Harvick had the best finish of fifth. Tony Stewart attempted the race at Richmond, but, surprisingly, failed to qualify for the race, despite winning the past two Richmond truck races, mainly from NASCAR's new all-exempt tour policy.

Part-time as the No. 2 (2007)

The truck in 2007 was used for most of the season, running a Part-Time Schedule with a variety of drivers, from KHI developmental driver, Cale Gale to Richard Childress Racing Nextel Cup drivers, Harvick and Clint Bowyer in the No. 2.

Jack Sprague and others (2008)

For the 2008 season, Jack Sprague was signed on to pilot the No. 2 truck Full Time with sponsorship from American Commercial Lines. However, Sprague was unable to find victory lane and was released on October 8. Harvick, Gale, and Ryan Newman shared this truck for the remainder of the season. Newman drove this truck to victory lane in the final fall race at Atlanta with a late pass on Ron Hornaday Jr.

Multiple drivers as the No. 4 (2009)

Former motocross champion Ricky Carmichael was signed to KHI in 2009, which changed its number to No. 4 out of deference to Carmichael, who raced No. 4 for most of his career. Monster Energy sponsored the truck. Carmichael was caught up in an accident in the season opener. The team rebounded and scored a better finish at the Auto Club Speedway. Carmichael was set to make 14 of the 25 Camping World Truck Series races, with J. R. Fitzpatrick filling out the rest of the schedule. Carmichael and Monster Energy left KHI at the end of the season to race for Turner Scott Motorsports. Ryan Newman and Kevin Harvick also drove the entry for a combined 4 races.

Multiple drivers (2010–2011)

In 2010, the truck returned to being the 2 with Harvick driving, along with Elliott Sadler, Clint Bowyer, Ken Schrader, and Shelby Howard sharing the duties. The 2 team garnered 5 wins, 3 by Harvick (Atlanta, Martinsville, Gateway), 1 by Clint Bowyer (Phoenix), and 1 by Sadler (Pocono). In addition the team finished with 11 top fives and 16 top tens. The team finished 5th in the final owners points. For 2011, Bowyer, Sadler, and Harvick primarily drove the 2 truck, and Cale Gale returned for six races with Rheem on board. The team would capture 7 wins, with Bowyer winning at Phoenix and Kansas, Harvick won 3 in a row at Pocono, Michigan, and Bristol, Ron Hornaday Jr. drove the truck for 3 races late in the season, winning at Kentucky and Las Vegas, while Harvick won at Texas to easily take the Owners Championship. For 2012, the team was absorbed by Richard Childress Racing.

=== Truck No. 8 history ===
Nelson Piquet Jr. (2011)

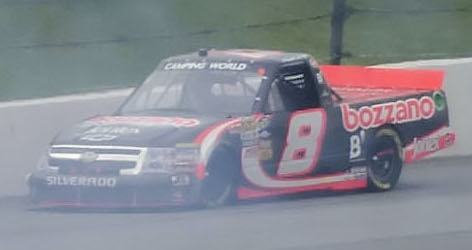
The No. 8 truck at Pocono in 2011

The No. 8 truck originally ran as a third truck in 2009 for four races as the No. 2. Ryan Newman and Harvick finished within the top-five in all four starts, with Harvick winning in Martinsville.

Kevin Harvick, Inc. signed Nelson Piquet Jr. to drive this truck full-time in 2011. Nelson ran for NASCAR Rookie of the Year. This was one of the first times the No. 8 truck had run since 1997 when Joe Nemechek's brother John Nemechek was killed. Piquet ran full-time with sponsors Qualcomm, Autotrac, Bozzano, Jontex and others. Piquet would finish 10th in his inaugural NASCAR season, but came runner up to Joey Coulter for rookie of the year honors.

This truck was bought out by Eddie Sharp Racing for 2012.

=== Truck No. 6 history ===
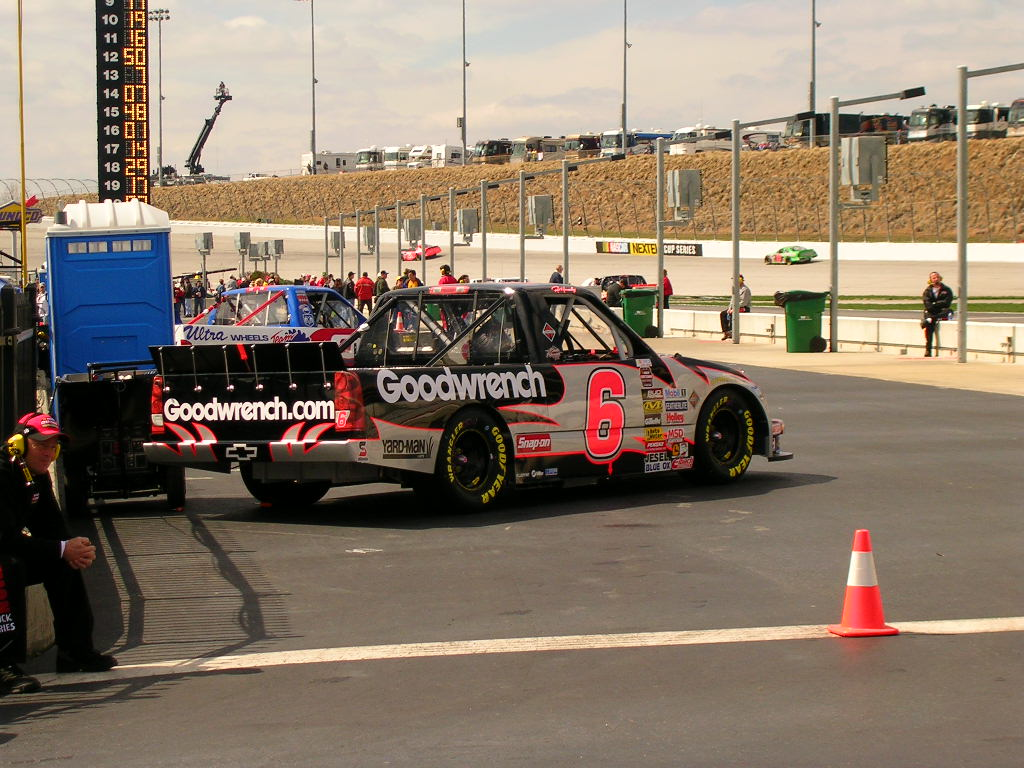
Ron Hornaday Jr. No. 6 truck at Atlanta in 2005

Part-time (2002)

The No. 6 truck was Kevin Harvick, Inc.'s first ever truck. It was built in 2001 when Harvick started his self-owned team for 2002 modeled after RCR and Dale Earnhardt, Inc. Initially the company was called Kevin Harvick Motorsports, but it was renamed to KHI in later 2002. In its first race it was driven by Rick Carelli and finished in 5th at Daytona. In its second race at Darlington it finished in 4th place. At Martinsville, Harvick intentionally spun Coy Gibbs causing NASCAR to park the team for the balance of the event. When Harvick lied to reporters, his sponsors and fans; about not intentionally crashing Gibbs, this led to a suspension from the cup race the next morning, a $25,000 fine and a 25 points loss for the truck series. Following this incident Harvick did not race the next event at Gateway to make amends. Later that year, Harvick won the team's first win at Phoenix in autumn and the next year the No. 6 team was folded into the No. 33 team (see below.)

=== Truck No. 6 & 33 history ===
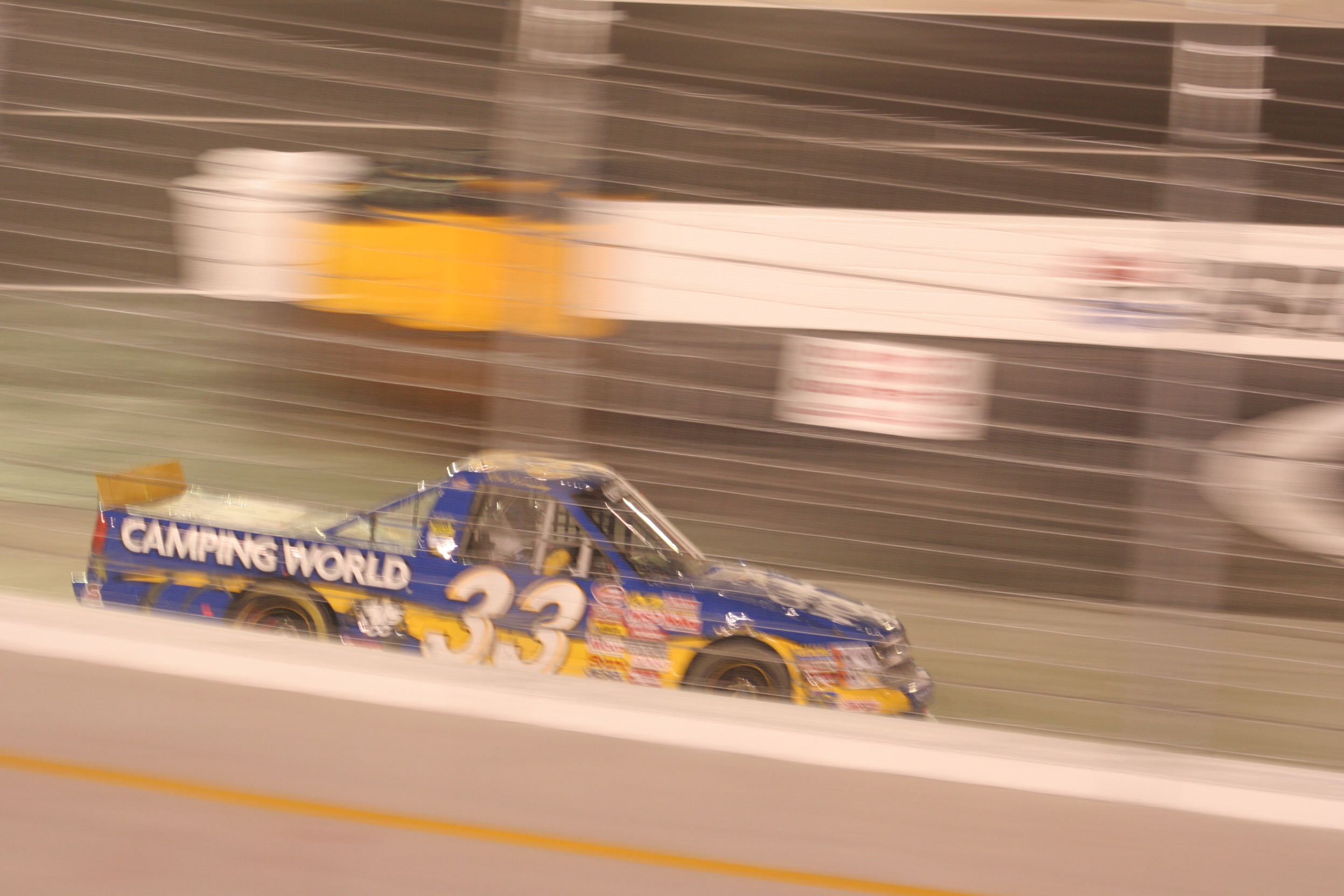
The No. 33 truck at Bristol in 2007

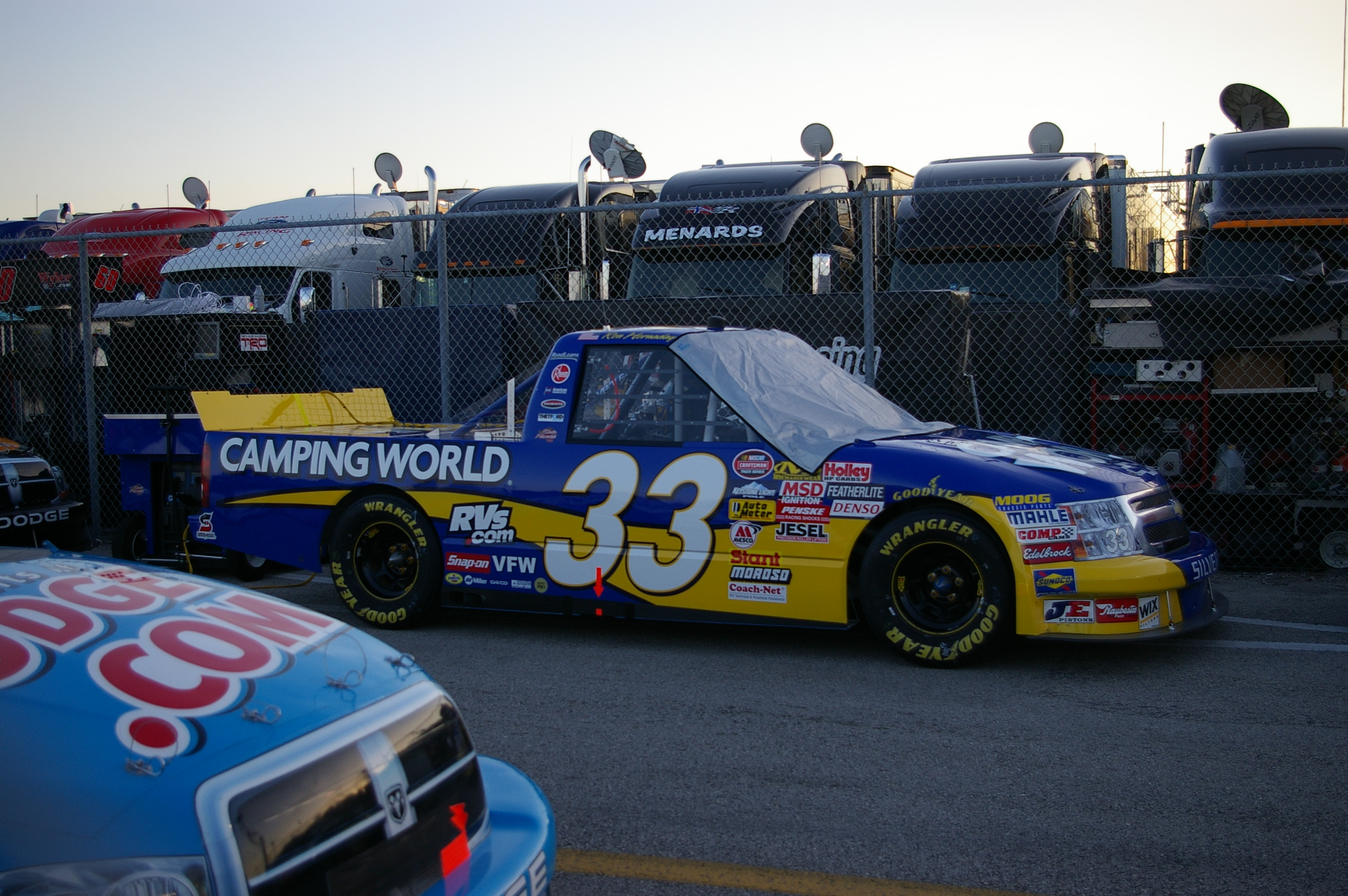
The No. 33 truck sitting on a road in the infield at Daytona in 2008

Part-time (2001–2003)

The No. 33 truck was KHI's first venture into NASCAR. It debuted as the No. 6 Twizzlers/PayDay/Sonic Drive-In Chevrolet Silverado in a partnership between the Harvicks and Rick Carelli in 2001. Harvick started fourth and finished second at Richmond. Carelli drove the team's next race at the 2002 Florida Dodge Dealers 250 and finished fifth. Harvick competed in five races and picked up his first career Truck win at Phoenix. In 2003, Harvick ran an additional six races and won once again at Phoenix. Other drivers drove for the team that year were Ed Berrier, Brandon Miller, and Randy LaJoie. Miller had the best finish of eighth at Mesa Marin Raceway.

Matt Crafton (2004)

In 2004, GM Goodwrench climbed aboard as the team's first primary sponsor, and Matt Crafton was hired away from ThorSport Racing as the team's driver. Crafton posted six top-five finishes and finished fifth in points, but was released at the end of the season to return to his previous ride.

Ron Hornaday (2005, 2006–2011)

Crafton was replaced by two-time champion Ron Hornaday Jr., who captured a win at Atlanta Motor Speedway and was named the series' Most Popular Driver.

As the No. 33

At the end of 2005, KHI switched numbers with Roush Fenway Racing to become the No. 33, with the No. 6 going to Roush Fenway. Hornaday Jr. began the year unsponsored but won at Mansfield Motor Speedway and finished seventh in points after obtaining sponsorship from Allstate. He began 2007 with new sponsorship from Camping World, picked up four victories, and won the 2007 Craftsman Truck Series championship. In 2008, Hornaday won six times but finished second in the championship standings. In 2009 he'd win his fourth championship, a week before the last race of the season.

In 2010, the 33 team found itself in a slump. Due to the Food and Drug Administration passing a new rule that bans the advertisement of tobacco products, Longhorn dropped its sponsorship mid season, forcing the 33 to run with one race deals until E-Z-GO signed on with a few races remaining. The 33 team brushed off the bad luck with a win at IRP where he would hold off Kyle Busch. Hornaday Jr. won again at Martinsville and ended up 7th in points.

For 2011, Hornaday returned to the 33 team and won early in the year at Texas. However, the team struggled midway through the season and lost ground in the points. After Harvick had Hornaday switch over to the 2 truck, Cale Gale would take over the 33 for 2 races while Mike Wallace would drive at Talladega and win his first Truck race since 2000. Hornaday returned to the 33 for the last 3 races of the season and finished second at Martinsville, but was knocked out of the championship hunt at Texas by Kyle Busch and finished 13th at Homestead, ending up 4th in points. The 33 was driven by Cale Gale full-time in 2012 with Eddie Sharp Racing fielding the truck.

== Sale and reorganization ==
In September 2011, it was announced that KHI would cease to exist following that season, with its teams and equipment being absorbed or bought by other organizations. Harvick's Cup team Richard Childress Racing restarted its Nationwide Series program by merging it with that of KHI, moving the No. 2 team of Elliott Sadler which would finish second in points and the flagship No. 33 which Harvick would continue to drive to the RCR banner. Harvick's truck program was primarily sold to Eddie Sharp Racing, acquiring the No. 8 truck and No. 33 truck. While Nelson Piquet Jr. moved to Turner Scott Motorsports, development driver Cale Gale and longtime sponsor Rheem went with the No. 33 to ESR, winning the 2012 season finale at Homestead. KHI's 2 truck was also sold to RCR and Harvick continued to drive it in 2012 for 3 races. Harvick's good friend and most successful driver Ron Hornaday Jr. moved on to Joe Denette Motorsports (now NTS Motorsports), which received equipment and support from KHI, for 2012 and 2013 driving their No. 9 truck. Harvick continued to drive NTS's 14 truck in a partial schedule in 2013, and NTS also moved into the former KHI shop prior to the season.

According to Harvick, the sale of the team overall was so he could focus winning a Cup championship. For the Xfinity Series program specifically, Harvick stated that the similarity between them and the Cup cars (same chassis and similar bodies) made the costs and resource requirements too great for a non-Cup-affiliated team to function. Kevin Harvick Incorporated currently operates as a sports marketing and management firm, which includes MMA fighters as well as former teammate Jeff Burton. They now represent Harrison Burton, Ricky Stenhouse Jr., Ryan Preece, Shane van Gisbergen and Ty Dillon along with others.

In October 2024, KHI announced a partnership with Rackley W.A.R. for both the Truck Series and Super Late Model programs.

== CARS Tour ==
On January 9, 2023, a consortium consisting of KHI, DEJ Management, Jeff Burton Autosports, Inc., and Trackhouse Racing purchased the CARS Tour.

=== Car No. 29 history ===
On February 6, 2024, it was announced that KHI would field a full-time entry in the CARS Tour in 2024. The team announced Brent Crews as the driver of their No. 29 car, with sponsorship from Mobil 1. For 2025 Kevin Harvick would take over the #29 part-time reducing the car to a part-time entry.

=== Car No. 62 history ===
On March 22, 2023, it was announced that Harvick would run select CARS Tour races, starting at North Wilkesboro Speedway, in the No. 62 car, resurrecting the KHI moniker in racing. On November 11, Josh Berry drove the No. 62 at Hickory Motor Speedway. He also participated at Florence Motor Speedway on November 18 and at Southern National Motorsports Park on November 26. Ryan Preece raced at the Snowball Derby on December 6. The No. 62 will return in 2024, running full-time with Josh Berry, William Sawalich, Layne Riggs, and Landen Lewis. They will also run select Super Late Model events, with Berry, Sawalich, Lewis, and Ryan Preece behind the wheel. For 2025, Keelan Harvick, son of owner Kevin Harvick, would take over the #62 full-time.
