= 1988 Daytona 500 =

First race of the 1988 NASCAR Winston Cup Series

Race details
- Race 1 of 29 in the 1988 NASCAR Winston Cup Series
- The 1988 Daytona 500 program cover, featuring Richard Petty.
- Date: February 14, 1988
- Official name: 30th Annual Daytona 500
- Location: Daytona Beach, Florida, Daytona International Speedway
- Course: Permanent racing facility
- Course length: 2.5 miles (4.0 km)
- Distance: 200 laps, 500 mi (804.672 km)
- Average speed: 137.531 miles per hour (221.335 km/h)
- Attendance: 135,000

Pole position
Driver	Ken Schrader	Hendrick Motorsports
- Time: 46.434

Most laps led
Driver	Bobby Allison	Stavola Brothers Racing
- Laps: 70

Winner
No. 12	Bobby Allison	Stavola Brothers Racing

Television in the United States
- Network: CBS
- Announcers: Ken Squier, Chris Economaki, Ned Jarrett

Radio in the United States
- Radio: Motor Racing Network

The 1988 Daytona 500 was the first stock car race of the 1988 NASCAR Winston Cup Series season and the 30th iteration of the event. The race was held on Sunday, February 14, 1988, before an audience of 135,000 in Daytona Beach, Florida at Daytona International Speedway, a 2.5 miles (4.0 km) permanent triangular-shaped superspeedway. The race took the scheduled 200 laps to complete. In the final laps of the race, Stavola Brothers Racing's Bobby Allison managed to fend off his son, Ranier-Lundy Racing's Davey Allison to the finish to take his 85th and final career NASCAR Winston Cup Series victory, his only victory of the season, and his third Daytona 500 victory. Jackson Bros. Motorsports' Phil Parsons rounded out the top three.

== Background ==
The layout of Daytona International Speedway, the venue where the race was held.

Daytona International Speedway is one of three superspeedways to hold NASCAR races, the other two being Indianapolis Motor Speedway and Talladega Superspeedway. The standard track at Daytona International Speedway is a four-turn superspeedway that is 2.5 miles (4.0 km) long. The track's turns are banked at 31 degrees, while the front stretch, the location of the finish line, is banked at 18 degrees.

=== Entry list ===
- (R) denotes rookie driver.

#	Driver	Team	Make	Sponsor
0	Rodney Combs (Note: Combs' car blew an engine during a Wednesday, February 10 session. As the team had no backup car, Combs withdrew from the event.)	Inglass Racing	Oldsmobile	Inglass Racing
0	Delma Cowart	H. L. Waters Racing	Oldsmobile	Heyward Grooms Construction
1	Dale Jarrett	Ellington Racing	Buick	Port-A-Lube
01	Mickey Gibbs	Gibbs Racing	Ford	Gibbs–West Tractor
2	Ernie Irvan (R)	U.S. Racing	Chevrolet	Kroger, Pepsi
02	Joe Booher	Booher Racing	Pontiac	Booher Racing
3	Dale Earnhardt	Richard Childress Racing	Chevrolet	GM Goodwrench
03	Dave Pletcher Sr.	Weaver Racing	Ford	J. C. Weaver
4	Rick Wilson	Morgan–McClure Motorsports	Oldsmobile	Kodak
5	Geoff Bodine	Hendrick Motorsports	Chevrolet	Levi Garrett
6	Mark Martin	Roush Racing	Ford	Stroh's Light
7	Alan Kulwicki	AK Racing	Ford	Zerex
07	Larry Moyer	Stark Racing	Pontiac	Just Say No!, Hooters
8	Bobby Hillin Jr.	Stavola Brothers Racing	Buick	Miller High Life
9	Bill Elliott	Melling Racing	Ford	Coors Brewing Company
10	Ken Bouchard (R)	Whitcomb Racing	Ford	Whitcomb Racing
11	Terry Labonte	Junior Johnson & Associates	Chevrolet	Budweiser
12	Bobby Allison	Stavola Brothers Racing	Buick	Miller High Life
14	A. J. Foyt	A. J. Foyt Racing	Oldsmobile	Copenhagen
15	Brett Bodine	Bud Moore Engineering	Ford	Crisco
17	Darrell Waltrip	Hendrick Motorsports	Chevrolet	Tide
18	Sarel van der Merwe	Hendrick Motorsports	Chevrolet	Superflo
21	Kyle Petty	Wood Brothers Racing	Ford	Citgo
22	Steve Moore	Hamby Racing	Chevrolet	Hamby Racing
23	Eddie Bierschwale	B&B Racing	Chevrolet	Wayne Paging
24	Bobby Coyle	Gray Racing	Chevrolet	Gray Racing
25	Ken Schrader	Hendrick Motorsports	Chevrolet	Folgers
26	Ricky Rudd	King Racing	Buick	Quaker State
27	Rusty Wallace	Blue Max Racing	Pontiac	Kodiak
28	Davey Allison	Ranier-Lundy Racing	Ford	Texaco, Havoline
29	Cale Yarborough	Cale Yarborough Motorsports	Oldsmobile	Hardee's
30	Michael Waltrip (Note: After Waltrip failed to qualify, his team offered to buy up a car who qualified for the race in order for Waltrip to race, as the race was in Waltrip's contract. Jim Sauter and his team, Mueller Brothers Racing, who had managed to qualify for the race accepted the offer, allowing Waltrip to race in place of Sauter.)	Bahari Racing	Pontiac	Country Time
31	Brad Teague	Bob Clark Motorsports	Oldsmobile	Slender You Figure Salons
33	Harry Gant	Mach 1 Racing	Chevrolet	Skoal Bandit
34	Donnie Allison	AAG Racing	Oldsmobile	Allen's Associated Glass
39	Blackie Wangerin	Wangerin Racing	Ford	Wangerin Racing
43	Richard Petty	Petty Enterprises	Pontiac	STP
44	Sterling Marlin	Hagan Racing	Oldsmobile	Piedmont Airlines
48	Tony Spanos	Hylton Motorsports	Chevrolet	Hylton Motorsports
49	Mike Porter	Hylton Motorsports	Chevrolet	Hylton Motorsports
50	Greg Sacks	Dingman Brothers Racing	Pontiac	Dingman Brothers Racing
52	Jimmy Means	Jimmy Means Racing	Chevrolet	Eureka
54	Ronnie Sanders	Gray Racing	Chevrolet	Phoenix Construction
55	Phil Parsons	Jackson Bros. Motorsports	Oldsmobile	Skoal, Crown Central Petroleum
56	Joey Sonntag	Sonntag Racing	Chevrolet	Sonntag Racing
57	Bobby Wawak	Wawak Racing	Chevrolet	Nelson Contracting
59	Mark Gibson	Gibson Racing	Pontiac	Gibson Racing
63	Jocko Maggiacomo	Linro Motorsports	Chevrolet	Linro Motorsports
64	Mike Potter	Potter Racing	Chevrolet	Eagle Engines
67	Buddy Arrington	Arrington Racing	Ford	Pannill Sweatshirts
68	Derrike Cope	Testa Racing	Ford	Purolator
70	J. D. McDuffie	McDuffie Racing	Pontiac	Rumple Furniture
71	Dave Marcis	Marcis Auto Racing	Chevrolet	Lifebuoy
72	Charlie Rudolph (Note: Rudolph crashed in a Tuesday, February 9 practice session. As the team did not have a backup car, Rudolph withdrew from the event.)	Rudolph Racing	Pontiac	Rudolph Racing
73	Phil Barkdoll	Barkdoll Racing	Ford	Helen Rae Special
74	John Linville	Wawak Racing	Chevrolet	Nelson Contracting
75	Neil Bonnett	RahMoc Enterprises	Pontiac	Valvoline
77	Ken Ragan	Ragan Racing	Ford	Bob Beard Ford
80	Jimmy Horton (R)	S&H Racing	Ford	S&H Racing
82	Mark Stahl	Stahl Racing	Ford	Auto Bell Car Wash
83	Lake Speed	Speed Racing	Oldsmobile	Wynn's, Kmart
85	Bobby Gerhart	Bobby Gerhart Racing	Chevrolet	J. Omar Landis Enterprises
86	Rick Jeffrey	Jeffrey Racing	Chevrolet	Slenderizers
88	Buddy Baker	Baker–Schiff Racing	Oldsmobile	Red Baron Frozen Pizza
89	Jim Sauter	Mueller Brothers Racing	Pontiac	Evinrude Outboard Motors
90	Benny Parsons	Donlavey Racing	Ford	Bull's-Eye Barbecue Sauce
92	Ralph Jones	LC Racing	Ford	LC Racing
95	Trevor Boys	Sadler Brothers Racing	Chevrolet	Sadler Brothers Racing
97	Morgan Shepherd	Winkle Motorsports	Buick	AC Spark Plug
98	Ed Pimm	Curb Racing	Buick	Sunoco
99	Connie Saylor	Ball Motorsports	Chevrolet	Ball Motorsports

== Qualifying ==
Qualifying was set by the 1988 Twin 125 Qualifiers. The top two positions were set by qualifying speeds held for the Twin 125 Qualifiers held on Saturday, February 6, with the top two qualifiers in the session earning the top two positions for the Daytona 500. The rest of the starting was set in the Twin 125 Qualifiers, held on Thursday, February 11, during two races. The top 14 finishers in the first race, excluding the pole position winner, set the inside row from rows two to 15, and the top 14 finishers in the second race, excluding the outside pole position winner, set the outside row from rows two to 15. The remaining non-qualifiers set positions 31-40 based on qualifying speeds from the first qualifying session held on Saturday. If needed, up to two extra provisionals were given to teams high enough in the previous season's owner's standings that did not qualify for the race by either qualifying speed or from the Twin 125 Qualifiers.

Ken Schrader, driving for Hendrick Motorsports, managed to win the pole, setting a time of 46.434 and an average speed of 193.823 miles per hour (311.928 km/h) in Saturday's session.

27 drivers failed to qualify.

=== Full qualifying results ===
Pos.	#	Driver	Team	Make	Reason
1	25	Ken Schrader	Hendrick Motorsports	Chevrolet	Qualified on pole
2	28	Davey Allison	Ranier-Lundy Racing	Ford	Qualified on outside pole
3	12	Bobby Allison	Stavola Brothers Racing	Buick	First in Twin 125 #1
4	17	Darrell Waltrip	Hendrick Motorsports	Chevrolet	First in Twin 125 #2
5	27	Rusty Wallace	Blue Max Racing	Pontiac	Second in Twin 125 #1
6	3	Dale Earnhardt	Richard Childress Racing	Chevrolet	Second in Twin 125 #2
7	50	Greg Sacks	Dingman Brothers Racing	Pontiac	Fourth in Twin 125 #1
8	11	Terry Labonte	Junior Johnson & Associates	Chevrolet	Fourth in Twin 125 #2
9	8	Bobby Hillin Jr.	Stavola Brothers Racing	Buick	Fifth in Twin 125 #1
10	83	Lake Speed	Speed Racing	Oldsmobile	Fifth in Twin 125 #2
11	97	Morgan Shepherd	Winkle Motorsports	Buick	Sixth in Twin 125 #1
12	44	Sterling Marlin	Hagan Racing	Oldsmobile	Sixth in Twin 125 #2
13	4	Rick Wilson	Morgan–McClure Motorsports	Oldsmobile	Seventh in Twin 125 #1
14	75	Neil Bonnett	RahMoc Enterprises	Pontiac	Seventh in Twin 125 #2
15	5	Geoff Bodine	Hendrick Motorsports	Chevrolet	Eighth in Twin 125 #1
16	7	Alan Kulwicki	AK Racing	Ford	Eighth in Twin 125 #2
17	14	A. J. Foyt	A. J. Foyt Racing	Oldsmobile	Ninth in Twin 125 #1
18	88	Buddy Baker	Baker–Schiff Racing	Oldsmobile	Ninth in Twin 125 #2
19	55	Phil Parsons	Jackson Bros. Motorsports	Oldsmobile	Tenth in Twin 125 #1
20	33	Harry Gant	Mach 1 Racing	Chevrolet	Tenth in Twin 125 #2
21	21	Kyle Petty	Wood Brothers Racing	Ford	11th in Twin 125 #1
22	68	Derrike Cope	Testa Racing	Ford	11th in Twin 125 #2
23	23	Eddie Bierschwale	B&B Racing	Oldsmobile	12th in Twin 125 #1
24	89	Michael Waltrip	Mueller Brothers Racing	Pontiac	12th in Twin 125 #2
25	73	Phil Barkdoll	Barkdoll Racing	Ford	13th in Twin 125 #1
26	86	Rick Jeffrey	Jeffrey Racing	Chevrolet	13th in Twin 125 #2
27	26	Ricky Rudd	King Racing	Buick	14th in Twin 125 #1
28	95	Trevor Boys	Sadler Brothers Racing	Chevrolet	14th in Twin 125 #2
29	71	Dave Marcis	Marcis Auto Racing	Chevrolet	15th in Twin 125 #1
30	99	Connie Saylor	Ball Motorsports	Chevrolet	15th in Twin 125 #2
31	9	Bill Elliott	Melling Racing	Ford	Speed provisional (192.234)
32	29	Cale Yarborough	Cale Yarborough Motorsports	Oldsmobile	Speed provisional (189.701)
33	31	Brad Teague	Bob Clark Motorsports	Oldsmobile	Speed provisional (189.390)
34	43	Richard Petty	Petty Enterprises	Pontiac	Speed provisional (187.931)
35	22	Steve Moore	Hamby Racing	Chevrolet	Speed provisional (187.825)
36	1	Dale Jarrett	Ellington Racing	Buick	Speed provisional (187.739)
37	52	Jimmy Means	Jimmy Means Racing	Chevrolet	Speed provisional (188.454)
38	6	Mark Martin	Roush Racing	Ford	Speed provisional (188.107)
39	92	Ralph Jones	LC Racing	Ford	Speed provisional (187.837)
40	98	Ed Pimm	Curb Racing	Buick	Speed provisional (187.656)
41	15	Brett Bodine	Bud Moore Engineering	Ford	Owner's points provisional
42	90	Benny Parsons	Donlavey Racing	Ford	Owner's points provisional
Failed to qualify or withdrew
43	67	Buddy Arrington	Arrington Racing	Ford	19th in Duel #1
44	56	Joey Sonntag	Sonntag Racing	Chevrolet	16th in Duel #2
45	01	Mickey Gibbs	Gibbs Racing	Ford	20th in Duel #1
46	30	Michael Waltrip	Bahari Racing	Pontiac	17th in Duel #2
47	34	Donnie Allison	AAG Racing	Oldsmobile	21st in Duel #1
48	10	Ken Bouchard (R)	Whitcomb Racing	Ford	18th in Duel #2
49	63	Jocko Maggiacomo	Linro Motorsports	Chevrolet	22nd in Duel #1
50	39	Blackie Wangerin	Wangerin Racing	Ford	19th in Duel #2
51	24	Bobby Coyle	Gray Racing	Chevrolet	23rd in Duel #1
52	07	Larry Moyer	Stark Racing	Pontiac	20th in Duel #2
53	48	Tony Spanos	Hylton Motorsports	Buick	25th in Duel #1
54	02	Joe Booher	Booher Racing	Pontiac	21st in Duel #2
55	64	Mike Potter	Potter Racing	Chevrolet	26th in Duel #1
56	18	Sarel van der Merwe	Hendrick Motorsports	Chevrolet	25th in Duel #2
57	82	Mark Stahl	Stahl Racing	Ford	27th in Duel #1
58	54	Ronnie Sanders	Gray Racing	Chevrolet	26th in Duel #2
59	2	Ernie Irvan (R)	U.S. Racing	Chevrolet	28th in Duel #1
60	77	Ken Ragan	Ragan Racing	Ford	27th in Duel #2
61	80	Jimmy Horton (R)	S&H Racing	Ford	29th in Duel #1
62	70	J. D. McDuffie	McDuffie Racing	Pontiac	31st in Duel #2
63	74	John Linville	Wawak Racing	Chevrolet	31st in Duel #1
64	0	Delma Cowart	H. L. Waters Racing	Oldsmobile	32nd in Duel #2
65	59	Mark Gibson	Gibson Racing	Pontiac	32nd in Duel #1
66	85	Bobby Gerhart	Bobby Gerhart Racing	Chevrolet	33rd in Duel #2
67	49	Mike Porter	Hylton Motorsports	Chevrolet	33rd in Duel #1
68	03	Dave Pletcher Sr.	Weaver Racing	Ford	34th in Duel #1
69	57	Bobby Wawak	Wawak Racing	Chevrolet	35th in Duel #1
WD	0	Rodney Combs	Inglass Racing	Oldsmobile	Lack of backup car
WD	72	Charlie Rudolph	Rudolph Racing	Pontiac	Lack of backup car
Official Twin 125 Qualifiers results
Official starting lineup

== Race results ==
Fin	St	#	Driver	Team	Make	Laps	Led	Status	Pts	Winnings
1	3	12	Bobby Allison	Stavola Brothers Racing	Buick	200	70	running	185	$202,940
2	2	28	Davey Allison	Ranier-Lundy Racing	Ford	200	2	running	175	$113,760
3	19	55	Phil Parsons	Jackson Bros. Motorsports	Oldsmobile	200	9	running	170	$81,625
4	14	75	Neil Bonnett	RahMoc Enterprises	Pontiac	200	9	running	165	$67,290
5	8	11	Terry Labonte	Junior Johnson & Associates	Chevrolet	200	2	running	160	$62,415
6	1	25	Ken Schrader	Hendrick Motorsports	Chevrolet	200	14	running	155	$72,215
7	5	27	Rusty Wallace	Blue Max Racing	Pontiac	200	4	running	151	$59,990
8	12	44	Sterling Marlin	Hagan Racing	Oldsmobile	200	13	running	147	$43,765
9	18	88	Buddy Baker	Baker–Schiff Racing	Oldsmobile	200	0	running	138	$36,490
10	6	3	Dale Earnhardt	Richard Childress Racing	Chevrolet	200	2	running	139	$52,540
11	4	17	Darrell Waltrip	Hendrick Motorsports	Chevrolet	200	69	running	135	$73,840
12	31	9	Bill Elliott	Melling Racing	Ford	200	0	running	127	$31,015
13	9	8	Bobby Hillin Jr.	Stavola Brothers Racing	Buick	200	0	running	124	$28,320
14	15	5	Geoff Bodine	Hendrick Motorsports	Chevrolet	200	0	running	121	$27,305
15	13	4	Rick Wilson	Morgan–McClure Motorsports	Oldsmobile	200	0	running	118	$23,165
16	36	1	Dale Jarrett	Ellington Racing	Buick	200	0	running	115	$18,845
17	27	26	Ricky Rudd	King Racing	Buick	200	0	running	112	$20,125
18	21	21	Kyle Petty	Wood Brothers Racing	Ford	199	0	running	109	$23,505
19	28	95	Trevor Boys	Sadler Brothers Racing	Chevrolet	199	0	running	106	$15,085
20	29	71	Dave Marcis	Marcis Auto Racing	Chevrolet	198	0	running	103	$18,175
21	33	31	Brad Teague	Bob Clark Motorsports	Oldsmobile	198	0	running	100	$13,570
22	24	89	Michael Waltrip	Mueller Brothers Racing	Pontiac	197	0	running	97	$14,065
23	35	22	Steve Moore	Hamby Racing	Chevrolet	195	0	running	94	$13,810
24	40	98	Ed Pimm	Curb Racing	Buick	191	0	running	91	$11,605
25	37	52	Jimmy Means	Jimmy Means Racing	Chevrolet	191	0	running	88	$14,250
26	39	92	Ralph Jones	LC Racing	Ford	190	0	running	85	$10,595
27	22	68	Derrike Cope	Testa Racing	Ford	183	0	running	82	$15,235
28	23	23	Eddie Bierschwale	B&B Racing	Oldsmobile	181	0	running	79	$12,080
29	20	33	Harry Gant	Mach 1 Racing	Chevrolet	175	1	accident	81	$15,575
30	26	86	Rick Jeffrey	Jeffrey Racing	Chevrolet	174	0	running	73	$11,420
31	42	90	Benny Parsons	Donlavey Racing	Ford	156	0	engine	70	$13,390
32	16	7	Alan Kulwicki	AK Racing	Ford	148	0	running	67	$14,410
33	17	14	A. J. Foyt	A. J. Foyt Racing	Oldsmobile	105	0	accident	64	$11,455
34	34	43	Richard Petty	Petty Enterprises	Pontiac	104	0	accident	61	$11,475
35	41	15	Brett Bodine	Bud Moore Engineering	Ford	104	0	accident	58	$17,870
36	25	73	Phil Barkdoll	Barkdoll Racing	Ford	103	0	accident	55	$10,340
37	10	83	Lake Speed	Speed Racing	Oldsmobile	65	5	engine	57	$12,860
38	32	29	Cale Yarborough	Cale Yarborough Motorsports	Oldsmobile	46	0	accident	49	$8,780
39	30	99	Connie Saylor	Ball Motorsports	Chevrolet	32	0	accident	0	$9,645
40	7	50	Greg Sacks	Dingman Brothers Racing	Pontiac	22	0	engine	43	$12,110
41	38	6	Mark Martin	Roush Racing	Ford	19	0	overheating	40	$7,910
42	11	97	Morgan Shepherd	Winkle Motorsports	Buick	11	0	engine	37	$11,410
Failed to qualify or withdrew
43		67	Buddy Arrington	Arrington Racing	Ford					
44		56	Joey Sonntag	Sonntag Racing	Chevrolet					
45		01	Mickey Gibbs	Gibbs Racing	Ford					
46		30	Michael Waltrip	Bahari Racing	Pontiac					
47		34	Donnie Allison	AAG Racing	Oldsmobile					
48		10	Ken Bouchard (R)	Whitcomb Racing	Ford					
49		63	Jocko Maggiacomo	Linro Motorsports	Chevrolet					
50		39	Blackie Wangerin	Wangerin Racing	Ford					
51		24	Bobby Coyle	Gray Racing	Chevrolet					
52		07	Larry Moyer	Stark Racing	Pontiac					
53		48	Tony Spanos	Hylton Motorsports	Buick					
54		02	Joe Booher	Booher Racing	Pontiac					
55		64	Mike Potter	Potter Racing	Chevrolet					
56		18	Sarel van der Merwe	Hendrick Motorsports	Chevrolet					
57		82	Mark Stahl	Stahl Racing	Ford					
58		54	Ronnie Sanders	Gray Racing	Chevrolet					
59		2	Ernie Irvan (R)	U.S. Racing	Chevrolet					
60		77	Ken Ragan	Ragan Racing	Ford					
61		80	Jimmy Horton (R)	S&H Racing	Ford					
62		70	J. D. McDuffie	McDuffie Racing	Pontiac					
63		74	John Linville	Wawak Racing	Chevrolet					
64		0	Delma Cowart	H. L. Waters Racing	Oldsmobile					
65		59	Mark Gibson	Gibson Racing	Pontiac					
66		85	Bobby Gerhart	Bobby Gerhart Racing	Chevrolet					
67		49	Mike Porter	Hylton Motorsports	Chevrolet					
68		03	Dave Pletcher Sr.	Weaver Racing	Ford					
69		57	Bobby Wawak	Wawak Racing	Chevrolet					
WD		0	Rodney Combs	Inglass Racing	Oldsmobile					
WD		72	Charlie Rudolph	Rudolph Racing	Pontiac					
Official race results

== Standings after the race ==
Drivers' Championship standings

Pos	Driver	Points
1	Bobby Allison	185
2	Davey Allison	175 (-10)
3	Phil Parsons	170 (-15)
4	Neil Bonnett	165 (–20)
5	Terry Labonte	160 (–25)
6	Ken Schrader	155 (–30)
7	Rusty Wallace	151 (–34)
8	Sterling Marlin	147 (–38)
9	Dale Earnhardt	139 (–46)
10	Buddy Baker	138 (–47)
Official driver's standings

- Note: Only the first 10 positions are included for the driver standings.

== Notes ==
Previous race: 1987 Atlanta Journal 500	NASCAR Winston Cup Series; 1988 season	Next race: 1988 Pontiac Excitement 400
