= Bozzano =

Bozzano is a surname. Notable people with this surname include:

- Ernesto Bozzano, also known as Signor Bozzano (1862–1943), Italian medium, parapsychologist and spiritualist
- Giacomo "Mino" Bozzano (1933–2008), former Italian boxer and medalist
- José Alfredo Bozzano Baglietto (1895–1969), Paraguayan military engineer and senior officer of the Army
- Damião de Bozzano (born Pio Giannotti; 1898–1997), Italian Roman Catholic priest and a Capuchin missionary in Brazil
