= John Linville =

American stock car driver

- Born: January 2, 1943; Forsyth County, North Carolina, US
- Died: November 1, 2005 (aged 62); Kernersville, North Carolina, US

NASCAR O'Reilly Auto Parts Series career
- 136 races run over 12 years
- 1992 position: 57th
- Best finish: 17th (1983, 1984, 1986)
- First race: 1982 1982 Daytona 300 (Daytona)
- Last race: 1992 SplitFire 200 (Dover)
Wins	Top tens	Poles
0	3	0

John Paul Linville (January 2, 1943 – November 1, 2005) was an American stock car driver, who raced from 1982 until 1995 in the division that would become the NASCAR O'Reilly Auto Parts Series. Throughout his career, Linville made 136 starts in the series, where he finished in the top-ten three times.

== Racing career ==
=== Early career ===
Linville began racing at the age of twenty, when he entered a race at Bowman Gray Stadium with a car that he purchased for $99. He went on to win the Late Model Sportsman Division Championship at Bowman Gray Stadium in 1968, 1969, and 1971. Additionally, he won the 1970 Limited Sportsmen Championship at State Fairgrounds Speedway in Raleigh, NC.

=== National series ===
In 1982, Linville made his NASCAR Budweiser Late Model Sportsman Series debut at Daytona International Speedway in the Goody's 300 at the age of 39. This was the inaugural race for what would become the NASCAR Xfinity Series. Linville finished 20th in his self-owned No. 62 Pontiac. He competed in a total of eight races during his Rookie campaign, with his best finish coming at Caraway Speedway, where he finished eleventh. Overall, he finished 36th in points.

Linville went on to make several more appearances in the series running nearly full-time from 1983 through 1987. His career best finish came at Martinsville Speedway in the 1987 Nationwise 150, where he finished 8th. His top annual points performances came with a seventeenth-place finish in 1983, 1984, and 1986. His final race attempt came in 1995, when he attempted to qualify for a race at Myrtle Beach Speedway, but failed to do so. In total Linville competed in 136 races, finishing in the top-ten three times.

In addition to the Busch series, Linville attempted to qualify for two NASCAR Cup Series races, but failed to do so. He attempted to qualify for the 1988 Daytona 500 and the Miller Genuine Draft 500 in 1990. Both entries were in the No. 74 car owned by Bobby Wawak.

Linville's final professional race came in the ARCA Bondo/Mar-Hyde Series in September 1998 at Charlotte Motor Speedway. He finished 29th in the No. 90 Ford, owned by Ed Berrier.

== Later life ==
Following his retirement from NASCAR, Linville worked as a general contractor at his self-owned business, Linville Home Builders, Inc., that he began in 1970. He also became involved in Kevin Harvick Incorporated, a race team co-owned by his daughter DeLana and her husband Kevin Harvick.

On November 1, 2005, Linville died after a battle with cancer.

== Family ==
John Linville is the son of Ernest Paul Linville and Floy Phipps Linville, both originally from Forsyth County, North Carolina. He was one of nine children. His younger brother, Richard "Dickie" Linville, also raced in 52 Busch Series races from 1982 until 1986.

Linville married Joyce Griffin on October 14, 1966, at the age of 23. Together they had one daughter DeLana Harvick, who was born on July 7, 1973. DeLana is married to NASCAR Cup Series Champion Kevin Harvick.

== Motorsports career results ==
=== NASCAR ===
(key) (Bold – Pole position awarded by qualifying time. Italics – Pole position earned by points standings or practice time. * – Most laps led.)

==== Winston Cup Series ====
NASCAR Winston Cup Series results
Year	Team	No.	Make	1	2	3	4	5	6	7	8	9	10	11	12	13	14	15	16	17	18	19	20	21	22	23	24	25	26	27	28	29	NSCC	Pts	Ref
1988	Wawak Racing	74	Chevy	DAY; DNQ	RCH	CAR	ATL	DAR	BRI	NWS	MAR	TAL	CLT	DOV	RSD	POC	MCH	DAY	POC	TAL	GLN	MCH	BRI	DAR	RCH	DOV	MAR	CLT	NWS	CAR	PHO	ATL	n/a	0	
1990	Wawak Racing	74	Pontiac	DAY	RCH	CAR	ATL	DAR	BRI	NWS	MAR	TAL	CLT	DOV	SON	POC; DNQ	MCH	DAY	POC	TAL	GLN	MCH	BRI	DAR	RCH	DOV	MAR	NWS	CLT	CAR	PHO	ATL	n/a	0	

===== Daytona 500 =====
Year	Team	Manufacturer	Start	Finish
1988	Wawak Racing	Chevrolet	DNQ	

===== Busch Series =====
NASCAR Busch Series results
Year	Team	No.	Make	1	2	3	4	5	6	7	8	9	10	11	12	13	14	15	16	17	18	19	20	21	22	23	24	25	26	27	28	29	30	31	32	33	34	35	NBGNC	Pts
1982	Linville Racing	62	Pontiac	DAY; 20	RCH	BRI	MAR; DNQ	DAR	HCY	SBO	CRW; 21	RCH	LGY	DOV	HCY	CLT; 39	ASH	HCY	SBO	CAR; 32	CRW; 11	SBO; 24	HCY	LGY	IRP	BRI	HCY	RCH	MAR; 17	CLT; 22	HCY	MAR							36th	746
1983	Linville Racing	62	Pontiac	DAY; 31	RCH	CAR; 36	HCY; 19	MAR; 12	NWS; 23	SBO; 13	GPS; 16	LGY	DOV; 18	BRI 29	CLT; 40	SBO	HCY	ROU	SBO	ROU	CRW; 12	ROU; 11	SBO; 19	HCY	LGY; 20	IRP; 15	GPS; 17	BRI; 12	HCY; 20		RCH; 25	NWS; 20	SBO; 11	MAR; 21	ROU; 13	CLT	HCY; 13	MAR; 22	17th	2,690
1983	Linville Racing	91	Pontiac																											DAR; 28									17th	2,690
1984	Linville Racing	62	Pontiac	DAY; 27	RCH; 14	CAR; 26	HCY; 16	MAR	DAR; 29	ROU; 26	NSV	LGY	MLW; 21				HCY; 19	ROU; 24	SBO	ROU; 22	HCY; 17	IRP; 11	LGY; 13	SBO; 12	BRI; 21	DAR; 31	RCH; 13	NWS	CLT	HCY; 13	CAR	MAR; 12							17th	2,035
1984	Linville Racing	91	Pontiac											DOV; 17																									17th	2,035
1984	Johnny Davis Racing	48	Pontiac												CLT; 18	SBO																							17th	2,035
1985	Buddy Arrington Racing	29	Dodge	DAY	CAR; 23				DAR; 26																														18th	2,046
1985	Linville Racing	62	Pontiac			HCY; 14	BRI	MAR; 13		SBO; 9	LGY; 19		CLT; 18	SBO	HCY	ROU		SBO; 11	LGY; 21	HCY; 17	MLW	BRI; 28	DAR; 19	RCH	NWS; 20	ROU; 19	CLT	HCY; 19		MAR; 11									18th	2,046
1985	Linville Racing	2	Pontiac														IRP; 13																						18th	2,046
1985	Baugess Racing	31	Olds									DOV; 28																											18th	2,046
1985	Johnny Talley Racing	78	Olds																										CAR; 25										18th	2,046
1986	Linville Racing	62	Pontiac	DAY; 30	CAR; 28	HCY; 24	MAR; 12	BRI; 27	DAR; 29	SBO; 22	LGY; 18	JFC; 20	DOV; 20	CLT; 38	SBO; 23	HCY; 17	ROU; 19	IRP; 19	SBO; 15	RAL; 16	OXF DNQ	SBO; 15	HCY; 23	LGY; 23	ROU; 16	BRI; 20	DAR		DOV; 24	MAR; 17	ROU; 23	CLT	CAR; 15	MAR; 21					17th	2,652
1986	American Uniflex	43	Pontiac																									RCH; 29											17th	2,652
1987	Linville Racing	62	Pontiac	DAY	HCY; 23	MAR; 21	DAR; 31	BRI; 17	LGY; 23	SBO; 17			IRP; 22	ROU	JFC	OXF		HCY; 24	RAL; 17	LGY; 18	ROU; 23	BRI	JFC		RCH; 30	DOV; 25	MAR; 8	CLT; DNQ		MAR									22nd	1,871
1987	Graham Racing	93	Pontiac								CLT; 26																												22nd	1,871
1987	Graham Racing	93	Chevy																									CLT; 17											22nd	1,871
1987	Shook Racing	95	Buick									DOV; 19																											22nd	1,871
1987	Reedy Racing	08	Pontiac														SBO; 26																						22nd	1,871
1987	Setzer Racing	86	Buick																					DAR; 42															22nd	1,871
1987	Brolsma Racing	26	Pontiac																										CAR; 35										22nd	1,871
1988	Linville Racing	62	Pontiac	DAY; DNQ	HCY	CAR; 31	MAR	DAR	BRI	LNG	NZH	SBO	NSV	CLT	DOV	ROU	LAN	LVL	MYB	OXF	SBO																		72nd	158
1988	Linville Racing	62	Olds																			HCY; 25	LNG	IRP	ROU	BRI	DAR	RCH	DOV	MAR	CLT	CAR	MAR						72nd	158
1989	Linville Racing	62	Olds	DAY	CAR	MAR	HCY	DAR	BRI	NZH	SBO	LAN	NSV	CLT	DOV	ROU	LVL	VOL	MYB; 18	SBO; 25	HCY; 22	DUB; 22	IRP; 22	ROU	BRI	DAR	RCH	DOV	MAR; 14	CLT; DNQ	CAR	MAR; 27							42nd	691
1990	Linville Racing	62	Chevy	DAY	RCH	CAR	MAR	HCY	DAR	BRI	LAN	SBO	NZH	HCY	CLT	DOV	ROU	VOL	MYB	OXF	NHA	SBO	DUB	IRP	ROU	BRI	DAR	RCH	DOV	MAR	CLT	NHA	CAR	MAR; 10					82nd	134
1991	Linville Racing	62	Chevy	DAY	RCH	CAR	MAR	VOL	HCY	DAR	BRI	LAN	SBO	NZH	CLT	DOV	ROU	HCY	MYB	GLN	OXF	NHA	SBO	DUB	IRP; DNQ	ROU	BRI	DAR	RCH	DOV	CLT	NHA	CAR	MAR; 22					92nd	97
1992	Linville Racing	62	Chevy	DAY	CAR	RCH	ATL	MAR	DAR	BRI	HCY	LAN	DUB	NZH	CLT	DOV	ROU; 17	MYB; 12	GLN	VOL	NHA	TAL	IRP	ROU	MCH	NHA	BRI	DAR	RCH										57th	312
1992	Linville Racing	82	Chevy																											DOV; 30	CLT	MAR	CAR	HCY					57th	312
1995	Linville Racing	62	Chevy	DAY	CAR	RCH	ATL	NSH	DAR	BRI	HCY	NHA	NZH	CLT	DOV	MYB; DNQ	GLN	MLW	TAL	SBO	IRP	MCH	BRI	DAR	RCH	DOV	CLT	CAR	HOM										n/a	0
