= DeLana Harvick =

Former NASCAR team owner

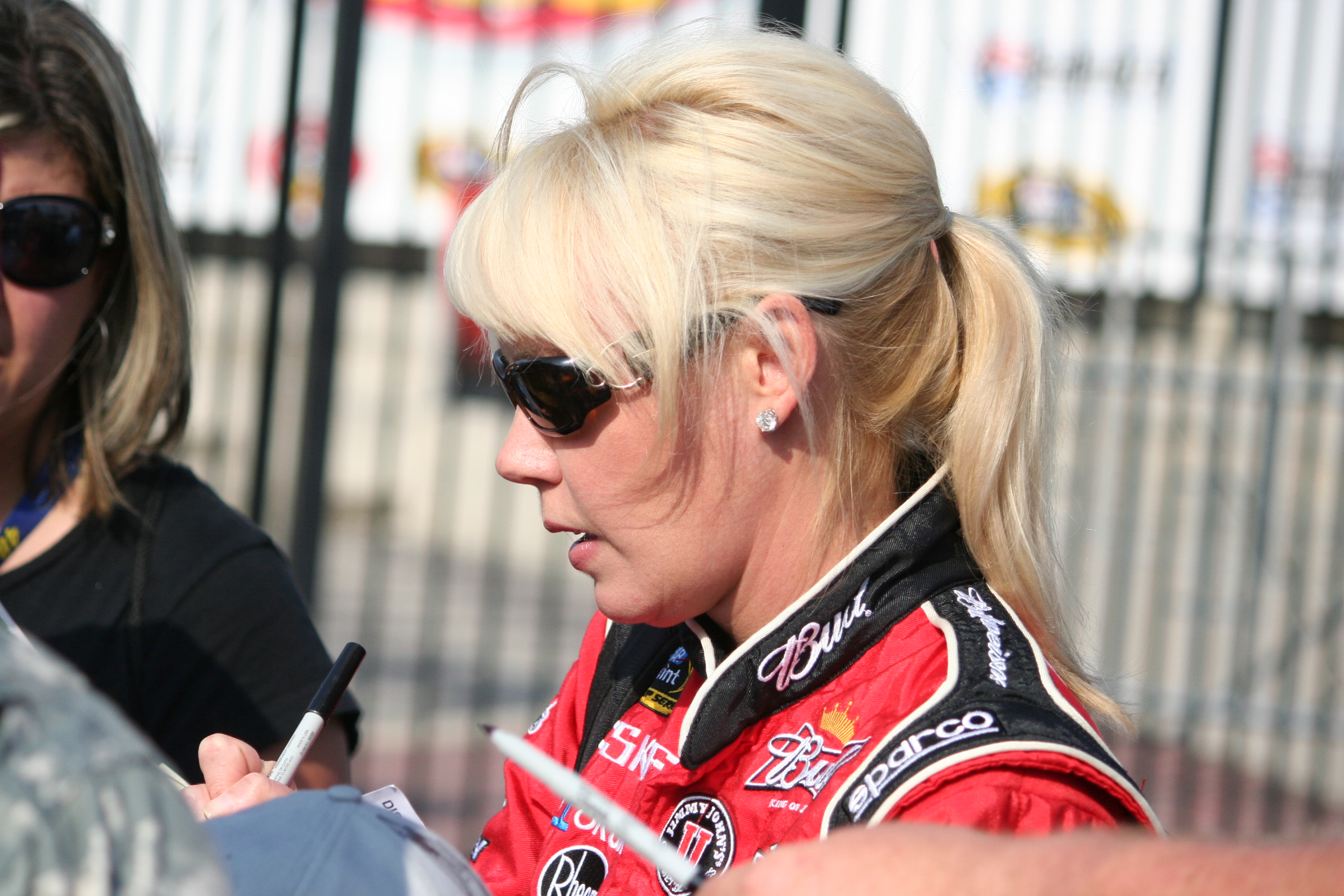
- Harvick at Charlotte Motor Speedway in 2011
- Born: DeLana Lynn Linville; July 7, 1973 (age 53); Kernersville, North Carolina, U.S.
- Years active: 2001–2023
- Known for: Former co-owner/manager of Kevin Harvick Incorporated
- Spouse: Kevin Harvick

DeLana Lynn Harvick (née Linville; born July 7, 1973) is an American former co-owner and manager of Kevin Harvick Incorporated, a racing team in NASCAR's Nationwide and Camping World Truck Series. It was announced in September 2011 that KHI was being sold to Richard Childress, owner of Richard Childress Racing. She is married to NASCAR Cup Series driver Kevin Harvick.

== Personal life ==
A native of Kernersville, North Carolina, Harvick has been around auto racing for practically all her life. Her first visit to a race track came at three weeks old. She is the daughter of former Busch Series driver John Linville and Joyce Linville and grew up around garages and race tracks. After high school, she earned a college degree from the University of North Carolina-Greensboro.

DeLana first met Kevin in 1999 at the Richard Childress Racing Christmas Party. At the time, she was working in public relations for driver Randy LaJoie. DeLana had previously worked in a similar capacity for Jeff Gordon and had even dabbled in race driving herself. DeLana and Kevin were married on February 28, 2001, in Las Vegas, Nevada, shortly after Harvick made his Cup debut. Unlike many NASCAR wives, she can often be seen during a race on top of the pit box wearing a custom-made fire-suit.

The couple have sold their home in Kernersville, North Carolina, and moved to Charlotte with their son, Keelan Paul Harvick (born July 8, 2012), their daughter, Piper Grace Harvick (born December 28, 2017), three dogs, and two cats.

== Kevin Harvick Foundation ==
In 2010, DeLana and Kevin established the Kevin Harvick Foundation (KHF). The foundation supports programs that enrich the lives of children throughout the United States. Programs such as the Kevin Harvick Athletic Scholarship Fund at California State University, Bakersfield and University of North Carolina-Chapel Hill, a camper cabin at Victory Junction Gang Camp, Baptist Children's Homes of NC, Boys & Girls Clubs and Kevin's Krew are aimed at not only improving the quality of life of underprivileged youth in the short term, but to also realize and pursue their dreams in life. The annual "Happy's Classic Golf Tournament", held in Kevin's native Bakersfield, California, and the Kevin Harvick Foundation Pro-Am golf event in Greensboro, North Carolina help fund the foundations activities.
