= 1997 Pennsylvania 500 =

18th race of the 1997 NASCAR Winston Cup Series

Race details
- Race 18 of 32 in the 1997 NASCAR Winston Cup Series
- The 1997 Pennsylvania 500 program cover.
- Date: July 20, 1997
- Location: Long Pond, Pennsylvania, Pocono Raceway
- Course: Permanent racing facility
- Course length: 2.5 miles (4.0 km)
- Distance: 200 laps, 500 mi (804.672 km)
- Average speed: 142.068 miles per hour (228.636 km/h)

Pole position
| Driver | Joe Nemechek | Team SABCO |
- Time: 53.292

Most laps led
| Driver | Dale Jarrett | Robert Yates Racing |
- Laps: 108

Winner
| No. 88 | Dale Jarrett | Robert Yates Racing |

Television in the United States
- Network: TBS
- Announcers: Ken Squier, Buddy Baker, Greg Sacks

Radio in the United States
- Radio: Motor Racing Network

The 1997 Pennsylvania 500 was the 18th stock car race of the 1997 NASCAR Winston Cup Series and the 25th iteration of the event. The race was held on Sunday, July 20, 1997, in Long Pond, Pennsylvania, at Pocono Raceway, a 2.5 miles (4.0 km) triangular permanent course. The race took the scheduled 200 laps to complete. At race's end, Robert Yates Racing driver Dale Jarrett would manage to dominate the majority of the race to take his 11th career NASCAR Winston Cup Series victory and his third victory of the season. To fill out the top three, Hendrick Motorsports driver Jeff Gordon and Roush Racing driver Jeff Burton would finish second and third, respectively.

== Background ==
The layout of Pocono Raceway, the venue where the race was held.

The race was held at Pocono Raceway, which is a three-turn superspeedway located in Long Pond, Pennsylvania. Pocono Raceway is one of a very few NASCAR tracks not owned by either Speedway Motorsports or NASCAR. It is operated by the Igdalsky siblings Brandon, Nicholas, and sister Ashley, and cousins Joseph IV and Chase Mattioli, all of whom are third-generation members of the family-owned Mattco Inc, started by Joseph II and Rose Mattioli.

Outside of the NASCAR races, the track is used throughout the year by Sports Car Club of America (SCCA) and motorcycle clubs as well as racing schools and an IndyCar race. The triangular oval also has three separate infield sections of racetrack – North Course, East Course and South Course. Each of these infield sections use a separate portion of the tri-oval to complete the track. During regular non-race weekends, multiple clubs can use the track by running on different infield sections. Also some of the infield sections can be run in either direction, or multiple infield sections can be put together – such as running the North Course and the South Course and using the tri-oval to connect the two.

=== Entry list ===
- (R) denotes rookie driver.

| # | Driver | Team | Make |
|---|---|---|---|
| 1 | Jerry Nadeau | Precision Products Racing | Pontiac |
| 2 | Rusty Wallace | Penske Racing South | Ford |
| 3 | Dale Earnhardt | Richard Childress Racing | Chevrolet |
| 4 | Sterling Marlin | Morgan–McClure Motorsports | Chevrolet |
| 5 | Terry Labonte | Hendrick Motorsports | Chevrolet |
| 6 | Mark Martin | Roush Racing | Ford |
| 7 | Geoff Bodine | Geoff Bodine Racing | Ford |
| 8 | Hut Stricklin | Stavola Brothers Racing | Ford |
| 10 | Ricky Rudd | Rudd Performance Motorsports | Ford |
| 11 | Brett Bodine | Brett Bodine Racing | Ford |
| 14 | Steve Park | Dale Earnhardt, Inc. | Chevrolet |
| 16 | Ted Musgrave | Roush Racing | Ford |
| 17 | Darrell Waltrip | Darrell Waltrip Motorsports | Chevrolet |
| 18 | Bobby Labonte | Joe Gibbs Racing | Pontiac |
| 21 | Michael Waltrip | Wood Brothers Racing | Ford |
| 22 | Ward Burton | Bill Davis Racing | Pontiac |
| 23 | Jimmy Spencer | Haas-Carter Motorsports | Ford |
| 24 | Jeff Gordon | Hendrick Motorsports | Chevrolet |
| 25 | Ricky Craven | Hendrick Motorsports | Chevrolet |
| 28 | Ernie Irvan | Robert Yates Racing | Ford |
| 29 | Jeff Green (R) | Diamond Ridge Motorsports | Chevrolet |
| 30 | Johnny Benson Jr. | Bahari Racing | Pontiac |
| 31 | Mike Skinner (R) | Richard Childress Racing | Chevrolet |
| 33 | Ken Schrader | Andy Petree Racing | Chevrolet |
| 36 | Derrike Cope | MB2 Motorsports | Pontiac |
| 37 | Jeremy Mayfield | Kranefuss-Haas Racing | Ford |
| 40 | Robby Gordon (R) | Team SABCO | Chevrolet |
| 41 | Steve Grissom | Larry Hedrick Motorsports | Chevrolet |
| 42 | Joe Nemechek | Team SABCO | Chevrolet |
| 43 | Bobby Hamilton | Petty Enterprises | Pontiac |
| 44 | Kyle Petty | Petty Enterprises | Pontiac |
| 46 | Wally Dallenbach Jr. | Team SABCO | Chevrolet |
| 71 | Dave Marcis | Marcis Auto Racing | Chevrolet |
| 75 | Rick Mast | Butch Mock Motorsports | Ford |
| 77 | Morgan Shepherd | Jasper Motorsports | Ford |
| 78 | Bobby Hillin Jr. | Triad Motorsports | Ford |
| 81 | Kenny Wallace | FILMAR Racing | Ford |
| 88 | Dale Jarrett | Robert Yates Racing | Ford |
| 90 | Dick Trickle | Donlavey Racing | Ford |
| 91 | Greg Sacks | LJ Racing | Chevrolet |
| 94 | Bill Elliott | Bill Elliott Racing | Ford |
| 96 | David Green (R) | American Equipment Racing | Chevrolet |
| 97 | Chad Little | Mark Rypien Motorsports | Pontiac |
| 98 | John Andretti | Cale Yarborough Motorsports | Ford |
| 99 | Jeff Burton | Roush Racing | Ford |

== Qualifying ==
Qualifying was split into two rounds. The first round was held on Friday, July 18, at 3:00 PM EST. Each driver would have one lap to set a time. During the first round, the top 25 drivers in the round would be guaranteed a starting spot in the race. If a driver was not able to guarantee a spot in the first round, they had the option to scrub their time from the first round and try and run a faster lap time in a second round qualifying run, held on Saturday, July 19, at 11:30 AM EST. As with the first round, each driver would have one lap to set a time. Positions 26-38 would be decided on time, and depending on who needed it, the 39th thru either the 42nd, 43rd, or 44th position would be based on provisionals. Four spots are awarded by the use of provisionals based on owner's points. The fifth is awarded to a past champion who has not otherwise qualified for the race. If no past champion needs the provisional, the field would be limited to 42 cars. If a champion needed it, the field would expand to 43 cars. If the race was a companion race with the NASCAR Winston West Series, four spots would be determined by NASCAR Winston Cup Series provisionals, while the final two spots would be given to teams in the Winston West Series, leaving the field at 44 cars.

Joe Nemechek, driving for Team SABCO, would win the pole, setting a time of 53.292 and an average speed of 168.881 miles per hour (271.788 km/h).

Three drivers would fail to qualify: Bobby Hillin Jr., Steve Park, and Greg Sacks.

=== Full qualifying results ===
| Pos. | # | Driver | Team | Make | Time | Speed |
|---|---|---|---|---|---|---|
| 1 | 42 | Joe Nemechek | Team SABCO | Chevrolet | 53.292 | 168.881 |
| 2 | 28 | Ernie Irvan | Robert Yates Racing | Ford | 53.424 | 168.464 |
| 3 | 46 | Wally Dallenbach Jr. | Team SABCO | Chevrolet | 53.537 | 168.108 |
| 4 | 88 | Dale Jarrett | Robert Yates Racing | Ford | 53.647 | 167.763 |
| 5 | 3 | Dale Earnhardt | Richard Childress Racing | Chevrolet | 53.651 | 167.751 |
| 6 | 24 | Jeff Gordon | Hendrick Motorsports | Chevrolet | 53.688 | 167.635 |
| 7 | 33 | Ken Schrader | Andy Petree Racing | Chevrolet | 53.726 | 167.517 |
| 8 | 29 | Jeff Green (R) | Diamond Ridge Motorsports | Chevrolet | 53.738 | 167.479 |
| 9 | 6 | Mark Martin | Roush Racing | Ford | 53.747 | 167.451 |
| 10 | 18 | Bobby Labonte | Joe Gibbs Racing | Pontiac | 53.778 | 167.355 |
| 11 | 31 | Mike Skinner (R) | Richard Childress Racing | Chevrolet | 53.805 | 167.271 |
| 12 | 41 | Steve Grissom | Larry Hedrick Motorsports | Chevrolet | 53.807 | 167.264 |
| 13 | 98 | John Andretti | Cale Yarborough Motorsports | Ford | 53.808 | 167.261 |
| 14 | 23 | Jimmy Spencer | Travis Carter Enterprises | Ford | 53.838 | 167.168 |
| 15 | 94 | Bill Elliott | Bill Elliott Racing | Ford | 53.878 | 167.044 |
| 16 | 17 | Darrell Waltrip | Darrell Waltrip Motorsports | Chevrolet | 53.957 | 166.799 |
| 17 | 37 | Jeremy Mayfield | Kranefuss-Haas Racing | Ford | 54.047 | 166.522 |
| 18 | 81 | Kenny Wallace | FILMAR Racing | Ford | 54.077 | 166.429 |
| 19 | 10 | Ricky Rudd | Rudd Performance Motorsports | Ford | 54.111 | 166.325 |
| 20 | 99 | Jeff Burton | Roush Racing | Ford | 54.138 | 166.242 |
| 21 | 5 | Terry Labonte | Hendrick Motorsports | Chevrolet | 54.140 | 166.236 |
| 22 | 16 | Ted Musgrave | Roush Racing | Ford | 54.140 | 166.236 |
| 23 | 4 | Sterling Marlin | Morgan–McClure Motorsports | Chevrolet | 54.157 | 166.184 |
| 24 | 8 | Hut Stricklin | Stavola Brothers Racing | Ford | 54.181 | 166.110 |
| 25 | 21 | Michael Waltrip | Wood Brothers Racing | Ford | 54.191 | 166.079 |
| 26 | 75 | Rick Mast | Butch Mock Motorsports | Ford | 53.924 | 166.902 |
| 27 | 90 | Dick Trickle | Donlavey Racing | Ford | 53.933 | 166.874 |
| 28 | 43 | Bobby Hamilton | Petty Enterprises | Pontiac | 53.944 | 166.840 |
| 29 | 36 | Derrike Cope | MB2 Motorsports | Pontiac | 53.948 | 166.827 |
| 30 | 40 | Robby Gordon | Team SABCO | Chevrolet | 53.978 | 166.735 |
| 31 | 11 | Brett Bodine | Brett Bodine Racing | Ford | 54.010 | 166.636 |
| 32 | 22 | Ward Burton | Bill Davis Racing | Pontiac | 54.032 | 166.568 |
| 33 | 77 | Morgan Shepherd | Jasper Motorsports | Ford | 54.069 | 166.454 |
| 34 | 44 | Kyle Petty | Petty Enterprises | Pontiac | 54.101 | 166.356 |
| 35 | 1 | Jerry Nadeau | Precision Products Racing | Pontiac | 54.202 | 166.046 |
| 36 | 97 | Chad Little | Mark Rypien Motorsports | Pontiac | 54.229 | 165.963 |
| 37 | 25 | Ricky Craven | Hendrick Motorsports | Chevrolet | 54.233 | 165.951 |
| 38 | 7 | Geoff Bodine | Geoff Bodine Racing | Ford | 54.273 | 165.828 |
Provisionals
| 39 | 2 | Rusty Wallace | Penske Racing South | Ford | -* | -* |
| 40 | 30 | Johnny Benson Jr. | Bahari Racing | Pontiac | -* | -* |
| 41 | 71 | Dave Marcis (R) | Marcis Auto Racing | Chevrolet | -* | -* |
| 42 | 96 | David Green (R) | American Equipment Racing | Chevrolet | -* | -* |
Failed to qualify
| 43 | 78 | Bobby Hillin Jr. | Triad Motorsports | Ford | -* | -* |
| 44 | 14 | Steve Park | Dale Earnhardt, Inc. | Chevrolet | -* | -* |
| 45 | 91 | Greg Sacks | LJ Racing | Chevrolet | -* | -* |
Official qualifying results

== Race results ==
| Fin | St | # | Driver | Team | Make | Laps | Led | Status | Pts | Winnings |
|---|---|---|---|---|---|---|---|---|---|---|
| 1 | 4 | 88 | Dale Jarrett | Robert Yates Racing | Ford | 200 | 108 | running | 185 | $104,570 |
| 2 | 6 | 24 | Jeff Gordon | Hendrick Motorsports | Chevrolet | 200 | 53 | running | 175 | $56,745 |
| 3 | 20 | 99 | Jeff Burton | Roush Racing | Ford | 200 | 2 | running | 170 | $44,195 |
| 4 | 22 | 16 | Ted Musgrave | Roush Racing | Ford | 200 | 8 | running | 165 | $39,070 |
| 5 | 9 | 6 | Mark Martin | Roush Racing | Ford | 200 | 1 | running | 160 | $36,040 |
| 6 | 11 | 31 | Mike Skinner (R) | Richard Childress Racing | Chevrolet | 200 | 0 | running | 150 | $21,690 |
| 7 | 14 | 23 | Jimmy Spencer | Travis Carter Enterprises | Ford | 200 | 1 | running | 151 | $30,890 |
| 8 | 34 | 44 | Kyle Petty | Petty Enterprises | Pontiac | 200 | 4 | running | 147 | $19,090 |
| 9 | 17 | 37 | Jeremy Mayfield | Kranefuss-Haas Racing | Ford | 200 | 0 | running | 138 | $18,490 |
| 10 | 15 | 94 | Bill Elliott | Bill Elliott Racing | Ford | 200 | 2 | running | 139 | $28,240 |
| 11 | 10 | 18 | Bobby Labonte | Joe Gibbs Racing | Pontiac | 200 | 0 | running | 130 | $28,340 |
| 12 | 5 | 3 | Dale Earnhardt | Richard Childress Racing | Chevrolet | 200 | 2 | running | 132 | $29,490 |
| 13 | 40 | 30 | Johnny Benson Jr. | Bahari Racing | Pontiac | 200 | 1 | running | 129 | $25,990 |
| 14 | 7 | 33 | Ken Schrader | Andy Petree Racing | Chevrolet | 200 | 0 | running | 121 | $23,690 |
| 15 | 32 | 22 | Ward Burton | Bill Davis Racing | Pontiac | 200 | 0 | running | 118 | $24,490 |
| 16 | 29 | 36 | Derrike Cope | MB2 Motorsports | Pontiac | 200 | 2 | running | 120 | $16,090 |
| 17 | 38 | 7 | Geoff Bodine | Geoff Bodine Racing | Ford | 200 | 2 | running | 117 | $22,890 |
| 18 | 37 | 25 | Ricky Craven | Hendrick Motorsports | Chevrolet | 200 | 0 | running | 109 | $22,690 |
| 19 | 27 | 90 | Dick Trickle | Donlavey Racing | Ford | 199 | 0 | running | 106 | $15,440 |
| 20 | 23 | 4 | Sterling Marlin | Morgan–McClure Motorsports | Chevrolet | 199 | 0 | running | 103 | $29,765 |
| 21 | 1 | 42 | Joe Nemechek | Team SABCO | Chevrolet | 199 | 11 | running | 105 | $22,715 |
| 22 | 25 | 21 | Michael Waltrip | Wood Brothers Racing | Ford | 199 | 0 | running | 97 | $21,790 |
| 23 | 24 | 8 | Hut Stricklin | Stavola Brothers Racing | Ford | 199 | 0 | running | 94 | $21,565 |
| 24 | 13 | 98 | John Andretti | Cale Yarborough Motorsports | Ford | 199 | 0 | running | 91 | $21,415 |
| 25 | 26 | 75 | Rick Mast | Butch Mock Motorsports | Ford | 199 | 0 | running | 88 | $21,840 |
| 26 | 16 | 17 | Darrell Waltrip | Darrell Waltrip Motorsports | Chevrolet | 199 | 0 | running | 85 | $20,790 |
| 27 | 33 | 77 | Morgan Shepherd | Jasper Motorsports | Ford | 199 | 0 | running | 82 | $11,240 |
| 28 | 36 | 97 | Chad Little | Mark Rypien Motorsports | Pontiac | 199 | 0 | running | 79 | $11,190 |
| 29 | 31 | 11 | Brett Bodine | Brett Bodine Racing | Ford | 198 | 0 | running | 76 | $18,115 |
| 30 | 12 | 41 | Steve Grissom | Larry Hedrick Motorsports | Chevrolet | 198 | 0 | running | 73 | $18,065 |
| 31 | 8 | 29 | Jeff Green (R) | Diamond Ridge Motorsports | Chevrolet | 197 | 0 | running | 70 | $11,015 |
| 32 | 28 | 43 | Bobby Hamilton | Petty Enterprises | Pontiac | 197 | 0 | running | 67 | $25,965 |
| 33 | 35 | 1 | Jerry Nadeau | Precision Products Racing | Pontiac | 197 | 0 | running | 64 | $17,865 |
| 34 | 18 | 81 | Kenny Wallace | FILMAR Racing | Ford | 195 | 0 | running | 61 | $17,790 |
| 35 | 21 | 5 | Terry Labonte | Hendrick Motorsports | Chevrolet | 193 | 0 | running | 58 | $33,815 |
| 36 | 19 | 10 | Ricky Rudd | Rudd Performance Motorsports | Ford | 192 | 0 | engine | 55 | $25,640 |
| 37 | 39 | 2 | Rusty Wallace | Penske Racing South | Ford | 174 | 0 | engine | 52 | $27,575 |
| 38 | 3 | 46 | Wally Dallenbach Jr. | Team SABCO | Chevrolet | 158 | 0 | engine | 49 | $10,450 |
| 39 | 42 | 96 | David Green (R) | American Equipment Racing | Chevrolet | 157 | 0 | engine | 46 | $10,450 |
| 40 | 2 | 28 | Ernie Irvan | Robert Yates Racing | Ford | 136 | 3 | crash | 48 | $25,450 |
| 41 | 41 | 71 | Dave Marcis (R) | Marcis Auto Racing | Chevrolet | 35 | 0 | engine | 40 | $10,450 |
| 42 | 30 | 40 | Robby Gordon | Team SABCO | Chevrolet | 0 | 0 | engine | 37 | $17,450 |
Official race results

| Previous race: 1997 Jiffy Lube 300 | NASCAR Winston Cup Series; 1997 season | Next race: 1997 Brickyard 400 |
