= 1997 Pocono 500 =

13th race of the 1997 NASCAR Winston Cup Series

Race details
- Race 13 of 32 in the 1997 NASCAR Winston Cup Series
- The 1997 Pocono 500 program cover.
- Date: June 8, 1997
- Location: Long Pond, Pennsylvania, Pocono Raceway
- Course: Permanent racing facility
- Course length: 2.5 miles (4.0 km)
- Distance: 200 laps, 500 mi (804.672 km)
- Average speed: 139.828 miles per hour (225.031 km/h)

Pole position
Driver	Bobby Hamilton	Petty Enterprises
- Time: 53.543

Most laps led
Driver	Ward Burton	Bill Davis Racing
- Laps: 60

Winner
No. 24	Jeff Gordon	Hendrick Motorsports

Television in the United States
- Network: TNN
- Announcers: Eli Gold, Buddy Baker, Dick Berggren

Radio in the United States
- Radio: Motor Racing Network

The 1997 Pocono 500 was the 13th stock car race of the 1997 NASCAR Winston Cup Series and the 16th iteration of the event. The race was held on Sunday, June 8, 1997, in Long Pond, Pennsylvania, at Pocono Raceway, a 2.5 miles (4.0 km) triangular permanent course. The race took the scheduled 200 laps to complete. At race's end, Hendrick Motorsports driver Jeff Gordon would manage to dominate the late stages of the race, taking advantage of a mechanical failure from leader Ward Burton to take his 25th career NASCAR Winston Cup Series victory and his sixth victory of the season. To fill out the top three, Roush Racing driver Jeff Burton and Robert Yates Racing driver Dale Jarrett would finish second and third, respectively.

== Background ==
The layout of Pocono Raceway, the venue where the race was held.

The race was held at Pocono Raceway, which is a three-turn superspeedway located in Long Pond, Pennsylvania. Pocono Raceway is one of a very few NASCAR tracks not owned by either Speedway Motorsports or NASCAR. It is operated by the Igdalsky siblings Brandon, Nicholas, and sister Ashley, and cousins Joseph IV and Chase Mattioli, all of whom are third-generation members of the family-owned Mattco Inc, started by Joseph II and Rose Mattioli.

Outside of the NASCAR races, the track is used throughout the year by Sports Car Club of America (SCCA) and motorcycle clubs as well as racing schools and an IndyCar race. The triangular oval also has three separate infield sections of racetrack – North Course, East Course and South Course. Each of these infield sections use a separate portion of the tri-oval to complete the track. During regular non-race weekends, multiple clubs can use the track by running on different infield sections. Also some of the infield sections can be run in either direction, or multiple infield sections can be put together – such as running the North Course and the South Course and using the tri-oval to connect the two.

=== Entry list ===
- (R) denotes rookie driver.

#	Driver	Team	Make
1	Morgan Shepherd	Precision Products Racing	Pontiac
2	Rusty Wallace	Penske Racing South	Ford
3	Dale Earnhardt	Richard Childress Racing	Chevrolet
4	Sterling Marlin	Morgan–McClure Motorsports	Chevrolet
5	Terry Labonte	Hendrick Motorsports	Chevrolet
6	Mark Martin	Roush Racing	Ford
7	Geoff Bodine	Mattei Motorsports	Ford
8	Hut Stricklin	Stavola Brothers Racing	Ford
10	Ricky Rudd	Rudd Performance Motorsports	Ford
11	Brett Bodine	Brett Bodine Racing	Ford
16	Ted Musgrave	Roush Racing	Ford
17	Darrell Waltrip	Darrell Waltrip Motorsports	Chevrolet
18	Bobby Labonte	Joe Gibbs Racing	Pontiac
19	Gary Bradberry	TriStar Motorsports	Ford
21	Michael Waltrip	Wood Brothers Racing	Ford
22	Ward Burton	Bill Davis Racing	Pontiac
23	Jimmy Spencer	Haas-Carter Motorsports	Ford
24	Jeff Gordon	Hendrick Motorsports	Chevrolet
25	Ricky Craven	Hendrick Motorsports	Chevrolet
28	Ernie Irvan	Robert Yates Racing	Ford
29	Jeff Green (R)	Diamond Ridge Motorsports	Chevrolet
30	Johnny Benson Jr.	Bahari Racing	Pontiac
31	Mike Skinner (R)	Richard Childress Racing	Chevrolet
33	Ken Schrader	Andy Petree Racing	Chevrolet
36	Derrike Cope	MB2 Motorsports	Pontiac
37	Jeremy Mayfield	Kranefuss-Haas Racing	Ford
40	Greg Sacks	Team SABCO	Chevrolet
41	Steve Grissom	Larry Hedrick Motorsports	Chevrolet
42	Joe Nemechek	Team SABCO	Chevrolet
43	Bobby Hamilton	Petty Enterprises	Pontiac
44	Kyle Petty	Petty Enterprises	Pontiac
46	Wally Dallenbach Jr.	Team SABCO	Chevrolet
71	Dave Marcis	Marcis Auto Racing	Chevrolet
75	Rick Mast	Butch Mock Motorsports	Ford
77	Bobby Hillin Jr.	Jasper Motorsports	Ford
78	Billy Standridge	Triad Motorsports	Ford
81	Kenny Wallace	FILMAR Racing	Ford
88	Dale Jarrett	Robert Yates Racing	Ford
90	Dick Trickle	Donlavey Racing	Ford
91	Mike Wallace	LJ Racing	Chevrolet
94	Bill Elliott	Bill Elliott Racing	Ford
96	David Green (R)	American Equipment Racing	Chevrolet
97	Chad Little	Mark Rypien Motorsports	Pontiac
98	John Andretti	Cale Yarborough Motorsports	Ford
99	Jeff Burton	Roush Racing	Ford

== Qualifying ==
Qualifying was split into two rounds. The first round was held on Friday, June 6, at 3:00 PM EST. Each driver would have one lap to set a time. During the first round, the top 25 drivers in the round would be guaranteed a starting spot in the race. If a driver was not able to guarantee a spot in the first round, they had the option to scrub their time from the first round and try and run a faster lap time in a second round qualifying run, held on Saturday, June 7, at 11:30 AM EST. As with the first round, each driver would have one lap to set a time. Positions 26-38 would be decided on time, and depending on who needed it, the 39th thru either the 42nd, 43rd, or 44th position would be based on provisionals. Four spots are awarded by the use of provisionals based on owner's points. The fifth is awarded to a past champion who has not otherwise qualified for the race. If no past champion needs the provisional, the field would be limited to 42 cars. If a champion needed it, the field would expand to 43 cars. If the race was a companion race with the NASCAR Winston West Series, four spots would be determined by NASCAR Winston Cup Series provisionals, while the final two spots would be given to teams in the Winston West Series, leaving the field at 44 cars.

Bobby Hamilton, driving for Petty Enterprises, would win the pole, setting a time of 53.543 and an average speed of 168.089 miles per hour (270.513 km/h).

Three drivers would fail to qualify: Chad Little, Billy Standridge, and Dave Marcis.

=== Full qualifying results ===
Pos.	#	Driver	Team	Make	Time	Speed
1	43	Bobby Hamilton	Petty Enterprises	Pontiac	53.543	168.089
2	88	Dale Jarrett	Robert Yates Racing	Ford	53.563	168.026
3	22	Ward Burton	Bill Davis Racing	Pontiac	53.729	167.507
4	40	Greg Sacks	Team SABCO	Chevrolet	53.741	167.470
5	94	Bill Elliott	Bill Elliott Racing	Ford	53.769	167.383
6	10	Ricky Rudd	Rudd Performance Motorsports	Ford	53.775	167.364
7	5	Terry Labonte	Hendrick Motorsports	Chevrolet	53.807	167.264
8	17	Darrell Waltrip	Darrell Waltrip Motorsports	Chevrolet	53.808	167.261
9	98	John Andretti	Cale Yarborough Motorsports	Ford	53.813	167.246
10	75	Rick Mast	Butch Mock Motorsports	Ford	53.844	167.150
11	24	Jeff Gordon	Hendrick Motorsports	Chevrolet	53.895	166.991
12	3	Dale Earnhardt	Richard Childress Racing	Chevrolet	53.983	166.719
13	46	Wally Dallenbach Jr.	Team SABCO	Chevrolet	53.997	166.676
14	6	Mark Martin	Roush Racing	Ford	54.027	166.583
15	8	Hut Stricklin	Stavola Brothers Racing	Ford	54.039	166.546
16	2	Rusty Wallace	Penske Racing South	Ford	54.049	166.516
17	91	Mike Wallace	LJ Racing	Chevrolet	54.064	166.469
18	99	Jeff Burton	Roush Racing	Ford	54.072	166.445
19	28	Ernie Irvan	Robert Yates Racing	Ford	54.093	166.380
20	1	Morgan Shepherd	Precision Products Racing	Pontiac	54.116	166.309
21	30	Johnny Benson Jr.	Bahari Racing	Pontiac	54.149	166.208
22	25	Ricky Craven	Hendrick Motorsports	Chevrolet	54.160	166.174
23	18	Bobby Labonte	Joe Gibbs Racing	Pontiac	54.163	166.165
24	7	Geoff Bodine	Geoff Bodine Racing	Ford	54.165	166.159
25	96	David Green (R)	American Equipment Racing	Chevrolet	54.169	166.147
26	42	Joe Nemechek	Team SABCO	Chevrolet	53.685	167.645
27	37	Jeremy Mayfield	Kranefuss-Haas Racing	Ford	53.795	167.302
28	4	Sterling Marlin	Morgan–McClure Motorsports	Chevrolet	53.982	166.722
29	29	Jeff Green (R)	Diamond Ridge Motorsports	Chevrolet	53.989	166.701
30	81	Kenny Wallace	FILMAR Racing	Ford	53.999	166.670
31	16	Ted Musgrave	Roush Racing	Ford	54.019	166.608
32	21	Michael Waltrip	Wood Brothers Racing	Ford	54.022	166.599
33	77	Bobby Hillin Jr.	Jasper Motorsports	Ford	54.024	166.593
34	23	Jimmy Spencer	Travis Carter Enterprises	Ford	54.039	166.546
35	41	Steve Grissom	Larry Hedrick Motorsports	Chevrolet	54.067	166.460
36	19	Gary Bradberry	TriStar Motorsports	Ford	54.099	166.362
37	11	Brett Bodine	Brett Bodine Racing	Ford	54.131	166.263
38	36	Derrike Cope	MB2 Motorsports	Pontiac	54.170	166.144
Provisionals
39	33	Ken Schrader	Andy Petree Racing	Chevrolet	-*	-*
40	44	Kyle Petty	Petty Enterprises	Pontiac	-*	-*
41	31	Mike Skinner (R)	Richard Childress Racing	Chevrolet	-*	-*
42	90	Dick Trickle	Donlavey Racing	Ford	-*	-*
Failed to qualify
43	97	Chad Little	Mark Rypien Motorsports	Pontiac	-*	-*
44	78	Billy Standridge	Triad Motorsports	Ford	-*	-*
45	71	Dave Marcis	Marcis Auto Racing	Chevrolet	-*	-*
Official qualifying results

== Race results ==
Fin	St	#	Driver	Team	Make	Laps	Led	Status	Pts	Winnings
1	11	24	Jeff Gordon	Hendrick Motorsports	Chevrolet	200	59	running	180	$166,080
2	18	99	Jeff Burton	Roush Racing	Ford	200	0	running	170	$52,550
3	2	88	Dale Jarrett	Robert Yates Racing	Ford	200	5	running	170	$53,245
4	14	6	Mark Martin	Roush Racing	Ford	200	0	running	160	$39,620
5	27	37	Jeremy Mayfield	Kranefuss-Haas Racing	Ford	200	2	running	160	$33,070
6	31	16	Ted Musgrave	Roush Racing	Ford	200	11	running	155	$28,875
7	8	17	Darrell Waltrip	Darrell Waltrip Motorsports	Chevrolet	200	9	running	151	$30,775
8	24	7	Geoff Bodine	Geoff Bodine Racing	Ford	200	2	running	147	$25,975
9	7	5	Terry Labonte	Hendrick Motorsports	Chevrolet	200	3	running	143	$35,675
10	12	3	Dale Earnhardt	Richard Childress Racing	Chevrolet	200	0	running	134	$34,025
11	38	36	Derrike Cope	MB2 Motorsports	Pontiac	200	0	running	130	$19,525
12	20	1	Morgan Shepherd	Precision Products Racing	Pontiac	200	0	running	127	$24,175
13	32	21	Michael Waltrip	Wood Brothers Racing	Ford	200	0	running	124	$23,875
14	40	44	Kyle Petty	Petty Enterprises	Pontiac	200	0	running	121	$16,575
15	28	4	Sterling Marlin	Morgan–McClure Motorsports	Chevrolet	200	0	running	118	$30,225
16	22	25	Ricky Craven	Hendrick Motorsports	Chevrolet	200	1	running	120	$23,075
17	13	46	Wally Dallenbach Jr.	Team SABCO	Chevrolet	200	0	running	112	$12,175
18	35	41	Steve Grissom	Larry Hedrick Motorsports	Chevrolet	200	0	running	109	$22,775
19	34	23	Jimmy Spencer	Travis Carter Enterprises	Ford	200	0	running	106	$22,525
20	10	75	Rick Mast	Butch Mock Motorsports	Ford	200	0	running	103	$24,750
21	6	10	Ricky Rudd	Rudd Performance Motorsports	Ford	199	0	running	100	$26,505
22	16	2	Rusty Wallace	Penske Racing South	Ford	199	0	running	97	$28,405
23	39	33	Ken Schrader	Andy Petree Racing	Chevrolet	199	0	running	94	$21,680
24	15	8	Hut Stricklin	Stavola Brothers Racing	Ford	199	0	running	91	$21,530
25	37	11	Brett Bodine	Brett Bodine Racing	Ford	199	2	running	93	$21,605
26	42	90	Dick Trickle	Donlavey Racing	Ford	199	0	running	85	$14,205
27	21	30	Johnny Benson Jr.	Bahari Racing	Pontiac	198	0	running	82	$21,055
28	25	96	David Green (R)	American Equipment Racing	Chevrolet	198	0	running	79	$12,005
29	19	28	Ernie Irvan	Robert Yates Racing	Ford	197	0	running	76	$25,930
30	17	91	Mike Wallace	LJ Racing	Chevrolet	197	0	running	73	$10,880
31	23	18	Bobby Labonte	Joe Gibbs Racing	Pontiac	197	0	running	70	$25,830
32	5	94	Bill Elliott	Bill Elliott Racing	Ford	196	6	running	72	$20,780
33	36	19	Gary Bradberry	TriStar Motorsports	Ford	196	0	running	64	$10,730
34	30	81	Kenny Wallace	FILMAR Racing	Ford	196	0	running	61	$20,105
35	29	29	Jeff Green (R)	Diamond Ridge Motorsports	Chevrolet	189	15	engine	63	$20,530
36	26	42	Joe Nemechek	Team SABCO	Chevrolet	166	0	engine	55	$10,955
37	33	77	Bobby Hillin Jr.	Jasper Motorsports	Ford	146	0	running	52	$10,390
38	3	22	Ward Burton	Bill Davis Racing	Pontiac	141	60	engine	59	$18,765
39	1	43	Bobby Hamilton	Petty Enterprises	Pontiac	129	22	crash	51	$27,990
40	9	98	John Andretti	Cale Yarborough Motorsports	Ford	121	1	engine	48	$17,265
41	41	31	Mike Skinner (R)	Richard Childress Racing	Chevrolet	79	2	engine	45	$10,265
42	4	40	Greg Sacks	Team SABCO	Chevrolet	8	0	crash	37	$17,265
Official race results

Previous race: 1997 Miller 500	NASCAR Winston Cup Series; 1997 season	Next race: 1997 Miller 400
