= 1997 Miller 500 =

12th race of the 1997 NASCAR Winston Cup Series

Race details
- Race 12 of 32 in the 1997 NASCAR Winston Cup Series
- The 1997 Miller 500 program cover, featuring Rusty Wallace and Miles the Monster. Artwork by NASCAR artist Sam Bass.
- Date: June 1, 1997
- Official name: 29th Annual Miller 500
- Location: Dover, Delaware, Dover Downs International Speedway
- Course: Permanent racing facility
- Course length: 1 miles (1.6 km)
- Distance: 500 laps, 500 mi (804.672 km)
- Average speed: 114.635 miles per hour (184.487 km/h)

Pole position
Driver	Bobby Labonte	Joe Gibbs Racing
- Time: 23.562

Most laps led
Driver	Dale Jarrett	Robert Yates Racing
- Laps: 255

Winner
No. 10	Ricky Rudd	Rudd Performance Motorsports

Television in the United States
- Network: TNN
- Announcers: Eli Gold, Dick Berggren, Buddy Baker

Radio in the United States
- Radio: Motor Racing Network

The 1997 Miller 500 was the 12th stock car race of the 1997 NASCAR Winston Cup Series and the 29th iteration of the event. The race was held on Sunday, June 1, 1997, in Dover, Delaware at Dover Downs International Speedway, a 1-mile (1.6 km) permanent oval-shaped racetrack. The race took the scheduled 500 laps to complete. In the final laps of the race, Ricky Rudd, driving for his owner-driver team Rudd Performance Motorsports, would manage to take advantage of mishaps from numerous different dominant cars to take his 18th career NASCAR Winston Cup Series victory. To fill out the top three, Mark Martin and Jeff Burton, both drivers for Roush Racing, would finish second and third, respectively.

== Background ==
The layout of Dover International Speedway, the venue where the race was held.

Dover International Speedway is an oval race track in Dover, Delaware. The track features one layout, a 1-mile (1.6 km) concrete oval, with 24° banking in the turns and 9° banking on the straights. The speedway is owned and operated by Speedway Motorsports.

The track, nicknamed "The Monster Mile", was built in 1969 by Melvin Joseph of Melvin L. Joseph Construction Company, Inc., with an asphalt surface, but was replaced with concrete in 1995. Six years later in 2001, the track's capacity moved to 135,000 seats, making the track have the largest capacity of sports venue in the mid-Atlantic. In 2002, the name changed to Dover International Speedway from Dover Downs International Speedway after Dover Downs Gaming and Entertainment split, making Dover Motorsports. From 2007 to 2009, the speedway worked on an improvement project called "The Monster Makeover", which expanded facilities at the track and beautified the track. After the 2014 season, the track's capacity was reduced to 95,500 seats.

=== Entry list ===
- (R) denotes rookie driver.

#	Driver	Team	Make
1	Morgan Shepherd	Precision Products Racing	Pontiac
2	Rusty Wallace	Penske Racing South	Ford
3	Dale Earnhardt	Richard Childress Racing	Chevrolet
4	Sterling Marlin	Morgan–McClure Motorsports	Chevrolet
5	Terry Labonte	Hendrick Motorsports	Chevrolet
6	Mark Martin	Roush Racing	Ford
7	Geoff Bodine	Mattei Motorsports	Ford
8	Hut Stricklin	Stavola Brothers Racing	Ford
10	Ricky Rudd	Rudd Performance Motorsports	Ford
11	Brett Bodine	Brett Bodine Racing	Ford
16	Ted Musgrave	Roush Racing	Ford
17	Darrell Waltrip	Darrell Waltrip Motorsports	Chevrolet
18	Bobby Labonte	Joe Gibbs Racing	Pontiac
19	Gary Bradberry	TriStar Motorsports	Ford
21	Michael Waltrip	Wood Brothers Racing	Ford
22	Ward Burton	Bill Davis Racing	Pontiac
23	Jimmy Spencer	Haas-Carter Motorsports	Ford
24	Jeff Gordon	Hendrick Motorsports	Chevrolet
25	Ricky Craven	Hendrick Motorsports	Chevrolet
28	Ernie Irvan	Robert Yates Racing	Ford
29	Jeff Green (R)	Diamond Ridge Motorsports	Chevrolet
30	Johnny Benson Jr.	Bahari Racing	Pontiac
31	Mike Skinner (R)	Richard Childress Racing	Chevrolet
33	Ken Schrader	Andy Petree Racing	Chevrolet
36	Derrike Cope	MB2 Motorsports	Pontiac
37	Jeremy Mayfield	Kranefuss-Haas Racing	Ford
40	Wally Dallenbach Jr.	Team SABCO	Chevrolet
41	Steve Grissom	Larry Hedrick Motorsports	Chevrolet
42	Joe Nemechek	Team SABCO	Chevrolet
43	Bobby Hamilton	Petty Enterprises	Pontiac
44	Kyle Petty	Petty Enterprises	Pontiac
71	Dave Marcis	Marcis Auto Racing	Chevrolet
75	Rick Mast	Butch Mock Motorsports	Ford
77	Bobby Hillin Jr.	Jasper Motorsports	Ford
78	Billy Standridge	Triad Motorsports	Ford
81	Kenny Wallace	FILMAR Racing	Ford
88	Dale Jarrett	Robert Yates Racing	Ford
90	Dick Trickle	Donlavey Racing	Ford
91	Mike Wallace	LJ Racing	Chevrolet
94	Bill Elliott	Bill Elliott Racing	Ford
95	Ed Berrier	Sadler Brothers Racing	Chevrolet
96	David Green (R)	American Equipment Racing	Chevrolet
97	Chad Little	Mark Rypien Motorsports	Pontiac
98	John Andretti	Cale Yarborough Motorsports	Ford
99	Jeff Burton	Roush Racing	Ford

== Qualifying ==
Qualifying was split into two rounds. The first round was held on Friday, May 30, at 3:00 PM EST. Each driver would have one lap to set a time. During the first round, the top 25 drivers in the round would be guaranteed a starting spot in the race. If a driver was not able to guarantee a spot in the first round, they had the option to scrub their time from the first round and try and run a faster lap time in a second round qualifying run, held on Saturday, May 31, at 1:00 PM EST. As with the first round, each driver would have one lap to set a time. Positions 26-38 would be decided on time, and depending on who needed it, the 39th thru either the 42nd, 43rd, or 44th position would be based on provisionals. Four spots are awarded by the use of provisionals based on owner's points. The fifth is awarded to a past champion who has not otherwise qualified for the race. If no past champion needs the provisional, the field would be limited to 42 cars. If a champion needed it, the field would expand to 43 cars. If the race was a companion race with the NASCAR Winston West Series, four spots would be determined by NASCAR Winston Cup Series provisionals, while the final two spots would be given to teams in the Winston West Series, leaving the field at 44 cars.

Bobby Labonte, driving for Joe Gibbs Racing, would win the pole, setting a time of 23.562 and an average speed of 152.788 miles per hour (245.888 km/h).

Two drivers would fail to qualify: Billy Standridge and Ed Berrier.

=== Full qualifying results ===
Pos.	#	Driver	Team	Make	Time	Speed
1	18	Bobby Labonte	Joe Gibbs Racing	Pontiac	23.562	152.788
2	24	Jeff Gordon	Hendrick Motorsports	Chevrolet	23.709	151.841
3	44	Kyle Petty	Petty Enterprises	Pontiac	23.732	151.694
4	42	Joe Nemechek	Team SABCO	Chevrolet	23.767	151.471
5	71	Dave Marcis	Marcis Auto Racing	Chevrolet	23.791	151.318
6	88	Dale Jarrett	Robert Yates Racing	Ford	23.795	151.292
7	6	Mark Martin	Roush Racing	Ford	23.840	151.007
8	96	David Green (R)	American Equipment Racing	Chevrolet	23.844	150.981
9	22	Ward Burton	Bill Davis Racing	Pontiac	23.848	150.956
10	28	Ernie Irvan	Robert Yates Racing	Ford	23.865	150.849
11	33	Ken Schrader	Andy Petree Racing	Chevrolet	23.880	150.754
12	94	Bill Elliott	Bill Elliott Racing	Ford	23.910	150.565
13	10	Ricky Rudd	Rudd Performance Motorsports	Ford	23.911	150.558
14	8	Hut Stricklin	Stavola Brothers Racing	Ford	23.946	150.338
15	36	Derrike Cope	MB2 Motorsports	Pontiac	23.948	150.326
16	97	Chad Little	Mark Rypien Motorsports	Pontiac	23.957	150.269
17	16	Ted Musgrave	Roush Racing	Ford	23.969	150.194
18	2	Rusty Wallace	Penske Racing South	Ford	23.982	150.113
19	25	Ricky Craven	Hendrick Motorsports	Chevrolet	24.009	149.944
20	11	Brett Bodine	Brett Bodine Racing	Ford	24.010	149.938
21	5	Terry Labonte	Hendrick Motorsports	Chevrolet	24.013	149.919
22	23	Jimmy Spencer	Travis Carter Enterprises	Ford	24.031	149.806
23	98	John Andretti	Cale Yarborough Motorsports	Ford	24.040	149.750
24	21	Michael Waltrip	Wood Brothers Racing	Ford	24.043	149.732
25	37	Jeremy Mayfield	Kranefuss-Haas Racing	Ford	24.043	149.732
26	4	Sterling Marlin	Morgan–McClure Motorsports	Chevrolet	23.662	152.143
27	29	Jeff Green (R)	Diamond Ridge Motorsports	Chevrolet	23.797	151.280
28	41	Steve Grissom	Larry Hedrick Motorsports	Chevrolet	23.835	151.038
29	30	Johnny Benson Jr.	Bahari Racing	Pontiac	23.888	150.703
30	75	Rick Mast	Butch Mock Motorsports	Ford	23.923	150.483
31	40	Wally Dallenbach Jr.	Team SABCO	Chevrolet	23.953	150.294
32	90	Dick Trickle	Donlavey Racing	Ford	24.023	149.856
33	91	Mike Wallace	LJ Racing	Chevrolet	24.032	149.800
34	99	Jeff Burton	Roush Racing	Ford	24.044	149.726
35	7	Geoff Bodine	Geoff Bodine Racing	Ford	24.046	149.713
36	1	Morgan Shepherd	Precision Products Racing	Pontiac	24.051	149.682
37	17	Darrell Waltrip	Darrell Waltrip Motorsports	Chevrolet	24.070	149.564
38	77	Bobby Hillin Jr.	Jasper Motorsports	Ford	24.074	149.539
Provisionals
39	43	Bobby Hamilton	Petty Enterprises	Pontiac	-*	-*
40	31	Mike Skinner (R)	Richard Childress Racing	Chevrolet	-*	-*
41	81	Kenny Wallace	FILMAR Racing	Ford	-*	-*
42	19	Gary Bradberry	TriStar Motorsports	Ford	-*	-*
43	3	Dale Earnhardt	Richard Childress Racing	Chevrolet	-*	-*
Failed to qualify
44	78	Billy Standridge	Triad Motorsports	Ford	-*	-*
45	95	Ed Berrier	Sadler Brothers Racing	Chevrolet	-*	-*
Official qualifying results

*Time unavailable.

== Race results ==
Fin	St	#	Driver	Team	Make	Laps	Led	Status	Pts	Winnings
1	13	10	Ricky Rudd	Rudd Performance Motorsports	Ford	500	31	running	180	$95,255
2	7	6	Mark Martin	Roush Racing	Ford	500	1	running	175	$52,405
3	34	99	Jeff Burton	Roush Racing	Ford	500	1	running	170	$53,155
4	25	37	Jeremy Mayfield	Kranefuss-Haas Racing	Ford	500	0	running	160	$37,090
5	3	44	Kyle Petty	Petty Enterprises	Pontiac	500	6	running	160	$31,820
6	11	33	Ken Schrader	Andy Petree Racing	Chevrolet	499	2	running	155	$34,515
7	24	21	Michael Waltrip	Wood Brothers Racing	Ford	499	0	running	146	$32,265
8	12	94	Bill Elliott	Bill Elliott Racing	Ford	499	0	running	142	$31,765
9	40	31	Mike Skinner (R)	Richard Childress Racing	Chevrolet	498	0	running	138	$24,815
10	26	4	Sterling Marlin	Morgan–McClure Motorsports	Chevrolet	498	0	running	134	$39,615
11	17	16	Ted Musgrave	Roush Racing	Ford	498	0	running	130	$29,540
12	30	75	Rick Mast	Butch Mock Motorsports	Ford	498	0	running	127	$28,940
13	19	25	Ricky Craven	Hendrick Motorsports	Chevrolet	498	0	running	124	$28,450
14	21	5	Terry Labonte	Hendrick Motorsports	Chevrolet	497	0	running	121	$38,940
15	4	42	Joe Nemechek	Team SABCO	Chevrolet	497	0	running	118	$22,690
16	43	3	Dale Earnhardt	Richard Childress Racing	Chevrolet	497	0	running	115	$33,265
17	39	43	Bobby Hamilton	Petty Enterprises	Pontiac	497	0	running	112	$31,780
18	8	96	David Green (R)	American Equipment Racing	Chevrolet	496	0	running	109	$16,665
19	14	8	Hut Stricklin	Stavola Brothers Racing	Ford	496	0	running	106	$27,140
20	15	36	Derrike Cope	MB2 Motorsports	Pontiac	495	0	running	103	$22,440
21	29	30	Johnny Benson Jr.	Bahari Racing	Pontiac	495	1	running	105	$26,840
22	22	23	Jimmy Spencer	Travis Carter Enterprises	Ford	493	0	running	97	$26,690
23	33	91	Mike Wallace	LJ Racing	Chevrolet	493	0	running	94	$16,340
24	28	41	Steve Grissom	Larry Hedrick Motorsports	Chevrolet	492	0	running	91	$26,490
25	5	71	Dave Marcis	Marcis Auto Racing	Chevrolet	492	0	running	88	$19,540
26	2	24	Jeff Gordon	Hendrick Motorsports	Chevrolet	490	18	running	90	$33,470
27	41	81	Kenny Wallace	FILMAR Racing	Ford	485	0	handling	82	$26,090
28	37	17	Darrell Waltrip	Darrell Waltrip Motorsports	Chevrolet	482	1	running	84	$26,040
29	23	98	John Andretti	Cale Yarborough Motorsports	Ford	482	0	running	76	$25,490
30	10	28	Ernie Irvan	Robert Yates Racing	Ford	471	151	crash	78	$35,940
31	16	97	Chad Little	Mark Rypien Motorsports	Pontiac	468	0	rear end	70	$15,890
32	6	88	Dale Jarrett	Robert Yates Racing	Ford	463	255	engine	77	$44,130
33	20	11	Brett Bodine	Brett Bodine Racing	Ford	453	0	ignition	64	$22,780
34	9	22	Ward Burton	Bill Davis Racing	Pontiac	435	0	running	61	$15,730
35	42	19	Gary Bradberry	TriStar Motorsports	Ford	398	0	clutch	58	$15,530
36	31	40	Wally Dallenbach Jr.	Team SABCO	Chevrolet	364	0	electrical	55	$22,515
37	27	29	Jeff Green (R)	Diamond Ridge Motorsports	Chevrolet	356	0	suspension	52	$15,485
38	36	1	Morgan Shepherd	Precision Products Racing	Pontiac	323	2	crash	54	$22,485
39	18	2	Rusty Wallace	Penske Racing South	Ford	316	0	engine	46	$32,485
40	1	18	Bobby Labonte	Joe Gibbs Racing	Pontiac	283	29	running	48	$36,485
41	32	90	Dick Trickle	Donlavey Racing	Ford	238	0	crash	40	$15,485
42	35	7	Geoff Bodine	Geoff Bodine Racing	Ford	237	2	crash	42	$22,485
43	38	77	Bobby Hillin Jr.	Jasper Motorsports	Ford	234	0	crash	34	$15,485
Official race results

Previous race: 1997 Coca-Cola 600	NASCAR Winston Cup Series; 1997 season	Next race: 1997 Pocono 500
