= 1997 Miller 400 =

14th race of the 1997 NASCAR Winston Cup Series

Race details
- Race 14 of 32 in the 1997 NASCAR Winston Cup Series
- The 1997 Miller 400 program cover, featuring Rusty Wallace.
- Date: June 15, 1997
- Official name: 29th Annual Miller 400
- Location: Brooklyn, Michigan, Michigan International Speedway
- Course: Permanent racing facility
- Course length: 2 miles (3.2 km)
- Distance: 200 laps, 400 mi (643.737 km)
- Average speed: 153.338 miles per hour (246.774 km/h)

Pole position
Driver	Dale Jarrett	Robert Yates Racing
- Time: 39.201

Most laps led
Driver	Ted Musgrave	Roush Racing
- Laps: 68

Winner
No. 28	Ernie Irvan	Robert Yates Racing

Television in the United States
- Network: CBS
- Announcers: Ken Squier, Ned Jarrett, Buddy Baker

Radio in the United States
- Radio: Motor Racing Network

The 1997 Miller 400 was the 14th stock car race of the 1997 NASCAR Winston Cup Series and the 29th iteration of the event. The race was held on Sunday, June 15, 1997, in Brooklyn, Michigan, at Michigan International Speedway, a two-mile (3.2 km) moderate-banked D-shaped speedway. The race took the scheduled 200 laps to complete. In a comeback victory, Robert Yates Racing driver Ernie Irvan would manage to dominate the late stages of the race to take his 15th and final career NASCAR Winston Cup Series victory and his only victory of the season. To fill out the top three, Bill Elliott Racing driver Bill Elliott and Roush Racing driver Mark Martin would finish second and third, respectively.

== Background ==
The layout of Michigan International Speedway, the venue where the race was held.

The race was held at Michigan International Speedway, a two-mile (3.2 km) moderate-banked D-shaped speedway located in Brooklyn, Michigan. The track is used primarily for NASCAR events. The track is owned by International Speedway Corporation. MIS is recognized as one of motorsports' premier facilities because of its wide racing surface and high banking (by open-wheel standards; the 18-degree banking is modest by stock car standards).

=== Entry list ===
- (R) denotes rookie driver.

#	Driver	Team	Make
1	Jerry Nadeau	Precision Products Racing	Pontiac
2	Rusty Wallace	Penske Racing South	Ford
3	Dale Earnhardt	Richard Childress Racing	Chevrolet
4	Sterling Marlin	Morgan–McClure Motorsports	Chevrolet
5	Terry Labonte	Hendrick Motorsports	Chevrolet
6	Mark Martin	Roush Racing	Ford
7	Geoff Bodine	Mattei Motorsports	Ford
8	Hut Stricklin	Stavola Brothers Racing	Ford
9	Lake Speed	Melling Racing	Ford
10	Ricky Rudd	Rudd Performance Motorsports	Ford
11	Brett Bodine	Brett Bodine Racing	Ford
16	Ted Musgrave	Roush Racing	Ford
17	Darrell Waltrip	Darrell Waltrip Motorsports	Chevrolet
18	Bobby Labonte	Joe Gibbs Racing	Pontiac
19	Gary Bradberry	TriStar Motorsports	Ford
21	Michael Waltrip	Wood Brothers Racing	Ford
22	Ward Burton	Bill Davis Racing	Pontiac
23	Jimmy Spencer	Haas-Carter Motorsports	Ford
24	Jeff Gordon	Hendrick Motorsports	Chevrolet
25	Ricky Craven	Hendrick Motorsports	Chevrolet
27	Rick Wilson	David Blair Motorsports	Ford
28	Ernie Irvan	Robert Yates Racing	Ford
29	Jeff Green (R)	Diamond Ridge Motorsports	Chevrolet
30	Johnny Benson Jr.	Bahari Racing	Pontiac
31	Mike Skinner (R)	Richard Childress Racing	Chevrolet
33	Ken Schrader	Andy Petree Racing	Chevrolet
36	Derrike Cope	MB2 Motorsports	Pontiac
37	Jeremy Mayfield	Kranefuss-Haas Racing	Ford
40	Greg Sacks	Team SABCO	Chevrolet
41	Steve Grissom	Larry Hedrick Motorsports	Chevrolet
42	Joe Nemechek	Team SABCO	Chevrolet
43	Bobby Hamilton	Petty Enterprises	Pontiac
44	Kyle Petty	Petty Enterprises	Pontiac
46	Wally Dallenbach Jr.	Team SABCO	Chevrolet
71	Dave Marcis	Marcis Auto Racing	Chevrolet
75	Rick Mast	Butch Mock Motorsports	Ford
77	Morgan Shepherd	Jasper Motorsports	Ford
78	Billy Standridge	Triad Motorsports	Ford
81	Kenny Wallace	FILMAR Racing	Ford
88	Dale Jarrett	Robert Yates Racing	Ford
90	Dick Trickle	Donlavey Racing	Ford
91	Mike Wallace	LJ Racing	Chevrolet
94	Bill Elliott	Bill Elliott Racing	Ford
95	Ed Berrier	Sadler Brothers Racing	Chevrolet
96	David Green (R)	American Equipment Racing	Chevrolet
97	Chad Little	Mark Rypien Motorsports	Pontiac
98	John Andretti	Cale Yarborough Motorsports	Ford
99	Jeff Burton	Roush Racing	Ford

== Qualifying ==
Qualifying was split into two rounds. The first round was held on Friday, June 13, at 3:30 PM EST. Each driver would have one lap to set a time. During the first round, the top 25 drivers in the round would be guaranteed a starting spot in the race. If a driver was not able to guarantee a spot in the first round, they had the option to scrub their time from the first round and try and run a faster lap time in a second round qualifying run, held on Saturday, June 14, at 10:45 AM EST. As with the first round, each driver would have one lap to set a time. Positions 26-38 would be decided on time, and depending on who needed it, the 39th thru either the 42nd, 43rd, or 44th position would be based on provisionals. Four spots are awarded by the use of provisionals based on owner's points. The fifth is awarded to a past champion who has not otherwise qualified for the race. If no past champion needs the provisional, the field would be limited to 42 cars. If a champion needed it, the field would expand to 43 cars. If the race was a companion race with the NASCAR Winston West Series, four spots would be determined by NASCAR Winston Cup Series provisionals, while the final two spots would be given to teams in the Winston West Series, leaving the field at 44 cars.

Dale Jarrett, driving for Robert Yates Racing, would win the pole, setting a time of 39.201 and an average speed of 183.669 miles per hour (295.587 km/h).

=== Full qualifying results ===
Pos.	#	Driver	Team	Make	Time	Speed
1	88	Dale Jarrett	Robert Yates Racing	Ford	39.201	183.669
2	42	Joe Nemechek	Team SABCO	Chevrolet	39.263	183.379
3	25	Ricky Craven	Hendrick Motorsports	Chevrolet	39.303	183.192
4	4	Sterling Marlin	Morgan–McClure Motorsports	Chevrolet	39.410	182.695
5	16	Ted Musgrave	Roush Racing	Ford	39.474	182.399
6	46	Wally Dallenbach Jr.	Team SABCO	Chevrolet	39.482	182.362
7	30	Johnny Benson Jr.	Bahari Racing	Pontiac	39.512	182.223
8	18	Bobby Labonte	Joe Gibbs Racing	Pontiac	39.526	182.159
9	99	Jeff Burton	Roush Racing	Ford	39.547	182.062
10	23	Jimmy Spencer	Travis Carter Enterprises	Ford	39.580	181.910
11	6	Mark Martin	Roush Racing	Ford	39.611	181.768
12	24	Jeff Gordon	Hendrick Motorsports	Chevrolet	39.616	181.745
13	7	Geoff Bodine	Geoff Bodine Racing	Ford	39.630	181.681
14	29	Jeff Green (R)	Diamond Ridge Motorsports	Chevrolet	39.647	181.603
15	37	Jeremy Mayfield	Kranefuss-Haas Racing	Ford	39.681	181.447
16	31	Mike Skinner (R)	Richard Childress Racing	Chevrolet	39.687	181.420
17	90	Dick Trickle	Donlavey Racing	Ford	39.687	181.420
18	5	Terry Labonte	Hendrick Motorsports	Chevrolet	39.693	181.392
19	2	Rusty Wallace	Penske Racing South	Ford	39.709	181.319
20	28	Ernie Irvan	Robert Yates Racing	Ford	39.713	181.301
21	41	Steve Grissom	Larry Hedrick Motorsports	Chevrolet	39.715	181.292
22	3	Dale Earnhardt	Richard Childress Racing	Chevrolet	39.739	181.182
23	97	Chad Little	Mark Rypien Motorsports	Pontiac	39.739	181.182
24	43	Bobby Hamilton	Petty Enterprises	Pontiac	39.773	181.027
25	71	Dave Marcis	Marcis Auto Racing	Chevrolet	39.787	180.964
26	94	Bill Elliott	Bill Elliott Racing	Ford	39.303	183.192
27	22	Ward Burton	Bill Davis Racing	Pontiac	39.384	182.815
28	78	Billy Standridge	Triad Motorsports	Ford	39.493	182.311
29	96	David Green (R)	American Equipment Racing	Chevrolet	39.529	182.145
30	33	Ken Schrader	Andy Petree Racing	Chevrolet	39.538	182.103
31	27	Rick Wilson	David Blair Motorsports	Ford	39.559	182.007
32	1	Jerry Nadeau	Precision Products Racing	Pontiac	39.566	181.974
33	81	Kenny Wallace	FILMAR Racing	Ford	39.610	181.772
34	10	Ricky Rudd	Rudd Performance Motorsports	Ford	39.625	181.703
35	11	Brett Bodine	Brett Bodine Racing	Ford	39.702	181.351
36	9	Lake Speed	Melling Racing	Ford	39.710	181.315
37	8	Hut Stricklin	Stavola Brothers Racing	Ford	39.730	181.223
38	21	Michael Waltrip	Wood Brothers Racing	Ford	39.735	181.200
Provisionals
39	44	Kyle Petty	Petty Enterprises	Pontiac	-*	-*
40	98	John Andretti	Cale Yarborough Motorsports	Ford	-*	-*
41	75	Rick Mast	Butch Mock Motorsports	Ford	-*	-*
42	36	Derrike Cope	MB2 Motorsports	Pontiac	-*	-*
43	17	Darrell Waltrip	Darrell Waltrip Motorsports	Chevrolet	-*	-*
Failed to qualify
44	91	Mike Wallace	LJ Racing	Chevrolet	-*	-*
45	77	Morgan Shepherd	Jasper Motorsports	Ford	-*	-*
46	95	Ed Berrier	Sadler Brothers Racing	Chevrolet	-*	-*
47	40	Greg Sacks	Team SABCO	Chevrolet	-*	-*
48	19	Gary Bradberry	TriStar Motorsports	Ford	-*	-*
Official qualifying results

*Time not available.

== Race results ==
Fin	St	#	Driver	Team	Make	Laps	Led	Status	Pts	Winnings
1	20	28	Ernie Irvan	Robert Yates Racing	Ford	200	33	running	180	$93,830
2	26	94	Bill Elliott	Bill Elliott Racing	Ford	200	46	running	175	$73,830
3	11	6	Mark Martin	Roush Racing	Ford	200	23	running	170	$48,805
4	5	16	Ted Musgrave	Roush Racing	Ford	200	68	running	170	$42,200
5	12	24	Jeff Gordon	Hendrick Motorsports	Chevrolet	200	0	running	155	$47,425
6	1	88	Dale Jarrett	Robert Yates Racing	Ford	200	0	running	150	$46,525
7	22	3	Dale Earnhardt	Richard Childress Racing	Chevrolet	200	0	running	146	$41,375
8	42	36	Derrike Cope	MB2 Motorsports	Pontiac	200	0	running	142	$33,475
9	8	18	Bobby Labonte	Joe Gibbs Racing	Pontiac	200	3	running	143	$36,125
10	7	30	Johnny Benson Jr.	Bahari Racing	Pontiac	200	0	running	134	$33,625
11	36	9	Lake Speed	Melling Racing	Ford	200	0	running	130	$23,975
12	15	37	Jeremy Mayfield	Kranefuss-Haas Racing	Ford	200	1	running	132	$23,400
13	34	10	Ricky Rudd	Rudd Performance Motorsports	Ford	200	0	running	124	$33,750
14	9	99	Jeff Burton	Roush Racing	Ford	200	3	running	126	$33,300
15	10	23	Jimmy Spencer	Travis Carter Enterprises	Ford	200	0	running	118	$26,750
16	38	21	Michael Waltrip	Wood Brothers Racing	Ford	200	0	running	115	$28,525
17	4	4	Sterling Marlin	Morgan–McClure Motorsports	Chevrolet	200	1	running	117	$33,650
18	3	25	Ricky Craven	Hendrick Motorsports	Chevrolet	200	8	running	114	$33,365
19	35	11	Brett Bodine	Brett Bodine Racing	Ford	199	0	running	106	$27,550
20	6	46	Wally Dallenbach Jr.	Team SABCO	Chevrolet	199	0	running	103	$16,635
21	31	27	Rick Wilson	David Blair Motorsports	Ford	199	0	running	100	$16,415
22	37	8	Hut Stricklin	Stavola Brothers Racing	Ford	199	0	running	97	$26,900
23	17	90	Dick Trickle	Donlavey Racing	Ford	199	0	running	94	$19,665
24	43	17	Darrell Waltrip	Darrell Waltrip Motorsports	Chevrolet	199	1	running	96	$26,455
25	23	97	Chad Little	Mark Rypien Motorsports	Pontiac	198	0	running	88	$19,220
26	39	44	Kyle Petty	Petty Enterprises	Pontiac	198	0	running	85	$18,960
27	30	33	Ken Schrader	Andy Petree Racing	Chevrolet	198	0	running	82	$25,800
28	29	96	David Green (R)	American Equipment Racing	Chevrolet	198	0	running	79	$15,640
29	19	2	Rusty Wallace	Penske Racing South	Ford	197	13	out of gas	81	$32,505
30	41	75	Rick Mast	Butch Mock Motorsports	Ford	197	0	running	73	$25,440
31	14	29	Jeff Green (R)	Diamond Ridge Motorsports	Chevrolet	197	0	running	70	$18,310
32	24	43	Bobby Hamilton	Petty Enterprises	Pontiac	197	0	running	67	$30,240
33	28	78	Billy Standridge	Triad Motorsports	Ford	195	0	running	64	$15,135
34	25	71	Dave Marcis	Marcis Auto Racing	Chevrolet	189	0	running	61	$17,565
35	27	22	Ward Burton	Bill Davis Racing	Pontiac	188	0	running	58	$21,995
36	32	1	Jerry Nadeau	Precision Products Racing	Pontiac	186	0	running	55	$21,950
37	40	98	John Andretti	Cale Yarborough Motorsports	Ford	174	0	running	52	$21,890
38	21	41	Steve Grissom	Larry Hedrick Motorsports	Chevrolet	162	0	running	49	$21,780
39	18	5	Terry Labonte	Hendrick Motorsports	Chevrolet	135	0	handling	46	$37,880
40	13	7	Geoff Bodine	Geoff Bodine Racing	Ford	121	0	engine	43	$21,780
41	2	42	Joe Nemechek	Team SABCO	Chevrolet	69	0	engine	40	$15,780
42	16	31	Mike Skinner (R)	Richard Childress Racing	Chevrolet	8	0	crash	37	$21,780
43	33	81	Kenny Wallace	FILMAR Racing	Ford	1	0	engine	34	$21,780
Official race results

== Media ==
=== Television ===
The Miller 400 was covered by CBS in the United States for the sixteenth straight year. Ken Squier, two-time NASCAR Cup Series champion Ned Jarrett and 1979 race winner Buddy Baker called the race from the broadcast booth. Mike Joy, Dick Berggren and Ralph Sheheen handled pit road for the television side.

CBS
Booth announcers		Pit reporters
Lap-by-lap	Color-commentators	Pit reporters
Ken Squier	Ned Jarrett; Buddy Baker	Mike Joy; Dick Berggren; Ralph Sheheen

Previous race: 1997 Pocono 500	NASCAR Winston Cup Series; 1997 season	Next race: 1997 California 500
