= 1993 Mello Yello 500 =

27th race of the 1993 NASCAR Winston Cup Series

Race details
- Race 27 of 30 in the 1993 NASCAR Winston Cup Series
- The 1993 Mello Yello 500 program cover, with artwork by NASCAR artist Sam Bass.
- Date: October 10, 1993
- Official name: 34th Annual Mello Yello 500
- Location: Concord, North Carolina, Charlotte Motor Speedway
- Course: Permanent racing facility
- Course length: 1.5 miles (2.41 km)
- Distance: 334 laps, 501 mi (806.281 km)
- Scheduled distance: 334 laps, 501 mi (806.281 km)
- Average speed: 154.537 miles per hour (248.703 km/h)
- Attendance: 110,000

Pole position
Driver	Jeff Gordon	Hendrick Motorsports
- Time: 30.391

Most laps led
Driver	Ernie Irvan	Robert Yates Racing
- Laps: 328

Winner
No. 28	Ernie Irvan	Robert Yates Racing

Television in the United States
- Network: TBS
- Announcers: Ken Squier, Neil Bonnett

Radio in the United States
- Radio: Performance Racing Network

The 1993 Mello Yello 500 was the 27th stock car race of the 1993 NASCAR Winston Cup Series season and the 34th iteration of the event. The race was held on Sunday, October 10, 1993, before an audience of 110,000 in Concord, North Carolina, at Charlotte Motor Speedway, a 1.5 miles (2.4 km) permanent quad-oval. The race took the scheduled 334 laps to complete. At race's end, Robert Yates Racing driver Ernie Irvan would complete a dominant performance, leading 328 laps to take his ninth career NASCAR Winston Cup Series victory and his third and final victory of the season. To fill out the top three, Roush Racing driver Mark Martin and Richard Childress Racing driver Dale Earnhardt would finish second and third, respectively.

== Background ==
The layout of Charlotte Motor Speedway, the venue where the race was held.

Charlotte Motor Speedway is a motorsports complex located in Concord, North Carolina, United States 13 miles from Charlotte, North Carolina. The complex features a 1.5 miles (2.4 km) quad oval track that hosts NASCAR racing including the prestigious Coca-Cola 600 on Memorial Day weekend and the NEXTEL All-Star Challenge, as well as the UAW-GM Quality 500. The speedway was built in 1959 by Bruton Smith and is considered the home track for NASCAR with many race teams located in the Charlotte area. The track is owned and operated by Speedway Motorsports Inc. (SMI) with Marcus Smith (son of Bruton Smith) as track president.

=== Entry list ===
- (R) denotes rookie driver.

#	Driver	Team	Make
1	Rick Mast	Precision Products Racing	Ford
2	Rusty Wallace	Penske Racing South	Pontiac
02	T. W. Taylor	Taylor Racing	Ford
3	Dale Earnhardt	Richard Childress Racing	Chevrolet
4	Joe Nemechek	Morgan–McClure Motorsports	Chevrolet
5	Ricky Rudd	Hendrick Motorsports	Chevrolet
6	Mark Martin	Roush Racing	Ford
7	Geoff Bodine	Geoff Bodine Racing	Ford
8	Sterling Marlin	Stavola Brothers Racing	Ford
11	Bill Elliott	Junior Johnson & Associates	Ford
12	Jimmy Spencer	Bobby Allison Motorsports	Ford
14	Terry Labonte	Hagan Racing	Chevrolet
15	Lake Speed	Bud Moore Engineering	Ford
16	Wally Dallenbach Jr.	Roush Racing	Ford
17	Darrell Waltrip	Darrell Waltrip Motorsports	Chevrolet
18	Dale Jarrett	Joe Gibbs Racing	Chevrolet
19	Chad Little	Mark Rypien Motorsports	Ford
20	Bobby Hamilton	Moroso Racing	Ford
21	Morgan Shepherd	Wood Brothers Racing	Ford
22	Bobby Labonte (R)	Bill Davis Racing	Ford
24	Jeff Gordon (R)	Hendrick Motorsports	Chevrolet
25	Ken Schrader	Hendrick Motorsports	Chevrolet
26	Brett Bodine	King Racing	Ford
27	Hut Stricklin	Junior Johnson & Associates	Ford
28	Ernie Irvan	Robert Yates Racing	Ford
29	Andy Hillenburg	Diamond Ridge Motorsports	Chevrolet
30	Michael Waltrip	Bahari Racing	Pontiac
33	Harry Gant	Leo Jackson Motorsports	Chevrolet
35	Bill Venturini	Venturini Motorsports	Chevrolet
37	Loy Allen Jr.	TriStar Motorsports	Ford
40	Kenny Wallace (R)	SABCO Racing	Pontiac
41	Dick Trickle	Larry Hedrick Motorsports	Chevrolet
42	Kyle Petty	SABCO Racing	Pontiac
44	Rick Wilson	Petty Enterprises	Pontiac
45	Rich Bickle	Terminal Trucking Motorsports	Ford
47	Billy Standridge	Johnson Standridge Racing	Ford
52	Mike Wallace	Jimmy Means Racing	Ford
55	Ted Musgrave	RaDiUs Motorsports	Ford
58	Jeff McClure	McClure Racing	Chevrolet
63	Norm Benning	O'Neil Racing	Oldsmobile
65	Jerry O'Neil	O'Neil Racing	Chevrolet
68	Greg Sacks	TriStar Motorsports	Ford
71	Dave Marcis	Marcis Auto Racing	Chevrolet
72	John Andretti	Tex Racing	Chevrolet
75	Todd Bodine (R)	Butch Mock Motorsports	Ford
85	Jim Sauter	Mansion Motorsports	Ford
90	Bobby Hillin Jr.	Donlavey Racing	Ford
95	Jeremy Mayfield	Sadler Brothers Racing	Ford
98	Derrike Cope	Cale Yarborough Motorsports	Ford
99	Brad Teague	Ball Motorsports	Chevrolet

== Qualifying ==
Qualifying was split into two rounds. The first round was held on Wednesday, October 6, at 4:45 PM EST. Each driver would have one lap to set a time. During the first round, the top 20 drivers in the round would be guaranteed a starting spot in the race. If a driver was not able to guarantee a spot in the first round, they had the option to scrub their time from the first round and try and run a faster lap time in a second round qualifying run, held on Thursday, October 7, at 12:00 PM EST. As with the first round, each driver would have one lap to set a time. For this specific race, positions 21-40 would be decided on time, and depending on who needed it, a select amount of positions were given to cars who had not otherwise qualified but were high enough in owner's points; up to two were given. If needed, a past champion who did not qualify on either time or provisionals could use a champion's provisional, adding one more spot to the field.

Jeff Gordon, driving for Hendrick Motorsports, won the pole, setting a time of 30.391 and an average speed of 177.684 mph (285.955 km/h) in the first round.

Eight drivers would fail to qualify.

=== Full qualifying results ===
Pos.	#	Driver	Team	Make	Time	Speed
1	24	Jeff Gordon (R)	Hendrick Motorsports	Chevrolet	30.391	177.684
2	28	Ernie Irvan	Robert Yates Racing	Ford	30.424	177.491
3	7	Geoff Bodine	Geoff Bodine Racing	Ford	30.427	177.474
4	25	Ken Schrader	Hendrick Motorsports	Chevrolet	30.508	177.003
5	11	Bill Elliott	Junior Johnson & Associates	Ford	30.570	176.644
6	68	Greg Sacks	TriStar Motorsports	Ford	30.584	176.563
7	6	Mark Martin	Roush Racing	Ford	30.599	176.476
8	5	Ricky Rudd	Hendrick Motorsports	Chevrolet	30.644	176.217
9	3	Dale Earnhardt	Richard Childress Racing	Chevrolet	30.647	176.200
10	26	Brett Bodine	King Racing	Ford	30.657	176.142
11	4	Joe Nemechek	Morgan–McClure Motorsports	Chevrolet	30.725	175.753
12	1	Rick Mast	Precision Products Racing	Ford	30.730	175.724
13	33	Harry Gant	Leo Jackson Motorsports	Chevrolet	30.789	175.387
14	98	Derrike Cope	Cale Yarborough Motorsports	Ford	30.805	175.296
15	12	Jimmy Spencer	Bobby Allison Motorsports	Ford	30.827	175.171
16	21	Morgan Shepherd	Wood Brothers Racing	Ford	30.850	175.041
17	75	Todd Bodine (R)	Butch Mock Motorsports	Ford	30.857	175.001
18	44	Rick Wilson	Petty Enterprises	Pontiac	30.898	174.769
19	45	Rich Bickle	Terminal Trucking Motorsports	Ford	30.913	174.684
20	30	Michael Waltrip	Bahari Racing	Pontiac	30.943	174.514
Failed to lock in Round 1
21	2	Rusty Wallace	Penske Racing South	Pontiac	30.950	174.475
22	14	Terry Labonte	Hagan Racing	Chevrolet	30.981	174.300
23	27	Hut Stricklin	Junior Johnson & Associates	Ford	30.994	174.227
24	17	Darrell Waltrip	Darrell Waltrip Motorsports	Chevrolet	31.009	174.143
25	29	Andy Hillenburg	Diamond Ridge Motorsports	Chevrolet	31.016	174.104
26	55	Ted Musgrave	RaDiUs Motorsports	Ford	31.073	173.784
27	41	Dick Trickle	Larry Hedrick Motorsports	Chevrolet	31.076	173.768
28	20	Bobby Hamilton	Moroso Racing	Ford	31.110	173.578
29	85	Jim Sauter	Mansion Motorsports	Ford	31.159	173.305
30	95	Jeremy Mayfield	Sadler Brothers Racing	Ford	31.187	173.149
31	42	Kyle Petty	SABCO Racing	Pontiac	31.193	173.116
32	65	Jerry O'Neil	O'Neil Racing	Chevrolet	31.221	172.961
33	16	Wally Dallenbach Jr.	Roush Racing	Ford	31.244	172.833
34	8	Sterling Marlin	Stavola Brothers Racing	Ford	31.263	172.728
35	52	Mike Wallace	Jimmy Means Racing	Ford	31.267	172.706
36	15	Lake Speed	Bud Moore Engineering	Ford	31.268	172.701
37	90	Bobby Hillin Jr.	Donlavey Racing	Ford	31.275	172.662
38	18	Dale Jarrett	Joe Gibbs Racing	Chevrolet	31.314	172.447
39	19	Chad Little	Mark Rypien Motorsports	Ford	31.314	172.447
40	72	John Andretti	Tex Racing	Chevrolet	31.359	172.199
Provisionals
41	22	Bobby Labonte (R)	Bill Davis Racing	Ford	31.367	172.155
42	40	Kenny Wallace (R)	SABCO Racing	Pontiac	31.398	171.985
Failed to qualify
43	71	Dave Marcis	Marcis Auto Racing	Chevrolet	-*	-*
44	47	Billy Standridge	Johnson Standridge Racing	Ford	-*	-*
45	37	Loy Allen Jr.	TriStar Motorsports	Ford	-*	-*
46	35	Bill Venturini	Venturini Motorsports	Chevrolet	-*	-*
47	63	Norm Benning	O'Neil Racing	Oldsmobile	-*	-*
48	99	Brad Teague	Ball Motorsports	Chevrolet	-*	-*
49	58	Jeff McClure	McClure Racing	Chevrolet	-*	-*
50	02	T. W. Taylor	Taylor Racing	Ford	-*	-*
Official first round qualifying results
Official starting lineup

== Race results ==
Fin	St	#	Driver	Team	Make	Laps	Led	Status	Pts	Winnings
1	2	28	Ernie Irvan	Robert Yates Racing	Ford	334	328	running	185	$146,450
2	7	6	Mark Martin	Roush Racing	Ford	334	2	running	175	$67,900
3	9	3	Dale Earnhardt	Richard Childress Racing	Chevrolet	334	3	running	170	$56,900
4	21	2	Rusty Wallace	Penske Racing South	Pontiac	334	0	running	160	$42,950
5	1	24	Jeff Gordon (R)	Hendrick Motorsports	Chevrolet	334	1	running	160	$56,875
6	15	12	Jimmy Spencer	Bobby Allison Motorsports	Ford	334	0	running	150	$32,750
7	31	42	Kyle Petty	SABCO Racing	Pontiac	334	0	running	146	$28,500
8	8	5	Ricky Rudd	Hendrick Motorsports	Chevrolet	333	0	running	142	$24,500
9	4	25	Ken Schrader	Hendrick Motorsports	Chevrolet	332	0	running	138	$25,400
10	5	11	Bill Elliott	Junior Johnson & Associates	Ford	332	0	running	134	$29,050
11	36	15	Lake Speed	Bud Moore Engineering	Ford	332	0	running	130	$20,200
12	13	33	Harry Gant	Leo Jackson Motorsports	Chevrolet	331	0	running	127	$20,425
13	3	7	Geoff Bodine	Geoff Bodine Racing	Ford	331	0	running	124	$23,150
14	16	21	Morgan Shepherd	Wood Brothers Racing	Ford	331	0	running	121	$15,050
15	10	26	Brett Bodine	King Racing	Ford	331	0	running	118	$14,800
16	22	14	Terry Labonte	Hagan Racing	Chevrolet	331	0	running	115	$13,025
17	34	8	Sterling Marlin	Stavola Brothers Racing	Ford	331	0	running	112	$12,200
18	12	1	Rick Mast	Precision Products Racing	Ford	331	0	running	109	$11,600
19	24	17	Darrell Waltrip	Darrell Waltrip Motorsports	Chevrolet	330	0	running	106	$16,625
20	37	90	Bobby Hillin Jr.	Donlavey Racing	Ford	330	0	running	103	$6,650
21	26	55	Ted Musgrave	RaDiUs Motorsports	Ford	329	0	running	100	$10,800
22	27	41	Dick Trickle	Larry Hedrick Motorsports	Chevrolet	329	0	running	97	$7,575
23	23	27	Hut Stricklin	Junior Johnson & Associates	Ford	329	0	running	94	$10,310
24	33	16	Wally Dallenbach Jr.	Roush Racing	Ford	328	0	running	91	$10,050
25	11	4	Joe Nemechek	Morgan–McClure Motorsports	Chevrolet	326	0	running	88	$14,880
26	38	18	Dale Jarrett	Joe Gibbs Racing	Chevrolet	325	0	running	85	$13,160
27	20	30	Michael Waltrip	Bahari Racing	Pontiac	324	0	running	82	$9,645
28	41	22	Bobby Labonte (R)	Bill Davis Racing	Ford	324	0	running	79	$7,010
29	30	95	Jeremy Mayfield	Sadler Brothers Racing	Ford	324	0	running	76	$4,830
30	35	52	Mike Wallace	Jimmy Means Racing	Ford	323	0	running	73	$4,745
31	40	72	John Andretti	Tex Racing	Chevrolet	323	0	running	70	$4,630
32	6	68	Greg Sacks	TriStar Motorsports	Ford	314	0	running	67	$5,250
33	39	19	Chad Little	Mark Rypien Motorsports	Ford	314	0	running	64	$4,475
34	32	65	Jerry O'Neil	O'Neil Racing	Chevrolet	311	0	oil pressure	61	$4,450
35	42	40	Kenny Wallace (R)	SABCO Racing	Pontiac	304	0	running	58	$5,975
36	18	44	Rick Wilson	Petty Enterprises	Pontiac	302	0	running	55	$5,925
37	28	20	Bobby Hamilton	Moroso Racing	Ford	299	0	running	52	$4,390
38	29	85	Jim Sauter	Mansion Motorsports	Ford	265	0	engine	49	$4,380
39	14	98	Derrike Cope	Cale Yarborough Motorsports	Ford	253	0	engine	46	$8,870
40	19	45	Rich Bickle	Terminal Trucking Motorsports	Ford	252	0	handling	43	$4,365
41	25	29	Andy Hillenburg	Diamond Ridge Motorsports	Chevrolet	242	0	fatigue	40	$4,365
42	17	75	Todd Bodine (R)	Butch Mock Motorsports	Ford	140	0	crash	37	$5,365
Official race results

== Standings after the race ==
Drivers' Championship standings

	Pos	Driver	Points
	1	Dale Earnhardt	4,047
	2	Rusty Wallace	3,965 (-82)
1	3	Mark Martin	3,702 (-345)
1	4	Dale Jarrett	3,656 (–391)
	5	Morgan Shepherd	3,475 (–572)
	6	Kyle Petty	3,436 (–611)
	7	Ken Schrader	3,422 (–625)
	8	Ernie Irvan	3,377 (–670)
	9	Bill Elliott	3,284 (–763)
1	10	Jeff Gordon	3,209 (–838)
Official driver's standings

- Note: Only the first 10 positions are included for the driver standings.

Previous race: 1993 Tyson Holly Farms 400	NASCAR Winston Cup Series; 1993 season	Next race: 1993 AC Delco 500
