= 1997 California 500 =

Race details
- Race 15 of 32 in the 1997 NASCAR Winston Cup Series
- The 1997 California 500 program cover.
- Date: June 22, 1997
- Location: California Speedway, Fontana, California
- Course: Permanent racing facility
- Course length: 2 miles (3.22 km)
- Distance: 250 laps, 500 mi (804.67 km)
- Weather: Hot with temperatures approaching 91.9 °F (33.3 °C); wind speeds up to 12 miles per hour (19 km/h)
- Average speed: 155.12 miles per hour (249.64 km/h)

Pole position
Driver	Joe Nemechek	Felix Sabates

Most laps led
Driver	Jeff Gordon	Hendrick Motorsports
- Laps: 113

Winner
No. 24	Jeff Gordon	Hendrick Motorsports

Television in the United States
- Network: ABC Sports
- Announcers: Bob Jenkins and Benny Parsons

Radio in the United States
- Radio: MRN
- Booth announcers: Allen Bestwick, Barney Hall
- Turn announcers: Joe Moore (1 & 2), and Dan Hubbard (3 & 4)

The 1997 California 500 presented by NAPA was the inaugural NASCAR Winston Cup Series stock car race held at California Speedway in Fontana, California. The race was the 15th in the 1997 NASCAR Winston Cup Series season. Though Greg Sacks was the fastest qualifier, he had to start 26th due to not being a first day qualifier, and the pole position was instead given to Sacks' teammate, fellow Felix Sabates driver Joe Nemechek, who ran with an average speed of 183.015 mph (294.534 km/h). The race was won by Jeff Gordon of Hendrick Motorsports, who also led the most laps with 113. A crowd of 85,000 attended the race, the first race in southern California since 1988, when Riverside International Raceway held the Budweiser 400.

== Background ==
The layout of California Speedway, the venue where the race was held.

The track, Auto Club Speedway, was a four-turn superspeedway that was 2 miles (3.2 km) long. The track's turns were banked from fourteen degrees, while the front stretch, the location of the finish line, was banked at eleven degrees. Unlike the front stretch, the backstraightaway was banked at three degrees.

== Race ==
The national anthem was performed by 20th Century Fox Records recording artists Ambrosia, NAPA vice president Wayne Wells gave the command for drivers to start their engines, and track executive Les Richter was the grand marshal.

On lap 29, Hut Stricklin hit the turn four wall, and was later treated for abrasions. Later in the race, Greg Sacks hit the turn two wall. Much of the race was dominated by Jeff Gordon, who led the most laps with 113 laps, though heading into the final 16 laps Mark Martin was able to pass Gordon, but had to pit to refuel three laps later. On the final lap, Gordon ran out of fuel, and with Hendrick teammate Terry Labonte closing in, Gordon coasted across the finish line to beat Labonte by 1.074 seconds and claim his fifth victory of the season. Ricky Rudd, Ted Musgrave, Jimmy Spencer and Bobby Labonte closed out the top five.

== Results ==
Pos	Grid	No.	Driver	Team	Manufacturer	Laps	Laps led	Points	Time/Status
1	3	24	Jeff Gordon	Hendrick Motorsports	Chevrolet	250	113	185	3:13:32
2	10	5	Terry Labonte	Hendrick Motorsports	Chevrolet	250	41	175	+1.074
3	39	10	Ricky Rudd	Rudd Performance Motorsports	Ford	250	0	165	Running, lead lap
4	20	16	Ted Musgrave	Roush Racing	Ford	250	0	160	Running, lead lap
5	19	23	Jimmy Spencer	Travis Carter Enterprises	Ford	250	4	160	Running, lead lap
6	15	18	Bobby Labonte	Joe Gibbs Racing	Pontiac	250	0	150	Running, lead lap
7	7	29	Jeff Green	Diamond Ridge Motorsports	Chevrolet	250	0	146	Running, lead lap
8	9	88	Dale Jarrett	Robert Yates Racing	Ford	250	49	147	Running, lead lap
9	11	25	Ricky Craven	Hendrick Motorsports	Chevrolet	250	8	143	Running, lead lap
10	12	6	Mark Martin	Roush Racing	Ford	249	11	139	Out of gas
11	18	21	Michael Waltrip	Wood Brothers Racing	Ford	249	0	130	+1 lap
12	21	37	Jeremy Mayfield	Kranefuss-Haas Racing	Ford	249	0	127	+1 lap
13	13	30	Johnny Benson Jr.	Bahari Racing	Pontiac	249	0	124	+1 lap
14	16	2	Rusty Wallace	Penske Racing	Ford	249	0	121	+1 lap
15	8	17	Darrell Waltrip	Darrell Waltrip Motorsports	Chevrolet	249	2	123	+1 lap
16	14	3	Dale Earnhardt	Richard Childress Racing	Chevrolet	249	0	115	+1 lap
17	41	41	Steve Grissom	Larry Hedrick Motorsports	Chevrolet	249	0	112	+1 lap
18	1	42	Joe Nemechek	Team SABCO	Chevrolet	248	1	114	+2 laps
19	24	97	Chad Little	Mark Rypien Motorsports	Pontiac	248	0	106	+2 laps
20	22	9	Lake Speed	Melling Racing	Ford	248	0	103	+2 laps
21	35	98	John Andretti	Cale Yarborough Motorsports	Ford	248	0	100	+2 laps
22	42	90	Dick Trickle	Donlavey Racing	Ford	248	0	97	+2 laps
23	30	43	Bobby Hamilton	Petty Enterprises	Pontiac	247	0	94	+3 laps
24	31	77	Morgan Shepherd	Jasper Motorsports	Ford	247	0	91	+3 laps
25	34	96	David Green	American Equipment Racing	Chevrolet	247	0	88	+3 laps
26	36	11	Brett Bodine	Brett Bodine Racing	Ford	247	1	90	+3 laps
27	26	40	Greg Sacks	Team SABCO	Chevrolet	246	0	82	+4 laps
28	40	22	Ward Burton	Bill Davis Racing	Pontiac	246	0	79	+4 laps
29	23	36	Derrike Cope	MB2 Motorsports	Pontiac	245	0	76	+5 laps
30	25	99	Jeff Burton	Roush Racing	Ford	244	0	73	+6 laps
31	38	44	Kyle Petty	PE2 Motorsports	Pontiac	243	0	70	+7 laps
32	17	94	Bill Elliott	Bill Elliott Racing	Ford	241	0	67	Out of gas
33	28	31	Mike Skinner	Richard Childress Racing	Chevrolet	225	0	64	+25 laps
34	5	33	Ken Schrader	Andy Petree Racing	Chevrolet	219	8	66	Engine
35	6	7	Geoff Bodine	Geoff Bodine Racing	Ford	215	0	58	Engine
36	29	4	Sterling Marlin	Morgan–McClure Motorsports	Chevrolet	206	0	55	Engine
37	2	28	Ernie Irvan	Robert Yates Racing	Ford	202	6	57	Engine
38	33	1	Jerry Nadeau	Precision Products Racing	Pontiac	174	0	49	+76 laps
39	4	46	Wally Dallenbach Jr.	Team SABCO	Chevrolet	173	6	51	Electrical
40	32	71	Dave Marcis	Marcis Auto Racing	Chevrolet	146	0	43	Engine
41	37	75	Rick Mast	Butch Mock Motorsports	Ford	94	0	40	Engine
42	27	8	Hut Stricklin	Stavola Brothers Racing	Ford	28	0	37	Crash

=== Failed to qualify ===
- Kenny Wallace (#81)
- Mike Wallace (#91)
- Billy Standridge (#78)

=== Race statistics ===
Lap leaders
Laps	Leader
1	Joe Nemechek
2–7	Wally Dallenbach Jr.
8–31	Jeff Gordon
32	Brett Bodine
33–40	Ken Schrader
41–70	Jeff Gordon
71–72	Mark Martin
73–77	Jeff Gordon
78–80	Mark Martin
81	Jimmy Spencer
82–84	Ricky Craven
85–96	Jeff Gordon
97–141	Dale Jarrett
142–146	Ricky Craven
147–152	Ernie Irvan
153–156	Dale Jarrett
157–197	Terry Labonte
198–200	Jimmy Spencer
201–202	Darrell Waltrip
203–233	Jeff Gordon
234–239	Mark Martin
240–250	Jeff Gordon

Total laps led
Laps led	Driver
113	Jeff Gordon
49	Dale Jarrett
41	Terry Labonte
11	Mark Martin
8	Ricky Craven
8	Ken Schrader
6	Ernie Irvan
6	Wally Dallenbach Jr.
4	Jimmy Spencer
2	Darrell Waltrip
1	Joe Nemechek
1	Brett Bodine

Cautions: 4 for 22 laps
Laps	Reason
31–34	#8 (Stricklin) accident turn 4
96–104	Oil on track
141–146	#40 (Sacks) spin turn 2
149–151	#1 (Nadeau) accident turn 4

== Media ==
=== Television ===
The race was aired live on ABC in the United States. Bob Jenkins and 1973 Cup Series champion Benny Parsons called the race from the broadcast booth. Jerry Punch, Bill Weber and Jack Arute handled pit road for the television side.

ABC
Booth announcers		Pit reporters
Lap-by-lap	Color-commentators	Pit reporters
Bob Jenkins	Benny Parsons	Jerry Punch; Bill Weber; Jack Arute

== Standings after the race ==
Pos	Driver	Points	Differential
1	Jeff Gordon	2295	0
2	Mark Martin	2203	-92
3	Terry Labonte	2176	-119
4	Dale Jarrett	2123	-172
5	Jeff Burton	1971	-324
6	Dale Earnhardt	1948	-347
7	Bobby Labonte	1895	-400
8	Ricky Rudd	1875	-420
9	Michael Waltrip	1753	-542
10 ▲	Jeremy Mayfield	1726	-569

Previous race: 1997 Pepsi 400	NASCAR Winston Cup Series; 1997 season	Next race: 1997 Miller 400
