= 1997 Brickyard 400 =

Race details
- Race 19 of 32 in the 1997 NASCAR Winston Cup Series
- 1997 Brickyard 400 program cover
- Date: August 2, 1997
- Official name: Brickyard 400
- Location: Indianapolis Motor Speedway in Speedway, Indiana
- Course: Permanent racing facility
- Course length: 2.5 miles (4.023 km)
- Distance: 160 laps, 400 mi (643.738 km)
- Average speed: 130.814 miles per hour (210.525 km/h)

Pole position
Driver	Ernie Irvan	Robert Yates Racing
- Time: 50.637

Most laps led
Driver	Ernie Irvan	Robert Yates Racing
- Laps: 39

Winner
No. 10	Ricky Rudd	Rudd Performance Motorsports

Television in the United States
- Network: ABC
- Announcers: Bob Jenkins and Benny Parsons
- Nielsen ratings: 5.3/18

The 1997 Brickyard 400, the 4th running of the event, was a NASCAR Winston Cup Series race held on August 2, 1997, at Indianapolis Motor Speedway in Speedway, Indiana. Contested over 160 laps on the 2.5-mile (4.0-kilometre) speedway, it was the 19th race of the 1997 NASCAR Winston Cup Series season. Ricky Rudd won the race.

== Background ==
The Indianapolis Motor Speedway, located in Speedway, Indiana, (an enclave suburb of Indianapolis) in the United States, is the home of the Indianapolis 500 and the Brickyard 400. It is located on the corner of 16th Street and Georgetown Road, approximately 6 miles (9.7 kilometres) west of Downtown Indianapolis. It is a four-turn rectangular-oval track that is 2.5 miles (4.0 kilometres) long. The track's turns are banked at 9 degrees, while the front stretch, the location of the finish line, has no banking. The back stretch, opposite of the front, also has a zero degree banking. The racetrack has seats for more than 250,000 spectators.

== Summary ==
In the final twenty laps, Dale Jarrett, Jeff Gordon, and Mark Martin held the top three spots, but none of the three would be able to make it to the finish without one final pit stop for fuel. Jeff Burton and Ricky Rudd also were close on fuel. On lap 145, Robby Gordon brushed the wall, and Burton ran over debris. Burton was forced to pit under green, but as he was finishing his stop, the caution came out. Burton flew out of the pits to beat the leaders, and for a moment it appeared he was in the cat bird's seat with four fresh tires, and would be the leader after all other drivers cycled through their stops. However, he was penalized for speeding while exiting the pit lane, and dropped to 15th. Ricky Rudd was among a few drivers who stayed out, and his gamble put him in the lead. Rudd drove the final 46 laps without a pit stop to take the victory.

The race was the last Cup Series start attempt for Tim Steele, and Ron Barfield Jr. also raced his only NASCAR Winston Cup race here.

== Results ==
Pos	SP	No.	Driver	Car make	Entrant	Laps	Status
1	7	10	Ricky Rudd	Ford	Rudd Performance Motorsports	160	Running
2	25	18	Bobby Labonte	Pontiac	Joe Gibbs Racing	160	Running
3	3	88	Dale Jarrett	Ford	Robert Yates Racing	160	Running
4	24	24	Jeff Gordon	Chevrolet	Hendrick Motorsports	160	Running
5	16	37	Jeremy Mayfield	Ford	Kranefuss-Haas Racing	160	Running
6	31	6	Mark Martin	Ford	Roush Racing	160	Running
7	20	30	Johnny Benson Jr.	Pontiac	Bahari Racing	160	Running
8	15	94	Bill Elliott	Ford	Bill Elliott Racing	160	Running
9	6	31	Mike Skinner	Chevrolet	Richard Childress Racing	160	Running
10	1	28	Ernie Irvan	Ford	Robert Yates Racing	160	Running
11	8	33	Ken Schrader	Chevrolet	Andy Petree Racing	160	Running
12	27	9	Lake Speed	Ford	Melling Racing	160	Running
13	39	44	Kyle Petty	Pontiac	PE2 Motorsports	160	Running
14	4	17	Darrell Waltrip	Chevy	Darrell Waltrip Motorsports	160	Running
15	33	99	Jeff Burton	Ford	Roush Racing	160	Running
16	41	25	Ricky Craven	Chevrolet	Hendrick Motorsports	160	Running
17	35	98	John Andretti	Ford	Cale Yarborough Motorsports	160	Running
18	42	11	Brett Bodine	Ford	Brett Bodine Racing	160	Running
19	36	22	Ward Burton	Pontiac	Bill Davis Racing	160	Running
20	12	43	Bobby Hamilton	Pontiac	Petty Enterprises	160	Running
21	34	27	Rick Wilson	Ford	David Blair Motorsports	160	Running
22	23	92	Ron Barfield Jr.	Ford	Bill Elliott Racing	160	Running
23	17	75	Rick Mast	Ford	Butch Mock Motorsports	160	Running
24	40	23	Jimmy Spencer	Ford	Travis Carter Enterprises	159	Running
25	26	29	Jeff Green	Chevrolet	Diamond Ridge Motorsports	159	Running
26	19	41	Steve Grissom	Chevrolet	Larry Hedrick Motorsports	159	Running
27	30	95	Ed Berrier	Chevrolet	Sadler Brothers Racing	159	Running
28	11	40	Robby Gordon	Chevrolet	Team SABCO	159	Running
29	5	3	Dale Earnhardt	Chevrolet	Richard Childress Racing	158	Running
30	29	81	Kenny Wallace	Ford	FILMAR Racing	158	Running
31	37	91	Greg Sacks	Chevrolet	LJ Racing	158	Running
32	2	42	Joe Nemechek	Chevrolet	Team SABCO	156	Running
33	22	16	Ted Musgrave	Ford	Roush Racing	155	Running
34	10	26	Rich Bickle	Chevrolet	Darrell Waltrip Motorsports	153	Crash
35	9	96	David Green	Chevrolet	American Equipment Racing	137	Engine
36	14	46	Wally Dallenbach Jr.	Chevrolet	Team SABCO	120	Ignition
37	28	12	Jeff Purvis	Chevrolet	LAR Motorsports	112	Running
38	43	2	Rusty Wallace	Ford	Penske Racing	91	Engine
39	18	21	Michael Waltrip	Ford	Wood Brothers Racing	89	Running
40	38	5	Terry Labonte	Chevrolet	Hendrick Motorsports	83	Engine
41	32	36	Derrike Cope	Pontiac	MB2 Motorsports	12	Crash
42	21	97	Chad Little	Pontiac	Mark Rypien Motorsports	2	Crash
43	13	4	Sterling Marlin	Chevrolet	Morgan-McClure Motorsports	2	Engine

=== Failed to qualify ===
- Mike Wallace (#1)
- Dick Trickle (#90)
- Geoff Bodine (#7)
- Bobby Hillin Jr. (#78)
- Tim Steele (#61)
- Morgan Shepherd (#77)
- Dave Marcis (#71)
- Hut Stricklin (#8)
- Larry Pearson (#15) – withdrawn
- A. J. Foyt (#50) – withdrawn

=== Race statistics ===
- Time of race: 3:03:28
- Average speed: 130.814 miles per hour (210.525 km/h)
- Pole speed: 177.736 miles per hour (286.038 km/h)
- Cautions: 6 for 25 laps
- Margin of victory: 0.183 seconds
- Lead changes: 19
- Percent of race run under caution: 15.6%
- Average green flag run: 19.3 laps

Lap leaders
Laps	Leader
1–39	Ernie Irvan
40	Jeff Gordon
41	Johnny Benson Jr.
42–54	Wally Dallenbach Jr.
55	Jimmy Spencer
56	Terry Labonte
57	Ricky Craven
58–77	Dale Jarrett
78–80	Jeff Gordon
81	Johnny Benson Jr.
82–83	Jimmy Spencer
84	Wally Dallenbach Jr.
85–88	Jeff Gordon
89–109	Jeff Burton
110–113	Jeff Gordon
114	Ricky Rudd
115–122	Mike Skinner
123–135	Jeff Gordon
136–146	Dale Jarrett
147–160	Ricky Rudd

Total laps led
Laps	Leader
39	Ernie Irvan
31	Dale Jarrett
25	Jeff Gordon
21	Jeff Burton
15	Ricky Rudd
14	Wally Dallenbach Jr.
8	Mike Skinner
3	Jimmy Spencer
2	Johnny Benson Jr.
1	Ricky Craven
1	Terry Labonte

Cautions: 6 for 25 laps
Laps	Reason
4–6	#97 (Chad Little), #96 (David Green), and #12 (Jeff Purvis) crash turn 1
15–20	#36 (Derrike Cope), #21 (Michael Waltrip), #94 (Bill Elliott), #16 (Ted Musgrave), and #43 (Bobby Hamilton) crash turn 2
84–88	#5 (Terry Labonte) engine
114–117	#42 (Joe Nemechek) crash turn 2
147–150	Debris #40 (Robby Gordon)
155–157	#26 (Rich Bickle) crash turn 3

== Media ==
=== Television ===
The race was aired live on ABC in the United States. Bob Jenkins and 1973 NASCAR Winston Cup Series champion Benny Parsons called the race from the broadcast booth. Jerry Punch, Bill Weber and Jack Arute handled pit road for the television side.

ABC
Booth announcers		Pit reporters
Lap-by-lap	Color commentator	Pit reporters
Bob Jenkins	Benny Parsons	Jerry Punch; Bill Weber; Jack Arute
