= Ppc Racing =

NASCAR racing team

ppc Racing
- Owner: Greg Pollex
- Base: Mooresville, North Carolina
- Series: Nextel Cup Series, Busch Series, Craftsman Truck Series
- Manufacturer: Ford, Chevrolet
- Opened: 1993
- Closed: 2007

Career
- Drivers' Championships: Total: 1 Busch Series: 1
- Race victories: Total: 33; Busch Series: 32; Craftsman Truck Series: 1

ppc Racing is a former NASCAR team based in Mooresville, North Carolina. The team was owned by Greg Pollex. ppc Racing came about from a merger of Pollex's Busch Series team with a car owned by Steve DeSouza and Ted Campbell in 1999. The team won the 2000 Busch Series championship with driver Jeff Green and they finished second in the standings four times. The team shut down during the 2007 NASCAR Busch Series season due to a lack of funding. Pollex later joined CJM Racing as a shop foreman before departing late in the season.

== Nextel Cup Series ==
=== Car No. 97 History ===
ppc made its Winston Cup Series racing debut in 1993 at the Mello Yello 500. Chad Little was the driver of the No. 19 Kleenex Ford, and finished 33rd. They would also run the 1994 Daytona 500 in the No. 97 Ford with sponsorship from Tracy Lawrence, where they finished 29th. In 1995, they had their best finish at Talladega Superspeedway, their second of two races. After making five 1996 races in the Sterling Cowboy Pontiac Grand Prix, ppc moved to the Cup Series full-time with Little in the John Deere car. Despite an eighth-place finish at Bristol Motor Speedway, the team had trouble qualifying for races, and Pollex would sell the operation to Jack Roush in the final weeks of the season. (The team would eventually become Kurt Busch's 2004 Nextel Cup winning team, only to be sold to Latitude 43 Motorsports six years later and then folded.)

==== Car No. 97 results ====
Year	Driver	No.	Make	1	2	3	4	5	6	7	8	9	10	11	12	13	14	15	16	17	18	19	20	21	22	23	24	25	26	27	28	29	30	31	32	Owners	Pts
1993	Chad Little	19	Ford	DAY	CAR	RCH	ATL	DAR	BRI	NWS	MAR	TAL	SON	CLT	DOV	POC	MCH	DAY	NHA	POC	TAL	GLN	MCH	BRI	DAR	RCH	DOV	MAR	NWS	CLT; 33	CAR	PHO	ATL				
1994	Chad Little	97	Ford	DAY; 29	CAR	RCH	ATL	DAR	BRI	NWS	MAR	TAL	SON	CLT	DOV	POC	MCH	DAY	NHA	POC	TAL	IND	GLN	MCH	BRI	DAR	RCH	DOV	MAR	NWS	CLT	CAR	PHO	ATL			
1995	Chad Little	97	Ford	DAY; DNQ	CAR	RCH	ATL	DAR	BRI	NWS	MAR	TAL	SON	CLT; 42	DOV	POC	MCH	DAY	NHA	POC	TAL; 18	IND	GLN	MCH	BRI	DAR	RCH	DOV	MAR	NWS	CLT; DNQ	CAR	PHO; DNQ	ATL			
1996	Chad Little	97	Pontiac	DAY; 33	CAR	RCH	ATL	DAR	BRI	NWS	MAR	TAL; DNQ	SON	CLT; 43	DOV	POC	MCH	DAY	NHA	POC	TAL; DNQ	IND	GLN	MCH; 36	BRI	DAR	RCH	DOV	MAR	NWS	CLT; 22	CAR	PHO	ATL; 22		42nd	347
1997	Chad Little	97	Pontiac	DAY; DNQ	CAR; DNQ	RCH; 34	ATL; 19	DAR; 27	TEX; 26	BRI; 8	MAR; 42	SON; DNQ	TAL; 34	CLT; DNQ	DOV; 31	POC; DNQ	MCH; 25	CAL; 19	DAY; 42	NHA; 30	POC; 28	IND; 42	GLN; 42	MCH	BRI	DAR	RCH	NHA	DOV	MAR	CLT	TAL	CAR	PHO	ATL	38th	2227

=== Car No. 14 History ===
In 2004, ppc Racing return to the Cup series with John Andretti driving the No. 14 Ford to attempt five of the last six races with sponsorship from Victory Brand Tobacco and APlus at Sunoco with Dave Charpentier as the crew chief. The 14 team made its debut in that year's UAW-GM Quality 500 at Lowe's Motor Speedway, after qualifying 20th, they finished 22nd, four laps down.

After taking the next race off at Martinsville, the team returned to run the final four races, but missed the field at Darlington. The team's best finish was a 20th in the finale at Homestead.

Andretti, Charpentier, Victory Brand and APlus returned to the 14 team in 2005 with the plan that they will run the full season. The team made the first three races at Daytona, Fontana, and Las Vegas, with their best finishing being a 28th-place effort in the 2005 UAW Daimler-Chrysler 400 at Las Vegas, but they missed the field at Atlanta. Then VB Brand shut down, culminating in the team being forced to dissolve, as there was no other sponsorship to be found.

==== Car No. 14 results ====
Year	Driver	No.	Make	1	2	3	4	5	6	7	8	9	10	11	12	13	14	15	16	17	18	19	20	21	22	23	24	25	26	27	28	29	30	31	32	33	34	35	36	Owners	Pts
2004	John Andretti	14	Ford	DAY	CAR	LVS	ATL	DAR	BRI	TEX	MAR	TAL	CAL	RCH	CLT	DOV	POC	MCH	SON	DAY	CHI	NHA	POC	IND	GLN	MCH	BRI	CAL	RCH	NHA	DOV	TAL	KAN	CLT; 22	MAR	ATL; 25	PHO; 31	DAR; DNQ	HOM; 20	47th	605
2005	John Andretti	14	Ford	DAY; 31	CAL; 29	LVS; 28	ATL; DNQ	BRI	MAR	TEX	PHO	TAL	DAR	RCH	CLT	DOV	POC	MCH	SON	DAY	CHI	NHA	POC	IND	GLN	MCH	BRI	CAL	RCH	NHA	DOV	TAL	KAN	CLT	MAR	ATL	TEX	PHO	HOM	58th	256

== Busch Series ==
=== Car No. 10 History ===
ppc debuted at Darlington in 1993. It was No. 23 Ford sponsored by If Its Paper and driven by Chad Little. At the time, Pollex co-owned the team with NFL quarterback Mark Rypien. Little competed in 12 races with the team that season, posting three top-ten finishes. Going full-time with Bayer Select sponsoring in 1994, Little finished third in the Busch Series points, finishing in the top-ten in half of the races run that season. The next season was even better, as Little collected six victories and a runner-up finish in the points. When Pollex moved Little and the team up to the Cup Series in 1997, the team did not run the Busch Series.

Pollex returned in 1999 with a new operation. This time it was the No. 32 Kleenex Chevrolet driven by Jeff Green. Despite failing to qualify for the spring Rockingham race, Green won three races and finished second in the points in what was a comeback season for both Green and the team. For 2000, the team underwent some changes, as it bought the No. 57 car driven by Jason Keller, and Green's car was now No. 10 and sponsored by Nesquik. Green won six races and the championship by a then-record 616 points over Keller. After yet another successful 2001 season where Green visited Victory Lane four times and wound up second in the points in the team's new Fords, he departed for Richard Childress Racing's Winston Cup team. His replacement was Scott Riggs, an up-and-coming driver from the NASCAR Craftsman Truck Series. Riggs won twice and finished 10th on his way to winning the Busch Series Rookie of the Year. After two more wins and a sixth-place finish in points, Riggs left for MB2 Motorsports, and the team disappeared briefly, before coming back in 2005. Rookie driver Michel Jourdain Jr. was tabbed the car's pilot, and he posted one-top ten finish before being replaced by Brent Sherman with sponsor Serta Mattresses midway through the season.

In 2006, Sherman left ppc and went to the Nextel Cup Series with BAM Racing, being replaced by John Andretti. Andretti had limited success in his rookie season and came into the season finale tied with Danny O'Quinn Jr. in rookie points. Although Andretti finished 16th and O'Quinn 36th, O'Quinn still edged Andretti by 1 point to win Rookie of the Year.

For the 2007 season, ppc Racing announced an alliance with Biagi Brothers Racing and Braun Racing. The No. 10 would become part of the Braun stable keeping the No. 10's owner points and running equipment from the recently shut down Biagi Brothers team, switching from Ford to Toyota. The sponsorship, number, and driver were to remain the same, however Andretti would leave the team following the first race of the 2007 season when funding for the team became questionable. Dave Blaney's No. 32 team for Braun would switch to the number No. 10 the following week at Fontana.

==== Car No. 10 results ====
Year	Driver	No.	Make	1	2	3	4	5	6	7	8	9	10	11	12	13	14	15	16	17	18	19	20	21	22	23	24	25	26	27	28	29	30	31	32	33	34	35	Owners	Pts
1993	Chad Little	23	Ford	DAY	CAR	RCH	DAR; 33	BRI	HCY	ROU	MAR	NZH	CLT; 7	DOV; 2	MYB	GLN	MLW	TAL; 29	IRP; 37	MCH; 33	NHA; 37	BRI; 22	DAR; 3	RCH	DOV	ROU	CLT; 14	MAR	CAR; 41	HCY	ATL; 23								32nd	1171
1994	Chad Little	23	Ford	DAY; 3	CAR; 15	RCH; 22	ATL; 14	MAR; 27	DAR; 18	HCY; 22	BRI; 24	ROU; 15	NHA; 5	NZH; 11	CLT; 34	DOV; 17	MYB; 5	GLN; 8	MLW; 7	SBO; 5	TAL; 6	HCY; 8	IRP; 5	MCH; 2	BRI; 12	DAR; 5	RCH; 14	DOV; 15	CLT; 4	MAR; 5	CAR; 5								3rd	3662
1995	Chad Little	23	Ford	DAY; 1	CAR; 1*	RCH; 32	ATL; 29*	NSV; 2	DAR; 4	BRI; 3	HCY; 23*	NHA; 1	NZH; 19	CLT; 1	DOV; 9	MYB; 32	GLN; 2*	MLW; 8	TAL; 1	SBO; 1*	IRP; 20	MCH; 21	BRI; 4	DAR; 40	RCH; 16	DOV; 13	CLT; 34	CAR; 35	HOM; 26										2nd	3284
1996	Chad Little	23	Pontiac	DAY; 19	CAR; 33	RCH; 20	ATL; 15	NSV; 15	DAR; 37	BRI; 12	HCY; 11	NZH; 11	CLT; 13	DOV; 29	SBO; 8	MYB; 16	GLN; 8	MLW; 21	NHA; 32	TAL; 21	IRP; 27	MCH; 11	BRI; 25	DAR; 12	RCH; 3	DOV; 9	CLT; 4	CAR; 10	HOM; 7										5th	2984
1999	Jeff Green	32	Chevy	DAY; 2	CAR; DNQ	LVS; 8	ATL; 17	DAR; 25	TEX; 3	NSV; 1*	BRI; 23	TAL; 17	CAL; 32	NHA; 2*	RCH; 5*	NZH; 7*	CLT; 10	DOV; 7	SBO; 2	GLN; 40	MLW; 2	MYB; 1	PPR; 4*	GTY; 4	IRP; 3	MCH; 16	BRI; 12	DAR; 17	RCH; 29	DOV; 3	CLT; 15	CAR; 2	MEM; 1	PHO; 11	HOM; 5				2nd	4367
2000	Jeff Green	10	Chevy	DAY; 42	CAR; 2	LVS; 6	ATL; 13	DAR; 4	BRI; 2	TEX; 5	NSV; 12*	TAL; 5	CAL; 3	RCH; 1	NHA; 2	CLT; 3	DOV; 4	SBO; 1*	MYB; 1*	GLN; 10	MLW; 1*	NZH; 4	PPR; 1*	GTY; 5	IRP; 3*	MCH; 14	BRI; 3	DAR; 4	RCH; 2	DOV; 42	CLT; 4	CAR; 1	MEM; 3*	PHO; 4	HOM; 3				1st	5005
2001	Jeff Green	10	Ford	DAY; 4	CAR; 8	LVS; 5	ATL; 4	DAR; 1	BRI; 38	TEX; 32	NSH; 8	TAL; 3	CAL; 3	RCH; 6	NHA; 4	NZH; 3	CLT; 1	DOV; 29	KEN; 31	MLW; 9	GLN; 31	CHI; 6	GTY; 5	PPR; 2	IRP; 6	MCH; 36	BRI; 2	DAR; 9	RCH; 22	DOV; 1	KAN; 1	CLT; 10	MEM; 2*	PHO; 2	CAR; 9*	HOM; 9			2nd	4689
2002	Scott Riggs	10	Ford	DAY; 6	CAR; 4	LVS; 34	DAR; 20	BRI; 9	TEX; 4	NSH; 1	TAL; 19	CAL; 1	RCH; 27	NHA; 7	NZH; 2	CLT; 3	DOV; 11	NSH; 20	KEN; 4*	MLW; 37	DAY; 15	CHI; 30	GTY; 27	PPR; 16	IRP; 11*	MCH; 6	BRI; 18	DAR; 10	RCH; 34	DOV; 14	KAN; 23*	CLT; 39	MEM; 36	ATL; 4	CAR; 18	PHO; 40	HOM; 17		10th	4023
2003	Scott Riggs	10	Ford	DAY; 31	CAR; 17	LVS; 20	DAR; 3	BRI; 23	TEX; 2	TAL; 24	NSH; 11	CAL; 20	RCH; 2*	GTY; 1	NZH; 15	CLT; 3	DOV; 2	NSH; 1*	KEN; 30	MLW; 7*	DAY; 6	CHI; 7	NHA; 14	PPR; 3	IRP; 5	MCH; 5	BRI; 9	DAR; 17	RCH; 29	DOV; 3	KAN; 13	CLT; 13	MEM; 12	ATL; 6	PHO; 6	CAR; 38	HOM; 41		6th	4462
2005	Michel Jourdain Jr.	10	Ford	DAY; 25	CAL; 25	MXC; 37	LVS; 40	ATL; 10	NSH; 22	BRI; 32	TEX; 20	PHO; 37	TAL; 30	DAR; 41	RCH; 21	CLT; 15	DOV; 41	NSH; 40	KEN; 23	MLW; 30	DAY; 39	CHI; DNQ																	26th	2015
2005	Brent Sherman	10	Ford																				NHA; 23	PPR; 27	GTY; 30	IRP; 18	GLN; 29	MCH; 29	BRI; DNQ	CAL; 24	RCH; DNQ	DOV; DNQ	KAN; 22	CLT; 13	MEM; 27	TEX; DNQ	PHO; 26		26th	2015
2005	John Andretti	10	Ford																																			HOM; DNQ	26th	2015
2006	John Andretti	10	Ford	DAY; 34	CAL; 19	MXC; 23	LVS; 42	ATL; 20	BRI; 9	TEX; 19	NSH; 28	PHO; 34	TAL; 16	RCH; 19	DAR; 15	CLT; 17	DOV; 19	NSH; 18	KEN; 15	MLW; 12	DAY; 10	CHI; 25	NHA; 18	MAR; 7	GTY; 26	IRP; 27	GLN; 5	MCH; 30	BRI; 14	CAL; 29	RCH; 16	DOV; 19	KAN; 23	CLT; 25	MEM; 35	TEX; 15	PHO; 25	HOM; 16	12th	3562
2007	John Andretti	10	Toyota	DAY; 39	CAL	MXC	LVS	ATL	BRI	NSH	TEX	PHO	TAL	RCH	DAR	CLT	DOV	NSH	KEN	MLW	NHA	DAY	CHI	GTY	IRP	CGV	GLN	MCH	BRI	CAL	RCH	DOV	KAN	CLT	MEM	TEX	PHO	HOM	147th	46

=== Car No. 22 History ===
The No. 22 car debuted in 1991 as the No. 14 at Lanier Speedway as the No. 54 Air Products Buick owned by driver Jason Keller and his father. Keller started eighth but finished 29th after a crash. The next year, Keller ran five races, but only finished one. In 1993, the team switched to No. 57 and ran 12 races. Despite the abbreviated schedule, Keller had one top-ten finish and finished 33rd in points. In 1994, Keller and his team signed Budget Gourmet to sponsor his Chevrolets, and posted three poles and had a seventeenth-place finish in the points. In 1995, Keller won his first race at IRP and finished fourth in points. Despite not visiting victory lane again in 1996, Keller drove his Slim Jim-sponsored Chevy into a sixth-place points finish. Keller struggled the next two seasons, as he did not finish in the top-ten in points, and was forced to run 1998 without major sponsorship. After that year, owner Steve DeSouza bought his operation, and signed IGA as sponsor. It was the right combination, as Keller won at Bristol and IRP, and climbed to eighth in points.

In 2000, the team merged with ppc and got new sponsorship from Excedrin. While Keller's teammate Jeff Green dominated the Busch Series that year, Keller quietly had a strong season, winning one race and finishing a career-best second in points. Albertsons was the next sponsor to climb on board, and Keller won another race and finished third in points while switching to Fords, before winning four more races and returning to second in points in 2002. After a respectable 2003 season, the team switched to No. 22 and brought Miller High Life on board to sponsor. Keller went winless for the first time since 1998, and departed for Team Rensi Motorsports at the end of the year. He was replaced by Kenny Wallace and sponsor Stacker 2. Wallace had five top-fives and finished seventh in points. He continued to run with ppc with AutoZone backing the car in 2006, but AutoZone departed at the end of the season and Wallace took a full-time Cup ride with Furniture Row Racing. After a number switch with Fitz Motorsports, the team was merged with Carl A. Haas Motorsports in order to run Kyle Krisiloff in the No. 14 Clabber Girl car.

==== Car No. 22 results ====
Year	Driver	No.	Make	1	2	3	4	5	6	7	8	9	10	11	12	13	14	15	16	17	18	19	20	21	22	23	24	25	26	27	28	29	30	31	32	33	34	35	Owners	Pts
1998	Jason Keller	57	Chevy	DAY; 16	CAR; 10	LVS; 33	NSV; 5	DAR; 33	BRI; 5	TEX; 26	HCY; 10	TAL; 11	NHA; 12	NZH; 7	CLT; 38	DOV; 9	RCH; 6	PPR; 33	GLN; 10	MLW; 36	MYB; 33	CAL; 27	SBO; 33	IRP; 16	MCH; 28	BRI; 38	DAR; 41	RCH; 20	DOV; 20	CLT; 33	GTY; 37	CAR; 22	ATL; 22	HOM; 35					16th	2971
1999	Jason Keller	57	Chevy	DAY; 22	CAR; 33	LVS; 10	ATL; 15	DAR; 12	TEX; 6	NSV; 3	BRI; 1*	TAL; 40	CAL; 29	NHA; 6	RCH; 30	NZH; 16	CLT; 11	DOV; 10	SBO; 28	GLN; 5	MLW; 36	MYB; 8	PPR; 33	GTY; 5	IRP; 1*	MCH; 27	BRI; 21	DAR; 23	RCH; 10	DOV; 28	CLT; 29	CAR; 8	MEM; 29	PHO; 40	HOM; 26				8th	3537
2000	Jason Keller	57	Chevy	DAY; 12	CAR; 4	LVS; 34	ATL; 43	DAR; 14	BRI; 9	TEX; 11	NSV; 22	TAL; 22	CAL; 7	RCH; 5	NHA; 3	CLT; 19	DOV; 1	SBO; 7	MYB; 4	GLN; 11	MLW; 5	NZH; 3	PPR; 12	GTY; 4	IRP; 5	MCH; 23	BRI; 2	DAR; 6	RCH; 11	DOV; 2	CLT; 6	CAR; 3	MEM; 15	PHO; 8	HOM; 4				2nd	4389
2001	Jason Keller	57	Ford	DAY; 7	CAR; 10	LVS; 3	ATL; 7	DAR; 3	BRI; 11	TEX; 24	NSH; 2	TAL; 25	CAL; 15	RCH; 18	NHA; 1	NZH; 4	CLT; 3	DOV; 13	KEN; 14	MLW; 5	GLN; 9	CHI; 5	GTY; 2	PPR; 4	IRP; 5	MCH; 8	BRI; 29	DAR; 6	RCH; 13	DOV; 25	KAN; 5	CLT; 2	MEM; 7	PHO; 6	CAR; 4	HOM; 19			3rd	4642
2002	Jason Keller	57	Ford	DAY; 4	CAR; 1	LVS; 22	DAR; 4	BRI; 29	TEX; 13	NSH; 5*	TAL; 1*	CAL; 5	RCH; 1	NHA; 32	NZH; 1*	CLT; 13	DOV; 28	NSH; 5	KEN; 34	MLW; 2	DAY; 4	CHI; 10	GTY; 6	PPR; 3	IRP; 2	MCH; 35	BRI; 9	DAR; 2	RCH; 5	DOV; 5	KAN; 30	CLT; 18	MEM; 10	ATL; 7	CAR; 27	PHO; 4	HOM; 15*		2nd	4644
2003	Jason Keller	57	Ford	DAY; 27	CAR; 5	LVS; 5	DAR; 10	BRI; 3	TEX; 18	TAL; 28	NSH; 27	CAL; 7	RCH; 21	GTY; 3	NZH; 11	CLT; 17	DOV; 11	NSH; 14	KEN; 2	MLW; 1	DAY; 14	CHI; 6	NHA; 7	PPR; 2	IRP; 2	MCH; 23	BRI; 11	DAR; 7	RCH; 21	DOV; 8	KAN; 4	CLT; 10	MEM; 2	ATL; 15	PHO; 17	CAR; 13	HOM; 24		5th	4528
2004	Jason Keller	22	Ford	DAY; 9	CAR; 12	LVS; 8	DAR; 13	BRI; 8	TEX; 12	NSH; 13	TAL; 12	CAL; 19	GTY; 3	RCH; 5	NZH; 4	CLT; 31	DOV; 13	NSH; 33	KEN; 5	MLW; 3	DAY; 18	CHI; 2	NHA; 26	PPR; 13	IRP; 19	MCH; 16	BRI; 8	CAL; 22	RCH; 39	DOV; 12	KAN; 7	CLT; 30	MEM; 6	ATL; 35	PHO; 29	DAR; 16	HOM; 13		6th	4088
2005	Kenny Wallace	22	Ford	DAY; 37	CAL; 13	MXC; 8	LVS; 23	ATL; 12	NSH; 2	BRI; 14	TEX; 9	PHO; 16	TAL; 35	DAR; 2	RCH; 20	CLT; 9	DOV; 9	NSH; 2	KEN; 14	MLW; 8	DAY; 4	CHI; 29	NHA; 11	PPR; 3	GTY; 24	IRP; 11	GLN; 28	MCH; 18	BRI; 35	CAL; 8	RCH; 31	DOV; 11	KAN; 24	CLT; 26	MEM; 18	TEX; 20	PHO; 14	HOM; 29	7th	4068
2006	Kenny Wallace	22	Ford	DAY; 13	CAL; 34	MXC; 19	LVS; 32	ATL; 19	BRI; 8	TEX; 27	NSH; 8	PHO; 28	TAL; 13	RCH; 23	DAR; 16	CLT; 13	DOV; 16	NSH; 11	KEN; 20	MLW; 8	DAY; 14	CHI; 29	NHA; 27	MAR; 13	GTY; 9	IRP; 20	GLN; 31	MCH; 18	BRI; 29	CAL; 36	RCH; 24	DOV; 14	KAN; 22	CLT; 19	MEM; 14	TEX; 16	PHO; 31	HOM; 26	11th	3626

== Craftsman Truck Series ==
=== Truck No. 10 History ===
The No. 10 Ford Power Stroke Diesel by International truck is driven by Terry Cook in the Craftsman Truck Series. Cook joined the team in 2003 leaving K Automotive Racing with 4 wins, 9 top 5s, 17 top 10s, and an 8th-place points finish. During the first 3 years with ppc, Cook would go on a winless slump, like the one he suffered from 1998 to 2002. Between the 2003 and 2005 seasons, Cook would amass a total of 3 poles, 4 top 5s, and 28 top 10s. Although the 10 team's first year together was slightly successful, 2004 and 2005 would be complete disasters for the team, with 2 consecutive years finishing outside the top 10 in points.

In 2006, Cook would receive his first victory in 4 years at Kansas Speedway and finish 8th in the points. He would leave for HT Motorsports at season's end. The following year, ppc's truck equipment was purchased by Circle Bar Racing with International's Maxx Diesel sponsoring David Starr in the No. 10 truck.

==== Truck No. 10 results ====
Year	Driver	No.	Make	1	2	3	4	5	6	7	8	9	10	11	12	13	14	15	16	17	18	19	20	21	22	23	24	25	Owners	Pts
2004	Terry Cook	10	Ford	DAY; 5	ATL; 18	MAR; 22	MFD; 3	CLT; 14	DOV; 20	TEX; 24	MEM; 27	MLW; 7	KAN; 10	KEN; 30	GTW; 26	MCH; 7	IRP; 14	NSH; 16	BRI; 24	RCH; 9	NHA; 35	LVS; 9	CAL; 19	TEX; 32	MAR; 13	PHO; 14	DAR; 12	HOM; 25	17th	2821
2005	Terry Cook	10	Ford	DAY; 20	CAL; 15	ATL; 9	MAR; 10	GTY; 23	MFD; 31	CLT; 2	DOV; 3	TEX; 7	MCH; 13	MLW; 10	KAN; 7	KEN; 25*	MEM; 15	IRP; 12	NSH; 32	BRI; 30	RCH; 19	NHA; 16	LVS; 18	MAR; 7	ATL; 16	TEX; 12	PHO; 25	HOM; 26	17th	2936
2006	Terry Cook	10	Ford	DAY; 10	CAL; 14	ATL; 12	MAR; 19	GTY; 6	CLT; 2	MFD; 22	DOV; 16	TEX; 16	MCH; 9	MLW; 10	KAN; 1	KEN; 16	MEM; 8	IRP; 6	NSH; 10	BRI; 21	NHA; 22	LVS; 16	TAL; 14	MAR; 17	ATL; 2	TEX; 8	PHO; 14	HOM; 10	9th	3265
