= Chad Little =

American racing driver (born 1963)

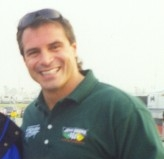
- Little in 1999
- Born: Charles Glen Little Jr. April 29, 1963 (age 63); Spokane, Washington, U.S.
- Achievements: 1987 NASCAR Winston West Series Champion
- Awards: 1986 Winston West Series Rookie of the Year; West Coast Stock Car Hall of Fame (2013)

NASCAR Cup Series career
- 217 races run over 16 years
- 2002 position: 77th
- Best finish: 15th (1998)
- First race: 1986 Budweiser 400 (Riverside)
- Last race: 2002 MBNA Platinum 400 (Dover)
Wins	Top tens	Poles
0	16	0

NASCAR O'Reilly Auto Parts Series career
- 134 races run over 9 years
- 2002 position: 69th
- Best finish: 2nd (1995)
- First race: 1992 Fay's 150 (Watkins Glen)
- Last race: 2002 Sam's Town 300 (Las Vegas)
- First win: 1995 Goody's 300 (Daytona)
- Last win: 1995 Ford Credit 300 (South Boston)
Wins	Top tens	Poles
6	44	1

NASCAR FedEx Freight Truck Series career
- 1 race run over 1 year
- 1995 position: 69th
- Best finish: 69th (1995)
- First race: 1995 Fas Mart Supertruck Shootout (Richmond)
Wins	Top tens	Poles
0	0	0
- Statistics up to date as of July 22, 2026.

Charles Glen Little Jr. (born April 29, 1963) is an American former professional stock car racing driver. He holds a degree in marketing from Washington State University and a J.D. degree from Gonzaga University. While attending Washington State University, he joined the Delta Upsilon fraternity.

Little currently works at NASCAR as managing director for technical inspection and officiating. Little had previously been director of the Camping World Truck Series, as well as the director of racing development for Mexico and the Whelen Modified Tour. He keeps regular office hours in the sanctioning body's research and development center in Concord, North Carolina. He also was a part-time studio analyst for Speed Channel. He is the father of Jesse Little.

== Early years ==
Little began racing the short tracks in Washington in the mid-1980s. He soon began racing in the American Speed Association West late model series, the NASCAR Northwest Tour Series and the NASCAR Winston West Series. One year after being named the NASCAR Winston West Rookie of the Year, Little clinched that series' championship in 1987.

Little made his NASCAR Winston Cup debut in 1986 at Riverside International Raceway, driving the No. 28 Ford owned by George Jefferson. He started 25th and finished thirteenth. He ran the other Riverside race that year but finished 35th after suffering engine failure. He ran both the Riverside races the next year, finishing fifteenth both times in the No. 95 Coors Ford. Little competed in the first NASCAR race held outside North America, the 1988 Goodyear NASCAR 500 at Australia's Calder Park Thunderdome, finishing in eighth.

The following year, Little was eligible for NASCAR Winston Cup Rookie of the Year honors and signed to drive the No. 90 for Junie Donlavey. However, his best finish was an eighteenth, at the Coca-Cola 600, and he was released early in the season. In 1989, he missed United Airlines Flight 232. About a third of the passengers aboard the flight perished during its emergency landing in Iowa. In 1990, Little and his father Chuck teamed to field their own entry, the No. 19 Ford sponsored by Bull's Eye Barbecue Sauce. He ran eighteen races and had seven top-twenty finishes, garnering a 33rd place points finish. The following season, Little made his first full-time attempt at winning the NASCAR Winston Cup Series Championship, qualifying for 28 out of 29 races and posting a tenth-place finish at Charlotte Motor Speedway, finishing 27th in points.

== Busch Series ==
In 1992, Little signed to drive the No. 66 TropArctic Ford for Cale Yarborough but was released six races into the season. Later, he caught on to the No. 9 Ford fielded by Melling Racing and had an eighth-place finish at Talladega. He also made his Busch Series debut that year, starting and finishing 29th in the No. 37 Maxx Race Cards Oldsmobile at Watkins Glen International.

In 1993, Little, along with Greg Pollex and former NFL quarterback Mark Rypien, formed Mark Rypien Motorsports, running the No. 23 If It's Paper-Bayer Select Ford on a limited basis that year, posting a second-place finish at Dover International Speedway. The next year, the team went full time and Little had ten top-five finishes, finishing 3rd in points. He also drove the No. 97 Ford at the Daytona 500 that season, finishing 29th. In 1995, Little broke through and won six races during the course of the season, including the first two races of the season, at Daytona and Rockingham, and finished second in points, behind Johnny Benson. His other wins were at Loudon, Charlotte, Talladega and South Boston. Little did not win a race the following season, however, and slipped to sixth in points. He also ran nine Winston Cup Series races, five in Pollex's No. 97 Sterling Cowboy Pontiac Grand Prix, and another four for Diamond Ridge Motorsports, posting a 20th-place finish at Darlington Raceway,

== Winston Cup ==
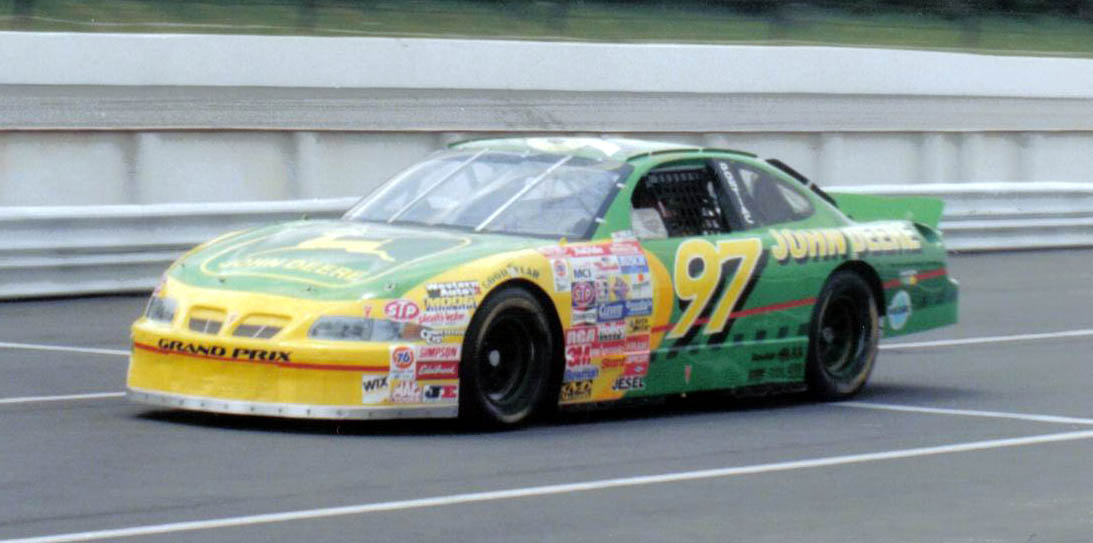
Little's 1997 Winston Cup car

In 1997, Little returned to the Winston Cup Series, running the No. 97 Pontiac for Pollex with sponsorship from John Deere. He finished 7th at the Food City 500, but the team struggled to make races. Late in the year, Jack Roush purchased the team to be added to his stable for 1998. Little ended the 1997 season 36th in points.

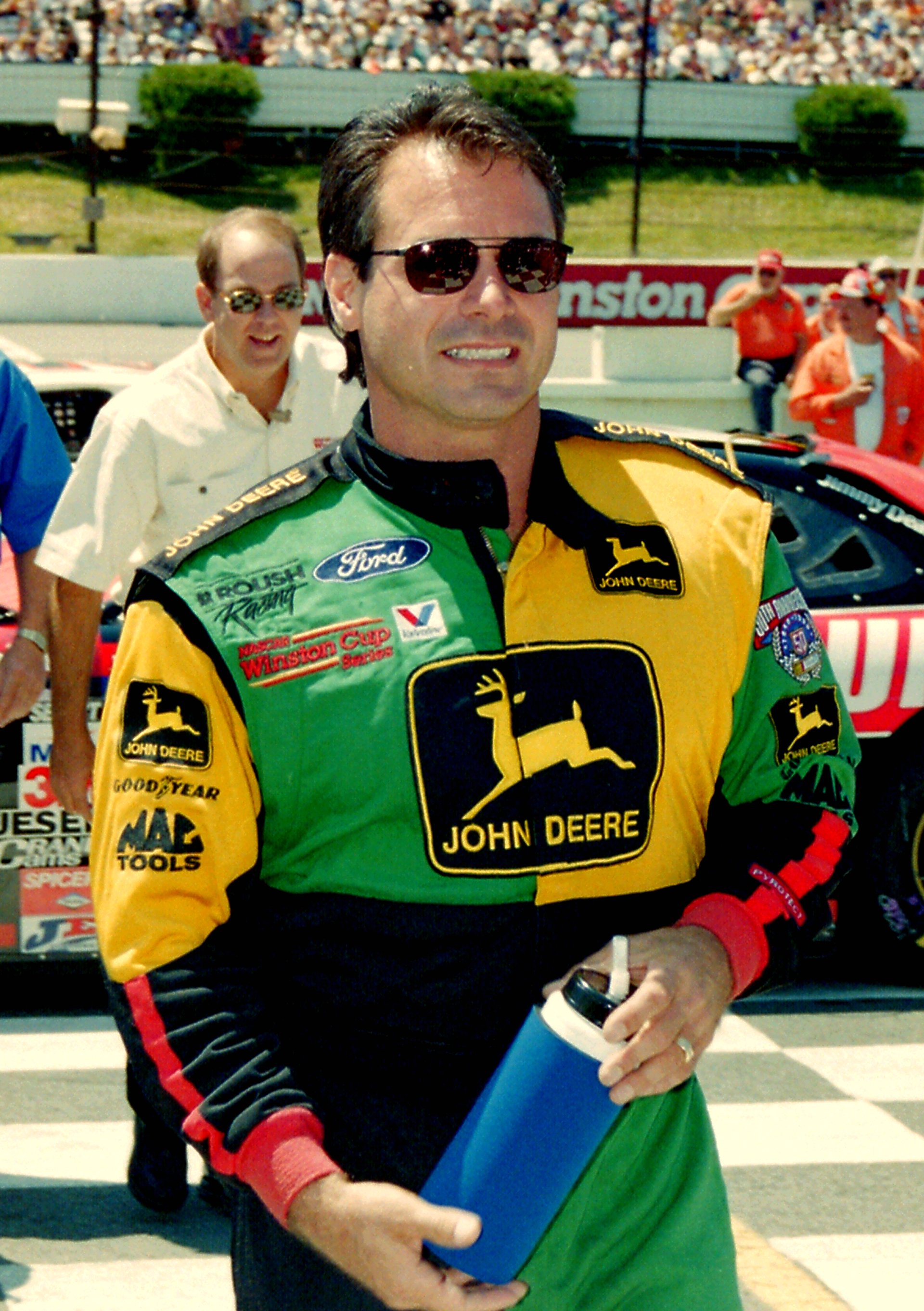
Little during the 1998 Winston Cup Series

In 1998, Little drove for Roush full time with Jeff Hammond as crew chief. Running 32 out of 33 races, he had seven top-tens, including a second-place run at Texas, finishing behind Mark Martin, and finished a career-high 15th in points. He was unable to duplicate that performance in 1999, posting just five top-tens and finishing 23rd in points. After just one top-ten in 2000, Roush announced that Little would not drive the No. 97 the following season. Late in the year, Little was pulled out of the car and replaced by his successor, Kurt Busch, with Hammond still as crew chief. During the season, he also ran a handful of races in the Busch Series. Originally running the No. 30 for Innovative Motorsports, he was released and posted a top-ten in a one-race deal with PPI Motorsports.

Little had 217 career Cup starts in all.

== Final years as driver ==
In 2001, Little signed to drive the No. 74 Staff America Chevrolet Monte Carlo for BACE Motorsports in the Busch Series. He had six top-tens and finished ninth in points. He started off 2002 running for BACE, but the team closed after three races due to sponsor issues. He made his final Cup start in a BACE car at Dover that year, finishing 33rd. He has not run NASCAR since.

== Post-driving career ==
In 2004, Chad called several Truck and Xfinity races from the booth.

Chad later provided competition support for the NASCAR Mexico Corona Series, and became the tour director for the Whelen Modified Tour.

Starting in 2013, Chad took on the role of NASCAR Camping World Truck Series managing director. On February 2, 2015, NASCAR announced that Little would be moving into a new role, as a managing director of technical inspection and officiating. His role as director was replaced by another former driver, Elton Sawyer.

== Motorsports career results ==
=== NASCAR ===
(key) (Bold – Pole position awarded by qualifying time. Italics – Pole position earned by points standings or practice time. * – Most laps led.)

==== Winston Cup Series ====
NASCAR Winston Cup Series results
Year	Team	No.	Make	1	2	3	4	5	6	7	8	9	10	11	12	13	14	15	16	17	18	19	20	21	22	23	24	25	26	27	28	29	30	31	32	33	34	35	36	NWCC	Pts	Ref
1986	Jefferson Racing	28	Ford	DAY	RCH	CAR	ATL	BRI	DAR	NWS	MAR	TAL	DOV	CLT	RSD; 13	POC	MCH	DAY	POC	TAL	GLN	MCH	BRI	DAR	RCH	DOV	MAR	NWS	CLT	CAR	ATL	RSD; 35								70th	182	
1987	Jefferson Racing	95	Ford	DAY	CAR	RCH	ATL	DAR	NWS	BRI	MAR	TAL	CLT	DOV	POC	RSD; 15	MCH	DAY	POC	TAL	GLN	MCH	BRI	DAR	RCH	DOV	MAR	NWS	CLT	CAR	RSD; 15	ATL								60th	236	
1988	Stoke Racing	19	Ford	DAY	RCH	CAR	ATL	DAR	BRI	NWS	MAR	TAL	CLT	DOV	RSD; 23	POC	MCH	DAY	POC	TAL	GLN							CLT; DNQ	NWS	CAR										45th	405	
1988	Autosports Enterprises	19	Ford																			MCH; 27	BRI	DAR	RCH	DOV; 15	MAR													45th	405	
1988	Jefferson Racing	19	Ford																												PHO; 19	ATL								45th	405	
1989	Donlavey Racing	90	Ford	DAY; 36	CAR	ATL; 35	RCH; 22	DAR; 37	BRI	NWS	MAR; 26	TAL; 34	CLT; 18	DOV	SON	POC	MCH	DAY	POC	TAL	GLN	MCH; 26	BRI	DAR	RCH	DOV	MAR	CLT	NWS	CAR	PHO	ATL								38th	602	
1990	Little Racing	19	Ford	DAY; DNQ	RCH; 16	CAR	ATL; 19	DAR; 16	BRI; DNQ	NWS	MAR	TAL; 15	CLT; 24	DOV	SON; 37	POC; 18	MCH	DAY; 27	POC	TAL; 19	GLN	MCH; 22	BRI; DNQ	DAR; 35	RCH; 32	DOV	MAR; 17	NWS; 24	CLT; 40	CAR; 25		ATL; 27								33rd	1632	
1990	Moroso Racing	20	Olds																												PHO; 21									33rd	1632	
1991	Little Racing	19	Ford	DAY; 14	RCH; 16	CAR; 22	ATL; 18	DAR; 36	BRI; 14	NWS; DNQ	MAR; 27	TAL; 38	CLT; 25	DOV; 29	SON; 28	POC; 23	MCH; 26	DAY; 29	POC; 12	TAL; 12	GLN; 11	MCH; 25	BRI; 14	DAR; 36	RCH; 34	DOV; 16	MAR; 24	NWS; 21	CLT; 10	CAR; 23	PHO; 30	ATL; 21								27th	2678	
1992	Cale Yarborough Motorsports	66	Ford	DAY; 39	CAR; 22	RCH; 23	ATL; 23	DAR; 33	BRI; 23	NWS	MAR	TAL	CLT																											31st	1669	
1992	Melling Racing	9	Ford											DOV; 26	SON	POC; 37	MCH; 21	DAY; 24	POC; 17	TAL; 8	GLN	MCH; 17	BRI	DAR; 34	RCH; 27	DOV; 29	MAR	NWS	CLT; 33	CAR; 24	PHO	ATL; 17								31st	1669	
1993	Melling Racing	9	Ford	DAY; 24	CAR	RCH	ATL	DAR	BRI	NWS	MAR	TAL	SON	CLT; 34	DOV	POC	MCH	DAY	NHA	POC	TAL	GLN	MCH	BRI	DAR	RCH	DOV	MAR	NWS											51st	216	
1993	Mark Rypien Motorsports	19	Ford																											CLT; 33	CAR	PHO	ATL							51st	216	
1994	Mark Rypien Motorsports	97	Ford	DAY; 29	CAR	RCH	ATL	DAR	BRI	NWS	MAR	TAL	SON	CLT	DOV	POC	MCH	DAY	NHA	POC	TAL	IND	GLN	MCH	BRI	DAR	RCH	DOV	MAR	NWS	CLT	CAR	PHO	ATL						68th	81	
1995	Mark Rypien Motorsports	97	Ford	DAY; DNQ	CAR	RCH	ATL	DAR	BRI	NWS	MAR	TAL	SON	CLT; 42	DOV	POC	MCH	DAY	NHA	POC	TAL; 18	IND	GLN	MCH	BRI	DAR	RCH	DOV	MAR	NWS	CLT; DNQ	CAR	PHO; DNQ	ATL						53rd	146	
1996	Mark Rypien Motorsports	97	Pontiac	DAY; 33	CAR	RCH	ATL	DAR	BRI	NWS	MAR	TAL; DNQ		CLT; 43	DOV	POC	MCH	DAY	NHA	POC	TAL; DNQ	IND	GLN	MCH; 36							CLT; 22	CAR	PHO	ATL; 22						44th	627	
1996	JTC Racing	45	Chevy										SON; DNQ																											44th	627	
1996	Diamond Ridge Motorsports	29	Chevy																						BRI; 23	DAR; 20	RCH; 40	DOV; 41	MAR; DNQ	NWS										44th	627	
1997	Mark Rypien Motorsports	97	Pontiac	DAY; DNQ	CAR; DNQ	RCH; 34	ATL; 19	DAR; 27	TEX; 26	BRI; 8	MAR; 42	SON; DNQ	TAL; 34	CLT; DNQ	DOV; 31	POC; DNQ	MCH; 25	CAL; 19	DAY; 42	NHA; 30	POC; 28	IND; 42	GLN; 42																	36th	2081	
1997	Roush Racing	97	Pontiac																					MCH; 42	BRI; 20	DAR; 11	RCH; 40	NHA; 28	DOV; 29	MAR; 35	CLT; 23	TAL; 40	CAR; 16	PHO; 25	ATL; 18					36th	2081	
1998	Roush Racing	97	Ford	DAY; 7	CAR; 21	LVS; 10	ATL; DNQ	DAR; 17	BRI; 35	TEX; 2	MAR; 16	TAL; 34	CAL; 6	CLT; 35	DOV; 37	RCH; 13	MCH; 16	POC; 30	SON; 23	NHA; 22	POC; 16	IND; 28	GLN; 16	MCH; 10	BRI; 23	NHA; 14	DAR; 18	RCH; 12	DOV; 17	MAR; 36	CLT; 8	TAL; 8	DAY; 20	PHO; 20	CAR; 40	ATL; 11				15th	3423	
1999	Roush Racing	97	Ford	DAY; 9	CAR; 21	LVS; 14	ATL; 9	DAR; 28	TEX; 13	BRI; 24	MAR; 17	TAL; 42	CAL; 22	RCH; 35	CLT; 24	DOV; 28	MCH; 28	POC; 32	SON; 16	DAY; 29	NHA; 24	POC; 22	IND; 43	GLN; 14	MCH; 6	BRI; 30	DAR; 20	RCH; 42	NHA; 28	DOV; 7	MAR; 31	CLT; 18	TAL; 36	CAR; 21	PHO; 16	HOM; 39	ATL; 6			23rd	3193	
2000	Roush Racing	97	Ford	DAY; 23	CAR; 18	LVS; 19	ATL; 6	DAR; 15	BRI; 23	TEX; 13	MAR; 27	TAL; 25	CAL; 15	RCH; 39	CLT; 20	DOV; 20	MCH; 32	POC; 17	SON; 25	DAY; 16	NHA; 42	POC; 20	IND; 19	GLN; 12	MCH; 22	BRI; 30	DAR; 21	RCH; 29	NHA; 33	DOV	MAR	CLT	TAL; 18	CAR	PHO	HOM	ATL			32nd	2634	
2002	BACE Motorsports	74	Chevy	DAY	CAR	LVS	ATL	DAR	BRI	TEX	MAR	TAL	CAL; DNQ	RCH	CLT; DNQ	DOV; 33	POC	MCH	SON	DAY	CHI	NHA	POC	IND	GLN	MCH	BRI	DAR	RCH	NHA	DOV	KAN	TAL	CLT	MAR	ATL	CAR	PHO	HOM	77th	64	

===== Daytona 500 =====
Year	Team	Manufacturer	Start	Finish
1989	Donlavey Racing	Ford	28	36
1990	Little Racing	Ford	DNQ	
1991	Little Racing	Ford	30	14
1992	Cale Yarborough Motorsports	Ford	14	39
1993	Melling Racing	Ford	17	24
1994	Mark Rypien Motorsports	Ford	17	29
1995	Mark Rypien Motorsports	Ford	DNQ	
1996	Mark Rypien Motorsports	Pontiac	30	33
1997	Mark Rypien Motorsports	Pontiac	DNQ	
1998	Roush Racing	Ford	21	7
1999	Roush Racing	Ford	26	9
2000	Roush Racing	Ford	29	23

==== Busch Series ====
NASCAR Busch Series results
Year	Team	No.	Make	1	2	3	4	5	6	7	8	9	10	11	12	13	14	15	16	17	18	19	20	21	22	23	24	25	26	27	28	29	30	31	32	33	34	NBGNC	Pts	Ref
1992	Little Racing	37	Olds	DAY	CAR	RCH	ATL	MAR	DAR	BRI	HCY	LAN	DUB	NZH	CLT	DOV	ROU	MYB	GLN; 29	VOL	NHA	TAL	IRP	ROU	MCH	NHA	BRI	DAR	RCH	DOV	CLT	MAR	CAR	HCY				120th	76	
1993	Mark Rypien Motorsports	23	Ford	DAY	CAR	RCH	DAR; 33	BRI	HCY	ROU	MAR	NZH	CLT; 7	DOV; 2	MYB	GLN	MLW	TAL; 29	IRP; 37	MCH; 33	NHA; 37	BRI; 22	DAR; 3	RCH	DOV	ROU	CLT; 14	MAR	CAR; 41	HCY	ATL; 23							32nd	1171	
1994	Mark Rypien Motorsports	23	Ford	DAY; 3	CAR; 15	RCH; 22	ATL; 14	MAR; 27	DAR; 18	HCY; 22	BRI; 24	ROU; 15	NHA; 5	NZH; 11	CLT; 34	DOV; 17	MYB; 5	GLN; 8	MLW; 7	SBO; 5	TAL; 6	HCY; 8	IRP; 5	MCH; 2	BRI; 12	DAR; 5	RCH; 14	DOV; 15	CLT; 4	MAR; 5	CAR; 5							3rd	3662	
1995	Mark Rypien Motorsports	23	Ford	DAY; 1	CAR; 1*	RCH; 32	ATL; 29*	NSV; 2	DAR; 4	BRI; 3	HCY; 23*	NHA; 1	NZH; 19	CLT; 1	DOV; 9	MYB; 32	GLN; 2*	MLW; 8	TAL; 1	SBO; 1*	IRP; 20	MCH; 21	BRI; 4	DAR; 40	RCH; 16	DOV; 13	CLT; 34	CAR; 35	HOM; 26									2nd	3284	
1996	Mark Rypien Motorsports	23	Pontiac	DAY; 19	CAR; 33	RCH; 20	ATL; 15	NSV; 15	DAR; 37	**BRI**; 12	HCY; 11	NZH; 11	CLT; 13	DOV; 29	SBO; 8	MYB; 16	GLN; 8	MLW; 21	NHA; 32	TAL; 21	IRP; 27	MCH; 11	BRI; 25	DAR; 12	RCH; 3	DOV; 9	CLT; 4	CAR; 10	HOM; 7									5th	2984	
1998	Roush Racing	9	Ford	DAY	CAR	LVS	NSV	DAR	BRI	TEX	HCY	TAL	NHA	NZH	CLT	DOV	RCH	PPR	GLN	MLW	MYB	CAL	SBO	IRP	MCH	BRI	DAR; 30	RCH	DOV	CLT	GTY	CAR	ATL	HOM				108th	73	
2000	Innovative Motorsports	30	Chevy	DAY	CAR	LVS	ATL	DAR	BRI	TEX; DNQ	NSV	TAL; DNQ	CAL; 12	RCH; DNQ	NHA	CLT; 31	DOV; DNQ	SBO	MYB	GLN	MLW	NZH	PPR	GTY	IRP													66th	398	
2000	PPI Motorsports	97	Ford																							MCH; 10	BRI	DAR	RCH	DOV								66th	398	
2000	BACE Motorsports	74	Chevy																												CLT; DNQ	CAR; 32	MEM	PHO	HOM; DNQ			66th	398	
2001	BACE Motorsports	74	Chevy	DAY; 9	CAR; 15	LVS; 16	ATL; 15	DAR; 24	BRI; 12	TEX; 31	NSH; 27	TAL; 11	CAL; 18	RCH; 20	NHA; 14	NZH; 20	CLT; 21	DOV; 11	KEN; 6	MLW; 20	GLN; 16	CHI; 17	GTY; 13	PPR; 16	IRP; 3	MCH; 16	BRI; 9	DAR; 13	RCH; 6	DOV; 4	KAN; 36	CLT; 17	MEM; 16	PHO; 13	CAR; 17	HOM; 27		9th	3846	
2002	BACE Motorsports	74	Chevy	DAY; 14	CAR; 24	LVS; 21	DAR	BRI	TEX	NSH	TAL	CAL	RCH	NHA	NZH	CLT	DOV	NSH	KEN	MLW	DAY	CHI	GTY	PPR	IRP	MCH	BRI	DAR	RCH	DOV	KAN	CLT	MEM	ATL	CAR	PHO	HOM	69th	312	

==== SuperTruck Series ====
NASCAR SuperTruck Series results
Year	Team	No.	Make	1	2	3	4	5	6	7	8	9	10	11	12	13	14	15	16	17	18	19	20	NSTSC	Pts	Ref
1995	RPM Racing	11	Ford	PHO	TUS	SGS	MMR	POR	EVG	I70	LVL	BRI	MLW	CNS	HPT	IRP	FLM	RCH; 32	MAR; DNQ	NWS; DNQ	SON	MMR	PHO	69th	162	

Achievements
Preceded by Hershel McGriff	NASCAR Winston West Series champion 1987	Succeeded by Roy Smith
