= NASCAR Rookie of the Year =

American car racing award

Sunoco Rookie of the Year logo for 2013

The NASCAR Rookie of the Year Award is presented to the first-year driver that has the best season in a NASCAR season. Each of NASCAR's national and regional touring series selects a RotY winner each year.

== History of the Award ==
The Rookie of the Year award for NASCAR's premier series was first presented to a driver named Blackie Pitt by Houston Lawing, NASCAR's Public Relations director, in 1954. An official award started with the 1958 season.

From the 1958 through the 1973 seasons, NASCAR did not have an official points system to determine the Rookie of the Year, so NASCAR's officials merely gathered together to select a winner. As of 2026, the rookie of the year points are the same as the championship points.

The award is currently sponsored by Sunoco. Drivers competing for the award must display the Sunoco contingency decal.

=== Eligibility ===
Eligibility for Rookie of the Year has changed several times over the history of NASCAR. In 2026, the criteria shifted back to a specific race count. In the Cup Series drivers must have no more than 12 starts prior to the season they intend to declare for the award. For O'Reilly Series drivers the limit is 10, and the limit is 8 for Truck Series drivers. Teams must apply to NASCAR for approval to run for ROTY.

Prior to 2026, driver eligibility was decided on a case-by-case basis by NASCAR. Several drivers were approved with more than 12 starts. Until the late 2010s, the criteria included that drivers must be competing for driver championship points in the series and that the driver must not have competed in more than seven events in any prior season in that series. A driver can also only compete for the Rookie of the Year honors once per series. However, these rules were not officially written in the NASCAR rulebook and NASCAR makes the final decision on eligibility.

== Cup Series ==
=== 2027 ROTY contenders ===
- Jesse Love

=== History ===
Below is a list of all winners, and known runners-up. (Note: some of the drivers listed here are not confirmed as ROTY contenders, and competed in more than the maximum number of races to be eligible for ROTY honors.)

* indicates ROTY who later became the Series Champion

*	Declared for ROTY, but did not make minimum seven (five before 2001) races, thus could be eligible in a later year.
±	Marked drivers during Daytona 500 practice or qualifying events were killed during their rookie seasons and were unable to complete the schedule.
Ø	Moroso died after race 25 of 29 during his rookie season in a vehicular incident where he and his girlfriend were driving home from the September North Wilkesboro round, receiving the award posthumously. Toxicology reports noted Moroso had a BAC more than twice the legal limit (was .22 BAC), leading to a NASCAR rule change later that states a driver must finish the season in good standing. Under modern rules, a driver who is found to be under current indictment of a crime (including DUI/DWI) would be ineligible for the award, in addition to facing an indefinite suspension from the sport.
♦	Hylton finished second in the overall 1966 championship, the highest ever finish for an eligible rookie.
æ	Pitt did not receive an official award.
§	Dick Hutcherson won nine times and finished second in the championship standings in 1965, but was not considered to be eligible due to being a champion in the IMCA.

Year	Winner	Runner(s) Up
2026	Connor Zilisch	
2025	Shane van Gisbergen	Riley Herbst
2024	Carson Hocevar	Josh Berry, Zane Smith, Kaz Grala
2023	Ty Gibbs	Noah Gragson
2022	Austin Cindric	Harrison Burton, Todd Gilliland
2021	Chase Briscoe	Anthony Alfredo
2020	Cole Custer	Tyler Reddick, Christopher Bell, John Hunter Nemechek, Brennan Poole, Quin Houff
2019	Daniel Hemric	Ryan Preece, Matt Tifft
2018	William Byron	Bubba Wallace
2017	Erik Jones	Daniel Suárez, Ty Dillon, Corey LaJoie, Gray Gaulding
2016	Chase Elliott*	Chris Buescher, Ryan Blaney, Brian Scott, Jeffrey Earnhardt
2015	Brett Moffitt	Matt DiBenedetto, Jeb Burton, Alex Kennedy, Tanner Berryhill*
2014	Kyle Larson*	Austin Dillon, Justin Allgaier, Cole Whitt, Michael Annett, Alex Bowman, Ryan Truex, Parker Kligerman
2013	Ricky Stenhouse Jr.	Danica Patrick, Timmy Hill
2012	Stephen Leicht	Josh Wise, Timmy Hill*
2011	Andy Lally	T. J. Bell*, Brian Keselowski*
2010	Kevin Conway	Terry Cook*
2009	Joey Logano*	Scott Speed, Max Papis, Dexter Bean*
2008	Regan Smith	Sam Hornish Jr., Patrick Carpentier, Michael McDowell, Dario Franchitti, Jacques Villeneuve*
2007	Juan Pablo Montoya	David Ragan, Paul Menard, David Reutimann, A. J. Allmendinger, Brandon Whitt*
2006	Denny Hamlin	Clint Bowyer, Martin Truex Jr., Reed Sorenson, J. J. Yeley, David Stremme, Brent Sherman*
2005	Kyle Busch*	Travis Kvapil, Mike Garvey, Stanton Barrett
2004	Kasey Kahne	Brendan Gaughan, Brian Vickers, Scott Wimmer, Scott Riggs, Johnny Sauter
2003	Jamie McMurray	Greg Biffle, Tony Raines, Casey Mears, Jack Sprague, Larry Foyt
2002	Ryan Newman	Jimmie Johnson, Shawna Robinson*, Carl Long*
2001	Kevin Harvick*	Kurt Busch, Casey Atwood, Jason Leffler, Ron Hornaday Jr., Andy Houston
2000	Matt Kenseth*	Dale Earnhardt Jr., Dave Blaney, Scott Pruett, Stacy Compton, Mike Bliss, Ed Berrier, Jeff Fuller*
1999	Tony Stewart*	Elliott Sadler, Buckshot Jones, Stanton Barrett*, Dan Pardus*, Mike Harmon*
1998	Kenny Irwin Jr.	Kevin Lepage, Jerry Nadeau, Steve Park
1997	Mike Skinner	David Green, Jeff Green, Robby Gordon
1996	Johnny Benson Jr.	Randy MacDonald*, Stacy Compton*
1995	Ricky Craven	Robert Pressley, Randy LaJoie, Davy Jones, Steve Kinser*, Mike Chase*, Gary Bradberry*, Terry Byers*
1994	Jeff Burton	Steve Grissom, Joe Nemechek, John Andretti, Mike Wallace, Ward Burton, Jeremy Mayfield, Loy Allen Jr., Billy Standridge, Curtis Markham*, Rick Carelli*, T. W. Taylor*
1993	Jeff Gordon*	Bobby Labonte, Kenny Wallace, P. J. Jones
1992	Jimmy Hensley	Andy Belmont, Dave Mader III*
1991	Bobby Hamilton	Ted Musgrave, Stanley Smith, Wally Dallenbach Jr., Jeff Purvis, Sammy Swindell*, Rich Bickle*, Dave Mader III*, Dorsey Schroeder*
1990	Rob Moroso Ø	Jack Pennington, Jerry O'Neil, Jeff Purvis*
1989	Dick Trickle	Hut Stricklin, Larry Pearson, Jimmy Spencer, Rick Mast, Ben Hess, Chad Little, Butch Miller, Mickey Gibbs
1988	Ken Bouchard	Ernie Irvan, Brad Noffsinger, Jimmy Horton
1987	Davey Allison	Dale Jarrett, Steve Christman, Rodney Combs, Derrike Cope, Jerry Cranmer*
1986	Alan Kulwicki*	Michael Waltrip, Chet Fillip, Davey Allison*, Jerry Cranmer*, Rick Baldwin*, Jonathan Lee Edwards*, Wayne Kramer*
1985	Ken Schrader	Eddie Bierschwale, Don Hume
1984	Rusty Wallace*	Greg Sacks, Phil Parsons, Clark Dwyer
1983	Sterling Marlin	Trevor Boys, Ronnie Hopkins, Ken Ragan, Bobby Hillin Jr.
1982	Geoff Bodine	Mark Martin, Brad Teague
1981	Ron Bouchard	Morgan Shepherd, Tim Richmond, Mike Alexander, Elliott Forbes-Robinson, Joe Ruttman, Stan Barrett, Connie Saylor, Gary Balough
1980	Jody Ridley	Lake Speed, Kyle Petty, Slick Johnson
1979	Dale Earnhardt*	Joe Millikan, Terry Labonte, Harry Gant
1978	Ronnie Thomas	Roger Hamby, Blackie Wangerin, Baxter Price, Al Holbert
1977	Ricky Rudd	Sam Sommers, Janet Guthrie, Tighe Scott, Tommy Gale, Gary Myers
1976	Skip Manning	Terry Bivins, Neil Bonnett, Jimmy Means, Bill Elliott, John A. Utsman, Johnny Ray
1975	Bruce Hill	Carl Adams, Bruce Jacobi, Grant Adcox, Chuck Bown, Joe Mihalic, Travis Tiller, Ferrel Harris, Dick May
1974	Earl Ross	Richie Panch, Jackie Rogers, Ramo Stott
1973	Lennie Pond	Darrell Waltrip, Johnny Barnes
1972	Larry Smith	David Sisco, Doc Faustina
1971	Walter Ballard	Maynard Troyer, Richard Brown, D. K. Ulrich
1970	Bill Dennis	Joe Frasson, Jim Vandiver, Talmadge Prince±
1969	Dick Brooks	Buddy Young, Hoss Ellington
1968	Pete Hamilton	Dave Marcis, Don Tarr
1967	Donnie Allison	Charlie Glotzbach, Paul Dean Holt
1966	James Hylton♦	Bill Seifert, Frank Warren
1965§	Sam McQuagg	Henley Gray, Clyde Lynn
1964	Doug Cooper	J. T. Putney, Buddy Arrington
1963	Billy Wade	Bobby Isaac, Larry Manning, J. D. McDuffie
1962	Thomas Cox	Cale Yarborough, Ed Livingston
1961	Woodie Wilson	Wendell Scott, Lee Reitzel
1960	David Pearson*	Gerald Duke, Paul Lewis
1959	Richard Petty*	Fritz Wilson, Buddy Baker, Bob Burdick
1958	Shorty Rollins	
1957	Ken Rush	
1956	not awarded	
1955	not awarded	
1954	Blackie Pitt æ	

== O'Reilly Auto Parts Series ==
=== 2027 ROTY Contenders ===
- Carson Brown
- Lee Pulliam

* indicates ROTY who later became the Series Champion

Year	Winner	Runner(s) Up
2026	Brent Crews	Patrick Staropoli, Lavar Scott, Luke Fenhaus*
2025	Connor Zilisch	Carson Kvapil, Taylor Gray, Nick Sanchez, Christian Eckes, Dean Thompson, William Sawalich, Daniel Dye
2024	Jesse Love*	Shane van Gisbergen, Leland Honeyman, Hailie Deegan, Dawson Cram
2023	Sammy Smith	Chandler Smith, Parker Retzlaff
2022	Austin Hill	Sheldon Creed, Jesse Iwuji
2021	Ty Gibbs*	Josh Berry, Sam Mayer, Ryan Vargas
2020	Harrison Burton	Riley Herbst, Jesse Little, Joe Graf Jr., Kody Vanderwal
2019	Chase Briscoe	Noah Gragson, Justin Haley, Brandon Brown, John Hunter Nemechek
2018	Tyler Reddick*	Christopher Bell, Austin Cindric, Alex Labbé, Kaz Grala, Spencer Boyd, Vinnie Miller, Chad Finchum, Josh Bilicki, Matt Mills
2017	William Byron*	Cole Custer, Daniel Hemric, Matt Tifft, Spencer Gallagher, Ben Kennedy
2016	Erik Jones	Brennan Poole, Brandon Jones, Ryan Preece, Garrett Smithley, Ray Black Jr., B. J. McLeod, Cody Ware*
2015	Daniel Suárez*	Bubba Wallace, Ross Chastain, Cale Conley, Harrison Rhodes, Peyton Sellers, Josh Reaume
2014	Chase Elliott*	Ty Dillon, Chris Buescher, Ryan Reed, Dylan Kwasniewski, Dakoda Armstrong, Ryan Sieg, Tanner Berryhill, Chad Boat, Tommy Joe Martins, Harrison Rhodes*
2013	Kyle Larson	Alex Bowman, Nelson Piquet Jr., Jeffrey Earnhardt, Kevin Swindell, Dexter Stacey, Hal Martin, Juan Carlos Blum
2012	Austin Dillon*	Cole Whitt, Jason Bowles, Brad Sweet, Johanna Long, Joey Gase, Casey Roderick, Benny Gordon
2011	Timmy Hill	Blake Koch, Ryan Truex, Jennifer Jo Cobb, Charles Lewandoski
2010	Ricky Stenhouse Jr.*	Brian Scott, Colin Braun, James Buescher, Parker Kligerman
2009	Justin Allgaier*	Brendan Gaughan, Michael Annett, Michael McDowell, Erik Darnell, Scott Lagasse Jr., John Wes Townley, Ken Butler III, Terry Cook, Peyton Sellers, Marc Davis*
2008	Landon Cassill	Bryan Clauson, Dario Franchitti, Cale Gale, Brian Keselowski, Chase Miller, Patrick Carpentier
2007	David Ragan	Marcos Ambrose, Brad Keselowski, Kyle Krisiloff, Brad Coleman, Juan Pablo Montoya, Robert Richardson Jr., Sam Hornish Jr., Justin Diercks*, Timothy Peters*, Bobby Santos III*, Alex García*, Brian Conz*
2006	Danny O'Quinn Jr.	John Andretti, Todd Kluever, Burney Lamar, Mark McFarland, Stephen Leicht, David Gilliland, Tracy Hines, Joel Kauffman, A. J. Foyt IV*, Jorge Goeters*, Kevin Conway*, Chris Wimmer*
2005	Carl Edwards*	Reed Sorenson, Denny Hamlin, Jon Wood, Brent Sherman, Kertus Davis, Michel Jourdain Jr., Tyler Walker, Ryan Hemphill, Brandon Miller, Paul Wolfe, Boston Reid*, A. J. Fike*, Blake Feese*, Kim Crosby*, Donnie Neuenberger*
2004	Kyle Busch*	Clint Bowyer, Paul Menard, J. J. Yeley, Billy Parker, Stan Boyd, Travis Geisler, Donnie Neuenberger*, Rick Markle*, Kevin Conway*, Brian Conz*
2003	David Stremme	Coy Gibbs, Joey Clanton, Chad Blount, Jason White, Chase Montgomery, Regan Smith, Damon Lusk, Chris Bingham
2002	Scott Riggs	Johnny Sauter, Shane Hmiel, Kerry Earnhardt, Casey Mears, Brian Vickers, Kasey Kahne, Dan Pardus
2001	Greg Biffle*	Scott Wimmer, Jamie McMurray, Larry Foyt, Tim Sauter, Marty Houston, David Donohue
2000	Kevin Harvick*	Ron Hornaday Jr., Jimmie Johnson, Jay Sauter, Michael Ritch*, P. J. Jones, Anthony Lazzaro, Mike Stefanik, Mike Borkowski, Derrick Gilchrist, Kelly Denton*, Jay Fogleman*, Dave Steele*
1999	Tony Raines	Hank Parker Jr., Adam Petty, Bobby Hamilton Jr., Tony Roper, Andy Kirby, Jimmy Kitchens, Ted Christopher*, Kelly Denton* Phillip Morris*, Kerry Earnhardt*, Skip Smith*
1998	Andy Santerre	Dave Blaney, Blaise Alexander, Kevin Grubb, Wayne Grubb, Casey Atwood, Mike Cope, Matt Hutter, Lance Hooper, Jason Jarrett, Kevin Schwantz, Brad Loney, Hank Parker Jr.*, Mike Stefanik*
1997	Steve Park	Matt Kenseth, Johnny Chapman, Mark Krogh, Jeff Krogh, Lyndon Amick, Chris Diamond, Jimmy Foster, Jeff McClure, Dale Earnhardt Jr., Tim Bender, Doug Reid III, Stanton Barrett, Tim Steele, David Hutto*
1996	Glenn Allen Jr.	Mike Dillon, Shane Hall, Mark Green, Tony Stewart, Mike Harmon, Jerry Nadeau*, Johnny Chapman*, Tim Bender*, Pete Orr*, Andy Hillenburg*, Jimmy Kitchens*, Greg Clark*, Mike Laughlin Jr.*
1995	Jeff Fuller	Curtis Markham, Kirk Shelmerdine, L.W. Miller, David Bonnett, Greg Clark*, John Tanner*, Tim Bender*, Dale Williams*
1994	Johnny Benson Jr.*	Dennis Setzer, Kevin Lepage, Stevie Reeves, Randy Porter, Dirk Stephens, Johnny Rumley, Mike Garvey, Robbie Reiser, Chad Chaffin, Michael Ritch*, Kirk Shelmerdine*, Mike Stefanik*, George Crenshaw*, Jeff Neal*, Andy Hillenburg*
1993	Hermie Sadler	Joe Bessey, Tim Fedewa, Roy Payne, Nathan Buttke, Jason Keller, Michael Ritch*, Tom Hessert*, Alan Russell*, Ken Wallace*, Page Jones*
1992	Ricky Craven (Note: Craven started seven races in 1991 (the limit was five) but was charged with only two starts. The other five starts were in combination races with the Busch North Series, where he raced as a regular. Both 1991 Busch Series wins were in combination races as a North driver.)	Shawna Robinson, Robert Huffman*, Randy MacDonald*, Greg Trammell*
1991	Jeff Gordon	David Green, Tracy Leslie, Troy Beebe, Cecil Eunice, Richard Lasater, Jeff Green, Mike Wallace, Mike Oliver, Mike McLaughlin, Rich Burgess*, Shawna Robinson*
1990	Joe Nemechek*	Bobby Moon, Ward Burton, Jack Sprague, Dana Patten, Davey Johnson, Dave Mader III, Ed Ferree, Frank Fleming, Clifford Allison*
1989	Kenny Wallace	Bobby Hamilton, Jeff Burton, Dave Rezendes, Robert Pressley, Brandon Baker, Dave Simpson, Ed Ferree*, Tom Harrington*

== Craftsman Truck Series ==
=== History ===
* indicates ROTY who later became the Series Champion

Year	Winner	Runner(s) Up
2026	Brenden Queen	Cole Butcher, Mini Tyrell
2025	Gio Ruggiero	Connor Mosack, Andrés Pérez de Lara, Dawson Sutton, Toni Breidinger, Frankie Muniz
2024	Layne Riggs	Conner Jones, Thad Moffitt
2023	Nick Sanchez	Jake Garcia, Rajah Caruth, Bret Holmes, Daniel Dye
2022	Corey Heim*	Lawless Alan, Dean Thompson, Jack Wood, Blaine Perkins
2021	Chandler Smith	Carson Hocevar, Hailie Deegan, Chase Purdy, Kris Wright
2020	Zane Smith*	Christian Eckes, Derek Kraus, Raphaël Lessard, Tanner Gray, Tate Fogleman, Ty Majeski, Spencer Davis
2019	Tyler Ankrum	Sheldon Creed, Harrison Burton, Tyler Dippel, Gus Dean, Spencer Boyd, Brennan Poole, Natalie Decker, Anthony Alfredo
2018	Myatt Snider	Todd Gilliland, Dalton Sargeant, Justin Fontaine, Bo LeMastus, Robby Lyons
2017	Chase Briscoe	Austin Cindric, Grant Enfinger, Noah Gragson, Kaz Grala, Justin Haley, Cody Coughlin, Stewart Friesen, Wendell Chavous
2016	William Byron	Christopher Bell, Cole Custer, Ben Rhodes, Rico Abreu, Austin Wayne Self, Matt Tifft
2015	Erik Jones*	John Hunter Nemechek, Cameron Hayley, Daniel Hemric, Brandon Jones, Spencer Gallagher, Ray Black Jr., Korbin Forrister, Austin Theriault, Justin Boston
2014	Ben Kennedy	Tyler Reddick, Mason Mingus, Tyler Young, Jimmy Weller III
2013	Ryan Blaney	Bubba Wallace, Jeb Burton, Germán Quiroga, Brennan Newberry
2012	Ty Dillon	Cale Gale, Ross Chastain, John Wes Townley, Dakoda Armstrong, Bryan Silas, Max Gresham, Paulie Harraka
2011	Joey Coulter	Nelson Piquet Jr., Cole Whitt, Parker Kligerman, Miguel Paludo, Johanna Long, Craig Goess
2010	Austin Dillon*	Justin Lofton, Jennifer Jo Cobb, Brett Butler
2009	Johnny Sauter*	Tayler Malsam, James Buescher, Ricky Carmichael, J. R. Fitzpatrick, Brian Ickler, Brent Raymer, Chris Jones
2008	Colin Braun	Brian Scott, Scott Speed, Donny Lia, Justin Marks, Marc Mitchell, Andy Lally
2007	Willie Allen	Tim Sauter, Joey Clanton, Jason White, Blake Bjorklund, Aaron Fike
2006	Erik Darnell	Chad McCumbee, Marcos Ambrose, Aric Almirola, Bobby East, Kerry Earnhardt, Erin Crocker, Boston Reid, Joey Miller, Robert Richardson Jr., Kraig Kinser, Scott Lagasse Jr., Ryan Moore
2005	Todd Kluever	Timothy Peters, Shigeaki Hattori, Regan Smith
2004	David Reutimann	Tracy Hines, Robert Huffman, Brandon Whitt, Chase Montgomery, Shane Sieg, Kelly Sutton, Ken Weaver, Chris Wimmer, Shelby Howard, Brad Keselowski
2003	Carl Edwards	Jody Lavender, Randy Briggs, T. J. Bell, Tina Gordon, Doug Keller
2002	Brendan Gaughan	Bill Lester, Jason Small, Dana White
2001	Travis Kvapil*	Ricky Hendrick, Matt Crafton, Billy Bigley, Jon Wood, Willy T. Ribbs, Brian Rose, Nathan Haseleu, Larry Gunselman, Chuck Hossfeld, Ricky Sanders
2000	Kurt Busch	Carlos Contreras, Scott Riggs, Jamie McMurray, Rick Ware, Wayne Edwards, Coy Gibbs, Kenny Martin
1999	Mike Stefanik	Scott Hansen, David Starr, Marty Houston, Tim Steele, Ryan McGlynn, Phil Bonifield
1998	Greg Biffle*	Andy Houston, Scot Walters, Wayne Anderson, Kevin Cywinski, Dominic Dobson, Rob Morgan, Rick McCray
1997	Kenny Irwin Jr.	Rick Crawford, Stacy Compton, Tony Raines, Boris Said, Tony Roper, Tammy Jo Kirk, Randy Tolsma, Terry Cook, Rob Rizzo, Lonnie Rush Jr., Kelly Denton, Mike Cope
1996	Bryan Reffner	Doug George, Lance Norick, Bobby Gill, Jay Sauter, Lonnie Cox, Charlie Cragan, Ron Barfield Jr., Butch Gilliland

== See also ==
- NASCAR Whelen Modified Tour (includes list of WMT RotY award winners)
