= Roy Payne =

Roy Payne may refer to:

- Roy Payne (footballer), Australian rules footballer
- Roy S. Payne, federal U.S. magistrate judge
- Roy Payne (racing driver), American stock car racing driver
