= 1993 NASCAR Busch Series =

American motorsport season

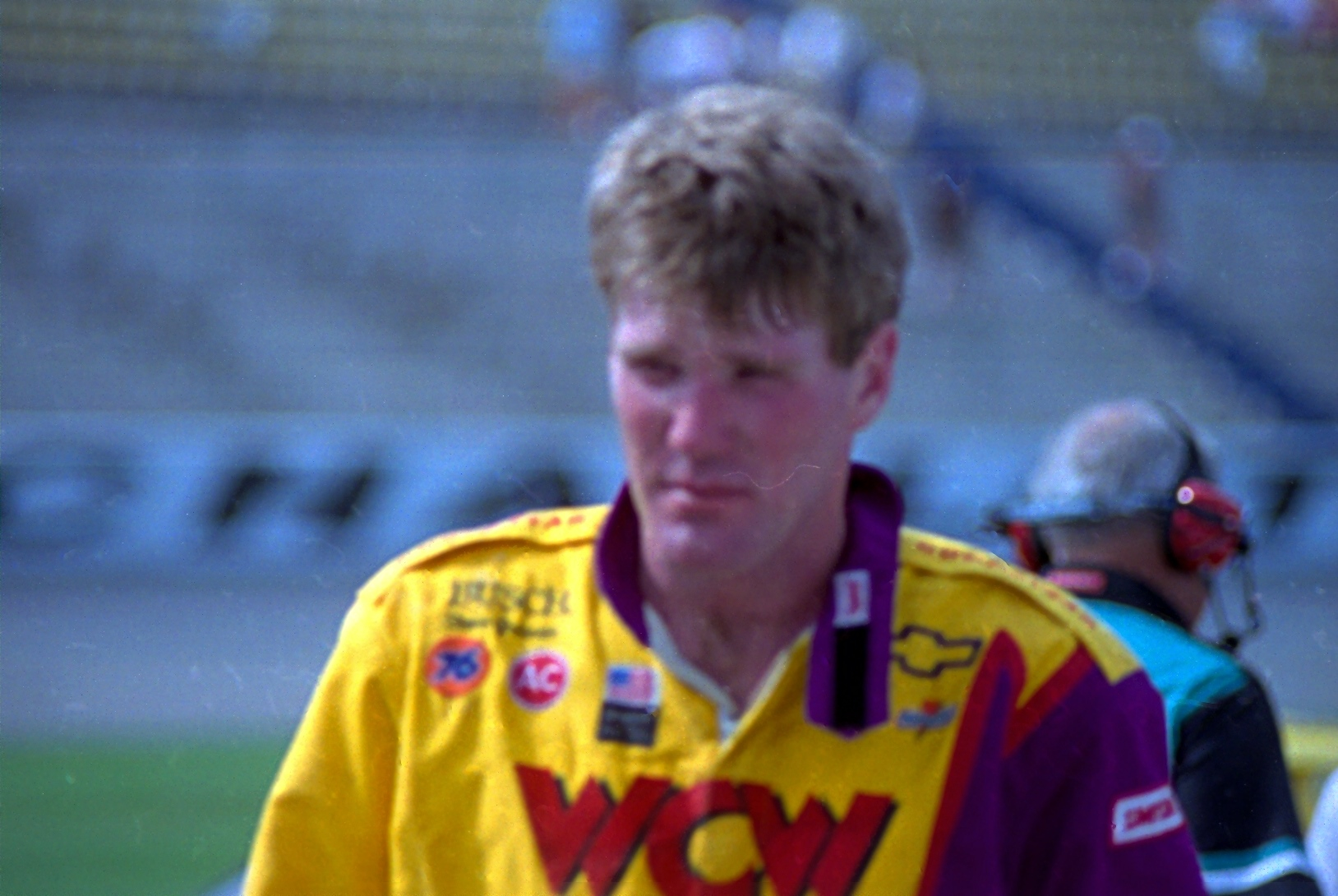
Steve Grissom, the 1993 Busch Series champion

The 1993 NASCAR Busch Series began February 13, 1993 and ended November 13, 1993, with Steve Grissom of Grissom Racing Enterprises winning the championship.

== Teams and drivers ==
List of full-time teams at the start of 1993.

Team	Car(s)	No.	Driver(s)	Listed owner(s)
A.G. Dillard Motorsports	Chevrolet Lumina	2	Ward Burton	Alan Dillard
Alliance Motorsports	Chevrolet Lumina	59	Robert Pressley	Daniel Welch
Allison Motorsports	Ford Thunderbird	28	Davey Allison	Davey Allison
BACE Motorsports	Chevrolet Lumina	74	Jack Sprague	Bill Baumgardner
Beverly Racing	Chevrolet Lumina	25	Hermie Sadler (R)	Don Beverly
Bown Racing	Chevrolet Lumina	98	Jim Bown	Dick Bown
Buttke Racing	Chevrolet Lumina	66	Nathan Buttke (R)	Arlin Buttke
D-R Racing	Chevrolet Lumina	08	Bobby Dotter	Ed Reizen
Day Enterprises	Chevrolet Lumina	16	Jeff Green	Wayne Day
FILMAR Racing	Ford Thunderbird	8	Jeff Burton	Filbert Marcotti
Grissom Racing Enterprises	Chevrolet Lumina	31	Steve Grissom	Wayne Grissom
Henderson Brothers Racing	Chevrolet Lumina	75	Butch Miller	Charlie Henderson
Hensley Motorsports	Chevrolet Lumina	63	Chuck Bown	Hubert Hensley
Houston Racing	Ford Thunderbird	6	Tommy Houston	Tommy Houston
J&J Racing	Chevrolet Lumina	99	Ricky Craven	Bill Papke
Joe Bessey Motorsports	Chevrolet Lumina	97	Joe Bessey (R)	Nancy Bessey
K. R. Rezendes, Inc.	Ford Thunderbird	79	Dave Rezendes	Dave Rezendes
KEL Racing	Chevrolet Lumina	57	Jason Keller (R)	Joe Keller
Labonte Motorsports	Chevrolet Lumina	14	Terry Labonte	Bob Labonte
Labonte Motorsports	Chevrolet Lumina	44	David Green	Bob Labonte
Lasater Motorsports	Chevrolet Lumina	5	Richard Lasater	Dan Lasater
Laughlin Racing Products	Pontiac Grand Prix	35	Shawna Robinson	Mike Laughlin
Levin Racing	Chevrolet Lumina	19	Tom Peck	Carol Levin
Mark Rypien Motorsports	Ford Thunderbird	23	Chad Little	Mark Rypien
Martin Racing	Chevrolet Lumina	92	Larry Pearson	Mac Martin
NEMCO Motorsports	Chevrolet Lumina	87	Joe Nemechek	Andrea Nemechek
Owen Racing	Chevrolet Lumina	9	Mike Wallace	Barry Owen
Parker Racing	Chevrolet Lumina	72	Tracy Leslie	Ron Parker
Payne Racing	Chevrolet Lumina	27	Roy Payne (R)	Curtis Payne
Phil Parsons Racing	Chevrolet Lumina	29	Phil Parsons	Marcia Parsons
RaDiUs Motorsports	Ford Thunderbird	55	Tim Fedewa (R)	Ray DeWitt
Rexrode Racing	Ford Thunderbird	1	Rodney Combs	Rodney Rexrode
Roush Racing	Ford Thunderbird	60	Mark Martin	Jack Roush
Team 34	Chevrolet Lumina	34	Todd Bodine	Frank Cicci
Three Star Motorsports	Oldsmobile Cutlass	22	Ed Berrier	Max Berrier
Whitaker Racing	Chevrolet Lumina	7	Harry Gant	Ed Whitaker

== Races ==
=== Goody's 300 ===
The Goody's 300 was held February 13 at Daytona International Speedway. Ken Schrader won the pole.

Top ten results

1. 3–Dale Earnhardt
2. 52–Ken Schrader
3. 7–Harry Gant
4. 14–Terry Labonte
5. 72–Tracy Leslie
6. 8–Jeff Burton
7. 17–Darrell Waltrip
8. 44–David Green
9. 87–Joe Nemechek
10. 5–Richard Lasater

Failed to qualify: #0 Rick Mast, #09 Scott Herberg, #18 Chad Mader, #29 Phil Parsons, #51 Jeff Purvis, #53 Tony Siscone, #58 Daniel Rogers, #60 Mark Martin, #70 Alan Russell

- After Mark Martin failed to qualify, his car owner Jack Roush bought out the #32 Chevrolet ride owned and driven by Dale Jarrett. Martin would start 34th. However he would crash out of the race on lap 39 and finish 42nd.

=== Goodwrench 200 ===
The Goodwrench 200 was held February 27 at North Carolina Speedway. Joe Nemechek won the pole.

Top ten results

1. 60–Mark Martin
2. 59–Robert Pressley
3. 3–Dale Earnhardt
4. 31–Steve Grissom
5. 44–David Green
6. 19–Tom Peck
7. 7–Harry Gant
8. 57–Jason Keller
9. 75–Butch Miller
10. 63–Chuck Bown

=== Hardee's 200 ===
The Hardee's 200 was held March 6 at Richmond International Raceway. Rick Mast won the pole.

Top ten results

1. 60–Mark Martin
2. 87–Joe Nemechek
3. 8–Jeff Burton
4. 44–David Green
5. 59–Robert Pressley
6. 99–Ricky Craven
7. 19–Tom Peck
8. 0–Rick Mast
9. 34–Todd Bodine
10. 75–Butch Miller

Failed to qualify: #15 Clay Brown, #48 Tom Hessert Jr., #57 Jason Keller, #61 Chad Chaffin, #66 Nathan Buttke, #70 Alan Russell, #97 Joe Bessey

=== Mark III Vans 200 ===
The Mark III Vans 200 was held March 27 at Darlington Raceway. David Green won the pole.

Top ten results

1. 59–Robert Pressley
2. 7–Harry Gant
3. 14–Terry Labonte
4. 2–Ward Burton
5. 34–Todd Bodine
6. 44–David Green
7. 72–Tracy Leslie
8. 92–Larry Pearson
9. 32–Dale Jarrett
10. 11–Bill Elliott

=== Budweiser 250 ===
The Budweiser 250 was held April 3 at Bristol Motor Speedway. Ward Burton won the pole.

Top ten results

1. 30–Michael Waltrip
2. 34–Todd Bodine
3. 31–Steve Grissom
4. 87–Joe Nemechek
5. 16–Jeff Green
6. 25–Hermie Sadler
7. 8–Jeff Burton
8. 44–David Green
9. 14–Terry Labonte
10. 59–Robert Pressley

=== Mountain Dew 400 ===
The Mountain Dew 400 was held April 10 at Hickory Motor Speedway. Ernie Irvan won the pole.

Top ten results

1. 31–Steve Grissom
2. 99–Ricky Craven
3. 87–Joe Nemechek
4. 6–Tommy Houston
5. 34–Todd Bodine
6. 44–David Green
7. 19–Tom Peck
8. 63–Chuck Bown
9. 25–Hermie Sadler
10. 9–Mike Wallace

Failed to qualify: Charlie Brown, Troy Beebe, Nathan Buttke, Tim Fedewa, Jerry Glanville, Eddie Goodson, Tom Hessert Jr., Robert Huffman, Mike McCurry, Roy Payne, Alan Russell, #23 Kenny Gragg

- None of the current full time Cup regulars that started (four) finished the race. Bobby Hamilton finished 23rd (crashed out), Mark Martin finished 26th (crashed out), Ernie Irvan finished 27th (crashed out), and Dale Jarrett finished 29th (engine failure).

=== Roses Stores 300 ===
The Roses Stores 300 was held May 1 at Orange County Speedway. Jeff Green won the pole.

Top ten results

1. 2–Ward Burton
2. 92–Larry Pearson
3. 31–Steve Grissom
4. 97–Joe Bessey
5. 75–Butch Miller
6. 63–Chuck Bown
7. 72–Tracy Leslie
8. 8–Jeff Burton
9. 08–Bobby Dotter
10. 19–Tom Peck

Failed to qualify: #82 Jerry Glanville

=== Miller Genuine Draft 500 ===
The Miller Genuine Draft 500 was held May 8 at Martinsville Speedway. Butch Miller won the pole.

Top ten results

1. 2–Ward Burton
2. 14–Bobby Labonte
3. 99–Ricky Craven
4. 25–Hermie Sadler
5. 63–Chuck Bown
6. 44–David Green
7. 8–Jeff Burton
8. 31–Steve Grissom
9. 74–Jack Sprague
10. 1–Rodney Combs

Failed to qualify: Tom Hessert Jr.

- Robert Pressley and Ed Berrier were involved in a rough driving incident on the track. They hit each other's cars numerous times. NASCAR officials ruled that both drivers were equally at fault. Therefore, they were both ejected from the race. Pressley finished 22nd and Berrier finished 23rd.
- This was the final Busch Grand National race victory for manufacturer Buick.

=== Laneco 200 ===
The Laneco 200 was held May 23 at Nazareth Speedway. Todd Bodine won the pole.

Top ten results

1. 59–Robert Pressley
2. 31–Steve Grissom
3. 2–Ward Burton
4. 44–David Green
5. 75–Butch Miller
6. 63–Chuck Bown
7. 55–Tim Fedewa
8. 99–Ricky Craven
9. 51–Mike McLaughlin
10. 1–Rodney Combs
- This was Pressley's penultimate Busch Grand National race victory.

=== Champion 300 ===
The Champion 300 was held May 29 at Charlotte Motor Speedway. Tracy Leslie won the pole.

Top ten results

1. 30–Michael Waltrip
2. 4–Ernie Irvan
3. 32–Dale Jarrett
4. 52–Ken Schrader
5. 59–Robert Pressley
6. 29–Phil Parsons
7. 23–Chad Little
8. 63–Chuck Bown
9. 8–Jeff Burton
10. 0–Rick Mast
- Ward Burton looked to have this race won, but his team mistakenly put the tires on the wrong side of the car during the last set of pit stops, which took away his car's handling for the final 16 laps and contributed to his 11th-place finish.

=== Goodwrench/Delco 200 ===
The Goodwrench/Delco 200 was held June 5 at Dover International Speedway. Ward Burton won the pole.

Top ten results

1. 34–Todd Bodine
2. 23–Chad Little
3. 8–Jeff Burton
4. 32–Dale Jarrett
5. 29–Phil Parsons
6. 92–Larry Pearson
7. 59–Robert Pressley
8. 99–Ricky Craven
9. 64–Jimmy Spencer
10. 14–Terry Labonte

=== Carolina Pride/Budweiser 250 ===
The Carolina Pride/Budweiser 250 was held June 12 at Myrtle Beach Speedway. Ward Burton won the pole.

Top ten results

1. 8–Jeff Burton
2. 2–Ward Burton
3. 87–Joe Nemechek
4. 59–Robert Pressley
5. 31–Steve Grissom
6. 34–Todd Bodine
7. 72–Tracy Leslie
8. 44–David Green
9. 27–Roy Payne
10. 98–Jim Bown
- This was the first time brothers finished 1–2 in a Busch Grand National race.

=== Fay's 150 ===
The Fay's 150 was held June 26 at Watkins Glen International. Ernie Irvan won the pole.

Top ten results

1. 11–Bill Elliott
2. 14–Terry Labonte
3. 2–Ward Burton
4. 87–Joe Nemechek
5. 34–Todd Bodine
6. 63–Chuck Bown
7. 72–Tracy Leslie
8. 19–Tom Peck
9. 08–Bobby Dotter
10. 9–Mike Wallace

Failed to qualify: #5N Barney McRae, #24 Eddie Sharp, #69 Jeff Spraker, #93 Troy Beebe

- This would be Elliott's only Busch Series victory
- The race started under the Green and Yellow flags to allow the track to finish drying.

=== Havoline Formula 3 250 ===
The Havoline Formula 3 250 was held July 4 at The Milwaukee Mile, the first Busch Grand National race at the track in 8 years. Bobby Dotter won the pole.

Top ten results

1. 31–Steve Grissom
2. 92–Larry Pearson
3. 25–Hermie Sadler
4. 44–David Green
5. 19–Tom Peck
6. 8–Jeff Burton
7. 55–Tim Fedewa
8. 1–Rodney Combs
9. 87–Joe Nemechek
10. 99–Ricky Craven
- This was Davey Allison's final Busch Grand National race. He would finish 27th after completing 200 of the 250 laps due to engine failure.

=== Fram Filter 500K ===
The Fram Filter 500K was held July 24 at Talladega Superspeedway. Bill Elliott won the pole.

Top ten results

1. 3–Dale Earnhardt
2. 20–Randy LaJoie
3. 14–Terry Labonte
4. 72–Tracy Leslie
5. 11–Bill Elliott
6. 30–Michael Waltrip
7. 59–Robert Pressley
8. 48–Sterling Marlin
9. 25–Hermie Sadler
10. 99–Ricky Craven
- Richard Lasater flipped in this race.
- This was Dale Earnhardt's penultimate Busch Grand National victory.

=== Kroger 200 ===
The Kroger 200 was held July 31 at Indianapolis Raceway Park. Ernie Irvan won the pole.

Top ten results

1. 72–Tracy Leslie
2. 44–David Green
3. 14–Terry Labonte
4. 2–Ward Burton
5. 55–Tim Fedewa
6. 9–Mike Wallace
7. 99–Ricky Craven
8. 8–Jeff Burton
9. 38–Bobby Hamilton
10. 6–Tommy Houston
- This was Tracy Leslie's only Busch Grand National race victory.

=== Detroit Gasket 200 ===
The Detroit Gasket 200 was held August 14 at Michigan International Speedway. Bill Elliott won the pole.

Top ten results

1. 60–Mark Martin
2. 59–Robert Pressley
3. 14–Terry Labonte
4. 31–Steve Grissom
5. 75–Rick Wilson
6. 99–Ricky Craven
7. 34–Todd Bodine
8. 52–Ken Schrader
9. 74–Jack Sprague
10. 63–Chuck Bown
- This was the Busch Grand National Series debut for Bill Elliott's nephew, the late Casey Elliott. He finished 1 lap down in 20th.
- This was also the Busch Grand National Series debut of Johnny Benson. On the backstretch, after he completed the 1st lap he tumbled end over end and finished 40th.
- Dale Earnhardt after finishing 2nd on track had an issue in post-race inspection. He was disqualified for the car having an Illegal carburetor and placed in last (41st).

=== NE Chevy 250 ===
The NE Chevy 250 was held August 22 at New Hampshire International Speedway. Joe Nemechek won the pole.

Top ten results

1. 59–Robert Pressley
2. 87–Joe Nemechek
3. 08–Bobby Dotter
4. 31–Steve Grissom
5. 61–Tommy Houston
6. 55–Tim Fedewa
7. 25–Hermie Sadler
8. 99–Ricky Craven
9. 44–David Green
10. 92–Larry Pearson
- This was Pressley's last career NASCAR Busch Series victory.

=== Food City 250 ===
The Food City 250 was held August 27 at Bristol Motor Speedway. Steve Grissom won the pole.

Top ten results

1. 34–Todd Bodine
2. 87–Joe Nemechek
3. 08–Bobby Dotter
4. 9–Mike Wallace
5. 63–Chuck Bown
6. 99–Ricky Craven
7. 31–Steve Grissom
8. 6–Tommy Houston
9. 79–Dave Rezendes
10. 75–Rick Wilson

=== Gatorade 200 ===
The Gatorade 200 was held September 4 at Darlington Raceway. Ricky Craven won the pole.

Top ten results

1. 60–Mark Martin
2. 20–Randy LaJoie
3. 23–Chad Little
4. 87–Joe Nemechek
5. 31–Steve Grissom
6. 72–Tracy Leslie
7. 22–Ed Berrier
8. 9–Mike Wallace
9. 99–Ricky Craven
10. 0–Rick Mast

Failed to qualify: #24 Eddie Sharp

=== Autolite 250 ===
The Autolite 250 was held September 10 at Richmond International Raceway. Chuck Bown won the pole.

Top ten results

1. 60–Mark Martin
2. 72–Tracy Leslie
3. 25–Hermie Sadler
4. 0–Tommy Houston
5. 11–Bill Elliott
6. 08–Bobby Dotter
7. 44–David Green
8. 97–Joe Bessey
9. 32–Dale Jarrett
10. 31–Steve Grissom

Failed to qualify: #1 Rodney Combs, #5 Richard Lasater, #6 Tommy Houston, #9 Mike Wallace, #12 David Bonnett, #15 Clay Brown, #16 Chad Chaffin, #17 Darrell Waltrip, #35 Shawna Robinson, #39 Mike Hovis, #46 Steve Hoddick, #57 Jason Keller, #73 Brian Ross, #79 Dave Rezendes, #94 Casey Elliott

Driver changes: #0 Rick Mast (driven by Tommy Houston, was relieved by Mast mid race, finished in 4th place), #64 Jimmy Spencer (driven by Mike Wallace to 33rd place)

=== SplitFire 200 ===
The SplitFire 200 was held September 18 at Dover International Speedway. Terry Labonte won the pole.

Top ten results

1. 34–Todd Bodine
2. 99–Ricky Craven
3. 72–Tracy Leslie
4. 74–Jack Sprague
5. 44–David Green
6. 10–Jimmy Spencer
7. 31–Steve Grissom
8. 29–Phil Parsons
9. 9–Mike Wallace
10. 97–Joe Bessey

=== Polaroid 300 ===
The Polaroid 300 was held October 2 at Orange County Speedway. Joe Nemechek won the pole.

Top ten results

1. 25–Hermie Sadler
2. 99–Ricky Craven
3. 63–Chuck Bown
4. 74–Randy LaJoie
5. 08–Bobby Dotter
6. 44–David Green
7. 19–Tom Peck
8. 72–Tracy Leslie
9. 4–Jack Sprague
10. 97–Joe Bessey
- This was Hermie Sadler's first Busch Grand National Series race victory.

=== All Pro 300 ===
The All Pro 300 was held October 9 at Charlotte Motor Speedway. Bobby Dotter won the pole.

Top ten results

1. 60–Mark Martin
2. 30–Michael Waltrip
3. 3–Dale Earnhardt
4. 11–Bill Elliott
5. 34–Todd Bodine
6. 14–Terry Labonte
7. 2–Ward Burton
8. 63–Chuck Bown
9. 08–Bobby Dotter
10. 9–Mike Wallace

Failed to qualify: Dirk Stephens, #07 George Crenshaw, #10 Jimmy Spencer, #17 Darrell Waltrip, #22 Ed Berrier, #24 Eddie Sharp, #28 Tim Steele, #35 Shawna Robinson, #36 Tim Bender, #56 Brandon Sperling, #66 Nathan Buttke, #84 Robert Powell, #91 Stanton Barrett, #91 Steve Perry, #98 Jim Bown

- This was Robert Pressley's last race for the #59 Daniel Welch owned team. He fell out of the race after completing 16 laps due to engine failure finishing 43rd.
- This was also the last Busch Grand National start for Casey Elliott, nephew of Bill Elliott. He crashed out of the race on lap 16 finishing last (44th)
- This race featured a halftime break.

=== Advance Auto Parts 500 ===
The Advance Auto Parts 500 was held October 17 at Martinsville Speedway. Joe Nemechek won the pole.

Top ten results

1. 63–Chuck Bown
2. 31–Steve Grissom
3. 99–Ricky Craven
4. 75–Jimmy Hensley
5. 19–Tom Peck
6. 44–David Green
7. 9–Mike Wallace
8. 72–Tracy Leslie
9. 74–Ernie Irvan
10. 59–Dennis Setzer

Failed to qualify: Steve Darne, Pat Davison, Tommy Ellis, Jamie James, Buckshot Jones, Steve McEachern, #07 George Crenshaw, #12 David Bonnett, #48 Tom Hessert Jr., #93 Troy Beebe

- This was Chuck Bown's final Busch Grand National Series win.
- This was Setzer's first race for the #59 Daniel Welch owned team.
- Robert Pressley made his debut for the #0 Richard Jackson owned team. He had 2 spins in the race and finished 15 laps down in 23rd.

=== AC-Delco 200 ===
The AC-Delco 200 was held October 23 at North Carolina Speedway. Ward Burton won the pole.

Top ten results

1. 60–Mark Martin
2. 2–Ward Burton
3. 97–Joe Bessey
4. 34–Todd Bodine
5. 14–Terry Labonte
6. 72–Tracy Leslie
7. 31–Steve Grissom
8. 20–Randy LaJoie
9. 0–Robert Pressley
10. 99–Ricky Craven

Failed to qualify: Tommy Ellis, Stevie Reeves, #29 Phil Parsons, #57 Jason Keller, #59 Dennis Setzer, #74 Johnny Benson

- During the race there was a dust-up between Joe Bessey and Jimmy Spencer. It later became a brawl, and led to Spencer being fined plus suspended for the rest of the year from the series.

=== The Pantry 500 ===
The Pantry 500 was held November 7 at Hickory Motor Speedway. Bobby Labonte won the pole.

Top ten results

1. 00–Johnny Rumley
2. 63–Chuck Bown
3. 6–Tommy Houston
4. 99–Ricky Craven
5. 05–Tommy Ellis
6. 08–Bobby Dotter
7. 32–Dale Jarrett
8. 66–Nathan Buttke
9. 31–Steve Grissom
10. 34–Todd Bodine

Failed to qualify: Steve Darne, Pat Davison, Mike Dillon, Andy Houston, Buckshot Jones, Mike McCurry, Steve McEachern, Ronnie Silver, #5 Richard Lasater, #12 David Bonnett, #16 Chad Chaffin, #21 Tommy Sigmon, #35 Shawna Robinson, #55 Tim Fedewa, #56 Brandon Sperling, #97 Joe Bessey

- Because David Green finished 17th, with his 9th-place finish Steve Grissom clinched the championship with 1 race remaining.
- This was the final Busch Grand National victory for manufacturer Oldsmobile.
- This was also the final race Neil Bonnett would call on TV (TNN) before his death in February 1994.
- This race was called 500 because there was a 200 lap late model race in addition to the Busch Grand National race.

=== Slick 50 300 ===
The Slick 50 300 was held November 13 at Atlanta Motor Speedway. Mark Martin won the pole. This race was delayed 8 months due to a blizzard.

Top ten results

1. 2–Ward Burton
2. 92–Larry Pearson
3. 30–Michael Waltrip
4. 7–Harry Gant
5. 70–Sterling Marlin
6. 87–Joe Nemechek
7. 0–Robert Pressley
8. 9–Mike Wallace
9. 31–Steve Grissom
10. 19–Tom Peck
- This was Ward Burton's final Busch Grand National race victory.
- This was Neil Bonnett's last Busch Grand National race before his death in February 1994. He crashed out on lap 84, finishing 35th driving for Dale Earnhardt. He gave a funny TV interview stating "We were supposed to go hunting next week. I don't think I'm gonna go, Dale might shoot me!"

== Final Full Drivers' Championship ==
(key) Bold – Pole position awarded by time. Italics – Pole position set by owner's points. * – Most laps led.

Pos	Driver	DAY	CAR	RCH	DAR	BRI	HCY	ROU	MAR	NAZ	CLT	DOV	MYB	GLN	MIL	TAL	IRP	MCH	NHA	BRI	DAR	RCH	DOV	ROU	CLT	MAR	CAR	HCY	ATL	Pts
1	Steve Grissom	11	4	17	14	3	1	3	8	2	26	17	5	13	1	25	20	4	4	7	5	10	7	27	28	2	7	9	9	3846
2	Ricky Craven	22	14	6	27	19	2	28	3	8	25	8	13	37	10	10	7	6	8	6	**9**	28	2	2	26	3	10	4	15	3593
3	David Green	8	5	4	6	8	6	14	6	4	16	11	8	35	4	24	2	18	9	29	12	7	5	6	17	6	38	17	33	3584
4	Chuck Bown	13	10	18	12	25	8	6	5	6	8	16	12	6	17	26	22	10	27	5	20	**14**	23	3*	8	1	13	2	36	3532
5	Joe Nemechek	9	11	2	22	4	3	20	11	19	40	26	3	4	9	28	11	22	**2***	2	4	11	24	**14**	27	**14***	36	22	6	3443
6	Ward Burton	21	24	32	4	**17**	16	1*	1*	3*	11	**35**	**2**	3	19	22	4	24	25	24	23	22	30	25	7	17	**2**	12	1*	3413
7	Bobby Dotter	25	15	14	38	12	11	9	17	13	21	12	18	9	**14**	11	23	21	3	3	11	6	14	5	**9**	13	11	6	37	3406
8	Robert Pressley	31	2	5	1*	10	25	29	22	1	5	7	4	26	22	7	18	2	1	21	28	26	12	20	43	23	9	26	7	3389
9	Todd Bodine	41	33	9	5	2	5	22	18	**11**	31	1*	6	5	11	38	19	7	40	1*	27	18	1	18	5	11	4	10	34	3387
10	Hermie Sadler **(R)**	17	13	11	16	6	9	13	4	30	29	30	11	14	3	9	13	28	7	26	21	3	13	1	31	15	19	14	16	3362
11	Tracy Leslie	5	37	25	7	13	13	7	24	25	**34**	28	7	7	15	4	1	36	28	25	6	2	3	8	23	8	6	13	30	3336
12	Mike Wallace	20	18	26	19	22	10	11	15	16	20	15	24	10	16	35	6	15	26	4	8	33	9	22	10	7	20	15	8	3213
13	Tom Peck	15	6	7	32	15	7	10	25	14	12	14	17	8	5	18	14	19	19	18	19	36	20	7	41	5	32	18	10	3211
14	Jeff Burton	6	31	3	39	7	20	8	7	28	9	3	1*	33	6*	21	8	27	24	33	24	35	11	23	18	22	22	23	39	3030
15	Rodney Combs	14	23	19	18	23	21	12	10	10	19	18	22	16	8	14	25	14	11	20	26	DNQ	25	19	19	19	15	25	14	2969
16	Tommy Houston	40	34	15	26	18	4	23	28	27	39	21	14	20	30	13	10	23	5	8	31	4	27	29	13	31	31	3	17	2852
17	Joe Bessey **(R)**	18	21	DNQ	23	30	12	4	9	29		22	15	24	18	20	16	16	23	12	14	8	10	10	16	20	3	DNQ	25	2834
18	Tim Fedewa **(R)**	24	32	16	41	16	DNQ	18	12	7		20	25	11	7	12	5	38	6	13	15	17	15	12	25	12	17	DNQ	24	2775
19	Jack Sprague	44	12	20	24	21	19	21	9	12	24	27	16	21	32	15	17	9	20	23	33	13	4	9						2429
20	Terry Labonte	4	39	12	3	9					37	10		2		3	3	3	29	30	18	32	**26**		6	30	5		13	2399
21	Richard Lasater	10	19	24	20	11	17	15	29	32	14	34	28	18	23	32		31	21	28	42	DNQ	16	11	21	24	40	DNQ	19	2339
22	Roy Payne	26	16	28	29	24	DNQ	25	16	20		25	9	19	25	36	28	32		19	41	15	17	24	15	18	18	21	DNQ	2276
23	Shawna Robinson	32	27	34	28	14	15	27	30	22		23	32	22	34	40	12	26	34	17	30	DNQ	21	23	DNQ	32	37	DNQ	42	1950
24	Mark Martin	42	1*	1*	30	27	26				35					33		1*			1*	1*			1*		1*		**26**	1744
25	Larry Pearson	35		27	8	34		2			28	6			2	27	21	12	10				29		34				2	1662
26	Jim Bown	34	42	13	11	32	28	26			17		10			30		30		27	36	24		15	DNQ		21	29	32	1564
27	Harry Gant	3	7	33	2	26					38	31			29	41		13		16	32		34		35		29		4	1526
28	Nathan Buttke **(R)**		30	DNQ	31	29	DNQ	17	26	34			19		24		31		35		17	27	31	16	DNQ	29	24	8		1490
29	Bill Elliott	29			10						18			1*		**5**		**34**	15		38	5			4				28	1276
30	Michael Waltrip	33			15	1*					1					6	29				34	29			2				3	1240
31	Butch Miller	12	9	10	37	28	14	5	**20**	5	15																			1182
32	Chad Little				33						7	2				29	27	33	37	22	3				14		41		23	1171
33	Jason Keller **(R)**		8	DNQ	17	20	22				27		21		13	37				34	16	DNQ			38		DNQ		21	1137
34	Dale Jarrett				9		29				3	4				31				31		9			37		16	7		1130
35	Ken Schrader	**2**									4	32				19		8			13				20		33		11	1066
36	Randy LaJoie															2				32	2	12		4	12		8		27	1045
37	Dale Earnhardt	1*	3								36	13				1*		41	42		40				3				QL	989
38	Dave Rezendes	23	41	22							32			38						9	25	DNQ			24	25	27	16		949
39	Ernie Irvan	39					**27***				2			**36**		17	**24**	35							32	9		27		901
40	Jeff Green	43	20	29	40	5	30	**16**	27	18						42	32													894
41	Sterling Marlin	28									42					8		11			22	23			11				5	864
42	Jimmy Spencer	37				31					33	9				34				11	39	QL	6		DNQ		12			838
43	Phil Parsons	DNQ		36	35						6	5		32				39					8		22		DNQ		40	813
44	Rick Wilson											36				39		5		10	37	16	28		39				41	722
45	Ed Berrier	19	26		36				23							QL					7				DNQ		26		29	647
46	Troy Beebe	30					DNQ	30		23		33	26	DNQ	36		26							17		DNQ				641
47	Bobby Hamilton						23		31			29					9					21	32						38	594
48	Johnny Rumley							19					31							15						26		1		559
49	Rick Mast	DNQ		**8**	34						10										10	QL			33					535
50	Darrell Waltrip	7		30											12	16		37				DNQ			DNQ					513
51	Michael Ritch **(R)**		17	21					19													30					25			479
52	Davey Allison	36	35	31	13						30				27															462
53	Dennis Setzer										22															10	DNQ	11	22	458
54	Eddie Goodson			23			DNQ	24					30				30							28						410
55	Sammy Swindell				21							19			20		34													370
56	Ronald Cooper																									16	14		12	363
57	David Bonnett								21				20					17				DNQ				DNQ	39	DNQ		361
58	Johnny Benson																	40							30			19	18	331
59	Clay Brown			DNQ									29		28							DNQ				21	42			292
60	Bobby Labonte								2																			**24***		261
61	Hut Stricklin																		41							27	34		31	253
62	Tommy Sigmon						24		32				23															DNQ		252
63	Joe Ruttman	38				33					13																			237
64	Tom Hessert Jr. **(R)**		38	DNQ			DNQ		DNQ	26		24	DNQ													DNQ				225
65	Randy MacDonald	16																					18							224
66	Chad Chaffin		29	DNQ																		DNQ		30			30	DNQ		222
67	Jerry Glanville		40				DNQ	DNQ					27		26														Wth	210
68	Eddie Sharp		28											DNQ						14	DNQ				DNQ					200
69	Jimmy Hensley																								42	4				197
70	Billy Standridge															23											23			188
71	Alan Russell **(R)**	DNQ	25	DNQ	25		DNQ																							176
72	Robert Huffman						DNQ				41										35				29					174
73	Robert Powell										23										29				DNQ					170
74	Jeff Purvis	DNQ																				34							20	164
75	Pete Silva																									28		28		158
76	Tommy Ellis																									DNQ	DNQ	5		155
77	Tim Steele																	29				31			DNQ					146
78	Curtis Markham			35						17				25					16											146
79	David Donohue									31				30																143
80	Elton Sawyer																					25			36					143
81	Casey Elliott																	20				DNQ			44					134
82	Barry Bostick		36																								28			134
83	Glenn Jarrett																							13						124
84	Roger Sawyer								14																					121
85	Robbie Stanley																15													118
86	Ed Ferree													17																112
87	Jimmy Cope						18						DNQ																	109
88	Steve Perry																						19		DNQ					106
89	Greg Clark																					19								106
90	George Crenshaw																								DNQ	DNQ		20		103
91	Brandon Sperling																					20			DNQ			DNQ		103
92	Robbie Reiser														21															100
93	Mark Whitaker																							21						100
94	Pat Davison																						22			DNQ		DNQ		97
95	Andy Hillenburg		22																											97
96	Morgan Shepherd																	25												88
97	Ashton Lewis													27																82
98	Brett Bodine													28																79
99	Kenny Gragg						DNQ																					30		73
100	Bob Brevak														31															70
101	Scott Lagasse													31																70
102	Rusty Wallace														33															64
103	Eric Gordon																33													64
104	Larry Carroll																						33							64
105	Stanton Barrett																								DNQ		35			58
106	Neil Bonnett																												35	58
107	Bob Dotter														35															58
108	Mike Garvey														40															52
109	Bobby Hillin Jr.																								40					43
110	Page Jones **(R)**										43																			34
111	Mike McLaughlin									9				12					22											
112	Mike Stefanik									15				29					39											
113	Martin Truex Sr.									21									13											
114	Kelly Moore													23					12											
115	Bobby Dragon													34					18											
116	Dick McCabe													15					44											
117	Jeff Barry	27																	36											
118	Andy Santerre																		14											
119	Jamie Aube																		17											
120	Ken Wallace Jr. **(R)**									24																				
121	Reggie Ruggiero																		30											
122	Gary Clark																		31											
123	Tom Bolles																		32											
124	Robbie Crouch																		33											
125	Jeff Spraker									33				DNQ																
126	Stub Fadden																		38											
127	Brian Ross																		43			DNQ								
128	Scott Herberg	DNQ																												
129	Chad Mader	DNQ																												
130	Tony Siscone	DNQ																												
131	Daniel Rodgers	DNQ																												
132	Mike McCurry						DNQ						DNQ															DNQ		
133	Mike Hovis												DNQ									DNQ								
134	Barney McRae													DNQ																
135	Steve Hoddick																					DNQ								
136	Tim Bender																								DNQ					
137	Dirk Stephens																								DNQ					
138	Jamie James																									DNQ				
139	Buckshot Jones																									DNQ		DNQ		
140	Steve Darne																									DNQ		DNQ		
141	Steve McEachern																									DNQ		DNQ		
142	Stevie Reeves																										DNQ			
143	Mike Dillon																											DNQ		
144	Andy Houston																											DNQ		
145	Ronnie Silver																											DNQ		
146	Dave Mader III																												QL	
Pos	Driver	DAY	CAR	RCH	DAR	BRI	HCY	ROU	MAR	NAZ	CLT	DOV	MYB	GLN	MIL	TAL	IRP	MCH	NHA	BRI	DAR	RCH	DOV	ROU	CLT	MAR	CAR	HCY	ATL	Pts

== Rookie of the Year ==
Hermie Sadler won his first career race and the Rookie of the Year title in 1993, finishing in the top-ten eight times and ended the season tenth in the final standings. He was followed by Joe Bessey, Tim Fedewa, and Roy Payne. Due to sponsor issues, Nathan Buttke and Jason Keller did not attempt the full schedule.

== See also ==
- 1993 NASCAR Winston Cup Series
- 1993 NASCAR Winston West Series
