= Robert Pressley =

American racing driver

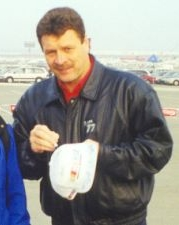
- Pressley in 1999
- Born: Robert William Pressley; April 8, 1959 (age 67); Asheville, North Carolina, U.S.
- Achievements: 2002 Florida Dodge Dealers 250 Winner; Led Busch Series in wins in 1992; 1988 Greenville-Pickens Speedway Late Model Champion

NASCAR Cup Series career
- 205 races run over 9 years
- Best finish: 25th (2000, 2001)
- First race: 1994 Daytona 500 (Daytona)
- Last race: 2002 Daytona 500 (Daytona)
Wins	Top tens	Poles
0	11	0

NASCAR O'Reilly Auto Parts Series career
- 244 races run over 12 years
- Best finish: 3rd (1991)
- First race: 1983 Miller Time 300 (Charlotte)
- Last race: 2005 O'Reilly Challenge (Texas)
- First win: 1989 Texas Pete 200 (Rougemont)
- Last win: 1993 NE Chevy 250 (Loudon)
Wins	Top tens	Poles
10	76	6

NASCAR FedEx Freight Truck Series career
- 69 races run over 3 years
- Best finish: 7th (2002)
- First race: 2002 Florida Dodge Dealers 250 (Daytona)
- Last race: 2005 Ford 200 (Homestead)
- First win: 2002 Florida Dodge Dealers 250 (Daytona)
- Last win: 2002 Michigan 200 (Michigan)
Wins	Top tens	Poles
2	27	0
- Statistics up to date as of April 17, 2013.

Robert William Pressley (born April 8, 1959) is an American former NASCAR driver who previously served as the promoter at Kingsport Speedway in Kingsport, Tennessee. Pressley owns the restaurant Celebrity's Hotdogs in Asheville, North Carolina, and served as a county commissioner in Buncombe County, North Carolina, from 2016 to 2022.

== Early life and career ==
Pressley attended Enka High School in Candler, North Carolina in the late 1970s. He spent 14 years working for Coca-Cola, starting as a delivery truck driver, which supported his racing. As his father, also named Robert, was a short track racer in Asheville, the younger Pressley followed a sports career. His brother, Charley, has been a long-time crew chief in the NASCAR level. Pressley began racing at New Asheville Speedway, where he won five track championships, including a record four in a row. He also won a championship at Greenville-Pickens Speedway and won more than 150 late model feature races in the Southeast during the 1980s. In 1984, Pressley made his NASCAR debut in the Busch Series at Charlotte Motor Speedway, finishing 26th. Five years later, Pressley ran a limited schedule in the Busch Series in a self-fielded car run in partnership with NBA player Brad Daugherty, and won in just his twelfth series start at Orange County Speedway. He ran full seasons from 1991–1994, his best year coming in 1991 when he finished third in points. In 1990, Pressley was involved in Michael Waltrip's Bristol crash in which Waltrip tapped Pressley in the right rear corner sending Waltrip into a gate disintegrating the car on impact.

== Winston Cup Series ==
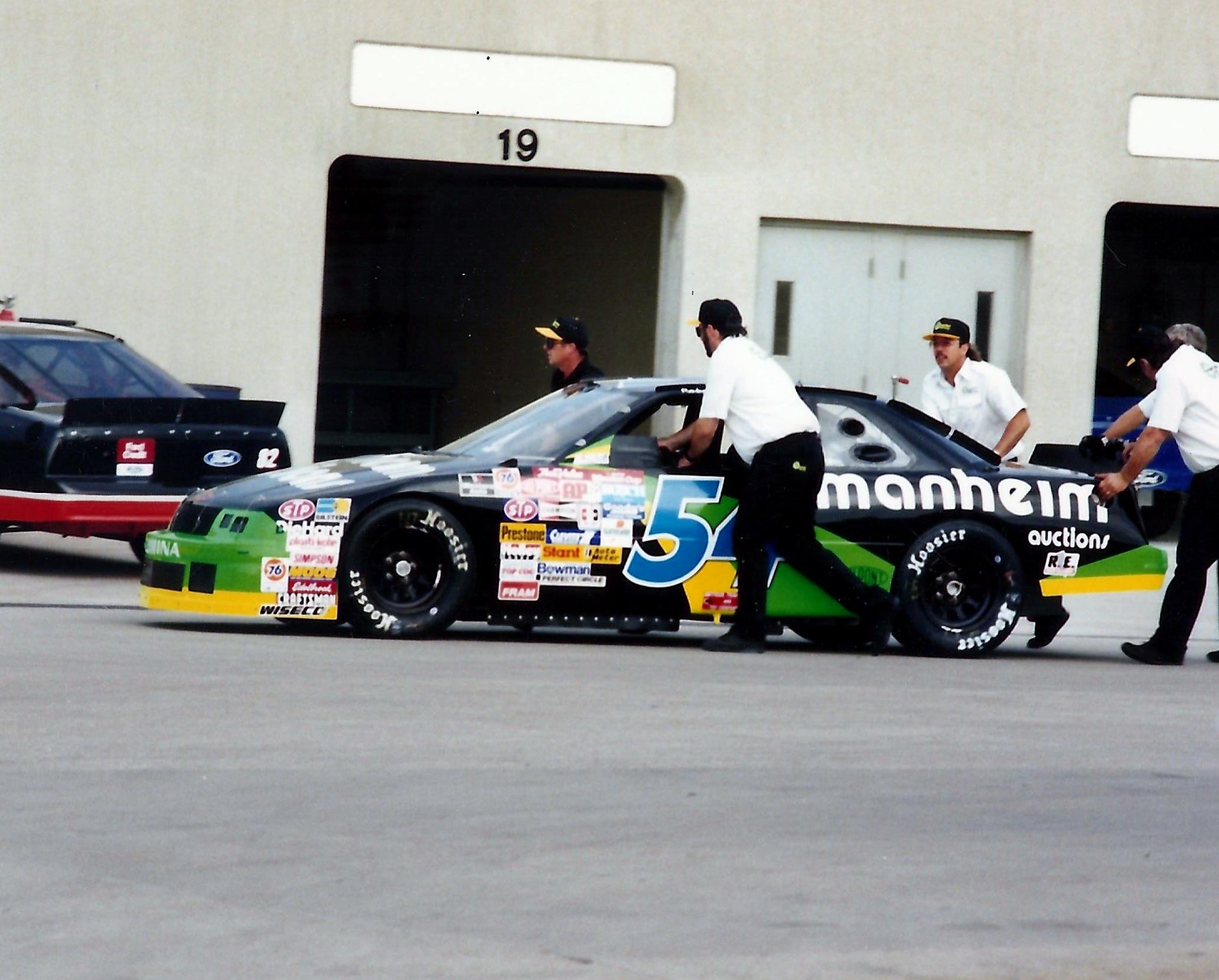
Pressley in 1994.

In 1994, he ran three races in the Winston Cup Series in a car sponsored by Manheim Auctions, his best finish being a 31st at Charlotte.

In 1995, Pressley took over for the retired Harry Gant in the No. 33 car owned by Leo Jackson Motorsports in Cup. He posted one top-ten finish and was runner-up to Ricky Craven for Rookie of the Year. The following year, he put together two top-five finishes. Jackson was retiring and sold his operation to crew chief Andy Petree. After Pressley ran just one race for his new owner, he was released, but able to hook onto a ride with Diamond Ridge Motorsports. Pressley ran just ten races for Diamond Ridge in 1997, including the Daytona 500, in which his car flipped on its nose acrobatically in the first few laps.

Pressley posted a season-best finish of fourteenth, when he was suddenly fired from the ride. While he waited for a Cup ride to appear, Pressley returned to the Busch ranks, running the No. 47 Chevrolet for ST Motorsports, and finished out the year with three top tens. Over in Cup, he joined the No. 77 Jasper Motorsports team.

Following his abbreviated Cup run in 1997, Pressley returned full-time in 1998 with the Jasper team, where he posted a then career-best third-place finish at Texas Motor Speedway. Despite being replaced temporarily by Hut Stricklin due to injuries, Pressley finished 32nd in points that year. 1999 was a struggle however, as Pressley and company failed to qualify six times that season, and often had trouble finishing races. Following the addition of Ryan Pemberton in 2000, Pressley was able to increase his position in points to 25th. In 2001, he had five top-tens, nearly won the inaugural Tropicana 400 before finishing in second, and finished 25th in points handing the driving duties to the car for the road course events to Boris Said. Robert Pressley, although competitive in some races, struggled with consistency, and would part ways with Jasper at the conclusion of the 2001 season.

In 2002, Pressley had a one race deal with Melling Racing for the Daytona 500 and locked himself in by qualifying speed on Pole Day, Qualifying fifth overall with the same car they had qualified third or better on the 2001 restrictor plate tracks. After receiving sponsorship from Brand Source, he had an engine problem at the end of the race. When he blew up, his car was nearly destroyed on pit road as an accident happened on the tri-oval and Michael Waltrip's car came across onto pit road, also nearly hitting the pace car as well. He finished 22nd in what was the last race for Melling Racing. His final Cup attempt came in July 2003, when he was named to drive the No. 4 Morgan-McClure Motorsports Pontiac in the Brickyard 400, but failed to qualify.

== Truck and Busch Series (2002–2005) ==
At the end of 2001, Pressley was released from Jasper and moved to the Craftsman Truck Series, joining Bobby Hamilton Racing to drive the No. 18 Dodge in place of Joe Ruttman. He won in his first Truck Series start, the Florida Dodge Dealers 250 at Daytona International Speedway in February 2002, finishing ahead of Ted Musgrave and Brian Rose. He was the second driver in series history to win in his first start, after Mike Skinner in 1995. He won again in the Michigan 200 at Michigan International Speedway in July, leading 74 of 100 laps and beating Jason Leffler by 0.102 seconds, and finished seventh in points.

In 2003, Pressley moved to HT Motorsports to drive the No. 59 Dodge. A late entry for the season opener at Daytona, he qualified second and finished third in one of the closest finishes in series history. He finished twelfth in points.

For 2004 he returned to the Busch Series to drive the No. 47 Clorox Ford for ST Motorsports, with Steve Plattenberger as crew chief, and finished fifteenth in points with two top-ten finishes. He rejoined HT Motorsports for the full 2005 Truck Series schedule in the No. 59 Dodge, with Fred Graves as crew chief and Melling as sponsor for the Daytona opener, and finished twentieth in the standings. He retired from full-time racing in 2005.

== Later career ==
In 2004, Pressley opened the restaurant Celebrity's Hotdogs near the Bent Creek area of Asheville, North Carolina. In June 2008, he practiced and qualified the STP/Kingsford Ford at the Milwaukee Mile for Marcos Ambrose, who was in California preparing for his Sprint Cup Series debut and returned to drive the Nationwide Series race, finishing 16th. He also worked as a driving coach. In 2011, he reopened Kingsport Speedway in Kingsport, Tennessee, as its promoter and brought NASCAR Whelen All-American Series sanctioning to the track. He left at the end of 2013.

== Political career ==
In 2016, Pressley, a Republican, was elected to the Buncombe County Board of Commissioners, winning an unexpired District 3 term with 56.71 percent of the vote. Dirty Mo Media described the result as one of the largest margins in the county's local election history. He served six years and lost his bid for reelection in 2022. As a commissioner he served on the county's Early Childhood Education and Development Fund Committee, the Tourism Development Authority, and the Metropolitan Sewerage District Board, and worked on projects including road infrastructure at Enka Commerce Park.

== Personal life ==
Pressley's son Coleman won the 2010 UARA-Stars championship and raced sporadically in NASCAR. Coleman became Joey Logano's spotter in 2021. His nephew Caleb Pressley is a blogger and podcaster for Barstool Sports.

== Motorsports career results ==
=== NASCAR ===
(key) (Bold – Pole position awarded by qualifying time. Italics – Pole position earned by points standings or practice time. * – Most laps led.)

==== Winston Cup Series ====
NASCAR Winston Cup Series results
Year	Team	No.	Make	1	2	3	4	5	6	7	8	9	10	11	12	13	14	15	16	17	18	19	20	21	22	23	24	25	26	27	28	29	30	31	32	33	34	35	36	NWCC	Pts	Ref
1994	Leo Jackson Motorsports	54	Chevy	DAY; 40	CAR	RCH	ATL	DAR	BRI	NWS	MAR	TAL	SON	CLT	DOV	POC	MCH	DAY	NHA; DNQ	POC	TAL	IND; DNQ	GLN	MCH; DNQ	BRI	DAR	RCH	DOV	MAR	NWS	CLT; 31	CAR	PHO	ATL; 35						57th	171	
1995	Leo Jackson Motorsports	33	Chevy	DAY; 26	CAR; 42	RCH; 35	ATL; 31	DAR; 30	BRI; 10	NWS; 18	MAR; 17	TAL; 18	SON; 30	CLT; 24	DOV; 19	POC; 37	MCH; 17	DAY; 11	NHA; 13	POC; 34	TAL; 27	IND; 28	GLN; 34	MCH; 18	BRI; 24	DAR; 17	RCH; 30	DOV; 14	MAR; 34	NWS; 33	CLT; 42	CAR; 29	PHO; 19	ATL; 41						29th	2663	
1996	Leo Jackson Motorsports	33	Chevy	DAY; 30	CAR; 26	RCH; 16	ATL; 27	DAR; 36	BRI; 17	NWS; 4	MAR; 34	TAL; 7	SON; 34	CLT; 33	DOV	POC; 33	MCH; 23	DAY; 17	NHA; 5	POC; 25	TAL; 31	IND; 30	GLN; 30	MCH; 41	BRI; 33	DAR; 27	RCH; 26	DOV; 32	MAR; 32	NWS; 33										32nd	2485	
1996	Andy Petree Racing	33	Chevy																												CLT; 32									32nd	2485	
1996	Diamond Ridge Motorsports	29	Chevy																													CAR; 37	PHO; 36	ATL; 33						32nd	2485	
1997	Diamond Ridge Motorsports	29	Chevy	DAY; 39	CAR; 37	RCH; 21	ATL; DNQ	DAR; 39	TEX; DNQ	BRI; 14	MAR; 23	SON; DNQ	TAL; 29	CLT	DOV	POC	MCH	CAL	DAY	NHA	POC	IND	GLN	MCH	BRI	DAR	RCH													43rd	984	
1997	Jasper Motorsports	77	Ford																									NHA; 43	DOV; 39	MAR; 38	CLT; 36	TAL; 27	CAR; 13	PHO; 38	ATL; DNQ					43rd	984	
1998	Jasper Motorsports	77	Ford	DAY; 32	CAR; 40	LVS; 23	ATL; 27	DAR; 20	BRI; 28	TEX; 3	MAR; 23	TAL; 31	CAL; 17	CLT; 16	DOV; 39	RCH; 41	MCH; 32	POC; 16	SON; 30	NHA; 34	POC; 32	IND; 29	GLN; 29	MCH; 24	BRI; 40	NHA; 12	DAR; 30	RCH; 43	DOV	MAR	CLT; 41	TAL; 26	DAY; DNQ	PHO; 17	CAR; 38	ATL; 28				32nd	2388	
1999	Jasper Motorsports	77	Ford	DAY; 19	CAR; 14	LVS; DNQ	ATL; DNQ	DAR; 15	TEX; 20	BRI; 40	MAR; 23	TAL; 22	CAL; 39	RCH; 27	CLT; 35	DOV; 40	MCH; 42	POC; 35	SON; 40	DAY; DNQ	NHA; DNQ	POC; 23	IND; 17	GLN; DNQ	MCH; 42	BRI; 43	DAR; 25	RCH; 39	NHA; 30	DOV; 23	MAR; 35	CLT; 24	TAL; DNQ	CAR; 29	PHO; 38	HOM; 37	ATL; 27			39th	2050	
2000	Jasper Motorsports	77	Ford	DAY; 20	CAR; 43	LVS; 21	ATL; 33	DAR; 18	BRI; 17	TEX; 26	MAR; 15	TAL; 23	CAL; 21	RCH; 35	CLT; 26	DOV; 26	MCH; 5	POC; 11	SON; 37	DAY; 17	NHA; 38	POC; 14	IND; 27	GLN; 26	MCH; 32	BRI; 37	DAR; 36	RCH; 37	NHA; 18	DOV; 14	MAR; 33	CLT; 35	TAL; 25	CAR; 12	PHO; 31	HOM; 16	ATL; 13			25th	3055	
2001	Jasper Motorsports	77	Ford	DAY; 14	CAR; 12	LVS; 16	ATL; 36	DAR; 15	BRI; 28	TEX; 43	MAR; 40	TAL; 24	CAL; 10	RCH; 32	CLT; 38	DOV; 22	MCH; 21	POC; 14	SON	DAY; 23	CHI; 2	NHA; 19	POC; 9	IND; 35	GLN	MCH; 14	BRI; 28	DAR; 38	RCH; 15	DOV; 37	KAN; 7	CLT; 25	MAR; 43	TAL; 27	PHO; 42	CAR; 13	HOM; 40	ATL; 21	NHA; 7	25th	3156	
2002	Melling Racing	92	Dodge	DAY; 22	CAR	LVS	ATL	DAR	BRI	TEX	MAR	TAL	CAL	RCH	CLT	DOV	POC	MCH	SON	DAY	CHI	NHA	POC	IND	GLN	MCH	BRI	DAR	RCH	NHA	DOV	KAN	TAL; DNQ	CLT	MAR	ATL	CAR	PHO	HOM	67th	97	
2003	Morgan–McClure Motorsports	4	Pontiac	DAY	CAR	LVS	ATL	DAR	BRI	TEX	TAL	MAR	CAL	RCH	CLT	DOV	POC	MCH	SON	DAY	CHI	NHA	POC	IND; DNQ	GLN	MCH	BRI	DAR	RCH	NHA	DOV	TAL	KAN	CLT	MAR	ATL	PHO	CAR	HOM	NA	-	

===== Daytona 500 =====
Year	Team	Manufacturer	Start	Finish
1994	Leo Jackson Motorsports	Chevrolet	19	40
1995	Leo Jackson Motorsports	Chevrolet	31	26
1996	Leo Jackson Motorsports	Chevrolet	25	30
1997	Diamond Ridge Motorsports	Chevrolet	19	39
1998	Jasper Motorsports	Ford	30	32
1999	Jasper Motorsports	Ford	15	19
2000	Jasper Motorsports	Ford	32	20
2001	Jasper Motorsports	Ford	39	14
2002	Melling Racing	Dodge	31	22

==== Busch Series ====
NASCAR Busch Series results
Year	Team	No.	Make	1	2	3	4	5	6	7	8	9	10	11	12	13	14	15	16	17	18	19	20	21	22	23	24	25	26	27	28	29	30	31	32	33	34	35	NBGNC	Pts	Ref
1984		52	Olds	DAY	RCH	CAR	HCY	MAR	DAR	ROU	NSV	LGY	MLW	DOV	CLT	SBO	HCY	ROU	SBO	ROU	HCY	IRP	LGY	SBO	BRI	DAR	RCH	NWS	CLT; 26	HCY	CAR	MAR							108th	0	
1989	Pressley Racing	59	Olds	DAY	CAR	MAR	HCY; 15	DAR	BRI; 19	NZH	SBO; 18	LAN; 12	NSV; 12	CLT	DOV	ROU; 9	LVL; 15	VOL; 13	MYB; 21	SBO; 26	HCY; 14	DUB; 10	IRP; 30	ROU; 1*	BRI; 20	DAR	RCH; 14	DOV	MAR; 12	CLT; 15	CAR	MAR; 13							19th	2129	
1990	Alliance Motorsports	59	Olds	DAY; 15	RCH; 29	CAR; 34	MAR; 26	HCY; 4	DAR; 21	BRI; 15	LAN; 10	SBO; 9	NZH; 11	HCY; 4	CLT; 23	DOV; 11	ROU; 19	VOL; 13	MYB; 16	OXF; 33	NHA; 29	SBO; 16	DUB; 8	IRP; 5	ROU; 3	BRI; 18	DAR; 18	RCH; 7	DOV; 23	MAR; 2*	CLT; 24	NHA; 30	CAR; 31	MAR; 29					12th	3504	
1991	Alliance Motorsports	59	Olds	DAY; 20	RCH; 28	CAR; 9	MAR; 25	VOL; 14	HCY; 6	DAR; 25	BRI; 30	**LAN**; 4	SBO; 20	NZH; 10	CLT; 12	DOV; 15	ROU; 1*	HCY; 6*	MYB; 2	GLN; 13	OXF; 40	NHA; 7	SBO; 22	DUB; 3	IRP; 13	ROU; 2	BRI; 7	DAR; 19	RCH; 2	DOV; 2	CLT; 18	NHA; 5	CAR; 7	MAR; 29					3rd	3929	
1992	Alliance Motorsports	59	Olds	DAY; 5	CAR; 18	RCH; 36	ATL; 22	MAR; 4	DAR; 1	BRI; 8	HCY; 13	LAN; 4	DUB; 23	NZH; 8	CLT; 9	DOV; 1*	**ROU**; 1*	MYB; 25	GLN; 17	VOL; 3	NHA; 2	TAL; 36	**IRP**; 2*	ROU; 6	MCH; 30	NHA; 13	BRI; 9	DAR; 22	RCH; 1	DOV; 1*	CLT; 23	MAR; 29	CAR; 27	HCY; 15					5th	3988	
1993	Alliance Motorsports	59	Olds	DAY; 31	CAR; 2	RCH; 5	DAR; 1*	BRI; 10	HCY; 25	ROU; 29	MAR; 22	NZH; 1	CLT; 5	DOV; 7	MYB; 4	GLN; 26	MLW; 22	TAL; 7	IRP; 18	MCH; 2	NHA; 1	BRI; 21	DAR; 28	RCH; 26	DOV; 12	ROU; 20	CLT; 43												8th	3389	
1993	Precision Products Racing	0	Olds																									MAR; 23		HCY; 26									8th	3389	
1993	Precision Products Racing	0	Chevy																										CAR; 9		ATL; 7								8th	3389	
1994	J&J Racing	99	Chevy	DAY; 9	**CAR**; 5	RCH; 13	ATL; 31	MAR; 14	DAR; 15	HCY; 10	BRI; 19	ROU; 13	NHA; 24	NZH; 35	CLT; 6	DOV; 7	MYB; 4	GLN; 6	MLW; 34	SBO; 6	TAL; 29	HCY; 20	IRP; 15	MCH; 28															12th	3043	
1994	Laughlin Racing Products	35	Chevy																						BRI; 26	DAR; 36	RCH; 15	DOV; 40	CLT; 14										12th	3043	
1994	Ferree Racing	46	Chevy																											MAR; 36									12th	3043	
1994	Petty Enterprises	43	Pontiac																												CAR; 10								12th	3043	
1996		7		DAY	CAR	RCH	ATL; DNQ	NSV	DAR	BRI	HCY	NZH	CLT	DOV	SBO	MYB	GLN	MLW	NHA	TAL	IRP	MCH	BRI	DAR	RCH	DOV	CLT	CAR	HOM										NA	-	
1997	Team Amick	35	Pontiac	DAY	CAR	RCH	ATL	LVS	DAR	HCY	TEX	BRI	NSV	TAL	NHA	NZH	CLT; DNQ	DOV																					32nd	1465	
1997	ST Motorsports	47	Chevy																SBO; 31	GLN; 38	MLW; 21	MYB; 32	GTY; 37	IRP; 18	MCH; 35	BRI; 3	DAR; 14	RCH; 15	DOV; 27	CLT; 16	CAL; 5	CAR; 10	HOM; 31						32nd	1465	
1998	ST Motorsports	59	Chevy	DAY; 34	CAR; 17	LVS; 38	NSV; 31*	DAR; 9	BRI; DNQ	TEX; DNQ	**HCY**; 6	TAL; DNQ	NHA; 9	NZH	CLT; 26	DOV; 6	RCH; 10	PPR	GLN	MLW	MYB	**CAL**; 14	SBO	IRP	MCH; 19	BRI; 19	DAR; 9	RCH; 37	DOV	CLT	GTY	CAR; 15	ATL; 31	HOM; 37					31st	1870	
1999	Xpress Motorsports	61	Pontiac	DAY	CAR	LVS	ATL	DAR	TEX	NSV	BRI	TAL	CAL	NHA	RCH	NZH	CLT	DOV	SBO	GLN	MLW	MYB	PPR	GTY	IRP	MCH	BRI	DAR; 18	RCH; 28	DOV; 17	CLT; DNQ	CAR	MEM	PHO	HOM				77th	300	
2004	ST Motorsports	47	Ford	DAY; 17	CAR; 23	LVS; 24	DAR; 22	BRI; 22	TEX; 24	NSH; 11	TAL; 14	CAL; 27	GTY; 36	RCH; 20	NZH; 19	CLT; 20	DOV; 15	NSH; 15	KEN; 16	MLW; 14	DAY; 4	CHI; 35	NHA; 13	PPR; 19	IRP; 22	MCH; 28	BRI; 9	CAL; 25	RCH; 17	DOV; 22	KAN; 20	CLT; 16	MEM; 17	ATL; 13	PHO; 17	DAR; 13	HOM; 24		15th	3604	
2005	ST Motorsports	46	Ford	DAY	CAL	MXC	LVS	ATL	NSH	BRI	TEX	PHO	TAL	DAR; 25	RCH	CLT; DNQ	DOV	NSH	KEN	MLW	DAY	CHI	NHA	PPR	GTY	IRP; 16	GLN	MCH	BRI; 16	CAL	RCH; 33	DOV	KAN	CLT	MEM	TEX; 30	PHO	HOM	71st	455	
2008	JTG Daugherty Racing	59	Ford	DAY	CAL	LVS	ATL	BRI	NSH	TEX	PHO	MXC	TAL	RCH	DAR	CLT	DOV	NSH	KEN	MLW; QL^{†}	NHA	DAY	CHI	GTY	IRP	CGV	GLN	MCH	BRI	CAL	RCH	DOV	KAN	CLT	MEM; QL^{†}	TEX	PHO	HOM	NA	-	
^{†} - Qualified for Marcos Ambrose

==== Craftsman Truck Series ====
NASCAR Craftsman Truck Series results
Year	Team	No.	Make	1	2	3	4	5	6	7	8	9	10	11	12	13	14	15	16	17	18	19	20	21	22	23	24	25	NCTS	Pts	Ref
2002	Bobby Hamilton Racing	18	Dodge	DAY; 1*	DAR; 2	MAR; 14	GTW; 31	PPR; 30	DOV; 2	TEX; 6	MEM; 12	MLW; 7	KAN; 7	KEN; 3	NHA; 9	MCH; 1*	IRP; 5	NSH; 9	RCH; 15	TEX; 7	SBO; 24	LVS; 7	CAL; 7	PHO; 14	HOM; 4				7th	3097	
2003	HT Motorsports	59	Dodge	DAY; 3	DAR; 10	MMR; 11	MAR; 17	CLT; 31	DOV; 10	TEX; 26	MEM	MLW	KAN; 5	KEN; 8	GTW	MCH; 14	IRP; 18	NSH; 15	BRI; 2	RCH; 2	NHA; 14	CAL; 11	LVS; 11	SBO; 10	TEX; 13	MAR; 27	PHO; 8	HOM; 26	12th	2773	
2005	HT Motorsports	59	Dodge	DAY; 15	CAL; 24	ATL; 20	MAR; 25	GTW; 8	MFD; 25	CLT; 22	DOV; 26	TEX; 31	MCH; 17	MLW; 14	KAN; 33	KEN; 17	MEM; 32	IRP; 7	NSH; 25	BRI; 17	RCH; 8	NHA; 14	LVS; 24	MAR; 31	ATL; 27	TEX; 26	PHO; 22	HOM; 24	20th	2493	

==== Charlotte/Daytona Dash Series ====
Charlotte/Daytona Dash Series results
Year	Team	No.	Make	1	2	3	4	5	6	7	8	9	10	11	12	13	14	15	NCDDS	Pts	Ref
1988	Page Racing	54	Pontiac	DAY	ROU	HCY	MYB	CLT	ASH; 14	NSV	SUM	STH	LAN	AND	MYB	LAN	HCY	CLT	N/A	0	
1989	Page Racing	54	Pontiac	DAY	FLO	NRV	HCY	CON	LAN	SBO; 1	NSV	SUM	LAN						37th	180	
1989	Page Racing	75	Pontiac											AND; 1	BGS	MYB	HCY	LAN; 1	37th	180	

=== ARCA Permatex SuperCar Series ===
(key) (Bold – Pole position awarded by qualifying time. Italics – Pole position earned by points standings or practice time. * – Most laps led.)

ARCA Permatex SuperCar Series results
Year	Team	No.	Make	1	2	3	4	5	6	7	8	9	10	11	12	13	14	15	16	17	18	APSC	Pts	Ref
1989	Collins Racing	24	Pontiac	DAY	ATL	KIL	TAL	FRS	POC	KIL	HAG	POC	TAL	DEL	FRS	ISF	TOL	DSF	SLM	ATL; 40		120th	-	
1990	Alliance Training Centers	24	Pontiac	DAY; DNQ	ATL	KIL	TAL	FRS	POC	KIL	TOL	HAG	POC	TAL	MCH	ISF	TOL	DSF	WIN	DEL	ATL	NA	-	
