= 1992 NASCAR Busch Series =

American motorsport season

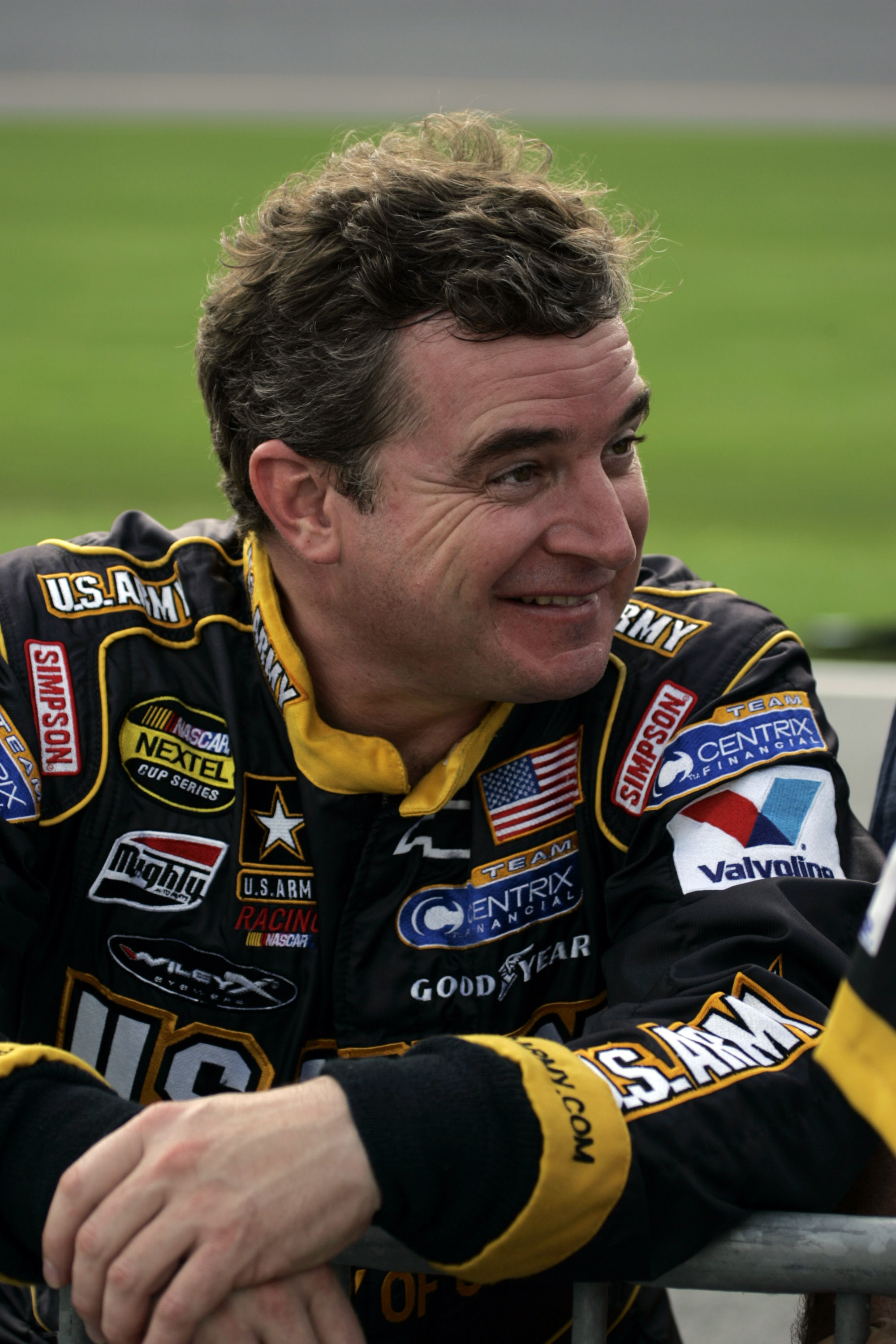
Joe Nemechek, the 1992 Busch Series champion

The 1992 NASCAR Busch Series began February 15, 1992 and ended November 8, 1992. Joe Nemechek of NEMCO Motorsports won the championship.

== Races ==
=== Goody's 300 ===
The Goody's 300 was held February 15 at Daytona International Speedway. Michael Waltrip won the pole.

Top ten results

1. #3 - Dale Earnhardt
2. #4 - Ernie Irvan
3. #27 - Ward Burton
4. #45 - Jimmy Spencer
5. #59 - Robert Pressley
6. #0 - Rick Mast
7. #60 - Mark Martin
8. #17 - Darrell Waltrip
9. #15 - Ken Schrader
10. #31 - Steve Grissom

=== Goodwrench 200 ===
The Goodwrench 200 was held February 29 at North Carolina Speedway. Jeff Gordon won the pole.

Top ten results

1. #27 - Ward Burton*
2. #60 - Mark Martin
3. #28 - Davey Allison
4. #3 - Dale Earnhardt
5. #36 - Kenny Wallace
6. #72 - Tracy Leslie
7. #31 - Steve Grissom
8. #99 - Ricky Craven
9. #1 - Jeff Gordon
10. #19 - Tom Peck
- This was Burton's first career Busch Series victory.

=== Hardee's 200 ===
The Hardee's 200 was held March 7 at Richmond International Raceway. Jeff Gordon won the pole.

Top ten results

1. #7 - Harry Gant
2. #36 - Kenny Wallace
3. #44 - Bobby Labonte
4. #17 - Darrell Waltrip
5. #87 - Joe Nemechek
6. #0 - Rick Mast
7. #25 - Jimmy Hensley
8. #1 - Jeff Gordon
9. #63 - Chuck Bown
10. #91 - Joe Bessey -1

=== Atlanta 300 ===
The inaugural Atlanta 300 was held March 14 at Atlanta Motor Speedway. Jeff Gordon won the pole.

Top ten results

1. #1 - Jeff Gordon*
2. #7 - Harry Gant
3. #92 - Hut Stricklin
4. #28 - Davey Allison
5. #97 - Morgan Shepherd
6. #56 - Dave Mader III
7. #72 - Tracy Leslie
8. #60 - Mark Martin
9. #18 - Dale Jarrett
10. #29 - Phil Parsons
- This was Gordon's first career Busch Series victory.

=== Miller 500 ===
The Miller 500 was held March 22 at Martinsville Speedway. Ricky Craven won the pole.

Top ten results

1. #36 - Kenny Wallace
2. #87 - Joe Nemechek
3. #63 - Chuck Bown
4. #99 - Robert Pressley
5. #72 - Tracy Leslie
6. #1 - Jeff Gordon
7. #75 - Butch Miller
8. #25 - Jimmy Hensley
9. #79 - Dave Rezendes -1
10. #20 - Mike Wallace -1

=== Mark III Vans 200 ===
The Mark III Vans 200 was held March 28 at Darlington Raceway. Mark Martin won the pole.

Top ten results

1. #59 - Robert Pressley
2. #7 - Harry Gant
3. #75 - Butch Miller
4. #2 - Dick Trickle
5. #34 - Todd Bodine -1
6. #31 - Steve Grissom -1
7. #27 - Ward Burton -1
8. #72 - Tracy Leslie -1
9. #92 - Hut Stricklin -1
10. #6 - Tommy Houston -1

=== Budweiser 250 ===
The Budweiser 250 was held April 4 at Bristol Motor Speedway. Butch Miller won the pole.

Top ten results

1. #7 - Harry Gant
2. #28 - Davey Allison
3. #08 - Bobby Dotter
4. #18 - Dale Jarrett
5. #1 - Jeff Gordon
6. #44 - Bobby Labonte
7. #25 - Jimmy Hensley -1
8. #59 - Robert Pressley -1
9. #36 - Kenny Wallace -1
10. #87 - Joe Nemechek -2

=== Mountain Dew 500 ===
The Mountain Dew 500 was held April 18 at Hickory Motor Speedway. Steve Grissom won the pole. A record of 26 cautions occurred during this race.

Top ten results

1. #6 - Tommy Houston
2. #44 - Bobby Labonte
3. #63 - Chuck Bown
4. #87 - Joe Nemechek
5. #17 - Darrell Waltrip
6. #31 - Steve Grissom
7. #27 - Ward Burton
8. #25 - Jimmy Hensley
9. #75 - Butch Miller
10. #48 - Jack Sprague
- This was Houston's last career NASCAR victory.

=== Nestle 300 ===
The Nestle 300 was held April 25 at Lanier Raceway. Jeff Gordon won the pole.

Top ten results

1. #44 - Bobby Labonte
2. #63 - Chuck Bown
3. #36 - Kenny Wallace
4. #59 - Robert Pressley
5. #87 - Joe Nemechek
6. #34 - Todd Bodine -1
7. #8 - Jeff Burton -1
8. #10 - Steve Boley -1
9. #19 - Tom Peck -2
10. #1 - Jeff Gordon -2

=== Granger Select 200 ===
The Granger Select 200 was held May 5 at New River Valley Speedway. Johnny Rumley won the pole.

Top ten results

1. #08 - Bobby Dotter
2. #48 - Jack Sprague
3. #19 - Tom Peck
4. #31 - Steve Grissom
5. #1 - Jeff Gordon
6. #87 - Joe Nemechek
7. #16 - Jeff Green
8. #36 - Kenny Wallace
9. #27 - Ward Burton -1
10. #25 - Johnny Rumley -1
- Jeff Burton was the original winner of this race, but was disqualified due to an illegal part. As a result, Bobby Dotter scored the first and only win of his career.

=== Pontiac 200 ===
The Pontiac 200 was held May 9 at Nazareth Speedway. Kenny Wallace won the pole.

Top ten results

1. #34 - Todd Bodine
2. #44 - Bobby Labonte
3. #60 - Mark Martin
4. #63 - Chuck Bown
5. #25 - Jimmy Hensley
6. #30 - Michael Waltrip
7. #36 - Kenny Wallace
8. #59 - Robert Pressley
9. #72 - Tracy Leslie -2
10. #99 - Ricky Craven -2

=== Champion 300 ===
The Champion 300 was held May 23 at Charlotte Motor Speedway. Jeff Gordon won the pole.

Top ten results

1. #1 - Jeff Gordon
2. #44 - Bobby Labonte
3. #21 - Morgan Shepherd
4. #10 - Sterling Marlin
5. #18 - Dale Jarrett
6. #27 - Ward Burton
7. #34 - Todd Bodine -1
8. #2 - Dick Trickle -1
9. #59 - Robert Pressley -1
10. #29 - Phil Parsons -1

=== Goodwrench 200 ===
The Goodwrench 200 was held June 1 at Dover International Speedway. Todd Bodine won the pole.

Top ten results

1. #59 - Robert Pressley
2. #8 - Jeff Burton
3. #94 - Terry Labonte
4. #11 - Bill Elliott
5. #87 - Joe Nemechek
6. #27 - Ward Burton
7. #75 - Butch Miller
8. #34 - Todd Bodine
9. #9 - Clifford Allison -1
10. #72 - Tracy Leslie -1

=== Roses Stores 300 ===
The Roses Stores 300 was held June 6 at Orange County Speedway. Robert Pressley won the pole.

Top ten results

1. #59 - Robert Pressley
2. #87 - Joe Nemechek
3. #44 - Bobby Labonte
4. #36 - Kenny Wallace
5. #1 - Jeff Gordon
6. #34 - Todd Bodine
7. #19 - Tom Peck -1
8. #75 - Butch Miller -2
9. #25 - Johnny Rumley -3
10. #8 - Jeff Burton -4

=== Carolina Pride/Budweiser 250 ===
The Carolina Pride/Budweiser 250 was held June 20 at Myrtle Beach Speedway. Jeff Gordon won the pole.

Top ten results

1. #20 - Jimmy Spencer
2. #44 - Bobby Labonte
3. #36 - Kenny Wallace
4. #72 - Tracy Leslie
5. #1 - Jeff Gordon
6. #19 - Tom Peck
7. #27 - Ward Burton
8. #6 - Tommy Houston
9. #63 - Chuck Bown
10. #99 - Ricky Craven

=== Fay's 150 ===
The Fay's 150 was held June 27 at Watkins Glen International. Kenny Wallace won the pole.

Top ten results

1. #4 - Ernie Irvan
2. #34 - Todd Bodine
3. #94 - Terry Labonte
4. #87 - Joe Nemechek
5. #79 - Dave Rezendes
6. #36 - Kenny Wallace
7. #63 - Chuck Bown
8. #75 - Butch Miller
9. #8 - Jeff Burton -1
10. #49 - Ed Ferree -1
- This was the first major race run at Watkins Glen International with the new Inner Loop bus stop complex at the end of the backstretch. The Inner Loop was installed after a series of major accidents in the downhill, banked turn 5 (now turn 9) in the previous years (including a wreck in the 1991 Bud at the Glen that claimed the life of longtime Winston Cup competitor J. D. McDuffie, which, coincidentally, Irvan won).

=== Firecracker 200 ===
The Firecracker 200 was held July 4 at Volusia County Speedway. Jeff Gordon won the pole.

Top ten results

1. #31 - Steve Grissom
2. #20 - Jimmy Spencer
3. #59 - Robert Pressley
4. #87 - Joe Nemechek
5. #34 - Todd Bodine
6. #19 - Tom Peck
7. #72 - Tracy Leslie
8. #63 - Chuck Bown
9. #3 - David Bonnett
10. #44 - Bobby Labonte

=== Budweiser 300 ===
The Budweiser 300 was held July 12 at New Hampshire International Speedway. Kenny Wallace won the pole.

Top ten results

1. #8 - Jeff Burton
2. #59 - Robert Pressley
3. #44 - Bobby Labonte
4. #19 - Tom Peck
5. #7 - Curtis Markham
6. #34 - Todd Bodine -1
7. #25 - Jimmy Hensley -1
8. #74 - Mike Stefanik -1
9. #87 - Joe Nemechek -1
10. #6 - Tommy Houston -1

=== Fram Filter 500K ===
The inaugural Fram Filter 500K was held July 25 at Talladega Superspeedway. Dale Earnhardt won the pole.

Top ten results

1. #4 - Ernie Irvan
2. #30 - Michael Waltrip
3. #34 - Todd Bodine
4. #3 - Dale Earnhardt
5. #92 - Hut Stricklin
6. #72 - Tracy Leslie
7. #51 - Jeff Purvis
8. #15 - Ken Schrader
9. #6 - Tommy Houston
10. #44 - Bobby Labonte

=== Kroger 200 ===
The Kroger 200 was held August 1 at Indianapolis Raceway Park. Robert Pressley won the pole.

Top ten results

1. #87 - Joe Nemechek*
2. #59 - Robert Pressley
3. #6 - Tommy Houston
4. #75 - Butch Miller
5. #4 - Ernie Irvan
6. #21 - Morgan Shepherd -1
7. #20 - Jimmy Spencer -1
8. #34 - Todd Bodine -1
9. #08 - Bobby Dotter -1
10. #49 - Ed Ferree -2
- This was Nemechek's first career Busch Series victory.

=== Texas Pete 300 ===
The Texas Pete 300 was held August 8 at Orange County Speedway. Joe Nemechek won the pole.

Top ten results

1. #20 - Jimmy Spencer
2. #87 - Joe Nemechek
3. #98 - Jim Bown
4. #34 - Todd Bodine -1
5. #8 - Jeff Burton -1
6. #59 - Robert Pressley -1
7. #99 - Ricky Craven -2
8. #27 - Ward Burton -2
9. #1 - Jeff Gordon -3
10. #44 - Bobby Labonte -3

=== Detroit Gasket 200 ===
The inaugural Detroit Gasket 200 was held August 15 at Michigan International Speedway. Jeff Gordon won the pole.

Top ten results

1. #34 - Todd Bodine
2. #92 - Hut Stricklin
3. #3 - Dale Earnhardt
4. #11 - Bill Elliott
5. #7 - Harry Gant
6. #18 - Dale Jarrett
7. #29 - Phil Parsons
8. #30 - Michael Waltrip
9. #15 - Ken Schrader
10. #87 - Joe Nemechek
- During Thursday practice, Clifford Allison was killed in an accident while practicing for this race.

=== NE Chevy 250 ===
The NE Chevy 250 was held August 23 at New Hampshire International Speedway. Ernie Irvan won the pole.

Top ten results

1. #87 - Joe Nemechek
2. #3 - Dale Earnhardt
3. #34 - Todd Bodine
4. #1 - Jeff Gordon
5. #15 - Ken Schrader
6. #44 - Bobby Labonte
7. #6 - Tommy Houston
8. #8 - Jeff Burton
9. #99 - Ricky Craven
10. #20 - Jimmy Spencer

=== Food City 250 ===
The Food City 250 was held August 28 at Bristol Motor Speedway. Kenny Wallace won the pole.

Top ten results

1. #34 - Todd Bodine
2. #63 - Chuck Bown
3. #8 - Jeff Burton
4. #90 - Lonnie Rush Jr. -1
5. #27 - Ward Burton -2
6. #77 - Rick Wilson -2
7. #36 - Kenny Wallace -4
8. #5 - Richard Lasater -4
9. #59 - Robert Pressley -6
10. #75 - Butch Miller -23

=== Gatorade 200 ===
The Gatorade 200 was held September 5 at Darlington Raceway. Mark Martin won the pole.

Top ten results

1. #30 - Michael Waltrip
2. #18 - Dale Jarrett
3. #1 - Jeff Gordon
4. #3 - Dale Earnhardt
5. #22 - Ed Berrier
6. #60 - Mark Martin
7. #21 - Morgan Shepherd
8. #72 - Tracy Leslie -1
9. #29 - Phil Parsons -1
10. #34 - Todd Bodine -1

=== Autolite 200 ===
The Autolite 200 was held September 11 at Richmond International Raceway. Todd Bodine won the pole.

Top ten results

1. #59 - Robert Pressley
2. #17 - Darrell Waltrip
3. #60 - Mark Martin
4. #44 - Bobby Labonte
5. #87 - Joe Nemechek
6. #8 - Jeff Burton
7. #34 - Todd Bodine
8. #20 - Jimmy Spencer
9. #7 - Harry Gant
10. #36 - Kenny Wallace

=== SplitFire 200 ===
The SplitFire 200 was held September 19 at Dover International Speedway. Jeff Gordon won the pole.

Top ten results

1. #59 - Robert Pressley
2. #44 - Bobby Labonte
3. #7 - Harry Gant
4. #20 - Jimmy Spencer
5. #36 - Kenny Wallace
6. #92 - Hut Stricklin -1
7. #11 - Bill Elliott -1
8. #30 - Michael Waltrip -1
9. #9 - Mike Wallace -1
10. #63 - Chuck Bown -1

=== All Pro 300 ===
The All Pro 300 was held October 10 at Charlotte Motor Speedway. Jeff Gordon won the pole.

Top ten results

1. #1 - Jeff Gordon
2. #30 - Michael Waltrip
3. #44 - Bobby Labonte
4. #14 - Terry Labonte
5. #15 - Ken Schrader
6. #20 - Jimmy Spencer
7. #7 - Harry Gant
8. #79 - Dave Rezendes
9. #6 - Tommy Houston
10. #29 - Phil Parsons -1

=== Winston Classic ===
The Winston Classic* was held October 18 at Martinsville Speedway. Butch Miller won the pole.

Top ten results

1. #44 - Bobby Labonte
2. #9 - Mike Wallace
3. #75 - Butch Miller
4. #20 - Jimmy Spencer
5. #87 - Joe Nemechek
6. #8 - Jeff Burton
7. #60 - Mark Martin
8. #0 - Rick Mast
9. #08 - Bobby Dotter
10. #6 - Tommy Houston -1
- Both Busch races at Martinsville were held as part of doubleheader with a 200–lap Late Model Stock Car feature.

=== AC-Delco 200 ===
The AC-Delco 200 was held October 24 at North Carolina Speedway. Jeff Gordon won the pole.

Top ten results

1. #60 - Mark Martin
2. #1 - Jeff Gordon
3. #34 - Todd Bodine
4. #17 - Darrell Waltrip
5. #7 - Harry Gant
6. #63 - Chuck Bown
7. #36 - Kenny Wallace
8. #44 - Bobby Labonte
9. #15 - Ken Schrader -1
10. #79 - Dave Rezendes -1
- Following this race, Joe Nemechek led the points standings by 33 points over Bobby Labonte and 78 points over Todd Bodine with just the season finale at Hickory left to run.

=== The Pantry 300 ===
The Pantry 300 was held November 8 at Hickory Motor Speedway. Jim Bown won the pole.

Top ten results

1. #44 - Bobby Labonte
2. #75 - Butch Miller
3. #34 - Todd Bodine
4. #98 - Jim Bown
5. #60 - Mark Martin
6. #87 - Joe Nemechek
7. #63 - Chuck Bown
8. #36 - Kenny Wallace -1
9. #31 - Steve Grissom -1
10. #6 - Tommy Houston -1
- Labonte won the race while leading the most laps, but Nemechek's 6th place finish was enough to win the championship by 3 points over Labonte.

== Full Drivers' Championship ==
(key) Bold – Pole position awarded by time. Italics – Pole position set by owner's points. * – Most laps led.

Pos	Driver	DAY	CAR	RCH	ATL	MAR	DAR	BRI	HCY	LAN	DUB	NAZ	CLT	DOV	ROU	MYB	GLN	VOL	NHA	TAL	IRP	ROU	MCH	NHA	BRI	DAR	RCH	DOV	CLT	MAR	CAR	HCY	Pts
1	Joe Nemechek	31	12	5	21	2	13	10	4	5	6	11	22	5	2	19	4	4	9	13	1	**2**	10	1	15	26	5	15	11	5	16	6	4275
2	Bobby Labonte	30	22	3	25	26	12	6	2	1	20	2	2	25	3	2	12	10	3	10	23	10	23	6	12	16	4	2	3	1	8	1*	4272
3	Todd Bodine	24	23	12	20	25	5	20	27	6	11	1	7	**8**	6	15	2	5	6	3	8	4	1	3	1	10	**7**	13	37	21	3	3	4212
4	Jeff Gordon	23	**9**	**8**	**1***	6	26	5	28	**10***	5	26	**1**	18	5	**5***	19	**18***	29	11	14	9	**19**	4	19*	3	17	**12**	**1***	14	**2**	11	4053
5	Robert Pressley	5	18	36	22	4	1	8	13	4	23	8	9	1*	**1***	25	17	3	2	36	**2***	6	30	13	9	22	1	1*	23	29	27	15	3988
6	Kenny Wallace	16	5	2	12	1*	11	9	24	3	8	7	25	11	4	3	6	23	**23**	26	12	21	32	18	**7**	18	10	5	18	22	7	8	3966
7	Butch Miller	22	15	30	15	7	3	**23**	9	16	21	12	17	7	8	16	8	16	19	25	4	18	24	11	10	23	25	22	13	**3**	19	2	3725
8	Ward Burton	3	1	27	37	19	7	18	7	21	9	17	6	6	12	7	15	19	22	30	13	8	28	39	5	11	11	21	16	16	18	21	3648
9	Jeff Burton	20	19	31	26	23	15	14	14	7	26	27	14	2	10	22	9	22	1	20	11	5	34	8	3	17	6	18	34	6	23	18	3609
10	Tommy Houston	26	26	35	19	14	10	29	1	14	25	14	19	13	13	8	18	14	10	9	3	28	16	7	20	24	24	11	9	10	21	10	3599
11	Chuck Bown	32	35	9	41	3	27	12	3	2	18	4	38	23	19	9	7	8	24	12	24	27	15	22	2	28	14	10	12	24	6	7	3580
12	Steve Grissom	10	7	13	17	21	6	21	**6***	15	4	22	29	12	20	11	11	1	43	16	21	13	18	25	11	19	31	14	33	11	28	9	3545
13	Tom Peck	33	10	23	35	12	20	11	22	9	3	28	24	15	7	6	25	6	4	24	19	12	17	21	18	15	21	17	21	12	20	16	3512
14	Ricky Craven **(R)**	13	8	15	30	**15**	19	22	18	11	24	10	16	14	23	10	24	12	12	21	18	7	13	9	21	25	18	19	15	20	25	29	3456
15	Tracy Leslie	40	6	24	7	5	8	19	17	23	17	9	39	10	11	4	21	7	27	6	22	15	22	28	17	8	23	28	17	28	33	17	3422
16	Bobby Dotter	DNQ	33	21	29	11	18	3	19	12	1	15	32	24	15	20	16	13	15	34	9	11		41	16	33	28	16	DNQ	9	29	23	2961
17	Jimmy Spencer	4		18	33			27	11				40	21	14	1	22	2	38*	32	7	1*	25	10	13	12	8	4	6	4	32	24	2941
18	Richard Lasater	DNQ	27	22	39	20	29	16	26	20	15	25	20	19	21	17	26			28	28	14	20		8	32	32	27	25	19	22	14	2571
19	Harry Gant	DNQ		1*	2		2	1					DNQ	17						33			5		22	31	9	3	7	26	5		1887
20	Jim Bown	42	13	14	32	28	33		20	26	22		31							15		3				20	12		35	23	14	**4**	1793
21	Mark Martin	7	2		8		**32**					3	33*	Wth			30			27						**6**	3		31	7	1*	5	1775
22	Mike Wallace	28	21	34	14	10	22	17	15	19	13	34	21															9	40	2*	34	13	1749
23	Dale Earnhardt	1*	4*		31		17		12				28	16						**4**			3	2		4			41		12		1665
24	Jack Sprague	19	34	11	13	22	25		10	22	2	21	37		28	13				29		26							32				1590
25	Hut Stricklin	21			3		9						DNQ						26	5	15		2		25	13	30	6	26		11		1581
26	Michael Waltrip	**25**		17	28							6	23							2*	26		8			1		8	2				1412
27	Clifford Allison	29	17	16	40	17	24	15		24		13	26	9			20		37	17			Wth										1372
28	Dale Jarrett	44			9		14	4					5										6		27	2	16		36			12	1304
29	Ken Schrader	9			18			24	QL			20	12							8			9	5					5		9		1296
30	Jeff Green	18	31		24			26	30	17	7		QL		26	18		15			20		21		29				DNQ				1277
31	Ernie Irvan	2			36				29			36	41				1*			1	5		31	**33***			29		39		31		1237
32	Dave Rezendes	38		19		9							11				5		42				14	19					8	15	10		1236
33	Troy Beebe	15	32	28	42	24	30						DNQ				32	21			16	16			23	30	22	25	DNQ				1214
34	Bill Elliott	11	30		11								13	4			23			31			4			34		7			36		1203
35	Rick Mast	6		6	16		16	13					36													14	15		38	8	40		1182
36	Darrell Waltrip	8		4	38				5				34							18			26				2		27		4		1173
37	Morgan Shepherd	43			5		28						3						28		6		33	43	14	7		Wth	29				1103
38	Shawna Robinson **(R)**	34	16		43								30		27			11			27		11	24		27	19		30		41	DNQ	1099
39	Jimmy Hensley	27	14	7		8		7	8			5							7														1080
40	Ed Ferree	DNQ	20			27			23				15	20	25		10		39		10			35									960
41	Ed Berrier	17			27		21						27							14					24	5		31	DNQ		17		925
42	Joe Bessey	35	11	10	23							24		26					25					17					DNQ		15		922
43	Tommy Ellis	DNQ		20		13								22		29			33					30			35	23		30		28	841
44	Davey Allison	12	3	25	4		34	2											32									Wth					838
45	Phil Parsons				10		31						10				27						7			9			10				838
46	Terry Labonte	DNQ												3			3							37					4		13		666
47	Mike Porter	DNQ				29		28		27	12					21		17															576
48	Lonnie Rush Jr.										14												29		4		13		DNQ			30	554
49	Mike McLaughlin											30					13		30					29					14			27	549
50	Jeff Barry	14	28	26								33							14					31									540
51	Jeff Purvis																			7			12			21	20						476
52	Steve Boley					18			21	8	19																						457
53	Hermie Sadler																					25					26	20			37	20	431
54	Jason Keller									28						27			13					32					DNQ		39		398
55	Mark Whitaker		36												29	23						20								32			395
56	Dick Trickle						4	25					8	Wth																			390
57	Jamie Aube			33								23							18					16									382
58	Tommy Sigmon										16																			13		25	327
59	David Donohue											16					31										DNQ	24			38		325
60	John Linville														17	12												30					312
61	Nathan Buttke																					23								17		19	312
62	Robert Huffman **(R)**	37			34															35									42			22	305
63	Tim Fedewa						36						35										27						19				301
64	Jay Fogleman								16						24							24											297
65	Jerry Glanville									DNQ					22	28		20															279
66	Johnny Rumley										**10***				9																		272
67	Mike Stefanik																		8					15					DNQ				260
68	Glenn Sullivan		29	29								19																					258
69	Curtis Markham																		5					20									258
70	Michael Ritch																										33			18	30		246
71	Dick McCabe											35							35					12									243
72	Red Farmer												DNQ							22	17												209
73	Sterling Marlin	39											4																				206
74	Bobby Hillin Jr.																		20										22				200
75	Stub Fadden																		16					27									197
76	David Bonnett																	9													35		196
77	Robert Powell												DNQ			24													20				194
78	Doug Didero																					17					27						194
79	Stanley Smith																			19								26					191
80	Billy Clark											29							17														188
81	Elton Sawyer					16											33																179
82	Bobby Dragon																		11					38									179
83	Tony Hirschman			32								32							41														174
84	Martin Truex Sr.											18							34														170
85	Mike Oliver	DNQ								25															28								167
86	Kelly Moore																		44					14									152
87	Dave Mader III				6								DNQ																				150
88	Rick Wilson																								6								150
89	Dale Shaw																		25					34									149
90	Randy MacDonald **(R)**	41					23																										134
91	Brad Sorenson									13																							124
92	Tom Bolles																		45					23									122
93	Eddie Goodson															14																	121
94	Patty Moise																14																121
95	Mack McClellan														16																		115
96	Mike Rowe																		31					40									113
97	Sammy Pegram									18																							109
98	Cecil Eunice												18																				109
99	George Crenshaw														18																		109
100	Mike Hovis																					19					DNQ						106
101	Clay Brown																					22											97
102	David Rogers																			23									DNQ				94
103	Scott Herberg	36											42																				92
104	Barry Bostick		24																														91
105	Billy Standridge																												24				91
106	Andy Hillenburg																														24		91
107	Rich Burgess	DNQ	25										DNQ																				88
108	Jim Keeker																													25			88
109	Scott Kilby								25																								88
110	Bobby Hamilton																				25												88
111	Hal Goodson															26																	85
112	Dennis Setzer																															26	85
113	Ron Lamell																							26									85
114	Jeff Fuller																														26		85
115	Stanton Barrett																								26								85
116	Bill Gratton																													27			82
117	Mike Urciuoli													27																			82
118	Brett Bodine																28																79
119	Mike Skinner																												28				79
120	Chad Little																29																76
121	Larry Carroll																											29					76
122	Andy Belmont																									29							76
123	Babe Branscombe																		40					44									74
124	Jeff Spraker											31																					70
125	Robbie Stanley																													31			70
126	Glenn Allen Jr.																										34						61
127	Greg Trammell **(R)**						35																										58
128	Mike Barry																		36														55
129	Dave Dion																							36									55
130	Bobby Gada																							42									37
131	Mike Weeden																		46														25
132	Mike Garvey	DNQ																															
133	Doug Heveron																												DNQ				
134	Jerry McCart																												DNQ				
135	Tim Steele																												DNQ				
136	Lee Tissot																												DNQ				
137	Kenny Gragg																															DNQ	
138	Casey Elliott																										Wth						
Pos	Driver	DAY	CAR	RCH	ATL	MAR	DAR	BRI	HCY	LAN	DUB	NAZ	CLT	DOV	ROU	MYB	GLN	VOL	NHA	TAL	IRP	ROU	MCH	NHA	BRI	DAR	RCH	DOV	CLT	MAR	CAR	HCY	Pts

== Rookie of the Year ==
Ricky Craven, who had won twice last year as a Busch North competitor in combination races (a common NASCAR regional racing practice; Busch Series and Busch North Series in the Northeastern United States were combined as combination races), finished fourteenth in points and won Rookie of the Year after being the only competitor to attempt the full schedule. Shawna Robinson was the next contender, finishing 38th in the final standings. Robert Huffman, Randy MacDonald, and Greg Trammell also declared for the award, but did not exceed the five race minimum needed to remain eligible.

Craven was officially a rookie even though he raced in seven races in 1991, two more than the allowable limit of five races. NASCAR, however, declared he had only raced in two races (the two Martinsville races), and the other five races were entered as a Busch North Series driver, as his car carried a Busch North Series sticker.

== See also ==
- 1992 NASCAR Winston Cup Series
- 1992 NASCAR Winston West Series
