= Johnny Rumley =

American racing driver

- Born: April 14, 1957 (age 69); Summerfield, North Carolina

NASCAR O'Reilly Auto Parts Series career
- 51 races run over 9 years
- Best finish: 28th (1995)
- First race: 1992 Granger Select 200 (Dublin)
- Last race: 2000 MBNA.com 200 (Dover)
- First win: 1993 The Pantry 300 (Hickory)
- Last win: 1995 MBNA 200 (Dover)
Wins	Top tens	Poles
2	8	1

Johnny Rumley (born April 14, 1957) is an American former stock car racing driver. He won twice in the Busch Series, but has not been seen in the major leagues of NASCAR since 2000.

Rumley made his debut at New River Valley Speedway in 1992. Rumley went out in his No. 25 Beverly Racing Olds and won the pole, and finished tenth in the race. Then, at the very next race at Orange County, Rumley managed a ninth-place finish.

Rumley made five races in 1993, and only had one top-ten finish. Rumley scored what was considering an upset victory at Hickory, pulling his No. 00 Big Dog Coal Oldsmobile into victory lane in just his seventh start. In addition, Rumley had two other top-twenties in the season.

Rumley returned in 1994, running thirteen races. He only earned two top-tens, back-to-back finishes of eighth in his first two-season starts. However, in the next eleven races, driving the No. 41 White House Ford, Rumley could only manage a best finish of eighteenth and a best start of ninth. Yet, Rumley still recorded his highest points position in his career with a 33rd.

Rumley had three top-tens in his seventeen starts in 1995. Rumley picked up his second win at Dover International Speedway, leading eleven laps en route to victory. In addition to his win, Rumley had a sixth at Dover, seventh at New Hampshire and three other top-dozen finishes. Overall, it resulted in a 28th-place finish in points.

However, despite his quick success, Rumley still could not attract a full-time ride and following his part-time run in 1995 driving the No. 25 Big Johnson Chevrolet alternating with Kirk Shelmerdine, Rumley's career began to fade. In six starts in 1996, Rumley's best finish was a 16th at Daytona and a seventeenth at Darlington. It was the first time in his career that Rumley did not record a top-ten in a season.

Rumley returned for two more races in 1997, driving the No. 27 RGM Chevy at Nashville and a 30th at South Boston. Yet, he was 42nd and 30th in those races respectively, and he did not finish either race.

Rumley disappeared seemingly after his run at South Boston. Yet, he came back in 2000, to drive six races for the fledgling Alumni Motorsports. However, he could only manage a best finish of 29th at Dover and Nazareth, as well having struggles in qualifying. Without that success, Rumley currently drives in the USAR Hooters Pro Cup North series, driving for Dale Earnhardt Jr.'s JR Motorsports.

== Motorsports career results ==
=== NASCAR ===
(key) (Bold – Pole position awarded by qualifying time. Italics – Pole position earned by points standings or practice time. * – Most laps led.)

==== Busch Series ====
NASCAR Busch Series results
Year	Team	No.	Make	1	2	3	4	5	6	7	8	9	10	11	12	13	14	15	16	17	18	19	20	21	22	23	24	25	26	27	28	29	30	31	32	NBSC	Pts	Ref
1992	Beverley Racing	25	Olds	DAY	CAR	RCH	ATL	MAR	DAR	BRI	HCY	LAN	**DUB**; 10*	NZH	CLT	DOV	ROU; 9	MYB	GLN	VOL	NHA	TAL	IRP	ROU	MCH	NHA	BRI	DAR	RCH	DOV	CLT	MAR	CAR	HCY		66th	272	
1993	Johnny Rumley	00	Olds	DAY	CAR	RCH	DAR	BRI	HCY	ROU; 19	MAR	NZH	CLT	DOV	MYB; 31	GLN	MLW	TAL	IRP	MCH	NHA	BRI; 15	DAR	RCH	DOV	ROU	CLT	MAR; 26	CAR	HCY; 1	ATL					48th	559	
1994	Johnny Rumley	00	Chevy	DAY	CAR	RCH	ATL	MAR; 8	DAR	HCY; 8	BRI	ROU															RCH; DNQ	DOV	CLT	MAR; 25	CAR					33rd	1276	
1994	Tom Milner	41	Ford										NHA; 18	NZH	CLT; DNQ	DOV; 23	MYB; 20	GLN; 31	MLW; 26		TAL; 27	HCY; 28	IRP; 23	MCH	BRI; 22	DAR										33rd	1276	
1994	Tom Milner	41	Chevy																	SBO; 24																33rd	1276	
1995	Beverley Racing	25	Chevy	DAY	CAR	RCH	ATL	NSV	DAR	BRI	HCY; 12	NHA; 7	NZH; 34	CLT; 24	DOV; 6	MYB; 30	GLN; DNQ	MLW; 24	TAL; 11	SBO; 28	IRP; 27	MCH; 29	BRI; 35	DAR; 23	RCH; DNQ	DOV; 1	CLT; 12	CAR; 21	HOM; 40							28th	1708	
1996	Beverley Racing	25	Chevy	DAY; 16	CAR; 26	RCH; 30	ATL; 24	NSV; 36	DAR; 17	BRI; DNQ	HCY; DNQ	NZH	CLT	DOV	SBO	MYB	GLN	MLW	NHA	TAL	IRP	MCH	BRI	DAR	RCH	DOV										52nd	531	
1996	Henderson Motorsports	75	Ford																								CLT; DNQ	CAR; DNQ	HOM							52nd	531	
1997	Carolyn Laugeni	27	Ford	DAY	CAR	RCH	ATL	LVS	DAR	HCY; DNQ	TEX	BRI																								87th	110	
1997	Carolyn Laugeni	27	Chevy										NSV; 42	TAL	NHA	NZH	CLT	DOV	SBO; 30	GLN	MLW	MYB	GTY	IRP	MCH	BRI	DAR	RCH	DOV	CLT	CAL	CAR	HOM			87th	110	
1998	Curb Agajanian Performance Group	96	Pontiac	DAY	CAR	LVS	NSV	DAR	BRI	TEX	HCY; DNQ	TAL	NHA	NZH	CLT	DOV	RCH	PPR	GLN	MLW	MYB	CAL	SBO	IRP	MCH	BRI	DAR	RCH	DOV	CLT	GTY	CAR	ATL	HOM		NA	-	
2000	Alumni Motorsports	0	Chevy	DAY	CAR	LVS	ATL	DAR	BRI	TEX	NSV; 35	TAL; DNQ	CAL	RCH	NHA	CLT	DOV	SBO	MYB	GLN	MLW	NZH; 29	PPR; 33	GTY; DNQ	IRP; 37	MCH	BRI; 42	DAR	RCH	DOV; 29	CLT; DNQ	CAR	MEM	PHO	HOM	68th	363	
