= Casey Elliott =

American stock car racing driver

- Elliott with his 1993 All Pro Series car
- Born: February 13, 1974; Dawsonville, Georgia, U.S.
- Died: January 14, 1996 (aged 21); Dawsonville, Georgia, U.S.
- Cause of death: Synovial sarcoma (soft tissue cancer)

NASCAR O'Reilly Auto Parts Series career
- 2 races run over 1 year
- Best finish: 81st (1993)
- First race: 1993 Detroit Gasket 200 (Michigan)
- Last race: 1993 All Pro 300 (Charlotte)
| Wins | Top tens | Poles |
|---|---|---|
| 0 | 0 | 0 |

William Casey Elliott (February 13, 1974 – January 14, 1996) was an American stock car racing driver. The nephew of 1988 NASCAR Winston Cup champion Bill Elliott and the cousin of 2020 Cup Series champion Chase Elliott. He raced in the NASCAR Slim Jim All Pro Series and NASCAR Busch Series before being diagnosed with cancer; he turned to the motorsports ministry and crew chiefing before his death from the disease at age 21.

== Career ==
The son of NASCAR engine builder Ernie Elliott and nephew of 1988 Winston Cup Series champion Bill Elliott, Casey Elliott grew up among racers and racing, and, taking up the sport as a career in his teens, quickly proved adept at competition, racing at Lanier Raceway and other tracks in Georgia. By 1993, at age eighteen, he was ready to move up to top level NASCAR competition; in addition to running full-time in the Slim Jim All Pro Series, he formed Casey Elliott Sports with his parents and sisters to compete in the Xfinity Series with Eagle Snacks sponsorship, and the team ran two races that year. He qualified in the top ten for both events, finishing 20th in his debut at Michigan International Speedway; in October at Charlotte Motor Speedway he started fourth, outqualifying his more famous uncle, but finished 44th following an accident.

== Cancer and death ==
Elliott planned to compete full-time in the Busch Series (later Xfinity) starting in 1994; however, in December 1993, a medical examination revealed that a growth on his upper right thigh was cancerous. He had surgery to remove it in February 1994; although it was believed that the cancer had been confined to the removed tumor, and Elliott initially showed improvement, the cancer had already metastasized; not long afterwards Elliott required knee replacement surgery, ending his racing career. Elliott stated his intention to take up a career as a minister with Motor Racing Outreach.

Over the next two years, Elliott underwent treatment, however in late 1995 his condition deteriorated; in January 1996, he died of the disease. Jerry Glanville, coach of the Atlanta Falcons and a part-time NASCAR competitor whom Elliott had been scheduled to crew chief for during the 1996 season, described Elliott as "a super, super kid"; Lanier National Speedway established the annual Casey Elliott Memorial Race in his honor.

== Legacy ==
Chase Elliott, Casey Elliott's cousin, ran a tribute paint scheme on his NASCAR Monster Energy Cup Series car at Darlington Raceway in the 2018 Bojangles' Southern 500, designed to resemble the one driven by Casey.

== Motorsports career results ==
=== NASCAR ===
(key) (Bold – Pole position awarded by qualifying time. Italics – Pole position earned by points standings or practice time. * – Most laps led.)

==== Busch Series ====
NASCAR Busch Series results
| Year | Team | No. | Make | 1 | 2 | 3 | 4 | 5 | 6 | 7 | 8 | 9 | 10 | 11 | 12 | 13 | 14 | 15 | 16 | 17 | 18 | 19 | 20 | 21 | 22 | 23 | 24 | 25 | 26 | 27 | 28 | NBGNC | Pts | Ref |
|---|---|---|---|---|---|---|---|---|---|---|---|---|---|---|---|---|---|---|---|---|---|---|---|---|---|---|---|---|---|---|---|---|---|---|
| 1993 | Bill Elliott Racing | 94 | Ford | DAY | CAR | RCH | DAR | BRI | HCY | ROU | MAR | NZH | CLT | DOV | MYB | GLN | MLW | TAL | IRP | MCH; 20 | NHA | BRI | DAR | RCH; DNQ | DOV | ROU | CLT; 44 | MAR | CAR | HCY | ATL | 81st | 134 | |

=== ARCA Hooters SuperCar Series ===
(key) (Bold – Pole position awarded by qualifying time. Italics – Pole position earned by points standings or practice time. * – Most laps led.)

ARCA Hooters SuperCar Series results
| Year | Team | No. | Make | 1 | 2 | 3 | 4 | 5 | 6 | 7 | 8 | 9 | 10 | 11 | 12 | 13 | 14 | 15 | 16 | 17 | 18 | 19 | ARSC | Pts | Ref |
|---|---|---|---|---|---|---|---|---|---|---|---|---|---|---|---|---|---|---|---|---|---|---|---|---|---|
| 1993 | Bill Elliott Racing | 94 | Ford | DAY | FIF | TWS | TAL | KIL | CMS | FRS | TOL | POC | MCH | FRS | POC; 7 | KIL | ISF | DSF | TOL | SLM | WIN | ATL | 110th | 0 | |
