= Greg Trammell =

American racing driver

- Born: July 7, 1966 (age 60); Dawsonville, Georgia, U.S.

NASCAR O'Reilly Auto Parts Series career
- 1 race run over 1 year
- Best finish: 127th (1992)
- First race: 1992 Mark III Vans 200 (Darlington)
Wins	Top tens	Poles
0	0	0

ARCA Menards Series career
- 9 races run over 3 years
- Best finish: N/A (points not recorded past 20th) (1989), (1990), (1991)
- First race: 1989 96 Rock 500k (Atlanta)
- Last race: 1991 Atlanta ARCA 500k (Atlanta)
- First win: 1991 Atlanta ARCA 500k (Atlanta)
Wins	Top tens	Poles
1	8	1
- Statistics up to date as of December 4, 2024.

Greg Trammell (born July 7, 1966) is an American former professional stock car racing driver who has competed in the NASCAR Busch Series and the ARCA Permatex SuperCar Series.

Trammell has also previously competed in the NASCAR Southeast Series.

== Motorsports results ==
=== NASCAR ===
(key) (Bold - Pole position awarded by qualifying time. Italics - Pole position earned by points standings or practice time. * – Most laps led.)

==== Busch Series ====
NASCAR Busch Series results
Year	Team	No.	Make	1	2	3	4	5	6	7	8	9	10	11	12	13	14	15	16	17	18	19	20	21	22	23	24	25	26	27	28	29	30	31	NBSC	Pts	Ref
1992	Charles Hardy	11	Ford	DAY	CAR	RCH	ATL	MAR	DAR; 35	BRI	HCY	LAN	DUB	NZH	CLT	DOV	ROU	MYB	GLN	VOL	NHA	TAL	IRP	ROU	MCH	NHA	BRI	DAR	RCH	DOV	CLT	MAR	CAR	HCY	127th	58	

=== ARCA Permatex SuperCar Series ===
(key) (Bold – Pole position awarded by qualifying time. Italics – Pole position earned by points standings or practice time. * – Most laps led.)

ARCA Permatex SuperCar Series results
Year	Team	No.	Make	1	2	3	4	5	6	7	8	9	10	11	12	13	14	15	16	17	18	19	20	APSSC	Pts	Ref
1989	Melling Racing	91	Ford	DAY	ATL; 4	KIL	TAL	FRS	POC; 4	KIL	HAG	POC; 2	TAL	DEL	FRS	ISF	TOL	DSF	SLM	ATL; 23				N/A	0	
1990	Melling Racing	91	Ford	DAY; DNQ	ATL	KIL	TAL	FRS																N/A	0	
1990	Melling Racing	18	Ford						POC; 3	KIL	TOL	HAG	POC; 3	TAL	MCH; 8	ISF	TOL	DSF	WIN	DEL	ATL; 8			N/A	0	
1991	Melling Racing	18	Ford	DAY	**ATL**; 1	KIL	TAL	TOL	FRS	POC	MCH	KIL	FRS	DEL	POC	TAL	HPT	MCH	ISF	TOL	DSF	TWS	ATL	N/A	0	
