= Roy Payne (footballer) =

Australian rules footballer, born 1909

Personal information
- Full name: Walter Roy Payne
- Born: 7 October 1909; Macarthur, Victoria
- Died: 22 August 1969 (aged 59); Hamilton, Victoria
- Height: 188 cm (6 ft 2 in)
- Weight: 84 kg (185 lb)

Playing career^{1}
Years	Club	Games (Goals)
1929, 1931	Essendon	19 (15)
- ^{1} Playing statistics correct to the end of 1931.

Walter Roy Payne (7 October 1909 – 22 August 1969) was an Australian rules footballer who played with Essendon in the Victorian Football League (VFL).
