= Tracy Leslie =

American racing driver (born 1957)

- Born: October 24, 1957 (age 69); Mount Clemens, Michigan, U.S.
- Achievements: 1988 ARCA Racing Series Champion
- Awards: 1989 ARCA Racing Series Bill France Four Crown

NASCAR Cup Series career
- 5 races run over 2 years
- Best finish: 56th (1989)
- First race: 1989 Coca-Cola 600 (Charlotte)
- Last race: 1990 AC Delco 500 (Rockingham)
Wins	Top tens	Poles
0	0	0

NASCAR O'Reilly Auto Parts Series career
- 206 races run over 8 years
- Best finish: 11th (1993, 1994)
- First race: 1991 Goody's 300 (Daytona)
- Last race: 1998 MBNA Gold 200 (Dover)
- First win: 1993 Kroger 200 (IRP)
Wins	Top tens	Poles
1	45	2
- Statistics up to date as of April 30, 2020.

Tracy Leslie (born October 24, 1957) is an American former professional stock car racing driver. He last raced in the ARCA Racing Series against his son, Billy. He also raced in the NASCAR Winston Cup Series and NASCAR Busch Series.

== Early career ==
Leslie ran his first race in 1975, and soon began racing throughout the Midwest, winning championships at Mount Clemens Speedway and Toledo Speedway and Delaware Speedway Park. Later he moved down south to compete in the ARCA series, winning the championship and Rookie of the Year honors in 1988. He collected three more wins over the next two years as well. He made his NASCAR debut in 1989 at the Coca-Cola 600, starting 29th and finishing 25th in a car owned by A. J. Foyt. He ran another race that year for Foyt at Michigan, finishing twentieth. In 1990, Leslie ran the 600 in his own No. 72, but suffered engine failure. Later in the year, he teamed with owner Ron Parker to field the No. 72 Detroit Gasket Chevy. He ran two more Cup races in the entry, both resulting in DNF’s.

== 1991-1995 ==
Leslie made his Busch Series debut in 1991 at the Goody’s 300 in the Detroit Gasket Oldsmobile, but was involved in a first lap crash and did not finish the race. He ran the season full-time, posting a second-place finish at Indianapolis Raceway Park, and finished fifteenth in points. The next year, he had ten top-tens and finished fifteenth in points again. In 1993, Leslie won his first pole at the Champion 300, but finished 34th due to engine failure. Later, at IRP, Leslie took his only career win in the Busch Series. He finished eleventh in points at the end of the year. He would finish eleventh in points the next year as well, posting eight top-tens. In 1995, he won his second at pole at Dover, but was released from the No. 72 for the last two races of the year, but Parker fielded a second entry for him.

== 1996-2000 ==
In 1996, Leslie began running a limited schedule in his No. 11. He ran eight races, his best finish a tenth at IRP. He also attempted the Daytona 500 in the Cup Series in a car owned by Phil Barkdoll, but he failed to qualify. In 1997, he signed to drive the No. 63 Lysol Pontiac Grand Prix for Hensley Motorsports. He had five top-tens and finished seventeenth in points. He returned to the ride in 1998, his best finish a thirteenth before he was released. He has not raced in NASCAR since.

In 1999, Leslie returned to the ARCA series driving a car owned by Jack Bowsher, and picked up wins at Winchester Speedway and Salem Speedway. He moved to a part-time schedule in 2000, running eight of twenty races, and picked up his last win at Salem. Leslie qualified for five races in 2001, with a best finish of sixth at Pocono. Leslie attempt to qualify at Toledo in 2004, but didn't make the field. He hasn't competed in any major form of motor sports since.

== Motorsports career results ==
=== NASCAR ===
(key) (Bold – Pole position awarded by qualifying time. Italics – Pole position earned by points standings or practice time. * – Most laps led.)

==== Winston Cup Series ====
NASCAR Winston Cup Series results
Year	Team	No.	Make	1	2	3	4	5	6	7	8	9	10	11	12	13	14	15	16	17	18	19	20	21	22	23	24	25	26	27	28	29	30	31	NWCC	Pts	Ref
1989	A. J. Foyt Enterprises	14	Olds	DAY	CAR	ATL	RCH	DAR	BRI	NWS	MAR	TAL	CLT; 24	DOV	SON	POC	MCH	DAY	POC	TAL	GLN	MCH; 20	BRI	DAR	RCH	DOV	MAR	CLT	NWS	CAR	PHO				56th	191	
1989	Donlavey Racing	90	Ford																													ATL; DNQ			56th	191	
1990	Leslie Racing	72	Olds	DAY	RCH	CAR	ATL	DAR	BRI	NWS	MAR	TAL	CLT; 36	DOV	SON	POC	MCH																		69th	150	
1990	Parker Racing	72	Olds															DAY; DNQ	POC	TAL; 38	GLN	MCH; DNQ	BRI	DAR	RCH	DOV	MAR	NWS	CLT; DNQ	CAR; 39	PHO	ATL			69th	150	
1991	Parker Racing	72	Olds	DAY	RCH	CAR	ATL	DAR	BRI	NWS	MAR	TAL	CLT	DOV	SON	POC	MCH	DAY	POC	TAL	GLN	MCH	BRI	DAR	RCH	DOV	MAR	NWS	CLT; DNQ	CAR	PHO	ATL			NA	-	
1995	Parker Racing	72	Chevy	DAY	CAR	RCH	ATL	DAR	BRI	NWS	MAR	TAL	SON	CLT	DOV	POC	MCH	DAY	NHA	POC	TAL	IND	GLN	MCH; DNQ	BRI	DAR	RCH	DOV	MAR	NWS	CLT	CAR	PHO	ATL	NA	-	
1996	Barkdoll Racing	73	Chevy	DAY; DNQ	CAR	RCH	ATL	DAR	BRI	NWS	MAR	TAL	SON	CLT	DOV	POC	MCH	DAY	NHA	POC	TAL	IND	GLN	MCH	BRI	DAR	RCH	DOV	MAR	NWS	CLT	CAR	PHO	ATL	NA	-	

===== Daytona 500 =====
Year	Team	Manufacturer	Start	Finish
1996	Barkdoll Racing	Chevrolet	DNQ	

==== Busch Series ====
NASCAR Busch Series results
Year	Team	No.	Make	1	2	3	4	5	6	7	8	9	10	11	12	13	14	15	16	17	18	19	20	21	22	23	24	25	26	27	28	29	30	31	NBSC	Pts	Ref
1991	Parker Racing	72	Olds	DAY; 35	RCH	CAR; 15	MAR; 22	VOL; 16	HCY; 14	DAR; 16	BRI; 8	LAN; 22	SBO; 19	NZH; 14	CLT; 17	DOV; 12	ROU; 20	HCY; 8	MYB; 29	GLN; 17	OXF; 4		SBO; 19	DUB; 19	IRP; 2	ROU; 10	BRI; 21	DAR; 13	RCH; 12	DOV; 28	CLT; 22	NHA; 33	CAR; 13	MAR; 24	15th	3326	
1991	Parker Racing	2	Olds																			NHA; 27													15th	3326	
1992	Parker Racing	72	Olds	DAY; 40	CAR; 6	RCH; 24	ATL; 7	MAR; 5	DAR; 8	BRI; 19	HCY; 17	LAN; 23	DUB; 17	NZH; 9	CLT; 39	DOV; 10	ROU; 11	MYB; 4	GLN; 21	VOL; 7	NHA; 27	TAL; 6	IRP; 22	ROU; 15	MCH; 22	NHA; 28	BRI; 17	DAR; 8	RCH; 23	DOV; 28	CLT; 17	MAR; 28	CAR; 33	HCY; 17	15th	3422	
1993	Parker Racing	72	Olds	DAY; 5	CAR; 37	RCH; 25	DAR; 7	BRI; 13	HCY; 13	ROU; 7	MAR; 24	NZH; 25		DOV; 28	MYB; 7	GLN; 7	MLW; 15		IRP; 1																11th	3336	
1993	Parker Racing	72	Chevy										**CLT**; 34					TAL; 4		MCH; 36	NHA; 28	BRI; 25	DAR; 6	RCH; 2	DOV; 8	ROU; 8	CLT; 23	MAR; 8	CAR; 6	HCY; 13	ATL; 30				11th	3336	
1994	Parker Racing	72	Chevy	DAY; 24	CAR; 17	RCH; 19	ATL; 5	MAR; 26	DAR; 11	HCY; 7	BRI; 12	ROU; 11	NHA; 28	NZH; 10	CLT; 38	DOV; 10	MYB; 19	GLN; 3	MLW; 18	SBO; 7	TAL; 10	HCY; 17	IRP; 14	MCH; 31	BRI; 7	DAR; 39	RCH; 26	DOV; 23	CLT; 29	MAR; 22	CAR; 20				11th	3088	
1995	Parker Racing	72	Chevy	DAY; 21	CAR; 12	RCH; 28	ATL; 32	NSV; 18	DAR; 12	BRI; 34	HCY; 27	NHA; 8	NZH; 27	CLT; 3	**DOV**; 24	MYB; 13	GLN; 19	MLW; 19	TAL; 23	SBO; 21	IRP; 4	MCH; 38	BRI; 18	DAR; 39	RCH; 13	DOV; 20	CLT; 25								16th	2530	
1995	Roger Brown Racing	86	Chevy																									CAR; DNQ	HOM; 43						16th	2530	
1995	Performax Racing	98	Chevy																									CAR; 36							16th	2530	
1996	Leslie Racing	11	Chevy	DAY; 36	CAR	RCH	ATL; 34	NSV	DAR; DNQ				CLT; 39	DOV	SBO	MYB	GLN	MLW	NHA	TAL; 28	IRP; 10	MCH; 19	BRI	DAR	RCH	DOV	CLT; 35	CAR	HOM; 19						50th	645	
1996	Bown Racing	51	Chevy							BRI; DNQ	HCY	NZH																							50th	645	
1997	Hensley Motorsports	63	Pontiac	DAY; 5	CAR; 28	RCH; 40	ATL; 37	LVS; 18	DAR; 9	HCY; 26	TEX; 10	BRI; 35	NSV; 25	TAL; 17	NHA; 20	NZH; 19	CLT	DOV; 27		GLN; 13	MLW; 9	MYB; 14	GTY; 16	IRP; 17	MCH; 34	BRI; 19	DAR; 19	RCH; 36							17th	2880	
1997	Hensley Motorsports	63	Chevy																SBO; 18										DOV; 7	CLT; 31	CAL; 15	CAR; 37	HOM; 20		17th	2880	
1998	Hensley Motorsports	63	Pontiac	DAY; 33	CAR; 13																														23rd	2338	
1998	Hensley Motorsports	63	Chevy			LVS; 23	NSV; 19	DAR; 38	BRI; 12	TEX; 18	HCY; 28	TAL; 19	NHA; 32	NZH; 37	CLT; 16	DOV; 31	RCH; 31	PPR; 26	GLN; 16	MLW; 20	MYB; 17	CAL; 31	SBO; 22	IRP; 30	MCH; 43	BRI; 11	DAR; 22	RCH; 15							23rd	2338	
1998	Donald Johnson	46	Chevy																										DOV; 32	CLT					23rd	2338	
1998	RC Racing	2	Chevy																												GTY; DNQ				23rd	2338	
1998	Beanie Racing	97	Chevy																													CAR; DNQ	ATL; DNQ	HOM	23rd	2338	

=== ARCA Re/Max Series ===
(key) (Bold – Pole position awarded by qualifying time. Italics – Pole position earned by points standings or practice time. * – Most laps led.)

ARCA Re/Max Series results
Year	Team	No.	Make	1	2	3	4	5	6	7	8	9	10	11	12	13	14	15	16	17	18	19	20	21	22	23	24	25	ARMC	Pts	Ref
1986	Marcis Auto Racing	21	Chevy	ATL	DAY	ATL	TAL	SIR	SSP	FRS	KIL	CSP	TAL	BLN	ISF	DSF	TOL	MCS	ATL; 21										NA	0	
1987	Don Biederman	71	Chevy	DAY	ATL	TAL	DEL	ACS	TOL	ROC	POC	FRS	KIL	TAL	FRS	ISF	INF	DSF	SLM	ATL; 37									NA	0	
1988	Don Biederman	72	Chevy	DAY; 6	ATL; 5	TAL; 8																ATL; 3							1st	4600	
1988	Don Biederman	72	Olds				FRS; 4	PCS; 22	ROC; 6	POC; 17	WIN; 1*	KIL; 8	**ACS**; 1*	SLM; 2	POC; 3		DEL; 1*	FRS; 1	**ISF**; 2	DSF; 21	SLM; 13								1st	4600	
1988	Don Biederman	72	Pontiac													TAL; 4													1st	4600	
1989	Leslie Racing	72	Pontiac	DAY; 27	ATL; 21	KIL; 12	TAL; 1*	FRS	POC; 3	KIL; 17	HAG; 12	POC; 32	TAL; 1*	DEL; 3	FRS; 24	ISF	TOL; 20*	DSF; 17	SLM; 27	ATL; 36									13th	2250	
1990	Leslie Racing	72	Olds	DAY; 27	ATL; 6		TAL; 2	FRS	POC; 2	KIL			**POC**; 23	TAL; 35	MCH; 1	ISF	TOL	DSF	WIN	DEL	ATL; 19								13th	1820	
1990	Leslie Racing	72	Ford			KIL; 25																							13th	1820	
1990	Leslie Racing	72	Pontiac								TOL; 6	HAG																	13th	1820	
1991	Parker Racing	72	Olds	DAY	ATL	KIL	TAL	TOL	FRS	POC	MCH	KIL	FRS	DEL	POC	TAL	HPT	MCH; 7	ISF	TOL	DSF	TWS	ATL						NA	0	
1994	Southtown Motorsports	81	Ford	DAY	TAL	FIF	LVL	KIL	TOL	FRS	MCH	DMS	POC	POC	KIL	FRS	INF	I70	ISF	DSF	TOL; 23	SLM	WIN	ATL					NA	0	
1999	Bowsher Motorsports	21	Ford	DAY	ATL	SLM	AND	CLT	MCH; 10	POC; 10	TOL; 10	**SBS**; 12	BLN; 5	POC; 8	KIL; 25	FRS; 7	FLM; 4	ISF; 13	WIN; 1	DSF; 3	SLM; 5	CLT; 39	TAL; 33						13th	3355	
1999	Team Rensi Motorsports	83	Chevy																					ATL; 35					13th	3355	
2000	Bowsher Motorsports	21	Ford	DAY; 26	SLM; 1	AND; 19	CLT; QL^{†}	KIL; 17	FRS; 20	MCH	POC	TOL	KEN	BLN; 20	POC														29th	1265	
2000	Cavil Councilor	58	Ford													WIN; 3	ISF												29th	1265	
2000	Cavin Councilor	19	Chevy															KEN; 14	DSF	SLM	CLT	TAL	ATL						29th	1265	
2001	Cavin Councilor	19	Chevy	DAY	NSH	WIN; 20	SLM; 18	GTY	KEN	CLT	KAN	MCH	POC	MEM	GLN; 32	KEN	MCH	POC; 6	NSH	ISF	CHI	DSF	SLM; 22	TOL	BLN; DNQ	CLT	TAL	ATL	52nd	675	
2004	Lee Leslie	3	Ford	DAY	NSH	SLM	KEN	TOL	CLT	KAN	POC	MCH	SBO	BLN	KEN	GTW	POC	LER	NSH	ISF	TOL; DNQ	DSF	CHI	SLM	TAL				NA	-	
^{†} – Qualified but replaced by Jeff Finley

Sporting positions
Preceded by Bill Venturini	ARCA Series Champion; 1988	Succeeded by Bob Keselowski
