= Roy Payne (racing driver) =

American racing driver (born 1967)

Roy Payne (born November 11, 1967) is a former American stock car racing driver from Alvin, Texas. Payne competed in 44 NASCAR Busch Series races between 1993 and 1995, reaching the top-ten twice. Payne competed in 41 ARCA races between 1991 and 1992, achieving one win, 17 top-ten finishes, and four pole positions.
