= 1994 The Bud at The Glen =

20th race of the 1994 NASCAR Winston Cup Series

Race details
- Race 20 of 31 in the 1994 NASCAR Winston Cup Series
- The 1994 The Bud at The Glen program cover.
- Date: August 14, 1994
- Official name: 9th Annual The Bud at The Glen
- Location: Watkins Glen, New York, Watkins Glen International
- Course: Permanent racing facility
- Course length: 2.45 miles (3.943 km)
- Distance: 90 laps, 220.5 mi (354.86 km)
- Scheduled distance: 90 laps, 220.5 mi (354.86 km)
- Average speed: 93.752 miles per hour (150.879 km/h)

Pole position
Driver	Mark Martin	Roush Racing
- Time: 1:14.540

Most laps led
Driver	Mark Martin	Roush Racing
- Laps: 75

Winner
No. 6	Mark Martin	Roush Racing

Television in the United States
- Network: ESPN
- Announcers: Bob Jenkins, Ned Jarrett, Benny Parsons

Radio in the United States
- Radio: Motor Racing Network

The 1994 The Bud at The Glen was the 20th stock car race of the 1994 NASCAR Winston Cup Series season and the ninth iteration of the event. The race was held on Sunday, August 14, 1994, in Watkins Glen, New York, at the shortened layout of Watkins Glen International, a 2.45-mile (3.94 km) permanent road course layout. The race took the scheduled 90 laps to complete. At race's end, Roush Racing driver Mark Martin would manage to dominate the majority of the race to take his 13th career NASCAR Winston Cup Series victory and his first victory of the season. To fill out the top three, Robert Yates Racing driver Ernie Irvan and Richard Childress Racing driver Dale Earnhardt would finish second and third, respectively.

== Background ==
The layout of Watkins Glen International NASCAR uses.

Watkins Glen International (nicknamed "The Glen") is an automobile race track located in Watkins Glen, New York at the southern tip of Seneca Lake. It was long known around the world as the home of the Formula One United States Grand Prix, which it hosted for twenty consecutive years (1961–1980), but the site has been home to road racing of nearly every class, including the World Sportscar Championship, Trans-Am, Can-Am, NASCAR Sprint Cup Series, the International Motor Sports Association and the IndyCar Series.

Initially, public roads in the village were used for the race course. In 1956 a permanent circuit for the race was built. In 1968 the race was extended to six hours, becoming the 6 Hours of Watkins Glen. The circuit's current layout has more or less been the same since 1971, although a chicane was installed at the uphill Esses in 1975 to slow cars through these corners, where there was a fatality during practice at the 1973 United States Grand Prix. The chicane was removed in 1985, but another chicane called the "Inner Loop" was installed in 1992 after J. D. McDuffie's fatal accident during the previous year's NASCAR Winston Cup event.

The circuit is known as the Mecca of North American road racing and is a very popular venue among fans and drivers. The facility is currently owned by NASCAR.

=== Entry list ===
- (R) denotes rookie driver.

No.	Driver	Team	Make
00	Scott Gaylord	Oliver Racing	Ford
1	Rick Mast	Precision Products Racing	Ford
2	Rusty Wallace	Penske Racing South	Ford
3	Dale Earnhardt	Richard Childress Racing	Chevrolet
03	Butch Leitzinger	Butch Leitzinger Racing	Chevrolet
4	Sterling Marlin	Morgan–McClure Motorsports	Chevrolet
5	Terry Labonte	Hendrick Motorsports	Chevrolet
6	Mark Martin	Roush Racing	Ford
7	Geoff Bodine	Geoff Bodine Racing	Ford
8	Jeff Burton (R)	Stavola Brothers Racing	Ford
10	Ricky Rudd	Rudd Performance Motorsports	Ford
11	Bill Elliott	Junior Johnson & Associates	Ford
12	Derrike Cope	Bobby Allison Motorsports	Ford
15	Lake Speed	Bud Moore Engineering	Ford
16	Ted Musgrave	Roush Racing	Ford
17	Darrell Waltrip	Darrell Waltrip Motorsports	Chevrolet
18	Dale Jarrett	Joe Gibbs Racing	Chevrolet
19	Loy Allen Jr. (R)	TriStar Motorsports	Ford
21	Morgan Shepherd	Wood Brothers Racing	Ford
22	Bobby Labonte	Bill Davis Racing	Pontiac
23	Hut Stricklin	Travis Carter Enterprises	Ford
24	Jeff Gordon	Hendrick Motorsports	Chevrolet
25	Ken Schrader	Hendrick Motorsports	Chevrolet
26	Brett Bodine	King Racing	Ford
27	Jimmy Spencer	Junior Johnson & Associates	Ford
28	Ernie Irvan	Robert Yates Racing	Ford
29	Steve Grissom	Diamond Ridge Motorsports	Chevrolet
30	Michael Waltrip	Bahari Racing	Pontiac
31	Ward Burton	A.G. Dillard Motorsports	Chevrolet
32	Dick Trickle	Active Motorsports	Chevrolet
33	Harry Gant	Leo Jackson Motorsports	Chevrolet
34	Mike McLaughlin	Team 34	Chevrolet
39	Scott Lagasse	Roulo Brothers Racing	Chevrolet
40	Bobby Hamilton	SABCO Racing	Pontiac
41	Joe Nemechek (R)	Larry Hedrick Motorsports	Chevrolet
42	Kyle Petty	SABCO Racing	Pontiac
43	Wally Dallenbach Jr.	Petty Enterprises	Pontiac
50	Brian Bonner	A. J. Foyt Racing	Ford
55	Jimmy Hensley	RaDiUs Motorsports	Ford
71	Dave Marcis	Marcis Auto Racing	Chevrolet
75	Todd Bodine	Butch Mock Motorsports	Ford
77	Greg Sacks	U.S. Motorsports Inc.	Ford
88	P. J. Jones	U.S. Motorsports Inc.	Ford
90	Mike Wallace (R)	Donlavey Racing	Ford
98	Jeremy Mayfield (R)	Cale Yarborough Motorsports	Ford

== Qualifying ==
Qualifying was split into two rounds. The first round was held on Friday, August 12, at 3:00 PM EST. Each driver would have one lap to set a time. During the first round, the top 20 drivers in the round would be guaranteed a starting spot in the race. If a driver was not able to guarantee a spot in the first round, they had the option to scrub their time from the first round and try and run a faster lap time in a second round qualifying run, held on Saturday, August 12, at 11:00 AM EST. As with the first round, each driver would have one lap to set a time. For this specific race, positions 21-38 would be decided on time, and depending on who needed it, a select amount of positions were given to cars who had not otherwise qualified but were high enough in owner's points; up to two provisionals were given. If needed, a past champion who did not qualify on either time or provisionals could use a champion's provisional, adding one more spot to the field.

Mark Martin, driving for Roush Racing, would win the pole, setting a time of 1:14.540 and an average speed of 118.326 mph (190.427 km/h) in the first round.

Five drivers would fail to qualify.

=== Full qualifying results ===
Pos.	No.	Driver	Team	Make	Time	Speed
1	6	Mark Martin	Roush Racing	Ford	1:14.540	118.326
2	25	Ken Schrader	Hendrick Motorsports	Chevrolet	1:14.616	118.205
3	24	Jeff Gordon	Hendrick Motorsports	Chevrolet	1:14.671	118.118
4	28	Ernie Irvan	Robert Yates Racing	Ford	1:14.782	117.943
5	2	Rusty Wallace	Penske Racing South	Ford	1:14.817	117.888
6	3	Dale Earnhardt	Richard Childress Racing	Chevrolet	1:14.898	117.760
7	10	Ricky Rudd	Rudd Performance Motorsports	Ford	1:14.994	117.609
8	11	Bill Elliott	Junior Johnson & Associates	Ford	1:15.204	117.281
9	43	Wally Dallenbach Jr.	Petty Enterprises	Pontiac	1:15.226	117.247
10	5	Terry Labonte	Hendrick Motorsports	Chevrolet	1:15.256	117.200
11	21	Morgan Shepherd	Wood Brothers Racing	Ford	1:15.350	117.054
12	22	Bobby Labonte	Bill Davis Racing	Pontiac	1:15.421	116.944
13	17	Darrell Waltrip	Darrell Waltrip Motorsports	Chevrolet	1:15.475	116.860
14	18	Dale Jarrett	Joe Gibbs Racing	Chevrolet	1:15.541	116.758
15	7	Geoff Bodine	Geoff Bodine Racing	Ford	1:15.543	116.755
16	26	Brett Bodine	King Racing	Ford	1:15.690	116.528
17	12	Derrike Cope	Bobby Allison Motorsports	Ford	1:15.728	116.469
18	23	Hut Stricklin	Travis Carter Enterprises	Ford	1:15.774	116.399
19	30	Michael Waltrip	Bahari Racing	Pontiac	1:15.782	116.386
20	42	Kyle Petty	SABCO Racing	Pontiac	1:15.798	116.362
Failed to lock in Round 1
21	15	Lake Speed	Bud Moore Engineering	Ford	1:15.970	116.098
22	4	Sterling Marlin	Morgan–McClure Motorsports	Chevrolet	1:16.004	116.047
23	41	Joe Nemechek (R)	Larry Hedrick Motorsports	Chevrolet	1:16.048	115.979
24	75	Todd Bodine	Butch Mock Motorsports	Ford	1:16.097	115.905
25	33	Harry Gant	Leo Jackson Motorsports	Chevrolet	1:16.186	115.769
26	39	Scott Lagasse	Roulo Brothers Racing	Chevrolet	1:16.209	115.734
27	27	Tommy Kendall	Junior Johnson & Associates	Ford	1:16.217	115.722
28	34	Mike McLaughlin	Team 34	Chevrolet	1:16.227	115.707
29	16	Ted Musgrave	Roush Racing	Ford	1:16.351	115.519
30	31	Ward Burton (R)	A.G. Dillard Motorsports	Chevrolet	1:16.369	115.492
31	40	Bobby Hamilton	SABCO Racing	Pontiac	1:16.770	114.889
32	29	Steve Grissom (R)	Diamond Ridge Motorsports	Chevrolet	1:16.785	114.866
33	32	Dick Trickle	Active Motorsports	Chevrolet	1:16.974	114.584
34	71	Dave Marcis	Marcis Auto Racing	Chevrolet	1:17.098	114.400
35	88	P. J. Jones	U.S. Motorsports Inc.	Ford	1:17.350	114.027
36	8	Jeff Burton (R)	Stavola Brothers Racing	Ford	1:17.385	113.976
37	55	Jimmy Hensley	RaDiUs Motorsports	Ford	1:17.612	113.642
38	03	Butch Leitzinger	Butch Leitzinger Racing	Chevrolet	1:17.885	113.244
Provisionals
39	1	Rick Mast	Precision Products Racing	Ford	-*	-*
40	77	Greg Sacks	U.S. Motorsports Inc.	Ford	-*	-*
Failed to qualify
41	00	Scott Gaylord	Oliver Racing	Ford	-*	-*
42	19	Loy Allen Jr. (R)	TriStar Motorsports	Ford	-*	-*
43	98	Jeremy Mayfield (R)	Cale Yarborough Motorsports	Ford	-*	-*
44	90	Mike Wallace (R)	Donlavey Racing	Ford	-*	-*
45	50	Brian Bonner	A. J. Foyt Racing	Ford	-*	-*
Official first round qualifying results
Official starting lineup

== Race results ==
Fin	St	No.	Driver	Team	Make	Laps	Led	Status	Pts	Winnings
1	1	6	Mark Martin	Roush Racing	Ford	90	75	running	185	$85,100
2	4	28	Ernie Irvan	Robert Yates Racing	Ford	90	0	running	170	$42,015
3	6	3	Dale Earnhardt	Richard Childress Racing	Chevrolet	90	5	running	170	$39,605
4	2	25	Ken Schrader	Hendrick Motorsports	Chevrolet	90	0	running	160	$26,245
5	7	10	Ricky Rudd	Rudd Performance Motorsports	Ford	90	3	running	160	$20,875
6	10	5	Terry Labonte	Hendrick Motorsports	Chevrolet	90	0	running	150	$22,810
7	13	17	Darrell Waltrip	Darrell Waltrip Motorsports	Chevrolet	90	5	running	151	$18,890
8	23	41	Joe Nemechek (R)	Larry Hedrick Motorsports	Chevrolet	90	0	running	142	$16,980
9	3	24	Jeff Gordon	Hendrick Motorsports	Chevrolet	90	0	running	138	$19,950
10	25	33	Harry Gant	Leo Jackson Motorsports	Chevrolet	90	0	running	134	$18,910
11	14	18	Dale Jarrett	Joe Gibbs Racing	Chevrolet	90	0	running	130	$20,250
12	8	11	Bill Elliott	Junior Johnson & Associates	Ford	90	0	running	127	$15,810
13	21	15	Lake Speed	Bud Moore Engineering	Ford	90	2	running	129	$18,420
14	9	43	Wally Dallenbach Jr.	Petty Enterprises	Pontiac	90	0	running	121	$16,280
15	24	75	Todd Bodine	Butch Mock Motorsports	Ford	90	0	running	118	$11,340
16	11	21	Morgan Shepherd	Wood Brothers Racing	Ford	90	0	running	115	$17,870
17	5	2	Rusty Wallace	Penske Racing South	Ford	90	0	running	112	$19,950
18	12	22	Bobby Labonte	Bill Davis Racing	Pontiac	89	0	running	109	$14,430
19	29	16	Ted Musgrave	Roush Racing	Ford	89	0	running	106	$14,175
20	19	30	Michael Waltrip	Bahari Racing	Pontiac	89	0	running	103	$14,630
21	34	71	Dave Marcis	Marcis Auto Racing	Chevrolet	89	0	running	100	$9,655
22	27	27	Tommy Kendall	Junior Johnson & Associates	Ford	88	0	running	97	$9,435
23	32	29	Steve Grissom (R)	Diamond Ridge Motorsports	Chevrolet	88	0	running	94	$9,740
24	30	31	Ward Burton (R)	A.G. Dillard Motorsports	Chevrolet	88	0	running	91	$6,880
25	36	8	Jeff Burton (R)	Stavola Brothers Racing	Ford	88	0	running	88	$13,145
26	22	4	Sterling Marlin	Morgan–McClure Motorsports	Chevrolet	88	0	running	85	$16,785
27	28	34	Mike McLaughlin	Team 34	Chevrolet	87	0	running	82	$6,675
28	16	26	Brett Bodine	King Racing	Ford	87	0	running	79	$12,915
29	15	7	Geoff Bodine	Geoff Bodine Racing	Ford	86	0	running	76	$12,755
30	18	23	Hut Stricklin	Travis Carter Enterprises	Ford	86	0	running	73	$8,595
31	38	03	Butch Leitzinger	Butch Leitzinger Racing	Chevrolet	81	0	oil leak	70	$6,330
32	33	32	Dick Trickle	Active Motorsports	Chevrolet	80	0	running	67	$8,265
33	37	55	Jimmy Hensley	RaDiUs Motorsports	Ford	75	0	running	64	$6,205
34	31	40	Bobby Hamilton	SABCO Racing	Pontiac	70	0	running	61	$12,145
35	35	88	P. J. Jones	U.S. Motorsports Inc.	Ford	67	0	fumes	58	$6,085
36	26	39	Scott Lagasse	Roulo Brothers Racing	Chevrolet	65	0	running	55	$6,055
37	20	42	Kyle Petty	SABCO Racing	Pontiac	59	0	running	52	$18,000
38	39	1	Rick Mast	Precision Products Racing	Ford	32	0	crash	49	$11,465
39	40	77	Greg Sacks	U.S. Motorsports Inc.	Ford	7	0	engine	46	$5,965
40	17	12	Derrike Cope	Bobby Allison Motorsports	Ford	5	0	engine	43	$9,965
Official race results

== Standings after the race ==
Drivers' Championship standings

	Pos	Driver	Points
	1	Dale Earnhardt	3,053
	2	Ernie Irvan	3,026 (–27)
	3	Rusty Wallace	2,727 (–326)
	4	Mark Martin	2,724 (–329)
	5	Ken Schrader	2,688 (–365)
1	6	Ricky Rudd	2,629 (–424)
1	7	Morgan Shepherd	2,597 (–456)
1	8	Jeff Gordon	2,401 (–652)
1	9	Michael Waltrip	2,397 (–656)
	10	Lake Speed	2,343 (–710)
Official driver's standings

- Note: Only the first 10 positions are included for the driver standings.

Previous race: 1994 Brickyard 400	NASCAR Winston Cup Series; 1994 season	Next race: 1994 GM Goodwrench Dealer 400
