= Darryl Sage =

American racing driver

- Born: May 8, 1965 (age 61); Murfreesboro, Tennessee, U.S.

NASCAR Cup Series career
- 8 races run over 2 years
- Best finish: 50th (1982)
- First race: 1982 Busch Nashville 420 (Nashville)
- Last race: 1983 Busch Nashville 420 (Nashville)
| Wins | Top tens | Poles |
|---|---|---|
| 0 | 0 | 0 |

NASCAR O'Reilly Auto Parts Series career
- 5 races run over 4 years
- Best finish: 102nd (1995)
- First race: 1982 Goody's 300 (Daytona)
- Last race: 1995 Carolina Pride/Red Dog 250 (Myrtle Beach)
| Wins | Top tens | Poles |
|---|---|---|
| 0 | 0 | 0 |

ARCA Menards Series career
- 6 races run over 2 years
- Best finish: 40th (2003)
- First race: 1983 Daytona ARCA 200 (Daytona)
- Last race: 2003 ReadyHosting.com 200 (Chicagoland)
| Wins | Top tens | Poles |
|---|---|---|
| 0 | 2 | 0 |
- Statistics up to date as of April 11, 2024.

Darryl Sage (born May 8, 1965) is an American former professional stock car racing driver who has previously competed in the NASCAR Winston Cup Series, the NASCAR Busch Series, and the ARCA Re/Max Series.

Sage made his debut in the NASCAR Winston Cup Series at Nashville Fairgrounds Speedway at the age of seventeen, where he started 25th and finished twenty laps down in sixteenth. He then made seven more starts between 1982 and 1983. He also made select starts in the NASCAR Budweiser Late Model Sportsman Series around this time, getting a best finish of sixteenth at Daytona International Speedway.

Sage also made six starts in the ARCA Re/Max Series in 1983, where he got a best finish of twelve at Nashville in the former year, and getting two top-tens in 2003 while driving for Keith Murt. He has not competed in any racing series since 2003.

== Motorsports career results ==
=== NASCAR ===
(key) (Bold - Pole position awarded by qualifying time. Italics - Pole position earned by points standings or practice time. * – Most laps led.)

==== Winston Cup Series ====
NASCAR Winston Cup Series results
| Year | Team | No. | Make | 1 | 2 | 3 | 4 | 5 | 6 | 7 | 8 | 9 | 10 | 11 | 12 | 13 | 14 | 15 | 16 | 17 | 18 | 19 | 20 | 21 | 22 | 23 | 24 | 25 | 26 | 27 | 28 | 29 | 30 | NWCC | Pts | Ref |
|---|---|---|---|---|---|---|---|---|---|---|---|---|---|---|---|---|---|---|---|---|---|---|---|---|---|---|---|---|---|---|---|---|---|---|---|---|
| 1982 | Sage Racing | 86 | Chevy | DAY | RCH | BRI | ATL | CAR | DAR | NWS | MAR | TAL | NSV | DOV | CLT | POC | RSD | MCH | DAY | NSV; 16 | POC | TAL | MCH | BRI; 17 | DAR | RCH; 18 | DOV | NWS | CLT | MAR; 30 | CAR | ATL; 22 | RSD | 50th | 324 | |
| 1983 | Sage Racing | 86 | Chevy | DAY; DNQ | RCH; DNQ | CAR | ATL; 20 | DAR | NWS | MAR | TAL | NSV; 26 | DOV | BRI | CLT | RSD | POC | MCH | DAY | NSV; 26 | POC | TAL | MCH | BRI | DAR | RCH | DOV | MAR | NWS | CLT | CAR | ATL | RSD | 85th | 103 | |

===== Daytona 500 =====
| Year | Team | Manufacturer | Start | Finish |
|---|---|---|---|---|
| 1983 | Sage Racing | Chevrolet | DNQ | |

==== Busch Series ====
NASCAR Busch Series results
| Year | Team | No. | Make | 1 | 2 | 3 | 4 | 5 | 6 | 7 | 8 | 9 | 10 | 11 | 12 | 13 | 14 | 15 | 16 | 17 | 18 | 19 | 20 | 21 | 22 | 23 | 24 | 25 | 26 | 27 | 28 | 29 | 30 | 31 | 32 | 33 | 34 | 35 | NBSC | Pts | Ref |
|---|---|---|---|---|---|---|---|---|---|---|---|---|---|---|---|---|---|---|---|---|---|---|---|---|---|---|---|---|---|---|---|---|---|---|---|---|---|---|---|---|---|
| 1982 | N/A | 19 | Pontiac | DAY; 24 | RCH | BRI | MAR | DAR | HCY | SBO | CRW | RCH | LGY | DOV | HCY | | | | | | | | | | | | | | | | | | | | | | | | 109th | 146 | |
| 1982 | N/A | 18 | Pontiac | | | | | | | | | | | | | CLT; 36 | ASH | HCY | SBO | CAR | CRW | SBO | HCY | LGY | IRP | BRI | HCY | RCH | MAR | | | | | | | | | | 109th | 146 | |
| 1982 | N/A | 86 | Pontiac | | | | | | | | | | | | | | | | | | | | | | | | | | | CLT; DNQ | HCY | MAR | | | | | | | 109th | 146 | |
| 1983 | Sage Racing | 66 | Pontiac | DAY; 16 | RCH | CAR | HCY | MAR | NWS | SBO | GPS | LGY | DOV | BRI | CLT | SBO | HCY | ROU | SBO | ROU | CRW | ROU | SBO | HCY | LGY | IRP | GPS | BRI | HCY | DAR | RCH | NWS | SBO | MAR | ROU | | | | 103rd | 152 | |
| 1983 | Sage Racing | 86 | Pontiac | | | | | | | | | | | | | | | | | | | | | | | | | | | | | | | | | CLT; 42 | HCY | MAR | 103rd | 152 | |
| 1995 | Day Enterprises | 16 | Chevy | DAY; DNQ | CAR | RCH | ATL | NSV | DAR | BRI | HCY | NHA | NZH | CLT | DOV | MYB; 33 | GLN | MLW | TAL | SBO | IRP | MCH | BRI | DAR | RCH | DOV | CLT | CAR | HOM | | | | | | | | | | 102nd | 64 | |
| 1996 | Day Enterprise Racing | 16 | Pontiac | DAY; QL† | CAR | RCH | ATL | NSV; DNQ | DAR | BRI | HCY | NZH | CLT; DNQ | DOV | SBO | MYB | GLN | MLW | NHA | TAL | IRP | MCH | BRI | DAR | RCH | DOV | CLT | CAR | HOM | | | | | | | | | | N/A | 0 | |
^{†} - Qualified but replaced by Chuck Bown

=== ARCA Re/Max Series ===
(key) (Bold – Pole position awarded by qualifying time. Italics – Pole position earned by points standings or practice time. * – Most laps led.)

ARCA Re/Max Series results
| Year | Team | No. | Make | 1 | 2 | 3 | 4 | 5 | 6 | 7 | 8 | 9 | 10 | 11 | 12 | 13 | 14 | 15 | 16 | 17 | 18 | 19 | 20 | 21 | 22 | ARSC | Pts | Ref |
|---|---|---|---|---|---|---|---|---|---|---|---|---|---|---|---|---|---|---|---|---|---|---|---|---|---|---|---|---|
| 1983 | Sage Racing | 86 | Pontiac | DAY; 22 | NSV; 12 | TAL | LPR | LPR | ISF | IRP | SSP | FRS | BFS | WIN | LPR | POC | TAL | MCS | FRS | MIL | DSF | ZAN | SND | | | N/A | 0 | |
| 2003 | KLM Motorsports | 29 | Chevy | DAY | ATL | NSH; 5 | | | | | | | | | | | NSH; 35 | ISF | WIN | DSF | | | | CLT; DNQ | SBO | 40th | 680 | |
| 2003 | KLM Motorsports | 19 | Chevy | | | | SLM; 20 | TOL | KEN | CLT | BLN | KAN | MCH | LER | POC | POC | | | | | CHI; 6 | SLM; DNQ | TAL | | | 40th | 680 | |
