= Tim Fedewa =

American racing driver (born 1967)

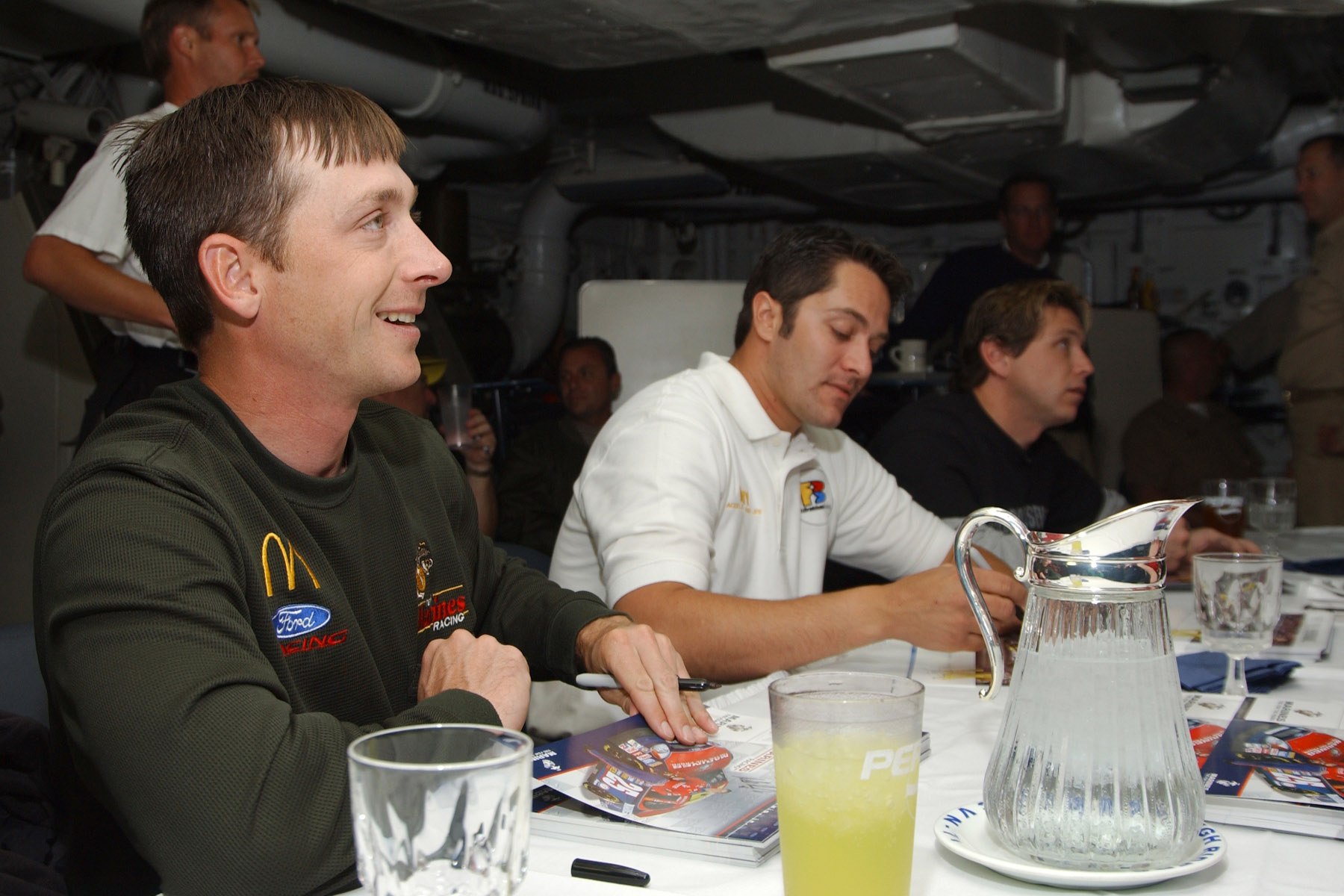
- Fedewa (right) signing autographs for members of the U.S. military in 2005 with Ashton Lewis Jr. (left) and David Stremme (middle)
- Born: May 9, 1967 (age 59); Holt, Michigan, U.S.
- Awards: 1989 ARTGO Rookie of the Year; 1991 ASA Rookie of the Year (1991)

NASCAR Cup Series career
- 1 race run over 1 year
- Best finish: 64th (1994)
- First race: 1994 SplitFire Spark Plug 500 (Dover)
Wins	Top tens	Poles
0	0	0

NASCAR O'Reilly Auto Parts Series career
- 333 races run over 14 years
- Best finish: 7th (1995, 1998)
- First race: 1992 Mark III Vans 200 (Darlington)
- Last race: 2005 (ITT Industries & Goulds Pumps Salute to the Troops 250 (Pikes Peak)
- First win: 1995 Meridian Advantage 200 (Nazareth)
- Last win: 2000 Busch 200 (New Hampshire)
Wins	Top tens	Poles
4	66	4

NASCAR FedEx Freight Truck Series career
- 9 races run over 3 years
- Best finish: 32nd (2005)
- First race: 2002 Florida Dodge Dealers 250 (Daytona)
- Last race: 2006 Smith's Las Vegas 350 (Las Vegas)
Wins	Top tens	Poles
0	1	0
- Statistics up to date as of December 5, 2023.

Timothy Troy Fedewa (pronounced "fee-doo-wuh"; born May 9, 1967) is an American professional racing driver and spotter. He works for Team Penske as the spotter for Ryan Blaney's No. 12 Ford Mustang Dark Horse in the NASCAR Cup Series.

As a driver, Fedewa previously competed in the NASCAR Busch Series (now O'Reilly's), NASCAR Craftsman Truck Series, American Speed Association and ARTGO. As a spotter, Fedewa previously worked for Stewart–Haas Racing as a spotter in the Cup Series for their No. 4 car driven by Kevin Harvick and in the Xfinity Series for their No. 98 car driven by Riley Herbst.

== Racing career ==
=== Driving career ===
After winning Rookie of the Year award in the ARTGO Challenge Series Fedewa went on to join the American Speed Association. Fedewa scored one top-five finish. A third place at Winchester (Indiana) Speedway, And five top tens on his way to the ASA's Pat Schauer rookie of the award in 1991. During Fedewa's time in the ASA, his car owners Ray and Diane Dewitt also owned the RaDIUS team that fielded cars for former ASA standout Ted Musgrave in the NASCAR Winston Cup Series.

Fedewa drove the No. 55 D-R Racing Enterprises Ford. Fedewa's NASCAR career began when he started racing full-time in the NASCAR Busch Series for the 1993 season. He would finish second for Rookie of the Year honors, and in the five years that followed, he won three races and finished in the top-ten in points four times; his highest finishes were seventh in both 1995 and 1998.

Fedewa made one Cup start in 1994 for Ray DeWitt at Dover; he finished 23rd. He made a brief return to the series in 2000 in a relief appearance at the Coca-Cola 600, substituting for injured Petty Enterprises driver John Andretti.

He began piloting the No. 36 Chevrolet Monte Carlo for Cicci-Welliver Racing in 1999 and would continue to for two-and-a-half years, until he and the team parted ways during the 2001 season. After parting ways in the middle of the 2001 season, Fedewa made sporadic appearances in the rest of the 2001 and in the 2002 season. His best finish in this stretch came at the 2002 Aaron's 312 at Talladega, where he finished in the top-five for the Biagi Brothers 07 Pontiac.

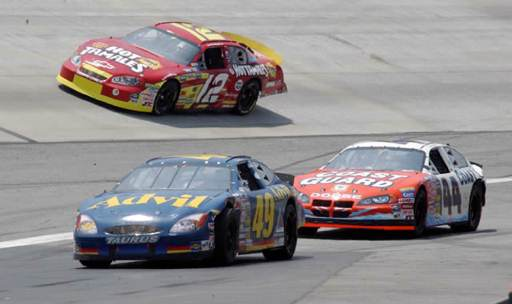
Fedewa's No. 12 (background) on the track at the MBNA 200 Busch Series race at Dover in 2004

After acting as spotter to Bill Elliott and then later to Kerry Earnhardt, he was ironically hired by FitzBradshaw Racing in 2003 to replace Earnhardt in the No. 12 Dodge. In racing for the team, Fedewa reached as high as ninth in the 2004 points standings before dropping to 16th by the end of the season. Fedewa's second place finish stands as the best finish of any Fitz Bradshaw driver ever.

In 2005, Fedewa failed to finish in the top-ten in 21 Busch Series starts, and was subsequently released by FitzBradshaw Racing on July 25, 2005. A week later, he was signed by Glynn Motorsports, a NASCAR Craftsman Truck Series team, to drive the No. 65 Dodge. He raced in seven events for the team; his highest finish was tenth at Las Vegas Motor Speedway. Fedewa's last NASCAR start as a driver came in the Truck Series in 2006 when he drove the No. 40 for Key Motorsports at Las Vegas, finishing 29th.

=== Spotting career ===
After he was unable to find a ride as a driver in NASCAR in 2007, Fedewa became a spotter, joining the new Red Bull Racing Team as the spotter for their No. 84 Toyota Camry driven by rookie A. J. Allmendinger. Fedewa remained the spotter of the car in 2009 when it was renumbered to the No. 82 driven by rookie Scott Speed.

Fedewa would eventually move to Richard Petty Motorsports to serve as the spotter for their No. 9 car driven by Marcos Ambrose.

In 2014, Fedewa left RPM and went to Stewart–Haas Racing when Kevin Harvick joined the team from Richard Childress Racing to drive their No. 4 car (previously the No. 39 driven by Ryan Newman). They won the 2014 Cup Series championship in their first year together.

In 2016, in addition to Harvick's No. 4 SHR car in the Cup Series, Fedewa spotted for the No. 88 JR Motorsports car in the Xfinity Series in select races, Spencer Gallagher's No. 23 in the Truck Series for GMS Racing, Noah Gragson's No. 7 car for Jefferson Pitts Racing in the K&N Pro Series East and West, and Chad Finley's No. 51 car in the ARCA Racing Series.

Fedewa also started spotting for SHR in the Xfinity Series when they started fielding two full-time cars, with the addition of the No. 98 (formerly of Biagi-DenBeste Racing) driven by Chase Briscoe. When Briscoe moved up to the Cup Series full-time for SHR in 2021, Fedewa remained the spotter of the No. 98 Xfinity Series car with new driver Riley Herbst. Fedewa would remain Harvick's spotter in the Cup Series all the way through his retirement from driving full-time in NASCAR in 2023 for a total of ten years together.

In 2024, Fedewa did not continue with SHR and the No. 4 car with new driver Josh Berry and instead moved to Team Penske to spot for defending Cup Series champion Ryan Blaney's No. 12 car, replacing Josh Williams after he left the team.

== Personal life ==
Fedewa's uncle Gary, father Butch, multiple cousins, grandmother Hilda, and grandfather Willie were also racing drivers. The Fedewa family eventually moved from Michigan to North Carolina so Butch and his wife/Tim's mother Sharon could support their son's NASCAR career.

Fedewa is married to model Kellee Meadows and they have one child, Willow Josephine Fedewa, born on January 8, 2009.

== Motorsports career results ==
=== NASCAR ===
(key) (Bold – Pole position awarded by qualifying time. Italics – Pole position earned by points standings or practice time. * – Most laps led.)

==== Winston Cup Series ====
NASCAR Winston Cup Series results
Year	Team	No.	Make	1	2	3	4	5	6	7	8	9	10	11	12	13	14	15	16	17	18	19	20	21	22	23	24	25	26	27	28	29	30	31	32	33	34	NWCC	Pts	Ref
1994	RaDiUs Motorsports	55	Ford	DAY	CAR	RCH	ATL	DAR	BRI	NWS	MAR	TAL	SON	CLT	DOV	POC	MCH	DAY	NHA	POC	TAL	IND	GLN	MCH	BRI	DAR	RCH	DOV; 23	MAR; DNQ	NWS; DNQ	CLT	CAR	PHO	ATL; DNQ				64th	94	
1999	LJ Racing	91	Chevy	DAY	CAR	LVS	ATL	DAR	TEX	BRI	MAR	TAL	CAL	RCH	CLT	DOV	MCH	POC	SON	DAY	NHA	POC	IND	GLN	MCH	BRI	DAR	RCH	NHA	DOV	MAR; DNQ	CLT	TAL	CAR	PHO	HOM	ATL	N/A	0	

==== Busch Series ====
NASCAR Busch Series results
Year	Team	No.	Make	1	2	3	4	5	6	7	8	9	10	11	12	13	14	15	16	17	18	19	20	21	22	23	24	25	26	27	28	29	30	31	32	33	34	35	NBSC	Pts	Ref
1992	RaDiUs Motorsports	55	Ford	DAY	CAR	RCH	ATL	MAR	DAR; 36	BRI	HCY	LAN	DUB	NZH											MCH; 27	NHA	BRI	DAR	RCH	DOV	CLT; 19	MAR	CAR	HCY					63rd	301	
1992	RaDiUs Motorsports	24	Ford												CLT; 35	DOV	ROU	MYB	GLN	VOL	NHA	TAL	IRP	ROU															63rd	301	
1993	RaDiUs Motorsports	55	Ford	DAY; 24	CAR; 32	RCH; 16	DAR; 41	BRI; 16	HCY	ROU; 18	MAR; 12	NZH; 7	CLT	DOV; 20	MYB; 25	GLN; 11	MLW; 7	TAL; 12	IRP; 5	MCH; 38	NHA; 6	BRI; 13	DAR; 15	RCH; 17	DOV; 15	ROU; 12	CLT; 25	MAR; 12	CAR; 17	HCY; DNQ	ATL; 24								18th	2275	
1994	RaDiUs Motorsports	55	Ford	DAY; 31	CAR; 16	RCH; 9	ATL; 30	MAR; 7	DAR; 9	HCY; 25	BRI; 23	ROU; 18	NHA; 11	NZH; 7	CLT; 13	DOV; 6	MYB; 13	GLN; 24	MLW; 28	SBO; 30	TAL; 20	HCY; 10	IRP; 21	MCH; 7	BRI; 19	DAR; 20	RCH; 21	DOV; 17	CLT; 13	MAR; 4	CAR; 38								10th	3125	
1995	RaDiUs Motorsports	55	Ford	DAY; 28	CAR; 34	RCH; 17	ATL; 4	NSV; 12	**DAR**; 23	BRI; 11	HCY; 15	NHA; 15	NZH; 1*	CLT; 19	DOV; 22	MYB; 11	GLN; 20	MLW; 15	TAL; 28	SBO; 12	IRP; 11	MCH; 25	BRI; 3	DAR; 25	RCH; 26	DOV; 19	CLT; 13	CAR; 12	HOM; 2										7th	3022	
1996	Taylor Motorsports	40	Ford	DAY; DNQ	CAR; 25	RCH; 27	ATL; 22	NSV; 25	DAR; 28	BRI; 26	HCY; 12	NZH; 8	CLT; 17	DOV; 39	SBO; 16	MYB; 20	GLN; 18	MLW; 26	NHA; 38	TAL; 15	IRP; 4	MCH; 40	BRI; 21	DAR; 42	RCH; 41	DOV; 21	CLT; 17	CAR; 19	HOM; 23										20th	2320	
1997	BACE Motorsports	33	Chevy	DAY; 34	CAR; 10	RCH; 18	ATL; 7	LVS; 15	DAR; 14	HCY; 3	TEX; 38	BRI; 7	NSV; 3	TAL; 5	NHA; 39	NZH; 11	CLT; 35	DOV; 15	SBO; 19	GLN; 32	**MLW**; 10	MYB; 12	GTY; 6	IRP; 4	MCH; 25	BRI; 27	DAR; 15	RCH; 9	DOV; 14	CLT; 27	CAL; 33	CAR; 19	HOM; 10						9th	3398	
1998	BACE Motorsports	33	Chevy	DAY; 20	CAR; 18	LVS; 19	NSV; 8	DAR; 34	BRI; 34	TEX; 13	HCY; 3	TAL; 27	NHA; 11	NZH; 1*	CLT; 18	DOV; 17	RCH; 15	PPR; 35	GLN; 7	MLW; 8	**MYB**; 6	CAL; 17	SBO; 1	IRP; 38	MCH; 32	BRI; 5	DAR; 26	RCH; 21	DOV; 15	CLT; 30	GTY; 18	CAR; 9	ATL; 27	HOM; 10					7th	3515	
1999	Cicci-Welliver Racing	36	Pontiac	DAY; 35	CAR; 10	LVS; 34	ATL; DNQ	DAR; 8	TEX; 21	NSV; 37	BRI; 9	TAL; 28	CAL; 6	NHA; 23	RCH; 33	NZH; 3	CLT; 38	DOV; 21	SBO; 5	GLN; 27	MLW; 31	MYB; 27	PPR; 2	GTY; 43	IRP; 7	MCH; DNQ	BRI; 25	DAR; 28	RCH; 14	DOV; 41	CLT; 26	CAR; 17	MEM; 9	PHO; 35	HOM; 15				14th	2989	
2000	Cicci-Welliver Racing	36	Chevy	DAY; 24	CAR; 39	LVS; 20	ATL; 40	DAR; 11	BRI; 28	TEX; 41	NSV; 11	TAL; 31	CAL; DNQ	RCH; 20	**NHA**; 1*	CLT; 27	DOV; 19	SBO; 12	MYB; 38	GLN; 6	MLW; 4	NZH; 19	PPR; 10	GTY; 21	IRP; 41	MCH; 16	BRI; 13	DAR; 37	RCH; 36	DOV; 11	CLT; 23	CAR	MEM; 5	PHO; 29	HOM; 10				18th	3009	
2001	Cicci-Welliver Racing	66	Chevy	DAY; 24	CAR; 30	LVS; 28	ATL; 31	DAR; 18	BRI; 2	TEX; 26	NSH; 18	TAL; 18	CAL; 11	RCH; 21	NHA; 25	NZH; 5	CLT; 27	DOV; 31																					25th	2403	
2001	Buckshot Racing	00	Chevy																KEN; 36	MLW; 31	GLN	CHI	GTY; 40	PPR; 10	IRP; 7	MCH; 9	BRI; 41	DAR	RCH	DOV	KAN								25th	2403	
2001	WP Motorsports	12	Chevy																													CLT; 27				HOM; DNQ			25th	2403	
2001	HighLine Performance Group	11	Chevy																														MEM; 6						25th	2403	
2001	Team Bristol Motorsports	54	Chevy																															PHO; 26	CAR				25th	2403	
2002	Biagi Brothers Racing	07	Pontiac	DAY	CAR	LVS	DAR	BRI	TEX	NSH	TAL; 3	CAL	RCH	NHA																									51st	654	
2002	NEMCO Motorsports	87	Chevy												NZH; 39	CLT	DOV	NSH	KEN	MLW	DAY	CHI	GTY	PPR	IRP	MCH													51st	654	
2002	Marsh Racing	31	Chevy																								BRI; 14	DAR	RCH; 31	DOV; 36									51st	654	
2002	Team Bristol Motorsports	54	Chevy																												KAN; 25								51st	654	
2002	Herzog-Jackson Motorsports	92	Chevy																													CLT; 12	MEM; 20	ATL; 26	CAR	PHO	HOM		51st	654	
2003	FitzBradshaw Racing	12	Chevy	DAY	CAR	LVS	DAR	BRI	TEX	TAL	NSH	CAL	RCH	GTY	NZH	CLT	DOV	NSH	KEN	MLW	DAY	CHI	NHA; 12	PPR; 13	IRP; 13	MCH; 25	BRI; 24	DAR; 19	RCH; 18	DOV; 17	KAN; 18	CLT; 25	MEM; 20	ATL; 24	PHO; 24	CAR; 24	HOM; 42		36th	1491	
2004	FitzBradshaw Racing	12	Chevy	DAY; 16	CAR; 18	LVS; 7	DAR; 16	BRI; 12	TEX; 15	NSH; 12	TAL; 37	CAL; 31	GTY; 9	RCH; 17	NZH; 15	CLT; 42	DOV; 9	NSH; 11	KEN; 34	MLW; 17	DAY; 10	CHI; 17	NHA; 2	PPR; 25	IRP; 34	MCH; 23	BRI; 16	CAL; 27	RCH; 35	DOV; 13	KAN; 38	CLT; 31	MEM; 23	ATL; 33	PHO; 18	DAR; 14	HOM; 21		16th	3480	
2005	FitzBradshaw Racing	12	Dodge	DAY; 24	CAL; 21	MXC; 21	LVS; 15	ATL; 38	NSH; 26	BRI; 25	TEX; 16	PHO; 41	TAL; 37	DAR; 19	RCH; 41	CLT; 29	DOV; 34	NSH; 21	KEN; 40	MLW; 27	DAY; 24	CHI; 32	NHA; 13	PPR; 18	GTY	IRP	GLN	MCH	BRI	CAL	RCH	DOV	KAN	CLT	MEM	TEX	PHO	HOM	32nd	1737	

==== Craftsman Truck Series ====
NASCAR Craftsman Truck Series results
Year	Team	No.	Make	1	2	3	4	5	6	7	8	9	10	11	12	13	14	15	16	17	18	19	20	21	22	23	24	25	NCTC	Pts	Ref
2002	Roush Racing	99	Ford	DAY; 27	DAR	MAR	GTY	PPR	DOV	TEX	MEM	MLW	KAN	KEN	NHA	MCH	IRP	NSH	RCH	TEX	SBO	LVS	CAL	PHO	HOM				86th	82	
2005	Glynn Motorsports	65	Dodge	DAY	CAL	ATL	MAR	GTY	MFD	CLT	DOV	TEX	MCH	MLW	KAN	KEN	MEM	IRP; 20	NSH; 19	BRI; 26	RCH	NHA	LVS; 10	MAR; 23	ATL; 20	TEX; DNQ	PHO; 13	HOM; DNQ	32nd	749	
2006	Key Motorsports	40	Chevy	DAY	CAL	ATL	MAR	GTY	CLT	MFD	DOV	TEX	MCH	MLW	KAN	KEN	MEM	IRP	NSH	BRI	NHA	LVS; 29	TAL	MAR	ATL	TEX	PHO	HOM	81st	76	

=== ARCA Bondo/Mar-Hyde Series ===
(key) (Bold – Pole position awarded by qualifying time. Italics – Pole position earned by points standings or practice time. * – Most laps led.)

ARCA Bondo/Mar-Hyde Series results
Year	Team	No.	Make	1	2	3	4	5	6	7	8	9	10	11	12	13	14	15	16	17	18	19	20	21	22	ABSC	Pts	Ref
1990	Rich Thiel Racing		Pontiac	DAY	ATL	KIL	TAL	FRS	POC	KIL	TOL	HAG	POC	TAL	MCH	ISF	TOL; 13	DSF	WIN	DEL	ATL					94th	-	
1991	RaDiUs Motorsports	55	Ford	DAY	ATL	KIL	TAL	TOL	FRS	POC	MCH	KIL	FRS	DEL	POC	TAL	HPT	MCH	ISF	TOL	DSF	TWS	ATL; 8			118th	-	
1992	RaDiUs Motorsports	55	Ford	DAY	FIF	TWS	TAL	TOL	KIL	POC; 3	MCH; 8	FRS	KIL	NSH	DEL	POC; 4	HPT	FRS	ISF	TOL	DSF	TWS	SLM	ATL; 2		47th	-	
1993	RaDiUs Motorsports	55	Ford	DAY; 34	FIF	TWS	TAL	KIL	CMS	FRS	TOL	POC	MCH	FRS	POC	KIL	ISF	DSF	TOL	SLM	WIN	ATL; 18				75th	-	
1994	RaDiUs Motorsports	55	Ford	DAY; 3	TAL	FIF	LVL	KIL	TOL	FRS	MCH	DMS	POC	POC	KIL	FRS	INF	I70	ISF	DSF	TOL	SLM	WIN	ATL; 31		85th	550	
1998	Team Rensi Motorsports	83	Chevy	DAY	ATL	SLM	CLT	MEM	MCH	POC	SBS	TOL	PPR	POC	KIL	FRS	ISF	ATL	DSF	SLM	TEX	WIN	CLT	TAL; 25	ATL	N/A	0	
