= 1995 NASCAR Busch Series =

American motorsport season

The 1995 NASCAR Busch Series was held February 18 and ended November 5. Johnny Benson of BACE Motorsports won the championship.

This was the first season to utilize V8 engines after having used V6 engines since the series began in 1982.

== Teams and drivers ==
=== Complete schedule ===
Team	Manufacturer	No.	Race driver	Crew chief	Rounds
Akins-Sutton Motorsports	Ford	38	Elton Sawyer	Danny Marshburn	Full
American Equipment Racing	Chevrolet	95	John Tanner (R)	Butch Enders	8
American Equipment Racing	Chevrolet	95	Ward Burton	Butch Enders	12
American Equipment Racing	Chevrolet	95	Ed Berrier	Butch Enders	3
American Equipment Racing	Chevrolet	95	Butch Leitzinger	Butch Enders	1
BACE Motorsports	Chevrolet	74	Johnny Benson	Steve Bird	Full
Beverley Racing	Chevrolet	25	Kirk Shelmerdine (R)	Billy Thurston	7
Beverley Racing	Chevrolet	25	Johnny Rumley	Billy Thurston	19
Bown Racing	Chevrolet	51	Jim Bown	Dick Bown	22
Bown Racing	Chevrolet	5	Jim Bown	Dick Bown	1
Dale Earnhardt, Inc.	Chevrolet	3	Jeff Green	Tony Eury Sr	Full
Doug Taylor Motorsports	Chevrolet	40	Patty Moise	Doug Taylor	Full
Group III Racing	Ford	18	L. W. Miller (R)	Mark Connolly	8
Group III Racing	Ford	18	Randy Porter	Mark Connolly	10
Group III Racing	Ford	18	Dennis Setzer	Mark Connolly	1
Group III Racing	Ford	18	Tom Peck	Mark Connolly	4
Group III Racing	Ford	18	Ed Berrier	Mark Connolly	1
Group III Racing	Ford	18	Chuck Bown	Mark Connolly	1
Hensley Motorsports	Pontiac	63	Curtis Markham (R)	Jeff Hensley	Full
Houston Racing	Ford	6	Tommy Houston	Scott Houston	Full
J&J Racing	Chevrolet 25; Oldsmobile1	99	Phil Parsons	David Ifft	Full
KEL Racing	Chevrolet	57	Jason Keller	Steve Addington	Full
Labonte Motorsports	Chevrolet	44	David Green	Charles Smith	Full
Laughlin Racing	Ford	35	Doug Heveron	Kenneth Campbell	25
Laughlin Racing	Ford	35	Jimmy Hensley	Kenneth Campbell	1
Lepage Racing	Chevrolet	71	Kevin Lepage	Danny Smith	Full
Mark Rypien Motorsports	Ford	23	Chad Little	Gary Cogswell	Full
Martin Motorsports	Chevrolet	92	Larry Pearson	Ryan Pemberton	Full
Moroso Racing	Ford	20	Bobby Hillin Jr.	Vic Kangas	8
Moroso Racing	Ford	20	Jimmy Spencer	Vic Kangas	13
Moroso Racing	Ford	20	Joe Bessey	Vic Kangas	2
Moroso Racing	Ford	20	Dennis Setzer	Vic Kangas	1
M.P.H. Racing	Chevrolet	08	Bobby Dotter	Lonnie Rush	25
M.P.H. Racing	Chevrolet	08	Dennis Setzer	Lonnie Rush	1
Parker Racing	Chevrolet	72	Tracy Leslie		24
Parker Racing	Chevrolet	72	Todd Bodine		2
Petty Enterprises	Pontiac	43	Rodney Combs	Bob Johnson	Full
RaDiUs Motorsports	Ford	55	Tim Fedewa	Bryan Smith	Full
Reiser Enterprises	Chevrolet	17	Robbie Reiser	Joe Shear Jr.	Full
Sadler Racing	Chevrolet	1	Hermie Sadler	Bobby King	Full
Shoemaker Racing	Chevrolet	64	Dirk Stephens	Allen Cretsinger	15
Shoemaker Racing	Chevrolet	64	Randy LaJoie	Allen Cretsinger	10
Shoemaker Racing	Chevrolet	64	Bobby Dotter	Allen Cretsinger	1
ST Motorsports	Chevrolet	47	Jeff Fuller (R)	Steve Plattenberger	Full
Team 34	Chevrolet	34	Mike McLaughlin	Clyde McLeod	Full

=== Limited schedule ===
Team	Manufacturer	No.	Race driver	Crew chief	Rounds
Alliance Racing	Ford	59	Dennis Setzer	Ricky Pearson	14
Bahari Racing	Pontiac	30	Michael Waltrip	Ronnie Silver	6
Barrett Racing	Chevrolet	91	Stanton Barrett		2
Bobby Jones Racing	Ford	50	Jeremy Mayfield		8
Bobby Jones Racing	Ford	50	Tommy Ellis		2
Bobby Jones Racing	Ford	50	Derrike Cope		3
Boley Racing	Ford	26	Steve Boley		1
Bradshaw Racing Assoc.	Chevrolet	83	Gary Green	Rick Tori	1
Buckshot Racing	Ford 11; Chevrolet 1	00	Buckshot Jones (R)		12
Clark Racing	Chevrolet	53	Greg Clark (R)		7
CPR Motorsports	Ford	36	Shawna Robinson	Allen Russell	4
CPR Motorsports	Ford	36	Andy Belmont		5
CPR Motorsports	Ford	36	Bill Venturini		3
CPR Motorsports	Ford	46	Andy Belmont		2
DAJ Racing	Ford	32	Dale Jarrett	John Ervin	12
Davison Motorsports	Chevrolet	97	Joe Bessey	Bob Hayden	5
Davison Motorsports	Chevrolet	97	Ed Berrier		2
Day Enterprises	Chevrolet	16	Darryl Sage		2
Day Enterprises	Chevrolet	16	Jerry Foyt		2
Day Enterprises	Chevrolet	16	Mark Day		1
Diamond Ridge Motorsports	Chevrolet	29	Steve Grissom	Tommy Morgan	15
Douglas Motorsports	Pontiac	70	Johnny Chapman		3
Douglas Motorsports	Pontiac	70	Patty Moise		1
Edwards Motorsports	Chevrolet	61	Danny Edwards Jr.		5
Emerald Performance Group	Chevrolet	88	Pete Orr		4
FILMAR Racing	Ford	8	Kenny Wallace	Gil Martin	15
Foxco Racing	Ford	39	Tim Bender	Bob Bender	4
Franks Racing	Chevrolet	4	Junior Franks		2
Fred Turner Racing	Chevrolet	2	Sterling Marlin		1
Group III Racing	Ford	81	Todd Bodine	Tim LaWarre	1
Group III Racing	Ford	81	Doug Taylor		1
Hank Parker Racing	Chevrolet	03	David Bonnett (R)		8
Henderson Motorsports	Ford	75	Rick Wilson	Chris Carrier	14
Henderson Motorsports	Chevrolet	5	Brad Teague		2
Ingram Racing	Chevrolet	11	Jamie Aube		1
Ingram Racing	Chevrolet	11	Pete Silva		1
J&L Racing	Chevrolet	68	Chris Diamond	Darryl Diamond	6
Ken Schrader Racing	Chevrolet	52	Ken Schrader	Tim Kohuth	9
Key Motorsports	Chevrolet	05	Steve Boley	Curtis Key	1
Key Motorsports	Ford	05	Chuck Bown	Curtis Key	3
Kilby Racing	Chevrolet	49	Scott Kilby		2
Labonte Motorsports	Chevrolet	11	Darrell Waltrip		1
Labonte Motorsports	Chevrolet	14	Terry Labonte	Bob Labonte	19
Langdon Racing	Ford	77	Victor Sifton		1
Laugeni Racing	Chevrolet	98	Brian Donley		3
Laugeni Racing	Chevrolet	98	Tracy Leslie		1
Lewis Motorsports	Chevrolet	80	Ashton Lewis Jr.		2
LJR Racing Enterprises	Ford	97	Russ Galindo		1
MacDonald Motorsports	Chevrolet	01	Randy MacDonald		2
Marc Madison Racing	Chevrolet	53	Marc Madison		2
Murphy Motorsports	Chevrolet	70	Dale Fischlein		5
NEMCO Motorsports	Chevrolet	87	Joe Nemechek	Mike Boerschinger	6
Owen Racing	Ford	90	Mike Wallace	Barry Owen	20
Owen Racing	Ford	9	Kevin Simmons		4
Phoenix Racing	Chevrolet	4	Jeff Purvis	Marc Reno	9
Porter Racing	Ford	48	Randy Porter		3
RaDiUs Motorsports	Ford	66	Glenn Allen Jr.		1
RaDiUs Motorsports	Ford	66	Johnny Chapman		2
Ray Motorsports	Chevrolet	2	Kevin Ray		2
Richard Childress Racing	Chevrolet	12	Mike Dillon	Dean Johnson	5
Ricky Craven Motorsports	Chevrolet	2	Ricky Craven	Scott Maxim	9
Ritch Racing	Chevrolet	2	Michael Ritch		1
Roush Racing	Ford	60	Mark Martin	Bobby Leslie	15
Roush Racing	Ford	9	Ted Musgrave		1
Team SABCO Fred Turner Racing	Pontiac	42	Bobby Hamilton	Clyde Mendenhall	5
Team SABCO Fred Turner Racing	Pontiac	42	Dennis Setzer	Clyde Mendenhall	3
Sacks Motorsports	Pontiac	33	Greg Sacks		5
Shepherd Racing	Ford	21	Morgan Shepherd	Dick Schlitz	8
Stegall Motorsports	Chevrolet	85	Shane Hall		3
Stricklin-Arquette Racing	Ford	37	Hut Stricklin		2
T&G Racing	Ford 7 Chevrolet 1	15	Jerry Nadeau		8
Tobias Racing	Ford	58	Toby Tobias Jr.		2
Virtue Racing	Ford	54	Rich Bickle	Fred Wanke	12
Ward Motorsports	Chevrolet	88	Marty Ward		2
Ward Motorsports	Chevrolet	97	Marty Ward		1
Ware Racing Enterprises	Chevrolet	98	Rick Ware		1
Whitaker Racing	Chevrolet	7	Stevie Reeves	Jim Harmon	20
Williams Racing	Ford	56	Ed Berrier		2
Williams Racing	Ford	56	Dale Williams (R)	Darrell Bryant	4
Williams Racing	Ford	58	Dale Williams (R)	Darrell Bryant	2
Zook Motorsports	Ford	82	Derrike Cope	Red Farmer	3

== Races ==
=== Goody's 300 ===
The Goody's 300 was held February 18 at Daytona International Speedway. Michael Waltrip won the pole.

Top ten results

1. 23–Chad Little
2. 30–Michael Waltrip
3. 14–Terry Labonte
4. 8–Kenny Wallace
5. 54–Rich Bickle
6. 51–Jim Bown
7. 3–Jeff Green
8. 60–Mark Martin
9. 4–Jeff Purvis
10. 74–Johnny Benson
- This was Little's first career Busch Series victory.

=== Goodwrench 200 ===
The Goodwrench 200 was held February 25 at North Carolina Speedway. David Green won the pole.

Top ten results

1. 23–Chad Little
2. 60–Mark Martin
3. 14–Terry Labonte
4. 74–Johnny Benson
5. 21–Morgan Shepherd
6. 99–Phil Parsons
7. 82–Derrike Cope
8. 90–Mike Wallace
9. 97–Joe Bessey
10. 3–Jeff Green

=== Hardee's 250 ===
The Hardee's 250 was held March 4 at Richmond International Raceway. Chad Little won the pole.

Top ten results

1. 8–Kenny Wallace
2. 14–Terry Labonte
3. 74–Johnny Benson
4. 34–Mike McLaughlin
5. 57–Jason Keller
6. 7–Stevie Reeves
7. 6–Tommy Houston
8. 08–Bobby Dotter
9. 99–Phil Parsons
10. 48–Randy Porter

=== Busch Light 300 ===
The Busch Light 300 was held March 11 at Atlanta Motor Speedway. Mark Martin won the pole.

Top ten results

1. 74–Johnny Benson
2. 52–Ken Schrader
3. 51–Jim Bown
4. 55–Tim Fedewa
5. 1–Hermie Sadler
6. 43–Rodney Combs
7. 92–Larry Pearson
8. 82–Derrike Cope
9. 75–Rick Wilson
10. 38–Elton Sawyer

=== Opryland USA 320 ===
The Opryland USA 320 was held March 17 at Nashville Speedway USA. Darrell Waltrip won the pole.

Top ten results

1. 44–David Green
2. 23–Chad Little
3. 14–Terry Labonte
4. 8–Kenny Wallace
5. 92–Larry Pearson
6. 74–Johnny Benson
7. 34–Mike McLaughlin
8. 11–Darrell Waltrip
9. 17–Robbie Reiser
10. 3–Jeff Green

=== Mark III Vans 200 ===
The Mark III Vans 200 was held March 25 at Darlington Raceway. Tim Fedewa won the pole.

Top ten results

1. 92–Larry Pearson
2. 74–Johnny Benson
3. 60–Mark Martin
4. 23–Chad Little
5. 99–Phil Parsons
6. 29–Steve Grissom
7. 87–Joe Nemechek
8. 20–Bobby Hillin Jr.
9. 71–Kevin Lepage
10. 57–Jason Keller

=== Goody's 250 ===
The Goody's 250 was held April 1 at Bristol Motor Speedway. David Green won the pole.

Top ten results

1. 29–Steve Grissom
2. 60–Mark Martin
3. 23–Chad Little
4. 8–Kenny Wallace
5. 14–Terry Labonte
6. 74–Johnny Benson
7. 5–Brad Teague
8. 90–Mike Wallace
9. 63–Curtis Markham
10. 57–Jason Keller

=== Sundrop 400 ===
The Sundrop 400 was held April 15 at Hickory Motor Speedway. David Green won the pole.

Top ten results

1. 74–Johnny Benson
2. 1–Hermie Sadler
3. 34–Mike McLaughlin
4. 57–Jason Keller
5. 08–Bobby Dotter
6. 59–Dennis Setzer
7. 47–Jeff Fuller
8. 63–Curtis Markham
9. 51–Jim Bown
10. 11–Pete Silva
- This was Benson's last career NASCAR Busch Series victory.

=== NE Chevy Dealers 250 ===
The NE Chevy Dealers 250 was held May 13 at New Hampshire International Speedway. Mike McLaughlin won the pole.

Top ten results

1. 23–Chad Little
2. 38–Elton Sawyer
3. 90–Mike Wallace
4. 34–Mike McLaughlin
5. 74–Johnny Benson
6. 59–Dennis Setzer
7. 25–Johnny Rumley
8. 72–Tracy Leslie
9. 76–Tom Bolles
10. 92–Larry Pearson

=== Meridian Advantage 200 ===
The Meridian Advantage 200 was held May 21 at Nazareth Speedway. David Green won the pole.

Top ten results

1. 55–Tim Fedewa
2. 35–Doug Heveron
3. 74–Johnny Benson
4. 3–Jeff Green
5. 44–David Green
6. 08–Bobby Dotter
7. 57–Jason Keller
8. 38–Elton Sawyer
9. 47–Jeff Fuller
10. 20–Joe Bessey
- This was Fedewa's first career Busch Series victory.

=== Red Dog 300 ===
The Red Dog 300 was held May 27 at Charlotte Motor Speedway. Rich Bickle won the pole.

Top ten results

1. 23–Chad Little
2. 3–Jeff Green
3. 72–Tracy Leslie
4. 60–Mark Martin
5. 52–Ken Schrader
6. 57–Jason Keller
7. 14–Terry Labonte
8. 54–Rich Bickle
9. 4–Jeff Purvis
10. 71–Kevin Lepage

=== GM Goodwrench/Delco 200 ===
The GM Goodwrench/Delco 200 was held June 3 at Dover International Speedway. Tracy Leslie won the pole.

Top ten results

1. 34–Mike McLaughlin
2. 90–Mike Wallace
3. 2–Ricky Craven
4. 57–Jason Keller
5. 32–Dale Jarrett
6. 25–Johnny Rumley
7. 99–Phil Parsons
8. 1–Hermie Sadler
9. 23–Chad Little
10. 20–Jimmy Spencer

=== Carolina Pride/Red Dog 250 ===
The Carolina Pride/Red Dog 250 was held June 10 at Myrtle Beach Speedway. Jeff Green won the pole.

Top ten results

1. 92–Larry Pearson
2. 57–Jason Keller
3. 59–Dennis Setzer
4. 3–Jeff Green
5. 08–Bobby Dotter
6. 43–Rodney Combs
7. 63–Curtis Markham
8. 34–Mike McLaughlin
9. 74–Johnny Benson
10. 38–Elton Sawyer
- This was Larry Pearson's final Busch Series victory.

=== Lysol 200 ===
The Lysol 200 was held June 25 at Watkins Glen International. Terry Labonte won the pole.

Top ten results

1. 14–Terry Labonte
2. 23–Chad Little
3. 2–Ricky Craven
4. 34–Mike McLaughlin
5. 3–Jeff Green
6. 29–Steve Grissom
7. 74–Johnny Benson
8. 63–Curtis Markham
9. 1–Hermie Sadler
10. 29–Phil Parsons

=== Sears Auto Center 250 ===
The Sears Auto Center 250 was held July 2 at The Milwaukee Mile. Dennis Setzer won the pole.

Top ten results

1. 32–Dale Jarrett
2. 92–Larry Pearson
3. 3–Jeff Green
4. 59–Dennis Setzer
5. 34–Mike McLaughlin
6. 57–Jason Keller
7. 63–Curtis Markham
8. 23–Chad Little
9. 90–Mike Wallace
10. 54–Rich Bickle

=== Humminbird Fishfinder 500K ===
The Humminbird Fishfinder 500K was held July 22 at Talladega Superspeedway. Jeff Purvis won the pole.

Top ten results

1. 23–Chad Little
2. 20–Jimmy Spencer
3. 8–Kenny Wallace
4. 87–Joe Nemechek
5. 74–Johnny Benson
6. 90–Mike Wallace
7. 40–Patty Moise
8. 75–Rick Wilson
9. 52–Ken Schrader
10. 38–Elton Sawyer

=== Ford Credit 300 ===
The Ford Credit 300 was held July 29 at South Boston Speedway. Curtis Markham won the pole.

Top ten results

1. 23–Chad Little
2. 34–Mike McLaughlin
3. 44–David Green
4. 92–Larry Pearson
5. 95–Ward Burton
6. 64–Bobby Dotter
7. 38–Elton Sawyer
8. 46–Elliott Sadler
9. 00–Buckshot Jones
10. 71–Kevin Lepage

=== Kroger 200 ===
The Kroger 200 was held August 4 at Indianapolis Raceway Park. Elton Sawyer won the pole.

Top ten results

1. 57–Jason Keller
2. 38–Elton Sawyer
3. 34–Mike McLaughlin
4. 72–Tracy Leslie
5. 6–Tommy Houston
6. 1–Hermie Sadler
7. 08–Bobby Dotter
8. 95–Ward Burton
9. 3–Jeff Green
10. 47–Jeff Fuller
- Chris Diamond spun around in turn two and knocked the lights at the exact place where Gary St. Amant did the previous day in the SuperTruck Series.

=== Detroit Gasket 200 ===
The Detroit Gasket 200 was held August 19 at Michigan International Speedway. Dale Jarrett won the pole.

Top ten results

1. 60–Mark Martin
2. 14–Terry Labonte
3. 64–Randy LaJoie
4. 2–Ricky Craven
5. 74–Johnny Benson
6. 99–Phil Parsons
7. 20–Jimmy Spencer
8. 2–Ward Burton
9. 52–Ken Schrader
10. 34–Mike McLaughlin
- Dale Jarrett had led the most laps in the race and won, but was disqualified for a rules violation, giving the win to Mark Martin.
- This race was Tommy Ellis' last career start.

=== Food City 250 ===
The Food City 250 was held August 25 at Bristol Motor Speedway. Stevie Reeves won the pole.

Top ten results

1. 29–Steve Grissom
2. 3–Jeff Green
3. 55–Tim Fedewa
4. 23–Chad Little
5. 14–Terry Labonte
6. 44–David Green
7. 6–Tommy Houston
8. 71–Kevin Lepage
9. 20–Jimmy Spencer
10. 47–Jeff Fuller

=== Gatorade 200 ===
The Gatorade 200 was held September 2 at Darlington Raceway. Larry Pearson won the pole.

Top ten results

1. 60–Mark Martin
2. 74–Johnny Benson
3. 95–Ward Burton
4. 99–Phil Parsons
5. 87–Joe Nemechek
6. 90–Mike Wallace
7. 57–Jason Keller
8. 38–Elton Sawyer
9. 3–Jeff Green
10. 34–Mike McLaughlin

=== Autolite 250 ===
The Autolite 250 was held September 8 at Richmond International Raceway. Randy LaJoie won the pole.

Top ten results

1. 32–Dale Jarrett
2. 60–Mark Martin
3. 74–Johnny Benson
4. 29–Steve Grissom
5. 14–Terry Labonte
6. 20–Jimmy Spencer
7. 44–David Green
8. 8–Kenny Wallace
9. 64–Randy LaJoie
10. 38–Elton Sawyer

=== MBNA 200 ===
The MBNA 200 was held September 16 at Dover International Speedway. Jason Keller won the pole.

Top ten results

1. 25–Johnny Rumley*
2. 1–Hermie Sadler
3. 99–Phil Parsons
4. 29–Steve Grissom
5. 90–Mike Wallace
6. 35–Doug Heveron
7. 34–Mike McLaughlin
8. 3–Jeff Green
9. 74–Johnny Benson
10. 43–Rodney Combs
- This was Rumley's final career victory.

=== All Pro Bumper to Bumper 300 ===
The All Pro Bumper to Bumper 300 was held October 7 at Charlotte Motor Speedway. Bobby Dotter won the pole.

Top ten results

1. 60–Mark Martin
2. 32–Dale Jarrett
3. 4–Jeff Purvis
4. 47–Jeff Fuller
5. 34–Mike McLaughlin
6. 21–Morgan Shepherd
7. 92–Larry Pearson
8. 14–Terry Labonte
9. 05–Chuck Bown
10. 8–Kenny Wallace

=== AC-Delco 200 ===
The AC-Delco 200 was held October 21 at North Carolina Speedway. Johnny Benson won the pole.

Top ten results

1. 72–Todd Bodine
2. 90–Mike Wallace
3. 74–Johnny Benson
4. 95–Ward Burton
5. 44–David Green
6. 29–Steve Grissom
7. 54–Rich Bickle
8. 60–Mark Martin
9. 64–Randy LaJoie
10. 71–Kevin Lepage

=== Jiffy Lube Miami 300 ===
The inaugural Jiffy Lube Miami 300 was held November 5 at the Miami-Dade Homestead Motorsports Complex. Joe Nemechek won the pole.

Top ten results

1. 32–Dale Jarrett
2. 55–Tim Fedewa
3. 57–Jason Keller
4. 30–Michael Waltrip
5. 60–Mark Martin
6. 99–Phil Parsons
7. 87–Joe Nemechek
8. 47–Jeff Fuller
9. 74–Johnny Benson
10. 63–Curtis Markham
- Final Busch Grand National Series win for Dale Jarrett.

== Full Drivers' Championship ==
(key) Bold – Pole position awarded by time. Italics – Pole position set by owner's points. * – Most laps led.

Pos	Driver	DAY	CAR	RCH	ATL	NSV	DAR	BRI	HCY	NHA	NAZ	CLT	DOV	MYB	GLN	MLW	TAL	SBO	IRP	MCH	BRI	DAR	RCH	DOV	CLT	CAR	HOM	Pts
1	Johnny Benson	10	4	3	1	6	2	6	1	5	3	30	14	9	7	33	5	16	13*	5	12*	2	3	9	26	3	9	3688
2	Chad Little	1	1*	32	29*	2	4	3	23*	1	19	1	9	32	2	8	1	1*	20	21	4	40	16	13	34	35	26	3284
3	Mike McLaughlin	37	13	4	31	7	16	30	3	**4**	31	20	1*	8	4	5	32	2	3	10	21	10	17	7	5	13	24	3273
4	Jason Keller	18	29	5	11	21	10	10	4	26	7	6	4	2*	35	6	33	20	1	20	16	7	22	**15**	21	20	3	3211
5	Jeff Green	7	10	36	22	10	27	25	29	14*	4	2	15	**4**	5	3	12	22	9	14	2	9	15	8	11	27	35	3182
6	Larry Pearson	25	23	34	7	5	1	20	17	10	28	23	13	1	18	2	17	4	36	22	29	**17**	25	16	7	11	16	3029
7	Tim Fedewa	28	34	17	4	12	**23**	11	15	15	1*	19	22	11	20	15	28	12	11	25	3	25	26	19	13	12	2	3022
8	Phil Parsons	30	6	9	14	11	5	23	14	24	23	22	7	25	10	29	35	24	35	6	13	4	14	3	17	25	6	2985
9	Elton Sawyer	39	32	15	10	30	38	18	26	2	8	27	12	10	22	14	10	7	**2**	13	26	8	10	17	20	14	12	2952
10	Jeff Fuller	11	30	16	27	20	22	14	7	22	9	15	28	28	15	22	14	11	10	28	10	18	23	21	4	38	8	2845
11	Rodney Combs	16	11	20	6	16	17	19	19	12	21	41	11	6	14	23	39	13	33	17	15	20	36	10	15	17	22	2782
12	David Green	14	**33**	12	40	1*	31	**36**	**18**	11	**5**	38	19	34	32	17	19	3	28	24	6	32	7	14	19	5	28	2714
13	Hermie Sadler	13	40	38	5	14	29	15	2	23	25	39	8	20	9	27	21	15	6	40	19	31	19	2	36	16	17	2694
14	Bobby Dotter	15	39	8	23	17	25	17	5	28	6	33	32	5	12	12	24	6	7	23	11	12	DNQ	33	**32**	32	33	2636
15	Curtis Markham **(R)**	31	19	11	25	31	34	9	8	34	18	16	18	7	8	7	25	**26**	34	30	28	15	20	22	37	34	10	2584
16	Tracy Leslie	21	12	28	32	18	12	34	27	8	27	3	**24**	13	19	19	23	21	4	38	18	39	13	20	25	36	43	2530
17	Terry Labonte	3	3	2	16	3	32	5		21		7	36		**1***		15			2	5	35	5		8	26	13	2490
18	Kevin Lepage	DNQ	18	19			9	DNQ	20	17	17	10	27	21	11	25	22	10	24	19	8	16	33	40	16	10	21	2355
19	Doug Heveron	27	22	18	26	25	13	31	11	32	2	42	29	29	33	21	26	17	26		36	30	32	6	18	18	19	2326
20	Mike Wallace	20	8	13	37		33	8		3		31	2			9	6		25	37	17	6	11	5	DNQ	2	15	2295
21	Tommy Houston	35	28	7	DNQ	22	18	26	DNQ	42	11	21	38	12	30	13	16	14	5	36	7	37	DNQ	34	30	41	42	2069
22	Mark Martin	8	2	33	**39**		3	2*				4	41				30			1		1*	2*		1*	8*	5	2037
23	Dennis Setzer	24	36	14	20	19	19	24	6	6	35	26	20	3	Wth	**4**		31	23		25		31		22		30	2036
24	Jim Bown	6	21	30	3	29	15	16	9	35	36	17	23	23	34	31	38	25			33	28	18		23	33	DNQ	2026
25	Patty Moise	42	14	23	24	28	30	22	25	DNQ	24	18	42	22	38	37	7	27	22	27	31	13	DNQ	24	DNQ	23	DNQ	1901
26	Steve Grissom	19					6*	1				13	30		6		29			39	1	11	4	4	27	6	38	1816
27	Kenny Wallace	4		1*	18	4		4				40				11	3			26	30	14	8		10	42	16*	1814
28	Johnny Rumley								12	7	34	24	6	30	DNQ	24	11	28	27	29	35	23	DNQ	1	12	21	40	1708
29	Stevie Reeves	43	20	6	33	34	35	33				DNQ	21			26	41		12	31	**14**	38	34	35	DNQ	19	20	1454
30	Robbie Reiser	29	38	DNQ		9	42	13	28	DNQ	30	DNQ	17	16		36	18				27	24	37	23	33	DNQ	23	1444
31	Ward Burton									13		11	31				36	5	8	8		3		12	38	4	31	1389
32	Dale Jarrett	38			34			12		31		25	5			1*				**42***			1		2	28	1	1376
33	Rich Bickle	5			13					33		**8**	16			10	DNQ			15				37	41	7	11	1220
34	Jimmy Spencer									40		DNQ	10		28		2	23		7	9	33	6	36	35	39		1177
35	Rick Wilson	17			9	13	14	27		43		32					8			41	32	22	21	38	DNQ	DNQ		1173
36	Dirk Stephens		26	35	35	23	28	32	13	DNQ	32	28	35	18	40	18												1030
37	Randy LaJoie																34		15	3	22	27	**9**	18	14	9	DNQ	1029
38	Jeff Purvis	9			12	35						9			36		**31**			12	DNQ				3		14	999
39	Randy Porter			10		33			22	36	42	DNQ	25	14		16	42	32	16	33								994
40	Ken Schrader	40			2							5	26				9			9					29	15	34	984
41	Buckshot Jones		DNQ	DNQ										DNQ		34		9	29	16	23	41	12	11	DNQ	DNQ	37	833
42	Joe Nemechek	12			38		7										4					5					**7***	783
43	Ricky Craven						26			DNQ			3		3					4		34		28*	39		DNQ	761
44	Joe Bessey	23	9	29		37				25	10			24					14		24					31		733
45	Morgan Shepherd		5	37	15		36					36								11					6	DNQ		715
46	Bobby Hillin Jr.	26	41	21	28	24	8	28	DNQ																			616
47	Ed Berrier						11	35			33		34	27		38					34				DNQ	24		596
48	Michael Waltrip	**2**			36	38						35					20								DNQ		4	595
49	Kirk Shelmerdine **(R)**	41	24	24	19	32	24	29																				562
50	Jeremy Mayfield		15		42		40			19	37	12			37		DNQ											535
51	L. W. Miller **(R)**	32	42	31	21	27	41	DNQ	24																DNQ	40		530
52	Derrike Cope	22	7		8																	42		39	DNQ		41	471
53	Jerry Nadeau			DNQ					21	29				19		20			31							DNQ	DNQ	455
54	Mike Dillon								16					17				18							42	29		449
55	David Bonnett **(R)**	DNQ	17									43	37				27			18					40	DNQ		432
56	Greg Clark **(R)**			22						DNQ		DNQ			27					32		26			DNQ	DNQ		331
57	Bobby Hamilton	36				15		21				DNQ					37											325
58	Todd Bodine									37															DNQ	1	27	314
59	Chuck Bown																						38		9	30	39	306
60	John Tanner **(R)**		31	26		39	21	DNQ	DNQ																			301
61	Tim Bender **(R)**	33			30		20					37																292
62	Danny Edwards Jr.								DNQ					15				19					35			DNQ		282
63	Johnny Chapman								QL					26				29								37	32	280
64	Tom Peck																					19		31	24		DNQ	267
65	Brad Teague							7													20							249
66	Marty Ward															35			19						28			243
67	Elliott Sadler																	8					24					233
68	Andy Belmont						39	DNQ									DNQ				DNQ	21		26	DNQ	DNQ	DNQ	231
69	Shawna Robinson	DNQ	16	DNQ	17																							227
70	Greg Sacks											34					DNQ						30		44		36	220
71	Kevin Simmons		37													30								23		DNQ		213
72	Dale Fischlein	DNQ										DNQ					13							29			DNQ	200
73	Mark Green																		18				28			DNQ	DNQ	188
74	Chris Diamond					40			DNQ					DNQ				30	32						DNQ		DNQ	183
75	Shane Hall					26																			DNQ	22	DNQ	182
76	Dale Williams **(R)**		27	DNQ			37	DNQ		DNQ	39																	180
77	Tommy Ellis																		17	34								173
78	Jerry Foyt		25	27																								170
79	Steve Boley			25												28												167
80	Pete Orr																					29			31	DNQ	DNQ	146
81	Scott Kilby								30					31														143
82	Darrell Waltrip					**8**																						142
83	Pete Silva								10												DNQ							134
84	Ashton Lewis														13			DNQ										124
85	Ted Musgrave											14																121
86	Butch Leitzinger														16													115
87	Toby Tobias Jr.												40											32				110
88	Brian Donley												43											30		QL		107
89	Kevin Ray																		21						DNQ	DNQ		100
90	Randy MacDonald														23											DNQ		94
91	Troy Beebe	DNQ															DNQ					36				43		89
92	Phillip Groggins														25													88
93	Mike Garvey																										25	88
94	Steve Park																							27				82
95	Michael Ritch																						27					82
96	Eddie Johnson																						29			DNQ		76
97	Glenn Allen Jr.											29													DNQ		DNQ	76
98	Ron Thiel Jr.									DNQ	13																29	76
99	Marc Madison		DNQ											DNQ					30									73
100	Victor Sifton														31													70
101	Russ Galindo															32												67
102	Darryl Sage	DNQ												33														64
103	Junior Franks		DNQ										33													DNQ		64
104	Stanton Barrett		35									DNQ																58
105	Jimmy Hensley	DNQ																		35								58
106	Sterling Marlin					36																						55
107	Gary Green										DNQ		39															46
108	Doug Taylor															39												46
109	Hut Stricklin	DNQ															40											43
110	Rick Ware				41																				DNQ			40
111	Larry Carroll																							41				40
112	Loy Allen Jr.																								43			34
113	Tom Bolles									9	14				24													
114	Dale Shaw									18	26				39													
115	Martin Truex Sr.									39	20				29													
116	Bobby Dragon									DNQ	12				17													
117	Kelly Moore									DNQ	16				41													
118	Jamie Aube	34								30																		
119	Jerry Marquis									38	29																	
120	Mike Stefanik									41	41																	
121	Rob Wilson		DNQ							DNQ	15																	
122	Brian Ross									16																		
123	Reggie Ruggiero									20																		
124	Rick Bye														21													
125	Dave Dion									DNQ	22																	
126	Jeff Spraker														26													
127	Stub Fadden									27																		
128	Robbie Crouch									DNQ	38																	
129	Jeff Barry									DNQ	40																	
130	Steve Hoddick	44																										
131	Glenn Sullivan	45																										
132	Mike Swaim Jr.	DNQ																										
133	Wayne Severance		DNQ																									
134	Joey McCarthy			DNQ				DNQ	DNQ		DNQ										DNQ							
135	John Preston			DNQ						DNQ	DNQ																	
136	Roy Payne					DNQ						DNQ																
137	Mark Day							DNQ													DNQ							
138	Mike Brawley								DNQ																			
139	Andy Houston								DNQ																			
140	Bill Venturini								DNQ	DNQ		DNQ																
141	Mike Cope										DNQ																	
142	John Linville													DNQ														
143	Jimmy Mann													DNQ				DNQ										
144	Kerry Micks																	DNQ										
145	Skip Pannell																	DNQ										
146	Dave Mader III																								DNQ			
147	Lester Lesneski																								DNQ	DNQ	DNQ	
148	Donnie Mergard																									DNQ		
149	Ron Hornaday Jr.																									DNQ		
150	Kenny Kagle																									DNQ	DNQ	
151	Kyle Petty																										DNQ	
152	Ernie Irvan																										DNQ	
153	Tony Stewart																										DNQ	
154	Billy Bigley Jr.																										DNQ	
155	Jabe Jones																										DNQ	
156	Bobby Labonte	QL																									QL	
157	Doug Reid III																									QL		
Pos	Driver	DAY	CAR	RCH	ATL	NSV	DAR	BRI	HCY	NHA	NAZ	CLT	DOV	MYB	GLN	MLW	TAL	SBO	IRP	MCH	BRI	DAR	RCH	DOV	CLT	CAR	HOM	Pts

== Rookie of the Year ==
Jeff Fuller, driving for the first-year ST Motorsports was named the 1995 Busch Series Rookie of the Year, finishing in the top-ten six times. His closest runner-up was Curtis Markham, who finished 15th in the final standings. Buckshot Jones and David Bonnett were the only two contenders that season, both of whom ran limited schedules that season.

== See also ==
- 1994–95 NASCAR SuperTruck Series exhibition races
- 1995 NASCAR Winston Cup Series
- 1995 NASCAR SuperTruck Series
- 1995 NASCAR Winston West Series
