= Frank Cicci Racing =

US stock car racing team

Cicci Motorsports
- Owner(s): Frank Cicci, Mark Daniel
- Series: Xfinity Series
- Opened: 1986
- Closed: 2007

Career
- Debut: Budweiser At The Glen (Watkins Glen); Xfinity Series: 1985 Sandhills 200 (Rockingham)
- Races competed: Total: 502; Xfinity Series: 497
- Drivers' Championships: Global Crossing @ The Glen (Watkins Glen) Xfinity Series: 2007 Pepsi 300 (Nashville)
- Race victories: Total: 19; Xfinity Series: 19
- Pole positions: Total: 12; Xfinity Series: 11

Cicci Racing was an American professional stock car racing team that competed in the NASCAR Xfinity Series. The team is owned by Frank Cicci of Elmira, New York and was last driven by Jay Sauter.

== Beginnings ==
FCR first began racing as a short track team in Upstate New York. They won the Late Model division championship in 1985 at Shangri-La Speedway (later Tioga Motorsports Park before closing after 2005) That year, they made their NASCAR Busch Series debut at North Carolina Speedway, as the No. 67. Jimmy Spencer qualified 30th and finished 19th. They hired Spencer to race in NASCAR's National Modified Tour after that, and subsequently won the championship in that series in 1986 and 1987. During the 1987 season, Cicci and Spencer ran two more races in the Busch Series with Quick Stop Beverage sponsoring. They decided to run Busch full-time in 1988, the team being named Team 34 Racing. Despite not winning a race, Spencer had 13 top-ten finishes, and finished seventh in points that season. They began 1989 without major sponsorship, but Spencer was able to pick up his first career victory at Hickory Motor Speedway, then won two more races that season at Rougemount and Myrtle Beach. Suddenly, Cicci released Spencer to have Randy LaJoie drive the 34 for the rest of the season, who posted two top-ten finishes. Spencer returned to run a limited schedule in a second Cicci car, the Lowes Foods No. 87 car, and had two top-ten finishes as well. He left for the Winston Cup Series at the end of the season.

== Early 90s ==
In 1990, FCR hired Clifford Allison to drive the Gwaltney Meats Buick. Allison struggled, however, and was released after the seventh race of the season. Jack Sprague took over for the balance of the season, and had a sixth-place finish at Orange County.

Still searching for competitiveness, Cicci teamed up with Jeffrey and Scott Welliver for 1991 and hired Todd Bodine to drive. Bodine rewarded them with a win at the Budweiser 200 and a seventh-place finish in points. The next season, armed with sponsor Hungry Jack, Bodine won three times and finished third in points. After switching to Chevrolets for 1993, Bodine won three more races but struggled with consistency, and finished ninth in points. He left for Butch Mock Motorsports at the end of the season. He was replaced by Mike McLaughlin, who had eight top-ten finishes in the Fiddle Faddle-sponsored car.

== Prime years ==
In 1995, French's Mustard became primary sponsor, and McLaughlin picked up his first career win at Dover International Speedway, and finished third in points. After a winless 1996, McLaughlin chalked up two more wins in 1997, and was named the Series' most popular driver. During the 1997 season, the team expanded to a multi-car operation, fielding the No. 36 Stanley Tools Pontiac Grand Prix for Bodine. He won one race and finished runner-up in the championship chase. Goulds Pumps was the team's new sponsor in 1998, and together they won two more races and finished third in points. Bodine had left for Team Tabasco at the end of the season, and rookie driver Matt Hutter took his place. Despite posting one top-ten finish, Hutter was replaced mid-season by David Green, who put together seven top-five finishes. A third car appeared for Cicci-Welliver in 1998 as well, the No. 30 Slim Jim Chevy driven by Mike Cope. Cope struggled with consistency as well, and would be replaced by Bodine for the balance of the season.

The team changed its name to Cicci-Welliver Racing before the 1999 season. In 1999, Tim Fedewa took over the No. 36, and had nine top-ten finishes and a 14th-place finish in points. Bodine continued driving the newly renumbered 66 Phillips Chevy and had ten top-fives. McLaughlin meanwhile decided he needed a change of scenery, and announced he was leaving the team for Innovative Motorsports, to the shock of the NASCAR community. David Green returned to take his place with AFG Glass as sponsor. He had eleven top-tens and a ninth in points. Fedewa picked up a win at New Hampshire, but failed to qualify twice and finished 18th in points. Bodine picked up one more victory and had a fourth-place finish in points.

== Struggles and rebirth ==
In 2001, Bodine left for Haas-Carter Motorsports, and Fedewa took his place in the 66. Consequently, Stanley was replaced by GNC, and Hank Parker Jr. took over the driving duties for the No. 36. Green stayed in the No. 34 and had six top-tens, but was not happy with the results and left. Parker picked up his first career win and finished 15th in points. Fedewa struggled with his new ride however, and would be released midway through the season. Geoff Bodine took over for the rest of the season, his best finish being a fourth at Richmond.

In 2002, the Wellivers pulled out of the team after a long association. Cicci sold the 36 and 66 teams to Wayne Jesel. Spencer returned to the team as a partner, with the United States Air Force came aboard to sponsor the No. 34, which was to be driven by rookie Stuart Kirby on a part-time schedule. Kirby ran eight races, but did not finish higher than 17th, and he was replaced by Steve Grissom, who didn't fare any better than a 22nd-place run at Richmond. The next season, former National Football League quarterback Jim Kelly came on board as a partner to try to attract sponsors. They could only get LesCare Kitchens to run that season, on a part-time basis. McLaughlin returned after a prior deal had fallen through, and had one top-ten finish, but LesCare did not live up to their sponsorship obligations, causing Spencer to dissolve the partnership.

The team shut down after that, but returned in 2005 with Dollar General sponsoring the car, driven by Randy LaJoie. LaJoie had three top-ten finishes, but was replaced by Todd Bodine on occasion, and finished 19th in points. For 2006, Champ Car World Series driver Paul Tracy took the wheel for five races with SportClips and American Crew. Other drivers that drove the car included Bodine, Scott Lynch, Carlos Pardo, Kertus Davis, Mike Bliss, Jason Keller, Jeff Fuller and Kim Crosby.

For Frank Cicci Racing's 20th year in the Busch Series the team was set to run the full 2007 season with new driver Brian Conz, coming over from the ARCA RE/MAX Series, with Scottish Rite as the sponsor. After Steve Grissom drove at Daytona, it was reported that Cicci has placed Conz and his sponsor on notice for failing to pay its financial obligations. Jay Sauter was to drive the car for most of the 2007 season, but the team suspended operations in April. They attempted to run the Zippo 200 but could not come up with funds to do so.

== Motorsports results ==
=== Winston Cup ===
==== Car No. 34 results ====
Year	Driver	No.	Make	1	2	3	4	5	6	7	8	9	10	11	12	13	14	15	16	17	18	19	20	21	22	23	24	25	26	27	28	29	30	31	32	33	34	Owners	Pts
1992	Todd Bodine	34	Ford	DAY	CAR	RCH	ATL	DAR	BRI	NWS	MAR	TAL	CLT	DOV	SON	POC	MCH	DAY	POC	TAL	GLN; 37	MCH	BRI	DAR	RCH	DOV	MAR	NWS	CLT	CAR	PHO	ATL							
1994	Mike McLaughlin	34	Chevy	DAY	CAR	RCH	ATL	DAR	BRI	NWS	MAR	TAL	SON	CLT	DOV	POC	MCH	DAY	NHA; 22	POC	TAL	IND	GLN; 27	MCH	BRI	DAR	RCH	DOV	MAR	NWS	CLT	CAR	PHO	ATL					
1996	Mike McLaughlin	34	Chevy	DAY	CAR	RCH	ATL	DAR	BRI	NWS	MAR	TAL	SON	CLT	DOV	POC	MCH	DAY	NHA	POC	TAL	IND	GLN; DNQ	MCH	BRI	DAR	RCH	DOV	MAR	NWS	CLT	CAR	PHO	ATL					
1997	Todd Bodine	34	Chevy	DAY	CAR	RCH	ATL	DAR	TEX	BRI	MAR	SON	TAL	CLT	DOV	POC	MCH	CAL	DAY	NHA	POC	IND	GLN; 35	MCH	BRI	DAR	RCH	NHA	DOV	MAR	CLT	TAL	CAR	PHO	ATL			59th	58
2000	Todd Bodine	34	Chevy	DAY	CAR	LVS	ATL	DAR	BRI	TEX	MAR	TAL	CAL	RCH	CLT	DOV	MCH	POC	SON	DAY	NHA	POC	IND	GLN; 42	MCH	BRI	DAR	RCH	NHA	DOV	MAR	CLT	TAL	CAR	PHO	HOM	ATL	63rd	34

=== Busch Series ===
==== Car No. 34 results ====
Year	Drivers	No.	Make	1	2	3	4	5	6	7	8	9	10	11	12	13	14	15	16	17	18	19	20	21	22	23	24	25	26	27	28	29	30	31	32	33	34	35	Owners	Pts
1985	Jimmy Spencer	67	Pontiac	DAY	CAR	HCY	BRI	MAR	DAR	SBO	LGY	DOV	CLT	SBO	HCY	ROU	IRP	SBO	LGY	HCY	MLW	BRI	DAR	RCH	NWS	ROU	CLT	HCY	CAR; 19	MAR										
1987	Jimmy Spencer	4	Olds	DAY	HCY	MAR	DAR	BRI	LGY	SBO	CLT; 36	DOV																												
1987	Jimmy Spencer	24	Olds										IRP; DNQ	ROU	JFC	OXF; 41	SBO	HCY	RAL	LGY	ROU	BRI	JFC	DAR	RCH	DOV	MAR													
1987	Jimmy Spencer	24	Buick																									CLT; DNQ	CAR	MAR										
1988	Jimmy Spencer	34	Buick	DAY; 29	HCY; 16	CAR; 11	MAR; 8	DAR; 20	BRI; 5	LNG; 8	NZH; 8	SBO; 12	NSV; 3	CLT; 16	DOV; 28	ROU; 3	LAN; 8	LVL; 5	MYB; 18	OXF; 11	SBO; 17	HCY; 22	LNG; 9	IRP; 17	ROU; 16	BRI; 6	DAR; 6	RCH; 16	DOV; 6	MAR; 5	CLT; 29	CAR; 13	MAR; 16							
1989	Jimmy Spencer	34	Buick	DAY; 34	CAR; 8	MAR; 6	HCY; 1*	DAR; 17	BRI; 9	NZH; 9	SBO; 22	LAN; 15	NSV; 9	CLT; 11	DOV; 26	ROU; 1*	LVL; 17	VOL; 26	MYB; 1*	SBO; 17																				
1989	Randy LaJoie	34	Buick																		HCY; 2	DUB; 15	IRP; 12	ROU; 25	BRI; 11	DAR; 18	RCH; 11	DOV; 20	MAR; 27	CLT; 14	CAR; 8	MAR; 23								
1990	Clifford Allison	34	Buick	DAY; 13	RCH; DNQ	CAR; 29	MAR; 25	HCY; DNQ	DAR; 17	BRI; 25	LAN	SBO																												
1990	Jack Sprague	34	Buick										NZH; 24	HCY; 18	CLT; 30	DOV; 20	ROU; 6	VOL; 21	MYB; 15	OXF; 12	NHA; 21	SBO; 11	DUB; 17	IRP; 25	ROU; 15	BRI; 22	DAR; 25	RCH	DOV; 36	MAR; 20	CLT; 35	NHA; 46	CAR; 19	MAR; 17						
1991	Todd Bodine	34	Buick	DAY; 27	RCH; 15	CAR; 4	MAR; 12	VOL; 8	HCY; 8	DAR; 5	BRI; 26	LAN; 8	SBO; 10	NZH; 22	CLT; 39	DOV; 1	ROU; 22	HCY; 18		GLN; 5	OXF; 3	NHA; 22	SBO; 6	DUB; 18	IRP; 12	ROU; 21	BRI; 22	DAR; 3	RCH; 33	DOV; 26	CLT; 8		CAR; 10	MAR; 4						
1991	Todd Bodine	34	Olds																MYB; 6																					
1991	Glenn Sullivan	34	Chevy																													NHA; 45								
1992	Todd Bodine	34	Chevy	DAY; 24		RCH; 12					HCY; 27	LAN; 6		NZH; 1				MYB; 15			NHA; 6	TAL; 3	IRP; 8		MCH; 1*	NHA; 3		DAR; 10	RCH; 7	DOV; 13	CLT; 37			HCY; 3						
1992	Todd Bodine	34	Buick		CAR; 23		ATL; 20	MAR; 25	DAR; 5	BRI; 20			DUB; 11		CLT; 7	DOV; 8	ROU; 6		GLN; 2	VOL; 5				ROU; 4			BRI; 1					MAR; 21	CAR; 3							
1993	Todd Bodine	34	Chevy	DAY; 41	CAR; 33	RCH; 9	DAR; 5	BRI; 2	HCY; 5	ROU; 22	MAR; 18	NZH; 11	CLT; 31	DOV; 1*	MYB; 6	GLN; 5	MLW; 11	TAL; 38	IRP; 19	MCH; 7	NHA; 40	BRI; 1*	DAR; 27	RCH; 18	DOV; 1	ROU; 18	CLT; 5	MAR; 11	CAR; 4	HCY; 10	ATL; 34									
1994	Mike McLaughlin	34	Chevy	DAY; 29	CAR; 22	RCH; 11	ATL; 39	MAR; 21	DAR; 21	HCY; 12	BRI; DNQ	ROU; 16	NHA; 10	NZH; 5	CLT; 9	DOV; 18	MYB; 31	GLN; 19	MLW; 6	SBO; 15	TAL; 7	HCY; 16	IRP; 3	MCH; 4	BRI; DNQ	DAR; 6	RCH; 11	DOV; 28	CLT; 27	MAR; 11	CAR; 35									
1995	Mike McLaughlin	34	Chevy	DAY; 37	CAR; 13	RCH; 4	ATL; 31	NSV; 7	DAR; 16	BRI; 30	HCY; 3	NHA; 4	NZH; 31	CLT; 20	DOV; 1*	MYB; 8	GLN; 4	MLW; 5	TAL; 32	SBO; 2	IRP; 3	MCH; 10	BRI; 21	DAR; 10	RCH; 17	DOV; 7	CLT; 5	CAR; 13	HOM; 24											
1996	Mike McLaughlin	34	Chevy	DAY; 31	CAR; 2	RCH; 38	ATL; 11	NSV; 30	DAR; 41*	BRI; 27	HCY; 25	NZH; 29	CLT; 35	DOV; 32	SBO; 2	MYB; 6	GLN; 3	MLW; 2	NHA; 9	TAL; 25	IRP; 2	MCH; 13	BRI; 38	DAR; 38	RCH; 11	DOV; 6	CLT; 5	CAR; 4	HOM; 27											
1997	Mike McLaughlin	34	Chevy	DAY; 33	CAR; 8	RCH; 27	ATL; 17	LVS; 24	DAR; 33	HCY; 10	TEX; 5*	BRI; 2	NSV; 13	TAL; 35	NHA; 1	NZH; 8	CLT; 33	DOV; 23	SBO; 8	GLN; 1	MLW; 13	MYB; 2	GTY; 5	IRP; 37	MCH; 13	BRI; 16	DAR; 2	RCH; 32	DOV; 10	CLT; 13	CAL; 9	CAR; 7	HOM; 22						4th	3614
1998	Mike McLaughlin	34	Chevy	DAY; 18	CAR; 5	LVS; 27	NSV; 1	DAR; 8	BRI; 6	TEX; 11	HCY; 21	TAL; 3	NHA; 7	NZH; 3	CLT; 7	DOV; 5	RCH; 34	PPR; 20	GLN; 2	MLW; 6	MYB; 3	CAL; 24	SBO; 3	IRP; 18	MCH; 15	BRI; 17	DAR; 3*	RCH; 28	DOV; 4	CLT; 1	GTY; 12	CAR; 41	ATL; 29	HOM; 18					3rd	4045
1999	Mike McLaughlin	34	Chevy	DAY; 15	CAR; 6	LVS; 19	ATL; 12	DAR; 16	TEX; 4	NSV; 7	BRI; 27	TAL; 21	CAL; 41	NHA; 40	RCH; 14	NZH; 28	CLT; 27	DOV; 28	SBO; 15	GLN; 3	MLW; 11	MYB; 12	PPR; 15	GTY; 9	IRP; 17	MCH; 24	BRI; 39	DAR; 38	RCH; 43	DOV; 9	CLT; 3	CAR; 16	MEM; 7	PHO; 16	HOM; 20				9th	3478
2000	David Green	34	Chevy	DAY; 11	CAR; 36	LVS; 19	ATL; 6	DAR; 7	BRI; 6	TEX; 3	NSV; 8	TAL; 40	CAL; 40	RCH; 18	NHA; 8	CLT; 13	DOV; 24	SBO; 22	MYB; 25	GLN; 44	MLW; 30	NZH; 18	PPR; 2	GTY; 26	IRP; 9	MCH; 33	BRI; 10	DAR; 24	RCH; 10	DOV; 37	CLT; 37	CAR; 27	MEM; 41	PHO; 9	HOM; 17				12th	3316
2001	David Green	34	Chevy	DAY; 23	CAR; 28	LVS; 40	ATL; 18	DAR; 31	BRI; 15	TEX; 6	NSH; 24	TAL; 32	CAL; 13	RCH; 13	NHA; 23	NZH; 16	CLT; 9	DOV; 8	KEN; 23	MLW; 15	GLN; 35	CHI; 15	GTY; 7	PPR; 6	IRP; 18	MCH; 37	BRI; 15	DAR; 22	RCH; 12	DOV; 15	KAN; 13	CLT; 21	MEM; 33	PHO; 15	CAR; 6	HOM; 11			15th	3554
2002	Mike Laughlin Jr.	34	Chevy	DAY	CAR	LVS; DNQ	DAR	BRI																															41st	1084
2002	Stuart Kirby	34	Chevy						TEX; 43	NSH	TAL	CAL; 33	RCH	NHA	NZH	CLT; 41	DOV	NSH; 25	KEN; 29	MLW; 17	DAY	CHI	GTY; 36	PPR; 26	IRP														41st	1084
2002	Steve Grissom	34	Chevy																							MCH; 30	BRI; 41	DAR	RCH; 22	DOV; 29	KAN; 37	CLT; 23	MEM	ATL	CAR	PHO	HOM; 31		41st	1084
2003	Mike McLaughlin	34	Chevy	DAY	CAR	LVS	DAR	BRI	TEX	TAL; 39	NSH	CAL	RCH; 13	GTY	NZH	CLT; 30	DOV	NSH	KEN	MLW	DAY; 9	CHI; 30	NHA; 26	PPR	IRP	MCH	BRI	DAR	RCH	DOV	KAN	CLT	MEM	ATL	PHO	CAR	HOM		54th	539
2005	Randy LaJoie	34	Chevy	DAY; 19	CAL; 31	MXC; 32	LVS; 8	ATL; 15	NSH; 28	BRI; 27	TEX; 26	PHO; 35	TAL; 6	DAR; 26	RCH; 26	CLT; 28	DOV; 17	NSH; 24	KEN; 21	MLW; 7	DAY; 30	CHI; 31	NHA; 39	PPR; 16	GTY; 14	IRP; 17	GLN; 21	MCH; 41		CAL; 21	RCH; 15	DOV; 42			MEM; 25		PHO; 25		24th	3109
2005	Todd Bodine	34	Chevy																										BRI; 21				KAN; 33	CLT; 32		TEX; 32		HOM; 40	24th	3109
2006	Paul Tracy	34	Chevy	DAY; 24			LVS; 36						TAL; 35								DAY; 28									CAL; 42	RCH	DOV	KAN	CLT	MEM	TEX	PHO	HOM	45th	1191
2006	Todd Bodine	34	Chevy		CAL; 37												DOV; 36																						45th	1191
2006	Carlos Pardo	34	Chevy			MXC; 42																																	45th	1191
2006	Scott Lynch	34	Chevy					ATL; 43																															45th	1191
2006	Mike Bliss	34	Chevy						BRI; 36	TEX; 12	NSH; 26	PHO; 38																											45th	1191
2006	Jason Keller	34	Chevy											RCH; DNQ																									45th	1191
2006	Kertus Davis	34	Chevy												DAR; 42	CLT; DNQ																							45th	1191
2006	Jeff Fuller	34	Chevy															NSH; 27	KEN; 41																				45th	1191
2006	Kim Crosby	34	Chevy																	MLW; 40																			45th	1191
2006	Kevin Lepage	34	Chevy																			CHI; 43	NHA	MAR	GTY	IRP													45th	1191
2006	Brian Simo	34	Chevy																								GLN; 22	MCH	BRI										45th	1191
2007	Steve Grissom	34	Chevy	DAY; 25																																			51st	592
2007	Jay Sauter	34	Chevy		CAL; 28		LVS; 21	ATL; DNQ	BRI; 15	NSH; 28	TEX	PHO	TAL	RCH	DAR	CLT	DOV	NSH	KEN	MLW	NHA	DAY	CHI	GTY	IRP	CGV	GLN	MCH	BRI	CAL	RCH	DOV	KAN	CLT	MEM	TEX	PHO	HOM	51st	592
2007	Brian Simo	34	Chevy			MXC; 22																																	51st	592

==== Car No. 36 results ====
Year	Drivers	No.	Make	1	2	3	4	5	6	7	8	9	10	11	12	13	14	15	16	17	18	19	20	21	22	23	24	25	26	27	28	29	30	31	32	33	Owners	Pts
1997	Todd Bodine	36	Pontiac	DAY; 2	CAR; 7	RCH; 7	ATL; 6	LVS; 3	DAR; 10	HCY; 5	TEX; 4	BRI; 30	NSV; 5	TAL; 8	NHA; 6*	NZH; 2	CLT; 7	DOV; 7	SBO; 9	GLN; 2	MLW; 11	MYB; 4	GTY; 24	IRP; 25	MCH; 6	BRI; 8	DAR; 8	RCH; 25	DOV; 15	CLT; 20	CAL; 1	CAR; 34	HOM; 7				2nd	4115
1998	Matt Hutter	36	Pontiac	DAY; 21	CAR; 19	LVS; 29	NSV; 39	DAR; 25	BRI; 18	TEX; 38	HCY; 24	TAL; 9	NHA; 29	NZH; 31	CLT; DNQ	DOV; 30	RCH; 41	PPR; 37																			16th	3190
1998	David Green	36	Pontiac																GLN; 4	MLW; 4	MYB; 2	CAL; 5	SBO; 4	IRP; 5	MCH; 23	BRI; 10	DAR; 11	RCH; 11	DOV; 40	CLT; 21	GTY; 19	CAR; 21	ATL; 19	HOM; 5			16th	3190
1999	Tim Fedewa	36	Pontiac	DAY; 35	CAR; 10	LVS; 34	ATL; DNQ	DAR; 8	TEX; 21	NSV; 37	BRI; 9	TAL; 28	CAL; 6	NHA; 23	RCH; 33	NZH; 3	CLT; 38	DOV; 21	SBO; 5	GLN; 27	MLW; 31	MYB; 27	PPR; 2	GTY; 43	IRP; 7	MCH; DNQ	BRI; 25	DAR; 28	RCH; 14	DOV; 41	CLT; 26	CAR; 17	MEM; 9	PHO; 35	HOM; 15		14th	3033
2000	Tim Fedewa	36	Chevy	DAY; 24	CAR; 39	LVS; 20	ATL; 40	DAR; 11	BRI; 28	TEX; 41	NSV; 11	TAL; 31	CAL; DNQ	RCH; 20	NHA; 1*	CLT; 27	DOV; 19	SBO; 12	MYB; 38	GLN; 6	MLW; 4	NZH; 19	PPR; 10	GTY; 21	IRP; 41	MCH; 16	BRI; 13	DAR; 37	RCH; 36	DOV; 11	CLT; 23		MEM; 5	PHO; 29	HOM; 10		15th	3158
2000	Geoff Bodine	36	Chevy																													CAR; 14					15th	3158
2001	Hank Parker Jr.	36	Chevy	DAY; 14	CAR; 17	LVS; 22	ATL; 38	DAR; 25	BRI; 21	TEX; 29	NSH; 25	TAL; 41	CAL; 1	RCH; 11	NHA; 18	NZH; 39	CLT; 15	DOV; 30	KEN; 11	MLW; 14	GLN; 32	CHI; 35	GTY; 26	PPR; 22	IRP; 25	MCH; 28	BRI; 34	DAR; 17	RCH; 28	DOV; 8	KAN; 2	CLT; 7	MEM; 32	PHO; 8	CAR; 8	HOM; 20	18th	3341

==== Car No. 66 results ====
Year	Drivers	No.	Make	1	2	3	4	5	6	7	8	9	10	11	12	13	14	15	16	17	18	19	20	21	22	23	24	25	26	27	28	29	30	31	32	33	Owners	Pts
1998	Mike Cope	30	Chevy	DAY; 42	CAR; 34	LVS; 40	NSV; 40	DAR; 40	BRI; 15	TEX; 24	HCY; 7	TAL; 18	NHA; 38	NZH; 30	CLT; DNQ	DOV; 33	RCH; 33	PPR; 9	GLN; 35	MLW; 26	MYB; 31																19th	2985
1998	Todd Bodine	30	Chevy																			CAL; 33	SBO; 5	IRP; 15	MCH; 12	BRI; 4	DAR; 5	RCH; 5	DOV; 5	CLT; 8	GTY; 9	CAR; 12	ATL; 15	HOM; 38			19th	2985
1999	Todd Bodine	66	Chevy	DAY; 32	CAR; 9	LVS; 40	ATL; 5	DAR; 10	TEX; 37	NSV; 5	BRI; 5	TAL; 31	CAL; 25	NHA; 9	RCH; 4	NZH; 15	CLT; 9	DOV; 3	SBO; 12	GLN; 9	MLW; 8	MYB; 6	PPR; 3	GTY; 10	IRP; 2	MCH; 13	BRI; 5	DAR; 10	RCH; 38	DOV; 32	CLT; 9	CAR; 5	MEM; 4*	PHO; 9	HOM; 32		4th	4029
2000	Todd Bodine	66	Chevy	DAY; 34	CAR; 8	LVS; 4	ATL; 4	DAR; 5	BRI; 3	TEX; 4	NSV; 9	TAL; 25	CAL; 5	RCH; 7	NHA; 4	CLT; 5	DOV; 13	SBO; 36	MYB; 6	GLN; 4	MLW; 31	NZH; 40	PPR; 21	GTY; 3	IRP; 7	MCH; 1*	BRI; 30	DAR; 16	RCH; 4	DOV; 4	CLT; 42	CAR; 4	MEM; 20	PHO; 12	HOM; 32		4th	4075
2001	Tim Fedewa	66	Chevy	DAY; 24	CAR; 30	LVS; 28	ATL; 31	DAR; 18	BRI; 2	TEX; 26	NSH; 18	TAL; 18	CAL; 11	RCH; 21	NHA; 25	NZH; 5	CLT; 27	DOV; 31																			23rd	3191
2001	Geoff Bodine	66	Chevy																KEN; 41	MLW; 17	GLN; 20	CHI; 23	GTY; 19	PPR; 18	IRP; 8	MCH; 40	BRI; 14	DAR; 34	RCH; 4	DOV; 22	KAN; 26	CLT; 33	MEM; 35	PHO; 30	CAR; 18		23rd	3191
2001	Casey Mears	66	Chevy																																	HOM; 28	23rd	3191

==== Car No. 84 results ====
Year	Drivers	No.	Make	1	2	3	4	5	6	7	8	9	10	11	12	13	14	15	16	17	18	19	20	21	22	23	24	25	26	27	28	29	30	31	32	33	34	35	Owners	Pts
1991	Todd Bodine	84	Buick	DAY	RCH	CAR	MAR	VOL	HCY	DAR	BRI	LAN	SBO	NZH	CLT	DOV	ROU	HCY	MYB	GLN	OXF	NHA	SBO	DUB	IRP	ROU	BRI	DAR	RCH	DOV	CLT	NHA; 18	CAR	MAR						
2005	Randy LaJoie	84	Chevy	DAY	CAL	MXC	LVS	ATL	NSH	BRI	TEX	PHO	TAL	DAR	RCH	CLT	DOV	NSH	KEN	MLW	DAY	CHI	NHA	PPR	GTY	IRP	GLN	MCH	BRI; 17	CAL	RCH	DOV	KAN	CLT	MEM	TEX	PHO	HOM	75th	112
