= Mike McLaughlin (racing driver) =

American racing driver (born 1956)

- Born: Michael McLaughlin; October 6, 1956 (age 70) Waterloo, New York
- Retired: 2005

Previous series
- 1977-1993 Wins: Modified racing 32

Championship titles
- 1988 Winston Modified Tour National Champion

Awards
- 1997 Busch Series Most Popular Driver; 1992, 1993 Busch North Series Most Popular Driver; 1985 Winston Modified Tour Most Popular Driver; 2013 Northeast Dirt Modified Hall of Fame. 2015 Eastern Motorsports Press Association Hall Of Fame.

NASCAR Cup Series career
- 2 races run over 1 year
- Best finish: 55th (1994)
- First race: 1994 Slick 50 300 Loudon)
- Last race: 1994 The Bud At The Glen (Watkins Glen)
| Wins | Top tens | Poles |
|---|---|---|
| 0 | 0 | 0 |

NASCAR O'Reilly Auto Parts Series career
- 314 races run over 17 years
- Best finish: 3rd (1995, 1998)
- First race: 1984 Mello Yello 300 (Charlotte)
- Last race: 2004 Ford 300 (Homestead)
- First win: 1995 GM Goodwrench/Delco 200 (Dover)
- Last win: 2001 Subway 300 (Talladega)
| Wins | Top tens | Poles |
|---|---|---|
| 6 | 110 | 5 |

NASCAR FedEx Freight Truck Series career
- 2 races run over 2 years
- Best finish: 91st (1996, 1997)
- First race: 1996 Cummins 200 (IRP)
- Last race: 1997 Cummins 200 (IRP)
| Wins | Top tens | Poles |
|---|---|---|
| 0 | 2 | 0 |
- Statistics up to date as of April 4, 2014.

Michael McLaughlin (born October 6, 1956) is an American former professional stock car racing driver. Nicknamed "Magic Shoes", McLaughlin was a perennial fan favorite, winning the Most Popular Driver award in 1997. He also scored several wins and top-five points finishes in the points standings in the NASCAR Busch Series.

== Early career ==
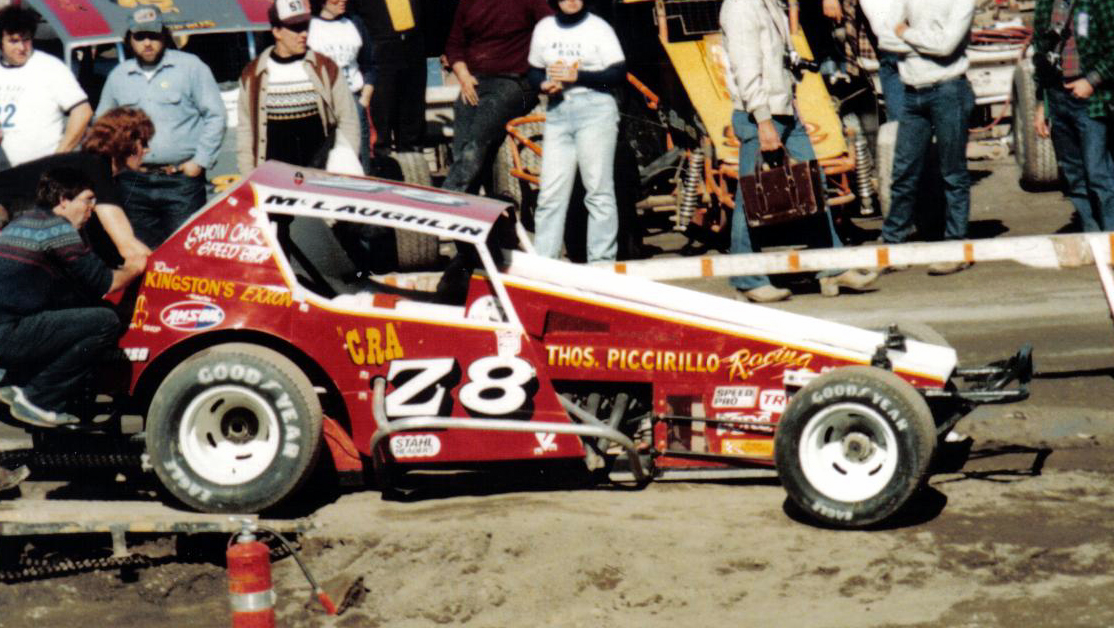
Dirt Modified in 1979 or 1980

McLaughlin grew up in New York State and began his professional career at a later stage than most other drivers, competing in his first race at the age of 20 in a dirt modified he built. He then ran regularly at his home track, Maple Grove Speedway, before moving up into the DIRT Modified series.

McLaughlin lived a few blocks from Maple Grove Speedway and built his first car in the garage at home. According to his mother, he drove the car to the track on his first night of racing.

== Move to NASCAR ==
In 1984, McLaughlin made his Busch Series debut at the Mello Yello 300 at Charlotte Motor Speedway, driving the No. 73 Pontiac home to a 14th place finish. He ran one more race that season, the October Charlotte race. Unfortunately, mechanical problems ended his day early. He raced twice more the next season, posting an 11th place run.

McLaughlin then advanced into the NASCAR Modified ranks for Sherwood Racing, owned by Bill Corazzo and run by Clyde McLeod. His crew included Corazzo's nephews, Paul Corazzo Jr., who would go onto his own racing career in both open wheeled formula cars and Sprint car winning championships in both many times, Greg Zipadelli, who would later win Sprint Cup titles as crew chief, and Greg's younger brother Scott Zipadelli, who is also now a top level NASCAR crew chief. McLaughlin won the 1988 championship in the Winston Modified Tour, now known as the Whelen Modified Tour. He has 16 career wins in the modified series.

McLaughlin also drove for Harry and Mike Greci in the Busch North Series, finishing third in points in 1993. McLaughlin became the first driver ever to win both ends of the Modified/Busch North doubleheader at New Hampshire Motor Speedway.

== NASCAR Busch Series career ==
In 1990, McLaughlin returned to the Busch Series, driving the No. 51 Coors Extra Gold Oldsmobile in six races. Despite two wrecks, McLaughlin had two top-five finishes and caught the eye of many in the sport. He ran eight races the following season, but was unable to duplicate his success. After part-time runs in 1992 and 1993, McLaughlin finally ran his first full-time schedule in the Busch Series in 1994, driving the No. 34 Fiddle Faddle Chevrolet for Cicci-Welliver Racing. Despite not making two races, McLaughlin posted three top-fives and finished 13th in points. He also ran two Winston Cup races for Cicci-Welliver that year, finishing 22nd and 27th at New Hampshire and Watkins Glen, respectively.

In 1995, McLaughlin got his first taste of Victory Lane, winning the GM Goodwrench/Delco 200 at Dover, and collected thirteen additional top-tens on his way to a third place points run. After a winless 1996, McLaughlin won twice in 1997 (including at his hometrack at Watkins Glen) and was named the series' Most Popular Driver. 1998 saw him add Goulds Pumps as his primary sponsor, and he won two more races, and matched his career-best finish of third in points.

After going winless in 1999, McLaughlin shockingly announced he would depart from Cicci-Welliver at the season's end, citing a need for a change. He and Goulds left for the No. 48 Chevy fielded by Innovative Motorsports in 2000. Unfortunately, the season was a struggle and McLaughlin could not get the cars up to speed. Despite two fifth place finishes, McLaughlin jumped ship just weeks before the start of the 2001 season to the unsponsored No. 20 owned by Joe Gibbs Racing. McLaughlin shocked the NASCAR world by winning the NASCAR Subway 300 at Talladega, albeit controversially. Despite the win, the team could not continue to run unsponsored, and McLaughlin moved over to the MBNA No. 18 for the remainder of the season. He finished seventh in points.

In 2001, McLaughlin was Tony Stewart's back-up driver for the Coca-Cola 600. Stewart was running the Indianapolis 500 the same day and McLaughlin was to have started the race if Stewart did not arrive on time. Stewart eventually arrived in Charlotte just minutes before the command to start engines and finished third.

== Struggles and retirement from driving ==
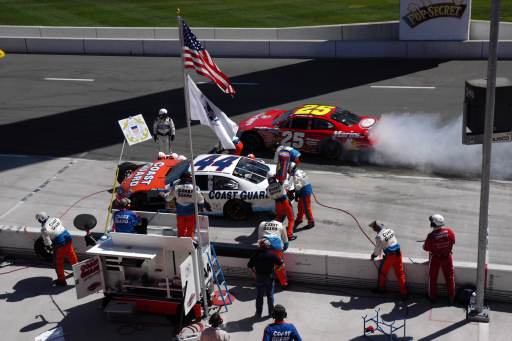
McLaughlin smokes his tires while leaving the pits in his No. 25 car during the 2004 California race.

In 2002, McLaughlin went winless once again, but was able to muster a fourth-place finish in points. However, Gibbs wanted to move his son Coy into the No. 18, and McLaughlin was forced to find a new job. In October 2002, McLaughlin announced he would run with a new team, Angela's Motorsports in the 2003 season. The team showed up at that season's Speedweeks, and their Ford Taurus was the fastest in testing. After that, problems began arising, and weeks before the season started, Angela's Motorsports closed its doors. It turned out that the team's owners had been behind in paying their bills, and their debtors took over the operation and shut everything down. McLaughlin appeared to be out of a job, but after word leaked out, fans began donating money to allow McLaughlin to run the Daytona race, and with sponsorship from XM Radio and with Darrell Waltrip's DWStore.com, McLaughlin drove the No. 39 Jay Robinson Racing Ford at the season-opening event, qualifying fourth but finishing 29th after a wreck in the closing laps. The financial windfall could not get McLaughlin a full-time ride, although he returned to Cicci Racing to run seven races, posting one top-ten finish. McLaughlin went unemployed in 2004 until the end of the season, when he replaced Bobby Hamilton Jr. at Team Rensi Motorsports after Hamilton left to join Nextel Cup team PPI Motorsports, posting a second-place run at the Stacker 200 Presented by YJ Stinger.

McLaughlin became a test driver and development driver coach for Joe Gibbs Racing, and opened his own racing fabrication business. As of 2009, McLaughlin is also building bobsleds for the Bo-Dyn Bobsled Project, supplier of sleds to the US Olympic team.

== Personal life ==
McLaughlin's son Max currently races in the Super DIRTcar Series. Max formerly competed for Hattori Racing Enterprises in the ARCA Menards Series East, winning a race in 2019 at Watkins Glen International, as well as one race in the NASCAR Xfinity Series at the same track in 2023, and one race in the NASCAR Camping World Truck Series at Eldora Speedway in 2018.

== Motorsports career results ==
=== NASCAR ===
(key) (Bold – Pole position awarded by qualifying time. Italics – Pole position earned by points standings or practice time. * – Most laps led.)

==== Winston Cup Series ====
NASCAR Winston Cup Series results
| Year | Team | No. | Make | 1 | 2 | 3 | 4 | 5 | 6 | 7 | 8 | 9 | 10 | 11 | 12 | 13 | 14 | 15 | 16 | 17 | 18 | 19 | 20 | 21 | 22 | 23 | 24 | 25 | 26 | 27 | 28 | 29 | 30 | 31 | NWCC | Pts | Ref |
|---|---|---|---|---|---|---|---|---|---|---|---|---|---|---|---|---|---|---|---|---|---|---|---|---|---|---|---|---|---|---|---|---|---|---|---|---|---|
| 1994 | Team 34 | 34 | Chevy | DAY | CAR | RCH | ATL | DAR | BRI | NWS | MAR | TAL | SON | CLT | DOV | POC | MCH | DAY | NHA; 22 | POC | TAL | IND | GLN; 27 | MCH | BRI | DAR | RCH | DOV | MAR | NWS | CLT | CAR | PHO | ATL | 55th | 179 | |
| 1996 | Team 34 | 34 | Chevy | DAY | CAR | RCH | ATL | DAR | BRI | NWS | MAR | TAL | SON | CLT | DOV | POC | MCH | DAY | NHA | POC | TAL | IND | GLN; DNQ | MCH | BRI | DAR | RCH | DOV | MAR | NWS | CLT | CAR | PHO | ATL | NA | - | |

==== Busch Series ====
NASCAR Busch Series results
| Year | Team | No. | Make | 1 | 2 | 3 | 4 | 5 | 6 | 7 | 8 | 9 | 10 | 11 | 12 | 13 | 14 | 15 | 16 | 17 | 18 | 19 | 20 | 21 | 22 | 23 | 24 | 25 | 26 | 27 | 28 | 29 | 30 | 31 | 32 | 33 | 34 | NBSC | Pts | Ref |
|---|---|---|---|---|---|---|---|---|---|---|---|---|---|---|---|---|---|---|---|---|---|---|---|---|---|---|---|---|---|---|---|---|---|---|---|---|---|---|---|---|
| 1984 | Boehler's Racing | 73 | Pontiac | DAY | RCH | CAR | HCY | MAR | DAR | ROU | NSV | LGY | MLW | DOV | CLT; 14 | SBO | HCY | ROU | SBO | ROU | HCY | IRP | LGY | SBO | BRI | DAR | RCH | NWS | CLT; 36 | HCY | CAR | MAR | | | | | | 67th | 176 | |
| 1985 | Boehler's Racing | 73 | Pontiac | DAY; 33 | CAR | HCY | BRI | MAR | DAR | SBO | LGY | DOV | | | | | | | | | | | | | | | | | | | | | | | | | | 62nd | 194 | |
| 1985 | Boehler's Racing | 03 | Pontiac | | | | | | | | | | CLT; 11 | SBO | HCY | ROU | IRP | SBO | LGY | HCY | MLW | BRI | DAR | RCH | NWS | ROU | CLT | HCY | CAR | MAR | | | | | | | | 62nd | 194 | |
| 1990 | H&H Motorsports | 51 | Olds | DAY; 39 | RCH | CAR | MAR | HCY | DAR | BRI | LAN | SBO | NZH | HCY | CLT | DOV; DNQ | ROU | VOL | MYB | OXF; DNQ | NHA; 6 | SBO | DUB | IRP | ROU | BRI | DAR | RCH; 29 | DOV | MAR | CLT; 17 | NHA; 3 | CAR | MAR; 4 | | | | 47th | 633 | |
| 1991 | H&H Motorsports | 51 | Olds | DAY; 37 | RCH | CAR | MAR | VOL | HCY | DAR | BRI | LAN | SBO | NZH | CLT; 41 | | | | | GLN; 19 | OXF; 39 | NHA; 14 | SBO | DUB | IRP | ROU | BRI | DAR | RCH | DOV | CLT; 32 | NHA; 12 | CAR | MAR | | | | 45th | 620 | |
| 1991 | Shoemaker Racing | 64 | Pontiac | | | | | | | | | | | | | DOV; 34 | ROU | HCY | MYB | | | | | | | | | | | | | | | | | | | 45th | 620 | |
| 1992 | H&H Motorsports | 51 | Olds | DAY | CAR | RCH | ATL | MAR | DAR | BRI | HCY | LAN | DUB | NZH; 30 | CLT | DOV | ROU | MYB | GLN; 13 | VOL | NHA; 30 | TAL | IRP | ROU | MCH | NHA; 29 | BRI | DAR | RCH | DOV | CLT; 14 | MAR | CAR | HCY; 27 | | | | 49th | 549 | |
| 1993 | H&H Motorsports | 51 | Olds | DAY | CAR | RCH | DAR | BRI | HCY | ROU | MAR | NZH; 9 | CLT | DOV | MYB | GLN; 12 | MLW | TAL | IRP | MCH | | | | | | | | | | | | | | | | | | NC^{2} | 0 | |
| 1993 | H&H Motorsports | 51 | Chevy | | | | | | | | | | | | | | | | | | NHA; 22 | BRI | DAR | RCH | DOV | ROU | CLT | MAR | CAR | HCY | ATL | | | | | | | NC^{2} | 0 | |
| 1994 | Team 34 | 34 | Chevy | DAY; 29 | CAR; 22 | RCH; 11 | ATL; 39 | MAR; 21 | DAR; 21 | HCY; 12 | BRI; DNQ | ROU; 16 | NHA; 10 | NZH; 5 | CLT; 9 | DOV; 18 | MYB; 31 | GLN; 19 | MLW; 6 | SBO; 15 | TAL; 7 | HCY; 16 | IRP; 3 | MCH; 4 | BRI; DNQ | DAR; 6 | RCH; 11 | DOV; 28 | CLT; 27 | MAR; 11 | CAR; 35 | | | | | | | 13th | 2986 | |
| 1995 | Team 34 | 34 | Chevy | DAY; 37 | CAR; 13 | RCH; 4 | ATL; 31 | NSV; 7 | DAR; 16 | BRI; 30 | HCY; 3 | **NHA**; 4 | NZH; 31 | CLT; 20 | DOV; 1* | MYB; 8 | GLN; 4 | MLW; 5 | TAL; 32 | SBO; 2 | IRP; 3 | MCH; 10 | BRI; 21 | DAR; 10 | RCH; 17 | DOV; 7 | CLT; 5 | CAR; 13 | HOM; 24 | | | | | | | | | 3rd | 3273 | |
| 1996 | Team 34 | 34 | Chevy | DAY; 31 | CAR; 2 | RCH; 38 | ATL; 11 | NSV; 30 | DAR; 41* | BRI; 27 | HCY; 25 | NZH; 29 | CLT; 35 | DOV; 32 | SBO; 2 | MYB; 6 | GLN; 3 | MLW; 2 | NHA; 9 | TAL; 25 | IRP; 2 | MCH; 13 | BRI; 38 | DAR; 38 | RCH; 11 | DOV; 6 | CLT; 5 | CAR; 4 | HOM; 27 | | | | | | | | | 10th | 2853 | |
| 1997 | Team 34 | 34 | Chevy | DAY; 33 | CAR; 8 | RCH; 27 | ATL; 17 | LVS; 24 | DAR; 33 | HCY; 10 | TEX; 5* | BRI; 2 | **NSV**; 13 | TAL; 35 | NHA; 1 | NZH; 8 | CLT; 33 | DOV; 23 | SBO; 8 | GLN; 1 | MLW; 13 | MYB; 2 | GTY; 5 | IRP; 37 | MCH; 13 | BRI; 16 | DAR; 2 | RCH; 32 | DOV; 10 | CLT; 13 | CAL; 9 | CAR; 7 | **HOM**; 22 | | | | | 4th | 3614 | |
| 1998 | Team 34 | 34 | Chevy | **DAY**; 18 | CAR; 5 | LVS; 27 | NSV; 1 | DAR; 8 | BRI; 6 | TEX; 11 | HCY; 21 | TAL; 3 | NHA; 7 | NZH; 3 | CLT; 7 | DOV; 5 | RCH; 34 | PPR; 20 | GLN; 2 | MLW; 6 | MYB; 3 | CAL; 24 | SBO; 3 | IRP; 18 | MCH; 15 | BRI; 17 | **DAR**; 3* | RCH; 28 | DOV; 4 | CLT; 1 | GTY; 12 | CAR; 41 | ATL; 29 | HOM; 18 | | | | 3rd | 4045 | |
| 1999 | Cicci-Welliver Racing | 34 | Chevy | DAY; 15 | CAR; 6 | LVS; 19 | ATL; 12 | DAR; 16 | TEX; 4 | NSV; 7 | BRI; 27 | TAL; 21 | CAL; 41 | NHA; 40 | RCH; 14 | NZH; 28 | CLT; 27 | DOV; 28 | SBO; 15 | GLN; 3 | MLW; 11 | MYB; 12 | PPR; 15 | GTY; 9 | IRP; 17 | MCH; 24 | BRI; 39 | DAR; 38 | RCH; 43 | DOV; 9 | CLT; 3 | CAR; 16 | MEM; 7 | PHO; 16 | HOM; 20 | | | 9th | 3478 | |
| 2000 | Innovative Motorsports | 48 | Chevy | DAY; 26 | CAR; 15 | LVS; 43 | ATL; 21 | DAR; 33 | BRI; 42 | TEX; 40 | NSV; 2 | TAL; 14 | CAL; 41 | RCH; 25 | NHA; 33 | CLT; 32 | DOV; 10 | SBO; 24 | MYB; 30 | GLN; 5 | MLW; 28 | NZH; 34 | PPR; 8 | GTY; 36 | IRP; 34 | MCH; 5 | BRI; 28 | DAR | RCH; 30 | DOV; 34 | CLT; 39 | CAR; 16 | MEM; 24 | PHO; 15 | HOM; 31 | | | 24th | 2690 | |
| 2001 | Joe Gibbs Racing | 20 | Pontiac | DAY; 6 | CAR; 14 | LVS; 9 | ATL; 11 | DAR; 5 | BRI; 13 | TEX; 37 | NSH; 9 | TAL; 1 | CAL; 10 | RCH; 22 | NHA; 10 | NZH; 17 | CLT; 11 | DOV; 21 | KEN; 25 | MLW; 18 | | | | | | | | | | | | | | | | | | 7th | 3962 | |
| 2001 | Joe Gibbs Racing | 18 | Pontiac | | | | | | | | | | | | | | | | | | GLN; 17 | CHI; 25 | GTY; 12 | PPR; 14 | IRP; 23 | MCH; 5 | BRI; 16 | DAR; 3 | RCH; 32 | DOV; 31 | KAN; 10 | CLT; 19 | MEM; 10 | PHO; 31 | CAR; 3 | HOM; 12 | | 7th | 3962 | |
| 2002 | Joe Gibbs Racing | 18 | Pontiac | DAY; 38 | CAR; 5 | LVS; 12 | DAR; 6 | BRI; 2 | TEX; 18 | NSH; 20 | | CAL; 6 | RCH; 14 | NHA; 5 | NZH; 9 | CLT; 4 | DOV; 8 | NSH; 33 | KEN; 39 | MLW; 8 | DAY; 7 | CHI; 27 | GTY; 7 | PPR; 7 | IRP; 14 | MCH; 17 | BRI; 4 | DAR; 8 | RCH; 19 | DOV; 2 | KAN; 31 | CLT; 8 | MEM; 16 | ATL; 3 | CAR; 13 | PHO; 19 | HOM; 20 | 4th | 4253 | |
| 2002 | Joe Gibbs Racing | 18 | Chevy | | | | | | | | TAL; 24 | | | | | | | | | | | | | | | | | | | | | | | | | | | 4th | 4253 | |
| 2003 | Jay Robinson Racing | 39 | Ford | DAY; 29 | CAR | | | | | | | | | | | | | | | | | | | | | | | | | | | | | | | | | 61st | 615 | |
| 2003 | Santerre Racing | 01 | Ford | | | LVS; DNQ | DAR | BRI | TEX | | | | | | | | | | | | | | | | | | | | | | | | | | | | | 61st | 615 | |
| 2003 | Frank Cicci Racing | 34 | Chevy | | | | | | | TAL; 39 | | | RCH; 13 | GTY | NZH | CLT; 30 | DOV | NSH | KEN | MLW | DAY; 9 | CHI; 30 | NHA; 26 | PPR | IRP | MCH | BRI | DAR | RCH | DOV | KAN | CLT | MEM | ATL | PHO | CAR | HOM | 61st | 615 | |
| 2003 | Herzog-Jackson Motorsports | 92 | Chevy | | | | | | | | NSH; QL^{†} | CAL | | | | | | | | | | | | | | | | | | | | | | | | | | 61st | 615 | |
| 2004 | Roush Racing | 60 | Ford | DAY | CAR | LVS | DAR | BRI | TEX | NSH | TAL | CAL | GTY | RCH | NZH; QL^{‡} | CLT | DOV | NSH | KEN | MLW | DAY | CHI | NHA | PPR; QL^{‡} | IRP | MCH | | | | | | | | | | | | 38th | 1140 | |
| 2004 | Team Rensi Motorsports | 25 | Ford | | | | | | | | | | | | | | | | | | | | | | | | BRI; 12 | CAL; 11 | RCH; 24 | DOV; 2 | KAN; 11 | CLT; 12 | MEM; 18 | ATL; 41 | PHO; 36 | DAR; 39 | HOM; 16 | 38th | 1140 | |
^{†} - Qualified for Todd Bodine · ^{‡} - Qualified for Greg Biffle

==== Craftsman Truck Series ====
NASCAR Craftsman Truck Series results
| Year | Team | No. | Make | 1 | 2 | 3 | 4 | 5 | 6 | 7 | 8 | 9 | 10 | 11 | 12 | 13 | 14 | 15 | 16 | 17 | 18 | 19 | 20 | 21 | 22 | 23 | 24 | 25 | 26 | NCTC | Pts | Ref |
|---|---|---|---|---|---|---|---|---|---|---|---|---|---|---|---|---|---|---|---|---|---|---|---|---|---|---|---|---|---|---|---|---|
| 1996 | Chesrown Racing | 66 | Chevy | HOM | PHO | POR | EVG | TUS | CNS | HPT | BRI | NZH | MLW | LVL | I70 | IRP; 9 | FLM | GLN | NSV | RCH | NHA | MAR | NWS | SON | MMR | PHO | LVS | | | 91st | 138 | |
| 1997 | Ken Schrader Racing | 53 | Chevy | WDW | TUS | HOM | PHO | POR | EVG | I70 | NHA | TEX | BRI | NZH | MLW | LVL | CNS | HPT | IRP; 5 | FLM | NSV | GLN | RCH | MAR | SON | MMR | CAL | PHO | LVS | 91st | 155 | |

^{2} Competed only in companion events with Busch North Series as BNS driver and ineligible for Busch Series points

Sporting positions
| Preceded by Jimmy Spencer | NASCAR Winston Modified Tour Champion; 1988 | Succeeded by Mike Stefanik |
