= NASCAR Xfinity Series at New Hampshire Motor Speedway =

NASCAR Xfinity Series race at New Hampshire Motor Speedway

SciAps 200

NASCAR Xfinity Series
- Venue: New Hampshire Motor Speedway
- Location: Loudon, New Hampshire, United States
- Corporate sponsor: SciAps
- First race: 1990
- Last race: 2024
- Distance: 211.6 miles (340.5 km)
- Laps: 200; Stages 1/2: 45 each Final stage: 110
- Previous names: Budweiser 300 (1990–1992); NE Chevy 250 (1993–1994); NE Chevy Dealers 250 (1995); Stanley 200 (1996); United States Cellular 200 (1997); Gumout Long Life Formula 200 (1998); Busch 200 (1999–2000, 2002); CVS Pharmacy 200 Presented by Bayer (2001); New England 200 (2003, 2005–2006, 2010–2011); Siemens 200 (2004); Camping World 200 presented by RVs.com (2007); Camping World RV Sales 200 presented by RVs.com (2008); Camping World RV Sales 200 presented by Turtle Wax (2009); F.W. Webb 200 (2012); CNBC Prime's "The Profit" 200 (2013); Sta-Green 200 (2014); Lakes Region 200 (2015, 2018); AutoLotto 200 (2016); Overton's 200 (2017); ROXOR 200 (2019); Ambetter Get Vaccinated 200 (2021); Crayon 200 (2022); Ambetter Health 200 (2023); SciAps 200 (2024); Former second race: NE Chevy 250 (1990–1992)
- Most wins (driver): Kyle Busch (6)
- Most wins (team): Joe Gibbs Racing (14)
- Most wins (manufacturer): Toyota (14)

Circuit information
- Surface: Asphalt
- Length: 1.058 mi (1.703 km)
- Turns: 4

Stock car racing events in the NASCAR Xfinity Series were held at the New Hampshire Motor Speedway in Loudon, New Hampshire from 1990 to 2024. The race was held as a 200 lap (211.6 miles (340.5 km)) race under the SciAps 200 name for sponsorship reasons.

Christopher Bell is the last winner at New Hampshire for the Xfinity Series.

== History ==
When first held in 1990, the race was 300 laps. It was scaled back to 250 laps, the length of the 1990-1992 fall NHMS race, starting in 1993, and again to its current 200 laps in 1996.

From 1990 to 1992, New Hampshire held a second, 250 lap/264.5 miles (425.7 km) Busch Series race in the fall. The second race was removed from the schedule in 1993, in exchange for a Winston Cup Series race at the track.

During the practice for the 2000 event, Adam Petty died after he lost control of his car after his throttle were stuck wide open going into turn three; Petty's death was caused by a basilar skull fracture from the ensuing impact. Cup Series driver Kenny Irwin Jr. also died under similar circumstances during the practice of thatlook.com 300, occurring eight weeks later at the same track, leading NASCAR to make significant rule changes to maintain driver safety.

Until 2010, in 23 races held at NHMS, there had never been a repeat Xfinity Series winner, the longest such streak in any of NASCAR's national touring series. Kyle Busch broke the streak with victories in 2009 and 2010. He would also win the 2011, 2013, 2016, and 2017 Xfinity Series races at the track. Brad Keselowski and Christopher Bell would later also become repeat winners of the Xfinity Series race at New Hampshire. Additionally, Toyota and Joe Gibbs Racing won this race each year from 2008 to 2021 except for Keselowski's two wins in 2012 and 2014, both of which were for Team Penske. He drove a Dodge in 2012 and a Ford in 2014.

The 2020 race was canceled and replaced by a race at Kentucky Speedway due to the COVID-19 pandemic.

In 2021, the race returned to the Xfinity Series schedule and Ambetter (owned by Centene Corporation) became the title sponsor of the race. With them being a healthcare company and the race being held during the time when people were getting COVID-19 vaccines, Ambetter added "get vaccinated" in the name of the race next to their own so it would sound like "better get vaccinated" to encourage people to get a COVID-19 vaccine. On May 21, 2022, it was announced that Crayon Software Experts would be the title sponsor of the Xfinity Series of the race after Ambetter became the title sponsor of the Cup Series race at New Hampshire in 2022 (replacing Foxwoods Resort Casino).

The race was dropped from the Xfinity Series calendar in 2025, along with the races at Richmond and Michigan, as well as the second Darlington race.

== Past winners ==
| Year | Date | No. | Driver | Team | Manufacturer | Race Distance | | Race Time | Average Speed (mph) | Report |
| Year | Date | No. | Driver | Team | Manufacturer | Laps | Miles (km) | Race Time | Average Speed (mph) | Report |
|---|---|---|---|---|---|---|---|---|---|---|
| 1990 | July 15 | 99 | Tommy Ellis | J&J Racing | Buick | 300 | 317.4 (510.805) | 3:41:58 | 85.797 | Report |
| 1990 | October 14 | 22 | Rick Mast | A.G. Dillard Motorsports | Buick | 250 | 264.5 (425.671) | 2:44:37 | 94.405 | Report |
| 1991 | July 14 | 36 | Kenny Wallace | Rusty Wallace Racing | Pontiac | 300 | 317.4 (510.805) | 2:54:38 | 109.093 | Report |
| 1991 | October 13 | 25 | Ricky Craven | Ricky Craven | Chevrolet | 250 | 264.5 (425.671) | 2:54:43 | 90.832 | Report |
| 1992 | July 12 | 8 | Jeff Burton | FILMAR Racing | Oldsmobile | 300 | 317.4 (510.805) | 3:18:34 | 95.907 | Report |
| 1992 | August 23 | 87 | Joe Nemechek | NEMCO Motorsports | Chevrolet | 250 | 264.5 (425.671) | 2:47:14 | 94.897 | Report |
| 1993 | August 22 | 59 | Robert Pressley | Alliance Motorsports | Chevrolet | 250 | 264.5 (425.671) | 2:57:12 | 89.56 | Report |
| 1994 | May 7 | 82 | Derrike Cope | Ron Zock | Ford | 250 | 264.5 (425.671) | 2:59:16 | 88.527 | Report |
| 1995 | May 13 | 23 | Chad Little | Mark Rypien Motorsports | Ford | 250 | 264.5 (425.671) | 2:31:11 | 104.972 | Report |
| 1996 | July 12 | 74 | Randy LaJoie | BACE Motorsports | Chevrolet | 200 | 211.6 (340.537) | 2:10:57 | 96.953 | Report |
| 1997 | May 10 | 34 | Mike McLaughlin | Team 34 | Chevrolet | 200 | 211.6 (340.537) | 2:45:25 | 76.752 | Report |
| 1998 | May 9 | 00 | Buckshot Jones | Buckshot Racing | Pontiac | 200 | 211.6 (340.537) | 2:05:55 | 100.829 | Report |
| 1999 | May 8 | 98 | Elton Sawyer | Akins-Sutton Motorsports | Ford | 200 | 211.6 (340.537) | 2:03:42 | 103.324 | Report |
| 2000 | May 13 | 36 | Tim Fedewa | Cicci-Welliver Racing | Chevrolet | 200 | 211.6 (340.537) | 2:22:04 | 89.366 | Report |
| 2001 | May 12 | 57 | Jason Keller | ppc Racing | Ford | 200 | 211.6 (340.537) | 1:56:47 | 108.714 | Report |
| 2002 | May 11 | 25 | Bobby Hamilton Jr. | Team Rensi Motorsports | Ford | 200 | 211.6 (340.537) | 1:55:02 | 110.368 | Report |
| 2003 | July 19 | 37 | David Green | Brewco Motorsports | Pontiac | 200 | 211.6 (340.537) | 1:57:33 | 108.005 | Report |
| 2004 | July 24 | 17 | Matt Kenseth | Reiser Enterprises | Ford | 200 | 211.6 (340.537) | 2:15:29 | 93.709 | Report |
| 2005 | July 16 | 8 | Martin Truex Jr. | Chance 2 Motorsports | Chevrolet | 201* | 212.658 (342.239) | 2:18:33 | 92.093 | Report |
| 2006 | July 15 | 60 | Carl Edwards | Roush Racing | Ford | 200 | 211.6 (340.537) | 2:00:12 | 105.624 | Report |
| 2007 | June 30 | 21 | Kevin Harvick | Richard Childress Racing | Chevrolet | 200 | 211.6 (340.537) | 2:06:07 | 100.669 | Report |
| 2008 | June 28 | 20 | Tony Stewart | Joe Gibbs Racing | Toyota | 200 | 211.6 (340.537) | 1:56:27 | 109.025 | Report |
| 2009 | June 27 | 18 | Kyle Busch | Joe Gibbs Racing | Toyota | 200 | 211.6 (340.537) | 1:53:26 | 111.925 | Report |
| 2010 | June 26 | 18 | Kyle Busch | Joe Gibbs Racing | Toyota | 200 | 211.6 (340.537) | 1:54:43 | 110.673 | Report |
| 2011 | July 16 | 18 | Kyle Busch | Joe Gibbs Racing | Toyota | 206* | 217.948 (350.753) | 2:21:48 | 92.221 | Report |
| 2012 | July 14 | 22 | Brad Keselowski | Penske Racing | Dodge | 200 | 211.6 (340.537) | 1:58:46 | 106.899 | Report |
| 2013 | July 13 | 54 | Kyle Busch | Joe Gibbs Racing | Toyota | 213* | 225.354 (362.672) | 2:08:40 | 105.087 | Report |
| 2014 | July 12 | 22 | Brad Keselowski | Team Penske | Ford | 200 | 211.6 (340.537) | 2:00:41 | 105.201 | Report |
| 2015 | July 18 | 20 | Denny Hamlin | Joe Gibbs Racing | Toyota | 200 | 211.6 (340.537) | 2:09:06 | 98.342 | Report |
| 2016 | July 16 | 18 | Kyle Busch | Joe Gibbs Racing | Toyota | 200 | 211.6 (340.537) | 2:00:31 | 98.789 | Report |
| 2017 | July 15 | 18 | Kyle Busch | Joe Gibbs Racing | Toyota | 200 | 211.6 (340.537) | 1:56:11 | 109.276 | Report |
| 2018 | July 21 | 20 | Christopher Bell | Joe Gibbs Racing | Toyota | 200 | 211.6 (340.537) | 2:07:27 | 99.616 | Report |
| 2019 | July 20 | 20 | Christopher Bell | Joe Gibbs Racing | Toyota | 200 | 211.6 (340.537) | 2:01:39 | 104.365 | Report |
| 2020* | Not held | | | | | | | | | |
| 2021 | July 17 | 54 | Christopher Bell | Joe Gibbs Racing | Toyota | 200 | 211.6 (340.537) | 2:04:26 | 102.031 | Report |
| 2022 | July 16 | 7 | Justin Allgaier | JR Motorsports | Chevrolet | 200 | 211.6 (340.537) | 2:27:13 | 86.240 | Report |
| 2023 | July 15 | 20 | John Hunter Nemechek | Joe Gibbs Racing | Toyota | 206* | 217.948 (350.753) | 2:38:40 | 82.417 | Report |
| 2024 | June 22 | 20 | Christopher Bell | Joe Gibbs Racing | Toyota | 203* | 214.774 (345.645) | 2:35:21 | 82.951 | Report |

- 2005, 2011, and 2013: Race extended due to a green–white–checker finish. 2013 race took three attempts.
- 2020: Race canceled and moved to Kentucky due to the COVID-19 pandemic.
- 2023 and 2024: Races extended due to NASCAR Overtime.

=== Multiple winners (drivers) ===
| # Wins | Driver | Years won |
|---|---|---|
| 6 | Kyle Busch | 2009–2011, 2013, 2016, 2017 |
| 4 | Christopher Bell | 2018, 2019, 2021, 2024 |
| 2 | Brad Keselowski | 2012, 2014 |

=== Multiple winners (teams) ===
| # Wins | Team | Years won |
|---|---|---|
| 13 | Joe Gibbs Racing | 2008–2011, 2013, 2015–2019, 2021, 2023, 2024 |
| 2 | Cicci-Welliver Racing | 1997, 2000 |
| 2 | Team Penske | 2012, 2014 |

=== Manufacturer wins ===
| # Wins | Make | Years won |
|---|---|---|
| 13 | (Japan) Toyota | 2008–2011, 2013, 2015–2019, 2021, 2023, 2024 |
| 9 | (United States) Chevrolet | 1991 (1 of 2), 1992 (1 of 2), 1993, 1996, 1997, 2000, 2005, 2007, 2022 |
| 8 | (United States) Ford | 1994, 1995, 1999, 2001, 2002, 2004, 2006, 2014 |
| 3 | (United States) Pontiac | 1991 (1 of 2), 1998, 2003 |
| 2 | (United States) Buick | 1990 (2 of 2) |
| 1 | (United States) Oldsmobile | 1992 (1 of 2) |
| 1 | (United States) Dodge | 2012 |
