= 1992 Budweiser at The Glen =

18th race of the 1992 NASCAR Winston Cup Series

Race details
- Race 18 of 29 in the 1992 NASCAR Winston Cup Series
- The 1992 Budweiser at The Glen program cover, featuring Bill Elliott.
- Date: August 9, 1992
- Official name: 7th Annual Budweiser at The Glen
- Location: Watkins Glen, New York, Watkins Glen International
- Course: Permanent racing facility
- Course length: 2.45 miles (3.949 km)
- Distance: 51 laps, 125.154 mi (88.980 km)
- Scheduled distance: 90 laps, 220.5 mi (354.86 km)
- Average speed: 84.771 miles per hour (136.426 km/h)

Pole position
Driver	Dale Earnhardt	Richard Childress Racing
- Time: 1:15.603

Most laps led
Driver	Ernie Irvan; Kyle Petty	Morgan-McClure Motorsports; SABCO Racing
- Laps: 19

Winner
No. 42	Kyle Petty	SABCO Racing

Television in the United States
- Network: ESPN
- Announcers: Bob Jenkins, Ned Jarrett, Benny Parsons

Radio in the United States
- Radio: Motor Racing Network

The 1992 Budweiser at The Glen was the 18th stock car race of the 1992 NASCAR Winston Cup Series season and the seventh iteration of the event. The race was held on Sunday, August 9, 1992, in Watkins Glen, New York, at the shortened layout of Watkins Glen International, a 2.45-mile (3.94 km) permanent road course layout. The race was shortened from the scheduled 90 laps to 51 laps due to rain. With the help of a fast final pit stop, SABCO Racing driver Kyle Petty would manage to lead at the halfway point at lap 45 when the caution flag for rain would come out the next lap. When the race was eventually stopped on lap 51, the race had already hit the halfway point, with NASCAR officials deciding to call the race official, handing Petty the victory. The victory was Petty's fifth career NASCAR Winston Cup Series victory and his first victory of the season. To fill out the top three, Wood Brothers Racing driver Morgan Shepherd and Morgan–McClure Motorsports driver Ernie Irvan would finish second and third, respectively.

With a poor finish from Davey Allison's relief driver, Dorsey Schroeder, driver's championship contender Bill Elliott would manage to retake the points lead, leading Allison by 17 points.

== Background ==
The layout of Watkins Glen International NASCAR uses.

Watkins Glen International (nicknamed "The Glen") is an automobile race track located in Watkins Glen, New York at the southern tip of Seneca Lake. It was long known around the world as the home of the Formula One United States Grand Prix, which it hosted for twenty consecutive years (1961–1980), but the site has been home to road racing of nearly every class, including the World Sportscar Championship, Trans-Am, Can-Am, NASCAR Sprint Cup Series, the International Motor Sports Association and the IndyCar Series.

Initially, public roads in the village were used for the race course. In 1956 a permanent circuit for the race was built. In 1968 the race was extended to six hours, becoming the 6 Hours of Watkins Glen. The circuit's current layout has more or less been the same since 1971, although a chicane was installed at the uphill Esses in 1975 to slow cars through these corners, where there was a fatality during practice at the 1973 United States Grand Prix. The chicane was removed in 1985, but another chicane called the "Inner Loop" was installed in 1992 after J. D. McDuffie's fatal accident during the previous year's NASCAR Winston Cup event.

The circuit is known as the Mecca of North American road racing and is a very popular venue among fans and drivers. The facility is currently owned by NASCAR.

=== Entry list ===
- (R) denotes rookie driver.

No.	Driver	Team	Make
1	Rick Mast	Precision Products Racing	Oldsmobile
2	Rusty Wallace	Penske Racing South	Pontiac
3	Dale Earnhardt	Richard Childress Racing	Chevrolet
4	Ernie Irvan	Morgan–McClure Motorsports	Chevrolet
5	Ricky Rudd	Hendrick Motorsports	Chevrolet
6	Mark Martin	Roush Racing	Ford
7	Alan Kulwicki	AK Racing	Ford
8	Dick Trickle	Stavola Brothers Racing	Ford
10	Derrike Cope	Whitcomb Racing	Chevrolet
11	Bill Elliott	Junior Johnson & Associates	Ford
12	Hut Stricklin	Bobby Allison Motorsports	Chevrolet
15	Geoff Bodine	Bud Moore Engineering	Ford
16	Wally Dallenbach Jr.	Roush Racing	Ford
17	Darrell Waltrip	Darrell Waltrip Motorsports	Chevrolet
18	Dale Jarrett	Joe Gibbs Racing	Chevrolet
21	Morgan Shepherd	Wood Brothers Racing	Ford
22	Sterling Marlin	Junior Johnson & Associates	Ford
25	Ken Schrader	Hendrick Motorsports	Chevrolet
26	Brett Bodine	King Racing	Ford
27	Bob Schacht (R)	Linro Motorsports	Oldsmobile
28	Davey Allison*	Robert Yates Racing	Ford
30	Michael Waltrip	Bahari Racing	Pontiac
31	Bobby Hillin Jr.	Team Ireland	Chevrolet
33	Harry Gant	Leo Jackson Motorsports	Oldsmobile
34	Todd Bodine	Team 34	Ford
41	Greg Sacks	Larry Hedrick Motorsports	Chevrolet
42	Kyle Petty	SABCO Racing	Pontiac
43	Richard Petty	Petty Enterprises	Pontiac
45	Ed Ferree	Ferree Racing	Buick
48	James Hylton	Hylton Motorsports	Pontiac
52	Scott Sharp	Jimmy Means Racing	Pontiac
55	Ted Musgrave	RaDiUs Motorsports	Oldsmobile
61	Tom Rotsell	Chilsom Racing	Ford
65	Jerry O'Neil	Aroneck Racing	Oldsmobile
66	Jimmy Hensley (R)	Cale Yarborough Motorsports	Ford
68	Bobby Hamilton	TriStar Motorsports	Oldsmobile
69	Denny Wilson	Bahre Racing	Pontiac
71	Dave Marcis	Marcis Auto Racing	Chevrolet
77	Mike Potter	Balough Racing	Chevrolet
94	Terry Labonte	Hagan Racing	Oldsmobile

*Due to injuries sustained in a crash at the 1992 Miller Genuine Draft 500, Allison would be replaced by relief driver Dorsey Schroeder for qualifying. During the race, Allison would manage to start the race, before being replaced by Schroeder. As a result of starting the race, Allison is credited with the finish.

== Qualifying ==
Qualifying was split into two rounds. The first round was held on Friday, August 7, at 3:00 PM EST. Each driver would have one lap to set a time. During the first round, the top 20 drivers in the round would be guaranteed a starting spot in the race. If a driver was not able to guarantee a spot in the first round, they had the option to scrub their time from the first round and try and run a faster lap time in a second round qualifying run, held on Saturday, August 8, at 11:00 AM EST. As with the first round, each driver would have one lap to set a time. For this specific race, positions 21-38 would be decided on time, and depending on who needed it, a select amount of positions were given to cars who had not otherwise qualified but were high enough in owner's points; up to two provisionals were given. If needed, a past champion who did not qualify on either time or provisionals could use a champion's provisional, adding one more spot to the field.

Dale Earnhardt, driving for Richard Childress Racing, would win the pole, setting a time of 1:15.603 and an average speed of 116.662 mph (187.749 km/h) in the first round.

Tom Rotsell was the only driver to fail to qualify.

=== Full qualifying results ===
Pos.	No.	Driver	Team	Make	Time	Speed
1	3	Dale Earnhardt	Richard Childress Racing	Chevrolet	1:15.603	116.662
2	42	Kyle Petty	SABCO Racing	Pontiac	1:15.763	116.416
3	26	Brett Bodine	King Racing	Ford	1:15.769	116.406
4	5	Ricky Rudd	Hendrick Motorsports	Chevrolet	1:15.800	116.359
5	6	Mark Martin	Roush Racing	Ford	1:15.822	116.320
6	11	Bill Elliott	Junior Johnson & Associates	Ford	1:15.871	116.250
7	18	Dale Jarrett	Joe Gibbs Racing	Chevrolet	1:15.892	116.218
8	2	Rusty Wallace	Penske Racing South	Pontiac	1:15.894	116.215
9	15	Geoff Bodine	Bud Moore Engineering	Ford	1:15.906	116.196
10	4	Ernie Irvan	Morgan–McClure Motorsports	Chevrolet	1:16.073	115.941
11	28	Dorsey Schroeder	Robert Yates Racing	Ford	1:16.175	115.786
12	16	Wally Dallenbach Jr.	Roush Racing	Ford	1:16.567	115.193
13	25	Ken Schrader	Hendrick Motorsports	Chevrolet	1:16.610	115.129
14	31	Bobby Hillin Jr.	Team Ireland	Chevrolet	1:16.660	115.053
15	17	Darrell Waltrip	Darrell Waltrip Motorsports	Chevrolet	1:16.737	114.938
16	21	Morgan Shepherd	Wood Brothers Racing	Ford	1:16.744	114.928
17	7	Alan Kulwicki	AK Racing	Ford	1:16.747	114.923
18	43	Richard Petty	Petty Enterprises	Pontiac	1:17.044	114.480
19	94	Terry Labonte	Hagan Racing	Oldsmobile	1:17.136	114.343
20	10	Derrike Cope	Whitcomb Racing	Chevrolet	1:17.194	114.258
Failed to lock in Round 1
21	34	Todd Bodine	Team 34	Ford	1:17.287	114.120
22	52	Scott Sharp	Jimmy Means Racing	Pontiac	1:17.358	114.015
23	55	Ted Musgrave	RaDiUs Motorsports	Ford	1:17.532	113.759
24	33	Harry Gant	Leo Jackson Motorsports	Oldsmobile	1:17.541	113.746
25	30	Michael Waltrip	Bahari Racing	Pontiac	1:17.584	113.683
26	12	Hut Stricklin	Bobby Allison Motorsports	Chevrolet	1:17.687	113.576
27	1	Rick Mast	Precision Products Racing	Oldsmobile	1:17.788	113.385
28	71	Dave Marcis	Marcis Auto Racing	Chevrolet	1:17.834	113.318
29	68	Bobby Hamilton	TriStar Motorsports	Oldsmobile	1:18.134	112.883
30	45	Ed Ferree	Ferree Racing	Buick	1:18.358	112.560
31	22	Sterling Marlin	Junior Johnson & Associates	Ford	1:18.775	111.964
32	66	Jimmy Hensley (R)	Cale Yarborough Motorsports	Ford	1:20.509	109.553
33	65	Jerry O'Neil	Aroneck Racing	Oldsmobile	1:21.491	108.233
34	41	Greg Sacks	Larry Hedrick Motorsports	Chevrolet	1:22.031	107.520
35	8	Dick Trickle	Stavola Brothers Racing	Ford	1:22.971	106.302
36	27	Bob Schacht (R)	Linro Motorsports	Oldsmobile	1:23.235	105.965
37	69	Denny Wilson	Bahre Racing	Pontiac	1:25.358	103.330
38	77	Mike Potter	Balough Racing	Buick	1:28.145	100.062
Provisional
39	48	James Hylton	Hylton Motorsports	Pontiac	-	-
Failed to qualify
40	61	Tom Rotsell	Chilsom Racing	Ford	-	-
Official first round qualifying results
Official starting lineup

== Race results ==
Fin	St	No.	Driver	Team	Make	Laps	Led	Status	Pts	Winnings
1	2	42	Kyle Petty	SABCO Racing	Pontiac	51	19	running	185	$50,895
2	16	21	Morgan Shepherd	Wood Brothers Racing	Ford	51	0	running	170	$48,545
3	10	4	Ernie Irvan	Morgan–McClure Motorsports	Chevrolet	51	19	running	175	$35,060
4	5	6	Mark Martin	Roush Racing	Ford	51	0	running	160	$28,325
5	12	16	Wally Dallenbach Jr.	Roush Racing	Ford	51	0	running	155	$13,480
6	8	2	Rusty Wallace	Penske Racing South	Pontiac	51	0	running	150	$18,240
7	17	7	Alan Kulwicki	AK Racing	Ford	51	0	running	146	$20,095
8	19	94	Terry Labonte	Hagan Racing	Oldsmobile	51	0	running	142	$14,110
9	1	3	Dale Earnhardt	Richard Childress Racing	Chevrolet	51	10	running	143	$22,430
10	3	26	Brett Bodine	King Racing	Ford	51	0	running	134	$15,840
11	23	55	Ted Musgrave	RaDiUs Motorsports	Ford	51	0	running	130	$12,230
12	15	17	Darrell Waltrip	Darrell Waltrip Motorsports	Chevrolet	51	0	running	127	$15,490
13	4	5	Ricky Rudd	Hendrick Motorsports	Chevrolet	51	0	running	124	$14,400
14	6	11	Bill Elliott	Junior Johnson & Associates	Ford	51	0	running	121	$13,660
15	7	18	Dale Jarrett	Joe Gibbs Racing	Chevrolet	51	0	running	118	$11,420
16	31	22	Sterling Marlin	Junior Johnson & Associates	Ford	51	0	running	115	$11,050
17	28	71	Dave Marcis	Marcis Auto Racing	Chevrolet	51	0	running	112	$7,730
18	24	33	Harry Gant	Leo Jackson Motorsports	Oldsmobile	51	0	running	109	$15,110
19	22	52	Scott Sharp	Jimmy Means Racing	Pontiac	51	0	running	106	$7,155
20	11	28	Davey Allison	Robert Yates Racing	Ford	51	0	running	103	$15,560
21	13	25	Ken Schrader	Hendrick Motorsports	Chevrolet	51	0	running	100	$13,635
22	29	68	Bobby Hamilton	TriStar Motorsports	Oldsmobile	51	0	running	97	$10,515
23	14	31	Bobby Hillin Jr.	Team Ireland	Chevrolet	51	0	running	94	$4,420
24	35	8	Dick Trickle	Stavola Brothers Racing	Ford	51	3	running	96	$6,260
25	33	65	Jerry O'Neil	Aroneck Racing	Oldsmobile	51	0	running	88	$5,075
26	32	66	Jimmy Hensley (R)	Cale Yarborough Motorsports	Ford	51	0	running	85	$6,365
27	9	15	Geoff Bodine	Bud Moore Engineering	Ford	50	0	running	82	$8,905
28	18	43	Richard Petty	Petty Enterprises	Pontiac	50	0	running	79	$8,745
29	30	45	Ed Ferree	Ferree Racing	Buick	50	0	running	76	$4,035
30	36	27	Bob Schacht (R)	Linro Motorsports	Oldsmobile	49	0	running	73	$3,975
31	34	41	Greg Sacks	Larry Hedrick Motorsports	Chevrolet	49	0	running	70	$5,415
32	27	1	Rick Mast	Precision Products Racing	Oldsmobile	47	0	running	67	$8,825
33	38	77	Mike Potter	Balough Racing	Buick	45	0	running	64	$3,690
34	20	10	Derrike Cope	Whitcomb Racing	Chevrolet	36	0	engine	61	$5,130
35	25	30	Michael Waltrip	Bahari Racing	Pontiac	35	0	crash	58	$8,095
36	26	12	Hut Stricklin	Bobby Allison Motorsports	Chevrolet	33	0	transmission	55	$8,040
37	21	34	Todd Bodine	Team 34	Ford	16	0	crash	52	$3,485
38	37	69	Denny Wilson	Bahre Racing	Pontiac	9	0	clutch	49	$3,450
39	39	48	James Hylton	Hylton Motorsports	Pontiac	1	0	quit	46	$3,395
Official race results

== Standings after the race ==
Drivers' Championship standings

	Pos	Driver	Points
1	1	Bill Elliott	2,621
1	2	Davey Allison	2,604 (–17)
	3	Alan Kulwicki	2,527 (–94)
	4	Harry Gant	2,481 (–140)
	5	Mark Martin	2,368 (–253)
	6	Ricky Rudd	2,326 (–295)
	7	Terry Labonte	2,307 (–314)
	8	Dale Earnhardt	2,285 (–336)
2	9	Kyle Petty	2,281 (–340)
1	10	Morgan Shepherd	2,281 (–340)
Official driver's standings

- Note: Only the first 10 positions are included for the driver standings.

Previous race: 1992 DieHard 500	NASCAR Winston Cup Series; 1992 season	Next race: 1992 Champion Spark Plug 400
