= 1990 Budweiser at The Glen =

18th race of 1990 NASCAR Winston Cup Series

Race details
- Race 18 of 29 in the 1990 NASCAR Winston Cup Series
- The 1990 Budweiser at The Glen program cover, featuring Terry Labonte.
- Date: August 12, 1990
- Official name: 5th Annual Budweiser at The Glen
- Location: Watkins Glen, New York, Watkins Glen International
- Course: Permanent racing facility
- Course length: 2.428 miles (3.907 km)
- Distance: 90 laps, 218.52 mi (351.673 km)
- Scheduled distance: 90 laps, 218.52 mi (351.673 km)
- Average speed: 92.452 miles per hour (148.787 km/h)
- Attendance: 120,000

Pole position
Driver	Dale Earnhardt	Richard Childress Racing
- Time: 1:12.125

Most laps led
Driver	Rusty Wallace	Blue Max Racing
- Laps: 28

Winner
No. 5	Ricky Rudd	Hendrick Motorsports

Television in the United States
- Network: ESPN
- Announcers: Bob Jenkins, Ned Jarrett, Benny Parsons

Radio in the United States
- Radio: Motor Racing Network

The 1990 Budweiser at The Glen was the 18th stock car race of the 1990 NASCAR Winston Cup Series season and the fifth iteration of the event. The race was held on Sunday, August 12, 1990, before an audience of 120,000 in Watkins Glen, New York, at the shortened layout of Watkins Glen International, a 2.428-mile (3.907 km) permanent road course layout. On the final restart with three laps to go in the race, Hendrick Motorsports driver Ricky Rudd would manage to defend the field and pull away for the victory, coming back from an early spin in the race and two flat tires. The victory was Rudd's 11th career NASCAR Winston Cup Series victory and his only victory of the season. To fill out the top three, Junior Johnson & Associates driver Geoff Bodine and King Racing driver Brett Bodine would finish second and third, respectively.

== Background ==
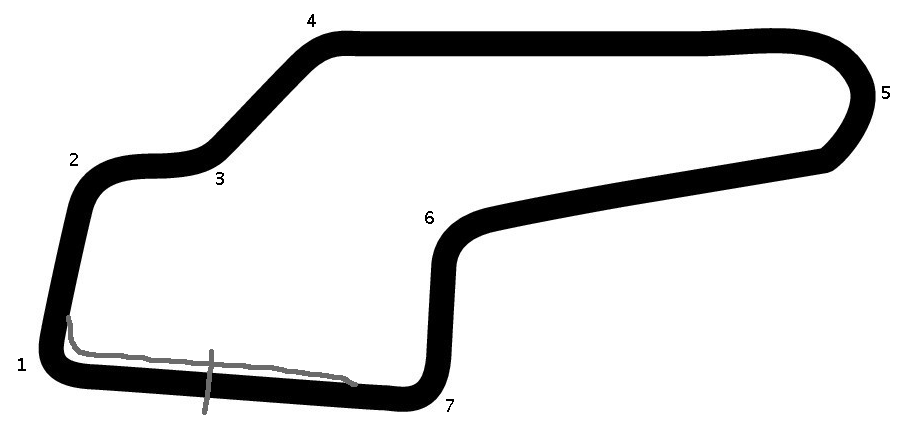
The layout of Watkins Glen International NASCAR used at the time.

Watkins Glen International (nicknamed "The Glen") is an automobile race track located in Watkins Glen, New York at the southern tip of Seneca Lake. It was long known around the world as the home of the Formula One United States Grand Prix, which it hosted for twenty consecutive years (1961–1980), but the site has been home to road racing of nearly every class, including the World Sportscar Championship, Trans-Am, Can-Am, NASCAR Sprint Cup Series, the International Motor Sports Association and the IndyCar Series.

Initially, public roads in the village were used for the race course. In 1956 a permanent circuit for the race was built. In 1968 the race was extended to six hours, becoming the 6 Hours of Watkins Glen. The circuit's current layout has more or less been the same since 1971, although a chicane was installed at the uphill Esses in 1975 to slow cars through these corners, where there was a fatality during practice at the 1973 United States Grand Prix. The chicane was removed in 1985, but another chicane called the "Inner Loop" was installed in 1992 after J. D. McDuffie's fatal accident during the previous year's NASCAR Winston Cup event.

The circuit is known as the Mecca of North American road racing and is a very popular venue among fans and drivers. The facility is currently owned by International Speedway Corporation.

=== Entry list ===
- (R) denotes rookie driver.

#	Driver	Team	Make
0	Irv Hoerr	Precision Products Racing	Oldsmobile
1	Terry Labonte	Precision Products Racing	Oldsmobile
2	Jerry O'Neil (R)	U.S. Racing	Pontiac
3	Dale Earnhardt	Richard Childress Racing	Chevrolet
4	Ernie Irvan	Morgan–McClure Motorsports	Oldsmobile
04	John Alexander	Meacham Racing	Ford
5	Ricky Rudd	Hendrick Motorsports	Chevrolet
6	Mark Martin	Roush Racing	Ford
7	Alan Kulwicki	AK Racing	Ford
8	Bobby Hillin Jr.	Stavola Brothers Racing	Buick
9	Bill Elliott	Melling Racing	Ford
10	Derrike Cope	Whitcomb Racing	Chevrolet
11	Geoff Bodine	Junior Johnson & Associates	Ford
12	Hut Stricklin	Bobby Allison Motorsports	Buick
13	Oma Kimbrough	Linro Motorsports	Buick
15	Morgan Shepherd	Bud Moore Engineering	Ford
17	Sarel van der Merwe	Hendrick Motorsports	Chevrolet
18	Greg Sacks	Hendrick Motorsports	Chevrolet
20	Rob Moroso (R)	Moroso Racing	Oldsmobile
21	Dale Jarrett	Wood Brothers Racing	Ford
22	Rick Ware	U.S. Racing	Pontiac
25	Ken Schrader	Hendrick Motorsports	Chevrolet
26	Brett Bodine	King Racing	Buick
27	Rusty Wallace	Blue Max Racing	Pontiac
28	Davey Allison	Robert Yates Racing	Ford
30	Michael Waltrip	Bahari Racing	Pontiac
33	Harry Gant	Leo Jackson Motorsports	Oldsmobile
38	Dick Johnson	Dick Johnson Racing	Ford
40	Tommy Kendall	Reno Enterprises	Chevrolet
42	Kyle Petty	SABCO Racing	Pontiac
43	Richard Petty	Petty Enterprises	Pontiac
52	Jimmy Means	Jimmy Means Racing	Pontiac
54	Tommy Riggins	Hakes–Welliver Racing	Oldsmobile
57	Jimmy Spencer	Osterlund Racing	Pontiac
66	Dick Trickle	Cale Yarborough Motorsports	Pontiac
70	J. D. McDuffie	McDuffie Racing	Pontiac
71	Dave Marcis	Marcis Auto Racing	Chevrolet
75	Rick Wilson	RahMoc Enterprises	Pontiac
90	Troy Beebe*	Donlavey Racing	Ford
94	Sterling Marlin	Hagan Racing	Oldsmobile
98	Butch Miller	Travis Carter Enterprises	Chevrolet

*Withdrew after Beebe was involved in an accident during a practice session on Thursday, leaving Beebe with a concussion.

== Qualifying ==
Qualifying was split into two rounds. The first round was held on Friday, August 10, at 1:00 PM EST. Each driver would have one lap to set a time. During the first round, the top 20 drivers in the round would be guaranteed a starting spot in the race. If a driver was not able to guarantee a spot in the first round, they had the option to scrub their time from the first round and try and run a faster lap time in a second round qualifying run, held on Saturday, August 11, at 11:00 AM EST. As with the first round, each driver would have one lap to set a time. For this specific race, positions 21-40 would be decided on time, and depending on who needed it, a select amount of positions were given to cars who had not otherwise qualified on time but were high enough in owner's points; up to two provisionals were given.

Dale Earnhardt, driving for Richard Childress Racing, would win the pole, setting a time of 1:12.125 and an average speed of 121.190 mph (195.036 km/h) in the first round.

No drivers would fail to qualify.

=== Full qualifying results ===
Pos.	#	Driver	Team	Make	Time	Speed
1	3	Dale Earnhardt	Richard Childress Racing	Chevrolet	1:12.125	121.190
2	1	Terry Labonte	Precision Products Racing	Oldsmobile	1:12.431	120.678
3	6	Mark Martin	Roush Racing	Ford	1:12.569	120.448
4	27	Rusty Wallace	Blue Max Racing	Pontiac	1:12.578	120.433
5	11	Geoff Bodine	Junior Johnson & Associates	Ford	1:12.616	120.370
6	9	Bill Elliott	Melling Racing	Ford	1:12.655	120.306
7	10	Derrike Cope	Whitcomb Racing	Chevrolet	1:12.986	119.760
8	30	Michael Waltrip	Bahari Racing	Pontiac	1:12.996	119.744
9	7	Alan Kulwicki	AK Racing	Ford	1:13.006	119.727
10	40	Tommy Kendall	Reno Enterprises	Chevrolet	1:13.022	119.701
11	25	Ken Schrader	Hendrick Motorsports	Chevrolet	1:13.026	119.694
12	5	Ricky Rudd	Hendrick Motorsports	Chevrolet	1:13.074	119.616
13	26	Brett Bodine	King Racing	Buick	1:13.160	119.475
14	42	Kyle Petty	SABCO Racing	Pontiac	1:13.429	119.037
15	38	Dick Johnson	Dick Johnson Racing	Ford	1:13.471	118.969
16	12	Hut Stricklin	Bobby Allison Motorsports	Buick	1:13.539	118.859
17	94	Sterling Marlin	Hagan Racing	Oldsmobile	1:13.581	118.792
18	0	Irv Hoerr	Precision Products Racing	Oldsmobile	1:13.715	118.576
19	20	Rob Moroso (R)	Moroso Racing	Oldsmobile	1:13.879	118.312
20	17	Sarel van der Merwe	Hendrick Motorsports	Chevrolet	1:13.881	118.309
Failed to lock in Round 1
21	28	Davey Allison	Robert Yates Racing	Ford	1:12.865	119.959
22	4	Ernie Irvan	Morgan–McClure Motorsports	Chevrolet	1:13.045	119.663
23	15	Morgan Shepherd	Bud Moore Engineering	Ford	1:13.682	118.629
24	18	Greg Sacks	Hendrick Motorsports	Chevrolet	1:13.973	118.162
25	8	Bobby Hillin Jr.	Stavola Brothers Racing	Buick	1:13.988	118.138
26	21	Dale Jarrett	Wood Brothers Racing	Ford	1:14.275	117.682
27	33	Harry Gant	Leo Jackson Motorsports	Oldsmobile	1:14.461	117.388
28	43	Richard Petty	Petty Enterprises	Pontiac	1:14.692	117.025
29	75	Rick Wilson	RahMoc Enterprises	Oldsmobile	1:14.834	116.803
30	71	Dave Marcis	Marcis Auto Racing	Chevrolet	1:14.843	116.788
31	57	Jimmy Spencer	Osterlund Racing	Pontiac	1:14.890	116.715
32	54	Tommy Riggins	Hakes–Welliver Racing	Oldsmobile	1:14.936	116.644
33	66	Dick Trickle	Cale Yarborough Motorsports	Pontiac	1:16.018	114.983
34	52	Jimmy Means	Jimmy Means Racing	Pontiac	1:16.018	114.983
35	22	Rick Ware	U.S. Racing	Pontiac	1:16.458	114.322
36	2	Jerry O'Neil (R)	U.S. Racing	Pontiac	1:17.874	112.243
37	13	Oma Kimbrough	Linro Motorsports	Buick	1:18.002	112.059
38	70	J. D. McDuffie	McDuffie Racing	Pontiac	1:19.692	109.682
39	04	John Alexander	Meacham Racing	Ford	1:19.955	109.321
Provisional
40	98	Butch Miller	Travis Carter Enterprises	Chevrolet	-	-
Withdrew
WD	90	Troy Beebe	Donlavey Racing	Ford	-	-
Official first round qualifying results
Official starting lineup

== Race results ==
Fin	St	#	Driver	Team	Make	Laps	Led	Status	Pts	Winnings
1	12	5	Ricky Rudd	Hendrick Motorsports	Chevrolet	90	20	running	180	$55,000
2	5	11	Geoff Bodine	Junior Johnson & Associates	Ford	90	5	running	175	$33,900
3	13	26	Brett Bodine	King Racing	Buick	90	0	running	165	$22,490
4	8	30	Michael Waltrip	Bahari Racing	Pontiac	90	0	running	160	$16,980
5	3	6	Mark Martin	Roush Racing	Ford	90	16	running	160	$20,790
6	23	15	Morgan Shepherd	Bud Moore Engineering	Ford	90	0	running	150	$12,775
7	1	3	Dale Earnhardt	Richard Childress Racing	Chevrolet	90	11	running	151	$22,380
8	10	40	Tommy Kendall	Reno Enterprises	Chevrolet	90	0	running	142	$6,570
9	11	25	Ken Schrader	Hendrick Motorsports	Chevrolet	90	0	running	138	$13,040
10	18	0	Irv Hoerr	Precision Products Racing	Oldsmobile	90	3	running	139	$7,775
11	9	7	Alan Kulwicki	AK Racing	Ford	90	6	running	135	$10,040
12	6	9	Bill Elliott	Melling Racing	Ford	90	0	running	127	$13,400
13	19	20	Rob Moroso (R)	Moroso Racing	Oldsmobile	90	0	running	124	$5,360
14	2	1	Terry Labonte	Precision Products Racing	Oldsmobile	90	0	running	121	$8,270
15	17	94	Sterling Marlin	Hagan Racing	Oldsmobile	90	0	running	118	$8,555
16	25	8	Bobby Hillin Jr.	Stavola Brothers Racing	Buick	89	0	running	115	$7,660
17	14	42	Kyle Petty	SABCO Racing	Pontiac	89	0	running	112	$10,940
18	28	43	Richard Petty	Petty Enterprises	Pontiac	89	0	running	109	$5,120
19	21	28	Davey Allison	Robert Yates Racing	Ford	89	0	running	106	$12,165
20	26	21	Dale Jarrett	Wood Brothers Racing	Ford	88	0	running	103	$7,445
21	27	33	Harry Gant	Leo Jackson Motorsports	Oldsmobile	85	0	running	100	$10,335
22	38	70	J. D. McDuffie	McDuffie Racing	Pontiac	84	0	running	97	$3,225
23	16	12	Hut Stricklin	Bobby Allison Motorsports	Buick	82	1	accident	99	$4,130
24	20	17	Sarel van der Merwe	Hendrick Motorsports	Chevrolet	77	0	accident	91	$12,070
25	40	98	Butch Miller	Travis Carter Enterprises	Chevrolet	75	0	engine	88	$4,085
26	36	2	Jerry O'Neil (R)	U.S. Racing	Pontiac	74	0	running	85	$2,975
27	15	38	Dick Johnson	Dick Johnson Racing	Ford	67	0	handling	82	$2,915
28	22	4	Ernie Irvan	Morgan–McClure Motorsports	Chevrolet	65	0	running	79	$5,705
29	31	57	Jimmy Spencer	Osterlund Racing	Pontiac	63	0	engine	76	$5,545
30	33	66	Dick Trickle	Cale Yarborough Motorsports	Pontiac	60	0	transmission	73	$5,435
31	30	71	Dave Marcis	Marcis Auto Racing	Chevrolet	52	0	throttle	70	$5,250
32	29	75	Rick Wilson	RahMoc Enterprises	Oldsmobile	50	0	brakes	67	$5,160
33	32	54	Tommy Riggins	Hakes–Welliver Racing	Oldsmobile	48	0	transmission	64	$2,390
34	4	27	Rusty Wallace	Blue Max Racing	Pontiac	46	28	engine	71	$15,590
35	7	10	Derrike Cope	Whitcomb Racing	Chevrolet	45	0	engine	58	$7,330
36	35	22	Rick Ware	U.S. Racing	Pontiac	42	0	brakes	55	$2,295
37	37	13	Oma Kimbrough	Linro Motorsports	Buick	40	0	oil leak	52	$2,240
38	39	04	John Alexander	Meacham Racing	Ford	35	0	oil leak	49	$2,210
39	34	52	Jimmy Means	Jimmy Means Racing	Pontiac	33	0	transmission	46	$2,805
40	24	18	Greg Sacks	Hendrick Motorsports	Chevrolet	14	0	accident	43	$2,145
Official race results

== Standings after the race ==
Drivers' Championship standings

	Pos	Driver	Points
	1	Mark Martin	2,669
	2	Dale Earnhardt	2,659 (–10)
1	3	Geoff Bodine	2,549 (–120)
1	4	Rusty Wallace	2,409 (–260)
1	5	Kyle Petty	2,348 (–321)
1	6	Morgan Shepherd	2,331 (–338)
1	7	Bill Elliott	2,318 (–351)
1	8	Ken Schrader	2,307 (–362)
	9	Ernie Irvan	2,255 (–414)
	10	Ricky Rudd	2,174 (–495)
Official driver's standings

- Note: Only the first 10 positions are included for the driver standings.

Previous race: 1990 DieHard 500	NASCAR Winston Cup Series; 1990 season	Next race: 1990 Champion Spark Plug 400
