= 1993 GM Goodwrench 500 =

Second race of the 1993 NASCAR Winston Cup Series

Race details
- Race 2 of 30 in the 1993 NASCAR Winston Cup Series
- The 1993 GM Goodwrench 500 program cover, featuring Dale Earnhardt.
- Date: February 28, 1993
- Official name: 28th Annual GM Goodwrench 500
- Location: Rockingham, North Carolina, North Carolina Speedway
- Course: Permanent racing facility
- Course length: 1.017 miles (1.637 km)
- Distance: 492 laps, 500.364 mi (805.257 km)
- Scheduled distance: 492 laps, 500.364 mi (805.257 km)
- Average speed: 124.486 miles per hour (200.341 km/h)
- Attendance: 37,900

Pole position
| Driver | Mark Martin | Roush Racing |
- Time: 24.482

Most laps led
| Driver | Rusty Wallace | Penske Racing South |
- Laps: 203

Winner
| No. 2 | Rusty Wallace | Penske Racing South |

Television in the United States
- Network: TNN
- Announcers: Mike Joy, Buddy Baker, Neil Bonnett

Radio in the United States
- Radio: Motor Racing Network

The 1993 GM Goodwrench 500 was the second stock car race of the 1993 NASCAR Winston Cup Series season and the 29th iteration of the event. The race was held on Sunday, February 28, 1993, in Rockingham, North Carolina, at North Carolina Speedway, a 1.017 miles (1.637 km) permanent high-banked racetrack. The race took the scheduled 492 laps to complete. At race's end, Penske Racing South driver Rusty Wallace would manage to dominate the late stages of the race to take his 22nd career NASCAR Winston Cup Series victory and his first victory of the season. To fill out the top three, Richard Childress Racing driver Dale Earnhardt and Morgan–McClure Motorsports driver Ernie Irvan would finish second and third, respectively.

== Background ==
The layout of North Carolina Speedway, the venue where the race was held.

North Carolina Speedway was opened as a flat, one-mile oval on October 31, 1965. In 1969, the track was extensively reconfigured to a high-banked, D-shaped oval just over one mile in length. In 1997, North Carolina Motor Speedway merged with Penske Motorsports, and was renamed North Carolina Speedway. Shortly thereafter, the infield was reconfigured, and competition on the infield road course, mostly by the SCCA, was discontinued. Currently, the track is home to the Fast Track High Performance Driving School.

=== Entry list ===
- (R) denotes rookie driver.

| # | Driver | Team | Make |
|---|---|---|---|
| 1 | Rick Mast | Precision Products Racing | Ford |
| 2 | Rusty Wallace | Penske Racing South | Pontiac |
| 3 | Dale Earnhardt | Richard Childress Racing | Chevrolet |
| 4 | Ernie Irvan | Morgan–McClure Motorsports | Chevrolet |
| 5 | Ricky Rudd | Hendrick Motorsports | Chevrolet |
| 05 | Ed Ferree | Ferree Racing | Chevrolet |
| 6 | Mark Martin | Roush Racing | Ford |
| 7 | Alan Kulwicki | AK Racing | Ford |
| 8 | Sterling Marlin | Stavola Brothers Racing | Ford |
| 11 | Bill Elliott | Junior Johnson & Associates | Ford |
| 12 | Jimmy Spencer | Bobby Allison Motorsports | Ford |
| 14 | Terry Labonte | Hagan Racing | Chevrolet |
| 15 | Geoff Bodine | Bud Moore Engineering | Ford |
| 16 | Wally Dallenbach Jr. | Roush Racing | Ford |
| 17 | Darrell Waltrip | Darrell Waltrip Motorsports | Chevrolet |
| 18 | Dale Jarrett | Joe Gibbs Racing | Chevrolet |
| 21 | Morgan Shepherd | Wood Brothers Racing | Ford |
| 22 | Bobby Labonte (R) | Bill Davis Racing | Ford |
| 24 | Jeff Gordon (R) | Hendrick Motorsports | Chevrolet |
| 25 | Ken Schrader | Hendrick Motorsports | Chevrolet |
| 26 | Brett Bodine | King Racing | Ford |
| 27 | Hut Stricklin | Junior Johnson & Associates | Ford |
| 28 | Davey Allison | Robert Yates Racing | Ford |
| 30 | Michael Waltrip | Bahari Racing | Pontiac |
| 33 | Harry Gant | Leo Jackson Motorsports | Chevrolet |
| 40 | Kenny Wallace (R) | SABCO Racing | Pontiac |
| 41 | Phil Parsons | Larry Hedrick Motorsports | Chevrolet |
| 42 | Kyle Petty | SABCO Racing | Pontiac |
| 44 | Rick Wilson | Petty Enterprises | Pontiac |
| 48 | James Hylton | Hylton Motorsports | Pontiac |
| 49 | Stanley Smith | BS&S Motorsports | Chevrolet |
| 52 | Jimmy Hensley | Jimmy Means Racing | Ford |
| 55 | Ted Musgrave | RaDiUs Motorsports | Ford |
| 56 | Jerry Hill | Hill Motorsports | Chevrolet |
| 64 | Johnny Chapman | Bahre Racing | Pontiac |
| 68 | Bobby Hamilton | TriStar Motorsports | Ford |
| 71 | Dave Marcis | Marcis Auto Racing | Chevrolet |
| 75 | Dick Trickle | Butch Mock Motorsports | Ford |
| 77 | Mike Potter | Gray Racing | Ford |
| 90 | Bobby Hillin Jr. | Donlavey Racing | Ford |
| 98 | Derrike Cope | Cale Yarborough Motorsports | Ford |

== Qualifying ==
Qualifying was originally scheduled to be split into two rounds. The first round was scheduled to be held on Friday, February 26, at 2:30 PM EST. However, due to rain, the first round was cancelled, and qualifying was condensed into one round, which was held on Saturday, February 27, at 11:15 AM EST. Each driver would have one lap to set a time. For this specific race, positions 21-38 would be decided on time, and depending on who needed it, a select amount of positions were given to cars who had not otherwise qualified but were high enough in owner's points; up to two provisionals were given. If needed, a past champion who did not qualify on either time or provisionals could use a champion's provisional, adding one more spot to the field.

Mark Martin, driving for Roush Racing, won the pole, setting a time of 24.482 and an average speed of 149.547 mph (240.673 km/h) in the first round.

Stanley Smith was the only driver to fail to qualify.

=== Full qualifying results ===
| Pos. | # | Driver | Team | Make | Time | Speed |
|---|---|---|---|---|---|---|
| 1 | 6 | Mark Martin | Roush Racing | Ford | 24.482 | 149.547 |
| 2 | 4 | Ernie Irvan | Morgan–McClure Motorsports | Chevrolet | 24.496 | 149.461 |
| 3 | 11 | Bill Elliott | Junior Johnson & Associates | Ford | 24.519 | 149.321 |
| 4 | 1 | Rick Mast | Precision Products Racing | Ford | 24.531 | 149.248 |
| 5 | 55 | Ted Musgrave | RaDiUs Motorsports | Ford | 24.544 | 149.169 |
| 6 | 26 | Brett Bodine | King Racing | Ford | 24.553 | 149.114 |
| 7 | 3 | Dale Earnhardt | Richard Childress Racing | Chevrolet | 24.563 | 149.053 |
| 8 | 27 | Hut Stricklin | Junior Johnson & Associates | Ford | 24.579 | 148.956 |
| 9 | 98 | Derrike Cope | Cale Yarborough Motorsports | Ford | 24.615 | 148.739 |
| 10 | 2 | Rusty Wallace | Penske Racing South | Pontiac | 24.621 | 148.702 |
| 11 | 42 | Kyle Petty | SABCO Racing | Pontiac | 24.638 | 148.600 |
| 12 | 5 | Ricky Rudd | Hendrick Motorsports | Chevrolet | 24.661 | 148.461 |
| 13 | 25 | Ken Schrader | Hendrick Motorsports | Chevrolet | 24.675 | 148.377 |
| 14 | 15 | Geoff Bodine | Bud Moore Engineering | Ford | 24.683 | 148.329 |
| 15 | 44 | Rick Wilson | Petty Enterprises | Pontiac | 24.693 | 148.269 |
| 16 | 21 | Morgan Shepherd | Wood Brothers Racing | Ford | 24.706 | 148.191 |
| 17 | 41 | Phil Parsons | Larry Hedrick Motorsports | Chevrolet | 24.727 | 148.065 |
| 18 | 90 | Bobby Hillin Jr. | Donlavey Racing | Ford | 24.737 | 148.005 |
| 19 | 8 | Sterling Marlin | Stavola Brothers Racing | Ford | 24.738 | 147.999 |
| 20 | 7 | Alan Kulwicki | AK Racing | Ford | 24.742 | 147.975 |
| 21 | 14 | Terry Labonte | Hagan Racing | Chevrolet | 24.782 | 147.736 |
| 22 | 18 | Dale Jarrett | Joe Gibbs Racing | Chevrolet | 24.796 | 147.653 |
| 23 | 68 | Bobby Hamilton | TriStar Motorsports | Ford | 24.806 | 147.593 |
| 24 | 22 | Bobby Labonte (R) | Bill Davis Racing | Ford | 24.817 | 147.528 |
| 25 | 12 | Jimmy Spencer | Bobby Allison Motorsports | Ford | 24.832 | 147.439 |
| 26 | 33 | Harry Gant | Leo Jackson Motorsports | Chevrolet | 24.837 | 147.409 |
| 27 | 17 | Darrell Waltrip | Darrell Waltrip Motorsports | Chevrolet | 24.875 | 147.184 |
| 28 | 24 | Jeff Gordon (R) | Hendrick Motorsports | Chevrolet | 24.951 | 146.736 |
| 29 | 16 | Wally Dallenbach Jr. | Roush Racing | Ford | 24.962 | 146.671 |
| 30 | 30 | Michael Waltrip | Bahari Racing | Pontiac | 24.964 | 146.659 |
| 31 | 75 | Dick Trickle | Butch Mock Motorsports | Ford | 24.990 | 146.507 |
| 32 | 40 | Kenny Wallace (R) | SABCO Racing | Pontiac | 25.037 | 146.232 |
| 33 | 05 | Ed Ferree | Ferree Racing | Chevrolet | 25.197 | 145.303 |
| 34 | 52 | Jimmy Hensley | Jimmy Means Racing | Ford | 25.385 | 144.227 |
| 35 | 64 | Johnny Chapman | Bahre Racing | Pontiac | 25.646 | 142.759 |
| 36 | 77 | Mike Potter | Gray Racing | Ford | 25.716 | 142.371 |
| 37 | 56 | Jerry Hill | Hill Motorsports | Chevrolet | 26.433 | 138.509 |
| 38 | 48 | James Hylton | Hylton Motorsports | Pontiac | 27.075 | 135.224 |
Provisionals
| 39 | 28 | Davey Allison | Robert Yates Racing | Ford | - | - |
| 40 | 71 | Dave Marcis | Marcis Auto Racing | Chevrolet | - | - |
Failed to qualify
| 41 | 49 | Stanley Smith | BS&S Motorsports | Chevrolet | -* | -* |
Official starting lineup

== Race results ==
| Fin | St | # | Driver | Team | Make | Laps | Led | Status | Pts | Winnings |
|---|---|---|---|---|---|---|---|---|---|---|
| 1 | 10 | 2 | Rusty Wallace | Penske Racing South | Pontiac | 492 | 203 | running | 185 | $42,735 |
| 2 | 7 | 3 | Dale Earnhardt | Richard Childress Racing | Chevrolet | 492 | 133 | running | 175 | $47,585 |
| 3 | 2 | 4 | Ernie Irvan | Morgan–McClure Motorsports | Chevrolet | 492 | 80 | running | 170 | $33,785 |
| 4 | 20 | 7 | Alan Kulwicki | AK Racing | Ford | 492 | 2 | running | 165 | $28,085 |
| 5 | 1 | 6 | Mark Martin | Roush Racing | Ford | 492 | 55 | running | 160 | $29,160 |
| 6 | 22 | 18 | Dale Jarrett | Joe Gibbs Racing | Chevrolet | 492 | 0 | running | 150 | $21,885 |
| 7 | 5 | 55 | Ted Musgrave | RaDiUs Motorsports | Ford | 492 | 4 | running | 151 | $17,635 |
| 8 | 17 | 41 | Phil Parsons | Larry Hedrick Motorsports | Chevrolet | 492 | 0 | running | 142 | $14,135 |
| 9 | 14 | 15 | Geoff Bodine | Bud Moore Engineering | Ford | 491 | 2 | running | 143 | $18,925 |
| 10 | 21 | 14 | Terry Labonte | Hagan Racing | Chevrolet | 491 | 0 | running | 134 | $18,535 |
| 11 | 3 | 11 | Bill Elliott | Junior Johnson & Associates | Ford | 491 | 0 | running | 130 | $20,535 |
| 12 | 12 | 5 | Ricky Rudd | Hendrick Motorsports | Chevrolet | 490 | 0 | running | 127 | $15,735 |
| 13 | 8 | 27 | Hut Stricklin | Junior Johnson & Associates | Ford | 490 | 0 | running | 124 | $15,435 |
| 14 | 39 | 28 | Davey Allison | Robert Yates Racing | Ford | 490 | 0 | running | 121 | $19,535 |
| 15 | 23 | 68 | Bobby Hamilton | TriStar Motorsports | Ford | 489 | 0 | running | 118 | $12,085 |
| 16 | 25 | 12 | Jimmy Spencer | Bobby Allison Motorsports | Ford | 489 | 0 | running | 115 | $14,335 |
| 17 | 15 | 44 | Rick Wilson | Petty Enterprises | Pontiac | 489 | 0 | running | 112 | $10,935 |
| 18 | 9 | 98 | Derrike Cope | Cale Yarborough Motorsports | Ford | 486 | 0 | running | 109 | $13,635 |
| 19 | 18 | 90 | Bobby Hillin Jr. | Donlavey Racing | Ford | 486 | 0 | running | 106 | $8,485 |
| 20 | 29 | 16 | Wally Dallenbach Jr. | Roush Racing | Ford | 485 | 0 | running | 103 | $13,585 |
| 21 | 40 | 71 | Dave Marcis | Marcis Auto Racing | Chevrolet | 484 | 0 | running | 100 | $9,835 |
| 22 | 6 | 26 | Brett Bodine | King Racing | Ford | 481 | 0 | running | 97 | $12,635 |
| 23 | 32 | 40 | Kenny Wallace (R) | SABCO Racing | Pontiac | 481 | 0 | running | 94 | $8,835 |
| 24 | 13 | 25 | Ken Schrader | Hendrick Motorsports | Chevrolet | 479 | 0 | running | 91 | $12,335 |
| 25 | 34 | 52 | Jimmy Hensley | Jimmy Means Racing | Ford | 479 | 0 | running | 88 | $7,635 |
| 26 | 30 | 30 | Michael Waltrip | Bahari Racing | Pontiac | 478 | 0 | running | 85 | $12,100 |
| 27 | 33 | 05 | Ed Ferree | Ferree Racing | Chevrolet | 475 | 0 | running | 82 | $7,425 |
| 28 | 19 | 8 | Sterling Marlin | Stavola Brothers Racing | Ford | 473 | 0 | cylinder | 79 | $11,925 |
| 29 | 31 | 75 | Dick Trickle | Butch Mock Motorsports | Ford | 467 | 0 | running | 76 | $7,200 |
| 30 | 27 | 17 | Darrell Waltrip | Darrell Waltrip Motorsports | Chevrolet | 461 | 3 | running | 78 | $16,950 |
| 31 | 26 | 33 | Harry Gant | Leo Jackson Motorsports | Chevrolet | 457 | 10 | oil pump | 75 | $17,450 |
| 32 | 11 | 42 | Kyle Petty | SABCO Racing | Pontiac | 436 | 0 | running | 67 | $14,900 |
| 33 | 24 | 22 | Bobby Labonte (R) | Bill Davis Racing | Ford | 422 | 0 | crash | 64 | $7,250 |
| 34 | 28 | 24 | Jeff Gordon (R) | Hendrick Motorsports | Chevrolet | 402 | 0 | engine | 61 | $6,700 |
| 35 | 16 | 21 | Morgan Shepherd | Wood Brothers Racing | Ford | 386 | 0 | running | 58 | $11,125 |
| 36 | 35 | 64 | Johnny Chapman | Bahre Racing | Pontiac | 368 | 0 | handling | 55 | $6,526 |
| 37 | 36 | 77 | Mike Potter | Gray Racing | Ford | 232 | 0 | crash | 52 | $6,475 |
| 38 | 37 | 56 | Jerry Hill | Hill Motorsports | Chevrolet | 215 | 0 | crash | 49 | $6,460 |
| 39 | 4 | 1 | Rick Mast | Precision Products Racing | Ford | 176 | 0 | head gasket | 46 | $10,925 |
| 40 | 38 | 48 | James Hylton | Hylton Motorsports | Pontiac | 24 | 0 | oil pan | 43 | $6,400 |
Official race results

== Standings after the race ==
Drivers' Championship standings

| | Pos | Driver | Points |
|---|---|---|---|
| 1 | 1 | Dale Earnhardt | 355 |
| 1 | 2 | Dale Jarrett | 330 (-25) |
| | 3 | Geoff Bodine | 313 (-42) |
| 2 | 4 | Mark Martin | 310 (–45) |
| 1 | 5 | Hut Stricklin | 289 (–66) |
| 9 | 6 | Ted Musgrave | 269 (–86) |
| 4 | 7 | Terry Labonte | 264 (–91) |
| 24 | 8 | Rusty Wallace | 252 (–103) |
| 17 | 9 | Alan Kulwicki | 250 (–105) |
| 12 | 10 | Phil Parsons | 239 (–116) |
Official driver's standings

- Note: Only the first 10 positions are included for the driver standings.

| Previous race: 1993 Daytona 500 | NASCAR Winston Cup Series; 1993 season | Next race: 1993 Pontiac Excitement 400 |
