= Specialty Racing =

Former NASCAR team

Specialty Racing LLC
- Owner(s): Doug Taylor and Charles Shoffner
- Base: Statesville, North Carolina
- Series: Nationwide Series
- Race drivers: 61. Matt Carter; Brandon Whitt; Kevin Lepage; Josh Wise
- Opened: 1994
- Closed: 2010

Specialty Racing, LLC was an auto racing team that competed in the NASCAR Nationwide Series. Based in Statesville, North Carolina, it was owned by Doug Taylor and Charles Shoffner. In 2011, Specialty Racing planned to field the No. 61 Ford Mustang, but sponsorship was not found, and the team closed.

== Team history to 1990s ==
Team owner Doug Taylor's first race as an owner came in 1994 at Dover when Patty Moise drove the No. 40 Dial/Purex Ford to a 19th-place finish. The team would run five more races that season achieving a season best 12th place at Michigan in just their third race. In 1995 Specialty/Doug Taylor Motorsports would continue to build in the foundation laid the previous year by racing in 22 races with Moise behind the wheel for all of them. The highlights of the season came at the Red Dog 300 in Charlotte when the team earned its first top-ten stating spot as it qualified eighth and finished the race 18th. Another milestone came at the Humminbird Fishfinder 500K at Talladega when Moise drove the car to its first top-ten finish, a seventh place showing.

Moise was released as the team's driver at the end of the 1995 season and Tim Fedewa was hired to serve as driver for the 1996 campaign. Kleenex signed on to sponsor the Number 40. Fedewa drove the car to five top-ten starts and two top-ten finishes, with a season-best 4th-place finish in Indianapolis at the Kroger 200. The finish at IRP would mark the team's first top-five finish. In 1997, a total of seven drivers sat in the seat of the car, including Doug Taylor himself for the March Las Vegas race. The best finish for the year was put forth when Ted Musgrave drove to a 12th-place finish at Darlington.

1998 was the last year of Doug Taylor Motorsports. The team raced in 31 out of 32 races with Kerry Earnhardt, Rick Fuller, Jack Sprague, Taylor and Lepage sharing driving duties. Lepage drove the car in 24 of the races. Full-time sponsorship was provided by Channellock and manufacturers were switched from Ford to Chevrolet. The team earned its first pole award with Lepage driving at the MBNA Platinum 200 at Dover. Also, it posted ten top-ten finishes, six top-five finishes and the highlight of the season at the Food City 250 in Bristol when Kevin Lepage led 13 laps and came away with Doug Taylor Motorsports' first victory. At the end of the season, the team was bought out by Galaxy Motorsports.

=== Car No. 04 results ===
| Year | Driver | No. | Make | 1 | 2 | 3 | 4 | 5 | 6 | 7 | 8 | 9 | 10 | 11 | 12 | 13 | 14 | 15 | 16 | 17 | 18 | 19 | 20 | 21 | 22 | 23 | 24 | 25 | 26 | 27 | 28 | 29 | 30 | 31 | Owners | Pts |
|---|---|---|---|---|---|---|---|---|---|---|---|---|---|---|---|---|---|---|---|---|---|---|---|---|---|---|---|---|---|---|---|---|---|---|---|---|
| 1997 | Doug Taylor | 0 | Ford | DAY | CAR | RCH | ATL | LVS; 41 | DAR | HCY | TEX | BRI | NSV | TAL | NHA | NZH | CLT | DOV | SBO | GLN | MLW | MYB | GTY | IRP | MCH | BRI | DAR | RCH | DOV | CLT | CAL | CAR | HOM | | | |
| 1998 | Rick Fuller | 04 | Chevy | DAY | CAR | LVS; DNQ | NSV | DAR | BRI | TEX | HCY | TAL | NHA | NZH | CLT | DOV | RCH | | | | | | | | | | | | | | | | | | | |
| 1998 | Doug Taylor | 04 | Chevy | | | | | | | | | | | | | | | PPR; 41 | GLN | MLW | MYB | CAL | SBO | IRP | MCH | BRI | DAR | RCH | DOV | | | | | | | |
| 1998 | Kerry Earnhardt | 04 | Chevy | | | | | | | | | | | | | | | | | | | | | | | | | | | CLT; DNQ | GTY | CAR | ATL | HOM | | |

=== Car No. 40 results ===
| Year | Driver | No. | Make | 1 | 2 | 3 | 4 | 5 | 6 | 7 | 8 | 9 | 10 | 11 | 12 | 13 | 14 | 15 | 16 | 17 | 18 | 19 | 20 | 21 | 22 | 23 | 24 | 25 | 26 | 27 | 28 | 29 | 30 | 31 | Owners | Pts |
|---|---|---|---|---|---|---|---|---|---|---|---|---|---|---|---|---|---|---|---|---|---|---|---|---|---|---|---|---|---|---|---|---|---|---|---|---|
| 1994 | Patty Moise | 40 | Ford | DAY; DNQ | CAR | RCH | ATL | MAR | DAR | HCY | BRI | ROU | NHA | | CLT; DNQ | DOV; 19 | | | | | | | | MCH; 12 | | | | DOV; 42 | CLT; DNQ | MAR | CAR | | | | | |
| 1994 | Patty Moise | 40 | Chevy | | | | | | | | | | | | | | | GLN; 20 | MLW | SBO | | | | | | | RCH; 25 | | | | | | | | | |
| 1994 | Patty Moise | 40 | Pontiac | | | | | | | | | | | | | | | | | | TAL; DNQ | HCY | | | BRI; 24 | DAR | | | | | | | | | | |
| 1994 | Dale Williams | 40 | Chevy | | | | | | | | | | | NZH; 22 | | | MYB; 25 | | | | | | IRP; DNQ | | | | | | | | | | | | | |
| 1995 | Patty Moise | 40 | Ford | DAY; 42 | CAR; 14 | RCH; 23 | ATL; 24 | NSV; 28 | DAR; 30 | BRI; 22 | HCY; DNQ | NHA; DNQ | NZH; 24 | CLT; 18 | DOV; 42 | MYB; 22 | GLN; 38 | MLW; 37 | TAL; 7 | SBO; 27 | IRP; 22 | MCH; 27 | BRI; 31 | DAR; 13 | RCH; DNQ | DOV; 24 | CLT; DNQ | CAR; 23 | HOM; DNQ | | | | | | | |
| 1996 | Tim Fedewa | 40 | Ford | DAY; DNQ | CAR; 25 | RCH; 27 | ATL; 22 | NSV; 25 | DAR; 28 | BRI; 26 | HCY; 12 | NZH; 8 | CLT; 17 | DOV; 39 | SBO; 16 | MYB; 20 | GLN; 18 | MLW; 26 | NHA; 38 | TAL; 15 | IRP; 4 | MCH; 40 | BRI; 21 | DAR; 42 | RCH; 41 | DOV; 21 | CLT; 17 | CAR; 19 | HOM; 23 | | | | | | | |
| 1997 | Doug Heveron | 40 | Ford | DAY; 21 | CAR; 22 | RCH; 24 | ATL; DNQ | | | | | | | | | | | | | | | | | | | | | | | | | | | | | |
| 1997 | Jerry Robertson | 40 | Ford | | | | | LVS; 22 | | HCY; 29 | TEX; 31 | | | TAL; DNQ | NHA | NZH | CLT | DOV | SBO | GLN | | | | | | | | | | | | | | | | |
| 1997 | Ted Musgrave | 40 | Ford | | | | | | DAR; 12 | | | | | | | | | | | | | | | | | | | | | | | | | | | |
| 1997 | Curtis Markham | 40 | Ford | | | | | | | | | BRI; 42 | NSV | | | | | | | | | | | | | | | | | | | | | | | |
| 1997 | Rick Fuller | 40 | Ford | | | | | | | | | | | | | | | | | | MLW; 22 | MYB | GTY | IRP; 38 | | | | | | | | | | | | |
| 1997 | Rick Fuller | 40 | Chevy | | | | | | | | | | | | | | | | | | | | | | | | | | | | | | HOM; DNQ | | | |
| 1997 | David Bonnett | 40 | Ford | | | | | | | | | | | | | | | | | | | | | | MCH; 39 | BRI | DAR | RCH | DOV | CLT | CAL | | | | | |
| 1997 | Jeff Fuller | 40 | Chevy | | | | | | | | | | | | | | | | | | | | | | | | | | | | | CAR; 40 | | | | |
| 1998 | Rick Fuller | 40 | Chevy | DAY; 27 | CAR; DNQ | | | | | | | | | | | | | | | | | | | | | | | | | | | | | | | |
| 1998 | Kevin Lepage | 40 | Chevy | | | LVS; 13 | NSV; 29 | DAR; 21 | BRI; 14 | TEX; 40 | HCY; DNQ | TAL; 16 | NHA; 3 | NZH; 14 | CLT; 23 | DOV; 13 | RCH; 7 | | | MLW; 18 | | CAL; 2 | | IRP; 20 | MCH; 4 | BRI; 1 | DAR; 4 | RCH; 7 | DOV; 13 | CLT; 7 | | CAR; 2 | ATL; 25 | HOM; 20 | | |
| 1998 | Stanton Barrett | 40 | Chevy | | | | | | | | | | | | | | | PPR; 31 | | | | | | | | | | | | | | | | | | |
| 1998 | Jack Sprague | 40 | Chevy | | | | | | | | | | | | | | | | GLN; 6 | | | | | | | | | | | | | | | | | |
| 1998 | Kerry Earnhardt | 40 | Chevy | | | | | | | | | | | | | | | | | | MYB; 23 | | SBO; 26 | | | | | | | | GTY; 39 | | | | | |

== Current team history ==
Specialty Racing returned to the NASCAR Busch Series on October 27, 2007 at the Sam's Town 250, Memphis Motorsports Park. The driver of the car, Matt Carter, drove to a 39th-place finish. The team then signed Lepage, and made plans to run the entire 2008 Nationwide Series Schedule. After failing to qualify for the opening race of the season, the Camping World 300 at Daytona International Speedway the team qualified for every race for the rest of the season. Specialty posted two top twenty finishes with a 17th-place finish in the Sam's Town 300 and an 18th-place finish in the Sharpie Mini 300. Matt Carter returned to the team in 2009 and gave the team two top-20s at Bristol and Daytona, enough to lock the team into the top-30 in owners points for 2010. That year, Carter was released and was replaced by Josh Wise. Wise would run with the team until May, when a handful of drivers, including Carter, J. J. Yeley, Chase Miller, and Pierre Bourque took over the reins of the No. 61. The team cut back to a limited schedule due to a lack of funds.

=== Car No. 61 results ===
| Year | Driver | No. | Make | 1 | 2 | 3 | 4 | 5 | 6 | 7 | 8 | 9 | 10 | 11 | 12 | 13 | 14 | 15 | 16 | 17 | 18 | 19 | 20 | 21 | 22 | 23 | 24 | 25 | 26 | 27 | 28 | 29 | 30 | 31 | 32 | 33 | 34 | 35 | Owners | Pts |
|---|---|---|---|---|---|---|---|---|---|---|---|---|---|---|---|---|---|---|---|---|---|---|---|---|---|---|---|---|---|---|---|---|---|---|---|---|---|---|---|---|
| 2007 | Matt Carter | 40 | Ford | DAY | CAL | MXC | LVS | ATL | BRI | NSH | TEX | PHO | TAL | RCH | DAR | CLT | DOV | NSH | KEN | MLW | NHA | DAY | CHI | GTY | IRP | CGV | GLN | MCH | BRI | CAL | RCH | DOV | KAN | CLT | MEM; 39 | TEX | PHO | HOM | 80th | 46 |
| 2008 | Kevin Lepage | 61 | Ford | DAY; DNQ | CAL; 23 | LVS; 17 | ATL; 27 | BRI; 18 | NSH; 29 | TEX; 31 | PHO; 28 | MXC; 24 | TAL; 35 | RCH; 29 | DAR; 26 | CLT; 26 | DOV; 35 | NSH; 29 | KEN; 24 | MLW; 26 | NHA; 24 | DAY; 24 | | | | | | | | | | | | | | | | | 29th | 2638 |
| 2008 | Brandon Whitt | 61 | Ford | | | | | | | | | | | | | | | | | | | | CHI; 41 | GTY; 28 | IRP; 35 | CGV | GLN | MCH; 32 | BRI; 33 | CAL; 25 | RCH; 28 | DOV; 23 | KAN; 27 | CLT; 21 | MEM; 28 | TEX; 40 | PHO; 30 | HOM; 38 | 29th | 2638 |
| 2009 | Brandon Whitt | 61 | Ford | DAY; 37 | CAL; 23 | LVS; 24 | BRI; 24 | TEX; 23 | NSH; 30 | PHO; 26 | TAL; 30 | RCH; 30 | DAR; 25 | CLT; 29 | DOV; 20 | NSH; 20 | KEN; 24 | MLW; 30 | | | | | | | | | | | | | | | | | | | | | 29th | 2855 |
| 2009 | Matt Carter | 61 | Ford | | | | | | | | | | | | | | | | NHA; 24 | DAY; 15 | CHI; 32 | GTY; 19 | IRP; 30 | IOW; 21 | GLN; 36 | MCH; 26 | BRI; 12 | | ATL; 25 | RCH; 33 | DOV; 26 | KAN; 27 | CAL; 25 | CLT; 29 | | | | | 29th | 2855 |
| 2009 | D. J. Kennington | 61 | Ford | | | | | | | | | | | | | | | | | | | | | | | | | CGV; 32 | | | | | | | | | | | 29th | 2855 |
| 2009 | Kenny Hendrick | 61 | Ford | | | | | | | | | | | | | | | | | | | | | | | | | | | | | | | | MEM; 37 | TEX; 37 | | HOM; 38 | 29th | 2855 |
| 2009 | Jason Bowles | 61 | Ford | | | | | | | | | | | | | | | | | | | | | | | | | | | | | | | | | | PHO; 31 | | 29th | 2855 |
| 2010 | Josh Wise | 61 | Ford | DAY; 39 | CAL; 37 | LVS; 19 | BRI; 23 | NSH; 20 | PHO; 24 | TEX; DNQ | TAL; DNQ | RCH; 37 | DAR; 34 | DOV; 36 | CLT; 42 | | | ROA; 41 | NHA; 41 | DAY | CHI | GTY | IRP | IOW | | | | | | | | | | | | | | | 44th | 985 |
| 2010 | Matt Carter | 61 | Ford | | | | | | | | | | | | | NSH; 42 | KEN; 42 | | | | | | | | | | | | | | | | | | | | | | 44th | 985 |
| 2010 | Chase Miller | 61 | Ford | | | | | | | | | | | | | | | | | | | | | | GLN; 39 | MCH | | | | | | | | | | | | | 44th | 985 |
| 2010 | J. J. Yeley | 61 | Ford | | | | | | | | | | | | | | | | | | | | | | | | BRI; DNQ | | | | | | | | | | | | 44th | 985 |
| 2010 | Pierre Bourque | 61 | Ford | | | | | | | | | | | | | | | | | | | | | | | | | CGV; DNQ | ATL | RCH | DOV | KAN | CAL | CLT | GTY | TEX | PHO | HOM | 44th | 985 |

=== Car No. 62 results ===
| Year | Driver | No. | Make | 1 | 2 | 3 | 4 | 5 | 6 | 7 | 8 | 9 | 10 | 11 | 12 | 13 | 14 | 15 | 16 | 17 | 18 | 19 | 20 | 21 | 22 | 23 | 24 | 25 | 26 | 27 | 28 | 29 | 30 | 31 | 32 | 33 | 34 | 35 | Owners | Pts |
|---|---|---|---|---|---|---|---|---|---|---|---|---|---|---|---|---|---|---|---|---|---|---|---|---|---|---|---|---|---|---|---|---|---|---|---|---|---|---|---|---|
| 2008 | Brandon Whitt | 62 | Ford | DAY | CAL | LVS | ATL | BRI | NSH | TEX | PHO | MXC | TAL | RCH | DAR | CLT | DOV | NSH | KEN | MLW | NHA | DAY | CHI | GTY | IRP | CGV; 38 | GLN; 40 | MCH | BRI | CAL | RCH | DOV | KAN | CLT | MEM | TEX | PHO | HOM | 77th | 92 |
