= Toby Tobias Jr. =

American racing driver

- Born: Richard Tobias Jr. June 16, 1966 (age 60) Lebanon, Pennsylvania, U.S.

Championship titles
- 1994 New York State Fair Champion

NASCAR O'Reilly Auto Parts Series career
- 3 races run over 2 years
- 1995 position: 87th
- Best finish: 87th (2016)
- First race: 1994 SplitFire 200 (Dover)
- Last race: 1995 MBNA 200 (Dover)
Wins	Top tens	Poles
0	0	0

ARCA Menards Series East career
- 2 races run over 1 year
Wins	Top tens	Poles
0	0	0
- Statistics up to date as of September 12, 2020.

Richard "Toby" Tobias Jr. (born June 16, 1966) is an American racing driver and chassis builder. He has competed in the United States Auto Club and NASCAR national series.

== Racing career ==
Tobias began racing modifieds in his late teens on the short tracks of Central Pennsylvania, including Big Diamond, Nazareth, Williams Grove and Grandview Speedways. In the mid-1990s, Tobias competed in the NASCAR Busch Series and NASCAR Busch North Series, yet also won a number of high-level dirt races in New York and Pennsylvania. In 1999, he began racing with the USAC Silver Crown Series, eventually appearing in 73 events over his career and claiming a win at Illinois State Fairgrounds in Du Quoin.

== Speedway Entertainment ==
Tobias also maintained the family business, Tobias Speed Equipment Inc., and in 1999 developed the Slingshot cars for use at local dirt tracks. In 2002, production of the Slingshot was transferred to a separate company, Speedway Entertainment, and in 2008 the SpeedSTR was introduced.

The Slingshot is a four-coil vehicle with a 58-inch wheelbase, designed to look like a northeast dirt modified and powered by a 600cc Briggs & Stratton Vanguard engine capable of speeds near 100 MPH.

The SpeedSTR is a 1,250-pound open wheel car with a 72-inch wheelbase—essentially a self-starting Midget. Originally powered by a 250 horsepower Dodge Neon engine, the division has transitioned to the K20 C1 Honda Turbo.

== Action Track USA ==
In 2013, Tobias and former racer Doug Rose acquired the quarter-mile clay raceway in Kutztown, Pennsylvania, from the Meitzler family and gave the raceway a new name: Action Track USA. The track features the SpeedSTR, wingless 600cc micro sprints, 270 micro sprints and Slingshots during the racing season.

== Personal life ==
Tobias is the son of the former NASCAR driver Toby Tobias Sr. Tobias Jr. followed his father, brothers Ronnie and Scott, and brother-in-law Paul Lotier into racing. Tobias Sr. was fatally injured in a USAC sprint car race, Scott and Paul were severely and permanently injured in racing accidents, and Ronnie died of a heart attack while racing. Nephew Paul Lotier Jr. later became the third generation involved in racing as co-owner of a sprint car.

In 2017, Tobias was honored by the Northeast Dirt Modified Hall of Fame for his engineering and car building leadership.

== Motorsports career results ==
=== NASCAR ===
(key) (Bold – Pole position awarded by qualifying time. Italics – Pole position earned by points standings or practice time. * – Most laps led.)

==== Busch Series ====
NASCAR Busch Series results
Year	Team	No.	Make	1	2	3	4	5	6	7	8	9	10	11	12	13	14	15	16	17	18	19	20	21	22	23	24	25	26	27	28	NBSC	Pts	Ref
1994		50	Ford	DAY	CAR	RCH	ATL	MAR	DAR	HCY	BRI	ROU	NHA	NZH; DNQ	CLT	DOV	MYB	GLN	MLW; DNQ	SBO	TAL	HCY	IRP	MCH	BRI	DAR	RCH	DOV; 38	CLT	MAR	CAR	102nd	49	
1995	Tobias Racing	58	Ford	DAY	CAR	RCH	ATL	NSV	DAR	BRI	HCY	NHA	NZH	CLT	DOV; 40	MYB	GLN	MLW	TAL	SBO	IRP	MCH	BRI	DAR	RCH	DOV; 32	CLT	CAR	HOM			87th	110	

==== Busch North Series ====
NASCAR Busch North Series results
Year	Team	No.	Make	1	2	3	4	5	6	7	8	9	10	11	12	13	14	15	16	17	18	19	20	BNSC	Pts	Ref
1994	Tobias Racing	50	Ford	NHA; 21	NHA	MND	NAZ; DNQ	APL	HOL	GLN	JEN	EPP	GLN	NHA	WSC	STA	TMP	MND	WMT	RPK	LEE	NHA	LRK	66th	139	
