= George Crenshaw (racing driver) =

American racing driver (born 1960)

- Born: March 22, 1960 (age 66); Lakeland, Florida, U.S.

NASCAR O'Reilly Auto Parts Series career
- 5 races run over 3 years
- Best finish: 69th (1994)
- First race: 1992 Roses Stores 300 (Rougemont)
- Last race: 1994 SplitFire 200 (Dover)
Wins	Top tens	Poles
0	0	0
- Statistics up to date as of January 4, 2025.

George Crenshaw (born March 22, 1960) is an American former professional stock car racing driver who has competed in the NASCAR Busch Series and the NASCAR Goody's Dash Series.

Crenshaw has also competed in the ASA Southeast Asphalt Tour and the SARA Late Model Series.

== Motorsports results ==
=== NASCAR ===
(key) (Bold - Pole position awarded by qualifying time. Italics - Pole position earned by points standings or practice time. * – Most laps led.)

==== Busch Series ====
NASCAR Busch Series results
Year	Team	No.	Make	1	2	3	4	5	6	7	8	9	10	11	12	13	14	15	16	17	18	19	20	21	22	23	24	25	26	27	28	29	30	31	NBSC	Pts	Ref
1992	Crenshaw Racing	07	Chevy	DAY	CAR	RCH	ATL	MAR	DAR	BRI	HCY	LAN	DUB	NZH	CLT	DOV	ROU; 18	MYB	GLN	VOL	NHA	TAL	IRP	ROU	MCH	NHA	BRI	DAR	RCH	DOV	CLT	MAR	CAR	HCY	99th	109	
1993	Crenshaw Racing	07	Chevy	DAY	CAR	RCH	DAR	BRI	HCY	ROU	MAR	NZH	CLT	DOV	MYB	GLN	MLW	TAL	IRP	MCH	NHA	BRI	DAR	RCH	DOV	ROU	CLT; DNQ	MAR; DNQ	CAR	HCY; 20	ATL				90th	103	
1994	Crenshaw Racing	07	Chevy	DAY; DNQ	CAR	RCH; DNQ	ATL	MAR; 30	DAR	HCY; DNQ	BRI	ROU; 21	NHA	NZH	CLT; DNQ	DOV	MYB; DNQ	GLN	MLW	SBO; DNQ	TAL	HCY; DNQ	IRP	MCH	BRI	DAR	RCH	DOV; 36	CLT; DNQ	MAR	CAR				69th	228	
