= David Bonnett =

American racing driver

- Born: August 24, 1964 (age 62); Bessemer, Alabama, U.S.

NASCAR O'Reilly Auto Parts Series career
- 19 races run over 6 years
- 1997 position: 113th
- Best finish: 55th (1995)
- First race: 1992 X-1R Firecracker 200 (Volusia)
- Last race: 1997 Detroit Gasket 200 (Michigan)
Wins	Top tens	Poles
0	1	0

David Bonnett (born August 24, 1964) is an American former professional stock car racing driver. He last raced in the NASCAR Busch Series. He is the son of the late Neil Bonnett.

== Motorsports Career Results ==
=== Busch Grand National Series ===
NASCAR Busch Grand National Series results
Year	Team	No.	Make	1	2	3	4	5	6	7	8	9	10	11	12	13	14	15	16	17	18	19	20	21	22	23	24	25	26	27	28	29	30	31	NBGNSC	Pts	Ref
1992	Dale Earnhardt Inc.	3	Chevrolet	DAY	CAR	RCH	ATL	MAR	DAR	BRI	HCY	LAN	DUB	NZH	CLT	DOV	ROU	MYB	GLN	VOL; 9	NHA	TAL	IRP	ROU	MCH	NHA	BRI	DAR	RCH	DOV	CLT	MAR			76th	196	
1992	Dale Earnhardt Inc.	2	Chevrolet																														CAR; 35	HCY	76th	196	
1993	Bonnett Racing	12	Chevrolet	DAY	CAR	RCH	DAR	BRI	HCY	ROU	MAR; 21	NZH	CLT	DOV	MYB; 20	GLN	MLW	TAL	IRP	MCH; 17	NHA	BRI	DAR	RCH; DNQ	DOV	ROU	CLT	MAR; DNQ	CAR; 39	HCY; DNQ	ATL				57th	361	
1994	Bonnett Racing	12	Chevrolet	DAY	CAR; 18	RCH; DNQ	ATL	MAR	DAR	HCY	BRI	ROU	NHA	NZH																					62nd	358	
1994	Hank Parker Racing	03	Chevrolet												CLT; DNQ	DOV	MYB	GLN	MLW	SBO	TAL	HCY	IRP	MCH; 22	BRI	DAR	RCH; DNQ	DOV	CLT; 39	MAR	CAR; 19				62nd	358	
1995	Hank Parker Racing	03	Chevrolet	DAY; DNQ	CAR; 17	RCH	ATL	NSV	DAR	BRI	HCY	NHA	NZH	CLT; 43	DOV; 37	MYB	GLN	MLW	TAL; 27	SBO	IRP	MCH; 18	BRI	DAR	RCH	DOV	CLT; 40	CAR; DNQ	HOM						55th	432	
1996	Hank Parker Racing	03	Chevrolet	DAY; 17	CAR; DNQ	RCH	ATL	NSV	DAR	BRI	HCY	NZH	CLT; 38	DOV	SBO	MYB	GLN	MLW	NHA	TAL	IRP	MCH	BRI	DAR	RCH	DOV									73rd	161	
1996	Taylor Motorsports	65	Chevrolet																								CLT; DNQ	CAR; DNQ	HOM						73rd	161	
1997	Taylor Motorsports	40	Chevrolet	DAY	CAR	RCH	ATL	LVS	DAR	HCY	TEX	BRI	NSV	TAL	NHA	NZH	CLT	DOV	SBO	GLN	MLW	MYB	GTY	IRP	MCH; 39	BRI	DAR	RCH	DOV	CLT	CAL	CAR	HOM		113th	46	
