= 1994 NASCAR Busch Series =

American motorsport season

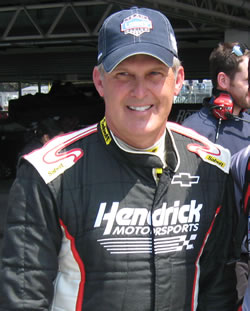
David Green, the 1994 Busch Series champion

The 1994 NASCAR Busch Series began February 19 and ended October 22. David Green of Labonte Motorsports won the championship.

== Teams and drivers ==
=== Complete schedule ===
Manufacturer	Team	No.	Driver(s)	Listed owner(s)
Chevrolet	Alliance Motorsports	59	Dennis Setzer (R)	Daniel Welch
Chevrolet	BACE Motorsports	74	Johnny Benson Jr. (R)	Bill Baumgardner
Chevrolet	Beverly Racing	25	Hermie Sadler	Don Beverly
Chevrolet	D-R Racing	08	Bobby Dotter	Ed Reizen
Chevrolet	Hensley Motorsports	63	Jim Bown	Hubert Hensley
Chevrolet	J&J Racing	99	Robert Pressley 21	Bill Papke
Chevrolet	J&J Racing	99	Phil Parsons 4	Bill Papke
Chevrolet	J&J Racing	99	Bobby Hillin Jr. 3	Bill Papke
Chevrolet	Labonte Motorsports	44	David Green	Bob Labonte
Chevrolet	Martin Racing	92	Larry Pearson	Mac Martin
Chevrolet	Moroso Racing	20	Randy LaJoie 27	Dick Moroso
Chevrolet	Moroso Racing	20	Jimmy Hensley 1	Dick Moroso
Chevrolet	Parker Racing	72	Tracy Leslie	Ron Parker
Chevrolet	Team 34	34	Mike McLaughlin	Frank Cicci
Chevrolet	Ricky Craven Motorsports	2	Ricky Craven	Ricky Craven
Ford	FILMAR Racing	8	Kenny Wallace	Filbert Marcotti
Ford	Mark Rypien Motorsports	23	Chad Little	Mark Rypien
Ford	RaDiUs Motorsports	55	Tim Fedewa	Ray DeWitt
Chevrolet Ford	KEL Racing	57	Jason Keller	Joe Keller

=== Part-time schedule ===
Manufacturer	Teams	No.	Driver(s)	Listed owner(s)	Rounds
Buick	Stub Fadden	16	Stub Fadden	Stub Fadden	1
Buick	Unknown	95	Jay Fogleman		1
Chevrolet	American Equipment Racing	95	Jack Baldwin	Buz McCall	2
Chevrolet	Barry Bostick	41	Barry Bostick	Barry Bostick	4
Chevrolet	Brian Ross	73	Brian Ross	Brian Ross	2
Chevrolet	Brown Racing	06	Clay Brown	Clay Brown	5
Chevrolet	Brown Racing	51	Clay Brown	Clay Brown	1
Chevrolet	Greci Motorsports	51	Andy Santerre	Mike Greci	1
Chevrolet	Greci Motorsports	51	Tom Peck	Mike Greci	1
Chevrolet	Phoenix Racing	51	Jeff Purvis	James Finch	6
Chevrolet	Buttke Racing	66	Nathan Buttke	Arlin Buttke	7
Chevrolet	Charles Powell	84	Robert Powell	Charles Powell	1
Chevrolet	DAJ Racing	32	Dale Jarrett	Dale Jarrett	12
Chevrolet	Dale Earnhardt, Inc.	3	Dale Earnhardt	Dale Earnhardt, Inc.	13
Chevrolet	Dale Earnhardt, Inc.	3	Michael Waltrip	Dale Earnhardt, Inc.	2
Chevrolet	Dale Earnhardt, Inc.	3	Andy Petree	Dale Earnhardt, Inc.	1
Chevrolet	Brevak Racing	3	Bob Brevak	Bob Brevak	1
Chevrolet	Davison Motorsports	76	Pat Davison	Pat Davison	3
Chevrolet	Davison Motorsports	76	Jeff Green	Pat Davison	2
Chevrolet	Edward Bolles	76	Tom Bolles	Edward Bolles	1
Chevrolet	Day Enterprises	16	Chad Chaffin (R)	Wayne Day	14
Chevrolet	Day Enterprises	16	Clay Brown	Wayne Day	1
Chevrolet	Ferree Racing	46	Shawna Robinson	Ed Ferree	14
Chevrolet	Ferree Racing	46	Ed Ferree	Ed Ferree	1
Chevrolet	Ferree Racing	46	John Alexander	Ed Ferree	2
Chevrolet	Ferree Racing	46	Robert Pressley	Ed Ferree	1
Chevrolet	Fast Track Racing Enterprises	42	Andy Hillenburg	Andy Hillenburg	7
Chevrolet	Fred Turner Racing	4	Sterling Marlin	Fred Turner	9
Chevrolet	Fred Turner Racing	4	Hermie Sadler	Fred Turner	1
Chevrolet	Mountain Racing	4	Jamie Aube	Allen Avery	1
Chevrolet	Tom Milner	4	Johnny Smith	Tom Milner	2
Chevrolet	Gene Petty Motorsports	88	Mike Skinner	Gene Petty	7
Chevrolet	Gene Petty Motorsports	88	David Hyder	Gene Petty	1
Chevrolet	Gene Petty Motorsports	88	Rich Bickle	Gene Petty	1
Chevrolet	George Crenshaw	07	George Crenshaw	George Crenshaw	11
Chevrolet	Greg Clark	53	Greg Clark	Greg Clark	3
Chevrolet	Grissom Racing Enterprises	31	Tom Peck	Wayne Grissom	8
Chevrolet	Grissom Racing Enterprises	31	Steve Grissom	Wayne Grissom	11
Chevrolet	Hank Parker Racing	03	Hank Parker	Hank Parker	2
Chevrolet	Hank Parker Racing	03	David Bonnett	Hank Parker	5
Chevrolet	Ingram Racing	10	Jack Sprague	Jack Ingram	1
Chevrolet	Jeff Barry	22	Jeff Barry	Jeff Barry	2
Chevrolet	Johnny Rumley	00	Johnny Rumley	Johnny Rumley	4
Chevrolet	Junior Franks	54	Junior Franks	Junior Franks	1
Chevrolet	Ken Schrader Racing	52	Ken Schrader	Ken Schrader	12
Chevrolet	Kermit McGee	09	Jabe Jones	Kermit McGee	2
Chevrolet	Key Motorsports	05	Randy MacDonald	Curtis Key	2
Chevrolet	Key Motorsports	05	Tommy Ellis	Curtis Key	9
Chevrolet	Key Motorsports	05	Tom Peck	Curtis Key	2
Chevrolet	Labonte Motorsports	14	Terry Labonte	Terry Labonte	20
Chevrolet	Lasater Motorsports	5	Richard Lasater	Dan Lasater	13
Chevrolet	Levin Racing	19	Kirk Shelmerdine (R)	Carol Levin	4
Chevrolet	Lewis Motorsports	80	Ashton Lewis Jr.	Ashton Lewis Sr.	3
Chevrolet	MacDonald Motorsports	01	Randy MacDonald	Randy MacDonald	2
Chevrolet	McGee & Jones Racing	09	Jabe Jones (R)	Kermit McGee	2
Chevrolet	Moore Racing	47	Kelly Moore	Richard Moore	3
Chevrolet	Neil Bonnett	12	David Bonnett	Neil Bonnett	2
Chevrolet	NEMCO Motorsports	87	Joe Nemechek	Joe Nemechek	11
Chevrolet	NEMCO Motorsports	89	John Nemechek		1
Chevrolet	Owen Racing	9	Mike Wallace	Barry Owen	24
Chevrolet	Owen Racing	9	Nathan Buttke	Barry Owen	3
Chevrolet	Payne Racing	27	Roy Payne	Curtis Payne	24
Chevrolet	Sherry Blakley	83	Sherry Blakley	Sherry Blakley	1
Chevrolet	Shoemaker Racing	64	Jimmy Spencer	Dennis Shoemaker	5
Chevrolet	Shoemaker Racing	64	Phil Parsons	Dennis Shoemaker	2
Chevrolet	Shoemaker Racing	64	Dick Trickle	Dennis Shoemaker	5
Chevrolet	Speedway Motorsports	56	Ronald Cooper	Lewis Cooper	9
Chevrolet	Truex Motorsports	56	Martin Truex Sr.	Martin Truex Sr.	1
Chevrolet	Truex Motorsports	58	Martin Truex Sr.	Martin Truex Sr.	1
Chevrolet	Stan Barrett	91	Stanton Barrett	Stan Barrett	3
Chevrolet	Troy Beebe	93	Troy Beebe	Troy Beebe	3
Chevrolet	Whitaker Racing	7	Harry Gant	Ed Whitaker	18
Chevrolet	Unknown	1	Mike Stefanik		1
Chevrolet	Unknown	11	Mike Stefanik		1
Chevrolet	Unknown	14	Mike Stefanik		1
Chevrolet	Unknown	47	Kerry Teague		4
Chevrolet	Unknown	69	Brad Noffsinger		1
Chevrolet	Unknown	95	Brian Donley		1
Chevrolet	Unknown	98	Rich Bickle		2
Chevrolet	Unknown	02	Kenny Irwin Jr.		1
Chevrolet	Unknown	04	Ken Wallace Jr.		6
Chevrolet	Unknown		Jeff Green		1
Ford	Akins-Sutton Motorsports	38	Elton Sawyer	Bob Sutton	27
Ford	Ron Zook	82	Hut Stricklin	Ron Zook	1
Ford	Ron Zook	82	Elton Sawyer	Ron Zook	1
Ford	Ron Zook	82	Derrike Cope	Ron Zook	11
Ford	Ron Zook	82	Jimmy Kitchens	Ron Zook	1
Ford	Butch Leitzinger	91	Butch Leitzinger	Butch Leitzinger	1
Ford	Charles Hardy Racing	11	Bill Elliott	Charles Hardy	1
Ford	Ernie Irvan Racing	28	Ernie Irvan	Ernie Irvan	8
Ford	Ernie Irvan Racing	28	Mark Martin	Ernie Irvan	1
Ford	Ernie Irvan Racing	28	Todd Bodine	Ernie Irvan	1
Ford	H.S. Die Racing Team	86	Tim Steele	Harold Steele	4
Ford	Glanville Motorsports	81	Jerry Glanville	Jerry Glanville	1
Ford	Houston Racing	6	Tommy Houston	Tommy Houston	21
Ford	K. R. Rezendes, Inc.	79	Dave Rezendes	Dave Rezendes	26
Ford	Rexrode Galiano Motorsports	1	Mike Stefanik	Rodney Rexrode; Joiann Galiano	3
Ford	Rexrode Galiano Motorsports	1	Tommy Houston	Rodney Rexrode; Joiann Galiano	1
Ford	Rexrode Galiano Motorsports	1	Jeff Neal	Rodney Rexrode; Joiann Galiano	7
Ford	Roush Racing	60	Mark Martin	Jack Roush	14
Ford	Shepherd Racing	21	Morgan Shepherd	Morgan Shepherd	10
Ford	Thackston Racing	24	Glenn Jarrett	Marvin Thackston	1
Ford	Tobias Racing	50	Toby Tobias Jr.	Toby Tobias Jr.	3
Ford	TTC Motrosports Inc.	45	Rich Bickle	Gene Isenhour	1
Ford	Whitcomb Racing	15	Dirk Stephens (R)	Bob Whitcomb	19
Ford	Unknown		Harris DeVane		1
Ford	Unknown		Earl Davis		1
Oldsmobile	Coleman Rice	73	Eddie Johnson	Coleman Rice	2
Oldsmobile	Dwight Huffman Racing	77	Eddie Sharp	Dwight Huffman	1
Oldsmobile	Mountain Racing	09	Tom Rosati	Allen Avery	2
Oldsmobile	Team Goewey	1	Andy Santerre	Bryan Goewey	1
Pontiac	Bahari Racing	30	Michael Waltrip	Chuck Rider	8
Pontiac	Bob Bender	36	Tim Bender	Bob Bender	3
Pontiac	Boisvert Racing	7	Dale Shaw	Quint Boisvert	3
Pontiac	Doug Thorpe Jr.	84	Doug Thorpe Jr.	Doug Thorpe Jr.	1
Pontiac	Douglas Motorsports	17	Johnny Chapman	Jimmy Douglas	1
Pontiac	Michael Waltrip Racing	17	Jeff Green	Michael Waltrip	1
Pontiac	Jerry Francis	68	Chris Diamond	Jerry Francis	5
Pontiac	Dick McCabe	0	Dick McCabe	Dick McCabe	1
Pontiac	Ling Racing	0	Robbie Crouch	Don Ling, Sr.	1
Pontiac	Ling Racing	6	Robbie Crouch	Don Ling, Sr.	1
Pontiac	Petty Enterprises	43	Rodney Combs	Petty Enterprises	25
Pontiac	Petty Enterprises	43	Dick Trickle	Petty Enterprises	1
Pontiac	Petty Enterprises	43	Robert Pressley	Petty Enterprises	1
Pontiac	Victory Motorsports	42	David Blankenship	Unknown	1
Pontiac	Unknown	01	Pete Silva		1
Chevrolet Pontiac	Laughlin Racing Products	35	Randy Porter (R)	Mike Laughlin	19
Chevrolet Pontiac	Laughlin Racing Products	35	Robert Pressley	Mike Laughlin	6
Chevrolet Pontiac	Laughlin Racing Products	35	Jimmy Hensley	Mike Laughlin	1
Chevrolet Pontiac	NLW Motorsports	0	Mike Garvey (R)	Ned LaWarre	14
Chevrolet Pontiac	Reiser Racing	17	Robbie Reiser	Robbie Reiser	13
Chevrolet Pontiac	Wegner Racing	33	Bobby Labonte	Carl Wegner	12
Chevrolet Oldsmobile	Henderson Brothers Racing	75	Doug Heveron	Charlie Henderson	24
Chevrolet Oldsmobile	Joe Bessey Motorsports	97	Joe Bessey	Nancy Bessey	12
Chevrolet Oldsmobile	Linville Racing	62	Robbie Stanley	John Linville	1
Chevrolet Oldsmobile	Linville Racing	62	Rob Young	John Linville	1
Chevrolet Oldsmobile	Mark Thomas Racing	96	Stevie Reeves (R)	Mark Thomas	27
Chevrolet Oldsmobile	John Ritch	02	Michael Ritch	John Ritch	4
Chevrolet Oldsmobile	Phil Parsons Racing	29	Phil Parsons	Marcia Parsons	11
Chevrolet Buick	Ivan Murphy	70	Bobby Dragon	Ivan Murphy	1
Chevrolet Buick	Ivan Murphy	70	Dale Fischlein	Ivan Murphy	6
Chevrolet Buick	Lepage Racing	71	Kevin Lepage (R)	Kevin Lepage	25
Chevrolet Ford	Three Star Motorsports	22	Ed Berrier	Three Star Motorsports	4
Chevrolet Ford	Tom Milner	41	Johnny Rumley	Tom Milner	11
Chevrolet Ford	Tom Milner	41	Johnny Smith	Tom Milner	3
Chevrolet Ford Pontiac	Taylor Motorsports	40	Dale Williams	Doug Taylor	3
Chevrolet Ford Pontiac	Taylor Motorsports	40	Patty Moise	Doug Taylor	11
Unknown	Unknown	77	David Bonnett		1
Unknown	Unknown		David Bonnett		1
Unknown	Unknown		Eddie Goodson		3
Unknown	Unknown		Junior Miller		2
Unknown	Unknown		Junior Franks		2
Unknown	Unknown		Martin Truex Sr.		1
Unknown	Unknown		Johnny Chapman		3
Unknown	Unknown		Johnny Rumley		1
Unknown	Unknown		Glenn Brewer		1
Unknown	Unknown		Robert Huffman		1
Unknown	Unknown		Franklin Butler III		3
Unknown	Unknown		Kurt Owens		2
Unknown	Unknown		Mike Knight		2
Unknown	Unknown		John Alexander		1
Unknown	Unknown		Toby Porter		1
Unknown	Unknown		Mark Whitaker		1
Unknown	Unknown		Tom Bolles		1
Unknown	Unknown		Babe Branscombe		1
Unknown	Unknown		Bob Brunell		1
Unknown	Unknown		Scott Deware		1
Unknown	Unknown		Brian Donley		1
Unknown	Unknown		Ed Ferree		1
Unknown	Unknown		Bryan Goewey		1
Unknown	Unknown		Jerry Marquis		1
Unknown	Unknown		Barney McRae		1
Unknown	Unknown		Steve Nowakowski		1
Unknown	Unknown		Pete Rondeau		1
Unknown	Unknown		Glenn Sullivan		1

Notes:

- If under "team", the owner's name is listed and in italics, that means the name of the race team that fielded the car is unknown.

== Races ==
=== Goody's 300 ===
The Goody's 300 was held February 19 at Daytona International Speedway. The No. 30 of Michael Waltrip won the pole.

Top ten results

1. 3–Dale Earnhardt
2. 32–Dale Jarrett
3. 23–Chad Little
4. 14–Terry Labonte
5. 28–Ernie Irvan
6. 4–Sterling Marlin
7. 21–Morgan Shepherd
8. 8–Kenny Wallace
9. 99–Robert Pressley
10. 31–Tom Peck

• Michael Waltrip ran well until he lost the right half of his rear spoiler late in the race.

• This was Earnhardt's 21st and final win in the Busch Grand National Series, as well as his fifth straight victory in the Goody's 300, a record that still stands today.

=== Goodwrench 200 ===
The Goodwrench 200 was held February 26 at North Carolina Speedway. Robert Pressley won the pole.

Top ten results

1. 14–Terry Labonte
2. 7–Harry Gant
3. 25–Hermie Sadler
4. 20–Randy LaJoie
5. 99–Robert Pressley
6. 31–Tom Peck
7. 56–Ronald Cooper
8. 60–Mark Martin
9. 59–Dennis Setzer
10. 9–Mike Wallace

Notable DNQ's: Larry Pearson

=== Hardee's 250 ===
The Hardee's 250 was held March 5 at Richmond International Raceway. The No. 44 of David Green won the pole.

Top ten results

1. 87–Joe Nemechek
2. 8–Kenny Wallace
3. 7–Harry Gant
4. 38–Elton Sawyer
5. 25–Hermie Sadler
6. 14–Terry Labonte
7. 2–Ricky Craven
8. 60–Mark Martin
9. 55–Tim Fedewa
10. 57–Jason Keller

• This was the only time Dale Earnhardt failed to qualify in any of the top two series of NASCAR

=== Busch Light 300 ===
The Busch Light 300 was held March 12 at Atlanta Motor Speedway. The No. 46 of Shawna Robinson* won the pole.

Top ten results

1. 7–Harry Gant
2. 92–Larry Pearson
3. 35–Randy Porter
4. 14–Terry Labonte
5. 72–Tracy Leslie
6. 97–Joe Bessey
7. 20–Randy LaJoie
8. 59–Dennis Setzer
9. 32–Dale Jarrett
10. 3–Dale Earnhardt

Notable DNQ's: 25–Hermie Sadler, 38–Elton Sawyer (both bought rides and still competed in the race)

- Shawna Robinson became the first woman to win a pole in either of NASCAR's major touring series with this pole. However, she crashed on the first lap of the race with Joe Nemechek after Mike Wallace made it three-wide going into turn 3. Both Robinson and Nemechek accused Wallace of claiming that he was going to wreck Robinson, and then doing it just like he said he would. Wallace denied this. No punishment was assessed in the aftermath.
- Final career NASCAR Busch Grand National Series victory for Harry Gant.

=== Miller 500 ===
The Miller 500 was held March 20 at Martinsville Speedway. David Green won the pole.

Top ten results

1. 14–Terry Labonte
2. 44–David Green
3. 8–Kenny Wallace
4. 20–Randy LaJoie
5. 75–Doug Heveron
6. 92–Larry Pearson
7. 55–Tim Fedewa
8. 00–Johnny Rumley
9. 43–Rodney Combs
10. 05–Tommy Ellis

=== Mark III Vans 200 ===
The Mark III Vans 200 was held March 26 at Darlington Raceway. Mark Martin won the pole.

Top ten results

1. 60–Mark Martin
2. 92–Larry Pearson
3. 20–Randy LaJoie
4. 8–Kenny Wallace
5. 7–Harry Gant
6. 3–Dale Earnhardt
7. 30–Michael Waltrip
8. 29–Phil Parsons
9. 55–Tim Fedewa
10. 25–Hermie Sadler

=== Sundrop 400 ===
The Sundrop 400 was held April 3 at Hickory Motor Speedway. David Green won the pole.

Top ten results

1. 2–Ricky Craven
2. 20–Randy LaJoie
3. 44–David Green
4. 74–Johnny Benson Jr.
5. 6–Tommy Houston
6. 31–Tom Peck
7. 72–Tracy Leslie
8. 00–Johnny Rumley
9. 25–Hermie Sadler
10. 99–Robert Pressley -1

=== Goody's 250 ===
The Goody's 250 was held April 9 at Bristol Motor Speedway. The No. 60 of Mark Martin* won the pole.

Top ten results

1. 44–David Green
2. 6–Tommy Houston
3. 17–Jeff Green
4. 32–Dale Jarrett
5. 63–Jim Bown
6. 92–Larry Pearson
7. 7–Harry Gant
8. 82–Derrike Cope
9. 64–Phil Parsons
10. 43–Rodney Combs
- Mark Martin was leading this race at the white flag under caution and had the race won. Apparently confused by other drivers (Tommy Houston and Tracy Leslie) pulling alongside and waving to him like the race was already over, Martin pulled off the track to go to victory lane approximately 400 feet short of the finish line. This gifted David Green his only victory of 1994. It was the first time in NASCAR history that a winner leading at the yellow flag accidentally gave the race away to another driver, but the second time in NASCAR history that a driver mistakenly thought that the race was over one lap too early, therefore dropping a spot or more in the final results (the first was Cale Yarborough in 1984 at Daytona).

=== Pantry Stores 300 ===
The final Pantry Stores 300 was held April 30 at Orange County Speedway. The No. 57 of Jason Keller won the pole.

Top ten results

1. 25–Hermie Sadler
2. 59–Dennis Setzer
3. 8–Kenny Wallace
4. 74–Johnny Benson Jr. -1
5. 2–Ricky Craven -1
6. 05–Tommy Ellis -1
7. 63–Jim Bown -1
8. 92–Larry Pearson -1
9. 02–Michael Ritch -2
10. 08–Bobby Dotter -3
- This was Sadler's last career NASCAR Busch Series victory.
- According to a 1995 issue of NASCAR Winston Cup Scene, there was a race at Orange County Speedway scheduled for 1995, but it was cancelled before it could be run.

=== NE Chevy 250 ===
The NE Chevy 250 was held May 7 at New Hampshire International Speedway. The No. 33 of Bobby Labonte won the pole.

Top ten results

1. 82–Derrike Cope
2. 08–Bobby Dotter
3. 52–Ken Schrader
4. 8–Kenny Wallace
5. 23–Chad Little
6. 44–David Green
7. 92–Larry Pearson
8. 59–Dennis Setzer
9. 71–Kevin Lepage -1
10. 34–Mike McLaughlin -2

=== Meridian Advantage 200 ===
The Meridian Advantage 200 was held May 22 at Nazareth Speedway. Kenny Wallace won the pole.

Top ten results

1. 2–Ricky Craven
2. 38–Elton Sawyer
3. 9–Mike Wallace
4. 44–David Green
5. 34–Mike McLaughlin
6. 08–Bobby Dotter
7. 55–Tim Fedewa
8. 8–Kenny Wallace
9. 59–Dennis Setzer
10. 72–Tracy Leslie

=== Champion 300 ===
The Champion 300 was held May 28 at Charlotte Motor Speedway. The No. 88 of Mike Skinner won the pole.

Top ten results

1. 29–Phil Parsons
2. 60–Mark Martin
3. 30–Michael Waltrip
4. 27–Roy Payne
5. 28–Ernie Irvan -1
6. 99–Robert Pressley -1
7. 56–Ronald Cooper -1
8. 14–Terry Labonte -1
9. 34–Mike McLaughlin -1
10. 97–Joe Bessey -1
- This was Parsons' last career NASCAR victory.

=== Goodwrench/Delco 200 ===
The Goodwrench/Delco 200 was held June 4 at Dover International Speedway. Ricky Craven won the pole.

Top ten results

1. 9–Mike Wallace*
2. 14–Terry Labonte
3. 60–Mark Martin
4. 64–Jimmy Spencer
5. 2–Ricky Craven
6. 55–Tim Fedewa
7. 99–Robert Pressley
8. 57–Jason Keller
9. 87–Joe Nemechek
10. 72–Tracy Leslie
- This was Mike Wallace's first career NASCAR Busch Grand National Series victory.

=== Carolina Pride/Budweiser 250 ===
The Carolina Pride/Budweiser 250 was held June 11 at Myrtle Beach Speedway. The No. 57 of Jason Keller won the pole.

Top ten results

1. 38–Elton Sawyer*
2. 8–Kenny Wallace
3. 2–Ricky Craven
4. 99–Robert Pressley
5. 23–Chad Little
6. 44–David Green
7. 08–Bobby Dotter
8. 63–Jim Bown
9. 43–Rodney Combs
10. 92–Larry Pearson
- This was Elton Sawyer's first career NASCAR Busch Grand National Series victory.

=== Fay's 150 ===
The Fay's 150 was held June 25 at Watkins Glen International. Ricky Craven won the pole.

Top ten results

1. 14–Terry Labonte
2. 08–Bobby Dotter*
3. 72–Tracy Leslie
4. 44–David Green
5. 25–Hermie Sadler
6. 99–Robert Pressley
7. 2–Ricky Craven
8. 23–Chad Little
9. 92–Larry Pearson
10. 46–Shawna Robinson
- Bobby Dotter suffered injuries in a crash during the Goodwrench/Delco 200 at Dover. Dotter started the 150 mile event, but ended up requiring relief from road racer Scott Lagasse. Since Dotter started the race, he got credit for the finish.

=== Havoline 250 ===
The Havoline 250 was held July 3 at The Milwaukee Mile. David Green won the pole.

Top ten results

1. 9–Mike Wallace
2. 44–David Green
3. 74–Johnny Benson Jr.
4. 33–Bobby Labonte
5. 8–Kenny Wallace
6. 34–Mike McLaughlin
7. 23–Chad Little
8. 38–Elton Sawyer
9. 59–Dennis Setzer
10. 2–Ricky Craven

=== Ford Credit 300 ===
The Ford Credit 300 was held July 16 at South Boston Speedway. David Green won the pole.

Top ten results

1. 59–Dennis Setzer
2. 25–Hermie Sadler
3. 74–Johnny Benson Jr.
4. 44–David Green
5. 23–Chad Little
6. 99–Robert Pressley
7. 72–Tracy Leslie
8. 9–Nathan Buttke
9. 79–Dave Rezendes
10. 63–Jim Bown

=== Fram Filter 300K ===
The Fram Filter 300K was held July 23 at Talladega Superspeedway. Jeff Purvis won the pole.

Top ten results

1. 52–Ken Schrader
2. 14–Terry Labonte
3. 3–Dale Earnhardt
4. 4–Sterling Marlin
5. 51–Jeff Purvis
6. 23–Chad Little
7. 34–Mike McLaughlin
8. 9–Mike Wallace
9. 25–Hermie Sadler
10. 72–Tracy Leslie

=== The Pantry 300 ===
The Pantry 300 was held July 31 at Hickory Motor Speedway. David Green won the pole.

Top ten results

1. 59–Dennis Setzer
2. 8–Kenny Wallace
3. 44–David Green
4. 75–Doug Heveron
5. 92–Larry Pearson
6. 25–Hermie Sadler
7. 2–Ricky Craven
8. 23–Chad Little
9. 08–Bobby Dotter
10. 55–Tim Fedewa
- This was Setzer's last career NASCAR Busch Series victory.

=== Kroger 200 ===
The Kroger 200 was held Friday night August 5 at Indianapolis Raceway Park. David Green won the pole.

Top ten results

1. 9–Mike Wallace
2. 6–Tommy Houston
3. 34–Mike McLaughlin
4. 59–Dennis Setzer
5. 23–Chad Little
6. 2–Ricky Craven
7. 44–David Green
8. 8–Kenny Wallace
9. 57–Jason Keller
10. 08–Bobby Dotter
- After several years of mid-summer races, and various dates ranging from June to August, in 1994 the Kroger 200 was permanently planted as a support race for the new Winston Cup Brickyard 400 at nearby Indianapolis Motor Speedway. With the Brickyard 400 being held on a Saturday, the Kroger 200 was scheduled for Friday night. A huge sell-out crowd for the Kroger 200 saw extra bleachers erected at the oval, with thousands of additional fans in town that weekend for the inaugural stock car race at Indy.

=== Detroit Gasket 200 ===
The Detroit Gasket 200 was held August 20 at Michigan International Speedway. Derrike Cope won the pole.

Top ten results

1. 33–Bobby Labonte
2. 23–Chad Little
3. 60–Mark Martin
4. 34–Mike McLaughlin
5. 64–Dick Trickle
6. 59–Dennis Setzer
7. 55–Tim Fedewa
8. 25–Hermie Sadler
9. 92–Larry Pearson
10. 57–Jason Keller

=== Food City 250 ===
The Food City 250 was held August 26 at Bristol Motor Speedway. Harry Gant won the pole.

Top ten results

1. 8–Kenny Wallace
2. 52–Ken Schrader
3. 44–David Green
4. 2–Ricky Craven
5. 64–Dick Trickle
6. 57–Jason Keller
7. 72–Tracy Leslie
8. 74–Johnny Benson Jr.
9. 14–Terry Labonte
10. 28–Mark Martin
- For this race, Mark Martin - instead of driving his normal Roush Racing #60 Winn-Dixie Ford Thunderbird - substituted in the #28 car normally driven by Ernie Irvan following Irvan's severe injuries following a crash practicing for the 1994 GM Goodwrench Dealer 400 in the Winston Cup Series.

=== Gatorade 200 ===
The Gatorade 200 was held September 3 at Darlington Raceway. Randy LaJoie won the pole.

Top ten results

1. 60–Mark Martin
2. 32–Dale Jarrett
3. 9–Mike Wallace
4. 74–Johnny Benson Jr.
5. 23–Chad Little
6. 34–Mike McLaughlin
7. 92–Larry Pearson
8. 2–Ricky Craven
9. 38–Elton Sawyer
10. 59–Dennis Setzer

=== Autolite 250 ===
The Autolite 250 was held September 9 at Richmond International Raceway. Jason Keller won the pole.

Top ten results

1. 8–Kenny Wallace
2. 60–Mark Martin
3. 3–Dale Earnhardt
4. 14–Terry Labonte
5. 31–Steve Grissom
6. 74–Johnny Benson Jr.
7. 30–Michael Waltrip
8. 44–David Green
9. 92–Larry Pearson
10. 33–Bobby Labonte

=== SplitFire 200 ===
The SplitFire 200 was held September 17 at Dover International Speedway. Harry Gant won the pole.

Top ten results

1. 74–Johnny Benson Jr.
2. 7–Harry Gant
3. 2–Ricky Craven
4. 57–Jason Keller
5. 25–Hermie Sadler
6. 20–Randy LaJoie
7. 99–Bobby Hillin Jr.
8. 29–Phil Parsons
9. 14–Terry Labonte
10. 97–Joe Bessey

=== All Pro 300 ===
The All Pro 300 was held October 8 at Charlotte Motor Speedway. Mark Martin won the pole.

Top ten results

1. 14–Terry Labonte
2. 60–Mark Martin
3. 82–Derrike Cope
4. 23–Chad Little
5. 38–Elton Sawyer
6. 63–Jim Bown
7. 4–Sterling Marlin
8. 2–Ricky Craven
9. 20–Jimmy Hensley
10. 76–Jeff Green
- This was Dale Earnhardt's last Busch Series race. He dropped out after just five laps due to engine failure.

=== Advance Auto 500 ===
The Advance Auto 500 was held October 16 at Martinsville Speedway. David Green won the pole.

Top ten results

1. 8–Kenny Wallace
2. 44–David Green
3. 9–Mike Wallace
4. 55–Tim Fedewa
5. 23–Chad Little
6. 14–Terry Labonte
7. 08–Bobby Dotter
8. 2–Ricky Craven
9. 6–Tommy Houston
10. 57–Jason Keller
- This was the final race at Martinsville Speedway for the Busch Series until 2006.

=== AC-Delco 200 ===
The AC-Delco 200 was held October 22 at North Carolina Speedway. David Green won the pole.

Top ten results

1. 60–Mark Martin
2. 3–Michael Waltrip
3. 2–Ricky Craven
4. 7–Harry Gant
5. 23–Chad Little
6. 8–Kenny Wallace
7. 9–Mike Wallace
8. 74–Johnny Benson Jr.
9. 20–Randy LaJoie
10. 43–Robert Pressley

This was the final time that V6 engines were used in the Busch Series. They would make the switch to V8 power in 1995.

== Full Drivers' Championship ==
(key) Bold – Pole position awarded by time. Italics – Pole position set by owner's points. * – Most laps led.

Pos	Driver	DAY	CAR	RCH	ATL	MAR	DAR	HCY	BRI	ROU	NHA	NAZ	CLT	DOV	MYB	GLN	MLW	SBO	TAL	HCY	IRP	MCH	BRI	DAR	RCH	DOV	CLT	MAR	CAR	Pts
1	David Green	38	19	**16**	19	**2**	12	**3**	1	26	6	4	24	15	6	4	**2**	**4**	13	**3**	**7**	27	3	14	8	16	19	**2**	**12**	3725
2	Ricky Craven	35	24	7	17	12	14	1*	15	5	22	1*	11	**5**	3	7	10	21	32	7	6	23	4	8	24	3	8	8	3	3679
3	Chad Little	3	15	22	14	27	18	22	24	15	5	11	34	17	5	8	7	5	6	8	5	2	12	5	14	15	4	5	5	3662
4	Kenny Wallace	8	23	2	21	3	4	27	20	3*	4	**8**	43	38	2	25	5	23*	24	2	8	34	1*	21	1*	18	15	1	6	3554
5	Hermie Sadler	12	3	5	32	28	10	9	18	1	13	25	15	20	17	5	11	2	9	6	12	8	14	25	29	5	18	15	25	3466
6	Johnny Benson Jr. **(R)**	26	25	15	16	20	16	4	30	4	12	31	22	22	16	33	3	3	38	11	11*	38	8	4	6	1	11	13	8	3303
7	Bobby Dotter	13	11	27	15	17	23	15	16	10	2	6	14	36	7	2	19	11	25	9	10	26	16	18	12	31	23	7	15	3299
8	Larry Pearson	22	DNQ	35	2	6	2	19	6	8	7	29	19	11	10*	9	15	20	11	5	24	9	33	7	9	22	22	12	21	3277
9	Dennis Setzer **(R)**	37	9	26	8	24	31	26	17	2	8	9	17	33	14	14	9	1	36	1*	4	6	21	10	23	12	21	21	17	3273
10	Tim Fedewa	31	16	9	30	7	9	25	23	18	11	7	13	6	13	24	28	30	20	10	21	7	19	20	21	17	13	4	38	3125
11	Tracy Leslie	24	17	19	5	26	11	7	12	11	28	10	38	10	19	3	18	7	10	17	14	31	7	39	26	23	29	22	20	3088
12	Robert Pressley	9	**5**	13	31	14	15	10	19	13	24	35	6	7	4	6	34	6	29	20	15	28	26	36	15	40	14	36	10	3043
13	Mike McLaughlin	29	22	11	39	21	21	12	DNQ	16	10	5	9	18	31	19	6	15	7	16	3	4	DNQ	6	11	28	27	11	35	2986
14	Elton Sawyer	20	12	4	38	22	13	28		31	DNQ	22	21	13	1	35	8	17	21	14	22	20	15	9	31	13	5	19	39	2873
15	Jim Bown	42	14	14	24	18	33	11	5	7	21	33	18	26	8	32	13	10	39	12	34	11	11	38	27	20	6	28	22	2852
16	Randy LaJoie	28	4	31	7	4	3	2	27	24	19	26	25	42	24	12	37	16	15	15	18	33	36	**27**	19	6		30	9	2837
17	Jason Keller	DNQ	29	10	28	31	36	29	13	**12**	27	19	12	8	**11**	28	20	14	37	19	9	10	6	15	**36**	4	43	10	36	2767
18	Terry Labonte	4	1	6	4	1*	37		33		20		8	2		1*			2			35	9	13	4	9	1	6	34	2720
19	Mike Wallace	14	10	34	11	33	17	14	14		37	3	DNQ	1*		23	1*		8	13	1	36	20	3		33	DNQ	3*	7	2679
20	Mark Martin	23	8*	8	29		**1**		**11***				2*	3					43			3*	10	1*	2		**2***		1*	2132
21	Rodney Combs	11	27	38	18	9	28	DNQ	10	28	29	38	27	14	9	11	14	13	28	DNQ	17	39		42	35	24	32			2131
22	Dave Rezendes	DNQ	33	32	DNQ	DNQ	36	18	22	17	DNQ	17	33	31	12	21	21	9	18	27	DNQ	14		33	33	26	25	27	24	1992
23	Harry Gant	32	2	3	1*		5		7				30	32			12		31		32	24	**28**	23	DNQ	**2***	35		4	1939
24	Kevin Lepage **(R)**	DNQ	37	12	DNQ	34	32	16	26	27	9	23	DNQ	28	27	15	40	DNQ	26	DNQ	19		27	22		29	30	18	23	1865
25	Phil Parsons	36	31		41		8		9				1	12		37					16	17	18	24	16	8	16	14	16	1839
26	Stevie Reeves **(R)**		20	25	DNQ	13	34	17	DNQ	22	DNQ	27	DNQ	16	18	30	35	DNQ	DNQ	DNQ	31	16	17	28	28	30	41	20	13	1817
27	Doug Heveron	41		39	42	5	22	23	DNQ	30	40	40	DNQ		15		41	32	16	4	13	13	DNQ	35		19	40	17	26	1780
28	Tommy Houston	33	35	DNQ		16	42	5	2	25		13	DNQ		22			29	33	DNQ	2		25	30	39	35	DNQ	9	42	1658
29	Roy Payne	39	26	24	35	DNQ	26	DNQ	34	23	DNQ		4	29	29		17	18	DNQ	24	33		37	37	32		17	29	30	1640
30	Randy Porter **(R)**	15	39	29	3	15	25	DNQ		20	26	14	42	25	23	29	25	25	34	30	DNQ									1525
31	Dirk Stephens **(R)**			37	12	DNQ	20	21	21		39	24	DNQ		30		27	12	DNQ	DNQ	25		35	17			38		18	1317
32	Derrike Cope								8		1		37	QL			16		23			**21**	23	12	13		3		14	1314
33	Johnny Rumley **(R)**					8		8		DNQ	18		DNQ	23	20	31	26	24	27	28	23		22		DNQ			25		1276
34	Dale Earnhardt	1	38	DNQ	10		6				31		23	39					3			32		41	3		45			1188
35	Bobby Labonte	30			13						**35**		35			26	4		40			1	13		10	25	34			1188
36	Dale Jarrett	2	40	DNQ	9		38		4				36	21					35					2		11	20			1176
37	Joe Bessey	16	28	36	6		29		31		15		10						DNQ							10	24		11	1152
38	Ken Schrader	27			DNQ			13	DNQ		3		26	30			23		1			15	2				42			1128
39	Tom Peck	10	6	20	26	25	27	6	29							22					DNQ							34	33	1090
40	Joe Nemechek	34		1*	43						32		31	9		34			12					11	17		26			1065
41	Michael Waltrip	**25***			34		7						3						41						7	41	12		2	983
42	Mike Garvey **(R)**	40	30	17	25	19	30	DNQ		14			DNQ		DNQ		42		19		26	29		40						963
43	Steve Grissom												32	35		18			22	29		19		32	5	39	31		31	921
44	Sterling Marlin	6			QL		41						40			36	39		4*			18			34		7			810
45	Morgan Shepherd	7	13		DNQ		19		25				39						17					19	37		DNQ			780
46	Tommy Ellis					10		30		6			16	41	34			28							38	37				753
47	Shawna Robinson	DNQ	36	23	**36**	29	DNQ	DNQ	36	DNQ	DNQ		DNQ	24	26	10	22				Wth									742
48	Robbie Reiser **(R)**			DNQ	DNQ	DNQ	35	24		DNQ			DNQ		21		30	26		23	29	25	31							735
49	Nathan Buttke	DNQ		DNQ		DNQ				19					28		29	8		18			34	29					32	716
50	Ronald Cooper	DNQ	7	30	33	DNQ			28			37	7	27																642
51	Ernie Irvan	5			40						43		5	40			36		30			42								558
52	Patty Moise	DNQ		DNQ									DNQ	19		20						12	24		25	42	DNQ			552
53	Dick Trickle																					5	5			14	DNQ	37	40	532
54	Chad Chaffin **(R)**	43	32	DNQ	DNQ	DNQ		DNQ	35	33			DNQ		32			22	DNQ	DNQ	20									490
55	Michael Ritch					11				9															20			32		438
56	Richard Lasater	DNQ	34	DNQ	22	23	40	DNQ	32	DNQ			DNQ	37			DNQ		DNQ											414
57	Mike Skinner									29			**28**		DNQ			DNQ		26	28		29							395
58	Jeff Purvis				DNQ								29						**5**				32		30		DNQ			371
59	Kirk Shelmerdine **(R)**	17	42	18	20																									361
60	Randy MacDonald	18		21	37																					21				361
61	Jeff Green								3												QL					34	10	DNQ		360
62	David Bonnett		18	DNQ		DNQ				DNQ			DNQ									22			DNQ		39		19	358
63	Jimmy Spencer	DNQ		28										4										DNQ	18					348
64	Clay Brown					32									33		38				DNQ		30					DNQ	28	332
65	Dale Fischlein	DNQ			DNQ								DNQ						14	21		30								294
66	Bobby Hillin Jr.																							34		7	28			286
67	Chris Diamond							20		32					DNQ					DNQ								24		261
68	Ed Berrier	DNQ										QL									QL			16			33		27	261
69	George Crenshaw **(R)**	DNQ		DNQ		30		DNQ		21			DNQ		DNQ			DNQ		DNQ						36	DNQ			228
70	Jimmy Hensley																										9		29	214
71	Johnny Smith	DNQ		DNQ	DNQ			DNQ										19		22										203
72	Stanton Barrett												20														36		41	198
73	Mike Stefanik **(R)**	44		33	DNQ						41	16													22					192
74	Dale Williams											22			25						DNQ									185
75	Jack Baldwin				23		24																							185
76	Rich Bickle	DNQ			27														42										37	171
77	Jeff Neal **(R)**							DNQ		DNQ	44	32	DNQ	34			DNQ				Wth									159
78	Tim Bender												41									41					37			132
79	Andy Petree																											16		115
80	Pat Davison			DNQ		DNQ		DNQ			19							DNQ												112
81	Bill Elliott	19																												106
82	Ken Wallace Jr.		21	DNQ		DNQ					16	20				16														100
83	Andy Hillenburg **(R)**	21		DNQ	DNQ	DNQ		DNQ		DNQ										DNQ										100
84	Johnny Chapman				DNQ								DNQ							DNQ								23		94
85	Ashton Lewis											DNQ					24	DNQ			DNQ							DNQ		91
86	Pete Silva																			25										88
87	David Hyder																											26		85
88	Greg Clark										DNQ													26			DNQ			85
89	Jimmy Kitchens																				27									82
90	Eddie Johnson																	27										DNQ		82
91	Brian Donley										DNQ															27				82
92	John Nemechek																				30									73
93	Bob Brevak																31													70
94	Ed Ferree										DNQ							31												70
95	Robert Powell																							31						70
96	David Blankenship																											31		70
97	Troy Beebe	DNQ																	DNQ							32				67
98	Doug Thorpe Jr.																32													67
99	Jabe Jones												DNQ				33													64
100	Jay Fogleman																											33		64
101	Tim Steele	DNQ			DNQ							DNQ										37								52
102	Toby Tobias Jr.											DNQ					DNQ									38				49
103	John Alexander																		DNQ			40								43
104	Barry Bostick		41				DNQ						DNQ																DNQ	40
105	Todd Bodine																										44			31
106	Dale Shaw										14	30				13														
107	Kelly Moore										42	21				17														
108	Martin Truex Sr.			DNQ							30	12				38														
109	Andy Santerre										DNQ	18				39														
110	Robbie Crouch										33	34																		
111	Tom Rosati										36	39																		
112	Brian Ross										DNQ	15																		
113	Jamie Aube										23																			
114	Bobby Dragon										25																			
115	Butch Leitzinger															27														
116	Jeff Barry										DNQ	28																		
117	Dick McCabe										34																			
118	Tom Bolles										DNQ	36																		
119	Stub Fadden										38																			
120	Glenn Jarrett	DNQ																												
121	Jack Sprague	DNQ																												
122	Eddie Sharp	DNQ																												
123	Hut Stricklin	DNQ																												
124	Kerry Teague	DNQ		DNQ	DNQ	DNQ																								
125	Hank Parker		DNQ			DNQ		Wth																						
126	Eddie Goodson			DNQ						DNQ					DNQ															
127	Robbie Stanley				DNQ																									
128	Junior Miller					DNQ		DNQ																						
129	Jerry Glanville							DNQ																						
130	Junior Franks							DNQ		DNQ			DNQ																	
131	Babe Branscombe										DNQ																			
132	Bob Brunell										DNQ																			
133	Scott Deware										DNQ																			
134	Bryan Goewey										DNQ																			
135	Jerry Marquis										DNQ																			
136	Barney McRae										DNQ																			
137	Steve Nowakowski										DNQ																			
138	Pete Rondeau										DNQ																			
139	Glenn Sullivan										DNQ																			
140	Glenn Brewer												DNQ																	
141	Robert Huffman												DNQ																	
142	Kurt Owens																	DNQ		DNQ										
143	Mike Knight																	DNQ		DNQ										
144	Franklin Butler III																	DNQ		DNQ								DNQ		
145	Harris DeVane																		DNQ											
146	Toby Porter																			DNQ										
147	Brad Noffsinger																				DNQ									
148	Kenny Irwin Jr.																				DNQ									
149	Rob Young																				DNQ									
150	Sherry Blakley																										DNQ			
151	Mark Whitaker																											DNQ		
152	Earl Davis																											DNQ		
153	Gary Green																				Wth									
154	Mike Laws				QL																									
155	Scott Hansen																QL													
156	Curtis Markham																				QL									
Pos	Driver	DAY	CAR	RCH	ATL	MAR	DAR	HCY	BRI	ROU	NHA	NAZ	CLT	DOV	MYB	GLN	MLW	SBO	TAL	HCY	IRP	MCH	BRI	DAR	RCH	DOV	CLT	MAR	CAR	Pts

== Rookie of the Year ==
Grand Rapids, Michigan native Johnny Benson Jr. won the Busch Series Rookie of the Year award in 1994, winning once and finishing sixth in points, followed closely by Dennis Setzer, a two-time winner on the circuit. Kevin Lepage and Stevie Reeves were the only others drivers who attempted the season on a full-time basis that season.

== See also ==
- 1994 NASCAR Winston Cup Series
- 1994–95 NASCAR SuperTruck Series exhibition races
- 1994 NASCAR Winston Transcontinental Series
