= Sherry Blakley =

American racing driver (1962–2011)

- Nationality: (United States) American
- Born: March 16, 1962 Austin, Texas, United States
- Died: February 13, 2011 (aged 48) Florida, United States

NASCAR Goody's Dash Series
- Years active: 1991—1994
- Starts: 29
- Wins: 0
- Poles: 0
- Best finish: 8th in 1993

Previous series
- 1988: All Pro Super Series

Sherry King Blakley-Vaughn, also known as Sherry Hinkle (March 16, 1962 – February 13, 2011) was an American stock car racing driver. She competed in NASCAR Goody's Dash Series races during the 1980s and 1990s.

== Career ==
A native of San Antonio, Texas, Blakley made her debut in racing at age 16 at local tracks in central Texas, following having been a cheerleader at Texas Military Institute. She raced in the All Pro Series and Goody's Dash Series starting in the mid-1980s, becoming best known for a controversial sponsorship deal with Ramses prophylactics in 1994. She attempted to qualify for the Snowball Derby in 1990 and 1991, but failed to make the field for either race; she attempted to race in the Busch Series in 1994, but failed to qualify for any races, crashing in qualifying at Charlotte Motor Speedway.

Married to Jeff Blakely and with one son, Blakley died on February 13, 2011.

== Motorsports career results ==
=== NASCAR ===
(key) (Bold – Pole position awarded by qualifying time. Italics – Pole position earned by points standings or practice time. * – Most laps led.)

==== Busch Series ====
NASCAR Busch Series results
Year	Team	No.	Make	1	2	3	4	5	6	7	8	9	10	11	12	13	14	15	16	17	18	19	20	21	22	23	24	25	26	27	28	NBSC	Pts
1994	Info not available			DAY	CAR	RCH	ATL	MAR	DAR	HCY	BRI	ROU	NHA	NZH	CLT	DOV	MYB	GLN	MLW	SBO	TAL	HCY	IRP	MCH	BRI	DAR	RCH	DOV	CLT; DNQ	MAR	CAR	NA	-
