= Toby Tobias =

American racing driver

- Born: Richard Lincoln Tobias; February 12, 1932 Lebanon, Pennsylvania, U.S.
- Died: June 23, 1978 (aged 46) Flemington, New Jersey, U.S.

Motorsport career
- Debut season: 1950
- Car number: 17
- Championships: 7
- Wins: 300+
- Finished last season: 1978

Championship titles
- 1977 New York State Fair Champion; 1978 Tony Hulman Classic

Awards
- 1970 USAC Rookie of the year

NASCAR Cup Series career
- 1 race run over 1 year
- Best finish: 121st (1973)
- First race: 1973 Delaware 500 (Dover)
Wins	Top tens	Poles
0	0	0

Dick “Toby” Tobias (February 12, 1932 – June 23, 1978) was an American stock car and sprint car racing driver from Lebanon, Pennsylvania. He revolutionized the dirt track modified stock car class by producing a chassis constructed of tubular steel.

== Racing career ==
Tobias began his racing career in the early 1950's at the Hilltop Speedway in Pennsylvania. He then spent the majority of his career racing in the sprint and modified divisions competing at the renowned tracks of the northeast, including the Nazareth Speedway and the Reading Fairgrounds Speedway in Pennsylvania, and the Flemington Speedway in New Jersey. Tobias made just one appearance in the NASCAR Cup Series.

In 1972, Tobias developed a workable home-built frame for his Modified that replaced the mid 50's Chevy frames rails that had been popular. The Tobias tube chassis soon was incorporated into the rules for the New York and Pennsylvania racing circuit, and remains the standard.

== Personal life ==
Tobias was fatally injured in a USAC sprint car race at Flemington Speedway on June 23, 1978. He was inducted into the Eastern Motorsports Press Association, the National Sprint Car and the Northeast Dirt Modified Halls of Fame.

Tobias was followed into racing by his sons Ronnie, Scott, Toby Jr. and son-in-law Paul Lotier. Scott and Paul were severely and permanently injured in racing accidents, and Ronnie died of a heart attack while racing. Grandson Paul Lotier Jr. later became the third generation involved in racing as co-owner of a sprint car.

== Motorsports career results ==
=== NASCAR ===
(key) (Bold – Pole position awarded by qualifying time. Italics – Pole position earned by points standings or practice time. * – Most laps led.)

==== Cup Series ====
NASCAR Cup Series results
Year	Team	No.	Make	1	2	3	4	5	6	7	8	9	10	11	12	13	14	15	16	17	18	19	20	21	22	23	24	25	26	27	28	NWCC	Pts	Ref
1973	Noris Reed	83	Mercury	RSD	DAY	RCH	CAR	BRI	ATL	NWS	DAR	MAR	TAL	NSV	CLT	DOV	TWS	RSD	MCH	DAY	BRI	ATL	TAL	NSV	DAR	RCH	DOV; 38	NWS	MAR	CLT	CAR	121st	NA	
