= John Alexander (racing driver) =

American stock car racing driver

- Born: May 22, 1954 (age 72); Elmira, New York

NASCAR Cup Series career
- 1 race run over 1 year
- Best finish: 101st (1990)
- First race: 1990 Budweiser at the Glen (Watkins Glen International)
Wins	Top tens	Poles
0	0	0

NASCAR O'Reilly Auto Parts Series career
- 1 race run over 1 year
- Best finish: 103rd (1994)
- First race: 1994 Detroit Gasket 200 (Michigan International Speedway)
Wins	Top tens	Poles
0	0	0

John Alexander (born May 22, 1954) is an American stock car racing driver. He has competed in both the NASCAR Busch Series and the Winston Cup Series. In the two races he entered, he did not finish.

== NASCAR career ==
Alexander, born May 22, 1954, started racing in NASCAR in 1990, by competing in the Winston Cup Series' 1990 Budweiser at the Glen at Watkins Glen International. He started 39th and finished 38th after having an oil leak. He also competed in one Busch Series race in 1994, finishing fortieth after being involved in a crash.

== Motorsports career results ==
=== NASCAR ===
(key) (Bold – Pole position awarded by qualifying time. Italics – Pole position earned by points standings or practice time. * – Most laps led.)

==== Winston Cup Series ====
NASCAR Winston Cup Series results
Year	Team	No.	Make	1	2	3	4	5	6	7	8	9	10	11	12	13	14	15	16	17	18	19	20	21	22	23	24	25	26	27	28	29	NWCC	Pts	Ref
1990	Meacham Racing	04	Ford	DAY	RCH	CAR	ATL	DAR	BRI	NWS	MAR	TAL	CLT	DOV	SON	POC	MCH	DAY	POC	TAL	GLN; 38	MCH	BRI	DAR	RCH	DOV	MAR	NWS	CLT	CAR	PHO	ATL	101st	49	

==== Busch Series ====
NASCAR Busch Series results
Year	Team	No.	Make	1	2	3	4	5	6	7	8	9	10	11	12	13	14	15	16	17	18	19	20	21	22	23	24	25	26	27	28	NBSC	Pts	Ref
1994		46	Chevy	DAY	CAR	RCH	ATL	MAR	DAR	HCY	BRI	ROU	NHA	NZH	CLT	DOV	MYB	GLN	MLW	SBO	TAL; DNQ	HCY	IRP	MCH; 40	BRI	DAR	RCH	DOV	CLT	MAR	CAR	103rd	43	

=== ARCA Permatex SuperCar Series ===
(key) (Bold – Pole position awarded by qualifying time. Italics – Pole position earned by points standings or practice time. * – Most laps led.)

ARCA Permatex SuperCar Series results
Year	Team	No.	Make	1	2	3	4	5	6	7	8	9	10	11	12	13	14	15	16	17	18	19	20	APSSC	Pts	Ref
1990	Bob Schacht Racing	55	Chevy	DAY	ATL; 20	KIL	TAL; 10	FRS	POC; 27	KIL	TOL	HAG	POC; 7	TAL; 24	MCH	ISF	TOL	DSF	WIN	DEL	ATL			33rd	-	
1991	Bob Schacht Racing	54	Buick	DAY	ATL	KIL	TAL; 10	TOL	FRS	POC	MCH	KIL	FRS	DEL	POC	TAL	HPT	MCH	ISF	TOL	DSF	TWS	ATL	100th	-	
