= Ed Ferree =

American racing driver (born 1952)

- Born: March 16, 1952 (age 74); Saxonburg, Pennsylvania, U.S.

NASCAR Cup Series career
- 3 races run over 3 years
- Best finish: 58th (1993)
- First race: 1992 Budweiser At The Glen (Watkins Glen)
- Last race: 1993 Budweiser At The Glen (Watkins Glen)
Wins	Top tens	Poles
0	0	0

NASCAR O'Reilly Auto Parts Series career
- 49 races run over 7 years
- Best finish: 26th (1991)
- First race: 1988 Hampton 200 (Langley)
- Last race: 1994 Ford Credit 300 (South Boston)
Wins	Top tens	Poles
0	5	0
- Statistics up to date as of November 4, 2024.

Ed Ferree (born March 16, 1952) is an American former professional stock car racing driver who has competed in the NASCAR Winston Cup Series and NASCAR Busch Series.

Ferree has also competed in series such as the NASCAR Busch North Series, the Lucas Oil Late Model Dirt Series, the Stacker 2 Xtreme DirtCar Series, and the Northern Xtreme DirtCar Series.

== Motorsports career results ==
=== NASCAR ===
(key) (Bold - Pole position awarded by qualifying time. Italics - Pole position earned by points standings or practice time. * – Most laps led.)

==== Winston Cup Series ====
NASCAR Winston Cup Series results
Year	Team	No.	Make	1	2	3	4	5	6	7	8	9	10	11	12	13	14	15	16	17	18	19	20	21	22	23	24	25	26	27	28	29	30	NWCC	Pts	Ref
1991	Gayle Ferree	45	Chevy	DAY	RCH	CAR	ATL	DAR	BRI	NWS	MAR	TAL	CLT	DOV	SON	POC	MCH	DAY	POC	TAL	GLN; DNQ	MCH	BRI	DAR	RCH	DOV	MAR	NWS	CLT	CAR	PHO	ATL		N/A	0	
1992	Gayle Ferree	45	Chevy	DAY	CAR	RCH	ATL	DAR	BRI	NWS	MAR	TAL	CLT	DOV	SON	POC	MCH	DAY	POC	TAL	GLN; 29	MCH	BRI	DAR	RCH	DOV	MAR	NWS						77th	76	
1992	Gayle Ferree	05	Chevy																										CLT; DNQ	CAR	PHO	ATL		77th	76	
1993	Gayle Ferree	05	Chevy	DAY	CAR; 27	RCH	ATL	DAR	BRI	NWS	MAR	TAL	SON	CLT	DOV	POC	MCH	DAY	NHA	POC	TAL	GLN; 36	MCH	BRI	DAR	RCH	DOV	MAR	NWS	CLT	CAR; DNQ	PHO	ATL	58th	137	

==== Busch Series ====
NASCAR Busch Series results
Year	Team	No.	Make	1	2	3	4	5	6	7	8	9	10	11	12	13	14	15	16	17	18	19	20	21	22	23	24	25	26	27	28	29	30	31	NBSC	Pts	Ref
1988	Ed Ferree	45	Buick	DAY	HCY	CAR	MAR	DAR	BRI	LNG; 23	NZH	SBO; 16	NSV	CLT	DOV	ROU	LAN	LVL	MYB	OXF	SBO; 15	HCY	LNG	IRP	ROU	BRI	DAR	RCH	DOV	MAR	CLT	CAR	MAR		83rd	94	
1989	Ed Ferree	49	Pontiac	DAY	CAR	MAR; 5	HCY; 17	DAR	BRI	NZH	SBO	LAN	NSV	CLT	DOV	ROU	LVL	VOL	MYB	SBO	HCY	DUB	IRP	ROU	BRI	DAR	RCH	DOV	MAR	CLT; DNQ	CAR; 36	MAR; 14			55th	443	
1990	Ed Ferree	49	Pontiac	DAY	RCH	CAR	MAR; 30	HCY			LAN; 26	SBO; 24	NZH; 37	HCY	CLT; QL	DOV; 17	ROU	VOL	MYB	OXF	NHA; 12	SBO	DUB	IRP; 33	ROU	BRI	DAR	RCH	DOV; 19	MAR	CLT; DNQ	NHA; 31	CAR	MAR	41st	762	
1990	Ed Ferree	39	Pontiac						DAR; 32	BRI																									41st	762	
1991	Ed Ferree	49	Buick	DAY; DNQ	RCH; 19	CAR; 21	MAR	VOL; 23	HCY; 5	DAR; 26	BRI; 18	LAN; 28	SBO; 24	NZH; 34	CLT; 31	DOV; 32	ROU; 10	HCY; 19	MYB; 23	GLN; 18	OXF; 41	NHA; 31	SBO; 28	DUB	IRP; 28	ROU	BRI	DAR	RCH	DOV	CLT	NHA	CAR	MAR; 18	26th	1837	
1992	Ed Ferree	49	Buick	DAY; DNQ	CAR; 20	RCH	ATL	MAR; 27	DAR	BRI	HCY; 23	LAN	DUB	NZH		DOV; 20	ROU; 25	MYB	GLN; 10	VOL	NHA; 39	TAL	IRP; 10	ROU	MCH	NHA; 35	BRI	DAR	RCH	DOV	CLT	MAR	CAR	HCY	40th	960	
1992	Ed Ferree	49	Olds												CLT; 15																				40th	960	
1993	Ed Ferree	49	Olds	DAY	CAR	RCH	DAR	BRI	HCY	ROU	MAR	NZH	CLT	DOV	MYB	GLN; 17	MLW	TAL	IRP	MCH	NHA	BRI	DAR	RCH	DOV	ROU	CLT	MAR	CAR	HCY	ATL				86th	112	
1994	Ed Ferree	46	Chevy	DAY	CAR	RCH	ATL	MAR	DAR	HCY	BRI	ROU	NHA; DNQ	NZH	CLT	DOV	MYB	GLN	MLW	SBO; 31	TAL	HCY	IRP	MCH	BRI	DAR	RCH	DOV	CLT	MAR	CAR				94th	70	

=== ARCA Permatex SuperCar Series ===
(key) (Bold – Pole position awarded by qualifying time. Italics – Pole position earned by points standings or practice time. * – Most laps led.)

ARCA Permatex SuperCar Series results
Year	Team	No.	Make	1	2	3	4	5	6	7	8	9	10	11	12	13	14	15	16	APSSC	Pts	Ref
1986	N/A	44	Chevy	ATL	DAY	ATL	TAL	SIR	SSP	FRS	KIL	CSP	TAL	BLN	ISF	DSF	TOL	MCS	ATL; DNQ	N/A	0	
