= Jerry O'Neil (racing driver) =

American racing driver (born 1956)

- Born: March 28, 1956 (age 70); Auburn, New York, U.S.

NASCAR Cup Series career
- 16 races run over 4 years
- Best finish: 46th (1992)
- First race: 1989 Goodwrench 500 (Rockingham)
- Last race: 1993 Mello Yello 500 (Charlotte)
| Wins | Top tens | Poles |
|---|---|---|
| 0 | 0 | 0 |

Jerry O'Neil (born March 28, 1956) is an American retired NASCAR driver from Auburn, New York. He competed in sixteen NASCAR Winston Cup Series races in his career between 1990 and 1993.

O'Neil's last start in Winston Cup was in 1993, at the second Charlotte event. He was also a frequent competitor in the Automobile Racing Club of America (ARCA).

== Motorsports career results ==
=== NASCAR ===
(key) (Bold – Pole position awarded by qualifying time. Italics – Pole position earned by points standings or practice time. * – Most laps led.)

==== Winston Cup Series ====
NASCAR Winston Cup Series results
| Year | Team | No. | Make | 1 | 2 | 3 | 4 | 5 | 6 | 7 | 8 | 9 | 10 | 11 | 12 | 13 | 14 | 15 | 16 | 17 | 18 | 19 | 20 | 21 | 22 | 23 | 24 | 25 | 26 | 27 | 28 | 29 | 30 | 31 | NWCC | Pts | Ref |
|---|---|---|---|---|---|---|---|---|---|---|---|---|---|---|---|---|---|---|---|---|---|---|---|---|---|---|---|---|---|---|---|---|---|---|---|---|---|
| 1989 | Aroneck Racing | 53 | Chevy | DAY | CAR; 28 | ATL | RCH | DAR | BRI | NWS; DNQ | MAR; DNQ | TAL | CLT; 26 | DOV | SON | POC | MCH | DAY | POC | TAL | GLN | MCH | BRI | DAR | RCH | DOV | MAR | | | | | | | | 52nd | 268 | |
| 1989 | Aroneck Racing | 53 | Olds | | | | | | | | | | | | | | | | | | | | | | | | | CLT; 36 | NWS | CAR; 38 | PHO | ATL; DNQ | | | 52nd | 268 | |
| 1990 | Aroneck Racing | 53 | Olds | DAY; 31 | RCH; DNQ | CAR | ATL; DNQ | DAR | BRI | NWS | MAR | TAL | CLT; DNQ | DOV | SON | POC; 40 | MCH | DAY | POC; 34 | TAL | | | | | | | | | CLT; DNQ | CAR | PHO | ATL | | | 51st | 259 | |
| 1990 | U.S. Racing | 2 | Pontiac | | | | | | | | | | | | | | | | | | GLN; 26 | MCH | BRI | DAR | RCH | DOV | MAR | NWS | | | | | | | 51st | 259 | |
| 1991 | Aroneck Racing | 65 | Olds | DAY | RCH | CAR | ATL | DAR | BRI | NWS | MAR | TAL | CLT | DOV | SON | POC | MCH | DAY | POC | TAL | GLN; DNQ | MCH | BRI | DAR | RCH | DOV | MAR | NWS | CLT | CAR | PHO | ATL | | | NA | - | |
| 1992 | Aroneck Racing | 65 | Olds | DAY | CAR | RCH | ATL | DAR | BRI | NWS | MAR; DNQ | TAL | CLT | DOV; 36 | SON | POC; 21 | MCH | DAY | POC; 35 | TAL | GLN; 25 | MCH; DNQ | BRI | DAR | RCH | DOV | MAR | NWS | CLT; 29 | CAR; 37 | PHO | ATL; DNQ | | | 46th | 429 | |
| 1993 | Aroneck Racing | 65 | Olds | DAY | CAR | RCH | ATL | DAR | BRI | NWS | MAR | TAL; DNQ | SON | CLT; DNQ | DOV | POC | MCH | | | | | GLN; DNQ | MCH | BRI | DAR | RCH | DOV | MAR | NWS | | | | | | 64th | 104 | |
| 1993 | Aroneck Racing | 65 | Chevy | | | | | | | | | | | | | | | DAY; DNQ | NHA; 40 | POC | TAL | | | | | | | | | CLT; 34 | CAR; DNQ | PHO | ATL | | 64th | 104 | |
| 1994 | Aroneck Racing | 65 | Chevy | DAY | CAR | RCH | ATL | DAR | BRI | NWS | MAR | TAL | SON | CLT | DOV | POC | MCH | DAY | NHA | POC; DNQ | TAL | IND; DNQ | GLN | MCH | BRI | DAR | RCH | DOV | MAR | NWS | CLT | CAR | PHO | ATL | NA | - | |

===== Daytona 500 =====
| Year | Team | Manufacturer | Start | Finish |
|---|---|---|---|---|
| 1990 | Aroneck Racing | Oldsmobile | 39 | 31 |

=== ARCA Hooters SuperCar Series ===
(key) (Bold – Pole position awarded by qualifying time. Italics – Pole position earned by points standings or practice time. * – Most laps led.)

ARCA Hooters SuperCar Series results
| Year | Team | No. | Make | 1 | 2 | 3 | 4 | 5 | 6 | 7 | 8 | 9 | 10 | 11 | 12 | 13 | 14 | 15 | 16 | 17 | 18 | 19 | 20 | 21 | AHSSC | Pts | Ref |
|---|---|---|---|---|---|---|---|---|---|---|---|---|---|---|---|---|---|---|---|---|---|---|---|---|---|---|---|
| 1992 | Aroneck Racing | 65 | Olds | DAY | FIF | TWS | TAL | TOL | KIL | POC; 33 | MCH | FRS | KIL | NSH | DEL | POC; 7 | HPT | FRS | ISF | TOL | DSF | | | ATL; 31 | 52nd | - | |
| 1992 | Aroneck Racing | 65 | Chevy | | | | | | | | | | | | | | | | | | | TWS; 5 | SLM | | 52nd | - | |
| 1993 | Aroneck Racing | 65 | Chevy | DAY; 27 | FIF | TWS; 44 | TAL | KIL | CMS | FRS | TOL | POC; 3 | MCH | FRS | POC; 18 | KIL | ISF | DSF | TOL | SLM | WIN | ATL | | | 48th | - | |
