= 1994 Brickyard 400 =

First NASCAR race at the Indianapolis Motor Speedway

Race details
- Race 19 of 31 in the 1994 NASCAR Winston Cup Series
- The 1994 Brickyard 400 program cover.
- Date: August 6, 1994
- Location: Indianapolis Motor Speedway in Speedway, Indiana
- Course: Permanent racing facility
- Course length: 2.5 miles (4.023 km)
- Distance: 160 laps, 400 mi (643.74 km)
- Weather: Mild with temperatures approaching 73 °F (23 °C); wind speeds up to 7 miles per hour (11 km/h)
- Average speed: 131.977 miles per hour (212.396 km/h)

Pole position
Driver	Rick Mast	Richard Jackson
- Time: 52.200

Most laps led
Driver	Jeff Gordon	Hendrick Motorsports
- Laps: 93

Winner
No. 24	Jeff Gordon	Hendrick Motorsports

Television in the United States
- Network: ABC
- Announcers: Bob Jenkins and Benny Parsons

The 1994 Brickyard 400 was held on Saturday, August 6, 1994, at the Indianapolis Motor Speedway. The race marked the nineteenth race of the 1994 NASCAR Winston Cup Series season and the eighth race of the 1994 NASCAR Winston Transcontinental Series. It was the first NASCAR stock car race at the famous Speedway and the first race of any kind held at the track beside the Indianapolis 500 since the Harvest Classic in 1916. The race featured the largest crowd in NASCAR history, and a then NASCAR record purse of $3.2 million.

Second-year driver, 23-year-old Jeff Gordon, who once lived in nearby Pittsboro, was cheered on by the hometown crowd to a popular win. It was his second career NASCAR Winston Cup win and thrust the young Gordon, the future hall of famer, into superstardom. Gordon led the most laps (93) and took the lead for the final time on lap 156 (of 160) after Ernie Irvan suffered a blown tire. The race was a turning point in the 1994 NASCAR season. After smacking the wall on the opening lap, Dale Earnhardt charged through the field to a 5th-place finish. Earnhardt took the points lead, and would never relinquish it, en route to his record-tying seventh championship. Irvan's misfortune in the race was followed two weeks later by a serious crash at Michigan where he suffered a near-fatal head injury.

The race was a culmination of decades of speculation and over two years of preparation. While the event was looked on with enormous anticipation and significant media attention, the traditional nature of the Indianapolis 500 and the Speedway was a concern to ownership, some from the Indycar community, and some fans. Despite some mild complaints, the event was considered a huge success and a financial cash cow—it ultimately bankrolled the formation of the Indy Racing League. The race featured two former Indy 500 winners (A. J. Foyt and Danny Sullivan). Foyt came out of retirement to participate, which would be his final Winston Cup start, although he would attempt to enter three more races after, notably the 1995 Brickyard 400 and 1996 Brickyard 400, all of which he failed to qualify.

== Background ==
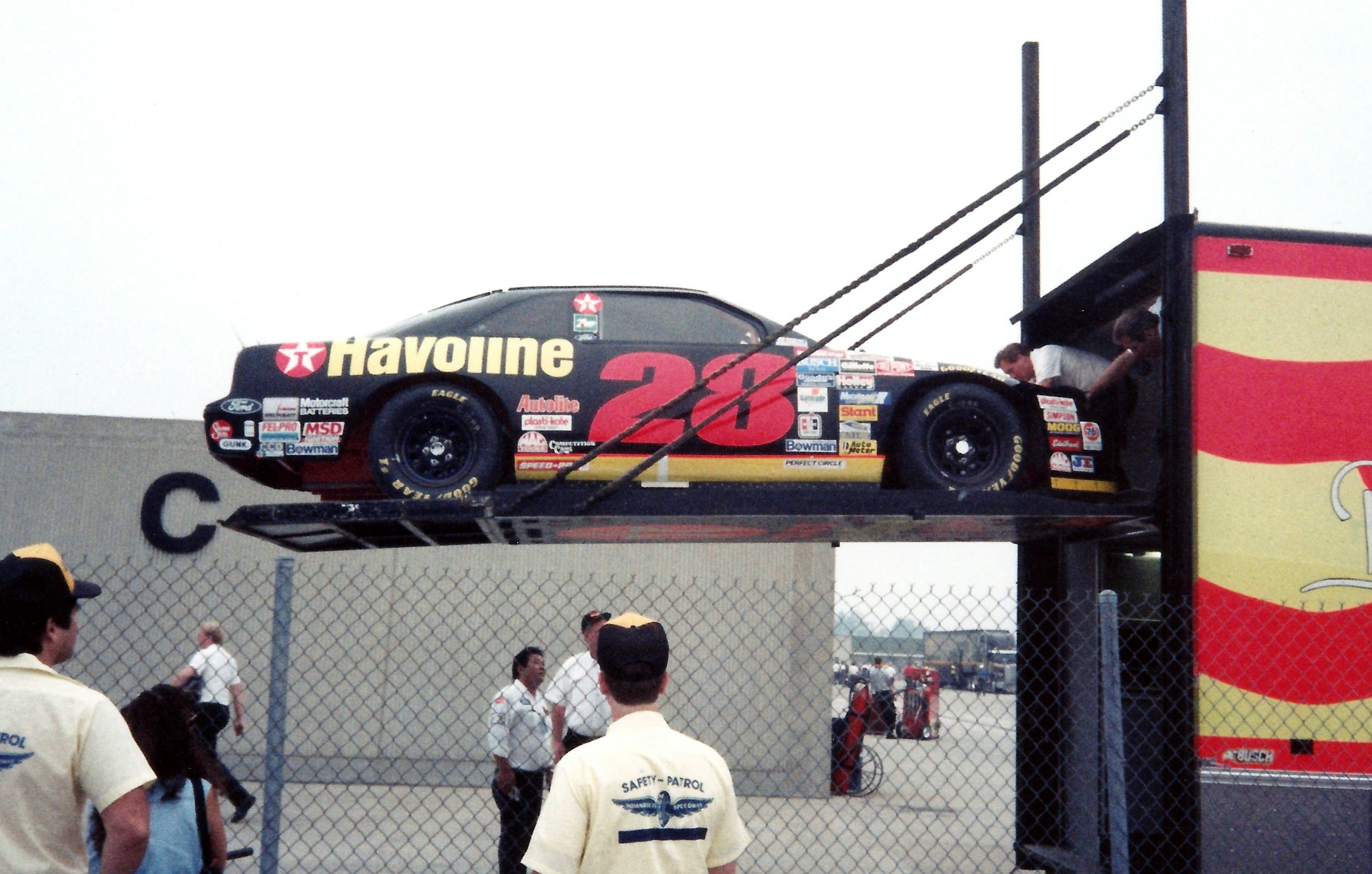
The #28 Robert Yates Racing car being unloaded from the transporter in Gasoline Alley.

The Indianapolis Motor Speedway opened in 1909, and the first Indianapolis 500 was held in 1911. It became a tradition that the Indianapolis 500 was the only race held at the track annually. With the exception of a September race meet in 1916, no other races were held at the track through 1993. As the NASCAR Winston Cup Series began to grow in stature and popularity, speculation began to grow in the 1980s and early 1990s about the possibility of holding a race at Indy.

On September 24, 1991, A. J. Foyt filmed a commercial for Craftsman tools at the Indianapolis Motor Speedway. While filming in the garage area, Foyt, and Speedway president Tony George decided to take Foyt's NASCAR Winston Cup Series stock car for a few laps around the track. Foyt was the first driver to do so, and later on, George himself took a few laps. The event was not planned, and had no implications, but was an unusual sight, and stirred up some mild interest and speculation for the future.

In December 1991, the Indianapolis Motor Speedway board of directors voted to pursue a second race at the Speedway, preferably a NASCAR Winston Cup event. In March 1992, IROC was invited to test cars at the Speedway. On June 22–23, 1992, nine top NASCAR Winston Cup series teams were invited to test at Indy. Although no official announcements were made, it was in fact an unofficial compatibility test to see if stock cars would be competitive at the circuit. An estimated 10,000 spectators watched two days of history in the making.

On April 14, 1993, Speedway President Tony George and president of NASCAR Bill France Jr. jointly announced the inaugural Brickyard 400 would be held Saturday, August 6, 1994. A new race logo was also unveiled. Immediately, anticipation for the event grew, as many drivers contemplated one-off entries, and comparisons were already being made to NASCAR's biggest event, the Daytona 500. ABC signed on to broadcast the race live, and ESPN would cover practice and qualifying.

=== 1994 season ===
Jimmy Spencer won the DieHard 500 at Talladega, immediately preceding the 1994 Brickyard 400. Going into the race, the top five in championship points were as follows:

Championship standings following the 1994 DieHard 500

1. Ernie Irvan, 2,739 points
2. Dale Earnhardt, −16
3. Mark Martin, −258
4. Rusty Wallace, −289
5. Ken Schrader, −357

NASCAR "tire war" was notable during the 1994 season. Both Goodyear and Hoosier tires were used by entrants. Most of the entries and many of the front-runners utilized Goodyear. A total of twelve Hoosier-shod cars would qualify for the race, led by Geoff Bodine.

In order to attract more entries, the initial Brickyard 400 was concurrently included in the then NASCAR Winston Transcontinental Series schedule. One provisional starting position would be available to the top driver in Winston Transcontinental (a temporary rebrand of Winston West) points that did not qualify on speed. The points leader in Winston Transcontinental standings entering the race was Mike Chase.

Going into the race, conjecture amongst fans and media contemplated the possibility of an expanded field, a special qualifying format, a three-abreast starting grid, a celebrity pace car driver, or other changes for the race. However, NASCAR officials planned on treating the Brickyard 400 as any other points-paying race, with standard rules and regulations.

== Tire tests ==
=== 1992 test ===
On June 22–23, 1992, nine top NASCAR Winston Cup series teams were invited to Indy to participate in a Goodyear tire test. Over the weekend, the teams had raced in the Miller Genuine Draft 400 at Michigan International Speedway. Although no official announcements were made, it was in fact an unofficial feasibility test to see if stock cars would be competitive at the circuit. An estimated 20,000-25,000 spectators watched a rather exciting two days of history in the making. A. J. Foyt took a few laps around the track in Dale Earnhardt's car on the second day. ESPN covered the test.

Top speeds
Pos	No.	Driver	Car make	Entrant	Speed	
Pos	No.	Driver	Car make	Entrant	Mon.	Tue.
1	11	Bill Elliott	Ford	Junior Johnson	165.001	168.767
2	4	Ernie Irvan	Chevrolet	Morgan–McClure Motorsports	161.772	167.817
3	2	Rusty Wallace	Pontiac	Penske Racing	160.686	166.704
4	42	Kyle Petty	Pontiac	SABCO Racing	162.657	166.199
5	5	Ricky Rudd	Chevrolet	Hendrick Motorsports	162.375	165.001
6	17	Darrell Waltrip	Chevrolet	Darrell Waltrip Motorsports	161.772	164.567
7	3	Dale Earnhardt	Chevrolet	Richard Childress Racing	162.212	163.194
8	6	Mark Martin	Ford	Roush Racing	161.676	162.346
9	3	A. J. Foyt	Chevrolet	Richard Childress Racing	—	161.452
10	28	Davey Allison	Ford	Robert Yates Racing	161.215	161.261

=== 1993 open test ===
On August 16–17, 1993, thirty-five NASCAR teams took part in an official open test at Indy. It was held as the teams returned from the second race at Michigan, the Champion Spark Plug 400. The top 35 teams in NASCAR points received invitations. Hosting the test in August mimicked the weather conditions expected for the race in 1994. Several thousand spectators attended, and many announcements were made.

Bobby Labonte (165.624 miles per hour (266.546 km/h)) set the fastest lap on Monday, while Bill Elliott (167.467 miles per hour (269.512 km/h)) turned the fastest lap overall on Tuesday morning. On Monday, Kenny Wallace spun out and hit the inside wall. He was taken to Methodist Hospital for minor injuries. At noon on Tuesday, recently retired NASCAR legend Richard Petty took four fast laps by himself and then donated his car to the Speedway museum. Later on Tuesday, during a session of "drafting practice," a full complement of over 30 cars took to the track, to simulate race condition. John Andretti spun in turn 1, and several cars crashed. No injuries were reported, but the incident drew the ire of some of the veterans who thought some drivers were pushing too hard. ESPN covered the test, airing highlights of both days on SpeedWeek.

Some of the participants compared the Indianapolis Motor Speedway to Ontario Motor Speedway, which was built to closely mimic Indy's layout. Only a handful of drivers in the field had actually driven at Ontario before it closed (1980), and none of them felt they held any sort of measurable experience advantage.

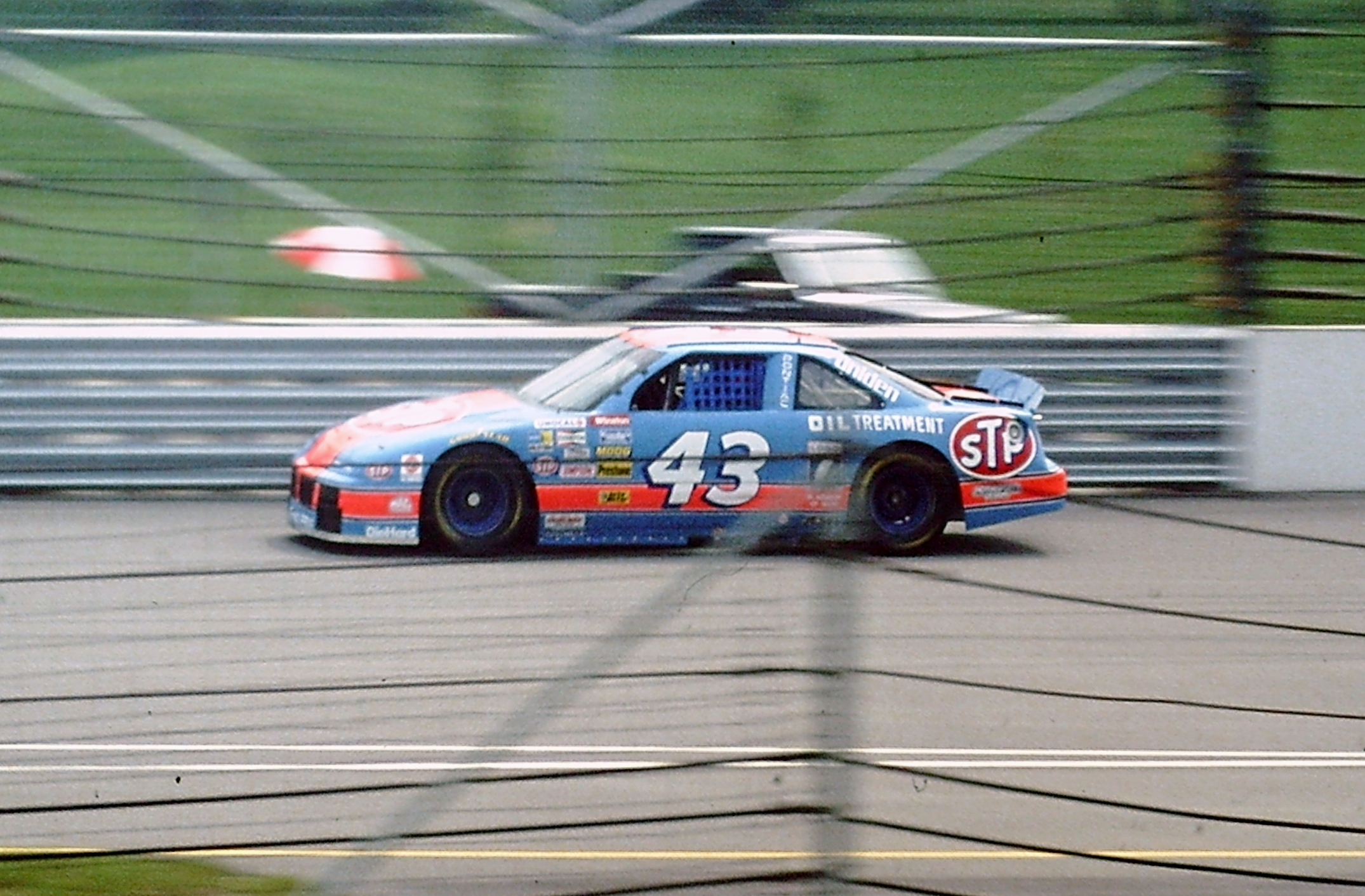
Richard Petty taking practice laps at the Open Test in 1993.

Top ten speeds (combined sessions)
Pos	No.	Driver	Car make	Entrant	Speed
1	11	Bill Elliott	Ford	Junior Johnson	167.467
2	6	Mark Martin	Ford	Roush Racing	165.905
3	24	Jeff Gordon	Chevrolet	Hendrick Motorsports	165.868
4	68	Greg Sacks	Ford	TriStar Motorsports	165.856
5	22	Bobby Labonte	Ford	Bill Davis Racing	165.624
6	7	Geoff Bodine	Ford	Geoff Bodine Racing	165.256
7	25	Ken Schrader	Chevrolet	Hendrick Motorsports	164.754
8	90	Bobby Hillin	Ford	Donlavey Racing	164.495
9	2	Rusty Wallace	Pontiac	Penske Racing	164.429
10	98	Derrike Cope	Ford	Cale Yarborough Motorsports	164.270

=== 1994 testing ===
During the summer of 1994, private testing sessions conducted by the manufacturers were held. Ford teams tested in late June, with Sterling Marlin leading the first week with a lap at 170 miles per hour (270 km/h). During the second week, Ernie Irvan turned the fastest unofficial lap at the Speedway at over 171 miles per hour (275 km/h). Rusty Wallace was close behind at 170 miles per hour (270 km/h). A. J. Foyt came out of retirement, shaking down and testing the #50 Ford.

In early July, Davy Jones turned a lap at 168.659 miles per hour (271.430 km/h), but would later wreck his primary car. Chevrolet and Pontiac's teams took to the track in mid-July. Danny Sullivan blew an engine.

== Entry list ==
86 cars attempted to make the inaugural Brickyard 400 which is a NASCAR record.

- (R) denotes rookie driver.

No.	Driver	Team/Owner	Manufacturer
00W	Scott Gaylord	Oliver Racing	Ford
0	Delma Cowart	H. L. Waters Racing	Ford
1	Rick Mast	Precision Products Racing	Ford
02	Derrike Cope	Taylor Racing	Ford
2	Rusty Wallace	Penske Racing	Ford
3	Dale Earnhardt	Richard Childress Racing	Chevrolet
04W	Hershel McGriff	Breezly Motorsports	Ford
4	Sterling Marlin	Morgan–McClure Motorsports	Chevrolet
5	Terry Labonte	Hendrick Motorsports	Chevrolet
6	Mark Martin	Roush Racing	Ford
07	Geoff Brabham	Kranefuss-Haas Racing	Ford
7	Geoff Bodine	Geoff Bodine Racing	Ford
8	Jeff Burton (R)	Stavola Brothers Racing	Ford
09	Stan Fox	Roulo Brothers Racing	Chevrolet
9	Rich Bickle	Melling Racing	Ford
10	Ricky Rudd	Rudd Performance Motorsports	Ford
11	Bill Elliott	Junior Johnson & Associates	Ford
12	Tim Steele	Bobby Allison Motorsports	Ford
13	Kerry Teague	Linro Motorsports	Chevrolet
14	John Andretti (R)	Hagan Racing	Chevrolet
15	Lake Speed	Bud Moore Engineering	Ford
16	Ted Musgrave	Roush Racing	Ford
17	Darrell Waltrip	Darrell Waltrip Motorsports	Chevrolet
18	Dale Jarrett	Joe Gibbs Racing	Chevrolet
19	Loy Allen Jr. (R)	Tri-Star Motorsports	Ford
20	Randy LaJoie	Moroso Racing	Ford
21	Morgan Shepherd	Wood Brothers Racing	Ford
22	Bobby Labonte	Bill Davis Racing	Pontiac
23	Hut Stricklin	Travis Carter Motorsports	Ford
24	Jeff Gordon	Hendrick Motorsports	Chevrolet
25	Ken Schrader	Hendrick Motorsports	Chevrolet
26	Brett Bodine	King Racing	Ford
27	Jimmy Spencer	Junior Johnson & Associates	Ford
28	Ernie Irvan	Robert Yates Racing	Ford
29	Steve Grissom (R)	Diamond Ridge Motorsports	Chevrolet
30	Michael Waltrip	Bahari Racing	Pontiac
31	Ward Burton (R)	A.G. Dillard Motorsports	Chevrolet
32	Dick Trickle	Active Motorsports	Chevrolet
33	Harry Gant	Leo Jackson Motorsports	Chevrolet
34	Bob Brevak	Brevak Racing	Ford
36	H. B. Bailey	Bailey Racing	Pontiac
36W	Rich Woodland Jr.	Gilliland Racing	Chevrolet
38	P. J. Jones	Stroppe Motorsports	Ford
39	Joe Ruttman	Roulo Brothers Racing	Chevrolet
40	Bobby Hamilton	SABCO Racing	Pontiac
41	Joe Nemechek (R)	Larry Hedrick Motorsports	Chevrolet
41W	Steve Sellers	Mike Clark	Ford
42	Kyle Petty	SABCO Racing	Pontiac
43	Wally Dallenbach Jr.	Petty Enterprises	Pontiac
44	Bobby Hillin Jr.	Charles Hardy Racing	Ford
47	Billy Standridge	Johnson Standridge Racing	Ford
48	James Hylton	Hylton Motorsports	Pontiac
48W	Jack Sellers	Sellers Racing	Chevrolet
50	A. J. Foyt	A. J. Foyt Enterprises	Ford
50W	Mike Chase	JTC Racing	Chevrolet
51	Jeff Purvis	Phoenix Racing	Chevrolet
52	Brad Teague	Means Racing	Ford
54	Robert Pressley	Leo Jackson Motorsports	Chevrolet
55	Jimmy Hensley	RaDiUs Motorsports	Ford
56	Jerry Hill	Hill Motorsports	Chevrolet
57	Bob Schacht	Balough Racing	Ford
58W	Wayne Jacks	Jacks Motorsports	Pontiac
59	Andy Belmont	Andy Belmont Racing	Ford
59W	Jim Sauter	Dick Simon Racing	Ford
60	Gary Bettenhausen	Barkdoll Racing	Chevrolet
61W	Rick Carelli	Chesrown Racing	Chevrolet
65	Jerry O'Neil	Aroneck Racing	Chevrolet
67	Ken Bouchard	Cunningham Racing	Ford
71	Dave Marcis	Marcis Auto Racing	Chevrolet
75	Todd Bodine	Butch Mock Motorsports	Ford
76W	Ron Hornaday Jr.	Spears Motorsports	Chevrolet
77	Greg Sacks	U.S. Racing	Ford
79	Doug French	T.R.I.X. Racing	Chevrolet
81W	Jeff Davis	Jeff Davis Racing	Ford
82	Charlie Glotzbach	Carl Miskotten	Ford
84	Norm Benning	Norm Benning Racing	Oldsmobile
86W	Butch Gilliland	Gilliland Racing	Chevrolet
88	Davy Jones	U.S. Racing	Ford
90	Mike Wallace	Donlavey Racing	Ford
90W	Joe Heath	Joe Heath	Ford
91W	Robert Sprague	Bruce Latta	Ford
92W	John Krebs	John Krebs Racing	Chevrolet
95	Ben Hess	Sadler Brothers Racing	Ford
95W	Lance Wade	Dan Wade	Ford
98	Jeremy Mayfield (R)	Cale Yarborough Motorsports	Ford
99	Danny Sullivan	Virtue Racing	Chevrolet

== Pole qualifying ==
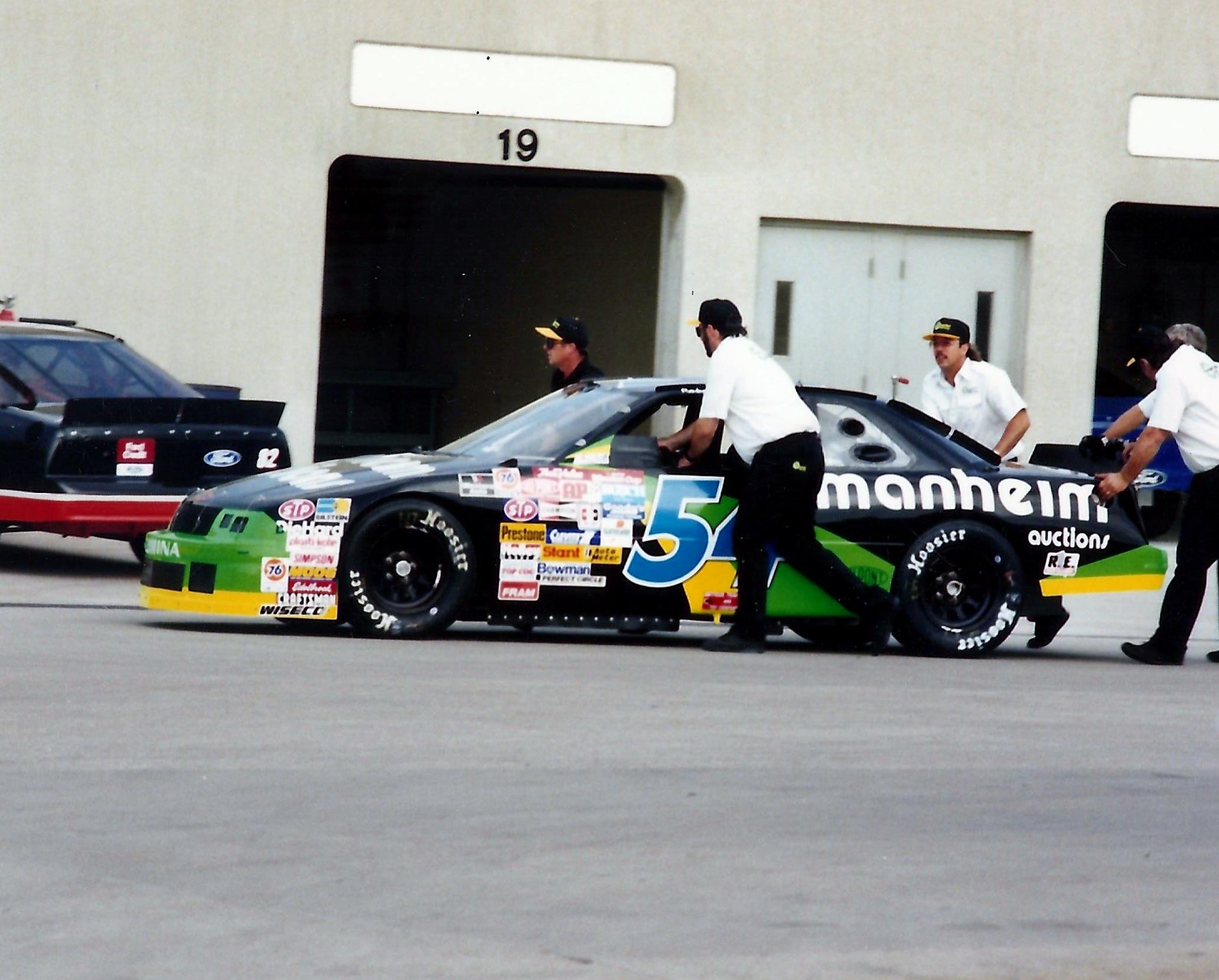
The car of Robert Pressley in the garage area during practice.

Pole qualifying for the Inaugural Brickyard 400 was held on Thursday, August 4, 1994. A NASCAR record 86 cars entered, for 43 starting positions. A blind draw was conducted to determine the qualifying order. A total of 85 cars took part in the draw and H. B. Bailey drew the #1 qualifying attempt. Per the NASCAR rules in 1994, a one-lap qualifying attempt was utilized. The top twenty cars in pole qualifying were locked into the starting field. The remainder of the cars could stand on their time, or make a new attempt in second-round qualifying. The qualifying session was expected to be lengthy, and NASCAR officials planned to run into the evening if necessary to finish. Car owner Richard Petty was perturbed when his car picked one of the last spots in the qualifying order, quipping "That's sometime tomorrow, right?"

The first practice was held Thursday morning. Four incidents occurred, crashes by Joe Nemechek, Robert Pressley, Tim Steele, and Dale Jarrett brushed the wall. Nemechek, Pressley, and Steele would switch to back-up cars, while Jarrett's car was not seriously damaged. The practice session was followed by a heavy thunderstorm that pelted the Speedway. The rain stopped and the track dried, allowing qualifying to start on time at 3 p.m.

The entire qualifying line of 70 attempts was completed without a single incident. H. B. Bailey went into the record books as the first stock car competitor to make a qualifying attempt. His average speed of 152.669 mph was an official stock car track record for only a minute or two, and his speed proved to be the slowest of the day other than those that experienced mechanical problems. Only two drivers experienced trouble, one was Ken Schrader, who blew an engine during his attempt. Dale Earnhardt took the provisional pole with a lap of 171.726 miles per hour (276.366 km/h), but his tenure at the top was short-lived. The very next car out to qualify was Rick Mast. Mast established a new stock car lap record of 172.414 miles per hour (277.473 km/h) to secure the pole position. Jeff Gordon was one of the last cars to make an attempt, and he qualified third. Geoff Bodine and Bobby Labonte round out the top five. Sixteen cars, many of them Winston Transcontinental competitors, did not make a qualifying attempt during the pole round.

Indy car and IMSA regular Geoff Brabham, attempting his first NASCAR race, surprised many by qualifying 18th. Former Indy 500 winners A. J. Foyt and Danny Sullivan, however, did not make the top twenty. Wally Dallenbach Jr. driving for Petty Enterprises, who drew 84th out of the 85 cars in line, pulled in when he felt something was wrong with the engine and ended the day with no speed. Rookie Joe Nemechek, who wrecked his primary car in the morning practice session, bounced back with the 21st-fastest qualifying speed; a speed strong enough that he would stand on his time and ultimately qualify for the race.

=== Pole qualifying results ===
Locked-in cars
SP	No.	Driver	Speed
1	1	Rick Mast	172.414
2	3	Dale Earnhardt	171.726
3	24	Jeff Gordon	171.125
4	7	Geoff Bodine	170.982
5	22	Bobby Labonte	170.794
6	11	Bill Elliott	170.338
7	26	Brett Bodine	170.084
8	10	Ricky Rudd	169.933
9	4	Sterling Marlin	169.766
10	6	Mark Martin	169.690
11	21	Morgan Shepherd	169.687
12	2	Rusty Wallace	169.683
13	77	Greg Sacks	169.677
14	18	Dale Jarrett	169.661
15	30	Michael Waltrip	169.587
16	71	Dave Marcis	169.514
17	28	Ernie Irvan	169.453
18	07	Geoff Brabham	169.310
19	9	Rich Bickle	169.214
20	23	Hut Stricklin	169.065

Failed to qualify in round 1
Pos.	No.	Driver	Speed
21	41	Joe Nemechek	168.989
22	31	Ward Burton	168.900
23	27	Jimmy Spencer	168.890
24	8	Jeff Burton	168.672
25	02	Derrike Cope	168.634
26	5	Terry Labonte	168.574
27	17	Darrell Waltrip	168.401
28	16	Ted Musgrave	168.209
29	98	Jeremy Mayfield	168.108
30	90	Mike Wallace	168.008
31	14	John Andretti	168.008
32	75	Todd Bodine	167.989
33	15	Lake Speed	167.917
34	51	Jeff Purvis	167.917
35	29	Steve Grissom	167.848
36	55	Jimmy Hensley	167.826
37	88	Davy Jones	167.745
38	40	Bobby Hamilton	167.616
39	99	Danny Sullivan	167.358
40	61w	Rick Carelli	167.299
41	20	Randy LaJoie	167.233
42	12	Tim Steele	167.087
43	59W	Jim Sauter	166.914
44	33	Harry Gant	166.911
45	50	A. J. Foyt	166.889
46	19	Loy Allen Jr.	166.599
47	42	Kyle Petty	166.236
48	32	Dick Trickle	166.226
49	47	Billy Standridge	166.052
50	54	Robert Pressley	165.978
51	92w	John Krebs	165.676
52	39	Joe Ruttman	165.621
53	34	Bob Brevak	165.599
54	44	Bobby Hillin	165.353
55	60	Gary Bettenhausen	164.962
56	09	Stan Fox	164.594
57	76w	Ron Hornaday Jr.	164.456
58	95w	Lance Wade	162.922
59	00w	Scott Gaylord	162.285
60	81w	Jeff Davis	161.955
61	50w	Mike Chase	159.864
62	56	Jerry Hill	159.453
63	59	Andy Belmont	159.385
64	58w	Wayne Jacks	159.193
65	95	Ben Hess	158.081
66	04w	Hershel McGriff	157.456
67	36w	Rich Woodland Jr.	155.457
68	36	H. B. Bailey	152.669
69	25	Ken Schrader	120.943
70	43	Wally Dallenbach Jr.	no time

Did not make an attempt
No.	Driver
0	Delma Cowart
13	Kerry Teague
38	P. J. Jones
41w	Steve Sellers
48	James Hylton
48W	Jack Sellers
52	Brad Teague
57	Bob Schacht
65	Jerry O'Neil
67	Ken Bouchard
79	Doug French
82	Charlie Glotzbach
84	Norm Benning
86w	Butch Gilliland
90w	Joe Heath
91w	Robert Sprague

== Second round qualifying ==
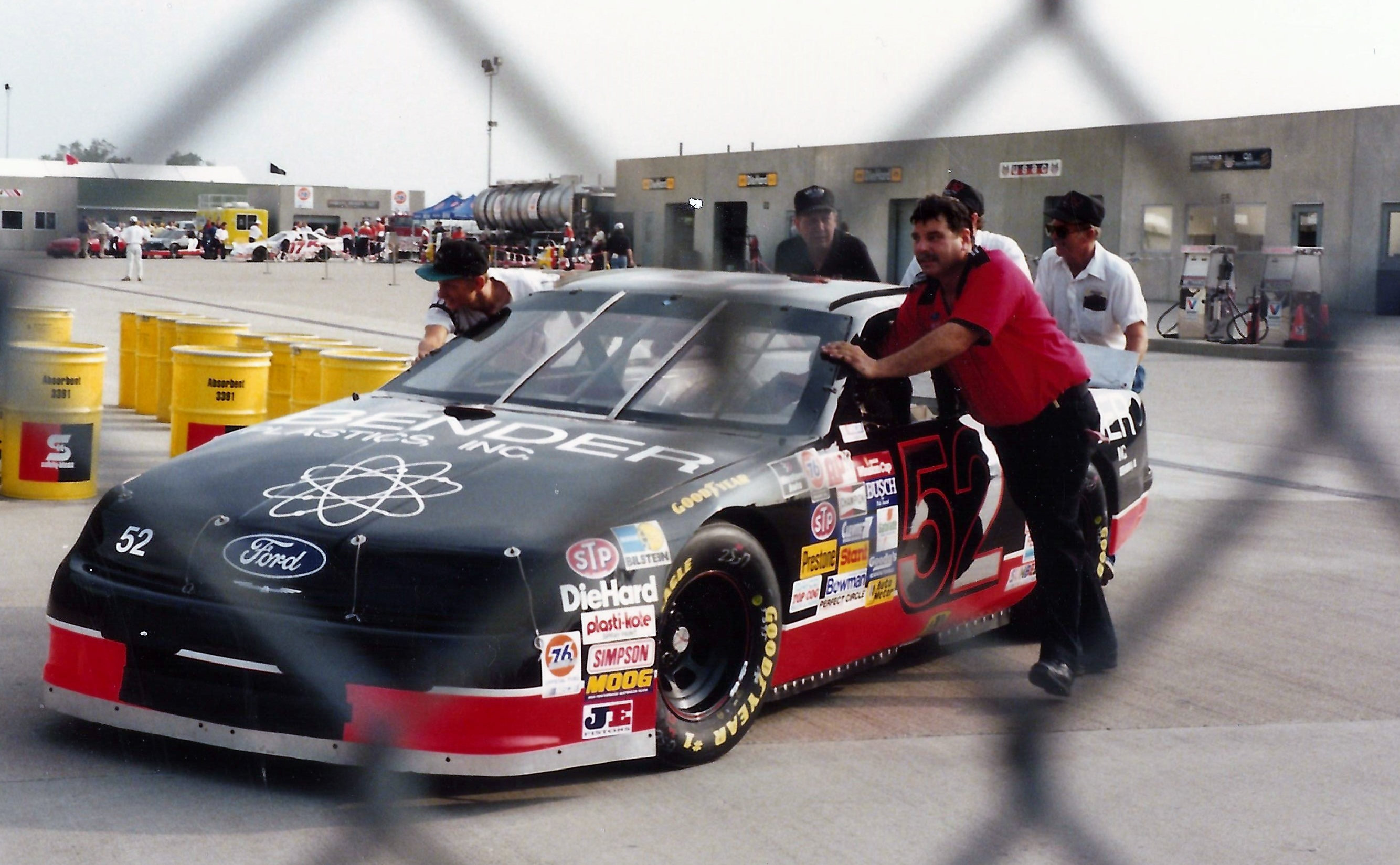
The car of Brad Teague in the garage area during practice.

Second-round qualifying was held Friday August 5, 1994. The drivers that had qualified 1st–20th on Thursday were locked-in to those positions and did not have to re-qualify. The drivers that placed 21st and beyond from the previous round were allowed to stand on their time from Thursday, or erase it and make a new attempt. Due to the expected length of the session, and the sensitive nature of how the track is known to react to changing weather conditions, for fairness, the qualifying draw order from the previous round was inverted for round two. NASCAR subsequently adopted this policy for all races from that day forth until two-round qualifying was abolished at the end of the 2000 season.

Five drivers stood on their times from Thursday, and all five hung on to qualify for the race. Terry Labonte, who had placed 26th Thursday, was among those who elected to re-qualify, and he wound up the fastest qualifier of the day. The decision was wise as Labonte's Thursday speed would not have qualified after Friday. A. J. Foyt managed to qualify in 40th, the last car to make the field on speed. After a miserable run on Thursday, Kyle Petty found much-needed speed and placed 36th. The two drivers who suffered mechanical problems on Thursday - Wally Dallenbach Jr. and Ken Schrader - ranked 2nd and 3rd for the day, respectively.

Lake Speed (168.429 mph) and Harry Gant (168.003 mph) both failed to crack the top 40, but made the field as the provisional starters – the two highest-placed entries in NASCAR points standing not already in the race. No Winston Transcontinental Series competitors made the field on speed, but Mike Chase (166.312 mph) was awarded a special provisional for the highest entry in Winston Transcontinental points standings (Chase was the Winston Transcontinental points leader going into the race).

Very few of the one-off entries by Indy car regulars made the field. Danny Sullivan surprised himself by placing 26th for his first (and only) career Winston Cup start. Popular Indy car owner Dick Simon who was noted for never failing to qualify one of his rookie drivers at the Indy 500 fell short as his driver, NASCAR veteran Jim Sauter, ranked only 47th. After no major incidents during qualifying attempts on Thursday, Friday's qualifying saw wrecks or spins by four cars, including Daytona 500 polesitter Loy Allen Jr. Dick Trickle had a fast lap going until lightly brushing the wall coming off of turn four. He would miss the field by 0.037 seconds.

Among the drivers who chose not to make a qualifying attempt in the second round session was Ben Hess, who had been injured in an accident during a practice session earlier in the day. 56-year old Charlie Glotzbach, who had entered the Indianapolis 500 in 1969–1970 (but failed to qualify in both years), also did not make an attempt. H. B. Bailey, who had drawn the first spot in the qualifying order Thursday was, per the inverted order, the final car to make a qualifying attempt on Friday. Bailey closed out time trials, gaining over 8 mph from his previous speed, but still fell far short of making the starting lineup.

Qualifying cars
SP	No.	Driver	Speed
21	5	Terry Labonte	170.046
22	43	Wally Dallenbach Jr.	169.962
23	25	Ken Schrader	169.635
24	55	Jimmy Hensley	169.492
25	75	Todd Bodine	169.396
26	99	Danny Sullivan	169.214
27	17	Darrell Waltrip	169.186
28	14	John Andretti	169.185
29	51	Jeff Purvis	169.005
30	41	Joe Nemechek	168.989*
31	98	Jeremy Mayfield	168.982
32	40	Bobby Hamilton	168.966
33	31	Ward Burton	168.900*
34	27	Jimmy Spencer	168.890*
35	44	Bobby Hillin	168.789
36	42	Kyle Petty	168.742
37	16	Ted Musgrave	168.672
38	8	Jeff Burton	168.672*
39	02	Derrike Cope	168.634*
40	50	A. J. Foyt	168.596
41	15	Lake Speed	Provisional
42	33	Harry Gant	Provisional
43	58	Mike Chase	Provisional

*Stood on Thursday time

Non-qualifying cars
Pos.	No.	Driver	Speed
44	39	Joe Ruttman	168.587
45	32	Dick Trickle	168.479
46	20	Randy LaJoie	168.401
47	59	Jim Sauter	168.205
48	29	Steve Grissom	168.165
49	88	Davy Jones	168.124
50	61w	Rick Carelli	167.876
51	92w	John Krebs	167.666
52	34	Bob Brevak	167.570
53	60	Gary Bettenhausen	167.249
54	52	Brad Teague	166.451
55	90	Mike Wallace	166.399
56	54	Robert Pressley	166.211
57	81w	Jeff Davis	165.329
58	57	Bob Schacht	164.986
59	76w	Ron Hornaday Jr.	164.736
60	65	Jerry O'Neil	164.693
61	00w	Scott Gaylord	164.591
62	67	Ken Bouchard	164.534
63	47	Billy Standridge	163.636
64	12	Tim Steele	162.796
65	36w	Rich Woodland Jr.	162.749
66	04w	Hershel McGriff	162.449
67	56	Jerry Hill	161.897
68	59	Andy Belmont	161.679
69	36	H. B. Bailey	160.732
70	84	Norm Benning	160.040
71	58w	Wayne Jacks	158.702
72	79	Doug French	154.684
73	41w	Steve Sellers	153.074
74	48	James Hylton	149.276
75	91w	Robert Sprague	crash
76	95w	Lance Wade	spin
77	09	Stan Fox	crash
78	19	Loy Allen Jr.	crash
79	48w	Jack Sellers	no speed

Did not make an attempt
No.	Driver
0	Delma Cowart
13	Kerry Teague
38	P. J. Jones
82	Charlie Glotzbach
86w	Butch Gilliland
95	Ben Hess
90w	Joe Heath

=== Qualifying notes ===
A trio of brothers - Geoff, Brett, and Todd Bodine made the field, a feat that had only been accomplished once in the history of the Indy 500. In 1982, Don, Bill, and Dale Whittington all qualified for the 500. Another trio of brothers nearly did the same as Rusty and Kenny Wallace qualified, but Mike Wallace ranked only 55th. P. J. Jones, son of 1963 Indianapolis 500 winner Parnelli Jones, and the only driver entered who was a son of a former Indy 500 winner, did not complete a qualifying attempt.

Future Hall of Fame drivers Davey Allison, Alan Kulwicki, and future Hall of Fame nominee Neil Bonnett had all been notably killed in the time between the initial tire tests in 1992–1993 and the running of the race. Allison was the only one of the three that had participated in one of the early tire tests, taking part in June 1992. Neil Bonnett, who entered but did not qualify for the 1979 Indianapolis 500, announced plans to enter the 1994 Brickyard 400. However, he was fatally injured in a crash at Daytona on February 11, 1994, five months before the Brickyard 400 was held. Kulwicki and Allison both died in aviation accidents in 1993. Geoff Bodine bought Kulwicki's team, Allison was eventually replaced by Ernie Irvan, and Bonnett was replaced by Jeff Purvis. All three of those entries qualified for the race.

== Race summary ==
=== Pre-race ===
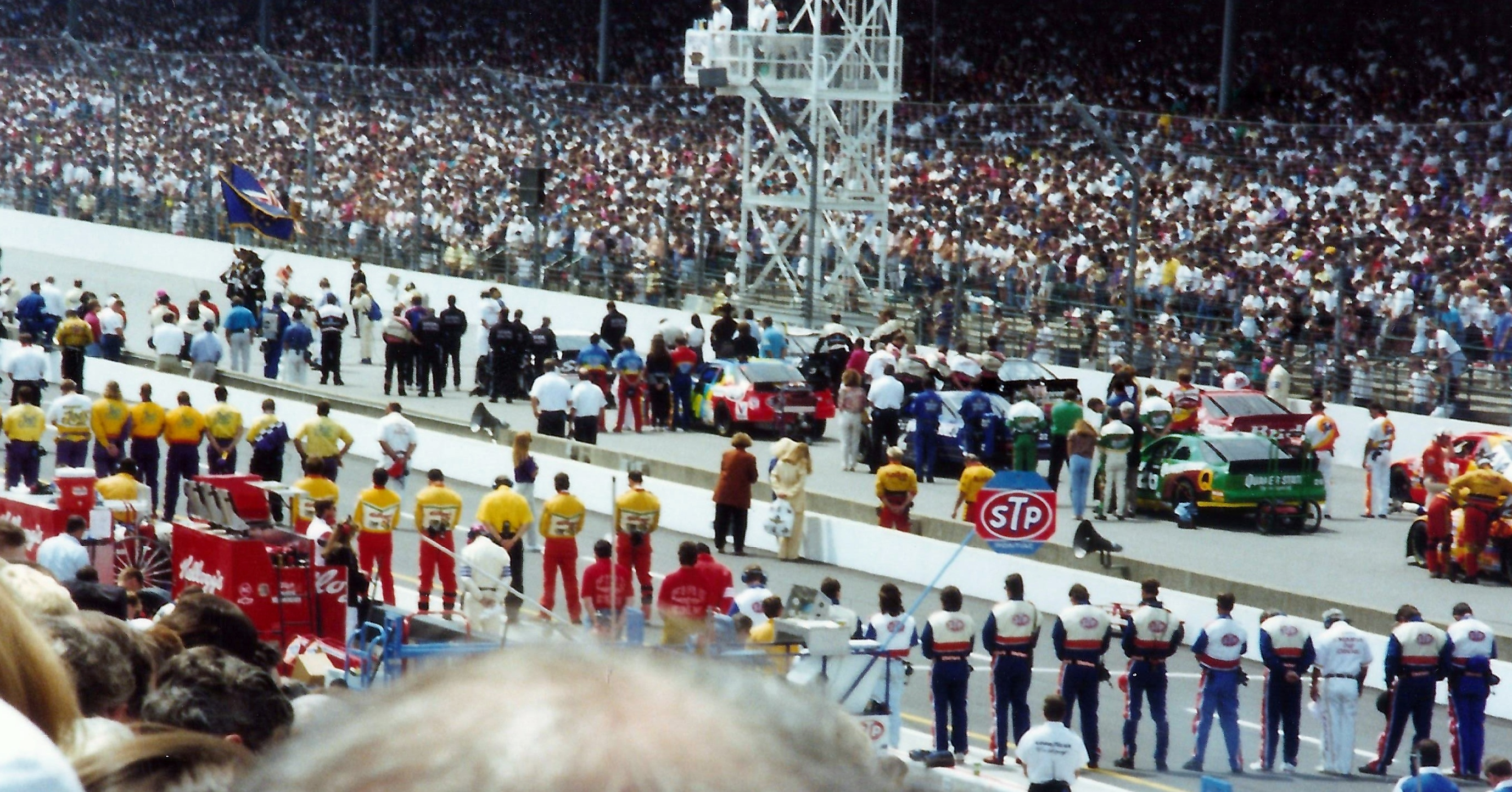
Pre-race ceremonies

Popular Indianapolis 500 fixture Jim Nabors was invited to sing the national anthem, accompanied by the Indiana State University Marching Sycamores. Mary F. Hulman gave the traditional starting command. Elmo Langley drove the Chevrolet Monte Carlo pace car, and Doyle Ford served as flagman. The flyover was performed by the 181st Fighter Group, featuring four F-16 fighter jets.

All living former NASCAR Winston Cup Champions were invited to participate in a pre-race parade around the track. Besides the former champions who qualified for the race (Earnhardt, Wallace, Elliott, Waltrip, and Labonte), those in attendance included Richard Petty, Rex White, Buck Baker, Ned Jarrett, and Benny Parsons. Former Daytona 500 winner Buddy Baker was also in attendance.

After the final practice session Friday evening, polesitter Rick Mast, as well as Ernie Irvan and Brett Bodine, were among the teams that changed the engines in their cars.

=== Start ===
At the start, polesitter Rick Mast led Dale Earnhardt into turn one. Down the backstretch, most of the field started to settle in single file. As they headed into turn three, Jeff Gordon looked inside of Earnhardt for second place, and Geoff Bodine attempted to draft behind him. Earnhardt held off the challenge, but lost some momentum to Mast. In turn four, Earnhardt drifted high and brushed the outside wall, which allowed Mast to stay ahead and lead the first lap. Earnhardt quickly began to slip in the standings. Jeff Gordon took over second position, them passed Mast for the lead one lap later. On lap 3, Danny Sullivan lost a side window in turn one and Harry Gant ran over it, shattering it. The caution flag came out for debris. Earnhardt pitted to change tires and check the damage and dropped to the rear of the field.

The green flag came back out on lap 6. On lap 10, Jimmy Spencer lost control and crashed hard in turn 3. He would become the first driver to drop out.

=== First half ===
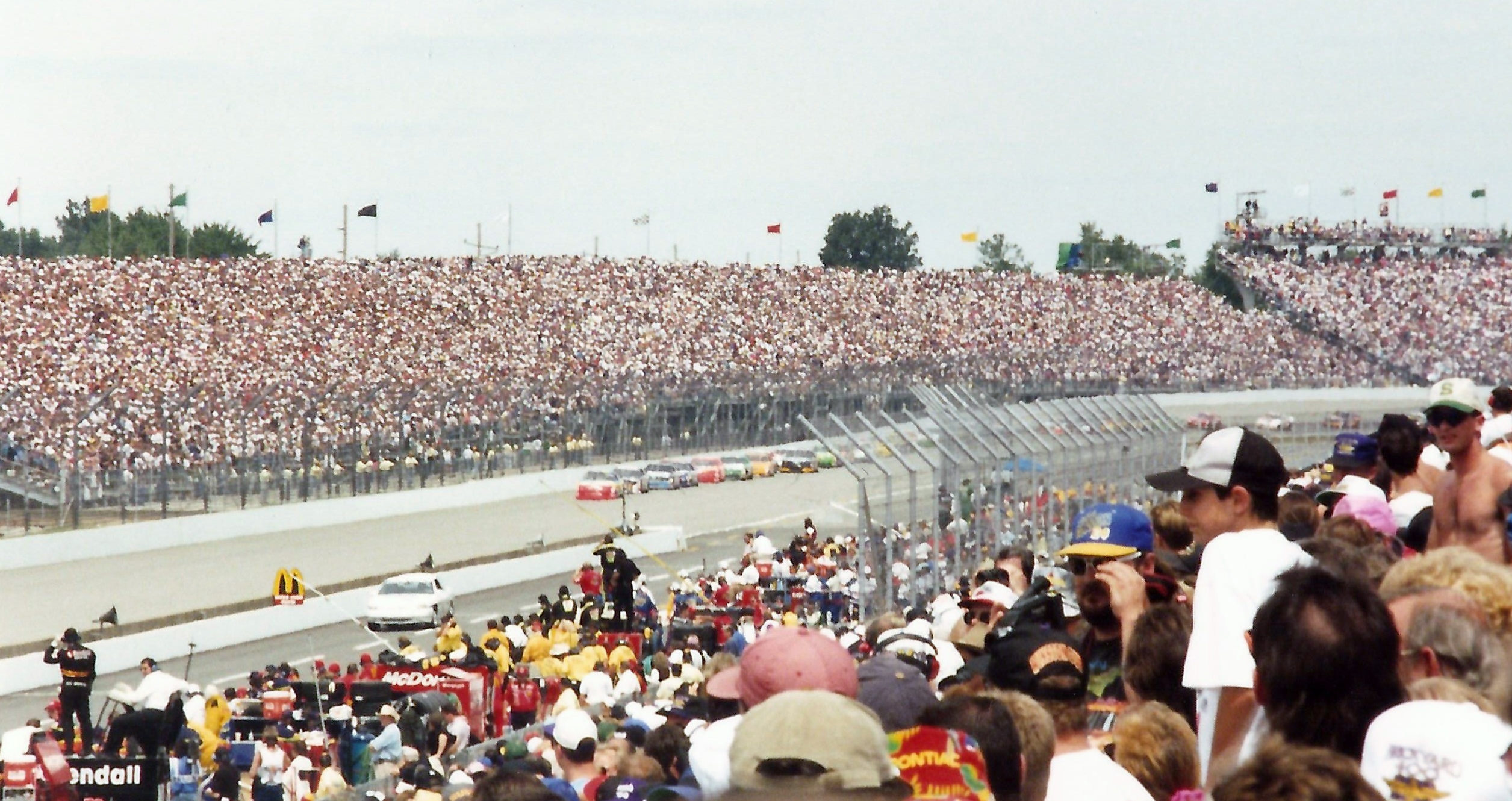
Jeff Gordon leads the field for a restart.

The first half settled into a comfortable pace, with Jeff Gordon leading for several segments. The top five were battled among drivers including Gordon, Geoff Bodine, Bill Elliott, Darrell Waltrip, and Brett Bodine. Dale Earnhardt attempted to charge through the field and managed to lead laps during a sequence of green-flag pit stops.

A. J. Foyt ran out of fuel on lap 46. He attempted to stay out and lead a lap during green-flag pit stops, but had to coast around a full lap, and lost several laps in the process. He made it back to the pits and re-joined the race.

=== Second half ===
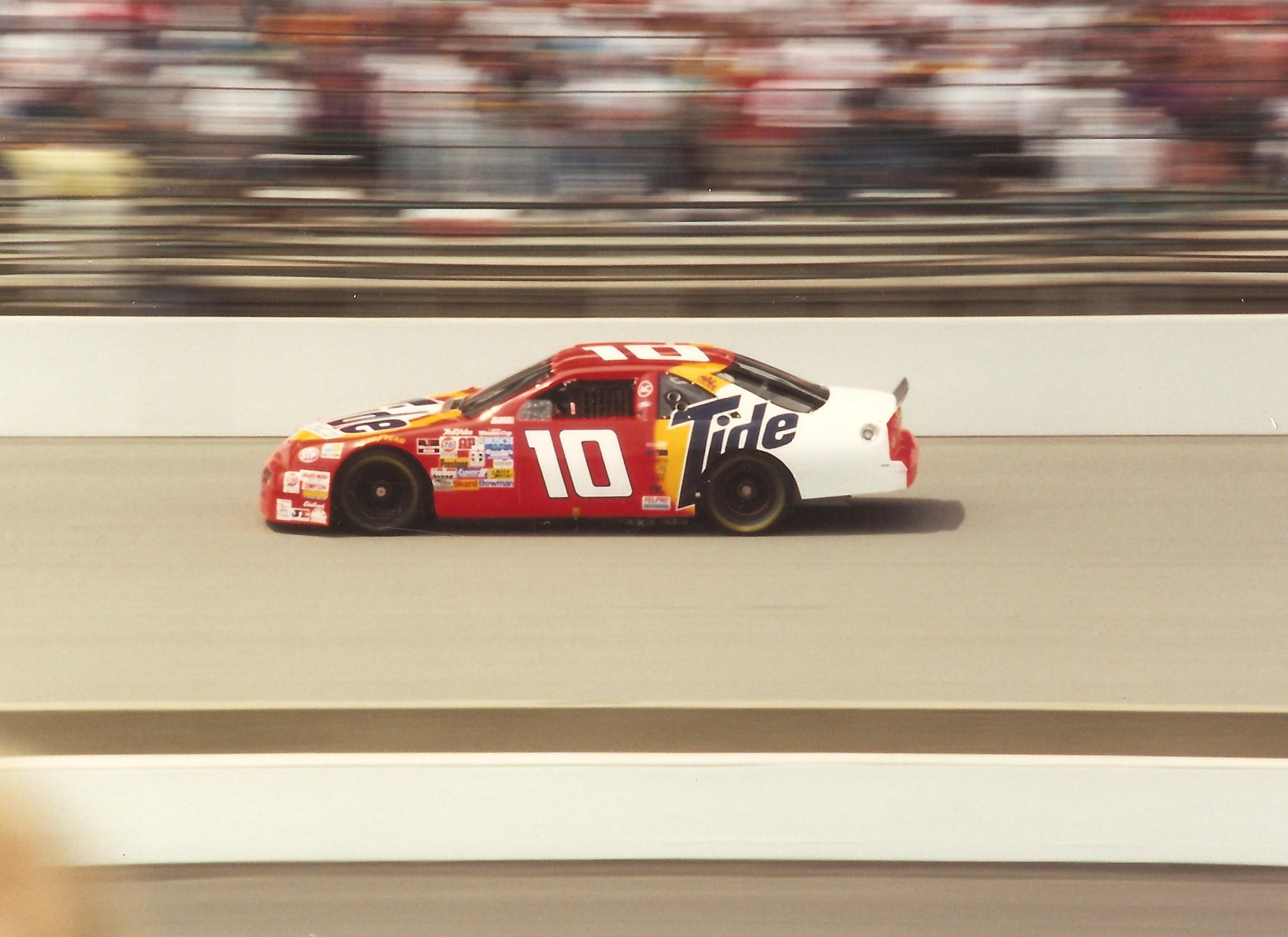
Ricky Rudd

On lap 95, Mike Chase and Dave Marcis crashed in turn 2, bringing out the caution. Under the yellow, Brett Bodine took on only two tires, which allowed him to re-enter the track with the lead. The field lined up for the restart with brothers Brett and Geoff Bodine first and second, respectively. Brett got the jump and led down the backstretch on lap 100. In turn three, Geoff nudged Brett's rear bumper, which caused Brett to become loose, and Geoff took the lead. In turn 4, however, Brett bumped Geoff in the rear bumper and spun him out in front of the entire field. Geoff hit the outside wall and collected Dale Jarrett. Other cars scrambled to avoid the crash, most of which emerged with only minor damage. After the crash, Geoff suggested Brett spun him out on purpose, attributing the move to "family problems" between the brothers. Brett later admitted he spun Geoff out on purpose, and the brothers feuded for nearly two years afterward.

With Geoff Bodine out, the race came down to a battle between Jeff Gordon and Ernie Irvan, with Brett Bodine holding on to a strong top-five position.

On lap 130, Geoff Brabham got high in turn 1 and hit the outside wall. Jimmy Hensley swerved to avoid him, but Brabham spun and smacked into the side of Hensley's car. Brabham was out of the race, but Hensley limped back to the pits with damaged fenders and flat tires. During the caution, the leaders made their final scheduled pit stops. Rusty Wallace's Penske Racing South pit crew led by Buddy Parrott, executed a 15.9-second pit stop (considered lightning-fast at the time), and he came out of the pits with the lead. Jeff Gordon and Ernie Irvan came out second and third, respectively. The top five was rounded out by Brett Bodine and Bill Elliott. By that point in the race, Dale Earnhardt had worked all the way up to seventh place.

The green flag came back out with 26 laps to go. Rusty Wallace's lead was short-lived. He held the lead going into turn one, but Jeff Gordon passed him going down the backstretch. The two ran side by side in turn four, down the main stretch, and into turn one again. Gordon finally got by, with Irvan now up to second. Wallace's chances for victory were dashed, and he slipped all the way back to 7th.

=== Finish ===
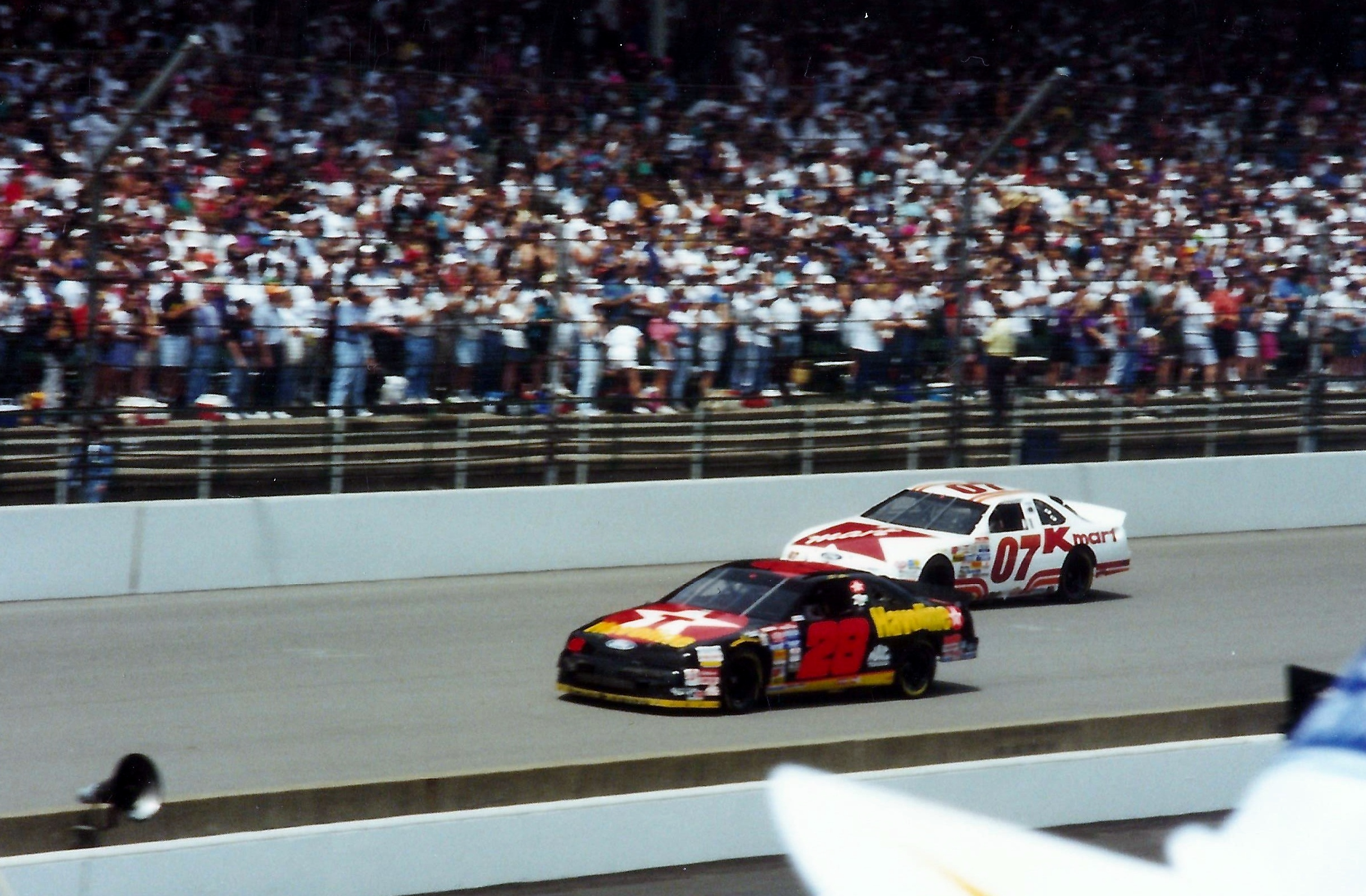
Ernie Irvan (#28) leading Geoff Brabham (#07).

With twenty laps to go, Ernie Irvan led Jeff Gordon and Brett Bodine. Gordon was battling a loose condition and decided to tuck in behind Irvan to improve his handling. As the laps dwindled down, Irvan and Gordon raced nose-to-tail and began to pull away from the rest of the field. Gordon slipped by to re-take the lead on lap 145, but Irvan stayed within reach. On lap 149, Irvan attempted to pass Gordon for the lead on the backstretch. Gordon stayed high in turn three, and the two went side-by-side into the turn. Exiting turn four, Gordon held off the challenge. One lap later, exiting turn two, Irvan tried the same move. This time the pass stuck, and Irvan was back in front.

With ten laps to go, Gordon tucked into second place and allowed Irvan to lead. Gordon's crew was instructing him to wait until the final 2–3 laps to make another pass attempt for the win.

With five laps to go, Ernie Irvan apparently ran over a piece of debris down the main stretch. He slid high going into turn one, and Jeff Gordon immediately dove underneath to take the lead. Coming out of turn two, and down the backstretch, Irvan's car looked unsettled. The right front tire blew, and he was forced to the pits. Gordon pulled away with Brett Bodine now in second. In the final four laps, Gordon was cheered on by the hometown crowd, but Bodine was beginning to close the gap. Gordon held off challenge and won the Inaugural Brickyard 400, his second career NASCAR Winston Cup victory. ABC Sports announcers Bob Jenkins and Benny Parsons described the finish thus:

Jenkins: Years from today when 79 (the number of Indianapolis 500s run prior to this event) stock car races have been run here, we'll remember the name Jeff Gordon, winner of the inaugural Brickyard 400!
Parsons: Man, oh man, oh MAN!
Jenkins: Jeff is screaming on his radio back to the pit crew, "Oh my God, I did it! I did it!"

After dropping to the last place early on, Dale Earnhardt charged all the way to a fifth-place finish. Rusty Wallace, who briefly led after the final round of pit stops, came home fourth. A dejected Ernie Irvan wound up a lap down in 17th place. Two weeks later, Irvan was involved in a serious crash at Michigan where he suffered a near-fatal head injury. Irvan would eventually recover, returning to racing in late-1995. He would win back-to-poles at the Brickyard 400 in 1997–1998 and notched a second place in the 1996 race.

Brett Bodine's second place with King Racing would be the final top-five finish of his career. It was also the best finish for car owner Kenny Bernstein at the Speedway. Bodine's second place came six days after Scott Goodyear had delivered King Racing their first Indy car victory at Michigan.

== Box score ==
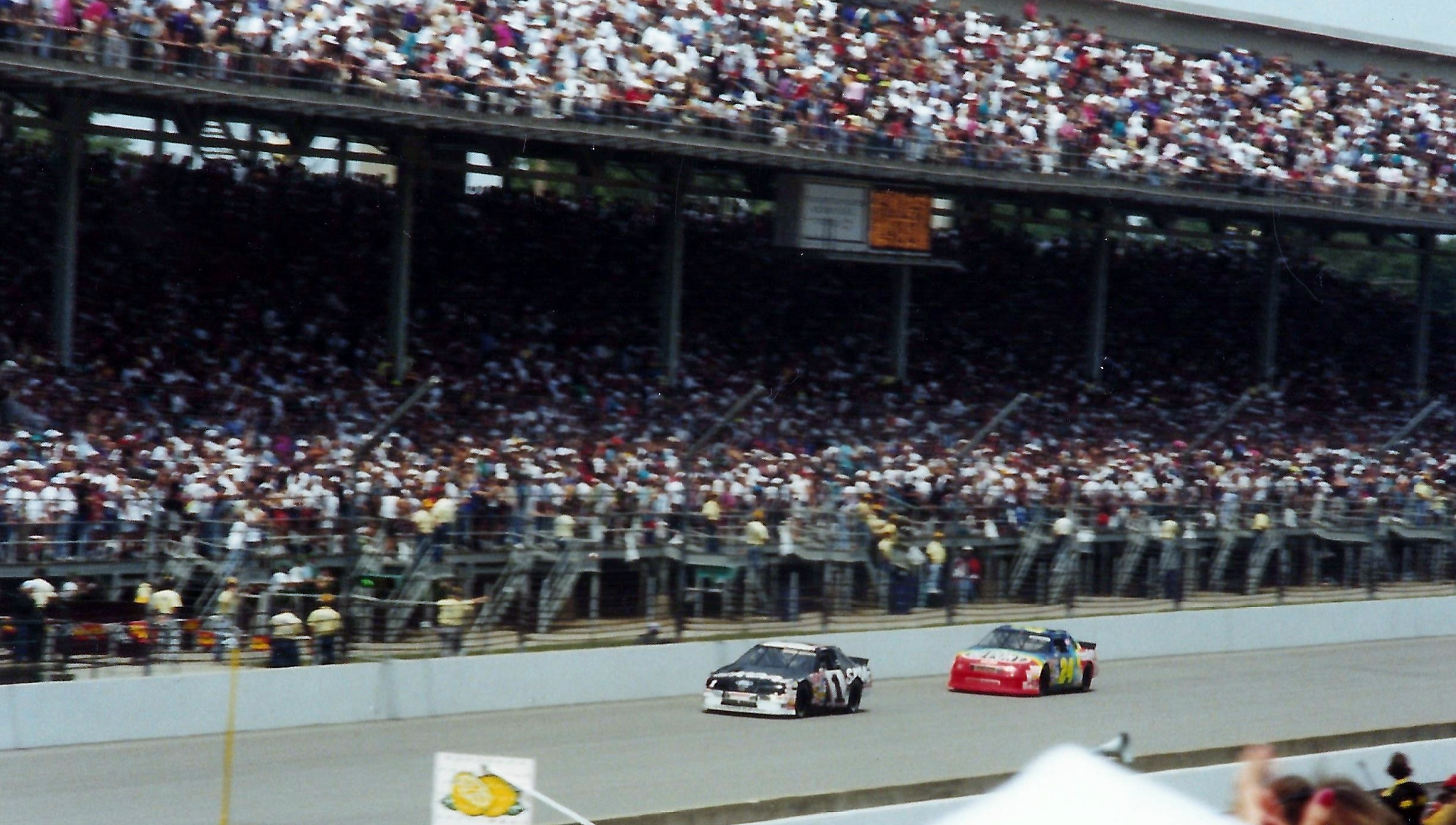
Jeff Gordon (#24) chasing down Rick Mast (#1) for the lead early in the race.

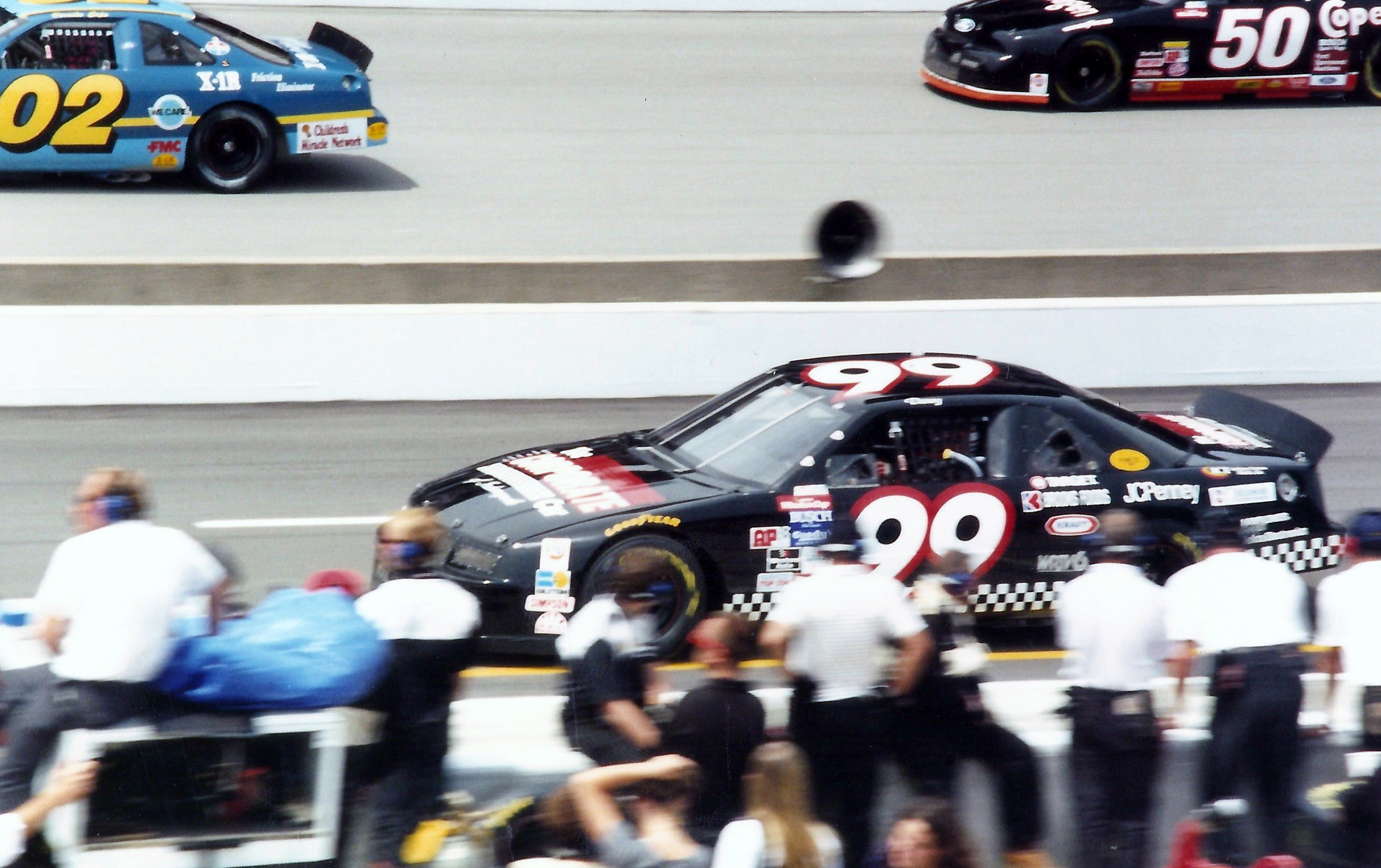
Danny Sullivan in the pit area.

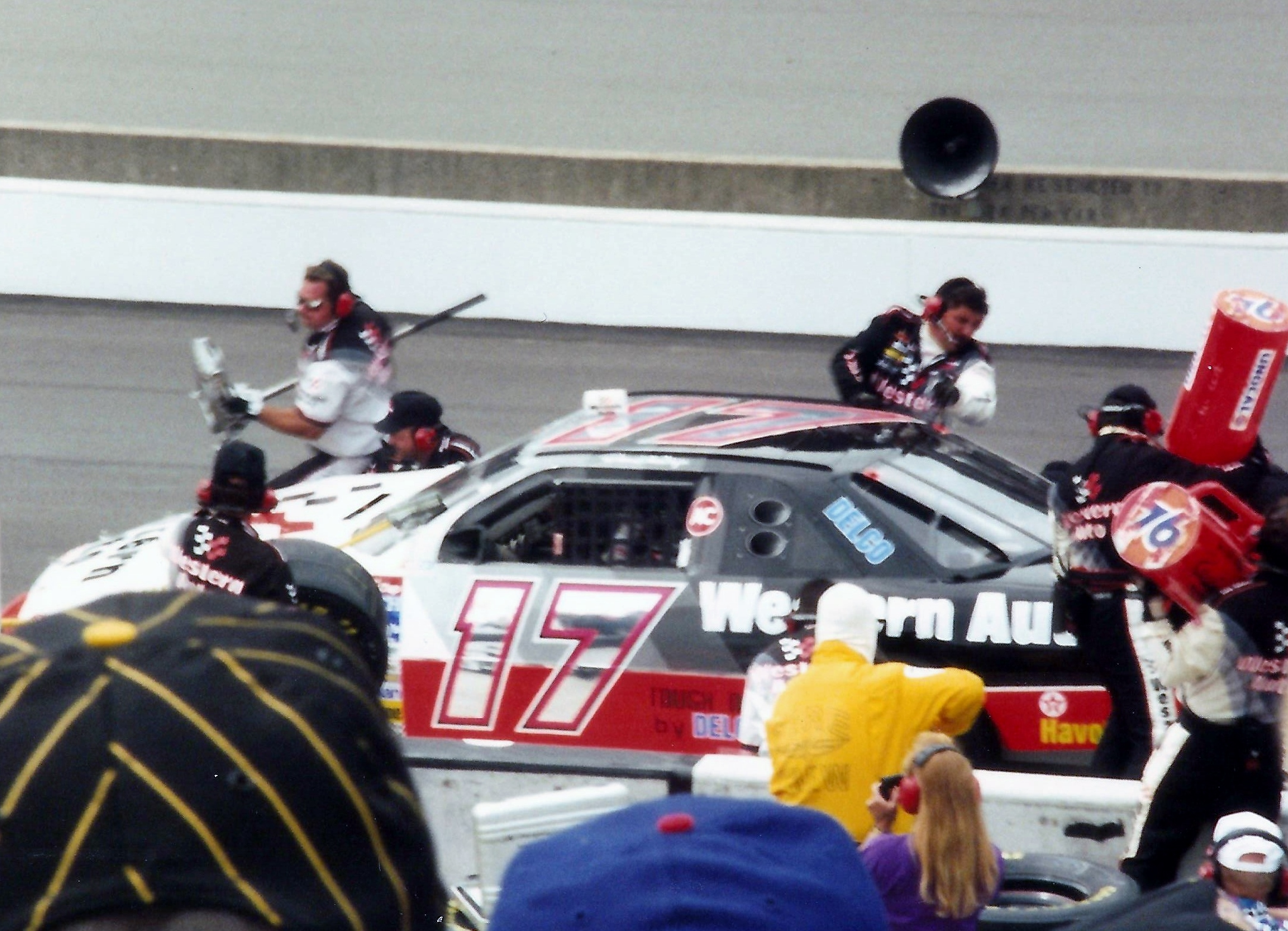
Darrell Waltrip during a pit stop.

=== Race results ===
Pos	SP	No.	Driver	Car make	Tire	Entrant	Laps	Status
1	3	24	Jeff Gordon	Chevrolet	G	Hendrick Motorsports	160	Running
2	7	26	Brett Bodine	Ford	G	King Racing	160	Running
3	6	11	Bill Elliott	Ford	G	Junior Johnson & Associates	160	Running
4	12	2	Rusty Wallace	Ford	G	Penske Racing	160	Running
5	2	3	Dale Earnhardt	Chevrolet	G	Richard Childress Racing	160	Running
6	27	17	Darrell Waltrip	Chevrolet	G	Darrell Waltrip Motorsports	160	Running
7	23	25	Ken Schrader	Chevrolet	G	Hendrick Motorsports	160	Running
8	15	30	Michael Waltrip	Pontiac	G	Bahari Racing	160	Running
9	25	75	Todd Bodine	Ford	G	Butch Mock	160	Running
10	11	21	Morgan Shepherd	Ford	G	Wood Brothers Racing	160	Running
11	8	10	Ricky Rudd	Ford	G	Rudd Performance Motorsports	160	Running
12	21	5	Terry Labonte	Chevrolet	G	Hendrick Motorsports	160	Running
13	37	16	Ted Musgrave	Ford	G	Roush Racing	160	Running
14	9	4	Sterling Marlin	Chevrolet	G	Morgan–McClure Motorsports	160	Running
15	41	15	Lake Speed	Ford	G	Bud Moore Engineering	160	Running
16	5	22	Bobby Labonte	Pontiac	G	Bill Davis Racing	160	Running
17	17	28	Ernie Irvan	Ford	G	Robert Yates Racing	159	Running
18	13	77	Greg Sacks	Ford	G	U.S Racing	159	Running
19	38	8	Jeff Burton R	Ford	G	Stavola Brothers Racing	159	Running
20	30	41	Joe Nemechek R	Chevrolet	H	Larry Hedrick Motorsports	159	Running
21	35	44	Bobby Hillin Jr.	Ford	H	Charles Hardy	159	Running
22	1	1	Rick Mast	Ford	H	Jackson Bros. Motorsports	159	Running
23	22	43	Wally Dallenbach Jr.	Pontiac	G	Petty Enterprises	159	Running
24	32	40	Bobby Hamilton	Pontiac	G	SABCO Racing	159	Running
25	36	42	Kyle Petty	Pontiac	G	SABCO Racing	159	Running
26	31	98	Jeremy Mayfield	Ford	G	Cale Yarborough Motorsports	158	Running
27	39	02	Derrike Cope	Ford	H	T. W. Taylor	158	Running
28	28	14	John Andretti R	Chevrolet	G	Hagan Racing	158	Running
29	19	9	Rich Bickle	Ford	H	Melling Racing	157	Running
30	40	50	A. J. Foyt	Ford	G	A. J. Foyt Enterprises	156	Running
31	33	31	Ward Burton R	Chevrolet	G	Alan G. Dillard Jr.	155	Running
32	24	55	Jimmy Hensley	Ford	G	Ray DeWitt	155	Running
33	26	99	Danny Sullivan	Chevrolet	G	Chris Virtue	152	Running
34	29	51	Jeff Purvis	Chevrolet	H	James Finch	142	Running
35	10	6	Mark Martin	Ford	G	Roush Racing	140	Running
36	20	23	Hut Stricklin	Ford	G	Travis Carter	136	Oil line
37	42	33	Harry Gant	Chevrolet	H	Leo Jackson	133	Running
38	18	07	Geoff Brabham	Ford	G	Michael Kranefuss	127	Crash
39	4	7	Geoffrey Bodine	Ford	H	Geoff Bodine Racing	99	Crash
40	14	18	Dale Jarrett	Chevrolet	G	Joe Gibbs Racing	99	Crash
41	16	71	Dave Marcis	Chevrolet	G	Dave Marcis	92	Crash
42	43	58	Mike Chase (WT)	Chevrolet	G	Bill Strauser	91	Crash
43	34	27	Jimmy Spencer	Ford	G	Junior Johnson & Associates	9	Crash

R 1994 NASCAR Winston Cup Series rookie contender

(WT) NASCAR Winston Transcontinental competitor

=== Race statistics ===
- Time of race – 3:01:51
- Average speed – 131.977 miles per hour (212.396 km/h)
- Margin of victory – 0.53 seconds
- Lead changes – 21 amongst 13 drivers
- Total purse: $3,213,849 (winner's share $613,000)

Lap leaders
Laps	Leader
1–2	Rick Mast
3–24	Jeff Gordon
25–33	Geoffrey Bodine
34	Bill Elliott
35	Todd Bodine
36–37	Greg Sacks
38–39	Dale Earnhardt
40–41	Ted Musgrave
42–46	Lake Speed
47	Harry Gant
48–70	Jeff Gordon
71–72	Greg Sacks
73–80	Jeff Gordon
81–95	Geoffrey Bodine
96–105	Brett Bodine
106–131	Jeff Gordon
132–135	Rusty Wallace
136–139	Jeff Gordon
140–144	Ernie Irvan
145–149	Jeff Gordon
150–155	Ernie Irvan
156–160	Jeff Gordon

Total laps led
Laps	Leader
93	Jeff Gordon
24	Geoffrey Bodine
11	Ernie Irvan
10	Brett Bodine
5	Lake Speed
4	Greg Sacks
4	Rusty Wallace
2	Dale Earnhardt
2	Ted Musgrave
2	Rick Mast
1	Bill Elliott
1	Todd Bodine
1	Harry Gant

Cautions: 6 for 25 laps
Laps	Reason
4–5	Debris, turn 1 (Sullivan)
12–15	Crash, turn 3 (Spencer)
81–85	Debris
95–99	Crash, turn 1 (Marcis, Chase)
101–105	Crash, turn 4 (G. Bodine, Jarrett)
131–134	Crash, turn 2 (Brabham, Hensley)

=== Selected awards ===
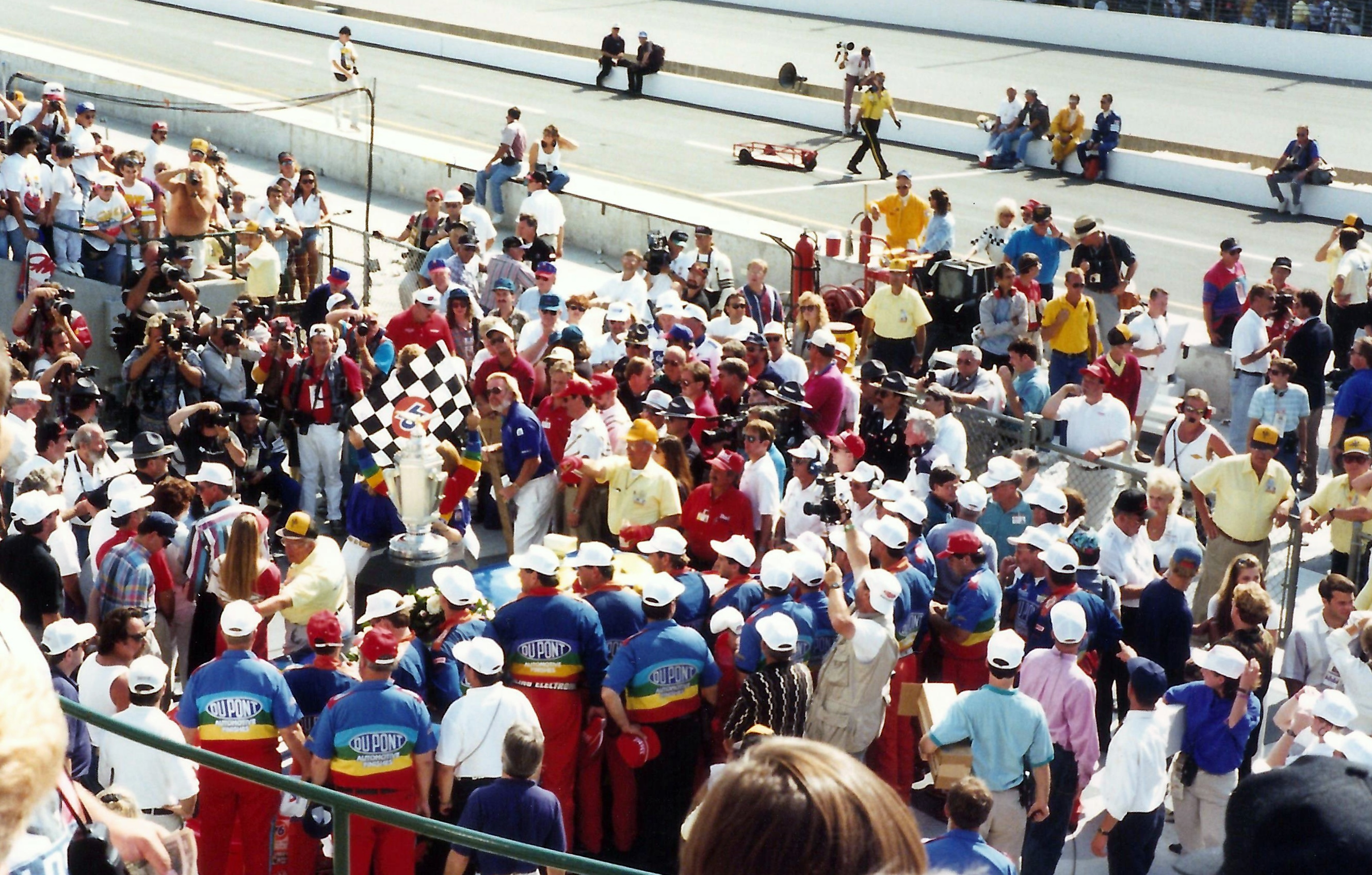
Jeff Gordon and the Hendrick Motorsports crew celebrating in victory lane.

- Busch Pole Award: Rick Mast
- Busch Beer Fastest second round qualifier: Terry Labonte
- Goody's Headache Award: Geoff Bodine
- AP Parts Meet the Challenge Award: Lake Speed (+26 positions)
- True Value Hard Charger Award: Jeff Gordon
- Plasti-kote Winning Finish Award: Ray Evernham
- Western Auto Mechanic of the Race: Ray Evernham
- Unocal 76 Challenge: $15,200 available to polesitter Rick Mast – not won (rollover)

Championship standings following the 1994 Brickyard 400

1. Dale Earnhardt, 2,883
2. Ernie Irvan, −27
3. Rusty Wallace, −268
4. Mark Martin, −344
5. Ken Schrader, −355

== Media ==
=== Television ===
The 1994 Brickyard 400 was carried live on television by ABC Sports. Paul Page, who was the announcer on ABC's Indianapolis 500 broadcasts, served as host, with ABC/ESPN's regular NASCAR announcer Bob Jenkins handling the play-by-play duties. His fellow commentator on ESPN NASCAR broadcasts, Benny Parsons, served as color commentator. The pit reporters included Gary Gerould, Jerry Punch, and Jack Arute. ESPN carried practice and qualifying with the same crew. Ned Jarrett joined the booth crew for practice/qualifying only but did not work in the television booth on race day (he had a contract at the time with CBS).

ABC
Host	Booth announcers		Pit reporters
Host	Lap-by-lap	Color-commentators	Pit reporters
Paul Page	Bob Jenkins	Benny Parsons	Jerry Punch; Jack Arute; Gary Gerould

=== Radio ===
The race was carried live on the radio by the IMS Radio Network. The broadcast was carried by over 450 affiliates in the United States. Mike Joy served as the play-by-play, with Ned Jarrett as an analyst. The turn reporters were Jerry Baker, Gary Lee, Larry Henry, and Bob Lamey. The pit reporters were Glenn Jarrett, Dave Despain, John Kernan, and Chris McClure. Howdy Bell served as a statistician. Chris Economaki sat in as a booth analyst during the pre-race, then as a roving reporter conducting interviews, and covering the garage area and hospital during the race. USAC historian Donald Davidson and author Greg Fielden were guests in the pre-race coverage, offering historical commentary. During the race itself, Davidson worked as a spotter for Bob Lamey on the radio. Davidson reprised his popular program The Talk of Gasoline Alley on WIBC for the week leading up to the event. Buddy Baker served as the driver analyst during qualifying coverage on Thursday and Friday (as Jarrett had commitments with ESPN). On race day, Baker was not part of the crew but visited the booth for a brief interview.

Indianapolis Motor Speedway Radio Network
Booth Announcers	Turn Reporters	Pit/garage reporters
Chief Announcer: Mike Joy; Driver expert: Ned Jarrett; Statistician: Howdy Bell; Historian: Donald Davidson (pre-race only)	Turn 1: Jerry Baker; Turn 2: Gary Lee; Turn 3: Larry Henry; Turn 4: Bob Lamey	Glenn Jarrett; Dave Despain; John Kernan; Chris McClure; Chris Economaki (hospital and garages)

The Speedway public address announcing team from the Indy 500 was retained for the Brickyard 400. The chief announcer Tom Carnegie was joined by Jim Phillippe and David Calabro, but John Totten did not participate.

Previous race: 1994 DieHard 500	NASCAR Winston Cup Series; 1994 season	Next race: 1994 The Bud at The Glen

Previous race: 1994 Talk 'N Toss 200	NASCAR Winston Transcontinental Series; 1994 season	Next race: 1994 Winston 200
