= List of members of the NASCAR Hall of Fame =

The following is a list of members of the NASCAR Hall of Fame. As of the 2027 class, 73 individuals have been inducted. Of these, 58 were inducted as drivers, including 32 who were recognized solely in this capacity. The remaining 26 were honored for their achievements as drivers, owners, crew chiefs, and/or broadcasters. Specifically, 22 were inducted for their roles as owners, 5 for their contributions as promoters, and 7 were recognized as crew chiefs.

== Inductees into the Hall of Fame ==
=== Inaugural class (2010) ===
Person	Image	Role	Notes
Dale Earnhardt		Driver and owner	7 Cup Series championships, 76 race wins, 281 top 5s, 428 top 10s, 22 poles, 1998 Daytona 500 winner, 3 Coca-Cola 600 wins, 1995 Brickyard 400 winner, 3 Southern 500 wins, 3 All-Star Race wins, 1979 Rookie of the Year, founder of Dale Earnhardt, Inc., named one of NASCAR's 50 Greatest Drivers in 1998
Bill France Sr.		Promoter	Founder and chairman of NASCAR and International Speedway Corporation, helped build Daytona International Speedway and Talladega Superspeedway.
Bill France Jr.		Promoter	Chairman of NASCAR and ISC, helped bring NASCAR to live television broadcasts
Junior Johnson		Driver and owner	As a driver: 50 race wins, 121 top 5s, 148 top 10s, 46 poles, 1960 Daytona 500 winner, named one of NASCAR's 50 Greatest Drivers in 1998, credited with pioneering aerodynamic drafting in NASCAR. As an owner: founder of Junior Johnson & Associates, 6 Cup Series owner's championships, 132 wins.
Richard Petty		Driver, owner and broadcaster	7 Cup Series championships, 200 race wins, 555 top 5s, 712 top 10s, 123 poles, 7 Daytona 500 wins, 2 World 600 wins, 1967 Southern 500 winner, 1959 Rookie of the Year, record holder for most wins in a single season (1967, 27), record holder for most consecutive wins (1967, 10), named one of NASCAR's 50 Greatest Drivers in 1998

=== Class of 2011 ===
Person	Image	Role	Notes
Bobby Allison		Driver	1983 Cup champion, 85 race wins, 336 top 5s, 446 top 10s, 58 poles, 3 Daytona 500 wins, 3 World 600 wins, 4 Southern 500 wins, oldest driver to win a championship (1983, 45 years old), named one of NASCAR's 50 Greatest Drivers in 1998
Ned Jarrett		Driver and broadcaster	2 Cup Series championships, 50 race wins, 185 top 5s, 239 top 10s, 35 poles, 1965 Southern 500 winner, holder of the largest margin of victory (Darlington Raceway 1965, 14 laps and 2 cars lengths), named one of NASCAR's 50 Greatest Drivers in 1998
Bud Moore		Owner and mechanic	2 Cup Series owner's championships, 63 race wins, founder of Bud Moore Engineering
David Pearson		Driver	3 Cup Series championships, 105 race wins, 301 top 5s, 336 top 10s, 113 poles, 1976 Daytona 500 winner, 3 World 600 wins, 3 Southern 500 wins, 1960 Rookie of the Year, named one of NASCAR's 50 Greatest Drivers in 1998
Lee Petty		Driver and owner	3 Cup Series championships, 54 race wins, 231 top 5s, 332 top 10s, 18 poles, winner of the first Daytona 500, founder of Petty Enterprises, named one of NASCAR's 50 Greatest Drivers in 1998

=== Class of 2012 ===
Person	Image	Role	Notes
Richie Evans		Driver	9 Modified Tour championships, over 400 lower division race wins, named one of NASCAR's 50 Greatest Drivers in 1998, named #1 of NASCAR's Whelen Modified Tour All-Time Top 10 Drivers in 2003, winningest Whelen Modified Tour driver
Dale Inman		Crew chief	8 Cup Series championships as Richard Petty and Terry Labonte's crew chief, 193 wins
Darrell Waltrip		Driver, owner and broadcaster	3 Cup Series championships, 84 race wins, 276 top 5s, 390 top 10s, 59 poles, 1989 Daytona 500 winner, 5 Coca-Cola 600 wins, 1992 Southern 500 winner, 1985 All-Star Race winner, named one of NASCAR's 50 Greatest Drivers in 1998
Glen Wood		Driver and owner	Co-founder of Wood Brothers Racing, 99 race wins as owner, 4 wins, 34 top 10s, 14 poles as driver, named one of NASCAR's 50 Greatest Drivers in 1998
Cale Yarborough		Driver	3 Cup Series championships, 83 race wins, 255 top 5s, 319 top 10s, 69 poles, 4 Daytona 500 wins, 5 Southern 500 wins, named one of NASCAR's 50 Greatest Drivers in 1998

=== Class of 2013 ===
Person	Image	Role	Notes
Buck Baker		Driver	2 Cup Series championships, 46 race wins, 246 top 5s, 372 top 10s, 45 poles, 3 Southern 500 wins, named one of NASCAR's 50 Greatest Drivers in 1998
Cotton Owens		Driver and owner	9 race wins, 52 top 5s, 84 top 10s, 10 poles, named one of NASCAR's 50 Greatest Drivers in 1998
Herb Thomas		Driver	2 Cup Series championships, 48 race wins, 122 top 5s, 156 top 10s, 39 poles, 3 Southern 500 wins, named one of NASCAR's 50 Greatest Drivers in 1998
Rusty Wallace		Driver, broadcaster and owner	1989 Cup champion, 55 race wins, 202 top 5s, 349 top 10s, 36 poles, 1990 Coca-Cola 600 winner, 1989 All-Star Race winner, 1984 Rookie of the Year, designer of Iowa Speedway, named one of NASCAR's 50 Greatest Drivers in 1998
Leonard Wood		Owner and crew chief	101 race wins as owner, 96 wins as a crew chief, co-founder of Wood Brothers Racing, helped innovate the modern pit stop

=== Class of 2014 ===
Person	Image	Role	Notes
Tim Flock		Driver	2 Cup Series championships, 39 race wins, 102 top 5s, 129 top 10s, 37 poles, named one of NASCAR's 50 Greatest Drivers in 1998
Jack Ingram		Driver	2 Xfinity Series championships, 31 race wins, 122 top 5s, 164 top 10s, 5 poles, 3 Late Model Sportsman Division championships, named one of NASCAR's 50 Greatest Drivers in 1998
Dale Jarrett		Driver and broadcaster	1999 Cup champion, 32 race wins, 163 top 5s, 260 top 10s, 16 poles, 3 Daytona 500 wins, 1996 Coca-Cola 600 winner, 2 Brickyard 400 wins, named one of NASCAR's 50 Greatest Drivers in 1998
Maurice Petty		Owner, crew chief, engineer and driver	200 Cup race wins, 7 Cup Series championships and 7 Daytona 500 wins as chief engineer for Petty Enterprises
Fireball Roberts		Driver	33 race wins, 93 top 5s, 122 top 10s, 32 poles, 1962 Daytona 500 winner, 2 Southern 500 wins, named one of NASCAR's 50 Greatest Drivers in 1998

=== Class of 2015 ===
Person	Image	Role	Notes
Bill Elliott		Driver and owner	1988 Cup champion, 44 race wins, 175 top 5s, 320 top 10s, 55 poles, 2 Daytona 500 wins, 2002 Brickyard 400 winner, 3 Southern 500 wins, 1986 All-Star Race winner, 1985 Winston Million winner, record holder for fastest qualifying speed (Talladega Superspeedway 1987, 212.809 mph), named one of NASCAR's 50 Greatest Drivers in 1998, won NASCAR's Most Popular Driver Award a record 16 times
Fred Lorenzen		Driver	26 race wins, 75 top 5s, 84 top 10s, 32 poles, 1965 Daytona 500 winner, 2 World 600 wins, first driver to win over $100,000 in a season (1963, $122,000), named one of NASCAR's 50 Greatest Drivers in 1998
Wendell Scott		Driver	1 race win, 20 top 5s, 147 top 10s, 1 pole, first African-American driver to win a race in the Cup series
Joe Weatherly		Driver	2 Cup Series championships, 25 race wins, 105 top 5s, 153 top 10s, 18 poles, named one of NASCAR's 50 Greatest Drivers in 1998
Rex White		Driver	1960 Cup Series champion, 28 race wins, 110 top 5s, 163 top 10s, 36 poles, named one of NASCAR's 50 Greatest Drivers in 1998

=== Class of 2016 ===
Person	Image	Role	Notes
Jerry Cook		Driver and executive	6 Modified Tour championships, 342 race wins, 26 poles, named one of NASCAR's 50 Greatest Drivers in 1998, named #3 of NASCAR's Whelen Modified Tour All-Time Top 10 Drivers in 2003, former NASCAR competition administrator, former director of Modified Tour
Bobby Isaac		Driver	1970 Cup champion, 37 race wins, 134 top 5s, 170 top 10s, 49 poles, record holder for most poles in a single season (1969, 20), named one of NASCAR's 50 Greatest Drivers in 1998
Terry Labonte		Driver	2 Cup Series championships, 22 race wins, 182 top 5s, 361 top 10s, 27 poles, 2 Southern 500 wins, 2 All-Star Race wins, named one of NASCAR's 50 Greatest Drivers in 1998
Bruton Smith		Promoter	Chairman and CEO of Speedway Motorsports Incorporated, helped build Charlotte Motor Speedway
Curtis Turner		Driver	17 race wins, 54 top 5s, 73 top 10s, 16 poles, 1956 Southern 500 winner, helped build Charlotte Motor Speedway, named one of NASCAR's 50 Greatest Drivers in 1998

=== Class of 2017 ===
Person	Image	Role	Notes
Richard Childress		Owner and driver	Founder of Richard Childress Racing, 6 Cup Series, 5 Xfinity Series, and 2 Truck Series owner's championships, 76 top 10s as a driver
Rick Hendrick		Owner and driver	Founder of Hendrick Motorsports, 16 Cup Series, 1 Xfinity Series, and 3 Truck Series owner's championships, most wins (320) and championships in the Cup Series as an owner
Mark Martin		Driver	40 race wins, 271 top 5s, 453 top 10s, 56 poles, 2002 Coca-Cola 600 winner, 2 Southern 500 wins, 2 All-Star race wins, named one of NASCAR's 50 Greatest Drivers in 1998
Raymond Parks		Owner	NASCAR's first champion car owner (1949), 2 wins
Benny Parsons		Driver and broadcaster	1973 Cup Series champion, 21 race wins, 199 top 5s, 283 top 10s, 20 poles, 1975 Daytona 500 winner, 1980 Coca-Cola 600 winner, named one of NASCAR's 50 Greatest Drivers in 1998

=== Class of 2018 ===
Person	Image	Role	Notes
Red Byron		Driver	NASCAR's first championship winner (1949), 2 race wins, 8 top 5s, 9 top 10s, 2 poles, named one of NASCAR's 50 Greatest Drivers in 1998
Ray Evernham		Crew chief, owner and broadcaster	3 Cup Series championships as a crew chief for Jeff Gordon, 47 wins, founder of Evernham Motorsports, 13 wins as an owner
Ron Hornaday Jr.		Driver	4 Truck Series championships, 51 race wins, 158 top 5s, 234 top 10s, 27 poles, named one of NASCAR's 75 Greatest Drivers in 2023
Ken Squier		Broadcaster	Co-founder of Motor Racing Network, first announcer to give lap-by-lap commentary for the Daytona 500, served as lap-by-lap announcer for NASCAR on CBS and NASCAR on TBS
Robert Yates		Owner and engineer	Founder of Yates Racing, 1999 Cup owner's champion, 58 race wins

=== Class of 2019 ===
Person	Image	Role	Notes
Davey Allison		Driver	19 race wins, 66 top 5s, 92 top 10s, 14 poles, 1992 Daytona 500 winner, 1991 Coca-Cola 600 winner, 2-time All-Star Race winner, 1987 Rookie of the Year, named one of NASCAR's 50 Greatest Drivers in 1998
Jeff Gordon		Driver, owner and broadcaster	4 Cup Series championships, 93 race wins, 325 top 5s, 477 top 10s, 81 poles, 3 Daytona 500 wins, 3 Coca-Cola 600 wins, 5 Brickyard 400 wins, 6 Southern 500 wins, 3 All-Star Race wins, 1993 Rookie of the Year, 1997 Winston Million winner, record holder for most consecutive starts (797), named one of NASCAR's 50 Greatest Drivers in 1998, 9 Cup Series owner's championships as a co-owner of Hendrick Motorsports
Alan Kulwicki		Driver and owner	1992 Cup Champion, 5 race wins, 38 top 5s, 75 top 10s, 24 poles, 1986 Rookie of the Year, founder of AK Racing, first person to win the Cup series title as an owner-driver, named one of NASCAR's 50 Greatest Drivers in 1998
Roger Penske		Owner and promoter	Founder of Team Penske, 5 Cup Series owner's championships, 7 Xfinity series owner's championships, helped build California Speedway, former owner of California Speedway, Michigan International Speedway, Nazareth Speedway and Rockingham Speedway, owner of Indianapolis Motor Speedway.
Jack Roush		Owner and engineer	Founder of RFK Racing, 325 NASCAR national series wins, 2 Cup Series, 5 Xfinity Series, and 1 Truck Series owner's championships

=== Class of 2020 ===
Person	Image	Role	Notes
Buddy Baker		Driver and broadcaster	19 race wins, 202 top 5s, 311 top 10s, 38 poles, 1980 Daytona 500 winner, 3 Coca-Cola 600 wins, 1970 Southern 500 winner, first driver to exceed the 200 mph mark (Talladega Superspeedway 1970, 200.447 mph), named one of NASCAR's 50 Greatest Drivers in 1998
Joe Gibbs		Owner	Founder of Joe Gibbs Racing, 5 Cup Series, 4 Xfinity Series, and 1 ARCA owner's championships, over 475 national series wins as an owner.
Bobby Labonte		Driver	2000 Cup Champion, 21 race wins, 115 top 5s, 203 top 10s, 26 poles, 1995 Coca-Cola 600 winner, 2000 Brickyard 400 winner, 2000 Southern 500 winner, named one of NASCAR's 75 Greatest Drivers in 2023
Tony Stewart		Driver, owner and promoter	3 Cup Series championships, 49 race wins, 187 top 5s, 308 top 10s, 15 poles, 2 Brickyard 400 wins, 2009 All-Star Race winner, 1999 Rookie of the Year, 2 Cup Series and 1 Xfinity Series owner's championships as a co-owner of Stewart–Haas Racing, second person to win a Cup championship as an owner-driver in 2011, 70 wins as an owner, named one of NASCAR's 75 Greatest Drivers in 2023
Waddell Wilson		Crew chief and engineer	3 Cup Series championships as an engineer for David Pearson and Benny Parsons, 22 wins as a crew chief

=== Class of 2021 ===
Note: Starting this year, NASCAR only named three inductees into each class of the NASCAR Hall of Fame, with two inductees on a Modern Era ballot and the other inductee on the Pioneer Ballot.

Person	Image	Role	Notes	Ballot
Dale Earnhardt Jr.		Driver, owner, and broadcaster	26 Cup race wins, 149 top 5s, 260 top 10s, 15 poles, 2 Daytona 500 wins, 2000 All-Star Race winner. 24 Xfinity wins, 2 Xfinity Series championships. As owner, founder of JR Motorsports, co-founder of Chance 2 Motorsports. 74 wins and 5 owner's championships in the Xfinity Series. Holds record for most consecutive NASCAR's Most Popular Driver Awards in the Cup series (15), named one of NASCAR's 75 Greatest Drivers in 2023	Modern Era Ballot
Red Farmer		Driver	Three Late Model Sportsman Series championships, 1956 Modified Tour champion, over 700 wins in NASCAR-sanctioned races, named one of NASCAR's 50 Greatest Drivers in 1998	Pioneer Ballot
Mike Stefanik		Driver	7 Modified Tour championships, 74 wins, named #2 of NASCAR's Whelen Modified Tour All-Time Top 10 Drivers in 2003, named one of NASCAR's 75 Greatest Drivers in 2023	Modern Era Ballot

=== Class of 2022 ===
There was no Class of 2022 as NASCAR decided to postpone the induction ceremony for the Class of 2021 to 2022 due to the COVID-19 pandemic.

=== Class of 2023 ===
Person	Image	Role	Notes	Ballot
Matt Kenseth		Driver	2003 Cup Champion, 39 Cup race wins, 182 top 5s, 331 top 10s, 20 poles, 2 Daytona 500 wins, 2000 Coca-Cola 600 winner, 2013 Southern 500 winner, 2004 All-Star Race winner, 2000 Rookie of the Year, 29 Xfinity wins, named one of NASCAR's 75 Greatest Drivers in 2023	Modern Era Ballot
Hershel McGriff		Driver	1986 NASCAR West Series champion, 34 West Series wins, 4 Cup race wins, named one of NASCAR's 50 Greatest Drivers in 1998	Pioneer Ballot
Kirk Shelmerdine		Crew chief and driver	4 Cup Series championships as a crew chief for Dale Earnhardt, 46 Cup race wins and 2 Xfinity race wins	Modern Era Ballot

=== Class of 2024 ===
Person	Image	Role	Notes	Ballot
Donnie Allison		Driver	10 race wins, 78 top 5s, 115 top 10s, 18 poles, 1970 Coca-Cola 600 winner, 1967 Rookie of the Year	Pioneer Ballot
Jimmie Johnson		Driver and owner	7 Cup Series championships, 83 race wins, 233 top 5s, 375 top 10s, 36 poles, 2 Daytona 500 wins, 4 Coca-Cola 600 wins, 4 Brickyard 400 wins, 2 Southern 500 wins, 4-time All-Star Race winner, record holder for most consecutive Cup championships (5), co-owner of Legacy Motor Club, named one of NASCAR's 75 Greatest Drivers in 2023	Modern Era Ballot
Chad Knaus		Crew chief	7 Cup Series championships as a crew chief for Jimmie Johnson, 82 wins	Modern Era Ballot

=== Class of 2025 ===
Person	Image	Role	Notes	Ballot
Carl Edwards		Driver	28 Cup race wins, 124 top 5s, 220 top tens, 22 poles, 2015 Coca-Cola 600 winner, 2015 Southern 500 winner, 2011 All Star Race winner, 2007 Xfinity Series Champion, 38 Xfinity wins, named one of NASCAR's 75 Greatest Drivers in 2023	Modern Era Ballot
Ralph Moody		Owner and driver	Co-founder of Holman-Moody, 2 Cup Series owner's championships, 96 win as an owner, 5 race wins as a driver, 18 top 5s, 27 top 10s, 5 poles	Pioneer Ballot
Ricky Rudd		Driver and owner	23 race wins, 194 top 5s, 374 top 10s, 29 poles, 1997 Brickyard 400 winner, 1977 Rookie of the Year, named one of NASCAR's 50 Greatest Drivers in 1998	Modern Era Ballot

=== Class of 2026 ===
Person	Image	Role	Notes	Ballot
Kurt Busch		Driver	2004 Cup champion, 34 Cup race wins, 161 top 5s, 339 top 10s, 28 poles, 2017 Daytona 500 winner, 2010 Coca-Cola 600 winner, 2010 All-Star Race winner, 1999 Southwest Tour champion, named one of NASCAR's 75 Greatest Drivers in 2023	Modern Era Ballot
Harry Gant		Driver	18 race wins, 123 top 5s, 208 top 10s, 17 poles, 2 Southern 500 wins, oldest driver to win a Cup Series race (at Michigan in 1992 at 52), named one of NASCAR's 50 Greatest Drivers in 1998	Modern Era Ballot
Ray Hendrick		Driver	Over 700 NASCAR wins (estimated) in the Modified Tour and Late Model Sportsman Series, named one of NASCAR's 50 Greatest Drivers in 1998, named #4 of NASCAR's Whelen Modified Tour All-Time Top 10 Drivers in 2003	Pioneer Era Ballot

=== Class of 2027 ===
Person	Image	Role	Notes	Ballot
Jeff Burton		Driver and broadcaster	21 Cup race wins, 134 top 5s, 254 top 10s, 6 poles, 2 Coca-Cola 600 wins, 1999 Southern 500 Winner, 1994 Rookie of the Year, named one of NASCAR's 75 Greatest Drivers in 2023	Modern Era Ballot
Kevin Harvick		Driver, owner, and broadcaster	2014 Cup champion, 60 Cup race wins, 251 top 5s, 444 top 10s, 31 poles, 2007 Daytona 500 winner, 2 Coca-Cola 600 wins, 2 Southern 500 wins, 3 Brickyard 400 wins, 2 All-Star Race wins, 2001 Rookie of the Year, 2 O'Reilly Series championships, 1998 Winston West Series champion, founder of Kevin Harvick Incorporated, named one of NASCAR's 75 Greatest Drivers in 2023	Modern Era Ballot
Larry Phillips		Driver	Five-time NASCAR Weekly Series champion, seven NASCAR Weekly Series regional championships, and thirteen track championships, named one of 25 all-time top drivers in NASCAR Weekly Series in 2006, named one of NASCAR's 75 Greatest Drivers in 2023	Pioneer Era Ballot

== See also ==
- Landmark Award, for recipients of the Landmark Award for Outstanding Contributions to NASCAR
- Squier-Hall Award, for recipients of the Squier-Hall Award for NASCAR Media Excellence
