= NASCAR's 75 Greatest Drivers =

NASCAR's 75 Greatest Drivers is an alphabetical list of NASCAR drivers. It started as NASCAR's 50 Greatest Drivers as of 1998, the 50th anniversary of NASCAR, and was expanded with an additional 25 drivers in 2023, the 75th anniversary of NASCAR.

These are the men who define the competition of our sport. Their accomplishments are the benchmark that much of our history is identified by. Honoring them in this way, at the beginning of the NASCAR 50th Anniversary celebration, is one way of showing our true appreciation for them and the invaluable contribution they have given over the past 50 years. These are the drivers who made and make NASCAR fans stand on their feet and cheer. These are the drivers who are NASCAR history.

— Bill France Jr.

== History ==
In 1998, as part of its 50th anniversary celebration, NASCAR gathered a panel to select the "50 Greatest NASCAR Drivers of All Time". It was inspired in part by the NBA's decision to select the 50 Greatest Players in NBA History on its 50th anniversary in 1996. An independent group of 51 individuals representing various NASCAR roles were asked to give their objective and educated opinions on who the 50 greatest drivers in NASCAR history were.

The living members of this group were honored on February 15, 1998 during pre-race festivities for the 1998 Daytona 500 at Daytona International Speedway.

In 2023, as part of its 75th anniversary celebration, NASCAR announced it would add 25 names to the list, bringing the total to 75.

== NASCAR's Greatest Drivers ==
Source for lists:

=== 1998 list of 50 drivers ===
Bobby Allison*
Davey Allison†*
Buck Baker*
Buddy Baker*
Geoff Bodine
Neil Bonnett†
Red Byron†*
Jerry Cook*
Dale Earnhardt*
Ralph Earnhardt†

Bill Elliott*
Richie Evans†*
Red Farmer*
Tim Flock*
A. J. Foyt
Harry Gant*
Jeff Gordon*
Ray Hendrick†*
Jack Ingram*
Ernie Irvan

Bobby Isaac†*
Dale Jarrett*
Ned Jarrett*
Junior Johnson*
Alan Kulwicki†*
Terry Labonte*
Fred Lorenzen*
Tiny Lund†
Mark Martin*
Hershel McGriff*

Cotton Owens*
Marvin Panch
Benny Parsons*
David Pearson*
Lee Petty*
Richard Petty*
Tim Richmond†
Fireball Roberts†*
Ricky Rudd*
Marshall Teague†*

Herb Thomas*
Curtis Turner†*
Rusty Wallace*
Darrell Waltrip*
Joe Weatherly†*
Bob Welborn†
Rex White*
Glen Wood*
Cale Yarborough*
LeeRoy Yarbrough†

=== 2023 expansion to 75 drivers ===
Sam Ard†
Greg Biffle
Jeff Burton*
Kurt Busch*
Kyle Busch

Dale Earnhardt Jr.*
Carl Edwards*
Chase Elliott #
Denny Hamlin #
Kevin Harvick*

Ron Hornaday Jr.*
Jimmie Johnson *#
Kasey Kahne
Matt Kenseth*
Brad Keselowski #

Bobby Labonte*
Randy LaJoie
Kyle Larson #
Joey Logano #
Sterling Marlin

Ryan Newman
Larry Phillips†*
Mike Stefanik†*
Tony Stewart*
Martin Truex Jr.

† = Deceased at the time of list announcement
# = Driver currently active in NASCAR on full or part-time basis as of the 2026 NASCAR season
* = NASCAR Hall of Fame inductee (opened 2010)

== See also ==
- 1998 in NASCAR
- 2023 in NASCAR
- List of all-time NASCAR Cup Series winners
- List of members of the NASCAR Hall of Fame
- List of NASCAR champions
