= Ray Evernham =

NASCAR team owner (born 1957)

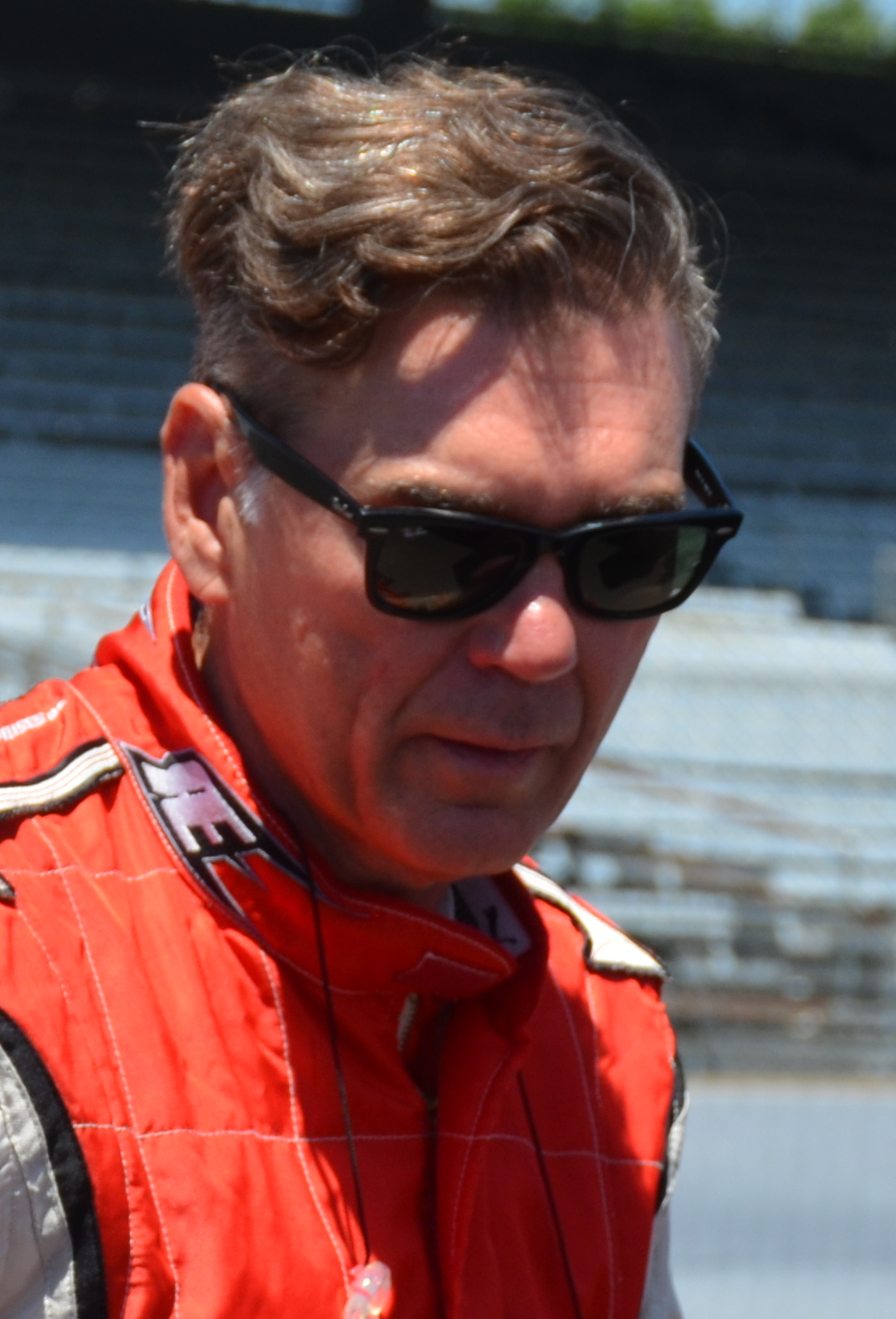
- Evernham at the Indianapolis Motor Speedway in 2016
- Born: Raymond Donald Evernham Jr. August 26, 1957 (age 69); Hazlet, New Jersey, U.S.
- Occupation: Consultant
- Known for: Former crew chief for Jeff Gordon; Founder of Evernham Motorsports then Gillett Evernham Motorsports (eventually merged with Petty Enterprises and sold)
- Spouse: Erin Crocker
- Children: 2
- Website: Ray Evernham Enterprises

Raymond Donald Evernham Jr. (born August 26, 1957) is an American consultant for Hendrick Companies, formerly an auto racing crew chief for Bill Davis Racing and Hendrick Motorsports, owner of his own team Evernham Motorsports from 2001 to 2010, and analyst for ESPN's NASCAR coverage. A three time Winston Cup Series Champion with driver Jeff Gordon, in 1999, Evernham won the NASCAR Winston Cup Illustrated "Person of the Year". Evernham was inducted to the NASCAR Hall of Fame, Class of 2018. Evernham was inducted into the Motorsports Hall of Fame of America in 2023.

Evernham is the co-founder of the racing series Superstar Racing Experience (SRX).

== Racer ==
Evernham was a modified racer. When he was 26 years old, he was hired by the International Race of Champions (IROC) as a chassis specialist. Drivers were impressed that he could translate what they were saying about the car's handling into technological adjustments.

Evernham crashed at Flemington Speedway in the middle of the 1991 season. He damaged his brain stem, which left depth perception impairment. He said, "When you wreck that bad, you don't remember anything about it." As a driver, he added, "I couldn't meet my own expectations, and that frustrated the hell out of me." His accident prompted officials to put foam blocks in the corners to lessen impacts.

== Crew chief ==
Evernham started working for NASCAR driver Alan Kulwicki at the end of 1991 after being the crew chief for Australian Touring car legend Dick Johnson in his team in 1989 and 1990. Their personalities clashed, and Evernham stayed with Kulwicki for six weeks before quitting at Daytona. As he was walking out of the garage area and NASCAR, Ford engineers Lee Morse and Preston Miller stopped him. They had worked directly with the Ford teams, including Kulwicki's, and they were impressed with Evernham. They suggested that Ford might find Evernham another assignment outside of NASCAR's top division (Winston Cup). Jeff Gordon had just become a Ford driver and he had mentioned that he would like to work with Evernham again. The two had worked briefly together in 1990, when Evernham had worked on some chassis setups for Gordon's Pontiac team. Evernham thought back to that brief time with Gordon, remembering, "From the first day we ever worked together, boom! We hit it off. We had fun, we did good, he was what I wanted, and I was what he wanted." Gordon's owner, Bill Davis Racing, did not want to hire Evernham for their NASCAR Busch Series team. "Bill Davis didn't want me," Evernham later recalled. "But Ford paid my salary to go and work for Bill Davis, because Jeff wanted me there so bad."

Evernham remained the crew chief for Gordon after he moved up into the Winston Cup Series for Hendrick Motorsports from the final race of the 1992 season to 1999. Gordon and Evernham won 47 Cup races, 3 Cup championships (1995, 1997, and 1998) and were the dominant team in NASCAR Cup competition at the time.

For his work as a crew chief, Evernham was voted into the NASCAR Hall of Fame's Class of 2018.

=== Pit stops ===
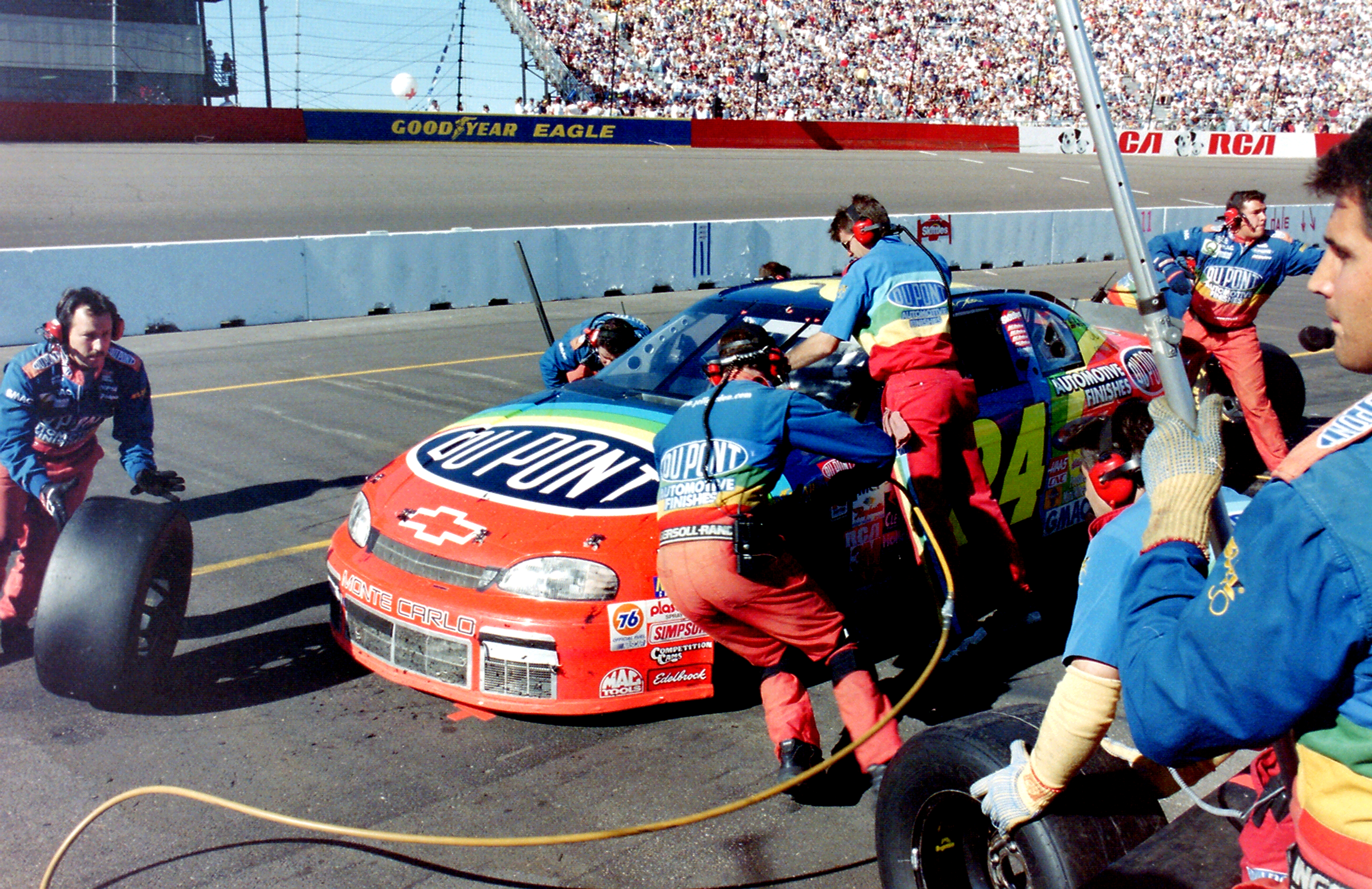
The DuPont "Rainbow Warriors" crew in 1997.

As the head of the "Rainbow Warriors" pit crew (referring to the rainbow paint schemes used on the car) Evernham is considered one of the innovators in improving the duration and efficiency of pit stops, the period where a driver receives new tires, fuel, repairs, and adjustments to the handling of the car. Instead of using the team's mechanics as the pit crew, Evernham created a group of specialists (often former athletes) who would train to perfect their assigned task (tire changing, tire carrying, jacking up the car, etc...). Much like professional sports teams Evernham incorporated choreography, put his crew members through strength and agility training, and analyzed pit stops on film between races to point out spots where his crew excelled or could improve. These methods led to the car spending less time in the pits, gaining spots on the race track. Evernham is credited with changing the expected duration of a 4-tire pit stop from over 20 seconds to less than 15.

== Car owner ==
Evernham left Hendrick Motorsports and Gordon/Evernham Motorsports in 1999 to form his own team, Evernham Motorsports. The team ran debuted in the Winston Cup Series in 2000 out of Bill Elliott's race shop in a limited schedule with Casey Atwood. Evernham was also tabbed by Daimler Chrysler to bring Dodge back into prominence in NASCAR's elite racing series, leading the development of the Intrepid R/T race car that debuted in 2001. The team operated with direct factory backing and sponsorship from the nearly 3,000 Dodge Dealers, the Mopar performance brand, and the UAW. Evernham fielded cars in the Sprint Cup Series, Nationwide Series, and Craftsman Truck Series, as well as in the ARCA, USAC and Dodge Weekly Racing Series. Drivers for the team included Elliott, Atwood, Jeremy Mayfield, Kasey Kahne, Elliott Sadler, Erin Crocker, Patrick Carpentier, and Chase Miller. Bill Elliott gave the team its first win in 2001 at Homestead Miami Speedway.

On August 6, 2007, it was announced that George N. Gillett Jr. had purchased a majority share in the team, and that the name had been changed to Gillett Evernham Motorsports. On January 9, 2009, GEM then completed a merger with Petty Enterprises and brought the team's famous No. 43 car into the fold, changing the name once again to Richard Petty Motorsports. Late in the 2009 season, RPM announced that it was to merge with Yates Racing, leaving Dodge to run Ford Fusions. In late 2010, the team was bought out by Richard Petty and several investment groups, and Evernham sold his remaining share in the operation.

In May 2011, Evernham sued Gillett Jr., alleging that Gillett did not fulfill his responsibilities as co-owner, Gillett's management problems led to the demise of the team and that in the process, he lost $19 million. In 2012 the suit was settled under undisclosed terms.

== Television career ==
Evernham has dipped into television several times as an analyst. He has worked three separate stints for ESPN/ABC: in 2000, 2008–2010, and 2012–2013. He has worked both race coverage and studio coverage at various points.

Evernham is host of the show AmeriCARna on Velocity since 2013.

Evernham works on NBCSN since 2015 as a color analyst and is paired up with Ralph Sheheen on broadcasts of the Whelen Modified Tour and Whelen Southern Modified Tour.

== Superstar Racing Experience ==
In July 2020, Evernham and former NASCAR driver Tony Stewart formed the Superstar Racing Experience (SRX), a stock car series that began in summer 2021.

== IndyCar ==
In December 2025, Evernham was named one of the three member of IndyCar's new Independent Officiating Board in a vote by IndyCar charter team owners alongside Raj Nair and Ronan Morgan, who was appointed by the FIA. As part of his duties Evernham and the other board members will serve as heads of a new nonprofit organization, IndyCar Officiating Inc and will also select an individual who will serve as the managing director of officiating that reports to the board who is tasked with full officiating oversight of the IndyCar Series and Indy NXT, which will include the hiring of personnel for race control and technical inspection as well as enforcement of IndyCar and Indy NXT rules.

== Controversies ==
During the 2006 season, former Evernham driver Jeremy Mayfield was fired from the No. 19 car for "lack of performance", as stated by the Evernham team. Court documents reveal that Mayfield blamed Evernham's personal life, included a claim that a "close personal relationship" had developed between the then-married Evernham and development driver Erin Crocker, and "sub-par" equipment as the reasons he had not won a race in 2006. Evernham admitted that he had an ongoing relationship with Crocker. Furthermore, he said about Crocker, "The proper thing to do and something her and I would like to do is move her to another race team." Evernham and Crocker eventually were married at a private ceremony in Las Vegas on August 26, 2009.

Evernham is also known for a 1995 penalty which was then the largest fine in NASCAR history. The $60,000 fine ($126,800 today) was imposed for using unapproved suspension parts on Jeff Gordon's car in a May 1995 race.
