= 2004 Nextel All-Star Challenge =

20th iteration of the NASCAR All-Star Race

Race details
- Date: May 22, 2004
- Location: Concord, North Carolina, Lowe's Motor Speedway
- Course: Permanent racing facility 1.5 mi (2.4 km)
- Distance: Open: 30 laps, 45 mi (72 km); All-Star Challenge: 90 Laps, 135 mi (217 km); Segment 1: 40 laps Segment 2: 30 laps Segment 3: 20 laps
- Avg Speed: Open: N/A; All-Star Challenge: 91.889 mph (147.881 km/h)

Nextel Open
- Pole: Dave Blaney (Bill Davis Racing)
- Time: 29.180
- Winner: Sterling Marlin (Chip Ganassi Racing)
- Fan Vote winner: Ken Schrader (BAM Racing)

Nextel All-Star Challenge
- Pole: Rusty Wallace (Penske-Jasper Racing)
- Pole: 2:03.998
- Most laps led: Ryan Newman (Penske-Jasper Racing)
- Laps led: 49
- Winner: Matt Kenseth (Roush Racing)

Television
- Network: FX
- Announcers: Mike Joy, Larry McReynolds, Darrell Waltrip
- Network: Motor Racing Network

The 2004 Nextel All-Star Challenge was the second exhibition stock car race of the 2004 NASCAR Nextel Cup Series and the 20th iteration of the event. The race was held on Saturday, May 22, 2004, in Concord, North Carolina at Lowe's Motor Speedway, a 1.5 miles (2.4 km) permanent quad-oval. The race took the scheduled 90 laps to complete. At race's end, Matt Kenseth, driving for Roush Racing, would complete a late race pass of eventual second-place driver, Penske-Jasper Racing driver Ryan Newman to win his first and only Nextel All-Star Challenge win. To fill out the podium, Tony Stewart of Joe Gibbs Racing finished third. The race was divided into three segments of 40, 30, and 20 laps.

== Background ==
The layout of Lowe's Motor Speedway, the venue where the race was held.

Lowe's Motor Speedway is a motorsports complex located in Concord, North Carolina, United States 13 miles from Charlotte, North Carolina. The complex features a 1.5 miles (2.4 km) quad oval track that hosts NASCAR racing including the prestigious Coca-Cola 600 on Memorial Day weekend and the NEXTEL All-Star Challenge, as well as the UAW-GM Quality 500. The speedway was built in 1959 by Bruton Smith and is considered the home track for NASCAR with many race teams located in the Charlotte area. The track is owned and operated by Speedway Motorsports Inc. (SMI) with Marcus G. Smith (son of Bruton Smith) as track president.

=== Format and eligibility ===
The 90 laps of the Nextel All-Star Challenge was divided into three segments. Caution laps between segment breaks were not counted. The first segment was 40 laps long. Mandatory 10-minute pit stops/breaks were implemented in between both segment breaks. During the first 10-minute break, a random ping pong ball (each ball would have one NASCAR on Fox announcer or pit reporter on it) picked by Chris Myers would lead Myers to open a giant, promotional Nextel flip phone of the corresponding announcer. Each phone had a number that would decide how many cars would be inverted to start Segment 2, a 30-lap segment. After the second 10-minute break, drivers would race in a 20-lap shootout to decide the winner of the Nextel All-Star Challenge.

Drivers who had won in the previous season and the first 11 eleven races of the current season were automatically eligible to qualify for the Nextel All-Star Challenge. In addition, previous Cup Series champions and former Nextel All-Star Challenge winners within the last 10 years (1994-2003) were also automatically eligible.

Teams who were not automatically eligible to qualify, but still wanted to have a chance at entering the Nextel All-Star Challenge were made to race in a qualifying race called the Nextel Open, a 30-lap shootout event where the winner of the event would qualify to race in the Nextel All-Star Challenge. Teams who were in the Top 50 in the 2003 NASCAR Winston Cup Series owner's points standings were allowed to race in the Nextel Open. For the first time in the 20-year history of the race, a televote was made open to the public where the driver who got the most votes from the public would also qualify to move on to the Nextel All-Star Challenge.

=== Entry list ===
==== Nextel Open ====
#	Driver	Team	Make
0	Ward Burton	Haas CNC Racing	Chevrolet
02	Kevin Lepage	SCORE Motorsports	Chevrolet
4	Jimmy Spencer	Morgan–McClure Motorsports	Chevrolet
10	Scott Riggs	MBV Motorsports	Chevrolet
19	Jeremy Mayfield	Evernham Motorsports	Dodge
21	Ricky Rudd	Wood Brothers Racing	Ford
22	Scott Wimmer	Bill Davis Racing	Dodge
23	Dave Blaney	Bill Davis Racing	Dodge
30	Johnny Sauter	Richard Childress Racing	Chevrolet
33	Kerry Earnhardt	Richard Childress Racing	Chevrolet
40	Sterling Marlin	Chip Ganassi Racing	Dodge
41	Casey Mears	Chip Ganassi Racing	Dodge
42	Jamie McMurray	Chip Ganassi Racing	Dodge
43	Jeff Green	Petty Enterprises	Dodge
45	Kyle Petty	Petty Enterprises	Dodge
46	Carl Long	Glenn Racing	Dodge
49	Ken Schrader	BAM Racing	Dodge
50	Derrike Cope	Arnold Motorsports	Dodge
59	Andy Belmont	Andy Belmont Racing	Pontiac
72	Kirk Shelmerdine	Kirk Shelmerdine Racing	Ford
77	Brendan Gaughan	Penske-Jasper Racing	Dodge
80	Andy Hillenburg	Hover Motorsports	Ford
89	Morgan Shepherd	Shepherd Racing Ventures	Dodge
94	Stanton Barrett	W.W. Motorsports	Chevrolet
99	Jeff Burton	Roush Racing	Ford
Official entry list

==== Nextel All-Star Challenge ====
#	Driver	Team	Make
01	Joe Nemechek	MBV Motorsports	Chevrolet
2	Rusty Wallace	Penske-Jasper Racing	Dodge
5	Terry Labonte	Hendrick Motorsports	Chevrolet
6	Mark Martin	Roush Racing	Ford
8	Dale Earnhardt Jr.	Dale Earnhardt, Inc.	Chevrolet
9	Kasey Kahne	Evernham Motorsports	Dodge
12	Ryan Newman	Penske-Jasper Racing	Dodge
15	Michael Waltrip	Dale Earnhardt, Inc.	Chevrolet
16	Greg Biffle	Roush Racing	Ford
17	Matt Kenseth	Roush Racing	Ford
18	Bobby Labonte	Joe Gibbs Racing	Chevrolet
20	Tony Stewart	Joe Gibbs Racing	Chevrolet
24	Jeff Gordon	Hendrick Motorsports	Chevrolet
25	Brian Vickers	Hendrick Motorsports	Chevrolet
29	Kevin Harvick	Richard Childress Racing	Chevrolet
31	Robby Gordon	Richard Childress Racing	Chevrolet
32	Ricky Craven	PPI Motorsports	Chevrolet
38	Elliott Sadler	Robert Yates Racing	Ford
48	Jimmie Johnson	Hendrick Motorsports	Chevrolet
88	Dale Jarrett	Robert Yates Racing	Ford
97	Kurt Busch	Roush Racing	Ford
98	Geoff Bodine	Mach 1 Motorsports	Ford
Official entry list

== Practice ==
=== Nextel Open first practice ===
The first Nextel Open practice was held on Friday, May 22, at 11:45 AM EST, and would last for 45 minutes. Casey Mears of Chip Ganassi Racing would set the fastest time in the session, with a lap of 29.525 and an average speed of 182.896 miles per hour (294.343 km/h).

Pos.	#	Driver	Team	Make	Time	Speed
1	41	Casey Mears	Chip Ganassi Racing	Dodge	29.525	182.896
2	43	Jeff Green	Petty Enterprises	Dodge	29.775	181.360
3	19	Jeremy Mayfield	Evernham Motorsports	Dodge	29.967	180.198
Full first Nextel Open practice results

=== Nextel Open second and final practice ===
The second and final practice for the Nextel Open, sometimes known as Happy Hour, was held on Friday, May 22, at 1:15 PM EST, and would last for 45 minutes. Jeremy Mayfield of Evernham Motorsports would set the fastest time in the session, with a lap of 29.827 and an average speed of 181.044 miles per hour (291.362 km/h).

Pos.	#	Driver	Team	Make	Time	Speed
1	19	Jeremy Mayfield	Evernham Motorsports	Dodge	29.827	181.044
2	0	Ward Burton	Haas CNC Racing	Chevrolet	29.951	180.294
3	23	Dave Blaney	Bill Davis Racing	Dodge	30.037	179.778
Full Happy Hour Nextel Open practice results

=== Nextel All-Star Challenge practice ===
The only practice session for the Nextel All-Star Challenge was held on Friday, May 22, at 2:15 PM EST, and would last for 45 minutes. Mark Martin of Roush Racing would set the fastest time in the session, with a lap of 29.978 and an average speed of 180.132 miles per hour (289.894 km/h).

Pos.	#	Driver	Team	Make	Time	Speed
1	6	Mark Martin	Roush Racing	Ford	29.978	180.132
2	20	Tony Stewart	Joe Gibbs Racing	Chevrolet	30.029	179.826
3	88	Dale Jarrett	Robert Yates Racing	Ford	30.219	178.696
Full Nextel All-Star Challenge practice results

== Qualifying ==
=== Nextel Open ===
Qualifying for the Nextel Open was held on Friday, May 21, at 6:05 PM EST. Each driver would have two laps to set a fastest time; the fastest of the two would count as their official qualifying lap.

Dave Blaney of Bill Davis Racing would win the pole, setting a time of 29.180 and an average speed of 185.058 miles per hour (297.822 km/h).

Pos.	#	Driver	Team	Make	Time	Speed
1	23	Dave Blaney	Bill Davis Racing	Dodge	29.180	185.058
2	41	Casey Mears	Chip Ganassi Racing	Dodge	29.264	184.527
3	42	Jamie McMurray	Chip Ganassi Racing	Dodge	29.319	184.181
4	19	Jeremy Mayfield	Evernham Motorsports	Dodge	29.425	183.517
5	0	Ward Burton	Haas CNC Racing	Chevrolet	29.460	183.299
6	40	Sterling Marlin	Chip Ganassi Racing	Dodge	29.484	183.150
7	43	Jeff Green	Petty Enterprises	Dodge	29.490	183.113
8	4	Jimmy Spencer	Morgan–McClure Motorsports	Chevrolet	29.579	182.562
9	22	Scott Wimmer	Bill Davis Racing	Dodge	29.608	182.383
10	77	Brendan Gaughan	Penske-Jasper Racing	Dodge	29.610	182.371
11	21	Ricky Rudd	Wood Brothers Racing	Ford	29.689	181.885
12	33	Kerry Earnhardt	Richard Childress Racing	Chevrolet	29.715	181.726
13	30	Johnny Sauter	Richard Childress Racing	Chevrolet	29.765	181.421
14	10	Scott Riggs	MBV Motorsports	Chevrolet	29.917	180.499
15	50	Derrike Cope	Arnold Motorsports	Dodge	29.931	180.415
16	49	Ken Schrader	BAM Racing	Dodge	29.953	180.282
17	99	Jeff Burton	Roush Racing	Ford	30.047	179.718
18	02	Kevin Lepage	SCORE Motorsports	Chevrolet	30.190	178.867
19	89	Morgan Shepherd	Shepherd Racing Ventures	Dodge	30.310	178.159
20	94	Stanton Barrett	W.W. Motorsports	Chevrolet	30.443	177.381
21	45	Kyle Petty	Petty Enterprises	Dodge	30.445	177.369
22	72	Kirk Shelmerdine	Kirk Shelmerdine Racing	Ford	30.951	174.469
23	46	Carl Long	Glenn Racing	Dodge	30.999	174.199
24	80	Andy Hillenburg	Hover Motorsports	Ford	31.188	173.143
25	59	Andy Belmont	Andy Belmont Racing	Pontiac	33.497	161.208
Official qualifying results

=== Nextel All-Star Challenge ===
Qualifying for the Nextel All-Star Challenge was held on Friday, May 21, at 7:10 PM EST. Each driver would run 3 laps each, with each driver having to do a mandatory pit stop within those three laps.

Rusty Wallace of Penske-Jasper Racing would win the pole with a time of 2:03.998 and an average speed of 130.647 miles per hour (210.256 km/h).

Pos.	#	Driver	Team	Make	Time	Speed
1	2	Rusty Wallace	Penske-Jasper Racing	Dodge	2:03.998	130.647
2	12	Ryan Newman	Penske-Jasper Racing	Dodge	2:04.284	130.347
3	17	Matt Kenseth	Roush Racing	Ford	2:04.316	130.313
4	6	Mark Martin	Roush Racing	Ford	2:04.555	130.063
5	20	Tony Stewart	Joe Gibbs Racing	Chevrolet	2:04.986	129.615
6	29	Kevin Harvick	Richard Childress Racing	Chevrolet	2:05.080	129.517
7	38	Elliott Sadler	Robert Yates Racing	Ford	2:05.256	129.335
8	15	Michael Waltrip	Dale Earnhardt, Inc.	Chevrolet	2:05.579	129.002
9	18	Bobby Labonte	Joe Gibbs Racing	Chevrolet	2:05.602	128.979
10	16	Greg Biffle	Roush Racing	Ford	2:05.750	128.827
11	48	Jimmie Johnson	Hendrick Motorsports	Chevrolet	2:06.363	128.202
12	25	Brian Vickers	Hendrick Motorsports	Chevrolet	2:08.077	126.486
13	5	Terry Labonte	Hendrick Motorsports	Chevrolet	2:13.822	121.056
14	97	Kurt Busch	Roush Racing	Ford	2:23.480	112.908
15	8	Dale Earnhardt Jr.	Dale Earnhardt, Inc.	Chevrolet	2:24.529	112.088
16	9	Kasey Kahne	Evernham Motorsports	Dodge	2:24.542	112.078
17	24	Jeff Gordon	Hendrick Motorsports	Chevrolet	2:24.942	111.769
18	88	Dale Jarrett	Robert Yates Racing	Ford	2:25.851	111.072
19	01	Joe Nemechek	MBV Motorsports	Chevrolet	2:26.017	110.946
20	32	Ricky Craven	PPI Motorsports	Chevrolet	2:26.522	110.564
21	31	Robby Gordon	Richard Childress Racing	Chevrolet	2:27.440	109.875
22	98	Geoff Bodine	Mach 1 Motorsports	Ford	2:27.728	109.661
23	40	Sterling Marlin	Chip Ganassi Racing	Dodge	—	—
24	49	Ken Schrader	BAM Racing	Dodge	—	—
Official qualifying results

== Nextel Open results ==
Fin	St	#	Driver	Team	Make	Laps	Led	Status	Winnings
1	6	40	Sterling Marlin	Chip Ganassi Racing	Dodge	30	5	running	$55,999
2	4	19	Jeremy Mayfield	Evernham Motorsports	Dodge	30	0	running	$45,999
3	3	42	Jamie McMurray	Chip Ganassi Racing	Dodge	30	20	running	$41,999
4	7	43	Jeff Green	Petty Enterprises	Dodge	30	0	running	$39,899
5	9	22	Scott Wimmer	Bill Davis Racing	Dodge	30	0	running	$38,899
6	13	30	Johnny Sauter	Richard Childress Racing	Chevrolet	30	0	running	$36,899
7	5	0	Ward Burton	Haas CNC Racing	Chevrolet	30	0	running	$35,899
8	1	23	Dave Blaney	Bill Davis Racing	Dodge	30	5	running	$35,299
9	16	49	Ken Schrader	BAM Racing	Dodge	30	0	running	$34,799
10	15	50	Derrike Cope	Arnold Motorsports	Dodge	30	0	running	$34,549
11	19	89	Morgan Shepherd	Shepherd Racing Ventures	Dodge	30	0	running	$34,299
12	21	45	Kyle Petty	Petty Enterprises	Dodge	30	0	running	$34,049
13	18	02	Kevin Lepage	SCORE Motorsports	Chevrolet	30	0	running	$33,799
14	23	46	Carl Long	Glenn Racing	Dodge	30	0	running	$33,699
15	24	80	Andy Hillenburg	Hover Motorsports	Ford	30	0	running	$33,599
16	25	59	Andy Belmont	Andy Belmont Racing	Pontiac	30	0	running	$33,499
17	20	94	Stanton Barrett	W.W. Motorsports	Chevrolet	30	0	running	$33,399
18	8	4	Jimmy Spencer	Morgan–McClure Motorsports	Chevrolet	27	0	running	$33,299
19	22	72	Kirk Shelmerdine	Kirk Shelmerdine Racing	Ford	24	0	accident	$33,174
20	12	33	Kerry Earnhardt	Richard Childress Racing	Chevrolet	23	0	accident	$33,074
21	2	41	Casey Mears	Chip Ganassi Racing	Dodge	0	0	accident	$32,974
22	11	21	Ricky Rudd	Wood Brothers Racing	Ford	0	0	accident	$32,874
23	10	77	Brendan Gaughan	Penske-Jasper Racing	Dodge	0	0	accident	$32,774
24	14	10	Scott Riggs	MBV Motorsports	Chevrolet	0	0	accident	$32,674
25	17	99	Jeff Burton	Roush Racing	Ford	0	0	accident	$32,574
Official race results

== Nextel All-Star Challenge results ==
Fin	St	#	Driver	Team	Make	Laps	Led	Status	Winnings
1	3	17	Matt Kenseth	Roush Racing	Ford	90	5	running	$1,044,000
2	2	12	Ryan Newman	Penske-Jasper Racing	Dodge	90	49	running	$306,400
3	5	20	Tony Stewart	Joe Gibbs Racing	Chevrolet	90	16	running	$216,200
4	8	15	Michael Waltrip	Dale Earnhardt, Inc.	Chevrolet	90	0	running	$90,400
5	18	8	Dale Earnhardt Jr.	Dale Earnhardt, Inc.	Chevrolet	90	4	running	$86,400
6	17	24	Jeff Gordon	Hendrick Motorsports	Chevrolet	90	0	running	$82,400
7	16	9	Kasey Kahne	Evernham Motorsports	Dodge	90	0	running	$78,400
8	7	38	Elliott Sadler	Robert Yates Racing	Ford	90	0	running	$77,400
9	1	2	Rusty Wallace	Penske-Jasper Racing	Dodge	90	9	running	$126,400
10	4	6	Mark Martin	Roush Racing	Ford	90	0	running	$85,400
11	18	88	Dale Jarrett	Robert Yates Racing	Ford	90	0	running	$74,400
12	12	25	Brian Vickers	Hendrick Motorsports	Chevrolet	90	0	running	$73,400
13	24	49	Ken Schrader	BAM Racing	Dodge	90	0	running	$107,199
14	13	5	Terry Labonte	Hendrick Motorsports	Chevrolet	90	7	running	$71,900
15	9	18	Bobby Labonte	Joe Gibbs Racing	Chevrolet	90	0	running	$71,400
16	22	98	Geoff Bodine	Mach 1 Motorsports	Ford	89	0	running	$71,300
17	11	48	Jimmie Johnson	Hendrick Motorsports	Chevrolet	54	0	accident	$71,200
18	23	40	Sterling Marlin	Chip Ganassi Racing	Dodge	11	0	accident	$127,099
19	10	16	Greg Biffle	Roush Racing	Ford	10	0	accident	$71,000
20	14	97	Kurt Busch	Roush Racing	Ford	10	0	accident	$70,900
21	21	31	Robby Gordon	Richard Childress Racing	Chevrolet	10	0	accident	$70,800
22	6	29	Kevin Harvick	Richard Childress Racing	Chevrolet	10	0	accident	$70,700
23	19	01	Joe Nemechek	MBV Motorsports	Chevrolet	10	0	accident	$70,600
24	20	32	Ricky Craven	PPI Motorsports	Chevrolet	4	0	accident	$70,500
Official race results
