= Squier-Hall Award =

The Squier-Hall Award for NASCAR Media Excellence is an award in the NASCAR Hall of Fame that is presented to a member of the media for their contributions to NASCAR. The award has been presented each year since 2013. It is named after Ken Squier and Barney Hall, who were the inaugural recipients of the award.

== Recipients ==
Year	Person	Image	Role
2013	Ken Squier & Barney Hall	(Hall) (Squier not pictured)	Squier: NASCAR on CBS and NASCAR on TBS play-by-play announcer Founder of and commentator for Motor Racing Network; Hall: Commentator for Motor Racing Network
2014	Chris Economaki		NASCAR on CBS and NASCAR on ESPN/ABC commentator Founder of National Auto Racing News (now Speed Sport)
2015	Tom Higgins		NASCAR writer for The Charlotte Observer
2016	Steve Byrnes		NASCAR on Fox pit reporter and NASCAR Race Hub host
2017	Benny Phillips		NASCAR writer for the High Point Enterprise and Stock Car Racing Magazine; NASCAR on TBS reporter
2018	Norma "Dusty" Brandel		NASCAR writer for the Hollywood Citizen-News
2019	Steve Waid		NASCAR writer for the Martinsville Bulletin, Roanoke Times & World News, the Grand National Scene magazine, and NASCAR Illustrated
2020	Dick Berggren		NASCAR on CBS, TNN, ESPN and Fox pit reporter Editor of Speedway Illustrated
2021	Bob Jenkins		NASCAR on ESPN play-by-play
The award was not given out in 2022 due to the COVID-19 pandemic postponing the induction ceremony of the 2021 recipient.
2023	T. Taylor Warren		Photographer who took the picture of the 1959 Daytona 500 photo finish Photographer for the first 50 Daytona 500's (1959–2008)
2024	Shav Glick		NASCAR writer for the Los Angeles Times
2025	Mike Harris		NASCAR writer for the Associated Press
2026	Deb Williams		NASCAR writer for United Press International, NASCAR Winston Cup Scene, The Gaston Gazette, USA Today, Racing Today, ESPNW.com and Autoweek; One of the first female journalists to regularly cover NASCAR
2027	Jim Foster		NASCAR writer for the The Salisbury Post, the The Greensboro Record and NASCAR writer/sports editor for the Spartanburg Herald; NASCAR Press Director and Assistant to NASCAR President Bill France Sr. One of the founders of Motor Racing Network
