= List of NASCAR O'Reilly Auto Parts Series champions =

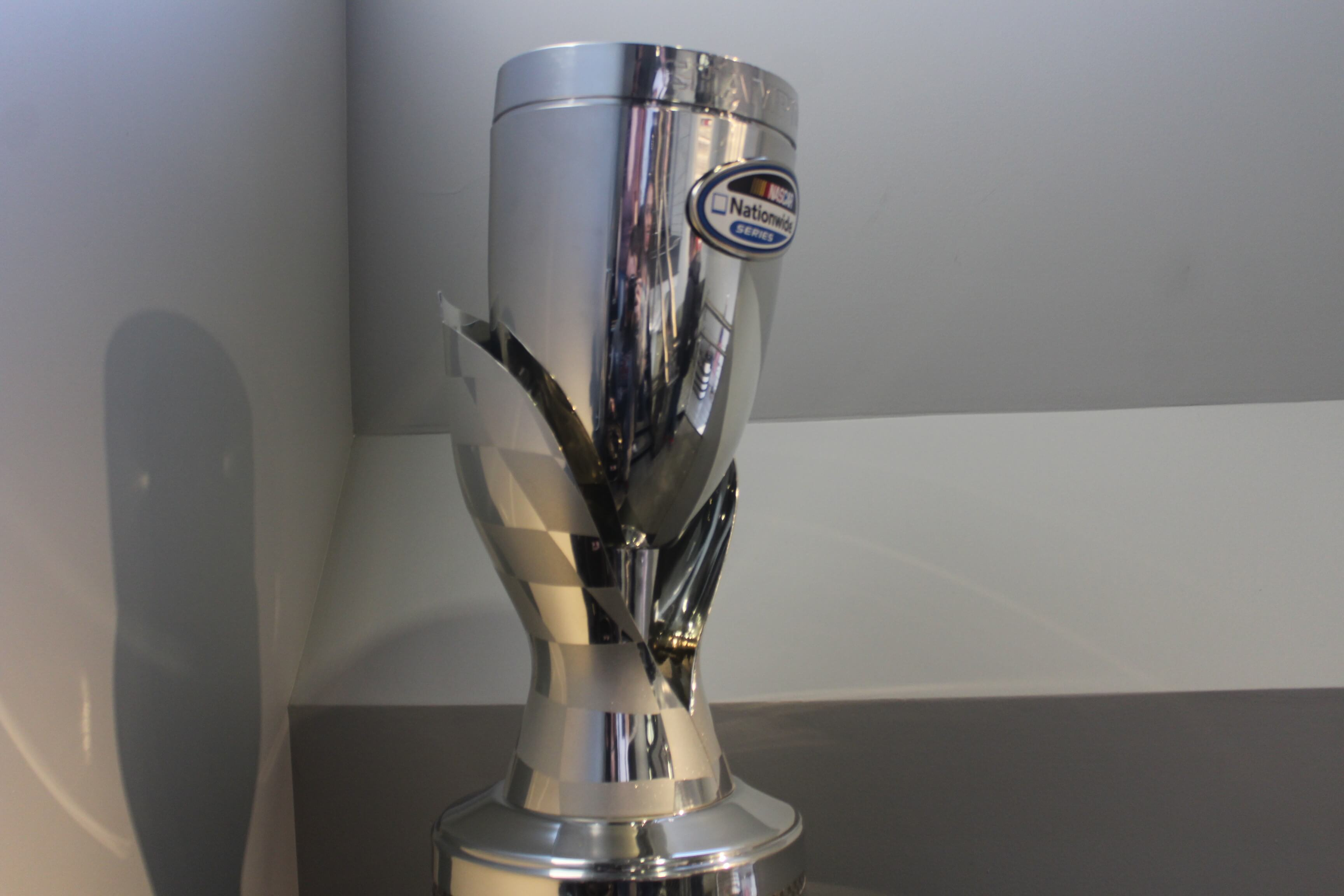
The trophy of 2010 NASCAR Nationwide Series champion Brad Keselowski

The NASCAR O'Reilly Auto Parts Series Drivers' Championship is awarded by the chairman in NASCAR to the most successful O'Reilly Series racing car driver over a season, as determined by a points system based on race results. The Drivers' Championship was first awarded in 1982, to Jack Ingram. The first driver to win multiple Championships was Sam Ard in 1983 and 1984. The current Drivers' Champion is Justin Allgaier, who won his second series championship in 2026.

From 2017 to 2025, the championship was decided using a playoff format. 12 drivers qualified for the playoffs; race winners were automatically locked in and the remainder is set by the highest non-winners in the points standings. Drivers accumulated points that carried into the playoffs by winning a stage or the race itself (1 playoff point for a stage win, 5 playoff points for a race win). After qualifying, drivers had their points reset to a significantly higher total than non-playoff drivers, with bonus points added appropriately for stage and race wins. This method was also used for eliminating drivers who qualified for the playoffs but did not advance into the next round. The playoffs cut off the lowest four non-winners in the points standings after there races; this process was repeated with the remaining drivers for the Round of 8, leaving four drivers still eligible to win the championship that season. Following the Round of 8, all previously accumulated playoff points are reset, leaving the "Championship 4" drivers all with an equal opportunity to win the championship in the one-race final round where stage points did not count in the final race. The highest-finishing driver out of the Championship 4 was then declared the champion.

Overall, 35 different drivers have won the championship, with Sam Ard, Jack Ingram, Larry Pearson, Randy LaJoie, Dale Earnhardt Jr., Kevin Harvick, Martin Truex Jr., Ricky Stenhouse Jr., and Tyler Reddick holding the record for most titles, at two. Ard, Pearson, LaJoie, Earnhardt Jr., Truex Jr., Stenhouse Jr., and Reddick all have the record for most consecutive Drivers' Championships, with two consecutive championships. Chase Elliott is the youngest Xfinity Series champion; he was 18 years, 11 months, and 11 days old when he won the 2014 title. Jack Ingram is the oldest series champion; he was 48 years, 9 months, and 29 days when he won the championship in 1985.

== By season ==
Points format History: List of NASCAR points scoring systems, NASCAR Chase

Year	Driver	Owner	Team	No	Make	St	Ws	TT	P	Pts	Gap
Full Season Points Format
1982	Jack Ingram	Jack Ingram		11	Pontiac	29	7	24	1	4495	47
1983	Sam Ard	Howard Thomas		00	Oldsmobile	35	10	30	10	5454	84
1984	Sam Ard (2)	Howard Thomas (2)		00	Oldsmobile (2)	28	8	26	7	4552	426
1985	Jack Ingram (2)	Jack Ingram (2)		11	Pontiac (2)	27	5	22	2	4106	29
1986	Larry Pearson	David Pearson	Pearson Racing	21	Pontiac (3)	31	1	24	1	4514	7
1987	Larry Pearson (2)	David Pearson (2)	Pearson Racing (2)	21	Chevrolet	27	6	20	3	3959	394
1988	Tommy Ellis	John Jackson		99	Buick	30	3	20	5	4281	295
1989	Rob Moroso	Dick Moroso	Moroso Racing	25	Oldsmobile (3)	29	4	16	7	4001	55
1990	Chuck Bown	Hubert Hensley		63	Pontiac (4)	31	6	18	4	4372	200
1991	**Bobby Labonte**	**Bobby Labonte**	Labonte Motorsports	44	Oldsmobile (4)	31	2	21	2	4264	74
1992	Joe Nemechek	Joe Nemechek	NEMCO Motorsports	87	Chevrolet (2)	31	2	18	1	4275	3
1993	Steve Grissom	Wayne Grissom	Grissom Racing Enterprises	31	Chevrolet (3)	28	2	18	0	3846	253
1994	David Green	Bobby Labonte (2)	Labonte Motorsports (2)	44	Chevrolet (4)	28	1	14	9	3725	46
1995	Johnny Benson Jr.	Bill Baumgardner	BACE Motorsports	74	Chevrolet (5)	26	2	19	0	3688	404
1996	Randy LaJoie	Bill Baumgardner (2)	BACE Motorsports (2)	74	Chevrolet (6)	26	5	20	2	3714	29
1997	Randy LaJoie (2)	Bill Baumgardner (3)	BACE Motorsports (2)	74	Chevrolet (7)	30	5	21	2	4381	266
1998	Dale Earnhardt Jr.	Dale Earnhardt	Dale Earnhardt, Inc.	3	Chevrolet (8)	31	7	22	3	4469	48
1999	Dale Earnhardt Jr. (2)	Dale Earnhardt (2)	Dale Earnhardt, Inc. (2)	3	Chevrolet (9)	32	6	22	3	4647	280
2000	Jeff Green	Greg Pollex	ppc Racing	10	Chevrolet (10)	32	6	27	7	5005	616
2001	**Kevin Harvick**	Richard Childress	Richard Childress Racing	2	Chevrolet (11)	33	5	24	4	4813	124
2002	Greg Biffle	Jack Roush	Roush Racing	60	Ford	34	4	25	5	4924	280
2003	Brian Vickers	Ricky Hendrick	Hendrick Motorsports	5	Chevrolet (12)	34	3	21	1	4637	14
2004	**Martin Truex Jr.**	Dale Earnhardt Jr. Teresa Earnhardt	Chance 2 Motorsports	8	Chevrolet (13)	34	6	26	7	5173	230
2004	**Martin Truex Jr.**	Dale Earnhardt Jr. Teresa Earnhardt	Chance 2 Motorsports	81	Chevrolet (13)	34	6	26	7	5173	230
2005	**Martin Truex Jr.** (2)	Dale Earnhardt Jr. Teresa Earnhardt (2)	Chance 2 Motorsports (2)	8	Chevrolet (14)	35	6	22	3	4937	68
2006	**Kevin Harvick** (2)	Richard Childress (2)	Richard Childress Racing (2)	21	Chevrolet (15)	35	9	32	1	5648	824
2006	**Kevin Harvick** (2)	Richard Childress (2)	Richard Childress Racing (2)	29	Chevrolet (15)	35	9	32	1	5648	824
2006	**Kevin Harvick** (2)	**Kevin Harvick**	Kevin Harvick Incorporated	33	Chevrolet (15)	35	9	32	1	5648	824
2007	Carl Edwards	Jack Roush (2)	Roush Fenway Racing (2)	60	Ford (2)	35	4	21	0	4805	618
2008	Clint Bowyer	Richard Childress (3)	Richard Childress Racing (3)	2	Chevrolet (16)	35	1	29	0	5132	21
2009	**Kyle Busch**	Joe Gibbs	Joe Gibbs Racing	18	Toyota	35	9	30	3	5682	210
2010	**Brad Keselowski**	Roger Penske	Penske Racing	22	Dodge	35	6	29	5	5639	445
2011	Ricky Stenhouse Jr.	Jack Roush (3)	Roush Fenway Racing (3)	6	Ford (3)	34	2	26	3	1222	45
2012	Ricky Stenhouse Jr. (2)	Jack Roush (4)	Roush Fenway Racing (4)	6	Ford (4)	33	6	26	4	1251	23
2013	Austin Dillon	Richard Childress (4)	Richard Childress Racing (4)	3	Chevrolet (17)	33	0	22	7	1180	3
2014	**Chase Elliott**	Dale Earnhardt Jr. (3)	JR Motorsports	9	Chevrolet (18)	33	3	26	2	1213	42
2015	Chris Buescher	Jack Roush (5)	Roush Fenway Racing (5)	60	Ford (5)	33	2	20	0	1190	15
3 Round Playoff format
2016	Daniel Suárez	Joe Gibbs (2)	Joe Gibbs Racing (2)	19	Toyota (2)	33	3	27	2	4040	2
2017	William Byron	Dale Earnhardt Jr. (4)	JR Motorsports	9	Chevrolet (19)	33	4	22	2	4034	5
2018	Tyler Reddick	Dale Earnhardt Jr. (5)	JR Motorsports (3)	9	Chevrolet (20)	33	2	20	0	4040	5
2019	Tyler Reddick (2)	Richard Childress (5)	Richard Childress Racing (5)	2	Chevrolet (21)	33	6	27	5	4040	5
2020	Austin Cindric	Roger Penske (2)	Penske Racing	22	Ford (6)	33	6	25	3	4040	5
2021	Daniel Hemric	Coy Gibbs	Joe Gibbs Racing (3)	18	Toyota (3)	33	1	21	4	4040	5
2022	Ty Gibbs	Coy Gibbs (2)	Joe Gibbs Racing (4)	54	Toyota (4)	33	7	23	7	4040	5
2023	Cole Custer	Tony Stewart	Stewart–Haas Racing	00	Ford (7)	33	3	21	6	4040	6
2024	Justin Allgaier	Dale Earnhardt Jr.(6); Kelley Earnhardt Miller (4)	JR Motorsports (4)	7	Chevrolet (22)	33	2	20	0	4035	6
2025	Jesse Love	Richard Childress (6)	Richard Childress Racing (6)	2	Chevrolet (23)	33	2	22	4	4040	6
9 race Chase format
2026	Justin Allgaier (2)	Dale Earnhardt Jr.(7); Kelley Earnhardt Miller (5)	JR Motorsports (5)	7	Chevrolet (24)	33	6	24	3	2477	14

- Drivers in Italics have won at least one NASCAR Craftsman Truck Series championship.
- Drivers in **Bold** have won at least one NASCAR Cup Series championship.

== By driver ==
Driver	Total	Seasons
Sam Ard	2	1983, 1984
Jack Ingram	2	1982, 1985
Larry Pearson	2	1986, 1987
Randy LaJoie	2	1996, 1997
Dale Earnhardt Jr.	2	1998, 1999
Martin Truex Jr.	2	2004, 2005
Kevin Harvick	2	2001, 2006
Ricky Stenhouse Jr.	2	2011, 2012
Tyler Reddick	2	2018, 2019
Justin Allgaier	2	2024, 2026
Tommy Ellis	1	1988
Rob Moroso	1	1989
Chuck Bown	1	1990
Bobby Labonte	1	1991
Joe Nemechek	1	1992
Steve Grissom	1	1993
David Green	1	1994
Johnny Benson	1	1995
Jeff Green	1	2000
Greg Biffle	1	2002
Brian Vickers	1	2003
Carl Edwards	1	2007
Clint Bowyer	1	2008
Kyle Busch	1	2009
Brad Keselowski	1	2010
Austin Dillon	1	2013
Chase Elliott	1	2014
Chris Buescher	1	2015
Daniel Suárez	1	2016
William Byron	1	2017
Austin Cindric	1	2020
Daniel Hemric	1	2021
Ty Gibbs	1	2022
Cole Custer	1	2023
Jesse Love	1	2025

== By Manufacturer ==
Driver	Total	Seasons
Chevrolet	24	1987, 1992–2001, 2003–2006, 2008, 2013–2014, 2017–2019, 2024–2026
Ford	7	2002, 2007, 2011-2012, 2015, 2020, 2023
Toyota	4	2009, 2016, 2021-2022
Oldsmobile	4	1983, 1984, 1989, 1991
Pontiac	4	1982, 1985-1986, 1990
Buick	1	1988
Dodge	1	2010

- Drives in Italics have won at least 1 NASCAR Craftsman Truck Series championship
- Drives in **Bold** have won at least 1 NASCAR Cup Series championship.

== Regular season champions ==
From 2017–2025, NASCAR has awarded a championship to the driver in the series with the most points heading into the chase.

Year	Driver	Owner(s)/Teams	No.(s)	Man.(s)
2017	Elliott Sadler	Dale Earnhardt Jr. (JR Motorsports)	1	Chevrolet
2018	Justin Allgaier	Kelley Earnhardt Miller (JR Motorsports)	7	Chevrolet
2019	Tyler Reddick	Richard Childress (Richard Childress Racing)	2	Chevrolet
2020	Austin Cindric	Roger Penske (Team Penske)	22	Ford
2021	A. J. Allmendinger (1)	Matt Kaulig (Kaulig Racing)	16	Chevrolet
2022	A. J. Allmendinger (2)	Matt Kaulig (Kaulig Racing)	16	Chevrolet
2023	Austin Hill	Richard Childress (Richard Childress Racing)	21	Chevrolet
2024	Cole Custer	Gene Haas (Stewart–Haas Racing)	00	Ford
2025	Connor Zilisch	Dale Earnhardt Jr. (JR Motorsports)	88	Chevrolet

== See also ==
- NASCAR
- NASCAR O'Reilly Auto Parts Series
- List of NASCAR Cup Series champions
- List of NASCAR Truck Series champions
- List of NASCAR teams
- List of NASCAR tracks
