= David Rogers (racing driver) =

American racing driver (1955–2020)

- Born: April 19, 1955; Orlando, Florida
- Died: March 8, 2020 (aged 64)
- Achievements: 1994 NASCAR Weekly Series national champion

NASCAR O'Reilly Auto Parts Series career
- 5 races run over 3 years
- Best finish: 66th (1982)
- First race: 1982 Goody's 300 (Daytona)
- Last race: 1992 Fram Filter 500K (Talladega)
| Wins | Top tens | Poles |
|---|---|---|
| 0 | 1 | 0 |

David Rogers (April 19, 1955 – March 8, 2020) was an American racing driver who won the NASCAR Weekly Racing Series national championship in 1994.

== Racing career ==
Rogers won hundreds of short-track races throughout Florida. He was crowned NASCAR’s National Short Track Champion in 1994 after, while driving his own late model, he won all 22 races at Volusia County Speedway in Barberville, Florida, making him the first NASCAR Weekly Series national champion to complete a season undefeated. He had wins in all of New Smyrna Speedway’s biggest races, including the Florida Governor’s Cup, Orange Blossom 100, Red Eye 100, Pete Orr Memorial and World Series of Asphalt Stock Car Racing.

Rogers competed in five NASCAR Busch Series events, three in 1982, one in 1983 and the other in 1992. His best finish was ninth at Charlotte Motor Speedway, he also failed to qualify to one Busch Series event. He ran two ARCA Racing Series races, failed to qualify to one and withdrew from other, between 1980 and 1984.

Rogers also ran three NASCAR Southeast Series races, between 1991 and 1992, with a best finish of sixth at Volusia County Speedway.

Rogers was a frequent competitor in the Snowball Derby, his best finish was 6th (twice), in 2008 and 2013. His last race was in the 2019 Snowball Derby.

New Smyrna Speedway named their Division I NASCAR weekly series championship division the David Rogers Super Late Models as a tribute.

== Motorsports career results ==
=== NASCAR ===
(key) (Bold – Pole position awarded by qualifying time. Italics – Pole position earned by points standings or practice time. * – Most laps led.)

==== Busch Series ====
NASCAR Busch Series results
| Year | Team | No. | Make | 1 | 2 | 3 | 4 | 5 | 6 | 7 | 8 | 9 | 10 | 11 | 12 | 13 | 14 | 15 | 16 | 17 | 18 | 19 | 20 | 21 | 22 | 23 | 24 | 25 | 26 | 27 | 28 | 29 | 30 | 31 | 32 | 33 | 34 | 35 | NBSC | Pts | Ref |
|---|---|---|---|---|---|---|---|---|---|---|---|---|---|---|---|---|---|---|---|---|---|---|---|---|---|---|---|---|---|---|---|---|---|---|---|---|---|---|---|---|---|
| 1982 | Rogers Racing | 22 | Pontiac | DAY; 14 | RCH | BRI | MAR | DAR | HCY | SBO | CRW | RCH | LGY | DOV | HCY | CLT; 9 | ASH | HCY | SBO | CAR | CRW | SBO | HCY | LGY | IRP | BRI | HCY | RCH | MAR | | | | | | | | | | 66th | 383 | |
| 1982 | Rogers Racing | 23 | Pontiac | | | | | | | | | | | | | | | | | | | | | | | | | | | CLT; 13 | HCY | MAR | | | | | | | 66th | 383 | |
| 1983 | Rogers Racing | 92 | Pontiac | DAY; 34 | RCH | CAR | HCY | MAR | NWS | SBO | GPS | LGY | DOV | BRI | CLT | SBO | HCY | ROU | SBO | ROU | CRW | ROU | SBO | HCY | LGY | IRP | GPS | BRI | HCY | DAR | RCH | NWS | SBO | MAR | ROU | CLT | HCY | MAR | 143rd | 61 | |
| 1992 | Rogers Racing | 58 | Chevy | DAY | CAR | RCH | ATL | MAR | DAR | BRI | HCY | LAN | DUB | NZH | CLT | DOV | ROU | MYB | GLN | VOL | NHA | TAL; 23 | IRP | ROU | MCH | NHA | BRI | DAR | RCH | DOV | CLT; DNQ | MAR | CAR | HCY | | | | | 102nd | 94 | |

=== ARCA Permatex SuperCar Series ===
(key) (Bold – Pole position awarded by qualifying time. Italics – Pole position earned by points standings or practice time. * – Most laps led.)

ARCA Permatex SuperCar Series results
| Year | Team | No. | Make | 1 | 2 | 3 | 4 | 5 | 6 | 7 | 8 | 9 | 10 | 11 | 12 | 13 | 14 | 15 | 16 | 17 | 18 | 19 | 20 | APSCSC | Pts | Ref |
|---|---|---|---|---|---|---|---|---|---|---|---|---|---|---|---|---|---|---|---|---|---|---|---|---|---|---|
| 1980 | Rogers Racing | 22 | Pontiac | DAY | NWS | FRS | FRS | MCH | TAL; 17 | IMS | FRS | MCH | | | | | | | | | | | | NA | - | |
| 1981 | Rogers Racing | 02 | Pontiac | DAY; DNQ | DSP | FRS | FRS | BFS | TAL | FRS | COR | | | | | | | | | | | | | NA | - | |
| 1983 | Finney Racing | 80 | Buick | DAY | NSV | TAL | LPR | LPR | ISF | IRP | SSP | FRS | BFS | WIN | LPR | POC | TAL; Wth | MCS | FRS | MIL | DSF | ZAN | SND | NA | - | |
| 1984 | Finney Racing | 80 | Buick | DAY; 18 | ATL | TAL | CSP | SMS | FRS | MCS | LCS | IRP | TAL | FRS | ISF | DSF | TOL | MGR | | | | | | NA | - | |
