= Randy Tissot =

American racing driver (1944–2013)

- Born: Randall Lee Tissot; March 30, 1944; Akron, Ohio, U.S.
- Died: August 15, 2013 (aged 69)

NASCAR Cup Series career
- 13 races run over 3 years
- Best finish: 44th (1973)
- First race: 1973 Dixie 500 (Atlanta)
- Last race: 1975 Delaware 500 (Dover)
Wins	Top tens	Poles
0	0	0

NASCAR O'Reilly Auto Parts Series career
- 10 races run over 2 years
- Best finish: 32nd (1982)
- First race: 1982 Southeastern 150 (Bristol)
- Last race: 1983 Mello Yello 300 (Charlotte)
Wins	Top tens	Poles
0	2	0

Randall Lee Tissot (/tiːˈsoʊ/ tee-SOH; March 30, 1944 – August 15, 2013) was an American stock car racing driver from Akron, Ohio. He made 13 NASCAR Winston Cup Series starts in his career, with a best finish of 15th place at Darlington Raceway in 1973 and 1975, and at Dover International Speedway in 1975. He also made ten starts in the Budweiser Late Model Sportsman Series in 1982 and 1983, scoring two top-tens and a best finish of sixth at Bristol Motor Speedway.

== Motorsports career results ==
=== NASCAR ===
(key) (Bold – Pole position awarded by qualifying time. Italics – Pole position earned by points standings or practice time. * – Most laps led.)

==== Winston Cup Series ====
NASCAR Winston Cup Series results
Year	Team	No.	Make	1	2	3	4	5	6	7	8	9	10	11	12	13	14	15	16	17	18	19	20	21	22	23	24	25	26	27	28	29	30	NWCC	Pts	Ref
1973	Tilitco Enterprises	32	Chevy	RSD	DAY	RCH	CAR	BRI	ATL	NWS	DAR	MAR	TAL	NSV	CLT	DOV	TWS	RSD	MCH	DAY	BRI	ATL; 16												44th	887.85	
1973	Tilitco Enterprises	74	Chevy																				TAL; 20	NSV	DAR; 15	RCH	DOV	NWS	MAR	CLT	CAR			44th	887.85	
1974	Tilitco Enterprises	74	Chevy	RSD	DAY; DNQ	RCH	CAR	BRI	ATL	DAR; 23	NWS	MAR	TAL; 32	NSV	DOV	CLT; 35	RSD	MCH	DAY	BRI	NSV	ATL	POC	TAL	MCH	DAR	RCH	DOV	NWS	MAR	CLT	CAR	ONT	70th	8.31	
1975	Tilitco Enterprises	74	Chevy	RSD	DAY; 29	RCH	CAR	BRI	ATL	NWS	DAR; 29	MAR	TAL; 28	NSV	DOV	CLT	RSD	MCH	DAY; 16	NSV	POC	TAL; 50	MCH	DAR; 15	DOV; 15	NWS	MAR	CLT	RCH	CAR	BRI	ATL	ONT	51st	364	

===== Daytona 500 =====
Year	Team	Manufacturer	Start	Finish
1974	Tilitco Enterprises	Chevrolet	DNQ	
1975	Tilitco Enterprises	Chevrolet	18	29

==== Budweiser Late Model Sportsman Series ====
NASCAR Budweiser Late Model Sportsman Series results
Year	Team	No.	Make	1	2	3	4	5	6	7	8	9	10	11	12	13	14	15	16	17	18	19	20	21	22	23	24	25	26	27	28	29	30	31	32	33	34	35	NBLMC	Pts	Ref
1982		47	Pontiac	DAY	RCH	BRI; 19	MAR	DAR																	IRP; 8	BRI; 6	HCY	RCH											32nd	825	
1982									HCY; 11	SBO	CRW	RCH	LGY	DOV	HCY	CLT	ASH	HCY	SBO	CAR	CRW	SBO	HCY; 19	LGY							HCY; 20	MAR							32nd	825	
1982	Tilitco Enterprises	47	Pontiac																										MAR; 25	CLT									32nd	825	
1983		85	Pontiac	DAY; 37	RCH	CAR	HCY; 11	MAR	NWS	SBO	GPS	LGY	DOV	BRI																									69th	297	
1983		47	Pontiac												CLT; 16	SBO	HCY	ROU	SBO	ROU	CRW	ROU	SBO	HCY	LGY	IRP	GPS	BRI	HCY	DAR	RCH	NWS	SBO	MAR	ROU	CLT	HCY	MAR	69th	297	
