= Tommy Houston =

American racing driver (born 1945)

- Houston in 1974
- Born: January 29, 1945 (age 81); Hickory, North Carolina, U.S.

NASCAR Cup Series career
- 13 races run over 4 years
- Best finish: 48th (1980)
- First race: 1980 Richmond 400 (Richmond)
- Last race: 1985 Southern 500 (Darlington)
Wins	Top tens	Poles
0	0	0

NASCAR O'Reilly Auto Parts Series career
- 417 races run over 15 years
- Best finish: 2nd (1989)
- First race: 1982 Goody's 300 (Daytona)
- Last race: 1996 AC Delco 200 (Rockingham)
- First win: 1982 Eastern 150 (Richmond)
- Last win: 1992 Mountain Dew 400 (Hickory)
Wins	Top tens	Poles
24	198	18

NASCAR FedEx Freight Truck Series career
- 1 race run over 1 year
- Best finish: 117th (1999)
- First race: 1999 The Orleans 250 (Las Vegas)
Wins	Top tens	Poles
0	0	0
- Statistics up to date as of February 26, 2007.

Tommy Houston (born January 29, 1945) is an American retired NASCAR Busch Series driver. Over his career, Houston and Jack Ingram became known as the pair of journeymen drivers that helped that series grow throughout the 1980s and early 1990s.

Houston was born in Hickory, North Carolina, and was in the NASCAR Late Model Sportsman division, winning nearly 150 races before the series was formed into the Busch Series.

== Busch Series career ==
Houston made the inaugural race of the Busch Series at the 1982 Daytona race. Driving the No. 27 Kings Inn Chevy for Mike Day, Houston started 23rd and finished the race in ninth position. The next week, Houston started fifteenth at the series' first ever short track race, at Richmond Fairgrounds Raceway. From there, Houston moved solidly through the field and held off Bubba Nissen for the win. After problems at Bristol, Houston put together a run of five top-ten finishes. However, inconsistency through the year cost him. He did not finish the last three races as well as seven others. That cost him any shot at the title. At Hickory Speedway in August, however, Houston held off Tommy Ellis for his second career win, after starting fourth. All told, he finished fourth in the 1982 Busch Series points.

In 1983, Houston began running his No. 6 full-time. He was able to reduce his DNF count from ten to six. He had four more top-ten finishes. He won two races at Orange County Speedway, and one each at Indianapolis Raceway Park and Hickory. He also finished second three times. His sponsors over the years included Southern Biscuit Flour, Roses Stores, Suburban Propane and Red Devil Paints.

Houston snapped a fifty-race winless streak at his home track on Easter Sunday in 1992 after the death of his father the day before. Houston came from three laps down to overtake Bobby Labonte for the win. The USA Today headline read "Divine Intervention".

Houston's family was very involved in his efforts. He was inducted into the National Motorsports Press Association Hall of Fame in 2008.

== Personal life ==
Houston's son, Andy Houston, raced in all of the three major NASCAR series. Additionally, he is the uncle of Teresa Earnhardt, wife of Dale Earnhardt.

== Motorsports career results ==
=== NASCAR ===
(key) (Bold – Pole position awarded by qualifying time. Italics – Pole position earned by points standings or practice time. * – Most laps led.)

==== Winston Cup Series ====
NASCAR Winston Cup Series results
Year	Team	No.	Make	1	2	3	4	5	6	7	8	9	10	11	12	13	14	15	16	17	18	19	20	21	22	23	24	25	26	27	28	29	30	31	NWCC	Pts	Ref
1980	Junior Miller Racing	95	Chevy	RSD	DAY	RCH; 17	CAR	ATL	BRI; 15	DAR	NWS; 31	MAR	TAL	NSV	DOV	CLT; 24	TWS	RSD	MCH	DAY	NSV	POC	TAL	MCH	BRI	DAR	RCH	DOV	NWS	MAR	CLT	CAR	ATL	ONT	48th	396	
1981	Hamby Motorsports	17	Buick	RSD	DAY	RCH	CAR	ATL	BRI	NWS; 20	DAR		TAL; 12	NSV	DOV																				52nd	-	
1981	Hamby Motorsports	17	Chevy									MAR; 20									NSV; 19	POC	TAL	MCH	BRI	DAR	RCH	DOV	MAR; 12						52nd	-	
1981	Hamby Motorsports	17	Olds													CLT; DNQ	TWS	RSD	MCH	DAY; 27										NWS; 11	CLT	CAR	ATL	RSD	52nd	-	
1982	Ulrich Racing	40	Buick	DAY	RCH; 25	BRI	ATL	CAR	DAR	NWS	MAR	TAL	NSV	DOV	CLT	POC	RSD	MCH	DAY	NSV	POC	TAL	MCH	BRI	DAR	RCH	DOV	NWS	CLT	MAR	CAR	ATL	RSD		88th	88	
1985	Houston Racing	32	Chevy	DAY	RCH	CAR	ATL	BRI	DAR	NWS	MAR	TAL	DOV	CLT	RSD	POC	MCH	DAY	POC	TAL	MCH	BRI	DAR; 36	RCH	DOV	MAR	NWS	CLT	CAR	ATL	RSD				91st	55	

==== Busch Series ====
NASCAR Busch Series results
Year	Team	No.	Make	1	2	3	4	5	6	7	8	9	10	11	12	13	14	15	16	17	18	19	20	21	22	23	24	25	26	27	28	29	30	31	32	33	34	35	NBSC	Pts	Ref
1982	Mike Day	27	Chevy	DAY; 9			MAR; 9	DAR; 9	HCY; 4	SBO; 6	CRW; 4	RCH; 20	LGY; 14		HCY; 5		ASH; 12	HCY; 7	SBO; 15	CAR; 33	CRW; 23	SBO; 5	HCY; 1	LGY; 4			HCY; 3	RCH; 4			HCY; 15	MAR; 32							4th	3827	
1982	Mike Day	6	Pontiac		RCH; 1											CLT; 31																							4th	3827	
1982		7	Pontiac			BRI; 28																																	4th	3827	
1982	Mike Day	6	Chevy											DOV; 6											IRP; 3	BRI; 10			MAR; 3										4th	3827	
1982	Mike Day	6	Olds																											CLT; 32									4th	3827	
1983	Mike Day	6	Olds	DAY; 10		CAR; 7	HCY; 15																							DAR; 8						CLT; 21			3rd	4933	
1983	Mike Day	6	Chevy		RCH; 2			MAR; 6	NWS; 2	SBO; 23	GPS; 4	LGY; 4	DOV; 16	BRI; 5	CLT; 8	SBO; 22	HCY; 17	ROU; 5	SBO; 14	ROU; 1	CRW; 4	ROU; 1	SBO; 6	HCY; 11	LGY; 17	IRP; 1	GPS; 18	BRI; 6	HCY; 1		RCH; 4	NWS; 2	SBO; 8	MAR; 18	ROU; 3		**HCY**; 23	MAR; 14	3rd	4933	
1984	Mike Day	6	Olds	DAY; 30		CAR; 5			DAR; 6					DOV; 5	CLT; 41							IRP; 21				DAR; 34			CLT; 20		CAR; 5	MAR; 10							3rd	4070	
1984	Mike Day	6	Chevy		RCH; 8		HCY; 2	MAR; 18		ROU; 4	NSV; 3	LGY; 10	MLW; 7			SBO; 3	HCY; 1*	**ROU**; 2	SBO; 3	**ROU**; 2	**HCY**; 7*		LGY; 7	SBO; 1	BRI; 19		RCH; 4	**NWS**; 2		HCY; 4									3rd	4070	
1985	Mike Day	6	Olds	DAY; 24	CAR; 5				DAR; 4					SBO; 11			IRP; 2	SBO; 4					DAR; 24				CLT; 14		CAR; 2										4th	3936	
1985	Mike Day	6	Chevy			HCY; 5	BRI; 4	MAR; 4*		**SBO**; 3*	LGY; 10				**HCY**; 8	ROU; 9																							4th	3936	
1985	Mike Day	6	Buick									DOV; 5	CLT; 23						LGY; 5	HCY; 4	MLW; 5*	BRI; 18		RCH; 7	**NWS**; 4	**ROU**; 4		HCY; 1		MAR; 4									4th	3936	
1986	Steve Arndt	6	Buick	DAY; 27	CAR; 3	HCY; 5	MAR; 15	BRI; 4	DAR; 7	SBO; 23	LGY; 1*	JFC; 25	DOV; 23	CLT; 28	SBO; 2	**HCY**; 1*	**ROU**; 1*	IRP; 24	SBO; 7	RAL; 23		SBO; 18	HCY; 26	**LGY**; 5	ROU; 14	BRI; 24	DAR; 9	RCH; 3	DOV; 2	**MAR**; 1*		CLT; 10	CAR; 10	MAR; 22					5th	4098	
1986	Steve Arndt	6	Pontiac																		OXF; 8										ROU; 5								5th	4098	
1987	Steve Arndt	6	Buick	**DAY**; 36	HCY; 3	MAR; 7	DAR; 37	BRI; 9	LGY; 2	SBO; 23	CLT; 6	DOV; 15	IRP; 20	ROU; 16	JFC; 21	OXF; 20	SBO; 3	**HCY**; 10	RAL; 31	LGY; 4	ROU; 26	BRI; 8	JFC; 14	DAR; 5	RCH; 4*	DOV; 5	MAR; 27	CLT; 31	CAR; 20	MAR; 23									12th	3205	
1988	Steve Arndt	6	Buick	DAY; 11	HCY; 2	CAR; 36	MAR; 11	DAR; 16	BRI; 7	LNG; 4	NZH; 19	SBO; 5	NSV; 7	CLT; 25	DOV; 20	**ROU**; 1*	LAN; 1*	LVL; 17	MYB; 3	OXF; 38	SBO; 3	HCY; 1	LNG; 4	IRP; 2	ROU; 6	BRI; 8	DAR; 11	RCH; 33	DOV; 37	MAR; 9	CLT; 11	CAR; 5	**MAR**; 9*						5th	3964	
1989	Steve Arndt	6	Buick	DAY; 11	CAR; 5	MAR; 2	HCY; 21	DAR; 15	BRI; 10	**NZH**; 19*	SBO; 3	LAN; 3*	NSV; 16	CLT; 7	DOV; 32	ROU; 2	LVL; 1	VOL; 12	MYB; 23	SBO; 1	HCY; 5	DUB; 7	IRP; 3	ROU; 2	BRI; 10	DAR; 17	RCH; 7	DOV; 13	MAR; 1	CLT; 39	CAR; 5	MAR; 24							2nd	3946	
1990	Houston Racing	6	Buick	DAY; 38	RCH; 12	CAR; 21	MAR; 1	HCY; 1*	DAR; 7	BRI; 27	LAN; 12	SBO; 6	NZH; 9	HCY; 2	CLT; 34	DOV; 6	ROU; 18	VOL; 1*	MYB; 27	OXF; 2	NHA; 26	SBO; 1	DUB; 4	IRP; 34	ROU; 13	BRI; 5	DAR; 37	RCH; 34	DOV; 11	MAR; 32	CLT; 6	NHA; 45	CAR; 40	MAR; 2					9th	3667	
1991	Houston Racing	6	Buick	DAY; 16	RCH; 13	CAR; 12	MAR; 8	VOL; 2	HCY; 16	DAR; 36	BRI; 21	LAN; 6	SBO; 11	NZH; 8	CLT; 7	DOV; 30	ROU; 7	HCY; 23	MYB; 19	GLN; 11	OXF; 2	NHA; 13	SBO; 3	DUB; 5	IRP; 5	ROU; 16	BRI; 14	DAR; 26	RCH; 19	DOV; 10	CLT; 21	NHA; 17	CAR; 25	MAR; 27					8th	3777	
1992	Houston Racing	6	Olds	DAY; 26			ATL; 19															TAL; 9			MCH; 16						CLT; 9								10th	3599	
1992	Houston Racing	6	Buick		CAR; 26	RCH; 35		MAR; 14	DAR; 10	BRI; 29	HCY; 1	LAN; 14	DUB; 25	NZH; 14	CLT; 19	DOV; 13	ROU; 13	MYB; 8	GLN; 18	VOL; 14	NHA; 10		IRP; 3	ROU; 28		NHA; 7	BRI; 20	DAR; 24	RCH; 24	DOV; 11		MAR; 10	CAR; 21	HCY; 10					10th	3599	
1993	Houston Racing	6	Ford	DAY; 40	CAR; 34	RCH; 15	DAR; 26	BRI; 18	HCY; 4	ROU; 23	MAR; 28		CLT; 39	DOV; 21	MYB; 14		MLW; 30	TAL; 13	IRP; 10	MCH; 23		BRI; 8	DAR; 31	RCH; DNQ	DOV; 27	ROU; 29	CLT; 13	MAR; 31	CAR; 31	HCY; 3	ATL; 17								16th	2852	
1993	Houston Racing	0	Ford									NZH; 27																											16th	2852	
1993	Houston Racing	3	Ford													GLN; 20																							16th	2852	
1993	Houston Racing	61	Ford																		NHA; 5																		16th	2852	
1993	Precision Products Racing	0	Olds																					RCH; 4															16th	2852	
1994	Houston Racing	6	Ford	DAY; 33	CAR; 35	RCH; DNQ	ATL		DAR; 42	HCY; 5	BRI; 2	ROU; 25	NHA	NZH; 13	CLT; DNQ	DOV	MYB; 22	GLN	MLW	SBO; 29	TAL; 33	HCY; DNQ	IRP; 2	MCH	BRI; 25	DAR; 30	RCH; 39	DOV; 35	CLT; DNQ	MAR; 9	CAR; 42								28th	1658	
1994	Rexrode Galiano Motorsports	1	Ford					MAR; 16																															28th	1658	
1995	Houston Racing	6	Ford	DAY; 35	CAR; 28	RCH; 7	ATL; DNQ	NSV; 22	DAR; 18	BRI; 26	HCY; DNQ	NHA; 42	NZH; 11	CLT; 21	DOV; 38	MYB; 12	GLN; 30	MLW; 13	TAL; 16	SBO; 14	IRP; 5	MCH; 36	BRI; 7	DAR; 37	RCH; DNQ	DOV; 34	CLT; 30	CAR; 41	HOM; 42										21st	2069	
1996	Houston Racing	6	Ford	DAY; DNQ	CAR; DNQ	RCH; DNQ	ATL; 35	NSV; 31	DAR; DNQ	BRI; 33	HCY; DNQ	NZH; 6	CLT; DNQ	DOV; 37	SBO; 27	MYB; 11	GLN; 22	MLW; 8	NHA; 16	TAL; DNQ	IRP; 30	MCH; 31	BRI; DNQ	DAR; 10	RCH; 39	DOV; 33	CLT; 21	CAR; 39	HOM; DNQ										28th	1563	
1996	Houston Racing	0	Ford								HCY; 31																												28th	1563	

==== Craftsman Truck Series ====
NASCAR Craftsman Truck Series results
Year	Team	No.	Make	1	2	3	4	5	6	7	8	9	10	11	12	13	14	15	16	17	18	19	20	21	22	23	24	25	NCTC	Pts	Ref
1999	Addington Racing	6	Chevy	HOM	PHO	EVG	MMR	MAR	MEM	PPR	I70	BRI	TEX	PIR	GLN	MLW	NSV	NZH	MCH	NHA	IRP	GTY	HPT	RCH	LVS; 35	LVL	TEX	CAL	117th	58	

==== Busch North Series ====
NASCAR Busch North Series results
Year	Team	No.	Make	1	2	3	4	5	6	7	8	9	10	11	12	13	14	15	16	17	18	19	20	21	22	23	NBNSC	Pts	Ref
1987	Steve Arndt	6	Buick	DAR	OXF	SEE	OXF	DOV	IRP	CNB	JEN	OXF	EPP	OXF	STA; 1*	HOL	TIO	OXF	UNI	DAR	SPE	DOV	SEE	CLT	OXF	CAR	59th	185	
1989	Steve Arndt	6	Buick	DAY	CAR	MAR	OXF	NZH	MND	OXF	DOV	OXF	JEN	EPP	HOL	OXF; 4	JEN	OXF	IRP	TMP	OXF	RPS	OXF	RCH	DOV	EPP	48th	160	
1992	Houston Racing	6	Buick	DAY	CAR	RCH	NHA	NZH	MND	OXF	DOV	LEE	JEN	OXF; 44	NHA	OXF	HOL	EPP	NHA	RPS	OXF	NHA	EPP				81st	31	

=== ARCA Talladega SuperCar Series ===
(key) (Bold – Pole position awarded by qualifying time. Italics – Pole position earned by points standings or practice time. * – Most laps led.)

ARCA Talladega SuperCar Series results
Year	Team	No.	Make	1	2	3	4	5	6	7	8	9	10	11	12	13	14	ATSC	Pts	Ref
1985	Mike Day	6	Olds	ATL	DAY	ATL	TAL	ATL	SSP	IRP; 2	CSP	FRS	IRP	OEF	ISF	DSF	TOL	95th	-	
