= 1982 NASCAR Budweiser Late Model Sportsman Series =

American motorsport season

Seasons
- ← none 1983 →

The inaugural NASCAR Budweiser Late Model Sportsman Series began on Saturday, February 13 and ended on Saturday, October 31. Jack Ingram, driving as an owner-driver, won the championship at season's end.

== Teams and drivers ==
Manufacturer	Team	No.	Race Driver	Rounds
Buick	Venturini Motorsports	35	Bill Venturini	1
Chevrolet	James Hauser	22	Steve Hauser	1
Dodge	Chubby Arrington	29	Joe Thurman	2
Dodge	Chubby Arrington	29	Satch Worley	2
Ford	Thackston Racing	24	Dale Jarrett	20
Ford	Thackston Racing	24	Glenn Jarrett	4
Pontiac	Butch Mock Motorsports	75	Gary Balough	1
Pontiac	Butch Mock Motorsports	75	Joe Ruttman	3
Pontiac	Charlie Henderson	15	Brad Teague	1
Pontiac	Gant Racing	33	George Dalton	10
Pontiac	Gant Racing	77	Harry Gant	5
Pontiac	Ingram Racing	11	Jack Ingram	All
Pontiac	Johnny Hayes Racing	28	Phil Parsons	All
Pontiac	HPV Motorsports	2	Jeff Hensley	10
Pontiac	HPV Motorsports	63	Jimmy Hensley	11
Pontiac	Kerry Bodenhamer	36	Kyle Petty	2
Pontiac	Lawson Racing	16	Jimmy Lawson	18
Pontiac	Marilyn Smith	12	Tommy Ellis	27
Pontiac	Mike Porter	3	Mike Porter	13
Pontiac	Rick Hanley	04	Rick Hanley	1
Pontiac	Rogers Racing	22	David Rogers	2
Pontiac	TGR Enterprises	8	Mike Riley	3
Pontiac	TGR Enterprises	32	Mike Riley	1
Pontiac	White Racing	1	Pete Silva	15
Pontiac	Zervakis Racing	01	Butch Lindley	14
Chevrolet Pontiac	Mike Day	6	Tommy Houston	7
Chevrolet Pontiac	Mike Day	7	Tommy Houston	1
Chevrolet Pontiac	Mike Day	27	Tommy Houston	21
Chevrolet Pontiac	Plessinger Racing	01	Geoff Bodine	1
Chevrolet Pontiac	Plessinger Racing	1	Geoff Bodine	1
Chevrolet Pontiac	Plessinger Racing	99	Geoff Bodine	7
Chevrolet Pontiac	Plessinger Racing	88	Bobby Allison	1
Ford Pontiac	Isenhower Racing	32	Dale Jarrett	7
Ford Pontiac	Weast Racing	42	Allan Powell	9
Ford Pontiac	Weast Racing	82	Ralph Morris	1
Oldsmobile Chevrolet	Thomas Brothers Racing	00	Sam Ard	All
Oldsmobile Pontiac	Robert Gee	15	Dale Earnhardt	8
Oldsmobile Pontiac	Robert Gee	45	Dale Earnhardt	1
Oldsmobile Pontiac	Whitaker Racing	7	Morgan Shepherd	9
Oldsmobile Pontiac	Whitaker Racing	15	Mark Martin	1
Oldsmobile Pontiac	Whitaker Racing	15	Dale Earnhardt	1
Oldsmobile Pontiac	Whitaker Racing	98	Morgan Shepherd	3
Pontiac Plymouth	A. G. Dillard Motorsports	22	Rick Mast	12

== Schedule ==
Schedule as follows:

No.	Race title	Track	Date
1	Goody's 300	Daytona International Speedway, Daytona Beach	February 13
2	Eastern 150	Richmond Fairgrounds Raceway, Richmond	February 20
3	Southeastern 150	Bristol International Speedway, Bristol	March 13
4	Dogwood 500	Martinsville Speedway, Martinsville	March 28
5	TranSouth 200	Darlington Raceway, Darlington	April 3
6	Mountain Dew 300	Hickory Speedway, Hickory	April 10
7	Busch 200	South Boston Speedway, South Boston	April 18
8	Budweiser 200	Caraway Speedway, Asheboro	April 23
9	Spring 220	Richmond Fairgrounds Raceway, Richmond	May 2
10	Hampton Chevy 200	Langley Speedway, Hampton	May 8
11	Sportsman 200	Dover Downs International Speedway, Dover	May 15
12	Sunkist 200	Hickory Speedway, Hickory	May 23
13	Mello Yello 300	Charlotte Motor Speedway, Concord	May 29
14	Inaugural 200	Asheville Speedway, Asheville	June 11
15	Winston 200	Hickory Speedway, Hickory	June 19
16	Roses Stores 200	South Boston Speedway, South Boston	June 26
17	Coca-Cola 200	North Carolina Motor Speedway, Rockingham	June 27
18	Goody's 200	Caraway Speedway, Asheboro	July 7
19	Lowes 200	South Boston Speedway, South Boston	July 24
20	Goody's 200	Hickory Speedway, Hickory	August 1
21	Gene Lovelace 200	Langley Speedway, Hampton	August 7
22	Kroger 200	Indianapolis Raceway Park, Clermont	August 13
23	Pet Dairy 150	Bristol International Speedway, Bristol	August 27
24	Bobby Isaac Memorial 200	Hickory Speedway, Hickory	September 4
25	Harvest 150	Richmond Fairgrounds Raceway, Richmond	September 11
26	Autumn 150	Martinsville Speedway, Martinsville	September 25
27	Miller Time 300	Charlotte Motor Speedway, Concord	October 9
28	Southern Auto Racing News 200	Hickory Speedway, Hickory	October 17
29	Cardinal 250	Martinsville Speedway, Martinsville	October 31

== Races ==
=== Goody's 300 ===
The Goody's 300, which had been a Sportsman race, was moved to the national tour, and was run on February 13 at Daytona International Speedway in Daytona Beach, Florida. Mike Porter won the pole.

Top ten results

1. #15 - Dale Earnhardt
2. #98 - Jody Ridley
3. #00 - Sam Ard
4. #75 - Gary Balough
5. #99 - Geoff Bodine
6. #77 - Harry Gant
7. #3 - Mike Porter
8. #28 - Phil Parsons
9. #27 - Tommy Houston
10. #24 - Dale Jarrett

=== Eastern 150 ===
The Eastern 150 was run on February 20 at Richmond Fairgrounds Raceway in Richmond, Virginia. Geoff Bodine won the pole.

Top ten results

1. #6 - Tommy Houston
2. - Bubba Nissen
3. #22 - Rick Mast
4. #27 - Bosco Lowe
5. #3 - Mike Porter
6. #24 - Dale Jarrett
7. - Dickie Boswell
8. - Ray Hendrick
9. #28 - Phil Parsons
10. - Orvil Reedy

=== Southeastern 150 ===
The Southeastern 150 was run on March 13 at Bristol International Speedway in Bristol, Tennessee. David Pearson won the pole.

Top ten results

1. #28 - Phil Parsons
2. #21 - David Pearson
3. #36 - Tommy Ellis
4. #11 - Jack Ingram
5. #15 - Brad Teague
6. #23 - Larry Utsman
7. #12 - Ronnie Silver
8. #2 - Tommy Hilbert
9. #35 - Buck Doran
10. #27 - Willie Blevins

=== Dogwood 500 ===
The Dogwood 500 was run on March 28 at Martinsville Speedway in Martinsville, Virginia. Geoff Bodine won the pole.

Top ten results

1. #00 - Sam Ard
2. #01 - Butch Lindley
3. #11 - Jack Ingram
4. #99 - Geoff Bodine
5. #29 - Joe Thurman
6. #2 - Jeff Hensley
7. #63 - Jimmy Hensley
8. #06 - Dickie Boswell
9. #27 - Tommy Houston
10. #1 - Pete Silva

=== TranSouth 200 ===
The TranSouth 200 was run on April 3 at Darlington Raceway in Darlington, South Carolina. Harry Gant won the pole.

Top ten results

1. #99 - Geoff Bodine
2. #98 - Jody Ridley
3. #21 - David Pearson
4. #11 - Jack Ingram
5. #3 - Mike Porter
6. #00 - Sam Ard
7. #24 - Glenn Jarrett
8. #50 - John Anderson
9. #27 - Tommy Houston
10. #82 - Allan Powell

=== Mountain Dew 300 ===
The Mountain Dew 300 was run on April 10 at Hickory Speedway in Hickory, North Carolina. Sam Ard won the pole.

Top ten results

1. #11 - Jack Ingram
2. #00 - Sam Ard
3. #28 - Phil Parsons
4. #27 - Tommy Houston
5. #99 - Geoff Bodine
6. - Gary Neice
7. #14 - Ronnie Silver
8. #24 - Dale Jarrett
9. - Ben Hess
10. - Allan Powell

=== Busch 200 ===
The Busch 200 was run on April 18 at South Boston Speedway in South Boston, Virginia. Jack Ingram won the pole.

Top ten results

1. #00 - Sam Ard
2. #11 - Jack Ingram
3. - Jimmy Hensley
4. - Ray Hendrick
5. - Bob Shreeves
6. #27 - Tommy Houston
7. - Bubba Nissen
8. - Wayne Patterson
9. - Dickie Boswell
10. - Gary Neice

=== Budweiser 200 ===
The Budweiser 200 was run on April 23 at Caraway Speedway in Asheboro, North Carolina. Sam Ard won the pole.

Top ten results

1. #15 - Dale Earnhardt
2. - Jimmy Hensley
3. #00 - Sam Ard
4. #27 - Tommy Houston
5. - Bob Shreeves
6. - Jeff Hensley
7. #24 - Dale Jarrett
8. - Darrell Wheeler
9. - Don Browning
10. - Butch Isom

=== Spring 220 ===
The Spring 220 was run on May 2 at Richmond Fairgrounds Raceway in Richmond, Virginia. Sam Ard won the pole.

Top ten results

1. #01 - Butch Lindley
2. #00 - Sam Ard
3. #12 - Tommy Ellis
4. #11 - Jack Ingram
5. - Ray Hendrick
6. #28 - Phil Parsons
7. - Jimmy Lawson
8. - Wayne Patterson
9. - Bubba Nissen
10. - Frank Butler

=== Hampton Chevy 200 ===
The Hampton Chevy 200 was run on May 8 at Langley Speedway in Hampton, Virginia. Bob Shreeves won the pole.

Top ten results

1. #11 - Jack Ingram
2. #00 - Sam Ard
3. #28 - Phil Parsons
4. - Ray Hendrick
5. #1 - Pete Silva
6. - Bob Shreeves
7. - Jimmy Lawson
8. - Diane Teel
9. - Jeff Hensley
10. - Lester Gupton

=== Sportsman 200 ===
The Sportsman 200 was run on May 15 at Dover Downs International Speedway in Dover, DE. Harry Gant won the pole.

Top ten results

1. #75 - Joe Ruttman
2. #11 - Jack Ingram
3. #01 - Butch Lindley
4. #12 - Tommy Ellis
5. #21 - David Pearson
6. #6 - Tommy Houston
7. #28 - Phil Parsons
8. #99 - Geoff Bodine
9. #25 - Bobby Allison
10. #33 - George Dalton

=== Sunkist 200 ===
The Sunkist 200 was run on May 23 at Hickory Speedway in Hickory, North Carolina. Morgan Shepherd won the pole.

Top ten results

1. #7 - Morgan Shepherd
2. #00 - Sam Ard
3. #11 - Jack Ingram
4. #39 - John Settlemyre
5. #27 - Tommy Houston
6. #14 - Ronnie Silver
7. #9 - Bob Shreeves
8. #01 - Gary Neice
9. #24 - Dale Jarrett
10. #12 - Tommy Ellis

=== Mello Yello 300 ===
The Mello Yello 300 was run on May 29 at Charlotte Motor Speedway in Concord, North Carolina. Harry Gant won the pole.

Top ten results

1. #77 - Harry Gant
2. #15 - Dale Earnhardt
3. #7 - Morgan Shepherd
4. #12 - Tommy Ellis
5. #25 - Bobby Allison
6. #47 - Darrell Waltrip
7. #3 - Mike Porter
8. #99 - Geoff Bodine
9. #22 - David Rogers
10. #24 - Glenn Jarrett

=== Inaugural 200 ===
The Inaugural 200 was run on June 11 at New Asheville Speedway in Asheville, North Carolina. Gary Neice won the pole.

Top ten results

1. #11 - Jack Ingram
2. #12 - Tommy Ellis
3. #00 - Sam Ard
4. #14 - Ronnie Silver
5. #7 - Morgan Shepherd
6. #20 - Bosco Lowe
7. #28 - Phil Parsons
8. - Ronnie Davidson
9. #88 - Richie Rice
10. #24 - Dale Jarrett

=== Winston 200 ===
The Winston 200 was run on June 19 at Hickory Speedway in Hickory, North Carolina. Tommy Ellis won the pole.

Top ten results

1. #39 - John Settlemyre
2. #12 - Tommy Ellis
3. #00 - Sam Ard
4. #11 - Jack Ingram
5. #14 - Ronnie Silver
6. #24 - Dale Jarrett
7. #27 - Tommy Houston
8. #1 - Pete Silva
9. #28 - Phil Parsons
10. - Ronnie Davidson

=== Roses Stores 200 ===
The Roses Stores 200 was run on June 26 at South Boston Speedway in South Boston, VA. Butch Lindley won the pole.

Top ten results

1. #01 - Butch Lindley
2. #00 - Sam Ard
3. #28 - Phil Parsons
4. #11 - Jack Ingram
5. #22 - Rick Mast
6. - Bob Shreeves
7. #24 - Dale Jarrett
8. - Dickie Boswell
9. - Carol Harris
10. - Bob Glass

=== Coca-Cola 200 ===
The Coca-Cola 200 was run on June 27 at North Carolina Motor Speedway in Rockingham, NC. This race was originally scheduled for March, but was snowed out. David Pearson won the pole.

Top ten results

1. #21 - David Pearson
2. #15 - Dale Earnhardt
3. #28 - Phil Parsons
4. #11 - Jack Ingram
5. #00 - Sam Ard
6. #1 - Pete Silva
7. - Satch Worley
8. #24 - Dale Jarrett
9. - Harry Lee Hill
10. #87 - Steve Jarvis

=== Goody's 200 ===
The Goody's 200 was run on July 7 at Caraway Speedway in Asheville, North Carolina. Sam Ard won the pole.

Top ten results

1. #11 - Jack Ingram
2. #00 - Sam Ard
3. #7 - Morgan Shepherd
4. - Jimmy Hensley
5. #1 - Pete Silva
6. #24 - Dale Jarrett
7. #27 - Tommy Ellis
8. - John Utsman
9. - Jeff Hensley
10. - Jimmy Lawson

=== Lowes 200 ===
The Lowes 200 was run on July 24 at South Boston Speedway in South Boston, VA. Butch Lindley won the pole.

Top ten results

1. #00 - Sam Ard
2. #11 - Jack Ingram
3. #12 - Tommy Ellis
4. #01 - Butch Lindley
5. #27 - Tommy Houston
6. - Bubba Nissen
7. - Jimmy Hensley
8. - Carol Harris
9. #24 - Dale Jarrett
10. - Charlie Luck

=== Goody's 200 ===
The Goody's 200 was run on August 1 at Hickory Speedway in Hickory, North Carolina. Tommy Ellis won the pole.

Top ten results

1. #27 - Tommy Houston
2. #12 - Tommy Ellis
3. #11 - Jack Ingram
4. #1 - Pete Silva
5. #00 - Sam Ard
6. - Allan Powell
7. - Gary Neice
8. #28 - Phil Parsons
9. - Ronnie Davidson
10. - Bennie Davis

=== Gene Lovelace 200 ===
The Gene Lovelace 200 was run on August 7 at Langley Speedway in Hampton, VA. Tommy Ellis won the pole.

Top ten results

1. #12- Tommy Ellis
2. #11- Jack Ingram
3. #00- Sam Ard
4. #27- Tommy Houston
5. #1- Pete Silva
6. #28- Phil Parsons
7. - Carol Harris
8. - Charlie Luck
9. #24- Dale Jarrett
10. - Jimmy Lawson

=== Kroger 200 ===
The Kroger 200 was run on August 13 at Indianapolis Raceway Park in Clermont, IN. Sam Ard won the pole.

Top ten results

1. #98 - Morgan Shepherd
2. #12 - Tommy Ellis
3. #6 - Tommy Houston
4. #63 - Jimmy Hensley
5. #11 - Jack Ingram
6. #01 - Butch Lindley
7. #22 - Rick Mast
8. #47 - Randy Tissot
9. #25 - Bobby Allison
10. #18 - Jeff Berry

=== Pet Dairy 150 ===
The Pet Dairy 150 was run on August 27 at Bristol International Speedway in Bristol, Tennessee. Morgan Shepherd won the pole.

Top ten results

1. #11 - Jack Ingram
2. #01 - Butch Lindley
3. #98 - Morgan Shepherd
4. #36 - Tommy Ellis
5. #27 - Bosco Lowe
6. #47 - Randy Tissot
7. #24 - Glenn Jarrett
8. #21 - Larry Pearson
9. #00 - Sam Ard
10. #6 - Tommy Houston

=== Bobby Isaac Memorial 200 ===
The Bobby Isaac Memorial 200 was run on September 4 at Hickory Speedway in Hickory, North Carolina. Sam Ard won the pole.

Top ten results

1. #11 - Jack Ingram
2. #00 - Sam Ard
3. #27 - Tommy Houston
4. #7 - Morgan Shepherd
5. - Gary Neice
6. #39 - John Settlemyre
7. #12 - Tommy Ellis
8. #24 - Dale Jarrett
9. #28 - Phil Parsons
10. #14 - Ronnie Silver

=== Harvest 150 ===
The Harvest 150 was run on September 11 at Richmond Fairgrounds Raceway in Richmond, VA. Tommy Ellis won the pole.

Top ten results

1. #01 - Butch Lindley
2. #7 - Morgan Shepherd
3. #00 - Sam Ard
4. #27 - Tommy Houston
5. - Bob Shreeves
6. #11 - Jack Ingram
7. - Charlie Luck
8. #22 - Rick Mast
9. - Bubba Nissen
10. - Jimmy Lawson

=== Autumn 150 ===
The Autumn 150 was run on September 25 at Martinsville Speedway in Martinsville, VA. Sam Ard won the pole.

Top ten results

1. #00 - Sam Ard
2. #01 - Butch Lindley
3. #6 - Tommy Houston
4. #12 - Tommy Ellis
5. #11 - Jack Ingram
6. #28 - Phil Parsons
7. #5 - Joe Thurman
8. #99 - Wayne Patterson
9. #4 - Carol Harris
10. #39 - John Settlemyre

=== Miller Time 300 ===
The Miller Time 300 was run on October 9 at Charlotte Motor Speedway in Concord, NC. Phil Parsons won the pole.

Top ten results

1. #17- Darrell Waltrip
2. #00- Sam Ard
3. #88- Bobby Allison
4. #24- Glenn Jarrett
5. #11- Jack Ingram
6. #5- John Anderson
7. #28- Phil Parsons
8. #21- Larry Pearson
9. #4- Rodney Combs
10. #24- Bosco Lowe

=== Southern Auto Racing News 200 ===
The Southern Auto Racing News 200 was run on October 17 at Hickory Speedway in Hickory, NC. Phil Parsons won the pole.

Top ten results

1. #11- Jack Ingram
2. #12- Tommy Ellis
3. #24- Dale Jarrett
4. #1- Pete Silva
5. - Bob Shreeves
6. - Billy Hess
7. - Wayne Patterson
8. - Allan Powell
9. #28- Phil Parsons
10. - Jimmy Hensley

=== Cardinal 250 ===
The Cardinal 250 was run on October 31 at Martinsville Speedway in Martinsville, VA. Tommy Ellis won the pole.

Top ten results

1. #01 - Butch Lindley
2. #45 - Charlie Luck
3. #9 - Bob Shreeves
4. #3 - Mike Porter
5. #15 - Bob Pressley
6. #00 - Sam Ard
7. #28 - Phil Parsons
8. #2 - Jeff Hensley
9. #18 - Ronnie Silver
10. #39 - Paul Radford

The above information is from Racing Reference.

== Final Points Standings ==
1. Jack Ingram - 4495
2. Sam Ard - 4448
3. Tommy Ellis - 3873
4. Tommy Houston - 3827
5. Phil Parsons - 3783
6. Dale Jarrett - 3415
7. Pete Silva - 2349
8. Jimmy Lawson - 2105
9. Butch Lindley - 2063
10. Bob Shreeves - 1928

== See also ==
- 1982 NASCAR Winston Cup Series
- 1982 NASCAR Winston West Series
