= Coca-Cola 300 =

There have been two NASCAR Busch Series (now Xfinity Series) races named Coca-Cola 300:

- Coca-Cola 300 (North Wilkesboro), held at North Wilkesboro Speedway in 1984 and 1985
- Coca-Cola 300 (Texas), held at Texas Motor Speedway from 1997 to 1999
