= Ray Hendrick =

American racing driver (1929–1990)

Raymond Hendrick
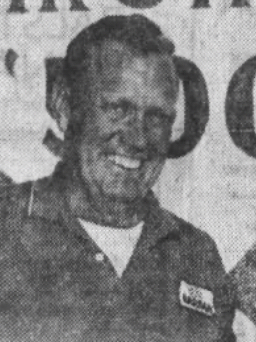
- Hendrick in 1968
- Born: April 1, 1929; Richmond, Virginia, U.S.
- Died: September 28, 1990 (aged 61)
- Cause of death: Cancer
- Achievements: All-time wins leader at Martinsville Speedway (20 wins)
- Awards: Named one of NASCAR's 50 Greatest Drivers (1998); National Motorsports Press Association Hall of Fame (1993); Virginia Motorsports Hall of Fame (2003); International Motorsports Hall of Fame (2007); Ranked No. 4 on All-Time Top 10 Modified Drivers list (2010); Named one of NASCAR's 75 Greatest Drivers (2023); NASCAR Hall of Fame (2026)

NASCAR Cup Series career
- 17 races run over 10 years
- Best finish: 75th (1969)
- First race: 1967 Southern 500 (Darlington)
- Last race: 1974 Old Dominion 500 (Martinsville)
Wins	Top tens	Poles
0	6	0

NASCAR O'Reilly Auto Parts Series career
- 7 races run over 1 year
- Best finish: 27th (1982)
- First race: 1982 Eastern 150 (Richmond)
- Last race: 1982 Harvest 150 Richmond)
Wins	Top tens	Poles
0	4	0
- Statistics up to date as of April 24, 2013.

Ray Hendrick (April 1, 1929 – September 28, 1990) was an American race car driver. He was known as "Mr. Modified" during his 36-year career in motorsports, mainly in the modified stock car racing class.

The Virginia native collected more than 700 victories in modifieds and the NASCAR Late Model Sportsman Series (later known as Busch Grand National Division). Ray Hendrick was inducted into the Virginia Sports Hall of Fame in 2012, the International Motorsports Hall of Fame in 2007, and will be inducted in the NASCAR Hall of Fame in 2026.

Hendrick raced his famous winged No. 11 Modified coupe fielded by Jack Tant and Clayton Mitchell. Rick Hendrick (no relation) was a pit crew member on his car in the 1960s. The Richmond, Virginia star won five track championships at South Boston Speedway, four of them while competing in the NASCAR Modified division and one in the NASCAR Late Model Sportsman division.

Hendrick never won the National Modified Championship but finished in the top-ten in points nine times:

- 7th in 1960,
- 9th in 1961,
- 6th in 1963,
- 3rd in 1964,
- 7th in 1965,
- 3rd in 1966,
- 5th in 1967,
- 6th in 1968, and
- 10th in 1969.

Hendrick also finished eighth in 1974 and ninth in 1975 in the National Late Model Sportsman Points before it became known as the Busch Grand National Division. Ray won the Modified "Race of Champions" 2 times, in 1969 on the 1-mile Langhorne Speedway asphalt and in 1975 on the Trenton Speedway 1.5-mile oval. Hendrick is first on the all-time winners list of Martinsville Speedway with 20 wins between 1963 and 1975. Next on the list is Richard Petty with 15 wins, followed by Geoff Bodine, Darrell Waltrip, and Richie Evans. Hendrick also won a 100 Lap National Championship race on Memorial Day Weekend of 1970 at Stafford Motor Speedway.

Hendrick was best known for his racing philosophy of racing anywhere and everywhere. Hendrick's modified career and philosophy of racing anywhere and everywhere prevented him from competing full-time in NASCAR Winston Cup. In 17 starts, he collected two top-five and six top-ten finishes.

== Racing record ==
(Note: NASCAR didn't keep an official record on statistics for the Budweiser Late Model Sportsman Series until 1982 or the Whelen Modified Tour until 1985)

Season	Series	Team Name	No.	Races	Poles	Wins	Points	Final Placing
1953	National Modified Series	–	154	1+	-	-	3,461	14th
1954	Sportsman Division	–	-	-	-	-	222	798th
1954	National Modified Series	–	-	-	-	-	3,004	8th
1956	Grand National Series	Sam McCuthen	25/44	2	0	0	0	228th
1957	NASCAR Convertible Division	J.S. Rice	90	3	0	0	536	46th
1959	Sportsman Division	–	-	1	-	-	-	-
1960	National Modified Series	–	-	-	-	-	2,572	7th
1961	National Modified Series	–	-	-	-	-	3,064	9th
1962	Grand National Series	Rebel Racing	35	2	0	0	0	83rd
1962	National Modified Series	–	2	1+	-	-	3,036	6th
1963	Grand National Series	Rebel Racing	35	2	0	0	716	87th
1963	National Modified Series	–	-	2+	-	1+	3,036	6th
1964	National Modified Series	–	11	3+	-	-	4,675	3rd
1965	National Modified Series	–	-	-	-	-	2,958	7th
1966	National Modified Series	–	11	3+	-	1+	5,872	3rd
1967	Grand National Series	Cotton Owens	5	1	0	0	0	112th
1967	National Modified Series	Jack Tant	11/90	2+	-	-	4,210	5th
1968	Grand National Series	Tom Friedkin	14/15	4	0	0	0	95th
1968	National Modified Series	–	-	-	-	-	4,054	6th
1969	Grand National Series	Ray Hendrick	20	1	0	0	76	75th
1969	Late Model Sportsman Division	-	11	1+	-	-	2,301	16th
1969	Grand Touring	–	-	1+	-	-	-	-
1970	National Modified Series	Jack Tant	-	-	1+	1+	2,979	11th
1970	Late Model Sportsman Division	Bob Adams	-	1+	1+	1+	2,301	16th
1970	Grand American	–	0	1+	-	-	-	-
1971	Winston Cup Series	L. G. DeWitt	42	1	0	0	0	-
1971	Late Model Sportsman Division	-	38	2+	-	2+	2,301	16th
1971	National Modified Series	-	1	1+	-	-	-	-
1972	Winston Cup Series	Dave Marcis	2	1	0	0	0	-
1972	Late Model Sportsman Division	-	38	1+	-	-	-	-
1973	Winston Cup Series	Junie Donlavey	90	2	0	0	0	88th
1974	Winston Cup Series	Nord Krauskopf	71	1	0	0	0.62	128th
1974	Late Model Sportsman Division	-	15	2+	-	-	4,262	8th
1974	National Modified Series	–	1	2+	-	-	-	-
1975	Late Model Sportsman Division	-	-	1+	-	1+	3,450	9th
1975	National Modified Series	–	01	1+	-	-	1,381	20th
1976	Budweiser Late Model Sportsman Series	Dick Armstrong	01	2+	-	-	-	-
1976	National Modified Series	–	01	1+	-	-	1,381	20th
1977	Budweiser Late Model Sportsman Series	-	01	7+	-	1+	2,085	14th
1977	National Modified Series	–	01	4+	-	-	725	31st
1978	Budweiser Late Model Sportsman Series	-	62/90	3+	-	-	1,637	14th
1978	National Modified Series	–	26	3+	-	1+	857	23rd
1979	Budweiser Late Model Sportsman Series	-	02	1+	-	-	2,007	10th
1980	Budweiser Late Model Sportsman Series	-	02	4+	-	1+	1,415	18th
1980	Grand American	–	-	1+	-	-	-	-
1981	Budweiser Late Model Sportsman Series	-	-	2+	-	-	-	-
1982	Budweiser Late Model Sportsman Series	-	-	7	0	0	965	27th
1983	Late Model Stock Car	-	-	1	0	0	-	-

== Awards ==
- Named one of NASCAR's 50 Greatest Drivers (1998)
- Ranked No. 4 on All-Time Top 10 Modified Drivers list (2010)
- First Inductee - Virginia Motorsports Hall of Fame 2003)
- Inductee - National Motorsports Press Association Hall of Fame (1993)
- Inductee - International Motorsports Hall of Fame (2007)
- Inductee - NASCAR Hall of Fame (2026)
