= 1982 Virginia National Bank 500 =

Auto race held at Martinsville Speedway in 1982

Race details
- Race 8 of 30 in the 1982 NASCAR Winston Cup Series season
- A map showing the layout of Martinsville Speedway
- Date: April 25, 1982
- Official name: Virginia National Bank 500
- Location: Martinsville Speedway, Martinsville, Virginia
- Course: Permanent racing facility
- Course length: 0.525 miles (0.844 km)
- Distance: 500 laps, 262.5 mi (442.4 km)
- Weather: 74.8 °F (23.8 °C); wind speeds of 12.8 miles per hour (20.6 km/h)
- Average speed: 75.073 miles per hour (120.818 km/h)
- Attendance: 36,500

Pole position
Driver	Terry Labonte	Hagan Enterprises

Most laps led
Driver	Harry Gant	Mach 1 Racing
- Laps: 167

Winner
No. 33	Harry Gant	Mach 1 Racing

Television in the United States
- Network: untelevised
- Announcers: none

The 1982 Virginia National Bank 500 was a NASCAR Winston Cup Series racing event that was set on April 25, 1982, at Martinsville Speedway in Martinsville, Virginia.

== Background ==
Martinsville Speedway is one of five short tracks to hold NASCAR races. The standard track at Martinsville Speedway is a four-turn short track oval that is 0.526 miles (0.847 km) long. The track's turns are banked at eleven degrees, while the front stretch, the location of the finish line, is banked at zero degrees. The back stretch also has a zero degree banking.

== Race report ==
A starting grid of 31 drivers competed for three and a half hours in this 500-lap race. D.K. Ulrich was involved in a crash on lap 14; leading to his last-place finish. An audience of 36,500 saw Harry Gant defeat Butch Lindley by a distance of slightly more than a lap.

The majority of the field was driving Buick vehicles. Terry Labonte and Ricky Rudd would dominate the first one hundred laps of this race while Harry Gant would monopolize the closing laps of this race with a 1-lap lead over everyone else. Joe Ruttman would be the lowest finishing driver to complete the race; albeit more than 50 laps behind the only driver on the lead lap, Gant. This would be his first victory ever in the NASCAR Cup Series.

The pole position was won by Terry Labonte with his a qualifying speed of 89.998 miles per hour (144.838 km/h); racing speeds for this event averaged 75.073 miles per hour (120.818 km/h). Brad Teague's 11th place finish in this race was also the highest finishing position in the Cup series for team owner, Charlie Henderson. Winnings for this event ranged from the winner's share of $26,795 ($87,306 when adjusted for inflation) to the last-place finisher's share of $1,300 ($4,236 when adjusted for inflation). The overall prize purse for this race was $170,500 ($555,536 when adjusted for inflation).

=== Qualifying ===
Grid	No.	Driver	Manufacturer	Owner
1	44	Terry Labonte	Chevrolet	Billy Hagan
2	28	Benny Parsons	Pontiac	Harry Ranier
3	33	Harry Gant	Buick	Hal Needham
4	3	Ricky Rudd	Pontiac	Richard Childress
5	50	Geoffrey Bodine	Pontiac	Cliff Stewart
6	98	Morgan Shepherd	Buick	Ron Benfield
7	88	Bobby Allison	Chevrolet	DiGard Racing
8	2	Tim Richmond	Buick	Jim Stacy
9	21	Neil Bonnett	Ford	Wood Brothers
10	02	Mark Martin	Pontiac	Bud Reeder
11	75	Joe Ruttman	Buick	RahMoc Enterprises
12	11	Darrell Waltrip	Buick	Junior Johnson
13	47	Ron Bouchard	Buick	Jack Beebe
14	01	Butch Lindley	Buick	Emanuel Zervakis
15	15	Dale Earnhardt	Ford	Bud Moore

== Top 10 finishers ==
Pos	Grid	No.	Driver	Manufacturer	Laps	Laps led	Points	Time/Status
1	3	33	Harry Gant	Buick	500	167	185	3:30:01
2	14	01	Butch Lindley	Buick	499	163	175	+1 lap and 1 second
3	9	21	Neil Bonnett	Ford	497	0	165	+3 laps
4	4	3	Ricky Rudd	Pontiac	496	55	165	+4 laps
5	12	11	Darrell Waltrip	Buick	496	25	160	+4 laps
6	16	71	Dave Marcis	Chevrolet	494	0	150	+4 laps
7	10	02	Mark Martin	Pontiac	492	0	146	+8 laps
8	24	67	Buddy Arrington	Dodge	489	0	142	+11 laps
9	21	40	Jimmy Hensley	Buick	485	0	138	+15 laps
10	28	48	Slick Johnson	Pontiac	484	0	134	+16 laps

== Standings after the race ==
Pos	Driver	Points	Differential
1	Terry Labonte	1235	0
2 ▲	Darrell Waltrip	1155	-80
3 ▼	Benny Parsons	1134	-101
4 ▲	Harry Gant	1122	-113
5 ▼	Bobby Allison	1069	-139
6	Dale Earnhardt	1039	-199
7 ▼	Morgan Shepherd	1029	-206
8	Richard Petty	1019	-216
9	Buddy Arrington	1015	-220
10 ▲	Dave Marcis	950	-285

Preceded by 1982 Northwest Bank 400	NASCAR Winston Cup Series Season; 1982	Succeeded by 1982 Winston 500
