= Teresa Earnhardt =

American stock car racing team owner

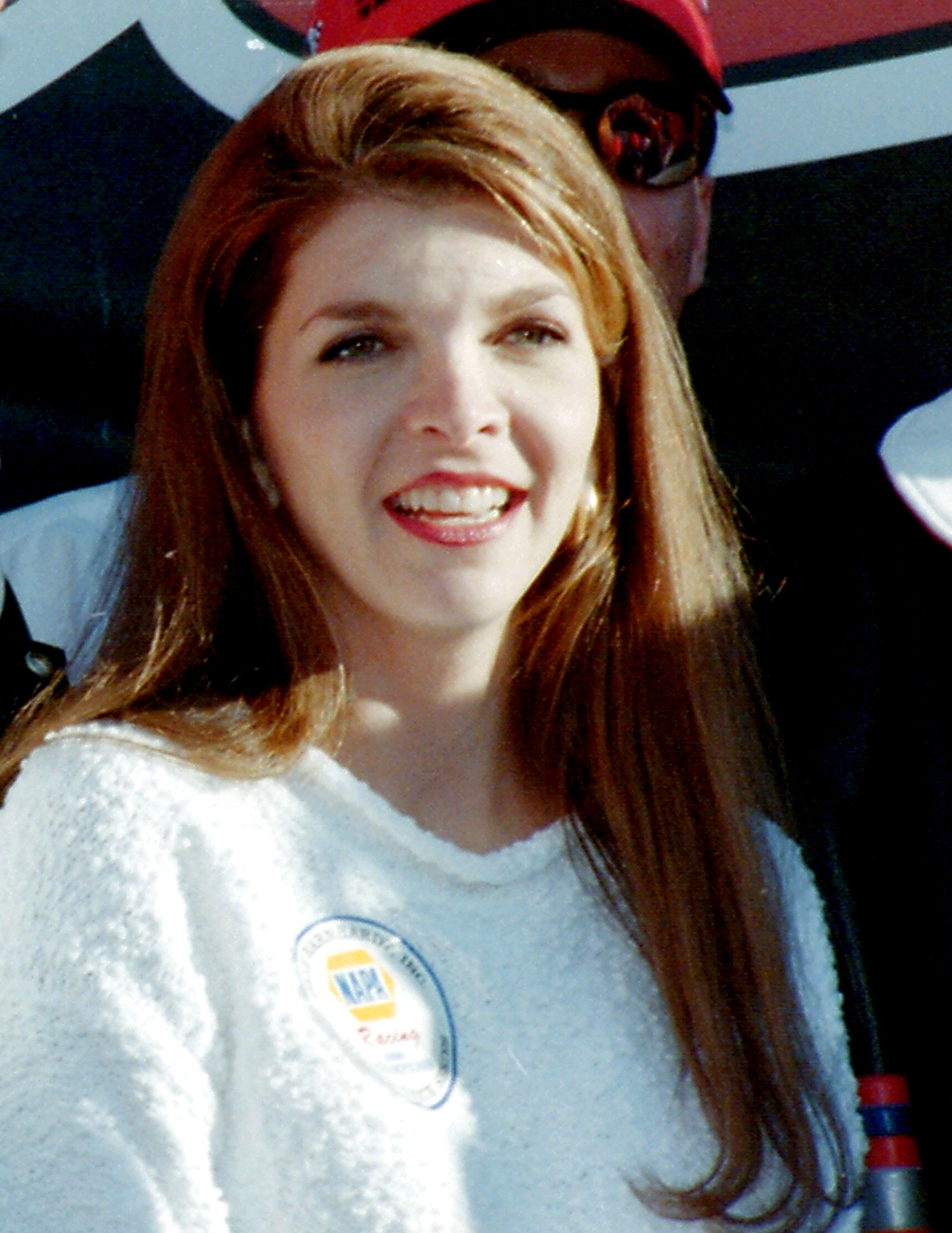
- Earnhardt in 1996
- Born: Teresa Diane Houston; October 29, 1958 (age 68); Hickory, North Carolina, U.S.
- Known for: NASCAR team owner
- Spouses: Dale Earnhardt (m. 1982; died 2001)
- Children: Taylor Earnhardt

Teresa Diane Earnhardt (née Houston; born October 29, 1958) is an American former NASCAR team owner. She is the third wife and widow of Dale Earnhardt. She is the biological mother of Taylor Nicole Earnhardt and the stepmother of Kerry Earnhardt, Kelley Earnhardt Miller and Dale Earnhardt Jr.

== Early life ==
Teresa Diane Houston was born in Hickory, North Carolina, the daughter of Hal Houston and the niece of Tommy Houston, legendary Busch Series driver. Her cousin Andy Houston raced in all three of NASCAR's top series. Teresa is a graduate of Bunker Hill High School in Claremont, North Carolina. She has a degree in commercial art and interior design. Teresa met Dale Earnhardt, NASCAR driver, at a race in the late 1970s. The two married November 14, 1982. It was Dale's third marriage. They lived on a 300-plus acre farm near Mooresville, North Carolina. Taylor Nicole Earnhardt was born to the couple on December 20, 1988.

== NASCAR career ==
=== Dale Earnhardt, Inc. ===
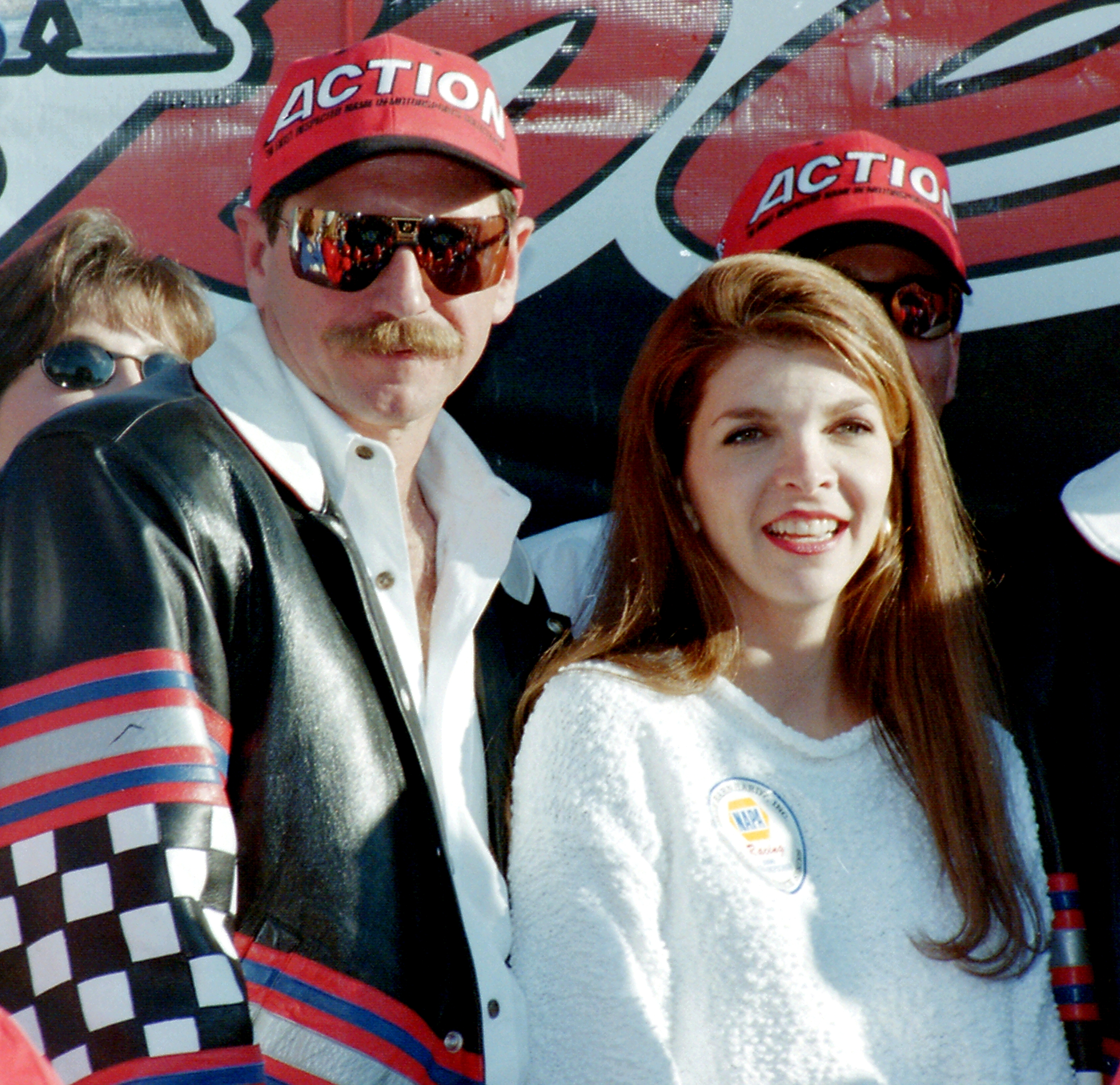
Dale and Teresa Earnhardt in 1996

Teresa headed Dale Earnhardt, Inc. (DEI) during two Busch Series championships in 1998 and 1999 and two Craftsman Truck Series championships in 1996 and 1998. Through Chance 2 Motorsports, she was also part owner of the Busch Series championship team in 2004 and 2005. Her first Daytona 500 win as a team owner occurred when driver of the No. 15 Chevrolet driven by Michael Waltrip won at the 2001 race. The win, however, was overshadowed by her husband's death in a crash during the final lap of the race.

Teresa's strained relationship with her stepson Dale Earnhardt Jr. ended in May 2007 when he announced he would not be returning to DEI for the 2008 season after an agreement could not be reached that suited himself and his three siblings who claimed equal rights to the business.

In late 2006, Teresa hired entertainment executive Max Siegel as President of Global Operations to help DEI expand into the entertainment industry. On July 25, 2007, DEI purchased Ginn Racing.

=== Earnhardt Ganassi Racing merger ===
Teresa was unable to retain the sponsorships of Budweiser and U.S. Army, who pulled support following the exit of Earnhardt Jr. This was a major factor leading to the merger with Chip Ganassi Racing with Felix Sabates in November 2008 that formed Earnhardt Ganassi Racing.

In 2010, the team won the Daytona 500 with Jamie McMurray.

In 2014, Teresa's ownership of the EGR team was absorbed by Ganassi, which reverted the name back to Chip Ganassi Racing. When Chip Ganassi was asked why the team released her, he replied "Teresa was a good partner but she was no longer there. So I just bought her share of the team and reverted the name."

Dale Earnhardt Inc. continues to operate in Mooresville, NC, as the parent company of the varied Earnhardt businesses, and Teresa works to make money off of her late husband's legacy through the work of the Dale Earnhardt Foundation.

== Trademark dispute ==
In May 2016, Teresa sued stepson Kerry Earnhardt for using the Earnhardt name in his business venture. Kerry and his wife René were planning to market a line of homes and furniture under the name "The Earnhardt Collection". On July 27, 2017, Teresa won an appeal, which required the U.S. Trademark Trial and Appeal Board to clarify its decision to allow Kerry to use the name "Earnhardt Collection" in his business. Kerry Earnhardt ultimately won the case and the right to use “Earnhardt” in his business venture, as a surname cannot be trademarked.
