= Bubba Nissen =

American NASCAR driver (born 1960)

- Born: February 5, 1960 (age 66); Virginia Beach, Virginia, U.S.

NASCAR O'Reilly Auto Parts Series career
- 26 races run over 4 years
- Best finish: 24th (1982)
- First race: 1982 Eastern 150 (Richmond)
- Last race: 1985 Roses Stores 200 (South Boston)
Wins	Top tens	Poles
0	8	0

Bubba Nissen (born February 5, 1960) is an American former NASCAR driver from Virginia. He competed in twenty-six races in what is now the NASCAR O'Reilly Auto Parts Series between 1982 and 1985, driving for his own team in most races.

== 1982 season ==
Nissen's best finish in the series would come in his debut, finishing second to Tommy Houston at Richmond. He drove a self-owned #95 Pontiac. Nissen entered a total of eight races in 1982, all of which were in his home state of Virginia, earning five top-ten finishes.

== 1983 season and injury ==
In 1983, Nissen finished twentieth in the season opening race at Daytona. He would only start one more race during the season at Rockingham in March. On lap 148, Nissen was involved in a severe accident from which he suffered a broken leg and face lacerations. The race would be ended early following the incident, since the angle of the crash damaged the track's guard rail and concrete barrier.

== 1984 season ==
Nissen would make a comeback in 1984, running twelve of the twenty-nine races. He scored three top-10 finishes, including his second and final top-five finish, a fifth place at Langley Speedway.

== 1985 season ==
Nissen would compete in four races in 1985, instead driving a #99 car sponsored by Nelson Building Supply. He would only finish one of these races, a fifteenth-place finish at Langley Speedway. The June race at South Boston Speedway would be his final career start, for which he was scored in twenty-second place, only completing thirty-five laps.
