= Pete Silva =

American politician

Member of New Hampshire House of Representatives for Hillsborough 35
- In office 2014–2016

Member of New Hampshire House of Representatives for Hillsborough 26
- In office 2008–2012

Personal details
- Party: Republican

Peter (Pete) L. Silva is an American politician. He represented Hillsborough County in the New Hampshire House of Representatives until 2016. Silva was majority leader. He is of Cape Verdean descent.
