= Kelley Earnhardt Miller =

American stock car racing team owner and former driver

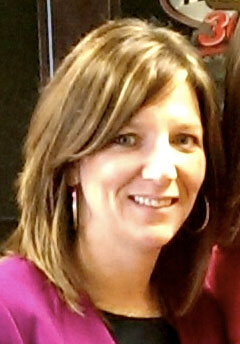
- Born: Kelley King Earnhardt; August 28, 1972 (age 53); Kannapolis, North Carolina, U.S.
- Occupations: Race team co-owner and manager
- Employer: JR Motorsports
- Title: Chief Executive Officer
- Spouse(s): L. W. Miller III; Ray Holm (divorced); Jimmy Elledge (divorced)
- Children: 3
- Parents: Dale Earnhardt (father); Brenda Gee (mother)

Kelley King Earnhardt Miller (née Earnhardt; formerly Earnhardt-Elledge; born August 28, 1972) is an American businesswoman. She is the chief executive officer of JR Motorsports which she co-owns with her brother, Dale Earnhardt Jr. and she is the daughter of Dale Earnhardt. The team's driver Chase Elliott won the 2014 NASCAR Nationwide Series title. In 2018, Tyler Reddick, another driver for JR Motorsports, won the 2018 NASCAR Xfinity Series Championship. In 2024, Justin Allgaier, won the 2024 NASCAR Xfinity Series Championship.

== Racing career ==
=== Driving career ===
She learned how to drive from her father and she would drive a car around the family farm since she was about 12 or 13 years old. Earnhardt Miller raced stock cars at local tracks. Her father Dale Earnhardt reportedly said that she might be the next great driver from the Earnhardt family because of what ESPN described as her "aggression, mental toughness, a willingness to push the car to its limit". Her cousin Tony Eury Jr. said, "She was very good at what she did. I raced her several times over at Tri-County [Racetrack in Brasstown, N.C.]. We thought she probably had as much or more talent than any of them." She raced more frequently at Hickory Motor Speedway and Myrtle Beach Speedway. Her father hired Dale Jr. to work on her race cars, including building one from scratch, while the two were local race car drivers. She raced after graduating from University of North Carolina at Charlotte and ended her racing career in 1996.

=== Team owner career ===
Earnhardt Miller co-owns JR Motorsports with her brother Dale Earnhardt Jr., her cousin Tony Eury Jr., and Rick Hendrick. She is credited with bringing Danica Patrick to the team's Nationwide Series car.

=== Other business interests ===
On July 29, 2019, agricultural company Brandt appointed Earnhardt Miller into the board of directors. Brandt is currently one of JR Motorsports' partners, sponsoring the No. 7 team.

== Personal life ==
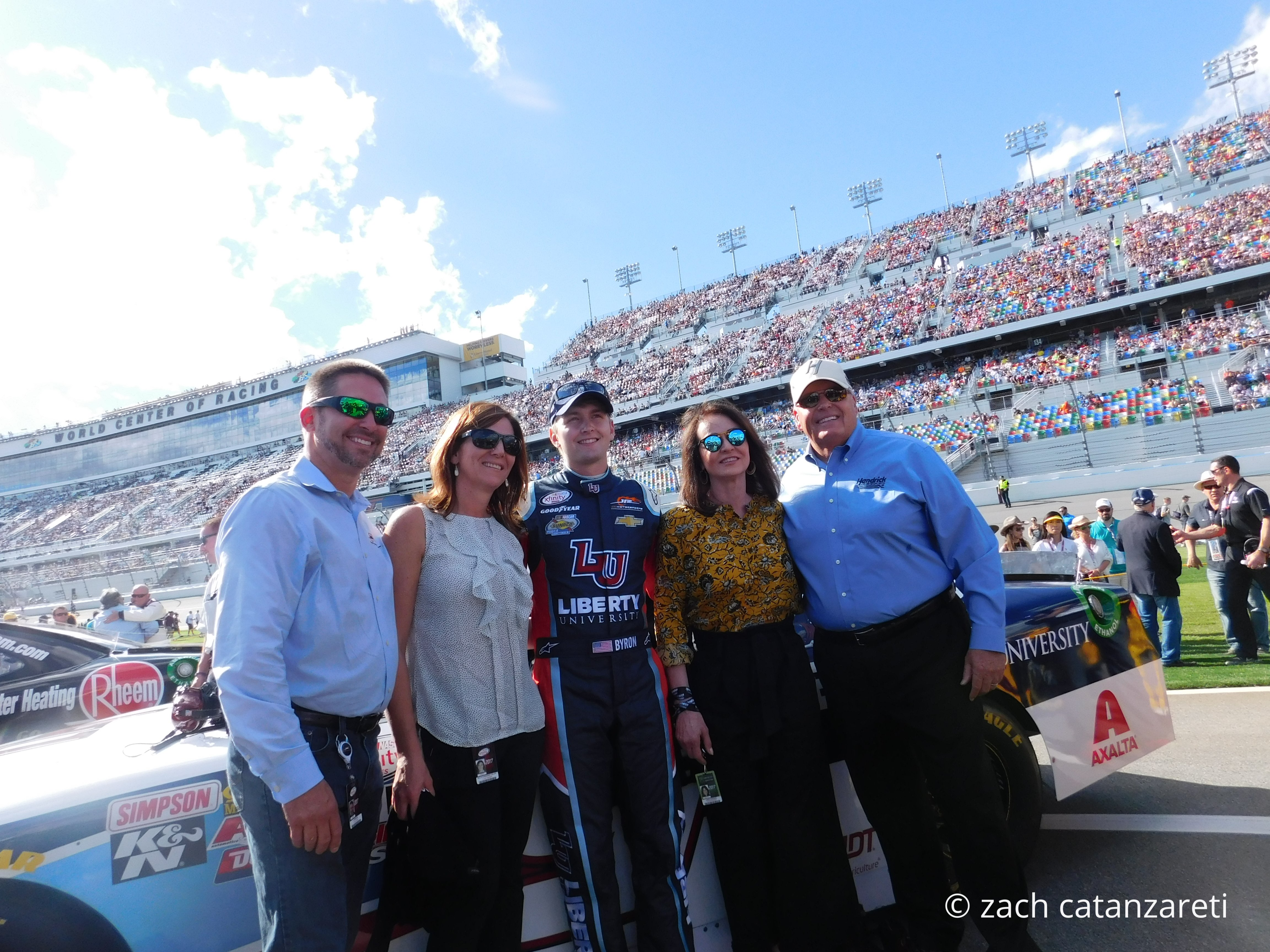
Earnhardt Miller with her husband L. W., Rick and Linda Hendrick, and William Byron at Daytona in February 2017

Kelley Earnhardt Miller was born to Dale Earnhardt and his second wife Brenda Lorraine Jackson (née Gee). She has a younger brother, Dale Jr.; an elder half-brother, Kerry, from her father's first marriage; and a younger half-sister, Taylor Earnhardt-Putnam, from her father's third marriage.

Kelley's parents divorced shortly after Dale Jr. was born, and they lived with Brenda until their house was destroyed in a fire when she was eight years old in 1980. As Brenda had no financial support after the fire, she gave up custody of the two children to Earnhardt Sr. prior to his marriage to Teresa Houston. During her childhood, Kelley took care of Dale Jr. while their father and Teresa were busy with the race seasons. Three weeks after 12-year-old Dale Jr. was sent by his father and Teresa to a military school for delinquency, Kelley left high school to join him in 1986.

Kelley attended University of North Carolina Wilmington until transferring to the University of North Carolina at Charlotte to be closer to home.

As soon as Dale Jr. started earning money in his racing career, Kelley offered to handle his finances.

She married Raymond Walter Holm Jr. on June 29, 2001, in Mecklenburg County, North Carolina. They were divorced by 2004 in Iredell County, North Carolina.

She was formerly married to Jimmy Elledge, by whom she has two daughters. After divorcing Elledge, she married former NASCAR driver L. W. Miller III on January 22, 2011. The couple has one child.

Kelley's daughter Karsyn Elledge participates in midget car racing. She scored her first win at Millbridge Speedway on April 19, 2018. Karsyn made her first Chili Bowl start in January 2019.

On April 22, 2019, Brenda Jackson, Earnhardt's biological mother, died at the age of 65 after suffering from cancer for years. She had served as an accounting specialist for JR Motorsports since 2004.
