= Sam Ard =

American racing driver (1939–2017)

- Born: February 14, 1939; Pamplico, South Carolina, U.S.
- Died: April 2, 2017 (aged 78); Florence, South Carolina, U.S.
- Achievements: 1983, 1984 NASCAR Busch Series Champion; Tied with Noah Gragson and Connor Zilisch for most consecutive wins in the NASCAR Xfinity Series (4 in 1983)
- Awards: 1983, 1984 Busch Series Most Popular Driver; Named one of NASCAR's 75 Greatest Drivers (2023)

NASCAR Cup Series career
- 1 race run over 1 year
- Best finish: 104th (1984)
- First race: 1984 Goody's 500 (Martinsville)
Wins	Top tens	Poles
0	0	0

NASCAR O'Reilly Auto Parts Series career
- 92 races run over 3 years
- Best finish: 1st (1983, 1984)
- First race: 1982 Goody's 300 (Daytona)
- Last race: 1984 Komfort Koach 200 (Rockingham)
- First win: 1982 Dogwood 500 (Martinsville)
- Last win: 1984 Coca-Cola 300 (North Wilkesboro)
Wins	Top tens	Poles
22	79	24

Samuel Julian Ard (February 14, 1939 – April 2, 2017) was an American professional stock car racing driver. He won two NASCAR Budweiser Late Model Sportsman Series championships, in 1983 and 1984. Ard also made one NASCAR Winston Cup start. He retired from driving after being injured in late 1984 and became a car owner. He had Parkinson's disease later in life and died in April 2017 at age 78.

== Racing career ==
=== Late Model Sportsman Division (1975–1981) ===
Ard was a regular competitor, earning at least nine wins and scoring multiple top-five finishes. In 1981, Ard finished fifth in the season-long NASCAR National Championship point standings.

=== Late Model Sportsman / Busch Grand National Series ===
Ard was the runner-up in 1982 of NASCAR's Late Model Sportsman Series, winning four races and finishing out of the top ten only six times.

On the heels of that season, Ard won ten races and had twenty-three top-five finishes, and won the 1983 NASCAR Budweiser Late Model Sportsman Series (now NASCAR O'Reilly Auto Parts Series) points championship.

Ard continued his dominant streak in 1984, with eight wins and twenty-four top-fives in 28 starts.

Ard was seriously injured in a crash at the Rockingham Speedway on October 20, 1984. Despite missing the season's final race at Martinsville, Ard captured the Busch Grand National championship for the second year in a row, but was never able to race again.

Ard previously held the record for most consecutive top-fives in the series with 15 until Connor Zilisch broke the record in 2025. Zilisch and Noah Gragson have both tied Ard's record for most consecutive wins in the series with 4.

=== Winston Cup Series ===
Ard made his first and only Winston Cup Series start on September 23, 1984, at Martinsville. He started 27th in the 31-car field but lasted just one lap before a steering failure ended his day.

== Post-racing career ==
After retiring as a driver, Ard became an owner, fielding cars for several drivers, most notably Jimmy Hensley and Jeff Burton, who claimed his first Grand National win driving Ard's car.

=== Later life and death ===
Ard battled Alzheimer's disease and Parkinson's disease. His family often received donations and aid from the racing community to help him. In 2006, drivers Kevin Harvick and Dale Earnhardt Jr. led a charge to donate a substantial amount of funds for the care of Ard and his family. After tying Ard's Nationwide Series single-season victory record in 2008, Kyle Busch announced that he would give $100,000 to aid Ard's family with his care and mounting medical expenses in his honor.

Ard died on April 2, 2017, at the age of 78.

== Personal life ==
Ard served in the Vietnam War as a member of the United States Air Force. He married his wife Jo in 1961, and they had four children.

== Motorsports career results ==
=== NASCAR ===
(key) (Bold – Pole position awarded by qualifying time. Italics – Pole position earned by points standings or practice time. * – Most laps led.)

==== Winston Cup Series ====
NASCAR Winston Cup Series results
Year	Team	No.	Make	1	2	3	4	5	6	7	8	9	10	11	12	13	14	15	16	17	18	19	20	21	22	23	24	25	26	27	28	29	30	NWCC	Pts	Ref
1984	Zervakis Enterprises	02	Chevy	DAY	RCH	CAR	ATL	BRI	NWS	DAR	MAR	TAL	NSV	DOV	CLT	RSD	POC	MCH	DAY	NSV	POC	TAL	MCH	BRI	DAR	RCH	DOV	MAR; 31	CLT	NWS	CAR	ATL	RSD	104th	0^{1}	

^{1} Ard's team was a post-entry for the race and thus did not receive points.

==== Busch Series ====
NASCAR Busch Series results
Year	Team	No.	Make	1	2	3	4	5	6	7	8	9	10	11	12	13	14	15	16	17	18	19	20	21	22	23	24	25	26	27	28	29	30	31	32	33	34	35	NBSC	Pts	Ref
1982	Thomas Brothers Racing	00	Olds	DAY; 3	RCH; 21		MAR; 1	DAR; 6	**HCY**; 2	SBO; 1	**CRW**; 3	**RCH**; 2	LGY; 2	DOV; 17	HCY; 2	CLT; 12	ASH; 3	HCY; 3	SBO; 2	CAR; 5	**CRW**; 2	SBO; 1	HCY; 5	LGY; 3	**IRP**; 28	BRI; 9	**HCY**; 2	RCH; 3	**MAR**; 1	CLT; 2	HCY; 18	MAR; 6							2nd	4448	
1982	Thomas Brothers Racing	00	Chevy			BRI; 20																																	2nd	4448	
1983	Thomas Brothers Racing	00	Olds	**DAY**; 6	**RCH**; 1	CAR; 12	HCY; 3	**MAR**; 1*	NWS; 1*	SBO; 25	**GPS**; 9	LGY; 7	DOV; 3	**BRI**; 9	CLT; 32	SBO; 11	HCY; 3	**ROU**; 4	SBO; 15	**ROU**; 4	**CRW**; 7*	**ROU**; 3	SBO; 4	**HCY**; 1*	LGY; 7	IRP; 3	GPS; 6	BRI; 1*	HCY; 5	DAR; 2	RCH; 5	NWS; 5	SBO; 1*	**MAR**; 1*	ROU; 1	CLT; 1	HCY; 2	MAR; 1*	1st	5454	
1984	Thomas Brothers Racing	00	Olds	DAY; 4*	RCH; 1*	**CAR**; 1*	HCY; 3	MAR; 9	DAR; 4*	ROU; 3	**NSV**; 2*	LGY; 1*	MLW; 1*	DOV; 1*	CLT; 6	**SBO**; 1*	**HCY**; 4	ROU; 3	**SBO**; 1*	ROU; 3	HCY; 3	IRP; 2	**LGY**; 2	SBO; 5	BRI; 2	DAR; 2	RCH; 11	NWS; 1*	CLT; 3*	**HCY**; 5	CAR; 33	MAR							1st	4552	

=== ARCA Permatex SuperCar Series ===
(key) (Bold – Pole position awarded by qualifying time. Italics – Pole position earned by points standings or practice time. * – Most laps led.)

ARCA Permatex SuperCar Series results
Year	Team	No.	Make	1	2	3	4	5	6	7	8	9	10	11	12	13	14	15	16	17	18	19	20	APSC	Pts	Ref
1983	Thomas Brothers Racing	10	Olds	DAY; 36	NSV	TAL	LPR	LPR	ISF	IRP	SSP	FRS	BFS	WIN	LPR	POC	TAL	MCS	FRS	MIL	DSF	ZAN	SND	NA	-	

Preceded by Jack Ingram	NASCAR Budweiser Late Model Sportsman Champion; 1983–1984	Succeeded by Jack Ingram
