= NASCAR O'Reilly Auto Parts Series at Richmond Raceway =

NASCAR Xfinity Series races at Richmond Raceway

NASCAR O'Reilly Auto Parts Series
- Venue: Richmond Raceway
- Location: Richmond, Virginia, U.S.

Circuit information
- Surface: Asphalt
- Length: 0.75 mi (1.21 km)
- Turns: 4

Stock car racing events in the NASCAR O'Reilly Auto Parts Series were held at Richmond Raceway, in Richmond, Virginia during numerous seasons and times of year since 1982.

== Current race ==
TBA
- First race: 1982
- Previous names: Harvest 150 (1982); Miller Time 150 (1983); Miller 150 (1984); 7-Eleven 150 (1985); Freedlander 200 (1986–1987); Commonwealth 200 (1988–1989); Autolite 200 (1990–1992); Autolite 250 (1993–1995); Autolite Platinum 250 (1996–1999); Autolite / Fram 250 (2000–2001); Funai 250 (2002–2003); Emerson Radio 250 (2004–2008); Virginia 529 College Savings 250 (2009–2017); Go Bowling 250 (2018–2021)
- Most wins (driver): Kevin Harvick; Kyle Busch (4)
- Most wins (team): Dale Earnhardt, Inc. Joe Gibbs Racing (5)
- Most wins (manufacturer): Chevrolet (16)

The NASCAR O'Reilly Auto Parts Series at Richmond Raceway is a NASCAR O'Reilly Auto Parts Series stock car race that took place at Richmond Raceway in Richmond, Virginia in the month of September. It is held the night before the NASCAR Cup Series race, the Cook Out 400. Noah Gragson won is the defending race winner.

In 2018, as part of schedule realignment, the event became the first race of the NASCAR Xfinity Series playoffs.

In 2020, as part of schedule realignment, this became the only Xfinity Series race at the track as NASCAR decided to give the track one Truck Series race instead. This schedule change was done in a swap with Martinsville Speedway, which previously had two Truck Series races and zero Xfinity Series races and would now have one Truck Series race and one Xfinity Series race (which replaced the spring race at Richmond).

In 2022, the September Xfinity Series race at Richmond was moved to the spring (in exchange for moving the Truck Series race to the summer race weekend) and there was no September race at the track for the first time in the series' history.

On August 13, 2026, it was announced that the series would return to the track in 2027, as the opening race of The Chase.

=== Past winners ===
| Year | Date | No. | Driver | Team | Manufacturer | Race Distance | | Race Time | Average Speed (mph) | Report |
| Year | Date | No. | Driver | Team | Manufacturer | Laps | Miles (km) | Race Time | Average Speed (mph) | Report |
|---|---|---|---|---|---|---|---|---|---|---|
| 1982 | September 11 | 01 | Butch Lindley | Emanuel Zervakis | Pontiac | 150 | 81.3 (130.839) | 1:03:29 | 76.839 | Report |
| 1983 | September 10 | 7 | Morgan Shepherd | Whitaker Racing | Oldsmobile | 150 | 81.3 (130.839) | 1:16:24 | 63.848 | Report |
| 1984 | September 8 | 12 | Tommy Ellis | Ellis Racing | Pontiac | 150 | 81.3 (130.839) | 1:14:49 | 65.199 | Report |
| 1985 | September 7 | 12 | Tommy Ellis | Ellis Racing | Pontiac | 150 | 81.3 (130.839) | 1:00:54 | 80.539 | Report |
| 1986 | September 6 | 8 | Dale Earnhardt | Dale Earnhardt, Inc. | Chevrolet | 200 | 108.4 (174.452) | 1:25:23 | 76.174 | Report |
| 1987* | September 12 | 21 | Mark Martin | Bruce Lawmaster | Ford | 180* | 97.56 (157.007) | 1:28:27 | 66.18 | Report |
| 1988 | September 10 | 7 | Harry Gant | Whitaker Racing | Buick | 200 | 150 (241.401) | 1:40:38 | 89.434 | Report |
| 1989 | September 9 | 8 | Bobby Hamilton | FILMAR Racing | Oldsmobile | 200 | 150 (241.401) | 1:37:45 | 92.071 | Report |
| 1990 | September 8 | 22 | Rick Mast | A.G. Dillard Motorsports | Buick | 200 | 150 (241.401) | 1:30:13 | 99.759 | Report |
| 1991* | September 6 | 7 | Harry Gant | Whitaker Racing | Buick | 200 | 150 (241.401) | 1:43:47 | 86.719 | Report |
| 1992 | September 11 | 59 | Robert Pressley | Alliance Motorsports | Oldsmobile | 200 | 150 (241.401) | 1:34:22 | 95.373 | Report |
| 1993 | September 10 | 60 | Mark Martin | Roush Racing | Ford | 250 | 187.5 (301.752) | 1:54:12 | 98.511 | Report |
| 1994 | September 9 | 8 | Kenny Wallace | FILMAR Racing | Ford | 250 | 187.5 (301.752) | 1:55:24 | 97.487 | Report |
| 1995 | September 8 | 32 | Dale Jarrett | Dale Jarrett | Ford | 250 | 187.5 (301.752) | 1:47:13 | 104.928 | Report |
| 1996 | September 8* | 8 | Kenny Wallace | FILMAR Racing | Ford | 250 | 187.5 (301.752) | 1:51:24 | 100.987 | Report |
| 1997 | September 5 | 3 | Steve Park | Dale Earnhardt, Inc. | Chevrolet | 250 | 187.5 (301.752) | 2:24:42 | 77.747 | Report |
| 1998 | September 11 | 3 | Dale Earnhardt Jr. | Dale Earnhardt, Inc. | Chevrolet | 250 | 187.5 (301.752) | 2:17:05 | 82.067 | Report |
| 1999 | September 10 | 3 | Dale Earnhardt Jr. | Dale Earnhardt, Inc. | Chevrolet | 250 | 187.5 (301.752) | 2:08:12 | 87.754 | Report |
| 2000 | September 8 | 9 | Jeff Burton | Roush Racing | Ford | 250 | 187.5 (301.752) | 2:06:07 | 89.203 | Report |
| 2001 | September 7 | 1 | Jimmy Spencer | Phoenix Racing | Chevrolet | 250 | 187.5 (301.752) | 2:04:47 | 90.156 | Report |
| 2002 | September 6 | 8 | Dale Earnhardt Jr. | Dale Earnhardt, Inc. | Chevrolet | 250 | 187.5 (301.752) | 2:24:04 | 78.089 | Report |
| 2003 | September 5 | 43 | Johnny Sauter | Curb Racing | Chevrolet | 250 | 187.5 (301.752) | 1:53:01 | 99.543 | Report |
| 2004 | September 10 | 55 | Robby Gordon | Robby Gordon Motorsports | Chevrolet | 250 | 187.5 (301.752) | 2:10:15 | 86.372 | Report |
| 2005 | September 9 | 21 | Kevin Harvick | Richard Childress Racing | Chevrolet | 253* | 189.75 (305.373) | 2:08:27 | 88.634 | Report |
| 2006 | September 8 | 21 | Kevin Harvick | Richard Childress Racing | Chevrolet | 250 | 187.5 (301.752) | 2:11:23 | 85.627 | Report |
| 2007 | September 7 | 5 | Kyle Busch | Hendrick Motorsports | Chevrolet | 252* | 189 (304.166) | 2:00:45 | 93.913 | Report |
| 2008 | September 7* | 60 | Carl Edwards | Roush Fenway Racing | Ford | 250 | 187.5 (301.752) | 2:03:55 | 90.787 | Report |
| 2009 | September 11 | 60 | Carl Edwards | Roush Fenway Racing | Ford | 250 | 187.5 (301.752) | 1:50:53 | 101.458 | Report |
| 2010 | September 10 | 33 | Kevin Harvick | Kevin Harvick Inc. | Chevrolet | 250 | 187.5 (301.752) | 1:54:45 | 98.039 | Report |
| 2011 | September 9 | 18 | Kyle Busch | Joe Gibbs Racing | Toyota | 250 | 187.5 (301.752) | 2:03:45 | 90.909 | Report |
| 2012 | September 7 | 33 | Kevin Harvick | Richard Childress Racing | Chevrolet | 250 | 187.5 (301.752) | 2:02:39 | 91.724 | Report |
| 2013* | September 6 | 22 | Brad Keselowski | Penske Racing | Ford | 250 | 187.5 (301.752) | 1:55:37 | 97.304 | Report |
| 2014 | September 5 | 54 | Kyle Busch* | Joe Gibbs Racing | Toyota | 250 | 187.5 (301.752) | 2:01:11 | 92.835 | Report |
| 2015 | September 11 | 9 | Chase Elliott | JR Motorsports | Chevrolet | 250 | 187.5 (301.752) | 2:04:54 | 90.072 | Report |
| 2016 | September 9 | 18 | Kyle Busch | Joe Gibbs Racing | Toyota | 250 | 187.5 (301.752) | 1:48:30 | 103.687 | Report |
| 2017 | September 8 | 22 | Brad Keselowski | Team Penske | Ford | 250 | 187.5 (301.752) | 1:55:15 | 97.614 | Report |
| 2018 | September 21 | 20 | Christopher Bell | Joe Gibbs Racing | Toyota | 250 | 187.5 (301.752) | 2:03:08 | 91.364 | Report |
| 2019 | September 20 | 20 | Christopher Bell | Joe Gibbs Racing | Toyota | 250 | 187.5 (301.752) | 1:57:16 | 95.935 | Report |
| 2020* | September 11 | 7 | Justin Allgaier | JR Motorsports | Chevrolet | 250 | 187.5 (301.752) | 2:02:59 | 91.476 | Report |
| 2021 | September 11 | 9 | Noah Gragson | JR Motorsports | Chevrolet | 250 | 187.5 (301.752) | 2:14:57 | 83.364 | Report |
| 2022 – 2026 | Not Held | | | | | | | | | |
| 2027 | September 10 | | | | | | | | | Report |

- 1987: Race shortened due to rain. Last race on old half-mile layout.
- 1991: Race moved to a Friday night event.
- 1996: Race postponed from Friday to Sunday due to power outage.
- 2005 & 2007: Races extended due to NASCAR overtime.
- 2008: Race postponed from Friday to Sunday due to rain from Hurricane Hanna.
- 2013: Marked the 1,000th race held in series.
- 2014: Kyle Busch led all 250 laps.
- 2020: Race held as the first race of a doubleheader weekend (the second race replaced the race at Michigan International Speedway due to COVID-19).

=== Multiple winners (drivers) ===
| # Wins | Driver | Years won |
|---|---|---|
| 4 | Kevin Harvick | 2005–2006, 2010, 2012 |
| 4 | Kyle Busch | 2007, 2011, 2014, 2016 |
| 3 | Dale Earnhardt Jr. | 1998–1999, 2002 |
| 2 | Tommy Ellis | 1984–1985 |
| 2 | Mark Martin | 1987, 1993 |
| 2 | Harry Gant | 1988, 1991 |
| 2 | Kenny Wallace | 1994, 1996 |
| 2 | Carl Edwards | 2008–2009 |
| 2 | Brad Keselowski | 2013, 2017 |
| 2 | Christopher Bell | 2018–2019 |

==== Multiple winners (teams) ====
| # Wins | Team | Years won |
|---|---|---|
| 5 | Dale Earnhardt, Inc. | 1986, 1997–1999, 2002 |
| 5 | Joe Gibbs Racing | 2011, 2014, 2016, 2018–2019 |
| 4 | Roush Fenway Racing | 1993, 2000, 2008–2009 |
| 3 | Whitaker Racing | 1983, 1988, 1991 |
| 3 | FILMAR Racing | 1989, 1994, 1996 |
| 3 | Richard Childress Racing | 2005–2006, 2012 |
| 3 | JR Motorsports | 2015, 2020–2021 |
| 2 | Team Penske | 2013, 2017 |

==== Manufacturer wins ====
| # Wins | Make | Years won |
|---|---|---|
| 16 | (United States) Chevrolet | 1986, 1997–1999, 2001–2003, 2005–2007, 2010, 2012, 2015, 2020–2021 |
| 10 | (United States) Ford | 1987, 1993–1996, 2000, 2008–2009, 2013, 2017 |
| 5 | (Japan) Toyota | 2011, 2014, 2016, 2018–2019 |
| 3 | (United States) Pontiac | 1982, 1984–1985 |
| 3 | (United States) Oldsmobile | 1983, 1989, 1992 |
| 3 | (United States) Buick | 1988, 1990–1991 |

== Former second race ==
ToyotaCare 250

NASCAR Xfinity Series
- Venue: Richmond Raceway
- Location: Richmond, Virginia, U.S.
- Corporate sponsor: Toyota
- First race: 1982
- Last race: 2024
- Distance: 187.5 miles (301.8 km)
- Laps: 250; Stages 1/2: 75 each Final stage: 100
- Previous names: Eastern 150 (1982–1983); Wrangler 150 (1984); Pontiac 200 (1990–1991); Hardee's 200 (1992–1993); Hardee's Frisco 250 (1994); Hardee's 250 (1995, 1998–2003); Hardee's Fried Chicken 250 (1996–1997); Funai 250 (2004–2005); Circuit City 250 (2006–2007); Lipton Tea 250 (2008–2009); Bubba Burger 250 (2010–2011); Virginia 529 College Savings Plan 250 (2012); ToyotaCare 250 (2013–2019, 2022–2024); Virginia is for Racing Lovers 250 (2020)
- Most wins (driver): Denny Hamlin; Kevin Harvick; Mark Martin (3)
- Most wins (team): Joe Gibbs Racing (7)
- Most wins (manufacturer): Chevrolet (14)

Circuit information
- Surface: Asphalt
- Length: 0.75 mi (1.21 km)
- Turns: 4

The ToyotaCare 250 was a NASCAR Xfinity Series race that took place at Richmond Raceway in Richmond, Virginia. The race was first held during the inaugural season for the Xfinity Series in 1982 as a 150-lap event. The race was removed from the schedule after 1984. It returned to the series starting in 1990 as a 200 lap race. It was expanded to 250 lap distance in 1994. In 2016, as part of an overhauling of the Richmond spring race weekend, including the new Dash4Cash format, the total of 210-laps and had two 35-lap heat races and a 140-lap feature. In 2017, the heat races were discontinued (as a result of stage racing being implemented that year), and the race returned to its 250-lap distance with the new stage format: stages 1 and 2 were 75 laps long, and stage 3 made up the remaining 100 laps.

NASCAR removed the spring Richmond race in 2020 in favor of a race at Martinsville Speedway in October, though Richmond still maintained their other race on the Xfinity Series schedule in September, the Go Bowling 250. Even though Richmond lost one of their two Xfinity races, likely in exchange, NASCAR gave the track a Truck Series race to be run in April like the Xfinity Series. Despite the removal from the regular schedule, the race was briefly restored during the 2020 season as a replacement for the Michigan International Speedway event due to the COVID-19 pandemic, serving as the second round in a September doubleheader with the Go Bowling 250. Richmond downscaled to one race in 2021. In 2022, Richmond's one Xfinity Series race moved from September to April. The race was removed from the schedule after the 2025 schedule was announced, as NASCAR moved Richmond's date to Mexico City.

=== Past winners ===
| Year | Date | No. | Driver | Team | Manufacturer | Race Distance | | Race Time | Average Speed (mph) | Report |
| Year | Date | No. | Driver | Team | Manufacturer | Laps | Miles (km) | Race Time | Average Speed (mph) | Report |
|---|---|---|---|---|---|---|---|---|---|---|
| 1982 | February 20 | 6 | Tommy Houston | Mike Day | Chevrolet | 150 | 81.3 (130.839) | 1:24:35 | 57.667 | Report |
| 1983 | February 26 | 00 | Sam Ard | Thomas Brothers Racing | Oldsmobile | 150 | 81.3 (130.839) | 1:06:14 | 73.639 | Report |
| 1984 | February 25 | 00 | Sam Ard | Thomas Brothers Racing | Oldsmobile | 150 | 81.3 (130.839) | 1:04:58 | 75.084 | Report |
| 1985 – 1989 | Not held | | | | | | | | | |
| 1990 | February 24 | 30 | Michael Waltrip | Bahari Racing | Pontiac | 200 | 150 (241.401) | 1:42:10 | 88.091 | Report |
| 1991 | February 23 | 7 | Harry Gant | Whitaker Racing | Buick | 200 | 150 (241.401) | 1:37:40 | 92.156 | Report |
| 1992 | March 7 | 7 | Harry Gant | Whitaker Racing | Buick | 200 | 150 (241.401) | 1:32:15 | 97.561 | Report |
| 1993 | March 6 | 60 | Mark Martin | Roush Racing | Ford | 200 | 150 (241.401) | 1:26:44 | 103.766 | Report |
| 1994 | March 5 | 87 | Joe Nemechek | NEMCO Motorsports | Chevrolet | 250 | 187.5 (301.752) | 2:03:17 | 91.253 | Report |
| 1995 | March 4 | 8 | Kenny Wallace | FILMAR Racing | Ford | 250 | 187.5 (301.752) | 1:56:50 | 96.291 | Report |
| 1996 | March 2 | 4 | Jeff Purvis | Phoenix Racing | Chevrolet | 250 | 187.5 (301.752) | 1:54:36 | 98.168 | Report |
| 1997 | March 1 | 60 | Mark Martin | Roush Racing | Ford | 250 | 187.5 (301.752) | 2:10:08 | 86.45 | Report |
| 1998 | June 5 | 9 | Jeff Burton | Roush Racing | Ford | 250 | 187.5 (301.752) | 1:57:26 | 95.799 | Report |
| 1999 | May 14 | 60 | Mark Martin | Roush Racing | Ford | 250 | 187.5 (301.752) | 2:04:55 | 90.06 | Report |
| 2000 | May 5 | 10 | Jeff Green | ppc Racing | Chevrolet | 250 | 187.5 (301.752) | 2:18:51 | 81.023 | Report |
| 2001 | May 4 | 1 | Jimmy Spencer | Phoenix Racing | Chevrolet | 250 | 187.5 (301.752) | 2:13:53 | 84.028 | Report |
| 2002 | May 3 | 57 | Jason Keller | ppc Racing | Ford | 250 | 187.5 (301.752) | 2:20:23 | 80.138 | Report |
| 2003 | May 2 | 21 | Kevin Harvick | Richard Childress Racing | Chevrolet | 250 | 187.5 (301.752) | 2:30:42 | 74.652 | Report |
| 2004 | May 14 | 5 | Kyle Busch | Hendrick Motorsports | Chevrolet | 250 | 187.5 (301.752) | 2:12:19 | 85.023 | Report |
| 2005 | May 13 | 60 | Carl Edwards | Roush Racing | Ford | 253* | 189.75 (305.373) | 2:12:50 | 85.709 | Report |
| 2006 | May 5–6* | 21 | Kevin Harvick | Richard Childress Racing | Chevrolet | 250 | 187.5 (301.752) | 2:22:17 | 79.068 | Report |
| 2007 | May 4 | 2 | Clint Bowyer | Richard Childress Racing | Chevrolet | 250 | 187.5 (301.752) | 2:02:25 | 91.899 | Report |
| 2008 | May 2 | 20 | Denny Hamlin | Joe Gibbs Racing | Toyota | 253* | 189.75 (305.373) | 1:58:18 | 96.238 | Report |
| 2009 | May 1 | 18 | Kyle Busch | Joe Gibbs Racing | Toyota | 250 | 187.5 (301.752) | 2:09:48 | 86.672 | Report |
| 2010 | April 30 | 22 | Brad Keselowski | Penske Racing | Dodge | 252* | 189 (304.166) | 2:04:21 | 91.194 | Report |
| 2011 | April 29 | 20 | Denny Hamlin | Joe Gibbs Racing | Toyota | 251* | 188.25 (302.959) | 1:44:11 | 108.415 | Report |
| 2012 | April 27 | 54 | Kurt Busch | Kyle Busch Motorsports | Toyota | 250 | 187.5 (301.752) | 1:48:06 | 104.07 | Report |
| 2013 | April 26 | 22 | Brad Keselowski | Penske Racing | Ford | 250 | 187.5 (301.752) | 2:14:18 | 83.768 | Report |
| 2014 | April 25 | 5 | Kevin Harvick | JR Motorsports | Chevrolet | 250 | 187.5 (301.752) | 1:58:54 | 94.617 | Report |
| 2015 | April 24 | 20 | Denny Hamlin | Joe Gibbs Racing | Toyota | 250 | 187.5 (301.752) | 1:50:47 | 101.55 | Report |
| 2016* | April 23 | 88 | Dale Earnhardt Jr. | JR Motorsports | Chevrolet | 149* | 111.75 (179.844) | 1:11:37 | 93.623 | Report |
| 2017 | April 29 | 42 | Kyle Larson | Chip Ganassi Racing | Chevrolet | 254* | 190.5 (306.58) | 2:10:34 | 87.541 | Report |
| 2018 | April 20 | 20 | Christopher Bell | Joe Gibbs Racing | Toyota | 250 | 187.5 (301.752) | 2:00:36 | 93.284 | Report |
| 2019 | April 12 | 00 | Cole Custer | Stewart–Haas Racing with Biagi–DenBeste | Ford | 250 | 187.5 (301.752) | 2:04:17 | 90.519 | Report |
| 2020* | September 12 | 7 | Justin Allgaier | JR Motorsports | Chevrolet | 250 | 187.5 (301.752) | 2:01:46 | 92.39 | Report |
| 2021 | Not Held | | | | | | | | | |
| 2022 | April 2 | 54 | Ty Gibbs | Joe Gibbs Racing | Toyota | 250 | 187.5 (301.752) | 1:58:03 | 95.229 | Report |
| 2023 | April 1 | 16 | Chandler Smith | Kaulig Racing | Chevrolet | 250 | 187.5 (301.752) | 2:09:29 | 86.884 | Report |
| 2024 | March 30 | 81 | Chandler Smith | Joe Gibbs Racing | Toyota | 250 | 187.5 (301.752) | 2:18:35 | 81.179 | Report |

- 1984: 150 lap distance race time and average speed record.
- 1993: 200 lap distance race time and average speed record.
- 2005, 2008, 2010–11, and 2016–17: Race extended due to a NASCAR overtime finish.
- 2006: Race was delayed because of rain and finished at midnight.
- 2011: 250 lap distance race time and average speed record even with overtime.
- 2016: The main event was reduced to 140 laps, while 70 other laps were divided into two heat races for the Xfinity Dash 4 Cash program. However, due to a NASCAR overtime from a late caution, the race ran 149 laps instead.
- 2020: After initially being removed from the schedule, the race was added back as the second race of a September doubleheader due to COVID-19 (replacing the race at Michigan International Speedway).

==== Multiple winners (drivers) ====
| # Wins | Driver | Years won |
|---|---|---|
| 3 | Mark Martin | 1993, 1997, 1999 |
| 3 | Kevin Harvick | 2003, 2006, 2014 |
| 3 | Denny Hamlin | 2008, 2011, 2015 |
| 2 | Sam Ard | 1983, 1984 |
| 2 | Harry Gant | 1991, 1992 |
| 2 | Kyle Busch | 2004, 2009 |
| 2 | Brad Keselowski | 2010, 2013 |
| 2 | Chandler Smith | 2023, 2024 |

==== Multiple winners (teams) ====
| # Wins | Team | Years won |
|---|---|---|
| 7 | Joe Gibbs Racing | 2008, 2009, 2011, 2015, 2018, 2022, 2024 |
| 4 | Roush Racing | 1993, 1997–1999 |
| 3 | Richard Childress Racing | 2003, 2006, 2007 |
| 3 | JR Motorsports | 2014, 2016, 2020 |
| 2 | Thomas Brothers Racing | 1983, 1984 |
| 2 | Whitaker Racing | 1991, 1992 |
| 2 | Phoenix Racing | 1996, 2001 |
| 2 | ppc Racing | 2000, 2002 |
| 2 | Penske Racing | 2010, 2013 |

==== Manufacturer wins ====
| # Wins | Make | Years won |
|---|---|---|
| 14 | (United States) Chevrolet | 1982, 1994, 1996, 2000, 2001, 2003, 2004, 2006, 2007, 2014, 2016, 2017, 2020, 2023 |
| 9 | (United States) Ford | 1993, 1995, 1997–1999, 2002, 2005, 2013, 2019 |
| 8 | (Japan) Toyota | 2008, 2009, 2011, 2012, 2015, 2018, 2022, 2024 |
| 2 | (United States) Oldsmobile | 1983, 1984 |
| 2 | (United States) Buick | 1991, 1992 |
| 1 | (United States) Pontiac | 1990 |
| 1 | (United States) Dodge | 2010 |

| Previous race: Fleetio 200 | NASCAR O'Reilly Auto Parts Series; TBA | Next race: Mission 200 at The Glen |
