= NASCAR Busch Series at South Boston Speedway =

NASCAR Busch Series stock car race

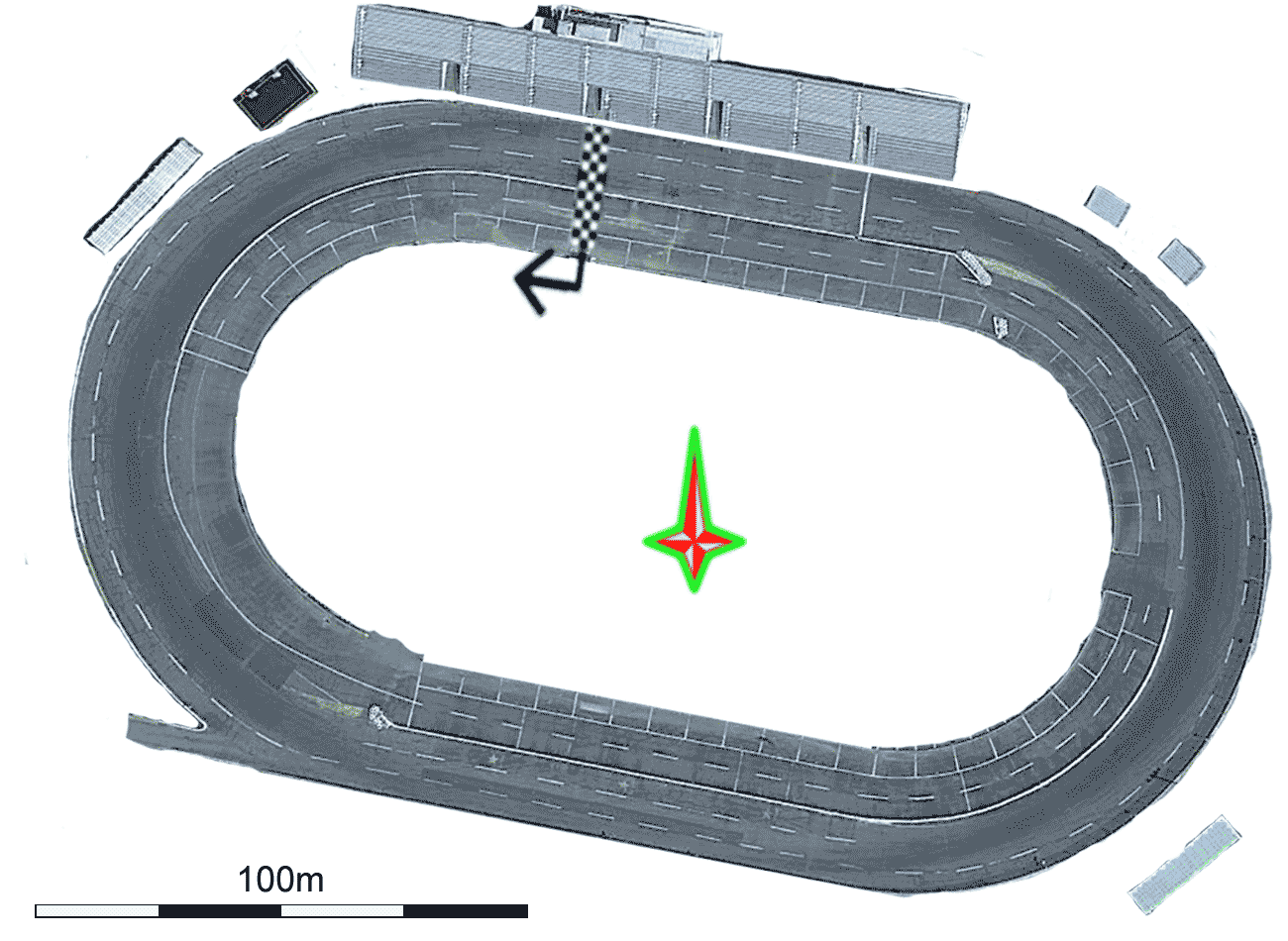

NASCAR Busch Series
- Venue: South Boston Speedway
- First race: 1982
- Last race: 2000
- Distance: 120 miles (193.1 km)
- Laps: 300
- Previous names: Lowe's 200 (1982); Miller 300 (1983–1984); Miller 200 (1985); Coors 200 (1986–1990); Coors Light 300 (1991); Ford Credit 300 (1994–1995); Winston Motorsports 300 (1996–1997); Lycos.com 300 presented by Valleydale Foods (1998); Textilease/Medique 300 presented by Advance Auto Parts (1999); Textilease/Medique 300 (2000)

Stock car races in the now-NASCAR O'Reilly Auto Parts Series were held at South Boston Speedway, in South Boston, Virginia, between 1982 and 2000. The races held at the track were one of the inaugural events of the series from its 1982 season.

Multiple races were held at the track in the race's early days: three were held in 1982, five in 1983, back to three in 1984 to 1985, four in 1986, before downsizing to two races from 1987 to 1991. No Busch Series events were held at South Boston Speedway in 1992 or 1993, during which time the track was reconfigured from 0.357 mi (0.575 km) to 0.400 mi (0.644 km) in length, but in 1994 a single race returned to the track, and was run annually until 2000, after which South Boston Speedway departed the series schedule. The race distance was 200 laps (71.4 miles (114.9 km)) in 1982 and from 1985 to 1990, 300 laps (107.1 miles (172.4 km)) from 1983 to 1984 and in 1991, and 300 laps (120 miles (193.1 km)) from 1994 to 2000.

Tommy Houston won the race three times, the most of any driver; Dennis Setzer scored his first career Busch Series victory in the 1994 event.

== Past winners ==
Year	Date	Driver	Team	Manufacturer	Race Distance		Race Time	Average Speed (mph)	Ref
Year	Date	Driver	Team	Manufacturer	Laps	Miles (km)	Race Time	Average Speed (mph)	Ref
1982	July 24	Sam Ard	Thomas Brothers Racing	Oldsmobile	200	71.4 (114.91)	0:57.49	74.096	
1983	September 17	Sam Ard	Thomas Brothers Racing	Oldsmobile	300	107.1 (172.36)	1:22.17	78.096	
1984	August 18	Tommy Houston	Mason Day Racing	Chevrolet	300	107.1 (172.36)	1:50:59	57.9	
1985	July 20	Jack Ingram	Jack Ingram Racing	Pontiac	200	71.4 (114.91)	1:01:58	69.133	
1986	June 28	Jack Ingram	Jack Ingram Racing	Pontiac	200	71.4 (114.91)	0:57:20	74.72	
1987	July 18	Larry Pearson	Pearson Racing	Chevrolet	200	71.4 (114.91)	0:52:56	80.931	
1988	July 16	Larry Pearson	Pearson Racing	Chevrolet	200	71.4 (114.91)	0:56:29	75.845	
1989	July 15	Tommy Houston	Arndt Racing	Buick	200	71.4 (114.91)	1:05:57	64.958	
1990	July 21	Tommy Houston	Houston Racing	Buick	200	71.4 (114.91)	0:53:33	80	
1991	July 20	Steve Grissom	Grissom Racing Enterprises	Oldsmobile	300	107.1 (172.36)	1:37:54	65.638	
1992 – 1993	Not held								
1994	July 16	Dennis Setzer	Alliance Motorsports	Chevrolet	300	120 (193.12)	1:54:15	63.02	
1995	July 29	Chad Little	Mark Rypien Motorsports	Ford	300	120 (193.12)	1:42:33	70.21	
1996	June 8	Todd Bodine	Pro Tech Motorsports	Chevrolet	300	120 (193.12)	1:41:43	70.785	
1997	June 13	Randy LaJoie	BACE Motorsports	Chevrolet	300	120 (193.12)	1:56:44	61.679	
1998	July 25	Tim Fedewa	BACE Motorsports	Chevrolet	300	120 (193.12)	1:49:07	65.984	
1999	June 12	Dale Earnhardt Jr.	Dale Earnhardt, Inc.	Chevrolet	300	120 (193.12)	1:52:43	63.877	
2000	June 10	Jeff Green	ppc Racing	Chevrolet	300	120 (193.12)	2:09:33	55.577	
