= Butch Lindley =

American racing driver (1948–1990)

- Born: Clyde Lindley, Jr. March 25, 1948; Greenville, South Carolina, U.S.
- Died: June 6, 1990 (aged 42); Greer, South Carolina, U.S.
- Cause of death: Head injury suffered while racing
- Achievements: 1977, 1978 NASCAR Sportsman Division champion 1972 Greenville-Pickens Speedway Late Model Champion

NASCAR Cup Series career
- 11 races run over 5 years
- Best finish: 42nd (1982)
- First race: 1979 Old Dominion 500 (Martinsville)
- Last race: 1985 Miller High Life 400 (Richmond)
Wins	Top tens	Poles
0	1	0

NASCAR O'Reilly Auto Parts Series career
- 41 races run over 3 years
- Best finish: 9th (1982)
- First race: 1982 Southeastern 150 (Bristol)
- Last race: 1984 Cardinal 250 (Martinsville)
- First win: 1982 Spring 220 (Richmond)
- Last win: 1983 DAPCO 200 (Greenville-Pickens)
Wins	Top tens	Poles
6	22	5

NASCAR Grand National East Series career
- 2 races run over 1 year
- First race: 1972 Sandlapper 200 (Columbia)
- Last race: 1972 Gamecock 200 (Columbia)
Wins	Top tens	Poles
0	1	0

Clyde J. "Butch" Lindley Jr. (March 25, 1948 – June 6, 1990) was an American short track racer. He was the champion of the NASCAR Sportsman Division in 1977 and 1978.

== Early life and start of career ==
Clyde Lindley Jr., nicknamed Butch, was born in Greenville, South Carolina on March 25, 1948. He began racing as a boy and pursued it as a full-time career from his late teens.

Lindley established himself as one of the country's premier short track drivers, winning track championships at Greenville-Pickens Speedway, and finishing first in races at short tracks throughout the United States. During his career Lindley won more than 500 races, perhaps as many as 550. During the six-year span from 1975 through 1980,ë he started 385 NASCAR sanctioned events and won 154 times.

Of Lindley's wins, four took place in races recognised today as major Super Late Model shows -- the Snowball Derby in 1984, the Oxford Plains Speedway 250 in 1976, the All American 400 at Fairgrounds Speedway in 1981, and the Thunder Road International Speedbowl Vermont Milk Bowl in 1977. He was one of the few Southern drivers who successfully won the Northern late model scene.

== NASCAR National Sportsman career ==
Lindley was a regular competitor in the NASCAR Sportsman Division for several years. From 1974 through 1976 he finished second, third and third in the final points standings.

Lindley won the 1977 NASCAR National Sportsman championship with a total of 7,566 points.

In 1978, Lindley again captured the National Sportsman championship, finishing with 8,148 points. He competed in eighty events and finished in the top five 58 times, including 23 wins.

In 1979, Lindley finished second in points, and in 1980, he was fifth.

Lindley continued a limited schedule in the Sportsman series after it became known as the Budweiser and then the Busch Series. He ran half of the 1982 schedule for Emanuel Zervakis, making fourteen starts and finishing in the top-ten ten times, including four wins. He also won two poles. The first win came at Richmond, followed by wins at South Boston Speedway and the season finale at Martinsville. Despite only competing in half of the events, he finished in ninth place in the final points standings.

Lindley ran 25 of the 35 races in 1983. Lindley won three poles and posted eleven top-ten finishes. He won races at Greenville-Pickens Speedway, South Boston Speedway, and Caraway Speedway despite switching between the Emanuel Zervakis and Dana Racing teams. Despite running only a partial schedule, Lindley still finished 13th in the final point standings.

Lindley made two starts in 1984, both for Ed Whitaker. In his first outing for the team, he started seventh and finished third at Richmond. Later in the year, he started seventh at Martinsville and was running well before engine failure relegated him to a 29th-place finish.

== All Pro Super Series career ==
The All Pro Super Series was a stock car racing organization which operated from 1981 to 1990 by promote Bob Harmon (who later founded the All American 400 at the Nashville Fairgrounds). It was subsequently purchased by NASCAR, and operated as the NASCAR AutoZone Elite Division, Southeast Series until it was terminated in 2006.

Having run in selected races of the All Pro Super Series from 1981 to 1983, in 1984, Lindley participated in all 24 events. He finished in the top-five thirteen times, including seven wins, and was fourth in the final points standings.

In 1985, Lindley took part in four of 26 races in the All Pro Super series, and won twice. It was the fourth race where he was killed.

== NASCAR Grand National career ==
Lindley made his debut in the Winston Cup Series in 1979. He started fourteenth in a Kenny Childers Chevrolet at Martinsville and finished 28th after falling out early due to overheating.

In 1981, Lindley made three starts in his own car, the No. 26 Chevrolet. He qualified fourth at Martinsville, but struggled in all three races. He did not finish any, and his best run was 24th at North Wilkesboro.

In 1982, Lindley made four starts and finished only one. Driving the No. 01 Emanuel Zervakis Racing Buick, Lindley started 14th at Martinsville. He dominated the middle portion of the race, leading the most laps of his Grand National career (163), and finished second to Harry Gant. In his return to Martinsville later in the year, Lindley led two laps before dropping out due to engine failure.

Lindley made two starts in 1983. Driving for Zervakis in the spring race at Richmond, Lindley led seven laps and came away with an eleventh-place finish. He also ran at Martinsville for Bill Terry, recording a 25th-place finish.

Lindley's last career Grand National start came at Richmond in 1985 for Bobby Hawkins in a car with Larry McReynolds as crew chief. He drove the No. 16 Carolina Tool Chevrolet, started seventeenth and was running near the front before a lug bolt fell off and he settled for a nineteenth place finish.

== Fatal crash ==
On April 13, 1985, Lindley was competing in an All Pro Super Series race held at the Desoto Speedway in Bradenton, Florida, driving Frankie Grill's No. 15 Chevrolet Camaro. He was leading after the 125-lap distance was complete, but the scheduled distance included a late caution flag, and All Pro rules stated that the final five laps of its races had to finish consecutively under the green flag, so the race continued. During the extra laps, a trailing arm on Lindley's car pulled apart as he entered turn three, sending the car into a spin that caused the driver's side to hit the wall. Lindley's helmet made hard contact with the wall, and he sustained a closed head injury. His crash was one of the factors that led to improvements in window nets, helmets, and head and neck restraints, which have dramatically reduced the number of injuries and deaths resulting from race car crashes.

== Death and burial ==
Lindley remained in a coma until his death. He died over five years later at an assisted living facility in Greer, South Carolina on June 6, 1990. He is buried at Springwood Cemetery in Greenville.

== Family ==
In 1965, Lindley married Flora Joan Barbare, known as Joan. She frequently traveled with him and assisted his race teams, and Joan was scoring laps during the race when he sustained his fatal injuries. Butch and Joan Lindley had two children, daughter Tonda and son Mardy.

Mardy pursued a career in racing, driving at Southeastern short tracks including the United Speed Alliance Pro Cup. He later became a mechanic for Roush Fenway Racing, coincidentally on the No. 16 team, the car number most often associated with his father. He later served at HScott Motorsports as a crew chief in the K&N Pro Series, winning the 2013 championship, having worked later with Rico Abreu. Later he served in ARCA with Lorin Ranier, the son of a former NASCAR car owner himself, at MDM-Ranier Racing, again as a crew chief.

On November 17, 2022, Mardy was named crew chief for JR Motorsports' No. 1 car with Sam Mayer driving, with the partnership scoring five wins.

== Additional accomplishments ==
Lindley won the Snowball Derby in 1984 driving for crew chief and car owner Frankie Grill's GARC race cars team. Grill's son Augie later himself became a two-time winner of the race.

In 2005, Lindley was inducted (posthumously) into the National Motorsports Press Association Hall of Fame. The NMPA ceremony was held in January 2006 in Charlotte, North Carolina.

Achievements
Preceded by L. D. Ottinger	NASCAR Late Model Sportsman Division Champion; 1977	Succeeded by Butch Lindley
Preceded by Butch Lindley	NASCAR Late Model Sportsman Division Champion; 1978	Succeeded by Gene Glover
