= NASCAR O'Reilly Auto Parts Series at North Wilkesboro Speedway =

NASCAR O'Reilly Auto Parts Series race

TBA

NASCAR O'Reilly Auto Parts Series
- Venue: North Wilkesboro Speedway
- Location: North Wilkesboro, North Carolina
- First race: 1983
- Distance: TBA
- Laps: TBA
- Previous names: Holly Farms 399 (1983 I); Coca-Cola 200 (1983 II); Coca-Cola 300 (1984–1985)
- Most wins (driver): Sam Ard (2)
- Most wins (team): Thomas Brothers Racing (2)
- Most wins (manufacturer): Pontiac; Oldsmobile (2)

Circuit information
- Surface: Asphalt
- Length: 0.625 mi (1.006 km)
- Turns: 4

The NASCAR O'Reilly Auto Parts Series at North Wilkesboro Speedway is a NASCAR O'Reilly Auto Parts Series race at North Wilkesboro Speedway planned to be held in May 2027.

== History ==
From 1983 to 1985, the then-NASCAR Busch Series held races as the track. Following the revival of the speedway in 2023, the NASCAR Craftsman Truck Series' FaithFest 250 held a race the day before the NASCAR Cup Series' Window World 450 without an O'Reilly Series race.

On August 12, 2026, it was announced that the NASCAR All-Star Race would return to the track, held alongside the Craftsman Truck Series and O'Reilly Auto Parts Series.

== Past Winners ==
Year	Date	No.	Driver	Team	Manufacturer	Race Distance		Race Time	Average Speed (mph)	Report	Ref
Year	Date	No.	Driver	Team	Manufacturer	Laps	Miles (km)	Race Time	Average Speed (mph)	Report	Ref
1983	April 3	00	Sam Ard	Thomas Brothers Racing	Oldsmobile	200	125.0 (201.17)	N/A	82.69	Report	
1983	September 11	12	Tommy Ellis	Ultra Motorsports	Pontiac	200	125.0 (201.17)	1:21:15	92.308	Report	
1984	September 16	00	Sam Ard	Thomas Brothers Racing	Oldsmobile	150	93.750 (150.88)	0:51:48	108.591	Report	
1985	September 15	11	Jack Ingram	Jack Ingram Racing	Pontiac	150	93.750 (150.88)	1:08:41	81.989	Report	
1986 – 2026	Not held										
2027	May 22									Report	

=== Multiple winners (drivers) ===
# Wins	Driver	Years won
2	Sam Ard	1983 I, 1984

=== Multiple winners (teams) ===
# Wins	Team	Years won
2	Thomas Brothers Racing	1983 I, 1984

=== Manufacturer wins ===
# Wins	Make	Years won
2	Oldsmobile	1983 I, 1984
2	Pontiac	1983 II, 1985

Previous race: BetRivers 200	NASCAR O'Reilly Auto Parts Series; TBA	Next race: Charbroil 300
