= Sterling Marlin =

American racing driver (born 1957)

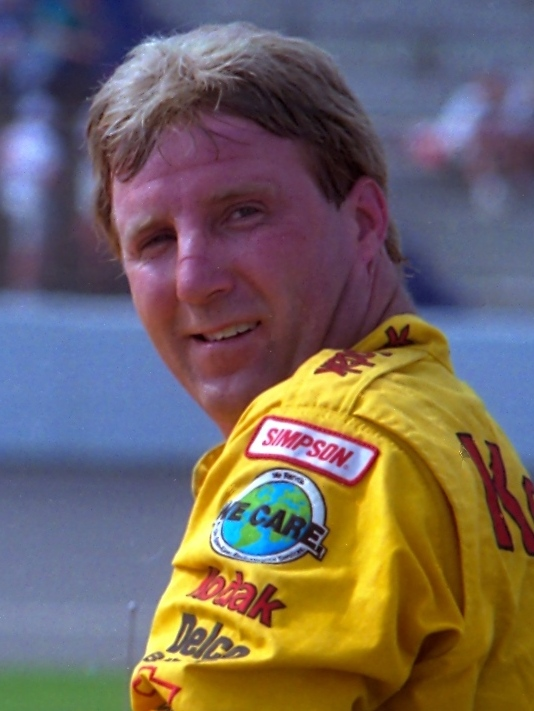
- Marlin in 1996
- Born: Sterling Burton Marlin; June 30, 1957 (age 69); Columbia, Tennessee, U.S.
- Achievements: 1994, 1995 Daytona 500 winner 1996 Winston 500 winner 1980–1982 Nashville Speedway USA Track Champion
- Awards: 1983 Winston Cup Series Rookie of the Year; 1995, 1996 Tennessee Professional Athlete of the Year; 2002 Tennessee Professional Athlete of the Year Nominee; Fairgrounds Speedway Hall of Fame (2009); Named one of NASCAR's 75 Greatest Drivers (2023)

NASCAR Cup Series career
- 748 races run over 33 years
- Best finish: 3rd (1995, 2001)
- First race: 1976 Music City USA 420 (Nashville)
- Last race: 2009 TUMS Fast Relief 500 (Martinsville)
- First win: 1994 Daytona 500 (Daytona)
- Last win: 2002 Carolina Dodge Dealers 400 (Darlington)
Wins	Top tens	Poles
10	216	11

NASCAR O'Reilly Auto Parts Series career
- 77 races run over 17 years
- Best finish: 29th (2005)
- First race: 1986 Winn-Dixie 300 (Charlotte)
- Last race: 2008 Pepsi 300 (Nashville)
- First win: 1990 All Pro 300 (Charlotte)
- Last win: 2000 Cheez-It 250 (Bristol)
Wins	Top tens	Poles
2	22	1

Sterling Burton Marlin (born June 30, 1957) is an American former professional stock car racing driver. He last competed in the JEGS/CRA All-Stars Tour. He formerly competed in the NASCAR Cup Series, winning the Daytona 500 in 1994 and 1995. He is the son of late NASCAR driver Coo Coo Marlin. He is married to Paula and has a daughter, Sutherlin, a son, Steadman, a former NASCAR Busch Series driver, and a grandson Stirlin who races for Sterling in Sterling's No. 114 Super Late Model. Marlin is a member of the NASCAR's 75 Greatest Drivers list.

== NASCAR career ==
=== 1983–1990 ===
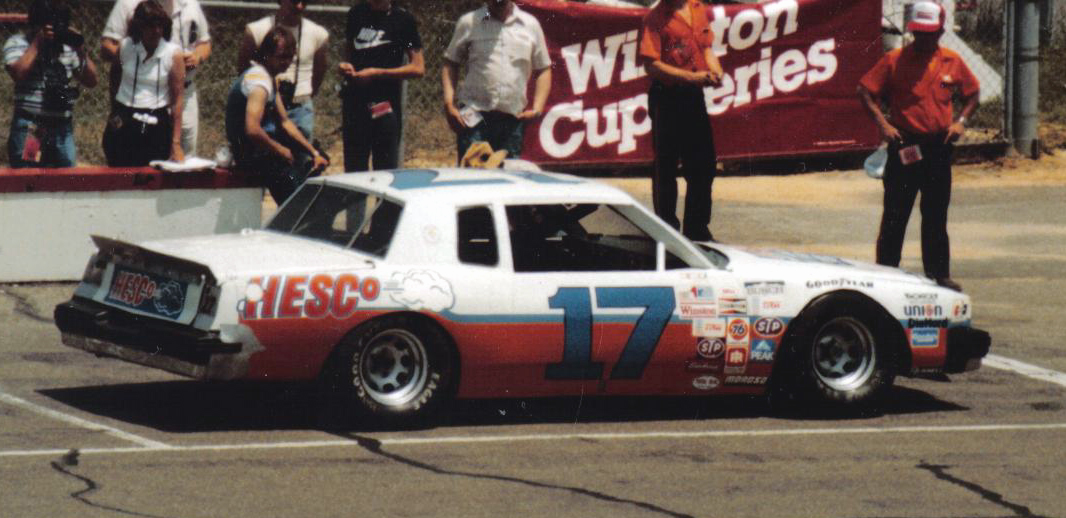
1983 Rookie of the Year

In 1983, Marlin was hired by Roger Hamby to drive his No. 17 Hesco Exhaust Chevrolet. He posted a tenth-place finish at Dover International Speedway and finished nineteenth in the standings, clinching the Rookie of the Year award. Despite finishing fifteenth in the 1984 Daytona 500 for Hamby, Marlin spent most of the season running for Sadler Brothers Racing, posting two top-ten finishes. He also competed in one race for Jimmy Means and Dick Bahre respectively. Marlin only made eight starts in 1985, seven of them coming for Sadler, his best finish being twelfth at Talladega Superspeedway. He ended his season at Charlotte Motor Speedway in the Miller High Life 500, driving the Helen Rae Special. He finished 29th, after suffering flywheel failure.

Marlin moved over to the No. 1 Bull's Eye Barbecue Sauce car owned by Hoss Ellington in 1986. His best finish that season came at the Firecracker 400, where he finished second. Marlin got a full-time ride in 1987, when he was hired by Billy Hagan to drive the No. 44 Piedmont Airlines-sponsored Oldsmobile. He had four top-fives and finished eleventh in points. The following season, he had seven finishes of eighth or better in the first ten races and finished tenth in the standings. Marlin competed in the 1988 NASCAR Christmas 500 at Australia's Calder Park Thunderdome, finishing second to Morgan Shepherd. In 1989, the team received sponsorship from Sunoco and switched to the number 94. He tied a career-best thirteen top-ten finishes but dropped to twelfth in the final standings. He left the team at the end of the 1990 season. During the 1990 season, he won his first career Busch Series race at Charlotte, driving the No. 48 Diamond Ridge Chevrolet owned by Fred Turner.

=== 1991–1997 ===
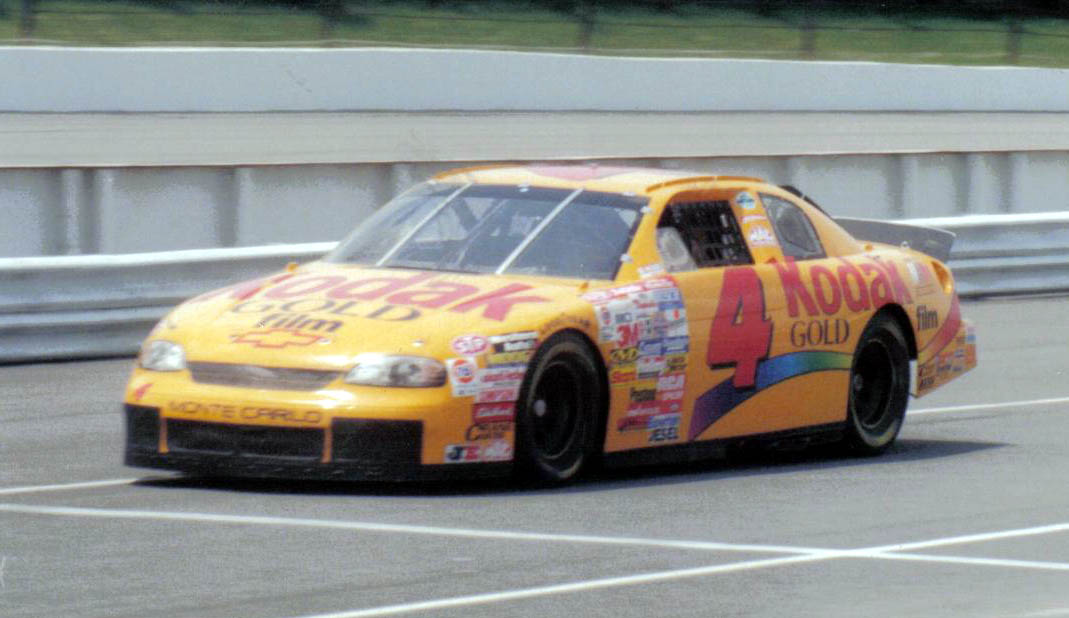
1997 car at Pocono

Marlin signed to drive the No. 22 Maxwell House Ford Thunderbird for Junior Johnson in 1991. He had a second-place finish at Daytona to start the season and won two poles at Talladega Superspeedway and the Firecracker 400, and had a total of seven top-fives and sixteen top tens, finishing seventh in the standings. The next season, he had six top-fives, thirteen top-tens and five poles, finishing tenth in the standings. Marlin departed to drive the No. 8 Raybestos Ford for Stavola Brothers Racing. In 1993, he had just one top-five and eight top-tens and fell to fifteenth in the standings.

Marlin's first career win came in his 279th career start at the 1994 Daytona 500 driving for Morgan-McClure Motorsports in the No. 4 Kodak Chevrolet, the most starts for a driver before his first win before Michael Waltrip's win at the 2001 Daytona 500. In 1994, he had one win, five top-fives and eleven top-tens, and rose slightly to 14th in the standings. He went on to win the 500 again in the following year, becoming only one of five drivers to win consecutive Daytona 500s. The other four men that have accomplished that feat were Richard Petty, Cale Yarborough, Denny Hamlin, and William Byron. He also became the only driver to have his first two career wins at the Daytona 500. Marlin won two more times during the 1995 season (at Darlington and Talladega) for a total of three wins, nine top-fives, 22 top-tens, 472 laps led, an average finish of 9.84, and ranking a career best third in the standings. In 1996, Marlin had two wins, five top-fives, ten top tens, and finished eighth in the standings. In 1997, he scored just two top-fives and six top-tens, and dropped to 25th in the standings, leaving the No. 4 team at year's end.

=== 1998–2006 ===
In 1998, he joined SABCO Racing to drive the No. 40 Coors Light Chevrolet. He opened the season by winning the Gatorade 125, a qualifying race for the Daytona 500 but three weeks later, he failed to qualify for the Primestar 500, the first race he had missed since 1986. He finished in the top-ten six times and had a 13th-place points finish. In 1999, he won his first pole since 1995 at Pocono Raceway, but dropped down to sixteenth in the standings. In 2000, he won his second career Busch Series race, driving SABCO's No. 82 entry at Bristol Motor Speedway. During the season, he lost teammate Kenny Irwin Jr. in a fatal practice crash at New Hampshire International Speedway. After finishing in the top-ten seven times, he fell back to nineteenth in the overall standings.

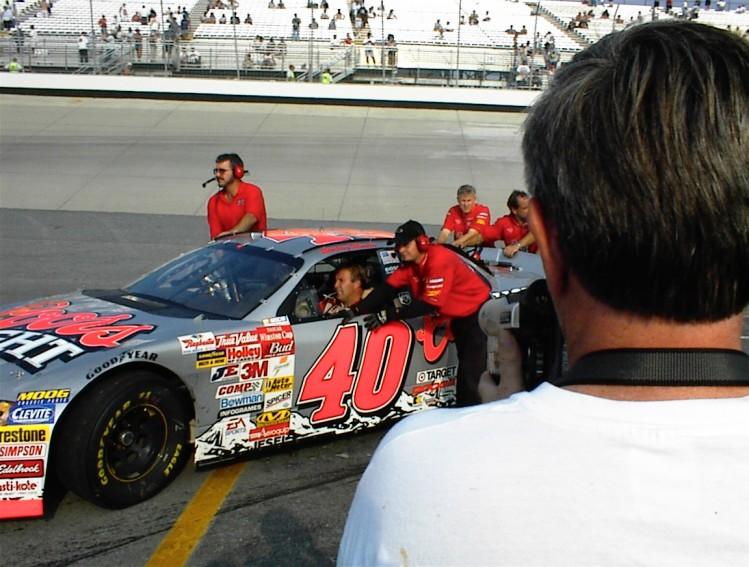
Marlin with Chip Ganassi Racing at Dover Motor Speedway in 2001.

In 2001, SABCO's majority ownership stake was purchased by CART & IndyCar championship owner Chip Ganassi and the team switched to Dodge Intrepids. In his first race with the new team, Marlin won the Gatorade 125 qualifying race at Daytona. Three days later at the Daytona 500, on the final lap, Marlin's car made contact with Dale Earnhardt's rear bumper in turn 4, causing Earnhardt to crash into the turn 4 wall, an impact that would kill him instantly. In the following days after the race, Marlin and his family received hate mail and death threats from angry fans of Earnhardt as well as the sport in general who felt that Marlin was responsible for Earnhardt's death. He was eventually publicly defended by two of Earnhardt's drivers, his son and race winner Michael Waltrip, and was also cleared of any wrongdoing by NASCAR's investigation into the accident. He won Dodge's first race in its return to NASCAR at Michigan International Speedway, as well as winning the UAW-GM Quality 500 at Charlotte. He tied his career best points finish of third that season.

In 2002, Marlin had a strong car at the Daytona 500, and towards the end was battling Jeff Gordon for the lead when they made contact, sending Gordon spinning. NASCAR had then red-flagged the race so it would not finish under caution, and stopped the field momentarily on the backstretch. Concerned about a damaged right front fender, Marlin jumped out of his car and started pulling the fender away from the tire. As working on the car is prohibited during red flag conditions under NASCAR regulations, Marlin was sent to the tail end of the field for the restart. Marlin would finish in eighth.

The following week, Marlin finished second in Rockingham to Matt Kenseth. Marlin took the points lead and did not let it go for the following 24 weeks. For most of that time he held a comfortable lead, which reached triple digits several times. Marlin followed this second-place finish with a win at the UAW-DaimlerChrysler 400 at Las Vegas Motor Speedway, but not without controversy: During the race, Marlin spun while making late race pit stop, causing him to break the pit road speed limit. NASCAR's penalty for being too fast entering pit road was to hold the car in its pit stall for an additional fifteen seconds, but the official at Marlin's pit stall was not informed of the penalty until after the crew had released the car. NASCAR determined that they had no precedent for forcing Marlin to return to the pits as his early release was their mistake (and they could not order him to return for a stop and go penalty). Following the incident, NASCAR changed the rule so that all speeding violations are enforced with a drive through penalty (forcing the driver to travel the length of pit road at the speed limit).

After this win, Marlin finished ninth the following week at Atlanta. The week after that, he won the Carolina Dodge Dealers 400 at Darlington Raceway, which would be the final win of his Cup career.

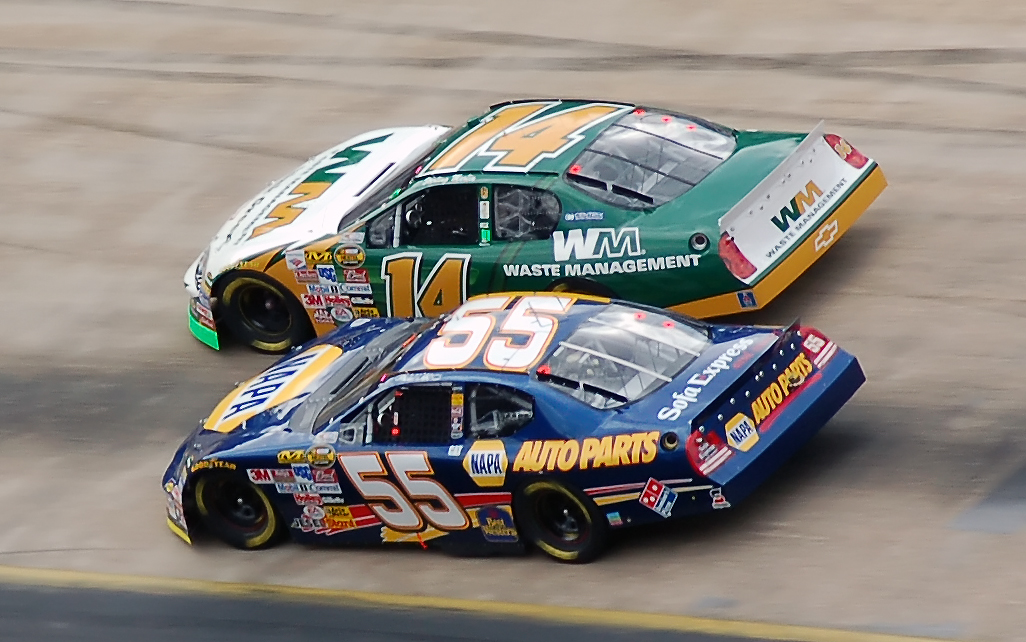
No. 14 Marlin battles No. 55 Michael Waltrip at the 2006 spring Bristol race.

With a series of strong finishes (seventh at Texas, fifth at Talladega, seventh at California, fourth in June at Pocono, third at Daytona, third at the second Pocono race, sixth at Michigan in August, seventh at Bristol, and fourth at Darlington in the fall), Marlin was still 91 points ahead of second place entering the Chevy Monte Carlo 400 in September. However, Marlin finished that race in last place after an early accident and saw his points lead all but evaporate as Mark Martin, who had entered the race 125 points behind Marlin, gained 116 points and moved into second place in the points as Marlin's lead shrunk to nine points (Jeff Gordon, who had leapfrogged Martin for second place in the standings with a win the week before, also gained on Marlin but dropped to fourth due to the strong finishes from both Martin and Jimmie Johnson, who gained 95 points on Marlin to move into third). At the New Hampshire 300 the next week Marlin lost the points lead as Martin finished four places ahead of him, gaining fifteen points. The next week, Marlin dropped to fourth in the standings after a 21st-place finish at Dover.

One week later, at the Protection One 400 at Kansas, Marlin had a hard crash after 147 laps and finished 33rd. He was diagnosed with a cracked vertebra in his neck and would be forced to miss the remaining seven races. Marlin was replaced by Busch Series driver Jamie McMurray, who had recently been signed by Chip Ganassi Racing to drive for the team in the 2003 season. McMurray won the UAW-GM Quality 500 in his second start with Marlin's car, and Marlin telephoned McMurray during the post-race festivities to congratulate him. Marlin ultimately finished 18th in the final season points with eight top-fives and ten top-tens. Marlin's injury was the beginning of a struggle for Chip Ganassi Racing to win races on a regular basis - a slump that would last from 2002 towards 2010.

Marlin did not finish in the top-five in 2003, but had eleven top-ten finishes and matched his previous year's finish of eighteenth in points. He did however come close to a win at the 2003 Sharpie 500 at his hometown in Bristol Tennessee. Marlin controlled the race early and mid-way and appeared to have victory in his hands until he was wrecked by Kurt Busch with less than 150 laps to go. Kurt Busch went on to win the race but apologized in victory lane. Marlin however was not pleased with Busch in post-race ceremonies, stating "What a bone-headed move. I guess Spencer didn't punch him hard enough.", as a reference to Busch and Jimmy Spencer's altercation the previous week. Busch would later say in a post-race interview, and later in a 2020 podcast with Dale Earnhardt Jr. that he offered to buy Marlin a six-pack of Coors as a peace offering, but was turned down.

Despite three top-fives in 2004, Marlin fell to 21st in points. During the 2005 season, Ganassi announced Marlin would be replaced by David Stremme for the 2006 season in order to attract the younger male demographic. It was also said that Richard Childress Racing had offered Marlin a deal to drive the No. 07 Jack Daniels Chevrolet, However, Marlin honored his contract with Ganassi and finished out the 2005 season. He did however miss one race-the 2005 Sirius at the Glen to attend the funeral of his father Coo Coo Marlin who died of lung cancer one day before the race. Road ringer Scott Pruett replaced Sterling in the No. 40 and finished fourth in the race.

Marlin reached as high as sixth in the points standings, but would later fall to thirtieth in the final standings.

Marlin joined MB2 Motorsports for 2006 to drive the Waste Management Chevy, running with the No. 14 in tribute to his father, Coo Coo Marlin, who died during the 2005 season. Marlin's only top-ten finish in 2006 was ninth place at Richmond. His 2006 season was shadowed by bad luck and No. 14 finished 36th in owner points.

=== 2007–2010 ===
Marlin was able to qualify via speed for each of the first five races of the 2007 season, his Pep Boys No. 14 team was the only team out of the top-35 from 2006 to do this. Marlin's run in the No. 14 ended on July 17, 2007, when Ginn Racing announced Regan Smith, who had been splitting time with Mark Martin in Ginn's U.S. Army-sponsored No. 01 car, would replace him beginning at the Allstate 400 at the Brickyard at Indianapolis. He attempted to qualify for two races in 2007, but he failed to qualify for either. He tried to make the Sharpie 500 at Bristol in the No. 78 car as a replacement for Kenny Wallace, and the UAW-Ford 500 at Talladega, replacing Mike Wallace in the No. 09 car. However, in November he managed to qualify the No. 09 and drove at Phoenix for a 25th place finish, and a week later at Homestead finishing 33rd.

Marlin failed to qualify for the 2008 Daytona 500 in the No. 09 car, but qualified at Talladega and the following week at Richmond as well. For Darlington, Marlin raced in his old No. 40 car and qualified 14th, and also at the Coca-Cola 600 at Lowe's Motor Speedway in the No. 40, still in for the injured Dario Franchitti. He finished out the rest of the season driving for Phoenix Racing. In March 2009, Marlin participated in and won the Saturday Night Special, a charity event at Bristol Motor Speedway which included NASCAR Legends. He led the entire event in a car painted similar to the one he drove with Morgan McClure Motorsports, and wearing an older-style Coors Light uniform from his days while driving for Chip Ganassi.

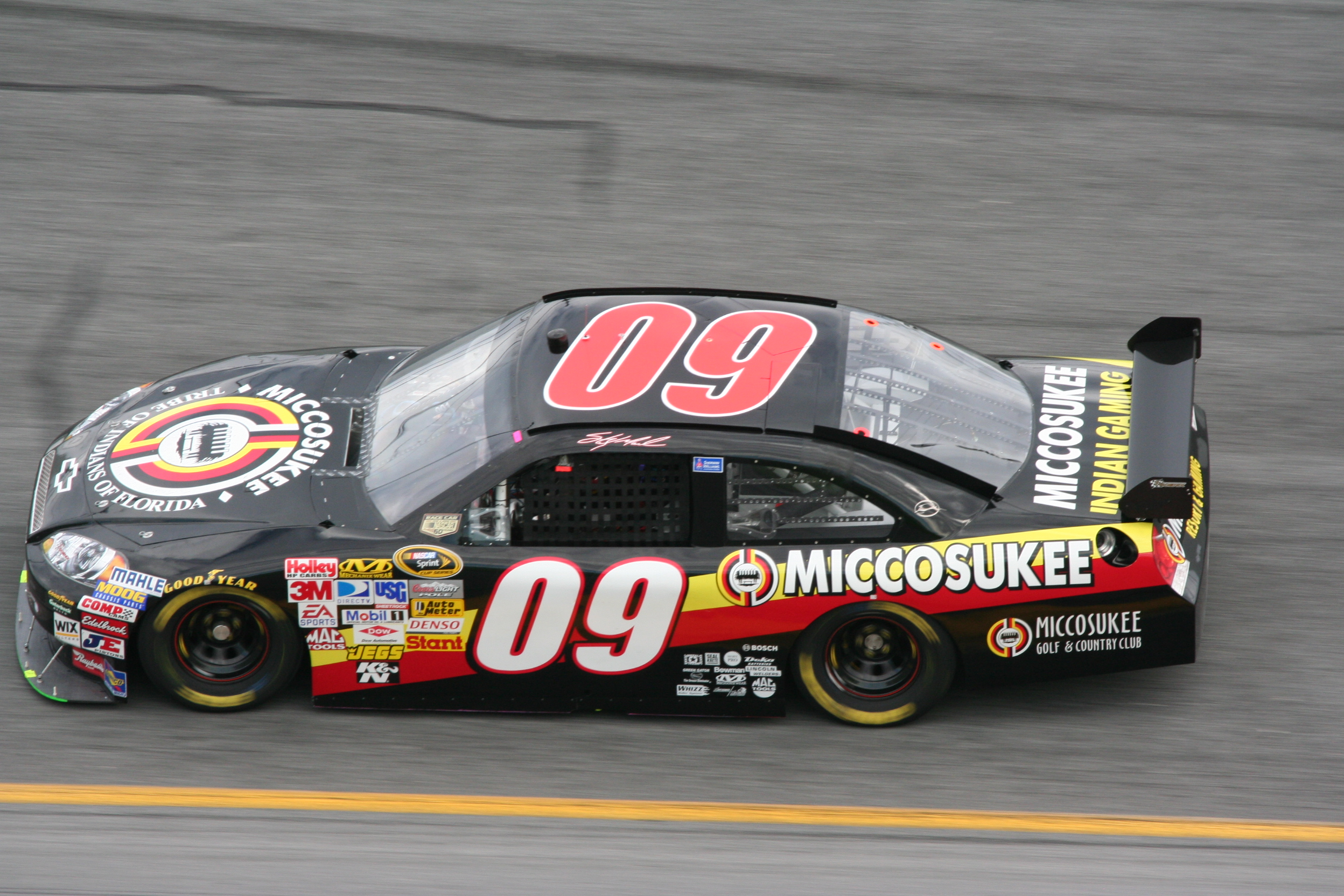
No. 09 Cup racecar in 2008

For the 2009 NASCAR Sprint Cup Series, Marlin continued to run a limited schedule in the No. 09 Phoenix Racing Miccosukee Resort & Gaming Chevrolet. His best finish for the 2009 season was 35th at Martinsville, which also proved the last of his 748 career starts.

An announcement was made preceding the Cup Series finale weekend at Homestead-Miami Speedway that Marlin would attempt the race in the No. 70 Chevrolet for TRG Motorsports, though Marlin later denied it.

== Post-racing career ==
Marlin announced his retirement from racing on March 18, 2010, and formerly owned a Chevrolet dealership in Ashland City, Tennessee and a Chrysler, Dodge, and Jeep dealership in Dickson, Tennessee. In 2012, Marlin publicly revealed that he had been diagnosed with Parkinsonism. He has undergone deep brain stimulation surgical procedures at Vanderbilt University Medical Center as part of his treatment.

In late 2011, Marlin helped form Tennessee Racing Association, LLC, along with several other drivers (including Chad Chaffin and Mike Alexander) and businessmen, in an effort to preserve Fairgrounds Speedway and allow the track to remain active in the racing community. He is fully retired from NASCAR competition, as well as the Pro Late Model Division at Fairgrounds Speedway. Marlin lives on a ranch near Spring Hill, Tennessee.

== Personal life ==
Marlin attended Spring Hill High School, where he played quarterback for the high school football team. A five-mile stretch of U.S. Route 31 in Tennessee, from the school to Carters Creek Pike, was renamed the "Sterling Marlin Commemorative Highway" in his honor in 2026.

In 2003, game show Family Feud hosted a NASCAR special with help from then-Family Feud host Richard Karn. Marlin was one of the drivers who appeared in an episode, along with some crew members from the Coors team. Marlin played against fellow driver Elliott Sadler and the No. 38 Robert Yates team, winning the game.

== Motorsports career results ==
=== NASCAR ===
(key) (Bold – Pole position awarded by qualifying time. Italics – Pole position earned by points standings or practice time. * – Most laps led.)

==== Sprint Cup Series ====
NASCAR Sprint Cup Series results
Year	Team	No.	Make	1	2	3	4	5	6	7	8	9	10	11	12	13	14	15	16	17	18	19	20	21	22	23	24	25	26	27	28	29	30	31	32	33	34	35	36	NSCC	Pts	Ref
1976	Cunningham-Kelley Racing	14	Chevy	RSD	DAY	CAR	RCH	BRI	ATL	NWS	DAR	MAR	TAL	NSV; 29	DOV	CLT	RSD	MCH	DAY	NSV	POC	TAL	MCH	BRI	DAR	RCH	DOV	MAR	NWS	CLT	CAR	ATL	ONT							101st	76	
1978	Cunningham-Kelley Racing	14	Chevy	RSD	DAY	RCH	CAR	ATL	BRI	DAR	NWS	MAR	TAL	DOV	CLT; 9	NSV	RSD	MCH	DAY	NSV; 25	POC	TAL	MCH	BRI	DAR	RCH	DOV	MAR	NWS	CLT	CAR	ATL	ONT							69th	226	
1979	Cunningham-Kelley Racing	14	Chevy	RSD	DAY	CAR	RCH	ATL	NWS	BRI	DAR	MAR	TAL	NSV	DOV	CLT	TWS	RSD	MCH	DAY	NSV; 15	POC	TAL	MCH	BRI	DAR	RCH	DOV	MAR	CLT	NWS	CAR	ATL	ONT						86th	123	
1980	Cunningham-Kelley Racing	14	Chevy	RSD	DAY; 8																										CLT; 36	CAR	ATL	ONT						49th	387	
1980	Jim Stacy Racing	5	Olds		DAY; DNQ	RCH	CAR	ATL	BRI	DAR; 11	NWS	MAR	TAL	NSV	DOV	CLT; 16	TWS	RSD	MCH	DAY																				49th	387	
1980	Ulrich Racing	40	Chevy																		NSV; 7	POC	TAL	MCH	BRI	DAR	RCH	DOV	NWS	MAR										49th	387	
1981	Ulrich Racing	99	Buick	RSD	DAY	RCH	CAR	ATL	BRI	NWS	DAR	MAR	TAL	NSV	DOV	CLT	TWS	RSD	MCH	DAY	NSV; 26	POC	TAL	MCH	BRI	DAR	RCH	DOV	MAR	NWS										93rd		
1981	Marlin Racing	14	Chevy																												CLT; 28	CAR	ATL	RSD						93rd		
1982	Billy Matthews Racing	41	Olds	DAY; DNQ	RCH	BRI	ATL	CAR	DAR	NWS	MAR	TAL	NSV	DOV	CLT	POC	RSD	MCH	DAY	NSV	POC	TAL	MCH	BRI	DAR	RCH	DOV	NWS	CLT; 23	MAR	CAR	ATL	RSD							NA	0	
1983	Hamby Racing	17	Chevy	DAY; 34			ATL; 31	DAR; 11			TAL; 41				CLT; 19				DAY; 16			TAL; 21	MCH; 29							CLT; 40		ATL; 16								19th	2980	
1983	Hamby Racing	17	Pontiac		RCH; 18	CAR; 13			NWS; 22	MAR; 12		NSV; 11	DOV; 10	BRI; 18		RSD; 25	POC; 29	MCH; 20		NSV; 15	POC; 18			BRI; 15	DAR; 24	RCH; 26	DOV; 27	MAR; 27	NWS; 17		CAR; 15		RSD; 17							19th	2980	
1984	Hamby Racing	10	Chevy	DAY; 15	RCH																																			37th	1207	
1984	Bahre Racing	23	Buick			CAR; 35	ATL	BRI	NWS	DAR	MAR																													37th	1207	
1984	Sadler Brothers Racing	95	Chevy									TAL; 12	NSV; 18	DOV	CLT; 29	RSD	POC; 33	MCH	DAY; 33			TAL; 32	MCH; 32		DAR; 39	RCH	DOV	MAR	CLT; 35	NWS	CAR	ATL; 9	RSD							37th	1207	
1984	Jimmy Means Racing	52	Pontiac																	NSV; 30	POC																			37th	1207	
1984	Sadler Brothers Racing	95	Olds																					BRI; 8																37th	1207	
1985	Sadler Brothers Racing	95	Chevy	DAY; 16	RCH	CAR	ATL; 25	BRI; 22	DAR	NWS	MAR	TAL; 25	DOV	CLT; 34	RSD	POC	MCH	DAY; 33	POC	TAL; 12	MCH	BRI	DAR	RCH	DOV	MAR	NWS													37th	645	
1985	Helen Rae Motorsports	00	Chevy																									CLT; 29	CAR	ATL	RSD									37th	645	
1986	Ellington Racing	1	Chevy	DAY; 9	RCH	CAR	ATL; 32	BRI	DAR; 33	NWS	MAR	TAL; 39	DOV	CLT; 7	RSD	POC	MCH	DAY; 2	POC	TAL; 4	GLN	MCH	BRI	DAR; 37	RCH	DOV	MAR	NWS	CLT; 33	CAR	ATL; 32	RSD								36th	989	
1987	Hagan Racing	44	Olds	DAY; 30	CAR; 19	RCH; 21	ATL; 13	DAR; 4	NWS; 17	BRI; 24	MAR; 19	TAL; 14	CLT; 32	DOV; 10	POC; 15	RSD; 9	MCH; 18	DAY; 16	POC; 25	TAL; 14	GLN; 32	MCH; 15	BRI; 20	DAR; 4	RCH; 22	DOV; 5	MAR; 7	NWS; 20	CLT; 3	CAR; 11	RSD; 24	ATL; 9								11th	3381	
1988	Hagan Racing	44	Olds	DAY; 8	RCH; 5	CAR; 3	ATL; 20	DAR; 5	BRI; 8	NWS; 16	MAR; 2	TAL; 6	CLT; 27	DOV; 11	RSD; 9	POC; 28	MCH; 37	DAY; 34	POC; 14	TAL; 6	GLN; 8	MCH; 11	BRI; 12	DAR; 5	RCH; 16	DOV; 23	MAR; 26	CLT; 5	NWS; 14	CAR; 34	PHO; 10	ATL; 12								10th	3621	
1989	Hagan Racing	94	Olds	DAY; 11	CAR; 7	ATL; 5	RCH; 8	DAR; 5	BRI; 15	NWS; 26	MAR; 8	TAL; 14	CLT; 2	DOV; 26	SON; 40	POC; 6	MCH; 8	DAY; 7	POC; 36	TAL; 28	GLN; 7	MCH; 34	BRI; 18	DAR; 10	RCH; 28	DOV; 17	MAR; 20	CLT; 7	NWS; 19	CAR; 23	PHO; 30	ATL; 3								12th	3422	
1990	Hagan Racing	94	Olds	DAY; 19	RCH; 13	CAR; 4	ATL; 10	DAR; 28	BRI; 7	NWS; 31	MAR; 32	TAL; 26	CLT; 35	DOV; 5	SON; 6	POC; 9	MCH; 18	DAY; 5	POC; 30	TAL; 3	GLN; 15	MCH; 20	BRI; 5	DAR; 18	RCH; 24	DOV; 12	MAR; 12	NWS; 13	CLT; 16	CAR; 6	PHO; 16	ATL; 38								14th	3387	
1991	Junior Johnson & Associates	22	Ford	DAY; 2	RCH; 9	CAR; 33	ATL; 7	DAR; 10	BRI; 27	NWS; 22	MAR; 28	TAL; 4	CLT; 11	DOV; 15	SON; 26	POC; 8	MCH; 13	**DAY**; 8	POC; 5	**TAL**; 5	GLN; 12	MCH; 12	BRI; 2	DAR; 6	RCH; 10	DOV; 17	MAR; 14	NWS; 13	CLT; 5	CAR; 8	PHO; 3	ATL; 7								7th	3839	
1992	Junior Johnson & Associates	22	Ford	**DAY**; 35	CAR; 15	RCH; 7	ATL; 17	**DAR**; 22	BRI; 32	NWS; 8	MAR; 2	TAL; 4	CLT; 22	DOV; 14	SON; 16	POC; 7	MCH; 32	**DAY**; 2	POC; 11	**TAL**; 2	GLN; 16	MCH; 7	BRI; 15	**DAR**; 28	RCH; 21	DOV; 33	MAR; 7	NWS; 5	CLT; 16	CAR; 5	PHO; 9	ATL; 7								10th	3603	
1993	Stavola Brothers Racing	8	Ford	DAY; 9	CAR; 28	RCH; 31	ATL; 12	DAR; 21	BRI; 20	NWS; 9*	MAR; 21	TAL; 24	SON; 12	CLT; 24	DOV; 33	POC; 8	MCH; 8	DAY; 2	NHA; 6*	POC; 7	TAL; 27	GLN; 6	MCH; 17	BRI; 23	DAR; 31	RCH; 24	DOV; 11	MAR; 30	NWS; 19	CLT; 17	CAR; 12	PHO; 30	ATL; 17							15th	3355	
1994	Morgan-McClure Motorsports	4	Chevy	DAY; 1	CAR; 2	RCH; 19	ATL; 25	DAR; 34	BRI; 8	NWS; 17	MAR; 27	TAL; 8	SON; 29	CLT; 15	DOV; 8	POC; 38	MCH; 34	DAY; 28	NHA; 10	POC; 12	TAL; 5	IND; 14	GLN; 26	MCH; 34	BRI; 6	DAR; 5	RCH; 13	DOV; 30	MAR; 7	NWS; 31	CLT; 36	CAR; 14	**PHO**; 3	ATL; 40						14th	3443	
1995	Morgan-McClure Motorsports	4	Chevy	DAY; 1*	CAR; 12	RCH; 5	ATL; 7	DAR; 1	BRI; 9	NWS; 7	MAR; 13	TAL; 39	SON; 7	CLT; 4	DOV; 7	POC; 4	MCH; 7	DAY; 2*	NHA; 9	POC; 18	**TAL**; 1	IND; 7	GLN; 21	MCH; 4	BRI; 7	DAR; 10	RCH; 33	DOV; 6	MAR; 23	NWS; 15	CLT; 6	CAR; 6	PHO; 12	ATL; 2						3rd	4361	
1996	Morgan-McClure Motorsports	4	Chevy	DAY; 40	CAR; 6	RCH; 11	ATL; 13	DAR; 11	BRI; 18	NWS; 5	MAR; 10	TAL; 1*	SON; 15	CLT; 6	DOV; 41	POC; 11	MCH; 3*	DAY; 1*	NHA; 29	POC; 6	TAL; 29	IND; 39	GLN; 11	MCH; 33	BRI; 18	DAR; 8	RCH; 21	DOV; 17	MAR; 31	NWS; 11	CLT; 4	CAR; 13	PHO; 27	ATL; 15						8th	3682	
1997	Morgan-McClure Motorsports	4	Chevy	DAY; 5	CAR; 20	RCH; 19	ATL; 23	DAR; 32	TEX; 8	BRI; 20	MAR; 21	SON; 26	TAL; 39	CLT; 40	DOV; 10	POC; 15	MCH; 17	CAL; 36	DAY; 3	NHA; 22	POC; 20	IND; 43	GLN; 13	MCH; 43	BRI; 10	DAR; 40	RCH; 39	NHA; 39	DOV; 27	MAR; 39	CLT; 20	TAL; 38	CAR; 9	PHO; 27	ATL; 11					25th	2954	
1998	Team SABCO	40	Chevy	DAY; 22	CAR; 25	LVS; 24	ATL; DNQ	DAR; 14	BRI; 40	TEX; 14	MAR; 36	TAL; 9	CAL; 14	CLT; 15	DOV; 19	RCH; 10	MCH; 18	POC; 9	SON; 7	NHA; 35	POC; 11	IND; 11	GLN; 7	MCH; 15	BRI; 21	NHA; 17	DAR; 8	RCH; 15	DOV; 16	MAR; 18*	CLT; 30	TAL; 14	DAY; 18	PHO; 12	CAR; 13	ATL; 42				13th	3530	
1999	Team SABCO	40	Chevy	DAY; 32	CAR; 37	LVS; 15	ATL; 18	DAR; 16	TEX; 9	BRI; 14	MAR; 13	TAL; 25	CAL; 16	RCH; 18	CLT; 40	DOV; 29	MCH; 22	**POC**; 4	SON; 25	DAY; 12	NHA; 34	POC; 28	IND; 16	GLN; 33	MCH; 15	BRI; 7	DAR; 40	RCH; 4	NHA; 21	DOV; 38	MAR; 11	CLT; 29	TAL; 22	CAR; 8	PHO; 40	HOM; 17	ATL; 31			16th	3397	
2000	Team SABCO	40	Chevy	DAY; 24	CAR; 15	LVS; 18	ATL; 12	DAR; 21	BRI; 10	TEX; 34	MAR; 24	TAL; 8	CAL; 32	RCH; 29	CLT; 19	DOV; 31	MCH; 10	POC; 22	SON; 2	DAY; 25	NHA; 25	POC; 42	IND; 30	GLN; 30	MCH; 15	BRI; 8	DAR; 17	RCH; 20	NHA; 22	DOV; 37	MAR; 9	CLT; 31	TAL; 41	CAR; 33	PHO; 15	HOM; 26	ATL; 8			19th	3363	
2001	Chip Ganassi Racing	40	Dodge	DAY; 7	CAR; 8	LVS; 3	ATL; 35	DAR; 5	BRI; 12	TEX; 34	MAR; 5	TAL; 23*	CAL; 9	RCH; 11	CLT; 15	DOV; 6	MCH; 3	POC; 4	SON; 28	**DAY**; 39	CHI; 9	NHA; 17	POC; 16	IND; 2	GLN; 25	MCH; 1	BRI; 9	DAR; 16	RCH; 32	DOV; 8	KAN; 5	CLT; 1*	MAR; 10	TAL; 17	PHO; 34	CAR; 11	HOM; 5	ATL; 2	NHA; 2	3rd	4741	
2002	Chip Ganassi Racing	40	Dodge	DAY; 8*	CAR; 2	LVS; 1	ATL; 9	DAR; 1	BRI; 19	TEX; 7	MAR; 12	TAL; 5	CAL; 7	RCH; 11	CLT; 11	DOV; 13	POC; 4	MCH; 21	SON; 43	DAY; 3	CHI; 16	NHA; 14	POC; 3*	IND; 27	GLN; 30	MCH; 6	BRI; 7	DAR; 4	RCH; 43	NHA; 21	DOV; 21	KAN; 33	TAL	CLT	MAR	ATL	CAR	PHO	HOM	18th	3703	
2003	Chip Ganassi Racing	40	Dodge	DAY; 17	CAR; 40	LVS; 8	ATL; 14	DAR; 39	BRI; 6	TEX; 29	TAL; 6	MAR; 7	CAL; 10	RCH; 13	CLT; 7	DOV; 35	POC; 6*	MCH; 6*	SON; 18	DAY; 19	CHI; 21	NHA; 39	POC; 10	IND; 34	GLN; 43	MCH; 19	BRI; 17	DAR; 31	RCH; 22	NHA; 29	DOV; 13	TAL; 39	KAN; 34	CLT; 15	MAR; 43	ATL; 16	PHO; 11	CAR; 10	HOM; 10	18th	3745	
2004	Chip Ganassi Racing	40	Dodge	DAY; 37	CAR; 4	LVS; 18	ATL; 16	DAR; 14	BRI; 4	TEX; 26	MAR; 9	TAL; 31	CAL; 27	RCH; 15	CLT; 39	DOV; 29	POC; 31	MCH; 6	SON; 21	DAY; 20	CHI; 7	NHA; 21	POC; 15	IND; 33	GLN; 36	MCH; 15	BRI; 6	CAL; 26	RCH; 14	NHA; 12	DOV; 15	TAL; 34	KAN; 34	CLT; 12	MAR; 4	ATL; 19	PHO; 25	DAR; 12	HOM; 16	21st	3857	
2005	Chip Ganassi Racing	40	Dodge	DAY; 8	CAL; 15	LVS; 35	ATL; 16	BRI; 11	MAR; 6	TEX; 5	PHO; 26	TAL; 34	DAR; 41	RCH; 23	CLT; 39	DOV; 32	POC; 16	MCH; 40	SON; 26	DAY; 22	CHI; 32	NHA; 34	POC; 28	IND; 9	GLN	MCH; 21	BRI; 29	CAL; 19	RCH; 41	NHA; 11	DOV; 41	TAL; 7	KAN; 13	CLT; 40	MAR; 38	ATL; 20	TEX; 23	PHO; 34	HOM; 26	30th	3183	
2006	MB2 Motorsports	14	Chevy	DAY; 34	CAL; 32	LVS; 36	ATL; 34	BRI; 17	MAR; 14	TEX; 30	PHO; 12	TAL; 37	RCH; 9	DAR; 28	CLT; 28	DOV; 31	POC; 42	MCH; 24	SON; 42	DAY; 24	CHI; 26	NHA; 16	POC; 30	IND; 31	GLN; 39	MCH; 29	BRI; 32	CAL; 29	RCH; 30	NHA; 25	DOV; 31	KAN; 20	TAL; 40	CLT; 11	MAR; 21	ATL; 20	TEX; 40	PHO; 36	HOM; 37	34th	2854	
2007	Ginn Racing	14	Chevy	DAY; 17	CAL; 35	LVS; 34	ATL; 24	BRI; 30	MAR; 21	TEX; 34	PHO; 27	TAL; 16	RCH; 23	DAR; 13	CLT; 33	DOV; 16	POC; 31	MCH; 20	SON; 43	NHA; 24	DAY; 40	CHI; 23	IND	POC	GLN	MCH														40th	1752	
2007	Furniture Row Racing	78	Chevy																								BRI; DNQ	CAL	RCH	NHA	DOV	KAN								40th	1752	
2007	Phoenix Racing	09	Chevy																														TAL; DNQ	CLT	MAR	ATL	TEX	PHO; 25	HOM; 33	40th	1752	
2008	Phoenix Racing	09	Chevy	DAY; DNQ	CAL	LVS	ATL	BRI	MAR	TEX	PHO	TAL; 22	RCH; 25								DAY; 41	CHI	IND	POC	GLN	MCH	BRI; 43	CAL	RCH; DNQ	NHA	DOV	KAN	TAL; 42	CLT	MAR; DNQ	ATL	TEX	PHO; 32	HOM; 29	51st	482	
2008	Chip Ganassi Racing	40	Dodge											DAR; 34	CLT; 31	DOV	POC	MCH	SON	NHA																				51st	482	
2009	Phoenix Racing	09	Dodge	DAY	CAL; DNQ	LVS; DNQ	ATL	BRI; 40	MAR; DNQ	TEX	PHO; 40	TAL	RCH	DAR; 42	CLT	DOV	POC; 39	MCH; 41	SON	NHA	DAY	CHI	IND; DNQ	POC; 38	GLN	MCH	BRI	ATL	RCH	NHA	DOV	KAN	CAL	CLT; DNQ	MAR; 35	TAL	TEX	PHO	HOM	53rd	316	

===== Daytona 500 =====
Year	Team	Manufacturer	Start	Finish
1980	Jim Stacy Racing	Oldsmobile	DNQ	
1980	Cunningham-Kelley Racing	Chevrolet	36	8
1982	Billy Matthews Racing	Oldsmobile	DNQ	
1983	Hamby Racing	Chevrolet	33	34
1984	Hamby Racing	Chevrolet	40	15
1985	Sadler Brothers Racing	Chevrolet	20	16
1986	Ellington Racing	Chevrolet	8	9
1987	Hagan Racing	Oldsmobile	10	30
1988	Hagan Racing	Oldsmobile	12	8
1989	Hagan Racing	Oldsmobile	6	11
1990	Hagan Racing	Oldsmobile	21	19
1991	Junior Johnson & Associates	Ford	12	2
1992	Junior Johnson & Associates	Ford	**1**	35
1993	Stavola Brothers Racing	Ford	14	9
1994	Morgan-McClure Motorsports	Chevrolet	4	**1**
1995	Morgan-McClure Motorsports	Chevrolet	3	**1**
1996	Morgan-McClure Motorsports	Chevrolet	3	40
1997	Morgan-McClure Motorsports	Chevrolet	9	5
1998	Team SABCO	Chevrolet	3	22
1999	Team SABCO	Chevrolet	17	32
2000	Team SABCO	Chevrolet	38	24
2001	Chip Ganassi Racing	Dodge	3	7
2002	Chip Ganassi Racing	Dodge	13	8
2003	Chip Ganassi Racing	Dodge	7	17
2004	Chip Ganassi Racing	Dodge	4	37
2005	Chip Ganassi Racing	Dodge	18	8
2006	MB2 Motorsports	Chevrolet	39	34
2007	Ginn Racing	Chevrolet	38	17
2008	Phoenix Racing	Chevrolet	DNQ	

==== Nationwide Series ====
NASCAR Nationwide Series results
Year	Team	No.	Make	1	2	3	4	5	6	7	8	9	10	11	12	13	14	15	16	17	18	19	20	21	22	23	24	25	26	27	28	29	30	31	32	33	34	35	NNSC	Pts	Ref
1986	Hagan Racing	69	Olds	DAY	CAR	HCY	MAR	BRI	DAR	SBO	LGY	JFC	DOV	CLT; 29	SBO	HCY	ROU	IRP	SBO	RAL	OXF	SBO	HCY	LGY	ROU	BRI	DAR	RCH	DOV	MAR	ROU	CLT	CAR	MAR					133rd	-	
1988	Hagan Racing	44	Olds	DAY	HCY	CAR	MAR	DAR	BRI	LNG	NZH	SBO	NSV; 23	CLT; 11	DOV	ROU	LAN	LVL	MYB	OXF	SBO	HCY	LNG	IRP	ROU	BRI	DAR	RCH; 14	DOV	MAR	CLT; 21	CAR	MAR						46th	445	
1989	Hagan Racing	48	Olds	DAY	CAR	MAR	HCY	DAR	BRI	NZH	SBO	LAN	NSV	CLT	DOV	ROU	LVL	VOL	MYB	SBO	HCY	DUB	IRP	ROU	BRI	DAR; 39	RCH	DOV	MAR	CLT; 25	CAR	MAR							77th	134	
1990	Fred Turner Racing	48	Olds	DAY; 24	RCH	CAR	MAR	HCY	DAR	BRI	LAN	SBO	NZH	HCY	CLT; 4	DOV	ROU	VOL	MYB	OXF	NHA	SBO	DUB	IRP	ROU	BRI	DAR; 12	RCH	DOV; 32	MAR	CLT; 1*	NHA	CAR	MAR					48th	625	
1992	Fred Turner Racing	10	Chevy	DAY; 39	CAR	RCH	ATL	MAR	DAR	BRI	HCY	LAN	DUB	NZH	CLT; 4	DOV	ROU	MYB	GLN	VOL	NHA	TAL	IRP	ROU	MCH	NHA	BRI	DAR	RCH	DOV	CLT	MAR	CAR	HCY					73rd	206	
1993	Fred Turner Racing	48	Ford	DAY; 28	CAR	RCH	DAR	BRI	HCY	ROU	MAR	NZH	CLT; 42	DOV	MYB	GLN	MLW	TAL; 8	IRP	MCH; 11	NHA	BRI	DAR; 22	RCH; 23	DOV	ROU	CLT; 11	MAR	CAR	HCY									41st	864	
1993	Fred Turner Racing	70	Ford																												ATL; 5								41st	864	
1994	Fred Turner Racing	4	Chevy	DAY; 6	CAR	RCH	ATL; QL^{†}	MAR	DAR; 41	HCY	BRI	ROU	NHA	NZH	CLT; 40	DOV	MYB	GLN; 36	MLW; 39	SBO	TAL; 4*	HCY	IRP	MCH; 18	BRI	DAR	RCH; 34	DOV	CLT; 7	MAR	CAR								44th	810	
1995	Fred Turner Racing	22	Chevy	DAY	CAR	RCH	ATL	NSV; 36	DAR	BRI	HCY	NHA	NZH	CLT	DOV	MYB	GLN	MLW	TAL	SBO	IRP	MCH	BRI	DAR	RCH	DOV	CLT	CAR	HOM										106th	55	
1996	Fred Turner Racing	22	Pontiac	DAY	CAR	RCH	ATL	**NSV**; 22	DAR	BRI	HCY	NZH	CLT	DOV	SBO	MYB	GLN	MLW	NHA	TAL	IRP	MCH	BRI	DAR	RCH	DOV													60th	262	
1996	Martin Racing	92	Chevy																								CLT; 3	CAR	HOM										60th	262	
1997	Martin Racing	92	Chevy	DAY	CAR	RCH	ATL	LVS	DAR	HCY	TEX	BRI	NSV	TAL; 18	NHA	NZH	CLT; 17																						69th	285	
1997	Phoenix Racing	4	Chevy															DOV; 33	SBO	GLN	MLW	MYB	GTY	IRP	MCH	BRI	DAR	RCH	DOV	CLT	CAL	CAR	HOM						69th	285	
1998	Sterling Marlin Racing	1	Chevy	DAY	CAR	LVS	NSV; 7	DAR	BRI	TEX	HCY	TAL; 30	NHA	NZH	CLT; 40	DOV	RCH	PPR	GLN	MLW	MYB	CAL	SBO	IRP	MCH	BRI; 23	DAR	RCH	DOV	CLT; 10	GTY	CAR	ATL	HOM					58th	490	
1999	Joe Gibbs Racing	42	Pontiac	DAY	CAR	LVS; 33	ATL	DAR	TEX; DNQ				CAL; DNQ	NHA	RCH	NZH	CLT	DOV	SBO	GLN	MLW	MYB	PPR	GTY	IRP														54th	777	
1999	Sterling Marlin Racing	14	Chevy							NSV; 34	BRI; 8	TAL														MCH; 12	BRI; 4	DAR; 9	RCH	DOV	CLT	CAR; DNQ	MEM; 31	PHO	HOM				54th	777	
2000	Team SABCO	82	Chevy	DAY	CAR	LVS	ATL	DAR	BRI; 1*	TEX	NSV	TAL	CAL	RCH	NHA	CLT	DOV	SBO	MYB	GLN	MLW	NZH	PPR	GTY	IRP	MCH													62nd	525	
2000	Team SABCO	01	Chevy																								BRI; 5	DAR; 7	RCH; 43	DOV	CLT; DNQ	CAR	MEM	PHO	HOM; DNQ				62nd	525	
2004	Phoenix Racing	1	Dodge	DAY	CAR	LVS	DAR	BRI	TEX	NSH	TAL	CAL	GTY	RCH	NZH	CLT	DOV	NSH	KEN	MLW	DAY	CHI	NHA	PPR	IRP	MCH	BRI	CAL; 37	RCH	DOV	KAN	CLT; 21	MEM	ATL	PHO	DAR	HOM		102nd	152	
2005	FitzBradshaw Racing	40	Dodge	DAY; 42	CAL; 15	MXC	LVS; 25	ATL; QL^{‡}	NSH; 37	BRI; 5	TEX; 19	PHO	TAL; 21	DAR; 39	RCH; 10	CLT; 2	DOV	NSH; QL^{¤}	KEN; 6	MLW	DAY; 41	CHI; 35	NHA	PPR				MCH; 12	BRI; 25	CAL	RCH	DOV; 17	KAN	CLT; 5	MEM	TEX; 22	PHO	HOM	29th	1985	
2005	FitzBradshaw Racing	12	Dodge																						GTY; 12	IRP	GLN												29th	1985	
2007	Phoenix Racing	1	Chevy	DAY	CAL	MXC	LVS	ATL	BRI	NSH	TEX	PHO	TAL	RCH	DAR	CLT	DOV	NSH	KEN	MLW	NHA	DAY	CHI	GTY	IRP	CGV	GLN	MCH	BRI	CAL	RCH	DOV; 15	KAN	CLT	MEM; 26	TEX	PHO	HOM	106th	203	
2008	Phoenix Racing	1	Chevy	DAY	CAL	LVS	ATL	BRI	NSH; 22	TEX	PHO	MXC	TAL	RCH	DAR	CLT	DOV	NSH	KEN	MLW	NHA	DAY	CHI	GTY	IRP	CGV	GLN	MCH	BRI	CAL	RCH	DOV	KAN	CLT	MEM	TEX	PHO	HOM	118th	97	
^{†} - Qualified but replaced by Hermie Sadler · ^{‡} - Qualified but replaced by Reed Sorenson · ^{¤} - Qualified for Johnny Benson Jr.

=== ARCA SuperCar Series ===
(key) (Bold – Pole position awarded by qualifying time. Italics – Pole position earned by points standings or practice time. * – Most laps led.)

ARCA SuperCar Series results
Year	Team	No.	Make	1	2	3	4	5	6	7	8	9	10	11	12	13	14	15	16	17	18	19	20	21	ASCC	Pts	Ref
1977	Cunningham-Kelley Racing	14	Chevy	TOL	DAY	QCS	BFS	NSV	FRS	TOL	SLM	AVS	TAL; 13	TOL	SND	SLM									NA	0	
1978	Cunningham-Kelley Racing	14	Chevy	DAY	QCS	AVS	NSV; 3	IMS	LOR	FRS	TAL; 21	FRS	CMS	JEF											NA	0	
1979	Cunningham-Kelley Racing	14	Chevy	AVS	DAY	NSV	FRS	SLM	DSP	IMS	TAL; 16	FRS													NA	0	
1982		4	Pontiac	NSV; 34	DAY	TAL	FRS	CMS	WIN	NSV	TAT	TAL	FRS	BFS	MIL	SND									NA	0	
1992	Blackstock Racing	12	Pontiac	DAY	FIF	TWS	TAL	TOL	KIL	POC	MCH	FRS	KIL	NSH; 32	DEL	POC	HPT	FRS	ISF	TOL	DSF	TWS	SLM	ATL	138th	-	
Results before 1979 may be incomplete.

=== International Race of Champions ===
(key) (Bold – Pole position. * – Most laps led.)

International Race of Champions results
Year	Make	1	2	3	4	Pos.	Pts	Ref
1996	Pontiac	DAY; 4	TAL; 4	CLT; 11	MCH; 6	6th	40	
2002	Pontiac	DAY; 8	CAL; 4	CHI; 7	IND; 7	10th	35	

Achievements
Preceded by Dale Jarrett	Daytona 500 winner 1994, 1995	Succeeded by Dale Jarrett
Awards
Preceded by Geoff Bodine	NASCAR Winston Cup Series Rookie of the Year; 1983	Succeeded by Rusty Wallace
