= NASCAR O'Reilly Auto Parts Series at Martinsville Speedway =

NASCAR O'Reilly Auto Parts Series races at Martinsville Speedway

NASCAR O'Reilly Auto Parts Series
- Venue: Martinsville Speedway
- Location: Ridgeway, Virginia, United States

Circuit information
- Surface: Asphalt; Concrete (turns)
- Length: 0.526 mi (0.847 km)
- Turns: 4

Stock car racing events in the NASCAR O'Reilly Auto Parts Series have been held at Martinsville Speedway, in Martinsville, Virginia during numerous seasons and times of year since the series' inception in 1982.

Races were first held from 1982 to 1994, and a one-off race occurred in 2006. In 2020, the series returned after a 14-year absence, adding a second date in 2021.

== Spring race ==
NFPA 250
- Corporate sponsor: National Fire Protection Association (NFPA)
- First race: 1982
- Distance: 131.2 miles (211.1 km)
- Laps: 250; Stages 1/2: 60 each Final stage: 130
- Previous names: Dogwood 500 (1982); Miller Time 250 (1983–1984); Miller 200 (1985); Miller Classic (1988–1991); Miller 500 (1986–1987, 1992–1994); Cook Out 250 (2021); Call 811 Before You Dig 250 powered by Call811.com (2022); Call 811.com Before You Dig 250 (2023); Dude Wipes 250 (2024); US Marine Corps 250 (2025)
- Most wins (driver): Sam Ard; Jimmy Hensley (2)
- Most wins (team): Joe Gibbs Racing (3)
- Most wins (manufacturer): Chevrolet (5)

The NFPA 250 is a NASCAR O'Reilly Auto Parts Series stock car racing spring event at Martinsville Speedway, in Martinsville, Virginia. Originally held from 1982 to 1994 as a standalone spring meeting, in 2021 the event returned as part of a three-day tripleheader.

Justin Allgaier is the defending race winner, having won the event in 2026.

=== History ===
It was first held as a Late Model Sportsman and Modified doubleheader in 1970, and in 1982 the Late Model Sportsman feature changed to a touring format for the original 1982 Budweiser Late Model Sportsman season, and stayed as a touring race until 1994. Following the 1994 season, both of Martinsville's race, the Miller 500 and the Advance Auto 500, were converted to Late Model only races. The March Late Model race was discontinued at the end of the 1997 season.

In 2021, the Xfinity Series restored Martinsville's spring date as a night race in support of the Cup Series' Blue-Emu Maximum Pain Relief 500 and aligned with the Modified Tour where the two series race over consecutive nights, instead of racing on one day. The race was one of two Xfinity events at the short track that year along with the Draft Top 250 in the fall.

==== Distance changes ====
The race changed distances several times in its history. When first held in 1970, the Late Model Sportsman and Modified features were both 250 laps, covering 131.2 miles (211.1 km). Following the addition of local Late Models and the conversion of the Modified race into part of the NASCAR's regional touring series in 1985, the two touring races were decreased to 200 laps, 105.2 miles (169.3 km) with a 100 lap, 52.6 miles (84.7 km) Late Model feature, where it remained until the Modifieds were removed for the 1993 season, when the distance was increased to 300 laps, 157.8 miles (254.0 km) for the touring Busch Grand National cars, and 200 laps, 105.2 miles (169.3 km) for the Late Model race. When the race format became strictly Late Model only, the qualifying races and Late Model feature (25 lap heat races and last chance race) totaled 300 laps. The race was discontinued after the 1997 season, and only the fall race was held for Late Models.

The 2021 Cup Weekend format returned to the 1970-84 format of 250 laps. The Whelen Modified Tour returned as the Thursday night feature, with the Xfinity race the Friday night feature. No practice or qualifying were held as part of post-pandemic restrictions, but they returned for the 2022 running.

=== Past winners ===
Year	Date	No.	Driver	Team	Manufacturer	Race Distance		Race Time	Average Speed (mph)	Report	Ref
Year	Date	No.	Driver	Team	Manufacturer	Laps	Miles (km)	Race Time	Average Speed (mph)	Report	Ref
1982	March 28	00	Sam Ard	Thomas Brothers Racing	Oldsmobile	250	131.25 (211.226)	N/A	67.244	Report	
1983	March 20	00	Sam Ard	Thomas Brothers Racing	Oldsmobile	250	131.25 (211.226)	2:05:46	62.682	Report	
1984	March 25	11	Jack Ingram	Jack Ingram Racing	Pontiac	250	131.5 (211.628)	1:42:16	77.751	Report	
1985	April 6	5	Brett Bodine	Hendrick Motorsports	Pontiac	200	105.2 (169.302)	1:43:08	61.202	Report	
1986	March 23	7	Morgan Shepherd	Whitaker Racing	Pontiac	200	105.2 (169.302)	1:30:42	69.592	Report	
1987	March 22	75	Brad Teague	Henderson Motorsports	Chevrolet	200	105.2 (169.302)	1:36:36	65.229	Report	
1988	March 13	5	Jimmy Hensley	Sam Ard	Buick	200	105.2 (169.302)	1:29:52	70.237	Report	
1989	March 12	99	Tommy Ellis	J&J Racing	Buick	200	105.2 (169.302)	1:39:12	63.629	Report	
1990	March 11	6	Tommy Houston	Houston Racing	Buick	200	105.2 (169.302)	1:38:18	64.212	Report	
1991	March 10	25	Jimmy Hensley	Beverly Racing	Oldsmobile	200	105.2 (169.302)	1:32:04	68.559	Report	
1992	March 22	36	Kenny Wallace	Rusty Wallace Racing	Pontiac	200	105.2 (169.302)	1:26:12	73.225	Report	
1993	May 8	2	Ward Burton	A.G. Dillard Motorsports	Buick	300	157.8 (253.954)	2:14:59	70.142	Report	
1994	March 20	14	Terry Labonte	Labonte Motorsports	Chevrolet	300	157.8 (253.954)	2:12:25	71.511	Report	
1995 – 2020	Not held										
2021	April 9–11*	8	Josh Berry	JR Motorsports	Chevrolet	250	131.5 (211.628)	2:12:02	59.758	Report	
2022	April 8	19	Brandon Jones	Joe Gibbs Racing	Toyota	261*	137.286 (220.939)	2:26:50	56.099	Report	
2023	April 15	20	John Hunter Nemechek	Joe Gibbs Racing	Toyota	250	131.5 (211.628)	2:12:50	59.398	Report	
2024	April 6	20	Aric Almirola	Joe Gibbs Racing	Toyota	251*	132.026 (212.474)	2:07:48	61.984	Report	
2025	March 29	21	Austin Hill	Richard Childress Racing	Chevrolet	256*	134.656 (216.707)	2:27:56	54.615	Report	
2026	March 28	7	Justin Allgaier	JR Motorsports	Chevrolet	250	131.5 (211.628)	2:23:25	55.015	Report	
2027	April 17									Report	

- 2021: Race suspended from Friday night to Sunday afternoon due to rain.
- 2022, 2024, and 2025: Race extended due to NASCAR overtime.

==== Multiple winners (drivers) ====
# Wins	Driver	Years won
2	Sam Ard	1982, 1983
2	Jimmy Hensley	1988, 1991

==== Multiple winners (teams) ====
# Wins	Team	Years won
3	Joe Gibbs Racing	2022, 2023, 2024
2	Thomas Brothers Racing	1982, 1983
2	JR Motorsports	2021, 2026

==== Manufacturer wins ====
# Wins	Make	Years won
5	(United States) Chevrolet	1987, 1994, 2021, 2025, 2026
4	(United States) Pontiac	1984-1986, 1992
4	(United States) Buick	1988-1990, 1993
3	(United States) Oldsmobile	1982, 1983, 1991
3	(Japan) Toyota	2022, 2023, 2024

== Summer race ==
Goody's 250
- Corporate sponsor: Goody's Powder
- First race: 2006
- Last race: 2006
- Distance: 78.9 miles (127.0 km)
- Laps: 250
- Previous names: Goody's 250 (2006)
- Most wins (driver): Kevin Harvick (1)
- Most wins (team): Richard Childress Racing (1)
- Most wins (manufacturer): Chevrolet (1)

The Goody's 250 was a NASCAR Busch Series stock car race held at Martinsville Speedway, in Martinsville, Virginia. Held in 2006, after an absence since 1994, it was held during the summer.

Kevin Harvick was the winner of the 2006 event.

=== History ===
It had been planned the race would be held at night, under a temporary lighting system to be installed at the track, but it was held in the afternoon instead. The event replaced the ITT Industries & Goulds Pumps Salute to the Troops 250 at Pikes Peak International Raceway on the Busch Series schedule. The race was replaced in 2007 by the NAPA Auto Parts 200 at the Circuit Gilles Villeneuve road course in Montreal, Quebec, Canada.

=== Past winners ===
Year	Date	No.	Driver	Team	Manufacturer	Race Distance		Race Time	Average Speed (mph)	Report	Ref
Year	Date	No.	Driver	Team	Manufacturer	Laps	Miles (km)	Race Time	Average Speed (mph)	Report	Ref
2006	July 22	21	Kevin Harvick	Richard Childress Racing	Chevrolet	250	131.5 (211.628)	2:09:03	61.139	Report	

== September race ==
Zerex 150
- Corporate sponsor: Zerex Antifreeze
- First race: 1982
- Last race: 1990
- Distance: 78.9 miles (127.0 km)
- Laps: 150
- Previous names: Autumn 150 (1982–1983); Nationwise 150 (1986–1987); Advance Auto 150 (1988); Zerex 150 (1989–1990)
- Most wins (driver): Sam Ard; Tommy Houston (2)
- Most wins (team): Thomas Brothers Racing; Ardnt Racing (2)
- Most wins (manufacturer): Buick (4)

The Zerex 150 was a NASCAR Busch Series stock car race held at Martinsville Speedway, in Martinsville, Virginia.

With a distance of 150 laps, 78.9 miles (127.0 km), it was the shortest of Martinsville's three Busch races.

Jeff Burton was the final winner of the event, having won the event in 1990.

=== History ===
It was first held during the inaugural season for the Busch Series in 1982, as well as 1983. It was removed from the schedule in 1984, but returned in 1986. It was removed permanently following the 1990 season. It was a third Busch Series race at Martinsville in the seasons it was held, scheduled after the Miller 500 held early in the season, and about one month prior to the Advance Auto 500, the final race of the season.

=== Past winners ===
Year	Date	No.	Driver	Team	Manufacturer	Race Distance		Race Time	Average Speed (mph)	Report	Ref
Year	Date	No.	Driver	Team	Manufacturer	Laps	Miles (km)	Race Time	Average Speed (mph)	Report	Ref
1982	September 25	00	Sam Ard	Thomas Brothers Racing	Oldsmobile	150	78.75 (126.735)	0:59.25	79.607	Report	
1983	September 24	00	Sam Ard	Thomas Brothers Racing	Oldsmobile	150	78.75 (126.735)	1:18.57	59.848	Report	
1984 – 1985	Not held										
1986	September 21	6	Tommy Houston	Arndt Racing	Buick	150	78.9 (126.977)	1:06:30	71.188	Report	
1987	September 26	22	Rick Mast	A.G. Dillard Motorsports	Pontiac	150	78.9 (126.977)	1:10:12	67.436	Report	
1988	September 24	7	Harry Gant	Whitaker Racing	Buick	150	78.9 (126.977)	1:14:29	63.558	Report	
1989	September 23	6	Tommy Houston	Arndt Racing	Buick	150	78.9 (126.977)	1:02:09	76.171	Report	
1990	September 22	12	Jeff Burton	Sam Ard	Buick	150	78.9 (126.977)	1:11:28	66.241	Report	

==== Multiple winners (drivers) ====
# Wins	Driver	Years won
2	Sam Ard	1982, 1983
2	Tommy Houston	1986, 1989

==== Multiple winners (teams) ====
# Wins	Team	Years won
2	Thomas Brothers Racing	1982, 1983
2	Arndt Racing	1986, 1987

==== Manufacturer wins ====
# Wins	Make	Years won
4	(United States) Buick	1986, 1988-1990
2	(United States) Oldsmobile	1982, 1983
1	(United States) Pontiac	1987

== Fall race ==
National Debt Relief 250
- Corporate sponsor: National Debt Relief
- First race: 1970
- First race: 1982
- Distance: 157.8 mi (254.0 km)
- Laps: 250; Stages 1/2: 60 each Final stage: 130
- Previous names: Cardinal 250 (1982–1984); Winn-Dixie 500 (1985–1986); Winston Classic (1987–1992); Advance Auto Parts 500 (1993); Advance Auto 500 (1994); Draft Top 250 (2020); Dead On Tools 250 (2021–2023); National Debt Relief 250 (2024, 2026); IAA and Ritchie Bros. 250 (2025)
- Most wins (driver): Harry Gant (2)
- Most wins (team): Joe Gibbs Racing (4)
- Most wins (manufacturer): Pontiac (5)

The National Debt Relief 250 is a NASCAR O'Reilly Auto Parts Series stock car race held at Martinsville Speedway in Martinsville, Virginia.

Carson Kvapil is the defending race winner, having won the event in 2026.

=== History ===
Originally a Late Model race when it began in 1970, it joined the Budweiser Late Model Sportsman touring series in 1982 (the original year), and remained a part of the series through 1994. Following the 1994 season, both of Martinsville's races, the Miller 500 and the Advance Auto 500, were switched to a late model-only race with the ValleyStar Credit Union 300. The Advance Auto 500 served as the final race of the season for the series for ten years, from 1982 through 1991. The track was given a date on the O'Reilly Auto Parts Series schedule again starting in 2020, after a brief one-off return in 2006.

The O'Reilly Auto Parts Series returned to Martinsville in 2020 for a night race at the track in the fall as part of a triple-header with the NASCAR Craftsman Truck Series and NASCAR Cup Series. It was the second-to-last race of the season. In 2020, Draft Top was the title sponsor of the 250 lap race in 2021, Dead On Tools was the title sponsor of the race and in 2024 and 2026, National Debt Relief became the sponsor of the race. IAA and Ritchie Bros. sponsored the race in 2025.

=== Distance changes ===
The race changed distances several times in its history. From its inception until 1984, the twin feature races was 250 laps for each division, covering 131.2 miles (211.1 km). When both the Modified and Late Model Sportsman cars had both become touring format races, the local Late Model feature reduced the Modified and Busch features in 1985 to 200 laps, 105.2 miles (169.3 km). After Modifieds were dropped in 1993 in light of early 1990s safety issues, the distance was increased to 300 laps, 157.8 miles (254.0 km), while the Late Model race increased to 200 laps, when it changed in 1994 to 300 laps. When the 1st revival occurred the race was changed to 250 laps & now for the 2nd revival it will go remain to 250 laps.

As was the tradition at Martinsville, the two non-Cup race weekends featured two or three races that totaled 500 laps, a tradition still in place today by the now-Late Model only race, with qualifying races totaling 100 laps and a 200-lap feature.

=== Past winners ===
Year	Date	No.	Driver	Team	Manufacturer	Race Distance		Race Time	Average Speed (mph)	Report	Ref
Year	Date	No.	Driver	Team	Manufacturer	Laps	Miles (km)	Race Time	Average Speed (mph)	Report	Ref
1982	October 31	01	Butch Lindley	Emanuel Zervakis	Pontiac	250	131.25 (211.226)	2:08:12	61.420	Report	
1983	October 30	00	Sam Ard	Thomas Brothers Racing	Oldsmobile	250	131.25 (211.226)	2:10:03	60.669	Report	
1984	October 28	1	Morgan Shepherd	Lindy White	Pontiac	250	131.5 (211.628)	2:10:23	60.513	Report	
1985	October 27	12	Tommy Ellis	Eric Freedlander	Pontiac	200	105.2 (169.302)	1:26:01	73.831	Report	
1986	November 2	00	Brett Bodine	Thomas Brothers Racing	Oldsmobile	200	105.2 (169.302)	1:28:29	71.335	Report	
1987	November 1	5	Jimmy Hensley	Sam Ard	Buick	200	105.2 (169.302)	1:27:10	72.413	Report	
1988	October 30	7	Harry Gant	Whitaker Racing	Buick	200	105.2 (169.302)	1:33:08	65.083	Report	
1989	October 29	2	L. D. Ottinger	Parker Racing	Pontiac	200	105.2 (169.302)	1:31:56	68.658	Report	
1990	October 28	31	Steve Grissom	Grissom Racing Enterprises	Oldsmobile	200	105.2 (169.302)	1:25:16	74.026	Report	
1991	October 27	7	Harry Gant	Whitaker Racing	Buick	200	105.2 (169.302)	1:20:16	78.637	Report	
1992	October 18	44	Bobby Labonte	Labonte Motorsports	Chevrolet	200	105.2 (169.302)	1:32:57	67.907	Report	
1993	October 17	63	Chuck Bown	Hensley Motorsports	Pontiac	300	157.8 (253.954)	2:12:59	71.197	Report	
1994	October 16	8	Kenny Wallace	FILMAR Racing	Ford	300	157.8 (253.954)	2:15:39	69.797	Report	
1995 – 2019	Not held										
2020	October 31	20	Harrison Burton	Joe Gibbs Racing	Toyota	250	131.5 (211.628)	2:07:56	61.673	Report	
2021	October 30	9	Noah Gragson	JR Motorsports	Chevrolet	257*	135.182 (217.553)	2:10:48	62.01	Report	
2022	October 29	54	Ty Gibbs	Joe Gibbs Racing	Toyota	269*	141.494 (227.711)	2:20:32	60.401	Report	
2023	October 28	7	Justin Allgaier	JR Motorsports	Chevrolet	256*	134.656 (216.707)	2:26:07	55.294	Report	
2024	November 2	20	Aric Almirola	Joe Gibbs Racing	Toyota	250	131.5 (211.628)	2:11:30	60	Report	
2025	October 25	54	Taylor Gray	Joe Gibbs Racing	Toyota	253*	133.078 (214.168)	2:06:30	63.12	Report	
2026	October 31	1	Carson Kvapil	JR Motorsports	Chevrolet	250	131.5 (211.628)	2:18:13	57.084	Report	
2027	November 6									Report	

- 2021, 2022, 2023 & 2025: Race extended due to NASCAR overtime.

==== Multiple winners (drivers) ====
# Wins	Driver	Years won
2	Harry Gant	1988, 1991

==== Multiple winners (teams) ====
# Wins	Team	Years won
4	Joe Gibbs Racing	2020, 2022, 2024, 2025
3	JR Motorsports	2021, 2023, 2026
2	Thomas Brothers Racing	1983, 1986
2	Whitaker Racing	1988, 1991

==== Manufacturer wins ====
# Wins	Make	Years won
5	(United States) Pontiac	1982, 1984, 1985, 1989, 1993
4	(Japan) Toyota	2020, 2022, 2024, 2025
4	(United States) Chevrolet	1992, 2021, 2023, 2026
2	(United States) Oldsmobile	1983, 1986, 1990
2	(United States) Buick	1987, 1988, 1991
1	(United States) Ford	1994

Previous race: Suburban Propane 300	NASCAR O'Reilly Auto Parts Series; NFPA 250	Next race: Ag-Pro 300

Previous race: TPG 250	NASCAR O'Reilly Auto Parts Series; National Debt Relief 250	Next race: O'Reilly Auto Parts 300
