= 2006 Goody's 250 =

Race details
- Race 21 of 35 in the 2006 NASCAR Busch Series
- Date: July 22, 2006
- Location: Martinsville Speedway, Martinsville, Virginia
- Course: Permanent racing facility
- Course length: 0.526 miles (0.847 km)
- Distance: 250 laps, 131.5 mi (211.629 km)
- Average speed: 61.139 mph (98.394 km/h)

Pole position
Driver	Clint Bowyer	Richard Childress Racing
- Time: 19.735

Most laps led
Driver	Kevin Harvick	Richard Childress Racing
- Laps: 149

Winner
No. 21	Kevin Harvick	Richard Childress Racing

Television in the United States
- Network: NBC
- Announcers: Allen Bestwick, Wally Dallenbach Jr.
- Nielsen ratings: 1.7 (Final); (1,926,000 million)

The Goody's 250 was a NASCAR Busch Series stock car race held at Martinsville Speedway, in Martinsville, Virginia. The race was only held once, on July 22, 2006, as a standalone event during the summer. It had been planned the race would be held at night, under a temporary lighting system to be installed at the track, instead it was held in the afternoon instead. The Goody's 250 replaced the ITT Industries & Goulds Pumps Salute to the Troops 250 on the Busch Series schedule. After a Busch Series Martinsville record high 19 cautions for 87 laps, the Goody's 250 was replaced in 2007 by the NAPA Auto Parts 200 at the Circuit Gilles Villeneuve road course in Montreal, Quebec, Canada; second-division NASCAR racing would not return to the track until 2020. The race was the final start in NASCAR for Darrell Waltrip and Ricky Craven.

== Report ==
=== Background ===
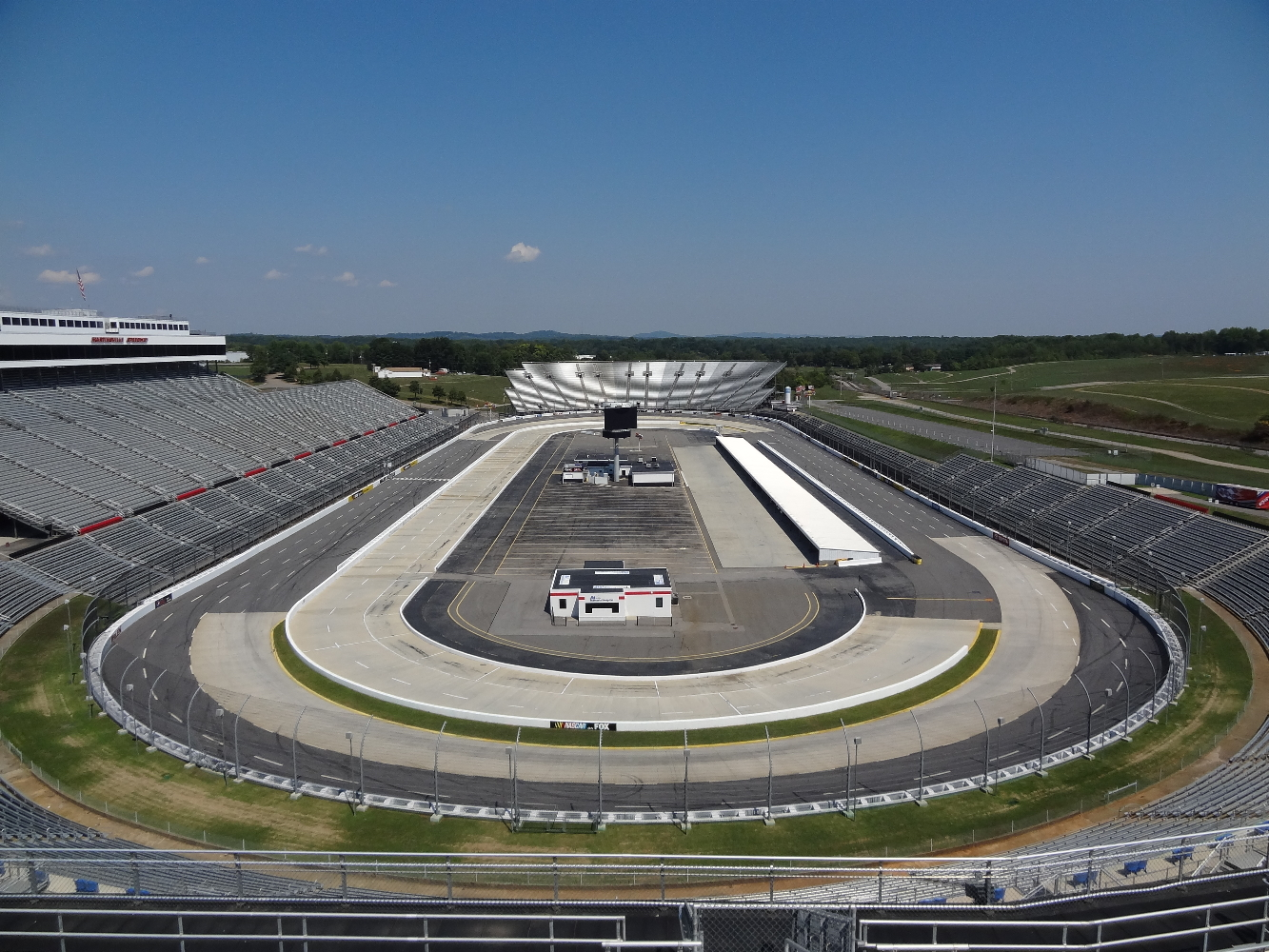
Martinsville Speedway, where the race was held

The Goody's 250 was the 21st out of 35 scheduled stock car races of the 2006 NASCAR Busch Series. It was held on July 22, 2006 at Martinsville Speedway, in Martinsville, Virginia, a short track that holds NASCAR races. The standard track at Martinsville Speedway is a four-turn, 0.526-mile (0.847 km) oval. Its turns are banked at eleven degrees, and neither the front stretch (the location of the finish line) nor the back stretch is banked.

Before the race, Kevin Harvick led the Drivers' Championship with 3,092 points, with Carl Edwards in second and Clint Bowyer third. Denny Hamlin and J. J. Yeley were fourth and fifth, and Greg Biffle, Paul Menard, Kyle Busch, Johnny Sauter and Kenny Wallace rounded out the top ten. This was the first Busch Series race to be held at Martinsville since October 1994, and it had been planned the race would be held under night conditions with a temporary lighting system installed at the track, but it was held in the afternoon instead.

Two drivers chose to make a one-off return to NASCAR at the race. Three-time Winston Cup Series champion Darrell Waltrip drove the No. 99 Michael Waltrip Racing car by gaining his wife Stevie's permission after his younger brother Michael Waltrip asked if he wanted to race. Since his car was 16th in the Owner's Championship, Waltrip earned an automatic qualifying berth for the event. Despite winning eleven times at Martinsville in the Nextel Cup Series, the Goody's 250 marked Waltrip's first appearance at the track in the Busch Series. Waltrip said he was entering the race because of his belief he could be competitive: "I’m going to come in there, I’ve got the latest and greatest equipment and Michael’s bunch is excited, I’m pumped and I think we’ll have a lot of fun." 1992 NASCAR Busch Series Rookie of the Year and two-time Nextel Cup winner Ricky Craven returned to drive the No. 14 car owned by FitzBradshaw Racing. However, unlike Waltrip, Craven needed to qualify since both FitzBradshaw cars were not within the top-thirty placings in the Owners' Championship. Other drivers returning to compete in the Busch Series included Burney Lamar and Boris Said.

=== Entry list ===
(R) denotes rookie driver

#	Driver	Team	Make
00	Johnny Sauter	Haas CNC Racing	Chevrolet
0	Kertus Davis	Davis Motorsports	Chevrolet
01	Jay Sauter	Duesenberg & Leik Motorsports	Chevrolet
1	Mike Wallace	Phoenix Racing	Dodge
2	Clint Bowyer	Richard Childress Racing	Chevrolet
4	Auggie Vidovich	Biagi Brothers Racing	Dodge
5	Dennis Setzer	Hendrick Motorsports	Chevrolet
06	Todd Kluever (R)	Roush Racing	Ford
08	Jason White	Ashton Gray Racing	Dodge
9	Boris Said	Evernham Motorsports	Dodge
10	John Andretti (R)	ppc Racing	Ford
11	Paul Menard	Dale Earnhardt Inc.	Chevrolet
12	Carlos Contreras	FitzBradshaw Racing	Dodge
14	Ricky Craven	FitzBradshaw Racing	Dodge
18	J. J. Yeley	Joe Gibbs Racing	Chevrolet
20	Aric Almirola	Joe Gibbs Racing	Chevrolet
21	Kevin Harvick	Richard Childress Racing	Chevrolet
22	Kenny Wallace	ppc Racing	Ford
23	Carl Long	Keith Coleman Racing	Chevrolet
25	Ashton Lewis	Team Rensi Motorsports	Ford
27	David Green	Brewco Motorsports	Ford
32	Chase Pistone	Braun-Akins Racing	Chevrolet
33	Ron Hornaday Jr.	Kevin Harvick Inc.	Chevrolet
34	Mike Bliss	Frank Cicci Racing	Chevrolet
35	Regan Smith	Team Rensi Motorsports	Ford
36	Tim Sauter	McGill Motorsports	Chevrolet
38	Jason Leffler	Braun-Akins Racing	Chevrolet
41	Kevin Hamlin	Chip Ganassi Racing	Dodge
47	Jon Wood	Wood Brothers/JTG Racing	Ford
49	Shane Hall	Jay Robinson Racing	Ford
50	Danny O'Quinn Jr. (R)	Roush Racing	Ford
56	Kevin Grubb	Mac Hill Motorsports	Chevrolet
59	Stacy Compton	Wood Brothers/JTG Racing	Ford
60	Carl Edwards	Roush Racing	Ford
64	Steve Wallace	Rusty Wallace Inc.	Dodge
66	Greg Biffle	Brewco Motorsports	Ford
71	Ron Young	RB1 Motorsports	Chevrolet
72	Randy MacDonald	MacDonald Motorsports	Chevrolet
75	Caleb Holman	Henderson Motorsports	Chevrolet
77	Burney Lamar (R)	Kevin Harvick Inc.	Chevrolet
78	Jerry Robertson	Furniture Row Racing	Chevrolet
84	David Gilliland	Clay Andrews Racing	Chevrolet
85	Eric McClure	Premier Motorsports	Chevrolet
88	Mark McFarland (R)	JR Motorsports	Chevrolet
89	Richard Landreth	Long Brothers Racing	Ford
90	Matt McCall	Robert Yates Racing	Ford
99	Darrell Waltrip	Michael Waltrip Racing	Dodge
Entry list

=== Practice and qualifying ===
Three practice sessions were held before the Saturday race: all three took place on Friday. The first session ran for 60 minutes, with a half hour practice session reserved for rookie drivers following shortly after. The final practice session lasted 60 minutes. A one-hour test session was scheduled beforehand and it saw Jason Leffler set the only lap time to go under the twenty seconds mark at 19.888 seconds, ahead of the No. 64 car shared by Steve Wallace and his father Rusty Wallace. Sauter was third, Mark McFarland placed fourth, and Menard rounded out the top five. Mike Bliss, Caleb Holman and Eric McClure crashed during the session and the damage to their cars necessitated their withdrawal from the race.

In the first practice session, Stacy Compton was the quickest driver in the field with a lap of 20.010 seconds, seven thousands of a second faster than anyone else on the track. His closest challenger was Steve Wallace in second, with Leffler third, and Brandon Miller fourth. McFarland was fifth-fastest, and Matt McCall came sixth. Kevin Hamlin, Randy LaJoie, David Green, and Dennis Setzer rounded out the session's top ten drivers. Sauter paced the final practice session with a time of 19.877 seconds; Leffler was 0.026 seconds in arrears in second and Casey Atwood came third. Menard was fourth-quickest, ahead of Green and Aric Almirola. McFarland was seventh-fastest, Lamar placed eighth, Ron Hornaday Jr. ninth and Jason Keller completed the top ten heading into qualifying.

=== Starting grid ===
Grid	No.	Driver	Team	Manufacturer
1	2	Clint Bowyer	Richard Childress Racing	Chevrolet
2	01	Jay Sauter	Duesenberg & Leik Motorsports	Chevrolet
3	20	Denny Hamlin** ***	Joe Gibbs Racing	Chevrolet
4	88	Mark McFarland (R)	JR Motorsports	Chevrolet
5	00	Johnny Sauter	Haas CNC Racing	Chevrolet
6	21	Kevin Harvick	Richard Childress Racing	Chevrolet
7	66	Greg Biffle	Brewco Motorsports	Ford
8	5	Kyle Busch** ***	Hendrick Motorsports	Chevrolet
9	41	Reed Sorenson** ***	Chip Ganassi Racing	Dodge
10	18	J. J. Yeley	Joe Gibbs Racing	Chevrolet
11	64	Steve Wallace	Rusty Wallace Inc.	Dodge
12	38	Jason Leffler	Braun-Akins Motorsports	Chevrolet
13	60	Carl Edwards	Roush Racing	Ford
14	36	Tim Sauter	McGill Motorsports	Chevrolet
15	11	Paul Menard	Dale Earnhardt Inc.	Chevrolet
16	77	Burney Lamar (R)	Kevin Harvick Inc.	Chevrolet
17	10	John Andretti (R)	ppc Racing	Ford
18	4	Auggie Vidovich	Biagi Brothers Racing	Dodge
19	1	Mike Wallace	Phoenix Racing	Chevrolet
20	27	David Green	Brewco Motorsports	Ford
21	25	Ashton Lewis	Team Rensi Motorsports	Ford
22	78	Jerry Robertson	Furniture Row Motorsports	Chevrolet
23	22	Kenny Wallace	ppc Racing	Ford
24	56	Kevin Grubb	Mac Hill Motorsports	Chevrolet
25	90	Matt McCall	Robert Yates Racing	Ford
26	9	Boris Said	Evernham Motorsports	Dodge
27	84	David Gilliland	Clay Andrews Racing	Chevrolet
28	08	Jason White	Ashton Gray Racing	Dodge
29	33	Ron Hornaday	Kevin Harvick Inc.	Chevrolet
30	0	Kertus Davis	Davis Motorsports	Chevrolet
31	12	Carlos Contreras	FitzBradshaw Motorsports	Dodge
32	32	Chase Pistone	Braun-Akins Racing	Chevrolet
33	06	Todd Kluever (R)	Roush Racing	Ford
34	59	Stacy Compton	Wood Brothers/JTG Racing	Ford
35	35	Regan Smith	Team Rensi Motorsports	Ford
36	47	Jon Wood	Wood Brothers/JTG Racing	Ford
37	49	Shane Hall	Jay Robinson Racing	Ford
38	50	Danny O'Quinn Jr. (R)	Roush Racing	Ford
39	72	Randy MacDonald	MacDonald Motorsports	Chevrolet
40	14	Ricky Craven	FitzBradshaw Racing	Dodge
41	99	Darrell Waltrip	Michael Waltrip Racing	Dodge
42	71	Ron Young	RB1 Motorsports	Chevrolet
43	23	Carl Long*	Keith Coleman Racing	Chevrolet
Failed to Qualify, driver changes, or withdrew
44	89	Richard Landreth	Long Brothers Racing	Ford
DC	5	Dennis Setzer	Hendrick Motorsports	Chevrolet
DC	20	Aric Almirola	Joe Gibbs Racing	Chevrolet
DC	41	Kevin Hamlin	Chip Ganassi Racing	Dodge
WD	34	Mike Bliss	Frank Cicci Racing	Chevrolet
WD	75	Caleb Holman	Henderson Motorsports	Chevrolet
WD	85	Eric McClure	Premier Motorsports	Chevrolet
Starting grid

* – Made the field via owners points.

** – There were 3 different driver changes by Raceday as there were drivers qualifying the cars for the Cup Series drivers. Dennis Setzer qualified for Kyle Busch, Aric Almirola qualified for Denny Hamlin, and Kevin Hamlin qualified for Reed Sorenson. This was during the peak of the Buschwhacker era where Cup Series drivers would drive in the Busch Series and would ask for other drivers to qualify their Busch Series car while they tried to qualify the Cup Series race which would be the Pennsylvania 500 at the Pocono Raceway.

*** – Had to start at the rear of the field due to driver change.

== Race results ==
2006 Goody's 250 Top Ten Finishers
Pos.	Car #	Driver	Team	Make	Laps	Laps led	Status	Points
1	21	Kevin Harvick	Richard Childress Racing	Chevrolet	250	149	running	190
2	2	Clint Bowyer	Richard Childress Racing	Chevrolet	250	58	running	175
3	20	Denny Hamlin	Joe Gibbs Racing	Chevrolet	250	0	running	165
4	41	Reed Sorenson	Chip Ganassi Racing	Dodge	250	0	running	160
5	00	Johnny Sauter	Haas CNC Racing	Chevrolet	250	0	running	155
6	60	Carl Edwards	Roush Racing	Ford	250	0	running	150
7	10	John Andretti (R)	ppc Racing	Ford	250	0	running	146
8	38	Jason Leffler	Braun Racing	Chevrolet	250	0	running	142
9	18	J. J. Yeley	Joe Gibbs Racing	Chevrolet	250	0	running	138
10	01	Jay Sauter	Duesenberg & Leik Motorsports	Chevrolet	250	0	running	134
11	1	Mike Wallace	Phoenix Racing	Chevrolet	250	0	running	130
12	11	Paul Menard	Dale Earnhardt Inc.	Chevrolet	250	23	running	132
13	22	Kenny Wallace	ppc Racing	Ford	250	0	running	124
14	35	Regan Smith	Team Rensi Motorsprots	Ford	250	0	running	121
15	59	Stacy Compton	Wood Brothers/JTG Racing	Ford	250	0	running	118
16	88	Mark McFarland (R)	JR Motorsports	Chevrolet	250	0	running	115
17	66	Greg Biffle	Brewco Motorsports	Ford	250	0	running	112
18	9	Boris Said	Evernham Motorsports	Dodge	250	0	running	109
19	36	Tim Sauter	McGill Motorsports	Chevrolet	250	0	running	106
20	5	Kyle Busch	Hendrick Motorsports	Chevrolet	250	0	running	103
21	47	Jon Wood	Wood Brothers/JTG Racing	Ford	250	0	running	100
22	50	Danny O'Quinn Jr. (R)	Roush Racing	Ford	250	0	running	97
23	77	Burney Lamar (R)	Kevin Harvick Inc.	Chevrolet	250	0	running	94
24	33	Ron Hornaday	Kevin Harvick Inc.	Chevrolet	250	0	running	91
25	4	Auggie Vidovich	Biagi Brothers Racing	Dodge	250	0	running	88
26	90	Matt McCall	Robert Yates Racing	Ford	250	0	running	85
27	25	Ashton Lewis	Team Rensi Motorsports	Ford	250	0	running	82
28	99	Darrell Waltrip	Michael Waltrip Racing	Dodge	250	0	running	79
29	12	Carlos Contreras	FitzBradshaw Racing	Dodge	250	0	running	76
30	06	Todd Kluever (R)	Roush Racing	Ford	250	0	running	73
31	27	David Green	Brewco Motorsports	Ford	249	0	running	70
32	78	Jerry Robertson	Furniture Row Racing	Chevrolet	249	0	running	67
33	56	Kevin Grubb	Mac Hill Motorsports	Chevrolet	245	20	running	69
34	08	Jason White	Ashton Gray Racing	Dodge	208	0	running	61
35	64	Steve Wallace	Rusty Wallace Racing	Dodge	171	0	running	58
36	84	David Gilliland	Clay Andrews Racing	Chevrolet	162	0	crash	55
37	32	Chase Pistone	Braun-Akins Racing	Chevrolet	111	0	overheating	52
38	72	Randy MacDonald	MacDonald Motorsports	Chevrolet	72	0	engine	49
39	14	Ricky Craven	FitzBradshaw Racing	Dodge	66	0	brakes	46
40	71	Ron Young	RB1 Motorsports	Chevrolet	59	0	brakes	43
41	23	Carl Long	Keith Coleman Motorsports	Chevrolet	57	0	overheating	40
42	0	Kertus Davis	Davis Motorsports	Chevrolet	35	0	oil leak	37
43	49	Shane Hall	Jay Robinson Racing	Ford	34	0	electrical	34
Average race speed: 61.139 mph (98.394 km/h)
Lead changes: 7 among 4 drivers
Cautions: 19 for 87 laps					Winner's Prize (USD): $74,925			
