= 2020 Draft Top 250 =

Race details
- Race 32 of 33 in the 2020 NASCAR Xfinity Series season
- Date: October 31, 2020
- Location: Martinsville Speedway in Martinsville, Virginia
- Course: Permanent racing facility
- Course length: 0.526 miles (0.85 km)
- Distance: 250 laps, 131.50 mi (211.63 km)
- Average speed: 61.673 mph

Pole position
Driver	Austin Cindric	Team Penske
- Grid positions set by competition-based formula

Most laps led
Driver	Harrison Burton	Joe Gibbs Racing
- Laps: 81

Winner
No. 20	Harrison Burton	Joe Gibbs Racing

The 2020 Draft Top 250 was a NASCAR Xfinity Series race held on October 31, 2020. It was contested over 250 laps on the 0.526-mile (0.847 km) oval. It was the thirty-second race of the 2020 NASCAR Xfinity Series season, the sixth race of the playoffs, and the final race in the Round of 8. Joe Gibbs Racing driver Harrison Burton collected his fourth win of the season.

== Report ==
=== Background ===
Martinsville Speedway is a NASCAR-owned stock car racing track located in Henry County, in Ridgeway, Virginia, just to the south of Martinsville. At 0.526 miles (0.847 km) in length, it is the shortest track in the NASCAR Xfinity Series. The track was also one of the first paved oval tracks in NASCAR, being built in 1947 by H. Clay Earles. It is also the only remaining race track that has been on the NASCAR circuit from its beginning in 1948.

The race marked the return of second-tier NASCAR racing to the track, which have been absent since 1994, apart from a one-off race in 2006.

=== Entry list ===
- (R) denotes rookie driver.
- (i) denotes driver who is ineligible for series driver points.

No.	Driver	Team	Manufacturer
0	Jeffrey Earnhardt	JD Motorsports	Chevrolet
1	Michael Annett	JR Motorsports	Chevrolet
02	Brett Moffitt (i)	Our Motorsports	Chevrolet
4	Jesse Little (R)	JD Motorsports	Chevrolet
5	Matt Mills	B. J. McLeod Motorsports	Chevrolet
6	Ryan Vargas	JD Motorsports	Chevrolet
7	Justin Allgaier	JR Motorsports	Chevrolet
07	Gray Gaulding (i)	SS-Green Light Racing	Chevrolet
8	Jeb Burton	JR Motorsports	Chevrolet
08	Joe Graf Jr. (R)	SS-Green Light Racing	Chevrolet
9	Noah Gragson	JR Motorsports	Chevrolet
10	Ross Chastain	Kaulig Racing	Chevrolet
11	Justin Haley	Kaulig Racing	Chevrolet
13	Timmy Hill (i)	MBM Motorsports	Toyota
15	Colby Howard	JD Motorsports	Chevrolet
16	A. J. Allmendinger	Kaulig Racing	Chevrolet
17	J. J. Yeley	Rick Ware Racing	Ford
18	Riley Herbst (R)	Joe Gibbs Racing	Toyota
19	Brandon Jones	Joe Gibbs Racing	Toyota
20	Harrison Burton (R)	Joe Gibbs Racing	Toyota
21	Myatt Snider (R)	Richard Childress Racing	Chevrolet
22	Austin Cindric	Team Penske	Ford
26	Mason Diaz	Sam Hunt Racing	Toyota
36	Alex Labbé	DGM Racing	Chevrolet
39	Ryan Sieg	RSS Racing	Chevrolet
44	Tommy Joe Martins	Martins Motorsports	Chevrolet
47	Kyle Weatherman	Mike Harmon Racing	Chevrolet
51	Jeremy Clements	Jeremy Clements Racing	Chevrolet
52	Kody Vanderwal (R)	Means Racing	Chevrolet
61	Chad Finchum	Hattori Racing Enterprises	Toyota
66	Carl Long	MBM Motorsports	Toyota
68	Brandon Brown	Brandonbilt Motorsports	Chevrolet
74	Bayley Currey (i)	Mike Harmon Racing	Chevrolet
78	B. J. McLeod	B. J. McLeod Motorsports	Toyota
90	Donald Theetge	DGM Racing	Chevrolet
92	Josh Williams	DGM Racing	Chevrolet
93	Josh Reaume (i)	RSS Racing	Chevrolet
98	Chase Briscoe	Stewart-Haas Racing	Ford
99	Stefan Parsons	B. J. McLeod Motorsports	Toyota
Official entry list

== Qualifying ==
Austin Cindric was awarded the pole based on competition based formula.

=== Qualifying results ===
Pos	No	Driver	Team	Manufacturer
1	22	Austin Cindric	Team Penske	Ford
2	9	Noah Gragson	JR Motorsports	Chevrolet
3	11	Justin Haley	Kaulig Racing	Chevrolet
4	10	Ross Chastain	Kaulig Racing	Chevrolet
5	98	Chase Briscoe	Stewart-Haas Racing	Ford
6	7	Justin Allgaier	JR Motorsports	Chevrolet
7	19	Brandon Jones	Joe Gibbs Racing	Toyota
8	8	Jeb Burton	JR Motorsports	Chevrolet
9	39	Ryan Sieg	RSS Racing	Chevrolet
10	20	Harrison Burton (R)	Joe Gibbs Racing	Toyota
11	1	Michael Annett	JR Motorsports	Chevrolet
12	68	Brandon Brown	Brandonbilt Motorsports	Chevrolet
13	92	Josh Williams	DGM Racing	Chevrolet
14	02	Brett Moffitt	Our Motorsports	Chevrolet
15	44	Tommy Joe Martins	Martins Motorsports	Chevrolet
16	36	Alex Labbé	DGM Racing	Chevrolet
17	6	Ryan Vargas	JD Motorsports	Chevrolet
18	5	Matt Mills	B. J. McLeod Motorsports	Chevrolet
19	4	Jesse Little (R)	JD Motorsports	Toyota
20	0	Jeffrey Earnhardt	JD Motorsports	Chevrolet
21	74	Bayley Currey (i)	Mike Harmon Racing	Chevrolet
22	21	Myatt Snider (R)	Richard Childress Racing	Chevrolet
23	51	Jeremy Clements	Jeremy Clements Racing	Chevrolet
24	18	Riley Herbst (R)	Joe Gibbs Racing	Toyota
25	08	Joe Graf Jr. (R)	SS-Green Light Racing	Chevrolet
26	52	Kody Vanderwal (R)	Means Motorsports	Chevrolet
27	15	Colby Howard	JD Motorsports	Chevrolet
28	90	Donald Theetge	DGM Racing	Chevrolet
29	78	B. J. McLeod	B. J. McLeod Motorsports	Chevrolet
30	07	Gray Gaulding (i)	SS-Green Light Racing	Chevrolet
31	93	Josh Reaume (i)	RSS Racing	Chevrolet
32	61	Chad Finchum	Hattori Racing Enterprises	Toyota
33	47	Kyle Weatherman	Mike Harmon Racing	Chevrolet
34	13	Timmy Hill (i)	MBM Motorsports	Toyota
35	99	Stefan Parsons	B. J. McLeod Motorsports	Toyota
36	16	A. J. Allmendinger	Kaulig Racing	Chevrolet
37	66	Carl Long	MBM Motorsports	Toyota
38	26	Mason Diaz	Sam Hunt Racing	Toyota
39	17	J. J. Yeley (i)	Rick Ware Racing	Ford
Official qualifying results

== Race ==
=== Race results ===
==== Stage Results ====
Stage One Laps: 70

Pos	No	Driver	Team	Manufacturer	Points
1	9	Noah Gragson	JR Motorsports	Chevrolet	10
2	20	Harrison Burton	Joe Gibbs Racing	Toyota	9
3	22	Austin Cindric	Team Penske	Ford	8
4	10	Ross Chastain	Kaulig Racing	Chevrolet	7
5	11	Justin Haley	Kaulig Racing	Chevrolet	6
6	16	A. J. Allmendinger	Kaulig Racing	Chevrolet	5
7	19	Brandon Jones	Joe Gibbs Racing	Toyota	4
8	7	Justin Allgaier	JR Motorsports	Chevrolet	3
9	1	Michael Annett	JR Motorsports	Chevrolet	2
10	98	Chase Briscoe	Stewart-Haas Racing	Ford	1

Stage Two Laps: 70

Pos	No	Driver	Team	Manufacturer	Points
1	10	Ross Chastain	Kaulig Racing	Chevrolet	10
2	9	Noah Gragson	JR Motorsports	Chevrolet	9
3	11	Justin Haley	Kaulig Racing	Chevrolet	8
4	7	Justin Allgaier	JR Motorsports	Chevrolet	7
5	22	Austin Cindric	Team Penske	Ford	6
6	19	Brandon Jones	Joe Gibbs Racing	Toyota	5
7	02	Brett Moffitt (i)	Our Motorsports	Chevrolet	0
8	16	A. J. Allmendinger	Kaulig Racing	Chevrolet	3
9	20	Harrison Burton	Joe Gibbs Racing	Toyota	2
10	13	Timmy Hill (i)	MBM Motorsports	Toyota	0

=== Final Stage Results ===
Laps: 110

Pos	Grid	No	Driver	Team	Manufacturer	Laps	Points	Status
1	10	20	Harrison Burton	Joe Gibbs Racing	Toyota	250	51	Running
2	6	7	Justin Allgaier	JR Motorsports	Chevrolet	250	45	Running
3	2	9	Noah Gragson	JR Motorsports	Chevrolet	250	53	Running
4	8	8	Jeb Burton	JR Motorsports	Chevrolet	250	33	Running
5	4	10	Ross Chastain	Kaulig Racing	Chevrolet	250	49	Running
6	24	18	Riley Herbst (R)	Joe Gibbs Racing	Toyota	250	31	Running
7	5	98	Chase Briscoe	Stewart-Haas Racing	Ford	250	31	Running
8	11	1	Michael Annett	JR Motorsports	Chevrolet	250	31	Running
9	7	19	Brandon Jones	Joe Gibbs Racing	Toyota	250	37	Running
10	1	22	Austin Cindric	Team Penske	Ford	250	41	Running
11	9	39	Ryan Sieg	RSS Racing	Chevrolet	250	26	Running
12	3	11	Justin Haley	Kaulig Racing	Chevrolet	250	39	Running
13	14	02	Brett Moffitt (i)	Our Motorsports	Chevrolet	250	0	Running
14	39	17	J. J. Yeley (i)	Rick Ware Racing	Ford	250	0	Running
15	23	51	Jeremy Clements	Jeremy Clements Racing	Chevrolet	250	22	Running
16	15	44	Tommy Joe Martins	Martins Motorsports	Chevrolet	250	21	Running
17	34	13	Timmy Hill (i)	MBM Motorsports	Toyota	250	0	Running
18	12	68	Brandon Brown	Brandonbilt Motorsports	Chevrolet	250	19	Running
19	13	92	Josh Williams	DGM Racing	Chevrolet	250	18	Running
20	38	26	Mason Diaz	Sam Hunt Racing	Toyota	250	17	Running
21	25	08	Joe Graf Jr. (R)	SS-Green Light Racing	Chevrolet	250	16	Running
22	19	4	Jesse Little (R)	JD Motorsports	Chevrolet	249	15	Running
23	22	21	Myatt Snider (R)	Richard Childress Racing	Chevrolet	249	14	Running
24	35	99	Stefan Parsons	B. J. McLeod Motorsports	Toyota	249	13	Running
25	27	15	Colby Howard	JD Motorsports	Chevrolet	248	12	Running
26	36	16	A. J. Allmendinger	Kaulig Racing	Chevrolet	248	19	Running
27	16	36	Alex Labbé	DGM Racing	Chevrolet	247	10	Running
28	20	0	Jeffrey Earnhardt	JD Motorsports	Chevrolet	246	9	Running
29	26	52	Kody Vanderwal (R)	Means Motorsports	Chevrolet	246	8	Running
30	33	47	Kyle Weatherman	Mike Harmon Racing	Chevrolet	246	7	Running
31	28	90	Donald Theetge	DGM Racing	Chevrolet	245	6	Running
32	37	66	Carl Long	MBM Motorsports	Toyota	244	5	Running
33	29	78	B. J. McLeod	B. J. McLeod Motorsports	Chevrolet	239	4	Running
34	17	6	Ryan Vargas	JD Motorsports	Chevrolet	233	3	Running
35	30	07	Gray Gaulding (i)	SS-Green Light Racing	Chevrolet	230	0	Electrical
36	21	74	Bayley Currey (i)	Mike Harmon Racing	Chevrolet	178	0	Accident
37	32	61	Chad Finchum	Hattori Racing Enterprises	Toyota	120	1	Engine
38	18	5	Matt Mills	B. J. McLeod Motorsports	Toyota	103	1	Oil Line
39	31	93	Josh Reaume (i)	RSS Racing	Chevrolet	62	0	Suspension
Official race results

=== Race statistics ===
- Lead changes: 11 among 6 different drivers
- Cautions/Laps: 10 for 63
- Time of race: 2 hours, 7 minutes, and 56 seconds
- Average speed: 61.673 mph (99.253 km/h)

Previous race: 2020 O'Reilly Auto Parts 300	NASCAR Xfinity Series; 2020 season	Next race: 2020 Desert Diamond Casino West Valley 200
