= Lorain County Speedway =

Racing track in Amherst Township, Ohio

Coordinates: 41°21′34″N 82°13′00″W

Lorain County Speedway, also known as Lorain Raceway Park, is an auto racing track located in Amherst Township, Lorain County, near South Amherst, Ohio, USA opened in 1949 as a 1/3 mile dirt oval. It was paved between the 1960 and 1961 racing seasons. It is currently a 3/8-mile asphalt oval, with 12 degree banking in both turns, and slight banking on the straightaways. The track sits at 781 feet elevation.

== Gallery ==
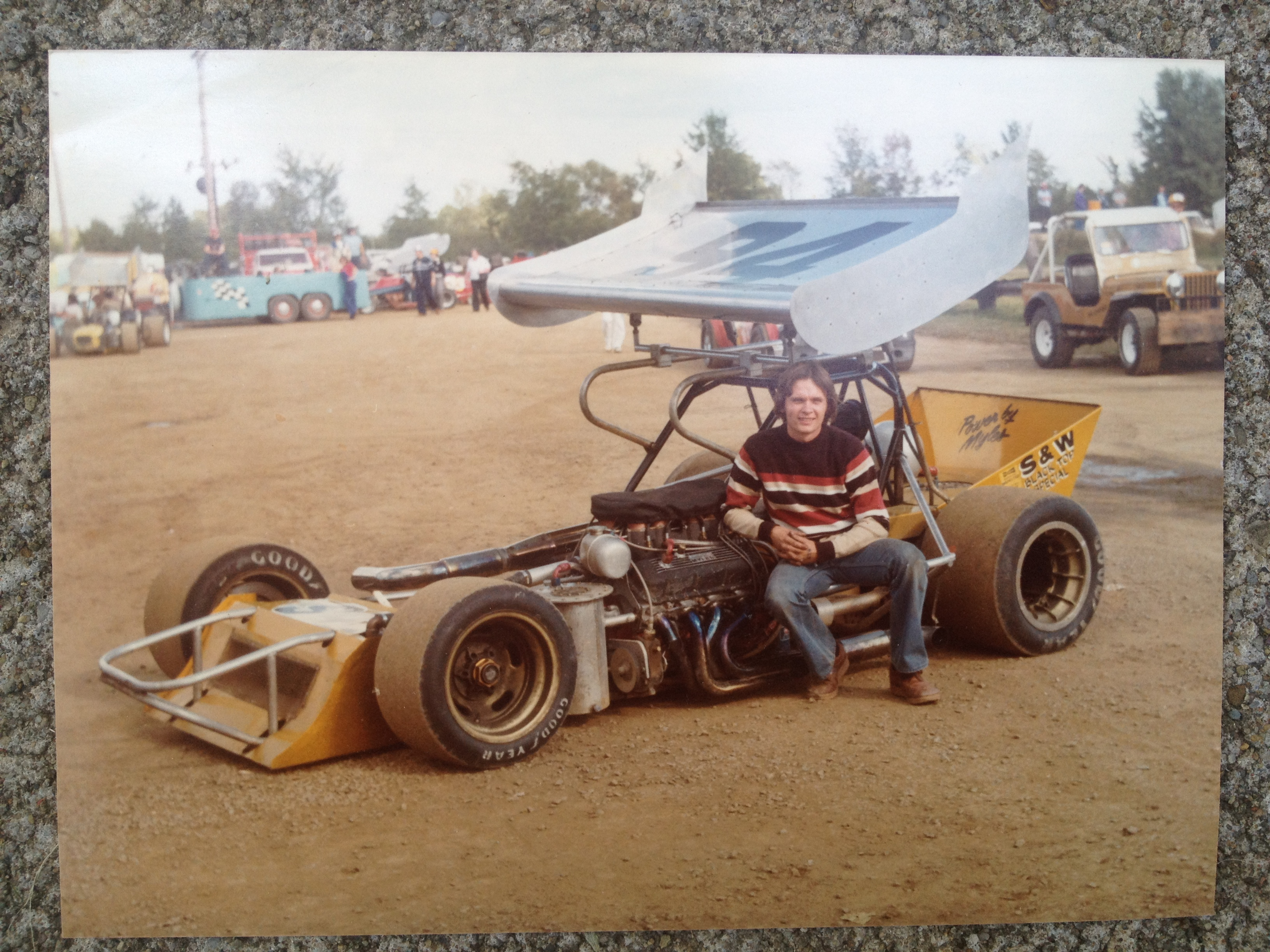
A 1979 Supermodified event at the speedway.

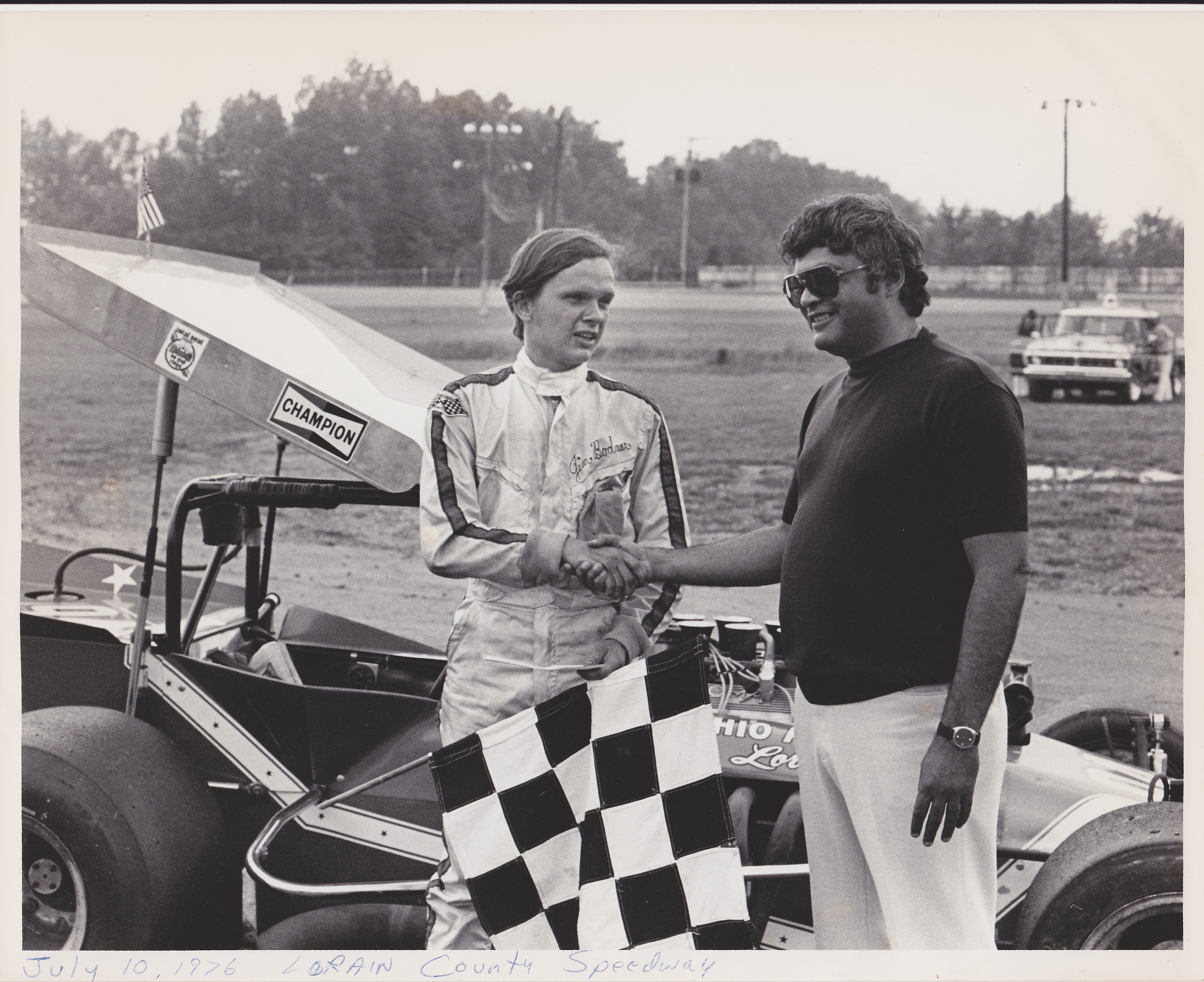
Following a 1976 Supermodified event.

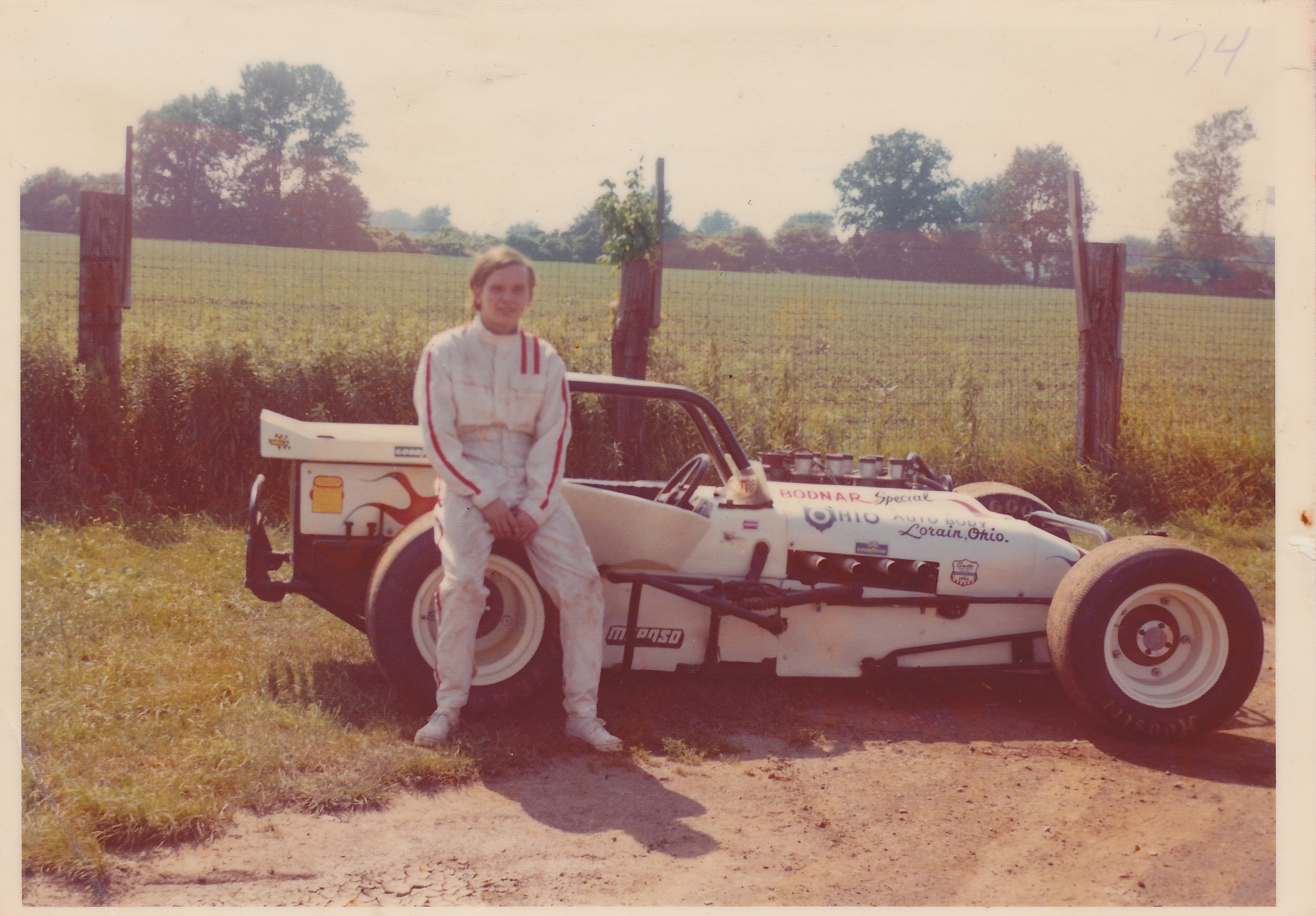
1974 Supermodified at the speedway.
