= 2006 Pennsylvania 500 =

Race details
- Race 20 of 36 in the 2006 NASCAR Nextel Cup Series
- 2006 Pennsylvania 500 program cover
- Date: July 23, 2006
- Official name: Pennsylvania 500
- Location: Pocono Raceway in Long Pond, Pennsylvania
- Course: Permanent racing facility
- Course length: 2.5 miles (4.023 km)
- Distance: 200 laps, 500 mi (804.672 km)
- Weather: Temperatures reaching up to 73.9 °F (23.3 °C); wind speeds up to 10.2 miles per hour (16.4 km/h)
- Average speed: 132.626 miles per hour (213.441 km/h)

Pole position
Driver	Denny Hamlin	Joe Gibbs Racing
- Time: 52.995

Most laps led
Driver	Denny Hamlin	Joe Gibbs Racing
- Laps: 151

Winner
No. 11	Denny Hamlin	Joe Gibbs Racing

Television in the United States
- Network: TNT
- Announcers: Bill Weber, Wally Dallenbach Jr. and Benny Parsons

The 2006 Pennsylvania 500 was a NASCAR Nextel Cup Series race that was held on July 23, 2006, at Pocono Raceway in Long Pond, Pennsylvania. Contested over 200 laps on the 2.5-mile (4.0-kilometre) speedway, it was the 20th race of the 2006 NASCAR Nextel Cup Series.

Denny Hamlin of Joe Gibbs Racing won the race, taking his second victory of the season – and second at Pocono Raceway, having won the Pocono 500 the previous month.

== Qualifying ==
ST	Car #	Driver	Make	Primary Sponsor	SPD Q	Time	BHND
1	11	Denny Hamlin	Chevrolet	FedEx Kinkos	169.827	52.995	0.000
2	12	Ryan Newman	Dodge	Mobil 1	169.418	53.123	00.128
3	9	Kasey Kahne	Dodge	Dodge Dealers/UAW	169.345	53.146	00.151
4	25	Brian Vickers	Chevrolet	GMAC	169.310	53.157	00.162
5	24	Jeff Gordon	Chevrolet	DuPont	169.265	53.171	00.176
6	31	Jeff Burton	Chevrolet	Cingular Wireless	168.970	53.264	00.269
7	2	Kurt Busch	Dodge	Miller Lite	168.833	53.307	00.312
8	5	Kyle Busch	Chevrolet	Carquest	168.656	53.363	00.368
9	10	Scott Riggs	Dodge	Vavoline	168.580	53.387	00.392
10	01	Joe Nemechek	Chevrolet	U.S. Army	168.297	53.477	00.482
11	17	Matt Kenseth	Ford	DeWalt	168.284	53.481	00.486
12	29	Kevin Harvick	Chevrolet	GM Goodwrench	168.218	53.502	00.507
13	20	Tony Stewart	Chevrolet	Home Depot	168.001	53.571	00.576
14	07	Clint Bowyer	Chevrolet	Jack Daniels	167.992	53.574	00.579
15	48	Jimmie Johnson	Chevrolet	Lowe's	167.876	53.611	00.616
16	99	Carl Edwards	Ford	Office Depot	167.754	53.650	00.655
17	1	Martin Truex Jr	Chevrolet	Bass Pro Shops	167.645	53.685	00.690
18	21	Ken Schrader	Ford	U.S. Air Force	167.592	53.702	00.707
19	96	Tony Raines	Chevrolet	DLP HDTV	167.386	53.768	00.773
20	16	Greg Biffle	Ford	National Guard	167.352	53.779	00.784
21	18	JJ Yeley	Chevrolet	Interstate Batteries	167.106	53.858	00.863
22	19	Jeremy Mayfield	Dodge	Dodge Dealers/UAW	167.072	53.869	00.874
23	41	Reed Sorenson	Dodge	Target	166.895	53.926	00.931
24	22	Dave Blaney	Dodge	Caterpillar	166.880	53.931	00.936
25	38	Elliott Sadler	Ford	Combo's	166.756	53.971	00.976
26	8	Dale Earnhardt Jr	Chevrolet	Budweiser	166.682	53.995	01.000
27	43	Bobby Labonte	Dodge	Cheerios	166.664	54.001	01.006
28	26	Jamie McMurray	Ford	Crown Roya,	166.562	54.034	01.039
29	7	Robby Gordon	Chevrolet	Menards/Mapei	166.553	54.037	01.042
30	6	Mark Martin	Ford	AAA	166.236	54.140	01.145
31	42	Casey Mears	Dodge	Texaco/Havoline	166.171	54.161	01.166
32	66	Jeff Green	Chevrolet	Best Buy	166.076	54.192	01.197
33	45	Kyle Petty	Dodge	Petty Enterprises	165.997	54.218	01.223
34	49	Kevin Lepage	Dodge	LoansDepot.com	165.981	54.223	01.228
35	14	Sterling Marlin	Chevrolet	Ginn Clubs & Resorts	165.941	54.236	01.241
36	90	Stephen Leicht	Ford	Citi Financial	165.932	54.239	01.244
37	44	Terry Labonte	Chevrolet	Kellogg's	165.902	54.249	01.254
38	88	Dale Jarrett	Ford	UPS	165.432	54.403	01.408
39	55	Michael Waltrip	Dodge	NAPA Auto Parts	165.271	54.456	01.461
40	32	Travis Kvapil	Chevrolet	Tide	165.077	54.520	01.525
41	4	Scott Wimmer	Chevrolet	AERO Exhaust	164.483	54.717	01.722
42	40	David Stremme	Dodge	Lone Star Steakhouse	164.180	54.818	01.823
43	78	Jimmy Spencer	Chevrolet	Furniture Row Racing	164.165	54.823	01.828
Failed to qualify or withdrew
44	74	Derrike Cope	Dodge	Sundance Vacations / Fendler & Assoc.		54.988	
45	52	Stanton Barrett	Dodge	Pro30.com / Interush		55.332	
46	34	Greg Sacks	Chevrolet	Oak Glove Co.		55.879	
47	61	Chad Chaffin	Dodge	Hilton Garden Inn		54.264	
WD	04	Bobby Hamilton, Jr.	Dodge		0.000	0.000	0.000
WD	64	Damon Lusk	Chevrolet		0.000	0.000	0.000

== Results ==
POS	ST	#	DRIVER	SPONSOR / OWNER	CAR	LAPS	MONEY	STATUS	LED	PTS
1	1	11	Denny Hamlin	FedEx Kinko's (Joe Gibbs)	Chevrolet	200	230100	running	151	190
2	7	2	Kurt Busch	Miller Lite (Roger Penske)	Dodge	200	182758	running	4	175
3	5	24	Jeff Gordon	DuPont (Rick Hendrick)	Chevrolet	200	175961	running	3	170
4	4	25	Brian Vickers	GMAC (Rick Hendrick)	Chevrolet	200	117850	running	0	160
5	12	29	Kevin Harvick	GM Goodwrench (Richard Childress)	Chevrolet	200	134436	running	0	155
6	15	48	Jimmie Johnson	Lowe's (Rick Hendrick)	Chevrolet	200	133661	running	0	150
7	13	20	Tony Stewart	The Home Depot (Joe Gibbs)	Chevrolet	200	132461	running	0	146
8	27	43	Bobby Labonte	Cheerios / Betty Crocker (Petty Enterprises)	Dodge	200	122561	running	2	147
9	6	31	Jeff Burton	Cingular Wireless (Richard Childress)	Chevrolet	200	105720	running	23	143
10	17	1	Martin Truex, Jr.	Bass Pro Shops / Tracker (Dale Earnhardt, Inc.)	Chevrolet	200	105383	running	0	134
11	21	18	J.J. Yeley	Interstate Batteries (Joe Gibbs)	Chevrolet	200	110700	running	0	130
12	8	5	Kyle Busch	Carquest (Rick Hendrick)	Chevrolet	200	86275	running	0	127
13	29	7	Robby Gordon	Menards / MAPEI (Robby Gordon)	Chevrolet	200	74725	running	0	124
14	11	17	Matt Kenseth	DeWalt (Jack Roush)	Ford	200	113316	running	0	121
15	18	21	Ken Schrader	U.S. Air Force (Wood Brothers)	Ford	200	96939	running	1	123
16	24	22	Dave Blaney	Caterpillar (Bill Davis)	Dodge	200	84333	running	0	115
17	10	01	Joe Nemechek	U.S. Army (Nelson Bowers)	Chevrolet	200	94220	running	0	112
18	2	12	Ryan Newman	Mobil 1 (Roger Penske)	Dodge	200	109483	running	12	114
19	30	6	Mark Martin	AAA (Jack Roush)	Ford	200	81825	running	0	106
20	28	26	Jamie McMurray	Crown Royal (Jack Roush)	Ford	200	113225	running	0	103
21	19	96	Tony Raines	DLP HDTV (Bill Saunders)	Chevrolet	200	66875	running	0	100
22	9	10	Scott Riggs	Valvoline / Stanley Tools (James Rocco)	Dodge	200	66575	running	0	97
23	31	42	Casey Mears	Texaco / Havoline (Chip Ganassi)	Dodge	200	101333	running	0	94
24	20	16	Greg Biffle	National Guard (Jack Roush)	Ford	200	83000	running	0	91
25	37	44	Terry Labonte	Kellogg's (Rick Hendrick)	Chevrolet	200	62975	running	0	88
26	23	41	Reed Sorenson	Target (Chip Ganassi)	Dodge	200	73625	running	0	85
27	40	32	Travis Kvapil	Tide / Downy (Cal Wells)	Chevrolet	200	79533	running	0	82
28	38	88	Dale Jarrett	UPS (Yates Racing)	Ford	200	97200	running	3	84
29	42	40	David Stremme	Lone Star Steakhouse & Saloon (Chip Ganassi)	Dodge	199	84633	running	0	76
30	35	14	Sterling Marlin	Ginn Clubs & Resorts (Nelson Bowers)	Chevrolet	199	74372	running	0	73
31	3	9	Kasey Kahne	Dodge Dealers / UAW (Ray Evernham)	Dodge	199	98889	running	0	70
32	25	38	Elliott Sadler	Combos (Yates Racing)	Ford	199	89433	running	1	72
33	36	90	Stephen Leicht	CitiFinancial (Yates Racing)	Ford	199	62275	running	0	0
34	34	49	Kevin Lepage	LoansDepot.com / PoconoManor.com (Beth Ann Morgenthau)	Dodge	199	61125	running	0	61
35	32	66	Jeff Green	Haas Automation / Best Buy (Gene Haas)	Chevrolet	199	68975	running	0	58
36	43	78	Jimmy Spencer	Furniture Row Racing (Barney Visser)	Chevrolet	199	60750	running	0	55
37	22	19	Jeremy Mayfield	Dodge Dealers / UAW (Ray Evernham)	Dodge	199	90566	running	0	52
38	41	4	Scott Wimmer	AERO Exhaust (Larry McClure)	Chevrolet	196	60450	running	0	49
39	16	99	Carl Edwards	Office Depot (Jack Roush)	Ford	196	80125	running	0	46
40	39	55	Michael Waltrip	NAPA Auto Parts (Doug Bawel)	Dodge	195	60175	running	0	43
41	14	07	Clint Bowyer	Jack Daniel's (Richard Childress)	Chevrolet	194	68035	running	0	40
42	33	45	Kyle Petty	Kyle Petty Charity Ride (Petty Enterprises)	Dodge	117	67885	crash	0	37
43	26	8	Dale Earnhardt, Jr.	Budweiser (Dale Earnhardt, Inc.)	Chevrolet	115	95088	crash	0	34
Failed to qualify, withdrew, or driver changes:
POS	NAME	NBR	SPONSOR	OWNER	CAR					
44	Derrike Cope	74	Sundance Vacations / Fendler & Assoc.	Raynard McGlynn	Dodge					
45	Stanton Barrett	52	Pro30.com / Interush	Rick Ware	Dodge					
46	Greg Sacks	34	Oak Glove Co.	Bob Jenkins	Chevrolet					
47	Chad Chaffin	61	Hilton Garden Inn	Jeff Stec	Dodge					
WD	Bobby Hamilton, Jr.	04		Bobby Hamilton Racing	Dodge					
WD	Damon Lusk	64		Dan Kinney	Chevrolet					

== Race statistics ==
- Time of race: 3:46:12
- Average speed: 132.626 miles per hour (213.441 km/h)
- Pole speed: 169.827 miles per hour (273.310 km/h)
- Cautions: 7 for 29 laps
- Margin of victory: 1.510 seconds
- Lead changes: 13
- Percent of race run under caution: 14.5%
- Average green flag run: 21.4 laps

Previous race: 2006 Lenox Industrial Tools 300	Nextel Cup Series; 2006 season	Next race: 2006 Allstate 400 at the Brickyard
