= Dale Jarrett =

American racing driver (born 1956)

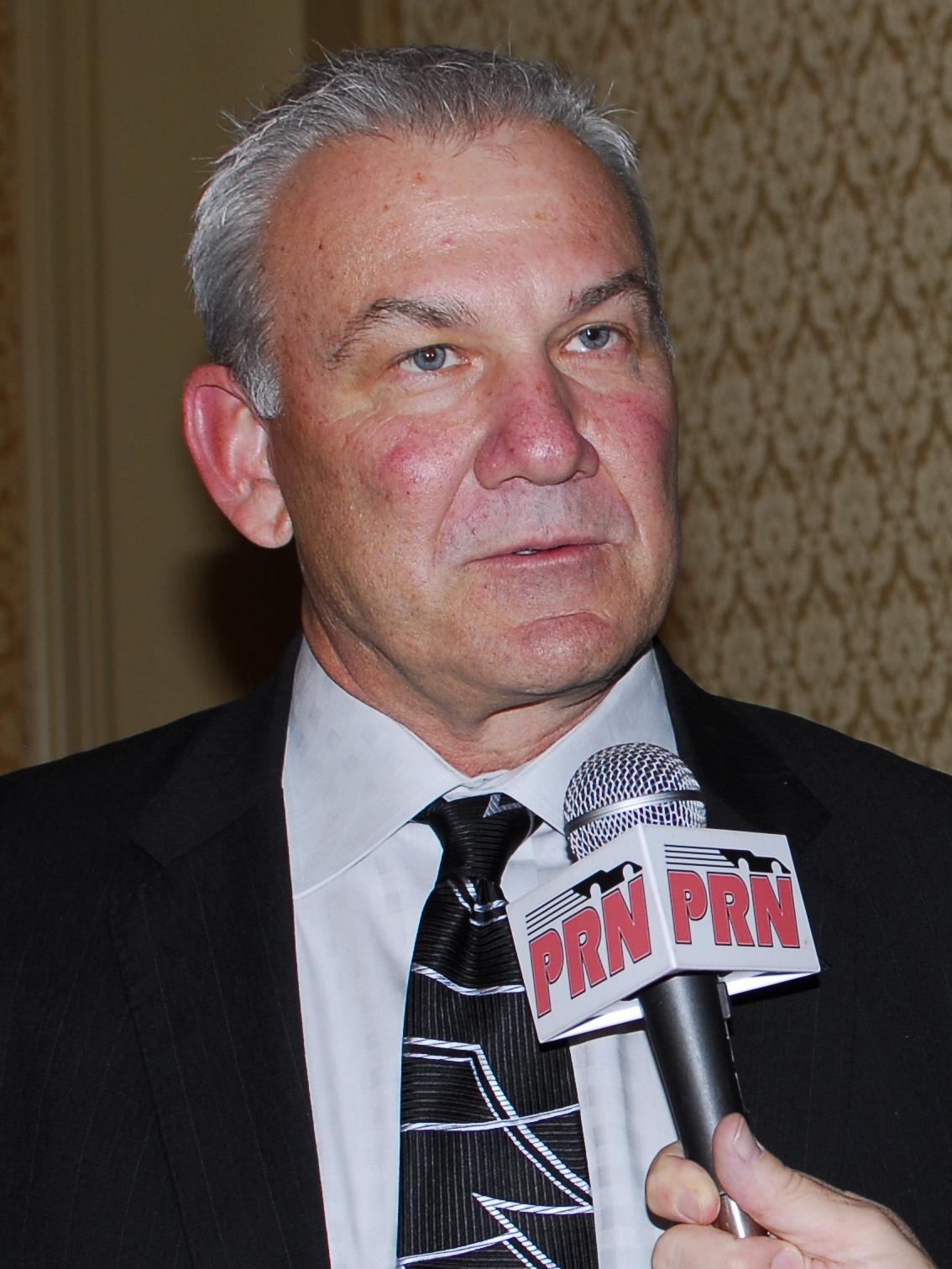
- Jarrett in 2011
- Born: Dale Arnold Jarrett; November 26, 1956 (age 69); Conover, North Carolina, U.S.
- Achievements: 1999 Winston Cup Series Champion; 1993, 1996, 2000 Daytona 500 Winner; 1996, 1999 Brickyard 400 Winner; 1996 Coca-Cola 600 Winner; 1998 Winston 500 Winner; 1996, 2000, 2004 Budweiser Shootout Winner
- Awards: Named one of NASCAR's 50 Greatest Drivers (1998); 2004 USG Person of the Year Award; NASCAR Hall of Fame (2014); Named one of NASCAR's 75 Greatest Drivers (2023)

NASCAR Cup Series career
- 668 races run over 24 years
- Best finish: 1st (1999)
- First race: 1984 Sovran Bank 500 (Martinsville)
- Last race: 2008 Food City 500 (Bristol)
- First win: 1991 Champion Spark Plug 400 (Michigan)
- Last win: 2005 UAW-Ford 500 (Talladega)
| Wins | Top tens | Poles |
|---|---|---|
| 32 | 260 | 16 |

NASCAR O'Reilly Auto Parts Series career
- 329 races run over 20 years
- Best finish: 4th (1984, 1986)
- First race: 1982 Goody's 300 (Daytona)
- Last race: 2007 Food City 250 (Bristol)
- First win: 1986 L.D. Swain 150 (Rougemont)
- Last win: 1995 Jiffy Lube Miami 300 (Homestead)
| Wins | Top tens | Poles |
|---|---|---|
| 11 | 173 | 14 |
- Statistics up to date as of December 20, 2012.

Dale Arnold Jarrett (born November 26, 1956) is an American former race car driver and current racing commentator for NBC. He is best known for winning the Daytona 500 three times (in 1993, 1996, and 2000) and winning the NASCAR Winston Cup Series championship in 1999. He is the son of two-time Grand National Champion Ned Jarrett, younger brother of Glenn Jarrett, father of former driver Jason Jarrett, and cousin of Todd Jarrett. In 2007, Jarrett joined the ESPN/ABC broadcasting team as an announcer in select Nationwide Series races. In 2008, after retiring from driving following the 2008 Food City 500, he joined ESPN permanently as the lead racing analyst replacing Rusty Wallace. In 2015, Jarrett became a part of the NBC Sports Broadcasting Crew for NASCAR events. He was inducted in the 2014 class of the NASCAR Hall of Fame and the Motorsports Hall of Fame of America in 2025.

== Early life and education ==
Jarrett was born on November 26, 1956, in Conover, North Carolina, the middle child of Ned and Martha. Jarrett has an older brother, Glenn; and a younger sister, Patti. Jarrett's father Ned competed in the NASCAR Grand National Division between 1953 and 1966, winning two series championships in 1961 and 1965. Following retirement, Ned remained active in the racing community as manager of Hickory Motor Speedway and later established a career in broadcasting calling Cup races.

Jarrett spent his childhood traveling to his father's races across the Southern United States. He was introduced to golf by the age of twelve; he also played football, basketball and baseball while attending Newton-Conover High School. Jarrett led his high school's golf team to three conference championships, and was named the school's athlete of the year as a senior. Following graduation in 1975, Jarrett worked at Hickory Motor Speedway, the track his father managed. Jarrett was offered a full golf scholarship from the University of South Carolina, which he declined. Though he continued to play golf, Jarrett was interested in following his father's footsteps as a racing driver.

== Racing career ==
=== Beginnings ===
In April 1977, Jarrett entered his first professional race in the Limited Sportsman Division in Hickory. His vehicle, a 1968 Chevrolet Nova, was built by Andy Petree and Jimmy Newsome. Jarrett started last and finished 9th; it was after this event when Jarrett knew that he wanted to race for a living. Jarrett continued to compete in the Limited Sportsman Division for two years, before moving up to the Dash Series and then the Late Model Sportsman Division, the latter in which he earned his first victory.

=== 1982–1986 ===
Jarrett competed in the 1982 NASCAR Budweiser Late Model Sportsman Series for car owner Horace Isenhower. He earned fourteen Top 10 finishes throughout the season, with a best of third-place at Hickory; and he finished 6th in points. During the 1983 season, Jarrett earned four poles and seventeen Top 5's, finishing 5th in the point standings. For the 1984 Busch Grand National Series, Jarrett received sponsorship from Econo Lodge; Valvoline; and Budweiser. He earned six front-row starts and nineteen Top 10's, finishing a career-best 4th in the point standings. Jarrett made his Winston Cup Series debut during the 1984 season. Driving the No. 02 Chevrolet for Emanuel Zervakis at Martinsville Speedway, Jarrett qualified 24th and finished 14th. He made two more Cup starts that season, at the Firecracker 400 for Jimmy Means, and the Warner W. Hodgdon American 500. During the 1986 Busch Grand National Series, Jarrett earned his first career victory at Orange County Speedway in Rougemont, North Carolina; piloting the Nationwise Auto Parts Pontiac to victory lane. He also earned six poles in 1986.

=== 1987–1991 ===
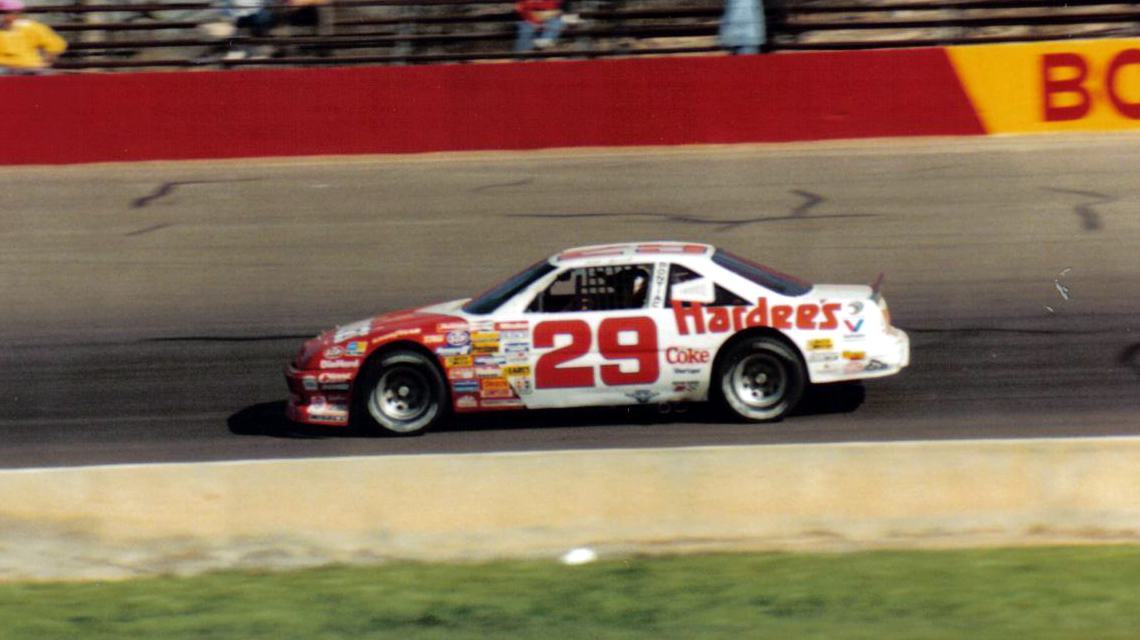
1989 racecar

Jarrett earned his second career victory in the Busch Grand National Series at Hickory during the 1987 season. In the Winston Cup Series, Jarrett replaced Tommy Ellis in the No. 18 Chevrolet owned by Eric Freelander early in the season. Running a primarily-unsponsored car, he had two 10th-place finishes and ended the season 26th in points, second to Davey Allison for Rookie of the Year honors. He ran every race of the 1988 season, despite running with various teams. He made most of his starts in the No. 29 Hardee's Oldsmobile owned by Cale Yarborough, finishing 8th at Riverside International Raceway. He also ran races for Buddy Arrington and Hoss Ellington that season, finishing 23rd in the final standings. He ran the entire season for Yarborough in 1989, posting five Top 10 finishes, including two 5th-place runs. Jarrett enjoyed the majority of his success in the Busch Series during the 1990 and 1991 seasons. Led by crew chief John Ervin and engine builder Ron Hutter, Jarrett scored victories at Bristol, Charlotte, Rockingham, and Darlington (twice). Jarrett began 1990 without a Cup ride before taking over the No. 21 Citgo Ford Thunderbird for Wood Brothers Racing at the Valleydale Meats 500, replacing the injured Neil Bonnett. He finished in the Top 10 seven times during the season and finished 25th in the final standings despite missing the first five races of the season. The following season, Jarrett won his first career Winston Cup race at Michigan International Speedway, and finished a then career-best 17th in the final points standings.

=== 1992–1998 ===
Despite the win, Jarrett left Wood Brothers to drive the No. 18 Interstate Batteries Chevrolet for the fledgling Joe Gibbs Racing team. In their first year of competition, Jarrett had two Top 5 finishes but dropped to 19th in points. In 1993, Jarrett won the Daytona 500 after battling Dale Earnhardt (commonly referred to as "The Dale and Dale Show"). While Jarrett did not win again that season, he had a total of thirteen Top 5's and finished 4th in the final standings. During the spring race at Bristol, Jarrett threw his helmet at the No. 90 car of Bobby Hillin Jr. who crashed Jarrett while he had been lapped. The next season, Jarrett won the Mello Yello 500, but chose to step down from the Gibbs organization at the end of the season. Jarrett signed to drive for Robert Yates in 1995, piloting the No. 28 Texaco Ford in place of an injured Ernie Irvan at the Winston Cup level. His Busch Series team also made the switch to Ford as well. With engines provided by Yates and sponsorship from Mac Tools, Jarrett scored four Busch Series wins during the season. However, only three of the wins counted. His win at Michigan was disqualified due to an unapproved engine part.

He won his first Cup race for Yates at Pocono Raceway and finished 13th in the final standings. When it was announced Irvan (who had returned toward the end of the year in a Texaco Havoline Yates car numbered 88) would return to the No. 28 after a year-long absence due to injuries, Yates had planned to help Jarrett compete in his own team with a Hooters sponsorship. The deal fell through, however, and Yates promoted the No. 88 car to full-time in the Winston Cup Series with Ford assuming the sponsorship through its Quality Care Service and Ford Credit divisions. In 1996, Jarrett won the Daytona 500 for a second time, and finished in the Top 2 in each of the first three races of the season. He also won the Coca-Cola 600, Brickyard 400, and the second Michigan race. Jarrett finished 3rd in the final point standings behind Hendrick Motorsports teammates Terry Labonte and Jeff Gordon. Jarrett's kissing of the bricks at Indianapolis started a tradition that has been used by every NASCAR team at the race since then and in the Indianapolis 500 since 2003.

The following season, he won a career-best seven races but lost the championship to Jeff Gordon by 14 points. In 1998, Jarrett won three races, and finished 2nd in the last two races of the year, ending up 3rd in the final point standings to Jeff Gordon, despite suffering gallbladder problems, which made him miss the exhibition race in Japan. After an offseason surgery, Jarrett returned in 1999 and took the points lead after his first win of the season at the Pontiac Excitement 400 and held it for the rest of the season, when he won The Winston Cup title by 201 points over Bobby Labonte with four wins (Richmond, Michigan, Daytona, and Indianapolis), 24 Top 5's, a then Modern Era record 29 Top 10's, and an average 6.76 finish. He also retired from the Busch Series to become a part-time owner, partnering with National Football League quarterback Brett Favre to field the No. 11 Rayovac Ford for his son Jason, Yates teammate Kenny Irwin Jr., and Steve Grissom. He had eleven wins in the Busch Series when he retired.

=== 2000–2005 ===
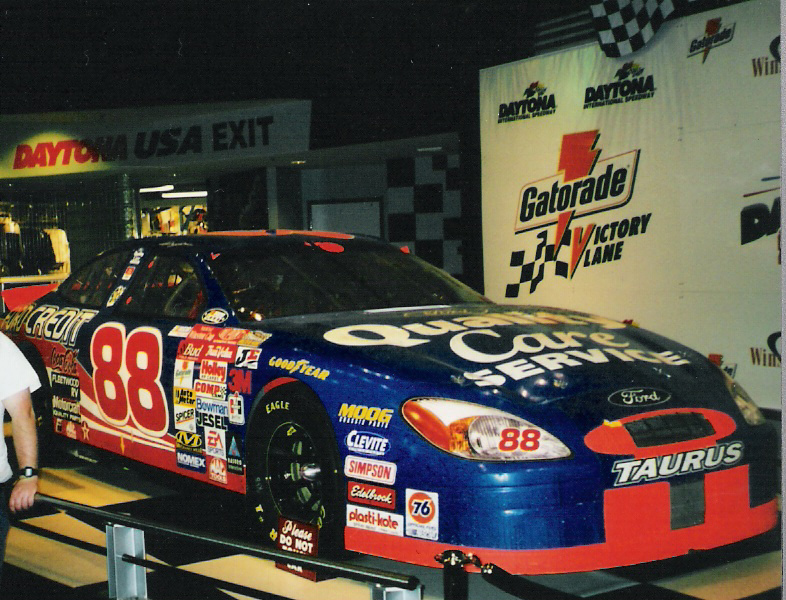
Dale Jarrett's 2000 Daytona 500 winning car on display at Daytona USA, taken January 2001

Following his title in 1999, Jarrett won the Daytona 500 for the third time in 2000; however, after only winning one other race and dropping to 4th in the standings, Ford elected to withdraw as the primary sponsor (although Ford Credit remained as the secondary). United Parcel Service (UPS) was signed as the primary sponsor for Jarrett and shortly thereafter, UPS began a multi-year promotional campaign involving the company trying to convince him to drive their trademark "Big Brown Truck" in a race.

In 2001, he won three of the first eight races of the season (Darlington, Texas, and Martinsville) and traded the points lead with Jeff Gordon, with the two of them having the same point totals for a few different weeks, but won only once more at New Hampshire in July and faded back to 5th in the standings. In addition, Jarrett suffered a concussion from a hard crash at the new Kansas Speedway. In an interview, Jarrett said that he did remember not being in the Protection One 400 but only getting on the plane to go to the racetrack. After that season, Jarrett's long-time crew chief Todd Parrott departed and Jimmy Elledge took over the role as a replacement. After seven races of the 2002 season, Jarrett and Parrott reunited, and Jarrett went on to clinch two victories (Pocono and Michigan) and rebounded to 9th in the final standings after the poor start to the year.

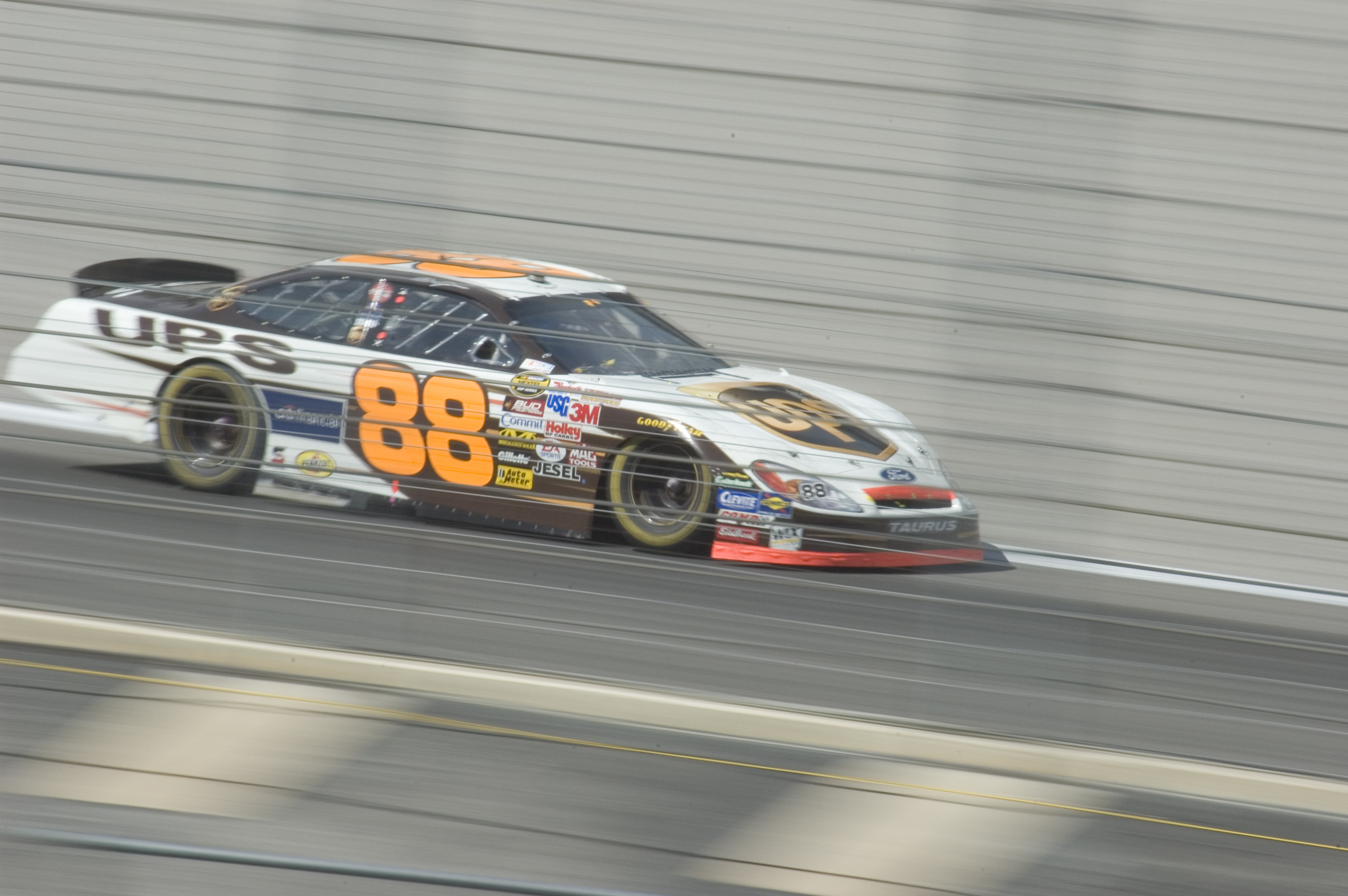
Jarrett competing in the 2005 Samsung/Radio Shack 500 at the Texas Motor Speedway

Jarrett began the 2003 season by winning at North Carolina Speedway but only posted five more Top 10 finishes, relegating him to 26th in the final standings. He rebounded in 2004 to finish 15th in points, despite not winning a race for the first time since 1992. In 2005, Jarrett had an up-and-down year in 2005. In the Busch Series Bristol race, he was involved in a crash with Shane Hmiel. When Jarrett confronted him under a red flag, Hmiel flipped him off drawing a fine from NASCAR. Jarrett was not penalized for any part he had in the wreck. Later, Jarrett got his last career Cup series win at Talladega Superspeedway, again finishing 15th in the standings.

=== 2006–2008 ===
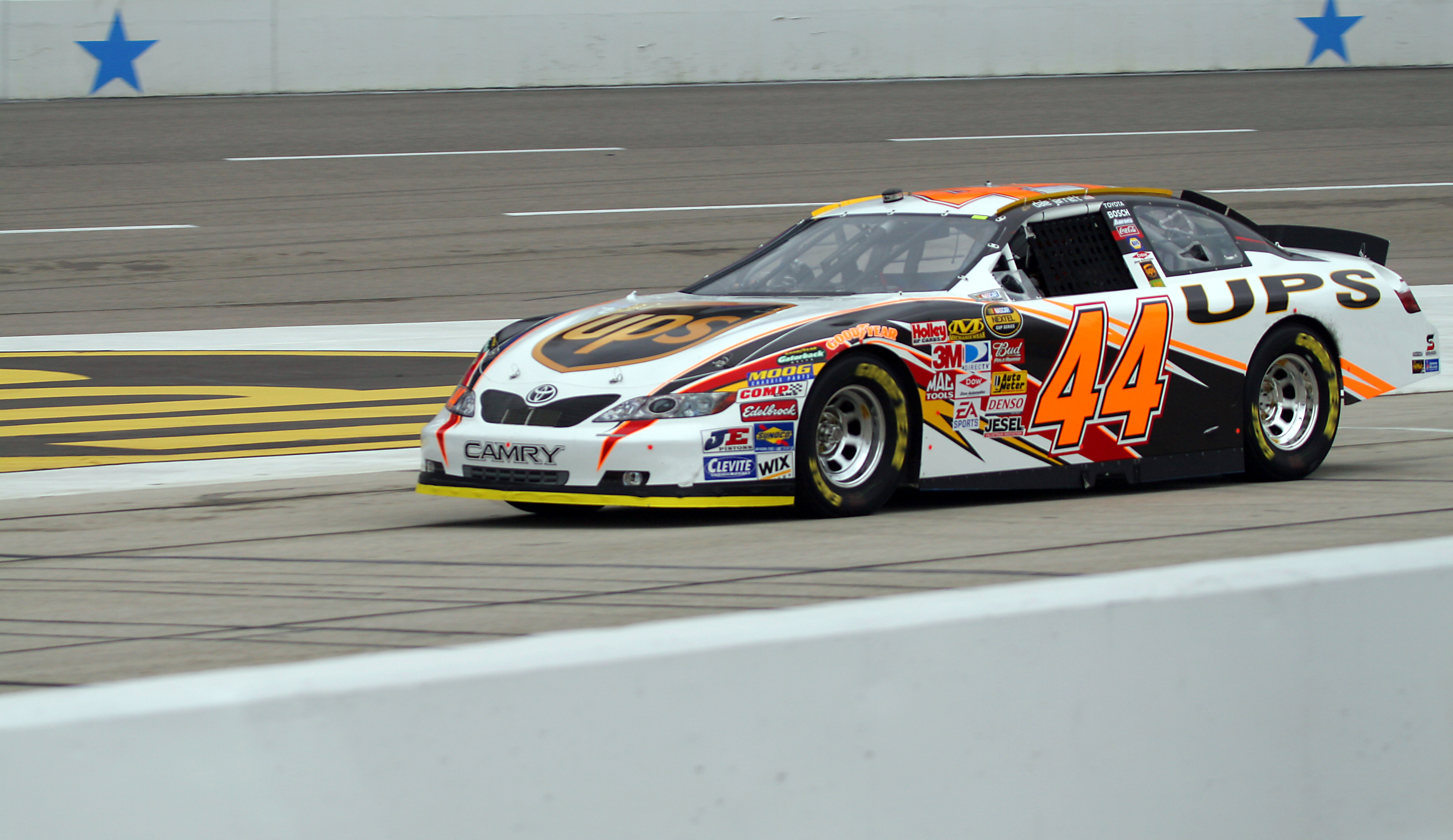
Jarrett coming to pit road at Texas Motor Speedway in 2007

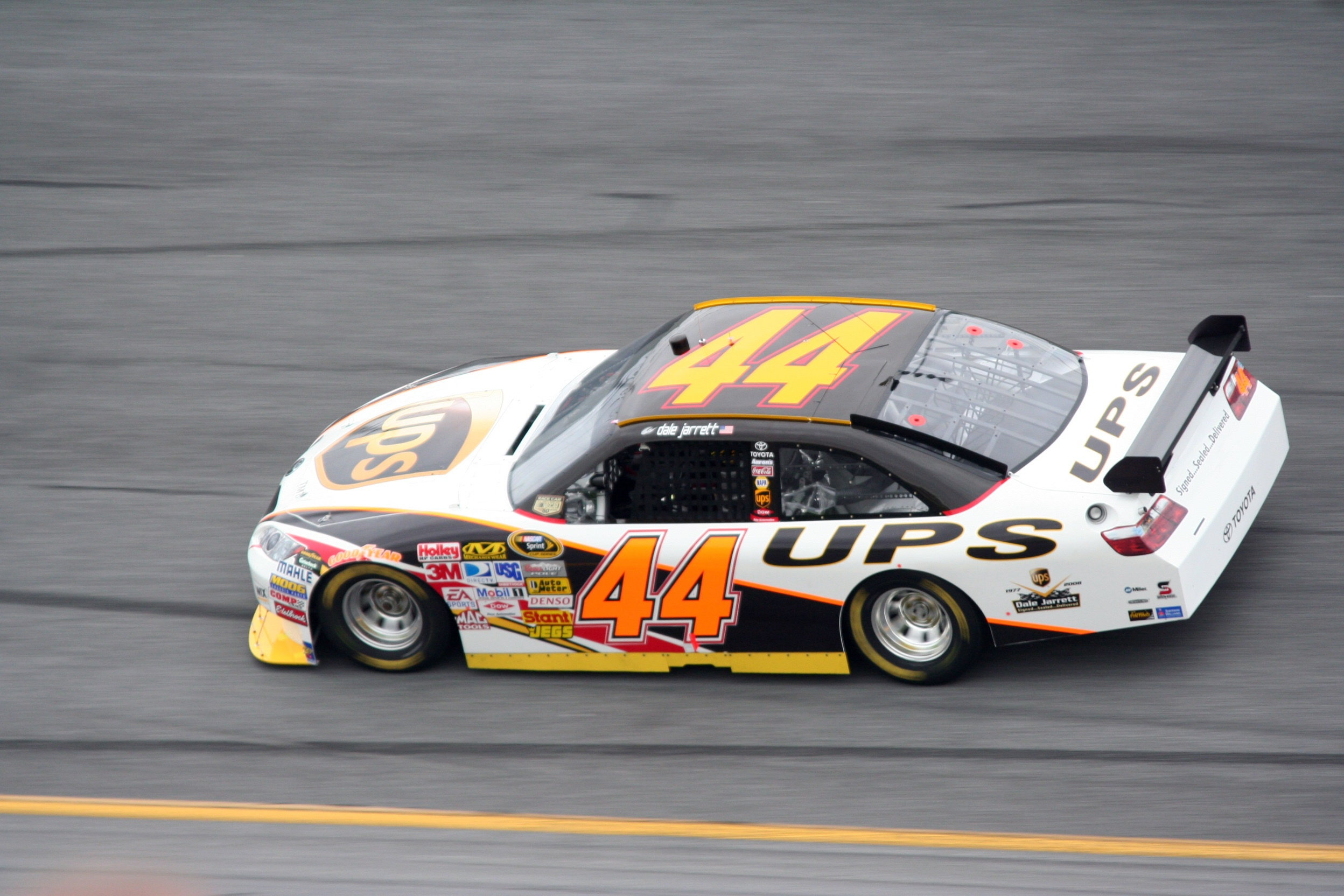
Jarrett's No. 44 car at Daytona International Speedway in 2008

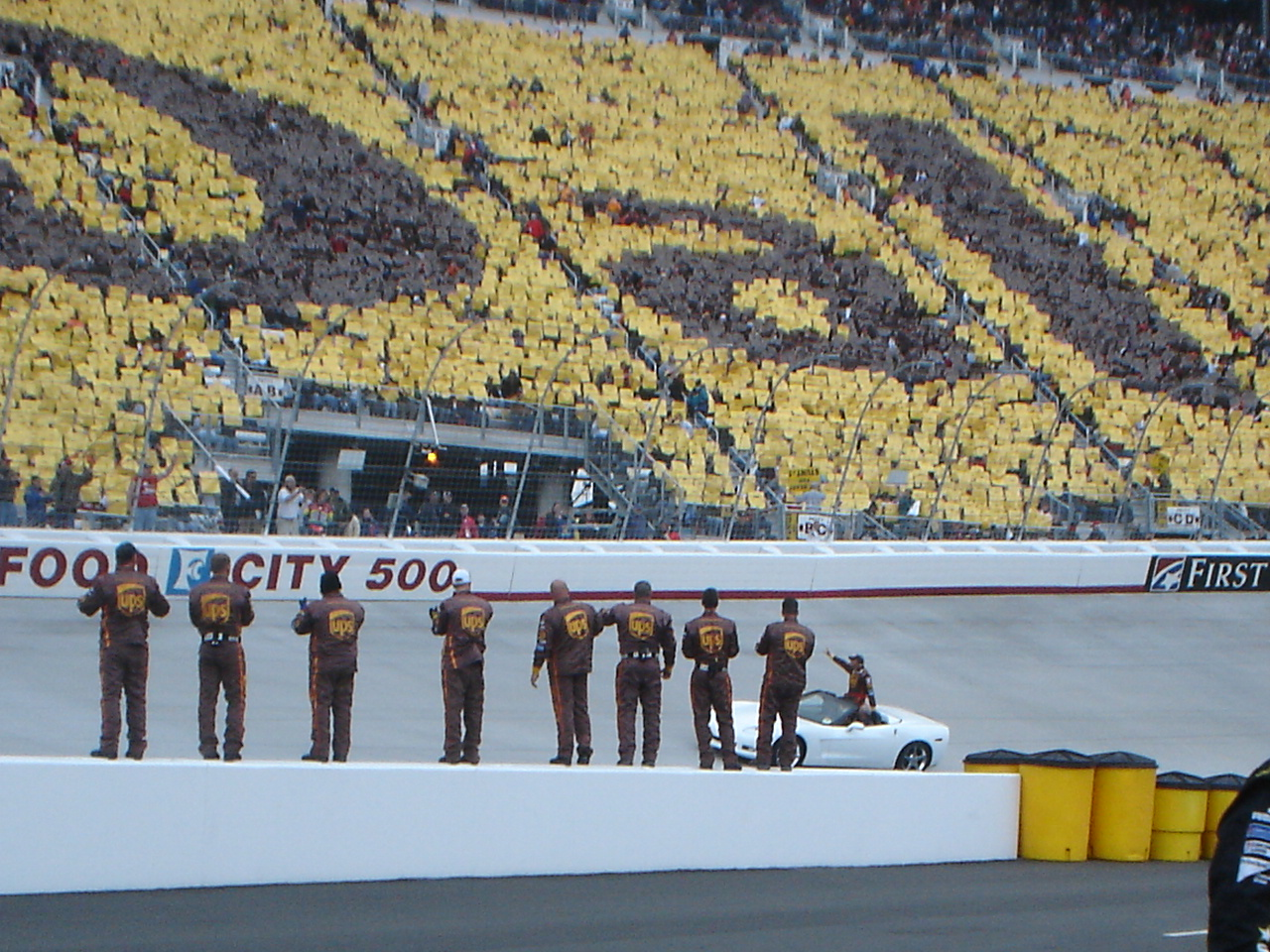
Jarrett on a parade lap before his final points race as fans and crew applaud him

During the 2006 season, Jarrett had four Top 10 finishes, with a best finish of 4th at Kansas. His best starting position was 2nd and he finished 23rd in points. It was his last year racing for Yates, as he and his sponsor UPS left for Michael Waltrip Racing's new No. 44 Toyota team.

Jarrett started the 2007 Nextel Cup season on a high note as he drew pole position for the annual exhibition race, the Budweiser Shootout, at Daytona. He finished 18th out of 21 cars. Since Jarrett's team was a brand new team and had no owner points, and due to a rule change, he was eligible to use the Past Champion's Provisional five times as his 1999 championship was the most recent among past champions who were driving for teams not in the Top 35 in owner points; prior to the rule change the use of a Past Champion's Provisional was not limited.

Jarrett was forced to use all six of his provisionals at the start of the season, starting at Daytona mainly because Michael Waltrip Racing was penalized by NASCAR for an illegal fuel additive during Speedweeks and the penalties knocked Jarrett, Waltrip, and Reutimann out of the Top 35 in owner points-the safety net for qualifying regardless of rain and cancellations of qualifying.

Jarrett started 43rd in the Daytona 500 and finished 22nd. Jarrett used his last champion's provisional at the spring Talladega race, Aaron's 499. For the rest of 2007, Jarrett had to get into that weekend's race on time. Jarrett missed twelve races in 2007 as a result.

During an interview on Speed, Jarrett said after his contract is up with MWR (which was expected to be in the 2009 season), he would retire, but the timetable was pushed up in October 2007 prior to the 2007 Bank of America 500. Jarrett retired from points racing after the 2008 Food City 500, turning the No. 44 Toyota ride to David Reutimann. His final race was the All-Star race on May 17, 2008, after which he joined ESPN's NASCAR coverage full-time as a booth announcer.

However, Jarrett was not guaranteed to start the first five races using the champion's provisional as he had the year before as Kurt Busch, the 2004 champion, had his team's owner points transferred to his teammate Sam Hornish Jr. and would be first to receive it. Jarrett started off 2008 with a sixteenth place finish at Daytona. He retired from points racing after the Food City 500 at Bristol Motor Speedway. At the weekend's pre-race driver's meeting, he spoke to the other drivers, saying

Enjoy this. We all have our time in this, and mine has been fantastic. To me, it has been an honor and a privilege to be able to race in this series and say I raced with and against and sometimes beat the best in the world. Thanks for allowing me to do that. Enjoy it. It's a great sport, and you guys make it what it is.

== Awards and honors ==
- 1997, 1999 Richard Petty Driver of the Year
- 1998 NASCAR's 50 Greatest Drivers
- 2000 Best Driver ESPY Award recipient
- 2014 NASCAR Hall of Fame inductee
- Named one of NASCAR's 75 Greatest Drivers (2023)

== Motorsports career results ==
=== NASCAR ===
(key) (Bold – Pole position awarded by qualifying time. Italics – Pole position earned by points standings or practice time. * – Most laps led.)

==== Cup Series ====
NASCAR Cup Series results
| Year | Team | No. | Make | 1 | 2 | 3 | 4 | 5 | 6 | 7 | 8 | 9 | 10 | 11 | 12 | 13 | 14 | 15 | 16 | 17 | 18 | 19 | 20 | 21 | 22 | 23 | 24 | 25 | 26 | 27 | 28 | 29 | 30 | 31 | 32 | 33 | 34 | 35 | 36 | NSCC | Pts | Ref |
|---|---|---|---|---|---|---|---|---|---|---|---|---|---|---|---|---|---|---|---|---|---|---|---|---|---|---|---|---|---|---|---|---|---|---|---|---|---|---|---|---|---|---|
| 1984 | Zervakis Enterprises | 02 | Chevy | DAY | RCH | CAR | ATL | BRI | NWS | DAR | MAR; 14 | TAL | NSV | DOV | CLT | RSD | POC | MCH | | | | | | | | | | | | | CAR; 37 | ATL | RSD | | | | | | | 72nd | – | |
| 1984 | Jimmy Means Racing | 52 | Pontiac | | | | | | | | | | | | | | | | DAY; 23 | NSV | POC | TAL | MCH | BRI | DAR | RCH | DOV | MAR | CLT | NWS | | | | | | | | | | 72nd | – | |
| 1986 | Curb Racing | 98 | Pontiac | DAY | RCH | CAR | ATL | BRI | DAR | NWS | MAR | TAL | DOV | CLT | RSD | POC | MCH | DAY | POC | TAL | GLN | MCH | BRI; 29 | DAR | RCH | DOV | MAR | NWS | CLT | CAR | ATL | RSD | | | | | | | | 107th | 76 | |
| 1987 | Freelander Motorsports | 18 | Chevy | DAY | CAR | RCH | ATL | DAR | NWS; 12 | BRI; 10 | MAR; 29 | TAL; 28 | CLT; 38 | DOV; 35 | POC; 35 | RSD; 18 | MCH; 20 | DAY; 23 | POC; 12 | TAL; 21 | GLN; 36 | MCH; 39 | BRI; 12 | DAR; 15 | RCH; 27 | DOV; 38 | MAR; 10 | NWS; 18 | CLT; 34 | CAR; 16 | RSD; 17 | ATL; 36 | | | | | | | | 26th | 1840 | |
| 1988 | Ellington Racing | 1 | Buick | DAY; 16 | | | ATL; DNQ | | | | | TAL; 11 | | | | | MCH; 25 | DAY; 14 | | TAL; 37 | | MCH; 41 | | | | | | CLT; 37 | | | | ATL; 41 | | | | | | | | 23rd | 2622 | |
| 1988 | Cale Yarborough Motorsports | 29 | Olds | | RCH; 26 | CAR; 16 | | DAR; 12 | BRI; 28 | NWS; 21 | MAR; 13 | | | DOV; 20 | RSD; 8 | POC; 13 | | | POC; 25 | | GLN; 11 | | BRI; 26 | DAR; 34 | RCH; 15 | DOV; 28 | MAR; 32 | | NWS; 23 | CAR; 32 | PHO; 31 | | | | | | | | | 23rd | 2622 | |
| 1988 | Ball Racing | 99 | Chevy | | | | ATL; 29 | | | | | | | | | | | | | | | | | | | | | | | | | | | | | | | | | 23rd | 2622 | |
| 1988 | Arrington Racing | 67 | Chevy | | | | | | | | | | CLT; 41 | | | | | | | | | | | | | | | | | | | | | | | | | | | 23rd | 2622 | |
| 1989 | Cale Yarborough Motorsports | 29 | Pontiac | DAY; 32 | CAR; 11 | ATL; 9 | RCH; 23 | DAR; 40 | BRI; 22 | NWS; 19 | MAR; 15 | TAL; 40 | CLT; 28 | DOV; 11 | SON; 42 | POC; 7 | MCH; 22 | DAY; 31 | POC; 18 | TAL; 23 | GLN; 23 | MCH; 38 | BRI; 10 | DAR; 20 | RCH; 35 | DOV; 23 | MAR; 5 | CLT; 24 | NWS; 27 | CAR; 39 | PHO; 5 | ATL; 16 | | | | | | | | 24th | 2789 | |
| 1990 | Wood Brothers Racing | 21 | Ford | DAY | RCH | CAR | ATL | DAR | BRI; 11 | NWS; 14 | MAR; 30 | TAL; 34 | CLT; 32 | DOV; 12 | SON; 14 | POC; 31 | MCH; 34 | DAY; 8 | POC; 18 | TAL; 39 | GLN; 20 | MCH; 10 | BRI; 7 | DAR; 28 | RCH; 29 | DOV; 6 | MAR; 10 | NWS; 19 | CLT; 10 | CAR; 16 | PHO; 30 | ATL; 4 | | | | | | | | 25th | 2558 | |
| 1991 | Wood Brothers Racing | 21 | Ford | DAY; 6 | RCH; 21 | CAR; 11 | ATL; 20 | DAR; 39 | BRI; 7 | NWS; 25 | MAR; 12 | TAL; 35 | CLT; 5 | DOV; 35 | SON; 41 | POC; 19 | MCH; 12 | DAY; 18 | POC; 6 | TAL; 8 | GLN; 5 | MCH; 1 | BRI; 28 | DAR; 25 | RCH; 20 | DOV; 34 | MAR; 18 | NWS; 9 | CLT; 26 | CAR; 25 | PHO; 35 | ATL; 16 | | | | | | | | 17th | 3124 | |
| 1992 | Joe Gibbs Racing | 18 | Chevy | DAY; 36 | CAR; 37 | RCH; 13 | ATL; 11 | DAR; 21 | BRI; 2 | NWS; 17 | MAR; 28 | TAL; 7 | CLT; 12 | DOV; 27 | SON; 39 | POC; 22 | MCH; 24 | DAY; 3 | POC; 10 | TAL; 21 | GLN; 15 | MCH; 8 | BRI; 17 | DAR; 6 | RCH; 25 | DOV; 12 | MAR; 23 | NWS; 10 | CLT; 24 | CAR; 15 | PHO; 20 | ATL; 10 | | | | | | | | 19th | 3251 | |
| 1993 | Joe Gibbs Racing | 18 | Chevy | DAY; 1 | CAR; 6 | RCH; 4 | ATL; 31 | DAR; 3 | BRI; 32 | NWS; 32 | MAR; 3 | TAL; 3 | SON; 13 | CLT; 3 | DOV; 2 | POC; 19 | MCH; 4 | DAY; 8 | NHA; 4 | POC; 8 | TAL; 5 | GLN; 32 | MCH; 4 | BRI; 31 | DAR; 12 | RCH; 14 | DOV; 4 | MAR; 5 | NWS; 9 | CLT; 26 | CAR; 30 | PHO; 16 | ATL; 7 | | | | | | | 4th | 4000 | |
| 1994 | Joe Gibbs Racing | 18 | Chevy | DAY; 35 | CAR; 18 | RCH; 10 | ATL; 35 | DAR; 4 | BRI; 36 | NWS; 25 | MAR; 21 | TAL; 21 | SON; 12 | CLT; 4 | DOV; 29 | POC; 20 | MCH; 14 | DAY; 11 | NHA; 14 | POC; 10 | TAL; 39 | IND; 40 | GLN; 11 | MCH; 30 | BRI; 26 | DAR; 9 | RCH; 16 | DOV; 34 | MAR; 5 | NWS; DNQ | CLT; 1 | CAR; 12 | PHO; 9 | ATL; 9 | | | | | | 16th | 3298 | |
| 1995 | Robert Yates Racing | 28 | Ford | **DAY**; 5 | CAR; 5 | RCH; 25 | ATL; 5 | DAR; 38 | BRI; 6 | NWS; 11 | MAR; 7 | TAL; 19 | SON; 23 | CLT; 32 | DOV; 40 | POC; 38 | MCH; 6 | DAY; 42 | NHA; 30 | POC; 1 | TAL; 2 | IND; 3 | GLN; 17 | MCH; 33 | BRI; 3* | DAR; 28 | RCH; 4 | DOV; 30 | MAR; 10 | NWS; 7 | CLT; 5 | CAR; 23 | PHO; 11 | ATL; 31 | | | | | | 13th | 3584 | |
| 1996 | Robert Yates Racing | 88 | Ford | DAY; 1 | CAR; 2 | RCH; 2 | ATL; 11 | DAR; 15 | BRI; 6 | NWS; 11 | MAR; 29 | TAL; 2 | SON; 12 | CLT; 1* | DOV; 36 | POC; 38 | MCH; 10 | DAY; 6 | NHA; 2 | POC; 3 | TAL; 2 | IND; 1 | GLN; 24 | MCH; 1 | BRI; 4 | **DAR**; 14 | RCH; 4 | DOV; 3 | MAR; 16 | NWS; 3 | CLT; 3 | **CAR**; 2* | PHO; 8 | ATL; 2 | | | | | | 3rd | 4568 | |
| 1997 | Robert Yates Racing | 88 | Ford | DAY; 23 | CAR; 2* | RCH; 3* | ATL; 1* | **DAR**; 1* | TEX; 2 | BRI; 4 | MAR; 16 | SON; 4 | TAL; 35 | CLT; 27 | DOV; 32* | POC; 3 | **MCH**; 6 | CAL; 8 | DAY; 5 | NHA; 38 | POC; 1* | IND; 3 | GLN; 32 | MCH; 5 | BRI; 1* | DAR; 3 | RCH; 1 | NHA; 6 | DOV; 5 | MAR; 12 | CLT; 1 | TAL; 21 | CAR; 2 | PHO; 1 | ATL; 2 | | | | | 2nd | 4696 | |
| 1998 | Robert Yates Racing | 88 | Ford | DAY; 34 | CAR; 7 | **LVS**; 40 | ATL; 2 | DAR; 1 | BRI; 3 | TEX; 11 | MAR; 3 | TAL; 3 | CAL; 41 | CLT; 5 | DOV; 1 | RCH; 2* | MCH; 2 | POC; 3 | SON; 15 | NHA; 7 | POC; 5 | IND; 16 | GLN; 5 | MCH; 3 | BRI; 4 | NHA; 4 | **DAR**; 3 | RCH; 16 | DOV; 7 | MAR; 42 | CLT; 24 | TAL; 1 | DAY; 23 | PHO; 32 | CAR; 2* | ATL; 2 | | | | 3rd | 4619 | |
| 1999 | Robert Yates Racing | 88 | Ford | DAY; 37 | CAR; 2 | LVS; 11 | ATL; 5 | DAR; 4 | TEX; 2 | BRI; 3 | MAR; 8 | TAL; 2 | CAL; 5 | RCH; 1 | CLT; 5 | DOV; 5 | MCH; 1* | POC; 3* | SON; 6 | DAY; 1 | NHA; 4 | POC; 2 | IND; 1* | GLN; 4 | MCH; 4 | BRI; 38 | DAR; 16 | RCH; 3 | NHA; 18 | DOV; 3 | MAR; 10 | CLT; 7 | TAL; 2 | CAR; 4* | PHO; 6 | HOM; 5 | ATL; 2 | | | 1st | 5262 | |
| 2000 | Robert Yates Racing | 88 | Ford | **DAY**; 1* | CAR; 5 | LVS; 7 | **ATL**; 36 | DAR; 2 | BRI; 21 | TEX; 33 | MAR; 5 | TAL; 17 | CAL; 9 | RCH; 3 | CLT; 5 | DOV; 4 | MCH; 4 | POC; 2 | SON; 7 | **DAY**; 2* | NHA; 7 | POC; 4* | IND; 7 | GLN; 7 | MCH; 4 | BRI; 9 | DAR; 5 | RCH; 31 | NHA; 4 | DOV; 32 | MAR; 6 | CLT; 40 | TAL; 15 | CAR; 1 | PHO; 10 | HOM; 17 | ATL; 15 | | | 4th | 4684 | |
| 2001 | Robert Yates Racing | 88 | Ford | DAY; 22 | CAR; 10 | **LVS**; 2 | **ATL**; 4 | DAR; 1 | BRI; 16 | TEX; 1* | MAR; 1 | TAL; 18 | CAL; 24 | RCH; 15 | CLT; 8 | DOV; 5 | MCH; 18 | POC; 3 | SON; 26 | DAY; 11 | CHI; 4 | NHA; 1 | POC; 41 | IND; 12 | **GLN**; 31 | MCH; 37 | BRI; 6 | DAR; 34 | RCH; 4 | **DOV**; 12 | KAN; 30 | CLT; 6 | MAR; 2 | TAL; 25 | PHO; 9 | CAR; 4 | HOM; 41 | ATL; 8 | NHA; 10 | 5th | 4612 | |
| 2002 | Robert Yates Racing | 88 | Ford | DAY; 14 | CAR; 42 | LVS; 7 | ATL; 13 | DAR; 40 | BRI; 29 | TEX; 24* | MAR; 4 | TAL; 6 | CAL; 6 | RCH; 38 | CLT; 19 | DOV; 5 | POC; 1 | **MCH**; 2* | SON; 15 | DAY; 35 | CHI; 11 | NHA; 3 | POC; 4 | IND; 10 | GLN; 37 | MCH; 1 | BRI; 28 | DAR; 5 | RCH; 31 | NHA; 7 | DOV; 3 | KAN; 39 | TAL; 9 | CLT; 14 | MAR; 8 | ATL; 3 | CAR; 12 | PHO; 9 | HOM; 15 | 9th | 4415 | |
| 2003 | Robert Yates Racing | 88 | Ford | DAY; 10 | CAR; 1 | LVS; 41 | ATL; 21 | DAR; 18 | BRI; 36 | TEX; 13 | TAL; 12 | MAR; 20 | CAL; 37 | RCH; 36 | CLT; 9 | DOV; 39 | POC; 42 | MCH; 32 | SON; 42 | DAY; 10 | CHI; 30 | NHA; 7 | POC; 21 | IND; 39 | GLN; 7 | MCH; 23 | BRI; 7 | DAR; 34 | RCH; 21 | NHA; 41 | DOV; 18 | TAL; 19 | KAN; 33 | CLT; 22 | MAR; 11 | ATL; 12 | PHO; 29 | CAR; 38 | HOM; 26 | 26th | 3358 | |
| 2004 | Robert Yates Racing | 88 | Ford | DAY; 10 | CAR; 40 | LVS; 11 | ATL; 9 | DAR; 32 | BRI; 21 | TEX; 18 | MAR; 10 | TAL; 16 | CAL; 24 | RCH; 13 | CLT; 18 | DOV; 11 | POC; 26 | MCH; 3 | SON; 18 | DAY; 16 | CHI; 3 | NHA; 9 | POC; 24 | IND; 2 | GLN; 27 | MCH; 3 | BRI; 10 | CAL; 8 | RCH; 26 | NHA; 27 | DOV; 4 | TAL; 3 | KAN; 8 | CLT; 6 | MAR; 37 | ATL; 15 | PHO; 22 | DAR; 37 | HOM; 24 | 15th | 4214 | |
| 2005 | Robert Yates Racing | 88 | Ford | **DAY**; 15 | CAL; 11 | LVS; 18 | ATL; 23 | BRI; 5 | MAR; 14 | TEX; 14 | PHO; 23 | TAL; 9 | DAR; 15 | RCH; 34 | CLT; 8 | DOV; 23 | POC; 13 | MCH; 24 | SON; 5 | DAY; 5 | CHI; 18 | NHA; 16 | POC; 15 | IND; 14 | GLN; 22 | MCH; 34 | BRI; 31 | CAL; 24 | RCH; 39 | NHA; 18 | DOV; 15 | TAL; 1 | KAN; 38 | CLT; 30 | MAR; 31 | ATL; 14 | TEX; 12 | PHO; 9 | HOM; 17 | 15th | 3960 | |
| 2006 | Robert Yates Racing | 88 | Ford | DAY; 10 | CAL; 17 | LVS; 19 | ATL; 9 | BRI; 20 | MAR; 15 | TEX; 17 | PHO; 19 | TAL; 12 | RCH; 21 | DAR; 24 | CLT; 43 | DOV; 24 | POC; 38 | MCH; 20 | SON; 34 | DAY; 22 | CHI; 31 | NHA; 31 | POC; 28 | IND; 28 | GLN; 26 | MCH; 36 | BRI; 15 | CAL; 10 | RCH; 21 | NHA; 28 | DOV; 15 | KAN; 4 | TAL; 12 | CLT; 41 | MAR; 16 | ATL; 11 | TEX; 29 | PHO; 39 | HOM; 31 | 23rd | 3438 | |
| 2007 | Michael Waltrip Racing | 44 | Toyota | DAY; 22 | CAL; 32 | LVS; 33 | ATL; 36 | BRI; 42 | MAR; 28 | TEX; 30 | PHO; 29 | TAL; 40 | RCH; DNQ | DAR; DNQ | CLT; 40 | DOV; 43 | POC; DNQ | MCH; DNQ | SON; 26 | NHA; DNQ | DAY; 27 | CHI; DNQ | IND; DNQ | POC; 42 | GLN; 29 | MCH; DNQ | BRI; 34 | CAL; DNQ | RCH; 31 | NHA; DNQ | DOV; 41 | KAN; 26 | TAL; 41 | CLT; DNQ | MAR; 30 | ATL; 19 | TEX; 38 | PHO; DNQ | HOM; 17 | 41st | 1584 | |
| 2008 | Michael Waltrip Racing | 44 | Toyota | DAY; 16 | CAL; 33 | LVS; 39 | ATL; 26 | BRI; 37 | MAR | TEX | PHO | TAL | RCH | DAR | CLT | DOV | POC | MCH | SON | NHA | DAY | CHI | IND | POC | GLN | MCH | BRI | CAL | RCH | NHA | DOV | KAN | TAL | CLT | MAR | ATL | TEX | PHO | HOM | 54th | 367 | |

===== Daytona 500 =====
| Year | Team | Manufacturer | Start | Finish |
|---|---|---|---|---|
| 1988 | Ellington Racing | Buick | 36 | 16 |
| 1989 | Cale Yarborough Motorsports | Pontiac | 20 | 32 |
| 1991 | Wood Brothers Racing | Ford | 17 | 6 |
| 1992 | Joe Gibbs Racing | Chevrolet | 35 | 36 |
| 1993 | Joe Gibbs Racing | Chevrolet | 2 | **1** |
| 1994 | Joe Gibbs Racing | Chevrolet | 41 | 35 |
| 1995 | Robert Yates Racing | Ford | **1** | 5 |
| 1996 | Robert Yates Racing | Ford | 7 | **1** |
| 1997 | Robert Yates Racing | Ford | 3 | 23 |
| 1998 | Robert Yates Racing | Ford | 5 | 34 |
| 1999 | Robert Yates Racing | Ford | 8 | 37 |
| 2000 | Robert Yates Racing | Ford | **1** | **1** |
| 2001 | Robert Yates Racing | Ford | 31 | 22 |
| 2002 | Robert Yates Racing | Ford | 21 | 14 |
| 2003 | Robert Yates Racing | Ford | 11 | 10 |
| 2004 | Robert Yates Racing | Ford | 31 | 10 |
| 2005 | Robert Yates Racing | Ford | **1** | 15 |
| 2006 | Robert Yates Racing | Ford | 25 | 10 |
| 2007 | Michael Waltrip Racing | Toyota | 43 | 22 |
| 2008 | Michael Waltrip Racing | Toyota | 20 | 16 |

==== Busch Series ====
NASCAR Busch Series results
| Year | Team | No. | Make | 1 | 2 | 3 | 4 | 5 | 6 | 7 | 8 | 9 | 10 | 11 | 12 | 13 | 14 | 15 | 16 | 17 | 18 | 19 | 20 | 21 | 22 | 23 | 24 | 25 | 26 | 27 | 28 | 29 | 30 | 31 | 32 | 33 | 34 | 35 | NBSC | Pts | Ref |
|---|---|---|---|---|---|---|---|---|---|---|---|---|---|---|---|---|---|---|---|---|---|---|---|---|---|---|---|---|---|---|---|---|---|---|---|---|---|---|---|---|---|
| 1982 | Thackston Racing | 24 | Ford | DAY; 10 | RCH; 6 | | MAR; 12 | | HCY; 8 | SBO | CRW; 7 | RCH; 21 | LGY; 13 | | HCY; 9 | | ASH; 10 | HCY; 6 | SBO; 7 | CAR; 8 | CRW; 6 | SBO; 9 | HCY; 21 | LGY; 9 | IRP; 13 | | HCY; 8 | RCH; 25 | | | HCY; 3 | MAR; 37 | | | | | | | 6th | 3415 | |
| 1982 | Isenhower Racing | 32 | Pontiac | | | BRI; 25 | | DAR; 19 | | | | | | | | CLT; 29 | | | | | | | | | | | | | MAR; 12 | CLT; 30 | | | | | | | | | 6th | 3415 | |
| 1982 | Isenhower Racing | 32 | Ford | | | | | | | | | | | DOV; 11 | | | | | | | | | | | | BRI; 26 | | | | | | | | | | | | | 6th | 3415 | |
| 1983 | Isenhower Racing | 32 | Pontiac | DAY; 14 | RCH; 24 | CAR; 13 | HCY; 7 | MAR; 24 | NWS; 14 | SBO; 9 | GPS; 3 | | DOV; 26 | BRI; 2 | CLT; 18 | SBO; 5 | HCY; 9 | ROU; 21 | SBO; 22 | ROU; 3 | CRW; 5 | ROU; 5 | SBO; 3 | HCY; 5 | **LGY**; 2* | IRP; 6 | GPS; 2 | BRI; 14 | HCY; 3 | DAR; 32 | RCH; 3 | NWS; 18 | **SBO**; 15 | MAR; 3 | **ROU**; 2 | CLT; 14 | HCY; 3 | **MAR**; 2 | 5th | 4837 | |
| 1983 | Isenhower Racing | 32 | Ford | | | | | | | | | LGY; 3 | | | | | | | | | | | | | | | | | | | | | | | | | | | 5th | 4837 | |
| 1984 | Isenhower Racing | 32 | Pontiac | DAY; 18 | RCH; 2 | CAR; 20 | HCY; 7 | MAR; 2 | | **ROU**; 8 | NSV; 6 | LGY; 3 | MLW; 6 | | | SBO; 7 | HCY; 20 | ROU; 4 | SBO; 9 | ROU; 16 | HCY; 6 | IRP; 5 | LGY; 3 | SBO; 17 | BRI; 17 | | RCH; 15 | NWS; 8 | | HCY; 3 | | MAR; 5 | | | | | | | 4th | 4014 | |
| 1984 | Isenhower Racing | 32 | Buick | | | | | | DAR; 7 | | | | | DOV; 11 | CLT; 26 | | | | | | | | | | | DAR; 3 | | | CLT; 6 | | CAR; 22 | | | | | | | | 4th | 4014 | |
| 1985 | Isenhower Racing | 32 | Olds | DAY; 9 | CAR; 4 | HCY; 6* | BRI; 28 | MAR; 16 | DAR; 6 | SBO; 7 | LGY; 14 | DOV; 13 | CLT; 13 | SBO; 6 | HCY; 15 | ROU; 10 | IRP; 5 | SBO; 3* | LGY; 6 | HCY; 3 | MLW; 4 | BRI; 12 | | RCH; 2 | NWS; 5 | ROU; 3 | CLT; 13 | HCY; 6 | CAR; 5 | MAR; 19 | | | | | | | | | 5th | 3774 | |
| 1985 | Isenhower Racing | 52 | Pontiac | | | | | | | | | | | | | | | | | | | | DAR; 15 | | | | | | | | | | | | | | | | 5th | 3774 | |
| 1986 | Isenhower Racing | 32 | Pontiac | DAY; 22 | CAR; 15 | HCY; 9 | MAR; 5* | BRI; 24 | DAR; 20 | SBO; 21 | **LGY**; 5 | JFC; 2 | DOV; 4 | CLT; 37 | **SBO**; 6 | HCY; 5 | ROU; 2 | IRP; 7 | **SBO**; 3* | RAL; 21 | OXF; 40 | **SBO**; 3 | HCY; 12 | LGY; 4 | **ROU**; 1* | BRI; 4 | DAR; 17 | RCH; 2 | DOV; 22 | MAR; 5 | ROU; 6 | CLT; 12 | CAR; 3 | MAR; 6 | | | | | 4th | 4186 | |
| 1987 | Isenhower Racing | 32 | Buick | DAY; 32 | | | DAR; 19 | | | | CLT; 34 | DOV; 20 | | | | | | | | | | | | DAR; 14 | | DOV; 14 | | CLT; 15 | CAR; 13 | | | | | | | | | | 5th | 3384 | |
| 1987 | Isenhower Racing | 32 | Pontiac | | HCY; 16 | MAR; 2 | | BRI; 3 | LGY; 15 | SBO; 7 | | | IRP; 33 | | | | | | | | | | | | | | | | | | | | | | | | | | 5th | 3384 | |
| 1987 | Isenhower Racing | 32 | Chevy | | | | | | | | | | | ROU; 9 | JFC; 3 | OXF; 7 | SBO; 23 | HCY; 1 | RAL; 19 | LGY; 5 | ROU; 16 | BRI; 6 | JFC; 13 | | RCH; 9 | | MAR; 13 | | | MAR; 6 | | | | | | | | | 5th | 3384 | |
| 1988 | Isenhower Racing | 32 | Olds | DAY; 5 | **HCY**; 5 | CAR; 3 | MAR; 25 | DAR; 3 | BRI; 20 | LNG | NZH | SBO | NSV | CLT; 1 | DOV; 30 | ROU | LAN | LVL | MYB | OXF | SBO | HCY | LNG | IRP | ROU | BRI; 32 | DAR; 35 | RCH; 34 | DOV | MAR; 30 | CLT; 10 | CAR; 40 | MAR; 11 | | | | | | 26th | 1607 | |
| 1989 | Isenhower Racing | 32 | Pontiac | DAY; 13 | CAR; 21 | MAR | **HCY**; 5 | DAR; 31 | BRI | NZH | SBO | LAN | NSV | CLT; 6 | DOV | ROU | LVL | VOL | MYB | SBO | HCY | DUB | IRP | ROU | BRI; 4 | DAR; 40 | RCH | DOV | MAR; 31 | CLT; 3* | CAR; 27 | MAR | | | | | | | 34th | 1049 | |
| 1990 | Isenhower Racing | 32 | Pontiac | DAY; 9 | RCH; 4 | CAR; 7 | MAR; 3 | HCY; 27 | DAR; 35 | BRI; 2 | LAN | SBO | NZH | HCY | CLT; 1 | DOV; DNQ | ROU | VOL | MYB; 17 | OXF | NHA; 8 | SBO | DUB | IRP; 12 | ROU | BRI; 2 | DAR; 1 | RCH; 8 | DOV; 4 | MAR; 3 | CLT; 3 | NHA | CAR; 9 | MAR | | | | | 19th | 2473 | |
| 1991 | DAJ Racing | 32 | Pontiac | DAY; 31 | RCH; 4 | CAR; 1 | MAR; 2 | VOL | HCY; 19 | DAR; 1 | BRI; 24 | LAN | SBO | NZH | CLT; DNQ | DOV; 31 | ROU | HCY | MYB | GLN | OXF | NHA; 38 | SBO | DUB | IRP; 7 | ROU | BRI; 1* | DAR; 14 | RCH; 3 | DOV; 31 | CLT; 28 | NHA | CAR; 2 | MAR; 3 | | | | | 23rd | 2172 | |
| 1992 | DAJ Racing | 32 | Chevy | DAY; 44 | CAR | RCH | | | | | | | | | | | | | | | | | | | | | | | | | | | | | | | | | 28th | 1304 | |
| 1992 | DAJ Racing | 18 | Chevy | | | | ATL; 9 | MAR | DAR; 14 | BRI; 4 | HCY | LAN | DUB | NZH | CLT; 5 | DOV | ROU | MYB | GLN | VOL | NHA | TAL | IRP | ROU | MCH; 6 | NHA | BRI; 27 | DAR; 2 | RCH; 16 | DOV | CLT; 36 | MAR | CAR | HCY; 12 | | | | | 28th | 1304 | |
| 1993 | DAJ Racing | 32 | Chevy | DAY | CAR | RCH | DAR; 9 | BRI | HCY; 29 | ROU | MAR | NZH | CLT; 3 | DOV; 4 | MYB | GLN | MLW | TAL; 31 | IRP | MCH | NHA | BRI; 31 | DAR | RCH; 9 | DOV | ROU | CLT; 37 | MAR | CAR; 16 | HCY; 7 | ATL | | | | | | | | 34th | 1130 | |
| 1994 | DAJ Racing | 32 | Chevy | DAY; 2 | CAR; 40 | RCH | ATL; 9 | MAR | DAR; 38 | HCY | BRI; 4 | ROU | NHA | NZH | CLT; 36 | DOV; 21 | MYB | GLN | MLW | SBO | TAL; 35 | HCY | IRP | MCH | BRI | DAR; 2 | RCH | DOV; 11 | CLT; 20 | MAR | CAR | | | | | | | | 36th | 1176 | |
| 1995 | DAJ Racing | 32 | Ford | DAY; 38 | CAR | RCH | ATL; 34 | NSV | DAR | BRI; 12 | HCY | NHA; 31 | NZH | CLT; 25 | DOV; 5 | MYB | GLN | MLW; 1 | TAL | SBO | IRP | **MCH**; 42* | BRI | DAR | RCH; 1 | DOV | CLT; 2 | CAR; 28 | HOM; 1 | | | | | | | | | | 32nd | 1376 | |
| 1996 | DAJ Racing | 32 | Ford | DAY; 2 | CAR; 38 | RCH; 9 | ATL; DNQ | NSV | DAR; 6 | BRI; 15 | HCY | NZH | **CLT**; 6 | DOV; 6 | SBO | MYB | GLN | MLW; 41 | NHA | TAL; 32 | IRP; 5 | MCH; 21 | BRI; 2 | DAR; 8 | RCH; DNQ | DOV; 2 | CLT; 32 | CAR; 2 | HOM; 20 | | | | | | | | | | 22nd | 2109 | |
| 1997 | DAJ Racing | 32 | Ford | DAY; 45 | CAR; 2 | RCH | ATL; 23 | LVS; 11 | DAR | HCY | TEX; 23 | BRI; DNQ | NSV | TAL | NHA | NZH | CLT; 20 | DOV; 6 | SBO | GLN; 8 | MLW | MYB | GTY | IRP | MCH; 40 | BRI; 39 | DAR | RCH; 20 | DOV | CLT; 7 | CAL | CAR | HOM; 16 | | | | | | 36th | 1364 | |
| 1998 | DAJ Racing | 32 | Ford | DAY | CAR | LVS; 5 | NSV | DAR | BRI; 30 | TEX; 29 | HCY | TAL | NHA | NZH | CLT; 12 | DOV; 4 | RCH; DNQ | PPR | GLN | MLW | MYB | CAL; 37 | SBO | IRP | MCH; 17 | BRI; 3* | DAR; 7 | RCH | DOV; 43 | CLT; 12 | GTY | CAR | ATL; 42 | HOM | | | | | 41st | 1284 | |
| 1999 | Jarrett/Favre Motorsports | 11 | Ford | DAY | CAR | LVS | ATL | DAR | TEX | NSV | BRI | TAL | CAL | NHA | RCH | NZH | CLT | DOV | SBO | GLN | MLW | MYB | PPR | GTY | IRP | MCH | BRI | DAR; 39 | RCH | DOV | CLT | CAR | MEM | PHO | HOM | | | | 127th | 46 | |
| 2005 | Robert Yates Racing | 90 | Ford | DAY | CAL; 10 | MXC | LVS | ATL | NSH | BRI; 30 | TEX | PHO | TAL | DAR; 21 | RCH | CLT | DOV; 4 | NSH | KEN | MLW | DAY | CHI | NHA | PPR | GTY | IRP | GLN; 39 | MCH | BRI | CAL | RCH | DOV | KAN | CLT | MEM | TEX | PHO | HOM | 70th | 513 | |
| 2007 | Michael Waltrip Racing | 44 | Toyota | DAY | CAL | MXC | LVS | ATL | BRI | NSH | TEX | PHO | TAL | RCH | DAR | CLT | DOV | NSH | KEN | MLW | NHA | DAY | CHI | GTY | IRP | CGV | GLN | MCH | BRI; 23 | CAL | RCH | DOV | KAN | CLT | MEM | TEX | PHO | HOM | 130th | 94 | |

=== ARCA Talladega SuperCar Series ===
(key) (Bold – Pole position awarded by qualifying time. Italics – Pole position earned by points standings or practice time. * – Most laps led.)

ARCA Talladega SuperCar Series results
| Year | Team | No. | Make | 1 | 2 | 3 | 4 | 5 | 6 | 7 | 8 | 9 | 10 | 11 | 12 | 13 | 14 | ATCSC | Pts | Ref |
|---|---|---|---|---|---|---|---|---|---|---|---|---|---|---|---|---|---|---|---|---|
| 1985 | Isenhower Racing | 32 | Olds | ATL | DAY | ATL | TAL | ATL | SSP | IRP; 5 | CSP | FRS | IRP | OEF | ISF | DSF | TOL | 103rd | – | |

=== International Race of Champions ===
(key) (Bold – Pole position. * – Most laps led.)

International Race of Champions results
| Year | Make | 1 | 2 | 3 | 4 | Pos. | Pts | Ref |
|---|---|---|---|---|---|---|---|---|
| 1994 | Dodge | DAY; 3 | DAR; 12 | TAL; 3 | MCH; 12 | 8th | 34 | |
| 1996 | Pontiac | DAY | TAL | CLT | MCH; 9 | NA | 0 | |
| 1997 | Pontiac | DAY; 7 | CLT; 10 | CAL; 8 | MCH; 3 | 8th | 34 | |
| 1998 | Pontiac | DAY; 6 | CAL; 8 | MCH; 10 | IND; 7 | 10th | 29 | |
| 1999 | Pontiac | **DAY**; 8 | TAL; 10* | MCH; 11 | IND; 6 | 8th | 30 | |
| 2000 | Pontiac | DAY; 8 | TAL; 8 | MCH; 5 | IND; 8 | 9th | 31 | |
| 2001 | Pontiac | DAY; 1 | TAL; 11 | MCH; 8 | IND; 4 | 5th | 47 | |
| 2002 | Pontiac | DAY; 12 | **CAL**; 3 | CHI; 9 | IND; 1* | 3rd | 49 | |

Sporting positions
| Preceded by Jeff Gordon | NASCAR Winston Cup Series champion 1999 | Succeeded by Bobby Labonte |
Achievements
| Preceded by Davey Allison; Sterling Marlin; Jeff Gordon | Daytona 500 winner 1993; 1996; 2000 | Succeeded by Sterling Marlin; Jeff Gordon; Michael Waltrip |
| Preceded by Dale Earnhardt; Mark Martin; Dale Earnhardt Jr. | Budweiser Shootout winner 1996; 2000; 2004 | Succeeded by Jeff Gordon; Tony Stewart; Jimmie Johnson |
| Preceded by Bobby Labonte | Coca-Cola 600 winner 1996 | Succeeded by Jeff Gordon |
| Preceded by Dale Earnhardt; Jeff Gordon | Brickyard 400 winner 1996; 1999 | Succeeded by Ricky Rudd; Bobby Labonte |
