= Jarrett/Favre Motorsports =

Defunct American stock car racing team

- Owner(s): Dale Jarrett, Brett Favre
- Series: Busch Series
- Race drivers: 11. Kenny Irwin Jr., Steve Grissom, Jason Jarrett, Hut Stricklin
- Manufacturer: Pontiac; Chevrolet
- Opened: 1999
- Closed: 2000

Career
- Debut: 1999 Coca-Cola 300 (Texas)
- Latest race: 2000 Miami 300 (Homestead-Miami)
- Races competed: 29
- Drivers' Championships: 0
- Race victories: 0
- Pole positions: 0

Jarrett/Favre Motorsports was an American stock car racing team owned by NASCAR driver Dale Jarrett and National Football League quarterback Brett Favre. The team raced in the Busch Series from 1999 to 2000.

== Busch Series ==
=== Founding ===
Brett Favre signed on as part-owner of the team in early 1999 to couple with Dale Jarrett.

=== Car No. 11 History ===
The team debuted with Kenny Irwin Jr. at Texas Motor Speedway in March 1999. Irwin posted a fifth in that first race, which was coincidentally the team's best finish in competition. Irwin made four more starts, posting another fifth at Dover International Speedway. Team owner Jarrett made one start at Darlington Speedway and fell victim to overheating. Jason Jarrett, Dale's son, made one start at Gateway Motorsports Park and finished 25th, one lap down. Steve Grissom made four starts near the end of the season, recording a best finish of 13th at Memphis International Raceway.

In 2000, the team shifted its focus to the younger Jarrett, with Rayovac returning as primary sponsor. Jarrett struggled mightily in the first nineteen races of the season, posting his only top-20 finish at Daytona International Speedway, crashing out of three races, and failing to qualify for eight other races, making for only eleven starts. To try to help performance, the team switched from Pontiacs to Chevrolets and changed crew chiefs from Wes Ward to Rick Bowman. However, neither of the changes seemed to improve performance, so journeyman driver Hut Stricklin was hired to run two races, at Pikes Peak International Raceway and Gateway. Stricklin only qualified for the race at Pikes Peak and finished 28th. Stricklin also attempted the fall race for the team at Phoenix International Raceway, but did not qualify. Jarrett returned to the car after the Gateway race, but failed to qualify for three more races and posted a best finish of 22nd at Bristol Motor Speedway, even as Verizon Wireless came on board as an associate sponsor.

In September 2000, Rayovac announced that they would not renew their sponsorship into 2001. Plagued by poor performance, Jarrett/Favre Motorsports did not return for the 2001 season.

==== Car No. 11 results ====
NASCAR Busch Series results
Year	Driver	No.	Make	1	2	3	4	5	6	7	8	9	10	11	12	13	14	15	16	17	18	19	20	21	22	23	24	25	26	27	28	29	30	31	32	Owners	Pts
1999	Kenny Irwin Jr.	11	Ford	DAY	CAR	LVS	ATL	DAR	TEX; 5	NSV	BRI	TAL	CAL; DNQ	NHA	RCH	NZH	CLT; DNQ	DOV; 11	SBO	GLN					IRP; 16	MCH; 33	BRI; DNQ		RCH; DNQ	DOV; 5	CLT; DNQ					49th	1144
1999	Dennis Setzer	11	Ford																		MLW; DNQ	MYB	PPR													49th	1144
1999	Jason Jarrett	11	Ford																					GTY; 25												49th	1144
1999	Dale Jarrett	11	Ford																									DAR; 39								49th	1144
1999	Steve Grissom	11	Ford																													CAR; 27	MEM; 13	PHO; 36	HOM; 41	49th	1144
2000	Jason Jarrett	11	Pontiac	DAY; 17	CAR; DNQ	LVS; 42	ATL; 22	DAR; DNQ	BRI; DNQ	TEX; DNQ	NSV; 23	TAL; 39	CAL; 33	RCH; DNQ	NHA; 35																					41st	1580
2000	Jason Jarrett	11	Chevy													CLT; 33	DOV; DNQ	SBO; 26	MYB; DNQ	GLN; 32	MLW; 33	NZH; DNQ			IRP; 27		BRI; 22	DAR; DNQ	RCH; 24	DOV; 43	CLT; 41	CAR; DNQ	MEM; DNQ		HOM; 36	41st	1580
2000	Hut Stricklin	11	Chevy																				PPR; 28	GTY; DNQ										PHO; DNQ		41st	1580
2000	Morgan Shepherd	11	Chevy																							MCH; DNQ										41st	1580
