= Jason Jarrett (racing driver) =

American racing driver (born 1975)

- Born: Jason Anthony Jarrett; October 14, 1975 (age 51); Conover, North Carolina, U.S.
- Awards: 2001 ARCA Racing Series Rookie of the Year; 2003 Bill France Triple Crown Award

NASCAR Cup Series career
- 2 races run over 2 years
- Best finish: 67th (2003)
- First race: 2003 EA Sports 500 (Talladega)
- Last race: 2004 Pennsylvania 500 (Pocono)
Wins	Top tens	Poles
0	0	0

NASCAR O'Reilly Auto Parts Series career
- 40 races run over 4 years
- Best finish: 39th (2000)
- First race: 1997 Galaxy Foods 300 (Hickory)
- Last race: 2000 Miami 300 (Homestead)
Wins	Top tens	Poles
0	0	0

Jason Anthony Jarrett (born October 14, 1975) is an American race car spotter for Wood Brothers Racing and JR Motorsports. A former driver in the NASCAR Busch Series and ARCA Racing Series, he has not driven in competition since 2005. Jarrett is the son of 1999 NASCAR Winston Cup Series champion Dale Jarrett and the grandson of two-time champion Ned Jarrett.

== Career ==
=== Early years ===
Jarrett's racing career was launched in the World Karting Association (WKA), where in 1993 he claimed the WKA's Sprint Division Championship of the Carolina's Cup at Rockingham Speedway located in Rockingham, North Carolina.

1994 saw Jarrett return to a track that had provided early success for both his father and grandfather at Hickory Motor Speedway. While competing in the Limited Sportsman Division, he scored one victory and one pole, along with earning Rookie-of-the-Year honors. In 1995, Jarrett moved into the Winston Racing Series Late Model Stock Division, where he spent the next three seasons honing his skills at the famed oval.

The 1997 season proved extremely busy for Jarrett, as he competed in a total of 46 late model events between Hickory and Tri-County Speedway located in Hudson, North Carolina.

=== ARCA Racing Series ===
In 2001, Jarrett began his ARCA RE/MAX Series career, with second-place finish in the final ARCA RE/MAX Series point standingsand Rookie-of-the-Year honors. In 2002, he was third in points, and in 2003, he was second again in points as well as earning the Bill France Triple Crown Award. Jarrett won the penultimate race of the 2004 season but finished fifth in points while also competing in the Winston Cup Series. Switching to Venturini Motorsports for the 2005 season, Jarrett did not live up to expectations and was released mid-season, and promptly went on a streak of four DNF's in his first four races for new owner Wayne Hixson.

=== Craftsman Truck Series ===
1996 saw Jarrett attempt to make his NASCAR debut driving in the Craftsman Truck Series at North Wilksboro for Bob Crocker, but his lone attempt in the series resulted in a DNQ.

=== Busch Grand National Series ===
In 1997, Jarrett moved up to the Busch Grand National Series, driving three races for DAJ Racing and failing to qualify for two others. For 1998, Jarrett ran another partial schedule, piloting the No. 32 Carquest car for eleven races and failing to qualify for another. He recorded a best finish of seventeenth at Richmond. Jarrett joined BACE Motorsports in 1999, attempting ten races and qualifying for eight of them. He also ran one race for Jarrett/Favre Motorsports, a collaboration between his father and NFL star Brett Favre. However, he broke his foot at Memphis in October and did not drive the rest of the season. He also suffered a concussion at Auto Club Speedway earlier in the season and had to be replaced by Johnny Benson Jr. Running full-time in 2000, Jarrett struggled, failing to qualify for eleven races and posting a best finish of seventeenth. He was also replaced by Hut Stricklin for a race at Pocono Raceway. Jarrett has not competed in the series since.

=== Winston Cup Series ===
After three years away from the sport competing in ARCA, Jarrett returned to NASCAR in 2003 and made his Winston Cup Series debut at the 2003 EA Sports 500 that October at Talladega, driving a third car for Robert Yates in the No. 98, alongside his father Dale and Elliott Sadler, who famously barrel rolled late in the race. He mainly stayed out of trouble and finished the race in 29th despite being four laps down. He made one other start in the series at Pocono in the summer of 2004 driving the No. 02 for Hermie Sadler's team, SCORE Motorsports, falling out after forty laps due to a handling issue to a 40th-place result. His only other attempt in the series at Bristol in March driving for Morgan Shepherd resulted in a withdrawal.

== Post-driving career ==
After the 2005 season, Jarrett retired from racing. Starting in 2007, he worked for his father's company, Dale Jarrett Incorporated, as a project manager. In 2010, he joined Germain Racing as a spotter for drivers Casey Mears and Max Papis in the Sprint Cup and Nationwide Series. Three years later, he left the organization to join Stewart–Haas Racing (SHR) as the spotter for driver Ryan Newman in the Sprint Cup Series, and followed Newman in 2014 to Richard Childress Racing in the same role. Jarrett has spotted in all three NASCAR national series, for Newman in Cup, Ryan Truex in the Xfinity Series, and John Hunter Nemechek in the Camping World Truck Series.

In 2022, Jarrett spotted for 23XI Racing for Kurt Busch. Jarrett also spotted for Josh Berry at JR Motorsports in the Xfinity Series and Tate Fogleman at On Point Motorsports in the Camping World Truck Series.

== Personal life ==
Jarrett now resides in Hickory, North Carolina, and is married to Christina. Their first child, Ford, was born November 14, 2008.

== Career highlights ==
- 1993 World Karting Association Sprint Division Champion
- 1994 Hickory Motor Speedway Limited Sportsman Division Rookie of the Year
- 2001 ARCA Racing Series Rookie of the Year
- 2003 Bill France Triple Crown Award

== Motorsports career results ==
=== NASCAR ===
(key) (Bold – Pole position awarded by qualifying time. Italics – Pole position earned by points standings or practice time. * – Most laps led.)

==== Nextel Cup Series ====
NASCAR Nextel Cup Series results
Year	Team	No.	Make	1	2	3	4	5	6	7	8	9	10	11	12	13	14	15	16	17	18	19	20	21	22	23	24	25	26	27	28	29	30	31	32	33	34	35	36	NNCC	Pts	Ref
2003	Yates Racing	98	Ford	DAY	CAR	LVS	ATL	DAR	BRI	TEX	TAL	MAR	CAL	RCH	CLT	DOV	POC	MCH	SON	DAY	CHI	NHA	POC	IND	GLN	MCH	BRI	DAR	RCH	NHA	DOV	TAL; 29	KAN	CLT	MAR	ATL	PHO	CAR	HOM	67th	76	
2004	SCORE Motorsports	02	Chevy	DAY	CAR	LVS	ATL	DAR	BRI	TEX	MAR	TAL	CAL	RCH	CLT	DOV	POC	MCH	SON	DAY	CHI	NHA	POC; 40	IND	GLN	MCH	BRI	CAL	RCH	NHA	DOV	TAL	KAN	CLT	MAR	ATL	PHO	DAR	HOM	86th	43	
2005	Shepherd Racing Ventures	89	Dodge	DAY	CAL	LVS	ATL	BRI; DNQ	MAR	TEX	PHO	TAL	DAR	RCH	CLT	DOV	POC	MCH	SON	DAY	CHI	NHA	POC	IND	GLN	MCH	BRI	CAL	RCH	NHA	DOV	TAL	KAN	CLT	MAR	ATL	TEX	PHO	HOM	NA	-	

==== Busch Series ====
NASCAR Busch Series results
Year	Team	No.	Make	1	2	3	4	5	6	7	8	9	10	11	12	13	14	15	16	17	18	19	20	21	22	23	24	25	26	27	28	29	30	31	32	NBC	Pts	Ref
1997	DAJ Racing	32	Ford	DAY	CAR	RCH	ATL	LVS	DAR	HCY; 21	TEX	BRI	NSV	TAL	NHA; 17	NZH	CLT	DOV	SBO	GLN	MLW	MYB; 22	GTY	IRP	MCH	BRI	DAR	RCH	DOV	CLT; DNQ	CAL	CAR; DNQ	HOM			67th	309	
1998	DAJ Racing	32	Ford	DAY	CAR; 31	LVS	NSV; 20	DAR; 20	BRI	TEX	HCY; 32	TAL; 43	NHA; 36	NZH					GLN; 24	MLW	MYB; 22	CAL	SBO; 23	IRP	MCH	BRI	DAR	RCH; 17	DOV							47th	935	
1998	DAJ Racing	11	Chevy												CLT; 34	DOV	RCH	PPR												CLT; DNQ	GTY	CAR	ATL	HOM		47th	935	
1999	BACE Motorsports	33	Chevy	DAY; 27	CAR; 21	LVS; 38	ATL; 23	DAR; 41	TEX; DNQ	NSV; 24	BRI; DNQ	TAL; 43	CAL; 39	NHA	RCH	NZH	CLT	DOV	SBO	GLN	MLW	MYB	PPR													60th	624	
1999	Jarrett/Favre Motorsports	11	Ford																					GTY; 25	IRP	MCH	BRI	DAR	RCH	DOV	CLT	CAR	MEM	PHO	HOM	60th	624	
2000	Jarrett/Favre Motorsports	11	Pontiac	DAY; 17	CAR; DNQ	LVS; 42	ATL; 22	DAR; DNQ	BRI; DNQ	TEX; DNQ	NSV; 23	TAL; 39	CAL; 33	RCH; DNQ	NHA; 35																					39th	1,187	
2000	Jarrett/Favre Motorsports	11	Chevy													CLT; 33	DOV; DNQ	SBO; 26	MYB; DNQ	GLN; 32	MLW; 33	NZH; DNQ	PPR	GTY	IRP; 27	MCH	BRI; 22	DAR; DNQ	RCH; 24	DOV; 43	CLT; 41	CAR; DNQ	MEM; DNQ	PHO	HOM; 36	39th	1,187	

==== Craftsman Truck Series ====
NASCAR Craftsman Truck Series results
Year	Team	No.	Make	1	2	3	4	5	6	7	8	9	10	11	12	13	14	15	16	17	18	19	20	21	22	23	24	NCTC	Pts	Ref
1996	Bob Crocker	89		HOM	PHO	POR	EVG	TUS	CNS	HPT	BRI	NZH	MLW	LVL	I70	IRP	FLM	GLN	NSV	RCH	NHA	MAR	NWS; DNQ	SON	MMR	PHO	LVS	136	25	

==== Goody's Dash Series ====
NASCAR Goody's Dash Series results
Year	Team	No.	Make	1	2	3	4	5	6	7	8	9	10	11	12	13	14	15	16	17	18	19	20	21	NGDS	Pts	Ref
1996	Moore Racing	99	Chevy	DAY	HOM	MYB	SUM	NSV	TRI	CAR	HCY	FLO	BRI; DNQ	SUM	GRE	SNM	BGS	MYB	LAN	STH	FLO	NWS	VOL	HCY	N/A	0	

=== ARCA Re/Max Series ===
(key) (Bold – Pole position awarded by qualifying time. Italics – Pole position earned by points standings or practice time. * – Most laps led.)

ARCA Re/Max Series results
Year	Team	No.	Make	1	2	3	4	5	6	7	8	9	10	11	12	13	14	15	16	17	18	19	20	21	22	23	24	25	ARMC	Pts	Ref
2000	Jarrett Racing	88	Ford	DAY	SLM	AND	CLT	KIL	FRS	MCH	POC	TOL	KEN	BLN	POC	WIN	ISF	KEN	DSF	SLM	CLT; 4	TAL	ATL						85th	225	
2001	ML Motorsports	67	Pontiac	DAY; 21	NSH; 6			GTY; 7	KEN; 29	CLT; 7		**MCH**; 29					MCH; 12	POC; 8					SLM; 2	TOL; 3	BLN; 5		TAL; 21		2nd	5900	
2001	ML Motorsports	67	Chevy			WIN; 12	SLM; 4				KAN; 1		POC; 22	MEM; 24	GLN; 16	KEN; 24			NSH; 2	ISF; 3	CHI; 2	DSF; 8				CLT; 7		ATL; 6	2nd	5900	
2002	ML Motorsports	67	Pontiac	DAY; 18			SLM; 2						TOL; 2	SBO; 6		BLN; 10			ISF; 10	WIN; 20	DSF; 8		SLM; 14	TAL; 5					3rd	5160	
2002	ML Motorsports	67	Chevy		ATL; 5	NSH; 37		KEN; 13	CLT; 8	KAN; 23	POC; 2	MCH; 33			KEN; 4		POC; 2	NSH; 29				CHI; 5			CLT; 6				3rd	5160	
2003	ML Motorsports	67	Pontiac	DAY; 20			SLM; 6	TOL; 2			BLN; 7			LER; 6					WIN; 3				TAL; 15		SBO; 4				2nd	5470	
2003	ML Motorsports	67	Chevy		ATL; 3	NSH; 11			KEN; 5	CLT; 6		KAN; 4	MCH; 9		POC; 34	POC; 6	NSH; 5	ISF; 7		DSF; 18	CHI; 11	SLM; 2		CLT; 6					2nd	5470	
2004	ML Motorsports	67	Pontiac	DAY; 14																									5th	4860	
2004	ML Motorsports	67	Chevy		NSH; 36	SLM; 2	KEN; 10	TOL; 2	CLT; 18	KAN; 3	POC; 6	MCH; 40	SBO; 19	BLN; 23	KEN; 14	GTW; 5	POC; 9	LER; 3	NSH; 9	ISF; 4	TOL; 18	DSF; 19	CHI; 15	SLM; 1	TAL; 30				5th	4860	
2005	Venturini Motorsports	25	Chevy	DAY	NSH; 9	SLM; 18	KEN; 17	TOL; 3	LAN; 3	MIL; 11	POC; 9	MCH; 22	KAN; 6	KEN; 38	BLN; 29	POC; 6	GTW; 10	LER; 8	NSH; 7	MCH; 13	ISF; 10								9th	4185	
2005	Hixson Motorsports	23	Pontiac																			TOL; 34		CHI; 40	SLM; 35				9th	4185	
2005	Hixson Motorsports	2	Pontiac																				DSF; 29						9th	4185	
2005	Hixson Motorsports	23	Chevy																							TAL; 22			9th	4185	
