= Ace Speedway =

Stock car racing track in North Carolina

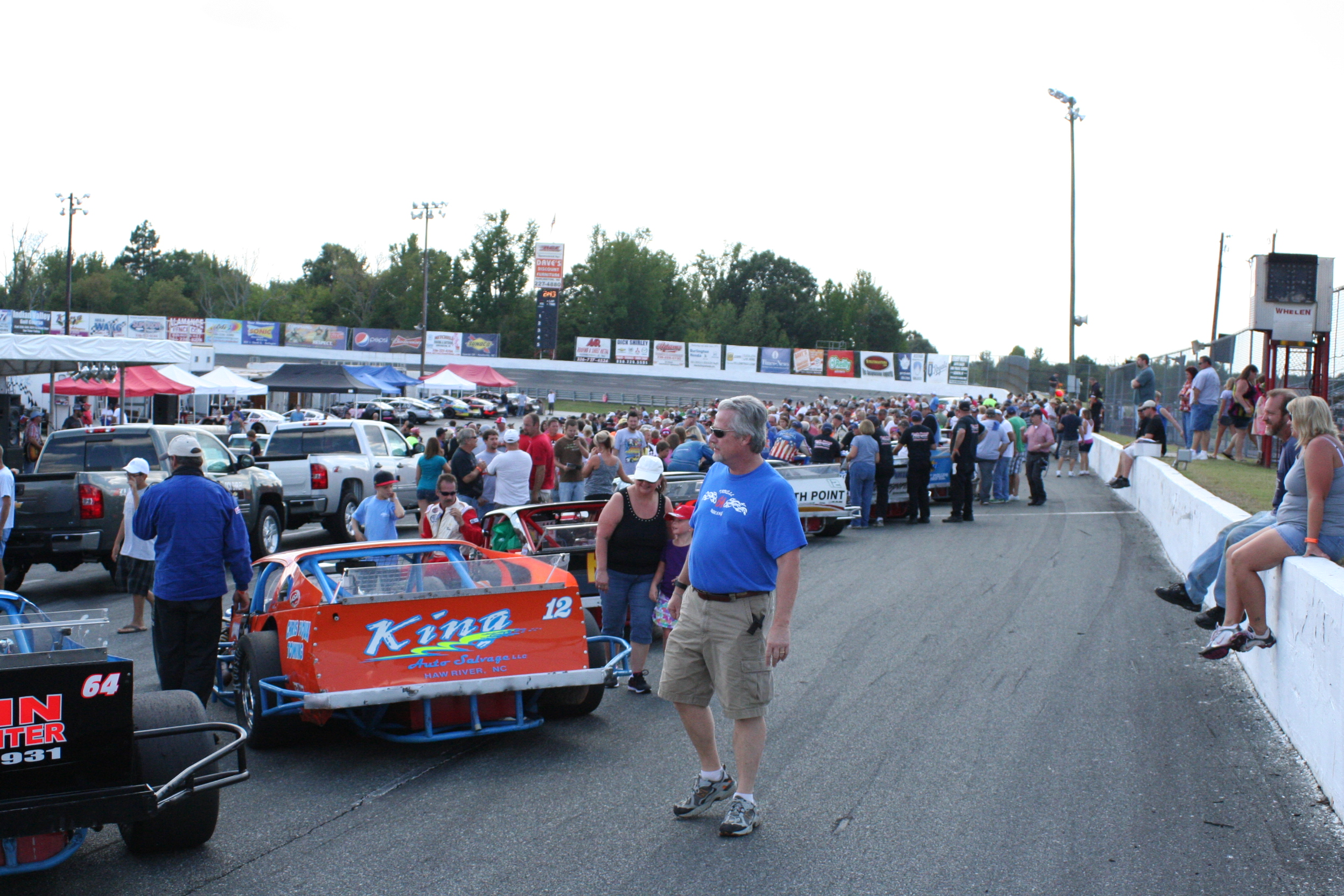
- Pit Party, Ace Speedway, September 2010
- Location: 3401 Altamahaw Race Track Road, Altamahaw, North Carolina, United States; 27244
- Coordinates: 36°11′34″N 79°29′58″W
- Capacity: 5,000
- Opened: 1956
- Former names: Southern Speedway
- Major events: Current: CARS Tour (2000–2005, 2011–2012, 2018–present); Future: SMART Modified Tour (1994, 2000–2003, 2005–2009, 2023, 2027)

Paved Oval (1999–present)
- Surface: Asphalt
- Length: 0.400 mi (0.644 km)
- Turns: 4
- Banking: Turns: 12° Straights: 10°

Paved Oval (1990–1998)
- Surface: Asphalt
- Length: 0.375 mi (0.604 km)
- Turns: 4

Dirt Oval (1984–1989)
- Surface: Dirt
- Length: 0.375 mi (0.604 km)
- Turns: 4

Original Dirt Oval (1956–1983)
- Surface: Dirt
- Length: 0.333 mi (0.536 km)
- Turns: 4

Ace Speedway is a 0.400 mi (0.644 km) oval stock car racing track in Altamahaw, North Carolina. The track was constructed by Roy Maddren and opened in 1956 as a 0.333 mi (0.536 km) dirt oval. In 1984, the track was expanded to a 0.375 mi (0.604 km) dirt oval. In 1990, under the ownership of Fred and Jim Turner, the track was paved and was under the NASCAR Winston Racing Series banner. In 1999, the track was re-expanded to a 0.400 mi (0.644 km) mile paved oval, the pits was expanded and other stuff was added to the track such as new bleachers.

Currently, the track runs CARS Tour. In the past, the speedway hosted NASCAR Whelen Southern Modified Tour and ISCARS.

== COVID Restrictions Lawsuit ==
In 2020, North Carolina governor Roy Cooper ordered restrictions to address the spread of COVID-19, including restricting outdoor gatherings. In protest, the owners of Ace Speedway held races that attracted large crowds of people. Calling the race gatherings "dangerous," Cooper and then-Department of Health and Human Services (DHHS) secretary Mindy Cohen ordered the race track to close and took the owners to court. The local superior court judge issued a temporary restraining order, requiring the racetrack to be closed.

In 2021, NC DHHS made a motion to dismiss the lawsuit, arguing that the Speedway had no constitutional claims and that DHHS was immune due to sovereign immunity. Ace argued that the governor and DHHS had exceeded their constitutional authority and had denied protected rights based on the North Carolina constitution's clause that allows citizens to enjoy the fruits of their own labor. The motion was denied by the superior court judge, and was appealed to the North Carolina Court of Appeals, who ruled that Ace had made sufficient constitutional arguments to continue the case, denying the motion to dismiss, stating, "Ace pled colorable claims for infringement of its right to earn a living and for selective enforcement of the Governor's orders sufficient to survive the Secretary's motion to dismiss."

NC DHHS appealed that decision to the North Carolina Supreme Court, and arguments were heard in November 2023.

== Late Model Track Champions ==
Year	Driver
1990	Barry Beggarly
1991	Glenn Massey
1992	Michael Ritch
1993	Barry Beggarly
1994	Glenn Massey
1995	Dean Ward
1996	Barry Beggarly
1997	Dean Ward
1998	Robert Turner
1999	Ray Young
2000	Glenn Massey
2001	Glenn Massey
2002	James York
2003	Phillip Faucette
2004	Frank Deiny Jr.
2005	Robert Turner
2006	Rodney Cook
2007	Rodney Cook
2008	Dean Fogleman
2009	Speedy Faucette
2010	Dustin Rumley
2011	Barry Beggarly
2012	Dustin Rumley
2013	Dustin Rumley
2014	R.D. Smith
2015	R.D. Smith

== Mischa Sell Memorial 174 ==
The Mischa Sell Memorial race is a 74-Lap main race for Limited Late Model stock cars. The Memorial race was started in 2012 by David Sell to honor his wife's legacy and raise money to help fight cancer. The race is one of the biggest in the area for limited late models.

Mischa Sell Memorial 174 Winners
Year	Driver	Hometown	Winners Purse
2012	Scott Hall	Walkertown, North Carolina	$2,700
2013	Joey Throckmorton	South Boston, Virginia	$4,885
2014	Austin Thaxton	Cluster Springs, Virginia	$5,625
2015	Dylan Ward	Winston-Salem, North Carolina	$10,750
