= South Boston Speedway =

Race track in Virginia, United States

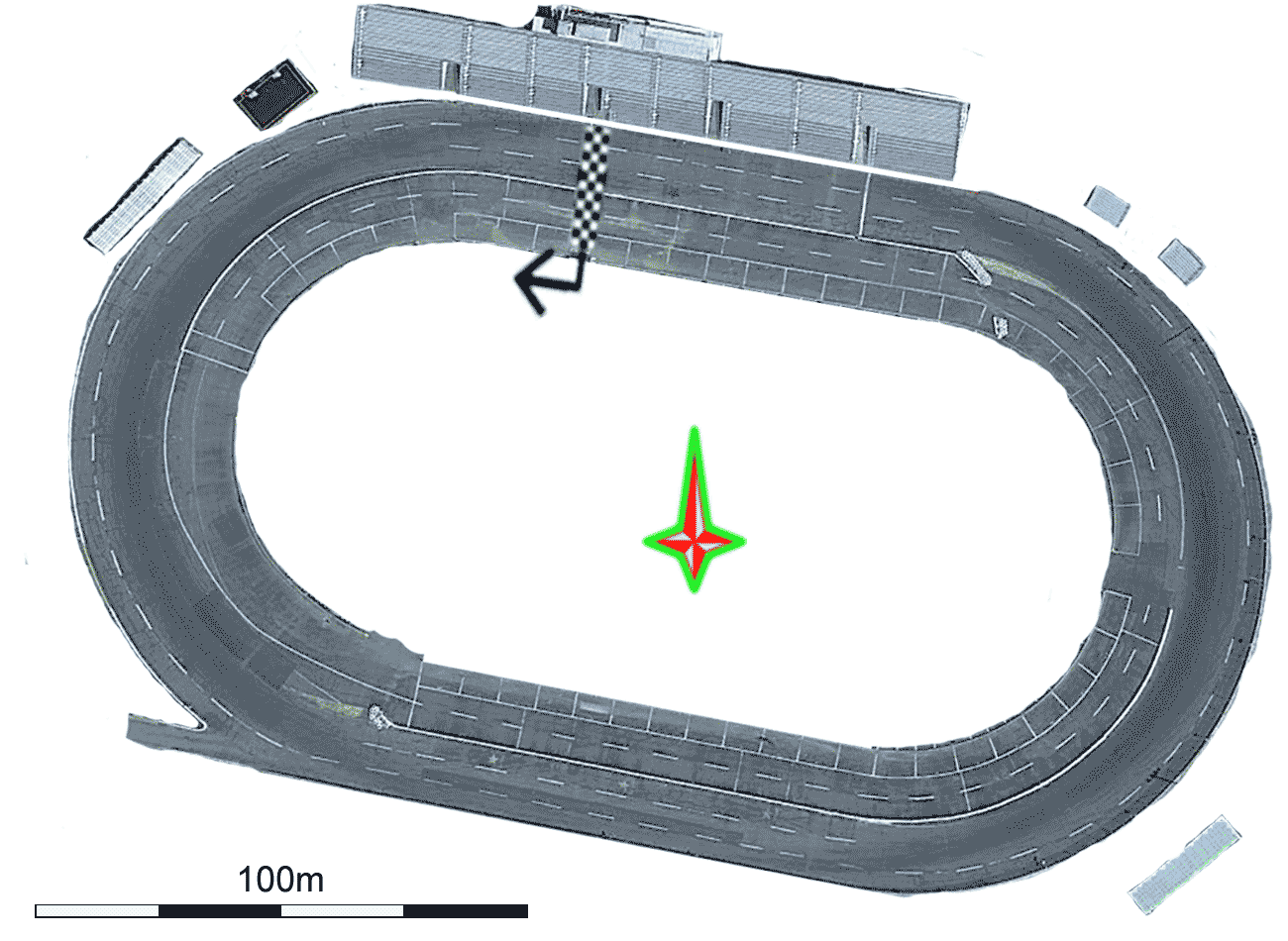
- Oval (1957–present)
- Location: 1188 James D. Hagood Hwy. South Boston, Virginia 24592
- Coordinates: 36°42′32″N 78°52′7″W
- Capacity: 7,600
- Owner: Mattco Inc. (Pocono Raceway)
- Opened: 10 August 1957; 69 years ago
- Major events: Current: CARS Tour (1997–2011, 2017–2019, 2021–present); SMART Modified Tour (1992–1993, 2001, 2009–2016, 2021–present); Thunder Road Harley-Davidson 200 (2006–2019, 2021–present); Former: SRX Series (2022); NASCAR K&N Pro Series East Who's Your Driver Twin 100s (2007–2011, 2017–2019); NASCAR Whelen Modified Tour (2001, 2019); NASCAR Southeast Series (1992–1996, 1998, 2001–2003, 2005–2006); ARCA Re/Max Series (2002–2004); NASCAR Craftsman Truck Series; John Boy & Billy 250 (2001–2003); ASA National Tour (2001–2002); NASCAR Busch Series Textilease/Medique 300 (1982–1991, 1994–2000); NASCAR Winston Cup (1960–1964, 1968–1971)
- Website: southbostonspeedway.com

Oval (1957–present)
- Surface: Asphalt
- Length: 0.400 mi (0.644 km)
- Turns: 4
- Banking: Turns: 12° Straights: 10°

South Boston Speedway, or "SoBo", is a short track located just outside South Boston, Virginia. SoBo is located approximately 60-mile (97 km) east of another area familiar to most NASCAR fans, Martinsville.

The venue is owned by Mattco, Inc., the Mattioli family trust that owns Pocono Raceway, with general manager Brandon Brown operating the track, replacing Cathy Rice who retired in 2021 after serving in that role for 21 years and Chase Brashears who was in the role for two years.

NASCAR's three national series have raced at the track, though the Cup Series has not done so since 1971, while the Busch Series last raced there in 2000. After the Busch Series left the schedule, the Craftsman Truck Series competed at SoBo for a few years between 2001 and 2003. The SRX Series visited the track in 2022.

Like most tracks in the region, it is NASCAR-sanctioned; thus, drivers can run for NASCAR Advance Auto Parts Weekly Series National Points. The track has produced most of the national champions in the past two decades. The track holds around 12 events annually for its local racing divisions, which include the Late Model Stock Cars, Budweiser Limited Sportsman, Southside Disposal Pure Stock, and the VSP Heat Hornets. The East Coast Flathead Ford Racing Association and the Southern Ground Pounders Vintage Racing Club make occasional appearances. All events are broadcast live on FloRacing.

The track has historically been known for its modified racing. The original SMART Modified Tour ran at the track in 1992-93 and 2001. Its successor, the NASCAR Whelen Southern Modified Tour, ran annually from 2009 to 2013 and biannually from 2014 to 2016. The reincarnation of the SMART Modified Tour has run a race since 2021. Beginning in 2023 South Boston was given two races for the SMART Tour with the first race, King of the Modifieds, becoming the tour's crown jewel race. The NASCAR Whelen Modified Tour has run twice at the track, in 2001 and 2019. The NWMT was scheduled to return for a third time in 2020, but the race was canceled due to the COVID-19 pandemic.

The ARCA Menards Series held three races at South Boston between 2002 and 2004. The facility also hosted 11 NASCAR Southeast Series races from 1992 to 2006. The ARCA Menards Series East (then NASCAR K&N Pro Series East) replaced the Southeast Series at the track for the next five years and returned in 2017 for twin 100 lap races that continued into 2019.

South Boston in recent years has been known for its Late Model Stock racing. The Thunder Road Harley-Davidson 200 is SoBo's Crown Jewel race, held annually on Independence Day weekend, and is the first race in the Virginia Triple Crown. Two CARS tours – the CARS Pro Late Model Tour and CARS Late Model Stock Tour – have held multiple events at the speedway, including a stretch of 21 events from 1997 to 2011 (as the CARS X1-R Pro Cup Series) and has made an annual stop since 2017. In 2014 and 2015 the track held the Denny Hamlin Short Track Showdown. The ASA National Tour hosted 2 races at SoBo – one in 2001 and the other in 2002.

Some of the better-known graduates of South Boston's Saturday night weekly events include Jeff Burton, Ward Burton, Elliott Sadler, Stacy Compton, and the Bodine brothers (Todd, Geoff and Brett). Danville, Virginia driver Wendell Scott, the first African-American driver to compete at NASCAR's highest level, also raced in Modified Division events there.

== 2025 South Boston Speedway Schedule ==
Date	Event	Divisions
March 22	King of the Modifieds	SMART Modified Tour (125 Laps), LMSC (Twin 50's)
April 12	Danville Toyota Race Day	LMSC, Limited Sportsman (75 Laps), Pure Stock, Hornets
April 26	NASCAR Weekly Series Racing	LMSC, Limited Sportsman, Pure Stock, Hornets
May 10	NASCAR Weekly Series Racing	LMSC, Limited Sportsman, Pure Stock, Hornets
May 24	NASCAR Weekly Series Racing	LMSC, Limited Sportsman, Pure Stock, Hornets
June 7	NASCAR Weekly Series Racing	LMSC, Limited Sportsman, Pure Stock, Hornets
June 28	Thunder Road Harley-Davidson 200 (Note: Race #1 of the Virginia Triple Crown)	LMSC (200 Laps), Limited Sportsman (40 Laps), Pure Stock (20 Laps), Hornets (15 Laps)
July 26	NASCAR Weekly Series Racing	LMSC, Limited Sportsman, Pure Stock, Hornets
August 9	NASCAR Weekly Series Racing	LMSC, Limited Sportsman, Pure Stock, Hornets
August 23	NASCAR Weekly Series Racing	LMSC, Limited Sportsman, Pure Stock, Hornets
September 6	NASCAR Weekly Series Championship Night	LMSC, Limited Sportsman, Pure Stock, Hornets
September 13	CARS Tour	CARS Late Model Stock Tour (125 Laps), CARS Pro Late Model Tour (100 Laps)

== Notable drivers ==
Dale Earnhardt, Dale Earnhardt Jr., Cale Yarborough, Darrell Waltrip, Terry Labonte, Geoff Bodine, Bobby Allison, Tony Stewart, Ken Schrader, and Benny Parsons are among many Cup Series drivers that have competed at South Boston Speedway over the years. Parsons scored his first career Grand National win at South Boston Speedway when the track hosted its last Grand National race in 1971. Richard Petty won 5 races at South Boston Speedway between 1963 and 1970.

Waltrip was a winner at South Boston Speedway while competing in NASCAR Late Model Sportsman races. Bodine cut his teeth in racing full bodied stock cars when he moved south off of the NASCAR Modified circuit in 1981 to drive for Emanuel Zervakis of Richmond. The former NASCAR Modified driver won nine of 11 NASCAR Late Model Sportsman events and went on to win the South Boston Speedway title that season. He used that experience to vault his way onto the NASCAR Winston Cup Series tour.

In the early 1970s when the NASCAR Grand American Series was popular, drivers such as Tiny Lund, Pete Hamilton, Jim Paschal, Frank Sessoms, and T. C. Hunt competed on the South Boston Speedway oval.

Ray Hendrick, a driver who competed at South Boston Speedway, recorded numerous wins at the track during his career, many of them while driving the winged No. 11 Modified coupe fielded by Jack Tant and Clayton Mitchell. The Richmond, Virginia resident won five track championships at South Boston Speedway, four of them in the NASCAR Modified division and one in the NASCAR Late Model Sportsman division.

Over the years, South Boston Speedway has been a breeding ground for a number of NASCAR stars. South Boston natives Jeff Burton and Ward Burton spent their early careers in the NASCAR Late Model Stock Car Division there. The Burtons are the only brothers to win the South Boston Speedway Most Popular Driver Award.

South Boston Speedway's 1994 champion, Stacy Compton, went on to a successful career, competing in the Cup Series, Busch, and Craftsman Truck Series.

Hermie Sadler and Elliott Sadler of Emporia, Virginia competed in Late Models at South Boston Speedway, with Elliott winning the track championship as a 20-year-old rising star. Cup Series star Denny Hamlin also raced and won multiple times in the Late Model Stock Car Division.

David Blankenship of Moseley, Virginia has the most track championships. In 1998, he won an unprecedented seventh career South Boston Speedway NASCAR Late Model Stock Car Division title. Hendrick's mark of five South Boston Speedway championships is second to Blankenship's seven titles. In 2019, Peyton Sellers of Danville, Virginia won his fifth career South Boston Speedway NASCAR Late Model Stock Car Division title to move into a tie with Hendrick for second place. In 2024, Sellers would tie Blankenship's record.

== Records ==
- Track record – Tommy Catalano (13.849 seconds; 103.979 MPH); NASCAR Whelen Modified
- Race record – Todd Bodine, 70.785 MPH
- Late Model Stock Car Track Record - Peyton Sellers (14.676 seconds; 98.119 MPH; March 16, 2019)
- Limited Sportsman Track Record - Colin Garrett (15.125 seconds; 97.587 MPH; April 8, 2017)
- Pure Stock Track Record - Zach Reaves (17.648 seconds; 81.657 MPH; April 12, 2025)
- NASCAR K&N Pro Series East (now ARCA Menards Series East) Track Record - Chase Cabre (14.711 seconds; 97.886 MPH; April 5, 2017)
- Hornet Track Record - Cameron Goble (19.592 seconds; 71.819 MPH; August 19, 2023)

== Late Model track champions ==
Year	Driver
1960	Eddie Crouse
1961	Ray Hendrick
1962	Ted Hairfield
1963	Ray Hendrick
1964	Runt Harris
1965	Sonny Hutchins / Bob McGinnis
1966	Ray Hendrick
1967	Runt Harris
1968	Ray Hendrick
1969	Eddie Royster
1970	Jimmy Hensley
1971	Lennie Pond
1972	Sonny Hutchins
1977	Sonny Hutchins
1978	Jack Ingram
1979	Ray Hendrick
1980	Sonny Hutchins
1981	Geoff Bodine
1982	Sam Ard
1983	Roy Hendrick
1984	David Blankenship
1985	Maurice Hill
1986	David Blankenship
1987	Wayne Patterson
1988	Barry Beggarly
1989	David Blankenship
1990	David Blankenship
1991	Mike Buffkin
1992	Wayne Patterson
1993	David Blankenship
1994	Stacy Compton
1995	Elliott Sadler
1996	B.A. Wilson
1997	David Blankenship
1998	David Blankenship
1999	Bubba Urban Jr.
2000	Nick Woodward
2001	Brandon Butler
2002	Frank Deiny Jr.
2003	Philip Morris
2004	Timothy Peters
2005	Peyton Sellers
2006	Drew Herring
2007	Adam Baker
2008	Wayne Ramsey
2009	Justin Johnson
2010	Justin Johnson
2011	Philip Morris
2012	Matt Bowling
2013	Lee Pulliam
2014	Peyton Sellers
2015	Matt Bowling
2016	Matt Bowling
2017	Peyton Sellers
2018	Peyton Sellers
2019	Peyton Sellers
2020	No racing due to COVID-19
2021	Peyton Sellers
2022	Layne Riggs
2023	Carter Langley
2024	Peyton Sellers
2025	Peyton Sellers

== Thunder Road Harley-Davidson 200 Winners ==
Year	Winner
2006	Drew Herring
2007	Adam Barker
2008	Deac McCaskill
2009	Nick Smith
2010	Deac McCaskill (2)
2011	Lee Pulliam
2012	Lee Pulliam (2)
2013	Lee Pulliam (3)
2014	Lee Pulliam (4)
2015	Lee Pulliam (5)
2016	Lee Pulliam (6)
2017	Philip Morris
2018	Peyton Sellers
2019	Peyton Sellers (2)
2020	n/a
2021	Bobby McCarty
2022	Corey Heim
2023	Bobby McCarty (2)
2024	Connor Hall
2025	Connor Hall
2026	Kaden Honeycutt

== See also ==
- List of NASCAR race tracks
- Winston Racing Series
- Barry Beggarly
