= Barry Beggarly =

American race car driver

- Born: September 28, 1949 (age 77); Danville, Virginia, U.S.
- Awards: 1993 NASCAR Dodge Weekly Racing Series (NDWS) National Champion; 2011 ASA National Championship

NASCAR O'Reilly Auto Parts Series career
- 6 races run over 3 years
- Best finish: 72nd 1983
- First race: 1982 Dogwood 500 (Martinsville)
- Last race: 1984 Miller 200 (Orange County)
Wins	Top tens	Poles
0	0	0
- Statistics up to date as of Oct, 14th 2013.

Barry Beggarly (born September 28, 1949) is an American race car driver who competed on the short-tracks of Virginia and North Carolina, mainly during the 1980s and 1990s.

Beggarly always used number 82 on his cars. In a Golden Age of short track motor racing in his region, he is considered by many to be one of the best drivers of his era. Beggarly is known by the nickname of "the Southern Gentleman"

== Racing career ==
Beggarly, who resides in the small town of Pelham, North Carolina, earned notoriety in the NASCAR Late Model Stock division. His greatest accomplishment was winning the Winston Racing Series National Championship in 1993, when he was credited with 27 victories on the season in NASCAR Winston Racing Series action, and 32 overall. This championship was one of the closest in history, determined by a tiebreaker over Dennis Setzer.

Beggarly also won the NASCAR Winston Racing Series Mid-Atlantic Region Championship in 1993 and 1994, and finished in the Mid-Atlantic Region Top 10 in several other years. His other accomplishments include winning track titles at Orange County Speedway (1991, 1993, 1994, 2000) in Rougemont, NC, South Boston Speedway (1988), and Ace Speedway (1990, 1993, 1996, 2011) in Altamahaw, NC. Beggarly also won special events for Late Model Stock Cars at Martinsville Speedway, North Wilkesboro Speedway, and various other local tracks, including New River Valley Speedway in Radford, VA, Myrtle Beach Speedway, and Volusia County Speedway.

== Coming out of retirement ==
In 2010, Beggarly came out of retirement and won his first race since 1996 at Ace Speedway. Only racing the last half of the 2010 season, Beggarly managed to capture several wins including the last three of the season.

Beggarly ran a full season in 2011 at Ace Speedway in the late model division and won both the late model Championship and the 2011 American Speed Association (ASA) National points championship. He became the only driver to win both the NASCAR National Championship and the ASA National Championship.

In 2015, at the age of 66, Beggarly won the Late Model Twin 50 Laps race at Ace Speedway. Later that same year, Beggarly won a 75 lap late model race at Orange County Speedway. He would once again come out of retirement in 2022, competing at Orange County.

When asked about his nickname "The Southern Gentleman," Beggarly replied: "All I can say is that if you race clean with me and I will race with you clean. If you want to race dirty, I won't be afraid to get dirty with you."

== Honors ==
- As part of the 25th anniversary of the NASCAR Weekly Series in 2006, Beggarly was named one of the series' All Time Top 25 drivers.
- In 2007, Beggarly was named one of the Top 50 Drivers All Time at South Boston (VA) Speedway.
- Beggarly is currently the only driver to win both the ASA and NASCAR national championships.

== See also ==
- Whelen All-American Series
- Stock car racing
