= Orange County Speedway =

Race track near Rougemont, North Carolina, US

The Fastest 3/8-mile Race Track in America
- Paved Oval (1983–present)
- Location: Little River Township, Orange County, Rougemont, North Carolina
- Coordinates: 36°13′40″N 78°57′41″W
- Capacity: 12,400
- Owner: Orange County Speedway Racing, LLC
- Operator: Orange County Speedway Racing, LLC
- Opened: Initial: 1966; Second: 1983; Third: 11 March 2006; 20 years ago
- Closed: First: 1973; Second: 2003
- Former names: Trico Motor Speedway (1966–1973)
- Major events: Current: SMART Modified Tour (2022–present); Former: CARS Tour (1997, 2012–2019, 2021, 2024–2025); NASCAR Busch Grand National Series; Texas Pete 200 (1983–1994); ASA National Tour (1998–1999); NASCAR Southeast Series (1993–1994, 1999); NASCAR Whelen Modified Tour (1986–1988); NASCAR Grand National East Series (1973)
- Website: http://www.ocstrack.com

Paved Oval (1983–present)
- Surface: Asphalt
- Length: 0.375 mi (0.604 km)
- Turns: 4
- Banking: Turns: 19° Straightaways: 16°

Original Dirt Oval (1966–1973)
- Surface: Dirt
- Length: 0.625 mi (1.006 km)
- Turns: 4

Orange County Speedway is a 0.375 mi (0.604 km) asphalt oval in Orange County, North Carolina, near Rougemont. It first opened in 1966 as a 0.250 mi (0.402 km) and a 0.625 mi (1.006 km) dirt oval (Trico Speedway), which operated until 1967 and 1973, respectively. The facility was reopened and paved in 1983. With a slogan of "the fastest 3/8-mile race track in America," the oval features 19-degree banking through the turns and 16 degrees on the straightaways, creating three distinct grooves making for very fast turns. The aluminum grandstands stretch from Turn 4 all the way down the front straightaway to Turn 1. The speedway closed in 2003 but reopened on March 11, 2006.

Some of the most famous names in stock car racing have raced at the Orange County Speedway, including Dale Earnhardt, Jeff Gordon, Mark Martin, Davey and Donnie Allison, Dale Jarrett, Jeff and Ward Burton, Elliott and Hermie Sadler, Scott Riggs, Michael Waltrip, Todd Bodine, Kyle Petty and Bobby Labonte. Some more recent notable drivers include Timothy Peters, Bubba Wallace, Ryan Blaney, Jeb Burton, Timmy Hill, Ryan Reed, Jesse Little and Gray Gaulding. David Pearson and Glen Wood raced at the speedway when it was a dirt track. The track currently runs a regular weekly show on the second and fourth Saturday night of each month, April through October. The facility also hosts the PASS Super Late Model series, CARS Super Late Model Tour and CARS Late Model Stock Tour.

== History ==
In 1966, the speedway underwent significant improvement, which is considered the actual launch date of the track. It opened as a 0.250 mi (0.402 km) dirt oval, but soon was increased to 0.625 mi (1.006 km) and remained until 1973.

In 1973, the track hosted one NASCAR Grand National East Series event.

In 1983, the speedway underwent more improvements. 19-degree banking was added in the turns and 16-degree banking in straightaways to assure more safety for drivers and exciting on-car movements for fans. At that time, the Orange County Speedway became known as “the fastest 3/8-mile race track in America".

In 1983, the NASCAR Busch Grand National Series (now O'Reilly Auto Parts Series) began running events at the speedway. Orange County Speedway was one of the first tracks in the area to have live televised Busch races; the first was the 1990 Roses Stores 200 on June 9, 1990.

Between 1986 and 1988, the facility hosted 5 NASCAR Whelen Modified Tour races. Also, the track hosted 3 NASCAR Southeast Series events between 1993 and 1999.

ASA National Tour ran 2 events at the speedway, between 1998 and 1999. And CARS X-1R Pro Cup Series ran 5 races at Orange County Speedway between 1997 and 2014.

At the start of 21st century, the track was in bad shape and attendance had been falling. Eventually the track was shut down in 2003. Then in March 2006, under a new management team, the track reopened. Volunteers put in time to rehabilitation of the speedway for the opening day. The event was a big success, with a large crowd for the first time in years.

== Major results ==
=== NASCAR Busch Grand National Series ===
The NASCAR Busch Grand National Series (now Xfinity Series) had 27 races at the speedway from 1983 until 1994.

Date	Race Name	Winning driver	Make	Average speed	Race length
June 18, 1983	L.D. Swain & Son 200	Jack Ingram	Pontiac	73.55 mph (118.37 km/h)	75 miles (121 km)
July 2, 1983	Mason Day Paving 200	Tommy Houston	Chevrolet	69.32 mph (111.56 km/h)	75 miles (121 km)
July 9, 1983	Mello Yello 200	Tommy Houston	Chevrolet	79.83 mph (128.47 km/h)	75 miles (121 km)
October 1, 1983	Solomon Enterprises 200	Sam Ard	Oldsmobile	77.08 mph (124.05 km/h)	75 miles (121 km)
April 21, 1984	Mason Day Paving 200	Jack Ingram	Pontiac	79.69 mph (128.25 km/h)	75 miles (121 km)
June 6, 1984	L.D. Swain & Son 200	Jack Ingram	Pontiac	74.18 mph (119.38 km/h)	75 miles (121 km)
July 7, 1984	Miller 200	Jack Ingram	Pontiac	69.23 mph (111.41 km/h)	75 miles (121 km)
June 15, 1985	Puryear Truck 150	Larry Pearson	Pontiac	71.66 mph (115.33 km/h)	56 miles (90 km)
September 28, 1985	Goody's 150	Jack Ingram	Pontiac	70.73 mph (113.83 km/h)	56 miles (90 km)
June 14, 1986	Poole Equipment 150	Tommy Houston	Buick	84.40 mph (135.83 km/h)	56 miles (90 km)
August 16, 1986	L.D. Swain 150	Dale Jarrett	Pontiac	52.56 mph (84.59 km/h)	56 miles (90 km)
September 28, 1986	Roses Stores 150	Larry Pearson	Pontiac	65.98 mph (106.18 km/h)	56 miles (90 km)
June 27, 1987	Poole Equipment 150	Mark Martin	Ford	64.88 mph (104.41 km/h)	56 miles (90 km)
August 15, 1987	Carpenter Chevy 150	Larry Pearson	Chevrolet	62.48 mph (100.55 km/h)	56 miles (90 km)
June 11, 1988	Roses Stores 150	Tommy Houston	Buick	84.83 mph (136.52 km/h)	56 miles (90 km)
August 13, 1988	Poole Equipment 150	Rick Mast	Buick	48.84 mph (78.60 km/h)	56 miles (90 km)
June 10, 1989	Roses Stores 200	Jimmy Spencer	Buick	72.06 mph (115.97 km/h)	75 miles (121 km)
August 12, 1989	Texas Pete 200	Robert Pressley	Oldsmobile	67.55 mph (108.71 km/h)	75 miles (121 km)
June 9, 1990	Roses Stores 200	Chuck Bown	Pontiac	65.98 mph (106.18 km/h)	75 miles (121 km)
August 11, 1990	Texas Pete 200	Chuck Bown	Pontiac	82.72 mph (133.12 km/h)	75 miles (121 km)
June 8, 1991	Roses Stores 300	Robert Pressley	Oldsmobile	72.53 mph (116.73 km/h)	113 miles (182 km)
August 10, 1991	Texas Pete 300	Jimmy Hensley	Oldsmobile	77.04 mph (123.98 km/h)	113 miles (182 km)
June 6, 1992	Roses Stores 300	Robert Pressley	Oldsmobile	66.94 mph (107.73 km/h)	113 miles (182 km)
August 8, 1992	Texas Pete 300	Jimmy Spencer	Oldsmobile	78.72 mph (126.69 km/h)	113 miles (182 km)
May 1, 1993	Roses Stores 300	Ward Burton	Buick	68.03 mph (109.48 km/h)	113 miles (182 km)
October 2, 1993	Polaroid 300	Hermie Sadler	Oldsmobile	60.59 mph (97.51 km/h)	113 miles (182 km)
April 30, 1994	Pantry Stores 300	Hermie Sadler	Chevrolet	70.29 mph (113.12 km/h)	113 miles (182 km)

==== Multiple winners (drivers) ====
Wins	Driver
5	Jack Ingram
4	Tommy Houston
3	Larry Pearson
3	Robert Pressley
2	Chuck Bown
2	Jimmy Spencer
2	Hermie Sadler

==== Multiple winners (makes) ====
Wins	Make
10	Pontiac
7	Oldsmobile
5	Buick
4	Chevrolet

- Only other car make to win was on June 27, 1987, Mark Martin won driving a Ford.

Zach Reaves on October 25th 2025 set the track record for the pure stock division, with a qualifying time of 16.325

==== Notable races ====
- 1986 L.D. Swain 150 - Dale Jarrett earned his first ever win in a NASCAR major series.
- 1986 Roses Stores 150 - This was Larry Pearson's only win on his way to his first Busch Championship. Also future Busch series Champion, Rob Moroso, made his NASCAR debut on his 18th birthday.
- 1987 Poole Equipment 150 - Mark Martin won the event, giving Ford its first and only Busch Series win at the track.
- 1989 Roses Stores 200 - Jimmy Spencer was dominant in the event driving a white sponsor-less #34 Buick. Spencer lead 190 of the 200 laps and lapped the field on his way to the win.
- 1990 Roses Stores 200 - This was the first live televised Busch race at Orange County Speedway. Jeff Burton got his first pole in the Busch Series, while Chuck Bown lead 106 laps on the way for the victory.
- 1991 Roses Stores 300 - Jeff Gordon earned his first career Busch series pole in this event. Shawna Robinson made her first career start as Robert Pressley took the win.
- 1991 Texas Pete 300 - Jimmy Hensley lapped the field on the way to victory. To date, this is the last time anyone lapped the field in a Busch Series race. Jack Ingram withdrew from this race after his son was killed the week before. Ingram never raced again in the Busch series.
- 1994 Pantry Stores 300 - The last Busch series race at Orange County Speedway. Some confusion arose at the end of the race on who had won. With two laps to go George Crenshaw blew his engine and poured oil on the track. Two of the leaders, Hermie Sadler and 3rd place Ricky Craven, got into the oil and spun out. Sadler recovered, but was passed for the lead by Dennis Setzer, who had moved into 2nd place, and took the white flag as the caution was displayed. NASCAR determined that Sadler had already taken the caution flag, declaring Sadler as the winner.

== Track champions ==
Year	Late Model Stock champion	Limited Sportsman/Charger champion	Pure Stock champion	Street Stock champion	Super Mini-Truck champion
1983	Roy Hendrick	x	x	x	x
1984	x	x	x	Phillip Walker	x
1985	David Blankenship	x	x	Phillip Walker	x
1986	Wayne Patterson	x	x	x	x
1987	Wayne Patterson	x	x	x	x
1988	Jay Fogleman	x	x	x	x
1989	Gilbert Hill	x	x	x	x
1990	Maurice Hill	x	x	x	x
1991	Barry Beggarly	x	x	x	x
1992	Wayne Patterson	x	x	x	x
1993	Barry Beggarly	x	x	x	x
1994	Barry Beggarly	x	x	x	x
1995	x	x	x	x	x
1996	x	x	x	x	x
1997	x	x	x	x	x
1998	x	x	x	x	x
1999	x	Donald Brace	x	x	x
2000	Barry Beggarly	Kenny Remington Sr.	x	x	x
2001	Frank Deiny Jr.	x	x	x	x
2002	Timothy Peters	x	x	x	x
2003	Timothy Peters	x	x	x	x
2004-2005	Track Closed	x	x	x	x
2006	Ronald Hill	Matt Lofton	Chuck Watkins	x	x
2007	Terry Dease	Brian Cole	Thomas Penny	x	x
2008	Stacy Puryear	Donald Brace	x	x	x
2009	David Triplett Jr.	Michael McGuire	Keith Langston	x	x
2010	Terry Dease	Justin Newlin	Jarrett Milam	x	x
2013	Craig Moore	Jerry Hinesley	Jarret Milam	x	x
2014	Chris Denny	x	x	x	x
2015	x	x	Danny Winstead	x	x
2016	Terry Dease	Boo Boo Dalton	Danny Winstead	Jared Gillis	John Comstock

== See also ==
- List of NASCAR tracks
