= Mike Chase =

American stock car racing driver (1952–2025)

- Born: April 17, 1952; Redding, California, U.S.
- Died: April 18, 2025 (aged 73)
- Achievements: 1994 NASCAR Winston Transcontinental Series Champion; 1987 NASCAR Featherlite Southwest Tour Champion
- Awards: 1990 NASCAR Winston West Series Rookie of the Year; West Coast Stock Car Hall of Fame (2010)

NASCAR Cup Series career
- 13 races run over 5 years
- Best finish: 47th (1991)
- First race: 1990 Banquet Frozen Foods 300 (Sonoma)
- Last race: 1994 Slick 50 500 (Phoenix)
Wins	Top tens	Poles
0	0	0

NASCAR O'Reilly Auto Parts Series career
- 4 races run over 2 years
- Best finish: 89th (2001)
- First race: 1986 Gatorade 200 (Darlington)
- Last race: 2001 NAPA Autocare 250 (Pikes Peak)
Wins	Top tens	Poles
0	0	0

NASCAR FedEx Freight Truck Series career
- 15 races run over 2 years
- Best finish: 30th (1995)
- First race: 1995 Pizza Plus 150 (Bristol)
- Last race: 1996 Carquest 420K (Las Vegas)
Wins	Top tens	Poles
0	0	0

ARCA Menards Series West career
- 71 races run over 14 years
- Best finish: 1st (1994)
- First race: 1975 Memorial 100 (Ascot Park)
- Last race: 1999 NASCAR Coca-Cola 500 (Motegi)
- First win: 1990 Spears Manufacturing 400 (Mesa Marin)
- Last win: 1995 Carquest Auto Parts / AC Sparkplug 250 (Mesa Marin)
Wins	Top tens	Poles
10	38	3
- Statistics up to date as of April 26, 2025.

Mike Chase (April 17, 1952 – April 18, 2025) was an American professional stock car racing driver. Winner of the 1994 series championship in the NASCAR Winston West Series, he also competed in the Winston Cup Series, Busch Series, and Craftsman Truck Series and worked for Penske Racing as a crewman.

== Background ==
Born in Redding, California, Chase moved to the Charlotte, North Carolina, area in 1993 to further his racing career.

Chase died on April 18, 2025, at the age of 73.

== Early career ==
Growing up competing at Shasta Speedway in his native California, Chase began competing in NASCAR touring series in the mid-1980s, winning the 1987 championship in the Featherlite Southwest Tour; Chase also made his debut in the Busch Series in 1986 at Darlington Raceway, finishing 32nd.

Chase ran full-time in the Winston West Series for the first time in 1990, where he won Rookie of the Year. This schedule included his debut in the Winston Cup Series, competing in a combination race at Sears Point Raceway; he finished 25th in the event. Chase would run selected races in Winston Cup over the next few years, in addition to selected Winston West events; his best finish in Cup came at Michigan International Speedway in 1990 where he finished 24th.

In addition to his racing career, in the early 1990s, Chase worked as the head of stock car racing for A. J. Foyt Enterprises; he planned to attempt to qualify for the Indianapolis 500 on two occasions with the team, but was not approved by USAC for competition.

== Brickyard and Trucks ==
In 1994, Chase qualified for the 1994 Brickyard 400, the inaugural stock car race at the Indianapolis Motor Speedway. The event, although on the Winston Cup Series schedule, was a combination race between Cup and the Winston West Series; despite running too slow to make the field for the race on time, Chase started 43rd in the event due to being eligible for a provisional starting spot as the then-current Winston West Series points leader. He came into the event with car No. 50 but another No. 50 car made the race in A. J. Foyt and Chase switched to No. 58 for the race. He finished 42nd in the race, being involved in an accident after completing 91 of the race's 160 laps.

Chase would go on to win the 1994 Winston West series championship, winning five times over the course of the season. (Note: The total of five wins includes Chase's 42nd place finish at the Brickyard 400; as the highest-finishing (and only) Winston West Series driver in the field for the combination race, he was credited with a victory in the West Series.) Chase moved to the Winston Cup Series in 1995, intending to run full-time for Rookie of the Year in the No. 32 Active Racing Chevrolet; however, after failing to qualify for the first race of the season, the Daytona 500, Chase was released by team owner Dean Myers and replaced by Jimmy Hensley.

Chase returned part-time to the West Series part-time for the remainder of 1995, winning twice, as well as running eight races in the SuperTruck Series, making his first race in the series at Bristol Motor Speedway for Chesrown Racing, where he finished 27th; later that year he replaced P. J. Jones in the No. 1 DieHard Chevrolet for team owner Scoop Vessels, posting a best finish of sixteenth in seven races.

In 1996, Chase returned to the renamed Craftsman Truck Series, driving for Steve Sellers Racing; driving in seven events for the team, he posted a best finish of thirteenth at Portland Speedway. Chase would run selected races in the Winston West Series in 1998, before returning to the series for a full season in 1999 with Green Light Racing; he failed to win a race but finished seventh in points.

Chase would run three races in the Busch Series for ST Motorsports in 2001, with a best finish of 27th; these would be his final races in NASCAR competition.

== After racing ==
After retiring from competition, Chase worked for several race teams, including Wood Brothers Racing; he worked for Penske Racing as a fabricator. Chase also worked as a crew chief in the Nationwide Series.

Chase was inducted into the West Coast Stock Car Hall of Fame in 2010.

== Motorsports career results ==
=== NASCAR ===
(key) (Bold – Pole position awarded by qualifying time. Italics – Pole position earned by points standings or practice time. * – Most laps led.)

==== Winston Cup Series ====
NASCAR Winston Cup Series results
Year	Team	No.	Make	1	2	3	4	5	6	7	8	9	10	11	12	13	14	15	16	17	18	19	20	21	22	23	24	25	26	27	28	29	30	31	NWCC	Pts	Ref
1990	Freymiller Racing	23	Buick	DAY	RCH	CAR	ATL	DAR	BRI	NWS	MAR	TAL	CLT	DOV	SON; 25	POC	MCH	DAY	POC	TAL	GLN										PHO; 39	ATL			57th	230	
1990	Tri-Star Motorsports	68	Pontiac																			MCH; 24	BRI	DAR	RCH	DOV	MAR	NWS	CLT	CAR					57th	230	
1991	Freymiller Racing	23	Ford	DAY	RCH	CAR	ATL	DAR	BRI	NWS	MAR	TAL	CLT	DOV	SON; 40	POC	MCH																		47th	356	
1991	A. J. Foyt Enterprises	14	Olds															DAY; 33	POC	TAL; 25	GLN	MCH; 29	BRI	DAR	RCH	DOV	MAR	NWS	CLT	CAR					47th	356	
1991	A. J. Foyt Enterprises	14	Chevy																												PHO; 26	ATL			47th	356	
1992	Kaylan Young Racing	60	Pontiac	DAY	CAR	RCH	ATL	DAR	BRI	NWS	MAR	TAL	CLT	DOV	SON; 35	POC	MCH	DAY	POC	TAL	GLN	MCH	BRI	DAR	RCH	DOV	MAR	NWS	CLT	CAR	PHO	ATL			84th	58	
1993	JTC Racing	50	Chevy	DAY	CAR	RCH	ATL	DAR	BRI	NWS	MAR	TAL	SON	CLT	DOV	POC	MCH	DAY	NHA	POC	TAL	GLN	MCH	BRI	DAR	RCH	DOV	MAR	NWS	CLT	CAR	PHO; 39	ATL		87th	46	
1994	JTC Racing	50	Chevy	DAY	CAR	RCH	ATL	DAR	BRI	NWS	MAR	TAL	SON; 31	CLT	DOV	POC	MCH	DAY	NHA	POC	TAL												PHO; 31	ATL	56th	177	
1994	JTC Racing	58	Chevy																			IND; 42	GLN	MCH	BRI	DAR	RCH	DOV	MAR	NWS	CLT	CAR			56th	177	
1995	Active Racing	32	Chevy	DAY; DNQ	CAR	RCH	ATL	DAR	BRI	NWS	MAR	TAL	SON	CLT	DOV	POC	MCH	DAY	NHA	POC	TAL	IND	GLN	MCH	BRI	DAR	RCH	DOV	MAR	NWS	CLT	CAR	PHO	ATL	72nd	0	

==== Busch Series ====
NASCAR Busch Series results
Year	Team	No.	Make	1	2	3	4	5	6	7	8	9	10	11	12	13	14	15	16	17	18	19	20	21	22	23	24	25	26	27	28	29	30	31	32	33	34	NBSC	Pts	Ref
1986	Clark Racing	06	Pontiac	DAY	CAR	HCY	MAR	BRI	DAR	SBO	LGY	JFC	DOV	CLT	SBO	HCY	OCS	IRP	SBO	RAL	OXF	SBO	HCY	LGY	OCS	BRI	DAR; 32	RCH	DOV	MAR	OCS	CLT	CAR	MAR				124th	67	
2001	ST Motorsports	91	Chevy	DAY	CAR	LVS	ATL	DAR	BRI	TEX	NSH	TAL	CAL; 43	RCH	NHA	NZH	CLT	DOV	KEN	MLW	GLN	CHI																89th	161	
2001	ST Motorsports	59	Chevy																				GTY; 27	PPR; 28	IRP	MCH	BRI	DAR	RCH	DOV	KAN	CLT	MEM	PHO	CAR	HOM		89th	161	
2002	ST Motorsports	59	Chevy	DAY	CAR	LVS	DAR	BRI	TEX	NSH; QL^{†}	TAL	CAL	RCH	NHA	NZH	CLT	DOV	NSH	KEN	MLW	DAY	CHI	GTY	PPR	IRP	MCH	BRI	DAR	RCH	DOV	KAN	CLT	MEM	ATL	CAR	PHO	HOM	155th	0	
^{†} - Qualified for Stacy Compton

==== Craftsman Truck Series ====
NASCAR Craftsman Truck Series results
Year	Team	No.	Make	1	2	3	4	5	6	7	8	9	10	11	12	13	14	15	16	17	18	19	20	21	22	23	24	NCTC	Pts	Ref
1995	Chesrown Racing	62	Chevy	PHO	TUS	SGS	MMR	POR	EVG	I70	LVL	BRI; 27	MLW	CNS	HPT	IRP												30th	767	
1995	Vestar Motorsports	1	Chevy														FLM; 24	RCH; 28	MAR; 18	NWS; 19	SON; 19	MMR; 28	PHO; 16					30th	767	
1996	Steve Sellers Racing	78	Ford	HOM; DNQ	PHO; 29	POR; 13	EVG; 19	TUS	CNS; 13	HPT; 33	BRI; 30	NZH	MLW	LVL	I70	IRP	FLM	GLN	NSV	RCH	NHA	MAR	NWS	SON	MMR	PHO	LVS; 26	35th	692	

==== Winston West Series ====
NASCAR Winston West Series results
Year	Team	No.	Make	1	2	3	4	5	6	7	8	9	10	11	12	13	14	15	16	17	18	19	20	21	22	NWWSC	Pts	Ref
1975	Kord Racing	94	Chevy	RSD	LAG	MSP	ASP; 5	RSD	ASP	USP	POR	EVG	SMS	CRS	CSP	ASP	EVG	YAK	POR	MSP	ONT					NA	70.25	
1978	Hal Callentine	74	Chevy	RSD	AAS	S99; 4	SHA; 19	PET	MMR	RSD	IFS	YAK	WSP	LSP	EVG	POR	CRS	ASP	SON	SHA	CBS	YAK	OSS	ONT	PHO	NA	79	
1980	Kieper Racing	98	Pontiac	RSD	ONT	S99	RSD	LAG	EVG	POR	SON	MMR	ONT	PHO; 15												NA	36	
1981	Unkown	21	Mercury	RSD	S99	AAS	MMR; 19	RSD	LAG	POR	WSP	EVG	SHA	RSD	SON	RSD	PHO									44th	32	
1982	Chase Racing	29	Buick	MMR; 19	S99	AAS	RSD	POR	WSP	SHA	EVG	SON	CDR	RSD	RSD	PHO										NA	NA	
1986	Stoke Racing	99	Chevy	SON	RSD	EVG; 7	RCS; 10	TAC	PIR	WSR; 18	RSD															21st	124	
1990	Freymiller Racing	23	Buick	MMR; 20	SON; 25	SGS; 6	**POR**; 7	EVG; 4	RAS; 6	TCR; 2*	MMR; 1	PHO; 39														3rd	1278	
1991	Freymiller Racing	23	Buick	EVG; 1*	MMR; 1*	SON; 40	SGS; 13	POR; 1	EVG; 35	SSS																9th	1172	
1991	A. J. Foyt Enterprises	14	Chevy								MMR; 13	PHO; 26														9th	1172	
1992	Kaylan Young Racing	60	Pontiac	MMR	SGS	SON; 35	SHA	POR																		18th	417	
1992	NorCal Motorsports	5	Ford						EVG; 14	SSS	CAJ	TWS	MMR; 7	PHO												18th	417	
1993	NorCal Motorsports	5	Ford	TWS	MMR; 6	SGS	SON	TUS	SHA	EVG	POR	CBS	SSS	CAJ												21st	570	
1993	JTC Racing	50	Chevy												TCR; 2	MMR; 26	PHO; 39									21st	570	
1994	JTC Racing	50	Chevy	MMR; 7	TUS; 1*	SON; 31	SGS; 2	YAK; 1	MMR; 1*	POR; 3		CAJ; 4	TCR; 1*	LVS; 17	MMR; 8	PHO; 31	TUS; 12*									1st	2190	
1994	JTC Racing	58	Chevy								IND; 42															1st	2190	
1995	Steve Sellers Racing	77	Ford	TUS	MMR; 11	SON	CNS; 1*	**MMR**; 1	POR; 20	SGS; 12	TUS; 12	AMP; 2	MAD	POR	LVS	SON	MMR	PHO								14th	1027	
1998	Green Light Racing	18	Chevy	TUS	LVS	PHO	CAL; 5	HPT	MMR	AMP	POR	CAL; 5	PPR	EVG	SON	MMR	**LVS**; 29									36th	391	
1999	Green Light Racing	18	Chevy	TUS; 6	LVS; 6	PHO; 2	CAL; 5	PPR; 5	MMR; 19	IRW; 18	EVG; 9	POR; 3	IRW; 26	RMR; 16	LVS; 10	MMR; 20	MOT; 25									7th	1838	

Sporting positions
Preceded by Rick Carelli	NASCAR Winston West Series champion 1994	Succeeded by Doug George
Preceded by Ron Esau	NASCAR Featherlite Southwest Tour Champion; 1987	Succeeded by Roman Calczynski
