= Gary Collins (racing driver) =

American racing driver (born 1960)

- Born: January 24, 1960 (age 66); Bakersfield, California, U.S.

NASCAR Cup Series career
- 4 races run over 4 years
- Best finish: 79th (1994)
- First race: 1988 Checker 500 (Phoenix)
- Last race: 1994 Save Mart Supermarkets 300 (Sonoma)
Wins	Top tens	Poles
0	0	0

NASCAR FedEx Freight Truck Series career
- 4 races run over 1 year
- Best finish: 42nd (1995)
- First race: 1995 Skoal Bandit Copper World Classic (Phoenix)
- Last race: 1995 Jerr Dan/Nelson 150 (Evergreen)
Wins	Top tens	Poles
0	1	0

ARCA Menards Series West career
- 43 races run over 14 years
- Best finish: 15th (1990, 1995)
- First race: 1988 American National Bank 200 (Mesa Marin)
- Last race: 2001 NAPA 300 (LVMS Bullring)
- First win: 1994 California 200 (Mesa Marin)
- Last win: 1997 Winston West 150 (Tucson)
Wins	Top tens	Poles
2	16	3
- Statistics up to date as of October 3, 2025.

Gary Collins (born January 24, 1960) is an American stock car racing driver. Now retired, he competed primarily in the NASCAR Winston West Series, however he also ran select races in the NASCAR Winston Cup Series and NASCAR Craftsman Truck Series, and was among the drivers selected to compete in the first NASCAR exhibition race held in Australia in 1988.

== Racing career ==
The son of Marion Collins, owner of Mesa Marin Raceway, Collins ran a total of four NASCAR Winston Cup Series races in his career; all four were combination races with the Winston West Series. His Winston Cup Series debut came at Phoenix International Raceway in the 1988 Checker 500, where he started 39th and finished 33rd in a family-owned Oldsmobile. He would run two more races at Phoenix, in 1990 and 1991, posting a best finish of 33rd in the 1990 event; his final Winston Cup start came at Sears Point International Raceway in the 1994 Save Mart Supermarkets 300, where he finished 40th while driving a Ford for Venable Racing.

Collins was one of the drivers selected to compete in the Goodyear NASCAR 500, the first exhibition race held by NASCAR in Australia; he set the tenth fastest time in qualifying, and finished nineteenth in the event, crashing out on lap 80.

During the winter of 1993, Collins and his family-owned race team constructed the first-ever prototype NASCAR SuperTruck Series presented by Craftsman chassis, demonstrating that the concept, developed by Collins in conjunction with off-road racing veterans Scoop Vessels and Jim Venable, was feasible. He was one of the drivers selected to compete in the four preliminary events that established the viability of the SuperTruck Series; in the second, held at Saugus Speedway, he was flagged the winner of the event, when the race was shortened five laps before its scheduled finish due to rain. In 1995, Collins also ran four of the first six SuperTruck Series events in a family-owned No. 74 Chevrolet, posting a best finish of tenth in his final race in the series at Evergreen Speedway.

In NASCAR's lower-level series, the Winston West Series, Collins won two races of 43 he competed in between 1988 and 2001; his wins came at Mesa Marin Raceway in 1994, driving for Venable, and at Tucson Speedway in 1997 while running for his family team. His best points finish in the series came in 1990 and 1995, when he finished fifteenth in the final standings, having competed in five and seven events respectively. Collins also ran a limited number of Featherlite Southwest Tour events, running eighteen races between 1987 and 1997, with a best finish of third at Mesa Marin in 1989.

Following his racing career, Collins joined NTS Motorsports, becoming director of competition for the team's efforts in the SRL Southwest Tour, the successor to the Featherlite Southwest Tour.

== Motorsports career results ==
=== NASCAR ===
(key) (Bold – Pole position awarded by qualifying time. Italics – Pole position earned by points standings or practice time. * – Most laps led.)

==== Winston Cup Series ====
NASCAR Winston Cup Series results
Year	Team	No.	Make	1	2	3	4	5	6	7	8	9	10	11	12	13	14	15	16	17	18	19	20	21	22	23	24	25	26	27	28	29	30	31	NSCC	Pts	Ref
1988	Collins Motorsports	24	Olds	DAY	RCH	CAR	ATL	DAR	BRI	NWS	MAR	TAL	CLT	DOV	RSD	POC	MCH	DAY	POC	TAL	GLN	MCH	BRI	DAR	RCH	DOV	MAR	CLT	NWS	CAR	PHO; 33	ATL			80th	64	
1990	Collins Motorsports	29	Olds	DAY	RCH	CAR	ATL	DAR	BRI	NWS	MAR	TAL	CLT	DOV	SON	POC	MCH	DAY	POC	TAL	GLN	MCH	BRI	DAR	RCH	DOV	MAR	NWS	CLT	CAR	PHO; 33	ATL			91st	64	
1991	Collins Motorsports	29	Olds	DAY	RCH	CAR	ATL	DAR	BRI	NWS	MAR	TAL	CLT	DOV	SON	POC	MCH	DAY	POC	TAL	GLN	MCH	BRI	DAR	RCH	DOV	MAR	NWS	CLT	CAR	PHO; 42	ATL			91st	37	
1994	Venable Racing	20	Ford	DAY	CAR	RCH	ATL	DAR	BRI	NWS	MAR	TAL	SON; 40	CLT	DOV	POC	MCH	DAY	NHA	POC	TAL	IND	GLN	MCH	BRI	DAR	RCH	DOV	MAR	NWS	CLT	CAR	PHO	ATL	79th	43	

==== SuperTruck Series ====
NASCAR SuperTruck Series results
Year	Team	No.	Make	1	2	3	4	5	6	7	8	9	10	11	12	13	14	15	16	17	18	19	20	NSTSC	Pts	Ref
1995	Collins Motorsports	74	Chevy	PHO; 20	TUS; 21	SGS	MMR; 20	POR	EVG; 10	I70	LVL	BRI	MLW	CNS	HPT	IRP	FLM	RCH	MAR	NWS	SON	MMR	PHO	42nd	440	

==== Winston West Series ====
NASCAR Winston West Series results
Year	Team	No.	Make	1	2	3	4	5	6	7	8	9	10	11	12	13	14	15	NWWSC	Pts	Ref
1988	Collins Motorsports	28	Olds	SON	MMR	RSD	SGP	POR	EVG	MMR; 11									31st	87	
1988	Collins Motorsports	24	Olds								PHO; 33								31st	87	
1989	Collins Motorsports	28	Olds	MAD	MMR	RAS	SON	POR	TCR	EVG; 16	MMR; 15	SGS	SON	PHO					29th	233	
1990	Collins Motorsports	28	Olds	MMR; 2	SON	SGS; 9	POR; 15	EVG	RAS	TCR	MMR; 14								15th	712	
1990	Collins Motorsports	29	Olds									PHO; 33							15th	712	
1991	Collins Motorsports	28	Olds	EVG	MMR; 5	SON	SGS	POR	EVG	SSS	MMR; 17								22nd	418	
1991	Collins Motorsports	29	Olds									PHO; 42							22nd	418	
1992	Collins Motorsports	28	Olds	**MMR**; INQ^{†}	SGS	SON	SHA	POR	EVG	SSS	CAJ	TWS							42nd	124	
1992	Collins Motorsports	20	Olds										MMR; 13	PHO					42nd	124	
1993	Collins Motorsports	28	Chevy	TWS	MMR; 22	SGS	SON	TUS	SHA	EVG	POR	CBS	SSS	CAJ	TCR	**MMR**; 27	PHO		36th	179	
1994	Venable Racing	28	Chevy	MMR; 1*	TUS; 4														21st	773	
1994	Venable Racing	20	Ford			SON; 40	SGS	YAK											21st	773	
1994	Venable Racing	28	Ford						**MMR**; 4	POR	IND	CAJ	TCR	LVS	MMR; 20	PHO	TUS		21st	773	
1995	Collins Motorsports	28	Ford	TUS	MMR	SON	CNS; 14												15th	953	
1995	Collins Motorsports	28	Chevy					MMR; 8	POR; 12	SGS	TUS; 3	AMP	MAD; 16	POR	LVS; 15	SON	MMR; 5	PHO	15th	953	
1996	Venable Racing	28	Chevy	TUS; 3	AMP; 9														18th	828	
1996	Venable Racing	28	Pontiac			MMR; 13	SON	MAD	POR										18th	828	
1996	Venable Racing	28	Ford							TUS; 7	EVG	CNS; 9	MAD; 17	MMR	SON	MMR	PHO	LVS	18th	828	
1997	Collins Motorsports	28	Chevy	**TUS**; 1*	AMP; 10	SON	TUS	MMR	LVS	CAL	EVG	POR	PPR; 16	AMP	SON	MMR; 23	LVS		24th	528	
1998	Collins Motorsports	28	Chevy	TUS; 3	LVS; 31	PHO	CAL	HPT	MMR; 25	AMP	POR	CAL	PPR	EVG	SON	MMR	LVS		40th	328	
1999	Collins Motorsports	28	Chevy	TUS	LVS	PHO	CAL	PPR	MMR	IRW	EVG	POR	IRW	RMR	LVS	MMR; 26	MOT		81st	85	
2000	Collins Motorsports	28	Chevy	PHO	MMR	LVS	CAL	LAG	IRW; 11	POR	EVG	IRW	RMR	MMR	IRW				53rd	130	
2001	Unknown	14	Chevy	PHO	LVS; 17	TUS	MMR	CAL	IRW	LAG	KAN	EVG	CNS	IRW	RMR	LVS	IRW		53rd	112	
^{†} – Qualified but replaced by Dirk Stephens
