= Jim Courage =

American racing driver (born 1947)

- Born: January 8, 1947 (age 79); Fair Oaks, California, U.S.

ARCA Menards Series West career
- 8 races run over 5 years
- Best finish: 34th (1994)
- First race: 1991 Winston 200 (Portland)
- Last race: 1997 Fry's Electronics/Iomega Zip 100 (Sonoma)
| Wins | Top tens | Poles |
|---|---|---|
| 0 | 2 | 0 |
- Statistics up to date as of May 9, 2025.

Jim Courage (born January 8, 1947) is an American former professional stock car racing driver. He competed in the NASCAR Winston West Series and NASCAR Featherlite Southwest Tour.

== Racing career ==
=== NASCAR Winston Cup Series ===
Courage attempted the 1989 Banquet Frozen Foods 300, but did not qualify for the race.

=== NASCAR Winston West Series ===
Courage attempted the 1989 Banquet Frozen Foods 300, a combination race with the Winston Cup Series, but did not qualify for the race. He made his West Series debut in 1991, driving for John Krebs at Portland Speedway. Courage competed in both races at Mesa Marin Raceway in 1992, failing to finish both due to issues. He competed in two races in 1993, scoring his first top-ten at Shasta Speedway despite failing to finish due to fatigue. He only competed in one event in 1994, finishing 11th at Saugus Spedway. He did not return to the series until 1997, making two starts and scoring a career-best ninth place finish at Altamont Motorsports Park.

=== NASCAR Featherlite Southwest Tour ===
Courage competed in a NASCAR Featherlite Southwest Tour race in 1989, finishing 17th at All American Speedway.

== Personal life ==
Courage married Marilyn Courage in the late 1960s. He has a son, Jim Courage Jr., who has also competed in racing, including a West Series race in 2006.

== Motorsport career results ==
=== NASCAR ===
(key) (Bold – Pole position awarded by qualifying time. Italics – Pole position earned by points standings or practice time. * – Most laps led.)

==== Winston Cup Series ====
NASCAR Winston Cup Series results
| Year | Team | No. | Make | 1 | 2 | 3 | 4 | 5 | 6 | 7 | 8 | 9 | 10 | 11 | 12 | 13 | 14 | 15 | 16 | 17 | 18 | 19 | 20 | 21 | 22 | 23 | 24 | 25 | 26 | 27 | 28 | 29 | NWCC | Pts | Ref |
|---|---|---|---|---|---|---|---|---|---|---|---|---|---|---|---|---|---|---|---|---|---|---|---|---|---|---|---|---|---|---|---|---|---|---|---|
| 1989 | Unknown | 41 | Chevy | DAY | CAR | ATL | RCH | DAR | BRI | NWS | MAR | TAL | CLT | DOV | SON; DNQ | POC | MCH | DAY | POC | TAL | GLN | MCH | BRI | DAR | RCH | DOV | MAR | CLT | NWS | CAR | PHO | ATL | NA | NA | |

==== Winston West Series ====
NASCAR Winston West Series results
| Year | Team | No. | Make | 1 | 2 | 3 | 4 | 5 | 6 | 7 | 8 | 9 | 10 | 11 | 12 | 13 | 14 | NWWC | Pts | Ref |
|---|---|---|---|---|---|---|---|---|---|---|---|---|---|---|---|---|---|---|---|---|
| 1989 | Unknown | 41 | Chevy | MAD | MMR | RAS | SON; DNQ | POR | TCR | EVG | MMR | SGS | SON | PHO | | | | NA | NA | |
| 1991 | Krebs Racing | 96 | Pontiac | EVG | MMR | SON | SGS | POR; 20 | EVG | SSS | MMR | PHO | | | | | | 50th | 103 | |
| 1992 | Diamond Ridge Racing | 2 | Pontiac | MMR; 17 | SGS | SON | SHA | POR | EVG | SSS | CAJ | TWS | | | | | | 27th | 230 | |
| 1992 | Sara Vincent | 41 | Buick | | | | | | | | | | MMR; 15 | PHO | | | | 27th | 230 | |
| 1993 | Adele Emerson | 49 | Pontiac | TWS | MMR; 19 | SGS | SON | TUS | | | | | | | | | | 34th | 240 | |
| 1993 | Adele Emerson | 99 | Pontiac | | | | | | SHA; 10 | EVG | POR | CBS | SSS | CAJ | TCR | MMR | PHO | 34th | 240 | |
| 1994 | Sellers Racing | 49 | Chevy | MMR | TUS | SON | SGS; 11 | YAK | MMR | POR | IND | CAJ | TCR | LVS | MMR | PHO | TUS | 47th | 130 | |
| 1997 | Sellers Racing | 41 | Chevy | TUS | AMP | SON | TUS | MMR | LVS | CAL | EVG | POR | PPR | AMP; 9 | SON; 16 | MMR | LVS | 42nd | 253 | |
