= 1993 Pontiac Excitement 400 =

Third race of the 1993 NASCAR Winston Cup Series

Race details
- Race 3 of 30 in the 1993 NASCAR Winston Cup Series
- The 1993 Pontiac Excitement 400 program cover, with artwork by NASCAR artist Sam Bass.
- Date: March 7, 1993
- Official name: 39th Annual Pontiac Excitement 400
- Location: Richmond, Virginia, Richmond International Raceway
- Course: Permanent racing facility
- Course length: 0.75 miles (1.207 km)
- Distance: 400 laps, 300 mi (482.803 km)
- Average speed: 107.709 miles per hour (173.341 km/h)
- Attendance: 70,000

Pole position
| Driver | Ken Schrader | Hendrick Motorsports |
- Time: 21.922

Most laps led
| Driver | Kyle Petty | SABCO Racing |
- Laps: 168

Winner
| No. 28 | Davey Allison | Robert Yates Racing |

Television in the United States
- Network: TBS
- Announcers: Ken Squier, Neil Bonnett

Radio in the United States
- Radio: Motor Racing Network

The 1993 Pontiac Excitement 400 was the third stock car race of the 1993 NASCAR Winston Cup Series season and the 39th iteration of the event. The race was held on Sunday, March 7, 1993, in Richmond, Virginia, at Richmond International Raceway, a 0.75 miles (1.21 km) D-shaped oval. The race took the scheduled 400 laps to complete. At race's end, Robert Yates Racing driver Davey Allison would manage to dominate the late stages of the race to take his 19th and eventual final career NASCAR Winston Cup Series victory and his only victory of the season. To fill out the top three, Penske Racing South driver Rusty Wallace and owner-driver Alan Kulwicki would finish second and third, respectively.

== Background ==
The layout of Richmond International Raceway, the venue where the race was at.

Richmond International Raceway (RIR) is a 3/4-mile (1.2 km), D-shaped, asphalt race track located just outside Richmond, Virginia in Henrico County. It hosts the NASCAR Cup Series, O'Reilly Auto Parts Series, and the Truck Series. Known as "America's premier short track", it formerly hosted an IndyCar Series race, and two USAC sprint car races.

=== Entry list ===
- (R) denotes rookie driver.

| # | Driver | Team | Make |
|---|---|---|---|
| 1 | Rick Mast | Precision Products Racing | Ford |
| 2 | Rusty Wallace | Penske Racing South | Pontiac |
| 3 | Dale Earnhardt | Richard Childress Racing | Chevrolet |
| 4 | Ernie Irvan | Morgan–McClure Motorsports | Chevrolet |
| 5 | Ricky Rudd | Hendrick Motorsports | Chevrolet |
| 6 | Mark Martin | Roush Racing | Ford |
| 7 | Alan Kulwicki | AK Racing | Ford |
| 8 | Sterling Marlin | Stavola Brothers Racing | Ford |
| 11 | Bill Elliott | Junior Johnson & Associates | Ford |
| 12 | Jimmy Spencer | Bobby Allison Motorsports | Ford |
| 14 | Terry Labonte | Hagan Racing | Chevrolet |
| 15 | Geoff Bodine | Bud Moore Engineering | Ford |
| 16 | Wally Dallenbach Jr. | Roush Racing | Ford |
| 17 | Darrell Waltrip | Darrell Waltrip Motorsports | Chevrolet |
| 18 | Dale Jarrett | Joe Gibbs Racing | Chevrolet |
| 21 | Morgan Shepherd | Wood Brothers Racing | Ford |
| 22 | Bobby Labonte (R) | Bill Davis Racing | Ford |
| 24 | Jeff Gordon (R) | Hendrick Motorsports | Chevrolet |
| 25 | Ken Schrader | Hendrick Motorsports | Chevrolet |
| 26 | Brett Bodine | King Racing | Ford |
| 27 | Hut Stricklin | Junior Johnson & Associates | Ford |
| 28 | Davey Allison | Robert Yates Racing | Ford |
| 30 | Michael Waltrip | Bahari Racing | Pontiac |
| 32 | Jimmy Horton | Active Motorsports | Chevrolet |
| 33 | Harry Gant | Leo Jackson Motorsports | Chevrolet |
| 40 | Kenny Wallace (R) | SABCO Racing | Pontiac |
| 41 | Phil Parsons | Larry Hedrick Motorsports | Chevrolet |
| 42 | Kyle Petty | SABCO Racing | Pontiac |
| 44 | Rick Wilson | Petty Enterprises | Pontiac |
| 45 | Rich Bickle | Terminal Trucking Motorsports | Ford |
| 52 | Jimmy Hensley | Jimmy Means Racing | Ford |
| 55 | Ted Musgrave | RaDiUs Motorsports | Ford |
| 61 | Rick Carelli | Chesrown Racing | Chevrolet |
| 68 | Bobby Hamilton | TriStar Motorsports | Ford |
| 71 | Dave Marcis | Marcis Auto Racing | Chevrolet |
| 75 | Dick Trickle | Butch Mock Motorsports | Ford |
| 83 | Lake Speed | Speed Racing | Ford |
| 90 | Bobby Hillin Jr. | Donlavey Racing | Ford |
| 98 | Derrike Cope | Cale Yarborough Motorsports | Ford |

== Qualifying ==
Qualifying was split into two rounds. The first round was held on Friday, March 4, at 3:00 PM EST. Each driver would have one lap to set a time. During the first round, the top 20 drivers in the round would be guaranteed a starting spot in the race. If a driver was not able to guarantee a spot in the first round, they had the option to scrub their time from the first round and try and run a faster lap time in a second round qualifying run, held on Saturday, March 5, at 11:00 AM EST. As with the first round, each driver would have one lap to set a time. For this specific race, positions 21-34 would be decided on time, and depending on who needed it, a select amount of positions were given to cars who had not otherwise qualified but were high enough in owner's points; up to two were given. If needed, a past champion who did not qualify on either time or provisionals could use a champion's provisional, adding one more spot to the field.

Ken Schrader, driving for Hendrick Motorsports, won the pole, setting a time of 21.922 and an average speed of 123.164 mph (198.213 km/h) in the first round.

Three drivers would fail to qualify.

=== Full qualifying results ===
| Pos. | # | Driver | Team | Make | Time | Speed |
|---|---|---|---|---|---|---|
| 1 | 25 | Ken Schrader | Hendrick Motorsports | Chevrolet | 21.922 | 123.164 |
| 2 | 1 | Rick Mast | Precision Products Racing | Ford | 21.942 | 123.052 |
| 3 | 21 | Morgan Shepherd | Wood Brothers Racing | Ford | 21.976 | 122.861 |
| 4 | 26 | Brett Bodine | King Racing | Ford | 21.982 | 122.828 |
| 5 | 17 | Darrell Waltrip | Darrell Waltrip Motorsports | Chevrolet | 21.986 | 122.805 |
| 6 | 7 | Alan Kulwicki | AK Racing | Ford | 22.007 | 122.688 |
| 7 | 42 | Kyle Petty | SABCO Racing | Pontiac | 22.048 | 122.460 |
| 8 | 24 | Jeff Gordon (R) | Hendrick Motorsports | Chevrolet | 22.063 | 122.377 |
| 9 | 18 | Dale Jarrett | Joe Gibbs Racing | Chevrolet | 22.067 | 122.355 |
| 10 | 4 | Ernie Irvan | Morgan–McClure Motorsports | Chevrolet | 22.090 | 122.227 |
| 11 | 3 | Dale Earnhardt | Richard Childress Racing | Chevrolet | 22.092 | 122.216 |
| 12 | 6 | Mark Martin | Roush Racing | Ford | 22.109 | 122.122 |
| 13 | 2 | Rusty Wallace | Penske Racing South | Pontiac | 22.120 | 122.061 |
| 14 | 28 | Davey Allison | Robert Yates Racing | Ford | 22.124 | 122.039 |
| 15 | 5 | Ricky Rudd | Hendrick Motorsports | Chevrolet | 22.133 | 121.990 |
| 16 | 55 | Ted Musgrave | RaDiUs Motorsports | Ford | 22.141 | 121.946 |
| 17 | 98 | Derrike Cope | Cale Yarborough Motorsports | Ford | 22.154 | 121.874 |
| 18 | 44 | Rick Wilson | Petty Enterprises | Pontiac | 22.191 | 121.671 |
| 19 | 14 | Terry Labonte | Hagan Racing | Chevrolet | 22.192 | 121.665 |
| 20 | 22 | Bobby Labonte (R) | Joe Gibbs Racing | Ford | 22.254 | 121.327 |
Failed to lock in Round 1
| 21 | 15 | Geoff Bodine | Bud Moore Engineering | Ford | 22.184 | 121.709 |
| 22 | 16 | Wally Dallenbach Jr. | Roush Racing | Ford | 22.267 | 121.256 |
| 23 | 8 | Sterling Marlin | Stavola Brothers Racing | Ford | 22.267 | 121.256 |
| 24 | 12 | Jimmy Spencer | Bobby Allison Motorsports | Ford | 22.280 | 121.185 |
| 25 | 11 | Bill Elliott | Junior Johnson & Associates | Ford | 22.288 | 121.141 |
| 26 | 30 | Michael Waltrip | Bahari Racing | Pontiac | 22.298 | 121.087 |
| 27 | 75 | Dick Trickle | Butch Mock Motorsports | Ford | 22.346 | 120.827 |
| 28 | 41 | Phil Parsons | Larry Hedrick Motorsports | Chevrolet | 22.350 | 120.805 |
| 29 | 71 | Dave Marcis | Marcis Auto Racing | Chevrolet | 22.360 | 120.751 |
| 30 | 90 | Bobby Hillin Jr. | Donlavey Racing | Ford | 22.368 | 120.708 |
| 31 | 83 | Lake Speed | Speed Racing | Ford | 22.414 | 120.460 |
| 32 | 40 | Kenny Wallace (R) | SABCO Racing | Pontiac | 22.419 | 120.434 |
| 33 | 27 | Hut Stricklin | Junior Johnson & Associates | Ford | 22.486 | 120.075 |
| 34 | 33 | Harry Gant | Leo Jackson Motorsports | Chevrolet | 22.495 | 120.027 |
Provisionals
| 35 | 68 | Bobby Hamilton | TriStar Motorsports | Ford | -* | -* |
| 36 | 52 | Jimmy Hensley | Jimmy Means Racing | Ford | -* | -* |
Failed to qualify
| 37 | 45 | Rich Bickle | Terminal Trucking Motorsports | Ford | -* | -* |
| 38 | 32 | Jimmy Horton | Active Motorsports | Chevrolet | -* | -* |
| 39 | 61 | Rick Carelli | Chesrown Racing | Chevrolet | -* | -* |
Official first round qualifying results
Official starting lineup

== Race results ==
| Fin | St | # | Driver | Team | Make | Laps | Led | Status | Pts | Winnings |
|---|---|---|---|---|---|---|---|---|---|---|
| 1 | 14 | 28 | Davey Allison | Robert Yates Racing | Ford | 400 | 155 | running | 180 | $70,125 |
| 2 | 13 | 2 | Rusty Wallace | Penske Racing South | Pontiac | 400 | 0 | running | 170 | $31,550 |
| 3 | 6 | 7 | Alan Kulwicki | AK Racing | Ford | 400 | 0 | running | 165 | $39,225 |
| 4 | 9 | 18 | Dale Jarrett | Joe Gibbs Racing | Chevrolet | 400 | 0 | running | 160 | $29,050 |
| 5 | 7 | 42 | Kyle Petty | SABCO Racing | Pontiac | 400 | 168 | running | 165 | $21,600 |
| 6 | 8 | 24 | Jeff Gordon (R) | Hendrick Motorsports | Chevrolet | 400 | 0 | running | 150 | $14,700 |
| 7 | 12 | 6 | Mark Martin | Roush Racing | Ford | 400 | 0 | running | 146 | $18,150 |
| 8 | 5 | 17 | Darrell Waltrip | Darrell Waltrip Motorsports | Chevrolet | 400 | 51 | running | 147 | $18,100 |
| 9 | 34 | 33 | Harry Gant | Leo Jackson Motorsports | Chevrolet | 400 | 0 | running | 138 | $17,300 |
| 10 | 11 | 3 | Dale Earnhardt | Richard Childress Racing | Chevrolet | 399 | 0 | running | 134 | $17,000 |
| 11 | 10 | 4 | Ernie Irvan | Morgan–McClure Motorsports | Chevrolet | 399 | 0 | running | 130 | $16,800 |
| 12 | 21 | 15 | Geoff Bodine | Bud Moore Engineering | Ford | 399 | 1 | running | 132 | $13,300 |
| 13 | 24 | 12 | Jimmy Spencer | Bobby Allison Motorsports | Ford | 398 | 0 | running | 124 | $12,850 |
| 14 | 3 | 21 | Morgan Shepherd | Wood Brothers Racing | Ford | 398 | 18 | running | 126 | $12,650 |
| 15 | 15 | 5 | Ricky Rudd | Hendrick Motorsports | Chevrolet | 398 | 0 | running | 118 | $13,035 |
| 16 | 28 | 41 | Phil Parsons | Larry Hedrick Motorsports | Chevrolet | 398 | 0 | running | 115 | $9,275 |
| 17 | 16 | 55 | Ted Musgrave | RaDiUs Motorsports | Ford | 397 | 0 | running | 112 | $12,075 |
| 18 | 33 | 27 | Hut Stricklin | Junior Johnson & Associates | Ford | 396 | 0 | running | 109 | $11,825 |
| 19 | 17 | 98 | Derrike Cope | Cale Yarborough Motorsports | Ford | 396 | 0 | running | 106 | $11,500 |
| 20 | 1 | 25 | Ken Schrader | Hendrick Motorsports | Chevrolet | 396 | 7 | running | 108 | $15,325 |
| 21 | 27 | 75 | Dick Trickle | Butch Mock Motorsports | Ford | 395 | 0 | running | 100 | $6,225 |
| 22 | 35 | 68 | Bobby Hamilton | TriStar Motorsports | Ford | 395 | 0 | running | 97 | $8,100 |
| 23 | 26 | 30 | Michael Waltrip | Bahari Racing | Pontiac | 394 | 0 | running | 94 | $10,975 |
| 24 | 19 | 14 | Terry Labonte | Hagan Racing | Chevrolet | 394 | 0 | running | 91 | $10,850 |
| 25 | 18 | 44 | Rick Wilson | Petty Enterprises | Pontiac | 394 | 0 | running | 88 | $7,700 |
| 26 | 32 | 40 | Kenny Wallace (R) | SABCO Racing | Pontiac | 394 | 0 | running | 85 | $6,525 |
| 27 | 22 | 16 | Wally Dallenbach Jr. | Roush Racing | Ford | 393 | 0 | running | 82 | $7,600 |
| 28 | 30 | 90 | Bobby Hillin Jr. | Donlavey Racing | Ford | 392 | 0 | running | 79 | $5,975 |
| 29 | 20 | 22 | Bobby Labonte (R) | Joe Gibbs Racing | Ford | 382 | 0 | running | 76 | $5,950 |
| 30 | 31 | 83 | Lake Speed | Speed Racing | Ford | 359 | 0 | running | 73 | $5,920 |
| 31 | 23 | 8 | Sterling Marlin | Stavola Brothers Racing | Ford | 337 | 0 | running | 70 | $10,475 |
| 32 | 4 | 26 | Brett Bodine | King Racing | Ford | 327 | 0 | running | 67 | $10,445 |
| 33 | 25 | 11 | Bill Elliott | Junior Johnson & Associates | Ford | 227 | 0 | engine | 64 | $16,260 |
| 34 | 36 | 52 | Jimmy Hensley | Jimmy Means Racing | Ford | 190 | 0 | clutch | 61 | $5,850 |
| 35 | 2 | 1 | Rick Mast | Precision Products Racing | Ford | 68 | 0 | engine | 58 | $11,375 |
| 36 | 29 | 71 | Dave Marcis | Marcis Auto Racing | Chevrolet | 54 | 0 | engine | 55 | $7,350 |
Official race results

== Standings after the race ==
Drivers' Championship standings

| | Pos | Driver | Points |
|---|---|---|---|
| 1 | 1 | Dale Jarrett | 490 |
| 1 | 2 | Dale Earnhardt | 489 (-1) |
| 1 | 3 | Mark Martin | 456 (-34) |
| 1 | 4 | Geoff Bodine | 445 (–45) |
| 3 | 5 | Rusty Wallace | 422 (–68) |
| 3 | 6 | Alan Kulwicki | 415 (–75) |
| 2 | 7 | Hut Stricklin | 398 (–92) |
| 10 | 8 | Davey Allison | 385 (–105) |
| 3 | 9 | Ted Musgrave | 381 (–109) |
| 6 | 10 | Jeff Gordon | 371 (–119) |
Official driver's standings

- Note: Only the first 10 positions are included for the driver standings.

| Previous race: 1993 GM Goodwrench 500 | NASCAR Winston Cup Series; 1993 season | Next race: 1993 Motorcraft Quality Parts 500 |
