= 1995 Ford Credit 125 =

Race details
- Race 4 of 20 in the 1995 NASCAR SuperTruck Series presented by Craftsman season
- Date: April 22, 1995
- Location: Mesa Marin Raceway in Bakersfield, California
- Course: Permanent racing facility
- Course length: 0.500 miles (0.805 km)
- Distance: 125 laps, 62.5 mi (100.58 km)
- Average speed: 71.090 mph (114.408 km/h)

Pole position
Driver	Mike Skinner	Richard Childress Racing
- Time: 19.813 sec

Most laps led
Driver	Ron Hornaday Jr.	Dale Earnhardt, Inc.
- Laps: 106

Winner
No. 16	Ron Hornaday Jr.	Dale Earnhardt, Inc.

Television in the United States
- Network: ABC
- Announcers: Paul Page and Jack Arute

The 1995 Ford Credit 125 was a NASCAR SuperTruck Series presented by Craftsman race held at Mesa Marin Raceway in Bakersfield, California on April 22, 1995. The fourth of 20 races in the series' inaugural season, it was the first race of the series to air on network television, and was also the shortest race, at 62.5 miles (100.6 km), in series history; it was won by Ron Hornaday Jr.

== Report ==
Pole position for the race was won by Mike Skinner, who was the fastest in qualifying for the third time in the series' four races to that point. P. J. Jones qualified second, while Bill Sedgwick, Dave Rezendes and Jack Sprague filled out the top five qualifying spots. Thirty-five trucks attempted to qualify for the thirty-truck starting grid; Steve McEachern, Jerry Glanville, Mike Hurlbert, Bob Jones and T. J. Clark failed to qualify for the event.

The race distance of 62.5 miles (100.6 km) was the shortest in the series' history. The race was won by Ron Hornaday Jr., driving the No. 16 Chevrolet for Dale Earnhardt, Inc.; Hornaday led 106 of the race's 125 laps, and won by 1.3 seconds over Bill Sedgwick. Mike Bliss, polesitter Mike Skinner and Butch Miller completed the top five finishers, while Jack Sprague, Bob Keselowski, Joe Ruttman, Scott Lagasse and Sammy Swindell rounded out the top ten. Nine trucks finished on the lead lap; four caution flags slowed the event for 18 laps. All but one of the 30 trucks that started the race finished the event, the No. 2 of Dave Ashley dropping out of the race after 77 laps with engine failure. The event, aired on ABC, was the first SuperTruck Series event to be aired on a national broadcast network.

== Results ==
Pos	Grid	No.	Driver	Team	Manufacturer	Laps	Points
1	6	16	Ron Hornaday Jr.	Dale Earnhardt, Inc.	Chevrolet	125	180
2	3	75	Bill Sedgwick	Spears Motorsports	Chevrolet	125	170
3	17	08	Mike Bliss	Ultra Motorsports	Ford	125	165
4	1	3	Mike Skinner	Richard Childress Racing	Chevrolet	125	160
5	23	98	Butch Miller	Liberty Racing	Ford	125	155
6	5	31	Jack Sprague	Griffin Racing	Chevrolet	125	150
7	9	29	Bob Keselowski	K-Automotive Motorsports	Dodge	125	146
8	10	84	Joe Ruttman	Irvan-Simo Racing	Ford	125	142
9	24	24	Scott Lagasse	Hendrick Motorsports	Chevrolet	125	138
10	7	38	Sammy Swindell	Akins-Sutton Motorsports	Ford	124	134
11	21	37	Bob Strait	Strait Racing	Ford	124	130
12	11	6	Rick Carelli	Chesrown Racing	Chevrolet	124	127
13	13	21	Tobey Butler	Venable Racing	Ford	124	124
14	2	1	P. J. Jones	Vestar Motorsports	Chevrolet	124	121
15	26	14	John Kinder	Stroppe Motorsports	Ford	124	118
16	8	25	Roger Mears	Hendrick Motorsports	Chevrolet	123	115
17	30	51	Kerry Teague	Rosenblum Racing	Chevrolet	123	112
18	20	10	Stan Fox	Decuir Motorsports	Chevrolet	123	109
19	4	7	Dave Rezendes	Geoff Bodine Racing	Ford	123	106
20	16	74	Gary Collins	Gary Collins Racing	Chevrolet	122	103
21	12	83	Steve Portenga	L&M Racing	Chevrolet	122	100
22	19	58	Wayne Jacks	Wayne Jacks Racing	Chevrolet	121	97
23	29	88	Jerry Churchill	Churchill Racing	Ford	121	94
24	24	57	Bob Walker	Raul Flores Racing	Chevrolet	121	91
25	15	89	Troy Beebe	Redding Motorsports	Chevrolet	119	88
26	22	87	John Nemechek	NEMCO Motorsports	Chevrolet	119	85
27	28	20	Walker Evans	Walker Evans Racing	Dodge	114	82
28	14	99	Pancho Carter	Enerjetix Motorsports	Chevrolet	111	79
29	18	06	Butch Gilliland	Ultra Motorsports	Ford	111	76
30	24	2	Dave Ashley	Ultra Motorsports	Ford	77	73
