= 1994 NASCAR Winston Transcontinental Series =

40th season of the NASCAR Winston Transcontinental Series

The 1994 NASCAR Winston Transcontinental Series, often referred to as the NASCAR Winston West Series, was the 41st season of the series. It was the only season of the ARCA Menards Series West to be run under the Winston Transcontinental Series banner, and the series would revert to being called the Winston West Series the following year. The title was won by Mike Chase, his first in the series.

== Schedule and results ==
The 1994 season included 14 individual races, although Mesa Marin Raceway hosted three races and Tucson Raceway Park hosted two races. The races at Sears Point Raceway, Indianapolis Motor Speedway, and Phoenix International Raceway were in combination with the NASCAR Winston Cup Series. The season finale was not the combination race at Phoenix like in past seasons but rather a standalone race at Tucson as part of the inaugural Winter Heat Series.

Date	Name	Racetrack	Location	Winner
March 24	California 200	Mesa Marin Raceway	Bakersfield, California	Gary Collins
March 30	Valvoline/Pit Lube 200	Tucson Raceway Park	Tucson, Arizona	Mike Chase
May 15	Save Mart Supermarkets 300	Sears Point Raceway	Sonoma, California	Ernie Irvan
May 28	Valencia Dodge 200	Saugus Speedway	Saugus, California	Ron Hornaday Jr.
June 11	Hahn Motor Company 200	Yakima Speedway	Yakima, Washington	Mike Chase
June 18	Channellock Tools 250	Mesa Marin Raceway	Bakersfield, California	Mike Chase
July 3	Talk 'N Toss 200	Portland Speedway	Portland, Oregon	Rick Carelli
August 6	Brickyard 400	Indianapolis Motor Speedway	Speedway, Indiana	Jeff Gordon
August 20	Winston 200	Cajon Speedway	Santee, California	Ron Hornaday Jr.
September 3	Winston 200	Tri-City Raceway	West Richland, Washington	Mike Chase
September 17	Las Vegas Events 200	The Bullring at Las Vegas Motor Speedway	Las Vegas, Nevada	Ron Hornaday Jr.
October 16	Spears Manufacturing 300	Mesa Marin Raceway	Bakersfield, California	Ken Schrader
October 30	Slick 50 500	Phoenix International Raceway	Avondale, Arizona	Terry Labonte
November 27	Winter Heat #2	Tucson Raceway Park	Tucson, Arizona	Ron Hornaday Jr.

== Full Drivers' Championship ==
(key) Bold – Pole position awarded by time. Italics – Pole position set by owner's points. * – Most laps led. † – Ineligible for West Series points

Pos	Driver	MMR	TUS	SON	SGS	YAK	MMR	POR	IND	CAJ	TCR	LVS	MMR	PHO	TUS	Pts
1	Mike Chase	7	1*	31	2	1	1*	3	42	4	1*	17	8	31	12*	2190
2	Ron Hornaday Jr.	8	10	39	**1***	2*	3	**2***	DNQ	1*	16	**1***	14*	34	**1**	2167
3	John Krebs	2	2	42	3	5	7	4	DNQ	5	2	14	16	DNQ		2016
4	Jeff Davis	23	6	DNQ	5	7	12	5	DNQ	8	4	6	5	DNQ	5	1958
5	Doug George	6	11	DNQ	4	**18**	2	8		3	14	2	2	DNQ	8	1932
6	Joe Heath	11	8	DNQ	9	10	5	24	DNQ	6	6	3	17	DNQ	9	1812
7	Wayne Jacks	4	13	DNQ	8	12	6	7	DNQ	11		5	23	DNQ	7	1768
8	Jack Sellers	21	22	DNQ	13	15	13	12	DNQ	9	7	16	9		11	1611
9	Rich Woodland Jr.	10	16	DNQ	6		8		DNQ	15		8	15	DNQ	18	1430
10	Chuck Welch	14	17		10	11	11	11		10	12	9	11		10	1420
11	Tom Taylor		24		12	13	15	15		12	15	18	29		13	1132
12	Larry Gunselman	19	20			8		16			11	7	3		15	1025
13	Lance Wade	9	7			6		19	DNQ		**3**			DNQ		969
14	St. James Davis	26	23		18	20				14		22	26	DNQ		906
15	Butch Gilliland	**3**	**9**	27	17	3	16									885
16	Steve Sellers	15				16		18	DNQ			10	6		17	872
17	Scott Gaylord	16		DNQ				6	DNQ				7	DNQ		862
18	Bobby Goodwin Jr.	13	18		7		9			7		20	24			857
19	Rick Carelli			41				1	DNQ				10	33		804
20	P. J. Jones									**2**	5	21	25	29	23	787
21	Gary Collins	1*	4	40			**4**						20			773
22	Bill McAnally	18	12							17		12	4		16	755
23	Rick Scribner	22	21		15					13			21		22	636
24	Hershel McGriff	12	15					9	DNQ							625
25	Jimmy Dick	17	5		16		17			16						609
26	Pappy Pryor							22			10	15	DNQ		19	528
27	L.J. Pryor	24	19			19		23					22			494
28	Larry Gaylord					17		13			13	19				466
29	Tobey Butler	5	3	DNQ												447
30	Robert Sprague					4		21	DNQ							389
31	Dan Obrist							17				11	12			369
32	John Sahm										17	13	13			360
33	Rich DeLong Jr.				14		10									349
34	Pete Graham	20					14						19			330
35	Ron Jacks									18					3	274
36	Kevin Culver					9		10								272
37	Ed Watson					14					9					259
38	Ross Kusah							20			8					245
39	Tim McCauley												18		14	230
40	Bob Howard												27		21	182
41	Ken Schrader			9†					7†				**1**	15†		180
42	Ron Esau														2	175
43	Garrett Evans														4	165
44	Chris Trickle											4				160
45	Ernie Cope														6	150
46	Charlie O'Brien			DNQ												134
47	Jim Courage				11											130
48	Rob MacCachren		14													121
49	Terry Fisher							14								121
50	Frank Adamo						18									109
51	Pat Lally						19									106
52	Gary Bechtel						20									103
53	Kenny Smith														20	103
54	Rick Strauser														24	91
55	Jon Dalmelsether	25														88
56	Steve Bare												28			79

== See also ==
- 1994 NASCAR Winston Cup Series
- 1994 NASCAR Busch Series
- 1994–95 NASCAR SuperTruck Series exhibition races
