= 1994 Slick 50 500 =

30th race of the 1994 NASCAR Winston Cup Series

Race details
- Race 30 of 31 in the 1994 NASCAR Winston Cup Series
- The 1994 Slick 50 500 program cover, featuring Jeff Gordon.
- Date: October 30, 1994
- Official name: 7th Annual Slick 50 500
- Location: Avondale, Arizona, Phoenix International Raceway
- Course: Permanent racing facility
- Course length: 1 miles (1.609 km)
- Distance: 312 laps, 312 mi (502.115 km)
- Average speed: 107.463 miles per hour (172.945 km/h)
- Attendance: 96,000

Pole position
Driver	Sterling Marlin	Morgan–McClure Motorsports
- Time: 27.728

Most laps led
Driver	Terry Labonte	Hendrick Motorsports
- Laps: 112

Winner
No. 5	Terry Labonte	Hendrick Motorsports

Television in the United States
- Network: TNN
- Announcers: Mike Joy, Buddy Baker, David Pearson

Radio in the United States
- Radio: Motor Racing Network

The 1994 Slick 50 500 was the 30th and penultimate stock car race of the 1994 NASCAR Winston Cup Series season, the 30th and penultimate race of the 1994 NASCAR Winston Transcontinental Series, and the seventh iteration of the event. The race was held on Sunday, October 30, 1994, before an audience of 96,000 in Avondale, Arizona at Phoenix International Raceway, a 1-mile (1.6 km) permanent low-banked tri-oval race track. The race took the scheduled 312 laps to complete. At race's end, Hendrick Motorsports driver Terry Labonte would manage to dominate the late stages of the race to take his 14th career NASCAR Winston Cup Series victory and his third and final victory of the season. To fill out the top three, Roush Racing driver Mark Martin and Morgan–McClure Motorsports driver Sterling Marlin would finish second and third, respectively.

== Background ==
The layout of Phoenix International Raceway, the venue where the race was held.

Phoenix International Raceway is a one-mile, low-banked tri-oval race track located in Avondale, Arizona. It is named after the nearby metropolitan area of Phoenix. The motorsport track opened in 1964 and currently hosts two NASCAR race weekends annually. PIR has also hosted the IndyCar Series, CART, USAC and the Rolex Sports Car Series. The raceway is currently owned and operated by International Speedway Corporation.

The raceway was originally constructed with a 2.5 mi (4.0 km) road course that ran both inside and outside of the main tri-oval. In 1991 the track was reconfigured with the current 1.51 mi (2.43 km) interior layout. PIR has an estimated grandstand seating capacity of around 67,000. Lights were installed around the track in 2004 following the addition of a second annual NASCAR race weekend.

=== Entry list ===
- (R) denotes rookie driver.

#	Driver	Team	Make
00	Scott Gaylord	Oliver Racing	Ford
1	Rick Mast	Precision Products Racing	Ford
2	Rusty Wallace	Penske Racing South	Ford
02	Brad Noffsinger	Taylor Racing	Ford
3	Dale Earnhardt	Richard Childress Racing	Chevrolet
4	Sterling Marlin	Morgan–McClure Motorsports	Chevrolet
5	Terry Labonte	Hendrick Motorsports	Chevrolet
6	Mark Martin	Roush Racing	Ford
06	P. J. Jones	Ultra Motorsports	Ford
7	Geoff Bodine	Geoff Bodine Racing	Ford
8	Jeff Burton (R)	Stavola Brothers Racing	Ford
10	Ricky Rudd	Rudd Performance Motorsports	Ford
11	Bill Elliott	Junior Johnson & Associates	Ford
12	Derrike Cope	Bobby Allison Motorsports	Ford
15	Lake Speed	Bud Moore Engineering	Ford
16	Ted Musgrave	Roush Racing	Ford
17	Darrell Waltrip	Darrell Waltrip Motorsports	Chevrolet
18	Dale Jarrett	Joe Gibbs Racing	Chevrolet
19	Loy Allen Jr. (R)	TriStar Motorsports	Ford
21	Morgan Shepherd	Wood Brothers Racing	Ford
22	Bobby Labonte	Bill Davis Racing	Pontiac
22W	St. James Davis	St. James Racing	Pontiac
23	Hut Stricklin	Travis Carter Enterprises	Ford
24	Jeff Gordon	Hendrick Motorsports	Chevrolet
25	Ken Schrader	Hendrick Motorsports	Chevrolet
26	Brett Bodine	King Racing	Ford
27	Jimmy Spencer	Junior Johnson & Associates	Ford
28	Ernie Irvan	Robert Yates Racing	Ford
29	Steve Grissom (R)	Diamond Ridge Motorsports	Chevrolet
30	Michael Waltrip	Bahari Racing	Pontiac
31	Ward Burton (R)	A.G. Dillard Motorsports	Chevrolet
32	Dick Trickle	Active Motorsports	Chevrolet
33	Harry Gant	Leo Jackson Motorsports	Chevrolet
37	Doug George	Olson Technology Racing	Ford
39	Rich Bickle	Roulo Brothers Racing	Chevrolet
40	Bobby Hamilton	SABCO Racing	Pontiac
41	Joe Nemechek (R)	Larry Hedrick Motorsports	Chevrolet
42	Kyle Petty	SABCO Racing	Pontiac
43	John Andretti (R)	Petty Enterprises	Pontiac
50	Mike Chase	JTC Racing	Chevrolet
51	Jeff Purvis	Phoenix Racing	Chevrolet
58	Wayne Jacks	Jacks Motorsports	Pontiac
61	Rick Carelli	Chesrown Racing	Chevrolet
71	Dave Marcis	Marcis Auto Racing	Chevrolet
75	Todd Bodine	Butch Mock Motorsports	Ford
76	Ron Hornaday Jr.	Spears Motorsports	Chevrolet
77	Greg Sacks	U.S. Motorsports Inc.	Ford
81	Jeff Davis	Jeff Davis Racing	Ford
86	Rich Woodland Jr.	Woodland Racing	Chevrolet
90	Mike Wallace (R)	Donlavey Racing	Ford
90W	Joe Heath	Heath Racing	Ford
92	John Krebs	Krebs Racing	Chevrolet
95	Lance Wade	Wade Racing	Ford
98	Jeremy Mayfield (R)	Cale Yarborough Motorsports	Ford

== Qualifying ==
Qualifying was split into two rounds. The first round was held on Friday, October 28, at 6:00 PM EST. Each driver would have one lap to set a time. During the first round, the top 20 drivers in the round would be guaranteed a starting spot in the race. If a driver was not able to guarantee a spot in the first round, they had the option to scrub their time from the first round and try and run a faster lap time in a second round qualifying run, held on Saturday, October 29, at 4:00 PM EST. As with the first round, each driver would have one lap to set a time. For this specific race, positions 21-40 would be decided on time, and depending on who needed it, a select amount of positions were given to cars who had not otherwise qualified but were high enough in owner's points; which was two for cars in the NASCAR Winston Cup Series and one extra provisional for the NASCAR Winston West Series. If needed, a past champion who did not qualify on either time or provisionals could use a champion's provisional, adding one more spot to the field.

Sterling Marlin, driving for Morgan–McClure Motorsports, would win the pole, setting a time of 27.728 and an average speed of 129.833 miles per hour (208.946 km/h) in the first round.

11 drivers would fail to qualify.

=== Full qualifying results ===
Pos.	#	Driver	Team	Make	Time	Speed
1	4	Sterling Marlin	Morgan–McClure Motorsports	Chevrolet	27.728	129.833
2	2	Rusty Wallace	Penske Racing South	Ford	27.866	129.190
3	11	Bill Elliott	Junior Johnson & Associates	Ford	27.905	129.009
4	10	Ricky Rudd	Rudd Performance Motorsports	Ford	27.911	128.981
5	18	Dale Jarrett	Joe Gibbs Racing	Chevrolet	27.927	128.908
6	6	Mark Martin	Roush Racing	Ford	27.980	128.663
7	25	Ken Schrader	Hendrick Motorsports	Chevrolet	28.000	128.571
8	3	Dale Earnhardt	Richard Childress Racing	Chevrolet	28.002	128.562
9	26	Brett Bodine	King Racing	Ford	28.017	128.493
10	15	Lake Speed	Bud Moore Engineering	Ford	28.043	128.374
11	28	Kenny Wallace	Robert Yates Racing	Ford	28.068	128.260
12	16	Ted Musgrave	Roush Racing	Ford	28.078	128.214
13	21	Morgan Shepherd	Wood Brothers Racing	Ford	28.086	128.178
14	24	Jeff Gordon	Hendrick Motorsports	Chevrolet	28.110	128.068
15	42	Kyle Petty	SABCO Racing	Pontiac	28.114	128.050
16	41	Joe Nemechek (R)	Larry Hedrick Motorsports	Chevrolet	28.118	128.032
17	43	John Andretti	Petty Enterprises	Pontiac	28.121	128.018
18	17	Darrell Waltrip	Darrell Waltrip Motorsports	Chevrolet	28.152	127.877
19	5	Terry Labonte	Hendrick Motorsports	Chevrolet	28.164	127.823
20	27	Jimmy Spencer	Junior Johnson & Associates	Ford	28.192	127.696
Failed to lock in Round 1
21	1	Rick Mast	Precision Products Racing	Ford	28.158	127.850
22	12	Derrike Cope	Bobby Allison Motorsports	Ford	28.194	127.687
23	75	Todd Bodine	Butch Mock Motorsports	Ford	28.200	127.660
24	33	Harry Gant	Leo Jackson Motorsports	Chevrolet	28.212	127.605
25	30	Michael Waltrip	Bahari Racing	Pontiac	28.221	127.565
26	90	Mike Wallace (R)	Donlavey Racing	Ford	28.251	127.429
27	31	Ward Burton (R)	A.G. Dillard Motorsports	Chevrolet	28.268	127.352
28	22	Bobby Labonte	Bill Davis Racing	Pontiac	28.281	127.294
29	40	Bobby Hamilton	SABCO Racing	Pontiac	28.289	127.258
30	77	Greg Sacks	U.S. Motorsports Inc.	Ford	28.299	127.213
31	23	Hut Stricklin	Travis Carter Enterprises	Ford	28.321	127.114
32	61	Rick Carelli	Chesrown Racing	Chevrolet	28.335	127.051
33	29	Steve Grissom (R)	Diamond Ridge Motorsports	Chevrolet	28.343	127.015
34	71	Dave Marcis	Marcis Auto Racing	Chevrolet	28.343	127.015
35	32	Dick Trickle	Active Motorsports	Chevrolet	28.377	126.863
36	8	Jeff Burton (R)	Stavola Brothers Racing	Ford	28.410	126.716
37	7	Geoff Bodine	Geoff Bodine Racing	Ford	28.419	126.676
38	76	Ron Hornaday Jr.	Spears Motorsports	Chevrolet	28.441	126.578
39	39	Rich Bickle	Roulo Brothers Racing	Chevrolet	28.460	126.493
40	06	P. J. Jones	Ultra Motorsports	Ford	28.464	126.476
Winston Cup provisionals
41	98	Jeremy Mayfield (R)	Cale Yarborough Motorsports	Ford	-*	-*
42	19	Loy Allen Jr. (R)	TriStar Motorsports	Ford	-*	-*
Winston West provisional
43	50	Mike Chase	JTC Racing	Chevrolet	-*	-*
Failed to qualify
44	51	Jeff Purvis	Phoenix Racing	Chevrolet	-*	-*
45	02	Brad Noffsinger	Taylor Racing	Ford	-*	-*
46	00	Scott Gaylord	Oliver Racing	Ford	-*	-*
47	37	Doug George	Olson Technology Racing	Ford	-*	-*
48	81	Jeff Davis	Jeff Davis Racing	Ford	-*	-*
49	90W	Joe Heath	Heath Racing	Ford	-*	-*
50	86	Rich Woodland Jr.	Woodland Racing	Chevrolet	-*	-*
51	92	John Krebs	Krebs Racing	Chevrolet	-*	-*
52	22W	St. James Davis	St. James Racing	Pontiac	-*	-*
53	95	Lance Wade	Wade Racing	Ford	-*	-*
54	58	Wayne Jacks	Jacks Motorsports	Pontiac	-*	-*
Official first round qualifying results
Official starting lineup

== Race results ==
Fin	St	#	Driver	Team	Make	Laps	Led	Status	Pts	Winnings
1	19	5	Terry Labonte	Hendrick Motorsports	Chevrolet	312	112	running	185	$67,885
2	6	6	Mark Martin	Roush Racing	Ford	312	84	running	175	$46,155
3	1	4	Sterling Marlin	Morgan–McClure Motorsports	Chevrolet	312	7	running	170	$40,330
4	14	24	Jeff Gordon	Hendrick Motorsports	Chevrolet	311	1	running	165	$26,780
5	12	16	Ted Musgrave	Roush Racing	Ford	311	0	running	155	$25,405
6	15	42	Kyle Petty	SABCO Racing	Pontiac	311	0	running	150	$24,370
7	4	10	Ricky Rudd	Rudd Performance Motorsports	Ford	311	99	running	151	$20,220
8	37	7	Geoff Bodine	Geoff Bodine Racing	Ford	311	0	running	142	$20,520
9	5	18	Dale Jarrett	Joe Gibbs Racing	Chevrolet	310	4	running	143	$21,920
10	18	17	Darrell Waltrip	Darrell Waltrip Motorsports	Chevrolet	310	0	running	134	$19,770
11	29	40	Bobby Hamilton	SABCO Racing	Pontiac	310	0	running	130	$16,820
12	13	21	Morgan Shepherd	Wood Brothers Racing	Ford	310	0	running	127	$19,020
13	9	26	Brett Bodine	King Racing	Ford	310	0	running	124	$15,920
14	10	15	Lake Speed	Bud Moore Engineering	Ford	310	0	running	121	$18,520
15	7	25	Ken Schrader	Hendrick Motorsports	Chevrolet	310	0	running	118	$15,470
16	28	22	Bobby Labonte	Bill Davis Racing	Pontiac	310	2	running	120	$14,820
17	2	2	Rusty Wallace	Penske Racing South	Ford	310	0	running	112	$20,420
18	11	28	Kenny Wallace	Robert Yates Racing	Ford	310	0	running	109	$19,195
19	34	71	Dave Marcis	Marcis Auto Racing	Chevrolet	310	0	running	106	$10,295
20	41	98	Jeremy Mayfield (R)	Cale Yarborough Motorsports	Ford	309	0	running	103	$11,560
21	27	31	Ward Burton (R)	A.G. Dillard Motorsports	Chevrolet	309	0	running	100	$7,685
22	33	29	Steve Grissom (R)	Diamond Ridge Motorsports	Chevrolet	309	0	running	97	$9,760
23	24	33	Harry Gant	Leo Jackson Motorsports	Chevrolet	308	0	running	94	$13,635
24	31	23	Hut Stricklin	Travis Carter Enterprises	Ford	308	0	running	91	$9,485
25	16	41	Joe Nemechek (R)	Larry Hedrick Motorsports	Chevrolet	306	0	running	88	$9,335
26	30	77	Greg Sacks	U.S. Motorsports Inc.	Ford	306	0	running	85	$9,235
27	36	8	Jeff Burton (R)	Stavola Brothers Racing	Ford	306	0	running	82	$13,110
28	26	90	Mike Wallace (R)	Donlavey Racing	Ford	304	0	running	79	$8,985
29	40	06	P. J. Jones	Ultra Motorsports	Ford	303	0	running	76	$6,960
30	22	12	Derrike Cope	Bobby Allison Motorsports	Ford	303	0	running	73	$12,935
31	43	50	Mike Chase	JTC Racing	Chevrolet	302	0	running	70	$6,910
32	23	75	Todd Bodine	Butch Mock Motorsports	Ford	298	0	running	67	$8,135
33	32	61	Rick Carelli	Chesrown Racing	Chevrolet	297	0	engine	64	$7,710
34	38	76	Ron Hornaday Jr.	Spears Motorsports	Chevrolet	297	1	running	66	$6,585
35	3	11	Bill Elliott	Junior Johnson & Associates	Ford	275	2	clutch	63	$11,860
36	25	30	Michael Waltrip	Bahari Racing	Pontiac	263	0	running	55	$10,535
37	39	39	Rich Bickle	Roulo Brothers Racing	Chevrolet	144	0	engine	52	$6,515
38	20	27	Jimmy Spencer	Junior Johnson & Associates	Ford	116	0	crash	49	$6,505
39	35	32	Dick Trickle	Active Motorsports	Chevrolet	97	0	engine	46	$6,490
40	8	3	Dale Earnhardt	Richard Childress Racing	Chevrolet	91	0	engine	43	$19,575
41	42	19	Loy Allen Jr. (R)	TriStar Motorsports	Ford	67	0	transmission	40	$5,825
42	21	1	Rick Mast	Precision Products Racing	Ford	31	0	engine	37	$10,325
43	17	43	John Andretti	Petty Enterprises	Pontiac	31	0	crash	34	$6,825
Official race results

== Standings after the race ==
Drivers' Championship standings

	Pos	Driver	Points
	1	Dale Earnhardt	4,519
	2	Rusty Wallace	4,140 (-379)
	3	Mark Martin	4,065 (-454)
	4	Ken Schrader	3,930 (–589)
	5	Ricky Rudd	3,929 (–590)
	6	Morgan Shepherd	3,879 (–640)
	7	Terry Labonte	3,734 (–785)
1	8	Jeff Gordon	3,658 (–861)
1	9	Darrell Waltrip	3,588 (–931)
2	10	Bill Elliott	3,568 (–951)
Official driver's standings

- Note: Only the first 10 positions are included for the driver standings.

Previous race: 1994 AC Delco 500	NASCAR Winston Cup Series; 1994 season	Next race: 1994 Hooters 500

Previous race: 1994 Spears Manufacturing 300	NASCAR Winston Transcontinental Series; 1994 season	Next race: 1994 Winter Heat #2
