= 1992 Vons 300 =

1st race of the 1992 NASCAR Winston West Series

Race details
- Race 1 of 11 in the 1992 NASCAR Winston West Series season
- Date: May 17, 1992
- Location: Mesa Marin Speedway in Bakersfield, California
- Course: Permanent racing facility
- Course length: 0.500 miles (0.805 km)
- Distance: 300 laps, 150.00 mi (241.40 km)
- Average speed: 73.973 miles per hour (119.048 km/h)

Pole position
Driver	Gary Collins	Collins Motorsports
- Time: 18.978

Most laps led
Driver	Rick Carelli	Chesrown Racing
- Laps: 187

Winner
No. 37	Rick Carelli	Chesrown Racing

The 1992 Vons 300 was the first race of the 1992 NASCAR Winston West Series season. The race was held on Sunday, May 17, 1992, at Mesa Marin Raceway, a 0.500 mile (0.805 km) oval shaped racetrack in Bakersfield, California. The race took the scheduled 300 laps to complete. The race was won by Rick Carelli, his first win of the season and first of his career. In a late race pit stop, Carelli's team changed right side tires, and came off pit road second to Bill Sedgwick, whose team changed left side tires. With fresh right side tires, Carelli was able to get the lead in the final laps en route to victory. Sedgwick finished second, thee laps ahead of third place Bill Schmitt. John Krebs and Butch Gilliland would round out the top five.

== Report ==
=== Background ===
Mesa Marin Raceway was a 0.500 mi (0.805 km) paved oval race track, located near the junction of CA 178 and CA 184 (Kern Canyon Road), east of Bakersfield, California. It opened in 1977 and was owned by Marion Collins throughout its existence. The 1992 Vons 300 was one of 45 NASCAR Winston West Series races to be held at the track during its existence.

==== Entry list ====
#	Driver	Owner	Manufacturer
00	Bryan Brown	Don Puskarich	Oldsmobile
2	Jim Courage	Gary Betchel	Pontiac
15	Rick Scribner	Rick Scribner	Chevrolet
22	St. James Davis	LaDonna Davis	Buick
24	Butch Gilliland	Butch Gilliland	Pontiac
28	Gary Collins	Marion Collins	Oldsmobile
29	John Krebs	Gary Betchel	Pontiac
37	Rick Carelli	Marshall Chesrown	Chevrolet
41	Wayne Jacks	Sara Vincent	Buick
44	Jack Sellers	Adele Emerson	Buick
50	Hershel McGriff	John Strauser	Buick
73	Bill Schmitt	Bill Schmitt	Ford
75	Bill Sedgwick	Wayne Spears	Chevrolet
78	Dan Fisher	Bill Schmitt	Ford
86	Rich Woodland Jr.	Richard Woodland	Chevrolet
90	Tim McCauley	Tim McCauley	Chevrolet
92	Ron Hornaday Jr.	Ron Hornaday Jr.	Chevrolet
99	Steve Bare	Gary Betchel	Pontiac

== Qualifying ==
With a track record of 18.978 seconds at 94.847 mph, Gary Collins would win the pole, although due to an injury he'd be replaced by Dirk Stephens for the race.

== Race results ==
Fin	St	#	Driver	Owner	Make	Laps	Led	Status	Pts
1	2	37	Rick Carelli	Marshall Chesrown	Chevrolet	300	187	Running	185
2	3	75	Bill Sedgwick	Wayne Spears	Chevrolet	300	110	Running	175
3	4	73	Bill Schmitt	Bill Schmitt	Ford	295	3	Running	170
4	6	29	John Krebs	Gary Betchel	Pontiac	294	0	Running	160
5	8	24	Butch Gilliland	Butch Gilliland	Pontiac	291	0	Running	155
6	13	00	Bryan Brown	Don Puskarich	Oldsmobile	290	0	Running	150
7	9	15	Rick Scribner	Rick Scribner	Chevrolet	282	0	Running	146
8	10	86	Rich Woodland Jr.	Richard Woodland	Chevrolet	271	0	Running	142
9	11	44	Jack Sellers	Adele Emerson	Buick	262	0	Running	138
10	1	28	Dirk Stephens	Marion Collins	Oldsmobile	257	0	Ignition	134
11	5	92	Ron Hornaday Jr.	Ron Hornaday Jr.	Chevrolet	257	0	Running	130
12	17	90	Tim McCauley	Tim McCauley	Chevrolet	197	0	Running	127
13	16	22	St. James Davis	LaDonna Davis	Buick	184	0	Oil Pump	124
14	15	99	Steve Bare	Gary Betchel	Pontiac	86	0	Suspension	121
15	7	50	Hershel McGriff	John Strauser	Chevrolet	78	0	Timing Chain	118
16	12	41	Wayne Jacks	Sara Vincent	Buick	4	0	Oil Pressure	115
17	14	2	Jim Courage	Gary Betchel	Pontiac	3	0	Camshaft	112
18	18	78	Dan Fisher	Bill Schmitt	Ford	3	0	Ignition	109

== Standings after the race ==
Pos	Driver	Points
1	Rick Carelli	185
2	Bill Sedgwick	175 (-10)
3	Bill Schmitt	170 (-15)
4	John Krebs	160 (-25)
5	Butch Gilliland	155 (-30)
6	Bryan Brown	150 (-35)
7	Rick Scribner	146 (-39)
8	Rich Woodland Jr.	142 (-43)
9	Jack Sellers	138 (-47)
10	Dirk Stephens	134 (-51)

- Note: Only the first 10 positions are included for the driver standings.

Previous race: 1991 Pyroil 500	NASCAR Winston West Series; 1992 season	Next race: 1992 Alpha Beta 200
