= 1991 Pyroil 500 =

28th race of the 1991 NASCAR Winston Cup Series

Race details
- Race 28 of 29 in the 1991 NASCAR Winston Cup Series
- The 1991 Pyroil 500 program cover.
- Date: November 3, 1991
- Official name: 4th Annual Pyroil 500
- Location: Avondale, Arizona, Phoenix International Raceway
- Course: Permanent racing facility
- Course length: 1 miles (1.6 km)
- Distance: 312 laps, 312 mi (502.115 km)
- Scheduled distance: 312 laps, 312 mi (502.115 km)
- Average speed: 95.746 miles per hour (154.088 km/h)

Pole position
Driver	Geoff Bodine	Junior Johnson & Associates
- Time: 28.220

Most laps led
Driver	Davey Allison	Robert Yates Racing
- Laps: 162

Winner
No. 28	Davey Allison	Robert Yates Racing

Television in the United States
- Network: TNN
- Announcers: Mike Joy, Buddy Baker, Neil Bonnett

Radio in the United States
- Radio: Motor Racing Network

The 1991 Pyroil 500 was the 28th and penultimate stock car race of the 1991 NASCAR Winston Cup Series season, the ninth and the final race of the 1991 NASCAR Winston West Series season, and the fourth iteration of the event. The race was held on Sunday, November 3, 1991, in Avondale, Arizona at Phoenix International Raceway, a 1-mile (1.6 km) permanent low-banked tri-oval race track. The race took the scheduled 312 laps to complete. At race's end, Robert Yates Racing driver Davey Allison would manage to dominate the late stages of the race, leading 162 of the final 166 laps of the race to take his 13th career NASCAR Winston Cup Series victory and his fifth and final victory of the season. To fill out the top three, owner-driver Darrell Waltrip and Junior Johnson & Associates driver Sterling Marlin would finish second and third, respectively.

In the driver's championship for the 1991 NASCAR Winston Cup Series, Richard Childress Racing driver Dale Earnhardt was considered the extremely heavy favorite to win the championship, only needing to start the next race, the 1991 Hardee's 500, to win the championship.

== Background ==
The layout of Phoenix International Raceway, the venue where the race was held.

Phoenix International Raceway – also known as PIR – is a one-mile, low-banked tri-oval race track located in Avondale, Arizona. It is named after the nearby metropolitan area of Phoenix. The motorsport track opened in 1964 and currently hosts two NASCAR race weekends annually. PIR has also hosted the IndyCar Series, CART, USAC and the Rolex Sports Car Series. The raceway is currently owned and operated by International Speedway Corporation.

The raceway was originally constructed with a 2.5 mi (4.0 km) road course that ran both inside and outside of the main tri-oval. In 1991 the track was reconfigured with the current 1.51 mi (2.43 km) interior layout. PIR has an estimated grandstand seating capacity of around 67,000. Lights were installed around the track in 2004 following the addition of a second annual NASCAR race weekend.

=== Entry list ===
- (R) denotes rookie driver.

#	Driver	Team	Make
00	Scott Gaylord	Oliver Racing	Oldsmobile
1	Rick Mast	Precision Products Racing	Oldsmobile
2	Rusty Wallace	Penske Racing South	Pontiac
3	Dale Earnhardt	Richard Childress Racing	Chevrolet
4	Ernie Irvan	Morgan–McClure Motorsports	Chevrolet
04	Hershel McGriff	Lipseia Racing	Pontiac
5	Ricky Rudd	Hendrick Motorsports	Chevrolet
6	Mark Martin	Roush Racing	Ford
7	Alan Kulwicki	AK Racing	Ford
8	Rick Wilson	Stavola Brothers Racing	Buick
9	Bill Elliott	Melling Racing	Ford
09	R. K. Smith	Midgley Racing	Pontiac
10	Derrike Cope	Whitcomb Racing	Chevrolet
11	Geoff Bodine	Junior Johnson & Associates	Ford
12	Hut Stricklin	Bobby Allison Motorsports	Buick
14	Mike Chase	A. J. Foyt Racing	Chevrolet
15	Morgan Shepherd	Bud Moore Engineering	Ford
15W	Rick Scribner	Scribner Racing	Chevrolet
17	Darrell Waltrip	Darrell Waltrip Motorsports	Chevrolet
19	Chad Little	Little Racing	Ford
21	Dale Jarrett	Wood Brothers Racing	Ford
22	Sterling Marlin	Junior Johnson & Associates	Ford
22W	St. James Davis	St. James Racing	Buick
23	Butch Gilliland	Gilliland Racing	Pontiac
24	Kenny Wallace	Team III Racing	Pontiac
25	Ken Schrader	Hendrick Motorsports	Chevrolet
26	Brett Bodine	King Racing	Buick
28	Davey Allison	Robert Yates Racing	Ford
29	Gary Collins	Collins Motorsports	Oldsmobile
30	Michael Waltrip	Bahari Racing	Pontiac
33	Harry Gant	Leo Jackson Motorsports	Oldsmobile
37	Rick Carelli	Chesrown Racing	Chevrolet
41	Larry Pearson	Larry Hedrick Motorsports	Chevrolet
42	Kyle Petty	SABCO Racing	Pontiac
43	Richard Petty	Petty Enterprises	Pontiac
44	Irv Hoerr	Labonte Motorsports	Oldsmobile
44W	Jack Sellers	Emerson Racing	Buick
49	Stanley Smith (R)	BS&S Motorsports	Buick
51	Jeff Purvis (R)	Phoenix Racing	Chevrolet
52	Mike Wallace	Jimmy Means Racing	Pontiac
55	Ted Musgrave (R)	U.S. Racing	Pontiac
58	Wayne Jacks	Jacks Motorsports	Oldsmobile
66	Randy LaJoie	Cale Yarborough Motorsports	Pontiac
68	Bobby Hamilton (R)	TriStar Motorsports	Oldsmobile
71	Dave Marcis	Marcis Auto Racing	Chevrolet
72	Mark Reed	Reed Racing	Chevrolet
73	Bill Schmitt	Schmitt Racing	Ford
75	Joe Ruttman	RahMoc Enterprises	Oldsmobile
76	Bill Sedgwick	Spears Motorsports	Chevrolet
86	Ron Hornaday Jr.	Benison Racing	Chevrolet
89	Jim Sauter	Mueller Brothers Racing	Pontiac
91	Robert Sprague	Rouse Racing	Ford
93	Troy Beebe	Beebe Racing	Buick
94	Terry Labonte	Hagan Racing	Oldsmobile
97	Billy Jac Shaw	Beebe Racing	Buick
98	Jimmy Spencer	Travis Carter Enterprises	Chevrolet
99	John Krebs	KC Racing	Pontiac

== Qualifying ==
Qualifying was split into two rounds. The first round was held on Friday, November 1, at 5:30 PM EST. Each driver would have one lap to set a time. During the first round, the top 20 drivers in the round would be guaranteed a starting spot in the race. If a driver was not able to guarantee a spot in the first round, they had the option to scrub their time from the first round and try and run a faster lap time in a second round qualifying run, held on Saturday, November 2, at 2:00 PM EST. As with the first round, each driver would have one lap to set a time. For this specific race, positions 21-40 would be decided on time, and depending on who needed it, a select amount of positions were given to cars who had not otherwise qualified but were high enough in owner's points; which was one for cars in the NASCAR Winston Cup Series and two extra provisionals for the NASCAR Winston West Series. If needed, a past champion who did not qualify on either time or provisionals could use a champion's provisional, adding one more spot to the field.

Geoff Bodine, driving for Junior Johnson & Associates, won the pole, setting a time of 28.220 and an average speed of 127.569 mph (205.302 km/h) in the first round.

14 drivers would fail to qualify.

=== Full qualifying results ===
Pos.	#	Driver	Team	Make	Time	Speed
1	11	Geoff Bodine	Junior Johnson & Associates	Ford	28.220	127.569
2	9	Bill Elliott	Melling Racing	Ford	28.227	127.537
3	6	Mark Martin	Roush Racing	Ford	28.255	127.411
4	33	Harry Gant	Leo Jackson Motorsports	Oldsmobile	28.269	127.348
5	7	Alan Kulwicki	AK Racing	Ford	28.273	127.330
6	10	Derrike Cope	Whitcomb Racing	Chevrolet	28.294	127.235
7	25	Ken Schrader	Hendrick Motorsports	Chevrolet	28.328	127.083
8	26	Brett Bodine	King Racing	Buick	28.338	127.038
9	22	Sterling Marlin	Junior Johnson & Associates	Ford	28.394	126.787
10	2	Rusty Wallace	Penske Racing South	Pontiac	28.429	126.631
11	17	Darrell Waltrip	Darrell Waltrip Motorsports	Chevrolet	28.442	126.573
12	3	Dale Earnhardt	Richard Childress Racing	Chevrolet	28.460	126.493
13	28	Davey Allison	Robert Yates Racing	Ford	28.514	126.254
14	5	Ricky Rudd	Hendrick Motorsports	Chevrolet	28.535	126.161
15	4	Ernie Irvan	Morgan–McClure Motorsports	Chevrolet	28.548	126.103
16	12	Hut Stricklin	Bobby Allison Motorsports	Buick	28.583	125.949
17	21	Dale Jarrett	Wood Brothers Racing	Ford	28.632	125.733
18	42	Kyle Petty	SABCO Racing	Pontiac	28.713	125.379
19	15	Morgan Shepherd	Bud Moore Engineering	Ford	28.722	125.339
20	43	Richard Petty	Petty Enterprises	Pontiac	28.730	125.305
Failed to lock in Round 1
21	55	Ted Musgrave (R)	U.S. Racing	Pontiac	28.733	125.291
22	8	Rick Wilson	Stavola Brothers Racing	Buick	28.754	125.200
23	71	Dave Marcis	Marcis Auto Racing	Chevrolet	28.759	125.178
24	76	Bill Sedgwick	Spears Motorsports	Chevrolet	28.770	125.130
25	1	Rick Mast	Precision Products Racing	Oldsmobile	28.792	125.035
26	98	Jimmy Spencer	Travis Carter Enterprises	Chevrolet	28.801	124.996
27	75	Joe Ruttman	RahMoc Enterprises	Oldsmobile	28.802	124.991
28	19	Chad Little	Little Racing	Ford	28.803	124.987
29	66	Randy LaJoie	Cale Yarborough Motorsports	Pontiac	28.817	124.926
30	30	Michael Waltrip	Bahari Racing	Pontiac	28.877	124.667
31	41	Larry Pearson	Larry Hedrick Motorsports	Chevrolet	28.877	124.667
32	14	Mike Chase	A. J. Foyt Racing	Chevrolet	28.891	124.606
33	49	Stanley Smith (R)	BS&S Motorsports	Buick	28.916	124.499
34	51	Jeff Purvis (R)	Phoenix Racing	Chevrolet	28.922	124.473
35	94	Terry Labonte	Hagan Racing	Oldsmobile	28.951	124.348
36	72	Mark Reed	Reed Racing	Chevrolet	28.963	124.297
37	29	Gary Collins	Collins Motorsports	Oldsmobile	28.982	124.215
38	52	Mike Wallace	Jimmy Means Racing	Pontiac	29.043	123.954
39	73	Bill Schmitt	Schmitt Racing	Ford	29.099	123.716
40	68	Bobby Hamilton (R)	TriStar Motorsports	Oldsmobile	29.122	123.618
Winston Cup provisional
41	24	Kenny Wallace	Team III Racing	Pontiac	-*	-*
Winston West provisionals
42	23	Butch Gilliland	Gilliland Racing	Pontiac	-*	-*
43	04	Hershel McGriff	Lipseia Racing	Pontiac	-*	-*
Failed to qualify
44	22W	St. James Davis	St. James Racing	Buick	-*	-*
45	89	Jim Sauter	Mueller Brothers Racing	Pontiac	-*	-*
46	99	John Krebs	KC Racing	Pontiac	-*	-*
47	37	Rick Carelli	Chesrown Racing	Chevrolet	-*	-*
48	58	Wayne Jacks	Jacks Motorsports	Oldsmobile	-*	-*
49	86	Ron Hornaday Jr.	Benison Racing	Chevrolet	-*	-*
50	44W	Jack Sellers	Emerson Racing	Buick	-*	-*
51	15W	Rick Scribner	Scribner Racing	Chevrolet	-*	-*
52	00	Scott Gaylord	Oliver Racing	Oldsmobile	-*	-*
53	97	Billy Jac Shaw	Beebe Racing	Buick	-*	-*
54	91	Robert Sprague	Rouse Racing	Ford	-*	-*
55	93	Troy Beebe	Beebe Racing	Buick	-*	-*
56	44	Irv Hoerr	Labonte Motorsports	Oldsmobile	-*	-*
57	09	R. K. Smith	Midgley Racing	Pontiac	-*	-*
Official first round qualifying results
Official starting lineup

== Race results ==
Fin	St	#	Driver	Team	Make	Laps	Led	Status	Pts	Winnings
1	13	28	Davey Allison	Robert Yates Racing	Ford	312	162	running	185	$78,500
2	11	17	Darrell Waltrip	Darrell Waltrip Motorsports	Chevrolet	312	25	running	175	$37,225
3	9	22	Sterling Marlin	Junior Johnson & Associates	Ford	312	0	running	170	$25,000
4	5	7	Alan Kulwicki	AK Racing	Ford	312	1	running	165	$22,600
5	10	2	Rusty Wallace	Penske Racing South	Pontiac	312	0	running	155	$16,475
6	15	4	Ernie Irvan	Morgan–McClure Motorsports	Chevrolet	312	2	running	155	$18,100
7	26	98	Jimmy Spencer	Travis Carter Enterprises	Chevrolet	311	4	running	151	$12,850
8	1	11	Geoff Bodine	Junior Johnson & Associates	Ford	311	53	running	147	$19,050
9	12	3	Dale Earnhardt	Richard Childress Racing	Chevrolet	311	0	running	138	$18,200
10	19	15	Morgan Shepherd	Bud Moore Engineering	Ford	311	0	running	134	$16,750
11	14	5	Ricky Rudd	Hendrick Motorsports	Chevrolet	311	0	running	130	$13,250
12	35	94	Terry Labonte	Hagan Racing	Oldsmobile	311	0	running	127	$9,750
13	40	68	Bobby Hamilton (R)	TriStar Motorsports	Oldsmobile	311	1	running	129	$8,100
14	8	26	Brett Bodine	King Racing	Buick	311	1	running	126	$9,050
15	22	8	Rick Wilson	Stavola Brothers Racing	Buick	311	10	running	118	$9,000
16	6	10	Derrike Cope	Whitcomb Racing	Chevrolet	311	0	running	115	$12,950
17	7	25	Ken Schrader	Hendrick Motorsports	Chevrolet	310	0	running	112	$7,750
18	21	55	Ted Musgrave (R)	U.S. Racing	Pontiac	310	0	running	109	$5,700
19	3	6	Mark Martin	Roush Racing	Ford	310	20	running	111	$13,550
20	18	42	Kyle Petty	SABCO Racing	Pontiac	309	2	running	108	$12,225
21	24	76	Bill Sedgwick	Spears Motorsports	Chevrolet	308	0	running	100	$5,050
22	27	75	Joe Ruttman	RahMoc Enterprises	Oldsmobile	308	0	running	97	$6,925
23	4	33	Harry Gant	Leo Jackson Motorsports	Oldsmobile	307	0	running	94	$7,050
24	30	30	Michael Waltrip	Bahari Racing	Pontiac	307	0	running	91	$6,725
25	2	9	Bill Elliott	Melling Racing	Ford	307	0	running	88	$12,450
26	32	14	Mike Chase	A. J. Foyt Racing	Chevrolet	305	0	running	85	$3,825
27	43	04	Hershel McGriff	Lipseia Racing	Pontiac	300	0	running	82	$3,800
28	25	1	Rick Mast	Precision Products Racing	Oldsmobile	299	0	running	79	$6,525
29	42	23	Butch Gilliland	Gilliland Racing	Pontiac	299	0	running	76	$3,750
30	28	19	Chad Little	Little Racing	Ford	298	0	running	73	$4,925
31	38	52	Mike Wallace	Jimmy Means Racing	Pontiac	246	0	running	70	$3,700
32	29	66	Randy LaJoie	Cale Yarborough Motorsports	Pontiac	203	0	engine	67	$6,100
33	31	41	Larry Pearson	Larry Hedrick Motorsports	Chevrolet	178	0	accident	64	$3,400
34	36	72	Mark Reed	Reed Racing	Chevrolet	177	0	valve	61	$3,375
35	17	21	Dale Jarrett	Wood Brothers Racing	Ford	151	19	engine	63	$6,000
36	33	49	Stanley Smith (R)	BS&S Motorsports	Buick	150	12	accident	60	$3,325
37	39	73	Bill Schmitt	Schmitt Racing	Ford	136	0	accident	52	$3,305
38	34	51	Jeff Purvis (R)	Phoenix Racing	Chevrolet	127	0	engine	49	$3,295
39	16	12	Hut Stricklin	Bobby Allison Motorsports	Buick	105	0	accident	46	$5,910
40	23	71	Dave Marcis	Marcis Auto Racing	Chevrolet	91	0	a-frame	43	$5,850
41	20	43	Richard Petty	Petty Enterprises	Pontiac	89	0	accident	40	$3,250
42	37	29	Gary Collins	Collins Motorsports	Oldsmobile	61	0	accident	37	$3,250
43	41	24	Kenny Wallace	Team III Racing	Pontiac	1	0	steering	34	$3,000
Official race results

== Standings after the race ==
Drivers' Championship standings

	Pos	Driver	Points
	1	Dale Earnhardt	4,127
1	2	Davey Allison	3,971 (-156)
1	3	Ricky Rudd	3,962 (-165)
	4	Harry Gant	3,820 (–307)
1	5	Ernie Irvan	3,750 (–377)
1	6	Mark Martin	3,729 (–398)
1	7	Sterling Marlin	3,693 (–434)
1	8	Ken Schrader	3,638 (–489)
	9	Darrell Waltrip	3,572 (–555)
	10	Rusty Wallace	3,521 (–606)
Official driver's standings

- Note: Only the first 10 positions are included for the driver standings.

Previous race: 1991 AC Delco 500	NASCAR Winston Cup Series; 1991 season	Next race: 1991 Hardee's 500

Previous race: 1991 Winston 400	NASCAR Winston West Series; 1991 season	Next race: 1992 Vons 300
