= 1994 Save Mart Supermarkets 300 =

Tenth race of the 1994 NASCAR Winston Cup Series

Race details
- Race 10 of 31 in the 1994 NASCAR Winston Cup Series
- The 1994 Save Mart Supermarkets 300 program cover.
- Date: May 15, 1994
- Official name: 6th Annual Save Mart Supermarkets 300
- Location: Sonoma, California, Sears Point Raceway
- Course: Permanent racing facility
- Course length: 2.52 miles (4.06 km)
- Distance: 74 laps, 186.48 mi (300.11 km)
- Scheduled distance: 74 laps, 186.48 mi (300.11 km)
- Average speed: 77.458 miles per hour (124.657 km/h)
- Attendance: 94,157

Pole position
Driver	Ernie Irvan	Robert Yates Racing
- Time: 1:39.132

Most laps led
Driver	Ernie Irvan	Robert Yates Racing
- Laps: 68

Winner
No. 28	Ernie Irvan	Robert Yates Racing

Television in the United States
- Network: ESPN
- Announcers: Bob Jenkins, Ned Jarrett, Benny Parsons

Radio in the United States
- Radio: Motor Racing Network

The 1994 Save Mart Supermarkets 300 was the 10th stock car race of the 1994 NASCAR Winston Cup Series season, the third race of the 1994 NASCAR Winston Transcontinental Series, and the sixth iteration of the event. The race was held on Sunday, May 15, 1994, at the Grand Prix layout of Sears Point Raceway, a 2.52 miles (4.06 km) permanent road course layout. The race took the scheduled 74 laps to complete. At race's end, Robert Yates Racing driver Ernie Irvan would manage to dominate the race to take his 12th career NASCAR Winston Cup Series victory and his third and final victory of the season. To fill out the top three, Geoff Bodine, driving for his own Geoff Bodine Racing, and Richard Childress Racing driver Dale Earnhardt would finish second and third, respectively.

== Background ==
The layout of Sears Point Raceway used by NASCAR at the time.

Sears Point Raceway is one of two road courses to hold NASCAR races, the other being Watkins Glen International. The standard road course at Sears Point Raceway is a 12-turn course that is 2.52 miles (4.06 km) long; the track was modified in 1998, adding the Chute, which bypassed turns 5 and 6, shortening the course to 1.95 miles (3.14 km). The Chute was only used for NASCAR events such as this race, and was criticized by many drivers, who preferred the full layout. In 2001, it was replaced with a 70-degree turn, 4A, bringing the track to its current dimensions of 1.99 miles (3.20 km).

=== Entry list ===
- (R) denotes rookie driver.

#	Driver	Team	Make
1	Rick Mast	Precision Products Racing	Ford
2	Rusty Wallace	Penske Racing South	Ford
3	Dale Earnhardt	Richard Childress Racing	Chevrolet
4	Sterling Marlin	Morgan–McClure Motorsports	Chevrolet
5	Terry Labonte	Hendrick Motorsports	Chevrolet
6	Mark Martin	Roush Racing	Ford
7	Geoff Bodine	Geoff Bodine Racing	Ford
8	Jeff Burton (R)	Stavola Brothers Racing	Ford
9	John Krebs	Diamond Ridge Motorsports	Chevrolet
09	Charlie O'Brien	O'Brien Racing	Pontiac
10	Ricky Rudd	Rudd Performance Motorsports	Ford
11	Bill Elliott	Junior Johnson & Associates	Ford
12	Chuck Bown	Bobby Allison Motorsports	Ford
14	John Andretti (R)	Hagan Racing	Chevrolet
15	Lake Speed	Bud Moore Engineering	Ford
16	Ted Musgrave	Roush Racing	Ford
17	Darrell Waltrip	Darrell Waltrip Motorsports	Chevrolet
18	Dale Jarrett	Joe Gibbs Racing	Chevrolet
19	Loy Allen Jr. (R)	TriStar Motorsports	Ford
20	Gary Collins	Venable Racing	Ford
21	Morgan Shepherd	Wood Brothers Racing	Ford
22	Bobby Labonte	Bill Davis Racing	Pontiac
23	Hut Stricklin	Travis Carter Enterprises	Ford
24	Jeff Gordon	Hendrick Motorsports	Chevrolet
25	Ken Schrader	Hendrick Motorsports	Chevrolet
26	Brett Bodine	King Racing	Ford
27	Jimmy Spencer	Junior Johnson & Associates	Ford
28	Ernie Irvan	Robert Yates Racing	Ford
29	Steve Grissom	Diamond Ridge Motorsports	Chevrolet
30	Michael Waltrip	Bahari Racing	Pontiac
31	Ward Burton	A.G. Dillard Motorsports	Chevrolet
32	Dick Trickle	Active Motorsports	Chevrolet
33	Harry Gant	Leo Jackson Motorsports	Chevrolet
36	Butch Gilliland	Gilliland Racing	Chevrolet
37	Doug George	Olson Technology Racing	Ford
38	Tobey Butler	Bill Stroppe Motorsports	Ford
40	Bobby Hamilton	SABCO Racing	Pontiac
41	Joe Nemechek (R)	Larry Hedrick Motorsports	Chevrolet
42	Kyle Petty	SABCO Racing	Pontiac
43	Wally Dallenbach Jr.	Petty Enterprises	Pontiac
48	Jack Sellers	Sellers Racing	Chevrolet
50	Mike Chase	JTC Racing	Chevrolet
52	Scott Gaylord	Jimmy Means Racing	Ford
55	Jimmy Hensley	RaDiUs Motorsports	Ford
58	Wayne Jacks	Jacks Motorsports	Pontiac
61	Rick Carelli	Chesrown Racing	Chevrolet
71	Dave Marcis	Marcis Auto Racing	Chevrolet
75	Todd Bodine	Butch Mock Motorsports	Ford
76	Ron Hornaday Jr.	Spears Motorsports	Chevrolet
77	Greg Sacks	U.S. Motorsports Inc.	Ford
81	Jeff Davis	Jeff Davis Racing	Ford
86	Rich Woodland Jr.	Gilliland Racing	Oldsmobile
90	Mike Wallace (R)	Donlavey Racing	Ford
90W	Joe Heath	Heath Racing	Ford
98	Derrike Cope	Cale Yarborough Motorsports	Ford

== Qualifying ==
Qualifying was split into two rounds. The first round was held on Friday, April 22, at 6:30 PM EST. Each driver would have one lap to set a time. During the first round, the top 25 drivers in the round would be guaranteed a starting spot in the race. If a driver was not able to guarantee a spot in the first round, they had the option to scrub their time from the first round and try and run a faster lap time in a second round qualifying run, held on Saturday, April 23, at 1:00 PM EST. As with the first round, each driver would have one lap to set a time. For this specific race, positions 26-40 would be decided on time, and depending on who needed it, a select amount of positions were given to cars who had not otherwise qualified but were high enough in owner's points; which was two for cars in the NASCAR Winston Cup Series and one extra provisional for the NASCAR Winston West Series. If needed, a past champion who did not qualify on either time or provisionals could use a champion's provisional, adding one more spot to the field.

Ernie Irvan, driving for Robert Yates Racing, would win the pole, setting a time of 1:39.132 and an average speed of 91.514 miles per hour (147.278 km/h) in the first round.

12 drivers would fail to qualify.

=== Full qualifying results ===
Pos.	#	Driver	Team	Make	Time	Speed
1	28	Ernie Irvan	Robert Yates Racing	Ford	1:39.132	91.514
2	6	Mark Martin	Roush Racing	Ford	1:39.284	91.374
3	10	Ricky Rudd	Rudd Performance Motorsports	Ford	1:39.470	91.203
4	3	Dale Earnhardt	Richard Childress Racing	Chevrolet	1:39.872	90.836
5	5	Terry Labonte	Hendrick Motorsports	Chevrolet	1:39.905	90.806
6	24	Jeff Gordon	Hendrick Motorsports	Chevrolet	1:39.929	90.784
7	43	Wally Dallenbach Jr.	Petty Enterprises	Pontiac	1:40.045	90.679
8	25	Ken Schrader	Hendrick Motorsports	Chevrolet	1:40.478	90.288
9	30	Michael Waltrip	Bahari Racing	Pontiac	1:40.559	90.216
10	42	Kyle Petty	SABCO Racing	Pontiac	1:40.587	90.191
11	11	Bill Elliott	Junior Johnson & Associates	Ford	1:40.639	90.144
12	2	Rusty Wallace	Penske Racing South	Ford	1:40.664	90.122
13	4	Sterling Marlin	Morgan–McClure Motorsports	Chevrolet	1:40.864	89.943
14	36	Butch Gilliland	Gilliland Racing	Chevrolet	1:40.923	89.890
15	16	Ted Musgrave	Roush Racing	Ford	1:41.020	89.804
16	33	Harry Gant	Leo Jackson Motorsports	Chevrolet	1:41.166	89.674
17	98	Derrike Cope	Cale Yarborough Motorsports	Ford	1:41.236	89.612
18	76	Ron Hornaday Jr.	Spears Motorsports	Chevrolet	1:41.293	89.562
19	21	Morgan Shepherd	Wood Brothers Racing	Ford	1:41.303	89.553
20	18	Dale Jarrett	Joe Gibbs Racing	Chevrolet	1:41.353	89.509
21	8	Jeff Burton (R)	Stavola Brothers Racing	Ford	1:41.395	89.472
22	22	Bobby Labonte	Bill Davis Racing	Pontiac	1:41.479	89.398
23	26	Brett Bodine	King Racing	Ford	1:41.767	89.145
24	1	Rick Mast	Precision Products Racing	Ford	1:41.809	89.108
25	27	Jimmy Spencer	Junior Johnson & Associates	Ford	1:41.841	89.080
Failed to lock in Round 1
26	7	Geoff Bodine	Geoff Bodine Racing	Ford	1:39.642	91.046
27	31	Ward Burton (R)	A.G. Dillard Motorsports	Chevrolet	1:40.898	89.913
28	90	Mike Wallace (R)	Donlavey Racing	Ford	1:41.252	89.598
29	15	Lake Speed	Bud Moore Engineering	Ford	1:41.649	89.248
30	40	Bobby Hamilton	SABCO Racing	Pontiac	1:41.873	89.052
31	75	Todd Bodine	Butch Mock Motorsports	Ford	1:42.123	88.834
32	41	Joe Nemechek (R)	Larry Hedrick Motorsports	Chevrolet	1:42.128	88.830
33	17	Darrell Waltrip	Darrell Waltrip Motorsports	Chevrolet	1:42.130	88.828
34	9	John Krebs	Diamond Ridge Motorsports	Chevrolet	1:42.156	88.805
35	50	Mike Chase	JTC Racing	Chevrolet	1:42.396	88.597
36	61	Rick Carelli	Chesrown Racing	Chevrolet	1:42.480	88.525
37	23	Hut Stricklin	Travis Carter Enterprises	Ford	1:42.541	88.472
38	14	John Andretti (R)	Hagan Racing	Chevrolet	1:42.660	88.369
39	71	Dave Marcis	Marcis Auto Racing	Chevrolet	1:42.753	88.289
40	29	Steve Grissom (R)	Diamond Ridge Motorsports	Chevrolet	1:42.767	88.277
Winston Cup provisionals
41	12	Chuck Bown	Bobby Allison Motorsports	Ford	-*	-*
42	77	Greg Sacks	U.S. Motorsports, Inc.	Ford	-*	-*
Winston West provisional
43	20	Gary Collins	Venable Racing	Ford	-*	-*
Failed to qualify
44	52	Scott Gaylord	Jimmy Means Racing	Ford	1:42.808	88.242
45	32	Dick Trickle	Active Motorsports	Chevrolet	1:42.831	88.222
46	81	Jeff Davis	Jeff Davis Racing	Ford	1:42.961	88.111
47	37	Doug George	Olson Technology Racing	Ford	1:42.972	88.102
48	55	Jimmy Hensley	RaDiUs Motorsports	Ford	1:43.318	87.807
49	09	Charlie O'Brien	O'Brien Racing	Pontiac	1:43.545	87.614
50	90W	Joe Heath	Heath Racing	Ford	1:45.365	86.101
51	19	Loy Allen Jr. (R)	TriStar Motorsports	Ford	1:45.412	86.062
52	38	Tobey Butler	Bill Stroppe Motorsports	Ford	1:46.791	84.951
53	48	Jack Sellers	Sellers Racing	Chevrolet	1:51.202	81.581
54	58	Wayne Jacks	Jacks Motorsports	Pontiac	-	-
55	86	Rich Woodland Jr.	Gilliland Racing	Oldsmobile	-	-
Official first round qualifying results
Official starting lineup

== Race results ==
Fin	St	#	Driver	Team	Make	Laps	Led	Status	Pts	Winnings
1	1	28	Ernie Irvan	Robert Yates Racing	Ford	74	68	running	185	$78,810
2	26	7	Geoff Bodine	Geoff Bodine Racing	Ford	74	0	running	170	$45,640
3	4	3	Dale Earnhardt	Richard Childress Racing	Chevrolet	74	3	running	170	$37,825
4	7	43	Wally Dallenbach Jr.	Petty Enterprises	Pontiac	74	0	running	160	$24,920
5	12	2	Rusty Wallace	Penske Racing South	Ford	74	0	running	155	$25,970
6	15	16	Ted Musgrave	Roush Racing	Ford	74	0	running	150	$20,370
7	19	21	Morgan Shepherd	Wood Brothers Racing	Ford	74	1	running	151	$22,020
8	2	6	Mark Martin	Roush Racing	Ford	74	0	running	142	$24,120
9	8	25	Ken Schrader	Hendrick Motorsports	Chevrolet	74	0	running	138	$18,170
10	16	33	Harry Gant	Leo Jackson Motorsports	Chevrolet	74	0	running	134	$19,815
11	10	42	Kyle Petty	SABCO Racing	Pontiac	74	0	running	130	$16,755
12	20	18	Dale Jarrett	Joe Gibbs Racing	Chevrolet	74	0	running	127	$20,755
13	23	26	Brett Bodine	King Racing	Ford	74	0	running	124	$16,355
14	3	10	Ricky Rudd	Rudd Performance Motorsports	Ford	74	0	running	121	$9,155
15	21	8	Jeff Burton (R)	Stavola Brothers Racing	Ford	74	0	running	118	$16,705
16	9	30	Michael Waltrip	Bahari Racing	Pontiac	74	0	running	115	$15,005
17	22	22	Bobby Labonte	Bill Davis Racing	Pontiac	74	0	running	112	$14,730
18	33	17	Darrell Waltrip	Darrell Waltrip Motorsports	Chevrolet	74	0	running	109	$14,580
19	38	14	John Andretti (R)	Hagan Racing	Chevrolet	74	0	running	106	$14,955
20	37	23	Hut Stricklin	Travis Carter Enterprises	Ford	74	0	running	103	$8,480
21	41	12	Chuck Bown	Bobby Allison Motorsports	Ford	73	0	running	100	$14,230
22	32	41	Joe Nemechek (R)	Larry Hedrick Motorsports	Chevrolet	73	0	running	97	$10,105
23	28	90	Mike Wallace (R)	Donlavey Racing	Ford	73	0	running	94	$9,980
24	42	77	Greg Sacks	U.S. Motorsports, Inc.	Ford	73	1	running	96	$7,610
25	39	71	Dave Marcis	Marcis Auto Racing	Chevrolet	73	0	running	88	$9,900
26	25	27	Jimmy Spencer	Junior Johnson & Associates	Ford	73	0	running	85	$9,780
27	14	36	Butch Gilliland	Gilliland Racing	Chevrolet	72	0	running	82	$7,755
28	5	5	Terry Labonte	Hendrick Motorsports	Chevrolet	72	0	running	79	$17,680
29	13	4	Sterling Marlin	Morgan–McClure Motorsports	Chevrolet	72	0	running	76	$17,470
30	11	11	Bill Elliott	Junior Johnson & Associates	Ford	71	0	running	73	$13,540
31	35	50	Mike Chase	JTC Racing	Chevrolet	70	0	running	70	$7,355
32	29	15	Lake Speed	Bud Moore Engineering	Ford	70	0	running	67	$17,305
33	30	40	Bobby Hamilton	SABCO Racing	Pontiac	68	0	transmission	64	$13,255
34	24	1	Rick Mast	Precision Products Racing	Ford	62	0	transmission	61	$13,230
35	40	29	Steve Grissom (R)	Diamond Ridge Motorsports	Chevrolet	61	0	rear end	58	$7,205
36	27	31	Ward Burton (R)	A.G. Dillard Motorsports	Chevrolet	60	0	running	55	$7,195
37	6	24	Jeff Gordon	Hendrick Motorsports	Chevrolet	59	0	rearend	52	$12,675
38	31	75	Todd Bodine	Butch Mock Motorsports	Ford	56	0	running	49	$7,155
39	18	76	Ron Hornaday Jr.	Spears Motorsports	Chevrolet	53	0	running	46	$7,125
40	43	20	Gary Collins	Venable Racing	Ford	43	0	running	43	$7,100
41	36	61	Rick Carelli	Chesrown Racing	Chevrolet	24	0	engine	40	$7,100
42	34	9	John Krebs	Diamond Ridge Motorsports	Chevrolet	18	1	accident	42	$8,100
43	17	98	Derrike Cope	Cale Yarborough Motorsports	Ford	18	0	accident	34	$8,600
Official race results

== Standings after the race ==
Drivers' Championship standings

	Pos	Driver	Points
	1	Ernie Irvan	1,639
	2	Dale Earnhardt	1,599 (-40)
	3	Mark Martin	1,369 (-270)
	4	Ken Schrader	1,349 (–290)
1	5	Morgan Shepherd	1,295 (–344)
1	6	Rusty Wallace	1,290 (–349)
2	7	Lake Speed	1,225 (–414)
1	8	Ricky Rudd	1,215 (–424)
1	9	Kyle Petty	1,204 (–435)
1	10	Ted Musgrave	1,186 (–453)
Official driver's standings

- Note: Only the first 10 positions are included for the driver standings.

Previous race: 1994 Winston Select 500	NASCAR Winston Cup Series; 1994 season	Next race: 1994 Coca-Cola 600

Previous race: 1994 Valvoline/Pit Lube 200	NASCAR Winston Transcontinental Series; 1994 season	Next race: 1994 Valencia Dodge 200
