= Rick Carelli =

American racing driver and crew chief (born 1954)

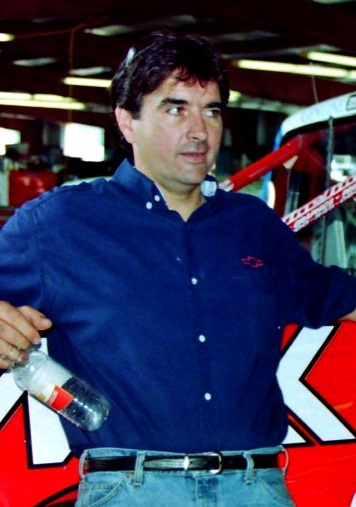
- Carelli in 1997
- Born: Richard Dean Carelli; November 9, 1954 (age 72); Arvada, Colorado, U.S.
- Achievements: 1993 NASCAR Winston West Series Champion; 1991 NASCAR Featherlite Southwest Tour Champion
- Awards: West Coast Stock Car Hall of Fame (2009)

NASCAR Cup Series career
- 9 races run over 3 years
- Best finish: 49th (1993, 1994)
- First race: 1992 Save Mart Supermarkets 300 (Sears Point)
- Last race: 1994 Slick 50 300 (Phoenix)
Wins	Top tens	Poles
0	0	0

NASCAR O'Reilly Auto Parts Series career
- 2 races run over 2 years
- Best finish: 119th (2003)
- First race: 1998 Lycos.com 250 (Pikes Peak)
- Last race: 2003 TrimSpa Dream Body 250 (Pikes Peak)
Wins	Top tens	Poles
0	0	0

NASCAR FedEx Freight Truck Series career
- 134 races run over 8 years
- Best finish: 6th (1995)
- First race: 1995 Skoal Bandit Copper World Classic (Phoenix)
- Last race: 2002 Florida Dodge Dealers 250 (Daytona)
- First win: 1996 Coca-Cola 200 (Bristol)
- Last win: 2000 Kroger 200 (Richmond)
Wins	Top tens	Poles
4	60	0

ARCA Menards Series career
- 18 races run over 5 years
- Best finish: 30th (2002)
- First race: 1992 NASCAR / ARCA Texas World Speedway Shootout (College Station)
- Last race: 2003 Flagstar 200 (Michigan)
Wins	Top tens	Poles
0	15	1

ARCA Menards Series West career
- 38 races run over 8 years
- Best finish: 1st (1993)
- First race: 1991 Motorcraft 500 (Evergreen)
- Last race: 2001 Pontiac Widetrack Grand Prix 200 (Fontana)
- First win: 1992 Vons 300 (Mesa Marin)
- Last win: 1994 Talk 'N Toss 200 (Portland)
Wins	Top tens	Poles
9	28	5
- Statistics up to date as of May 21, 2025.

Richard Dean Carelli (born November 9, 1954) is an American former race car driver from Arvada, Colorado. He was nicknamed the "High Plains Drifter". He won multiple times in the No. 6 NASCAR Craftsman Truck Series truck. He is the spotter for Erik Jones in the NASCAR Cup Series.

== Racing career ==
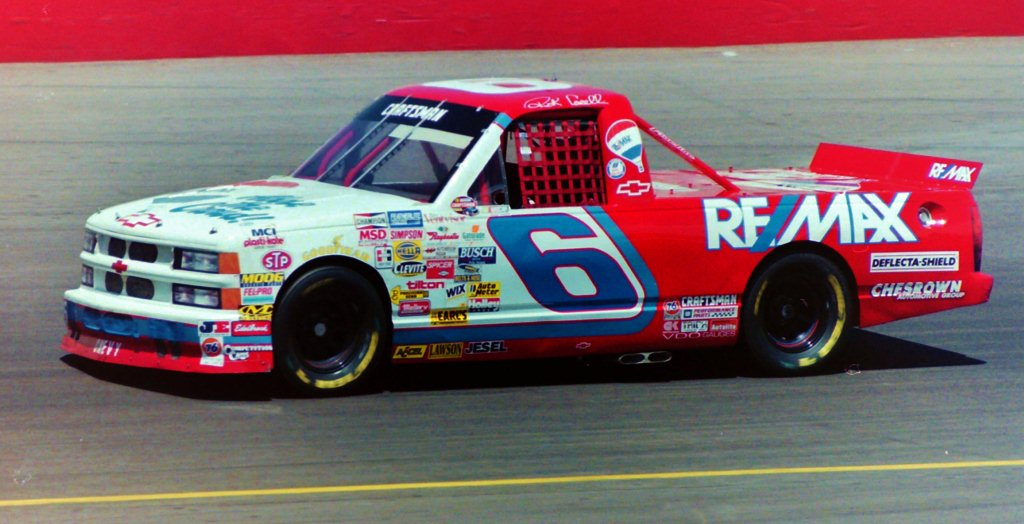
Carelli's 1997 Chesrown Racing truck

Carelli won the NASCAR Southwest Tour championship in 1991 and won 21 times in the series during his career. He joined the NASCAR Winston West Series in 1992, and he was named the series Rookie of the Year. He returned to the series in 1993, capturing the series championship and Most Popular Driver award. He has won nine times in that series.

Carelli was one of the original drivers in the NASCAR Craftsman Truck Series, starting at the series' first race at Phoenix in 1995. Carelli raced every series race until he suffered near-fatal injuries when his truck hit the wall during a race at Memphis Motorsports Park in 1999. He suffered a basilar skull fracture and damaged his carotid artery and sinus. He recovered and returned to race the entire 2000 season. He won another race at Richmond International Raceway in 2000 with an underfunded team that he was the crew chief for. He also made nine NASCAR Winston Cup starts from 1992 to 1994. He stopped driving in 2004 and moved into the administrative side of motorsport.

After retiring from driving, Carelli later became the team manager for Kevin Harvick Incorporated – a position that he held when Ron Hornaday won the 2007 championship. He later worked with NTS Motorsports as the team general manager. Carelli was also the spotter for the Stewart–Haas Racing No. 41, driven by Kurt Busch after first working with him at Furniture Row Racing; FRR's general manager Joe Garone was Carelli's crew chief from 1989 to 1994. He later became Erik Jones' spotter at FRR before following him to Joe Gibbs Racing and Richard Petty Motorsports.

== Awards ==
Carelli was inducted in the West Coast Stock Car Hall of Fame in 2009 along with Wayne Spears, Doug George, and Chuck Bown.

== Motorsports career results ==
=== NASCAR ===
(key) (Bold – Pole position awarded by qualifying time. Italics – Pole position earned by points standings or practice time. * – Most laps led.)

==== Winston Cup Series ====
NASCAR Winston Cup Series results
Year	Team	No.	Make	1	2	3	4	5	6	7	8	9	10	11	12	13	14	15	16	17	18	19	20	21	22	23	24	25	26	27	28	29	30	31	NWCC	Pts	Ref
1991	Chesrown Racing	37	Chevy	DAY	RCH	CAR	ATL	DAR	BRI	NWS	MAR	TAL	CLT	DOV	SON	POC	MCH	DAY	POC	TAL	GLN	MCH	BRI	DAR	RCH	DOV	MAR	NWS	CLT	CAR	PHO; DNQ	ATL			NA	-	
1992	Chesrown Racing	37	Chevy	DAY	CAR	RCH	ATL	DAR	BRI	NWS	MAR	TAL	CLT	DOV	SON; 37	POC	MCH	DAY	POC	TAL	GLN	MCH	BRI	DAR	RCH	DOV	MAR	NWS	CLT	CAR	PHO; 42	ATL			74th	89	
1993	Chesrown Racing	61	Chevy	DAY	CAR	RCH; DNQ	ATL; DNQ	DAR	BRI	NWS	MAR	TAL																				PHO; 21	ATL; 35		49th	258	
1993	Chesrown Racing	37	Chevy										SON; 21	CLT	DOV	POC	MCH	DAY	NHA	POC	TAL	GLN	MCH	BRI	DAR	RCH	DOV	MAR	NWS	CLT	CAR				49th	258	
1994	Chesrown Racing	61	Chevy	DAY; DNQ	CAR; DNQ	RCH; DNQ	ATL; DNQ	DAR; DNQ	BRI	NWS	MAR	TAL	SON; 41	CLT	DOV	POC	MCH; DNQ	DAY	NHA	POC	TAL	IND; DNQ	GLN	MCH; 27	BRI	DAR; DNQ	RCH	DOV	MAR	NWS	CLT	CAR; 22	PHO; 33	ATL; DNQ	49th	283	

==== Busch Series ====
NASCAR Busch Series results
Year	Team	No.	Make	1	2	3	4	5	6	7	8	9	10	11	12	13	14	15	16	17	18	19	20	21	22	23	24	25	26	27	28	29	30	31	32	33	34	NBC	Pts	Ref
1990	Chesrown Racing	46	Pontiac	DAY	RCH	CAR	MAR	HCY	DAR	BRI	LAN	SBO	NZH	HCY	CLT	DOV; DNQ	ROU	VOL	MYB	OXF	NHA	SBO	DUB	IRP	ROU	BRI	DAR	RCH	DOV	MAR	CLT	NHA	CAR	MAR				NA	-	
1998	Phoenix Racing	41	Chevy	DAY	CAR	LVS	NSV	DAR	BRI	TEX	HCY	TAL	NHA	NZH	CLT	DOV	RCH	PPR; 42	GLN	MLW	MYB	CAL	SBO	IRP	MCH	BRI	DAR	RCH	DOV	CLT	GTY	CAR	ATL	HOM				126th	0	
2000	Ken Schrader Racing	86	Chevy	DAY	CAR	LVS	ATL	DAR	BRI	TEX	NSV	TAL	CAL	RCH	NHA	CLT	DOV	SBO	MYB	GLN	MLW	NZH	PPR	GTY	IRP	MCH	BRI	DAR	RCH	DOV	CLT	CAR	MEM	PHO; DNQ	HOM			NA	-	
2003	Biagi Brothers Racing	4	Chevy	DAY	CAR	LVS	DAR	BRI	TEX	TAL	NSH	CAL	RCH	GTY	NZH	CLT	DOV	NSH	KEN	MLW	DAY	CHI	NHA	PPR; 19	IRP	MCH	BRI	DAR	RCH	DOV	KAN	CLT	MEM	ATL	PHO	CAR	HOM	119th	106	

==== Craftsman Truck Series ====
NASCAR Craftsman Truck Series results
Year	Team	No.	Make	1	2	3	4	5	6	7	8	9	10	11	12	13	14	15	16	17	18	19	20	21	22	23	24	25	26	27	NCTC	Pts	Ref
1995	Chesrown Racing	6	Chevy	PHO; 24	TUS; 3	SGS; 9	MMR; 12	POR; 8	EVG; 8	I70; 6	LVL; 5	BRI; 23	MLW; 4	CNS; 7	HPT; 11	IRP; 3	FLM; 2	RCH; 12	MAR; 29	NWS; 12	SON; 15	MMR; 11	PHO; 11								6th	2683	
1996	Chesrown Racing	6	Chevy	HOM; 16	PHO; 6	POR; 6	EVG; 13	TUS; 23	CNS; 19	HPT; 24	BRI; 1	NZH; 16	MLW; 11	LVL; 7	I70; 3	IRP; 18	FLM; 7	GLN; 24	NSV; 9	RCH; 15	NHA; 13	MAR; 29	NWS; 6	SON; 9	MMR; 34	PHO; 16	LVS; 14				10th	2953	
1997	Chesrown Racing	6	Chevy	WDW; 5	TUS; 30	HOM; 8	PHO; 10	POR; 28	EVG; 19	I70; 7	NHA; 3	TEX; 22	BRI; 4	NZH; 6	MLW; 5	LVL; 19	CNS; 7	HPT; 9	IRP; 8	FLM; 5	NSV; 10	GLN; 10	RCH; 11	MAR; 15	SON; 7	MMR; 12	CAL; 15	PHO; 5	LVS; 6		7th	3461	
1998	Chesrown Racing	6	Chevy	WDW; 3	HOM; 18	PHO; 17	POR; 3	EVG; 7	I70; 32	GLN; 28	TEX; 9	BRI; 30	MLW; 6	NZH; 9	CAL; 16	PPR; 4	IRP; 17	NHA; 20	FLM; 16	NSV; 17	HPT; 30	LVL; 31	RCH; 8	MEM; 30	GTY; 1*	MAR; 11	SON; 11	MMR; 6	PHO; 11	LVS; 35	11th	3195	
1999	Chesrown Racing	6	Chevy	HOM; 10	PHO; 27	EVG; 6	MMR; 1	MAR; 9	MEM; 36	PPR	I70	BRI	TEX	PIR	GLN	MLW	NSV	NZH	MCH	NHA	IRP	GTY	HPT	RCH	LVS	LVL	TEX	CAL			33rd	739	
2000	Phelon Motorsports	66	Ford	DAY; 7	HOM; 34	PHO; 26	MMR; 20	MAR; 33	PIR; 17	GTY; 29	MEM; 34	PPR; 20	EVG; 7	TEX; 31	KEN; 7	GLN; 32	MLW; 13	NHA; 11	NZH; 8	MCH; 31	IRP; 24	NSV; 23	CIC; 5	RCH; 1	DOV; 8	TEX; 9	CAL; 21				15th	2606	
2001	Phelon Motorsports	66	Ford	DAY; 13																											40th	675	
2001	Phelon Motorsports	66	Chevy		HOM; 30	MMR; 4	MAR; 12	GTY	DAR	PPR	DOV	TEX	MEM	MLW	KAN	KEN	NHA	IRP	NSH	CIC	NZH										40th	675	
2001	Petty Brothers Racing	44	Dodge																			RCH; 34	SBO	TEX	LVS						40th	675	
2001	Harvick Motorsports	6	Chevy																							PHO; 11	CAL				40th	675	
2002	Harvick Motorsports	6	Chevy	DAY; 5	DAR	MAR	GTY	PPR	DOV	TEX	MEM	MLW	KAN	KEN	NHA	MCH	IRP	NSH	RCH	TEX	SBO	LVS	CAL	PHO	HOM						72nd	160	

==== Winston West Series ====
NASCAR Winston West Series results
Year	Team	No.	Make	1	2	3	4	5	6	7	8	9	10	11	12	13	14	15	NWWSC	Pts	Ref
1991	Chesrown Racing	37	Chevy	EVG	MMR	SON	SGS	POR	EVG; 27	SSS	MMR; 2	PHO; DNQ							24th	391	
1992	Chesrown Racing	37	Chevy	MMR; 1*	SGS; 1*	SON; 37	SHA; 4*	POR; 10	EVG; 4	SSS; 1	CAJ; 14	TWS; 6	MMR; 2	PHO; 42					3rd	1765	
1993	Chesrown Racing	37	Chevy	TWS; 8	MMR; 4	**SGS**; 1*	SON; 21	TUS; 9	**SHA**; 1*	EVG; 1*	POR; 2*	**CBS**; 1*	SSS; 4	**CAJ**; 1	**TCR**; 8				1st	2390	
1993	Chesrown Racing	61	Chevy													MMR; 3	PHO; 21		1st	2390	
1994	Chesrown Racing	61	Chevy	MMR	TUS	SON; 41	SGS	YAK	MMR	POR; 1	IND; DNQ	CAJ	TCR	LVS	MMR; 10	PHO; 33	TUS		19th	804	
1995	Chesrown Racing	61	Chevy	TUS	MMR	SON	CNS; 6	MMR	POR	SGS	TUS	AMP	MAD	POR	LVS	SON	MMR	PHO	46th	150	
1996	Chesrown Racing	61	Chevy	TUS; 5	AMP	MMR	SON	MAD	POR	TUS	EVG	CNS; 15	MAD	MMR	SON	MMR	PHO	LVS	34th	273	
1999	Chesrown Racing	57	Chevy	TUS; 4	LVS; 16	PHO	CAL; 3	PPR	MMR	IRW	EVG	POR	IRW	RMR	LVS	MMR	MOT		32nd	445	
2001	Team Re/MAX Racing	05	Chevy	PHO	LVS	TUS	MMR	CAL; 9	IRW	LAG	KAN	EVG	CNS	IRW	RMR	LVS	IRW		47th	143	

=== ARCA Re/Max Series ===
(key) (Bold – Pole position awarded by qualifying time. Italics – Pole position earned by points standings or practice time. * – Most laps led.)

ARCA Re/Max Series results
Year	Team	No.	Make	1	2	3	4	5	6	7	8	9	10	11	12	13	14	15	16	17	18	19	20	21	22	23	24	25	ARSC	Pts	Ref
1992	Chesrown Racing	37	Chevy	DAY	FIF	TWS	TAL	TOL	KIL	POC	MCH	FRS	KIL	NSH	DEL	POC	HPT	FRS	ISF	TOL	DSF	TWS; 6	SLM	ATL					N/A	–	
1993	Chesrown Racing	37	Chevy	DAY	FIF	TWS; 8	TAL	KIL	CMS	FRS	TOL	POC	MCH	FRS	POC	KIL	ISF	DSF	TOL	SLM	WIN	ATL							N/A	–	
2001	Team Re/MAX Racing	05	Chevy	DAY	NSH; 4	WIN	SLM	GTY; 5	KEN	CLT	KAN	MCH; 8	POC	**MEM**; 2	GLN	KEN	MCH; 4	POC	NSH	ISF	CHI	DSF	SLM	TOL	BLN	CLT; 40	TAL; 3	ATL	31st	1285	
2002	Team Re/MAX Racing	05	Chevy	DAY; 2	ATL	NSH	SLM	KEN	CLT	KAN; 38	POC; 3	MCH; 36	TOL	SBO	KEN	BLN	POC	NSH	ISF	WIN	DSF	CHI; 2	SLM	TAL; 4	CLT				30th	975	
2003	Team Re/MAX Racing	05	Chevy	DAY; 6	ATL	NSH; 10	SLM	TOL	KEN	CLT	BLN	KAN; 5	MCH; 27	LER	POC	POC	NSH	ISF	WIN	DSF	CHI	SLM	TAL	CLT	SBO				39th	700	

=== 24 Hours of Daytona ===
(key)

24 Hours of Daytona results
Year	Class	No	Team	Car	Co-drivers	Laps	Position	Class Pos.
2002	AGT	90	(United States) Flis Motorsports	Chevy Corvette	(United States) Kevin Harvick (United States) John Metcalf (United States) Davy Lee Liniger	123	69 ^{DNF}	8 ^{DNF}
2003	GTS	05	(United States) Team Re/MAX Racing	Chevy Corvette	(United States) Craig Conway (United States) John Metcalf (United States) Davy Lee Liniger	378	27 ^{DNF}	8 ^{DNF}

Achievements
Preceded by Bill Sedgwick	NASCAR Winston West Series champion 1993	Succeeded by Mike Chase
Preceded by Doug George	NASCAR Featherlite Southwest Tour champion 1991	Succeeded by Ron Hornaday Jr.
