= 1994 Winston Select 500 =

Ninth race of the 1994 NASCAR Winston Cup Series

Race details
- Race 9 of 31 in the 1994 NASCAR Winston Cup Series
- The 1994 Winston Select 500 program cover.
- Date: May 1, 1994
- Official name: 25th Annual Winston Select 500
- Location: Lincoln, Alabama, Talladega Superspeedway
- Course: Permanent racing facility
- Course length: 2.66 miles (4.28 km)
- Distance: 188 laps, 500.08 mi (804.8 km)
- Average speed: 157.478 miles per hour (253.436 km/h)
- Attendance: 150,000

Pole position
Driver	Ernie Irvan	Robert Yates Racing
- Time: 49.540

Most laps led
Driver	Ernie Irvan	Robert Yates Racing
- Laps: 78

Winner
No. 3	Dale Earnhardt	Richard Childress Racing

Television in the United States
- Network: ESPN
- Announcers: Bob Jenkins, Ned Jarrett, Benny Parsons

Radio in the United States
- Radio: Motor Racing Network

The 1994 Winston Select 500 was the ninth stock car race of the 1994 NASCAR Winston Cup Series season and the 25th iteration of the event. The race was held on Sunday, May 1, 1994, before an audience of 150,000 in Lincoln, Alabama, at Talladega Superspeedway, a 2.66-mile (4.28 km) permanent triangle-shaped superspeedway. The race took the scheduled 188 laps to complete. In the final laps of the race, Richard Childress Racing driver Dale Earnhardt would make a charge to the front with six to go, defending the lead for the final five laps to take his 62nd career NASCAR Winston Cup Series victory and his third victory of the season. Earnhardt dedicated his win to the late Ayrton Senna, who lost his life earlier that day in a crash at the 1994 San Marino Grand Prix. To fill out the top three, Robert Yates Racing driver Ernie Irvan and Bahari Racing driver Michael Waltrip would finish second and third, respectively.

== Background ==
The layout of Talladega Superspeedway, the venue where the race was held.

Talladega Superspeedway, originally known as Alabama International Motor Superspeedway (AIMS), is a motorsports complex located north of Talladega, Alabama. It is located on the former Anniston Air Force Base in the small city of Lincoln. The track is a tri-oval and was constructed in the 1960s by the International Speedway Corporation, a business controlled by the France family. Talladega is most known for its steep banking and the unique location of the start/finish line that's located just past the exit to pit road. The track currently hosts the NASCAR series such as the NASCAR Cup Series, Xfinity Series and the Camping World Truck Series. Talladega is the longest NASCAR oval, a 2.66-mile-long (4.28 km) tri-oval like the Daytona International Speedway, which also is a 2.5-mile-long (4.0 km) tri-oval.

=== Entry list ===
- (R) denotes rookie driver.

#	Driver	Team	Make
0	Delma Cowart	H. L. Waters Racing	Ford
1	Rick Mast	Precision Products Racing	Ford
2	Rusty Wallace	Penske Racing South	Ford
02	Ronnie Sanders	Taylor Racing	Ford
3	Dale Earnhardt	Richard Childress Racing	Chevrolet
4	Sterling Marlin	Morgan–McClure Motorsports	Chevrolet
5	Terry Labonte	Hendrick Motorsports	Chevrolet
6	Mark Martin	Roush Racing	Ford
7	Geoff Bodine	Geoff Bodine Racing	Ford
8	Jeff Burton (R)	Stavola Brothers Racing	Ford
9	Rich Bickle (R)	Melling Racing	Ford
10	Ricky Rudd	Rudd Performance Motorsports	Ford
11	Bill Elliott	Junior Johnson & Associates	Ford
12	Chuck Bown	Bobby Allison Motorsports	Ford
14	John Andretti (R)	Hagan Racing	Chevrolet
15	Lake Speed	Bud Moore Engineering	Ford
16	Ted Musgrave	Roush Racing	Ford
17	Darrell Waltrip	Darrell Waltrip Motorsports	Chevrolet
18	Dale Jarrett	Joe Gibbs Racing	Chevrolet
19	Loy Allen Jr. (R)	TriStar Motorsports	Ford
21	Morgan Shepherd	Wood Brothers Racing	Ford
22	Bobby Labonte	Bill Davis Racing	Pontiac
23	Hut Stricklin	Travis Carter Enterprises	Ford
24	Jeff Gordon	Hendrick Motorsports	Chevrolet
25	Ken Schrader	Hendrick Motorsports	Chevrolet
26	Brett Bodine	King Racing	Ford
27	Jimmy Spencer	Junior Johnson & Associates	Ford
28	Ernie Irvan	Robert Yates Racing	Ford
29	Steve Grissom	Diamond Ridge Motorsports	Chevrolet
30	Michael Waltrip	Bahari Racing	Pontiac
31	Ward Burton	A.G. Dillard Motorsports	Chevrolet
32	Dick Trickle	Active Motorsports	Chevrolet
33	Harry Gant	Leo Jackson Motorsports	Chevrolet
40	Bobby Hamilton	SABCO Racing	Pontiac
41	Joe Nemechek (R)	Larry Hedrick Motorsports	Chevrolet
42	Kyle Petty	SABCO Racing	Pontiac
43	Wally Dallenbach Jr.	Petty Enterprises	Pontiac
51	Jeff Purvis	Phoenix Racing	Chevrolet
52	Kirk Shelmerdine	Jimmy Means Racing	Ford
53	Ritchie Petty	Petty Brothers Racing	Ford
55	Jimmy Hensley	RaDiUs Motorsports	Ford
71	Dave Marcis	Marcis Auto Racing	Chevrolet
75	Todd Bodine	Butch Mock Motorsports	Ford
77	Greg Sacks	U.S. Motorsports Inc.	Ford
80	Jimmy Horton	Hover Motorsports	Ford
89	Jim Sauter	Mueller Racing	Ford
90	Mike Wallace (R)	Donlavey Racing	Ford
95	Jeremy Mayfield (R)	Sadler Brothers Racing	Ford
98	Derrike Cope	Cale Yarborough Motorsports	Ford

== Qualifying ==
Qualifying was split into two rounds. The first round was held on Friday, April 29, at 4:00 PM EST. Each driver would have one lap to set a time. During the first round, the top 20 drivers in the round would be guaranteed a starting spot in the race. If a driver was not able to guarantee a spot in the first round, they had the option to scrub their time from the first round and try and run a faster lap time in a second round qualifying run, held on Saturday, April 30, at 11:30 AM EST. As with the first round, each driver would have one lap to set a time. For this specific race, positions 21-40 would be decided on time, and depending on who needed it, a select amount of positions were given to cars who had not otherwise qualified but were high enough in owner's points; up to two provisionals were given. If needed, a past champion who did not qualify on either time or provisionals could use a champion's provisional, adding one more spot to the field.

Ernie Irvan, driving for Robert Yates Racing, would win the pole, setting a time of 49.540 and an average speed of 193.298 miles per hour (311.083 km/h) in the first round.

Seven drivers would fail to qualify.

=== Full qualifying results ===
Pos.	#	Driver	Team	Make	Time	Speed
1	28	Ernie Irvan	Robert Yates Racing	Ford	49.540	193.298
2	19	Loy Allen Jr. (R)	TriStar Motorsports	Ford	49.567	193.193
3	75	Todd Bodine	Butch Mock Motorsports	Ford	49.649	192.874
4	3	Dale Earnhardt	Richard Childress Racing	Chevrolet	49.687	192.726
5	27	Jimmy Spencer	Junior Johnson & Associates	Ford	49.837	192.146
6	77	Greg Sacks	U.S. Motorsports Inc.	Ford	49.861	192.054
7	25	Ken Schrader	Hendrick Motorsports	Chevrolet	49.929	191.792
8	30	Michael Waltrip	Bahari Racing	Pontiac	49.972	191.627
9	18	Dale Jarrett	Joe Gibbs Racing	Chevrolet	50.008	191.489
10	4	Sterling Marlin	Morgan–McClure Motorsports	Chevrolet	50.022	191.436
11	29	Steve Grissom (R)	Diamond Ridge Motorsports	Chevrolet	50.150	190.947
12	21	Morgan Shepherd	Wood Brothers Racing	Ford	50.176	190.848
13	33	Harry Gant	Leo Jackson Motorsports	Chevrolet	50.184	190.818
14	12	Chuck Bown	Bobby Allison Motorsports	Ford	50.310	190.340
15	6	Mark Martin	Roush Racing	Ford	50.321	190.298
16	17	Darrell Waltrip	Darrell Waltrip Motorsports	Chevrolet	50.343	190.215
17	16	Ted Musgrave	Roush Racing	Ford	50.407	189.974
18	15	Lake Speed	Bud Moore Engineering	Ford	50.439	189.853
19	90	Mike Wallace (R)	Donlavey Racing	Ford	50.441	189.846
20	2	Rusty Wallace	Penske Racing South	Ford	50.499	189.628
Failed to lock in Round 1
21	5	Terry Labonte	Hendrick Motorsports	Chevrolet	50.208	190.727
22	71	Dave Marcis	Marcis Auto Racing	Chevrolet	50.420	189.925
23	7	Geoff Bodine	Geoff Bodine Racing	Ford	50.473	189.725
24	95	Jeremy Mayfield (R)	Sadlers Brothers Racing	Ford	50.544	189.459
25	1	Rick Mast	Precision Products Racing	Ford	50.547	189.447
26	23	Hut Stricklin	Travis Carter Enterprises	Ford	50.591	189.283
27	42	Kyle Petty	SABCO Racing	Pontiac	50.599	189.253
28	26	Brett Bodine	King Racing	Ford	50.613	189.200
29	55	Jimmy Hensley	RaDiUs Motorsports	Ford	50.652	189.055
30	11	Bill Elliott	Junior Johnson & Associates	Ford	50.655	189.044
31	98	Derrike Cope	Cale Yarborough Motorsports	Ford	50.659	189.029
32	51	Jeff Purvis	Phoenix Racing	Chevrolet	50.669	188.991
33	10	Ricky Rudd	Rudd Performance Motorsports	Ford	50.680	188.950
34	8	Jeff Burton (R)	Stavola Brothers Racing	Ford	50.684	188.935
35	43	Wally Dallenbach Jr.	Petty Enterprises	Pontiac	50.708	188.846
36	14	John Andretti (R)	Hagan Racing	Chevrolet	50.755	188.671
37	41	Joe Nemechek (R)	Larry Hedrick Motorsports	Chevrolet	50.782	188.571
38	32	Dick Trickle	Active Motorsports	Chevrolet	50.789	188.545
39	40	Bobby Hamilton	SABCO Racing	Pontiac	50.792	188.534
40	24	Jeff Gordon	Hendrick Motorsports	Chevrolet	50.892	188.163
Provisionals
41	22	Bobby Labonte	Bill Davis Racing	Pontiac	51.023	187.680
42	52	Kirk Shelmerdine	Jimmy Means Racing	Ford	51.099	187.401
Failed to qualify
43	53	Ritchie Petty	Petty Brothers Racing	Ford	50.904	188.119
44	89	Jim Sauter	Mueller Racing	Ford	50.977	187.849
45	9	Rich Bickle (R)	Melling Racing	Ford	51.016	187.706
46	80	Jimmy Horton	Hover Motorsports	Ford	51.052	187.573
47	02	Ronnie Sanders	Taylor Racing	Ford	52.010	184.118
48	31	Ward Burton (R)	A.G. Dillard Motorsports	Chevrolet	52.634	181.936
49	0	Delma Cowart	H. L. Waters Racing	Ford	56.325	170.013
Official first round qualifying results
Official starting lineup

== Race results ==
Fin	St	#	Driver	Team	Make	Laps	Led	Status	Pts	Winnings
1	4	3	Dale Earnhardt	Richard Childress Racing	Chevrolet	188	64	running	180	$94,865
2	1	28	Ernie Irvan	Robert Yates Racing	Ford	188	78	running	180	$67,990
3	8	30	Michael Waltrip	Bahari Racing	Pontiac	188	0	running	165	$50,995
4	5	27	Jimmy Spencer	Junior Johnson & Associates	Ford	188	14	running	165	$32,570
5	7	25	Ken Schrader	Hendrick Motorsports	Chevrolet	188	1	running	160	$33,540
6	6	77	Greg Sacks	U.S. Motorsports Inc.	Ford	188	1	running	155	$19,905
7	18	15	Lake Speed	Bud Moore Engineering	Ford	188	0	running	146	$28,300
8	10	4	Sterling Marlin	Morgan–McClure Motorsports	Chevrolet	188	10	running	147	$26,850
9	12	21	Morgan Shepherd	Wood Brothers Racing	Ford	188	1	running	143	$25,550
10	11	29	Steve Grissom (R)	Diamond Ridge Motorsports	Chevrolet	188	0	running	134	$18,600
11	17	16	Ted Musgrave	Roush Racing	Ford	188	0	running	130	$20,495
12	39	40	Bobby Hamilton	SABCO Racing	Pontiac	188	1	running	132	$21,915
13	27	42	Kyle Petty	SABCO Racing	Pontiac	188	0	running	124	$23,185
14	16	17	Darrell Waltrip	Darrell Waltrip Motorsports	Chevrolet	188	0	running	121	$19,005
15	19	90	Mike Wallace (R)	Donlavey Racing	Ford	188	0	running	118	$15,325
16	22	71	Dave Marcis	Marcis Auto Racing	Chevrolet	188	5	running	120	$14,235
17	28	26	Brett Bodine	King Racing	Ford	188	0	running	112	$17,420
18	26	23	Hut Stricklin	Travis Carter Enterprises	Ford	187	0	running	109	$10,180
19	30	11	Bill Elliott	Junior Johnson & Associates	Ford	187	0	running	106	$16,790
20	25	1	Rick Mast	Precision Products Racing	Ford	187	0	running	103	$17,130
21	9	18	Dale Jarrett	Joe Gibbs Racing	Chevrolet	186	0	running	100	$20,860
22	41	22	Bobby Labonte	Bill Davis Racing	Pontiac	186	0	running	97	$15,940
23	13	33	Harry Gant	Leo Jackson Motorsports	Chevrolet	184	0	running	94	$15,730
24	40	24	Jeff Gordon	Hendrick Motorsports	Chevrolet	184	3	running	96	$15,525
25	33	10	Ricky Rudd	Rudd Performance Motorsports	Ford	180	0	running	88	$9,045
26	42	52	Kirk Shelmerdine	Jimmy Means Racing	Ford	179	0	running	85	$11,265
27	14	12	Chuck Bown	Bobby Allison Motorsports	Ford	168	0	running	82	$15,110
28	3	75	Todd Bodine	Butch Mock Motorsports	Ford	160	10	running	84	$11,155
29	36	14	John Andretti (R)	Hagan Racing	Chevrolet	128	0	engine	76	$14,800
30	29	55	Jimmy Hensley	RaDiUs Motorsports	Ford	121	0	crash	73	$10,745
31	31	98	Derrike Cope	Cale Yarborough Motorsports	Ford	115	0	crash	70	$10,115
32	21	5	Terry Labonte	Hendrick Motorsports	Chevrolet	112	0	crash	67	$19,060
33	20	2	Rusty Wallace	Penske Racing South	Ford	112	0	crash	64	$20,730
34	35	43	Wally Dallenbach Jr.	Petty Enterprises	Pontiac	112	0	crash	61	$8,500
35	32	51	Jeff Purvis	Phoenix Racing	Chevrolet	112	0	crash	58	$8,470
36	38	32	Dick Trickle	Active Motorsports	Chevrolet	112	0	crash	55	$8,440
37	24	95	Jeremy Mayfield (R)	Sadlers Brothers Racing	Ford	110	0	crash	52	$8,360
38	15	6	Mark Martin	Roush Racing	Ford	103	0	crash	49	$20,106
39	34	8	Jeff Burton (R)	Stavola Brothers Racing	Ford	102	0	crash	46	$12,250
40	2	19	Loy Allen Jr. (R)	TriStar Motorsports	Ford	102	0	crash	43	$8,720
41	23	7	Geoff Bodine	Geoff Bodine Racing	Ford	76	0	crash	40	$12,220
42	37	41	Joe Nemechek (R)	Larry Hedrick Motorsports	Chevrolet	75	0	engine	37	$8,720
Official race results

== Standings after the race ==
Drivers' Championship standings

	Pos	Driver	Points
	1	Ernie Irvan	1,454
	2	Dale Earnhardt	1,429 (-25)
	3	Mark Martin	1,227 (-227)
1	4	Ken Schrader	1,211 (–243)
1	5	Lake Speed	1,158 (–296)
2	6	Morgan Shepherd	1,144 (–310)
3	7	Rusty Wallace	1,135 (–319)
2	8	Sterling Marlin	1,098 (–356)
2	9	Ricky Rudd	1,094 (–360)
1	10	Kyle Petty	1,074 (–380)
Official driver's standings

- Note: Only the first 10 positions are included for the driver standings.

Previous race: 1994 Hanes 500	NASCAR Winston Cup Series; 1994 season	Next race: 1994 Save Mart Supermarkets 300
