= Cajon Speedway =

Former oval race track in California, US

- Location: El Cajon, California
- Coordinates: 32°49′19.5″N 116°58′05.7″W
- Owner: Brucker family
- Broke ground: 1961
- Closed: 2005
- Surface: Asphalt
- Length: 0.375 miles
- Turns: 4
- Race lap record: 0:13.422 (Davey Hamilton, , 1990, WSMRA Super Modified)

Cajon Speedway was an oval race track near El Cajon, California.

== History ==
Located between Gillespie Field and the San Vicente Freeway, the 0.25 mile dirt oval track opened in 1961. Named Cajon Speedway, the track expanded to a 0.375 mile dirt track in 1964. The 0.375 mile oval was paved. The track was founded by Earle Brucker Sr., who also founded El Cajon Stock Car Racing Association (ECSCRA). In 1978, the ECSCRA Super Stocks championship was won by Ron Esau. Between 1986 and 2004, local drivers also competed for the Whelen All-American Series crown. John Borneman Jr., father of Johnny Borneman III, won the track championship in 1992. Ricky Johnson won the track championship in 1995.

In 2003, track owner Steve Brucker was murdered at his home in El Cajon. Brucker was able to call 911 before succumbing to his wounds at Sharp Memorial Hospital. Two men were charged with the murder which was the result of an attempted robbery. With the death of Brucker and the speedway lease ending in 2005, the track shut down after the 2004 racing season.

== Notable events ==
=== USAC National Midget Series ===
Year	Winner
1967	(United States) Bill Vukovich II
1968	(United States) Paul Bates

=== NASCAR Winston West Series ===
Year	Date	Winner
1973	23 July 1973	(United States) Dick Bown
1974	27 July 1974	(United States) Ray Elder
1992	15 August 1992	(United States) Bill Schmitt
1993	15 August 1993	(United States) Rick Carelli
1994	20 August 1994	(United States) Ron Hornaday Jr.

=== NASCAR Southwest Series ===
Year	Date	Winner
NASCAR Southwest Tour
1986	4 July 1986	(United States) Roman Calczynski
1987	4 April 1987	(United States) Dennis Dyer
1987	3 October 1987	(United States) Mike Chase
1988	9 April 1988	(United States) Troy Beebe
1988	1 October 1988	(United States) Troy Beebe
1989	1 April 1989	(United States) Ray Hooper Jr.
1989	7 October 1989	(United States) Roman Calczynski
1990	31 March 1990	(United States) Dan Press
1990	6 October 1990	(United States) Dan Press
1991	6 April 1991	(United States) Rick Carelli
NASCAR Featherlite Southwest Tour
1992	2 April 1992	(United States) Rick Carelli
1993	2 April 1993	(United States) M.K. Kanke
1994	16 July 1994	(United States) Dale Williams
1995	25 March 1995	(United States) Craig Raudman
1996	30 March 1996	(United States) Chris Raudman
1997	29 March 1997	(United States) Chris Raudman
1998	11 July 1998	(United States) Matt Crafton
2000	3 June 2000	(United States) Jon Nelson
2001	24 March 2001	(United States) M.K. Kanke
2002	23 March 2002	(United States) M.K. Kanke
2003	5 April 2003	(United States) Mark Meech
NASCAR AutoZone Elite Division, Southwest Series
2004	3 April 2004	(United States) Jeff Seifert

=== USF2000 ===
Year	Date	Winner
1990	4 July 1990	(United States) Bob Lesnett
