= 1993 NASCAR Winston West Series =

40th season of the NASCAR Winston West Series

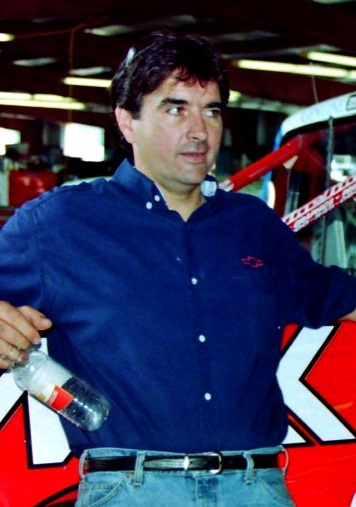
Rick Carelli, the 1993 West Series champion.

The 1993 NASCAR Winston West Series was the 40th season of the series. The title was won by Rick Carelli, his first in the series.

== Teams and drivers ==
=== Complete schedule ===
Manufacturer	Team	No.	Driver
Chevrolet	Chesrown Racing	37	Rick Carelli
Chevrolet	Spears Motorsports	75	Bill Sedgwick 12
Chevrolet	Spears Motorsports	75	Ron Esau 1
Chevrolet	Spears Motorsports	75	Ron Hornaday Jr. 1
Ford	Tom Craigen	20	Dirk Stephens
Pontiac	Jacks Motorsports	58	Wayne Jacks
Chevrolet 13 Pontiac 1	Sellers Racing	48	Jack Sellers

=== Limited schedule ===
Manufacturer	Team	No.	Driver	Races
Chevrolet	Adele Emerson	41	Chuck Welch	1
Chevrolet	Adele Emerson	44	Chuck Welch	7
Chevrolet	Adele Emerson	44	Tom Taylor	1
Chevrolet	Adele Emerson	44	Bob Lyon	1
Chevrolet	Collins Motorsports	28	Gary Collins	2
Chevrolet	Diamond Ridge Racing	29	John Krebs	5
Chevrolet	Diaz Racing	77	Jimmy Dick	2
Chevrolet	Jack McCoy Enterprises	05	Jason Fensler	2
Chevrolet	Jeanie Hunt	56	Tony Hunt	9
Chevrolet	JTC Racing	50	Mike Chase	3
Chevrolet	Ken Schrader Racing	25	Ken Schrader	2
Chevrolet	Ken Schrader Racing	52	Gary Morris	1
Chevrolet	Leo Jackson Motorsports	33	Harry Gant	3
Chevrolet	Ron Hornaday Jr.	92	Ron Hornaday Jr.	3
Chevrolet	Scribner Racing	15	Rick Scribner	12
Chevrolet	TTC Motorsports Inc.	04	Hershel McGriff	8
Chevrolet	Unknown	16	Paul Banghart	1
Chevrolet	Unknown	97	Ron Hornaday Jr.	1
Ford	American Racing	16	Page Jones	1
Ford	Bay Cities Motorsports	91	Robert Sprague	5
Ford	Bobby Allison Motorsports	12	Jimmy Spencer	3
Ford	Dan Wade	95	Lance Wade	7
Ford	Jeff Davis Racing	81	Jeff Davis	3
Ford	Joe Heath	90	Joe Heath	4
Ford	Mark Rypien Motorsports	19	Chad Little	1
Ford	Mike Clark	49	Steve Sellers	3
Ford	NorCal Motorsports	5	Mike Chase	1
Ford	Schmitt Motorsports	28	Davey Allison	1
Ford	Stroppe Motorsports	16	Mike Hurlbert	1
Ford	Unknown	7	L. J. Pryor	5
Oldsmobile	Oliver Racing	00	Frank Adamo	1
Oldsmobile	Oliver Racing	00	Lance Hooper	1
Oldsmobile	Oliver Racing	00	Terry Henry	1
Oldsmobile	Woodland Racing	86	Rich Woodland Jr.	8
Oldsmobile	Woodland Racing	88	Butch Gilliland	1
Pontiac	Adele Emerson	49	Jim Courage	1
Pontiac	Adele Emerson	49	Chuck Welch	1
Pontiac	Adele Emerson	99	Tom Taylor	6
Pontiac	Adele Emerson	99	Chuck Welch	1
Pontiac	Adele Emerson	99	Jim Courage	1
Pontiac	Bill McAnally Racing	12	Bill McAnally	5
Pontiac	Diamond Ridge Racing	9	Gary Bechtel	1
Pontiac	FMR Motorsports	09	Steve Kunz	4
Pontiac	Gunselman Racing	60	Larry Gunselman	5
Pontiac	Jacks Motorsports	53	Ron Jacks	5
Pontiac	Jacks Motorsports	53	Buzz Woods	1
Pontiac	Larry Gaylord	68	Larry Gaylord	5
Pontiac	Lew Miller Racing	10	Ernie Cope	1
Pontiac	Marcis Auto Racing	71	Terry Fisher	1
Pontiac	Unknown	18	Bobby Goodwin Jr.	3
Pontiac	Unknown	57	Terry Fisher	1
Buick 1 Chevrolet 1	Beebe Racing	93	Troy Beebe	2
Chevrolet 8 Oldsmobile 1	Gilliland Racing	36	Butch Gilliland	9
Ford 5 Chevrolet 1	Schmitt Motorsports	73	Bill Schmitt	6
Ford 1 Pontiac 1	Jimmy Means Racing	52	Scott Gaylord	2

== Schedule and results ==
The 1993 season included 14 individual races, although Mesa Marin Raceway hosted two races. The season opener at Texas World Speedway was in combination with the ARCA Hooters SuperCar Series, and the races at Sears Point International Raceway and Phoenix International Raceway were in combination with the NASCAR Winston Cup Series.

Date	Name	Racetrack	Location	Winner
March 21	Western Auto Texas World Shootout II	Texas World Speedway	College Station, Texas	Darrell Waltrip
April 17	Spears Manufacturing 200	Mesa Marin Raceway	Bakersfield, California	Bill Sedgwick
April 24	Winston 200	Saugus Speedway	Saugus, California	Rick Carelli
May 16	Save Mart Supermarkets 300K	Sears Point International Raceway	Sonoma, California	Geoffrey Bodine
June 12	Valvoline 200	Tucson Raceway Park	Tucson, Arizona	Dirk Stephens
June 19	Holiday Quality Foods 200	Shasta Speedway	Anderson, California	Rick Carelli
June 27	Coors Light 500 by Puget Sound Ford Dealers	Evergreen Speedway	Monroe, Washington	Rick Carelli
July 4	Mello Yello 200 by Safeway	Portland Speedway	Portland, Oregon	Ken Schrader
July 18	Winston 200	Coos Bay Speedway	Coos Bay, Oregon	Rick Carelli
July 24	Uhlmann 200 by Pepsi	South Sound Speedway	Olympia, Washington	Dirk Stephens
August 14	Winston 200	Cajon Speedway	Santee, California	Rick Carelli
September 4	Winston 200	Tri-City Raceway	West Richland, Washington	Dirk Stephens
October 17	Meineke Discount Mufflers 300	Mesa Marin Raceway	Bakersfield, California	Bill Sedgwick
October 31	Slick 50 500	Phoenix International Raceway	Avondale, Arizona	Mark Martin

=== Western Auto Texas World Shootout II ===
The Western Auto Texas World Shootout II was held on March 21 at Texas World Speedway and was in combination with the ARCA Hooters SuperCar Series. Page Jones won the pole.

Top Ten Results

1. 17 - Darrell Waltrip
2. 52 - Ken Schrader -1
3. 16 - Tim Steele -1
4. 04 - Hershel McGriff -1
5. 3 - Dale Earnhardt -1
6. 20 - Dirk Stephens -2
7. 75 - Ron Esau -3
8. 37 - Rick Carelli -3
9. 02 - Frank Kimmel -4
10. 27 - Bob Brevak -6
- Three-time NASCAR Winston Cup Series champion Darrell Waltrip scored his second and final career ARCA Hooters SuperCar Series win, while Hershel McGriff was the highest finishing West Series driver, finishing fourth.

=== Spears Manufacturing 200 ===
The Spears Manufacturing 200 was held on April 17 at Mesa Marin Raceway. Hershel McGriff won the pole.

Top Ten Results

1. #75 - Bill Sedgwick
2. #04 - Hershel McGriff
3. #08 - Butch Gilliland
4. #37 - Rick Carelli
5. #16 - Page Jones
6. #5 - Mike Chase
7. #05 - Jason Fensler
8. #73 - Bill Schmitt
9. #29 - John Krebs
10. #20 - Dirk Stephens -1
- In a race that saw ten lead changes among seven different drivers, Bill Sedgwick would dominate the race, leading 110 of 200 laps en route to his first win of the season in his first start of the year. Hershel McGriff maintained a 25 point lead over Rick Carelli.

=== Winston 200 (Saugus) ===
The Winston 200 was held on April 24 at Saugus Speedway. Rick Carelli won the pole.

Top Ten Results

1. #37 - Rick Carelli
2. #20 - Dirk Stephens
3. #75 - Bill Sedgwick
4. #04 - Hershel McGriff
5. #00 - Lance Hooper -1
6. #58 - Wayne Jacks -2
7. #90 - Joe Heath -6
8. #36 - Butch Gilliland -23
9. #92 - Ron Hornaday Jr. -32
10. #48 - Jack Sellers -34
- After starting on pole, Rick Carelli would lead all but one lap in the 200-lap event and score his first win of the season. He ended the race just five points behind Hershel McGriff.

=== Save Mart Supermarkets 300K ===
The Save Mart Supermarkets 300K was held on May 16 at Sears Point International Raceway and was the first of two combination races with the NASCAR Winston Cup Series. Dale Earnhardt won the pole.

Top Ten Results

1. #15 - Geoffrey Bodine
2. #4 - Ernie Irvan
3. #5 - Ricky Rudd
4. #25 - Ken Schrader
5. #42 - Kyle Petty
6. #3 - Dale Earnhardt
7. #16 - Wally Dallenbach Jr.
8. #44 - Rick Wilson
9. #14 - Terry Labonte
10. #27 - Hut Stricklin

Failed to qualify: #09 - R. K. Smith, #48 - Jack Sellers, #51 - Rick Scribner, #52 - Scott Gaylord, #56 - Tony Hunt, #58 - Wayne Jacks

- This was the last victory for Bud Moore team.
- Geoff Bodine celebrated the victory at the same time as he was finalizing a deal to purchase the assets to the late Alan Kulwicki's team.
- Dale Earnhardt retook the Winston Cup championship lead in this race after points leader Rusty Wallace finished 38th due to overheating and transmission issues. Earnhardt would lead the standings for the rest of the year.
- With a sixteenth-place finish, Rick Carelli was the highest finishing Winston West driver and took the point lead from Hershel McGriff, who was now 28 points behind.

=== Valvoline 200 ===
The Valvoline 200 was held on June 12 at Tucson Raceway Park. Butch Gilliland won the pole.

1. #20 - Dirk Stephens
2. #36 - Butch Gilliland
3. #92 - Ron Hornaday Jr. -2
4. #15 - Rick Scribner -2
5. #99 - Chuck Welch -19
6. #95 - Lance Wade -21
7. #58 - Wayne Jacks -25
8. #04 - Hershel McGriff -31
9. #37 - Rick Carelli -31
10. #48 - Jack Sellers -32
- The race would end under yellow after the dominant car of Ron Hornaday Jr. crashed, handing the win to Dirk Stephens, his first of the season and first of his career. Despite not finishing the race, Hornaday was still scored third. Rick Carelli's points lead would shrink to four points over Stephens, who moved into second.

=== Holiday Quality Foods 200 ===
The Holiday Quality Foods 200 was held on June 19 at Shasta Speedway. Rick Carelli won the pole.

Top Ten Results

1. #37 - Rick Carelli
2. #75 - Bill Sedgwick
3. #58 - Wayne Jacks -1
4. #04 - Hershel McGriff -1
5. #20 - Dirk Stephens -3
6. #56 - Tony Hunt -3
7. #36 - Butch Gilliland -4
8. #15 - Rick Scribner -4
9. #86 - Rich Woodland Jr. -11
10. #99 - Jim Courage -24
- Polesitter Rick Carelli led 186 of the race's 200 laps and scored his second win of the season, extending his points advantage to 34 over Dirk Stephens.

=== Coors Light 500 by Puget Sound Ford Dealers ===
The Coors Light 500 by Puget Sound Ford Dealers was held on July 27 at Evergreen Speedway. Dirk Stephens won the pole.

Top Ten Results

1. #37 - Rick Carelli
2. #19 - Chad Little -3
3. #95 - Lance Wade -4
4. #75 - Bill Sedgwick -5
5. #04 - Hershel McGriff -6
6. #15 - Rick Scribner -16
7. #25 - Ken Schrader -22
8. #05 - Jason Fensler -26
9. #16 - Mike Hurlbert -32
10. #36 - Butch Gilliland -36
- In the longest race of the year, Rick Carelli led 337 of 500 laps en route to his second win in a row and third of the season. He extended his points lead to 74 over Hershel McGriff, who took second from Dirk Stephens.

=== Mello Yello 200 by Safeway ===
The Mello Yello 200 by Safeway was held on July 4 at Portland Speedway. Bill Sedgwick won the pole.

Top Ten Results

1. #25 - Ken Schrader
2. #37 - Rick Carelli
3. #75 - Bill Sedgwick -2
4. #20 - Dirk Stephens -3
5. #95 - Lance Wade -3
6. #04 - Hershel McGriff -4
7. #60 - Larry Gunselman -8
8. #56 - Tony Hunt -8
9. #44 - Chuck Welch -18
10. #48 - Jack Sellers -22
- Rick Carelli dominated the race, leading 144 of 200 laps, but Winston Cup driver Ken Schrader would score the win, his first in the series in his second start. Carelli extended his points lead to 104 over Hershel McGriff; McGriff would not compete in the series again until the following year.

=== Winston 200 (Coos Bay) ===
The Winston 200 was held on July 18 at Coos Bay Speedway. Rick Carelli won the pole.

Top Ten Results

1. #37 - Rick Carelli
2. #20 - Dirk Stephens
3. #91 - Robert Sprague -1
4. #75 - Bill Sedgwick -2
5. #58 - Wayne Jacks -3
6. #15 - Rick Scribner -3
7. #12 - Bill McAnally -6
8. #48 - Jack Sellers -8
9. #60 - Larry Gunselman -9
10. #44 - Chuck Welch -10
- Polesitter Rick Carelli led all 200 laps, scoring his fourth win of the season and extending his points lead to 122 over Dirk Stephens.

=== Uhlmann Motors 200 by Pepsi ===
The Uhlmann Motors 200 by Pepsi was held on July 24 at South Sound Speedway. Bill Sedgwick won the pole.

Top Ten Results

1. #20 - Dirk Stephens
2. #75 - Bill Sedgwick
3. #91 - Robert Sprague
4. #37 - Rick Carelli
5. #60 - Larry Gunselman -5
6. #15 - Rick Scribner -6
7. #58 - Wayne Jacks -6
8. #48 - Jack Sellers -7
9. #09 - Steve Kunz -15
10. #68 - Larry Gaylord -15
- Dirk Stephens led 119 laps and scored his second win of the season, shrinking Rick Carelli's points lead to 102.

=== Winston 200 (Cajon) ===
The Winston 200 was held on August 14 at Cajon Speedway. Rick Carelli won the pole.

Top Ten Results

1. #37 - Rick Carelli
2. #75 - Bill Sedgwick
3. #20 - Dirk Stephens
4. #12 - Bill McAnally -6
5. #18 - Bobby Goodwin Jr. -6
6. #86 - Rich Woodland Jr. -10
7. #44 - Chuck Welch -14
8. #77 - Jimmy Dick -29
9. #49 - Steve Sellers -61
10. #99 - Tom Taylor -63
- Rick Carelli took the lead from Bill Sedgwick, who had led 143 laps, with 31 laps remaining, leading the rest of the race to score his fifth and final win of the season. He extended his points lead to 112 over Dirk Stephens.

=== Winston 200 (Tri-City) ===
The Winston 200 was held on September 4 at Tri-City Raceway. Rick Carelli won the pole.

Top Ten Results

1. #20 - Dirk Stephens
2. #50 - Mike Chase
3. #75 - Bill Sedgwick
4. #95 - Lance Wade -2
5. #29 - John Krebs -2
6. #91 - Robert Sprague -2
7. #48 - Jack Sellers -9
8. #37 - Rick Carelli -11
9. #09 - Steve Kunz -15
10. #44 - Chuck Welch -16
- Although he led 81 laps, polesitter Rick Carelli ended up eleven laps down in eighth while championship rival Dirk Stephens led the most laps and scored the win, his third and final of the season and his career, closing the points gap to 74.

=== Meineke Discount Mufflers 300 ===
The Meineke Discount Mufflers 300 was held on October 17 at Mesa Marin Raceway. Gary Collins won the pole.

Top Ten Results

1. #75 - Bill Sedgwick
2. #20 - Dirk Stephens
3. #61 - Rick Carelli
4. #33 - Harry Gant
5. #12 - Jimmy Spencer
6. #16 - Rick Scribner -4
7. #91 - Robert Sprague -4
8. #95 - Lance Wade -4
9. #29 - John Krebs -5
10. #73 - Bill Schmitt -5
- Bill Sedgwick scored his second and final win of the season after dominating the event, leading for 284 of 300 laps. Rick Carelli's points lead was shrunk to 69 after finishing one spot behind Dirk Stephens.
- This was the final Winston West Series races for four-time series champion Bill Schmitt. With a tenth-place finish, he secured his 147th and final top-ten.

=== Slick 50 500 ===
The Slick 50 500 was held on October 31 at Phoenix International Raceway and was the second of two combination races with the NASCAR Winston Cup Series. Bill Elliott won the pole.

Top Ten Results

1. #6 - Mark Martin
2. #28 - Ernie Irvan
3. #42 - Kyle Petty
4. #3 - Dale Earnhardt
5. #11 - Bill Elliott
6. #5 - Ricky Rudd
7. #17 - Darrell Waltrip
8. #22 - Bobby Labonte
9. #30 - Michael Waltrip
10. #1 - Rick Mast

Failed to qualify: #36 - Butch Gilliland, #48 - Jack Sellers, #51 - Rick Scribner, #52 - Scott Gaylord, #81 - Jeff Davis

- Rusty Wallace suffered mechanical problems late in the race and finished nineteenth, allowing Dale Earnhardt to extended his Winston Cup points lead to 126 points ahead of Wallace going into Atlanta.
- Jimmy Hensley, who filled in for the #7 car, would drive the #4 car for this and the Winston Cup finale. Jimmy would crash on lap 73 but return to the track. The handling would deteriorate to the point where Jimmy parked the car after completing 242 laps of 312, ultimately finishing 32nd.
- This was the final Cup race Neil Bonnett called on TNN before his death at Daytona in February 1994.
- Rick Carelli finished 21st, first among Winston West drivers, while Dirk Stephens finished 42nd overall and last out of all West drivers who made the field, allowing Carelli to secure the title by 98 points.

== Full Drivers' Championship ==
(key) Bold – Pole position awarded by time. Italics – Pole position set by owner's points. * – Most laps led. † – Ineligible for West Series points

Pos	Driver	TWS	MMR	SGS	SON	TUS	SHA	EVG	POR	CBS	SSS	CAJ	TCR	MMR	PHO	Pts
1	Rick Carelli	8	4	**1***	21	9	**1***	1*	2*	**1***	4	**1**	**8**	3	21	2390
2	Dirk Stephens	6	10	2	30	1	5	**12**	4	2	1*	3	1*	2	42	2292
3	Bill Sedgwick		1*	3	26	15	2	4	**3**	4	**2**	2*	3	1*		2008
4	Wayne Jacks	39	14	6	DNQ	7	3	21	13	5	7	11	12	19	41	1888
5	Jack Sellers	42	15	10	DNQ	10	11	15	10	8	8	13	7	13	DNQ	1833
6	Rick Scribner		12		DNQ	4	8	6	15	6	6	12	11	6	DNQ	1676
7	Chuck Welch			13		5	12	14	9	10	11	7	10	16		1448
8	Butch Gilliland	43	3	8	32	**2**	7	10				16		18	DNQ	1416
9	Hershel McGriff	4	**2**	4	43	8	4	5	6							1269
10	Tony Hunt		11	12	DNQ	16	6	13	8			14		17		1151
11	Lance Wade		23			6		3	5		12		4	8		1119
12	Rich Woodland Jr.	11	13	11		12	9					6		11	38	1114
13	Bill Schmitt	16	8		31		14	11						10		847
14	Tom Taylor					14		25		12	13	10	18	21		803
15	John Krebs	22	9		34								5	9		732
16	Robert Sprague							24		3	3		6	7		717
17	Ron Hornaday Jr.		21	9		3*		19							22	694
18	Larry Gunselman							17	7	9	5		13			675
19	Bill McAnally		16				13			7		4		22		642
20	Larry Gaylord							16	12	11	10		17			618
21	Mike Chase		6										2	26	39	570
22	Ron Jacks			14		18	15	23						12		569
23	L. J. Pryor		25			11		20					16	20		539
24	Steve Kunz							22	11		9		9			503
25	Joe Heath		17	7									14	25		467
26	Bobby Goodwin Jr.		20			17						5				446
27	Jeff Davis	23			42										DNQ	430
28	Steve Sellers									13		9		15		380
29	Ken Schrader				4†			7	1						33†	331
30	Jason Fensler		7					8								288
31	Terry Fisher								14						37	286
32	Jimmy Dick											8		14		263
33	Scott Gaylord				DNQ										DNQ	251
34	Jim Courage		19				10									240
35	Troy Beebe	24	24													229
36	Gary Collins		22											**27**		179
37	Chad Little							2								175
38	Ron Esau	7														165
39	Harry Gant				19†									4	12†	160
40	Lance Hooper			5												155
41	Page Jones	**38**†	5													155
42	Jimmy Spencer				27†									5	27†	155
43	Mike Hurlbert							9								138
44	Paul Banghart					13										124
45	Ernie Cope												15			118
46	Buzz Woods											15				118
47	Gary Morris								16							115
48	Davey Allison				15†			18								109
49	Frank Adamo		18													102
50	Bob Lyon													23		94
51	Gary Bechtel													24		91
52	Terry Henry													28		79
	R. K. Smith				DNQ											

== See also ==
- 1993 NASCAR Winston Cup Series
- 1993 NASCAR Busch Series
