= 1992 NASCAR Winston West Series =

39th season of the NASCAR Winston West Series

The 1992 NASCAR Winston West Series was the 39th season of the series. The title was won by Bill Sedgwick, his second in the series and second in succession.

== Teams and drivers ==
=== Complete schedule ===
Manufacturer	Team	No.	Driver
Chevrolet	Chesrown Racing	37	Rick Carelli
Chevrolet	Ron Hornaday Jr.	92	Ron Hornaday Jr.
Chevrolet	Scribner Racing	15	Rick Scribner
Chevrolet	Spears Motorsports	75	Bill Sedgwick
Ford	Schmitt Racing	73	Bill Schmitt
Pontiac	Diamond Ridge Racing	29	John Krebs
Pontiac	Gilliland Racing	24	Butch Gilliland

=== Limited schedule ===
Manufacturer	Team	No.	Driver	Races
Buick	Adele Emerson	97	Roy Testa	1
Buick	Sara Vincent	41	Wayne Jacks	1
Buick	Sara Vincent	41	Chuck Welch	7
Buick	Sara Vincent	41	Jim Courage	1
Buick	St. James Racing	22	St. James Davis	7
Chevrolet	Bill Stroppe	38	Tobey Butler	1
Chevrolet	John Strauser	50	Hershel McGriff	6
Chevrolet	Kieper Racing	98	Jim Bown	3
Chevrolet	McCauley Racing	90	Tim McCauley	6
Chevrolet	McCray Racing	08	Rick McCray	2
Chevrolet	Scribner Racing	16	Pete Graham	1
Ford	Davey Allison	28	Davey Allison	1
Ford	Don Wade	95	Lance Wade	3
Ford	Jeff Davis Racing	44	Jeff Davis	1
Ford	Joe Heath	90	Joe Heath	1
Ford	Junior Johnson & Associates	11	Bill Elliott	3
Ford	Junior Johnson & Associates	22	Sterling Marlin	3
Ford	Little Racing	19	Chad Little	1
Ford	Red Eagle Racing	8	L. J. Pryor	2
Ford	Rouse Racing	91	Robert Sprague	3
Ford	Schmitt Racing	78	Dan Fisher	1
Ford	Schmitt Racing	78	Dick Rauser	1
Ford	Unknown	5	Mike Chase	2
Oldsmobile	Adele Emerson	34	Ted Kennedy	1
Oldsmobile	Collins Motorsports	28	Dirk Stephens	1
Oldsmobile	Collins Motorsports	28	Gary Collins	1 (Note: Collins was originally the driver for the May Mesa Marin race but due to an injury was replaced by Dirk Stephens.)
Oldsmobile	Puskarich Racing	00	Bryan Brown	1
Oldsmobile	Puskarich Racing	00	Larry Bashor	1
Pontiac	Adele Emerson	9	Steve Bare	1
Pontiac	Bill McAnally Racing	12	Bill McAnally	2
Pontiac	Bob Lipseia	04	Bobby Woods	3
Pontiac	Bob Walker Racing	88	Bob Walker	1
Pontiac	Diamond Ridge Racing	2	Jim Courage	1
Pontiac	Diamond Ridge Racing	2	Dirk Stephens	2
Pontiac	Diamond Ridge Racing	99	Steve Bare	3
Pontiac	Diamond Ridge Racing	99	Gary Scott	1
Pontiac	Diamond Ridge Racing	99	Jeff Davis (Note: Entry was fielded in collaboration with Sellers Racing)	1
Pontiac	FMR Motorsports	99	Steve Kunz	2
Pontiac	Gunselman Racing	60	Larry Gunselman	2
Pontiac	Jacks Racing	8	Ron Jacks	1
Pontiac	Jacks Racing	53	Ron Jacks	1
Pontiac	Jimmy Means Racing	52	Scott Gaylord	1
Pontiac	Kaylan Young Racing	60	Mike Chase	1
Pontiac	Larry Gaylord	68	Larry Gaylord	2
Pontiac	Midgley Racing	09	R. K. Smith	2
Pontiac	Midgley Racing	09	Roy Smith	1
Pontiac	Rick Mackey	36	Rick Mackey	1
Pontiac	Unknown	18	Bobby Goodwin Jr.	2
Pontiac	Unknown	57	Terry Fisher	1
Buick 8 Chevrolet 2	Adele Emerson	44	Jack Sellers	10
Pontiac 1 Buick 1	Adele Emerson	99	Steve Bare	1
Pontiac 1 Buick 1	Adele Emerson	99	Chuck Welch	1
Chevrolet 7 Oldsmobile 1	Woodland Racing	86	Rich Woodland Jr.	8
Pontiac 6 Oldsmobile 1	Jacks Racing	58	Wayne Jacks	7

== Schedule and results ==
The 1992 season included 11 individual races, although Mesa Marin Raceway hosted two races. The races at Sears Point International Raceway and Phoenix International Raceway were in combination with the NASCAR Winston Cup Series, and the race at Texas World Speedway was in combination with the ARCA SuperCar Series.

Date	Name	Racetrack	Location	Winner
May 17	Vons 300	Mesa Marin Raceway	Bakersfield, California	Rick Carelli
May 30	Alpha Beta 200	Saugus Speedway	Saugus, California	Rick Carelli
June 7	Save Mart 300K	Sears Point International Raceway	Sonoma, California	Ernie Irvan
June 13	Holiday Quality Foods 200	Shasta Speedway	Anderson, California	Bill Sedgwick
June 28	Astro 200 by Safeway/Diane's Foods	Portland Speedway	Portland, Oregon	Bill Sedgwick
July 12	Motorcraft Fast Lube 500	Evergreen Speedway	Monroe, Washington	Bill Sedgwick
August 1	Uhlmann Motors 200 by Pepsi	South Sound Speedway	Olympia, Washington	Rick Carelli
August 15	Thrifty Food & Gas/Winston 200	Cajon Speedway	Santee, California	Bill Schmitt
September 20	NASCAR/ARCA Texas World Speedway Shootout	Texas World Speedway	College Station, Texas	Mickey Gibbs
October 18	Winston October Classic	Mesa Marin Raceway	Bakersfield, California	Bill Sedgwick
November 1	Pyroil 500K	Phoenix International Raceway	Avondale, Arizona	Davey Allison

=== Vons 300 ===
The Vons 300 was held on May 17 at Mesa Marin Raceway. Gary Collins won the pole with a track record, although due to injury he was replaced by Dirk Stephens.

Top Ten Results

1. 37 - Rick Carelli
2. 75 - Bill Sedgwick
3. 73 - Bill Schmitt -5
4. 29 - John Krebs -6
5. 24 - Butch Gilliland -9
6. 00 - Bryan Brown -10
7. 15 - Rick Scribner -18
8. 86 - Rich Woodland Jr. -29
9. 44 - Jack Sellers -38
10. 28 - Dirk Stephens -43
- Rick Carelli would get the lead from Bill Sedgwick late in the race, leading the final of his 187 total laps led en route to his first win of the season and the first of his career.

=== Alpha Beta 200 ===
The Alpha Beta 200 was held on May 30 at Saugus Speedway. Ron Hornaday Jr. won the pole.

Top Ten Results

1. 37 - Rick Carelli
2. 24 - Butch Gilliland
3. 29 - John Krebs
4. 73 - Bill Schmitt -1
5. 92 - Ron Hornaday Jr. -4
6. 15 - Rick Scribner -4
7. 75 - Bill Sedgwick -4
8. 44 - Jack Sellers -13
9. 22 - St. James Davis -20
10. 41 - Chuck Welch -78
- For the second race in a row, Rick Carelli would lead the most laps and win the event, beating Butch Gilliland by over eight seconds. He headed into Sears Point with a 35 point advantage over Bill Schmitt and Gilliland.

=== Save Mart 300K ===
The Save Mart 300K was held on June 7 at Sears Point International Raceway and was the first of two combination races with the NASCAR Winston Cup Series. Ricky Rudd won the pole.

Top Ten Results

1. 4 - Ernie Irvan
2. 94 - Terry Labonte
3. 6 - Mark Martin
4. 5 - Ricky Rudd
5. 11 - Bill Elliott
6. 3 - Dale Earnhardt
7. 2 - Rusty Wallace
8. 17 - Darrell Waltrip
9. 25 - Ken Schrader
10. 15 - Geoff Bodine

Failed to qualify: 58 - Wayne Jacks, 04 - Bobby Woods

- On the day of this race, NASCAR founder Bill France Sr. died.
- Ernie Irvan started second in this race, but jumped the start and was given a stop-and-go penalty in the pits. Irvan came through the entire field to win in the fastest Winston Cup race held on the 2.52-mile (4.06 km) version of Sears Point. Irvan forged one of the most astonishing comebacks in NASCAR history. Irvan, qualifying second, was black-flagged for jumping the start of the race, relegating him to dead last on a road course with road course demons Rusty Wallace, Ricky Rudd and Terry Labonte leading the field. Irvan blazed through the backmarkers, picked off the middle of the pack, then steadily reeled in leader Labonte with 10 laps remaining. Finally, on lap 67 of the 74-lap event, Irvan retook the top spot and drove on to a 3.6-second win. Irvan dedicated the race to Bill France Sr., the founder of NASCAR who died the morning of the race.
- Richard Petty's 21st-place finish made him the last car on the lead lap, the final race where he would finish on the lead lap.
- Bill Sedgwick was the highest finishing West Series driver, coming home nineteenth overall and scoring points equivalent to a win. Rick Carelli finished seventh among West drivers, falling out of the race after 57 laps and finishing 37th overall. However, he would maintain the points lead by seven points over Bill Schmitt and eleven points over Sedgwick.

=== Holiday Quality Foods 200 ===
The Holiday Quality Foods 200 was held on June 13 at Shasta Speedway. Jim Bown won the pole.

Top Ten Results

1. 75 - Bill Sedgwick
2. 92 - Ron Hornaday Jr.
3. 73 - Bill Schmitt
4. 37 - Rick Carelli
5. 24 - Butch Gilliland -1
6. 91 - Robert Sprague -2
7. 29 - John Krebs -6
8. 86 - Rich Woodland Jr. -8
9. 15 - Rick Scribner -9
10. 22 - St. James Davis -21
- Bill Sedgwick, who only led sixteen of the race's 200 laps, would score his first win of the season, beating Ron Hornaday Jr. by 1.6 seconds.
- Rick Carelli, who finished fourth, maintained the points lead by just one point over Sedgwick.

=== Astro 200 by Safeway/Diane's Foods ===
The Astro 200 by Safeway/Diane's Foods was held on June 28 at Portland Speedway. Hershel McGriff won the pole.

Top Ten Results

1. 75 - Bill Sedgwick
2. 73 - Bill Schmitt
3. 57 - Terry Fisher -1
4. 95 - Lance Wade -1
5. 15 - Rick Scribner -1
6. 92 - Ron Hornaday Jr. -2
7. 50 - Hershel McGriff -3
8. 29 - John Krebs -4
9. 60 - Larry Gunselman -4
10. 37 - Rick Carelli -6
- In a close finish, Bill Sedgwick scored his second straight win, beating Bill Schmitt by just 0.25 seconds. Sedgwick would move into the points lead, eleven points ahead of Schmitt, while Rick Carelli dropped to third, 40 points back.

=== Motorcraft Fast Lube 500 ===
The Motorcraft Fast Lube 500 was held on July 12 at Evergreen Speedway. Chad Little won the pole.

Top Ten Results

1. 75 - Bill Sedgwick
2. 22 - Sterling Marlin
3. 19 - Chad Little
4. 37 - Rick Carelli -1
5. 29 - John Krebs -2
6. 24 - Butch Gilliland -4
7. 73 - Bill Schmitt -5
8. 11 - Bill Elliott -6
9. 09 - Roy Smith -8
10. 91 - Robert Sprague -10
- For the third race in a row, Bill Sedgwick would score the win, beating Winston Cup driver Sterling Marlin by two seconds. Sedgwick expanded his points lead over Schmitt to 40.

=== Uhlmann Motors 200 by Pepsi ===
The Ulhmann Motors 200 by Pepsi was held on August 1 at South Sound Speedway. Ron Hornaday Jr. won the pole.

Top Ten Results

1. 37 - Rick Carelli
2. 92 - Ron Hornaday Jr.
3. 50 - Hershel McGriff
4. 24 - Butch Gilliland
5. 73 - Bill Schmitt -1
6. 2 - Dirk Stephens -2
7. 15 - Rick Scribner -13
8. 44 - Jack Sellers -14
9. 41 - Chuck Welch -18
10. 29 - John Krebs -49
- Ron Hornaday Jr. started on pole and led over half of the laps, but in the end would finish second to Rick Carelli, who won by 6.5 seconds to score his third and final win of the season. Bill Sedgwick would maintain the points lead, seven points over both Bill Schmitt and Carelli.

=== Thrifty Food & Gas/Winston 200 ===
The Thrifty Food & Gas/Winston 200 was held on August 15 at Cajon Speedway. Ron Hornaday Jr. won the pole.

Top Ten Results

1. 73 - Bill Schmitt
2. 75 - Bill Sedgwick
3. 92 - Ron Hornaday Jr. -1
4. 24 - Butch Gilliland -2
5. 29 - John Krebs -5
6. 58 - Wayne Jacks -8
7. 86 - Rich Woodland Jr. -9
8. 00 - Larry Bashor -13
9. 99 - Jeff Davis -13
10. 41 - Chuck Welch -20
- Bill Schmitt dominated the race, leading 181 of 200 laps and scoring his lone win of the season. Schmitt took the points lead from Bill Sedgwick, who stayed within three points of Schmitt.

=== NASCAR/ARCA Texas World Speedway Shootout ===
The NASCAR/ARCA Texas World Speedway Shootout was held on September 20 at Texas World Speedway, and was in combination with the ARCA SuperCar Series, the first time the two series raced together. Loy Allen Jr. won the pole.

Top Ten Results

1. 50 - Mickey Gibbs
2. 16 - Roy Payne
3. 2 - Loy Allen Jr.
4. 9 - John Krebs
5. 65 - Jerry O'Neil
6. 37 - Rick Carelli
7. 92 - Ron Hornaday Jr. -1
8. 73 - Bill Schmitt -2
9. 24 - Butch Gilliland -2
10. 64 - Gary Wright -5

Failed to qualify: Billy Bigley Jr., Kim Campbell, Wayne Dellinger, Ron Esau, Robert Ham, Harry Page, David Starr, Mark Starr, Ian Thomas, Gary Tootle, Clay Young, 09 - R. K. Smith, 41 - Chuck Welch, 86 - Rich Woodland Jr., 99 - Steve Bare

- In the first ARCA-NASCAR combination race to be held, Mickey Gibbs would score his third and final ARCA SuperCar Series win, while John Krebs was the highest finishing West Series driver, finishing fourth.
- Points leader Bill Sedgwick would fall out of the race after just four laps with engine issues, finishing tenth among West drivers and 43rd overall. Bill Schmitt, however, was fourth among West drivers, good enough for eighth overall, and took the points lead from Sedgwick by 29 points.

=== Winston October Classic ===
The Winston October Classic was held on October 18 at Mesa Marin Raceway. Ron Hornaday Jr. won the pole.

Top Ten Results

1. 75 - Bill Sedgwick
2. 37 - Rick Carelli
3. 29 - John Krebs
4. 92 - Ron Hornaday Jr.
5. 73 - Bill Schmitt -1
6. 95 - Lance Wade -1
7. 5 - Mike Chase -2
8. 50 - Hershel McGriff -3
9. 34 - Ted Kennedy -6
10. 58 - Wayne Jacks -8
- Bill Sedgwick would lead 159 of the race's 300 laps, and would beat Rick Carelli by 5.6 seconds to score his fourth and final win of the season. Winning the race while Bill Schmitt finished fifth, Sedgwick cut the points deficit to four heading into the final race.

=== Pyroil 500K ===
The Pyroil 500K was held on November 1 at Phoenix International Raceway and was the second of two combination races with the NASCAR Winston Cup Series. Rusty Wallace won the pole.

Top Ten Results

1. 28 - Davey Allison
2. 6 - Mark Martin
3. 17 - Darrell Waltrip
4. 7 - Alan Kulwicki
5. 12 - Jimmy Spencer
6. 25 - Ken Schrader
7. 10 - Derrike Cope
8. 68 - Bobby Hamilton
9. 22 - Sterling Marlin -1
10. 3 - Dale Earnhardt -1

Failed to qualify: 86 - Rich Woodland Jr., 58 - Wayne Jacks

- Smoke billowed from Bill Elliott's Budweiser Ford, signaling an opportunity for the rest of the Winston Cup contenders. Davey Allison and Alan Kulwicki took full advantage. While Elliott's car suffered from a cracked cylinder head and overheating problems, which relegated him to a 31st-place finish, Allison patiently made his way to the front and won his second consecutive Pyroil 500. The emotional victory — Allison's first since an accident at Pocono (and penultimate), vaulted him back into the Winston Cup points lead. Kulwicki ran strong all day and finished fourth, also moving him past Elliott in the point standings. Heading into the final event of the Winston Cup season at Atlanta Motor Speedway, Allison led Kulwicki by 30 points, Elliott by 40, Gant by 97, Petty by 98 and Martin by 113. It was the first time in the sport's history that six drivers were still in contention heading into the final event.
- To mark Richard Petty's penultimate race, both of the cars sponsored by Skoal tobacco, Harry Gant's #33 Skoal Bandit Oldsmobile and Rick Mast's #1 Skoal Classic Oldsmobile sported "Thanks King Richard" messages on their quarterpanels and decklid.
- The race was Whitcomb Racing's final top-ten finish, as the team would fold after the season ended.
- For the second time in the season, John Krebs was the highest finishing West driver in a combination race, finishing 23rd overall. Bill Sedgwick, who scored ten more points in the race than Bill Schmitt, would win the West Series title by six points.

== Full Drivers' Championship ==
(key) Bold – Pole position awarded by time. Italics – Pole position set by owner's points. * – Most laps led. † – Ineligible for West Series points

Pos	Driver	MMR	SGS	SON	SHA	POR	EVG	SSS	CAJ	TWS	MMR	PHO	Pts
1	Bill Sedgwick	2	7	19	1	1	1	12	2	43	1*	27	1817
2	Bill Schmitt	3	4	24	3	2*	7	5	1*	8	5	33	1811
3	Rick Carelli	1*	1*	37	4*	10	4	1	14	6	2	42	1765
4	John Krebs	4	3	31	7	8	5	10	5	4	3	23	1742
5	Ron Hornaday Jr.	11	**5**	32	2	6	22	**2***	**3**	7	**4**	25	1722
6	Butch Gilliland	5	2	38	5	16	6	4	4	9	12	29	1660
7	Rick Scribner	7	6	36	9	5	12	7	11	17	24	41	1517
8	Jack Sellers	9	8	40	14	12	11	8	13	33	23		1290
9	Chuck Welch		10		12	13	13	9	10	DNQ	14		1141
10	Rich Woodland Jr.	8	14		8	18			7	DNQ	11	DNQ	1047
11	Wayne Jacks	16	15	DNQ			19		6	19	10	DNQ	1026
12	St. James Davis	13	9		10	14	23		15		26		935
13	Hershel McGriff	15		42		**7**	24	3			8		802
14	Tim McCauley	12	11				25	11	16		25		678
15	Steve Bare	14	12		13					DNQ	28		575
16	Lance Wade					4	16				6		425
17	Robert Sprague				6	11	10						419
18	Mike Chase			35			14				7		417
19	Dirk Stephens	10					15	6					402
20	Bobby Woods			DNQ			26			13			359
21	Jim Bown				**11**	15	21						358
22	L.J. Pryor							13			17		306
23	Jeff Davis								9			26	303
24	R. K. Smith			33						DNQ			285
25	Larry Gunselman					9	18						247
26	Steve Kunz						17	14					233
27	Jim Courage	17									15		230
28	Bobby Goodwin Jr.								12		22		224
29	Bill McAnally				15						19		224
30	Rick McCray		13								27		206
31	Ron Jacks						28		17				191
32	Larry Gaylord					19	29						182
33	Sterling Marlin			16†			2*					9†	180
34	Chad Little						**3**						170
35	Terry Fisher					3							165
36	Bryan Brown	6											150
37	Scott Gaylord											37	146
38	Ted Kennedy										9		143
39	Bill Elliott			5†			8					31†	142
40	Larry Bashor								8				142
41	Roy Smith						9						138
42	Gary Collins	**INQ****									13		124
43	Dick Rauser							15					118
44	Roy Testa										16		115
45	Gary Scott					17							112
46	Joe Heath										18		109
47	Dan Fisher	18											109
48	Davey Allison			28†							20	1†	108
49	Rick Mackey						20						103
50	Bob Walker										21		100
51	Pete Graham						27						82
52	Tobey Butler						30						73

**Qualified but replaced by Dirk Stephens

== See also ==
- 1992 NASCAR Winston Cup Series
- 1992 NASCAR Busch Series
