= 1993 Slick 50 500 =

29th race of the 1993 NASCAR Winston Cup Series

Race details
- Race 29 of 30 in the 1993 NASCAR Winston Cup Series
- The 1993 Slick 50 500 program cover.
- Date: October 31, 1993
- Official name: 6th Annual Slick 50 500
- Location: Avondale, Arizona, Phoenix International Raceway
- Course: Permanent racing facility
- Course length: 1 miles (1.6 km)
- Distance: 312 laps, 312 mi (502.115 km)
- Scheduled distance: 312 laps, 312 mi (502.115 km)
- Average speed: 100.375 miles per hour (161.538 km/h)

Pole position
Driver	Bill Elliott	Junior Johnson & Associates
- Time: 27.803

Most laps led
Driver	Mark Martin	Roush Racing
- Laps: 212

Winner
No. 6	Mark Martin	Roush Racing

Television in the United States
- Network: TNN
- Announcers: Mike Joy, Buddy Baker, Neil Bonnett

Radio in the United States
- Radio: Motor Racing Network

The 1993 Slick 50 500 was the 29th and penultimate stock car race of the 1993 NASCAR Winston Cup Series season, the 14th and final race of the 1993 NASCAR Winston West Series season, and the sixth iteration of the event. The race was held on Sunday, October 31, 1993, in Avondale, Arizona at Phoenix International Raceway, a 1-mile (1.6 km) permanent low-banked tri-oval race track. The race took the scheduled 312 laps to complete. At race's end, Roush Racing driver Mark Martin would manage to dominate a majority of the race to take his 12th career NASCAR Winston Cup Series victory and his fifth and final victory of the season. To fill out the top three, Robert Yates Racing driver Ernie Irvan and SABCO Racing driver Kyle Petty would finish second and third, respectively.

Heading into the final race of the season, the 1993 Hooters 500, Richard Childress Racing driver Dale Earnhardt was the heavy favorite to win the championship, only needing a 34th place or better to win the driver's championship.

== Background ==
The layout of Phoenix International Raceway, the venue where the race was held.

Phoenix International Raceway is a one-mile, low-banked tri-oval race track located in Avondale, Arizona. It is named after the nearby metropolitan area of Phoenix. The motorsport track opened in 1964 and currently hosts two NASCAR race weekends annually. PIR has also hosted the IndyCar Series, CART, USAC and the Rolex Sports Car Series. The raceway is currently owned and operated by International Speedway Corporation.

The raceway was originally constructed with a 2.5 mi (4.0 km) road course that ran both inside and outside of the main tri-oval. In 1991 the track was reconfigured with the current 1.51 mi (2.43 km) interior layout. PIR has an estimated grandstand seating capacity of around 67,000. Lights were installed around the track in 2004 following the addition of a second annual NASCAR race weekend.

=== Entry list ===
- (R) denotes rookie driver.

#	Driver	Team	Make
1	Rick Mast	Precision Products Racing	Ford
2	Rusty Wallace	Penske Racing South	Pontiac
3	Dale Earnhardt	Richard Childress Racing	Chevrolet
4	Jimmy Hensley	Morgan–McClure Motorsports	Chevrolet
5	Ricky Rudd	Hendrick Motorsports	Chevrolet
6	Mark Martin	Roush Racing	Ford
7	Geoff Bodine	Geoff Bodine Racing	Ford
8	Sterling Marlin	Stavola Brothers Racing	Ford
11	Bill Elliott	Junior Johnson & Associates	Ford
12	Jimmy Spencer	Bobby Allison Motorsports	Ford
13	Stan Fox	Folsom Racing	Chevrolet
14	Terry Labonte	Hagan Racing	Chevrolet
15	Lake Speed	Bud Moore Engineering	Ford
16	Wally Dallenbach Jr.	Roush Racing	Ford
17	Darrell Waltrip	Darrell Waltrip Motorsports	Chevrolet
18	Dale Jarrett	Joe Gibbs Racing	Chevrolet
20	Dirk Stephens	Craigen Racing	Ford
21	Morgan Shepherd	Wood Brothers Racing	Ford
22	Bobby Labonte (R)	Bill Davis Racing	Ford
24	Jeff Gordon (R)	Hendrick Motorsports	Chevrolet
25	Ken Schrader	Hendrick Motorsports	Chevrolet
26	Brett Bodine	King Racing	Ford
27	Hut Stricklin	Junior Johnson & Associates	Ford
28	Ernie Irvan	Robert Yates Racing	Ford
29	Steve Grissom	Diamond Ridge Motorsports	Chevrolet
30	Michael Waltrip	Bahari Racing	Pontiac
33	Harry Gant	Leo Jackson Motorsports	Chevrolet
36	Butch Gilliland	Gilliland Racing	Chevrolet
39	Chuck Bown	Roulo Brothers Racing	Chevrolet
40	Kenny Wallace (R)	SABCO Racing	Pontiac
41	Dick Trickle	Larry Hedrick Motorsports	Chevrolet
42	Kyle Petty	SABCO Racing	Pontiac
44	Rick Wilson	Petty Enterprises	Pontiac
48	Jack Sellers	Sellers Racing	Chevrolet
50	Mike Chase	JTC Racing	Chevrolet
51	Rick Scribner	Scribner Racing	Chevrolet
52	Scott Gaylord	Jimmy Means Racing	Ford
55	Ted Musgrave	RaDiUs Motorsports	Ford
58	Wayne Jacks	Jacks Motorsports	Pontiac
61	Rick Carelli	Chesrown Racing	Chevrolet
68	Loy Allen Jr.	TriStar Motorsports	Ford
71	Terry Fisher	Marcis Auto Racing	Pontiac
72	John Andretti	Tex Racing	Chevrolet
75	Todd Bodine (R)	Butch Mock Motorsports	Ford
76	Ron Hornaday Jr.	Spears Motorsports	Chevrolet
81	Jeff Davis	Jeff Davis Racing	Ford
86	Rich Woodland Jr.	Woodland Racing	Oldsmobile
90	Bobby Hillin Jr.	Donlavey Racing	Ford
98	Derrike Cope	Cale Yarborough Motorsports	Ford

== Qualifying ==
Qualifying was split into two rounds. The first round was held on Friday, October 29, at 6:00 PM EST. Each driver would have one lap to set a time. During the first round, the top 20 drivers in the round would be guaranteed a starting spot in the race. If a driver was not able to guarantee a spot in the first round, they had the option to scrub their time from the first round and try and run a faster lap time in a second round qualifying run, held on Saturday, October 30, at 3:00 PM EST. As with the first round, each driver would have one lap to set a time. For this specific race, positions 21-40 would be decided on time, and depending on who needed it, a select amount of positions were given to cars who had not otherwise qualified but were high enough in owner's points; which was one for cars in the NASCAR Winston Cup Series and two extra provisionals for the NASCAR Winston West Series. If needed, a past champion who did not qualify on either time or provisionals could use a champion's provisional, adding one more spot to the field.

Bill Elliott, driving for Junior Johnson & Associates, won the pole, setting a time of 27.803 and an average speed of 129.482 mph (208.381 km/h) in the first round.

Six drivers would fail to qualify.

=== Full qualifying results ===
Pos.	#	Driver	Team	Make	Time	Speed
1	11	Bill Elliott	Junior Johnson & Associates	Ford	27.803	129.482
2	41	Dick Trickle	Larry Hedrick Motorsports	Chevrolet	27.827	129.371
3	6	Mark Martin	Roush Racing	Ford	27.877	129.139
4	5	Ricky Rudd	Hendrick Motorsports	Chevrolet	27.877	129.139
5	28	Ernie Irvan	Robert Yates Racing	Ford	27.894	129.060
6	2	Rusty Wallace	Penske Racing South	Pontiac	27.899	129.037
7	8	Sterling Marlin	Stavola Brothers Racing	Ford	27.901	129.028
8	25	Ken Schrader	Hendrick Motorsports	Chevrolet	27.957	128.769
9	24	Jeff Gordon (R)	Hendrick Motorsports	Chevrolet	27.968	128.719
10	39	Chuck Bown	Roulo Brothers Racing	Chevrolet	27.977	128.677
11	3	Dale Earnhardt	Richard Childress Racing	Chevrolet	27.998	128.581
12	26	Brett Bodine	King Racing	Ford	28.001	128.567
13	1	Rick Mast	Precision Products Racing	Ford	28.068	128.260
14	18	Dale Jarrett	Joe Gibbs Racing	Chevrolet	28.073	128.237
15	33	Harry Gant	Leo Jackson Motorsports	Chevrolet	28.097	128.128
16	15	Lake Speed	Bud Moore Engineering	Ford	28.098	128.123
17	12	Jimmy Spencer	Bobby Allison Motorsports	Ford	28.099	128.118
18	29	Steve Grissom	Diamond Ridge Motorsports	Chevrolet	28.136	127.950
19	7	Geoff Bodine	Geoff Bodine Racing	Ford	28.139	127.936
20	22	Bobby Labonte (R)	Bill Davis Racing	Ford	28.157	127.855
Failed to lock in Round 1
21	17	Darrell Waltrip	Darrell Waltrip Motorsports	Chevrolet	28.057	128.310
22	21	Morgan Shepherd	Wood Brothers Racing	Ford	28.176	127.768
23	30	Michael Waltrip	Bahari Racing	Pontiac	28.214	127.596
24	76	Ron Hornaday Jr.	Spears Motorsports	Chevrolet	28.215	127.592
25	61	Rick Carelli	Chesrown Racing	Chevrolet	28.238	127.488
26	14	Terry Labonte	Hagan Racing	Chevrolet	28.252	127.425
27	42	Kyle Petty	SABCO Racing	Pontiac	28.261	127.384
28	27	Hut Stricklin	Junior Johnson & Associates	Ford	28.261	127.384
29	4	Jimmy Hensley	Morgan–McClure Motorsports	Chevrolet	28.269	127.348
30	75	Todd Bodine (R)	Butch Mock Motorsports	Ford	28.277	127.312
31	98	Derrike Cope	Cale Yarborough Motorsports	Ford	28.294	127.235
32	40	Kenny Wallace (R)	SABCO Racing	Pontiac	28.318	127.128
33	16	Wally Dallenbach Jr.	Roush Racing	Ford	28.357	126.953
34	72	John Andretti	Tex Racing	Chevrolet	28.357	126.953
35	90	Bobby Hillin Jr.	Donlavey Racing	Ford	28.390	126.805
36	55	Ted Musgrave	RaDiUs Motorsports	Ford	28.400	126.761
37	44	Rick Wilson	Petty Enterprises	Pontiac	28.426	126.645
38	50	Mike Chase	JTC Racing	Chevrolet	28.481	126.400
39	86	Rich Woodland Jr.	Woodland Racing	Oldsmobile	28.759	125.178
40	68	Loy Allen Jr.	TriStar Motorsports	Ford	28.836	124.844
Winston Cup provisional
41	71	Terry Fisher	Marcis Auto Racing	Pontiac	-*	-*
Winston West provisionals
42	20	Dirk Stephens	Craigen Racing	Ford	-*	-*
43	58	Wayne Jacks	Jacks Motorsports	Pontiac	-*	-*
Failed to qualify
44	52	Scott Gaylord	Jimmy Means Racing	Ford	-*	-*
45	36	Butch Gilliland	Gilliland Racing	Chevrolet	-*	-*
46	13	Stan Fox	Folsom Racing	Chevrolet	-*	-*
47	48	Jack Sellers	Sellers Racing	Chevrolet	-*	-*
48	81	Jeff Davis	Jeff Davis Racing	Ford	-*	-*
49	51	Rick Scribner	Scribner Racing	Chevrolet	-*	-*
Official first round qualifying results
Official starting lineup

== Race results ==
Fin	St	#	Driver	Team	Make	Laps	Led	Status	Pts	Winnings
1	3	6	Mark Martin	Roush Racing	Ford	312	212	running	185	$67,035
2	5	28	Ernie Irvan	Robert Yates Racing	Ford	312	6	running	175	$44,155
3	27	42	Kyle Petty	SABCO Racing	Pontiac	312	9	running	170	$28,430
4	11	3	Dale Earnhardt	Richard Childress Racing	Chevrolet	312	2	running	165	$29,980
5	1	11	Bill Elliott	Junior Johnson & Associates	Ford	312	1	running	160	$31,655
6	4	5	Ricky Rudd	Hendrick Motorsports	Chevrolet	312	0	running	150	$21,120
7	21	17	Darrell Waltrip	Darrell Waltrip Motorsports	Chevrolet	312	0	running	146	$21,820
8	20	22	Bobby Labonte (R)	Bill Davis Racing	Ford	312	2	running	147	$14,620
9	23	30	Michael Waltrip	Bahari Racing	Pontiac	312	2	running	143	$16,020
10	13	1	Rick Mast	Precision Products Racing	Ford	312	6	running	139	$17,770
11	22	21	Morgan Shepherd	Wood Brothers Racing	Ford	312	0	running	130	$14,820
12	15	33	Harry Gant	Leo Jackson Motorsports	Chevrolet	311	16	running	132	$17,520
13	16	15	Lake Speed	Bud Moore Engineering	Ford	311	0	running	124	$16,220
14	26	14	Terry Labonte	Hagan Racing	Chevrolet	311	0	running	121	$13,720
15	36	55	Ted Musgrave	RaDiUs Motorsports	Ford	311	0	running	118	$13,420
16	14	18	Dale Jarrett	Joe Gibbs Racing	Chevrolet	311	0	running	115	$15,320
17	32	40	Kenny Wallace (R)	SABCO Racing	Pontiac	310	0	running	112	$9,920
18	35	90	Bobby Hillin Jr.	Donlavey Racing	Ford	310	0	running	109	$7,095
19	6	2	Rusty Wallace	Penske Racing South	Pontiac	310	1	running	111	$15,495
20	37	44	Rick Wilson	Petty Enterprises	Pontiac	309	0	running	103	$9,260
21	25	61	Rick Carelli	Chesrown Racing	Chevrolet	309	0	running	100	$6,685
22	24	76	Ron Hornaday Jr.	Spears Motorsports	Chevrolet	307	0	running	97	$6,660
23	31	98	Derrike Cope	Cale Yarborough Motorsports	Ford	306	0	running	94	$11,535
24	10	39	Chuck Bown	Roulo Brothers Racing	Chevrolet	306	0	running	91	$6,610
25	30	75	Todd Bodine (R)	Butch Mock Motorsports	Ford	305	0	running	88	$6,585
26	40	68	Loy Allen Jr.	TriStar Motorsports	Ford	305	0	running	85	$6,560
27	17	12	Jimmy Spencer	Bobby Allison Motorsports	Ford	305	0	running	82	$11,385
28	12	26	Brett Bodine	King Racing	Ford	300	0	running	79	$11,260
29	18	29	Steve Grissom	Diamond Ridge Motorsports	Chevrolet	260	0	running	76	$6,485
30	7	8	Sterling Marlin	Stavola Brothers Racing	Ford	255	4	crash	78	$11,110
31	2	41	Dick Trickle	Larry Hedrick Motorsports	Chevrolet	254	3	trail arm	75	$9,535
32	29	4	Jimmy Hensley	Morgan–McClure Motorsports	Chevrolet	242	0	handling	67	$15,760
33	8	25	Ken Schrader	Hendrick Motorsports	Chevrolet	236	0	running	64	$10,710
34	33	16	Wally Dallenbach Jr.	Roush Racing	Ford	234	0	rear end	61	$10,660
35	9	24	Jeff Gordon (R)	Hendrick Motorsports	Chevrolet	195	48	handling	63	$7,610
36	28	27	Hut Stricklin	Junior Johnson & Associates	Ford	157	0	handling	55	$10,560
37	41	71	Terry Fisher	Marcis Auto Racing	Pontiac	132	0	engine	52	$6,040
38	39	86	Rich Woodland Jr.	Woodland Racing	Oldsmobile	114	0	engine	49	$6,030
39	38	50	Mike Chase	JTC Racing	Chevrolet	87	0	engine	46	$6,015
40	34	72	John Andretti	Tex Racing	Chevrolet	49	0	crash	43	$5,980
41	43	58	Wayne Jacks	Jacks Motorsports	Pontiac	48	0	engine	40	$5,980
42	42	20	Dirk Stephens	Craigen Racing	Ford	24	0	engine	37	$5,980
43	19	7	Geoff Bodine	Geoff Bodine Racing	Ford	14	0	crash	34	$15,380
Official race results

== Standings after the race ==
Drivers' Championship standings

	Pos	Driver	Points
	1	Dale Earnhardt	4,387
	2	Rusty Wallace	4,261 (-126)
	3	Mark Martin	4,047 (-340)
	4	Dale Jarrett	3,849 (–538)
	5	Morgan Shepherd	3,735 (–652)
1	6	Kyle Petty	3,730 (–657)
1	7	Ernie Irvan	3,707 (–680)
2	8	Ken Schrader	3,633 (–754)
	9	Bill Elliott	3,609 (–778)
	10	Ricky Rudd	3,469 (–918)
Official driver's standings

- Note: Only the first 10 positions are included for the driver standings.

Previous race: 1993 AC Delco 500	NASCAR Winston Cup Series; 1993 season	Next race: 1993 Hooters 500

Previous race: 1993 Meineke Discount Mufflers 300	NASCAR Winston West Series; 1993 season	Next race: 1994 California 200
