= 1992 Pyroil 500K =

28th race of the 1992 NASCAR Winston Cup Series

Race details
- Race 28 of 29 in the 1992 NASCAR Winston Cup Series
- The 1992 Pyroil 500K program cover, featuring Mark Martin.
- Date: November 1, 1992
- Official name: 5th Annual Pyroil 500K
- Location: Avondale, Arizona, Phoenix International Raceway
- Course: Permanent racing facility
- Course length: 1 miles (1.6 km)
- Distance: 312 laps, 312 mi (502.115 km)
- Scheduled distance: 312 laps, 312 mi (502.115 km)
- Average speed: 103.885 miles per hour (167.187 km/h)
- Attendance: 80,000

Pole position
| Driver | Rusty Wallace | Penske Racing South |
- Time: 28.094

Most laps led
| Driver | Rusty Wallace | Penske Racing South |
- Laps: 161

Winner
| No. 28 | Davey Allison | Robert Yates Racing |

Television in the United States
- Network: TNN
- Announcers: Mike Joy, Buddy Baker, Neil Bonnett

Radio in the United States
- Radio: Motor Racing Network

The 1992 Pyroil 500K was the 28th and penultimate stock car race of the 1992 NASCAR Winston Cup Series season, the 11th and final race of the 1992 NASCAR Winston West Series, and the fifth iteration of the event. The race was held on Sunday, November 1, 1992, before an audience of 80,000 in Avondale, Arizona at Phoenix International Raceway, a 1-mile (1.6 km) permanent low-banked tri-oval race track. The race took the scheduled 312 laps to complete. At race's end, Robert Yates Racing driver Davey Allison would manage to make a late-race charge late in the race, passing for the lead with 30 to go to retake the driver's championship points lead, assisted from a poor finish by the points leader heading into the race, Bill Elliott. The victory was Allison's 18th career NASCAR Winston Cup Series victory and his fifth and final victory of the season. To fill out the top three, Roush Racing driver Mark Martin and owner-driver Darrell Waltrip would finish second and third, respectively.

In the driver's championship for the 1992 NASCAR Winston Cup Series, heading into the final race of the season, the 1992 Hooters 500, six drivers were eligible to win the driver's championship, culminating into one of the closest championship battles in NASCAR Winston Cup Series history. Driver's championship leader Davey Allison would lead second-place driver Alan Kulwicki by 30 points and third-place driver Bill Elliott by 40 points. For Allison to clinch the championship, Allison would need to finish fifth or better at the Hooters 500. Second-place Kulwicki would need to win the race, lead the most laps, and for Allison to finish outside the top five to clinch the championship. Third-place Bill Elliott would need to win the race, lead the most laps, and for Allison to finish outside the top eight to win the championship. Additionally, three other drivers, considered long-shots to win the title, were also eligible to win the championship: Harry Gant, Kyle Petty, and Mark Martin.

In the driver's championship for the 1992 NASCAR Winston West Series, Spears Motorsports driver Bill Sedgwick, assisted by a poor finish by competitor Bill Schmitt, would manage to win the Winston West title by six points over Schmitt.

== Background ==
The layout of Phoenix International Raceway, the venue where the race was held.

Phoenix International Raceway – also known as PIR – is a one-mile, low-banked tri-oval race track located in Avondale, Arizona. It is named after the nearby metropolitan area of Phoenix. The motorsport track opened in 1964 and currently hosts two NASCAR race weekends annually. PIR has also hosted the IndyCar Series, CART, USAC and the Rolex Sports Car Series. The raceway is currently owned and operated by International Speedway Corporation.

The raceway was originally constructed with a 2.5 mi (4.0 km) road course that ran both inside and outside of the main tri-oval. In 1991 the track was reconfigured with the current 1.51 mi (2.43 km) interior layout. PIR has an estimated grandstand seating capacity of around 67,000. Lights were installed around the track in 2004 following the addition of a second annual NASCAR race weekend.

=== Entry list ===
- (R) denotes rookie driver.

| # | Driver | Team | Make |
|---|---|---|---|
| 1 | Rick Mast | Precision Products Racing | Oldsmobile |
| 2 | Rusty Wallace | Penske Racing South | Pontiac |
| 3 | Dale Earnhardt | Richard Childress Racing | Chevrolet |
| 4 | Ernie Irvan | Morgan–McClure Motorsports | Chevrolet |
| 5 | Ricky Rudd | Hendrick Motorsports | Chevrolet |
| 6 | Mark Martin | Roush Racing | Ford |
| 7 | Alan Kulwicki | AK Racing | Ford |
| 8 | Dick Trickle | Stavola Brothers Racing | Ford |
| 10 | Derrike Cope | Whitcomb Racing | Chevrolet |
| 11 | Bill Elliott | Junior Johnson & Associates | Ford |
| 12 | Jimmy Spencer | Bobby Allison Motorsports | Chevrolet |
| 15 | Geoff Bodine | Bud Moore Engineering | Ford |
| 16 | Wally Dallenbach Jr. | Roush Racing | Ford |
| 17 | Darrell Waltrip | Darrell Waltrip Motorsports | Chevrolet |
| 18 | Dale Jarrett | Joe Gibbs Racing | Chevrolet |
| 21 | Morgan Shepherd | Wood Brothers Racing | Ford |
| 22 | Sterling Marlin | Junior Johnson & Associates | Ford |
| 24 | Butch Gilliland | Gilliland Racing | Pontiac |
| 25 | Ken Schrader | Hendrick Motorsports | Chevrolet |
| 26 | Brett Bodine | King Racing | Ford |
| 28 | Davey Allison | Robert Yates Racing | Ford |
| 29 | John Krebs | Diamond Ridge Motorsports | Chevrolet |
| 30 | Michael Waltrip | Bahari Racing | Pontiac |
| 33 | Harry Gant | Leo Jackson Motorsports | Oldsmobile |
| 37 | Rick Carelli | Chesrown Racing | Chevrolet |
| 41 | Greg Sacks | Larry Hedrick Motorsports | Chevrolet |
| 42 | Kyle Petty | SABCO Racing | Pontiac |
| 43 | Richard Petty | Petty Enterprises | Pontiac |
| 44 | Jeff Davis | Jeff Davis Racing | Ford |
| 49 | Stanley Smith | BS&S Motorsports | Chevrolet |
| 51 | Jeff Purvis | Phoenix Racing | Chevrolet |
| 52 | Jimmy Means | Jimmy Means Racing | Pontiac |
| 55 | Ted Musgrave | RaDiUs Motorsports | Ford |
| 58 | Wayne Jacks | Jacks Motorsports | Pontiac |
| 61 | Rick Scribner | Scribner Racing | Chevrolet |
| 66 | Jimmy Hensley (R) | Cale Yarborough Motorsports | Ford |
| 68 | Bobby Hamilton | TriStar Motorsports | Ford |
| 71 | Dave Marcis | Marcis Auto Racing | Chevrolet |
| 73 | Bill Schmitt | Schmitt Racing | Ford |
| 75 | Bill Sedgwick | Spears Motorsports | Chevrolet |
| 83 | Lake Speed | Speed Racing | Ford |
| 86 | Rich Woodland Jr. | Woodland Racing | Oldsmobile |
| 92 | Ron Hornaday Jr. | Fisher Racing | Chevrolet |
| 94 | Terry Labonte | Hagan Racing | Oldsmobile |

== Qualifying ==
Qualifying was split into two rounds. The first round was held on Friday, October 30, at 5:30 PM EST. Each driver would have one lap to set a time. During the first round, the top 20 drivers in the round would be guaranteed a starting spot in the race. If a driver was not able to guarantee a spot in the first round, they had the option to scrub their time from the first round and try and run a faster lap time in a second round qualifying run, held on Saturday, October 31, at 2:00 PM EST. As with the first round, each driver would have one lap to set a time. For this specific race, positions 21-40 would be decided on time, and depending on who needed it, a select amount of positions were given to cars who had not otherwise qualified but were high enough in owner's points; which was one for cars in the NASCAR Winston Cup Series and two extra provisionals for the NASCAR Winston West Series. If needed, a past champion who did not qualify on either time or provisionals could use a champion's provisional, adding one more spot to the field.

Rusty Wallace, driving for Penske Racing South, won the pole, setting a time of 28.094 and an average speed of 128.141 mph (206.223 km/h) in the first round.

Two drivers would fail to qualify.

=== Full qualifying results ===
| Pos. | # | Driver | Team | Make | Time | Speed |
|---|---|---|---|---|---|---|
| 1 | 2 | Rusty Wallace | Penske Racing South | Pontiac | 28.094 | 128.141 |
| 2 | 22 | Sterling Marlin | Junior Johnson & Associates | Ford | 28.284 | 127.280 |
| 3 | 7 | Alan Kulwicki | AK Racing | Ford | 28.363 | 126.926 |
| 4 | 5 | Ricky Rudd | Hendrick Motorsports | Chevrolet | 28.389 | 126.810 |
| 5 | 4 | Ernie Irvan | Morgan–McClure Motorsports | Chevrolet | 28.390 | 126.805 |
| 6 | 12 | Jimmy Spencer | Bobby Allison Motorsports | Ford | 28.400 | 126.761 |
| 7 | 42 | Kyle Petty | SABCO Racing | Pontiac | 28.426 | 126.645 |
| 8 | 6 | Mark Martin | Roush Racing | Ford | 28.426 | 126.645 |
| 9 | 25 | Ken Schrader | Hendrick Motorsports | Chevrolet | 28.436 | 126.600 |
| 10 | 17 | Darrell Waltrip | Darrell Waltrip Motorsports | Chevrolet | 28.465 | 126.471 |
| 11 | 30 | Michael Waltrip | Bahari Racing | Pontiac | 28.489 | 126.365 |
| 12 | 28 | Davey Allison | Robert Yates Racing | Ford | 28.491 | 126.356 |
| 13 | 10 | Derrike Cope | Whitcomb Racing | Chevrolet | 28.518 | 126.236 |
| 14 | 1 | Rick Mast | Precision Products Racing | Oldsmobile | 28.523 | 126.214 |
| 15 | 26 | Brett Bodine | King Racing | Ford | 28.527 | 126.196 |
| 16 | 55 | Ted Musgrave | RaDiUs Motorsports | Ford | 28.531 | 126.179 |
| 17 | 18 | Dale Jarrett | Joe Gibbs Racing | Chevrolet | 28.564 | 126.033 |
| 18 | 11 | Bill Elliott | Junior Johnson & Associates | Ford | 28.581 | 125.958 |
| 19 | 3 | Dale Earnhardt | Richard Childress Racing | Chevrolet | 28.606 | 125.848 |
| 20 | 15 | Geoff Bodine | Bud Moore Engineering | Ford | 28.633 | 125.729 |
Failed to lock in Round 1
| 21 | 68 | Bobby Hamilton | TriStar Motorsports | Ford | 28.642 | 125.690 |
| 22 | 21 | Morgan Shepherd | Wood Brothers Racing | Ford | 28.648 | 125.663 |
| 23 | 66 | Jimmy Hensley (R) | Cale Yarborough Motorsports | Ford | 28.662 | 125.602 |
| 24 | 43 | Richard Petty | Petty Enterprises | Pontiac | 28.775 | 125.109 |
| 25 | 41 | Hut Stricklin | Larry Hedrick Motorsports | Chevrolet | 28.789 | 125.048 |
| 26 | 94 | Terry Labonte | Hagan Racing | Oldsmobile | 28.798 | 125.009 |
| 27 | 16 | Wally Dallenbach Jr. | Roush Racing | Ford | 28.806 | 124.974 |
| 28 | 37 | Rick Carelli | Chesrown Racing | Chevrolet | 28.819 | 124.918 |
| 29 | 8 | Dick Trickle | Stavola Brothers Racing | Ford | 28.823 | 124.900 |
| 30 | 33 | Harry Gant | Leo Jackson Motorsports | Oldsmobile | 28.883 | 124.641 |
| 31 | 83 | Lake Speed | Speed Racing | Ford | 28.897 | 124.580 |
| 32 | 51 | Jeff Purvis | Phoenix Racing | Chevrolet | 28.935 | 124.417 |
| 33 | 29 | John Krebs | Diamond Ridge Motorsports | Chevrolet | 29.127 | 123.597 |
| 34 | 52 | Scott Gaylord | Jimmy Means Racing | Pontiac | 29.192 | 123.321 |
| 35 | 73 | Bill Schmitt | Schmitt Racing | Ford | 29.329 | 122.745 |
| 36 | 71 | Dave Marcis | Marcis Auto Racing | Chevrolet | 29.372 | 122.566 |
| 37 | 75 | Bill Sedgwick | Spears Motorsports | Chevrolet | 29.528 | 121.918 |
| 38 | 49 | Stanley Smith | BS&S Motorsports | Chevrolet | 29.602 | 121.613 |
| 39 | 44 | Jeff Davis | Jeff Davis Racing | Ford | 29.692 | 121.245 |
| 40 | 24 | Butch Gilliland | Gilliland Racing | Pontiac | 29.707 | 121.184 |
Provisionals
| 41 | 92 | Ron Hornaday Jr. | Fisher Racing | Chevrolet | - | - |
| 42 | 61 | Rick Scribner | Scribner Racing | Chevrolet | - | - |
Failed to qualify
| 43 | 86 | Rich Woodland Jr. | Woodland Racing | Oldsmobile | 30.616 | 117.586 |
| 44 | 58 | Wayne Jacks | Jacks Motorsports | Pontiac | - | - |
Official first round qualifying results
Official starting lineup

== Race results ==
| Fin | St | # | Driver | Team | Make | Laps | Led | Status | Pts | Winnings |
|---|---|---|---|---|---|---|---|---|---|---|
| 1 | 12 | 28 | Davey Allison | Robert Yates Racing | Ford | 312 | 30 | running | 180 | $65,285 |
| 2 | 8 | 6 | Mark Martin | Roush Racing | Ford | 312 | 44 | running | 175 | $40,555 |
| 3 | 10 | 17 | Darrell Waltrip | Darrell Waltrip Motorsports | Chevrolet | 312 | 0 | running | 165 | $32,130 |
| 4 | 3 | 7 | Alan Kulwicki | AK Racing | Ford | 312 | 49 | running | 165 | $25,730 |
| 5 | 6 | 12 | Jimmy Spencer | Bobby Allison Motorsports | Ford | 312 | 0 | running | 155 | $22,105 |
| 6 | 9 | 25 | Ken Schrader | Hendrick Motorsports | Chevrolet | 312 | 0 | running | 150 | $20,070 |
| 7 | 13 | 10 | Derrike Cope | Whitcomb Racing | Chevrolet | 312 | 0 | running | 146 | $13,220 |
| 8 | 21 | 68 | Bobby Hamilton | TriStar Motorsports | Ford | 312 | 0 | running | 142 | $15,820 |
| 9 | 2 | 22 | Sterling Marlin | Junior Johnson & Associates | Ford | 311 | 21 | running | 143 | $14,720 |
| 10 | 19 | 3 | Dale Earnhardt | Richard Childress Racing | Chevrolet | 311 | 0 | running | 134 | $21,370 |
| 11 | 11 | 30 | Michael Waltrip | Bahari Racing | Pontiac | 311 | 0 | running | 130 | $13,120 |
| 12 | 15 | 26 | Brett Bodine | King Racing | Ford | 311 | 0 | running | 127 | $12,520 |
| 13 | 27 | 16 | Wally Dallenbach Jr. | Roush Racing | Ford | 311 | 0 | running | 124 | $9,120 |
| 14 | 30 | 33 | Harry Gant | Leo Jackson Motorsports | Oldsmobile | 311 | 5 | running | 126 | $16,220 |
| 15 | 25 | 41 | Hut Stricklin | Larry Hedrick Motorsports | Chevrolet | 311 | 0 | running | 118 | $8,370 |
| 16 | 26 | 94 | Terry Labonte | Hagan Racing | Oldsmobile | 311 | 0 | running | 115 | $10,720 |
| 17 | 14 | 1 | Rick Mast | Precision Products Racing | Oldsmobile | 311 | 0 | running | 112 | $10,420 |
| 18 | 31 | 83 | Lake Speed | Speed Racing | Ford | 310 | 0 | running | 109 | $5,320 |
| 19 | 7 | 42 | Kyle Petty | SABCO Racing | Pontiac | 309 | 0 | running | 106 | $10,120 |
| 20 | 17 | 18 | Dale Jarrett | Joe Gibbs Racing | Chevrolet | 309 | 0 | running | 103 | $10,485 |
| 21 | 23 | 66 | Jimmy Hensley (R) | Cale Yarborough Motorsports | Ford | 309 | 0 | running | 100 | $7,410 |
| 22 | 24 | 43 | Richard Petty | Petty Enterprises | Pontiac | 309 | 0 | running | 97 | $9,510 |
| 23 | 33 | 29 | John Krebs | Diamond Ridge Motorsports | Chevrolet | 308 | 0 | running | 94 | $6,460 |
| 24 | 16 | 55 | Ted Musgrave | RaDiUs Motorsports | Ford | 302 | 2 | engine | 96 | $9,410 |
| 25 | 41 | 92 | Ron Hornaday Jr. | Fisher Racing | Chevrolet | 301 | 0 | running | 88 | $6,360 |
| 26 | 39 | 44 | Jeff Davis | Jeff Davis Racing | Ford | 299 | 0 | running | 85 | $4,785 |
| 27 | 37 | 75 | Bill Sedgwick | Spears Motorsports | Chevrolet | 299 | 0 | running | 82 | $7,285 |
| 28 | 1 | 2 | Rusty Wallace | Penske Racing South | Pontiac | 295 | 161 | running | 89 | $26,735 |
| 29 | 40 | 24 | Butch Gilliland | Gilliland Racing | Pontiac | 292 | 0 | running | 76 | $6,210 |
| 30 | 4 | 5 | Ricky Rudd | Hendrick Motorsports | Chevrolet | 288 | 0 | running | 73 | $12,885 |
| 31 | 18 | 11 | Bill Elliott | Junior Johnson & Associates | Ford | 260 | 0 | running | 70 | $13,660 |
| 32 | 38 | 49 | Stanley Smith | BS&S Motorsports | Chevrolet | 251 | 0 | running | 67 | $4,385 |
| 33 | 35 | 73 | Bill Schmitt | Schmitt Racing | Ford | 209 | 0 | engine | 64 | $4,860 |
| 34 | 5 | 4 | Ernie Irvan | Morgan–McClure Motorsports | Chevrolet | 201 | 0 | crash | 61 | $13,935 |
| 35 | 36 | 71 | Dave Marcis | Marcis Auto Racing | Chevrolet | 180 | 0 | engine | 58 | $4,310 |
| 36 | 32 | 51 | Jeff Purvis | Phoenix Racing | Chevrolet | 141 | 0 | brakes | 55 | $4,285 |
| 37 | 34 | 52 | Scott Gaylord | Jimmy Means Racing | Pontiac | 124 | 0 | engine | 52 | $4,265 |
| 38 | 22 | 21 | Morgan Shepherd | Wood Brothers Racing | Ford | 85 | 0 | engine | 49 | $7,255 |
| 39 | 20 | 15 | Geoff Bodine | Bud Moore Engineering | Ford | 69 | 0 | engine | 46 | $7,240 |
| 40 | 29 | 8 | Dick Trickle | Stavola Brothers Racing | Ford | 68 | 0 | crash | 43 | $4,205 |
| 41 | 42 | 61 | Rick Scribner | Scribner Racing | Chevrolet | 7 | 0 | engine | 40 | $4,205 |
| 42 | 28 | 37 | Rick Carelli | Chesrown Racing | Chevrolet | 1 | 0 | quit | 37 | $4,205 |
Official race results

== Standings after the race ==
Drivers' Championship standings

| | Pos | Driver | Points |
|---|---|---|---|
| 1 | 1 | Davey Allison | 3,928 |
| 1 | 2 | Alan Kulwicki | 3,898 (-30) |
| 2 | 3 | Bill Elliott | 3,888 (-40) |
| 1 | 4 | Harry Gant | 3,831 (–97) |
| 1 | 5 | Kyle Petty | 3,830 (–98) |
| | 6 | Mark Martin | 3,815 (–113) |
| | 7 | Ricky Rudd | 3,574 (–281) |
| 1 | 8 | Darrell Waltrip | 3,647 (–363) |
| 1 | 9 | Terry Labonte | 3,565 (–414) |
| 2 | 10 | Ernie Irvan | 3,514 (–429) |
Official driver's standings

- Note: Only the first 10 positions are included for the driver standings.

| Previous race: 1992 AC Delco 500 | NASCAR Winston Cup Series; 1992 season | Next race: 1992 Hooters 500 |

| Previous race: 1992 Winston October Classic | NASCAR Winston West Series; 1992 season | Next race: 1993 Western Auto Texas World Shootout II |
