= Dirk Stephens =

American racing driver (born 1963)

- Born: June 13, 1963 (age 63); Tumwater, Washington, U.S.

NASCAR Cup Series career
- 2 races run over 2 years
- Best finish: 63th (1993)
- First race: 1993 Save Mart Supermarkets 300K (Sonoma)
- Last race: 1993 Slick 50 500 (Phoenix)
Wins	Top tens	Poles
0	0	0

NASCAR O'Reilly Auto Parts Series career
- 28 races run over 3 years
- Best finish: 31st (1994)
- First race: 1994 Hardee's Frisco 250 (Richmond)
- Last race: 1995 Sears Auto Center 250 (Milwaukee)
Wins	Top tens	Poles
0	2	0

NASCAR FedEx Freight Truck Series career
- 1 race run over 1 year
- Best finish: 76th (1995)
- First race: 1995 Lowe's 150 (North Wilkesboro)
Wins	Top tens	Poles
0	0	0

ARCA Menards Series career
- 3 races run over 2 years
- First race: 1993 Western Auto Texas Shootout II (Texas World)
Wins	Top tens	Poles
0	1	0

ARCA Menards Series West career
- 19 races run over 4 years
- Best finish: 2nd (1993)
- First race: 1988 Budweiser 300 (Spokane)
- Last race: 1993 Slick 50 500 (Phoenix)
- First win: 1993 Valvoline 200 (Tucson)
- Last win: 1993 Winston 200 (Tri-City)
Wins	Top tens	Poles
3	14	1
- Statistics up to date as of April 11, 2025.

Dirk Stephens (born June 13, 1963) is an American former professional stock car racing driver who has previously competed in the NASCAR Winston Cup Series, the NASCAR Busch Series, and the NASCAR Craftsman Truck Series.

Stephens has also competed in the NASCAR Winston West Series, the NASCAR Northwest Series, the NASCAR Southwest Series, and the USAR Hooters Late Model Series.

== Motorsports career results ==
=== NASCAR ===
(key) (Bold - Pole position awarded by qualifying time. Italics - Pole position earned by points standings or practice time. * – Most laps led.)

==== Winston Cup Series ====
NASCAR Winston Cup Series results
Year	Team	No.	Make	1	2	3	4	5	6	7	8	9	10	11	12	13	14	15	16	17	18	19	20	21	22	23	24	25	26	27	28	29	30	31	NWCC	Pts	Ref
1993	Tom Craigen	20	Ford	DAY	CAR	RCH	ATL	DAR	BRI	NWS	MAR	TAL	SON; 30	CLT	DOV	POC	MCH	DAY	NHA	POC	TAL	GLN	MCH	BRI	DAR	RCH	DOV	MAR	NWS	CLT	CAR	PHO; 42	ATL		63rd	110	
1994	Bob Whitcomb Racing	51	Ford	DAY	CAR	RCH	ATL	DAR	BRI	NWS	MAR	TAL	SON	CLT	DOV	POC	MCH	DAY	NHA	POC	TAL	IND	GLN	MCH	BRI	DAR	RCH; DNQ	DOV	MAR	NWS	CLT	CAR	PHO	ATL	NA	0	

==== Busch Series ====
NASCAR Busch Series results
Year	Team	No.	Make	1	2	3	4	5	6	7	8	9	10	11	12	13	14	15	16	17	18	19	20	21	22	23	24	25	26	27	28	NBSC	Pts	Ref
1993	Unknown	NA	Chevy	DAY	CAR	RCH	DAR	BRI	HCY	ROU	MAR	NZH	CLT	DOV	MYB	GLN	MLW	TAL	IRP	MCH	NHA	BRI	DAR	RCH	DOV	ROU	CLT; DNQ	MAR	CAR	HCY	ATL	NA	0	
1994	Bob Whitcomb Racing	15	Ford	DAY	CAR	RCH; 37	ATL; 12	MAR; DNQ	DAR; 20	HCY; 21	BRI; 21	ROU	NHA; 39	NZH; 24	CLT; DNQ	DOV	MYB; 30	GLN	MLW; 27	SBO; 12	TAL; DNQ	HCY; DNQ	IRP; 25	MCH	BRI; 35	DAR; 17	RCH	DOV	CLT; 38	MAR	CAR; 18	31st	1317	
1995	Shoemaker Racing	64	Chevy	DAY	CAR; 26	RCH; 35	ATL; 35	NSV; 23	DAR; 28	BRI; 32	HCY; 13	NHA; DNQ	NZH; 32	CLT; 28	DOV; 35	MYB; 18	GLN; 40	MLW; 18	TAL	SBO	IRP	MCH	BRI	DAR	RCH	DOV	CLT	CAR	HOM			36th	1030	

==== SuperTruck Series ====
NASCAR SuperTruck Series results
Year	Team	No.	Make	1	2	3	4	5	6	7	8	9	10	11	12	13	14	15	16	17	18	19	20	NSTC	Pts	Ref
1995	Steve Sellers Racing	78	Ford	PHO	TUS	SGS	MMR	POR	EVG	I70	LVL	BRI	MLW	CNS	HPT	IRP	FLM	RCH	MAR	NWS; 27	SON	MMR	PHO	76th	119	

=== ARCA Hooters SuperCar Series ===
(key) (Bold – Pole position awarded by qualifying time. Italics – Pole position earned by points standings or practice time. * – Most laps led.)

ARCA Hooters SuperCar Series results
Year	Team	No.	Make	1	2	3	4	5	6	7	8	9	10	11	12	13	14	15	16	17	18	19	AHSCSC	Pts	Ref
1993	Tom Craigen	20W	Ford	DAY	FIF	TWS; 6	TAL	KIL	CMS	FRS	TOL	POC	MCH	FRS	POC	KIL	ISF	DSF	TOL	SLM	WIN	ATL	NA	0	

==== Busch North Series ====
NASCAR Busch North Series results
Year	Team	No.	Make	1	2	3	4	5	6	7	8	9	10	11	12	13	14	15	16	17	18	19	20	21	22	NBNSC	Pts	Ref
1995	Shoemaker Racing	64	Chevy	DAY	NHA	LEE	JEN	NHA; DNQ	NZH	HOL	BEE	TMP	GLN	NHA	TIO	MND	GLN	EPP	RPS	LEE	STA	BEE	NHA	TMP	LRP	NA	0	

==== Winston West Series ====
NASCAR Winston West Series results
Year	Team	No.	Make	1	2	3	4	5	6	7	8	9	10	11	12	13	14	Pos.	Pts	Ref
1988	Unknown	88	Pontiac	SON	MMR	RSD	SGP; 21	POR	EVG	MMR	PHO							NA	0	
1991	Midgley Racing	09	Pontiac	EVG	MMR	SON	SGS	POR	EVG	SSS; 6	MMR	PHO						42nd	150	
1992	Collins Motorsports	28	Olds	**MMR**; 10	SGS	SON	SHA	POR										19th	402	
1992	Gary Bechtel	2	Pontiac						EVG; 15	SSS; 6	CAJ	TWS	MMR	PHO				19th	402	
1993	Tom Craigen	20	Ford	TWS; 6	MMR; 10	SGS; 2	SON; 30	TUS; 1	SHA; 5	**EVG**; 12	POR; 4	CBS; 2	SSS; 1*	CAJ; 3	TCR; 1*	MMR; 2	PHO; 42	2nd	2292	
