= 1997 Save Mart Supermarkets 300 =

Ninth race of the 1997 NASCAR Winston Cup Series

Race details
- Race 9 of 32 in the 1997 NASCAR Winston Cup Series
- The 1997 Save Mart Supermarkets 300 program cover, featuring Rusty Wallace.
- Date: May 4, 1997
- Official name: 9th Annual Save Mart Supermarkets 300
- Location: Sonoma, California, Sears Point Raceway
- Course: Permanent racing facility
- Course length: 2.52 miles (4.06 km)
- Distance: 74 laps, 186.48 mi (300.11 km)
- Average speed: 75.788 miles per hour (121.969 km/h)

Pole position
Driver	Mark Martin	Roush Racing
- Time: 1:37.751

Most laps led
Driver	Mark Martin	Roush Racing
- Laps: 69

Winner
No. 6	Mark Martin	Roush Racing

Television in the United States
- Network: ESPN
- Announcers: Bob Jenkins, Ned Jarrett, Benny Parsons

Radio in the United States
- Radio: Motor Racing Network

The 1997 Save Mart Supermarkets 300 was the ninth stock car race of the 1997 NASCAR Winston Cup Series, the third race of the 1997 NASCAR Winston West Series, and the ninth iteration of the event. The race was held on Sunday, May 4, 1997, in Sonoma, California, at the Grand Prix layout of Sears Point Raceway, a 2.52 miles (4.06 km) permanent road course layout. The race took the scheduled 74 laps to complete. At race's end, Roush Racing driver Mark Martin would dominate the majority of the race to take his 19th career NASCAR Winston Cup Series victory and his first victory of the season. To fill out the top three, Jeff Gordon and Terry Labonte, both driving for Hendrick Motorsports, would finish second and third, respectively.

== Background ==
The layout of Sears Point Raceway used by NASCAR at the time.

Sears Point Raceway is one of two road courses to hold NASCAR races, the other being Watkins Glen International. The standard road course at Sears Point Raceway is a 12-turn course that is 2.52 miles (4.06 km) long; the track was modified in 1998, adding the Chute, which bypassed turns 5 and 6, shortening the course to 1.95 miles (3.14 km). The Chute was only used for NASCAR events such as this race, and was criticized by many drivers, who preferred the full layout. In 2001, it was replaced with a 70-degree turn, 4A, bringing the track to its current dimensions of 1.99 miles (3.20 km).

=== Entry list ===
- (R) denotes rookie driver.

#	Driver	Team	Make
00W	Scott Gaylord	Oliver Racing	Chevrolet
1	Morgan Shepherd	Precision Products Racing	Pontiac
2	Rusty Wallace	Penske Racing South	Ford
3	Dale Earnhardt	Richard Childress Racing	Chevrolet
4	Sterling Marlin	Morgan–McClure Motorsports	Chevrolet
5	Terry Labonte	Hendrick Motorsports	Chevrolet
6	Mark Martin	Roush Racing	Ford
7	Geoff Bodine	Mattei Motorsports	Ford
07	Sean Woodside	Golden West Motorsports	Pontiac
8	Hut Stricklin	Stavola Brothers Racing	Ford
9	Jeff Davis	Melling Racing	Ford
09W	R. K. Smith	Smith Racing	Pontiac
10	Ricky Rudd	Rudd Performance Motorsports	Ford
11	Brett Bodine	Brett Bodine Racing	Ford
15W	Rick Scribner	Scribner Racing	Chevrolet
16	Ted Musgrave	Roush Racing	Ford
16W	Bill McAnally	Bill McAnally Racing	Chevrolet
17	Darrell Waltrip	Darrell Waltrip Motorsports	Chevrolet
18	Bobby Labonte	Joe Gibbs Racing	Pontiac
19	Gary Bradberry	TriStar Motorsports	Ford
20	Lance Hooper	Ranier-Walsh Racing	Ford
21	Michael Waltrip	Wood Brothers Racing	Ford
22	Ward Burton	Bill Davis Racing	Pontiac
23	Jimmy Spencer	Haas-Carter Motorsports	Ford
24	Jeff Gordon	Hendrick Motorsports	Chevrolet
25	Ricky Craven	Hendrick Motorsports	Chevrolet
28	Ernie Irvan	Robert Yates Racing	Ford
29	Robert Pressley	Diamond Ridge Motorsports	Chevrolet
30	Johnny Benson Jr.	Bahari Racing	Pontiac
31	Mike Skinner (R)	Richard Childress Racing	Chevrolet
33	Ken Schrader	Andy Petree Racing	Chevrolet
35	Larry Gunselman	Race Stuff Motorsports	Ford
36	Derrike Cope	MB2 Motorsports	Pontiac
37	Jeremy Mayfield	Kranefuss-Haas Racing	Ford
38	Butch Gilliland	Stroppe Motorsports	Ford
40	Robby Gordon (R)	Team SABCO	Chevrolet
41	Steve Grissom	Larry Hedrick Motorsports	Chevrolet
42	Joe Nemechek	Team SABCO	Chevrolet
43	Bobby Hamilton	Petty Enterprises	Pontiac
44	Kyle Petty	Petty Enterprises	Pontiac
45W	Gary Smith	Strauser Racing	Chevrolet
46	Wally Dallenbach Jr.	Team SABCO	Chevrolet
71	Dave Marcis	Marcis Auto Racing	Chevrolet
75	Rick Mast	Butch Mock Motorsports	Ford
77	Bobby Hillin Jr.	Jasper Motorsports	Ford
78	Tom Hubert	Triad Motorsports	Ford
78W	Chuck Pruett	Golden Gate Racing	Chevrolet
81	Kenny Wallace	FILMAR Racing	Ford
88	Dale Jarrett	Robert Yates Racing	Ford
89W	Wayne Jacks	Jacks Motorsports	Pontiac
90	Dick Trickle	Donlavey Racing	Ford
91	Mike Wallace	LJ Racing	Chevrolet
94	Bill Elliott	Bill Elliott Racing	Ford
96	David Green (R)	American Equipment Racing	Chevrolet
97	Chad Little	Mark Rypien Motorsports	Pontiac
98	John Andretti	Cale Yarborough Motorsports	Ford
99	Jeff Burton	Roush Racing	Ford

== Qualifying ==
Qualifying was split into two rounds. The first round was held on Friday, May 3, at 6:00 PM EST. Each driver would have one lap to set a time. During the first round, the top 25 drivers in the round would be guaranteed a starting spot in the race. If a driver was not able to guarantee a spot in the first round, they had the option to scrub their time from the first round and try and run a faster lap time in a second round qualifying run, held on Saturday, May 4, at 1:00 PM EST. As with the first round, each driver would have one lap to set a time. Positions 26-38 would be decided on time, and depending on who needed it, the 39th thru either the 42nd, 43rd, or 44th position would be based on provisionals. Four spots are awarded by the use of provisionals based on owner's points. The fifth is awarded to a past champion who has not otherwise qualified for the race. If no past champion needs the provisional, the field would be limited to 42 cars. If a champion needed it, the field would expand to 43 cars. If the race was a companion race with the NASCAR Winston West Series, four spots would be determined by NASCAR Winston Cup Series provisionals, while the final two spots would be given to teams in the Winston West Series, leaving the field at 44 cars.

Mark Martin, driving for Roush Racing, would win the pole, setting a time of 1:37.751 and an average speed of 92.807 miles per hour (149.358 km/h).

13 drivers would fail to qualify: Rick Mast, Joe Nemechek, R. K. Smith, Robert Pressley, Chad Little, Gary Smith, David Green, Dick Trickle, Chuck Pruett, Bill McAnally, Scott Gaylord, Wayne Jacks, and Rick Scribner.

=== Full qualifying results ===
Pos.	#	Driver	Team	Make	Time	Speed
1	6	Mark Martin	Roush Racing	Ford	1:37.751	92.807
2	2	Rusty Wallace	Penske Racing South	Ford	1:38.041	92.533
3	24	Jeff Gordon	Hendrick Motorsports	Chevrolet	1:38.106	92.471
4	5	Terry Labonte	Hendrick Motorsports	Chevrolet	1:38.147	92.533
5	11	Brett Bodine	Brett Bodine Racing	Ford	1:38.363	92.230
6	21	Michael Waltrip	Wood Brothers Racing	Ford	1:38.545	92.059
7	7	Geoff Bodine	Geoff Bodine Racing	Ford	1:38.597	92.011
8	88	Dale Jarrett	Robert Yates Racing	Ford	1:38.631	91.979
9	46	Wally Dallenbach Jr.	Team SABCO	Chevrolet	1:38.670	91.943
10	10	Ricky Rudd	Rudd Performance Motorsports	Ford	1:38.735	91.882
11	44	Kyle Petty	Petty Enterprises	Pontiac	1:38.785	91.836
12	16	Ted Musgrave	Roush Racing	Ford	1:38.849	91.776
13	94	Bill Elliott	Bill Elliott Racing	Ford	1:38.955	91.678
14	22	Ward Burton	Bill Davis Racing	Pontiac	1:38.956	91.677
15	33	Ken Schrader	Andy Petree Racing	Chevrolet	1:39.058	91.583
16	4	Sterling Marlin	Morgan–McClure Motorsports	Chevrolet	1:39.092	91.551
17	98	John Andretti	Cale Yarborough Motorsports	Ford	1:39.115	91.530
18	40	Robby Gordon (R)	Team SABCO	Chevrolet	1:39.312	91.348
19	31	Mike Skinner (R)	Richard Childress Racing	Chevrolet	1:39.389	91.278
20	99	Jeff Burton	Roush Racing	Ford	1:39.390	91.277
21	36	Derrike Cope	MB2 Motorsports	Pontiac	1:39.499	91.177
22	8	Hut Stricklin	Stavola Brothers Racing	Ford	1:39.552	91.128
23	43	Bobby Hamilton	Petty Enterprises	Pontiac	1:39.589	91.094
24	28	Ernie Irvan	Robert Yates Racing	Ford	1:39.594	91.090
25	23	Jimmy Spencer	Travis Carter Enterprises	Ford	1:39.636	91.051
26	17	Darrell Waltrip	Darrell Waltrip Motorsports	Chevrolet	1:38.446	92.152
27	78	Tom Hubert	Triad Motorsports	Ford	1:38.763	91.856
28	38	Butch Gilliland	Stroppe Motorsports	Ford	1:38.898	91.731
29	18	Bobby Labonte	Joe Gibbs Racing	Pontiac	1:38.984	91.651
30	71	Dave Marcis	Marcis Auto Racing	Chevrolet	1:39.234	91.420
31	77	Bobby Hillin Jr.	Jasper Motorsports	Ford	1:39.247	91.408
32	3	Dale Earnhardt	Richard Childress Racing	Chevrolet	1:39.317	91.344
33	41	Steve Grissom	Larry Hedrick Motorsports	Chevrolet	1:39.335	91.327
34	91	Mike Wallace	LJ Racing	Chevrolet	1:39.577	91.105
35	30	Johnny Benson Jr.	Bahari Racing	Pontiac	1:39.610	91.075
36	81	Kenny Wallace	FILMAR Racing	Ford	1:39.696	90.997
37	20	Lance Hooper	Ranier-Walsh Racing	Ford	1:39.882	90.827
38	19	Gary Bradberry	TriStar Motorsports	Ford	1:39.887	90.823
Winston Cup provisionals
39	37	Jeremy Mayfield	Kranefuss-Haas Racing	Ford	-*	-*
40	25	Ricky Craven	Hendrick Motorsports	Chevrolet	-*	-*
41	1	Morgan Shepherd	Precision Products Racing	Pontiac	-*	-*
42	9	Jeff Davis	Melling Racing	Ford	-*	-*
Winston West provisionals
43	07	Sean Woodside	Golden West Motorsports	Pontiac	-*	-*
44	35	Larry Gunselman	Race Stuff Motorsports	Ford	-*	-*
Failed to qualify
45	75	Rick Mast	Butch Mock Motorsports	Ford	-*	-*
46	42	Joe Nemechek	Team SABCO	Chevrolet	-*	-*
47	09W	R. K. Smith	Smith Racing	Pontiac	-*	-*
48	29	Robert Pressley	Diamond Ridge Motorsports	Chevrolet	-*	-*
49	97	Chad Little	Mark Rypien Motorsports	Pontiac	-*	-*
50	45W	Gary Smith	Strauser Racing	Chevrolet	-*	-*
51	96	David Green (R)	American Equipment Racing	Chevrolet	-*	-*
52	90	Dick Trickle	Donlavey Racing	Ford	-*	-*
53	78W	Chuck Pruett	Golden Gate Racing	Chevrolet	-*	-*
54	16W	Bill McAnally	Bill McAnally Racing	Chevrolet	-*	-*
55	00W	Scott Gaylord	Oliver Racing	Chevrolet	-*	-*
56	89W	Wayne Jacks	Jacks Motorsports	Pontiac	-*	-*
57	15W	Rick Scribner	Scribner Racing	Chevrolet	-*	-*
Official qualifying results

*Time not available.

== Race results ==
Fin	St	#	Driver	Team	Make	Laps	Led	Status	Pts	Winnings
1	1	6	Mark Martin	Roush Racing	Ford	74	69	running	185	$113,995
2	3	24	Jeff Gordon	Hendrick Motorsports	Chevrolet	74	0	running	170	$66,065
3	4	5	Terry Labonte	Hendrick Motorsports	Chevrolet	74	1	running	170	$63,700
4	8	88	Dale Jarrett	Robert Yates Racing	Ford	74	2	running	165	$50,135
5	26	17	Darrell Waltrip	Darrell Waltrip Motorsports	Chevrolet	74	0	running	155	$35,920
6	5	11	Brett Bodine	Brett Bodine Racing	Ford	74	0	running	150	$40,795
7	6	21	Michael Waltrip	Wood Brothers Racing	Ford	74	0	running	146	$37,345
8	24	28	Ernie Irvan	Robert Yates Racing	Ford	74	0	running	142	$40,145
9	20	99	Jeff Burton	Roush Racing	Ford	74	0	running	138	$39,595
10	14	22	Ward Burton	Bill Davis Racing	Pontiac	74	0	running	134	$32,440
11	12	16	Ted Musgrave	Roush Racing	Ford	74	0	running	130	$34,880
12	32	3	Dale Earnhardt	Richard Childress Racing	Chevrolet	74	0	running	127	$39,580
13	11	44	Kyle Petty	Petty Enterprises	Pontiac	74	0	running	124	$22,980
14	25	23	Jimmy Spencer	Travis Carter Enterprises	Ford	74	0	running	121	$33,680
15	9	46	Wally Dallenbach Jr.	Team SABCO	Chevrolet	74	0	running	118	$23,930
16	19	31	Mike Skinner (R)	Richard Childress Racing	Chevrolet	74	0	running	115	$22,830
17	33	41	Steve Grissom	Larry Hedrick Motorsports	Chevrolet	74	0	running	112	$32,855
18	21	36	Derrike Cope	MB2 Motorsports	Pontiac	74	0	running	109	$21,705
19	23	43	Bobby Hamilton	Petty Enterprises	Pontiac	74	0	running	106	$36,680
20	29	18	Bobby Labonte	Joe Gibbs Racing	Pontiac	74	0	running	103	$41,105
21	35	30	Johnny Benson Jr.	Bahari Racing	Pontiac	74	0	running	100	$32,555
22	34	91	Mike Wallace	LJ Racing	Chevrolet	74	0	running	97	$23,505
23	41	1	Morgan Shepherd	Precision Products Racing	Pontiac	74	0	running	94	$32,280
24	28	38	Butch Gilliland	Stroppe Motorsports	Ford	74	0	running	91	$21,410
25	30	71	Dave Marcis	Marcis Auto Racing	Chevrolet	74	0	running	88	$25,350
26	16	4	Sterling Marlin	Morgan–McClure Motorsports	Chevrolet	74	0	running	85	$37,380
27	39	37	Jeremy Mayfield	Kranefuss-Haas Racing	Ford	73	0	running	82	$24,965
28	27	78	Tom Hubert	Triad Motorsports	Ford	73	0	running	79	$21,350
29	22	8	Hut Stricklin	Stavola Brothers Racing	Ford	73	0	running	76	$31,840
30	17	98	John Andretti	Cale Yarborough Motorsports	Ford	73	0	running	73	$31,710
31	15	33	Ken Schrader	Andy Petree Racing	Chevrolet	73	0	running	70	$31,290
32	13	94	Bill Elliott	Bill Elliott Racing	Ford	70	0	running	67	$31,140
33	43	07	Sean Woodside	Golden West Motorsports	Pontiac	69	0	running	64	$20,905
34	10	10	Ricky Rudd	Rudd Performance Motorsports	Ford	66	0	running	61	$45,890
35	31	77	Bobby Hillin Jr.	Jasper Motorsports	Ford	64	0	running	58	$23,965
36	36	81	Kenny Wallace	FILMAR Racing	Ford	61	0	accident	55	$30,850
37	42	9	Jeff Davis	Melling Racing	Ford	60	0	accident	52	$30,745
38	44	35	Larry Gunselman	Race Stuff Motorsports	Ford	60	0	rear end	49	$20,720
39	40	25	Ricky Craven	Hendrick Motorsports	Chevrolet	58	0	running	46	$30,220
40	2	2	Rusty Wallace	Penske Racing South	Ford	47	2	engine	48	$38,720
41	18	40	Robby Gordon (R)	Team SABCO	Chevrolet	43	0	engine	40	$27,720
42	37	20	Lance Hooper	Ranier-Walsh Racing	Ford	40	0	engine	37	$21,820
43	38	19	Gary Bradberry	TriStar Motorsports	Ford	31	0	engine	34	$20,720
44	7	7	Geoff Bodine	Geoff Bodine Racing	Ford	10	0	engine	31	$29,220
Official race results

Previous race: 1997 Goody's Headache Powder 500 (Martinsville)	NASCAR Winston Cup Series; 1997 season	Next race: 1997 Winston 500

Previous race: 1997 Winston 200	NASCAR Winston West Series; 1997 season	Next race: 1997 Exide NASCAR Select Batteries 200
