= 1992 Save Mart 300K =

12th race of the 1992 NASCAR Winston Cup Series

Race details
- Race 12 of 29 in the 1992 NASCAR Winston Cup Series
- The 1992 Save Mart 300K program cover, featuring Richard Petty.
- Date: June 7, 1992
- Official name: 4th Annual Save Mart 300K
- Location: Sonoma, California, Sears Point Raceway
- Course: Permanent racing facility
- Course length: 2.52 miles (4.06 km)
- Distance: 74 laps, 186.48 mi (300.11 km)
- Scheduled distance: 74 laps, 186.48 mi (300.11 km)
- Average speed: 81.413 miles per hour (131.022 km/h)
- Attendance: 83,000

Pole position
Driver	Ricky Rudd	Hendrick Motorsports
- Time: 1:39.709

Most laps led
Driver	Bill Elliott	Junior Johnson & Associates
- Laps: 22

Winner
No. 4	Ernie Irvan	Morgan-McClure Motorsports

Television in the United States
- Network: ESPN
- Announcers: Bob Jenkins, Ned Jarrett, Benny Parsons

Radio in the United States
- Radio: Motor Racing Network

The 1992 Save Mart 300K was the 12th stock car race of the 1992 NASCAR Winston Cup Series season, the third race of the 1992 NASCAR Winston West Series, and the fourth iteration of the event. The race was held on Sunday, June 7, 1992, before an audience of 83,000 at the Grand Prix layout of Sears Point Raceway, a 2.52 miles (4.06 km) permanent road course layout. The race took the scheduled 74 laps to complete. In the final laps of the race, Morgan–McClure Motorsports driver Ernie Irvan would manage to make a late-race pass for the lead with eight to go, coming back from an early penalty to take his fourth career NASCAR Winston Cup Series victory and his first victory of the season. To fill out the top three, Hagan Racing driver Terry Labonte and Roush Racing driver Mark Martin would finish second and third, respectively.

== Background ==
The layout of Sears Point Raceway used by NASCAR at the time.

Sears Point Raceway at the time was one of two road courses to hold NASCAR races, the other being Watkins Glen International. The standard road course at Sears Point Raceway is a 12-turn course that is 2.52 miles (4.06 km) long; the track was modified in 1998, adding the Chute, which bypassed turns 5 and 6, shortening the course to 1.95 miles (3.14 km). The Chute was only used for NASCAR events such as this race, and was criticized by many drivers, who preferred the full layout. In 2001, it was replaced with a 70-degree turn, 4A, bringing the track to its current dimensions of 1.99 miles (3.20 km).

=== Entry list ===
- (R) denotes rookie driver.

#	Driver	Team	Make	Sponsor
0	Irv Hoerr	Precision Products Racing	Oldsmobile	Skoal
1	Rick Mast	Precision Products Racing	Ford	Skoal
2	Rusty Wallace	Penske Racing South	Pontiac	Miller Genuine Draft
3	Dale Earnhardt	Richard Childress Racing	Chevrolet	GM Goodwrench Service Plus
4	Ernie Irvan	Morgan–McClure Motorsports	Chevrolet	Kodak
04	Bobby Woods	Lipseia Racing	Pontiac	Graph-Ricks Racing Decals
5	Ricky Rudd	Hendrick Motorsports	Chevrolet	Tide
6	Mark Martin	Roush Racing	Ford	Valvoline
7	Alan Kulwicki	AK Racing	Ford	Hooters
8	Dick Trickle	Stavola Brothers Racing	Ford	Snickers
9	Bill Schmitt	Melling Racing	Ford	Raley's Supermarkets, 7 Up
09	R. K. Smith	Midgley Racing	Pontiac	Midgley Racing
10	Derrike Cope	Whitcomb Racing	Chevrolet	Purolator Filters
11	Bill Elliott	Junior Johnson & Associates	Ford	Budweiser
12	Hut Stricklin	Bobby Allison Motorsports	Chevrolet	Raybestos
15	Geoff Bodine	Bud Moore Engineering	Ford	Motorcraft
16	Wally Dallenbach Jr.	Roush Racing	Ford	Keystone
17	Darrell Waltrip	Darrell Waltrip Motorsports	Chevrolet	Western Auto
18	Dale Jarrett	Joe Gibbs Racing	Chevrolet	Interstate Batteries
21	Morgan Shepherd	Wood Brothers Racing	Ford	Citgo
22	Sterling Marlin	Junior Johnson & Associates	Ford	Maxwell House
24	Butch Gilliland	Gilliland Racing	Pontiac	Anaheim Electric
25	Ken Schrader	Hendrick Motorsports	Chevrolet	Kodiak
26	Brett Bodine	King Racing	Ford	Quaker State
28	Davey Allison	Robert Yates Racing	Ford	Texaco, Havoline
30	Michael Waltrip	Bahari Racing	Pontiac	Pennzoil
33	Harry Gant	Leo Jackson Motorsports	Oldsmobile	Skoal Bandit
37	Rick Carelli	Chesrown Racing	Chevrolet	Hoosier Racing Tire
41	Greg Sacks	Larry Hedrick Motorsports	Chevrolet	Kellogg's Frosted Flakes
42	Kyle Petty	SABCO Racing	Pontiac	Mello Yello
43	Richard Petty	Petty Enterprises	Pontiac	STP
44	Jack Sellers	Emerson Racing	Buick	Dad's Root Beer
50	Hershel McGriff	JTC Racing	Chevrolet	Star Race Computers
51	Rick Scribner	Scribner Racing	Chevrolet	All Pro Auto Parts
52	Tommy Kendall	Jimmy Means Racing	Pontiac	Save Mart Supermarkets
55	Ted Musgrave	RaDiUs Motorsports	Oldsmobile	Jasper Engines & Transmissions
58	Wayne Jacks	Jacks Motorsports	Pontiac	Imperial Palace
60	Mike Chase	Kaylan Young Racing	Pontiac	Bowman
66	Jimmy Hensley (R)	Cale Yarborough Motorsports	Ford	Phillips 66 TropArtic
68	Bobby Hamilton	TriStar Motorsports	Oldsmobile	Country Time
71	Dave Marcis	Marcis Auto Racing	Chevrolet	Big Apple Markets
75	Bill Sedgwick	Spears Motorsports	Chevrolet	Spears Manufacturing
92	Ron Hornaday Jr.	Fisher Racing	Chevrolet	Palmdale Chiropractic
94	Terry Labonte	Hagan Racing	Ford	Sunoco
99	John Krebs	Diamond Ridge Motorsports	Pontiac	Diamond Ridge Motorsports

== Qualifying ==
Qualifying was split into two rounds. The first round was held on Friday, June 5, at 6:30 PM EST. Each driver would have one lap to set a time. During the first round, the top 25 drivers in the round would be guaranteed a starting spot in the race. If a driver was not able to guarantee a spot in the first round, they had the option to scrub their time from the first round and try and run a faster lap time in a second round qualifying run, held on Saturday, June 6, at 1:00 PM EST. As with the first round, each driver would have one lap to set a time. For this specific race, positions 26-40 would be decided on time, and depending on who needed it, a select amount of positions were given to cars who had not otherwise qualified but were high enough in owner's points; which was one for cars in the NASCAR Winston Cup Series and two extra provisionals for the NASCAR Winston West Series. If needed, a past champion who did not qualify on either time or provisionals could use a champion's provisional, adding one more spot to the field.

Ricky Rudd, driving for Hendrick Motorsports, would win the pole, setting a time of 1:39.709 and an average speed of 90.985 miles per hour (146.426 km/h) in the first round.

Two drivers would fail to qualify.

=== Full qualifying results ===
Pos.	#	Driver	Team	Make	Time	Speed
1	5	Ricky Rudd	Hendrick Motorsports	Chevrolet	1:39.709	90.985
2	4	Ernie Irvan	Morgan–McClure Motorsports	Chevrolet	1:40.392	90.366
3	2	Rusty Wallace	Penske Racing South	Pontiac	1:40.831	89.972
4	17	Darrell Waltrip	Darrell Waltrip Motorsports	Chevrolet	1:40.874	89.934
5	11	Bill Elliott	Junior Johnson & Associates	Ford	1:40.975	89.844
6	94	Terry Labonte	Hagan Racing	Oldsmobile	1:41.512	89.369
7	7	Alan Kulwicki	AK Racing	Ford	1:41.646	89.251
8	6	Mark Martin	Roush Racing	Ford	1:41.709	89.196
9	16	Wally Dallenbach Jr.	Roush Racing	Ford	1:41.794	89.121
10	28	Davey Allison	Robert Yates Racing	Ford	1:41.904	89.025
11	22	Sterling Marlin	Junior Johnson & Associates	Ford	1:41.907	89.022
12	3	Dale Earnhardt	Richard Childress Racing	Chevrolet	1:41.911	89.019
13	25	Ken Schrader	Hendrick Motorsports	Chevrolet	1:41.913	89.017
14	52	Tommy Kendall	Jimmy Means Racing	Pontiac	1:41.921	89.010
15	15	Geoff Bodine	Bud Moore Engineering	Ford	1:41.939	88.994
16	26	Brett Bodine	King Racing	Ford	1:42.037	88.909
17	92	Ron Hornaday Jr.	Fisher Racing	Chevrolet	1:42.073	88.878
18	0	Irv Hoerr	Precision Products Racing	Oldsmobile	1:42.344	88.642
19	42	Kyle Petty	SABCO Racing	Pontiac	1:42.540	88.473
20	10	Derrike Cope	Whitcomb Racing	Chevrolet	1:42.543	88.470
21	21	Morgan Shepherd	Wood Brothers Racing	Ford	1:42.669	88.362
22	66	Jimmy Hensley (R)	Cale Yarborough Motorsports	Ford	1:42.952	88.119
23	18	Dale Jarrett	Joe Gibbs Racing	Chevrolet	1:43.045	88.039
24	33	Harry Gant	Leo Jackson Motorsports	Oldsmobile	1:43.053	88.032
25	68	Bobby Hamilton	TriStar Motorsports	Oldsmobile	1:43.568	87.595
Failed to lock in Round 1
26	30	Michael Waltrip	Bahari Racing	Pontiac	1:41.770	89.142
27	71	Dave Marcis	Marcis Auto Racing	Chevrolet	1:43.185	87.920
28	8	Dick Trickle	Stavola Brothers Racing	Ford	1:43.189	87.916
29	09	R. K. Smith	Midgley Racing	Pontiac	1:43.691	87.491
30	43	Richard Petty	Petty Enterprises	Pontiac	1:43.727	87.460
31	55	Ted Musgrave	RaDiUs Motorsports	Oldsmobile	1:43.730	87.458
32	75	Bill Sedgwick	Spears Motorsports	Chevrolet	1:43.796	87.402
33	1	Rick Mast	Precision Products Racing	Oldsmobile	1:43.828	87.375
34	9	Bill Schmitt	Melling Racing	Ford	1:43.910	87.306
35	50	Hershel McGriff	JTC Racing	Chevrolet	1:44.071	87.171
36	24	Butch Gilliland	Gilliland Racing	Pontiac	1:44.323	86.961
37	12	Hut Stricklin	Bobby Allison Motorsports	Chevrolet	1:44.506	86.808
38	37	Rick Carelli	Chesrown Racing	Chevrolet	1:44.942	86.448
39	60	Mike Chase	Kaylan Young Racing	Pontiac	1:45.213	86.225
40	99	John Krebs	Diamond Ridge Motorsports	Pontiac	1:46.172	85.446
Winston Cup provisional
41	41	Greg Sacks	Larry Hedrick Motorsports	Chevrolet	-*	-*
Winston West provisionals
42	51	Rick Scribner	Scribner Racing	Chevrolet	-*	-*
43	44	Jack Sellers	Emerson Racing	Buick	-*	-*
Failed to qualify
44	58	Wayne Jacks	Jacks Motorsports	Pontiac	-*	-*
45	04	Bobby Woods	Lipseia Racing	Pontiac	-*	-*
Official first round qualifying results
Official starting lineup

== Race results ==
Fin	St	#	Driver	Team	Make	Laps	Led	Status	Pts	Winnings
1	2	4	Ernie Irvan	Morgan–McClure Motorsports	Chevrolet	74	8	running	180	$61,810
2	6	94	Terry Labonte	Hagan Racing	Oldsmobile	74	15	running	175	$36,685
3	8	6	Mark Martin	Roush Racing	Ford	74	1	running	170	$28,185
4	1	5	Ricky Rudd	Hendrick Motorsports	Chevrolet	74	9	running	165	$25,710
5	5	11	Bill Elliott	Junior Johnson & Associates	Ford	74	22	running	165	$32,585
6	12	3	Dale Earnhardt	Richard Childress Racing	Chevrolet	74	0	running	150	$21,910
7	3	2	Rusty Wallace	Penske Racing South	Pontiac	74	12	running	151	$18,110
8	4	17	Darrell Waltrip	Darrell Waltrip Motorsports	Chevrolet	74	0	running	142	$18,610
9	13	25	Ken Schrader	Hendrick Motorsports	Chevrolet	74	0	running	138	$17,360
10	15	15	Geoff Bodine	Bud Moore Engineering	Ford	74	0	running	134	$16,360
11	33	1	Rick Mast	Precision Products Racing	Oldsmobile	74	0	running	130	$13,460
12	19	42	Kyle Petty	SABCO Racing	Pontiac	74	0	running	127	$12,960
13	14	52	Tommy Kendall	Jimmy Means Racing	Pontiac	74	0	running	124	$6,755
14	7	7	Alan Kulwicki	AK Racing	Ford	74	5	running	126	$14,255
15	16	26	Brett Bodine	King Racing	Ford	74	0	running	118	$11,905
16	11	22	Sterling Marlin	Junior Johnson & Associates	Ford	74	0	running	115	$11,405
17	24	33	Harry Gant	Leo Jackson Motorsports	Oldsmobile	74	2	running	117	$15,530
18	20	10	Derrike Cope	Whitcomb Racing	Chevrolet	74	0	running	109	$6,345
19	32	75	Bill Sedgwick	Spears Motorsports	Chevrolet	74	0	running	106	$9,080
20	26	30	Michael Waltrip	Bahari Racing	Pontiac	74	0	running	103	$11,155
21	30	43	Richard Petty	Petty Enterprises	Pontiac	74	0	running	100	$11,055
22	31	55	Ted Musgrave	RaDiUs Motorsports	Oldsmobile	73	0	running	97	$10,230
23	27	71	Dave Marcis	Marcis Auto Racing	Chevrolet	73	0	running	94	$7,155
24	34	9	Bill Schmitt	Melling Racing	Ford	73	0	running	91	$8,235
25	9	16	Wally Dallenbach Jr.	Roush Racing	Ford	73	0	running	88	$6,975
26	28	8	Dick Trickle	Stavola Brothers Racing	Ford	73	0	running	85	$9,855
27	37	12	Hut Stricklin	Bobby Allison Motorsports	Chevrolet	73	0	running	82	$9,780
28	10	28	Davey Allison	Robert Yates Racing	Ford	73	0	running	79	$16,305
29	21	21	Morgan Shepherd	Wood Brothers Racing	Ford	72	0	running	76	$9,670
30	22	66	Jimmy Hensley (R)	Cale Yarborough Motorsports	Ford	72	0	running	73	$5,815
31	40	99	John Krebs	Diamond Ridge Motorsports	Pontiac	72	0	running	70	$6,530
32	17	92	Ron Hornaday Jr.	Fisher Racing	Chevrolet	72	0	running	67	$4,930
33	29	09	R. K. Smith	Midgley Racing	Pontiac	70	0	engine	64	$4,880
34	25	68	Bobby Hamilton	TriStar Motorsports	Oldsmobile	70	0	running	61	$10,380
35	39	60	Mike Chase	Kaylan Young Racing	Pontiac	69	0	running	58	$6,330
36	42	51	Rick Scribner	Scribner Racing	Chevrolet	68	0	running	55	$4,820
37	38	37	Rick Carelli	Chesrown Racing	Chevrolet	57	0	rear end	52	$4,800
38	36	24	Butch Gilliland	Gilliland Racing	Pontiac	55	0	handling	49	$4,780
39	23	18	Dale Jarrett	Joe Gibbs Racing	Chevrolet	52	0	transmission	46	$4,750
40	43	44	Jack Sellers	Emerson Racing	Buick	48	0	transmission	43	$4,725
41	18	0	Irv Hoerr	Precision Products Racing	Oldsmobile	42	0	engine	40	$4,725
42	35	50	Hershel McGriff	JTC Racing	Chevrolet	19	0	transmission	37	$4,725
43	41	41	Greg Sacks	Larry Hedrick Motorsports	Chevrolet	2	0	engine	34	$4,725
Failed to qualify
44		58	Wayne Jacks	Jacks Motorsports	Pontiac					
45		04	Bobby Woods	Lipseia Racing	Pontiac					
Official race results

== Standings after the race ==
Drivers' Championship standings

	Pos	Driver	Points
	1	Davey Allison	1,773
1	2	Dale Earnhardt	1,745 (-28)
1	3	Bill Elliott	1,742 (-31)
2	4	Harry Gant	1,741 (–32)
	5	Alan Kulwicki	1,690 (–83)
	6	Terry Labonte	1,658 (–115)
	7	Morgan Shepherd	1,548 (–225)
2	8	Ricky Rudd	1,511 (–262)
	9	Geoff Bodine	1,494 (–279)
3	10	Ernie Irvan	1,488 (–285)
Official driver's standings

- Note: Only the first 10 positions are included for the driver standings.

Previous race: 1992 Budweiser 500	NASCAR Winston Cup Series; 1992 season	Next race: 1992 Champion Spark Plug 500

Previous race: 1992 Alpha Beta 200	NASCAR Winston West Series; 1992 season	Next race: 1992 Holiday Quality Foods 200
