= Rick Scribner =

American racing driver (born 1952)

- Born: February 10, 1952 (age 74); Orangevale, California, U.S.

NASCAR Cup Series career
- 2 races run over 1 year
- Best finish: 72nd (1992)
- First race: 1992 Save Mart 300K (Sonoma)
- Last race: 1992 Pyroil 500K (Phoenix)
Wins	Top tens	Poles
0	0	0

ARCA Menards Series career
- 1 race run over 1 year
- Best finish: N/A (1992)
- First race: 1992 NASCAR / ARCA Texas World Shootout (Texas World)
Wins	Top tens	Poles
0	0	0

ARCA Menards Series West career
- 50 races run over 10 years
- Best finish: 6th (1991, 1993)
- First race: 1989 Bank of Loleta/U.S. Bank 200 (Redwood Acres)
- Last race: 1998 Phoenix 150 (Phoenix)
Wins	Top tens	Poles
0	19	0
- Statistics up to date as of April 9, 2026.

Rick Scribner (born February 10, 1952) is an American former professional stock car racing driver. He primarily competed in the NASCAR Winston West Series, racing in the series between 1989 and 1998.

== Racing career ==
Scribner attempted races in the World of Outlaws Copenhagen/Skoal Shootout in 1985 and 1987, failing to qualify in both attempts.

In 1989, Scribner began competing in the NASCAR Winston West Series, debuting in his self owned No. 15 Chevrolet at Redwood Acres Speedway, where he finished fifteenth due to a crash. He returned at Mesa Marin Raceway, finishing fourteenth after retiring with engine issues. He then drove the No. 41 for Sara Vincent at Sears Point International Raceway, finishing twelfth. He attempted the season finale, a combination race with the NASCAR Winston Cup Series, but failed to qualify.

Scribner returned to the West Series in 1990, running at Evergreen Speedway and all the remainder of the schedule afterward. He again failed to qualify at Phoenix, but scored his first top-ten, a ninth-place result at Mesa Marin.

Scribner began competing full time in 1991, finishing in the top-ten in five of the seven races he qualified for, finishing sixth in the final standings. He failed to qualify for the combination races at Sears Point and Phoenix.

Scribner returned for another full-time season in 1992, this time qualifying for the combination races. He scored the first top-five of his career, coming at Portland Speedway. In his Winston Cup debut, Scribner finished in 36th in the 43 car field. At Phoenix, he finished in 41st after retiring from the event only seven laps in with engine issues. Scribner ended the season seventh in the standings.

Scribner attempted twelve of the fourteen races in 1993, scoring a career best fourth-place finish at Tucson Speedway, along with five other top-ten results. He failed to qualify for the combination races, but tied his career best points finish of sixth.

Scribner scaled back in 1994, only competing in six races and failing to finish all of them due to crashes or mechanical issues.

Scribner only made one start in 1995, finishing twentieth at Tucson after retiring with engine issues.

Scribner competed in two races in 1996, scoring a top ten at Altamont Motorsports Park.

In four starts in 1997, Scribner scored one top-five, ultimately the final top-five and final top-ten of his career. He also attempted the Cup race at Sonoma, failing to qualify.

Scribner's final Winston West appearances came in 1998, where he failed to qualify for the season opener at Tucson before running the following two races, his final start coming at Phoenix where he finished twelfth.

In 2019, Scribner made fourteen starts in the NASCAR Whelen All-American Series at All American Speedway, scoring six top tens and finishing nineteenth in the regional standings.

Scribner made ten starts in the renamed NASCAR Advance Auto Parts Weekly Series at the track in 2021, scoring eight top tens and finishing sixteenth in the standings.

Scribner made a start in the Wild West Super Series presented by JM Environmental in 2023, finishing sixth.

== Personal life ==
Scribner has a wife and a son. He runs Scribner Plastics, which he founded in 1978, with his son, Chris. Transmission containers produced by the company are used by several OEMs, including Subaru, Toyota, General Motors, and Chrysler, the latter of which gave him an Environmental Excellence Award in 1986. The company appeared as a sponsor on his West Series car in 1997 and 1998. Rick and Chris both compete in racing when not busy working at the company.

== Motorsports career results ==
=== NASCAR ===
(key) (Bold – Pole position awarded by qualifying time. Italics – Pole position earned by points standings or practice time. * – Most laps led.)

==== Winston Cup Series ====
NASCAR Winston Cup Series results
Year	Team	No.	Make	1	2	3	4	5	6	7	8	9	10	11	12	13	14	15	16	17	18	19	20	21	22	23	24	25	26	27	28	29	30	31	32	NWCSC	Pts	Ref
1989	Scribner Racing	50	Chevy	DAY	CAR	ATL	RCH	DAR	BRI	NWS	MAR	TAL	CLT	DOV	SON	POC	MCH	DAY	POC	TAL	GLN	MCH	BRI	DAR	RCH	DOV	MAR	CLT	NWS	CAR	PHO; DNQ	ATL				131st	0	
1990	Scribner Racing	61	Chevy	DAY	RCH	CAR	ATL	DAR	BRI	NWS	MAR	TAL	CLT	DOV	SON	POC	MCH	DAY	POC	TAL	GLN	MCH	BRI	DAR	RCH	DOV	MAR	NWS	CLT	CAR	PHO; DNQ	ATL				127th	0	
1991	Scribner Racing	15	Chevy	DAY	RCH	CAR	ATL	DAR	BRI	NWS	MAR	TAL	CLT	DOV	SON	POC	MCH	DAY	POC	TAL	GLN	MCH	BRI	DAR	RCH	DOV	MAR	NWS	CLT	CAR	PHO; DNQ	ATL				117th	0	
1992	Scribner Racing	51	Chevy	DAY	CAR	RCH	ATL	DAR	BRI	NWS	MAR	TAL	CLT	DOV	SON; 36	POC	MCH	DAY	POC	TAL	GLN	MCH	BRI	DAR	RCH	DOV	MAR	NWS	CLT	CAR						72nd	95	
1992	Scribner Racing	61	Chevy																												PHO; 41	ATL				72nd	95	
1993	Scribner Racing	51	Chevy	DAY	CAR	RCH	ATL	DAR	BRI	NWS	MAR	TAL	SON; DNQ	CLT	DOV	POC	MCH	DAY	NHA	POC	TAL	GLN	MCH	BRI	DAR	RCH	DOV	MAR	NWS	CLT	CAR	PHO; DNQ	ATL			108th	0	
1997	Scribner Engineering	15W	Chevy	DAY	CAR	RCH	ATL	DAR	TEX	BRI	MAR	SON; DNQ	TAL	CLT	DOV	POC	MCH	CAL	DAY	NHA	POC	IND	GLN	MCH	BRI	DAR	RCH	NHA	DOV	MAR	CLT	TAL	CAR	PHO	ATL	84th	0	

==== Winston West Series ====
NASCAR Winston West Series results
Year	Team	No.	Make	1	2	3	4	5	6	7	8	9	10	11	12	13	14	15	NWWSC	Pts	Ref
1989	Scribner Racing	15	Chevy	MAD	MMR	RAS; 15	SON	POR	TCR	EVG	MMR; 14	SGS							22nd	475	
1989	Sara Vincent	41	Chevy										SON; 12						22nd	475	
1989	Scribner Racing	50	Chevy											PHO; DNQ					22nd	475	
1990	Scribner Racing	15	Chevy	MMR	SON	SGS	POR	EVG; 11	RAS; 11	TCR; 13	MMR; 9								17th	640	
1990	Scribner Racing	16	Chevy									PHO; DNQ							17th	640	
1991	Scribner Racing	15	Chevy	EVG; 7	MMR; 10		SGS; 10	POR; 11	EVG; 7	SSS; 11	MMR; 7	PHO; DNQ							6th	1211	
1991	Scribner Racing	16	Chevy			SON; DNQ													6th	1211	
1992	Scribner Racing	15	Chevy	MMR; 7	SGS; 6		SHA; 9	POR; 5	EVG; 12	SSS; 7	CAJ; 11	TWS; 17	MMR; 24						7th	1517	
1992	Scribner Racing	51	Chevy			SON; 36													7th	1517	
1992	Scribner Racing	61	Chevy											PHO; 41					7th	1517	
1993	Scribner Racing	15	Chevy	TWS	MMR; 12	SGS		TUS; 4	SHA; 8	EVG; 6	POR; 15	CBS; 6	SSS; 6	CAJ; 12	TCR; 11	MMR; 6			6th	1676	
1993	Scribner Racing	51	Chevy				SON; DNQ										PHO; DNQ		6th	1676	
1994	Scribner Racing	15	Chevy	MMR; 22	TUS; 21	SON	SGS; 15	YAK	MMR	POR	IND	CAJ; 13	TCR	LVS	MMR; 21	PHO			23rd	636	
1994	Scribner Engineering	15	Chevy														TUS; 22		23rd	636	
1995	Scribner Engineering	15	Chevy	TUS; 20	MMR	SON	CNS	MMR	POR	SGS	TUS	AMP	MAD	POR	LVS	SON	MMR	PHO	53rd	103	
1996	Scribner Engineering	15	Chevy	TUS	AMP; 8	MMR	SON	MAD	POR	TUS	EVG	CNS	MAD	MMR	SON; 13	MMR	PHO	LVS	35th	266	
1997	Scribner Engineering	15	Chevy	TUS	AMP	SON	TUS	MMR; 17	LVS	CAL	EVG	POR	PPR	AMP; 5	SON; 13	MMR; 11	LVS		25th	521	
1998	Scribner Engineering	15	Chevy	TUS; DNQ	LVS; 11	PHO; 12	CAL	HPT	MMR	AMP	POR	CAL	PPR	EVG	SON	MMR	LVS		39th	339	

=== ARCA SuperCar Series ===
ARCA SuperCar Series results
Year	Team	No.	Make	1	2	3	4	5	6	7	8	9	10	11	12	13	14	15	16	17	18	19	20	21	ASCSC	Pts	Ref
1992	Scribner Racing	15W	Chevy	DAY	FIF	TWS	TAL	TOL	KIL	POC	MCH	FRS	KIL	NSV	DEL	POC	HPT	FRS	ISF	TOL	DSF	TWS; 17	SLM	ATL	NA	NA	
