= Chesrown Racing =

Former American stock car team

- Owner(s): Marshall Chesrown
- Series: NASCAR Winston Cup Series, NASCAR Craftsman Truck Series
- Race drivers: Rick Carelli; Randy Renfrow; Mike Chase
- Manufacturer: Chevrolet
- Opened: 1991
- Closed: 1999

Career
- Debut: Cup Series: 1992 Save Mart 300K (Sears Point); Truck Series: 1995 Skoal Bandit Copper World Classic (Phoenix)
- Latest race: Cup Series: 1994 Slick 50 500 (Phoenix); Truck Series: 1999 Virginia Is For Lovers 200 (Richmond)
- Races competed: Total: 119; Cup Series: 9 Truck Series: 110
- Drivers' Championships: Total: 0 Cup Series: 0 Truck Series: 0
- Race victories: Total: 3 Cup Series: 0 Truck Series: 3
- Pole positions: Total: 0 Cup Series: 0 Truck Series: 0

Chesrown Racing is a former American stock car racing team that ran from 1991 to 1999. It was most known for fielding entries in the NASCAR Winston Cup Series and the NASCAR Craftsman Truck Series with sponsorship from RE/MAX in its later years with Carelli as the driver, where they ran from 1991 to 1999. The team closed in the latter year after its assets were purchased by Orleans Racing.

Chesrown was inducted in the West Coast Stock Car/Motorsports Hall of Fame in 2014.

== Motorsports results ==
=== Winston Cup ===
==== Car No. 37/61 results ====
Year	Driver	No.	Make	1	2	3	4	5	6	7	8	9	10	11	12	13	14	15	16	17	18	19	20	21	22	23	24	25	26	27	28	29	30	31	Owners	Pts	Ref
1991	Rick Carelli	37	Chevy	DAY	RCH	CAR	ATL	DAR	BRI	NWS	MAR	TAL	CLT	DOV	SON	POC	MCH	DAY	POC	TAL	GLN	MCH	BRI	DAR	RCH	DOV	MAR	NWS	CLT	CAR	PHO; DNQ	ATL			NA	-	
1992	Rick Carelli	37	Chevy	DAY	CAR	RCH	ATL	DAR	BRI	NWS	MAR	TAL	CLT	DOV	SON; 37	POC	MCH	DAY	POC	TAL	GLN	MCH	BRI	DAR	RCH	DOV	MAR	NWS	CLT	CAR	PHO; 42	ATL			N/A	89	
1993	Rick Carelli	61	Chevy	DAY	CAR	RCH; DNQ	ATL; DNQ	DAR	BRI	NWS	MAR	TAL																				PHO; 21	ATL; 35		N/A	258	
1993	Rick Carelli	37	Chevy										SON; 21	CLT	DOV	POC	MCH	DAY	NHA	POC	TAL	GLN	MCH	BRI	DAR	RCH	DOV	MAR	NWS	CLT	CAR				N/A	258	
1994	Rick Carelli	61	Chevy	DAY; DNQ	CAR; DNQ	RCH; DNQ	ATL; DNQ	DAR; DNQ	BRI	NWS	MAR	TAL	SON; 41	CLT	DOV	POC	MCH; DNQ	DAY	NHA	POC	TAL	IND; DNQ	GLN	MCH; 27	BRI	DAR; DNQ	RCH	DOV	MAR	NWS	CLT	CAR; 22	PHO; 33	ATL; DNQ	N/A	283	

=== Craftsman Truck Series ===
==== Truck No. 6 results ====
Year	Driver	No.	Make	1	2	3	4	5	6	7	8	9	10	11	12	13	14	15	16	17	18	19	20	21	22	23	24	25	26	27	Owners	Pts	Ref
1995	Rick Carelli	6	Chevy	PHO; 24	TUS; 3	SGS; 9	MMR; 12	POR; 8	EVG; 8	I70; 6	LVL; 5	BRI; 23	MLW; 4	CNS; 7	HPT; 11	IRP; 3	FLM; 2	RCH; 12	MAR; 29	NWS; 12	SON; 15	MMR; 11	PHO; 11								6th	2683	
1996	Rick Carelli	6	Chevy	HOM; 16	PHO; 6	POR; 6	EVG; 13	TUS; 23	CNS; 19	HPT; 24	BRI; 1	NZH; 16	MLW; 11	LVL; 7	I70; 3	IRP; 18	FLM; 7	GLN; 24	NSV; 9	RCH; 15	NHA; 13	MAR; 29	NWS; 6	SON; 9	MMR; 34	PHO; 16	LVS; 14				10th	2953	
1997	Rick Carelli	6	Chevy	WDW; 5	TUS; 30	HOM; 8	PHO; 10	POR; 28	EVG; 19	I70; 7	NHA; 3	TEX; 22	BRI; 4	NZH; 6	MLW; 5	LVL; 19	CNS; 7	HPT; 9	IRP; 8	FLM; 5	NSV; 10	GLN; 10	RCH; 11	MAR; 15	SON; 7	MMR; 12	CAL; 15	PHO; 5	LVS; 6		7th	3461	
1998	Rick Carelli	6	Chevy	WDW; 3	HOM; 18	PHO; 17	POR; 3	EVG; 7	I70; 32	GLN; 28	TEX; 9	BRI; 30	MLW; 6	NZH; 9	CAL; 16	PPR; 4	IRP; 17	NHA; 20	FLM; 16	NSV; 17	HPT; 30	LVL; 31	RCH; 8	MEM; 30	GTY; 1^{*}	MAR; 11	SON; 11	MMR; 6	PHO; 11	LVS; 35	11th	3195	
1999	Rick Carelli	6	Chevy	HOM; 10	PHO; 27	EVG; 6	MMR; 1	MAR; 9	MEM; 36																						N/A	N/A	
1999	Randy Renfrow	6	Chevy							PPR; 22	I70; 15	BRI; 27	TEX; DNQ	PIR	GLN	MLW	NSV	NZH	MCH	NHA	IRP	GTY	HPT								N/A	N/A	
1999	Bruce Driver	6	Chevy																					RCH; 27	LVS	LVL	TEX	CAL			N/A	N/A	
