= Rich Woodland Jr. =

American racing driver (born 1970)

- Born: August 5, 1970 (age 56); Templeton, California, U.S.

NASCAR Cup Series career
- 2 races run over 2 years
- Best finish: 63rd (1996)
- First race: 1993 Slick 50 500 (Phoenix)
- Last race: 1996 Save Mart Supermarkets 300 (Sonoma)
Wins	Top tens	Poles
0	0	0

NASCAR FedEx Freight Truck Series career
- 9 races run over 3 years
- Best finish: 56th (2000)
- First race: 1999 NAPA Auto Parts 200 (California)
- Last race: 2001 Silverado 350K (Texas)
Wins	Top tens	Poles
0	0	0

Rich Woodland Jr. (born August 5, 1970) is an American former stock car racing driver. He competed in the NASCAR Winston West Series in the mid 1990s, and also made two starts in NASCAR's premier Winston Cup Series.

== Career ==
Born in Templeton, California, Woodland made his debut in NASCAR competition in the Winston West Series in 1992; he posted three top-ten finishes in six starts in his first year. After two partial seasons in 1993 and 1994, Woodland ran two full years in the series, with a best points finish of fifth in 1995.

Woodland also competed in NASCAR's Winston Cup Series; the series ran combination races between Winston Cup and Winston West at Sears Point Raceway, Phoenix International Raceway, and Indianapolis Motor Speedway (in 1994 only). Woodland successfully qualified for races at Phoenix in 1993 and Sears Point in 1996; his best finish came in the latter event, where he finished 37th of 44 cars in the race. Woodland also attempted but failed to qualify for six other combination races; in 1994 at Sears Point, he was involved in a spectacular practice crash, launching his Oldsmobile off the track and destroying it.

Starting with the 1997 season, Woodland shifted his focus from the Winston West Series to the ARCA Racing Series; he would run partial ARCA schedules between 1997 and 2004, with a best finish of fifth at Pikes Peak International Raceway and Pocono Raceway in 1998. Woodland also continued to run selected Winston West races in 1997 and 1998, and in the latter year posted his only Winston West Series win, at Phoenix International Raceway. Woodland started 21st in the event, setting a record for most spots gained in a West Series race to win at the track. As a result of his win, Woodland was selected by NASCAR to compete in the Coca-Cola 500 Winston Cup exhibition race at Twin Ring Motegi in 1998; Woodland finished 31st in the event.

Between 1999 and 2001, Woodland competed in selected NASCAR Craftsman Truck Series races. His best finish in nine races was fourteenth, at Daytona International Speedway in 2000. Woodland also attempted but failed to qualify for two NASCAR Busch Series races in 2001.

== Motorsports career results ==
=== NASCAR ===
(key) (Bold – Pole position awarded by qualifying time. Italics – Pole position earned by points standings or practice time. * – Most laps led.)

==== Winston Cup Series ====
NASCAR Winston Cup Series results
Year	Team	No.	Make	1	2	3	4	5	6	7	8	9	10	11	12	13	14	15	16	17	18	19	20	21	22	23	24	25	26	27	28	29	30	31	NWCC	Pts	Ref
1992	Woodland Racing	86	Olds	DAY	CAR	RCH	ATL	DAR	BRI	NWS	MAR	TAL	CLT	DOV	SON	POC	MCH	DAY	POC	TAL	GLN	MCH	BRI	DAR	RCH	DOV	MAR	NWS	CLT	CAR	PHO; DNQ	ATL			N/A	-	
1993	Woodland Racing	86	Olds	DAY	CAR	RCH	ATL	DAR	BRI	NWS	MAR	TAL	SON	CLT	DOV	POC	MCH	DAY	NHA	POC	TAL	GLN	MCH	BRI	DAR	RCH	DOV	MAR	NWS	CLT	CAR	PHO; 38	ATL		85th	49	
1994	Gilliland Racing	86W	Chevy	DAY	CAR	RCH	ATL	DAR	BRI	NWS	MAR	TAL	SON; DNQ	CLT	DOV	POC	MCH	DAY	NHA	POC	TAL														N/A	-	
1994	Gilliland Racing	36W	Chevy																			IND; DNQ	GLN	MCH	BRI	DAR	RCH	DOV	MAR	NWS	CLT	CAR			N/A	-	
1994	Woodland Racing	86W	Chevy																														PHO; DNQ	ATL	N/A	-	
1995	Gilliland Racing	36W	Chevy	DAY	CAR	RCH	ATL	DAR	BRI	NWS	MAR	TAL	SON	CLT	DOV	POC	MCH	DAY	NHA	POC	TAL	IND	GLN	MCH	BRI	DAR	RCH	DOV	MAR	NWS	CLT	CAR	PHO; DNQ	ATL	N/A	-	
1996	Bill Stroppe Motorsports	38	Chevy	DAY	CAR	RCH	ATL	DAR	BRI	NWS	MAR	TAL	SON; 37	CLT	DOV	POC	MCH	DAY	NHA	POC	TAL	IND	GLN	MCH	BRI	DAR	RCH	DOV	MAR	NWS	CLT	CAR			63rd	52	
1996	Woodland Racing	38	Ford																														PHO; DNQ	ATL	63rd	52	

==== Busch Series ====
NASCAR Busch Series results
Year	Team	No.	Make	1	2	3	4	5	6	7	8	9	10	11	12	13	14	15	16	17	18	19	20	21	22	23	24	25	26	27	28	29	30	31	32	33	NBSC	Pts	Ref
2001	Gerhart Racing	65	Pontiac	DAY	CAR	LVS	ATL	DAR	BRI	TEX	NSH	TAL	CAL	RCH	NHA	NZH	CLT; DNQ	DOV	KEN	MLW	GLN																N/A	-	
2001	Woodland Racing	40	Pontiac																			CHI; DNQ	GTY	PPR	IRP	MCH	BRI	DAR	RCH	DOV	KAN	CLT	MEM	PHO	CAR	HOM	N/A	-	

==== Craftsman Truck Series ====
NASCAR Craftsman Truck Series results
Year	Team	No.	Make	1	2	3	4	5	6	7	8	9	10	11	12	13	14	15	16	17	18	19	20	21	22	23	24	25	NCTC	Pts	Ref
1999	Woodland Racing	6	Chevy	HOM	PHO	EVG	MMR	MAR	MEM	PPR	I70	BRI	TEX	PIR	GLN	MLW	NSV	NZH	MCH	NHA	IRP	GTY	HPT	RCH	LVS	LVL	TEX	CAL; 26	101st	85	
2000	Woodland Racing	6	Chevy	DAY; 14	HOM	PHO	MMR	MAR	PIR	GTY; 30	MEM	PPR	EVG	TEX	KEN	GLN	MLW	NHA	NZH	MCH; 23	IRP	NSV	CIC	RCH	DOV	TEX	CAL; 35		56th	346	
2001	Impact Motorsports	12	Dodge	DAY; 35	HOM	MMR	MAR	GTY	DAR	PPR	DOV																		61st	280	
2001	Ware Racing Enterprises	81	Chevy									TEX; 34	MEM	MLW	KAN	KEN	NHA	IRP	NSH; 22	CIC	NZH	RCH	SBO						61st	280	
2001	Impact Motorsports	86	Chevy																					TEX; 33	LVS	PHO	CAL		61st	280	
