= Wayne Jacks =

American racing driver (born 1949)

- Born: February 21, 1949 (age 77); Las Vegas, Nevada, U.S.

NASCAR Cup Series career
- 1 race run over 7 years
- Best finish: 91st (1993)
- First race: 1993 Slick 50 500 (Phoenix)
Wins	Top tens	Poles
0	0	0

NASCAR FedEx Freight Truck Series career
- 8 races run over 4 years
- Best finish: 38th (1995)
- First race: 1995 Racing Champions 200 (Tucson)
- Last race: 1998 Dodge California Truck Stop 300 (Mesa Marin)
Wins	Top tens	Poles
0	0	0

Wayne Jacks (born February 21, 1949) is an American stock car racing driver. He was a regular in competition in the NASCAR Winston West Series during the 1990s, and has also previously competed in the NASCAR Winston Cup Series and NASCAR Craftsman Truck Series, posting a best finish of fourteenth in Truck competition at Mesa Marin Raceway.

== Career history ==
A native of Las Vegas, and known for competing on a shoestring budget, Jacks was a regular on the NASCAR Winston West Series, competing in 84 races between 1991 and 2003 with a best finish of third, which he achieved six times; he finished fourth in series points in 1993, his best season result. Jacks attempted eleven Winston Cup Series events, run as combination races with the Winston West Series, between 1991 and 1997; he failed to qualify for ten, including the inaugural Brickyard 400. His sole start in NASCAR's top division came in the 1993 Slick 50 500 at Phoenix International Raceway, where he finished 41st of 43 cars, completing 48 of 312 laps before retiring with an engine failure.

Jacks also competed on a part-time basis in the NASCAR Craftsman Truck Series between 1995 and 1998; in seven series starts, he posted a best finish of fourteenth at Mesa Marin Raceway in 1995. He was best known for rolling his truck at Portland Speedway during a race in 1995. He attempted to qualify for a single Busch Series race, at Las Vegas Motor Speedway in 2003, but failed to make the race.

Following his NASCAR career, Jacks continued to compete in local competition at The Bullring at Las Vegas Motor Speedway, competing in both super late models and Legends cars.

== Motorsports career results ==
=== NASCAR ===
(key) (Bold – Pole position awarded by qualifying time. Italics – Pole position earned by points standings or practice time. * – Most laps led.)

==== Winston Cup Series ====
NASCAR Winston Cup Series results
Year	Team	No.	Make	1	2	3	4	5	6	7	8	9	10	11	12	13	14	15	16	17	18	19	20	21	22	23	24	25	26	27	28	29	30	31	32	NWCC	Pts	Ref
1991	Jacks Motorsports	58	Olds	DAY	RCH	CAR	ATL	DAR	BRI	NWS	MAR	TAL	CLT	DOV	SON	POC	MCH	DAY	POC	TAL	GLN	MCH	BRI	DAR	RCH	DOV	MAR	NWS	CLT	CAR	PHO; DNQ	ATL				NA	0	
1992	Jacks Motorsports	58	Pontiac	DAY	CAR	RCH	ATL	DAR	BRI	NWS	MAR	TAL	CLT	DOV	SON; DNQ	POC	MCH	DAY	POC	TAL	GLN	MCH	BRI	DAR	RCH	DOV	MAR	NWS	CLT	CAR	PHO; DNQ	ATL				NA	0	
1993	Jacks Motorsports	58	Pontiac	DAY	CAR	RCH	ATL	DAR	BRI	NWS	MAR	TAL	SON; DNQ	CLT	DOV	POC	MCH	DAY	NHA	POC	TAL	GLN	MCH	BRI	DAR	RCH	DOV	MAR	NWS	CLT	CAR	PHO; 41	ATL			91st	40	
1994	Jacks Motorsports	58	Pontiac	DAY	CAR	RCH	ATL	DAR	BRI	NWS	MAR	TAL	SON; DNQ	CLT	DOV	POC	MCH	DAY	NHA	POC	TAL	IND; DNQ	GLN	MCH	BRI	DAR	RCH	DOV	MAR	NWS	CLT	CAR	PHO; DNQ	ATL		NA	0	
1995	Jacks Motorsports	58	Pontiac	DAY	CAR	RCH	ATL	DAR	BRI	NWS	MAR	TAL	SON	CLT	DOV	POC	MCH	DAY	NHA	POC	TAL	IND	GLN	MCH	BRI	DAR	RCH	DOV	MAR	NWS	CLT	CAR	PHO; DNQ	ATL		NA	0	
1996	Jacks Motorsports	58	Pontiac	DAY	CAR	RCH	ATL	DAR	BRI	NWS	MAR	TAL	SON; DNQ	CLT	DOV	POC	MCH	DAY	NHA	POC	TAL	IND	GLN	MCH	BRI	DAR	RCH	DOV	MAR	NWS	CLT	CAR	PHO	ATL		NA	0	
1997	Jacks Motorsports	89	Pontiac	DAY	CAR	RCH	ATL	DAR	TEX	BRI	MAR	SON; DNQ	TAL	CLT	DOV	POC	MCH	CAL	DAY	NHA	POC	IND	GLN	MCH	BRI	DAR	RCH	NHA	DOV	MAR	CLT	TAL	CAR	PHO	ATL	NA	0	

==== Busch Series ====
NASCAR Busch Series results
Year	Team	No.	Make	1	2	3	4	5	6	7	8	9	10	11	12	13	14	15	16	17	18	19	20	21	22	23	24	25	26	27	28	29	30	31	32	33	34	NBSC	Pts	Ref
2003	Means Racing	52	Ford	DAY	CAR	LVS; DNQ	DAR	BRI	TEX	TAL	NSH	CAL	RCH	GTY	NZH	CLT	DOV	NSH	KEN	MLW	DAY	CHI	NHA	PPR	IRP	MCH	BRI	DAR	RCH	DOV	KAN	CLT	MEM	ATL	PHO	CAR	HOM	NA	0	

==== Craftsman Truck Series ====
NASCAR Craftsman Truck Series results
Year	Team	No.	Make	1	2	3	4	5	6	7	8	9	10	11	12	13	14	15	16	17	18	19	20	21	22	23	24	25	26	27	NCTC	Pts	Ref
1995	Jacks Motorsports	58	Chevy	PHO	TUS; 29	SGS	MMR; 22	POR; 20	EVG	I70	LVL	BRI	MLW	CNS	HPT	IRP	FLM	RCH	MAR	NWS	SON; 18	MMR; 14	PHO								38th	506	
1996	Jacks Motorsports	58	Chevy	HOM	PHO; 17	POR	EVG	TUS	CNS; DNQ	HPT	BRI	NZH	MLW	LVL	I70	IRP	FLM	GLN	NSV	RCH	NHA	MAR	NWS	SON; 34	MMR	PHO	LVS				72nd	234	
1997	Jacks Motorsports	58	Chevy	WDW	TUS	HOM	PHO	POR	EVG	I70	NHA	TEX	BRI	NZH	MLW	LVL	CNS	HPT	IRP	FLM	NSV	GLN	RCH	MAR	SON	MMR	CAL	PHO	LVS; DNQ		166th		
1998	Jacks Motorsports	58	Chevy	WDW	HOM	PHO	POR	EVG	I70	GLN	TEX	BRI	MLW	NZH	CAL	PPR	IRP	NHA	FLM	NSV	HPT	LVL	RCH	MEM	GTY	MAR	SON	MMR; 30	PHO	LVS	102nd	73	
