= 1993 Miller Genuine Draft 400 (Richmond) =

23rd race of the 1993 NASCAR Winston Cup Series

Race details
- Race 23 of 30 in the 1993 NASCAR Winston Cup Series
- The 1993 Miller Genuine Draft 400 program cover, featuring Rusty Wallace. Artwork by NASCAR artist Sam Bass.
- Date: September 11, 1993
- Official name: 36th Annual Miller Genuine Draft 400
- Location: Richmond, Virginia, Richmond International Raceway
- Course: Permanent racing facility
- Course length: 0.75 miles (1.21 km)
- Distance: 400 laps, 300 mi (482.803 km)
- Scheduled distance: 400 laps, 300 mi (482.803 km)
- Average speed: 99.917 miles per hour (160.801 km/h)
- Attendance: 75,000

Pole position
Driver	Bobby Labonte	Bill Davis Racing
- Time: 22.130

Most laps led
Driver	Rusty Wallace	Penske Racing South
- Laps: 206

Winner
No. 2	Rusty Wallace	Penske Racing South

Television in the United States
- Network: TBS
- Announcers: Ken Squier, Neil Bonnett

Radio in the United States
- Radio: Motor Racing Network

The 1993 Miller Genuine Draft 400 was the 23rd stock car race of the 1993 NASCAR Winston Cup Series season and the 36th iteration of the event. The race was held on Saturday, September 11, 1993, before an audience of 75,000 in Richmond, Virginia, at Richmond International Raceway, a 0.75 miles (1.21 km) D-shaped oval. The race took the scheduled 400 laps to complete. At race's end, Penske Racing South driver Rusty Wallace would manage to dominate the late stages of the race to take his 27th career NASCAR Winston Cup Series victory and his sixth victory of the season. To fill out the top three, Junior Johnson & Associates driver Bill Elliott and Richard Childress Racing driver Dale Earnhardt would finish second and third, respectively.

== Background ==
The layout of Richmond International Raceway, the venue where the race was at.

Richmond International Raceway (RIR) is a 3/4-mile (1.2 km), D-shaped, asphalt race track located just outside Richmond, Virginia in Henrico County. It hosts the NASCAR Cup Series and Truck Series. Known as "America's premier short track", it formerly hosted a NASCAR Xfinity Series race, an IndyCar Series race, and two USAC sprint car races.

=== Entry list ===
- (R) denotes rookie driver.

#	Driver	Team	Make
1	Rick Mast	Precision Products Racing	Ford
2	Rusty Wallace	Penske Racing South	Pontiac
02	T. W. Taylor	Taylor Racing	Ford
3	Dale Earnhardt	Richard Childress Racing	Chevrolet
4	Jeff Purvis	Morgan–McClure Motorsports	Chevrolet
5	Ricky Rudd	Hendrick Motorsports	Chevrolet
6	Mark Martin	Roush Racing	Ford
7	Jimmy Hensley	AK Racing	Ford
8	Sterling Marlin	Stavola Brothers Racing	Ford
11	Bill Elliott	Junior Johnson & Associates	Ford
12	Jimmy Spencer	Bobby Allison Motorsports	Ford
14	Terry Labonte	Hagan Racing	Chevrolet
15	Geoff Bodine	Bud Moore Engineering	Ford
16	Wally Dallenbach Jr.	Roush Racing	Ford
17	Darrell Waltrip	Darrell Waltrip Motorsports	Chevrolet
18	Dale Jarrett	Joe Gibbs Racing	Chevrolet
21	Morgan Shepherd	Wood Brothers Racing	Ford
22	Bobby Labonte (R)	Bill Davis Racing	Ford
24	Jeff Gordon (R)	Hendrick Motorsports	Chevrolet
25	Ken Schrader	Hendrick Motorsports	Chevrolet
26	Brett Bodine	King Racing	Ford
27	Hut Stricklin	Junior Johnson & Associates	Ford
28	Ernie Irvan	Robert Yates Racing	Ford
30	Michael Waltrip	Bahari Racing	Pontiac
33	Harry Gant	Leo Jackson Motorsports	Chevrolet
39	Dick Trickle	Roulo Brothers Racing	Chevrolet
40	Kenny Wallace (R)	SABCO Racing	Pontiac
41	Phil Parsons	Larry Hedrick Motorsports	Chevrolet
42	Kyle Petty	SABCO Racing	Pontiac
44	Rick Wilson	Petty Enterprises	Pontiac
45	Rich Bickle	Terminal Trucking Motorsports	Ford
52	Jimmy Means	Jimmy Means Racing	Ford
53	Ritchie Petty	Petty Brothers Racing	Ford
55	Ted Musgrave	RaDiUs Motorsports	Ford
68	Greg Sacks	TriStar Motorsports	Ford
71	Dave Marcis	Marcis Auto Racing	Chevrolet
75	Todd Bodine (R)	Butch Mock Motorsports	Ford
80	Jimmy Horton	Hover Motorsports	Ford
90	Bobby Hillin Jr.	Donlavey Racing	Ford
98	Derrike Cope	Cale Yarborough Motorsports	Ford

== Qualifying ==
Qualifying was split into two rounds. The first round was held on Friday, September 10, at 5:30 PM EST. Each driver would have one lap to set a time. During the first round, the top 20 drivers in the round would be guaranteed a starting spot in the race. If a driver was not able to guarantee a spot in the first round, they had the option to scrub their time from the first round and try and run a faster lap time in a second round qualifying run, held on Saturday, September 11, at 3:00 PM EST. As with the first round, each driver would have one lap to set a time. For this specific race, positions 21-34 would be decided on time, and depending on who needed it, a select amount of positions were given to cars who had not otherwise qualified but were high enough in owner's points; up to two were given. If needed, a past champion who did not qualify on either time or provisionals could use a champion's provisional, adding one more spot to the field.

Bobby Labonte, driving for Bill Davis Racing, won the pole, setting a time of 22.130 and an average speed of 122.006 mph (196.350 km/h) in the first round.

Four drivers would fail to qualify.

=== Full qualifying results ===
Pos.	#	Driver	Team	Make	Time	Speed
1	22	Bobby Labonte (R)	Bill Davis Racing	Ford	22.130	122.006
2	28	Ernie Irvan	Robert Yates Racing	Ford	22.173	121.770
3	2	Rusty Wallace	Penske Racing South	Pontiac	22.265	121.267
4	17	Darrell Waltrip	Darrell Waltrip Motorsports	Chevrolet	22.291	121.125
5	33	Harry Gant	Leo Jackson Motorsports	Chevrolet	22.311	121.017
6	1	Rick Mast	Precision Products Racing	Ford	22.313	121.006
7	15	Geoff Bodine	Bud Moore Engineering	Ford	22.323	120.951
8	3	Dale Earnhardt	Richard Childress Racing	Chevrolet	22.336	120.881
9	39	Dick Trickle	Roulo Brothers Racing	Chevrolet	22.343	120.843
10	6	Mark Martin	Roush Racing	Ford	22.350	120.805
11	42	Kyle Petty	SABCO Racing	Pontiac	22.359	120.757
12	25	Ken Schrader	Hendrick Motorsports	Chevrolet	22.376	120.665
13	18	Dale Jarrett	Joe Gibbs Racing	Chevrolet	22.382	120.633
14	98	Derrike Cope	Cale Yarborough Motorsports	Ford	22.382	120.633
15	30	Michael Waltrip	Bahari Racing	Pontiac	22.387	120.606
16	26	Brett Bodine	King Racing	Ford	22.388	120.600
17	5	Ricky Rudd	Hendrick Motorsports	Chevrolet	22.390	120.590
18	4	Jeff Purvis	Morgan–McClure Motorsports	Chevrolet	22.400	120.536
19	7	Jimmy Hensley	AK Racing	Ford	22.401	120.530
20	44	Rick Wilson	Petty Enterprises	Pontiac	22.417	120.444
Failed to lock in Round 1
21	12	Jimmy Spencer	Bobby Allison Motorsports	Ford	22.442	120.310
22	24	Jeff Gordon (R)	Hendrick Motorsports	Chevrolet	22.444	120.299
23	14	Terry Labonte	Hagan Racing	Chevrolet	22.459	120.219
24	8	Sterling Marlin	Stavola Brothers Racing	Ford	22.473	120.144
25	27	Hut Stricklin	Junior Johnson & Associates	Ford	22.533	119.824
26	11	Bill Elliott	Junior Johnson & Associates	Ford	22.545	119.760
27	41	Phil Parsons	Larry Hedrick Motorsports	Chevrolet	22.557	119.697
28	40	Kenny Wallace (R)	SABCO Racing	Pontiac	22.572	119.617
29	21	Morgan Shepherd	Wood Brothers Racing	Ford	22.609	119.421
30	16	Wally Dallenbach Jr.	Roush Racing	Ford	22.638	119.268
31	52	Jimmy Means	Jimmy Means Racing	Ford	22.654	119.184
32	75	Todd Bodine (R)	Butch Mock Motorsports	Ford	22.655	119.179
33	71	Dave Marcis	Marcis Auto Racing	Chevrolet	22.692	118.985
34	90	Bobby Hillin Jr.	Donlavey Racing	Ford	22.696	118.964
Provisionals
35	55	Ted Musgrave	RaDiUs Motorsports	Ford	-*	-*
36	68	Greg Sacks	TriStar Motorsports	Ford	-*	-*
Failed to qualify
37	80	Jimmy Horton	Hover Motorsports	Ford	-*	-*
38	45	Rich Bickle	Terminal Trucking Motorsports	Ford	-*	-*
39	53	Ritchie Petty	Petty Brothers Racing	Ford	-*	-*
40	02	T. W. Taylor	Taylor Racing	Ford	-*	-*
Official first round qualifying results
Official starting lineup

== Race results ==
Fin	St	#	Driver	Team	Make	Laps	Led	Status	Pts	Winnings
1	3	2	Rusty Wallace	Penske Racing South	Pontiac	400	206	running	185	$49,415
2	26	11	Bill Elliott	Junior Johnson & Associates	Ford	400	3	running	175	$54,665
3	8	3	Dale Earnhardt	Richard Childress Racing	Chevrolet	400	0	running	165	$35,780
4	17	5	Ricky Rudd	Hendrick Motorsports	Chevrolet	400	0	running	160	$26,505
5	16	26	Brett Bodine	King Racing	Ford	400	0	running	155	$21,580
6	10	6	Mark Martin	Roush Racing	Ford	400	155	running	155	$21,105
7	4	17	Darrell Waltrip	Darrell Waltrip Motorsports	Chevrolet	400	16	running	151	$18,505
8	23	14	Terry Labonte	Hagan Racing	Chevrolet	400	0	running	142	$14,405
9	11	42	Kyle Petty	SABCO Racing	Pontiac	400	0	running	138	$16,205
10	22	24	Jeff Gordon (R)	Hendrick Motorsports	Chevrolet	400	0	running	134	$14,205
11	5	33	Harry Gant	Leo Jackson Motorsports	Chevrolet	399	0	running	130	$16,305
12	12	25	Ken Schrader	Hendrick Motorsports	Chevrolet	398	0	running	127	$12,905
13	1	22	Bobby Labonte (R)	Bill Davis Racing	Ford	398	12	running	129	$13,755
14	13	18	Dale Jarrett	Joe Gibbs Racing	Chevrolet	398	0	running	121	$14,955
15	30	16	Wally Dallenbach Jr.	Roush Racing	Ford	398	0	running	118	$12,805
16	18	4	Jeff Purvis	Morgan–McClure Motorsports	Chevrolet	398	0	running	115	$16,380
17	25	27	Hut Stricklin	Junior Johnson & Associates	Ford	398	0	running	112	$11,880
18	6	1	Rick Mast	Precision Products Racing	Ford	398	0	running	109	$11,630
19	15	30	Michael Waltrip	Bahari Racing	Pontiac	397	0	running	106	$11,505
20	27	41	Phil Parsons	Larry Hedrick Motorsports	Chevrolet	397	0	running	103	$8,980
21	19	7	Jimmy Hensley	AK Racing	Ford	397	0	running	100	$15,930
22	35	55	Ted Musgrave	RaDiUs Motorsports	Ford	397	0	running	97	$11,255
23	33	71	Dave Marcis	Marcis Auto Racing	Chevrolet	396	0	running	94	$6,430
24	24	8	Sterling Marlin	Stavola Brothers Racing	Ford	395	0	running	91	$11,055
25	9	39	Dick Trickle	Roulo Brothers Racing	Chevrolet	395	0	running	88	$6,355
26	31	52	Jimmy Means	Jimmy Means Racing	Ford	391	0	running	85	$6,330
27	34	90	Bobby Hillin Jr.	Donlavey Racing	Ford	383	0	crash	82	$6,305
28	14	98	Derrike Cope	Cale Yarborough Motorsports	Ford	350	0	running	79	$10,880
29	20	44	Rick Wilson	Petty Enterprises	Pontiac	303	0	running	76	$7,830
30	29	21	Morgan Shepherd	Wood Brothers Racing	Ford	284	0	running	73	$10,755
31	36	68	Greg Sacks	TriStar Motorsports	Ford	264	0	engine	70	$6,155
32	28	40	Kenny Wallace (R)	SABCO Racing	Pontiac	155	0	engine	67	$7,655
33	32	75	Todd Bodine (R)	Butch Mock Motorsports	Ford	130	0	crash	64	$6,125
34	7	15	Geoff Bodine	Bud Moore Engineering	Ford	119	0	head gasket	61	$14,105
35	21	12	Jimmy Spencer	Bobby Allison Motorsports	Ford	80	0	crash	58	$10,605
36	2	28	Ernie Irvan	Robert Yates Racing	Ford	57	8	engine	60	$17,105
Official race results

== Standings after the race ==
Drivers' Championship standings

	Pos	Driver	Points
	1	Dale Earnhardt	3,544
	2	Rusty Wallace	3,260 (-284)
	3	Mark Martin	3,227 (-317)
	4	Dale Jarrett	3,108 (–436)
	5	Morgan Shepherd	3,011 (–533)
	6	Kyle Petty	2,870 (–674)
	7	Ken Schrader	2,851 (–693)
3	8	Bill Elliott	2,780 (–764)
1	9	Jeff Gordon	2,762 (–782)
2	10	Ernie Irvan	2,752 (–792)
Official driver's standings

- Note: Only the first 10 positions are included for the driver standings.

Previous race: 1993 Mountain Dew Southern 500	NASCAR Winston Cup Series; 1993 season	Next race: 1993 SplitFire Spark Plug 500
