= 1993 Goody's 500 =

25th race of the 1993 NASCAR Winston Cup Series

Race details
- Race 25 of 30 in the 1993 NASCAR Winston Cup Series
- The 1993 Goody's 500 program cover.
- Date: September 26, 1993
- Official name: 45th Annual Goody's 500
- Location: Ridgeway, Virginia, Martinsville Speedway
- Course: Permanent racing facility
- Course length: 0.526 miles (0.847 km)
- Distance: 500 laps, 263 mi (423.257 km)
- Scheduled distance: 500 laps, 263 mi (423.257 km)
- Average speed: 74.102 miles per hour (119.256 km/h)
- Attendance: 56,000

Pole position
Driver	Ernie Irvan	Robert Yates Racing
- Time: 20.453

Most laps led
Driver	Ernie Irvan	Robert Yates Racing
- Laps: 402

Winner
No. 28	Ernie Irvan	Robert Yates Racing

Television in the United States
- Network: ESPN
- Announcers: Bob Jenkins, Ned Jarrett, Benny Parsons

Radio in the United States
- Radio: Motor Racing Network

The 1993 Goody's 500 was the 25th stock car race of the 1993 NASCAR Winston Cup Series season and the 45th iteration of the event. The race was held on Sunday, September 26, 1993, before an audience of 56,000 in Martinsville, Virginia at Martinsville Speedway, a 0.526 miles (0.847 km) permanent oval-shaped short track. The race took the scheduled 500 laps to complete. At race's end, Robert Yates Racing driver Ernie Irvan would manage to dominate the majority of the race to take his eighth career NASCAR Winston Cup Series victory and his second victory of the season. Meanwhile, second-place finisher, Penske Racing South driver Rusty Wallace made a considerable points gain, cutting down on driver's championship leader Dale Earnhardt lead by 99 points, making the points deficit 82 points. To fill out the top three, Bobby Allison Motorsports driver Jimmy Spencer would finish third.

== Background ==
The layout of Martinsville Speedway, the venue where the race was held.

Martinsville Speedway is a NASCAR-owned stock car racing track located in Henry County, in Ridgeway, Virginia, just to the south of Martinsville. At 0.526 miles (0.847 km) in length, it is the shortest track in NASCAR. The track was also one of the first paved oval tracks in NASCAR, being built in 1947 by H. Clay Earles. It is also the only remaining race track that has been on the NASCAR circuit from its beginning in 1948.

=== Entry list ===
- (R) denotes rookie driver.

#	Driver	Team	Make
1	Rick Mast	Precision Products Racing	Ford
2	Rusty Wallace	Penske Racing South	Pontiac
3	Dale Earnhardt	Richard Childress Racing	Chevrolet
4	Jeff Purvis	Morgan–McClure Motorsports	Chevrolet
5	Ricky Rudd	Hendrick Motorsports	Chevrolet
6	Mark Martin	Roush Racing	Ford
7	Geoff Bodine	Geoff Bodine Racing	Ford
8	Sterling Marlin	Stavola Brothers Racing	Ford
11	Bill Elliott	Junior Johnson & Associates	Ford
12	Jimmy Spencer	Bobby Allison Motorsports	Ford
14	Terry Labonte	Hagan Racing	Chevrolet
15	Lake Speed	Bud Moore Engineering	Ford
16	Wally Dallenbach Jr.	Roush Racing	Ford
17	Darrell Waltrip	Darrell Waltrip Motorsports	Chevrolet
18	Dale Jarrett	Joe Gibbs Racing	Chevrolet
21	Morgan Shepherd	Wood Brothers Racing	Ford
22	Bobby Labonte (R)	Bill Davis Racing	Ford
24	Jeff Gordon (R)	Hendrick Motorsports	Chevrolet
25	Ken Schrader	Hendrick Motorsports	Chevrolet
26	Brett Bodine	King Racing	Ford
27	Hut Stricklin	Junior Johnson & Associates	Ford
28	Ernie Irvan	Robert Yates Racing	Ford
30	Michael Waltrip	Bahari Racing	Pontiac
33	Harry Gant	Leo Jackson Motorsports	Chevrolet
40	Kenny Wallace (R)	SABCO Racing	Pontiac
41	Phil Parsons	Larry Hedrick Motorsports	Chevrolet
42	Kyle Petty	SABCO Racing	Pontiac
44	Jimmy Hensley	Petty Enterprises	Pontiac
52	Jimmy Means	Jimmy Means Racing	Ford
55	Ted Musgrave	RaDiUs Motorsports	Ford
68	Greg Sacks	TriStar Motorsports	Ford
71	Dave Marcis	Marcis Auto Racing	Chevrolet
75	Todd Bodine (R)	Butch Mock Motorsports	Ford
90	Bobby Hillin Jr.	Donlavey Racing	Ford
98	Derrike Cope	Cale Yarborough Motorsports	Ford

== Qualifying ==
Qualifying was split into two rounds. The first round was held on Friday, September 24, at 3:00 PM EST. Each driver would have one lap to set a time. During the first round, the top 20 drivers in the round would be guaranteed a starting spot in the race. If a driver was not able to guarantee a spot in the first round, they had the option to scrub their time from the first round and try and run a faster lap time in a second round qualifying run, held on Saturday, September 25, at 12:30 PM EST. As with the first round, each driver would have one lap to set a time. For this specific race, positions 21-32 would be decided on time, and depending on who needed it, a select amount of positions were given to cars who had not otherwise qualified but were high enough in owner's points; up to two provisionals were given. If needed, a past champion who did not qualify on either time or provisionals could use a champion's provisional, adding one more spot to the field.

Ernie Irvan, driving for Robert Yates Racing, won the pole, setting a time of 20.453 and an average speed of 92.583 miles per hour (148.998 km/h) in the first round.

Jimmy Means was the only driver to fail to qualify.

=== Full qualifying results ===
Pos.	#	Driver	Team	Make	Time	Speed
1	28	Ernie Irvan	Robert Yates Racing	Ford	20.453	92.583
2	7	Geoff Bodine	Geoff Bodine Racing	Ford	20.502	92.362
3	8	Sterling Marlin	Stavola Brothers Racing	Ford	20.622	91.824
4	2	Rusty Wallace	Penske Racing South	Pontiac	20.629	91.793
5	42	Kyle Petty	SABCO Racing	Pontiac	20.645	91.722
6	17	Darrell Waltrip	Darrell Waltrip Motorsports	Chevrolet	20.672	91.602
7	3	Dale Earnhardt	Richard Childress Racing	Chevrolet	20.701	91.474
8	44	Jimmy Hensley	Petty Enterprises	Pontiac	20.703	91.465
9	22	Bobby Labonte (R)	Bill Davis Racing	Ford	20.731	91.341
10	75	Todd Bodine (R)	Butch Mock Motorsports	Ford	20.749	91.262
11	21	Morgan Shepherd	Wood Brothers Racing	Ford	20.752	91.249
12	25	Ken Schrader	Hendrick Motorsports	Chevrolet	20.754	91.240
13	1	Rick Mast	Precision Products Racing	Ford	20.756	91.231
14	26	Brett Bodine	King Racing	Ford	20.763	91.201
15	12	Jimmy Spencer	Bobby Allison Motorsports	Ford	20.794	91.065
16	27	Hut Stricklin	Junior Johnson & Associates	Ford	20.795	91.060
17	18	Dale Jarrett	Joe Gibbs Racing	Chevrolet	20.796	91.056
18	98	Derrike Cope	Cale Yarborough Motorsports	Ford	20.809	90.999
19	15	Lake Speed	Bud Moore Engineering	Ford	20.842	90.855
20	5	Ricky Rudd	Hendrick Motorsports	Chevrolet	20.846	90.838
Failed to lock in Round 1
21	6	Mark Martin	Roush Racing	Ford	20.586	91.985
22	11	Bill Elliott	Junior Johnson & Associates	Ford	20.667	91.624
23	40	Kenny Wallace (R)	SABCO Racing	Pontiac	20.727	91.359
24	30	Michael Waltrip	Bahari Racing	Pontiac	20.741	91.297
25	24	Jeff Gordon (R)	Hendrick Motorsports	Chevrolet	20.765	91.192
26	90	Bobby Hillin Jr.	Donlavey Racing	Ford	20.839	90.868
27	33	Harry Gant	Leo Jackson Motorsports	Chevrolet	20.846	90.838
28	55	Ted Musgrave	RaDiUs Motorsports	Ford	20.871	90.729
29	14	Terry Labonte	Hagan Racing	Chevrolet	20.883	90.677
30	4	Jeff Purvis	Morgan–McClure Motorsports	Chevrolet	20.885	90.668
31	16	Wally Dallenbach Jr.	Roush Racing	Ford	20.896	90.620
32	71	Dave Marcis	Marcis Auto Racing	Chevrolet	20.903	90.590
Provisionals
33	41	Phil Parsons	Larry Hedrick Motorsports	Chevrolet	-*	-*
34	68	Greg Sacks	TriStar Motorsports	Ford	-*	-*
Failed to qualify
35	52	Jimmy Means	Jimmy Means Racing	Ford	-*	-*
Official first round qualifying results
Official starting lineup

== Race results ==
Fin	St	#	Driver	Team	Make	Laps	Led	Status	Pts	Winnings
1	1	28	Ernie Irvan	Robert Yates Racing	Ford	500	402	running	185	$75,300
2	4	2	Rusty Wallace	Penske Racing South	Pontiac	500	61	running	175	$31,875
3	15	12	Jimmy Spencer	Bobby Allison Motorsports	Ford	500	5	running	170	$31,000
4	20	5	Ricky Rudd	Hendrick Motorsports	Chevrolet	500	0	running	160	$25,250
5	17	18	Dale Jarrett	Joe Gibbs Racing	Chevrolet	499	0	running	155	$22,675
6	14	26	Brett Bodine	King Racing	Ford	499	0	running	150	$18,425
7	29	14	Terry Labonte	Hagan Racing	Chevrolet	499	0	running	146	$16,075
8	24	30	Michael Waltrip	Bahari Racing	Pontiac	499	0	running	142	$15,375
9	11	21	Morgan Shepherd	Wood Brothers Racing	Ford	498	0	running	138	$14,675
10	5	42	Kyle Petty	SABCO Racing	Pontiac	498	0	running	134	$16,475
11	25	24	Jeff Gordon (R)	Hendrick Motorsports	Chevrolet	498	0	running	130	$13,360
12	22	11	Bill Elliott	Junior Johnson & Associates	Ford	497	0	running	127	$17,075
13	12	25	Ken Schrader	Hendrick Motorsports	Chevrolet	497	0	running	124	$12,125
14	2	7	Geoff Bodine	Geoff Bodine Racing	Ford	497	32	running	126	$17,925
15	23	40	Kenny Wallace (R)	SABCO Racing	Pontiac	496	0	running	118	$9,125
16	21	6	Mark Martin	Roush Racing	Ford	495	0	running	115	$15,275
17	30	4	Jeff Purvis	Morgan–McClure Motorsports	Chevrolet	495	0	running	112	$15,825
18	6	17	Darrell Waltrip	Darrell Waltrip Motorsports	Chevrolet	495	0	running	109	$15,630
19	33	41	Phil Parsons	Larry Hedrick Motorsports	Chevrolet	493	0	running	106	$7,525
20	18	98	Derrike Cope	Cale Yarborough Motorsports	Ford	492	0	running	103	$10,875
21	32	71	Dave Marcis	Marcis Auto Racing	Chevrolet	487	0	running	100	$5,325
22	26	90	Bobby Hillin Jr.	Donlavey Racing	Ford	484	0	running	97	$5,225
23	16	27	Hut Stricklin	Junior Johnson & Associates	Ford	483	0	running	94	$9,775
24	19	15	Lake Speed	Bud Moore Engineering	Ford	478	0	running	91	$12,875
25	10	75	Todd Bodine (R)	Butch Mock Motorsports	Ford	468	0	running	88	$4,775
26	13	1	Rick Mast	Precision Products Racing	Ford	454	0	running	85	$9,425
27	31	16	Wally Dallenbach Jr.	Roush Racing	Ford	447	0	running	82	$9,275
28	34	68	Greg Sacks	TriStar Motorsports	Ford	445	0	engine	79	$4,525
29	7	3	Dale Earnhardt	Richard Childress Racing	Chevrolet	440	0	rear end	76	$10,525
30	3	8	Sterling Marlin	Stavola Brothers Racing	Ford	438	0	running	73	$10,000
31	28	55	Ted Musgrave	RaDiUs Motorsports	Ford	435	0	running	70	$8,925
32	9	22	Bobby Labonte (R)	Bill Davis Racing	Ford	413	0	running	67	$6,400
33	27	33	Harry Gant	Leo Jackson Motorsports	Chevrolet	362	0	transmission	64	$13,375
34	8	44	Jimmy Hensley	Petty Enterprises	Pontiac	292	0	crash	61	$5,875
Official race results

== Standings after the race ==
Drivers' Championship standings

	Pos	Driver	Points
	1	Dale Earnhardt	3,702
	2	Rusty Wallace	3,620 (-82)
1	3	Dale Jarrett	3,428 (-274)
1	4	Mark Martin	3,412 (–290)
	5	Morgan Shepherd	3,287 (–415)
	6	Ken Schrader	3,150 (–552)
	7	Kyle Petty	3,125 (–577)
	8	Bill Elliott	3,041 (–661)
1	9	Ernie Irvan	3,027 (–675)
1	10	Jeff Gordon	2,988 (–714)
Official driver's standings

- Note: Only the first 10 positions are included for the driver standings.

Previous race: 1993 SplitFire Spark Plug 500	NASCAR Winston Cup Series; 1993 season	Next race: 1993 Tyson Holly Farms 400
