= 1993 SplitFire Spark Plug 500 =

24th race of the 1993 NASCAR Winston Cup Series

Race details
- Race 24 of 30 in the 1993 NASCAR Winston Cup Series
- The 1993 SplitFire Spark Plug 500 program cover.
- Date: September 19, 1993
- Official name: 23rd Annual SplitFire Spark Plug 500
- Location: Dover, Delaware, Dover Downs International Speedway
- Course: Permanent racing facility
- Course length: 1 miles (1.6 km)
- Distance: 500 laps, 500 mi (804.672 km)
- Scheduled distance: 500 laps, 500 mi (804.672 km)
- Average speed: 100.334 miles per hour (161.472 km/h)
- Attendance: 86,000

Pole position
Driver	Rusty Wallace	Penske Racing South
- Time: 23.768

Most laps led
Driver	Rusty Wallace	Penske Racing South
- Laps: 215

Winner
No. 2	Rusty Wallace	Penske Racing South

Television in the United States
- Network: TNN
- Announcers: Mike Joy, Buddy Baker, Neil Bonnett

Radio in the United States
- Radio: Motor Racing Network

The 1993 SplitFire Spark Plug 500 was the 24th stock car race of the 1993 NASCAR Winston Cup Series season and the 23rd iteration of the event. The race was held on Sunday, September 19, 1993, before an audience of 86,000 in Dover, Delaware at Dover International Speedway, a 1-mile (1.6 km) permanent oval-shaped racetrack. The race took the scheduled 500 laps to complete. In a controversial victory, Penske Racing South driver Rusty Wallace would manage to comeback from a one-lap deficit partly caused by a wreck Wallace had caused by hitting back of Hut Stricklin's car, causing a five-car pileup, including driver's championship leader Dale Earnhardt on lap 370. As a result, Wallace would get his lap back and manage to climb to the front and take his 28th career NASCAR Winston Cup Series victory and his seventh victory of the season. To fill out the top three, Hendrick Motorsports driver Ken Schrader and owner-driver Darrell Waltrip would finish second and third, respectively.

== Background ==
The layout of Dover Downs International Speedway, the venue where the race was held.

Dover Downs International Speedway is an 1.000 mi (1.609 km) oval track in Dover, Delaware. The venue has hosted major events since its inaugural season in 1969, including NASCAR and IndyCar races. Adjacent to Bally's Dover, which owns the surrounding property, the speedway itself is owned by Speedway Motorsports, LLC (SMI).

The track, nicknamed "The Monster Mile", was built in 1969 by Melvin Joseph of Melvin L. Joseph Construction Company, Inc., with an asphalt surface, but was replaced with concrete in 1995. Six years later in 2001, the track's capacity moved to 135,000 seats, making the track have the largest capacity of sports venue in the mid-Atlantic. In 2002, the name changed to Dover International Speedway from Dover Downs International Speedway after Dover Downs Gaming and Entertainment split, making Dover Motorsports. From 2007 to 2009, the speedway worked on an improvement project called "The Monster Makeover", which expanded facilities at the track and beautified the track. After the 2014 season, the track's capacity was reduced to 95,500 seats.

=== Entry list ===
- (R) denotes rookie driver.

#	Driver	Team	Make
1	Rick Mast	Precision Products Racing	Ford
2	Rusty Wallace	Penske Racing South	Pontiac
02	T. W. Taylor	Taylor Racing	Ford
3	Dale Earnhardt	Richard Childress Racing	Chevrolet
4	Jeff Purvis	Morgan–McClure Motorsports	Chevrolet
5	Ricky Rudd	Hendrick Motorsports	Chevrolet
6	Mark Martin	Roush Racing	Ford
7	Geoff Bodine	Geoff Bodine Racing	Ford
8	Sterling Marlin	Stavola Brothers Racing	Ford
11	Bill Elliott	Junior Johnson & Associates	Ford
12	Jimmy Spencer	Bobby Allison Motorsports	Ford
14	Terry Labonte	Hagan Racing	Chevrolet
15	Lake Speed	Bud Moore Engineering	Ford
16	Wally Dallenbach Jr.	Roush Racing	Ford
17	Darrell Waltrip	Darrell Waltrip Motorsports	Chevrolet
18	Dale Jarrett	Joe Gibbs Racing	Chevrolet
21	Morgan Shepherd	Wood Brothers Racing	Ford
22	Bobby Labonte (R)	Bill Davis Racing	Ford
24	Jeff Gordon (R)	Hendrick Motorsports	Chevrolet
25	Ken Schrader	Hendrick Motorsports	Chevrolet
26	Brett Bodine*	King Racing	Ford
27	Hut Stricklin	Junior Johnson & Associates	Ford
28	Ernie Irvan	Robert Yates Racing	Ford
30	Michael Waltrip	Bahari Racing	Pontiac
32	Jimmy Horton	Active Motorsports	Chevrolet
33	Harry Gant	Leo Jackson Motorsports	Chevrolet
40	Kenny Wallace (R)	SABCO Racing	Pontiac
41	Phil Parsons	Larry Hedrick Motorsports	Chevrolet
42	Kyle Petty	SABCO Racing	Pontiac
44	Rick Wilson	Petty Enterprises	Pontiac
48	Trevor Boys	Hylton Motorsports	Pontiac
52	Jimmy Means	Jimmy Means Racing	Ford
55	Ted Musgrave	RaDiUs Motorsports	Ford
57	Bob Schacht	Bob Schacht Motorsports	Oldsmobile
66	Mike Wallace	Owen Racing	Pontiac
68	Greg Sacks	TriStar Motorsports	Ford
71	Dave Marcis	Marcis Auto Racing	Chevrolet
75	Todd Bodine (R)	Butch Mock Motorsports	Ford
84	Norm Benning	Norm Benning Racing	Oldsmobile
90	Bobby Hillin Jr.	Donlavey Racing	Ford
98	Derrike Cope	Cale Yarborough Motorsports	Ford

*Replaced by Dick Trickle due to an injury sustained in the race's first practice session.

== Qualifying ==
Qualifying was split into two rounds. The first round was held on Friday, September 17, at 3:00 PM EST. Each driver would have one lap to set a time. During the first round, the top 20 drivers in the round would be guaranteed a starting spot in the race. If a driver was not able to guarantee a spot in the first round, they had the option to scrub their time from the first round and try and run a faster lap time in a second round qualifying run, held on Saturday, September 18, at 11:30 AM EST. As with the first round, each driver would have one lap to set a time. For this specific race, positions 21-36 would be decided on time, and depending on who needed it, a select amount of positions were given to cars who had not otherwise qualified but were high enough in owner's points; up to two were given. If needed, a past champion who did not qualify on either time or provisionals could use a champion's provisional, adding one more spot to the field.

Rusty Wallace, driving for Penske Racing South, would win the pole, setting a time of 23.768 and an average speed of 151.464 miles per hour (243.758 km/h) in the first round.

Four drivers would fail to qualify.

=== Full qualifying results ===
Pos.	#	Driver	Team	Make	Time	Speed
1	2	Rusty Wallace	Penske Racing South	Pontiac	23.768	151.464
2	28	Ernie Irvan	Robert Yates Racing	Ford	23.812	151.184
3	24	Jeff Gordon (R)	Hendrick Motorsports	Chevrolet	23.889	150.697
4	7	Geoff Bodine	Geoff Bodine Racing	Ford	23.931	150.432
5	6	Mark Martin	Roush Racing	Ford	23.940	150.376
6	44	Rick Wilson	Petty Enterprises	Pontiac	23.968	150.200
7	21	Morgan Shepherd	Wood Brothers Racing	Ford	23.991	150.056
8	33	Harry Gant	Leo Jackson Motorsports	Chevrolet	24.062	149.613
9	3	Dale Earnhardt	Richard Childress Racing	Chevrolet	24.080	149.502
10	25	Ken Schrader	Hendrick Motorsports	Chevrolet	24.083	149.483
11	22	Bobby Labonte (R)	Bill Davis Racing	Ford	24.119	149.260
12	1	Rick Mast	Precision Products Racing	Ford	24.119	149.260
13	11	Bill Elliott	Junior Johnson & Associates	Ford	24.144	149.105
14	98	Derrike Cope	Cale Yarborough Motorsports	Ford	24.187	148.840
15	42	Kyle Petty	SABCO Racing	Pontiac	24.224	148.613
16	27	Hut Stricklin	Junior Johnson & Associates	Ford	24.233	148.558
17	17	Darrell Waltrip	Darrell Waltrip Motorsports	Chevrolet	24.244	148.490
18	8	Sterling Marlin	Stavola Brothers Racing	Ford	24.245	148.484
19	12	Jimmy Spencer	Bobby Allison Motorsports	Ford	24.249	148.460
20	41	Phil Parsons	Larry Hedrick Motorsports	Chevrolet	24.267	148.350
Failed to lock in Round 1
21	55	Ted Musgrave	RaDiUs Motorsports	Ford	23.892	150.678
22	5	Ricky Rudd	Hendrick Motorsports	Chevrolet	23.931	150.432
23	26	Dick Trickle	King Racing	Ford	24.062	149.613
24	30	Michael Waltrip	Bahari Racing	Pontiac	24.163	148.988
25	15	Lake Speed	Bud Moore Engineering	Ford	24.267	148.350
26	18	Dale Jarrett	Joe Gibbs Racing	Chevrolet	24.281	148.264
27	14	Terry Labonte	Hagan Racing	Chevrolet	24.327	147.984
28	75	Todd Bodine (R)	Butch Mock Motorsports	Ford	24.360	147.783
29	68	Greg Sacks	TriStar Motorsports	Ford	24.380	147.662
30	32	Jimmy Horton	Active Motorsports	Chevrolet	24.384	147.638
31	71	Dave Marcis	Marcis Auto Racing	Chevrolet	24.411	147.474
32	90	Bobby Hillin Jr.	Donlavey Racing	Ford	24.487	147.017
33	16	Wally Dallenbach Jr.	Roush Racing	Ford	24.635	146.134
34	57	Bob Schacht	Bob Schacht Motorsports	Oldsmobile	24.762	145.384
35	4	Jeff Purvis	Morgan–McClure Motorsports	Chevrolet	24.826	145.009
36	40	Kenny Wallace (R)	SABCO Racing	Pontiac	24.856	144.834
Provisional
37	52	Jimmy Means	Jimmy Means Racing	Ford	25.319	142.186
Failed to qualify
38	48	Trevor Boys	Hylton Motorsports	Pontiac	-*	-*
39	84	Norm Benning	Norm Benning Racing	Oldsmobile	-*	-*
40	66	Mike Wallace	Owen Racing	Pontiac	-	-
41	02	T. W. Taylor	Taylor Racing	Ford	-	-
Official first round qualifying results
Official starting lineup

== Race results ==
Fin	St	#	Driver	Team	Make	Laps	Led	Status	Pts	Winnings
1	1	2	Rusty Wallace	Penske Racing South	Pontiac	500	215	running	185	$77,645
2	10	25	Ken Schrader	Hendrick Motorsports	Chevrolet	500	127	running	175	$53,115
3	17	17	Darrell Waltrip	Darrell Waltrip Motorsports	Chevrolet	500	55	running	170	$38,410
4	26	18	Dale Jarrett	Joe Gibbs Racing	Chevrolet	500	2	running	165	$31,035
5	8	33	Harry Gant	Leo Jackson Motorsports	Chevrolet	500	0	running	155	$27,830
6	19	12	Jimmy Spencer	Bobby Allison Motorsports	Ford	500	0	running	150	$21,580
7	11	22	Bobby Labonte (R)	Bill Davis Racing	Ford	500	0	running	146	$16,680
8	27	14	Terry Labonte	Hagan Racing	Chevrolet	500	1	running	147	$17,980
9	7	21	Morgan Shepherd	Wood Brothers Racing	Ford	499	0	running	138	$17,230
10	13	11	Bill Elliott	Junior Johnson & Associates	Ford	498	0	running	134	$23,430
11	18	8	Sterling Marlin	Stavola Brothers Racing	Ford	498	0	running	130	$15,980
12	32	90	Bobby Hillin Jr.	Donlavey Racing	Ford	498	0	running	127	$9,680
13	35	4	Jeff Purvis	Morgan–McClure Motorsports	Chevrolet	497	2	running	129	$18,980
14	15	42	Kyle Petty	SABCO Racing	Pontiac	495	0	running	121	$17,080
15	33	16	Wally Dallenbach Jr.	Roush Racing	Ford	492	0	running	118	$14,580
16	36	40	Kenny Wallace (R)	SABCO Racing	Pontiac	489	0	running	115	$11,630
17	37	52	Jimmy Means	Jimmy Means Racing	Ford	489	0	running	112	$8,530
18	12	1	Rick Mast	Precision Products Racing	Ford	477	0	running	109	$13,615
19	31	71	Dave Marcis	Marcis Auto Racing	Chevrolet	470	0	running	106	$8,305
20	29	68	Greg Sacks	TriStar Motorsports	Ford	462	0	running	103	$8,805
21	22	5	Ricky Rudd	Hendrick Motorsports	Chevrolet	456	0	handling	100	$13,205
22	30	32	Jimmy Horton	Active Motorsports	Chevrolet	440	0	crash	97	$8,155
23	24	30	Michael Waltrip	Bahari Racing	Pontiac	421	0	handling	94	$13,005
24	3	24	Jeff Gordon (R)	Hendrick Motorsports	Chevrolet	412	80	handling	96	$11,255
25	23	26	Dick Trickle	King Racing	Ford	407	0	running	88	$12,755
26	2	28	Ernie Irvan	Robert Yates Racing	Ford	405	18	running	90	$19,105
27	9	3	Dale Earnhardt	Richard Childress Racing	Chevrolet	404	0	running	82	$14,555
28	21	55	Ted Musgrave	RaDiUs Motorsports	Ford	402	0	engine	79	$12,955
29	16	27	Hut Stricklin	Junior Johnson & Associates	Ford	368	0	crash	76	$12,380
30	4	7	Geoff Bodine	Geoff Bodine Racing	Ford	358	0	crash	73	$17,155
31	5	6	Mark Martin	Roush Racing	Ford	237	0	crash	70	$16,705
32	14	98	Derrike Cope	Cale Yarborough Motorsports	Ford	232	0	crash	67	$12,205
33	25	15	Lake Speed	Bud Moore Engineering	Ford	232	0	engine	64	$15,605
34	6	44	Rick Wilson	Petty Enterprises	Pontiac	117	0	crash	61	$9,080
35	28	75	Todd Bodine (R)	Butch Mock Motorsports	Ford	60	0	crash	58	$7,505
36	34	57	Bob Schacht	Bob Schacht Motorsports	Oldsmobile	20	0	rotor	55	$7,480
37	20	41	Phil Parsons	Larry Hedrick Motorsports	Chevrolet	10	0	crash	52	$8,980
Official race results

== Standings after the race ==
Drivers' Championship standings

	Pos	Driver	Points
	1	Dale Earnhardt	3,626
	2	Rusty Wallace	3,445 (-181)
	3	Mark Martin	3,297 (-329)
	4	Dale Jarrett	3,273 (–353)
	5	Morgan Shepherd	3,149 (–477)
1	6	Ken Schrader	3,026 (–600)
1	7	Kyle Petty	2,991 (–635)
	8	Bill Elliott	2,914 (–712)
	9	Jeff Gordon	2,858 (–768)
	10	Ernie Irvan	2,842 (–784)
Official driver's standings

- Note: Only the first 10 positions are included for the driver standings.

Previous race: 1993 Miller Genuine Draft 400 (Richmond)	NASCAR Winston Cup Series; 1993 season	Next race: 1993 Goody's 500
