= 1991 DieHard 500 =

17th race of the 1991 NASCAR Winston Cup Series

Race details
- Race 17 of 29 in the 1991 NASCAR Winston Cup Series
- The 1991 DieHard 500 program cover, featuring Richard Petty.
- Date: July 28, 1991
- Official name: 23rd Annual DieHard 500
- Location: Lincoln, Alabama, Talladega Superspeedway
- Course: Permanent racing facility
- Course length: 2.66 miles (4.28 km)
- Distance: 188 laps, 500.08 mi (804.8 km)
- Scheduled distance: 188 laps, 500.08 mi (804.8 km)
- Average speed: 147.383 miles per hour (237.190 km/h)
- Attendance: 95,000

Pole position
Driver	Sterling Marlin	Junior Johnson & Associates
- Time: 49.853

Most laps led
Driver	Dale Earnhardt	Richard Childress Racing
- Laps: 101

Winner
No. 3	Dale Earnhardt	Richard Childress Racing

Television in the United States
- Network: CBS
- Announcers: Ken Squier, Ned Jarrett

Radio in the United States
- Radio: Motor Racing Network

The 1991 DieHard 500 was the 17th stock car race of the 1991 NASCAR Winston Cup Series and the 23rd iteration of the event. The race was held on Sunday, July 28, 1991, before an audience of 95,000 in Lincoln, Alabama at Talladega Superspeedway, a 2.66 miles (4.28 km) permanent triangle-shaped superspeedway. The race took the scheduled 188 laps to complete. In the final laps of the race, Richard Childress Racing driver Dale Earnhardt would manage to fend off the field, leading the final 28 laps of the race to take his 51st career NASCAR Winston Cup Series victory and his third victory of the season. To fill out the top three, Melling Racing driver Bill Elliott and Roush Racing driver Mark Martin would finish second and third, respectively.

== Background ==
The layout of Talladega Superspeedway, the venue where the race was held.

Talladega Superspeedway, originally known as Alabama International Motor Superspeedway (AIMS), is a motorsports complex located north of Talladega, Alabama. It is located on the former Anniston Air Force Base in the small city of Lincoln. The track is a tri-oval and was constructed in the 1960s by the International Speedway Corporation, a business controlled by the France family. Talladega is most known for its steep banking and the unique location of the start/finish line that's located just past the exit to pit road. The track currently hosts the NASCAR series such as the NASCAR Cup Series, Xfinity Series and the Camping World Truck Series. Talladega is the longest NASCAR oval, a 2.66-mile-long (4.28 km) tri-oval like the Daytona International Speedway, which also is a 2.5-mile-long (4.0 km) tri-oval.

=== Entry list ===
- (R) denotes rookie driver.

#	Driver	Team	Make
1	Rick Mast	Precision Products Racing	Oldsmobile
2	Rusty Wallace	Penske Racing South	Pontiac
3	Dale Earnhardt	Richard Childress Racing	Chevrolet
4	Ernie Irvan	Morgan–McClure Motorsports	Chevrolet
5	Ricky Rudd	Hendrick Motorsports	Chevrolet
6	Mark Martin	Roush Racing	Ford
7	Alan Kulwicki	AK Racing	Ford
8	Rick Wilson	Stavola Brothers Racing	Buick
9	Bill Elliott	Melling Racing	Ford
10	Derrike Cope	Whitcomb Racing	Chevrolet
11	Geoff Bodine	Junior Johnson & Associates	Ford
12	Hut Stricklin	Bobby Allison Motorsports	Buick
14	Mike Chase	A. J. Foyt Racing	Oldsmobile
15	Morgan Shepherd	Bud Moore Engineering	Ford
17	Darrell Waltrip	Darrell Waltrip Motorsports	Chevrolet
19	Chad Little	Little Racing	Ford
20	Buddy Baker	Moroso Racing	Oldsmobile
21	Dale Jarrett	Wood Brothers Racing	Ford
22	Sterling Marlin	Junior Johnson & Associates	Ford
24	Dick Trickle	Team III Racing	Pontiac
25	Ken Schrader	Hendrick Motorsports	Chevrolet
26	Brett Bodine	King Racing	Buick
28	Davey Allison	Robert Yates Racing	Ford
30	Michael Waltrip	Bahari Racing	Pontiac
33	Harry Gant	Leo Jackson Motorsports	Oldsmobile
41	Larry Pearson	Larry Hedrick Motorsports	Chevrolet
42	Bobby Hillin Jr.	SABCO Racing	Pontiac
43	Richard Petty	Petty Enterprises	Pontiac
47	Greg Sacks	Close Racing	Oldsmobile
49	Stanley Smith (R)	BS&S Motorsports	Buick
51	Jeff Purvis (R)	Phoenix Racing	Oldsmobile
52	Jimmy Means	Jimmy Means Racing	Pontiac
55	Ted Musgrave (R)	U.S. Racing	Pontiac
59	Mark Gibson	Gibson Racing	Pontiac
66	Lake Speed	Cale Yarborough Motorsports	Pontiac
68	Bobby Hamilton (R)	TriStar Motorsports	Oldsmobile
71	Dave Marcis	Marcis Auto Racing	Chevrolet
73	Phil Barkdoll	Barkdoll Racing	Oldsmobile
75	Joe Ruttman	RahMoc Enterprises	Oldsmobile
90	Wally Dallenbach Jr. (R)	Donlavey Racing	Ford
94	Terry Labonte	Hagan Racing	Oldsmobile
95	Eddie Bierschwale	Sadler Brothers Racing	Chevrolet
98	Jimmy Spencer	Travis Carter Enterprises	Chevrolet

== Qualifying ==
Qualifying was split into two rounds. The first round was held on Thursday, July 24, at 4:30 PM EST. Each driver would have one lap to set a time. During the first round, the top 15 drivers in the round would be guaranteed a starting spot in the race. If a driver was not able to guarantee a spot in the first round, they had the option to scrub their time from the first round and try and run a faster lap time in a second round qualifying run, held on Friday, July 25, at 4:30 PM EST. As with the first round, each driver would have one lap to set a time. For this specific race, positions 16-40 would be decided on time, and depending on who needed it, a select amount of positions were given to cars who had not otherwise qualified but were high enough in owner's points; up to two provisionals were given. If needed, a past champion who did not qualify on either time or provisionals could use a champion's provisional, adding one more spot to the field.

Sterling Marlin, driving for Junior Johnson & Associates, won the pole, setting a time of 49.853 and an average speed of 192.085 mph (309.131 km/h) in the first round.

Two drivers would fail to qualify.

=== Full qualifying results ===
Pos.	#	Driver	Team	Make	Time	Speed
1	22	Sterling Marlin	Junior Johnson & Associates	Ford	49.853	192.085
2	6	Mark Martin	Roush Racing	Ford	49.896	191.919
3	4	Ernie Irvan	Morgan–McClure Motorsports	Chevrolet	49.964	191.658
4	3	Dale Earnhardt	Richard Childress Racing	Chevrolet	50.138	190.993
5	9	Bill Elliott	Melling Racing	Ford	50.140	190.985
6	19	Chad Little	Little Racing	Ford	50.188	190.803
7	28	Davey Allison	Robert Yates Racing	Ford	50.208	190.727
8	2	Rusty Wallace	Penske Racing South	Pontiac	50.333	190.253
9	33	Harry Gant	Leo Jackson Motorsports	Oldsmobile	50.353	190.177
10	7	Alan Kulwicki	AK Racing	Ford	50.374	190.098
11	11	Geoff Bodine	Junior Johnson & Associates	Ford	50.501	189.620
12	66	Lake Speed	Cale Yarborough Motorsports	Pontiac	50.541	189.470
13	30	Michael Waltrip	Bahari Racing	Pontiac	50.604	189.234
14	17	Darrell Waltrip	Darrell Waltrip Motorsports	Chevrolet	50.647	189.073
15	12	Hut Stricklin	Bobby Allison Motorsports	Buick	50.822	188.422
16	68	Bobby Hamilton (R)	TriStar Motorsports	Oldsmobile	50.878	188.215
17	1	Rick Mast	Precision Products Racing	Oldsmobile	50.885	188.189
18	5	Ricky Rudd	Hendrick Motorsports	Chevrolet	50.919	188.063
19	75	Joe Ruttman	RahMoc Enterprises	Oldsmobile	50.948	187.956
20	43	Richard Petty	Petty Enterprises	Pontiac	51.012	187.721
Failed to lock in Round 1
21	42	Bobby Hillin Jr.	SABCO Racing	Pontiac	50.821	188.426
22	15	Morgan Shepherd	Bud Moore Engineering	Ford	51.082	187.463
23	49	Stanley Smith (R)	BS&S Motorsports	Buick	51.184	187.090
24	24	Dick Trickle	Team III Racing	Pontiac	51.201	187.028
25	25	Ken Schrader	Hendrick Motorsports	Chevrolet	51.243	186.874
26	90	Wally Dallenbach Jr. (R)	Donlavey Racing	Ford	51.299	186.670
27	55	Ted Musgrave (R)	U.S. Racing	Pontiac	51.328	186.565
28	41	Larry Pearson	Larry Hedrick Motorsports	Chevrolet	51.346	186.499
29	26	Brett Bodine	King Racing	Buick	51.396	186.318
30	8	Rick Wilson	Stavola Brothers Racing	Buick	51.434	186.180
31	14	Mike Chase	A. J. Foyt Racing	Oldsmobile	51.464	186.072
32	73	Phil Barkdoll	Barkdoll Racing	Oldsmobile	51.478	186.021
33	47	Greg Sacks	Close Racing	Oldsmobile	51.543	185.787
34	20	Buddy Baker	Moroso Racing	Oldsmobile	51.583	185.643
35	94	Terry Labonte	Hagan Racing	Oldsmobile	51.629	185.477
36	52	Jimmy Means	Jimmy Means Racing	Pontiac	51.700	185.222
37	10	Derrike Cope	Whitcomb Racing	Chevrolet	51.706	185.201
38	98	Jimmy Spencer	Travis Carter Enterprises	Chevrolet	51.769	184.976
39	95	Eddie Bierschwale	Sadler Brothers Racing	Chevrolet	51.795	184.883
40	21	Dale Jarrett	Wood Brothers Racing	Ford	51.799	184.868
Provisional
41	71	Dave Marcis	Marcis Auto Racing	Chevrolet	53.358	179.467
Failed to qualify
42	51	Jeff Purvis (R)	Phoenix Racing	Oldsmobile	-*	-*
43	59	Mark Gibson	Gibson Racing	Pontiac	-*	-*
Official first round qualifying results
Official starting lineup

== Race results ==
Fin	St	#	Driver	Team	Make	Laps	Led	Status	Pts	Winnings
1	4	3	Dale Earnhardt	Richard Childress Racing	Chevrolet	188	101	running	185	$88,670
2	5	9	Bill Elliott	Melling Racing	Ford	188	1	running	175	$51,185
3	2	6	Mark Martin	Roush Racing	Ford	188	3	running	170	$46,390
4	18	5	Ricky Rudd	Hendrick Motorsports	Chevrolet	188	2	running	165	$29,400
5	1	22	Sterling Marlin	Junior Johnson & Associates	Ford	188	33	running	160	$27,075
6	8	2	Rusty Wallace	Penske Racing South	Pontiac	188	1	running	155	$16,250
7	13	30	Michael Waltrip	Bahari Racing	Pontiac	188	4	running	151	$16,050
8	40	21	Dale Jarrett	Wood Brothers Racing	Ford	188	8	running	147	$14,400
9	7	28	Davey Allison	Robert Yates Racing	Ford	188	12	running	143	$19,120
10	19	75	Joe Ruttman	RahMoc Enterprises	Oldsmobile	188	0	running	134	$15,800
11	21	42	Bobby Hillin Jr.	SABCO Racing	Pontiac	188	0	running	130	$16,330
12	6	19	Chad Little	Little Racing	Ford	188	7	running	132	$8,250
13	34	20	Buddy Baker	Moroso Racing	Oldsmobile	188	0	running	124	$9,930
14	22	15	Morgan Shepherd	Bud Moore Engineering	Ford	188	0	running	121	$14,860
15	14	17	Darrell Waltrip	Darrell Waltrip Motorsports	Chevrolet	188	1	running	123	$10,135
16	10	7	Alan Kulwicki	AK Racing	Ford	187	0	running	115	$14,550
17	28	41	Larry Pearson	Larry Hedrick Motorsports	Chevrolet	187	0	running	112	$7,385
18	20	43	Richard Petty	Petty Enterprises	Pontiac	187	0	running	109	$10,880
19	33	47	Greg Sacks	Close Racing	Oldsmobile	186	0	running	106	$7,100
20	24	24	Dick Trickle	Team III Racing	Pontiac	186	0	running	103	$9,160
21	41	71	Dave Marcis	Marcis Auto Racing	Chevrolet	186	0	running	100	$9,980
22	32	73	Phil Barkdoll	Barkdoll Racing	Oldsmobile	185	0	running	97	$6,625
23	36	52	Jimmy Means	Jimmy Means Racing	Pontiac	185	0	running	94	$6,370
24	35	94	Terry Labonte	Hagan Racing	Oldsmobile	184	0	running	91	$9,215
25	31	14	Mike Chase	A. J. Foyt Racing	Oldsmobile	184	0	running	88	$6,110
26	27	55	Ted Musgrave (R)	U.S. Racing	Pontiac	182	0	running	85	$7,635
27	39	95	Eddie Bierschwale	Sadler Brothers Racing	Chevrolet	181	0	running	82	$5,865
28	17	1	Rick Mast	Precision Products Racing	Oldsmobile	166	10	crash	84	$8,645
29	15	12	Hut Stricklin	Bobby Allison Motorsports	Buick	150	5	crash	81	$8,475
30	11	11	Geoff Bodine	Junior Johnson & Associates	Ford	150	0	crash	73	$14,455
31	23	49	Stanley Smith (R)	BS&S Motorsports	Buick	147	0	oil pressure	70	$5,985
32	29	26	Brett Bodine	King Racing	Buick	146	0	oil pressure	67	$8,215
33	3	4	Ernie Irvan	Morgan–McClure Motorsports	Chevrolet	146	0	crash	64	$13,645
34	16	68	Bobby Hamilton (R)	TriStar Motorsports	Oldsmobile	130	0	running	61	$5,400
35	37	10	Derrike Cope	Whitcomb Racing	Chevrolet	117	0	oil pan	58	$13,755
36	12	66	Lake Speed	Cale Yarborough Motorsports	Pontiac	109	0	axle	55	$7,995
37	38	98	Jimmy Spencer	Travis Carter Enterprises	Chevrolet	102	0	engine	52	$7,945
38	30	8	Rick Wilson	Stavola Brothers Racing	Buick	102	0	crash	49	$7,895
39	9	33	Harry Gant	Leo Jackson Motorsports	Oldsmobile	90	0	crash	46	$7,815
40	25	25	Ken Schrader	Hendrick Motorsports	Chevrolet	77	0	valve	43	$7,150
41	26	90	Wally Dallenbach Jr. (R)	Donlavey Racing	Ford	2	0	crash	40	$5,150
Official race results

== Standings after the race ==
Drivers' Championship standings

	Pos	Driver	Points
	1	Dale Earnhardt	2,635
	2	Ricky Rudd	2,475 (-160)
1	3	Davey Allison	2,393 (-242)
1	4	Ernie Irvan	2,359 (–276)
1	5	Mark Martin	2,330 (–305)
1	6	Ken Schrader	2,279 (–356)
	7	Darrell Waltrip	2,259 (–376)
1	8	Sterling Marlin	2,156 (–479)
1	9	Harry Gant	2,131 (–504)
	10	Rusty Wallace	2,126 (–509)
Official driver's standings

- Note: Only the first 10 positions are included for the driver standings.

Previous race: 1991 Miller Genuine Draft 500	NASCAR Winston Cup Series; 1991 season	Next race: 1991 Budweiser at The Glen
