= 1993 Mountain Dew Southern 500 =

22nd race of the 1993 NASCAR Winston Cup Series

Race details
- Race 22 of 30 in the 1993 NASCAR Winston Cup Series
- The 1993 Southern 500 program cover, featuring Dale Jarrett, Dale Earnhardt, and Ernie Irvan.
- Date: September 5, 1993
- Official name: 44th Annual Mountain Dew Southern 500
- Location: Darlington Raceway, Darlington, South Carolina
- Course: Permanent racing facility
- Course length: 1.366 miles (2.198 km)
- Distance: 351 laps, 479.466 mi (771.626 km)
- Scheduled distance: 367 laps, 501.322 mi (806.800 km)
- Average speed: 137.932 miles per hour (221.980 km/h)

Pole position
Driver	Ken Schrader	Hendrick Motorsports
- Time: 30.495

Most laps led
Driver	Mark Martin	Roush Racing
- Laps: 178

Winner
No. 6	Mark Martin	Roush Racing

Television in the United States
- Network: ESPN
- Announcers: Bob Jenkins, Ned Jarrett, Benny Parsons

Radio in the United States
- Radio: Motor Racing Network

The 1993 Mountain Dew Southern 500 was the 22nd stock car race of the 1993 NASCAR Winston Cup Series season and the 44th iteration of the event. The race was held on Sunday, September 5, 1993, in Darlington, South Carolina, at Darlington Raceway, a 1.366-mile (2.198-kilometre) permanent egg-shaped oval racetrack. The race was shortened from its scheduled 367 laps to 351 laps due to rain delays, which caused the race to be cut short due to darkness. When the final ten-lap warning was given out, Roush Racing driver Mark Martin would manage to pull away from the field to take his 11th career NASCAR Winston Cup Series victory, his fourth victory of the season, and his fourth consecutive victory. To fill out the top three, King Racing driver Brett Bodine and Penske Racing South driver Rusty Wallace would finish second and third, respectively.

== Background ==
The layout of Darlington Raceway, the venue where the race was held.

Darlington Raceway is a race track built for NASCAR racing located near Darlington, South Carolina. It is nicknamed "The Lady in Black" and "The Track Too Tough to Tame" by many NASCAR fans and drivers and advertised as "A NASCAR Tradition." It is of a unique, somewhat egg-shaped design, an oval with the ends of very different configurations, a condition which supposedly arose from the proximity of one end of the track to a minnow pond the owner refused to relocate. This situation makes it very challenging for the crews to set up their cars' handling in a way that is effective at both ends.

=== Entry list ===
- (R) denotes rookie driver.

#	Driver	Team	Make
1	Rick Mast	Precision Products Racing	Ford
2	Rusty Wallace	Penske Racing South	Pontiac
3	Dale Earnhardt	Richard Childress Racing	Chevrolet
4	Jeff Purvis	Morgan–McClure Motorsports	Chevrolet
5	Ricky Rudd	Hendrick Motorsports	Chevrolet
6	Mark Martin	Roush Racing	Ford
7	Jimmy Hensley	AK Racing	Ford
8	Sterling Marlin	Stavola Brothers Racing	Ford
11	Bill Elliott	Junior Johnson & Associates	Ford
12	Jimmy Spencer	Bobby Allison Motorsports	Ford
14	Terry Labonte	Hagan Racing	Chevrolet
15	Geoff Bodine	Bud Moore Engineering	Ford
16	Wally Dallenbach Jr.	Roush Racing	Ford
17	Darrell Waltrip	Darrell Waltrip Motorsports	Chevrolet
18	Dale Jarrett	Joe Gibbs Racing	Chevrolet
20	Bobby Hamilton	Moroso Racing	Ford
21	Morgan Shepherd	Wood Brothers Racing	Ford
22	Bobby Labonte (R)	Bill Davis Racing	Ford
24	Jeff Gordon (R)	Hendrick Motorsports	Chevrolet
25	Ken Schrader	Hendrick Motorsports	Chevrolet
26	Brett Bodine	King Racing	Ford
27	Hut Stricklin	Junior Johnson & Associates	Ford
28	Ernie Irvan	Robert Yates Racing	Ford
29	Jeff McClure	McClure Racing	Chevrolet
30	Michael Waltrip	Bahari Racing	Pontiac
33	Harry Gant	Leo Jackson Motorsports	Chevrolet
36	H. B. Bailey	Bailey Racing	Pontiac
40	Kenny Wallace (R)	SABCO Racing	Pontiac
41	Phil Parsons	Larry Hedrick Motorsports	Chevrolet
42	Kyle Petty	SABCO Racing	Pontiac
44	Rick Wilson	Petty Enterprises	Pontiac
48	Trevor Boys	Hylton Motorsports	Pontiac
52	Mike Skinner	Jimmy Means Racing	Ford
53	Jimmy Means	Jimmy Means Racing	Ford
55	Ted Musgrave	RaDiUs Motorsports	Ford
56	Jerry Hill	Hill Motorsports	Chevrolet
68	Greg Sacks	TriStar Motorsports	Ford
71	Dave Marcis	Marcis Auto Racing	Chevrolet
75	Todd Bodine (R)	Butch Mock Motorsports	Ford
85	Bob Schacht	Mansion Motorsports	Ford
90	Bobby Hillin Jr.	Donlavey Racing	Ford
98	Derrike Cope	Cale Yarborough Motorsports	Ford
99	Brad Teague	Ball Motorsports	Chevrolet

== Qualifying ==
Qualifying was split into two rounds. The first round was held on Friday, September 3, at 3:00 PM EDT. Each driver would have one lap to set a time. During the first round, the top 20 drivers in the round would be guaranteed a starting spot in the race. If a driver was not able to guarantee a spot in the first round, they had the option to scrub their time from the first round and try and run a faster lap time in a second round qualifying run, held on Saturday, September 4 at 11:30 AM EDT. As with the first round, each driver would have one lap to set a time. For this specific race, positions 21-40 would be decided on time, and depending on who needed it, a select amount of positions were given to cars who had not otherwise qualified but were high enough in owner's points; up to two provisionals were given. If needed, a past champion who did not qualify on either time or provisionals could use a champion's provisional, adding one more spot to the field.

Ken Schrader, driving for Hendrick Motorsports, would win the pole, setting a time of 30.495 and an average speed of 161.259 miles per hour (259.521 km/h) in the first round.

Three drivers would fail to qualify.

=== Full qualifying results ===
Pos.	#	Driver	Team	Make	Time	Speed
1	25	Ken Schrader	Hendrick Motorsports	Chevrolet	30.495	161.259
2	33	Harry Gant	Leo Jackson Motorsports	Chevrolet	30.545	160.995
3	22	Bobby Labonte (R)	Bill Davis Racing	Ford	30.677	160.303
4	6	Mark Martin	Roush Racing	Ford	30.679	160.292
5	98	Derrike Cope	Cale Yarborough Motorsports	Ford	30.750	159.922
6	3	Dale Earnhardt	Richard Childress Racing	Chevrolet	30.752	159.912
7	11	Bill Elliott	Junior Johnson & Associates	Ford	30.783	159.751
8	1	Rick Mast	Precision Products Racing	Ford	30.869	159.305
9	8	Sterling Marlin	Stavola Brothers Racing	Ford	30.927	159.007
10	28	Ernie Irvan	Robert Yates Racing	Ford	30.929	158.996
11	2	Rusty Wallace	Penske Racing South	Pontiac	30.941	158.935
12	26	Brett Bodine	King Racing	Ford	30.960	158.837
13	68	Greg Sacks	TriStar Motorsports	Ford	31.015	158.556
14	12	Jimmy Spencer	Bobby Allison Motorsports	Ford	31.080	158.224
15	24	Jeff Gordon (R)	Hendrick Motorsports	Chevrolet	31.102	158.112
16	5	Ricky Rudd	Hendrick Motorsports	Chevrolet	31.104	158.102
17	75	Todd Bodine (R)	Butch Mock Motorsports	Ford	31.109	158.076
18	55	Ted Musgrave	RaDiUs Motorsports	Ford	31.146	157.889
19	90	Bobby Hillin Jr.	Donlavey Racing	Ford	31.149	157.873
20	14	Terry Labonte	Hagan Racing	Chevrolet	31.150	157.868
Failed to lock in Round 1
21	21	Morgan Shepherd	Wood Brothers Racing	Ford	31.179	157.722
22	4	Jeff Purvis	Morgan–McClure Motorsports	Chevrolet	31.194	157.646
23	27	Hut Stricklin	Junior Johnson & Associates	Ford	31.194	157.646
24	17	Darrell Waltrip	Darrell Waltrip Motorsports	Chevrolet	31.210	157.565
25	30	Michael Waltrip	Bahari Racing	Pontiac	31.226	157.484
26	7	Jimmy Hensley	AK Racing	Ford	31.235	157.439
27	18	Dale Jarrett	Joe Gibbs Racing	Chevrolet	31.261	157.308
28	42	Kyle Petty	SABCO Racing	Pontiac	31.280	157.212
29	15	Geoff Bodine	Bud Moore Engineering	Ford	31.283	157.197
30	16	Wally Dallenbach Jr.	Roush Racing	Ford	31.292	157.152
31	40	Kenny Wallace (R)	SABCO Racing	Pontiac	31.442	156.402
32	20	Bobby Hamilton	Moroso Racing	Ford	31.461	156.308
33	71	Dave Marcis	Marcis Auto Racing	Chevrolet	31.528	155.976
34	41	Phil Parsons	Larry Hedrick Motorsports	Chevrolet	31.539	155.921
35	44	Rick Wilson	Petty Enterprises	Pontiac	31.607	155.586
36	52	Mike Skinner	Jimmy Means Racing	Ford	31.653	155.360
37	85	Bob Schacht	Mansion Motorsports	Ford	31.662	155.316
38	99	Brad Teague	Ball Motorsports	Chevrolet	31.758	154.846
39	53	Jimmy Means	Jimmy Means Racing	Ford	32.220	152.626
40	36	H. B. Bailey	Bailey Racing	Pontiac	32.635	150.685
Failed to qualify
41	29	Jeff McClure	McClure Racing	Chevrolet	32.637	150.671
42	48	Trevor Boys	Hylton Motorsports	Pontiac	-*	-*
43	56	Jerry Hill	Hill Motorsports	Chevrolet	-*	-*
Official first round qualifying results
Official starting lineup

== Race results ==
Fin	St	#	Driver	Team	Make	Laps	Led	Status	Pts	Winnings
1	4	6	Mark Martin	Roush Racing	Ford	351	178	running	185	$67,765
2	12	26	Brett Bodine	King Racing	Ford	351	4	running	175	$40,690
3	11	2	Rusty Wallace	Penske Racing South	Pontiac	351	3	running	170	$27,495
4	6	3	Dale Earnhardt	Richard Childress Racing	Chevrolet	351	101	running	165	$31,090
5	10	28	Ernie Irvan	Robert Yates Racing	Ford	350	46	running	160	$28,395
6	16	5	Ricky Rudd	Hendrick Motorsports	Chevrolet	350	0	running	150	$16,940
7	2	33	Harry Gant	Leo Jackson Motorsports	Chevrolet	350	2	running	151	$19,945
8	21	21	Morgan Shepherd	Wood Brothers Racing	Ford	349	0	running	142	$16,025
9	1	25	Ken Schrader	Hendrick Motorsports	Chevrolet	349	12	running	143	$19,195
10	31	40	Kenny Wallace (R)	SABCO Racing	Pontiac	348	0	running	134	$14,255
11	30	16	Wally Dallenbach Jr.	Roush Racing	Ford	348	0	running	130	$14,405
12	27	18	Dale Jarrett	Joe Gibbs Racing	Chevrolet	348	0	running	127	$16,510
13	25	30	Michael Waltrip	Bahari Racing	Pontiac	348	0	running	124	$13,820
14	3	22	Bobby Labonte (R)	Bill Davis Racing	Ford	347	0	running	121	$12,130
15	14	12	Jimmy Spencer	Bobby Allison Motorsports	Ford	347	0	running	118	$13,390
16	28	42	Kyle Petty	SABCO Racing	Pontiac	347	0	running	115	$15,770
17	5	98	Derrike Cope	Cale Yarborough Motorsports	Ford	347	0	running	112	$12,500
18	7	11	Bill Elliott	Junior Johnson & Associates	Ford	347	0	running	109	$17,625
19	32	20	Bobby Hamilton	Moroso Racing	Ford	347	0	running	106	$7,245
20	29	15	Geoff Bodine	Bud Moore Engineering	Ford	346	0	running	103	$15,625
21	34	41	Phil Parsons	Larry Hedrick Motorsports	Chevrolet	346	0	running	100	$9,090
22	15	24	Jeff Gordon (R)	Hendrick Motorsports	Chevrolet	346	3	running	102	$8,870
23	26	7	Jimmy Hensley	AK Racing	Ford	345	1	running	99	$15,900
24	19	90	Bobby Hillin Jr.	Donlavey Racing	Ford	345	0	running	91	$6,325
25	13	68	Greg Sacks	TriStar Motorsports	Ford	344	0	running	88	$6,215
26	22	4	Jeff Purvis	Morgan–McClure Motorsports	Chevrolet	343	1	running	90	$15,655
27	17	75	Todd Bodine (R)	Butch Mock Motorsports	Ford	341	0	running	82	$5,945
28	24	17	Darrell Waltrip	Darrell Waltrip Motorsports	Chevrolet	339	0	running	79	$15,635
29	33	71	Dave Marcis	Marcis Auto Racing	Chevrolet	333	0	running	76	$5,725
30	35	44	Rick Wilson	Petty Enterprises	Pontiac	327	0	running	73	$7,315
31	9	8	Sterling Marlin	Stavola Brothers Racing	Ford	321	0	running	70	$10,080
32	8	1	Rick Mast	Precision Products Racing	Ford	316	0	running	67	$9,965
33	20	14	Terry Labonte	Hagan Racing	Chevrolet	299	0	engine	64	$9,875
34	18	55	Ted Musgrave	RaDiUs Motorsports	Ford	257	0	engine	61	$9,815
35	36	52	Mike Skinner	Jimmy Means Racing	Ford	145	0	engine	58	$5,180
36	23	27	Hut Stricklin	Junior Johnson & Associates	Ford	135	0	engine	55	$9,620
37	40	36	H. B. Bailey	Bailey Racing	Pontiac	54	0	engine	52	$5,050
38	38	99	Brad Teague	Ball Motorsports	Chevrolet	13	0	vibration	49	$5,010
39	39	53	Jimmy Means	Jimmy Means Racing	Ford	11	0	handling	46	$4,930
40	37	85	Bob Schacht	Mansion Motorsports	Ford	0	0	did not start	0	$5,760
Official race results

== Standings after the race ==
Drivers' Championship standings

	Pos	Driver	Points
	1	Dale Earnhardt	3,379
	2	Rusty Wallace	3,075 (-304)
	3	Mark Martin	3,072 (-307)
	4	Dale Jarrett	2,987 (–392)
	5	Morgan Shepherd	2,938 (–441)
	6	Kyle Petty	2,732 (–647)
	7	Ken Schrader	2,724 (–655)
1	8	Ernie Irvan	2,692 (–687)
1	9	Geoff Bodine	2,670 (–709)
	10	Jeff Gordon	2,628 (–751)
Official driver's standings

- Note: Only the first 10 positions are included for the driver standings.

Previous race: 1993 Bud 500	NASCAR Winston Cup Series; 1993 season	Next race: 1993 Miller Genuine Draft 400 (Richmond)
