= 1993 Tyson Holly Farms 400 =

26th race of the 1993 NASCAR Winston Cup Series

Race details
- Race 26 of 30 in the 1993 NASCAR Winston Cup Series
- The 1993 Tyson Holly Farms 400 program cover, featuring Geoff Bodine.
- Date: October 3, 1993
- Official name: 44th Annual Tyson Holly Farms 400
- Location: North Wilkesboro Speedway, North Wilkesboro, North Carolina
- Course: Permanent racing facility
- Course length: 0.625 miles (1.006 km)
- Distance: 400 laps, 250 mi (402.336 km)
- Scheduled distance: 400 laps, 250 mi (402.336 km)
- Average speed: 96.92 miles per hour (155.98 km/h)
- Attendance: 45,500

Pole position
| Driver | Ernie Irvan | Robert Yates Racing |
- Time: 19.266

Most laps led
| Driver | Rusty Wallace | Penske Racing South |
- Laps: 181

Winner
| No. 2 | Rusty Wallace | Penske Racing South |

Television in the United States
- Network: ESPN
- Announcers: Bob Jenkins, Ned Jarrett, Benny Parsons

Radio in the United States
- Radio: Motor Racing Network

The 1993 Tyson Holly Farms 400 was the 26th stock car race of the 1993 NASCAR Winston Cup Series season and the 44th iteration of the event. The race was held on Sunday, October 3, 1993, before an audience of 45,500 in North Wilkesboro, North Carolina at the North Wilkesboro Speedway, a 0.625 miles (1.006 km) oval short track. The race took the scheduled 400 laps to complete. At race's end, Penske Racing South driver Rusty Wallace would manage to dominate the late stages of the race to take his 29th career NASCAR Winston Cup Series victory and his eighth victory of the season. To fill out the top three, Richard Childress Racing driver Dale Earnhardt and Robert Yates Racing driver Ernie Irvan would finish second and third, respectively.

== Background ==
The layout of North Wilkesboro Speedway, the venue where the race was held.

North Wilkesboro Speedway is a short oval racetrack located on U.S. Route 421, about five miles east of the town of North Wilkesboro, North Carolina, or 80 miles north of Charlotte. It measures 0.625 mi (1.006 km) and features a unique uphill backstretch and downhill frontstretch. It has previously held races in NASCAR's top three series, including 93 Winston Cup Series races. The track, a NASCAR original, operated from 1949, NASCAR's inception, until the track's original closure in 1996. The speedway briefly reopened in 2010 and hosted several stock car series races before closing again in the spring of 2011. It was re-opened in August 2022 for grassroots racing and returned to NASCAR racing in 2023.

=== Entry list ===
- (R) denotes rookie driver.

| # | Driver | Team | Make |
|---|---|---|---|
| 1 | Rick Mast | Precision Products Racing | Ford |
| 2 | Rusty Wallace | Penske Racing South | Pontiac |
| 3 | Dale Earnhardt | Richard Childress Racing | Chevrolet |
| 4 | Jeff Purvis | Morgan–McClure Motorsports | Chevrolet |
| 5 | Ricky Rudd | Hendrick Motorsports | Chevrolet |
| 6 | Mark Martin | Roush Racing | Ford |
| 7 | Geoff Bodine | Geoff Bodine Racing | Ford |
| 8 | Sterling Marlin | Stavola Brothers Racing | Ford |
| 11 | Bill Elliott | Junior Johnson & Associates | Ford |
| 12 | Jimmy Spencer | Bobby Allison Motorsports | Ford |
| 14 | Terry Labonte | Hagan Racing | Chevrolet |
| 15 | Lake Speed | Bud Moore Engineering | Ford |
| 16 | Wally Dallenbach Jr. | Roush Racing | Ford |
| 17 | Darrell Waltrip | Darrell Waltrip Motorsports | Chevrolet |
| 18 | Dale Jarrett | Joe Gibbs Racing | Chevrolet |
| 21 | Morgan Shepherd | Wood Brothers Racing | Ford |
| 22 | Bobby Labonte (R) | Bill Davis Racing | Ford |
| 24 | Jeff Gordon (R) | Hendrick Motorsports | Chevrolet |
| 25 | Ken Schrader | Hendrick Motorsports | Chevrolet |
| 26 | Brett Bodine | King Racing | Ford |
| 27 | Hut Stricklin | Junior Johnson & Associates | Ford |
| 28 | Ernie Irvan | Robert Yates Racing | Ford |
| 30 | Michael Waltrip | Bahari Racing | Pontiac |
| 33 | Harry Gant | Leo Jackson Motorsports | Chevrolet |
| 37 | Loy Allen Jr. | TriStar Motorsports | Ford |
| 40 | Kenny Wallace (R) | SABCO Racing | Pontiac |
| 41 | Dick Trickle | Larry Hedrick Motorsports | Chevrolet |
| 42 | Kyle Petty | SABCO Racing | Pontiac |
| 44 | Rick Wilson | Petty Enterprises | Pontiac |
| 45 | Rich Bickle | Terminal Trucking Motorsports | Ford |
| 48 | James Hylton | Hylton Motorsports | Pontiac |
| 52 | Jimmy Means | Jimmy Means Racing | Ford |
| 55 | Ted Musgrave | RaDiUs Motorsports | Ford |
| 68 | Greg Sacks | TriStar Motorsports | Ford |
| 71 | Dave Marcis | Marcis Auto Racing | Chevrolet |
| 72 | John Andretti | Tex Racing | Chevrolet |
| 75 | Todd Bodine (R) | Butch Mock Motorsports | Ford |
| 78 | Jay Hedgecock | Triad Motorsports | Ford |
| 90 | Bobby Hillin Jr. | Donlavey Racing | Ford |
| 98 | Derrike Cope | Cale Yarborough Motorsports | Ford |

== Qualifying ==
Qualifying was split into two rounds. The first round was held on Friday, October 1, at 3:00 PM EST. Each driver would have one lap to set a time. During the first round, the top 20 drivers in the round would be guaranteed a starting spot in the race. If a driver was not able to guarantee a spot in the first round, they had the option to scrub their time from the first round and try and run a faster lap time in a second round qualifying run, held on Saturday, October 2, at 11:00 AM EST. As with the first round, each driver would have one lap to set a time. For this specific race, positions 21-32 would be decided on time, and depending on who needed it, a select amount of positions were given to cars who had not otherwise qualified but were high enough in owner's points; up to two were given. If needed, a past champion who did not qualify on either time or provisionals could use a champion's provisional, adding one more spot to the field.

Ernie Irvan, driving for Robert Yates Racing, won the pole, setting a time of 19.266 and an average speed of 116.786 mph (187.949 km/h) in the first round.

Six drivers would fail to qualify.

=== Full qualifying results ===
| Pos. | # | Driver | Team | Make | Time | Speed |
|---|---|---|---|---|---|---|
| 1 | 28 | Ernie Irvan | Robert Yates Racing | Ford | 19.266 | 116.786 |
| 2 | 5 | Ricky Rudd | Hendrick Motorsports | Chevrolet | 19.284 | 116.677 |
| 3 | 42 | Kyle Petty | SABCO Racing | Pontiac | 19.326 | 116.423 |
| 4 | 14 | Terry Labonte | Hagan Racing | Chevrolet | 19.365 | 116.189 |
| 5 | 33 | Harry Gant | Leo Jackson Motorsports | Chevrolet | 19.375 | 116.129 |
| 6 | 6 | Mark Martin | Roush Racing | Ford | 19.379 | 116.105 |
| 7 | 17 | Darrell Waltrip | Darrell Waltrip Motorsports | Chevrolet | 19.408 | 115.932 |
| 8 | 11 | Bill Elliott | Junior Johnson & Associates | Ford | 19.413 | 115.902 |
| 9 | 8 | Sterling Marlin | Stavola Brothers Racing | Ford | 19.417 | 115.878 |
| 10 | 3 | Dale Earnhardt | Richard Childress Racing | Chevrolet | 19.421 | 115.854 |
| 11 | 2 | Rusty Wallace | Penske Racing South | Pontiac | 19.438 | 115.753 |
| 12 | 25 | Ken Schrader | Hendrick Motorsports | Chevrolet | 19.446 | 115.705 |
| 13 | 1 | Rick Mast | Precision Products Racing | Ford | 19.463 | 115.604 |
| 14 | 27 | Hut Stricklin | Junior Johnson & Associates | Ford | 19.465 | 115.592 |
| 15 | 41 | Dick Trickle | Larry Hedrick Motorsports | Chevrolet | 19.470 | 115.562 |
| 16 | 24 | Jeff Gordon (R) | Hendrick Motorsports | Chevrolet | 19.483 | 115.485 |
| 17 | 12 | Jimmy Spencer | Bobby Allison Motorsports | Ford | 19.492 | 115.432 |
| 18 | 55 | Ted Musgrave | RaDiUs Motorsports | Ford | 19.496 | 115.408 |
| 19 | 15 | Lake Speed | Bud Moore Engineering | Ford | 19.504 | 115.361 |
| 20 | 22 | Bobby Labonte (R) | Bill Davis Racing | Ford | 19.528 | 115.219 |
Failed to lock in Round 1
| 21 | 21 | Morgan Shepherd | Wood Brothers Racing | Ford | 19.541 | 115.143 |
| 22 | 40 | Kenny Wallace (R) | SABCO Racing | Pontiac | 19.541 | 115.143 |
| 23 | 7 | Geoff Bodine | Geoff Bodine Racing | Ford | 19.545 | 115.119 |
| 24 | 18 | Dale Jarrett | Joe Gibbs Racing | Chevrolet | 19.551 | 115.084 |
| 25 | 75 | Todd Bodine (R) | Butch Mock Motorsports | Ford | 19.558 | 115.042 |
| 26 | 26 | Brett Bodine | King Racing | Ford | 19.578 | 114.925 |
| 27 | 98 | Derrike Cope | Cale Yarborough Motorsports | Ford | 19.587 | 114.872 |
| 28 | 30 | Michael Waltrip | Bahari Racing | Pontiac | 19.589 | 114.860 |
| 29 | 16 | Wally Dallenbach Jr. | Roush Racing | Ford | 19.634 | 114.597 |
| 30 | 78 | Jay Hedgecock | Triad Motorsports | Ford | 19.643 | 114.545 |
| 31 | 72 | John Andretti | Tex Racing | Chevrolet | 19.649 | 114.510 |
| 32 | 90 | Bobby Hillin Jr. | Donlavey Racing | Ford | 19.675 | 114.358 |
Provisionals
| 33 | 4 | Jeff Purvis | Morgan–McClure Motorsports | Chevrolet | 19.684 | 114.306 |
| 34 | 44 | Rick Wilson | Petty Enterprises | Pontiac | 19.773 | 113.792 |
Failed to qualify
| 35 | 52 | Jimmy Means | Jimmy Means Racing | Ford | -* | -* |
| 36 | 48 | James Hylton | Hylton Motorsports | Pontiac | -* | -* |
| 37 | 71 | Dave Marcis | Marcis Auto Racing | Chevrolet | -* | -* |
| 38 | 68 | Greg Sacks | TriStar Motorsports | Ford | -* | -* |
| 39 | 45 | Rich Bickle | Terminal Trucking Motorsports | Ford | -* | -* |
| 40 | 37 | Loy Allen Jr. | TriStar Motorsports | Ford | -* | -* |
Official first round qualifying results
Official starting lineup

== Race results ==
| Fin | St | # | Driver | Team | Make | Laps | Led | Status | Pts | Winnings |
|---|---|---|---|---|---|---|---|---|---|---|
| 1 | 11 | 2 | Rusty Wallace | Penske Racing South | Pontiac | 400 | 181 | running | 185 | $46,260 |
| 2 | 10 | 3 | Dale Earnhardt | Richard Childress Racing | Chevrolet | 400 | 59 | running | 175 | $46,285 |
| 3 | 1 | 28 | Ernie Irvan | Robert Yates Racing | Ford | 400 | 0 | running | 165 | $39,435 |
| 4 | 3 | 42 | Kyle Petty | SABCO Racing | Pontiac | 400 | 55 | running | 165 | $20,085 |
| 5 | 2 | 5 | Ricky Rudd | Hendrick Motorsports | Chevrolet | 399 | 23 | running | 160 | $21,235 |
| 6 | 5 | 33 | Harry Gant | Leo Jackson Motorsports | Chevrolet | 398 | 0 | running | 150 | $21,235 |
| 7 | 4 | 14 | Terry Labonte | Hagan Racing | Chevrolet | 398 | 53 | running | 151 | $15,660 |
| 8 | 13 | 1 | Rick Mast | Precision Products Racing | Ford | 397 | 22 | running | 147 | $12,805 |
| 9 | 24 | 18 | Dale Jarrett | Joe Gibbs Racing | Chevrolet | 397 | 2 | running | 143 | $14,455 |
| 10 | 12 | 25 | Ken Schrader | Hendrick Motorsports | Chevrolet | 397 | 0 | running | 134 | $14,560 |
| 11 | 7 | 17 | Darrell Waltrip | Darrell Waltrip Motorsports | Chevrolet | 397 | 0 | running | 130 | $15,980 |
| 12 | 20 | 22 | Bobby Labonte (R) | Bill Davis Racing | Ford | 396 | 1 | running | 132 | $9,730 |
| 13 | 17 | 12 | Jimmy Spencer | Bobby Allison Motorsports | Ford | 396 | 0 | running | 124 | $11,480 |
| 14 | 28 | 30 | Michael Waltrip | Bahari Racing | Pontiac | 396 | 0 | running | 121 | $11,130 |
| 15 | 29 | 16 | Wally Dallenbach Jr. | Roush Racing | Ford | 395 | 1 | running | 123 | $11,230 |
| 16 | 6 | 6 | Mark Martin | Roush Racing | Ford | 395 | 0 | running | 115 | $13,455 |
| 17 | 19 | 15 | Lake Speed | Bud Moore Engineering | Ford | 395 | 0 | running | 112 | $13,355 |
| 18 | 8 | 11 | Bill Elliott | Junior Johnson & Associates | Ford | 394 | 0 | running | 109 | $15,530 |
| 19 | 9 | 8 | Sterling Marlin | Stavola Brothers Racing | Ford | 394 | 0 | running | 106 | $10,305 |
| 20 | 27 | 98 | Derrike Cope | Cale Yarborough Motorsports | Ford | 391 | 3 | running | 108 | $10,680 |
| 21 | 26 | 26 | Brett Bodine | King Racing | Ford | 390 | 0 | running | 100 | $9,980 |
| 22 | 32 | 90 | Bobby Hillin Jr. | Donlavey Racing | Ford | 388 | 0 | running | 97 | $5,080 |
| 23 | 25 | 75 | Todd Bodine (R) | Butch Mock Motorsports | Ford | 382 | 0 | running | 94 | $4,930 |
| 24 | 31 | 72 | John Andretti | Tex Racing | Chevrolet | 380 | 0 | running | 91 | $7,880 |
| 25 | 33 | 4 | Jeff Purvis | Morgan–McClure Motorsports | Chevrolet | 380 | 0 | running | 88 | $14,530 |
| 26 | 30 | 78 | Jay Hedgecock | Triad Motorsports | Ford | 372 | 0 | running | 85 | $4,780 |
| 27 | 22 | 40 | Kenny Wallace (R) | SABCO Racing | Pontiac | 364 | 0 | running | 82 | $6,955 |
| 28 | 14 | 27 | Hut Stricklin | Junior Johnson & Associates | Ford | 359 | 0 | running | 79 | $9,290 |
| 29 | 18 | 55 | Ted Musgrave | RaDiUs Motorsports | Ford | 341 | 0 | running | 76 | $9,230 |
| 30 | 15 | 41 | Dick Trickle | Larry Hedrick Motorsports | Chevrolet | 340 | 0 | running | 73 | $5,830 |
| 31 | 23 | 7 | Geoff Bodine | Geoff Bodine Racing | Ford | 256 | 0 | handling | 70 | $13,605 |
| 32 | 21 | 21 | Morgan Shepherd | Wood Brothers Racing | Ford | 252 | 0 | running | 67 | $8,705 |
| 33 | 34 | 44 | Rick Wilson | Petty Enterprises | Pontiac | 246 | 0 | running | 64 | $5,730 |
| 34 | 16 | 24 | Jeff Gordon (R) | Hendrick Motorsports | Chevrolet | 117 | 0 | handling | 61 | $5,655 |
Official race results

== Standings after the race ==
Drivers' Championship standings

| | Pos | Driver | Points |
|---|---|---|---|
| | 1 | Dale Earnhardt | 3,877 |
| | 2 | Rusty Wallace | 3,805 (-72) |
| | 3 | Dale Jarrett | 3,571 (-306) |
| | 4 | Mark Martin | 3,527 (–523) |
| | 5 | Morgan Shepherd | 3,354 (–587) |
| 1 | 6 | Kyle Petty | 3,290 (–593) |
| 1 | 7 | Ken Schrader | 3,284 (–685) |
| 1 | 8 | Ernie Irvan | 3,192 (–727) |
| 1 | 9 | Bill Elliott | 3,150 (–821) |
| 3 | 10 | Ricky Rudd | 3,056 (–828) |
Official driver's standings

- Note: Only the first 10 positions are included for the driver standings.

| Previous race: 1993 Goody's 500 | NASCAR Winston Cup Series; 1993 season | Next race: 1993 Mello Yello 500 |
