= 1993 Bud 500 =

21st race of the 1993 NASCAR Winston Cup Series

Race details
- Race 21 of 30 in the 1993 NASCAR Winston Cup Series
- The 1993 Bud 500 program cover, featuring Bill Elliott.
- Date: August 28, 1993
- Official name: 33rd Annual Bud 500
- Location: Bristol, Tennessee, Bristol Motor Speedway
- Course: Permanent racing facility
- Course length: 0.533 miles (0.858 km)
- Distance: 500 laps, 266.5 mi (428.89 km)
- Scheduled distance: 500 laps, 266.5 mi (428.89 km)
- Average speed: 88.172 miles per hour (141.899 km/h)
- Attendance: 72,500

Pole position
Driver	Mark Martin	Roush Racing
- Time: 15.805

Most laps led
Driver	Rusty Wallace	Penske Racing South
- Laps: 409

Winner
No. 6	Mark Martin	Roush Racing

Television in the United States
- Network: ESPN
- Announcers: Bob Jenkins, Ned Jarrett, Benny Parsons

Radio in the United States
- Radio: Performance Racing Network

The 1993 Bud 500 was the 21st stock car race of the 1993 NASCAR Winston Cup Series season and the 33rd iteration of the event. The race was held on Saturday, August 28, 1993, before a crowd of 72,500 in Bristol, Tennessee at Bristol Motor Speedway, a 0.533 miles (0.858 km) permanent oval-shaped racetrack. The race took the scheduled 500 laps to complete. In the closing laps of the race, Roush Racing driver Mark Martin would manage to make a late-race charge on the dominant Penske Racing South driver Rusty Wallace, passing him for the lead with 13 to go, completing a comeback victory from two laps down earlier in the race. The victory was Martin's tenth career NASCAR Winston Cup Series victory, his third victory of the season, and his third consecutive victory. To fill out the top three, the aforementioned Wallace and Richard Childress Racing driver Dale Earnhardt would finish second and third, respectively.

== Background ==
The layout of Bristol Motor Speedway, the venue where the race was held.

The Bristol Motor Speedway, formerly known as Bristol International Raceway and Bristol Raceway, is a NASCAR short track venue located in Bristol, Tennessee. Constructed in 1960, it held its first NASCAR race on July 30, 1961. Despite its short length, Bristol is among the most popular tracks on the NASCAR schedule because of its distinct features, which include extraordinarily steep banking, an all concrete surface, two pit roads, and stadium-like seating. It has also been named one of the loudest NASCAR tracks.

=== Entry list ===
- (R) denotes rookie driver.

#	Driver	Team	Make
1	Rick Mast	Precision Products Racing	Ford
2	Rusty Wallace	Penske Racing South	Pontiac
3	Dale Earnhardt	Richard Childress Racing	Chevrolet
4	Ernie Irvan	Morgan–McClure Motorsports	Chevrolet
5	Ricky Rudd	Hendrick Motorsports	Chevrolet
6	Mark Martin	Roush Racing	Ford
7	Jimmy Hensley	AK Racing	Ford
8	Sterling Marlin	Stavola Brothers Racing	Ford
9	P. J. Jones (R)	Melling Racing	Ford
11	Bill Elliott	Junior Johnson & Associates	Ford
12	Jimmy Spencer	Bobby Allison Motorsports	Ford
14	Terry Labonte	Hagan Racing	Chevrolet
15	Geoff Bodine	Bud Moore Engineering	Ford
16	Wally Dallenbach Jr.	Roush Racing	Ford
17	Darrell Waltrip	Darrell Waltrip Motorsports	Chevrolet
18	Dale Jarrett	Joe Gibbs Racing	Chevrolet
20	Bobby Hamilton	Moroso Racing	Ford
21	Morgan Shepherd	Wood Brothers Racing	Ford
22	Bobby Labonte (R)	Bill Davis Racing	Ford
24	Jeff Gordon (R)	Hendrick Motorsports	Chevrolet
25	Ken Schrader	Hendrick Motorsports	Chevrolet
26	Brett Bodine	King Racing	Ford
27	Hut Stricklin	Junior Johnson & Associates	Ford
28	Lake Speed	Robert Yates Racing	Ford
30	Michael Waltrip	Bahari Racing	Pontiac
33	Harry Gant	Leo Jackson Motorsports	Chevrolet
40	Kenny Wallace (R)	SABCO Racing	Pontiac
41	Phil Parsons	Larry Hedrick Motorsports	Chevrolet
42	Kyle Petty	SABCO Racing	Pontiac
44	Rick Wilson	Petty Enterprises	Pontiac
45	Rich Bickle	Terminal Trucking Motorsports	Ford
52	Jimmy Means	Jimmy Means Racing	Ford
55	Ted Musgrave	RaDiUs Motorsports	Ford
68	Greg Sacks	TriStar Motorsports	Ford
71	Dave Marcis	Marcis Auto Racing	Chevrolet
75	Todd Bodine (R)	Butch Mock Motorsports	Ford
90	Bobby Hillin Jr.	Donlavey Racing	Ford
98	Derrike Cope	Cale Yarborough Motorsports	Ford

== Qualifying ==
Qualifying was originally scheduled to be split into two rounds. The first round was scheduled to be held on Friday, August 27, at 5:30 PM EST. However, due to rain, the first round was cancelled, and qualifying was condensed into one round, which was held on Saturday, August 28, at 1:30 PM EST. Each driver would have one lap to set a time. For this specific race, positions 1-32 would be decided on time, and depending on who needed it, a select amount of positions were given to cars who had not otherwise qualified but were high enough in owner's points; up to two provisionals were given. If needed, a past champion who did not qualify on either time or provisionals could use a champion's provisional, adding one more spot to the field.

Mark Martin, driving for Roush Racing, won the pole, setting a time of 15.805 and an average speed of 121.405 mph (195.382 km/h).

Four drivers would fail to qualify.

=== Full qualifying results ===
Pos.	#	Driver	Team	Make	Time	Speed
1	6	Mark Martin	Roush Racing	Ford	15.805	121.405
2	2	Rusty Wallace	Penske Racing South	Pontiac	15.909	120.611
3	5	Ricky Rudd	Hendrick Motorsports	Chevrolet	15.950	120.301
4	22	Bobby Labonte (R)	Bill Davis Racing	Ford	16.009	119.858
5	27	Hut Stricklin	Junior Johnson & Associates	Ford	16.011	119.843
6	44	Rick Wilson	Petty Enterprises	Pontiac	16.014	119.820
7	98	Derrike Cope	Cale Yarborough Motorsports	Ford	16.034	119.671
8	24	Jeff Gordon (R)	Hendrick Motorsports	Chevrolet	16.039	119.633
9	7	Jimmy Hensley	AK Racing	Ford	16.043	119.604
10	33	Harry Gant	Leo Jackson Motorsports	Chevrolet	16.054	119.522
11	15	Geoff Bodine	Bud Moore Engineering	Ford	16.060	119.477
12	1	Rick Mast	Precision Products Racing	Ford	16.067	119.425
13	26	Brett Bodine	King Racing	Ford	16.097	119.202
14	11	Bill Elliott	Junior Johnson & Associates	Ford	16.118	119.047
15	20	Bobby Hamilton	Moroso Racing	Ford	16.123	119.010
16	21	Morgan Shepherd	Wood Brothers Racing	Ford	16.142	118.870
17	17	Darrell Waltrip	Darrell Waltrip Motorsports	Chevrolet	16.162	118.723
18	14	Terry Labonte	Hagan Racing	Chevrolet	16.165	118.701
19	3	Dale Earnhardt	Richard Childress Racing	Chevrolet	16.169	118.672
20	42	Kyle Petty	SABCO Racing	Pontiac	16.182	118.576
21	28	Lake Speed	Robert Yates Racing	Ford	16.205	118.408
22	16	Wally Dallenbach Jr.	Roush Racing	Ford	16.206	118.401
23	40	Kenny Wallace (R)	SABCO Racing	Pontiac	16.206	118.401
24	30	Michael Waltrip	Bahari Racing	Pontiac	16.220	118.298
25	41	Phil Parsons	Larry Hedrick Motorsports	Chevrolet	16.246	118.109
26	25	Ken Schrader	Hendrick Motorsports	Chevrolet	16.264	117.978
27	52	Jimmy Means	Jimmy Means Racing	Ford	16.283	117.841
28	68	Greg Sacks	TriStar Motorsports	Ford	16.309	117.653
29	71	Dave Marcis	Marcis Auto Racing	Chevrolet	16.324	117.545
30	8	Sterling Marlin	Stavola Brothers Racing	Ford	16.328	117.516
31	90	Bobby Hillin Jr.	Donlavey Racing	Ford	16.332	117.487
32	12	Jimmy Spencer	Bobby Allison Motorsports	Ford	16.350	117.358
Provisionals
33	18	Dale Jarrett	Joe Gibbs Racing	Chevrolet	-*	-*
34	4	Ernie Irvan	Morgan–McClure Motorsports	Chevrolet	-*	-*
Failed to qualify
35	55	Ted Musgrave	RaDiUs Motorsports	Ford	-*	-*
36	75	Todd Bodine (R)	Butch Mock Motorsports	Ford	-*	-*
37	9	P. J. Jones (R)	Melling Racing	Ford	-*	-*
38	45	Rich Bickle	Terminal Trucking Motorsports	Ford	-*	-*
Official starting lineup

== Race results ==
Fin	St	#	Driver	Team	Make	Laps	Led	Status	Pts	Winnings
1	1	6	Mark Martin	Roush Racing	Ford	500	67	running	180	$80,125
2	2	2	Rusty Wallace	Penske Racing South	Pontiac	500	409	running	180	$31,875
3	19	3	Dale Earnhardt	Richard Childress Racing	Chevrolet	500	0	running	165	$32,325
4	10	33	Harry Gant	Leo Jackson Motorsports	Chevrolet	500	0	running	160	$28,150
5	12	1	Rick Mast	Precision Products Racing	Ford	500	1	running	160	$22,000
6	9	7	Jimmy Hensley	AK Racing	Ford	500	0	running	150	$22,075
7	13	26	Brett Bodine	King Racing	Ford	500	0	running	146	$16,925
8	11	15	Geoff Bodine	Bud Moore Engineering	Ford	500	0	running	142	$18,925
9	23	40	Kenny Wallace (R)	SABCO Racing	Pontiac	499	0	running	138	$12,600
10	24	30	Michael Waltrip	Bahari Racing	Pontiac	498	0	running	134	$17,600
11	14	11	Bill Elliott	Junior Johnson & Associates	Ford	498	0	running	130	$19,300
12	31	90	Bobby Hillin Jr.	Donlavey Racing	Ford	497	0	running	127	$8,900
13	16	21	Morgan Shepherd	Wood Brothers Racing	Ford	497	0	running	124	$14,550
14	25	41	Phil Parsons	Larry Hedrick Motorsports	Chevrolet	497	0	running	121	$11,300
15	4	22	Bobby Labonte (R)	Bill Davis Racing	Ford	495	0	running	118	$12,500
16	21	28	Lake Speed	Robert Yates Racing	Ford	493	0	running	115	$18,350
17	29	71	Dave Marcis	Marcis Auto Racing	Chevrolet	484	0	running	112	$8,300
18	27	52	Jimmy Means	Jimmy Means Racing	Ford	483	0	running	109	$8,250
19	28	68	Greg Sacks	TriStar Motorsports	Ford	483	0	running	106	$8,240
20	8	24	Jeff Gordon (R)	Hendrick Motorsports	Chevrolet	466	0	running	103	$11,450
21	22	16	Wally Dallenbach Jr.	Roush Racing	Ford	437	0	running	100	$13,000
22	3	5	Ricky Rudd	Hendrick Motorsports	Chevrolet	414	0	running	97	$13,900
23	30	8	Sterling Marlin	Stavola Brothers Racing	Ford	374	0	running	94	$12,750
24	26	25	Ken Schrader	Hendrick Motorsports	Chevrolet	354	0	running	91	$12,575
25	32	12	Jimmy Spencer	Bobby Allison Motorsports	Ford	325	0	running	88	$12,430
26	34	4	Ernie Irvan	Morgan–McClure Motorsports	Chevrolet	316	0	engine	85	$17,650
27	7	98	Derrike Cope	Cale Yarborough Motorsports	Ford	292	0	handling	82	$12,325
28	6	44	Rick Wilson	Petty Enterprises	Pontiac	274	0	crash	79	$9,250
29	17	17	Darrell Waltrip	Darrell Waltrip Motorsports	Chevrolet	246	0	running	76	$17,450
30	20	42	Kyle Petty	SABCO Racing	Pontiac	207	23	handling	78	$16,600
31	33	18	Dale Jarrett	Joe Gibbs Racing	Chevrolet	199	0	rear end	70	$15,600
32	5	27	Hut Stricklin	Junior Johnson & Associates	Ford	83	0	crash	67	$12,150
33	15	20	Bobby Hamilton	Moroso Racing	Ford	30	0	crash	64	$7,600
34	18	14	Terry Labonte	Hagan Racing	Chevrolet	30	0	crash	61	$12,125
Official race results

== Standings after the race ==
Drivers' Championship standings

	Pos	Driver	Points
	1	Dale Earnhardt	3,214
1	2	Rusty Wallace	2,905 (-309)
1	3	Mark Martin	2,887 (-327)
2	4	Dale Jarrett	2,860 (–354)
	5	Morgan Shepherd	2,796 (–418)
	6	Kyle Petty	2,619 (–597)
	7	Ken Schrader	2,581 (–633)
1	8	Geoff Bodine	2,567 (–647)
1	9	Ernie Irvan	2,532 (–682)
	10	Jeff Gordon	2,526 (–688)
Official driver's standings

- Note: Only the first 10 positions are included for the driver standings.

Previous race: 1993 Champion Spark Plug 400	NASCAR Winston Cup Series; 1993 season	Next race: 1993 Mountain Dew Southern 500
