= Jeff Purvis =

American racing driver (born 1959)

- Born: February 19, 1959 (age 67); Clarksville, Tennessee, U.S.
- Achievements: 1983, 1984, 1986 World 100 Winner; 1995 Snowball Derby Winner; 1991, 1992, 1995 All American 400 Winner; 1986 NASCAR Busch All-Star Super Series Champion
- Awards: National Dirt Late Model Hall of Fame (2001)

NASCAR Cup Series career
- 50 races run over 9 years
- Best finish: 39th (1993)
- First race: 1990 Hanes Activewear 500 (Martinsville)
- Last race: 2001 EA Sports 500 (Talladega)
| Wins | Top tens | Poles |
|---|---|---|
| 0 | 0 | 0 |

NASCAR O'Reilly Auto Parts Series career
- 187 races run over 15 years
- Best finish: 6th (1999)
- First race: 1989 All Pro Auto Parts 300 (Charlotte)
- Last race: 2004 Goulds Pumps/ITT Industries 200 (Nazareth)
- First win: 1996 Hardee's Fried Chicken 250 (Richmond)
- Last win: 2002 O'Reilly 300 (Texas)
| Wins | Top tens | Poles |
|---|---|---|
| 4 | 57 | 6 |
- Statistics up to date as of April 20, 2013.

Jeffery Purvis (born February 19, 1959) is an American former race car driver in the NASCAR Xfinity Series. He is a fifteen-year veteran with four wins and 25 top-five finishes. He suffered a massive brain injury after a 2002 crash and has not run a NASCAR-sanctioned race since 2004. Before coming to NASCAR he was an accomplished dirt track racer winning the World 100 at Eldora Speedway on three occasions - 1983, 1984, and 1986.

== NASCAR career ==
=== Winston Cup Series ===
Purvis made his NASCAR debut in 1990. He was hired to drive Bobby Allison's No. 12 Raybestos Buick at Martinsville Speedway. He started in 31st position for that race, but crashed out and finished 28th. After that, Purvis raced four more times in 1990 in the No. 51 Plasti-Kote Chevrolet owned by James Finch, who once owned his cars when he raced late model dirt races. His best finish among those was 31st at North Wilkesboro. He also set his best start of 1990 there, 24th.

Purvis would run six races for Finch in 1991. His best start of that year was 22nd. He set his career best finish to that date at Atlanta. After starting 29th, Purvis completed many laps and finished in the 24th position. He only finished two races that season.

Once again, Purvis would race six times in 1992. He ran two races for Finch finishing 27th at Michigan and 36th at Phoenix. He ran four more races for the No. 12 Raybestos Brakes Chevy for Bobby Allison. His highlight was his career-best finish of 22nd at Richmond.

In 1993, Purvis ran the most races in a season for his career. Making eight starts, Purvis ran three races for Finch and five races for Morgan-McClure Motorsports in their No. 4 Eastman Kodak Chevy. At Talladega in July, Purvis was able to top his previous best start with a 21st, as well as enjoy the best runs of his career. He earned his best qualifying effort of 18th at Richmond and quickly followed it up with his career-best 16th-place finish. The next week, he broke his best finish again with a thirteenth place finish at Dover and also added a seventeenth at Martinsville.

In 1994, Finch picked up sponsorship for the No. 51 from Country Time, and Purvis raced in the Chevy for six races, replacing original driver Neil Bonnett, who was killed in a practice accident for the Daytona 500. His best finish of the year came in his first start of 1994. At Atlanta, Purvis finished 21st. However, at Michigan, Purvis was able to break his best start record, with a thirteenth place start in the race. In the fall race at Michigan, Purvis made the race with T.W. Taylor's No. 02 Ford. He started that race in 23rd and finished 28th.

Finch once again found sponsorship from Jackaroo BBQ Sauces for the renumbered No. 44 Chevy. Purvis raced six races again for Finch in 1995. They struggled, and the best finish for Finch and Purvis was a 29th at Talladega, though once again he set a personal best qualifying effort of twelfth. In the fall Atlanta race, Purvis drove for Rick Hendrick and the No. 58 Leukemia Society Chevy at Atlanta, finishing 26th, his best finish of the year.

Despite only racing four races for Finch in 1996, the No. 44 MCA Records Chevy had their best season effort. In the 1996 Daytona 500, Purvis increased his best career finish to twelfth place, where it stands today. He also earned two top-ten qualifying efforts in 1996, the better being his best career start of sixth at the Pepsi 400.

In 1997, with Purvis driving for himself in the Busch Series, he drove his No. 12 Chevy into three races. He mustered only a 37th, 38th and 39th in those efforts, but did start eighth for the fall race at Charlotte.

After a three-year absence from the elite division of NASCAR, Purvis returned for his final season in 2001. Purvis was able to make four races in the No. 51 owned by Finch, who bought Fords from Bill Elliott Racing. He started in the top-twenty for three of the four races, but his best finish of the year was a 34th in the No. 51 Subway Ford at Talladega.

=== Busch Series career ===
While racing with Finch's Phoenix Racing many years in the Cup Series, Purvis also competed in the Busch Series for Finch.

In 1989, Purvis made his debut at Charlotte driving the No. 49 Phoenix Racing Buick. He made the field after qualifying in fourteenth. However, engine problems forced him to take fortieth place in the 42 car field, ending his debut.

In 1990, Phoenix Racing and Purvis once again teamed up, with Purvis driving the No. 15 Buick. In four races, he finished 26th twice (Bristol and Charlotte) and had a best qualifying effort of 22nd at Richmond. The next year, Purvis added four more races to his Busch career, driving Finch's No. 23 Seal-Tech Buick. At Charlotte, he set his career best finish with a seventeenth place. However, he did not finish in any of his four starts. For the third straight season, Purvis competed in four Busch events in 1992. At Talladega, he drove Finch's No. 51 to his first NASCAR top-ten, a seventh place after a 27th place start. Then, Robert Yates Racing offered Purvis a ride in the No. 28 Texaco Ford for three races, finishing 12th, 20th, and 21st. Also, at Darlington, Purvis matched his career best qualifying effort of 14th.

Purvis ran two races in 1993, both with Morgan-McClure Motorsports, who he was also racing with in the Cup Series. He qualified in 11th and seventh for both races, with the seventh at Atlanta being his career best. In 1994, Country Time Lemonade sponsored Finch and Purvis in the Busch Series in a four-race deal. At Talladega Superspeedway, Purvis and Finch collected their first career Busch Pole Award. Purvis ran up front all day, and finished in fifth position. However, that was the only race he finished, with his next best finish in 1994 being a 29th. However, he qualified fourth at Bristol and ninth at Richmond.

In 1995, Finch and Morgan-McClure decided to resurrect the No. 4 Kodak Busch Series car. Purvis would drive the car in nine races, the most starts in a season to date. Purvis had a career season, finishing ninth at Atlanta and Charlotte, 12th at Michigan, and then back at Charlotte, he set his career best finish of third. He also won the pole at Talladega once again, setting his sights on a full 1996.

In 1996, Purvis and Finch got a new sponsorship deal with MCA Records for five races in 1996. Even without sponsorship for the other 21 races, Purvis got a shot from Finch to do the whole 1996 schedule. Immediately, he won the pole for two of the first three races, at Daytona and Richmond. He finished third at Rockingham in the second race of the season. Then after winning the pole at Richmond, Purvis led 38 laps and shot by Joe Nemechek for his first career Busch Series win. Despite a disappointing mid-season, Purvis rebounded with a second-place finish at Myrtle Beach, sixth at Talladega, and a seventh at IRP. After the seventh at IRP, Purvis rolled on to Michigan, where, after blowing past a fading Mark Martin, he held off Terry Labonte for the second win of his career. By season's end, Purvis had seven top-tens in 26 starts, earning seventh place in the final standings.

Purvis and Finch looked toward 1997 with high hopes, but Finch informed Purvis that the team could not run a full season without solid sponsorship. After running the first four races, and only a ninth at Daytona to show for it, Finch and Purvis parted. Purvis went and teamed with Larry Lockamy to drive the No. 28 Opryland Chevy for a handful of races. At Nashville Speedway USA, Purvis made his first start in the No. 28 and showed off with a fourth place finish. Back at Myrtle Beach, Purvis started second and finished eighth. Meanwhile, Finch was finalizing his deal to get Purvis back. At Homestead-Miami, Purvis debuted the No. 4 Lance Snacks Chevy, but finished 38th in the race. Despite only running ten races, the three top-10s allowed Purvis to finish 44th in points.

Lance Snacks was on board with Purvis and Finch for a full season in 1998, and the season started off well. Purvis started fourth, and finished second at Daytona. He had five other top-fives, including the Milwaukee, where he started on the pole and finished third. An incident at South Boston cost Purvis any chance of finishing in the top-ten in points. Mark Green and Purvis had been racing hard, making contact several times. After Green spun Purvis out, Purvis rammed Green's car on pit road. That forced him out of the race and out of four races due to suspension. Matt Hutter and Nathan Buttke took his place. Following his return, Purvis finished in the top-ten four straight times, allowing him to finish 15th in points despite missing five races.

In 1999, Purvis moved to Diamond Ridge Motorsports. He had two less top-fives than in 1998, but two more top-tens, as well as being able to run every race. A third place at Talladega was his best finish of 1999, but the consistency allowed for Purvis to finish sixth in points, bettering his 1996 standing. Even with the solid 1999, Purvis's job was in jeopardy.

However, Joe Gibbs Racing merged with Diamond Ridge, and picked up the No. 4 team for 2000. They switched the car to Pontiacs and gained sponsor Porter-Cable after Lance left. Purvis finished 2nd three times at Milwaukee Mile, Gateway and IRP. He also finished third at Talladega. However, Purvis's new team could not qualify at Charlotte and Darlington. Unfortunately, Purvis was injured at Myrtle Beach and could not race at Watkins Glen. Curtis Markham replaced him for that race. Despite not making three races, Purvis finished a respectable 11th in points, with four top-fives and eleven top-tens.

In 2001, Gibbs decided to team Purvis up with Mike McLaughlin and Purvis would drive the No. 18 MBNA Pontiac. In seventeen races with the team, Purvis managed a second at Fontana and four other top-tens. After Milwaukee race, Purvis was running 7th in points. However, Mike McLaughlin's team had to fold and with two drivers and one spot open, Purvis was released from JGR. Purvis did not run in the next two races, but Richard Childress had his No. 21 Rockwell Automation Chevy open for most of the summer. After finishing fifteenth at Gateway, Purvis headed to Pikes Peak International Raceway. After starting seventh, Purvis dominated, leading half of the laps, and easily cruised to his third career Busch Series win. It was his first win in nearly five years. Despite the win, Purvis only made one start with the team after that at IRP, and was sent searching for a win again. Purvis was able to gain the No. 59 Kingsford Chevrolet ride at ST Motorsports. He made three starts with the team, finishing 5th at Memphis and also had finishes of 14th and 17th.

Brewco Motorsports hired Purvis to drive the No. 37 Timber Wolf Chevy in 2002. In twelve starts for the team, Purvis finished in the top-twenty five times. During one of those races at Texas Motor Speedway, Jack Sprague had dominated all day. Some drivers left the race when it began raining, though Purvis continued. Four laps later, the rain stopped and Purvis won his fourth and final career win when the race could not restart.

Six races later, at Nazareth Speedway, Purvis was among the top-fifteen drivers, when he blew his engine and spun in his own oil on the backstraightaway. As Purvis' car came to a rest, Greg Biffle slid in Purvis's oil and struck his car causing Purvis to suffer severe head trauma.

== Car accident ==
On August 5, 2006, while on his way to a crate race at Talladega short track, Purvis was involved in a crash on I-65 near Cullman, Alabama. His race hauler he was riding in blew a front tire and crossed the median and collided with a vehicle on the northbound side of the interstate. Purvis suffered a broken neck and broken ribs and cuts and bruises and was taken to Cullman Regional Medical Center where he was then airlifted to Vanderbilt University Medical Center in Nashville, Tennessee. His wife and son were also injured.

== Motorsports career results ==
=== NASCAR ===
(key) (Bold – Pole position awarded by qualifying time. Italics – Pole position earned by points standings or practice time. * – Most laps led.)

==== Winston Cup Series ====
NASCAR Winston Cup Series results
| Year | Team | No. | Make | 1 | 2 | 3 | 4 | 5 | 6 | 7 | 8 | 9 | 10 | 11 | 12 | 13 | 14 | 15 | 16 | 17 | 18 | 19 | 20 | 21 | 22 | 23 | 24 | 25 | 26 | 27 | 28 | 29 | 30 | 31 | 32 | 33 | 34 | 35 | 36 | NWCC | Pts | Ref |
|---|---|---|---|---|---|---|---|---|---|---|---|---|---|---|---|---|---|---|---|---|---|---|---|---|---|---|---|---|---|---|---|---|---|---|---|---|---|---|---|---|---|---|
| 1990 | Bobby Allison Motorsports | 12 | Buick | DAY | RCH | CAR | ATL | DAR | BRI | NWS | MAR; 28 | TAL | CLT | DOV | SON | POC | MCH | DAY | POC | TAL | GLN | MCH | BRI | DAR | RCH | | | | | | | | | | | | | | | 55th | 238 | |
| 1990 | Phoenix Racing | 51 | Chevy | | | | | | | | | | | | | | | | | | | | | | | DOV; 33 | MAR | NWS; 31 | CLT | CAR; 38 | PHO; 36 | ATL | | | | | | | | 55th | 238 | |
| 1991 | Phoenix Racing | 51 | Olds | DAY; 36 | RCH | CAR; 35 | ATL; 24 | DAR | BRI | NWS; DNQ | MAR | TAL; 30 | CLT | DOV | SON | POC | MCH; DNQ | DAY; 30 | POC | TAL; DNQ | GLN | MCH | BRI | DAR | RCH | DOV; DNQ | MAR | NWS | | | | | | | | | | | | 45th | 399 | |
| 1991 | Phoenix Racing | 51 | Chevy | | | | | | | | | | | | | | | | | | | | | | | | | | CLT; DNQ | CAR | PHO; 38 | ATL | | | | | | | | 45th | 399 | |
| 1992 | Phoenix Racing | 51 | Chevy | DAY | CAR | RCH | ATL | DAR | BRI | NWS | MAR | TAL | CLT | DOV | SON | POC | MCH | DAY | POC | TAL | GLN | MCH; 27 | BRI | DAR | | | | | | | PHO; 36 | ATL | | | | | | | | 44th | 453 | |
| 1992 | Bobby Allison Motorsports | 12 | Chevy | | | | | | | | | | | | | | | | | | | | | | RCH; 22 | DOV; 32 | MAR; 26 | NWS; 32 | CLT | CAR | | | | | | | | | | 44th | 453 | |
| 1993 | Phoenix Racing | 51 | Chevy | DAY; DNQ | CAR | RCH | ATL | DAR | BRI | NWS | MAR | TAL; 39 | SON | CLT | DOV | POC | MCH | DAY; 23 | NHA | POC | TAL; 21 | GLN | MCH | BRI | | | | | | | | | | | | | | | | 39th | 774 | |
| 1993 | Morgan-McClure Motorsports | 4 | Chevy | | | | | | | | | | | | | | | | | | | | | | DAR; 26 | RCH; 16 | DOV; 13 | MAR; 17 | NWS; 25 | CLT | CAR | PHO | ATL | | | | | | | 39th | 774 | |
| 1994 | Phoenix Racing | 51 | Chevy | DAY | CAR | RCH | ATL; 21 | DAR | BRI | NWS | MAR | TAL; 35 | SON | CLT | DOV | POC | MCH; 27 | DAY; 38 | NHA | POC | TAL; 36 | IND; 34 | GLN | | | | | | | | | | PHO; DNQ | ATL | | | | | | 46th | 484 | |
| 1994 | Taylor Racing | 02 | Ford | | | | | | | | | | | | | | | | | | | | | MCH; 28 | BRI | DAR | RCH | DOV | MAR | NWS | CLT | CAR | | | | | | | | 46th | 484 | |
| 1995 | Phoenix Racing | 44 | Chevy | DAY; 38 | CAR | RCH | ATL; 37 | DAR | BRI | | | TAL; 29 | SON | CLT; DNQ | DOV | POC | MCH; 39 | DAY; 39 | NHA | POC | TAL; 42 | IND; DNQ | GLN | MCH | BRI | DAR | RCH | DOV | MAR | NWS | CLT; DNQ | CAR | PHO | ATL; DNQ | | | | | | 47th | 391 | |
| 1995 | Junior Johnson & Associates | 27 | Ford | | | | | | | NWS; DNQ | MAR | | | | | | | | | | | | | | | | | | | | | | | | | | | | | 47th | 391 | |
| 1995 | Hendrick Motorsports | 58 | Chevy | | | | | | | | | | | | | | | | | | | | | | | | | | | | | | | ATL; 26 | | | | | | 47th | 391 | |
| 1996 | Phoenix Racing | 44 | Chevy | DAY; 12 | CAR | RCH | ATL | DAR | BRI | NWS | MAR | TAL; 35 | SON | CLT | DOV | POC | MCH | DAY; 21 | NHA | POC | TAL; 40 | IND; DNQ | GLN | MCH | BRI | DAR | RCH | DOV | MAR | NWS | CLT | CAR | PHO | ATL | | | | | | 48th | 328 | |
| 1997 | LAR Motorsports | 12 | Chevy | DAY | CAR | RCH | ATL | DAR | TEX | BRI | MAR | SON | TAL | CLT | DOV | POC | MCH | CAL | DAY | NHA | POC | IND; 37 | GLN | MCH | BRI | DAR; 38 | RCH | NHA | DOV | MAR | CLT; 39 | TAL | CAR | PHO | ATL | | | | | 57th | 152 | |
| 2001 | Phoenix Racing | 51 | Ford | DAY; 43 | CAR | LVS | ATL | DAR | BRI | TEX | MAR | TAL; 34 | CAL | RCH | CLT | DOV | MCH | POC | SON | DAY; 42 | CHI | NHA | POC | IND | GLN | MCH | BRI | DAR | RCH | DOV | KAN | CLT | MAR | TAL; 42 | PHO | CAR | HOM | ATL | NHA | 54th | 169 | |

===== Daytona 500 =====
| Year | Team | Manufacturer | Start | Finish |
|---|---|---|---|---|
| 1991 | Phoenix Racing | Oldsmobile | 22 | 36 |
| 1993 | Phoenix Racing | Chevrolet | DNQ | |
| 1995 | Phoenix Racing | Chevrolet | 34 | 38 |
| 1996 | Phoenix Racing | Chevrolet | 34 | 12 |
| 2001 | Phoenix Racing | Ford | 17 | 43 |

==== Busch Series ====
NASCAR Busch Series results
| Year | Team | No. | Make | 1 | 2 | 3 | 4 | 5 | 6 | 7 | 8 | 9 | 10 | 11 | 12 | 13 | 14 | 15 | 16 | 17 | 18 | 19 | 20 | 21 | 22 | 23 | 24 | 25 | 26 | 27 | 28 | 29 | 30 | 31 | 32 | 33 | 34 | NBSC | Pts | Ref |
|---|---|---|---|---|---|---|---|---|---|---|---|---|---|---|---|---|---|---|---|---|---|---|---|---|---|---|---|---|---|---|---|---|---|---|---|---|---|---|---|---|
| 1989 | Phoenix Racing | 49 | Buick | DAY | CAR | MAR | HCY | DAR | BRI | NZH | SBO | LAN | NSV | CLT | DOV | ROU | LVL | VOL | MYB | SBO | HCY | DUB | IRP | ROU | BRI | DAR | RCH | DOV | MAR | CLT; 40 | CAR | MAR | | | | | | 96th | 43 | |
| 1990 | Phoenix Racing | 15 | Buick | DAY; 26 | RCH; 36 | CAR | MAR | HCY | DAR | BRI | LAN | SBO | NZH | HCY | | | | | | | | | | | | | | | | | | | | | | | | 74th | 170 | |
| 1990 | Phoenix Racing | 15 | Chevy | | | | | | | | | | | | CLT; 35 | DOV | ROU | VOL | MYB | OXF | NHA | SBO | DUB | IRP | ROU | | | | | | | | | | | | | 74th | 170 | |
| 1990 | Phoenix Racing | 15 | Olds | | | | | | | | | | | | | | | | | | | | | | | BRI; 26 | DAR | RCH | DOV | MAR | CLT | NHA | CAR | MAR | | | | 74th | 170 | |
| 1991 | Folsom Racing | 23 | Buick | DAY | RCH | CAR | MAR | VOL | HCY | DAR | BRI | LAN | SBO | NZH | CLT | DOV | ROU | HCY | MYB | GLN | OXF | NHA | SBO | DUB | IRP | ROU | BRI; 32 | DAR; 32 | RCH | | | | | | | | | 65th | 304 | |
| 1991 | | 14 | Buick | | | | | | | | | | | | | | | | | | | | | | | | | | | DOV; 35 | CLT; 17 | NHA | CAR | MAR | | | | 65th | 304 | |
| 1992 | Phoenix Racing | 51 | Chevy | DAY | CAR | RCH | ATL | MAR | DAR | BRI | HCY | LAN | DUB | NZH | CLT | DOV | ROU | MYB | GLN | VOL | NHA | TAL; 7 | IRP | ROU | | | | | | | | | | | | | | 51st | 476 | |
| 1992 | Allison Racing | 28 | Ford | | | | | | | | | | | | | | | | | | | | | | MCH; 12 | NHA | BRI | DAR; 21 | RCH; 20 | DOV | CLT | MAR | CAR | HCY | | | | 51st | 476 | |
| 1993 | Phoenix Racing | 51 | Chevy | DAY; DNQ | CAR | RCH | DAR | BRI | HCY | ROU | MAR | NZH | CLT | DOV | MYB | GLN | MLW | TAL | IRP | MCH | NHA | BRI | DAR | | | | | | | | | | | | | | | 74th | 164 | |
| 1993 | Reno Enterprises | 4 | Chevy | | | | | | | | | | | | | | | | | | | | | RCH; 34 | DOV | ROU | CLT | MAR | CAR | HCY | ATL; 20 | | | | | | | 74th | 164 | |
| 1994 | Phoenix Racing | 51 | Chevy | DAY | CAR | RCH | ATL; DNQ | MAR | DAR | HCY | BRI | ROU | NHA | NZH | CLT; 29 | DOV | MYB | GLN | MLW | SBO | **TAL**; 5 | HCY | IRP | MCH | BRI; 32 | DAR | RCH; 30 | DOV | CLT; DNQ | MAR | CAR | | | | | | | 58th | 371 | |
| 1995 | Phoenix Racing | 4 | Chevy | DAY; 9 | CAR | RCH | ATL; 12 | NSV; 35 | DAR | BRI | HCY | NHA | NZH | CLT; 9 | DOV | MYB | GLN; 36 | MLW | **TAL**; 31 | SBO | IRP | MCH; 12 | BRI; DNQ | DAR | RCH | DOV | CLT; 3 | CAR | HOM; 14 | | | | | | | | | 38th | 999 | |
| 1996 | Phoenix Racing | 4 | Chevy | **DAY**; 23 | CAR; 3 | **RCH**; 1 | ATL; 29 | NSV; 34 | DAR; 30 | BRI; 14 | HCY; 16 | NZH; 13 | CLT; 22 | DOV; 16 | SBO; 25 | MYB; 2 | GLN; 25 | MLW; 37 | NHA; 20 | TAL; 6 | IRP; 7 | MCH; 1 | BRI; 14 | DAR; 23 | RCH; 6 | DOV; 37 | CLT; 13 | CAR; 32 | HOM; 25 | | | | | | | | | 7th | 2894 | |
| 1997 | Phoenix Racing | 4 | Chevy | DAY; 9 | CAR; 33 | RCH; 34 | ATL; 36 | LVS | DAR | HCY | TEX | BRI | | | | | | | | | | | | | | | | | | | | | HOM; 38 | | | | | 44th | 972 | |
| 1997 | LAR Motorsports | 28 | Chevy | | | | | | | | | | NSV; 4 | TAL | NHA | NZH | CLT; 25 | DOV | SBO; 24 | GLN | MLW | MYB; 8 | GTY | IRP | MCH | BRI | DAR | RCH; 13 | DOV | CLT | CAL | CAR | | | | | | 44th | 972 | |
| 1998 | Phoenix Racing | 4 | Chevy | DAY; 2 | CAR; 20 | LVS; 28 | NSV; 18 | DAR; 32 | BRI; 27 | TEX; 36 | HCY | TAL; 15 | NHA; 4 | NZH; 2 | CLT; 31 | DOV; 22 | RCH; 12 | PPR; 5 | GLN; 32 | **MLW**; 3 | MYB; 29 | CAL; 6 | SBO; 28 | IRP | MCH | BRI | DAR | RCH; 6 | DOV; 7 | CLT; 9 | GTY; 3* | CAR; 19 | ATL; 35 | HOM; 12 | | | | 15th | 3019 | |
| 1999 | Diamond Ridge Motorsports | 4 | Chevy | DAY; 41 | CAR; 12 | LVS; 12 | ATL; 41 | DAR; 13 | TEX; 19 | NSV; 6 | BRI; 42 | TAL; 3 | CAL; 19 | NHA; 3 | RCH; 9 | NZH; 6 | CLT; 17 | DOV; 25 | SBO; 4 | GLN; 36 | MLW; 15 | MYB; 10 | PPR; 5 | GTY; 20 | IRP; 6 | MCH; 10 | BRI; 14 | DAR; 8 | RCH; 8 | DOV; 25 | CLT; 13 | CAR; 40 | MEM; 27 | PHO; 13 | HOM; 25 | | | 6th | 3658 | |
| 2000 | Joe Gibbs Racing | 4 | Pontiac | DAY; 29 | CAR; 43 | LVS; 7 | ATL; 30 | DAR; DNQ | BRI; 14 | TEX; 10 | NSV; 7 | TAL; 3 | CAL; 29 | RCH; 38 | NHA; 41 | CLT; DNQ | DOV; 12 | SBO; 17 | MYB; 42 | GLN | MLW; 2 | NZH; 6 | **PPR**; 13 | GTY; 2 | IRP; 2 | MCH; 12 | BRI; 7 | DAR; 23 | RCH; 31 | DOV; 19 | CLT; 27 | CAR; 38 | MEM; 10 | PHO; 10 | HOM; 11 | | | 11th | 3212 | |
| 2001 | Joe Gibbs Racing | 18 | Pontiac | DAY; 28* | CAR; 6 | LVS; 17 | ATL; 6 | DAR; 10 | BRI; 24 | TEX; 12 | NSH; 14 | TAL; 24 | CAL; 2 | RCH; 17 | NHA; 19 | NZH; 12 | CLT; 10 | DOV; 14 | KEN; 29 | MLW; 7 | GLN | CHI | | | | | | | | | | | | | | | | 21st | 2863 | |
| 2001 | Richard Childress Racing | 21 | Chevy | | | | | | | | | | | | | | | | | | | | GTY; 15 | PPR; 1* | IRP; 21 | MCH | BRI | DAR | RCH | DOV | KAN | CLT | | | | | | 21st | 2863 | |
| 2001 | ST Motorsports | 59 | Chevy | | | | | | | | | | | | | | | | | | | | | | | | | | | | | | MEM; 5 | PHO; 17 | CAR; 14 | HOM | | 21st | 2863 | |
| 2002 | Brewco Motorsports | 37 | Pontiac | DAY; 21 | | | | | | | TAL; 15 | | | | | | | | | | | | | | | | | | | | | | | | | | | 39th | 1309 | |
| 2002 | Brewco Motorsports | 37 | Chevy | | CAR; 18 | LVS; 23 | DAR; 30 | BRI; 27 | TEX; 1 | NSH; 13 | | CAL; 24 | RCH; 11 | NHA; 13 | NZH; 28 | CLT | DOV | NSH | KEN | MLW | DAY | CHI | GTY | PPR | IRP | MCH | BRI | DAR | RCH | DOV | KAN | CLT | MEM | ATL | CAR | PHO | HOM | 39th | 1309 | |
| 2004 | Phoenix Racing | 1 | Dodge | DAY | CAR | LVS | DAR | BRI | TEX | NSH | TAL | CAL | GTY | RCH | NZH; 17 | CLT | DOV | NSH | KEN | MLW | DAY | CHI | NHA | PPR | IRP | MCH | BRI | CAL | RCH | DOV | KAN | CLT | MEM | ATL | PHO | DAR | HOM | 113th | 112 | |

=== ARCA Bondo/Mar-Hyde Series ===
(key) (Bold – Pole position awarded by qualifying time. Italics – Pole position earned by points standings or practice time. * – Most laps led.)

ARCA Bondo/Mar-Hyde Series results
| Year | Team | No. | Make | 1 | 2 | 3 | 4 | 5 | 6 | 7 | 8 | 9 | 10 | 11 | 12 | 13 | 14 | 15 | 16 | 17 | 18 | 19 | 20 | 21 | 22 | 23 | 24 | 25 | ABSC | Pts | Ref |
|---|---|---|---|---|---|---|---|---|---|---|---|---|---|---|---|---|---|---|---|---|---|---|---|---|---|---|---|---|---|---|---|
| 1989 | Phoenix Racing | 05 | Buick | DAY | ATL | KIL | TAL | FRS | POC | KIL | HAG | POC | TAL; 36 | DEL | FRS | ISF | TOL | DSF | SLM | ATL | | | | | | | | | 121st | - | |
| 1990 | Phoenix Racing | 15 | Olds | DAY | ATL | KIL | TAL; 5 | FRS | POC | KIL | TOL | HAG | POC | | | | | | | | | | | | | | | | 81st | - | |
| 1990 | Phoenix Racing | 5 | Olds | | | | | | | | | | | TAL; 2 | MCH | ISF | TOL | DSF | WIN | DEL | ATL | | | | | | | | 81st | - | |
| 1991 | Folsom Racing | 11 | Buick | DAY | ATL | KIL | TAL | TOL | FRS | POC | MCH | KIL | FRS | DEL | POC | TAL | HPT | MCH | ISF | TOL | DSF | TWS; 28 | ATL | | | | | | 138th | - | |
| 1992 | Phoenix Racing | 5 | Olds | DAY; 32 | FIF | TWS | | | | | | | | | | | | | | | | | | | | | | | 70th | - | |
| 1992 | Phoenix Racing | 1 | Olds | | | | TAL; 3 | TOL | KIL | POC | MCH | FRS | KIL | NSH | DEL | POC | HPT | FRS | ISF | TOL | DSF | TWS | SLM | ATL; 4 | | | | | 70th | - | |
| 1993 | Phoenix Racing | 1 | Chevy | **DAY**; 1* | FIF | TWS; 25 | TAL; 9 | KIL | CMS | FRS | TOL | **POC**; 6 | MCH; 1 | FRS | **POC**; 2 | KIL | ISF | DSF | TOL | SLM | WIN | ATL; 1* | | | | | | | 18th | 1630 | |
| 1994 | Phoenix Racing | 1 | Chevy | DAY; 29* | **TAL**; 1* | FIF | LVL | KIL | TOL | FRS | MCH; 1* | DMS | POC; 2 | POC; 1* | KIL | FRS | INF | I70 | ISF | DSF | TOL | SLM | WIN | ATL; 34 | | | | | 23rd | 1455 | |
| 1995 | Phoenix Racing | 1 | Chevy | DAY; 40 | ATL | TAL; 3* | FIF | KIL | FRS | MCH; 1 | I80 | MCS | FRS | POC | POC | KIL | FRS | SBS | LVL | ISF | DSF | SLM | WIN | ATL | | | | | 69th | - | |
| 1996 | Phoenix Racing | 1 | Chevy | DAY; 1 | ATL | SLM | TAL | FIF | LVL | CLT | CLT | KIL | FRS | POC | MCH | FRS | TOL | POC | MCH | INF | SBS | ISF | DSF | KIL | SLM | WIN | CLT | ATL | 150th | - | |

== Awards ==
Purvis was inducted in the National Dirt Late Model Hall of Fame in the inaugural 2001 class.

Achievements
| Preceded by Tammy Jo Kirk | Snowball Derby Winner; 1995 | Succeeded by Rich Bickle |
