= Bobby Allison Motorsports =

Former NASCAR team

- Owner: Bobby Allison
- Series: NASCAR Cup Series, NASCAR Busch Series, NASCAR Craftsman Truck Series, ARCA Racing Series
- Manufacturer: Ford, Chevrolet, Dodge, Pontiac, Buick, AMC
- Opened: 1965
- Closed: 1996

Career
- Debut: Cup Series: 1965 Motor Trend 500 (Riverside); Busch Series: 1982 Mello Yello 300 (Charlotte); Truck Series: 1995 Fas Mart SuperTruck Shootout (Richmond); ARCA Series: 1980 Gould Prix 150 (Michigan)
- Latest race: Cup Series: 1996 Dura Lube 500 (Phoenix); Busch Series: 1988 All Pro 300 (Charlotte); Truck Series: 1995 Fas Mart SuperTruck Shootout (Richmond); ARCA Series: 1992 Mello Yello 350K (Topeka)
- Races competed: Total: 401; Cup Series: 347; Busch Series: 34; Truck Series: 1 ARCA Series: 19
- Drivers' Championships: Total: 0 Cup Series: 0 Busch Series: 0 Truck Series: 0 ARCA Re/Max Series: 0
- Race victories: Total: 7 Cup Series: 6 Busch Series: 1 Truck Series: 0 ARCA Series: 0
- Pole positions: Total: 14; Cup Series: 14; Busch Series: 0 Truck Series: 0 ARCA Series: 0

Bobby Allison Motorsports was an American professional stock car racing team owned by NASCAR Hall of Famer Bobby Allison that fielded entries in the NASCAR Cup Series, NASCAR Busch Series, NASCAR Truck Series and ARCA Racing Series on and off from 1965 to 1996.

== History ==
=== Cup Series ===
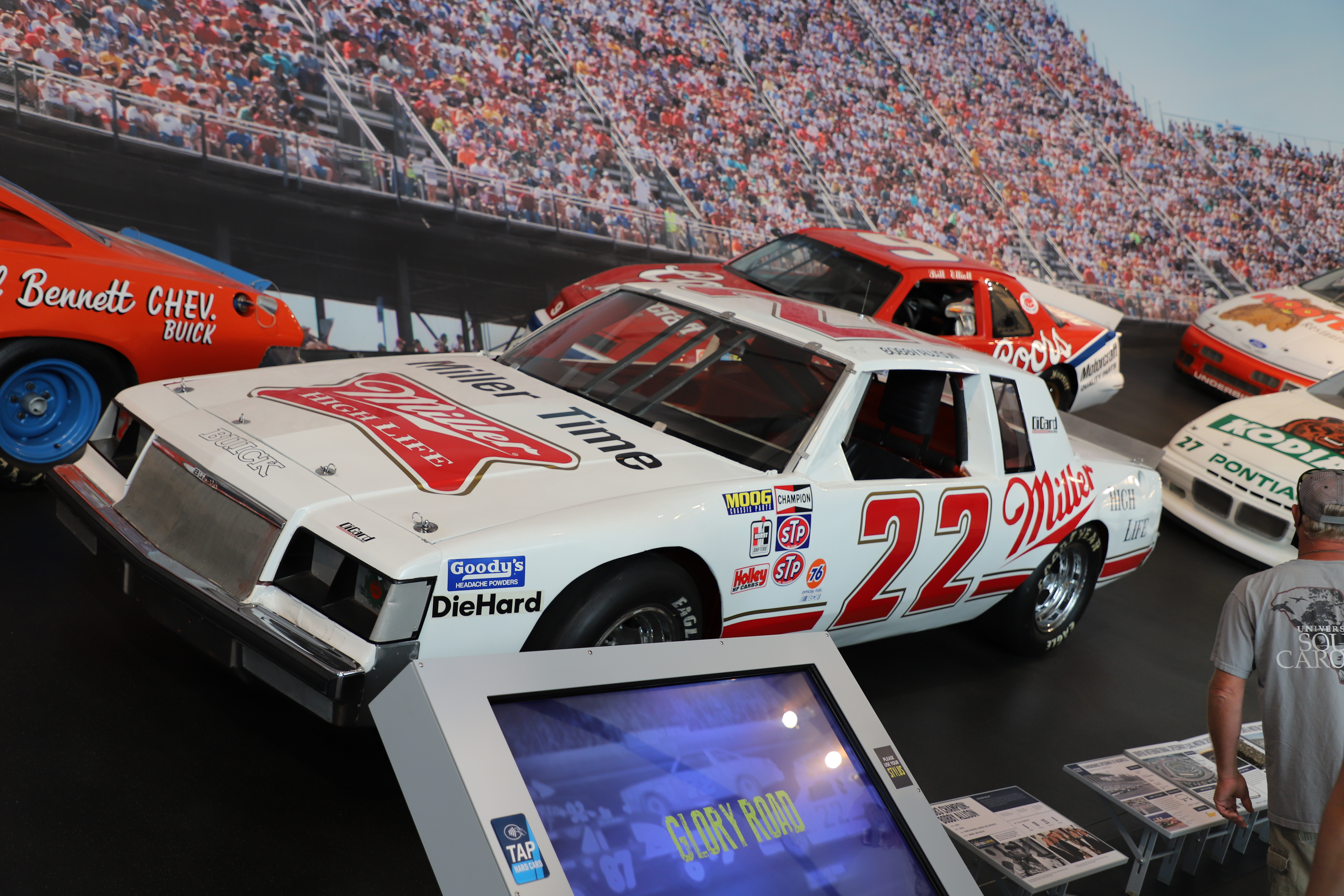

Allison drove his own cars for portions of the early 1970s, including the full 1973 season. Allison won six races as an owner-driver from 1970 to 1974. Allison also ran for his own team in 1977 after splitting with Penske Racing, with a best finish of second at Nashville. Other drivers who drove for Allison's team in its first stint in the Cup Series were Paul Lewis (1 race in 1968), G. C. Spencer (1 race in 1968), Dave Marcis (1 race in 1970) and Neil Bonnett (1 race in 1974 and 2 in 1975).

In 1985, Allison returned to being an owner-driver after leaving DiGard Motorsports, taking his number (22) and sponsor Miller Brewing Company with him to his own team. His best finish as an owner-driver in 1985 was a fourth-place finish at Dover. Following the 1985 season, he brought his number and sponsor with him to the Stavola Brothers Racing team.

After Allison retired from driving in 1988, he revived his team again in 1990 and was a car owner for numerous drivers, starting with Mike Alexander, Jeff Purvis and Hut Stricklin driving the team's No. 12 car that year. Stricklin, the son-in-law of Donnie Allison, continued to drive the car full-time in 1991 and for the entire 1992 season except for the last 8 races when he moved over to Junior Johnson & Associates. After Stricklin left the team in September 1992 for Junior Johnson & Associates, Purvis returned to drive for BAM as well as Jimmy Spencer, who continued with the team full-time into 1993. Raybestos, which was the primary sponsor of the car from 1990 to 1992, left for 1993 to sponsor the Stavola Brothers Racing No. 8 team, and Meineke Car Care Centers became the new primary sponsor.

Spencer also left for Junior Johnson's team in 1994 and was replaced by rookie Chuck Bown who moved up from the Busch Series. Bown suffered injuries from a crash at Pocono Raceway that year, which kept him out for the rest of the season. He was replaced by ARCA driver Tim Steele and later Derrike Cope. For the 1994 season, the team partnered with Ron Zook. Also from 1990 until the team's closure in 1996, Jimmy Fennig was the team's crew chief. Fennig had crew chiefed Bobby Allison to his 1988 Daytona 500 win with the Stavola Brothers and after his time at BAM, he crew chiefed for Roush Racing for the rest of his career, winning several races and a championship.

Cope drove full-time for BAM in the No. 12 car in 1995 and 1996 with primary sponsorship from Mane 'n Tail. Allison was forced to close down the team due to financial problems after the 1996 season, with Cope moving to the new MB2 Motorsports team for 1997.

== Team results, 1990–1996 ==
=== Car No. 12 results ===
Year	Driver	No.	Make	1	2	3	4	5	6	7	8	9	10	11	12	13	14	15	16	17	18	19	20	21	22	23	24	25	26	27	28	29	30	31	Owners	Pts	Ref
1990	Mike Alexander	12	Buick	DAY; 41	RCH; 14	CAR; 16	ATL; 23	DAR; 19	BRI; 23	NWS; 17																									23rd	2906	
1990	Jeff Purvis	12	Buick								MAR; 28																								23rd	2906	
1990	Hut Stricklin	12	Buick									TAL; 9	CLT; 37	DOV; 27	SON; 12	POC; 6	MCH; 32	DAY; 26	POC; 29	TAL; 14	GLN; 23	MCH; 15	BRI; 21	DAR; 20	RCH; 13	DOV; 11	MAR; 13	NWS; 20	CLT; 29	CAR; 34	PHO; 26	ATL; 13			23rd	2906	
1991	Hut Stricklin	12	Buick	DAY; 29	RCH; 22	CAR; 31	ATL; 13	DAR; 32	BRI; 16	NWS; 14	MAR; 10	TAL; 23	CLT; 6	DOV; 6	SON; 35	POC; 28	MCH; 2	DAY; 16	POC; 4	TAL; 29	GLN; 8	MCH; 14	BRI; 22	DAR; 17	RCH; 21	DOV; 4	MAR; 16	NWS; 17	CLT; 36	CAR; 13	PHO; 39	ATL; 13			17th	3199	
1992	Hut Stricklin	12	Chevy	DAY; 24	CAR; 9	RCH; 9	ATL; 29	DAR; 29	BRI; 8	NWS; 18	MAR; 11	TAL; 22	CLT; 34	DOV; 7	SON; 27	POC; 31	MCH; 35	DAY; 18	POC; 21	TAL; 16	GLN; 36		BRI; 27												22nd	3027	
1992	Hut Stricklin	12	Ford																			MCH; 24		DAR; 11											22nd	3027	
1992	Jeff Purvis	12	Chevy																						RCH; 22		MAR; 26	NWS; 32							22nd	3027	
1992	Jeff Purvis	12	Ford																							DOV; 32									22nd	3027	
1992	Jimmy Spencer	12	Ford																										CLT; 4	CAR; 11	PHO; 5	ATL; 4			22nd	3027	
1993	Jimmy Spencer	12	Ford	DAY; 13	CAR; 16	RCH; 13	ATL; 10	DAR; 29	BRI; 4	NWS; 14	MAR; 30	TAL; 2	SON; 27	CLT; 7	DOV; 8	POC; 4	MCH; 18	DAY; 39	NHA; 18	POC; 24	TAL; 30	GLN; 3	MCH; 20	BRI; 25	DAR; 15	RCH; 35	DOV; 6	MAR; 3	NWS; 13	CLT; 6	CAR; 20	PHO; 27	ATL; 16		12th	3496	
1994	Chuck Bown	12	Ford	DAY; 23	CAR; 25	RCH; 17	ATL; 41	DAR; 12	BRI; 23	NWS; 35	MAR; 7	TAL; 27	SON; 21	CLT; 13	DOV; 21	POC; 39																			30th	2638	
1994	Tim Steele	12	Ford														MCH; 39	DAY; 43	NHA; 41	POC; 33	TAL; 38	IND; DNQ													30th	2638	
1994	Derrike Cope	12	Ford																				GLN; 40	MCH; 18	BRI; 16	DAR; 35	RCH; 19	DOV; 12	MAR; 17	NWS; 19	CLT; 8	CAR; 37	PHO; 30	ATL; 7	30th	2638	
1995	Derrike Cope	12	Ford	DAY; 31	CAR; 8	RCH; 6	ATL; 13	DAR; 5	BRI; 13	NWS; 30	MAR; 28	TAL; 42	SON; 12	CLT; 19	DOV; 12	POC; 20	MCH; 19	DAY; 13	NHA; 7	POC; 39	TAL; 15	IND; 40	GLN; 15	MCH; 34	BRI; 10	DAR; 15	RCH; 34	DOV; 7	MAR; 9	NWS; 13	CLT; 11	CAR; 19	PHO; 2	ATL; 35	15th	3384	
1996	Derrike Cope	12	Ford	DAY; 41	CAR; 8	RCH; 22	ATL; 35	DAR; 39	BRI; 22	NWS; 13	MAR; 28	TAL; 29	SON; 39	CLT; 14	DOV; 23	POC; 27	MCH; 40	DAY; 42	NHA; 38	POC; 10	TAL; 27	IND; 14	GLN; 16	MCH; 24	BRI; 29	DAR; 34	RCH; 8	DOV; 31	MAR; DNQ	NWS; 37	CLT; 18	CAR; 39	PHO; 43	ATL; DNQ	34th	2374	

=== Busch, Truck and ARCA Series ===
The team made their ARCA debut in 1980 with Davey Allison, Ferrel Harris and John Rezek each running a race. Davey would run one race in 1982 and two in 1983 for his father's team in ARCA. Clifford Allison, Bobby's other son and Davey's brother, ran a combined total of 12 ARCA races for the family team between 1988 and 1992.

From 1982 to 1988, Allison fielded a Busch Series entry on a part-time basis. His son Davey drove four races in 1983, seven races in 1984 and four races in 1985, all in the team's No. 23 car. Bobby himself drove one race in 1982 in a No. 25 car and would next run a Busch race as an owner-driver in 1986, running the Nos. 7 and 85 in seven races combined. He ran five more races in 1987 with the No. 33 as his number. In 1988, the team switched numbers again to the No. 12, their Cup Series number. Allison started the season by scoring the team's only Busch Series win in the season-opener at Daytona, sweeping the weekend with a win in the Daytona 500 the next day. After running four more races in the car, Neil Bonnett drove it in the race at Charlotte in October, which ended up being BAM's final Busch Series race.

BAM fielded an entry in the Truck Series in one race in the inaugural season of the series in 1995. Derrike Cope, the team's Cup Series driver, drove a No. 32 truck in the race at Richmond and finished seventh.
