= 1991 Bud 500 =

20th race of the 1991 NASCAR Winston Cup Series

Race details
- Race 20 of 29 in the 1991 NASCAR Winston Cup Series
- The 1991 Bud 500 program cover, featuring Dale Earnhardt.
- Date: August 24, 1991
- Official name: 31st Annual Bud 500
- Location: Bristol, Tennessee, Bristol International Speedway
- Course: Permanent racing facility
- Course length: 0.533 miles (0.858 km)
- Distance: 500 laps, 266.5 mi (428.89 km)
- Scheduled distance: 500 laps, 266.5 mi (428.89 km)
- Average speed: 82.028 miles per hour (132.011 km/h)
- Attendance: 60,500

Pole position
Driver	Bill Elliott	Melling Racing
- Time: 16.406

Most laps led
Driver	Jimmy Spencer	Travis Carter Enterprises
- Laps: 206

Winner
No. 7	Alan Kulwicki	AK Racing

Television in the United States
- Network: ESPN
- Announcers: Bob Jenkins, Ned Jarrett, Benny Parsons

Radio in the United States
- Radio: Motor Racing Network

The 1991 Bud 500 was the 20th stock car race of the 1991 NASCAR Winston Cup Series and the 32nd iteration of the event. The race was held on Saturday, August 24, 1991, before an audience of 60,500 in Bristol, Tennessee, at Bristol Motor Speedway, a 0.533 miles (0.858 km) permanent oval-shaped racetrack. The race took the scheduled 500 laps to complete. At race's end, owner-driver Alan Kulwicki, after suffering a flat tire early into the race, would mount a comeback and dominate the late stages of the race to take his third career NASCAR Winston Cup Series victory and his only victory of the season. To fill out the top three, Junior Johnson & Associates driver Sterling Marlin and Hendrick Motorsports driver Ken Schrader would finish second and third, respectively.

== Background ==
The layout of Bristol International Speedway, the venue where the race was held.

The Bristol Motor Speedway, formerly known as Bristol International Raceway and Bristol Raceway, is a NASCAR short track venue located in Bristol, Tennessee. Constructed in 1960, it held its first NASCAR race on July 30, 1961. Despite its short length, Bristol is among the most popular tracks on the NASCAR schedule because of its distinct features, which include extraordinarily steep banking, an all concrete surface, two pit roads, and stadium-like seating. It has also been named one of the loudest NASCAR tracks.

=== Entry list ===
- (R) denotes rookie driver.

#	Driver	Team	Make
1	Rick Mast	Precision Products Racing	Oldsmobile
2	Rusty Wallace	Penske Racing South	Pontiac
3	Dale Earnhardt	Richard Childress Racing	Chevrolet
4	Ernie Irvan	Morgan–McClure Motorsports	Chevrolet
5	Ricky Rudd	Hendrick Motorsports	Chevrolet
6	Mark Martin	Roush Racing	Ford
7	Alan Kulwicki	AK Racing	Ford
8	Rick Wilson	Stavola Brothers Racing	Buick
9	Bill Elliott	Melling Racing	Ford
10	Derrike Cope	Whitcomb Racing	Chevrolet
11	Geoff Bodine	Junior Johnson & Associates	Ford
12	Hut Stricklin	Bobby Allison Motorsports	Buick
15	Morgan Shepherd	Bud Moore Engineering	Ford
17	Darrell Waltrip	Darrell Waltrip Motorsports	Chevrolet
19	Chad Little	Little Racing	Ford
21	Dale Jarrett	Wood Brothers Racing	Ford
22	Sterling Marlin	Junior Johnson & Associates	Ford
24	Dick Trickle	Team III Racing	Pontiac
25	Ken Schrader	Hendrick Motorsports	Chevrolet
26	Brett Bodine	King Racing	Buick
28	Davey Allison	Robert Yates Racing	Ford
30	Michael Waltrip	Bahari Racing	Pontiac
33	Harry Gant	Leo Jackson Motorsports	Oldsmobile
41	Larry Pearson	Larry Hedrick Motorsports	Chevrolet
42	Bobby Hillin Jr.	SABCO Racing	Pontiac
43	Richard Petty	Petty Enterprises	Pontiac
52	Jimmy Means	Jimmy Means Racing	Pontiac
55	Ted Musgrave (R)	U.S. Racing	Pontiac
66	Lake Speed	Cale Yarborough Motorsports	Pontiac
68	Bobby Hamilton (R)	TriStar Motorsports	Oldsmobile
71	Dave Marcis	Marcis Auto Racing	Chevrolet
75	Joe Ruttman	RahMoc Enterprises	Oldsmobile
94	Terry Labonte	Hagan Racing	Oldsmobile
98	Jimmy Spencer	Travis Carter Enterprises	Chevrolet

== Qualifying ==
Qualifying was split into two rounds. The first round was held on Friday, August 23, at 7:35 PM EST. Each driver would have one lap to set a time. During the first round, the top 15 drivers in the round would be guaranteed a starting spot in the race. If a driver was not able to guarantee a spot in the first round, they had the option to scrub their time from the first round and try and run a faster lap time in a second round qualifying run, held on Saturday, August 24, at 1:00 PM EST. As with the first round, each driver would have one lap to set a time. For this specific race, positions 15-30 would be decided on time, and depending on who needed it, a select amount of positions were given to cars who had not otherwise qualified on time but were high enough in owner's points; up to two provisionals were given. If needed, a past champion who did not qualify on either time or provisionals could use a champion's provisional, adding one more spot to the field.

Bill Elliott, driving for Melling Racing, won the pole, setting a time of 16.406 and an average speed of 116.957 mph (188.224 km/h) in the first round.

=== Full qualifying results ===
Pos.	#	Driver	Team	Make	Time	Speed
1	9	Bill Elliott	Melling Racing	Ford	16.406	116.957
2	2	Rusty Wallace	Penske Racing South	Pontiac	16.490	116.361
3	17	Darrell Waltrip	Darrell Waltrip Motorsports	Chevrolet	16.521	116.143
4	19	Chad Little	Little Racing	Ford	16.525	116.115
5	7	Alan Kulwicki	AK Racing	Ford	16.530	116.080
6	68	Bobby Hamilton (R)	TriStar Motorsports	Oldsmobile	16.580	115.730
7	28	Davey Allison	Robert Yates Racing	Ford	16.587	115.681
8	1	Rick Mast	Precision Products Racing	Oldsmobile	16.588	115.674
9	12	Hut Stricklin	Bobby Allison Motorsports	Buick	16.590	115.660
10	6	Mark Martin	Roush Racing	Ford	16.607	115.542
11	98	Jimmy Spencer	Travis Carter Enterprises	Chevrolet	16.612	115.507
12	8	Rick Wilson	Stavola Brothers Racing	Buick	16.614	115.493
13	3	Dale Earnhardt	Richard Childress Racing	Chevrolet	16.620	115.451
14	22	Sterling Marlin	Junior Johnson & Associates	Ford	16.622	115.437
15	42	Bobby Hillin Jr.	SABCO Racing	Pontiac	16.637	115.333
Failed to lock in Round 1
16	21	Dale Jarrett	Wood Brothers Racing	Ford	16.641	115.306
17	5	Ricky Rudd	Hendrick Motorsports	Chevrolet	16.644	115.285
18	15	Morgan Shepherd	Bud Moore Engineering	Ford	16.644	115.285
19	55	Ted Musgrave (R)	U.S. Racing	Pontiac	16.646	115.271
20	10	Derrike Cope	Whitcomb Racing	Chevrolet	16.656	115.202
21	24	Dick Trickle	Team III Racing	Pontiac	16.668	115.119
22	71	Dave Marcis	Marcis Auto Racing	Chevrolet	16.687	114.988
23	66	Lake Speed	Cale Yarborough Motorsports	Pontiac	16.705	114.864
24	75	Joe Ruttman	RahMoc Enterprises	Oldsmobile	16.709	114.836
25	33	Harry Gant	Leo Jackson Motorsports	Oldsmobile	16.721	114.754
26	4	Ernie Irvan	Morgan–McClure Motorsports	Chevrolet	16.748	114.569
27	25	Ken Schrader	Hendrick Motorsports	Chevrolet	16.771	114.412
28	94	Terry Labonte	Hagan Racing	Oldsmobile	16.834	113.984
29	11	Geoff Bodine	Junior Johnson & Associates	Ford	16.850	113.875
30	43	Richard Petty	Petty Enterprises	Pontiac	16.852	113.862
Provisionals
31	30	Michael Waltrip	Bahari Racing	Pontiac	-*	-*
32	26	Brett Bodine	King Racing	Buick	-*	-*
Failed to qualify
33	41	Larry Pearson	Larry Hedrick Motorsports	Chevrolet	-*	-*
34	52	Jimmy Means	Jimmy Means Racing	Pontiac	-*	-*
Official first round qualifying results
Official starting lineup

== Race results ==
Fin	St	#	Driver	Team	Make	Laps	Led	Status	Pts	Winnings
1	5	7	Alan Kulwicki	AK Racing	Ford	500	137	running	180	$61,400
2	14	22	Sterling Marlin	Junior Johnson & Associates	Ford	500	42	running	175	$30,275
3	27	25	Ken Schrader	Hendrick Motorsports	Chevrolet	500	0	running	165	$22,950
4	10	6	Mark Martin	Roush Racing	Ford	499	0	running	160	$19,700
5	17	5	Ricky Rudd	Hendrick Motorsports	Chevrolet	499	0	running	155	$16,450
6	18	15	Morgan Shepherd	Bud Moore Engineering	Ford	498	0	running	150	$13,125
7	13	3	Dale Earnhardt	Richard Childress Racing	Chevrolet	498	0	running	146	$16,025
8	3	17	Darrell Waltrip	Darrell Waltrip Motorsports	Chevrolet	498	41	running	147	$9,275
9	28	94	Terry Labonte	Hagan Racing	Oldsmobile	493	33	running	143	$9,225
10	32	26	Brett Bodine	King Racing	Buick	493	0	running	134	$11,875
11	23	66	Lake Speed	Cale Yarborough Motorsports	Pontiac	492	0	running	130	$8,425
12	30	43	Richard Petty	Petty Enterprises	Pontiac	491	0	running	127	$8,125
13	6	68	Bobby Hamilton (R)	TriStar Motorsports	Oldsmobile	490	0	running	124	$7,125
14	4	19	Chad Little	Little Racing	Ford	489	0	running	121	$5,025
15	11	98	Jimmy Spencer	Travis Carter Enterprises	Chevrolet	489	206	running	128	$20,375
16	19	55	Ted Musgrave (R)	U.S. Racing	Pontiac	488	0	running	115	$5,925
17	24	75	Joe Ruttman	RahMoc Enterprises	Oldsmobile	483	0	running	112	$6,975
18	26	4	Ernie Irvan	Morgan–McClure Motorsports	Chevrolet	449	0	running	109	$10,775
19	25	33	Harry Gant	Leo Jackson Motorsports	Oldsmobile	436	0	running	106	$6,865
20	12	8	Rick Wilson	Stavola Brothers Racing	Buick	409	0	suspension	103	$7,750
21	1	9	Bill Elliott	Melling Racing	Ford	404	0	running	100	$13,575
22	9	12	Hut Stricklin	Bobby Allison Motorsports	Buick	403	0	running	97	$6,450
23	22	71	Dave Marcis	Marcis Auto Racing	Chevrolet	400	0	running	94	$6,375
24	7	28	Davey Allison	Robert Yates Racing	Ford	377	11	engine	96	$11,550
25	31	30	Michael Waltrip	Bahari Racing	Pontiac	350	14	running	93	$6,205
26	8	1	Rick Mast	Precision Products Racing	Oldsmobile	344	0	crash	85	$5,575
27	21	24	Dick Trickle	Team III Racing	Pontiac	313	0	ignition	82	$4,050
28	16	21	Dale Jarrett	Wood Brothers Racing	Ford	253	0	crash	79	$5,500
29	20	10	Derrike Cope	Whitcomb Racing	Chevrolet	239	0	engine	76	$11,075
30	15	42	Bobby Hillin Jr.	SABCO Racing	Pontiac	220	0	running	73	$9,625
31	29	11	Geoff Bodine	Junior Johnson & Associates	Ford	183	0	crash	70	$11,425
32	2	2	Rusty Wallace	Penske Racing South	Pontiac	88	16	crash	72	$4,425
Official race results

== Standings after the race ==
Drivers' Championship standings

	Pos	Driver	Points
	1	Dale Earnhardt	2,995
	2	Ricky Rudd	2,935 (-60)
2	3	Mark Martin	2,820 (-175)
1	4	Davey Allison	2,808 (–187)
1	5	Ernie Irvan	2,804 (–191)
	6	Ken Schrader	2,661 (–334)
	7	Darrell Waltrip	2,623 (–372)
1	8	Sterling Marlin	2,585 (–410)
1	9	Rusty Wallace	2,523 (–472)
	10	Harry Gant	2,471 (–524)
Official driver's standings

- Note: Only the first 10 positions are included for the driver standings.

Previous race: 1991 Champion Spark Plug 400	NASCAR Winston Cup Series; 1991 season	Next race: 1991 Heinz Southern 500
