= 1991 Tyson Holly Farms 400 =

25th race of the 1991 NASCAR Winston Cup Series

Race details
- Race 25 of 29 in the 1991 NASCAR Winston Cup Series
- The 1991 Tyson Holly Farms 400 program cover, featuring Chad Little. Artwork by NASCAR artist Sam Bass.
- Date: September 29, 1991
- Official name: 42nd Annual Tyson Holly Farms 400
- Location: North Wilkesboro Speedway, North Wilkesboro, North Carolina
- Course: Permanent racing facility
- Course length: 0.625 miles (1.006 km)
- Distance: 400 laps, 250 mi (402.336 km)
- Scheduled distance: 400 laps, 250 mi (402.336 km)
- Average speed: 94.113 miles per hour (151.460 km/h)
- Attendance: 43,500

Pole position
Driver	Harry Gant	Leo Jackson Motorsports
- Time: 19.252

Most laps led
Driver	Harry Gant	Leo Jackson Motorsports
- Laps: 350

Winner
No. 3	Dale Earnhardt	Richard Childress Racing

Television in the United States
- Network: ESPN
- Announcers: Bob Jenkins, Ned Jarrett, Benny Parsons

Radio in the United States
- Radio: Motor Racing Network

The 1991 Tyson Holly Farms 400 was the 25th stock car race of the 1991 NASCAR Winston Cup Series and the 42nd iteration of the event. The race was held on Sunday, September 29, 1991, before an audience of 43,500 in North Wilkesboro, North Carolina at the North Wilkesboro Speedway, a 0.625 miles (1.006 km) oval short track. The race took the scheduled 400 laps to complete. In the final laps of the race, taking advantage of a brake failure of the dominant driver of the day, Leo Jackson Motorsports driver Harry Gant, Richard Childress Racing driver Dale Earnhardt would mount a late-race charge to the lead, passing Gant with nine laps to go in the race to take the victory, breaking Gant's streak of four consecutive victories. The victory was Earnhardt's 52nd career NASCAR Winston Cup Series victory and his fourth and final victory of the season. To fill out the top three, the aforementioned Harry Gant and Bud Moore Engineering driver Morgan Shepherd would finish second and third, respectively.

== Background ==
The layout of North Wilkesboro Speedway, the venue where the race was held.

North Wilkesboro Speedway is a short oval racetrack located on U.S. Route 421, about five miles east of the town of North Wilkesboro, North Carolina, or 80 miles north of Charlotte. It measures 0.625 mi (1.006 km) and features a unique uphill backstretch and downhill frontstretch. It has previously held races in NASCAR's top three series, including 93 Winston Cup Series races. The track, a NASCAR original, operated from 1949, NASCAR's inception, until the track's original closure in 1996. The speedway briefly reopened in 2010 and hosted several stock car series races before closing again in the spring of 2011. It was re-opened in August 2022 for grassroots racing.

=== Entry list ===
- (R) denotes rookie driver.

#	Driver	Team	Make
1	Rick Mast	Precision Products Racing	Oldsmobile
2	Rusty Wallace	Penske Racing South	Pontiac
3	Dale Earnhardt	Richard Childress Racing	Chevrolet
4	Ernie Irvan	Morgan–McClure Motorsports	Chevrolet
5	Ricky Rudd	Hendrick Motorsports	Chevrolet
6	Mark Martin	Roush Racing	Ford
7	Alan Kulwicki	AK Racing	Ford
8	Rick Wilson	Stavola Brothers Racing	Buick
9	Bill Elliott	Melling Racing	Ford
10	Derrike Cope	Whitcomb Racing	Chevrolet
11	Geoff Bodine	Junior Johnson & Associates	Ford
12	Hut Stricklin	Bobby Allison Motorsports	Buick
15	Morgan Shepherd	Bud Moore Engineering	Ford
17	Darrell Waltrip	Darrell Waltrip Motorsports	Chevrolet
19	Chad Little	Little Racing	Ford
21	Dale Jarrett	Wood Brothers Racing	Ford
22	Sterling Marlin	Junior Johnson & Associates	Ford
24	Jimmy Hensley	Team III Racing	Pontiac
25	Ken Schrader	Hendrick Motorsports	Chevrolet
26	Brett Bodine	King Racing	Buick
28	Davey Allison	Robert Yates Racing	Ford
30	Michael Waltrip	Bahari Racing	Pontiac
33	Harry Gant	Leo Jackson Motorsports	Oldsmobile
42	Kyle Petty	SABCO Racing	Pontiac
43	Richard Petty	Petty Enterprises	Pontiac
52	Jimmy Means	Jimmy Means Racing	Pontiac
55	Ted Musgrave (R)	U.S. Racing	Pontiac
66	Chuck Bown	Cale Yarborough Motorsports	Pontiac
68	Bobby Hamilton (R)	TriStar Motorsports	Oldsmobile
71	Dave Marcis	Marcis Auto Racing	Chevrolet
75	Joe Ruttman	RahMoc Enterprises	Oldsmobile
94	Terry Labonte	Hagan Racing	Oldsmobile
98	Jimmy Spencer	Travis Carter Enterprises	Chevrolet

== Qualifying ==
Qualifying was split into two rounds. The first round was held on Friday, September 27, at 3:00 PM EST. Each driver would have one lap to set a time. During the first round, the top 15 drivers in the round would be guaranteed a starting spot in the race. If a driver was not able to guarantee a spot in the first round, they had the option to scrub their time from the first round and try and run a faster lap time in a second round qualifying run, held on Saturday, September 28, at 12:00 PM EST. As with the first round, each driver would have one lap to set a time. For this specific race, positions 16-30 would be decided on time, and depending on who needed it, a select amount of positions were given to cars who had not otherwise qualified but were high enough in owner's points; up to two were given. If needed, a past champion who did not qualify on either time or provisionals could use a champion's provisional, adding one more spot to the field.

Harry Gant, driving for Leo Jackson Motorsports, won the pole, setting a time of 19.252 and an average speed of 116.871 mph (188.086 km/h) in the first round.

No drivers would fail to qualify.

=== Full qualifying results ===
Pos.	#	Driver	Team	Make	Time	Speed
1	33	Harry Gant	Leo Jackson Motorsports	Oldsmobile	19.252	116.871
2	28	Davey Allison	Robert Yates Racing	Ford	19.256	116.846
3	6	Mark Martin	Roush Racing	Ford	19.264	116.798
4	7	Alan Kulwicki	AK Racing	Ford	19.316	116.484
5	21	Dale Jarrett	Wood Brothers Racing	Ford	19.348	116.291
6	4	Ernie Irvan	Morgan–McClure Motorsports	Chevrolet	19.358	116.231
7	2	Rusty Wallace	Penske Racing South	Pontiac	19.366	116.183
8	9	Bill Elliott	Melling Racing	Ford	19.370	116.159
9	15	Morgan Shepherd	Bud Moore Engineering	Ford	19.395	116.009
10	25	Ken Schrader	Hendrick Motorsports	Chevrolet	19.398	115.991
11	26	Brett Bodine	King Racing	Buick	19.415	115.890
12	98	Jimmy Spencer	Travis Carter Enterprises	Chevrolet	19.426	115.824
13	68	Bobby Hamilton (R)	TriStar Motorsports	Oldsmobile	19.432	115.788
14	11	Geoff Bodine	Junior Johnson & Associates	Ford	19.450	115.681
15	17	Darrell Waltrip	Darrell Waltrip Motorsports	Chevrolet	19.457	115.640
Failed to lock in Round 1
16	3	Dale Earnhardt	Richard Childress Racing	Chevrolet	19.421	115.854
17	12	Hut Stricklin	Bobby Allison Motorsports	Buick	19.454	115.657
18	1	Rick Mast	Precision Products Racing	Oldsmobile	19.462	115.610
19	94	Terry Labonte	Hagan Racing	Oldsmobile	19.462	115.610
20	22	Sterling Marlin	Junior Johnson & Associates	Ford	19.474	115.539
21	42	Kyle Petty	SABCO Racing	Pontiac	19.493	115.426
22	5	Ricky Rudd	Hendrick Motorsports	Chevrolet	19.503	115.367
23	10	Derrike Cope	Whitcomb Racing	Chevrolet	19.512	115.314
24	71	Dave Marcis	Marcis Auto Racing	Chevrolet	19.524	115.243
25	19	Chad Little	Little Racing	Ford	19.525	115.237
26	75	Joe Ruttman	RahMoc Enterprises	Chevrolet	19.541	115.143
27	24	Jimmy Hensley	Team III Racing	Pontiac	19.544	115.125
28	30	Michael Waltrip	Bahari Racing	Pontiac	19.596	114.819
29	8	Rick Wilson	Stavola Brothers Racing	Buick	19.632	114.609
30	55	Ted Musgrave (R)	U.S. Racing	Pontiac	19.663	114.428
Provisionals
31	66	Chuck Bown	Cale Yarborough Motorsports	Pontiac	20.046	112.242
32	52	Jimmy Means	Jimmy Means Racing	Oldsmobile	19.692	114.260
Champion’s Provisional
33	43	Richard Petty	Petty Enterprises	Pontiac	19.876	113.202
Official first round qualifying results
Official starting lineup

== Race results ==
Fin	St	#	Driver	Team	Make	Laps	Led	Status	Pts	Winnings
1	16	3	Dale Earnhardt	Richard Childress Racing	Chevrolet	400	9	running	180	$69,350
2	1	33	Harry Gant	Leo Jackson Motorsports	Oldsmobile	400	350	running	180	$40,575
3	9	15	Morgan Shepherd	Bud Moore Engineering	Ford	400	41	running	170	$25,375
4	2	28	Davey Allison	Robert Yates Racing	Ford	400	0	running	160	$19,600
5	3	6	Mark Martin	Roush Racing	Ford	400	0	running	155	$18,875
6	7	2	Rusty Wallace	Penske Racing South	Pontiac	400	0	running	150	$8,950
7	11	26	Brett Bodine	King Racing	Buick	400	0	running	146	$9,280
8	10	25	Ken Schrader	Hendrick Motorsports	Chevrolet	400	0	running	142	$8,425
9	5	21	Dale Jarrett	Wood Brothers Racing	Ford	400	0	running	138	$7,975
10	4	7	Alan Kulwicki	AK Racing	Ford	400	0	running	134	$13,355
11	27	24	Jimmy Hensley	Team III Racing	Pontiac	399	0	running	130	$5,975
12	22	5	Ricky Rudd	Hendrick Motorsports	Chevrolet	399	0	running	127	$9,950
13	20	22	Sterling Marlin	Junior Johnson & Associates	Ford	398	0	running	124	$5,500
14	19	94	Terry Labonte	Hagan Racing	Oldsmobile	398	0	running	121	$6,750
15	14	11	Geoff Bodine	Junior Johnson & Associates	Ford	398	0	running	118	$12,050
16	21	42	Kyle Petty	SABCO Racing	Pontiac	397	0	running	115	$9,550
17	17	12	Hut Stricklin	Bobby Allison Motorsports	Buick	397	0	running	112	$6,475
18	13	68	Bobby Hamilton (R)	TriStar Motorsports	Oldsmobile	397	0	running	109	$5,375
19	33	43	Richard Petty	Petty Enterprises	Pontiac	396	0	running	106	$5,875
20	15	17	Darrell Waltrip	Darrell Waltrip Motorsports	Chevrolet	395	0	running	103	$5,350
21	25	19	Chad Little	Little Racing	Ford	394	0	running	100	$3,450
22	30	55	Ted Musgrave (R)	U.S. Racing	Pontiac	394	0	running	97	$4,375
23	12	98	Jimmy Spencer	Travis Carter Enterprises	Chevrolet	393	0	running	94	$5,425
24	8	9	Bill Elliott	Melling Racing	Ford	392	0	running	91	$9,925
25	18	1	Rick Mast	Precision Products Racing	Oldsmobile	391	0	running	88	$5,400
26	31	66	Chuck Bown	Cale Yarborough Motorsports	Pontiac	391	0	running	85	$5,225
27	28	30	Michael Waltrip	Bahari Racing	Pontiac	391	0	running	82	$4,550
28	32	52	Jimmy Means	Jimmy Means Racing	Oldsmobile	390	0	running	79	$2,985
29	26	75	Joe Ruttman	RahMoc Enterprises	Chevrolet	353	0	running	76	$4,450
30	23	10	Derrike Cope	Whitcomb Racing	Chevrolet	320	0	running	73	$10,075
31	24	71	Dave Marcis	Marcis Auto Racing	Chevrolet	315	0	rear end	70	$4,400
32	29	8	Rick Wilson	Stavola Brothers Racing	Buick	240	0	accident	67	$4,425
33	6	4	Ernie Irvan	Morgan–McClure Motorsports	Chevrolet	164	0	accident	64	$9,225
Official race results

== Standings after the race ==
Drivers' Championship standings

	Pos	Driver	Points
	1	Dale Earnhardt	3,750
	2	Ricky Rudd	3,638 (-112)
	3	Ernie Irvan	3,452 (-298)
	4	Davey Allison	3,431 (–319)
1	5	Harry Gant	3,386 (–364)
1	6	Mark Martin	3,380 (–370)
	7	Ken Schrader	3,317 (–433)
	8	Sterling Marlin	3,226 (–524)
	9	Darrell Waltrip	3,192 (–558)
	10	Rusty Wallace	3,154 (–596)
Official driver's standings

- Note: Only the first 10 positions are included for the driver standings.

Previous race: 1991 Goody's 500	NASCAR Winston Cup Series; 1991 season	Next race: 1991 Mello Yello 500
