= 1991 Goody's 500 =

24th race of the 1991 NASCAR Winston Cup Series

Race details
- Race 24 of 29 in the 1991 NASCAR Winston Cup Series
- The 1991 Goody's 500 program cover, featuring Geoff Bodine.
- Date: September 22, 1991
- Official name: 43rd Annual Goody's 500
- Location: Ridgeway, Virginia, Martinsville Speedway
- Course: Permanent racing facility
- Course length: 0.526 miles (0.847 km)
- Distance: 500 laps, 263 mi (423.257 km)
- Scheduled distance: 500 laps, 263 mi (423.257 km)
- Average speed: 74.535 miles per hour (119.952 km/h)
- Attendance: 46,000

Pole position
Driver	Mark Martin	Roush Racing
- Time: 20.324

Most laps led
Driver	Harry Gant	Leo Jackson Motorsports
- Laps: 226

Winner
No. 33	Harry Gant	Leo Jackson Motorsports

Television in the United States
- Network: ESPN
- Announcers: Bob Jenkins, Ned Jarrett, Benny Parsons

Radio in the United States
- Radio: Motor Racing Network

The 1991 Goody's 500 was the 24th stock car race of the 1991 NASCAR Winston Cup Series season and the 43rd iteration of the event. The race was held on Sunday, September 22, 1991, in Martinsville, Virginia at Martinsville Speedway, a 0.526 miles (0.847 km) permanent oval-shaped short track. The race took the scheduled 500 laps to complete. In the final laps of the race, Leo Jackson Motorsports driver Harry Gant would mount a late-race charge to the lead after being spun on lap 376 of the race. After passing for the lead on lap 454, Gant was able to defend the field for the final laps of the race to take his 16th career NASCAR Winston Cup Series victory, his fifth and final victory of the season, and his fourth straight victory. To fill out the top three, King Racing driver Brett Bodine and Richard Childress Racing driver Dale Earnhardt would finish second and third, respectively.

With the victory, Gant, having won four out of the five races that occurred within the month of September of 1991, Gant would earn the nickname "Mr. September" by NASCAR media.

== Background ==
The layout of Martinsville Speedway, the venue where the race was held.

Martinsville Speedway is a NASCAR-owned stock car racing track located in Henry County, in Ridgeway, Virginia, just to the south of Martinsville. At 0.526 miles (0.847 km) in length, it is the shortest track in the NASCAR Cup Series. The track was also one of the first paved oval tracks in NASCAR, being built in 1947 by H. Clay Earles. It is also the only remaining race track that has been on the NASCAR circuit from its beginning in 1948.

=== Entry list ===
- (R) denotes rookie driver.

#	Driver	Team	Make
1	Rick Mast	Precision Products Racing	Oldsmobile
2	Rusty Wallace	Penske Racing South	Pontiac
3	Dale Earnhardt	Richard Childress Racing	Chevrolet
4	Ernie Irvan	Morgan–McClure Motorsports	Chevrolet
5	Ricky Rudd	Hendrick Motorsports	Chevrolet
6	Mark Martin	Roush Racing	Ford
7	Alan Kulwicki	AK Racing	Ford
8	Rick Wilson	Stavola Brothers Racing	Buick
9	Bill Elliott	Melling Racing	Ford
10	Derrike Cope	Whitcomb Racing	Chevrolet
11	Geoff Bodine	Junior Johnson & Associates	Ford
12	Hut Stricklin	Bobby Allison Motorsports	Buick
15	Morgan Shepherd	Bud Moore Engineering	Ford
17	Darrell Waltrip	Darrell Waltrip Motorsports	Chevrolet
19	Chad Little	Little Racing	Ford
21	Dale Jarrett	Wood Brothers Racing	Ford
22	Sterling Marlin	Junior Johnson & Associates	Ford
24	Jimmy Hensley	Team III Racing	Pontiac
25	Ken Schrader	Hendrick Motorsports	Chevrolet
26	Brett Bodine	King Racing	Buick
28	Davey Allison	Robert Yates Racing	Ford
30	Michael Waltrip	Bahari Racing	Pontiac
33	Harry Gant	Leo Jackson Motorsports	Oldsmobile
42	Kyle Petty	SABCO Racing	Pontiac
43	Richard Petty	Petty Enterprises	Pontiac
52	Jimmy Means	Jimmy Means Racing	Pontiac
55	Ted Musgrave (R)	U.S. Racing	Pontiac
66	Lake Speed	Cale Yarborough Motorsports	Pontiac
68	Bobby Hamilton (R)	TriStar Motorsports	Oldsmobile
71	Dave Marcis	Marcis Auto Racing	Chevrolet
75	Joe Ruttman	RahMoc Enterprises	Oldsmobile
94	Terry Labonte	Hagan Racing	Oldsmobile
98	Jimmy Spencer	Travis Carter Enterprises	Chevrolet

== Qualifying ==
Qualifying was split into two rounds. The first round was held on Friday, September 20, at 3:00 p.m. EST. Each driver would have one lap to set a time. During the first round, the top 20 drivers in the round would be guaranteed a starting spot in the race. If a driver was not able to guarantee a spot in the first round, they had the option to scrub their time from the first round and try and run a faster lap time in a second round qualifying run, held on Saturday, September 21, at 12:30 p.m. EST. As with the first round, each driver would have one lap to set a time. For this specific race, positions 21-30 would be decided on time, and depending on who needed it, a select amount of positions were given to cars who had not otherwise qualified but were high enough in owner's points; up to two provisionals were given. If needed, a past champion who did not qualify on either time or provisionals could use a champion's provisional, adding one more spot to the field.

Mark Martin, driving for Roush Racing, won the pole, setting a time of 20.324 and an average speed of 93.171 mph (149.944 km/h) in the first round.

Jimmy Means was the only driver to fail to qualify.

=== Full qualifying results ===
Pos.	#	Driver	Team	Make	Time	Speed
1	6	Mark Martin	Roush Racing	Ford	20.324	93.171
2	26	Brett Bodine	King Racing	Buick	20.329	93.148
3	17	Darrell Waltrip	Darrell Waltrip Motorsports	Chevrolet	20.389	92.874
4	5	Ricky Rudd	Hendrick Motorsports	Chevrolet	20.393	92.855
5	3	Dale Earnhardt	Richard Childress Racing	Chevrolet	20.394	92.851
6	7	Alan Kulwicki	AK Racing	Ford	20.411	92.774
7	2	Rusty Wallace	Penske Racing South	Pontiac	20.430	92.687
8	42	Kyle Petty	SABCO Racing	Pontiac	20.431	92.683
9	25	Ken Schrader	Hendrick Motorsports	Chevrolet	20.491	92.411
10	15	Morgan Shepherd	Bud Moore Engineering	Ford	20.519	92.285
11	68	Bobby Hamilton (R)	TriStar Motorsports	Oldsmobile	20.525	92.258
12	33	Harry Gant	Leo Jackson Motorsports	Oldsmobile	20.547	92.159
13	4	Ernie Irvan	Morgan–McClure Motorsports	Chevrolet	20.551	92.142
14	12	Hut Stricklin	Bobby Allison Motorsports	Buick	20.555	92.124
15	9	Bill Elliott	Melling Racing	Ford	20.572	92.047
16	1	Rick Mast	Precision Products Racing	Oldsmobile	20.594	91.949
17	30	Michael Waltrip	Bahari Racing	Pontiac	20.608	91.887
18	24	Jimmy Hensley	Team III Racing	Pontiac	20.608	91.887
19	11	Geoff Bodine	Junior Johnson & Associates	Ford	20.621	91.829
20	21	Dale Jarrett	Wood Brothers Racing	Ford	20.653	91.686
Failed to lock in Round 1
21	98	Jimmy Spencer	Travis Carter Enterprises	Chevrolet	20.536	92.209
22	8	Rick Wilson	Stavola Brothers Racing	Buick	20.644	91.726
23	10	Derrike Cope	Whitcomb Racing	Chevrolet	20.644	91.726
24	19	Chad Little	Little Racing	Ford	20.673	91.598
25	28	Davey Allison	Robert Yates Racing	Ford	20.674	91.593
26	94	Terry Labonte	Hagan Racing	Oldsmobile	20.678	91.576
27	66	Lake Speed	Cale Yarborough Motorsports	Pontiac	20.694	91.505
28	71	Dave Marcis	Marcis Auto Racing	Chevrolet	20.738	91.311
29	43	Richard Petty	Petty Enterprises	Pontiac	20.779	91.130
30	75	Joe Ruttman	RahMoc Enterprises	Oldsmobile	20.855	90.798
Provisionals
31	22	Sterling Marlin	Junior Johnson & Associates	Ford	-*	-*
32	55	Ted Musgrave (R)	U.S. Racing	Pontiac	-*	-*
Failed to qualify
33	52	Jimmy Means	Jimmy Means Racing	Pontiac	-*	-*
Official first round qualifying results
Official starting lineup

== Race results ==
Fin	St	#	Driver	Team	Make	Laps	Led	Status	Pts	Winnings
1	12	33	Harry Gant	Leo Jackson Motorsports	Oldsmobile	500	226	running	185	$64,000
2	2	26	Brett Bodine	King Racing	Buick	500	59	running	175	$36,625
3	5	3	Dale Earnhardt	Richard Childress Racing	Chevrolet	500	9	running	170	$30,350
4	13	4	Ernie Irvan	Morgan–McClure Motorsports	Chevrolet	500	62	running	165	$19,300
5	1	6	Mark Martin	Roush Racing	Ford	500	13	running	160	$24,575
6	26	94	Terry Labonte	Hagan Racing	Oldsmobile	500	0	running	150	$12,900
7	7	2	Rusty Wallace	Penske Racing South	Pontiac	500	64	running	151	$11,500
8	4	5	Ricky Rudd	Hendrick Motorsports	Chevrolet	500	2	running	147	$15,300
9	9	25	Ken Schrader	Hendrick Motorsports	Chevrolet	500	0	running	138	$10,700
10	18	24	Jimmy Hensley	Team III Racing	Pontiac	500	0	running	134	$11,300
11	10	15	Morgan Shepherd	Bud Moore Engineering	Ford	499	0	running	130	$12,135
12	8	42	Kyle Petty	SABCO Racing	Pontiac	499	0	running	127	$11,150
13	16	1	Rick Mast	Precision Products Racing	Oldsmobile	499	0	running	124	$8,150
14	31	22	Sterling Marlin	Junior Johnson & Associates	Ford	499	0	running	121	$6,450
15	3	17	Darrell Waltrip	Darrell Waltrip Motorsports	Chevrolet	497	0	running	118	$7,900
16	14	12	Hut Stricklin	Bobby Allison Motorsports	Buick	497	1	running	120	$7,450
17	11	68	Bobby Hamilton (R)	TriStar Motorsports	Oldsmobile	497	0	running	112	$6,950
18	20	21	Dale Jarrett	Wood Brothers Racing	Ford	496	0	running	109	$6,755
19	23	10	Derrike Cope	Whitcomb Racing	Chevrolet	495	0	running	106	$12,250
20	32	55	Ted Musgrave (R)	U.S. Racing	Pontiac	495	0	running	103	$6,025
21	28	71	Dave Marcis	Marcis Auto Racing	Chevrolet	492	1	running	105	$6,125
22	6	7	Alan Kulwicki	AK Racing	Ford	485	19	running	102	$9,550
23	19	11	Geoff Bodine	Junior Johnson & Associates	Ford	484	0	running	94	$11,050
24	24	19	Chad Little	Little Racing	Ford	480	8	running	96	$3,500
25	17	30	Michael Waltrip	Bahari Racing	Pontiac	458	0	running	88	$5,650
26	22	8	Rick Wilson	Stavola Brothers Racing	Buick	447	0	running	85	$5,400
27	15	9	Bill Elliott	Melling Racing	Ford	437	0	running	82	$9,950
28	21	98	Jimmy Spencer	Travis Carter Enterprises	Chevrolet	429	36	running	84	$5,150
29	25	28	Davey Allison	Robert Yates Racing	Ford	402	0	running	76	$10,350
30	29	43	Richard Petty	Petty Enterprises	Pontiac	348	0	crash	73	$4,500
31	30	75	Joe Ruttman	RahMoc Enterprises	Oldsmobile	271	0	crash	70	$4,500
32	27	66	Lake Speed	Cale Yarborough Motorsports	Pontiac	239	0	brakes	67	$4,500
Official race results

== Standings after the race ==
Drivers' Championship standings

	Pos	Driver	Points
	1	Dale Earnhardt	3,570
	2	Ricky Rudd	3,511 (-59)
	3	Ernie Irvan	3,388 (-182)
	4	Davey Allison	3,271 (–299)
	5	Mark Martin	3,225 (–345)
1	6	Harry Gant	3,206 (–364)
1	7	Ken Schrader	3,175 (–395)
	8	Sterling Marlin	3,102 (–468)
	9	Darrell Waltrip	3,089 (–481)
	10	Rusty Wallace	3,004 (–566)
Official driver's standings

- Note: Only the first 10 positions are included for the driver standings.

Previous race: 1991 Peak Antifreeze 500	NASCAR Winston Cup Series; 1991 season	Next race: 1991 Tyson Holly Farms 400
