= 1991 NASCAR Winston Cup Series =

American motorsport season

Seasons
- ← 1990 1992 →

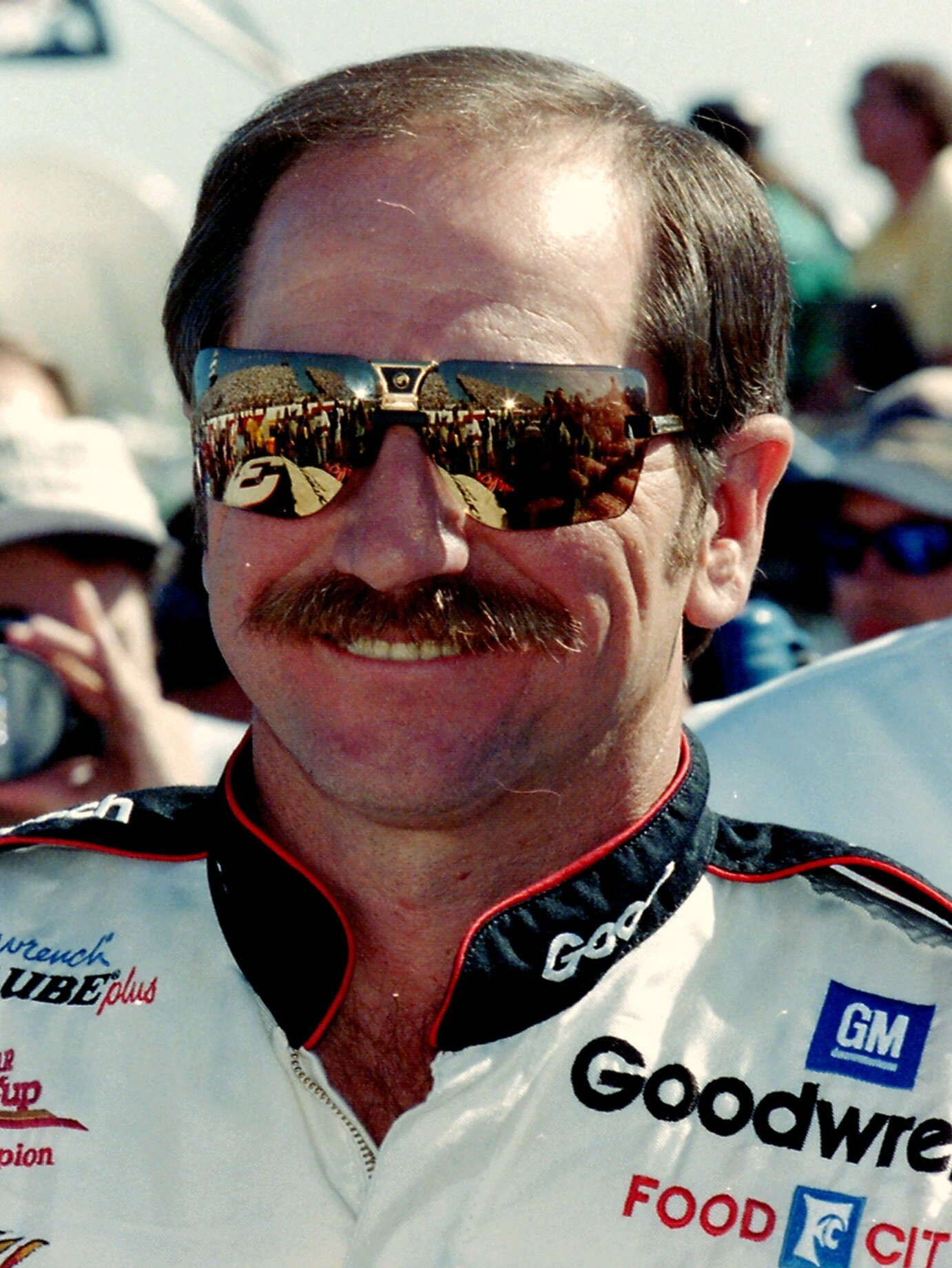
Dale Earnhardt won his 5th of seven titles.

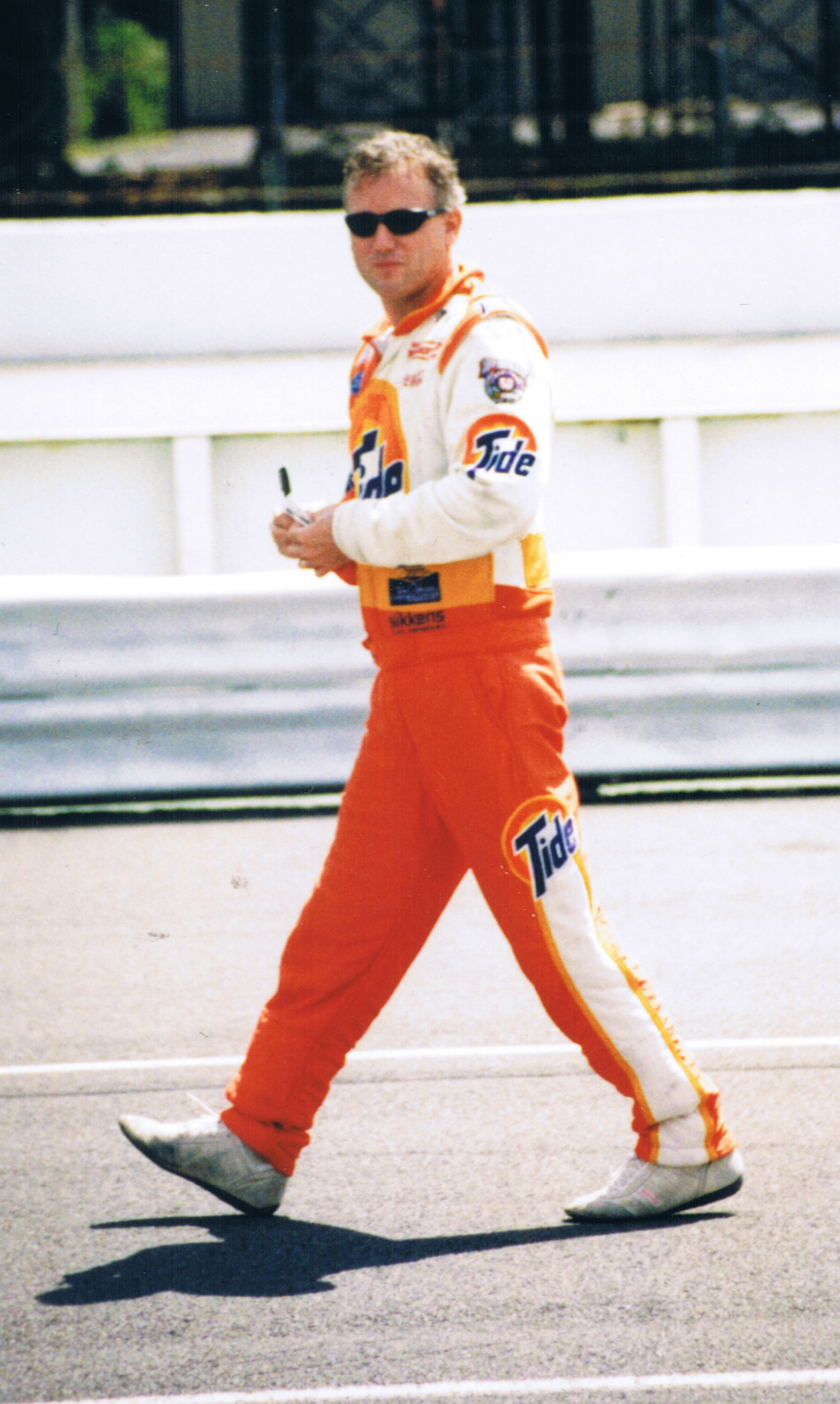
Ricky Rudd finished second in points.

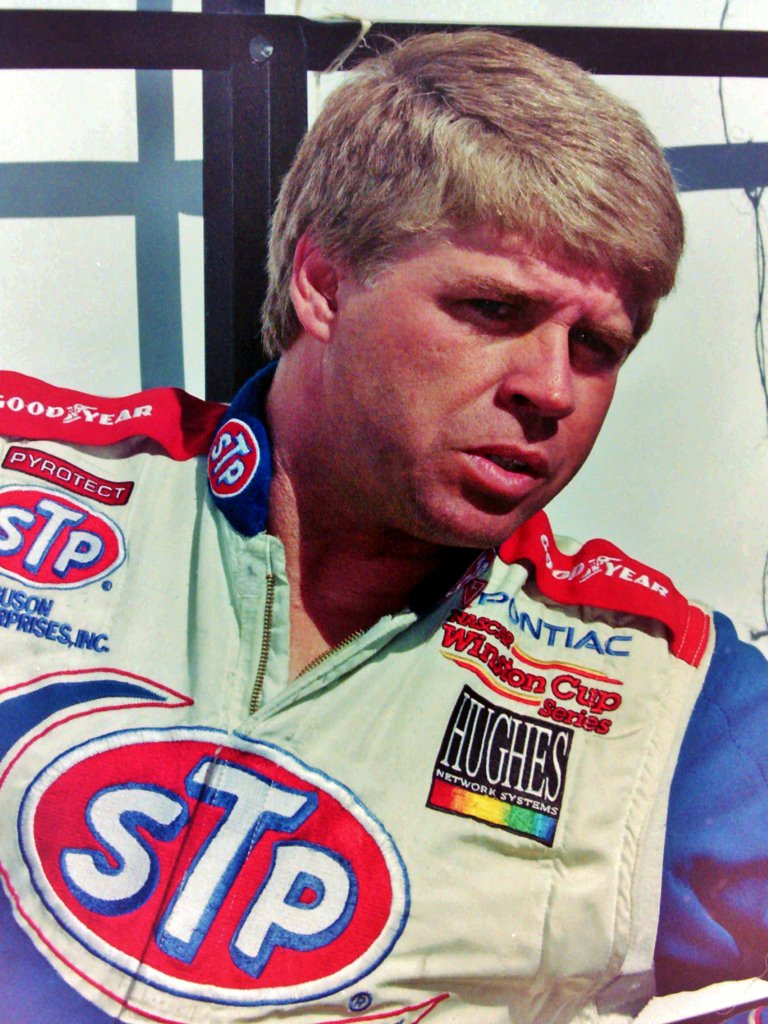
Bobby Hamilton, the 1991 Winston Cup Rookie of the Year.

The 1991 NASCAR Winston Cup Series was the 43rd of professional stock car racing in the United States and the 20th modern-era Cup Season. It began February 10 and ended November 17. Dale Earnhardt of Richard Childress Racing won his fifth Winston Cup championship at the conclusion of the season. The season was marred by the death of driver and team owner J. D. McDuffie, who was killed in a wreck at Watkins Glen.

A bevy of new Pit rules were introduced at Daytona to start out the 1991 season, in response to the death of a Melling Racing rear tire changer in a pit road accident at Atlanta the previous November. The new rules changed the complexity of the races, and over the course of the season, they would be tweaked and revised. By mid-season, most of the more complicated rules were scrapped, but a few were made permanent. The pit road speed limit (at all times) and use of the "lollipop" style signboard were the significant changes made permanent (and remain to this day).

The 1991 season introduced the past champion's provisional (also known as the "Petty rule"), which allowed a former Cup Series champion to claim the final starting position in a race if he failed to qualify on speed, and if he was too low in the points standings to secure an ordinary provisional spot. If there were two or more former champions that failed to qualify, the Champion's Provisional would be awarded to the most recent champion. This rule was implemented after Richard Petty failed to qualify for four races in 1989, resulting in a drop in ratings that season.

The 1991 season was also the final year for Buick as a full-time manufacturer in the series; Buick cars would run only limited schedules in 1992 and 1993 before leaving the series for good.

The Nashville Network debuted as a cable television partner with the Cup Series in 1991. For 1991, there were five television networks broadcasting the 29-race Winston Cup Series schedule: CBS, ABC, ESPN, TBS, and TNN.

== 1991 NASCAR Winston Cup Series Drivers ==
=== Full-time teams ===
Manufacturer	Team	No.	Driver	Crew chief
Buick	Bobby Allison Motorsports	12	Hut Stricklin	Jimmy Fennig
Buick	King Racing	26	Brett Bodine	
Buick	Stavola Brothers Racing	8	Rick Wilson	Harry Hyde
Chevrolet	Darrell Waltrip Motorsports	17	Darrell Waltrip	Jeff Hammond
Chevrolet	Hendrick Motorsports	5	Ricky Rudd	Waddell Wilson
Chevrolet	Hendrick Motorsports	25	Ken Schrader	Richard Broome
Chevrolet	Marcis Auto Racing	71	Dave Marcis	Bob Marcis
Chevrolet	Morgan-McClure Motorsports	4	Ernie Irvan	Tony Glover
Chevrolet	Richard Childress Racing	3	Dale Earnhardt	Kirk Shelmerdine
Chevrolet	Travis Carter Enterprises	98	Jimmy Spencer	Travis Carter
Chevrolet	Bob Whitcomb Racing	10	Derrike Cope	Buddy Parrott
Ford	AK Racing	7	Alan Kulwicki	Paul Andrews
Ford	Bud Moore Engineering	15	Morgan Shepherd	Donnie Wingo
Ford	Junior Johnson & Associates	11	Geoff Bodine 25	Tim Brewer
Ford	Junior Johnson & Associates	11	Tommy Ellis 4	Tim Brewer
Ford	Junior Johnson & Associates	22	Sterling Marlin	Mike Beam
Ford	Little Racing	19	Chad Little	Harry Hyde
Ford	Melling Racing	9	Bill Elliott	Ernie Elliott
Ford	Robert Yates Racing	28	Davey Allison	Larry McReynolds
Ford	Roush Racing	6	Mark Martin	Robin Pemberton
Ford	U.S. Racing	55	Ted Musgrave (R)	
Ford	Wood Brothers Racing	21	Dale Jarrett	Eddie Wood
Oldsmobile	Hagan Racing	94	Terry Labonte	Steve Lloyd
Oldsmobile	Leo Jackson Motorsports	33	Harry Gant	Andy Petree
Oldsmobile	Precision Products Racing	1	Rick Mast	
Pontiac	Bahari Racing	30	Michael Waltrip	Bill Ingle
Pontiac	Cale Yarborough Motorsports	66	Dick Trickle 4	
Pontiac	Cale Yarborough Motorsports	66	Lake Speed 20	
Pontiac	Cale Yarborough Motorsports	66	Chuck Bown 1	
Pontiac	Cale Yarborough Motorsports	66	Dorsey Schroeder 1	
Pontiac	Cale Yarborough Motorsports	66	Randy LaJoie 3	
Pontiac	Penske Racing	2	Rusty Wallace	Jimmy Makar
Pontiac	Petty Enterprises	43	Richard Petty	Robbie Loomis
Pontiac	SABCO Racing	42	Kyle Petty 18	Gary Nelson
Pontiac	SABCO Racing	42	Kenny Wallace 2	Gary Nelson
Pontiac	SABCO Racing	42	Tommy Kendall 1	Gary Nelson
Pontiac	SABCO Racing	42	Bobby Hillin Jr. 7	Gary Nelson
Pontiac	Team III Racing	24	Mickey Gibbs 15	Barry Dodson
Pontiac	Team III Racing	24	Dick Trickle 6	Barry Dodson
Pontiac	Team III Racing	24	Dorsey Schroeder 1	Barry Dodson
Pontiac	Team III Racing	24	Kenny Wallace 3	Barry Dodson
Pontiac	Team III Racing	24	Jimmy Hensley 4	Barry Dodson
Oldsmobile 25 Chevrolet 4	RahMoc Enterprises	75	Joe Ruttman	Bob Rahilly
Oldsmobile 28 Pontiac 1	Tri-Star Motorsports	68	Bobby Hamilton (R)	
Pontiac 28 Oldsmobile 1	Means Racing	52	Jimmy Means 25	
Pontiac 28 Oldsmobile 1	Means Racing	52	Bobby Hillin Jr. 2	
Pontiac 28 Oldsmobile 1	Means Racing	52	Mike Wallace 2	

=== Part-time teams ===
Manufacturer	Team	No.	Driver	Crew chief	Rounds
Buick	AAG Racing	34	Gary Balough		1
Buick	AAG Racing	34	Dick Trickle		4
Buick	Hylton Motorsports	48	James Hylton		1
Buick	Labonte Motorsports	44	Jack Sellers		2
Buick	Linro Motorsports	13	Brian Ross		1
Buick	Linro Motorsports	13	Kerry Teague		1
Buick	Linro Motorsports	13	Randy LaJoie		1
Buick	Linro Motorsports	13	Gary Balough		1
Buick	Linro Motorsports	13	Oma Kimbrough		1
Buick	Linro Motorsports	29	Kerry Teague		1
Buick	BS&S Motorsports	49	Stanley Smith (R)		11
Chevrolet	BS&S Motorsports	49	Stanley Smith (R)		1
Chevrolet	A. J. Foyt Enterprises	14	Mike Chase		1
Chevrolet	Bahre Racing	65	Dave Mader III		2
Chevrolet	Mader Racing	65	Dave Mader III		3
Chevrolet	Ball Motorsports	99	Brad Teague		3
Chevrolet	Buck Baker Racing	87	Randy Baker		3
Chevrolet	Daytona Speed, Inc.	18	Greg Sacks		1
Chevrolet	Faggart Racing	76	Robbie Faggart		1
Chevrolet	Hylton Motorsports	48	James Hylton		1
Chevrolet	Italian Connection	96	Phil Parsons		1
Chevrolet	Larry Hedrick Motorsports	41	Larry Pearson		14
Chevrolet	O'Neil Racing	63	Norm Benning		1
Chevrolet	Phoenix Racing	51	Jeff Purvis		2
Chevrolet	Pinnacle Racing	86	Jeff Green		1
Chevrolet	Ross Racing	58	Brian Ross		1
Chevrolet	Sadler Brothers Racing	95	Rick Jeffrey		1
Chevrolet	Sadler Brothers Racing	95	Kerry Teague		1
Chevrolet	Sadler Brothers Racing	95	Eddie Bierschwale		2
Chevrolet	Spears Motorsports	76	Bill Sedgwick		4
Chevrolet	Team Ireland	53	John Paul Jr.		3
Chevrolet	Team Ireland	53	Bobby Hillin Jr.		3
Chevrolet	S&H Racing	80	Jimmy Horton		1
Ford	S&H Racing	80	Jimmy Horton		5
Ford	Compton Racing	69	Dorsey Schroeder		1
Ford	Donlavey Racing	90	Robby Gordon	Junie Donlavey	2
Ford	Donlavey Racing	90	Wally Dallenbach Jr. (R)	Junie Donlavey	11
Ford	Donlavey Racing	90	Steve Perry	Junie Donlavey	1
Ford	Freymiller Racing	23	Mike Chase		1
Ford	Ragan Racing	77	Ken Ragan		1
Ford	Stahl Racing	82	Mark Stahl		10
Ford	Waters Racing	0	Delma Cowart		5
Oldsmobile	Barkdoll Racing	73	Phil Barkdoll		4
Oldsmobile	Bierschwale Motorsports	23	Eddie Bierschwale		5
Oldsmobile	Close Racing	47	Rich Bickle		6
Oldsmobile	Close Racing	47	Greg Sacks		13
Oldsmobile	A. J. Foyt Enterprises	14	Mike Chase		3
Oldsmobile	Labonte Motorsports	14	Bobby Labonte		1
Oldsmobile	Labonte Motorsports	44	Bobby Labonte		2
Oldsmobile	Labonte Motorsports	44	Irv Hoerr		4
Oldsmobile	Moroso Racing	20	Sammy Swindell		1
Oldsmobile	Moroso Racing	20	Bobby Hillin Jr.		9
Oldsmobile	Moroso Racing	20	Kim Campbell		2
Oldsmobile	Moroso Racing	20	Buddy Baker		6
Oldsmobile	Moroso Racing	20	Ricky Craven		1
Oldsmobile	Moroso Racing	27	Bobby Hillin Jr.		1
Oldsmobile	Moroso Racing	88	Buddy Baker		1
Oldsmobile	Phoenix Racing	51	Jeff Purvis		9
Oldsmobile	Sadler Brothers Racing	95	Kerry Teague		1
Pontiac	Bahre Racing	65	Dave Mader III		3
Pontiac	Hill Motorsports	56	Jerry Hill		2
Pontiac	Mansion Motorsports	27	Gary Balough		1
Pontiac	Mark Gibson Racing	59	Mark Gibson		3
Pontiac	McDuffie Racing	70	J. D. McDuffie		15
Pontiac	Mueller Brothers Racing	89	Jim Sauter		10
Pontiac	Osterlund Motorsports	88	Buddy Baker		1

== Schedule ==
No.	Race title	Track	Date
	Busch Clash	Daytona International Speedway, Daytona Beach	February 10
	Gatorade Twin 125 Qualifiers	Daytona International Speedway, Daytona Beach	February 14
1	Daytona 500	Daytona International Speedway, Daytona Beach	February 17
2	Pontiac Excitement 400	Richmond International Raceway, Richmond	February 24
3	Goodwrench 500	North Carolina Motor Speedway, Rockingham	March 3
4	Motorcraft 500	Atlanta Motor Speedway, Hampton	March 17–18
5	TranSouth 500	Darlington Raceway, Darlington	April 7
6	Valleydale Meats 500	Bristol International Raceway, Bristol	April 14
7	First Union 400	North Wilkesboro Speedway, North Wilkesboro	April 21
8	Hanes 500	Martinsville Speedway, Ridgeway	April 28
9	Winston 500	Talladega Superspeedway, Talladega	May 6
	Winston Open	Charlotte Motor Speedway, Concord	May 19
	The Winston	Charlotte Motor Speedway, Concord	May 19
10	Coca-Cola 600	Charlotte Motor Speedway, Concord	May 26
11	Budweiser 500	Dover Downs International Speedway, Dover	June 3
12	Banquet Frozen Foods 300	Sears Point Raceway, Sonoma	June 9
13	Champion Spark Plug 500	Pocono International Raceway, Long Pond	June 16
14	Miller Genuine Draft 400	Michigan International Speedway, Brooklyn	June 23
15	Pepsi 400	Daytona International Speedway, Daytona Beach	July 6
16	Miller Genuine Draft 500	Pocono International Raceway, Long Pond	July 21
17	DieHard 500	Talladega Superspeedway, Talladega	July 28
18	Budweiser at The Glen	Watkins Glen International, Watkins Glen	August 11
19	Champion Spark Plug 400	Michigan International Speedway, Brooklyn	August 18
20	Bud 500	Bristol International Raceway, Bristol	August 24
21	Heinz Southern 500	Darlington Raceway, Darlington	September 1
22	Miller Genuine Draft 400	Richmond International Raceway, Richmond	September 7
23	Peak Antifreeze 500	Dover Downs International Speedway, Dover	September 15
24	Goody's 500	Martinsville Speedway, Ridgeway	September 22
25	Tyson/Holly Farms 400	North Wilkesboro Speedway, North Wilkesboro	September 29
26	Mello Yello 500	Charlotte Motor Speedway, Concord	October 6
27	AC Delco 500	North Carolina Motor Speedway, Rockingham	October 20
28	Pyroil 500K	Phoenix International Raceway, Phoenix	November 3
29	Hardee's 500	Atlanta Motor Speedway, Hampton	November 17

== Races ==
No.	Race	Pole position	Most laps led	Winning driver	Manufacturer
	Busch Clash	Derrike Cope	Dale Earnhardt	Dale Earnhardt	Chevrolet
	Gatorade Twin 125 #1	Davey Allison	Davey Allison	Davey Allison	Ford
	Gatorade Twin 125 #2	Ernie Irvan	Dale Earnhardt	Dale Earnhardt	Chevrolet
1	Daytona 500	Davey Allison	Kyle Petty	Ernie Irvan	Chevrolet
2	Pontiac Excitement 400	Davey Allison	Ricky Rudd	Dale Earnhardt	Chevrolet
3	GM Goodwrench 500	Kyle Petty	Kyle Petty	Kyle Petty	Pontiac
4	Motorcraft 500	Alan Kulwicki	Bill Elliott	Ken Schrader	Chevrolet
5	TranSouth 500	Geoff Bodine	Michael Waltrip	Ricky Rudd	Chevrolet
6	Valleydale Meats 500	Rusty Wallace	Ricky Rudd	Rusty Wallace	Pontiac
7	First Union 400	Brett Bodine	Brett Bodine	Darrell Waltrip	Chevrolet
8	Hanes 500	Mark Martin	Dale Earnhardt	Dale Earnhardt	Chevrolet
9	Winston 500	Ernie Irvan	Dale Earnhardt	Harry Gant	Oldsmobile
	Winston Open	Michael Waltrip	Michael Waltrip	Michael Waltrip	Pontiac
	The Winston	Davey Allison	Davey Allison	Davey Allison	Ford
10	Coca-Cola 600	Mark Martin	Davey Allison	Davey Allison	Ford
11	Budweiser 500	Michael Waltrip	Dale Earnhardt	Ken Schrader	Chevrolet
12	Banquet Frozen Foods 300	Ricky Rudd	Rusty Wallace	Davey Allison	Ford
13	Champion Spark Plug 500	Mark Martin	Ernie Irvan	Darrell Waltrip	Chevrolet
14	Miller Genuine Draft 400	Michael Waltrip	Davey Allison	Davey Allison	Ford
15	Pepsi 400	Sterling Marlin	Ernie Irvan	Bill Elliott	Ford
16	Miller Genuine Draft 500	Alan Kulwicki	Ernie Irvan	Rusty Wallace	Pontiac
17	DieHard 500	Sterling Marlin	Dale Earnhardt	Dale Earnhardt	Chevrolet
18	Budweiser at The Glen	Terry Labonte	Ernie Irvan	Ernie Irvan	Chevrolet
19	Champion Spark Plug 400	Alan Kulwicki	Davey Allison	Dale Jarrett	Ford
20	Bud 500	Bill Elliott	Jimmy Spencer	Alan Kulwicki	Ford
21	Heinz Southern 500	Davey Allison	Harry Gant	Harry Gant	Oldsmobile
22	Miller Genuine Draft 400	Rusty Wallace	Davey Allison	Harry Gant	Oldsmobile
23	Peak AntiFreeze 500	Alan Kulwicki	Harry Gant	Harry Gant	Oldsmobile
24	Goody's 500	Mark Martin	Harry Gant	Harry Gant	Oldsmobile
25	Tyson Holly Farms 400	Harry Gant	Harry Gant	Dale Earnhardt	Chevrolet
26	Mello Yello 500	Mark Martin	Mark Martin	Geoff Bodine	Ford
27	AC Delco 500	Kyle Petty	Harry Gant	Davey Allison	Ford
28	Pyroil 500	Geoff Bodine	Davey Allison	Davey Allison	Ford
29	Hardee's 500	Bill Elliott	Mark Martin	Mark Martin	Ford

=== Busch Clash ===
The Busch Clash, an invitational event for all Busch Pole winners the previous year, was held February 10 at Daytona International Speedway. The starting lineup was decided by random draw. Derrike Cope drew the pole.

Top-ten results:

1. #3 - Dale Earnhardt
2. #6 - Mark Martin
3. #9 - Bill Elliott
4. #4 - Ernie Irvan
5. #2 - Rusty Wallace
6. #25 - Ken Schrader
7. #42 - Kyle Petty
8. #5 - Ricky Rudd
9. #11 - Geoff Bodine
10. #26 - Brett Bodine
- After several years of mediocre competition, the race's format was slightly re-tooled. Instead of a single 20-lap sprint, the race was divided into two 10-lap segments. After the first 10-lap half, the caution was displayed (caution laps did not count), freezing the field. The field was inverted for the second 10-lap half. Prize money was awarded for finishing positions in both halves, encouraging drivers to race hard during the first segment, and not hold back or "sandbag" in order to start up front for the second half.

=== Gatorade 125s ===
The Gatorade 125s, qualifying races for the Daytona 500 were held February 14 at Daytona International Speedway. Davey Allison and Ernie Irvan won the pole for each race, respectively.

Top-ten results (Race One):

1. #28 - Davey Allison
2. #43 - Richard Petty
3. #12 - Hut Stricklin
4. #1 - Rick Mast
5. #5 - Ricky Rudd
6. #33 - Harry Gant
7. #30 - Michael Waltrip
8. #9 - Bill Elliott
9. #21 - Dale Jarrett
10. #11 - Geoff Bodine

Top-ten results (Race Two):

1. #3 - Dale Earnhardt
2. #4 - Ernie Irvan
3. #42 - Kyle Petty
4. #2 - Rusty Wallace
5. #17 - Darrell Waltrip
6. #22 - Sterling Marlin
7. #75 - Joe Ruttman
8. #88 - Buddy Baker
9. #6 - Mark Martin
10. #68 - Bobby Hamilton

=== Daytona 500 by STP ===
The Daytona 500 by STP was held on February 17 at Daytona International Speedway. Davey Allison won the pole.

Top-ten results:

1. #4 - Ernie Irvan
2. #22 - Sterling Marlin
3. #75 - Joe Ruttman
4. #1 - Rick Mast
5. #3 - Dale Earnhardt
6. #21 - Dale Jarrett −1 lap
7. #27 - Bobby Hillin Jr. −1 lap
8. #7 - Alan Kulwicki −1 lap
9. #5 - Ricky Rudd −1 lap
10. #68 - Bobby Hamilton −1 lap
- In response to the death of Melling Racing rear tire changer Mike Ritch in a pit road accident at Atlanta the previous November, A bevy of new Pit rules were introduced at Daytona to start out the 1991 season. The new rules changed the complexity of the race, and would be tweaked and revised over the next several races.

=== Pontiac Excitement 400 ===
The Pontiac Excitement 400 was held February 24 at Richmond International Raceway. Davey Allison won the pole.

Top-ten results:

1. #3 - Dale Earnhardt*
2. #5 - Ricky Rudd
3. #33 - Harry Gant
4. #2 - Rusty Wallace
5. #7 - Alan Kulwicki
6. #6 - Mark Martin
7. #17 - Darrell Waltrip
8. #15 - Morgan Shepherd −1 lap
9. #22 - Sterling Marlin −2 laps
10. #25 - Ken Schrader −2 laps

Failed to qualify: #70 - J. D. McDuffie

- Earnhardt left Richmond with a 340–318 point lead over Rudd. The two drivers would remain 1–2 in the championship all season long, trading the points lead multiple times.

=== Goodwrench 500 ===
The Goodwrench 500 was held March 3 at North Carolina Motor Speedway. Kyle Petty won the pole.

Top-ten results:

1. #42 - Kyle Petty
2. #25 - Ken Schrader
3. #33 - Harry Gant −1 lap
4. #5 - Ricky Rudd −1 lap
5. #9 - Bill Elliott −1 lap
6. #4 - Ernie Irvan −2 laps
7. #30 - Michael Waltrip −2 laps
8. #3 - Dale Earnhardt −3 laps
9. #17 - Darrell Waltrip −4 laps
10. #15 - Morgan Shepherd −4 laps

Failed to qualify: #64 - Gary Wright, #70 - J. D. McDuffie, #82 - Mark Stahl

- This was the first live flag to flag Winston Cup Series race televised on TNN. Both races at Rockingham, along with Dover, and the series penultimate race at Phoenix, switched from ESPN to TNN starting in 1991. This was after ESPN moved some races to tape delay at the last minute in 1990.

=== Motorcraft 500 ===
The Motorcraft 500 started on March 18 but heavy rain forced the finish of the race to be postponed to March 19, the race was run at Atlanta Motor Speedway. Alan Kulwicki won the pole.

Top-ten results:

1. #25 - Ken Schrader
2. #9 - Bill Elliott
3. #3 - –Dale Earnhardt
4. #15 - Morgan Shepherd
5. #30 - Michael Waltrip
6. #5 - Ricky Rudd
7. #22 - Sterling Marlin
8. #7 - Alan Kulwicki* −1 lap
9. #17 - Darrell Waltrip −1 lap
10. #2 - Rusty Wallace −1 lap

Failed to qualify: #49 - Stanley Smith, #82 - Mark Stahl*

- This was the last NASCAR race in this series not to be televised. It has been slated to air on ABC but was a two-day race because of rain early in the race. The majority of the race was not televised on TV (Motor Racing Network was able to cover the entirety of the race on the radio) and results were only available on local news.
- It was this race where Alan Kulwicki first gained his iconic Hooters sponsorship. Hooters was initially Mark Stahl's sponsor, but after Stahl failed to qualify for Hooter's home race, Hooters moved their sponsorship to Kulwicki's unsponsored machine.

=== TranSouth 500 ===
The TranSouth 500 was held April 7 at Darlington Raceway. Geoff Bodine won the pole.

Top-ten results:

1. #5 - Ricky Rudd
2. #28 - Davey Allison
3. #30 - Michael Waltrip
4. #6 - Mark Martin −1 lap
5. #2 - Rusty Wallace −2 laps
6. #42 - Kyle Petty −2 laps
7. #4 - Ernie Irvan −2 laps
8. #15 - Morgan Shepherd −2 laps
9. #11 - Geoff Bodine −2 laps
10. #22 - Sterling Marlin −2 laps

Failed to qualify: #82 - Mark Stahl

=== Valleydale Meats 500 ===
The Valleydale Meats 500 was held April 14 at Bristol Motor Speedway. Rusty Wallace won the pole.

Top-ten results:

1. #2 - Rusty Wallace
2. #4 - Ernie Irvan
3. #28 - Davey Allison
4. #6 - Mark Martin
5. #5 - Ricky Rudd
6. #17 - Darrell Waltrip
7. #21 - Dale Jarrett
8. #98 - Jimmy Spencer
9. #94 - Terry Labonte
10. #15 - Morgan Shepherd −2 laps

Failed to qualify: #52 - Jimmy Means, #70 - J. D. McDuffie, #71 - Dave Marcis

- Sterling Marlin suffered second and third degree burns following a crash late in the race.
- After numerous complaints about the pit road procedure where cars could not pit for tires under caution, NASCAR attempted a new procedure for cautions. When the pits opened, the blue flag waved to permit the odd-numbered cars to pit first. The second lap, the even-numbered cars (based on starting position) would then be able to pit. The blue-sticker cars lined up on the inside, the orange-sticker cars on the outside, and lapped cars to the rear on all restarts. Pit road was open for any car on green flag situations.
- ESPN moved the finish of the race on tape delay because of a rain delay lasting 1 hour and 12 minutes.

=== First Union 400 ===
The First Union 400 was held April 21 at North Wilkesboro Speedway. Brett Bodine won the pole.

Top-ten results:

1. #17 - Darrell Waltrip*
2. #3 - Dale Earnhardt
3. #98 - Jimmy Spencer
4. #15 - Morgan Shepherd
5. #25 - Ken Schrader
6. #28 - Davey Allison
7. #30 - Michael Waltrip
8. #9 - Bill Elliott
9. #6 - Mark Martin
10. #4 - Ernie Irvan

Failed to qualify: #19 - Chad Little, #41 - Larry Pearson, #44 - Irv Hoerr, #47 - Rich Bickle, #51 - Jeff Purvis, #52 - Jimmy Means, #70 - J. D. McDuffie, #76 - Bill Sedgwick

- NASCAR tinkered and modified the pit procedure one final time. The odd/even policy was abandoned. On the first lap of a caution flag after the field had lined up behind the pace car, all cars on the lead lap could pit. On the second lap of caution following the opening of pit road, all of the cars that were not on the lead lap could pit. The rule was waived if NASCAR called a "quickie caution". A new pit speed limit was implemented, and for the remainder of the 1991 season, cars would be run through pit road for tachometer readings. The use of a "second" pace car during cautions for the pit road (to control the speed) was abandoned. The pit speed limit was in place for all situations when a car was on pit road, including green flag stops. A violation of the speed limit on entrance was subject to a 15-second holding penalty before the car exited the pit. A violation on exit was subject to a stop-and-go penalty. A violation under caution resulted in being sent to the rear of the field on the ensuing restart.
- By winning this race, Waltrip became the seventh different winner in the first seven races of the season, the longest such streak since 1964, and breaking the modern era record.
- Sterling Marlin, still recovering from burns suffered in his accident the previous week, was relieved by Charlie Glotzbach shortly after the start of the race.

=== Hanes 500 ===
The Hanes 500 was held April 28 at Martinsville Speedway. Mark Martin won the pole.

Top-ten results:

1. #3 - Dale Earnhardt*
2. #42 - Kyle Petty
3. #17 - Darrell Waltrip
4. #26 - Brett Bodine
5. #33 - Harry Gant −1 lap
6. #98 - Jimmy Spencer −1 lap
7. #30 - Michael Waltrip −1 lap
8. #28 - Davey Allison −1 lap
9. #7 - Alan Kulwicki −3 laps
10. #12 - Hut Stricklin −4 laps

Failed to qualify: #10 - Derrike Cope, #52 - Jimmy Means, #68 - Bobby Hamilton, #70 - J. D. McDuffie, #71 - Dave Marcis

- This victory made Dale Earnhardt the 9th driver to win 50+ NASCAR races.
- Ernie Irvan required relief from Dick Trickle during the race due to heat exhaustion. Trickle had started the race in a different car, but finished last (32nd) after overheating problems popped up after only 12 laps.

=== Winston 500 ===
The Winston 500 was scheduled for Sunday, May 5 but was delayed to Monday, May 6 due to rain at Talladega Superspeedway. Ernie Irvan won the pole.

Top-ten results:

1. #33 - Harry Gant
2. #17 - Darrell Waltrip
3. #3 - Dale Earnhardt*
4. #22 - Sterling Marlin
5. #30 - Michael Waltrip
6. #11 - Geoff Bodine
7. #25 - Ken Schrader
8. #9 - Bill Elliott
9. #98 - Jimmy Spencer
10. #1 - Rick Mast −1 lap

Failed to qualify: #59 - Mark Gibson, #65 - Dave Mader III, #70 - J. D. McDuffie, #77 - Ken Ragan, #53 - Don Paul

- Ernie Irvan was also the center of controversy after "The Big One" on lap 71. Kyle Petty would suffer a compound fracture in his leg, putting him out of racing until the Southern 500 in September.
- During the Big One on lap 71, Mark Martin's car became airborne, lifting to its nose, but it did not flip over.
- Harry Gant won the race on a gas-mileage gamble. He out-lasted Darrell Waltrip and Dale Earnhardt, and reportedly ran out of fuel right after taking the checkered flag.
- A mild controversy stirred up after the race, where it appeared Gant was being pushed by his teammate Rick Mast on the final lap, an action that is illegal on the final lap. Video footage was inconclusive, and the results were unchanged. Gant and Mast insisted they were simply drafting very closely.
- Dale Earnhardt would retake the points lead from Ricky Rudd in this race, and would hold it for the rest of the season.

==== Winston Open ====
The Winston Open, a qualifying race for drivers who are normally not eligible for The Winston, was held May 19 at Charlotte Motor Speedway. Michael Waltrip won the pole. The top three finishers would be eligible to run in The Winston later that day.

Top-five results (Winston Open):

1. #30 - Michael Waltrip
2. #22 - Sterling Marlin
3. #12 - Hut Stricklin
4. #1 - Rick Mast
5. #68 - Bobby Hamilton

=== The Winston ===
The Winston, an invitational event for all past winners in the Cup series and the top three finishers in The Winston Open, was held May 19 at Charlotte Motor Speedway. Davey Allison won the pole.

Top-ten results (The Winston):

1. #28 - Davey Allison
2. #25 - Ken Schrader
3. #17 - Darrell Waltrip
4. #9 - Bill Elliott
5. #4 - Ernie Irvan
6. #30 - Michael Waltrip
7. #2 - Rusty Wallace
8. #12 - Hut Stricklin
9. #33 - Harry Gant
10. #3 - Dale Earnhardt

==== Winston Legends Race ====
During the festivities of The Winston, a special exhibition race of 22 retired NASCAR legends took place on a quarter-mile oval paved in the quad oval segment of the speedway. Elmo Langley battled Cale Yarborough on the final lap, and held him off for the victory by less than a car length. Dick Brooks started on the pole.

Top-ten results:

1. #64 - Elmo Langley
2. #11 - Cale Yarborough
3. #99 - Paul Goldsmith
4. #06 - Neil Castles
5. #28 - Fred Lorenzen
6. #14 - Coo Coo Marlin
7. #61 - Hoss Ellington
8. #90 - Dick Brooks
9. #42 - Marvin Panch
10. #300 - Tim Flock
- The race was shortened by 10 laps due to damp conditions.

=== Coca-Cola 600 ===
The Coca-Cola 600 was held May 26 at Charlotte Motor Speedway. Mark Martin won the pole.

Top-ten results:

1. #28 - Davey Allison
2. #25 - Ken Schrader
3. #3 - Dale Earnhardt
4. #33 - Harry Gant
5. #21 - Dale Jarrett
6. #12 - Hut Stricklin
7. #4 - Ernie Irvan −1 lap
8. #17 - Darrell Waltrip −1 lap
9. #5 - Ricky Rudd −1 lap
10. #94 - Terry Labonte −1 lap

Failed to qualify: #29 - Kerry Teague, #44 - Bobby Labonte, #70 - J. D. McDuffie, #82 - Mark Stahl, #99 - Brad Teague, #86 - Jeff Green

- During the previous week's The Winston, the #11 Junior Johnson-owned Ford was thrown out of the track. Johnson, crew chief Tim Brewer, and substitute driver Tommy Ellis were suspended for 12 weeks for the engine being larger than the legal limit of 358 cubic inches. Regular driver Geoff Bodine was injured in a practice crash for The Winston at Charlotte and was out for two races plus The Winston. All three parties appealed; Johnson and Brewer's suspensions were cut to four races, and Ellis, who drove as a late substitute, had his suspension nullified. Here, Ellis finished the race in 16th, 4 laps down. During the ban, Johnson designated his wife Flossie as the car owner and changed the number of the car to 97.

=== Budweiser 500 ===
The Budweiser 500 was held June 3 at Dover Downs International Speedway. Michael Waltrip won the pole.

Top-ten results:

1. #25 - Ken Schrader*
2. #3 - Dale Earnhardt
3. #33 - Harry Gant
4. #4 - Ernie Irvan
5. #6 - Mark Martin
6. #12 - Hut Stricklin
7. #17 - Darrell Waltrip −1
8. #15 - Morgan Shepherd −2
9. #2 - Rusty Wallace −2
10. #5 - Ricky Rudd −3

Failed to qualify: #45 - Billy Fulcher, #80 - Jimmy Horton, #85 - Bobby Gerhart, #47 - Rich Bickle

- This was Ken Schrader's fourth and final victory in the Winston Cup Series.

=== Banquet Frozen Foods 300 ===
The Banquet Frozen Foods 300 was held June 9 at Sears Point Raceway. Ricky Rudd won the pole.

Top-ten results:

1. #28 - Davey Allison*
2. #5 - Ricky Rudd*
3. #2 - Rusty Wallace
4. #4 - Ernie Irvan
5. #25 - Ken Schrader
6. #94 - Terry Labonte
7. #3 - Dale Earnhardt
8. #97 - Geoff Bodine*
9. #6 - Mark Martin
10. #30 - Michael Waltrip

Failed to qualify: #24w - Butch Gilliland, #44 - Jack Sellers, #93 - Troy Beebe, #20 - Kim Campbell

- A wild finish ended in controversy. With 2 laps remaining, Davey Allison led Ricky Rudd into turn 11 as the cars were anticipating seeing the white flag. Rudd's nose got inside, touched Allison's rear bumper, and Allison spun out with the white flag waving. Allison refired, and got back on to the track to hold on to second position. The next time by, Ricky Rudd was displayed the black flag and penalized 5 seconds for "dirty driving." Allison, the second car in line, was given the checkered flag and declared the winner. Rudd officially dropped back to 2nd place, with the black flag being reduced to a 5-second penalty following Allison's time of victory. After the race, Dave Marcis, a lapped car who was right behind the incident and saw it unfold, claimed that Rudd's tap was not dirty, and in his opinion was simply drivers racing hard on the final lap.
- Geoff Bodine returned after missing two races and The Winston because of an injury during a practice crash for The Winston.

=== Champion Spark Plug 500 ===
The Champion Spark Plug 500 was held June 16 at Pocono Raceway. Mark Martin won the pole.

Top-ten results:

1. #17 - Darrell Waltrip
2. #3 - Dale Earnhardt
3. #6 - Mark Martin
4. #33 - Harry Gant
5. #97 - Geoff Bodine
6. #4 - Ernie Irvan
7. #25 - Ken Schrader
8. #22 - Sterling Marlin
9. #15 - Morgan Shepherd
10. #10 - Derrike Cope

Failed to qualify: none

- This race was plagued by rain, even causing a red flag at one point, but it still ran to the full 500 mile distance.
- During the race, the wife of ESPN color commentator Benny Parsons, Connie, died of an illness. ESPN announcers Bob Jenkins and Ned Jarrett broke word of her death coming back from a commercial. A video exists of the satellite feed, in which Jenkins and Jarrett were informed of Connie's passing (Benny Parsons was in North Carolina with her), and previewed an obituary slide that was shown after the commercial break.
- Bill Elliott, whose day ended early with a valve problem, would leave to return to his hometown of Dawsonville, Georgia, as his grandmother also died later on that same day (when interviewed after his car's problems developed, he mentioned that he had no word of his grandmother's condition at the time of the interview, but that she was still alive before the race began).

=== Miller Genuine Draft 400 ===
The Miller Genuine Draft 400 was held June 23 at Michigan International Speedway. Michael Waltrip won the pole.

Top-ten results:

1. #28 - Davey Allison
2. #12 - Hut Stricklin
3. #6 - Mark Martin
4. #3 - Dale Earnhardt
5. #4 - Ernie Irvan
6. #25 - Ken Schrader
7. #17 - Darrell Waltrip
8. #5 - Ricky Rudd
9. #15 - Morgan Shepherd –1 lap
10. #33 - Harry Gant –1 lap

Failed to qualify: #70 - J. D. McDuffie, #53 - Don Paul

- Geoff Bodine's team reverted to the #11 following owner Junior Johnson's return from his 4-race suspension.

=== Pepsi 400 ===
The Pepsi 400 was held July 6 at Daytona International Speedway. Sterling Marlin won the pole.

Top-ten results:

1. #9 - Bill Elliott
2. #11 - Geoff Bodine
3. #28 - Davey Allison
4. #25 - Ken Schrader
5. #4 - Ernie Irvan
6. #30 - Michael Waltrip
7. #3 - Dale Earnhardt
8. #22 - Sterling Marlin
9. #5 - Ricky Rudd
10. #98 - Jimmy Spencer

Failed to qualify: #95 - Kerry Teague, #70 - J. D. McDuffie*, #80 - Jimmy Horton, #95 - Eddie Bierschwale, #0 - Delma Cowart

- This was Bill Elliott's last victory for Melling Racing. It was also Elliott's only victory in a car that was not predominately red (it was a blue and white Ford Thunderbird, sponsored by Coors Light).
- This was the final race in which J. D. McDuffie would fail to qualify.
- This race was the first race Benny Parsons covered for ESPN after the loss of his wife Connie three weeks earlier.
- A bizarre incident involving Terry Labonte occurred on lap 8. Labonte would drop out of the race claiming an engine vibration, but when the car was tested in the garage, the engine was working normally. By that time, however, Labonte had already left and with the team unable to find a replacement driver, it was ultimately decided that the car would not attempt to return to the race. However, more info about this came to light in a book called Behind The Wall by Richard Huff where Labonte stated that the wrong car type was brought to the track (Intermediate car instead of Superspeedway car) and Labonte refused to continue due to the car being so slow.

=== Miller Genuine Draft 500 ===
The Miller Genuine Draft 500 was held July 21 at Pocono Raceway. Alan Kulwicki won the pole. The race was shortened to 179 laps due to rain.

Top-ten results:

1. #2 - Rusty Wallace*
2. #6 - Mark Martin
3. #11 - Geoff Bodine
4. #12 - Hut Stricklin
5. #22 - Sterling Marlin
6. #21 - Dale Jarrett
7. #4 - Ernie Irvan
8. #26 - Brett Bodine
9. #9 - Bill Elliott −1 lap
10. #75 - Joe Ruttman −1 lap

Failed to qualify: #85 - Bobby Gerhart, #63 - Norm Benning, #86 - Walter Surma, #48 - James Hylton

- When the red flag was thrown for rain, Rusty Wallace's car was nearly out of gas. The red flag was out for over two hours before the track dried and the cars were started again under a yellow condition. However, after just running 1 lap under yellow the rain started falling again. Rusty Wallace was very close to running out of gas, so he was pushed around by Dale Earnhardt so that he wouldn't run out of gas. Once the field was given the white flag, Earnhardt backed off. Under NASCAR rules, this is legal unless it is the final scheduled lap of the race.
- This was the final race J. D. McDuffie actually finished on track in. He finished in 25th, 27 laps down to the winner.

=== DieHard 500 ===
The DieHard 500 was held July 28 at Talladega Superspeedway. Sterling Marlin won the pole.

Top-ten results:

1. #3 - Dale Earnhardt
2. #9 - Bill Elliott
3. #6 - Mark Martin
4. #5 - Ricky Rudd
5. #22 - Sterling Marlin
6. #2 - Rusty Wallace
7. #30 - Michael Waltrip
8. #21 - Dale Jarrett
9. #28 - Davey Allison
10. #75 - Joe Ruttman

Failed to qualify: #0 - Delma Cowart, #51 - Jeff Purvis, #86 - Walter Surma, #59 - Mark Gibson

=== Budweiser at The Glen ===
The Budweiser at The Glen was held August 11 at Watkins Glen International. Terry Labonte won the pole. The race was marred by the death of veteran J. D. McDuffie in a Lap 5 crash in the Loop with Jimmy Means. The other drivers were not informed of McDuffie's death until after the race.

Top-ten results:

1. #4 - Ernie Irvan
2. #5 - Ricky Rudd
3. #6 - Mark Martin
4. #2 - Rusty Wallace
5. #21 - Dale Jarrett
6. #17 - Darrell Waltrip
7. #9 - Bill Elliott
8. #12 - Hut Stricklin
9. #43 - Richard Petty*
10. #28 - Davey Allison

Failed to qualify: #89 - Jim Sauter, #65 - Jerry O'Neil, #45 - Ed Ferree

- The wreck that claimed J. D. McDuffie's life resulted in a nearly 2 hour long red flag to repair the Armco barrier and remove the two wrecked race cars.
- McDuffie's crash was just one in a long series of big wrecks in the Loop-Chute area at Watkins Glen in 1991. Before this crash, Tommy Kendall had broken both legs in the IMSA Camel Continental race in June after spinning out at 180 mph and hitting the Armco head on. Multiple drivers in the Winston Cup Series and in IROC crashed in Turn 5 during the August race weekend. A bus stop chicane (Inner Loop) was added before the entrance of Turn 5 for the 1992 season to slow cars before the entrance of what is now the Carousel.
- Chip Williams, a media coordinator for NASCAR, made the first announcement of McDuffie's death, which was after the red flag period ended, in an interview with Jerry Punch of ESPN that was simulcast on Motor Racing Network.
- This was Richard Petty's 555th and final career top-10.

=== Champion Spark Plug 400 ===
The Champion Spark Plug 400 was held August 18 at Michigan International Speedway. Alan Kulwicki won the pole.

Top-ten results:

1. #21 - Dale Jarrett*
2. #28 - Davey Allison
3. #2 - Rusty Wallace
4. #6 - Mark Martin
5. #9 - Bill Elliott
6. #33 - Harry Gant
7. #4 - Ernie Irvan
8. #7 - Alan Kulwicki
9. #30 - Michael Waltrip
10. #25 - Ken Schrader −1 lap

Failed to qualify: #53 - John Paul Jr., #82 - Mark Stahl

- This was Dale Jarrett's first career Winston Cup victory. Jarrett raced door to door to the finish line with Davey Allison. The official margin of victory was 10 inches. The win was special to Dale's father Ned Jarrett who was in the ESPN broadcast booth for the telecast.

=== Bud 500 ===
The Bud 500 was held August 24 at Bristol International Raceway. Bill Elliott won the pole.

Top-ten results:

1. #7 - Alan Kulwicki
2. #22 - Sterling Marlin
3. #25 - Ken Schrader
4. #6 - Mark Martin −1 lap
5. #5 - Ricky Rudd −1 lap
6. #15 - Morgan Shepherd −2 laps
7. #3 - Dale Earnhardt −2 laps
8. #17 - Darrell Waltrip −2 laps
9. #94 - Terry Labonte −7 laps
10. #26 - Brett Bodine −7 laps

Failed to qualify: #41 - Larry Pearson, #52 - Jimmy Means

- Jimmy Spencer led the majority of the race and appeared to be on his way to his first victory, but two late pit stop errors cost him the victory and Spencer would eventually fall to mechanical issues.
- During the race, Rick Wilson needed relief from Bobby Labonte after Wilson was suffering from flu-like symptoms.

=== Heinz Southern 500 ===
The Heinz Southern 500 was held September 1 at Darlington Raceway. Davey Allison won the pole.

Top-ten results:

1. #33 - Harry Gant
2. #4 - Ernie Irvan
3. #25 - Ken Schrader
4. #10 - Derrike Cope −1 lap
5. #94 - Terry Labonte −1 lap
6. #22 - Sterling Marlin −2 laps
7. #11 - Geoff Bodine −2 laps
8. #3 - Dale Earnhardt −2 laps
9. #75 - Joe Ruttman −2 laps
10. #68 - Bobby Hamilton −3 laps

Failed to qualify: #36 - H.B. Bailey

- This was Kyle Petty's first race since breaking his leg at Talladega in May.
- No driver was eligible for the Winston Million; however, three drivers going into this race (Ernie Irvan, Davey Allison, and Harry Gant) were eligible for a $100,000 bonus from Winston if a driver were to win 2 out of the 4 NASCAR majors. Gant won the bonus by winning the Winston 500 and this race.

=== Miller Genuine Draft 400 ===
The Miller Genuine Draft 400 was held September 7 at Richmond International Raceway. Rusty Wallace won the pole.

Top-ten results:

1. #33 - Harry Gant
2. #28 - Davey Allison
3. #2 - Rusty Wallace
4. #4 - Ernie Irvan
5. #5 - Ricky Rudd
6. #7 - Alan Kulwicki
7. #17 - Darrell Waltrip
8. #25 - Ken Schrader
9. #9 - Bill Elliott
10. #22 - Sterling Marlin −1 lap

Failed to qualify: #48 - James Hylton, #56 - Jerry Hill, #73 - Dale Fischlein

- This was the 1st night race for the Winston Cup Series held at Richmond International Raceway.
- Richard Petty led his lone lap of 1991; it also was the only lap he ever led on the 3/4 mile configuration of Richmond.

=== Peak Antifreeze 500 ===
The Peak Antifreeze 500 was held September 15 at Dover Downs International Speedway. Alan Kulwicki won the pole.

Top-ten results:

1. #33 - Harry Gant*
2. #11 - Geoff Bodine −1 lap
3. #15 - Morgan Shepherd −1 lap
4. #12 - Hut Stricklin −1 lap
5. #30 - Michael Waltrip −2 laps
6. #24 - Dick Trickle* −4 laps
7. #5 - Ricky Rudd −7 laps
8. #68 - Bobby Hamilton −7 laps
9. #1 - Rick Mast −7 laps
10. #71 - Dave Marcis −10 laps
- Harry Gant's official margin of victory in this race was 1 lap, and an additional 19 seconds.
- Gant's decisive victory was aided by a freak accident on lap 324 that eliminated Alan Kulwicki, Rusty Wallace, and Dale Earnhardt from contention.
- Dick Trickle's last start of 1991 ended up as his best finish of 1991 (6th).

=== Goody's 500 ===
The Goody's 500 was held September 22 at Martinsville Speedway. Mark Martin won the pole.

Top-ten results:

1. #33 - Harry Gant*
2. #26 - Brett Bodine
3. #3 - Dale Earnhardt
4. #4 - Ernie Irvan
5. #6 - Mark Martin
6. #94 - Terry Labonte
7. #2 - Rusty Wallace
8. #5 - Ricky Rudd
9. #25 - Ken Schrader
10. #24 - Jimmy Hensley

Failed to qualify: #52 - Jimmy Means

- This was Harry Gant's 4th consecutive victory, tying the modern-era record. Gant more or less dominated the race but crashed on lap 377 in Turn 3. The crash damaged the right front of Gant's Oldsmobile. This incident led ESPN's race analyst Benny Parsons to discount Gant as a threat to win the race. The team repaired the car the best they could, and sent Gant back out. Gant proceeded to charge up through the field and overtook Brett Bodine for the victory with about 50 laps to go.
- Gant's four victories throughout September, combined with two other victories in the Busch Series, gave Gant the new nickname "Mr. September."

=== Tyson Holly Farms 400 ===
The Tyson Holly Farms 400 was held September 29 at North Wilkesboro Speedway. Harry Gant won the pole.

Top-ten results:

1. #3 - Dale Earnhardt*
2. #33 - Harry Gant
3. #15 - Morgan Shepherd
4. #28 - Davey Allison
5. #6 - Mark Martin
6. #2 - Rusty Wallace
7. #26 - Brett Bodine*
8. #25 - Ken Schrader
9. #21 - Dale Jarrett
10. #7 - Alan Kulwicki

Failed to qualify: #89 - Jim Sauter

- Dale Earnhardt passed Harry Gant for the victory with 12 laps to go, denying Gant a 5th consecutive victory. Gant had dominated the race when with just a few laps to go an O-Ring failed to give Gant limited braking for the final few laps allowing Earnhardt to pass.
- Earnhardt's victory would be the last win for a GM brand until his victory in the 1992 Coca-Cola 600.
- Brett Bodine's 7th-place finish came despite having to start at the rear of the field due to an emergency pit stop prior to the green flag start when his car began leaking fluid during the pace laps.

=== Mello Yello 500 ===
The Mello Yello 500 was held October 6 at Charlotte Motor Speedway. Mark Martin won the pole.

Top-ten results:

1. #11 - Geoff Bodine
2. #28 - Davey Allison
3. #7 - Alan Kulwicki −1 lap
4. #33 - Harry Gant −1 lap
5. #22 - Sterling Marlin −3 laps
6. #94 - Terry Labonte −4 laps
7. #30 - Michael Waltrip −4 laps
8. #26 - Brett Bodine −4 laps
9. #17 - Darrell Waltrip −5 laps
10. #19 - Chad Little −5 laps

Failed to qualify: #0 - Delma Cowart, #41 - Larry Pearson, #76 - Robbie Faggart, #20 - Buddy Baker, #51 - Jeff Purvis, #74 - Mike Potter, #89 - Jim Sauter, #87 - Randy Baker, #72 - Tracy Leslie

- Five days before this race, Richard Petty held a press conference at his Level Cross, North Carolina race shop. Petty said that instead of retiring at the end of 1991, he would race for one more year. The 1992 NASCAR Winston Cup Series, his last as a driver, would be dubbed the "Fan Appreciation Tour". Petty denied it was a farewell tour because he "wasn't going anywhere".
- With this race and continuing into the beginning of 1992, the Ford brand would win 13 races in a row (the last four races in 1991 and the first nine races in 1992)

=== AC Delco 500 ===
The AC Delco 500 was held October 20 at North Carolina Speedway. Kyle Petty won the pole.

Top-ten results:

1. #28 - Davey Allison
2. #33 - Harry Gant
3. #6 - Mark Martin
4. #11 - Geoff Bodine
5. #25 - Ken Schrader −1 lap
6. #68 - Bobby Hamilton −2 laps
7. #3 - Dale Earnhardt −2 laps
8. #22 - Sterling Marlin −2 laps
9. #42 - Kyle Petty −2 laps
10. #9 - Bill Elliott −2 laps

Failed to qualify: #53 - Bobby Hillin Jr., #05 - Bill Meacham

=== Pyroil 500K ===
The Pyroil 500K was held November 3 at Phoenix International Raceway. Geoff Bodine won the pole.

Top-ten results:

1. #28 - Davey Allison
2. #17 - Darrell Waltrip
3. #22 - Sterling Marlin
4. #7 - Alan Kulwicki
5. #2 - Rusty Wallace
6. #4 - Ernie Irvan
7. #98 - Jimmy Spencer −1 lap
8. #11 - Geoff Bodine −1 lap
9. #3 - Dale Earnhardt −1 lap
10. #15 - Morgan Shepherd −1 lap

Failed to qualify: #93 - Troy Beebe, #44 - Jack Sellers, #89 - Jim Sauter, #00 - Scott Gaylord

=== Hardee's 500 ===
The Hardee's 500 was held November 17 at Atlanta Motor Speedway. Bill Elliott won the pole.

Top-ten results:

1. #6 - Mark Martin
2. #4 - Ernie Irvan
3. #9 - Bill Elliott
4. #33 - Harry Gant
5. #3 - Dale Earnhardt*
6. #15 - Morgan Shepherd
7. #22 - Sterling Marlin −1
8. #11 - Geoff Bodine −1
9. #7 - Alan Kulwicki −2
10. #17 - Darrell Waltrip −2

Failed to qualify: #0 - Delma Cowart, #13 - Kerry Teague, #35 - Bill Venturini, #36 - H. B. Bailey, #59 - Mark Gibson, #65 - Dave Mader III, #65 - Keith van Houten

- This was the race in which Dale Earnhardt clinched his fifth Winston Cup championship. ESPN ran a comedic segment on "How to Steal a Championship" where two crew members from Davey Allison and Ricky Rudd's teams, which were second and third in points respectively, attempted to steal Earnhardt's driving uniform and helmet so Earnhardt could not start the race. Those efforts were thwarted by longtime Earnhardt crewman Chocolate Myers and Earnhardt won by merely starting the race and completing the first lap.

== Full Drivers' Championship ==
(key) Bold – Pole position awarded by time. Italics – Pole position set by owner's points. * – Most laps led.

Pos	Driver	DAY	RCH	CAR	ATL	DAR	BRI	NWS	MAR	TAL	CLT	DOV	SON	POC	MCH	DAY	POC	TAL	GLN	MCH	BRI	DAR	RCH	DOV	MAR	NWS	CLT	CAR	PHO	ATL	Pts
1	Dale Earnhardt	5	1	8	3	29	20	2	1*	3*	3	2*	7	2	4	7	22	1*	15	24	7	8	11	15	3	1	25	7	9	5	4287
2	Ricky Rudd	9	2*	4	6	1	5*	11	11	13	9	10	**2**	20	8	9	20	4	2	11	5	15	5	7	8	12	32	12	11	11	4092
3	Davey Allison	**15**	**12**	16	40	2	3	6	8	22	1*	16	1	12	1*	3	14	9	10	2*	24	**12**	2*	31	29	4	2	1	1*	17	4088
4	Harry Gant	25	3	3	19	27	11	23	5	1	4	33	27	4	10	23	26	39	28	6	19	1*	1	1*	1*	**2***	4	2*	23	4	3985
5	Ernie Irvan	1	27	6	14	7	2	10	15	**32**	7	4	4	6	5	5*	7*	33	1	7	18	2	4	28	4	33	30	31	6	2	3925
6	Mark Martin	21	6	14	17	4	4	9	**29**	24	**23**	5	9	**3**	3	11	2	3	3	4	4	29	33	21	**5**	5	**35***	3	19	1*	3914
7	Sterling Marlin	2	9	33	7	10	27	22	28	4	11	15	26	8	13	**8**	5	**5**	12	12	2	6	10	17	14	13	5	8	3	7	3839
8	Darrell Waltrip	24	7	9	9	25	6	1	3	2	8	7	25	1	7	32	29	15	6	32	8	24	7	19	15	20	9	32	2	10	3711
9	Ken Schrader	31	10	2	1	19	29	5	23	7	2	1	5	7	6	4	23	40	30	10	3	3	8	33	9	8	38	5	17	37	3690
10	Rusty Wallace	27	4	28	10	5	**1**	32	21	26	22	9	3*	31	17	12	1	6	4	3	32	32	**3**	25	7	6	27	11	5	34	3582
11	Bill Elliott	28	30	5	2*	12	28	8	26	8	26	13	20	36	11	1	9	2	7	5	**21**	18	9	11	27	24	11	10	25	**3**	3535
12	Morgan Shepherd	34	8	10	4	8	10	4	30	14	14	8	42	9	9	20	34	14	36	26	6	19	23	3	11	3	28	17	10	6	3438
13	Alan Kulwicki	8	5	17	**8**	34	26	29	9	27	35	14	17	16	24	14	**16**	16	23	**8**	1	35	6	**24**	22	10	3	33	4	9	3354
14	Geoff Bodine	32	13	12	23	**9**	24	28	20	6			8	5	39	2	3	30	22	35	31	7	14	2	23	15	1	4	**8**	8	3277
15	Michael Waltrip	38	17	7	5	3*	23	7	7	5	15	**32**	10	18	**34**	6	38	7	21	9	25	27	30	5	25	27	7	19	24	40	3254
16	Hut Stricklin	29	22	31	13	32	16	14	10	23	6	6	35	28	2	16	4	29	8	14	22	17	21	4	16	17	36	13	39	13	3199
17	Dale Jarrett	6	21	11	20	39	7	25	12	35	5	35	41	19	12	18	6	8	5	1	28	25	20	34	18	9	26	25	35	16	3124
18	Terry Labonte	13	14	39	35	15	9	31	31	37	10	24	6	21	25	41	15	24	**34**	16	9	5	19	26	6	14	6	28	12	15	3024
19	Brett Bodine	22	24	13	15	16	22	**30***	4	11	28	33	11	33	36	36	8	32	25	37	10	14	18	32	2	7	8	30	14	29	2980
20	Joe Ruttman	3	29	24	27	26	13	24	16	29	21	12	31	22	19	31	10	10	14	30	17	9	28	13	31	29	16	27	22	20	2938
21	Rick Mast	4	35	30	29	13	18	12	13	10	30	20	19	25	29	19	27	28	35	18	26	11	27	9	13	25	13	18	28	28	2918
22	Bobby Hamilton **(R)**	10	28	21	33	20	31	21	DNQ	12	27	11	22	35	22	28	11	34	29	19	13	10	12	8	17	18	29	6	13	18	2915
23	Ted Musgrave **(R)**	30	19	25	37	21	12	17	24	16	17	18	37	27	21	37	13	26	29	17	16	20	22	14	20	22	14	21	18	30	2841
24	Richard Petty	19	11	15	38	37	17	16	14	40	20	17	34	11	35	22	31	18	9	23	12	16	24	20	30	19	12	16	41	22	2817
25	Jimmy Spencer	40	34	38	16	11	8	3	6	9	31	28	29	14	32	10	37	37	27	36	15*	31	15	18	28	23	23	22	7	38	2750
26	Rick Wilson	33	18	19	12	14	33	27	22	25	18	25	16	13	31	24	24	38	19	39	20	13	13	29	26	32	17	20	15	33	2723
27	Chad Little	14	16	22	18	36	14	DNQ	27	38	25	29	28	23	26	29	12	12	11	25	14	36	34	16	24	21	10	23	30	21	2678
28	Derrike Cope	26	32	34	11	31	32	15	DNQ	28	12	27	30	10	41	17	36	35	13	34	29	4	16	36	19	30	33	15	16	24	2516
29	Dave Marcis	35	33	23	36	18	DNQ	19	DNQ	18	32	23	24	24	16	25	18	21	37	20	23	33	29	10	21	31	34	26	40	12	2374
30	Bobby Hillin Jr.	7	20	18	21	17	15	20	17	17	19	19	21	15	15	15	28	11	18	33	30						18	DNQ		32	2317
31	Kyle Petty	16*	25	**1***	39	6	21	18	2	33												22	26	12	12	16	15	**9**	20	19	2078
32	Lake Speed					40	25	13	18	31	29	22	12	17	18	38	30	36	33	15	11	34	17	35	32						1742
33	Jimmy Means	39	31	27	31	23	DNQ	DNQ	DNQ	20	38			26	27	26	21	23	39	27	DNQ	28	35	23	DNQ	28	24	35			1562
34	Mickey Gibbs	17	23	20	25	22	19	33	25	15	34	30	14	30	14	27															1401
35	Dick Trickle	11	15	29	28		30	26	32		40						35	20		21	27	23		6							1258
36	Stanley Smith **(R)**			37	DNQ					21	36		23		23	40		31		40				22			22		36	25	893
37	Larry Pearson							DNQ		41	41			32	20	21		17			DNQ	30	36	30			DNQ		33	14	841
38	Wally Dallenbach Jr. **(R)**				26					34	33				28	34		41	32	22			25	QL			19			36	803
39	Greg Sacks	42								39	39				DNQ	39	17	19				21	32	DNQ	DNQ		31	29		26	791
40	Buddy Baker	37								36					30	13		13		13				DNQ			DNQ				552
41	Jimmy Hensley																								10	11	20	14			488
42	Eddie Bierschwale	12									24				38	DNQ		27						DNQ						27	431
43	Jim Sauter	23			22						37				37				DNQ	31						DNQ	DNQ		DNQ	35	423
44	Kenny Wallace										13	26											31						43	23	412
45	Jeff Purvis **(R)**	36		35	24			DNQ		30					DNQ	30		DNQ						DNQ					38		399
46	Phil Barkdoll	20								19						35		22													364
47	Mike Chase												40			33		25		29									26		356
48	J. D. McDuffie	DNQ	DNQ	DNQ		30	DNQ	DNQ	DNQ	DNQ	DNQ	31		34	DNQ	DNQ	25		40												335
49	Bill Sedgwick							DNQ	19				15																21		324
50	Randy LaJoie													29														24	32	31	304
51	Rich Bickle **(R)**	DNQ		26	34	24		DNQ				DNQ																			237
52	Irv Hoerr							DNQ					36				19		38												210
53	H. B. Bailey				DNQ	35									33					28		DNQ								DNQ	201
54	James Hylton													37			DNQ					38	DNQ	37	DNQ			40			196
55	Robby Gordon	18	26																												194
56	John Paul Jr.																32		16	DNQ											182
57	Bill Schmitt												13																37		176
58	Randy Baker					28																26					DNQ				164
59	Dorsey Schroeder **(R)**	DNQ																	17								41				157
60	Hershel McGriff												32																27		149
61	Dave Mader III **(R)**	DNQ			30	33				DNQ					DNQ									DNQ	DNQ					DNQ	137
62	Mike Wallace																												31	39	116
63	Tommy Kendall												18																		114
64	Andy Hillenburg			40	32																										110
65	Bobby Labonte										DNQ	34								38											110
66	Mike Skinner			32																							40				110
67	Mark Stahl	DNQ	DNQ	DNQ	DNQ	DNQ					DNQ				DNQ					DNQ		37						36			107
68	Bill Meacham			36		38																						DNQ			104
69	Jim Derhaag																		20												103
70	Tommy Ellis										16	21																			100
71	Brad Teague	DNQ									DNQ																21				100
72	Jerry Hill																						DNQ	38				38			94
73	Oma Kimbrough																		24												91
74	Gary Balough	DNQ															40										39				89
75	Bill Venturini	DNQ													40		39													DNQ	89
76	Chuck Bown	DNQ			DNQ																					26					85
77	Steve Perry																							27							82
78	Butch Gilliland												DNQ																29		76
79	Kim Campbell												DNQ						31												70
80	Scott Gaylord												33																DNQ		64
81	Gary Wright			DNQ													33														64
82	Mark Reed																												34		61
83	Ricky Craven																											34			61
84	John Krebs												38																DNQ		54
85	Kerry Teague										DNQ					DNQ											37			DNQ	52
86	Robert Sprague												39																DNQ		51
87	Gary Brooks																											39			46
88	Brian Ross	DNQ																						39							46
89	Andy Belmont																							40							43
90	Sammy Swindell **(R)**	41																													40
91	Gary Collins																												42		37
92	R. K. Smith												43																DNQ		34
93	Keith van Houten																											37		DNQ	
94	Phil Parsons	DNQ																													
95	Rick Jeffrey	DNQ																													
96	Philip Duffie	DNQ																													
97	Blackie Wangerin	DNQ																													
98	Jimmy Horton	DNQ			DNQ							DNQ			DNQ	DNQ								DNQ							
99	Delma Cowart	DNQ														DNQ		DNQ									DNQ			DNQ	
100	K. C. Spurlock				DNQ																										
101	Billy Fulcher				DNQ							DNQ												DNQ							
102	Ken Ragan									DNQ																					
103	Donny Paul									DNQ					DNQ																
104	Mark Gibson									DNQ								DNQ												DNQ	
105	Jeff Green										DNQ																				
106	Bobby Gerhart											DNQ					DNQ														
107	Jack Sellers												DNQ																DNQ		
108	Troy Beebe												DNQ																DNQ		
109	Walter Surma														DNQ		DNQ	DNQ													
110	Norm Benning																DNQ														
111	Jerry O'Neil																		DNQ												
112	Ed Ferree																		DNQ												
113	Dale Fischlein																						DNQ								
114	Mike Potter																										DNQ				
115	Robbie Faggart																										DNQ				
116	Tracy Leslie																										DNQ				
117	Rick Scribner																												DNQ		
118	St. James Davis																												DNQ		
119	Rick Carelli																												DNQ		
120	Wayne Jacks																												DNQ		
121	Ron Hornaday Jr.																												DNQ		
122	Billy Jac Shaw																												DNQ		
Pos	Driver	DAY	RCH	CAR	ATL	DAR	BRI	NWS	MAR	TAL	CLT	DOV	SON	POC	MCH	DAY	POC	TAL	GLN	MCH	BRI	DAR	RCH	DOV	MAR	NWS	CLT	CAR	PHO	ATL	Pts

== Rookie of the Year ==
Bobby Hamilton, driving for Tri-Star Motorsports, narrowly defeated Ted Musgrave for Rookie of the Year honors in 1991. Stanley Smith, Wally Dallenbach Jr., and Sammy Swindell also declared for the award, but did not complete enough races to challenge Hamilton or Musgrave.

== See also ==
- 1991 NASCAR Busch Series
- 1991 NASCAR Winston West Series
