= 1991 Peak Antifreeze 500 =

23rd race of the 1991 NASCAR Winston Cup Series

Race details
- Race 23 of 29 in the 1991 NASCAR Winston Cup Series
- The 1991 Peak Antifreeze 500 program cover, featuring Darrell Waltrip.
- Date: September 15, 1991
- Official name: 21st Annual Peak Antifreeze 500
- Location: Dover, Delaware, Dover Downs International Speedway
- Course: Permanent racing facility
- Course length: 1 miles (1.6 km)
- Distance: 500 laps, 500 mi (804.672 km)
- Scheduled distance: 500 laps, 500 mi (804.672 km)
- Average speed: 110.179 miles per hour (177.316 km/h)
- Attendance: 77,000

Pole position
Driver	Alan Kulwicki	AK Racing
- Time: 24.519

Most laps led
Driver	Harry Gant	Leo Jackson Motorsports
- Laps: 326

Winner
No. 33	Harry Gant	Leo Jackson Motorsports

Television in the United States
- Network: TNN
- Announcers: Mike Joy, Buddy Baker, Neil Bonnett

Radio in the United States
- Radio: Motor Racing Network

The 1991 Peak Antifreeze 500 was the 23rd stock car race of the 1991 NASCAR Winston Cup Series season and the 21st iteration of the event. The race was held on Sunday, September 15, 1991, before an audience of 77,000 in Dover, Delaware at Dover Downs International Speedway, a 1-mile (1.6 km) permanent oval-shaped racetrack. The race took the scheduled 500 laps to complete. At race's end, Leo Jackson Motorsports driver Harry Gant would manage to dominate a majority of the race, lapping the field to take his 15th career NASCAR Winston Cup Series victory, his fourth victory of the season, and his third straight victory. To fill out the top three, Junior Johnson & Associates driver Geoff Bodine and Bud Moore Engineering driver Morgan Shepherd would finish second and third, respectively.

== Background ==
The layout of Dover Downs International Speedway, the venue where the race was held.

Dover Downs International Speedway is an oval race track in Dover, Delaware, United States that has held at least two NASCAR races since it opened in 1969. In addition to NASCAR, the track also hosted USAC and the NTT IndyCar Series. The track features one layout, a 1-mile (1.6 km) concrete oval, with 24° banking in the turns and 9° banking on the straights. The speedway is owned and operated by Dover Motorsports.

The track, nicknamed "The Monster Mile", was built in 1969 by Melvin Joseph of Melvin L. Joseph Construction Company, Inc., with an asphalt surface, but was replaced with concrete in 1995. Six years later in 2001, the track's capacity moved to 135,000 seats, making the track have the largest capacity of sports venue in the mid-Atlantic. In 2002, the name changed to Dover International Speedway from Dover Downs International Speedway after Dover Downs Gaming and Entertainment split, making Dover Motorsports. From 2007 to 2009, the speedway worked on an improvement project called "The Monster Makeover", which expanded facilities at the track and beautified the track. After the 2014 season, the track's capacity was reduced to 95,500 seats.

=== Entry list ===
- (R) denotes rookie driver.

#	Driver	Team	Make
1	Rick Mast	Precision Products Racing	Oldsmobile
2	Rusty Wallace	Penske Racing South	Pontiac
3	Dale Earnhardt	Richard Childress Racing	Chevrolet
4	Ernie Irvan	Morgan–McClure Motorsports	Chevrolet
5	Ricky Rudd	Hendrick Motorsports	Chevrolet
6	Mark Martin	Roush Racing	Ford
7	Alan Kulwicki	AK Racing	Ford
8	Rick Wilson	Stavola Brothers Racing	Buick
9	Bill Elliott	Melling Racing	Ford
10	Derrike Cope	Whitcomb Racing	Chevrolet
11	Geoff Bodine	Junior Johnson & Associates	Ford
12	Hut Stricklin	Bobby Allison Motorsports	Buick
15	Morgan Shepherd	Bud Moore Engineering	Ford
17	Darrell Waltrip	Darrell Waltrip Motorsports	Chevrolet
19	Chad Little	Little Racing	Ford
21	Dale Jarrett	Wood Brothers Racing	Ford
22	Sterling Marlin	Junior Johnson & Associates	Ford
24	Dick Trickle	Team III Racing	Pontiac
25	Ken Schrader	Hendrick Motorsports	Chevrolet
26	Brett Bodine	King Racing	Buick
28	Davey Allison	Robert Yates Racing	Ford
30	Michael Waltrip	Bahari Racing	Pontiac
33	Harry Gant	Leo Jackson Motorsports	Oldsmobile
41	Larry Pearson	Larry Hedrick Motorsports	Chevrolet
42	Kyle Petty	SABCO Racing	Pontiac
43	Richard Petty	Petty Enterprises	Pontiac
48	James Hylton	Hylton Motorsports	Buick
49	Stanley Smith (R)	BS&S Motorsports	Buick
52	Jimmy Means	Jimmy Means Racing	Pontiac
55	Ted Musgrave (R)	U.S. Racing	Pontiac
56	Jerry Hill	Hill Motorsports	Pontiac
58	Brian Ross	Ross Racing	Chevrolet
59	Andy Belmont	Pat Rissi Racing	Ford
66	Lake Speed	Cale Yarborough Motorsports	Pontiac
68	Bobby Hamilton (R)	TriStar Motorsports	Oldsmobile
71	Dave Marcis	Marcis Auto Racing	Chevrolet
75	Joe Ruttman	RahMoc Enterprises	Oldsmobile
90	Steve Perry	Donlavey Racing	Ford
94	Terry Labonte	Hagan Racing	Oldsmobile
98	Jimmy Spencer	Travis Carter Enterprises	Chevrolet

== Qualifying ==
Qualifying was split into two rounds. The first round was held on Friday, September 13, at 3:00 PM EST. Each driver would have one lap to set a time. During the first round, the top 20 drivers in the round would be guaranteed a starting spot in the race. If a driver was not able to guarantee a spot in the first round, they had the option to scrub their time from the first round and try and run a faster lap time in a second round qualifying run, held on Saturday, September 14, at 11:30 AM EST. As with the first round, each driver would have one lap to set a time. For this specific race, positions 21-40 would be decided on time, and depending on who needed it, a select amount of positions were given to cars who had not otherwise qualified on time but were high enough in owner's points; up to two were given. If needed, a past champion who did not qualify on either time or provisionals could use a champion's provisional, adding one more spot to the field.

Alan Kulwicki, driving for his own AK Racing team, won the pole, setting a time of 24.519 and an average speed of 146.825 mph (236.292 km/h) in the first round.

No drivers would fail to qualify.

=== Full qualifying results ===
Pos.	#	Driver	Team	Make	Time	Speed
1	7	Alan Kulwicki	AK Racing	Ford	24.519	146.825
2	28	Davey Allison	Robert Yates Racing	Ford	24.548	146.651
3	11	Geoff Bodine	Junior Johnson & Associates	Ford	24.583	146.443
4	6	Mark Martin	Roush Racing	Ford	24.584	146.437
5	4	Ernie Irvan	Morgan–McClure Motorsports	Chevrolet	24.621	146.217
6	25	Ken Schrader	Hendrick Motorsports	Chevrolet	24.676	145.891
7	2	Rusty Wallace	Penske Racing South	Pontiac	24.702	145.737
8	21	Dale Jarrett	Wood Brothers Racing	Ford	24.702	145.737
9	22	Sterling Marlin	Junior Johnson & Associates	Ford	24.705	145.719
10	33	Harry Gant	Leo Jackson Motorsports	Oldsmobile	24.710	145.690
11	24	Dick Trickle	Team III Racing	Pontiac	24.752	145.443
12	3	Dale Earnhardt	Richard Childress Racing	Chevrolet	24.767	145.355
13	30	Michael Waltrip	Bahari Racing	Pontiac	24.779	145.284
14	17	Darrell Waltrip	Darrell Waltrip Motorsports	Chevrolet	24.793	145.202
15	41	Larry Pearson	Larry Hedrick Motorsports	Chevrolet	24.803	145.144
16	68	Bobby Hamilton (R)	TriStar Motorsports	Oldsmobile	24.923	144.445
17	55	Ted Musgrave (R)	U.S. Racing	Pontiac	24.955	144.260
18	42	Kyle Petty	SABCO Racing	Pontiac	24.982	144.104
19	12	Hut Stricklin	Bobby Allison Motorsports	Buick	24.988	144.069
20	1	Rick Mast	Precision Products Racing	Oldsmobile	24.996	144.023
Failed to lock in Round 1
21	15	Morgan Shepherd	Bud Moore Engineering	Ford	24.898	144.590
22	8	Rick Wilson	Stavola Brothers Racing	Buick	24.923	144.445
23	94	Terry Labonte	Hagan Racing	Oldsmobile	25.011	143.937
24	5	Ricky Rudd	Hendrick Motorsports	Chevrolet	25.036	143.793
25	19	Chad Little	Little Racing	Ford	25.081	143.535
26	26	Brett Bodine	King Racing	Buick	25.105	143.398
27	66	Lake Speed	Cale Yarborough Motorsports	Pontiac	25.159	143.090
28	10	Derrike Cope	Whitcomb Racing	Chevrolet	25.171	143.022
29	43	Richard Petty	Petty Enterprises	Pontiac	25.177	142.988
30	9	Bill Elliott	Melling Racing	Ford	25.213	142.783
31	71	Dave Marcis	Marcis Auto Racing	Chevrolet	25.245	142.602
32	49	Stanley Smith (R)	BS&S Motorsports	Buick	25.248	142.586
33	75	Joe Ruttman	RahMoc Enterprises	Oldsmobile	25.385	141.816
34	98	Jimmy Spencer	Travis Carter Enterprises	Chevrolet	25.438	141.521
35	52	Jimmy Means	Jimmy Means Racing	Pontiac	25.799	139.540
36	58	Brian Ross	Ross Racing	Chevrolet	26.582	135.430
37	90	Steve Perry	Donlavey Racing	Ford	26.987	133.398
38	56	Jerry Hill	Hill Motorsports	Pontiac	27.511	130.857
39	48	James Hylton	Hylton Motorsports	Buick	27.858	129.227
40	59	Andy Belmont	Pat Rissi Racing	Ford	28.226	127.542
Official first round qualifying results
Official starting lineup

== Race results ==
Fin	St	#	Driver	Team	Make	Laps	Led	Status	Pts	Winnings
1	10	33	Harry Gant	Leo Jackson Motorsports	Oldsmobile	500	326	running	185	$67,100
2	3	11	Geoff Bodine	Junior Johnson & Associates	Ford	499	2	running	175	$42,225
3	21	15	Morgan Shepherd	Bud Moore Engineering	Ford	499	0	running	165	$31,250
4	19	12	Hut Stricklin	Bobby Allison Motorsports	Buick	499	0	running	160	$20,350
5	13	30	Michael Waltrip	Bahari Racing	Pontiac	498	0	running	155	$17,625
6	11	24	Dick Trickle	Team III Racing	Pontiac	496	0	running	150	$11,850
7	24	5	Ricky Rudd	Hendrick Motorsports	Chevrolet	493	1	running	151	$15,800
8	16	68	Bobby Hamilton (R)	TriStar Motorsports	Oldsmobile	493	0	running	142	$10,950
9	20	1	Rick Mast	Precision Products Racing	Oldsmobile	493	0	running	138	$11,450
10	31	71	Dave Marcis	Marcis Auto Racing	Chevrolet	490	0	running	134	$13,050
11	30	9	Bill Elliott	Melling Racing	Ford	488	0	running	130	$14,400
12	18	42	Kyle Petty	SABCO Racing	Pontiac	470	0	crash	127	$12,900
13	33	75	Joe Ruttman	RahMoc Enterprises	Oldsmobile	463	0	running	124	$9,200
14	17	55	Ted Musgrave (R)	U.S. Racing	Pontiac	454	0	running	121	$6,850
15	12	3	Dale Earnhardt	Richard Childress Racing	Chevrolet	447	21	running	123	$16,700
16	25	19	Chad Little	Little Racing	Ford	443	0	running	115	$5,950
17	9	22	Sterling Marlin	Junior Johnson & Associates	Ford	429	0	running	112	$5,750
18	34	98	Jimmy Spencer	Travis Carter Enterprises	Chevrolet	402	0	crash	109	$7,485
19	14	17	Darrell Waltrip	Darrell Waltrip Motorsports	Chevrolet	395	0	camshaft	106	$5,300
20	29	43	Richard Petty	Petty Enterprises	Pontiac	389	0	engine	103	$6,200
21	4	6	Mark Martin	Roush Racing	Ford	366	0	overheating	100	$13,450
22	32	49	Stanley Smith (R)	BS&S Motorsports	Buick	364	0	overheating	97	$4,400
23	35	52	Jimmy Means	Jimmy Means Racing	Pontiac	345	0	overheating	94	$4,350
24	1	7	Alan Kulwicki	AK Racing	Ford	323	8	crash	96	$15,800
25	7	2	Rusty Wallace	Penske Racing South	Pontiac	322	28	crash	93	$5,025
26	23	94	Terry Labonte	Hagan Racing	Oldsmobile	302	0	engine	85	$6,850
27	37	90	Steve Perry	Donlavey Racing	Ford	244	0	engine	82	$4,150
28	5	4	Ernie Irvan	Morgan–McClure Motorsports	Chevrolet	202	0	overheating	79	$11,100
29	22	8	Rick Wilson	Stavola Brothers Racing	Buick	165	0	crash	76	$6,675
30	15	41	Larry Pearson	Larry Hedrick Motorsports	Chevrolet	159	0	steering	73	$4,000
31	2	28	Davey Allison	Robert Yates Racing	Ford	115	114	engine	75	$14,200
32	26	26	Brett Bodine	King Racing	Buick	115	0	crash	67	$6,500
33	6	25	Ken Schrader	Hendrick Motorsports	Chevrolet	68	0	crash	64	$5,850
34	8	21	Dale Jarrett	Wood Brothers Racing	Ford	68	0	crash	61	$5,800
35	27	66	Lake Speed	Cale Yarborough Motorsports	Pontiac	67	0	crash	58	$5,600
36	28	10	Derrike Cope	Whitcomb Racing	Chevrolet	67	0	crash	55	$11,975
37	39	48	James Hylton	Hylton Motorsports	Buick	54	0	flagged	52	$3,550
38	38	56	Jerry Hill	Hill Motorsports	Pontiac	39	0	vibration	49	$3,500
39	36	58	Brian Ross	Ross Racing	Chevrolet	37	0	steering	46	$3,475
40	40	59	Andy Belmont	Pat Rissi Racing	Ford	11	0	flagged	43	$3,450
Official race results

== Standings after the results ==
Drivers' Championship standings

	Pos	Driver	Points
	1	Dale Earnhardt	3,400
	2	Ricky Rudd	3,364 (-36)
	3	Ernie Irvan	3,223 (-177)
	4	Davey Allison	3,195 (–205)
1	5	Mark Martin	3,065 (–335)
1	6	Ken Schrader	3,037 (–363)
2	7	Harry Gant	3,021 (–379)
1	8	Sterling Marlin	2,981 (–419)
1	9	Darrell Waltrip	2,971 (–429)
	10	Rusty Wallace	2,853 (–547)
Official driver's standings

- Note: Only the first 10 positions are included for the driver standings.

Previous race: 1991 Miller Genuine Draft 400 (Richmond)	NASCAR Winston Cup Series; 1991 season	Next race: 1991 Goody's 500
