= Gary Wright (racing driver) =

American racing driver (born 1958)

- Born: December 19, 1958 (age 67); Hooks, Texas, U.S.

NASCAR Cup Series career
- 1 race run over 3 years
- Best finish: 80th (1991)
- First race: 1991 Miller Genuine Draft 500 (Pocono)
Wins	Top tens	Poles
0	0	0

Gary Wright (Born December 19, 1958) is a current American Sprint Car Series and former NASCAR and ARCA Racing Series driver. He is the all-time winningest driver in ASCS history, with 124 wins. He was inducted into the National Sprint Car Hall of Fame in 2011.

== Motorsports career results ==
=== NASCAR ===
(key) (Bold – Pole position awarded by qualifying time. Italics – Pole position earned by points standings or practice time. * – Most laps led.)

==== Winston Cup Series ====
NASCAR Winston Cup Series results
Year	Team	No.	Make	1	2	3	4	5	6	7	8	9	10	11	12	13	14	15	16	17	18	19	20	21	22	23	24	25	26	27	28	29	30	31	NWCC	Pts	Ref
1990	White Racing	64	Chevy	DAY	RCH	CAR	ATL	DAR	BRI	NWS	MAR	TAL	CLT	DOV	SON	POC	MCH	DAY	POC	TAL	GLN	MCH	BRI	DAR	RCH	DOV	MAR	NWS	CLT; DNQ	CAR	PHO	ATL			NA	0	
1991	White Racing	64	Chevy	DAY	RCH	CAR; DNQ	ATL	DAR	BRI	NWS	MAR	TAL	CLT	DOV	SON	POC	MCH	DAY	POC; 33	TAL	GLN	MCH	BRI	DAR	RCH	DOV	MAR	NWS	CLT	CAR	PHO	ATL			80th	64	
1994	White Racing	64	Chevy	DAY	CAR	RCH	ATL	DAR	BRI	NWS	MAR	TAL	SON	CLT	DOV	POC	MCH	DAY	NHA	POC	TAL	IND	GLN	MCH	BRI	DAR	RCH	DOV	MAR	NWS	CLT	CAR	PHO	ATL; DNQ	NA	0	

=== ASCS ===
As of 2008, Wright is the winningest driver in American Sprint Car Series history with 124 wins. Wright also recorded 4 straight series championships from 2003–2007.
