= 1991 Pontiac Excitement 400 =

Second race of the 1991 NASCAR Winston Cup Series

Race details
- Race 2 of 29 in the 1991 NASCAR Winston Cup Series
- The 1991 Pontiac Excitement 400 program cover, with artwork by NASCAR artist Sam Bass.
- Date: February 24, 1991
- Official name: 37th Annual Pontiac Excitement 400
- Location: Richmond, Virginia, Richmond International Raceway
- Course: Permanent racing facility
- Course length: 0.75 miles (1.21 km)
- Distance: 400 laps, 300 mi (482.803 km)
- Scheduled distance: 400 laps, 300 mi (482.803 km)
- Average speed: 105.937 miles per hour (170.489 km/h)
- Attendance: 51,000

Pole position
Driver	Davey Allison	Robert Yates Racing
- Time: 22.420

Most laps led
Driver	Ricky Rudd	Hendrick Motorsports
- Laps: 154

Winner
No. 3	Dale Earnhardt	Richard Childress Racing

Television in the United States
- Network: TBS
- Announcers: Ken Squier, Neil Bonnett, Ken Stabler

Radio in the United States
- Radio: Motor Racing Network

The 1991 Pontiac Excitement 400 was the second stock car race of the 1991 NASCAR Winston Cup Series and the 37th iteration of the event. The race was held on Sunday, February 24, 1991, before an audience of 51,000 in Richmond, Virginia, at Richmond International Raceway, a 0.75 miles (1.21 km) D-shaped oval. The race took the scheduled 400 laps to complete. Battling to the finish, Richard Childress Racing driver Dale Earnhardt would manage to defend against Hendrick Motorsports driver Ricky Rudd in the final laps of the race to take his 49th career NASCAR Winston Cup Series victory and his first victory of the season. To fill out the top three, the aforementioned Rudd and Leo Jackson Motorsports driver Harry Gant would finish second and third, respectively.

== Background ==
The layout of Richmond International Raceway, the venue where the race was at.

Richmond International Raceway (RIR) is a 3/4-mile (1.2 km), D-shaped, asphalt racetrack located just outside Richmond, Virginia in Henrico County. It hosts the Monster Energy NASCAR Cup Series and Xfinity Series. Known as "America's premier short track", it formerly hosted a NASCAR Camping World Truck Series race, an IndyCar Series race, and two USAC sprint car races.

=== Entry list ===
- (R) denotes rookie driver.

#	Driver	Team	Make
1	Rick Mast	Precision Products Racing	Oldsmobile
2	Rusty Wallace	Penske Racing South	Pontiac
3	Dale Earnhardt	Richard Childress Racing	Chevrolet
4	Ernie Irvan	Morgan–McClure Motorsports	Chevrolet
5	Ricky Rudd	Hendrick Motorsports	Chevrolet
6	Mark Martin	Roush Racing	Ford
7	Alan Kulwicki	AK Racing	Ford
8	Rick Wilson	Stavola Brothers Racing	Buick
9	Bill Elliott	Melling Racing	Ford
10	Derrike Cope	Whitcomb Racing	Chevrolet
11	Geoff Bodine	Junior Johnson & Associates	Ford
12	Hut Stricklin	Bobby Allison Motorsports	Buick
15	Morgan Shepherd	Bud Moore Engineering	Ford
17	Darrell Waltrip	Darrell Waltrip Motorsports	Chevrolet
19	Chad Little	Little Racing	Ford
20	Sammy Swindell*	Moroso Racing	Oldsmobile
21	Dale Jarrett	Wood Brothers Racing	Ford
22	Sterling Marlin	Junior Johnson & Associates	Ford
24	Mickey Gibbs	Team III Racing	Pontiac
25	Ken Schrader	Hendrick Motorsports	Chevrolet
26	Brett Bodine	King Racing	Buick
28	Davey Allison	Robert Yates Racing	Ford
30	Michael Waltrip	Bahari Racing	Pontiac
33	Harry Gant	Leo Jackson Motorsports	Oldsmobile
42	Kyle Petty	SABCO Racing	Pontiac
43	Richard Petty	Petty Enterprises	Pontiac
52	Jimmy Means	Jimmy Means Racing	Pontiac
55	Ted Musgrave (R)	U.S. Racing	Pontiac
66	Dick Trickle	Cale Yarborough Motorsports	Pontiac
68	Bobby Hamilton (R)	TriStar Motorsports	Oldsmobile
71	Dave Marcis	Marcis Auto Racing	Chevrolet
75	Joe Ruttman	RahMoc Enterprises	Oldsmobile
90	Robby Gordon	Donlavey Racing	Ford
94	Terry Labonte	Hagan Racing	Oldsmobile
98	Jimmy Spencer	Travis Carter Enterprises	Chevrolet

*Fired after first-round qualifying and replaced by Bobby Hillin Jr. for the race.

== Qualifying ==
Qualifying was split into two rounds. The first round was held on Friday, February 22, at 3:00 PM EST. Each driver would have one lap to set a time. During the first round, the top 20 drivers in the round would be guaranteed a starting spot in the race. If a driver was not able to guarantee a spot in the first round, they had the option to scrub their time from the first round and try and run a faster lap time in a second round qualifying run, held on Saturday, February 23, at 11:00 AM EST. As with the first round, each driver would have one lap to set a time. For this specific race, positions 21-34 would be decided on time, and depending on who needed it, a select amount of positions were given to cars who had not otherwise qualified but were high enough in owner's points; up to two were given. If needed, a past champion who did not qualify on either time or provisionals could use a champion's provisional, adding one more spot to the field.

Davey Allison, driving for Robert Yates Racing, would win the pole, setting a time of 22.420 and an average speed of 120.428 miles per hour (193.810 km/h) in the first round.

No drivers would fail to qualify.

=== Full qualifying results ===
Pos.	#	Driver	Team	Make	Time	Speed
1	28	Davey Allison	Robert Yates Racing	Ford	22.420	120.428
2	7	Alan Kulwicki	AK Racing	Ford	22.425	120.401
3	26	Brett Bodine	King Racing	Buick	22.491	120.048
4	5	Ricky Rudd	Hendrick Motorsports	Chevrolet	22.521	119.888
5	25	Ken Schrader	Hendrick Motorsports	Chevrolet	22.540	119.787
6	33	Harry Gant	Leo Jackson Motorsports	Oldsmobile	22.545	119.760
7	11	Geoff Bodine	Junior Johnson & Associates	Ford	22.549	119.739
8	4	Ernie Irvan	Morgan–McClure Motorsports	Chevrolet	22.595	119.495
9	42	Kyle Petty	SABCO Racing	Pontiac	22.613	119.400
10	66	Dick Trickle	Cale Yarborough Motorsports	Pontiac	22.631	119.305
11	22	Sterling Marlin	Junior Johnson & Associates	Ford	22.680	119.048
12	10	Derrike Cope	Whitcomb Racing	Chevrolet	22.681	119.042
13	21	Dale Jarrett	Wood Brothers Racing	Ford	22.715	118.864
14	6	Mark Martin	Roush Racing	Ford	22.733	118.770
15	30	Michael Waltrip	Bahari Racing	Pontiac	22.746	118.702
16	1	Rick Mast	Precision Products Racing	Oldsmobile	22.783	118.509
17	17	Darrell Waltrip	Darrell Waltrip Motorsports	Chevrolet	22.823	118.302
18	94	Terry Labonte	Hagan Racing	Oldsmobile	22.844	118.193
19	3	Dale Earnhardt	Richard Childress Racing	Chevrolet	22.851	118.157
20	2	Rusty Wallace	Penske Racing South	Pontiac	22.854	118.141
Failed to lock in Round 1
21	15	Morgan Shepherd	Bud Moore Engineering	Ford	22.563	119.665
22	8	Rick Wilson	Stavola Brothers Racing	Buick	22.770	118.577
23	43	Richard Petty	Petty Enterprises	Pontiac	22.812	118.359
24	9	Bill Elliott	Melling Racing	Ford	22.872	118.048
25	24	Mickey Gibbs	Team III Racing	Pontiac	22.901	117.899
26	12	Hut Stricklin	Bobby Allison Motorsports	Buick	22.931	117.745
27	75	Joe Ruttman	RahMoc Enterprises	Oldsmobile	22.941	117.693
28	20	Bobby Hillin Jr.	Moroso Racing	Oldsmobile	22.947	117.662
29	19	Chad Little	Little Racing	Ford	22.958	117.606
30	98	Jimmy Spencer	Travis Carter Enterprises	Chevrolet	22.980	117.493
31	52	Jimmy Means	Jimmy Means Racing	Pontiac	22.984	117.473
32	68	Bobby Hamilton (R)	TriStar Motorsports	Oldsmobile	23.006	117.361
33	55	Ted Musgrave (R)	U.S. Racing	Pontiac	23.037	117.203
34	71	Dave Marcis	Marcis Auto Racing	Chevrolet	23.039	117.193
Provisional
35	90	Robby Gordon	Donlavey Racing	Ford	-*	-*
Official first round qualifying results
Official starting lineup

== Race results ==
Fin	St	#	Driver	Team	Make	Laps	Led	Status	Pts	Winnings
1	19	3	Dale Earnhardt	Richard Childress Racing	Chevrolet	400	150	running	180	$67,950
2	4	5	Ricky Rudd	Hendrick Motorsports	Chevrolet	400	154	running	180	$45,675
3	6	33	Harry Gant	Leo Jackson Motorsports	Oldsmobile	400	3	running	170	$25,500
4	20	2	Rusty Wallace	Penske Racing South	Pontiac	400	3	running	165	$13,050
5	2	7	Alan Kulwicki	AK Racing	Ford	400	48	running	160	$19,025
6	14	6	Mark Martin	Roush Racing	Ford	400	0	running	150	$15,450
7	17	17	Darrell Waltrip	Darrell Waltrip Motorsports	Chevrolet	400	4	running	151	$5,650
8	21	15	Morgan Shepherd	Bud Moore Engineering	Ford	399	0	running	142	$11,550
9	11	22	Sterling Marlin	Junior Johnson & Associates	Ford	398	0	running	138	$5,150
10	5	25	Ken Schrader	Hendrick Motorsports	Chevrolet	398	0	running	134	$11,700
11	23	43	Richard Petty	Petty Enterprises	Pontiac	398	0	running	130	$7,750
12	1	28	Davey Allison	Robert Yates Racing	Ford	398	38	running	132	$15,350
13	7	11	Geoff Bodine	Junior Johnson & Associates	Ford	397	0	running	124	$11,500
14	18	94	Terry Labonte	Hagan Racing	Oldsmobile	397	0	running	121	$7,200
15	10	66	Dick Trickle	Cale Yarborough Motorsports	Pontiac	396	0	running	118	$7,660
16	29	19	Chad Little	Little Racing	Ford	395	0	running	115	$5,225
17	15	30	Michael Waltrip	Bahari Racing	Pontiac	394	0	running	112	$6,525
18	22	8	Rick Wilson	Stavola Brothers Racing	Buick	394	0	running	109	$6,375
19	33	55	Ted Musgrave (R)	U.S. Racing	Pontiac	393	0	running	106	$5,500
20	28	20	Bobby Hillin Jr.	Moroso Racing	Oldsmobile	392	0	running	103	$5,525
21	13	21	Dale Jarrett	Wood Brothers Racing	Ford	392	0	running	100	$5,825
22	26	12	Hut Stricklin	Bobby Allison Motorsports	Buick	391	0	crash	97	$5,750
23	25	24	Mickey Gibbs	Team III Racing	Pontiac	391	0	running	94	$3,375
24	3	26	Brett Bodine	King Racing	Buick	390	0	crash	91	$6,575
25	9	42	Kyle Petty	SABCO Racing	Pontiac	390	0	running	88	$5,475
26	35	90	Robby Gordon	Donlavey Racing	Ford	388	0	running	85	$3,525
27	8	4	Ernie Irvan	Morgan–McClure Motorsports	Chevrolet	379	0	running	82	$8,950
28	32	68	Bobby Hamilton (R)	TriStar Motorsports	Oldsmobile	372	0	running	79	$3,225
29	27	75	Joe Ruttman	RahMoc Enterprises	Oldsmobile	367	0	running	76	$6,250
30	24	9	Bill Elliott	Melling Racing	Ford	365	0	running	73	$9,870
31	31	52	Jimmy Means	Jimmy Means Racing	Pontiac	356	0	engine	70	$3,750
32	12	10	Derrike Cope	Whitcomb Racing	Chevrolet	309	0	running	67	$10,225
33	34	71	Dave Marcis	Marcis Auto Racing	Chevrolet	256	0	axle	64	$4,610
34	30	98	Jimmy Spencer	Travis Carter Enterprises	Chevrolet	236	0	steering	61	$4,600
35	16	1	Rick Mast	Precision Products Racing	Oldsmobile	221	0	running	58	$4,600
Official race results

== Standings after the race ==
Drivers' Championship standings

	Pos	Driver	Points
4	1	Dale Earnhardt	340
7	2	Ricky Rudd	318 (-22)
1	3	Sterling Marlin	313 (-27)
4	4	Alan Kulwicki	302 (–38)
4	5	Ernie Irvan	262 (–78)
19	6	Harry Gant	258 (–82)
8	7	Davey Allison	255 (–85)
18	8	Rusty Wallace	252 (–88)
3	9	Dale Jarrett	250 (–90)
11	10	Mark Martin	250 (–90)
Official driver's standings

- Note: Only the first 10 positions are included for the driver standings.

Previous race: 1991 Daytona 500	NASCAR Winston Cup Series; 1991 season	Next race: 1991 GM Goodwrench 500
