= 1992 Pontiac Excitement 400 =

Third race of the 1992 NASCAR Winston Cup Series

Race details
- Race 3 of 29 in the 1992 NASCAR Winston Cup Series
- The 1992 Pontiac Excitement 400 program cover, with artwork by NASCAR artist Sam Bass.
- Date: March 8, 1992
- Official name: 38th Annual Pontiac Excitement 400
- Location: Richmond, Virginia, Richmond International Raceway
- Course: Permanent racing facility
- Course length: 0.75 miles (1.21 km)
- Distance: 400 laps, 300 mi (482.803 km)
- Scheduled distance: 400 laps, 300 mi (482.803 km)
- Average speed: 104.378 miles per hour (167.980 km/h)
- Attendance: 65,200

Pole position
Driver	Bill Elliott	Junior Johnson & Associates
- Time: 22.252

Most laps led
Driver	Bill Elliott	Junior Johnson & Associates
- Laps: 348

Winner
No. 11	Bill Elliott	Junior Johnson & Associates

Television in the United States
- Network: TBS
- Announcers: Ken Squier, Neil Bonnett

Radio in the United States
- Radio: Motor Racing Network

The 1992 Pontiac Excitement 400 was the third stock car race of the 1992 NASCAR Winston Cup Series season and the 38th iteration of the event. The race was held on Sunday, March 8, 1992, before an audience of 65,200 in Richmond, Virginia, at Richmond International Raceway, a 0.75 miles (1.21 km) D-shaped oval. The race took the scheduled 400 laps to complete. In a close finish, Junior Johnson & Associates driver Bill Elliott would manage to complete a dominant performance by besting challenger Alan Kulwicki by 18 inches (46 cm) at the finish line to take his 36th career NASCAR Winston Cup Series victory and his second victory of the season. To fill out the top three, Leo Jackson Motorsports driver Harry Gant would finish third.

== Background ==
The layout of Richmond International Raceway, the venue where the race was at.

Richmond International Raceway (RIR) is a 3/4 mile (1.2 km) D-shaped, asphalt racetrack located just outside Richmond, Virginia, in Henrico County. It is known as "America's premier short track."

=== Entry list ===
- (R) denotes rookie driver.

#	Driver	Team	Make
1	Rick Mast	Precision Products Racing	Oldsmobile
2	Rusty Wallace	Penske Racing South	Pontiac
3	Dale Earnhardt	Richard Childress Racing	Chevrolet
4	Ernie Irvan	Morgan–McClure Motorsports	Chevrolet
5	Ricky Rudd	Hendrick Motorsports	Chevrolet
6	Mark Martin	Roush Racing	Ford
7	Alan Kulwicki	AK Racing	Ford
8	Dick Trickle	Stavola Brothers Racing	Ford
10	Derrike Cope	Whitcomb Racing	Chevrolet
11	Bill Elliott	Junior Johnson & Associates	Ford
12	Hut Stricklin	Bobby Allison Motorsports	Chevrolet
15	Geoff Bodine	Bud Moore Engineering	Ford
16	Wally Dallenbach Jr.	Roush Racing	Ford
17	Darrell Waltrip	Darrell Waltrip Motorsports	Chevrolet
18	Dale Jarrett	Joe Gibbs Racing	Chevrolet
21	Morgan Shepherd	Wood Brothers Racing	Ford
22	Sterling Marlin	Junior Johnson & Associates	Ford
25	Ken Schrader	Hendrick Motorsports	Chevrolet
26	Brett Bodine	King Racing	Ford
28	Davey Allison	Robert Yates Racing	Ford
30	Michael Waltrip	Bahari Racing	Pontiac
32	Randy Porter	Porter Racing	Pontiac
33	Harry Gant	Leo Jackson Motorsports	Oldsmobile
41	Greg Sacks	Larry Hedrick Motorsports	Chevrolet
42	Kyle Petty	SABCO Racing	Pontiac
43	Richard Petty	Petty Enterprises	Pontiac
49	Stanley Smith	BS&S Motorsports	Chevrolet
52	Jimmy Means	Jimmy Means Racing	Pontiac
55	Ted Musgrave	RaDiUs Motorsports	Oldsmobile
59	Andy Belmont (R)	Pat Rissi Racing	Ford
66	Chad Little	Cale Yarborough Motorsports	Ford
68	Bobby Hamilton	TriStar Motorsports	Oldsmobile
71	Dave Marcis	Marcis Auto Racing	Chevrolet
88	Jeff Fuller	Bandzul Racing	Pontiac
90	Charlie Glotzbach	Donlavey Racing	Ford
94	Terry Labonte	Hagan Racing	Oldsmobile
98	Jimmy Spencer	Travis Carter Enterprises	Chevrolet

== Qualifying ==
Qualifying was originally scheduled to be split into two rounds. The first round was held on Friday, March 6, at 2:30 PM EST. Originally, the first 20 positions were going to be determined by first round qualifying, with positions 21-40 meant to be determined the following day on Saturday, March 7. However, due to rain, the second round was cancelled. As a result, the rest of the starting lineup was set using the results from the first round.

Bill Elliott, driving for Junior Johnson & Associates, would win the pole, setting a time of 22.252 and an average speed of 121.337 miles per hour (195.273 km/h).

Two drivers would fail to qualify.

=== Full qualifying results ===
Pos.	#	Driver	Team	Make	Time	Speed
1	11	Bill Elliott	Junior Johnson & Associates	Ford	22.252	121.337
2	28	Davey Allison	Robert Yates Racing	Ford	22.394	120.568
3	42	Kyle Petty	SABCO Racing	Pontiac	22.463	120.198
4	22	Sterling Marlin	Junior Johnson & Associates	Ford	22.473	120.144
5	7	Alan Kulwicki	AK Racing	Ford	22.476	120.128
6	33	Harry Gant	Leo Jackson Motorsports	Oldsmobile	22.502	119.989
7	30	Michael Waltrip	Bahari Racing	Pontiac	22.530	119.840
8	12	Hut Stricklin	Bobby Allison Motorsports	Chevrolet	22.547	119.750
9	26	Brett Bodine	King Racing	Ford	22.548	119.745
10	4	Ernie Irvan	Morgan–McClure Motorsports	Chevrolet	22.551	119.729
11	21	Morgan Shepherd	Wood Brothers Racing	Ford	22.567	119.644
12	2	Rusty Wallace	Penske Racing South	Pontiac	22.568	119.638
13	25	Ken Schrader	Hendrick Motorsports	Chevrolet	22.573	119.612
14	15	Geoff Bodine	Bud Moore Engineering	Ford	22.592	119.511
15	6	Mark Martin	Roush Racing	Ford	22.602	119.458
16	98	Jimmy Spencer	Travis Carter Enterprises	Chevrolet	22.640	119.258
17	1	Rick Mast	Precision Products Racing	Oldsmobile	22.649	119.211
18	17	Darrell Waltrip	Darrell Waltrip Motorsports	Chevrolet	22.668	119.111
19	94	Terry Labonte	Hagan Racing	Oldsmobile	22.709	118.896
20	41	Greg Sacks	Larry Hedrick Motorsports	Chevrolet	22.710	118.890
21	18	Dale Jarrett	Joe Gibbs Racing	Chevrolet	22.758	118.640
22	8	Dick Trickle	Stavola Brothers Racing	Ford	22.793	118.457
23	66	Chad Little	Cale Yarborough Motorsports	Ford	22.816	118.338
24	68	Bobby Hamilton	TriStar Motorsports	Oldsmobile	22.829	118.271
25	43	Richard Petty	Petty Enterprises	Pontiac	22.842	118.203
26	10	Derrike Cope	Whitcomb Racing	Chevrolet	22.854	118.141
27	5	Ricky Rudd	Hendrick Motorsports	Chevrolet	22.861	118.105
28	71	Dave Marcis	Marcis Auto Racing	Chevrolet	22.890	117.955
29	3	Dale Earnhardt	Richard Childress Racing	Chevrolet	22.954	117.627
30	88	Jeff Fuller	Bandzul Racing	Pontiac	23.082	116.974
31	16	Wally Dallenbach Jr.	Roush Racing	Ford	23.103	116.868
32	55	Ted Musgrave	RaDiUs Motorsports	Oldsmobile	23.129	116.737
33	52	Jimmy Means	Jimmy Means Racing	Pontiac	23.158	116.590
34	49	Stanley Smith	BS&S Motorsports	Chevrolet	23.361	115.577
Provisional
35	90	Charlie Glotzbach	Donlavey Racing	Ford	23.373	115.518
Failed to qualify
36	59	Andy Belmont (R)	Pat Rissi Racing	Ford	24.372	110.783
37	32	Randy Porter	Porter Racing	Pontiac	-	-
Official first round qualifying results
Official starting lineup

== Race results ==
Fin	St	#	Driver	Team	Make	Laps	Led	Status	Pts	Winnings
1	1	11	Bill Elliott	Junior Johnson & Associates	Ford	400	348	running	185	$272,700
2	5	7	Alan Kulwicki	AK Racing	Ford	400	0	running	170	$36,525
3	6	33	Harry Gant	Leo Jackson Motorsports	Oldsmobile	400	48	running	170	$31,950
4	2	28	Davey Allison	Robert Yates Racing	Ford	400	1	running	165	$25,100
5	18	17	Darrell Waltrip	Darrell Waltrip Motorsports	Chevrolet	400	3	running	160	$21,775
6	27	5	Ricky Rudd	Hendrick Motorsports	Chevrolet	400	0	running	150	$16,050
7	4	22	Sterling Marlin	Junior Johnson & Associates	Ford	399	0	running	146	$13,700
8	19	94	Terry Labonte	Hagan Racing	Oldsmobile	399	0	running	142	$12,250
9	8	12	Hut Stricklin	Bobby Allison Motorsports	Chevrolet	399	0	running	138	$11,950
10	11	21	Morgan Shepherd	Wood Brothers Racing	Ford	399	0	running	134	$13,600
11	29	3	Dale Earnhardt	Richard Childress Racing	Chevrolet	399	0	running	130	$16,600
12	16	98	Jimmy Spencer	Travis Carter Enterprises	Chevrolet	398	0	running	127	$10,650
13	21	18	Dale Jarrett	Joe Gibbs Racing	Chevrolet	398	0	running	124	$4,800
14	13	25	Ken Schrader	Hendrick Motorsports	Chevrolet	397	0	running	121	$13,700
15	10	4	Ernie Irvan	Morgan–McClure Motorsports	Chevrolet	397	0	running	118	$14,360
16	14	15	Geoff Bodine	Bud Moore Engineering	Ford	397	0	running	115	$12,225
17	12	2	Rusty Wallace	Penske Racing South	Pontiac	396	0	running	112	$12,425
18	17	1	Rick Mast	Precision Products Racing	Oldsmobile	396	0	running	109	$9,875
19	26	10	Derrike Cope	Whitcomb Racing	Chevrolet	396	0	running	106	$5,550
20	3	42	Kyle Petty	SABCO Racing	Pontiac	395	0	running	103	$9,325
21	25	43	Richard Petty	Petty Enterprises	Pontiac	395	0	running	100	$9,875
22	22	8	Dick Trickle	Stavola Brothers Racing	Ford	394	0	running	97	$9,100
23	23	66	Chad Little	Cale Yarborough Motorsports	Ford	393	0	running	94	$5,925
24	31	16	Wally Dallenbach Jr.	Roush Racing	Ford	393	0	running	91	$4,150
25	32	55	Ted Musgrave	RaDiUs Motorsports	Oldsmobile	393	0	running	88	$8,750
26	35	90	Charlie Glotzbach	Donlavey Racing	Ford	392	0	running	85	$5,675
27	34	49	Stanley Smith	BS&S Motorsports	Chevrolet	392	0	running	82	$4,050
28	28	71	Dave Marcis	Marcis Auto Racing	Chevrolet	389	0	running	79	$5,600
29	30	88	Jeff Fuller	Bandzul Racing	Pontiac	386	0	water pump	76	$4,000
30	15	6	Mark Martin	Roush Racing	Ford	363	0	running	73	$11,970
31	24	68	Bobby Hamilton	TriStar Motorsports	Oldsmobile	353	0	rear end	70	$9,500
32	20	41	Greg Sacks	Larry Hedrick Motorsports	Chevrolet	342	0	running	67	$3,925
33	9	26	Brett Bodine	King Racing	Ford	267	0	axle	64	$9,435
34	7	30	Michael Waltrip	Bahari Racing	Pontiac	259	0	engine	61	$8,400
35	33	52	Jimmy Means	Jimmy Means Racing	Pontiac	93	0	engine	58	$4,400
Failed to qualify
36		59	Andy Belmont (R)	Pat Rissi Racing	Ford					
37		32	Randy Porter	Porter Racing	Pontiac					
Official race results

== Standings after the race ==
Drivers' Championship standings

	Pos	Driver	Points
	1	Davey Allison	525
1	2	Harry Gant	462 (-63)
3	3	Bill Elliott	457 (-68)
2	4	Morgan Shepherd	438 (–87)
1	5	Terry Labonte	434 (–91)
1	6	Geoff Bodine	401 (–124)
4	7	Alan Kulwicki	400 (–125)
8	8	Darrell Waltrip	384 (–141)
4	9	Hut Stricklin	367 (–158)
1	10	Rick Mast	360 (–165)
Official driver's standings

- Note: Only the first 10 positions are included for the driver standings.

Previous race: 1992 GM Goodwrench 500	NASCAR Winston Cup Series; 1992 season	Next race: 1992 Motorcraft Quality Parts 500
