= 1992 First Union 400 =

Seventh race of the 1992 NASCAR Winston Cup Series

Race details
- Race 7 of 29 in the 1992 NASCAR Winston Cup Series
- The 1992 First Union 400 program cover, featuring Darrell Waltrip.
- Date: April 26, 1992
- Official name: 42nd Annual First Union 400
- Location: North Wilkesboro Speedway, North Wilkesboro, North Carolina
- Course: Permanent racing facility
- Course length: 0.625 miles (1.006 km)
- Distance: 400 laps, 250 mi (402.336 km)
- Scheduled distance: 400 laps, 250 mi (402.336 km)
- Average speed: 90.653 miles per hour (145.892 km/h)
- Attendance: 44,000

Pole position
Driver	Alan Kulwicki	AK Racing
- Time: 19.191

Most laps led
Driver	Alan Kulwicki	AK Racing
- Laps: 219

Winner
No. 28	Davey Allison	Robert Yates Racing

Television in the United States
- Network: ESPN
- Announcers: Bob Jenkins, Ned Jarrett, Benny Parsons

Radio in the United States
- Radio: Motor Racing Network

The 1992 First Union 400 was the seventh stock car race of the 1992 NASCAR Winston Cup Series season and the 42nd iteration of the event. The race was held on Sunday, April 4, 1992, before an audience of 44,000 in North Wilkesboro, North Carolina at the North Wilkesboro Speedway, a 0.625 miles (1.006 km) oval short track. The race took the scheduled 400 laps to complete. At race's end, Robert Yates Racing driver Davey Allison would manage to defend the field in the last 88 laps to take his 15th career NASCAR Winston Cup Series victory and his second victory of the season. With the victory, Allison was able to grow his driver's championship points lead to 86 points. To fill out the top three, Penske Racing South driver Rusty Wallace and Hendrick Motorsports driver Ricky Rudd would finish second and third, respectively.

== Background ==
The layout of North Wilkesboro Speedway, the venue where the race was held.

North Wilkesboro Speedway is a short oval racetrack located on U.S. Route 421, about five miles east of the town of North Wilkesboro, North Carolina, or 80 miles north of Charlotte. It measures 0.625 mi (1.006 km) and features a unique uphill backstretch and downhill frontstretch. It has previously held races in NASCAR's top three series, including 93 Winston Cup Series races. The track, a NASCAR original, operated from 1949, NASCAR's inception, until the track's original closure in 1996. The speedway briefly reopened in 2010 and hosted several stock car series races before closing again in the spring of 2011. It was re-opened in August 2022 for grassroots racing.

=== Entry list ===
- (R) denotes rookie driver.

#	Driver	Team	Make
1	Rick Mast	Precision Products Racing	Oldsmobile
2	Rusty Wallace	Penske Racing South	Pontiac
3	Dale Earnhardt	Richard Childress Racing	Chevrolet
4	Ernie Irvan	Morgan–McClure Motorsports	Chevrolet
5	Ricky Rudd	Hendrick Motorsports	Chevrolet
6	Mark Martin	Roush Racing	Ford
7	Alan Kulwicki	AK Racing	Ford
8	Dick Trickle	Stavola Brothers Racing	Ford
10	Derrike Cope	Whitcomb Racing	Chevrolet
11	Bill Elliott	Junior Johnson & Associates	Ford
12	Hut Stricklin	Bobby Allison Motorsports	Chevrolet
15	Geoff Bodine	Bud Moore Engineering	Ford
16	Wally Dallenbach Jr.	Roush Racing	Ford
17	Darrell Waltrip	Darrell Waltrip Motorsports	Chevrolet
18	Dale Jarrett	Joe Gibbs Racing	Chevrolet
21	Morgan Shepherd	Wood Brothers Racing	Ford
22	Sterling Marlin	Junior Johnson & Associates	Ford
25	Ken Schrader	Hendrick Motorsports	Chevrolet
26	Brett Bodine	King Racing	Ford
28	Davey Allison*	Robert Yates Racing	Ford
30	Michael Waltrip	Bahari Racing	Pontiac
33	Harry Gant	Leo Jackson Motorsports	Oldsmobile
41	Greg Sacks	Larry Hedrick Motorsports	Chevrolet
42	Kyle Petty	SABCO Racing	Pontiac
43	Richard Petty	Petty Enterprises	Pontiac
52	Jimmy Means	Jimmy Means Racing	Pontiac
55	Ted Musgrave	RaDiUs Motorsports	Oldsmobile
66	Bobby Hillin Jr.	Cale Yarborough Motorsports	Ford
68	Bobby Hamilton	TriStar Motorsports	Oldsmobile
71	Dave Marcis	Marcis Auto Racing	Chevrolet
94	Terry Labonte	Hagan Racing	Oldsmobile
98	Jimmy Spencer	Travis Carter Enterprises	Chevrolet

*Replaced by Jimmy Hensley in qualifying due to injuries. Allison would, however, race in the event.

== Qualifying ==
Qualifying was split into two rounds. The first round was held on Friday, April 10, at 3:00 PM EST. Each driver would have one lap to set a time. During the first round, the top 15 drivers in the round would be guaranteed a starting spot in the race. If a driver was not able to guarantee a spot in the first round, they had the option to scrub their time from the first round and try and run a faster lap time in a second round qualifying run, held on Saturday, April 11, at 12:15 PM EST. As with the first round, each driver would have one lap to set a time. For this specific race, positions 16-30 would be decided on time, and depending on who needed it, a select amount of positions were given to cars who had not otherwise qualified but were high enough in owner's points; up to two were given. If needed, a past champion who did not qualify on either time or provisionals could use a champion's provisional, adding one more spot to the field.

Alan Kulwicki, driving for his own AK Racing team, won the pole, setting a time of 19.191 and an average speed of 117.242 mph (188.683 km/h) in the first round.

No drivers would fail to qualify.

=== Full qualifying results ===
Pos.	#	Driver	Team	Make	Time	Speed
1	7	Alan Kulwicki	AK Racing	Ford	19.191	117.242
2	5	Ricky Rudd	Hendrick Motorsports	Chevrolet	19.275	116.732
3	94	Terry Labonte	Hagan Racing	Oldsmobile	19.279	116.707
4	4	Ernie Irvan	Morgan–McClure Motorsports	Chevrolet	19.290	116.641
5	2	Rusty Wallace	Penske Racing South	Pontiac	19.302	116.568
6	8	Dick Trickle	Stavola Brothers Racing	Ford	19.303	116.562
7	28	Jimmy Hensley (R)	Robert Yates Racing	Ford	19.321	116.454
8	26	Brett Bodine	King Racing	Ford	19.323	116.442
9	3	Dale Earnhardt	Richard Childress Racing	Chevrolet	19.359	116.225
10	22	Sterling Marlin	Junior Johnson & Associates	Ford	19.367	116.177
11	15	Geoff Bodine	Bud Moore Engineering	Ford	19.397	115.997
12	6	Mark Martin	Roush Racing	Ford	19.406	115.944
13	55	Ted Musgrave	RaDiUs Motorsports	Oldsmobile	19.423	115.842
14	21	Morgan Shepherd	Wood Brothers Racing	Ford	19.432	115.788
15	42	Kyle Petty	SABCO Racing	Pontiac	19.454	115.657
Failed to lock in Round 1
16	33	Harry Gant	Leo Jackson Motorsports	Oldsmobile	19.461	115.616
17	30	Michael Waltrip	Bahari Racing	Pontiac	19.461	115.616
18	25	Ken Schrader	Hendrick Motorsports	Chevrolet	19.463	115.604
19	41	Greg Sacks	Larry Hedrick Motorsports	Chevrolet	19.468	115.574
20	11	Bill Elliott	Junior Johnson & Associates	Ford	19.494	115.420
21	98	Jimmy Spencer	Travis Carter Enterprises	Chevrolet	19.513	115.308
22	10	Derrike Cope	Whitcomb Racing	Chevrolet	19.546	115.113
23	68	Bobby Hamilton	TriStar Motorsports	Oldsmobile	19.546	115.113
24	18	Dale Jarrett	Joe Gibbs Racing	Chevrolet	19.552	115.078
25	17	Darrell Waltrip	Darrell Waltrip Motorsports	Chevrolet	19.576	114.937
26	71	Dave Marcis	Marcis Auto Racing	Chevrolet	19.647	114.521
27	1	Rick Mast	Precision Products Racing	Oldsmobile	19.692	114.260
28	43	Richard Petty	Petty Enterprises	Pontiac	19.695	114.242
29	12	Hut Stricklin	Bobby Allison Motorsports	Chevrolet	19.698	114.225
30	52	Jimmy Means	Jimmy Means Racing	Pontiac	19.772	113.797
Provisionals
31	16	Wally Dallenbach Jr.	Roush Racing	Ford	-*	-*
32	66	Bobby Hillin Jr.	Cale Yarborough Motorsports	Ford	-*	-*
Official first round qualifying results
Official starting lineup

== Race results ==
Fin	St	#	Driver	Team	Make	Laps	Led	Status	Pts	Winnings
1	7	28	Davey Allison	Robert Yates Racing	Ford	400	88	running	180	$51,740
2	5	2	Rusty Wallace	Penske Racing South	Pontiac	400	47	running	175	$29,140
3	2	5	Ricky Rudd	Hendrick Motorsports	Chevrolet	400	0	running	165	$23,465
4	11	15	Geoff Bodine	Bud Moore Engineering	Ford	400	28	running	165	$22,665
5	16	33	Harry Gant	Leo Jackson Motorsports	Oldsmobile	400	0	running	155	$19,590
6	9	3	Dale Earnhardt	Richard Childress Racing	Chevrolet	400	36	running	155	$32,540
7	1	7	Alan Kulwicki	AK Racing	Ford	400	182	running	156	$21,990
8	10	22	Sterling Marlin	Junior Johnson & Associates	Ford	400	0	running	142	$11,835
9	3	94	Terry Labonte	Hagan Racing	Oldsmobile	400	0	running	138	$11,085
10	8	26	Brett Bodine	King Racing	Ford	400	19	running	139	$12,965
11	6	8	Dick Trickle	Stavola Brothers Racing	Ford	400	0	running	130	$10,610
12	14	21	Morgan Shepherd	Wood Brothers Racing	Ford	400	0	running	127	$10,260
13	4	4	Ernie Irvan	Morgan–McClure Motorsports	Chevrolet	400	0	running	124	$13,935
14	22	10	Derrike Cope	Whitcomb Racing	Chevrolet	399	0	running	121	$6,860
15	25	17	Darrell Waltrip	Darrell Waltrip Motorsports	Chevrolet	399	0	running	118	$13,735
16	12	6	Mark Martin	Roush Racing	Ford	399	0	running	115	$11,960
17	24	18	Dale Jarrett	Joe Gibbs Racing	Chevrolet	399	0	running	112	$3,885
18	29	12	Hut Stricklin	Bobby Allison Motorsports	Chevrolet	399	0	running	109	$9,835
19	13	55	Ted Musgrave	RaDiUs Motorsports	Oldsmobile	398	0	running	106	$9,010
20	20	11	Bill Elliott	Junior Johnson & Associates	Ford	398	0	running	103	$12,410
21	19	41	Greg Sacks	Larry Hedrick Motorsports	Chevrolet	397	0	running	100	$3,660
22	18	25	Ken Schrader	Hendrick Motorsports	Chevrolet	397	0	running	97	$12,610
23	27	1	Rick Mast	Precision Products Racing	Oldsmobile	396	0	running	94	$8,460
24	26	71	Dave Marcis	Marcis Auto Racing	Chevrolet	396	0	running	91	$5,310
25	32	66	Bobby Hillin Jr.	Cale Yarborough Motorsports	Ford	393	0	running	88	$5,260
26	21	98	Jimmy Spencer	Travis Carter Enterprises	Chevrolet	393	0	running	85	$8,060
27	23	68	Bobby Hamilton	TriStar Motorsports	Oldsmobile	393	0	running	82	$8,885
28	15	42	Kyle Petty	SABCO Racing	Pontiac	367	0	running	79	$7,770
29	17	30	Michael Waltrip	Bahari Racing	Pontiac	347	0	running	76	$9,735
30	31	16	Wally Dallenbach Jr.	Roush Racing	Ford	346	0	running	73	$3,060
31	28	43	Richard Petty	Petty Enterprises	Pontiac	234	0	handling	70	$8,610
32	30	52	Jimmy Means	Jimmy Means Racing	Pontiac	219	0	engine	67	$4,535
Official race results

== Standings after the race ==
Drivers' Championship standings

	Pos	Driver	Points
	1	Davey Allison	1,129
1	2	Harry Gant	1,043 (-86)
1	3	Bill Elliott	1,023 (-106)
	4	Terry Labonte	1,013 (–116)
	5	Alan Kulwicki	1,006 (–123)
1	6	Geoff Bodine	985 (–144)
1	7	Morgan Shepherd	969 (–160)
	8	Dale Earnhardt	927 (–202)
	9	Dick Trickle	893 (–236)
1	10	Ricky Rudd	869 (–260)
Official driver's standings

- Note: Only the first 10 positions are included for the driver standings.

Previous race: 1992 Food City 500	NASCAR Winston Cup Series; 1992 season	Next race: 1992 Hanes 500
