= 1992 Hanes 500 =

Eighth race of the 1992 NASCAR Winston Cup Series

Race details
- Race 8 of 29 in the 1992 NASCAR Winston Cup Series
- The 1992 Hanes 500 program cover, featuring Dale Earnhardt and his pit crew.
- Date: April 26, 1992
- Official name: 43rd Annual Hanes 500
- Location: Martinsville, Virginia, Martinsville Speedway
- Course: Permanent racing facility
- Course length: 0.526 miles (0.847 km)
- Distance: 500 laps, 263 mi (423.257 km)
- Scheduled distance: 500 laps, 263 mi (423.257 km)
- Average speed: 78.086 miles per hour (125.667 km/h)
- Attendance: 48,300

Pole position
Driver	Darrell Waltrip	Darrell Waltrip Motorsports
- Time: 20.371

Most laps led
Driver	Alan Kulwicki	AK Racing
- Laps: 219

Winner
No. 6	Mark Martin	Roush Racing

Television in the United States
- Network: ESPN
- Announcers: Bob Jenkins, Ned Jarrett, Benny Parsons

Radio in the United States
- Radio: Motor Racing Network

The 1992 Hanes 500 was the eighth stock car race of the 1992 NASCAR Winston Cup Series season and the 43rd iteration of the event. The race was held on Sunday, April 26, 1992, before an audience of 48,300 in Martinsville, Virginia at Martinsville Speedway, a 0.526 miles (0.847 km) permanent oval-shaped short track. The race took the scheduled 500 laps to complete. In a race marred with rear axle failures, Roush Racing driver Mark Martin would manage to keep his car intact and hold off the field on the final restart with four to go to take his sixth career NASCAR Winston Cup Series victory and his first victory of the season. To fill out the top three, Junior Johnson & Associates driver Sterling Marlin and owner-driver Darrell Waltrip would finish second and third, respectively.

== Background ==
The layout of Martinsville Speedway, the venue where the race was held.

Martinsville Speedway is a NASCAR-owned stock car racing track located in Henry County, in Ridgeway, Virginia, just to the south of Martinsville. At 0.526 miles (0.847 km) in length, it is the shortest track in the NASCAR Cup Series. The track was also one of the first paved oval tracks in NASCAR, being built in 1947 by H. Clay Earles. It is also the only remaining race track that has been on the NASCAR circuit from its beginning in 1948.

=== Entry list ===
- (R) denotes rookie driver.

#	Driver	Team	Make
1	Rick Mast	Precision Products Racing	Oldsmobile
2	Rusty Wallace	Penske Racing South	Pontiac
3	Dale Earnhardt	Richard Childress Racing	Chevrolet
4	Ernie Irvan	Morgan–McClure Motorsports	Chevrolet
5	Ricky Rudd	Hendrick Motorsports	Chevrolet
6	Mark Martin	Roush Racing	Ford
7	Alan Kulwicki	AK Racing	Ford
8	Dick Trickle	Stavola Brothers Racing	Ford
9	Dave Mader III	Melling Racing	Ford
10	Derrike Cope	Whitcomb Racing	Chevrolet
11	Bill Elliott	Junior Johnson & Associates	Ford
12	Hut Stricklin	Bobby Allison Motorsports	Chevrolet
15	Geoff Bodine	Bud Moore Engineering	Ford
16	Wally Dallenbach Jr.	Roush Racing	Ford
17	Darrell Waltrip	Darrell Waltrip Motorsports	Chevrolet
18	Dale Jarrett	Joe Gibbs Racing	Chevrolet
21	Morgan Shepherd	Wood Brothers Racing	Ford
22	Sterling Marlin	Junior Johnson & Associates	Ford
23	Eddie Bierschwale	B&B Racing	Oldsmobile
25	Ken Schrader	Hendrick Motorsports	Chevrolet
26	Brett Bodine	King Racing	Ford
28	Davey Allison	Robert Yates Racing	Ford
30	Michael Waltrip	Bahari Racing	Pontiac
33	Harry Gant	Leo Jackson Motorsports	Oldsmobile
41	Greg Sacks	Larry Hedrick Motorsports	Chevrolet
42	Kyle Petty	SABCO Racing	Pontiac
43	Richard Petty	Petty Enterprises	Pontiac
52	Jimmy Means	Jimmy Means Racing	Pontiac
55	Ted Musgrave	RaDiUs Motorsports	Oldsmobile
66	Jimmy Hensley (R)	Cale Yarborough Motorsports	Ford
68	Bobby Hamilton	TriStar Motorsports	Oldsmobile
71	Dave Marcis	Marcis Auto Racing	Chevrolet
94	Terry Labonte	Hagan Racing	Oldsmobile
98	Jimmy Spencer	Travis Carter Enterprises	Chevrolet

== Qualifying ==
Qualifying was split into two rounds. The first round was held on Friday, April 24, at 3:00 PM EST. Each driver would have one lap to set a time. During the first round, the top 20 drivers in the round would be guaranteed a starting spot in the race. If a driver was not able to guarantee a spot in the first round, they had the option to scrub their time from the first round and try and run a faster lap time in a second round qualifying run, held on Saturday, April 25, at 12:30 PM EST. As with the first round, each driver would have one lap to set a time. For this specific race, positions 21-30 would be decided on time, and depending on who needed it, a select amount of positions were given to cars who had not otherwise qualified but were high enough in owner's points; which was usually two. If needed, a past champion who did not qualify on either time or provisionals could use a champion's provisional, adding one more spot to the field.

Darrell Waltrip, driving for his own Darrell Waltrip Motorsports team, won the pole, setting a time of 20.371 and an average speed of 92.956 mph (149.598 km/h) in the first round.

Two drivers would fail to qualify.

=== Full qualifying results ===
Pos.	#	Driver	Team	Make	Time	Speed
1	17	Darrell Waltrip	Darrell Waltrip Motorsports	Chevrolet	20.371	92.956
2	3	Dale Earnhardt	Richard Childress Racing	Chevrolet	20.418	92.742
3	26	Brett Bodine	King Racing	Ford	20.420	92.733
4	10	Derrike Cope	Whitcomb Racing	Chevrolet	20.436	92.660
5	5	Ricky Rudd	Hendrick Motorsports	Chevrolet	20.446	92.615
6	66	Jimmy Hensley (R)	Cale Yarborough Motorsports	Ford	20.467	92.520
7	2	Rusty Wallace	Penske Racing South	Pontiac	20.511	92.321
8	30	Michael Waltrip	Bahari Racing	Pontiac	20.519	92.285
9	7	Alan Kulwicki	AK Racing	Ford	20.559	92.106
10	11	Bill Elliott	Junior Johnson & Associates	Ford	20.566	92.074
11	1	Rick Mast	Precision Products Racing	Oldsmobile	20.568	92.065
12	15	Geoff Bodine	Bud Moore Engineering	Ford	20.579	92.016
13	71	Dave Marcis	Marcis Auto Racing	Chevrolet	20.590	91.967
14	6	Mark Martin	Roush Racing	Ford	20.611	91.873
15	33	Harry Gant	Leo Jackson Motorsports	Oldsmobile	20.652	91.691
16	4	Ernie Irvan	Morgan–McClure Motorsports	Chevrolet	20.704	91.461
17	42	Kyle Petty	SABCO Racing	Pontiac	20.726	91.364
18	25	Ken Schrader	Hendrick Motorsports	Chevrolet	20.772	91.161
19	94	Terry Labonte	Hagan Racing	Oldsmobile	20.811	90.990
20	21	Morgan Shepherd	Wood Brothers Racing	Ford	20.811	90.990
Failed to lock in Round 1
21	18	Dale Jarrett	Joe Gibbs Racing	Chevrolet	20.510	92.326
22	22	Sterling Marlin	Junior Johnson & Associates	Ford	20.540	92.191
23	28	Davey Allison	Robert Yates Racing	Ford	20.545	92.168
24	9	Dave Mader III	Melling Racing	Ford	20.550	92.146
25	41	Greg Sacks	Larry Hedrick Motorsports	Chevrolet	20.559	92.106
26	12	Hut Stricklin	Bobby Allison Motorsports	Chevrolet	20.623	91.820
27	8	Dick Trickle	Stavola Brothers Racing	Ford	20.628	91.798
28	55	Ted Musgrave	RaDiUs Motorsports	Oldsmobile	20.791	91.078
29	43	Richard Petty	Petty Enterprises	Pontiac	20.839	90.868
30	16	Wally Dallenbach Jr.	Roush Racing	Ford	20.855	90.798
Provisionals
31	68	Bobby Hamilton	TriStar Motorsports	Oldsmobile	20.862	90.768
32	52	Jimmy Means	Jimmy Means Racing	Pontiac	21.318	88.826
Failed to qualify
33	23	Eddie Bierschwale	B&B Racing	Oldsmobile	-*	-*
34	98	Jimmy Spencer	Travis Carter Enterprises	Chevrolet	-*	-*
Official first round qualifying results
Official starting lineup

== Race results ==
Fin	St	#	Driver	Team	Make	Laps	Led	Status	Pts	Winnings
1	14	6	Mark Martin	Roush Racing	Ford	500	33	running	180	$59,300
2	22	22	Sterling Marlin	Junior Johnson & Associates	Ford	500	0	running	170	$32,775
3	1	17	Darrell Waltrip	Darrell Waltrip Motorsports	Chevrolet	499	0	running	165	$30,700
4	19	94	Terry Labonte	Hagan Racing	Oldsmobile	499	0	running	160	$19,700
5	15	33	Harry Gant	Leo Jackson Motorsports	Oldsmobile	498	0	running	155	$22,875
6	20	21	Morgan Shepherd	Wood Brothers Racing	Ford	498	0	running	150	$16,400
7	18	25	Ken Schrader	Hendrick Motorsports	Chevrolet	498	0	running	146	$17,700
8	3	26	Brett Bodine	King Racing	Ford	498	9	running	147	$15,850
9	2	3	Dale Earnhardt	Richard Childress Racing	Chevrolet	497	167	running	143	$22,550
10	10	11	Bill Elliott	Junior Johnson & Associates	Ford	497	0	running	134	$16,900
11	26	12	Hut Stricklin	Bobby Allison Motorsports	Chevrolet	495	0	running	130	$11,835
12	25	41	Greg Sacks	Larry Hedrick Motorsports	Chevrolet	495	0	running	127	$5,450
13	31	68	Bobby Hamilton	TriStar Motorsports	Oldsmobile	494	0	running	124	$11,050
14	11	1	Rick Mast	Precision Products Racing	Oldsmobile	490	0	running	121	$10,850
15	6	66	Jimmy Hensley (R)	Cale Yarborough Motorsports	Ford	488	0	running	118	$8,950
16	9	7	Alan Kulwicki	AK Racing	Ford	464	219	running	125	$25,200
17	27	8	Dick Trickle	Stavola Brothers Racing	Ford	464	0	running	112	$10,050
18	17	42	Kyle Petty	SABCO Racing	Pontiac	450	0	crash	109	$9,455
19	30	16	Wally Dallenbach Jr.	Roush Racing	Ford	450	0	running	106	$4,150
20	28	55	Ted Musgrave	RaDiUs Motorsports	Oldsmobile	440	0	running	103	$9,650
21	24	9	Dave Mader III	Melling Racing	Ford	438	7	running	105	$9,050
22	4	10	Derrike Cope	Whitcomb Racing	Chevrolet	434	0	running	97	$6,100
23	5	5	Ricky Rudd	Hendrick Motorsports	Chevrolet	426	0	running	94	$11,850
24	13	71	Dave Marcis	Marcis Auto Racing	Chevrolet	406	0	axle	91	$5,150
25	16	4	Ernie Irvan	Morgan–McClure Motorsports	Chevrolet	386	65	axle	93	$14,000
26	23	28	Davey Allison	Robert Yates Racing	Ford	383	0	crash	85	$13,500
27	8	30	Michael Waltrip	Bahari Racing	Pontiac	358	0	running	82	$4,850
28	21	18	Dale Jarrett	Joe Gibbs Racing	Chevrolet	351	0	running	79	$5,225
29	29	43	Richard Petty	Petty Enterprises	Pontiac	286	0	engine	76	$7,600
30	32	52	Jimmy Means	Jimmy Means Racing	Pontiac	232	0	handling	73	$4,525
31	7	2	Rusty Wallace	Penske Racing South	Pontiac	176	0	valve	70	$11,000
32	12	15	Geoff Bodine	Bud Moore Engineering	Ford	104	0	engine	67	$8,000
Official race results

== Standings after the race ==
Drivers' Championship standings

	Pos	Driver	Points
	1	Davey Allison	1,214
	2	Harry Gant	1,198 (-16)
1	3	Terry Labonte	1,173 (-41)
1	4	Bill Elliott	1,157 (–57)
	5	Alan Kulwicki	1,131 (–83)
1	6	Morgan Shepherd	1,119 (–95)
1	7	Dale Earnhardt	1,070 (–144)
2	8	Geoff Bodine	1,052 (–162)
	9	Dick Trickle	1,005 (–209)
2	10	Mark Martin	1,001 (–213)
Official driver's standings

- Note: Only the first 10 positions are included for the driver standings.

Previous race: 1992 First Union 400	NASCAR Winston Cup Series; 1992 season	Next race: 1992 Winston 500
