= 1992 NASCAR Winston Cup Series =

American motorsport season

Seasons
- ← 1991 1993 →

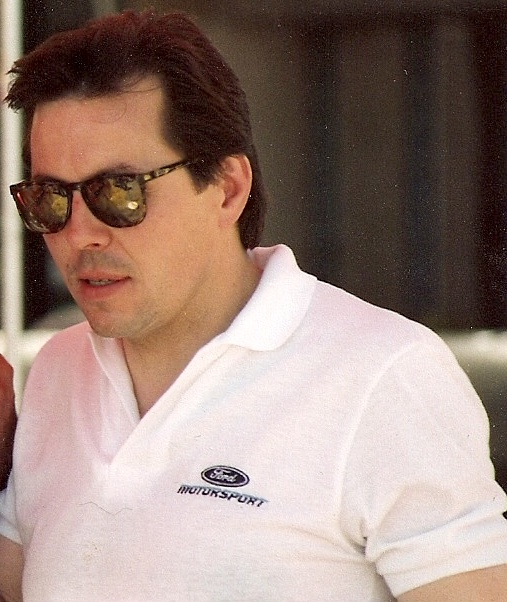
Alan Kulwicki won the Winston Cup championship as an owner/driver.

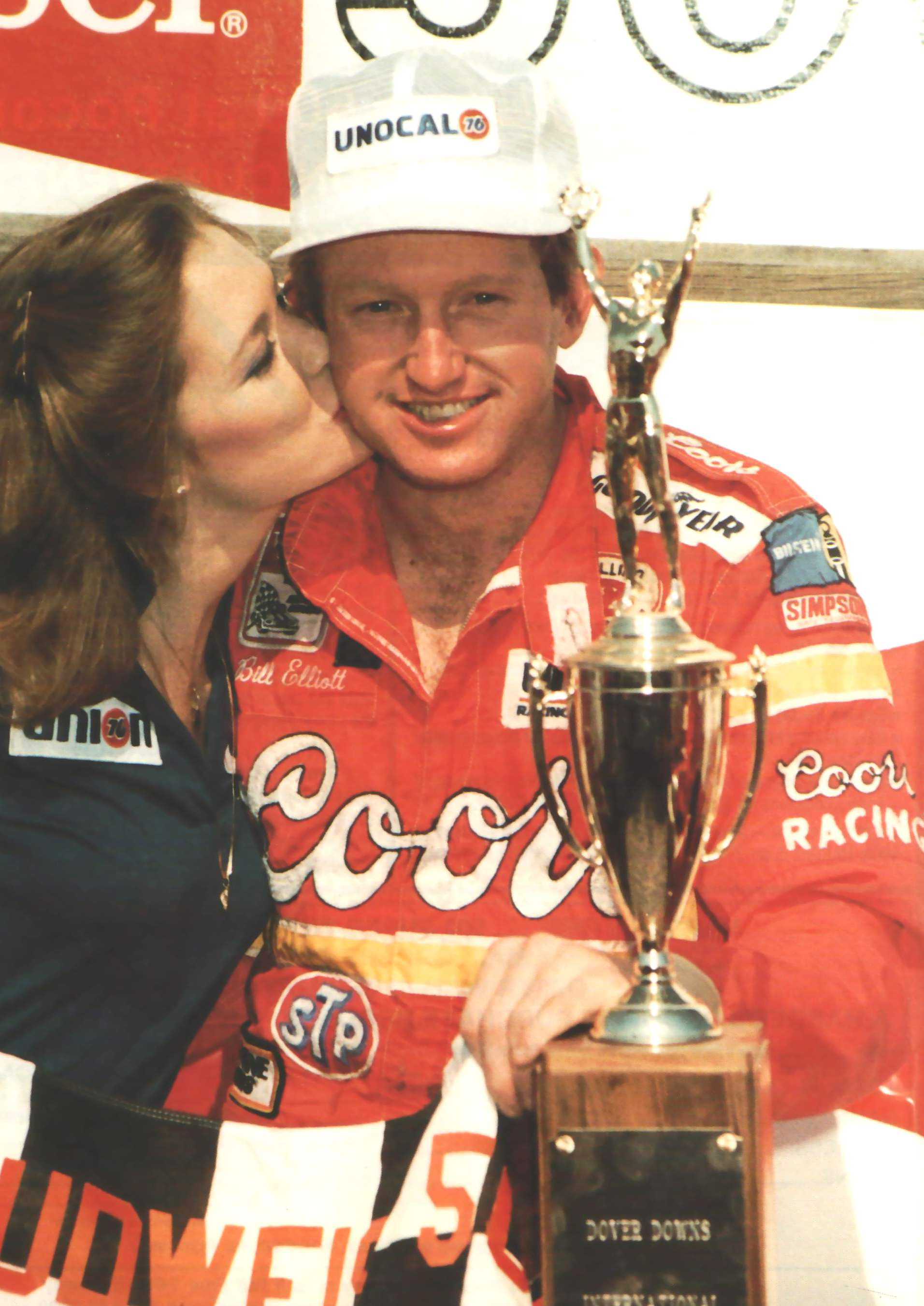
Bill Elliott finished second in the championship.

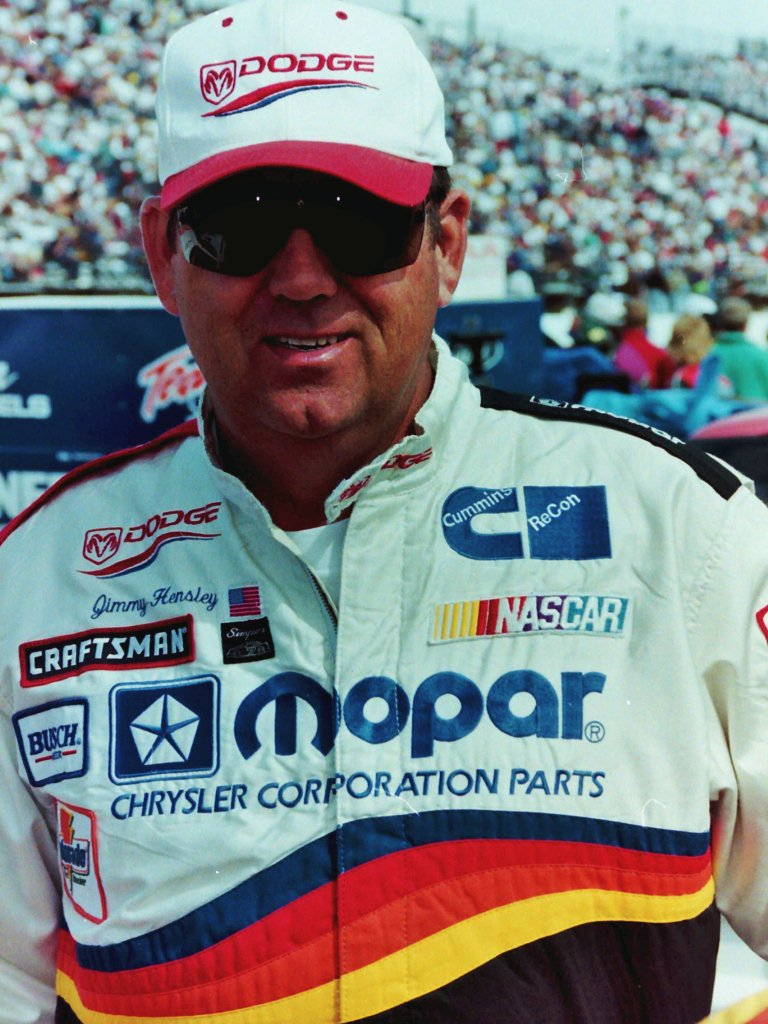
Jimmy Hensley, the Winston Cup Rookie of the Year.

The 1992 NASCAR Winston Cup Series was the 44th season of professional stock car racing in the United States and the 21st modern-era Cup season. The season began on February 9, 1992, and ended on November 15, 1992. Independent owner/driver Alan Kulwicki of AK Racing won the Winston Cup championship.

The Generation 4 car was introduced this season, when body panels were removed, teams spent hours in a wind tunnel to gain aerodynamics, the led shot was replaced by the led ingot, the fuel mileage was cut for the drivers to lead more laps, and the bumpers, nose, and tail were composed to mullet fiber glass.

The 1992 season was considered one of the most dramatic and emotional years in NASCAR. The seven-time champion, and "King of stock car racing," Richard Petty retired from the sport at the season's end, concluding a year-long "Fan Appreciation Tour." Petty appeared across the country for autographs and diecast cars were made of his No. 43 car for all 29 of the races he appeared in. The season also saw the quiet debut of a future champion Jeff Gordon, who was planning to move up after two seasons in the Busch Series. Gordon debuted his now-iconic No. 24 DuPont "Rainbow Warrior" Chevrolet at the final race of the year.

The season-long championship battle narrowed down to six drivers, the most ever going into the final race of the season. Davey Allison won the season-opening Daytona 500, and despite a roller-coaster season, remained first, or near the top of the standings all season. Bill Elliott and Kulwicki experienced more consistent results, placing them comfortably near the top. Harry Gant, Mark Martin and Kyle Petty were also factors during the season. Two-time defending champion Dale Earnhardt, however, suffered a dismal season, winning only one race, dropping out several times, and finished outside the top ten at season's end, for just the second time in his Cup career.

The season's climax occurred at the final race of the season, the Hooters 500 at Atlanta. Six drivers entered the race with a mathematical chance at winning the Winston Cup championship. Davey Allison led the charge, but ultimately fell short when he was involved in an accident. The race and the championship came down to a two-man battle between Bill Elliott and Alan Kulwicki. Elliott won the race, while Kulwicki finished second. Kulwicki led 103 laps during the race (compared to 102 by Elliott), clinched the 5 bonus points for leading the most laps, and won the Winston Cup title.

Tragically, only months later, both Kulwicki and Allison would be killed in separate aviation crashes.

The 1992 season was also the final year of Oldsmobile as a manufacturer in the series. The 1992 season was also the first Manufacturers' championship for Ford since 1969. Ford swept the top three in points snapping GM's streak of 16 straight manufacturers' championships (between Chevrolet and Buick).

== Teams and drivers ==
=== Complete schedule ===
Manufacturer	Team	No.	Driver	Crew chief
Chevrolet	Darrell Waltrip Motorsports	17	Darrell Waltrip	Jeff Hammond 17; Jake Elder 13
Chevrolet	Hendrick Motorsports	5	Ricky Rudd	Gary DeHart
Chevrolet	Hendrick Motorsports	25	Ken Schrader	Richard Broome 7 Ken Howes 23
Chevrolet	Joe Gibbs Racing	18	Dale Jarrett	Jimmy Makar
Chevrolet	Larry Hedrick Motorsports	41	Greg Sacks 20	Dennis Conner
Chevrolet	Larry Hedrick Motorsports	41	Dave Marcis 7	Dennis Conner
Chevrolet	Larry Hedrick Motorsports	41	Hut Stricklin 2	Dennis Conner
Chevrolet	Marcis Auto Racing	71	Dave Marcis 22	Bob Marcis
Chevrolet	Marcis Auto Racing	71	Jim Sauter 7	Bob Marcis
Chevrolet	Morgan-McClure Motorsports	4	Ernie Irvan	Tony Glover
Chevrolet	Richard Childress Racing	3	Dale Earnhardt	Kirk Shelmerdine
Chevrolet	Whitcomb Racing	10	Derrike Cope	Doug Williams 1 Barry Dodson 28
Ford	AK Racing	7	Alan Kulwicki	Paul Andrews
Ford	Bud Moore Engineering	15	Geoff Bodine	Donnie Wingo
Ford	Cale Yarborough Motorsports	66	Chad Little 6	
Ford	Cale Yarborough Motorsports	66	Bobby Hillin Jr. 1	
Ford	Cale Yarborough Motorsports	66	Jimmy Hensley 22 (R)	
Ford	Junior Johnson & Associates	11	Bill Elliott	Tim Brewer
Ford	Junior Johnson & Associates	22	Sterling Marlin	Mike Beam
Ford	King Racing	26	Brett Bodine	Donnie Richeson
Ford	RaDiUs Motorsports	55	Ted Musgrave	James Ince
Ford	Robert Yates Racing	28	Davey Allison	Larry McReynolds
Ford	Roush Racing	6	Mark Martin	Steve Hmiel
Ford	Roush Racing	16	Wally Dallenbach Jr.	Steve Lloyd
Ford	Stavola Brothers Racing	8	Rick Wilson 1	Ken Wilson
Ford	Stavola Brothers Racing	8	Dick Trickle 28	Ken Wilson
Ford	Wood Brothers Racing	21	Morgan Shepherd	Leonard Wood
Oldsmobile	Hagan Racing	94	Terry Labonte	Dewey Livengood
Oldsmobile	Leo Jackson Motorsports	33	Harry Gant	Andy Petree
Oldsmobile	Precision Products Racing	1	Rick Mast	Richard Jackson
Oldsmobile	Tri-Star Motorsports	68	Bobby Hamilton	
Pontiac	Bahari Racing	30	Michael Waltrip	Bill Ingle 21; Doug Hewitt 8
Pontiac	Penske Racing	2	Rusty Wallace	Eddie Dickerson 17; Buddy Parrott 12
Pontiac	Petty Enterprises	43	Richard Petty	Robbie Loomis
Pontiac	SABCO Racing	42	Kyle Petty	Robin Pemberton
Pontiac 28 Ford 1	Means Racing	52	Jimmy Means 25	
Pontiac 28 Ford 1	Means Racing	52	Brad Teague 1	
Pontiac 28 Ford 1	Means Racing	52	Tommy Kendall 1	
Pontiac 28 Ford 1	Means Racing	52	Scott Sharp 1	
Pontiac 28 Ford 1	Means Racing	52	Scott Gaylord 1	
Chevrolet 24 Ford 5	Bobby Allison Motorsports	12	Hut Stricklin 21	Jimmy Fennig
Chevrolet 24 Ford 5	Bobby Allison Motorsports	12	Jeff Purvis 4	Jimmy Fennig
Chevrolet 24 Ford 5	Bobby Allison Motorsports	12	Jimmy Spencer 4	Jimmy Fennig

=== Limited schedule ===
Manufacturer	Team	No.	Race driver	Crew chief	Round(s)
Buick	Adele Emerson	44	Jack Sellers		1
Buick	Balogh Racing	77	Mike Potter		8
Chevrolet	Balogh Racing	77	Mike Potter		9
Chevrolet	Active Motorsports	32	Jimmy Horton	David Ifft	11
Chevrolet	Ball Motorsports	99	Brad Teague		2
Chevrolet	B&B Racing	14	A. J. Foyt		1
Chevrolet	BS&S Motorsports	49	Stanley Smith	Philippe Lopez	15
Chevrolet	Chesrown Racing	37	Rick Carelli	David Ifft	2
Chevrolet	Close Racing	47	Buddy Baker		1
Chevrolet	Diamond Ridge Racing	29	John Krebs	Bob Rahilly	2
Chevrolet	Ed Ferree	45	Ed Ferree		2
Chevrolet	Folsom Racing	13	Dave Mader III		1
Chevrolet	Folsom Racing	13	Bob Schacht		1
Chevrolet	Folsom Racing	13	Stan Fox		2
Chevrolet	Hendrick Motorsports	24	Jeff Gordon	Ray Evernham	1
Chevrolet	Mansion Motorsports	13	Mike Skinner		3
Chevrolet	Mueller Brothers Racing	89	Jim Sauter		3
Chevrolet	Phoenix Racing	51	Jeff Purvis		2
Chevrolet	Scribner Racing	51	Rick Scribner	Cliff Duvall	2
Chevrolet	Team Ireland	31	Bobby Hillin Jr.	Tony Price 5 Doug Hewitt 7	12
Chevrolet	Travis Carter Enterprises	98	Jimmy Spencer		11
Chevrolet	Venturini Motorsports	35	Bill Venturini		2
Chevrolet	Speed Racing	83	Lake Speed		3
Ford	Speed Racing	83	Lake Speed		8
Ford	Barkdoll Racing	73	Bill Schmitt		1
Ford	Cicci Racing	34	Todd Bodine		1
Ford	Jeff Davis Racing	44	Jeff Davis	Rod Pool	1
Ford	Donlavey Racing	90	Dorsey Schroeder	Junie Donlavey	1
Ford	Donlavey Racing	90	Charlie Glotzbach	Junie Donlavey	7
Ford	Donlavey Racing	90	Kerry Teague	Junie Donlavey	1
Ford	Donlavey Racing	90	Hut Stricklin	Junie Donlavey	4
Ford	Donlavey Racing	90	Pancho Carter	Junie Donlavey	1
Ford	Donlavey Racing	90	Bobby Hillin Jr.	Junie Donlavey	1
Ford	Donlavey Racing	91	Kerry Teague	Junie Donlavey	1
Ford	Gray Racing	62	Ben Hess		1
Ford	H. L. Waters Motorsports	0	Delma Cowart		8
Ford	Junior Johnson & Associates	97	Hut Stricklin		1
Ford	Melling Racing	9	Phil Parsons	Gene Roberts	2
Ford	Melling Racing	9	Dorsey Schroeder	Gene Roberts	1
Ford	Melling Racing	9	Dave Mader III	Gene Roberts	6
Ford	Melling Racing	9	Chad Little	Gene Roberts	13
Ford	Melling Racing	9	Bill Schmitt	Gene Roberts	1
Ford	Pat Rissi Racing	59	Andy Belmont (R)		11
Ford	TTC Motorsports Inc.	45	Rich Bickle		4
Ford	TTC Motorsports Inc.	50	Hershel McGriff		1
Ford	Moroso Racing	20	Jimmy Spencer		1
Oldsmobile	Moroso Racing	20	Mike Wallace		2
Oldsmobile	Moroso Racing	20	Joe Ruttman		1
Oldsmobile	B&B Racing	14	A. J. Foyt	Tex Powell	1
Oldsmobile	B&B Racing	23	Eddie Bierschwale	Don Bierschwale	9
Oldsmobile	Barkdoll Racing	73	Phil Barkdoll		4
Oldsmobile	Close Racing	47	Buddy Baker	David Ifft	5
Oldsmobile	Collins Racing	97	Mark Gibson		1
Oldsmobile	KT Motorsports	03	Kerry Teague		1
Pontiac	88 Racing	88	Joe Booher		1
Pontiac	Bailey Racing	36	H. B. Bailey		2
Pontiac	Clay Young	50	Clay Young		4
Pontiac	Gilliland Racing	24	Butch Gilliland		2
Pontiac	Rusty Wallace Racing	24	Kenny Wallace		1
Pontiac	Means Racing	53	John McFadden		5
Pontiac	Means Racing	53	Graham Taylor		2
Pontiac	Means Racing	77	Mike Potter		1
Pontiac	Porter Racing	32	Randy Porter		5
Pontiac 15 Chevrolet 4	Hylton Motorsports	48	James Hylton		19
Chevrolet 3 Oldsmobile 1	Linro Motorsports	27	Gary Balough		1
Chevrolet 3 Oldsmobile 1	Linro Motorsports	27	Bob Schacht		2
Chevrolet 3 Oldsmobile 1	Linro Motorsports	27	Jeff McClure		1

== Schedule ==
No.	Race title	Track	Date
	Busch Clash	Daytona International Speedway, Daytona Beach	February 9
	Gatorade Twin 125 Qualifiers	Daytona International Speedway, Daytona Beach	February 13
1	Daytona 500	Daytona International Speedway, Daytona Beach	February 16
2	GM Goodwrench 500	Rockingham Speedway, Rockingham	March 1
3	Pontiac Excitement 400	Richmond International Raceway, Richmond	March 8
4	Motorcraft Quality Parts 500	Atlanta Motor Speedway, Hampton	March 15
5	TranSouth 500	Darlington Raceway, Darlington	March 29
6	Food City 500	Bristol International Raceway, Bristol	April 5
7	First Union 400	North Wilkesboro Speedway, North Wilkesboro	April 12
8	Hanes 500	Martinsville Speedway, Ridgeway	April 26
9	Winston 500	Talladega Superspeedway, Lincoln	May 3
	Winston Open	Charlotte Motor Speedway, Concord	May 16
	The Winston	Charlotte Motor Speedway, Concord	May 16
10	Coca-Cola 600	Charlotte Motor Speedway, Concord	May 24
11	Budweiser 500	Dover Downs International Speedway, Dover	May 31
12	Save Mart 300K	Sears Point Raceway, Sonoma	June 7
13	Champion Spark Plug 500	Pocono International Raceway, Long Pond	June 14
14	Miller Genuine Draft 400	Michigan International Speedway, Brooklyn	June 21
15	Pepsi 400	Daytona International Speedway, Daytona Beach	July 4
16	Miller Genuine Draft 500	Pocono International Raceway, Long Pond	July 19
17	DieHard 500	Talladega Superspeedway, Lincoln	July 26
18	Budweiser at The Glen	Watkins Glen International, Watkins Glen	August 9
19	Champion Spark Plug 400	Michigan International Speedway, Brooklyn	August 16
20	Bud 500	Bristol International Raceway, Bristol	August 29
21	Mountain Dew Southern 500	Darlington Raceway, Darlington	September 6
22	Miller Genuine Draft 400	Richmond International Raceway, Richmond	September 12
23	Peak Antifreeze 500	Dover Downs International Speedway, Dover	September 20
24	Goody's 500	Martinsville Speedway, Ridgeway	September 28
25	Tyson/Holly Farms 400	North Wilkesboro Speedway, North Wilkesboro	October 5
26	Mello Yello 500	Charlotte Motor Speedway, Concord	October 11
27	AC Delco 500	Rockingham Speedway, Rockingham	October 25
28	Pyroil 500K	Phoenix International Raceway, Phoenix	November 1
29	Hooters 500	Atlanta Motor Speedway, Hampton	November 15

== Races ==
No.	Race	Pole position	Most laps led	Winning driver	Manufacturer
	Busch Clash	Brett Bodine	Geoff Bodine	Geoff Bodine	Ford
	Gatorade Twin 125 #1	Sterling Marlin	Dale Earnhardt	Dale Earnhardt	Chevrolet
	Gatorade Twin 125 #2	Bill Elliott	Bill Elliott	Bill Elliott	Ford
1	Daytona 500	Sterling Marlin	Davey Allison	Davey Allison	Ford
2	GM Goodwrench 500	Kyle Petty	Bill Elliott	Bill Elliott	Ford
3	Pontiac Excitement 400	Bill Elliott	Bill Elliott	Bill Elliott	Ford
4	Motorcraft Quality Parts 500	Mark Martin	Davey Allison	Bill Elliott	Ford
5	TranSouth 500	Sterling Marlin	Davey Allison	Bill Elliott	Ford
6	Food City 500	Alan Kulwicki	Alan Kulwicki	Alan Kulwicki	Ford
7	First Union 400	Alan Kulwicki	Alan Kulwicki	Davey Allison	Ford
8	Hanes 500	Darrell Waltrip	Alan Kulwicki	Mark Martin	Ford
9	Winston 500	Ernie Irvan	Davey Allison	Davey Allison	Ford
	Winston Open	Brett Bodine	Sterling Marlin	Michael Waltrip	Pontiac
	The Winston	Davey Allison	Davey Allison	Davey Allison	Ford
10	Coca-Cola 600	Bill Elliott	Kyle Petty	Dale Earnhardt	Chevrolet
11	Budweiser 500	Brett Bodine	Darrell Waltrip	Harry Gant	Oldsmobile
12	Save Mart 300K	Ricky Rudd	Bill Elliott	Ernie Irvan	Chevrolet
13	Champion Spark Plug 500	Ken Schrader	Alan Kulwicki	Alan Kulwicki	Ford
14	Miller Genuine Draft 400	Davey Allison	Davey Allison	Davey Allison	Ford
15	Pepsi 400	Sterling Marlin	Ernie Irvan	Ernie Irvan	Chevrolet
16	Miller Genuine Draft 500	Davey Allison	Davey Allison	Darrell Waltrip	Chevrolet
17	DieHard 500	Sterling Marlin	Ricky Rudd	Ernie Irvan	Chevrolet
18	Budweiser at The Glen	Dale Earnhardt	Ernie Irvan; Kyle Petty	Kyle Petty	Pontiac
19	Champion Spark Plug 400	Alan Kulwicki	Bill Elliott	Harry Gant	Oldsmobile
20	Bud 500	Ernie Irvan	Darrell Waltrip	Darrell Waltrip	Chevrolet
21	Mountain Dew Southern 500	Sterling Marlin	Harry Gant	Darrell Waltrip	Chevrolet
22	Miller Genuine Draft 400	Ernie Irvan	Rusty Wallace	Rusty Wallace	Pontiac
23	Peak AntiFreeze 500	Alan Kulwicki	Bill Elliott	Ricky Rudd	Chevrolet
24	Goody's 500	Kyle Petty	Rusty Wallace	Geoff Bodine	Ford
25	Tyson Holly Farms 400	Alan Kulwicki	Geoff Bodine	Geoff Bodine	Ford
26	Mello Yello 500	Alan Kulwicki	Kyle Petty	Mark Martin	Ford
27	AC Delco 500	Kyle Petty	Kyle Petty	Kyle Petty	Pontiac
28	Pyroil 500K	Rusty Wallace	Rusty Wallace	Davey Allison	Ford
29	Hooters 500	Rick Mast	Alan Kulwicki	Bill Elliott	Ford

=== Busch Clash ===
The Busch Clash, an exhibition event for all 1991 Busch Pole winners, and one "wild card" (from the fastest second round qualifiers from 1991), was held on Saturday, February 9 at Daytona International Speedway. Brett Bodine drew the pole.

Top-ten results:

1. #15 - Geoff Bodine
2. #4 - Ernie Irvan
3. #6 - Mark Martin
4. #28 - Davey Allison
5. #7 - Alan Kulwicki
6. #22 - Sterling Marlin
7. #11 - Bill Elliott
8. #30 - Michael Waltrip
9. #5 - Ricky Rudd
10. #66 - Chad Little
- The race consisted of two 10-lap "sprint" segments, separated by a competition yellow, during which the field would be inverted.
- Sterling Marlin won the first 10-lap segment, and Geoff Bodine won the second 10-lap segment, to claim the overall victory.
- Except for the 2-lap competition yellow, the race otherwise was completed caution-free.
- This was the first Busch Clash to be held on a Saturday. The move was made at the request of CBS, who wanted the additional time on Sunday for their coverage of the 1992 Winter Olympics in Albertville, France.

=== Gatorade 125s ===
The Gatorade 125-mile qualifying races for the Daytona 500 were held Thursday, February 13 at Daytona International Speedway. Sterling Marlin and Bill Elliott started first in each of the races, respectively.

Top-five results: (Race 1)

1. #3 - Dale Earnhardt
2. #6 - Mark Martin
3. #4 - Ernie Irvan
4. #41 - Greg Sacks
5. #33 - Harry Gant

Top-five results: (Race 2)

1. #11 - Bill Elliott
2. #21 - Morgan Shepherd
3. #28 - Davey Allison
4. #5 - Ricky Rudd
5. #30 - Michael Waltrip
- During the second race, a crash on lap 4 took out several cars, including Alan Kulwicki, Terry Labonte and A. J. Foyt. Richard Petty also wrecked out on lap 8. All four would qualify for the Daytona 500 based on speed or by provisional.

=== 34th Daytona 500 by STP ===
The Daytona 500 was held on February 16 at Daytona International Speedway. Sterling Marlin won the pole.

Top-ten results:

1. #28 - Davey Allison
2. #21 - Morgan Shepherd
3. #15 - Geoff Bodine
4. #7 - Alan Kulwicki*
5. #75 - Dick Trickle*
6. #42 - Kyle Petty
7. #94 - Terry Labonte
8. #55 - Ted Musgrave
9. #3 - Dale Earnhardt
10. #9 - Phil Parsons

Failed to qualify: #99 - Brad Teague, #59 - Andy Belmont, #89 - Jim Sauter, #23 - Eddie Bierschwale, #83 - Lake Speed, #13 - Dave Mader III, #98 - Jimmy Spencer, #20 - Mike Wallace, #62 - Ben Hess, #13 - Mike Skinner, #88 - Joe Booher, #50 - Clay Young, #48 - James Hylton, #52 - Jimmy Means, #97 - Mark Gibson

- The "Big One" took place on lap 92 after contact between Bill Elliott, Ernie Irvan, and Sterling Marlin, collecting 14 cars in total. Richard Petty, in his final Daytona 500, was among those involved. Petty was able to continue the race, and finish 16th.
- This would be the final Daytona 500 start for both Richard Petty and A. J. Foyt.
- Three weeks removed from leading Washington to victory in Super Bowl XXVI; Joe Gibbs made his debut as a car owner, fielding the #18 Chevy with Dale Jarrett driving. Jarrett would finish 36th after being collected in the aforementioned "Big One".
- Alan Kulwicki rallied to finished 4th after starting the race in 41st, and getting collected in the 14-car pileup.
- Dick Trickle finished 5th in what would be the final start for RahMoc Enterprises, as co-owners Bob Rahilly and Butch Mock would part ways after the race. Mock later reformed the team as Butch Mock Motorsports.

=== GM Goodwrench 500 ===
The GM Goodwrench 500 was held March 1 at Rockingham. Kyle Petty won the pole.

Top-ten results

1. #11 - Bill Elliott*
2. #28 - Davey Allison
3. #33 - Harry Gant
4. #30 - Michael Waltrip -1 lap
5. #25 - Ken Schrader -1 lap
6. #6 - Mark Martin -2 laps
7. #94 - Terry Labonte -2 laps
8. #26 - Brett Bodine -2 laps
9. #12 - Hut Stricklin -2 laps
10. #17 - Darrell Waltrip -2 laps

Failed to qualify: none

- Bill Elliott lead the final 213 laps, and won in only his second start with Junior Johnson Motorsports.
- Elliott and Davey Allison led a combined 450 of 492 laps.
- Polesitter Kyle Petty, the two-time defending race and pole position winner, was unable to make it three in a row. The Unocal 76 Challenge bonus money had now rolled over 25 races, and would be $197,600 for the next race.

=== Pontiac Excitement 400 ===
The Pontiac Excitement 400 was held March 8 at Richmond International Raceway. Bill Elliott won the pole.

Top-ten results

1. #11 - Bill Elliott*
2. #7 - Alan Kulwicki
3. #33 - Harry Gant
4. #28 - Davey Allison
5. #17 - Darrell Waltrip
6. #5 - Ricky Rudd
7. #22 - Sterling Marlin -1 lap
8. #94 - Terry Labonte -1 lap
9. #12 - Hut Stricklin -1 lap
10. #21 - Morgan Shepherd -1 lap

Failed to qualify: #59 - Andy Belmont, #32 - Randy Porter

- This was Bill Elliott's final win at a short track. He dominated by leading 348 of the 400 laps.
- Bill Elliott broke a streak of 25 rollovers, and claimed the Unocal 76 Challenge of $197,600 — the second-highest total awarded in the history of the program.

=== Motorcraft Quality Parts 500 ===
The Motorcraft Quality Parts 500 was held March 15 at Atlanta Motor Speedway. Mark Martin won the pole.

Top-ten results

1. #11 - Bill Elliott
2. #33 - Harry Gant
3. #3 - Dale Earnhardt
4. #28 - Davey Allison
5. #8 - Dick Trickle
6. #15 - Geoff Bodine
7. #7 - Alan Kulwicki
8. #42 - Kyle Petty
9. #94 - Terry Labonte
10. #21 - Morgan Shepherd

Failed to qualify: #95 - Bob Schacht, #85 - Mike Skinner, #50 - Clay Young, #77 - Mike Potter

- Bobby Labonte served as a relief driver for Ernie Irvan, after Irvan suffered injuries in the Busch Series race the previous day. Labonte took over the car on the first pit stop, and finished 25th.

=== TranSouth 500 ===
The TranSouth 500 was held March 29 at Darlington Raceway. Sterling Marlin won the pole.

Top-ten results

1. #11 - Bill Elliott*
2. #33 - Harry Gant
3. #6 - Mark Martin
4. #28 - Davey Allison* -1 lap
5. #5 - Ricky Rudd -1 lap
6. #26 - Brett Bodine -1 lap
7. #8 - Dick Trickle -2 laps
8. #15 - Geoff Bodine -2 laps
9. #94 - Terry Labonte -2 laps
10. #3 - Dale Earnhardt -2 laps

Failed to qualify: #49 - Stanley Smith, #62 - Mark Thompson, #23 - Eddie Bierschwale, #47 - Buddy Baker, #87 - Randy Baker, #24 - Kenny Wallace, #31 - Bobby Hillin Jr., #83 - Lake Speed, #13 - Mike Skinner

- This was Bill Elliott's record-tying fourth consecutive Cup Series victory, finishing ahead of Harry Gant, the last driver to accomplish this feat in September 1991.
- Despite the victories, Elliott still trailed behind Davey Allison in the points standings, as Allison's consistency allowed him to retain a 48-point lead over Elliott.

=== Food City 500 ===
The Food City 500 was held April 5 at Bristol International Raceway. Alan Kulwicki won the pole.

Top-ten results

1. #7 - Alan Kulwicki
2. #18 - Dale Jarrett*
3. #25 - Ken Schrader
4. #94 - Terry Labonte -1 lap
5. #8 - Dick Trickle -1 lap
6. #5 - Ricky Rudd -3 laps
7. #21 - Morgan Shepherd -4 laps
8. #12 - Hut Stricklin -5 laps
9. #2 - Rusty Wallace -6 laps
10. #10 - Derrike Cope -6 laps

Failed to qualify: #98 - Jimmy Spencer

- This was Joe Gibbs Racing's first top-5 finish.
- In what would be his first of multiple injuries throughout the season, points leader Davey Allison suffered a hard crash on lap 283, separating the cartilage around his rib cage and knocking two vertebrae out of place and finished 28th.
- Fortunately for Allison, Bill Elliott experienced trouble during the race, finishing 30 laps down in 20th, while Harry Gant blew an engine and finished 29th.
- This was the last asphalt race at Bristol International Raceway. After the race ended, the blacktop was torn up and a new concrete surface was laid down.

=== First Union 400 ===
The First Union 400 was held April 12 at North Wilkesboro Speedway. Alan Kulwicki won the pole.

Top-ten results

1. #28 - Davey Allison*
2. #2 - Rusty Wallace
3. #5 - Ricky Rudd
4. #15 - Geoff Bodine
5. #33 - Harry Gant
6. #3 - Dale Earnhardt
7. #7 - Alan Kulwicki
8. #22 - Sterling Marlin
9. #94 - Terry Labonte
10. #26 - Brett Bodine

Failed to qualify: #32 - Jimmy Horton, #9 - Dave Mader III, #48 - James Hylton.

- Allison's victory came while still recovering from injuries suffered at Bristol. Wearing a flak jacket and using an electrode-shock apparatus to help ease the pain, Allison held off Rusty Wallace to win, expanding his championship lead to 86 points.
- Prior to the race, a special tribute was held for Junior Johnson, a native of nearby Wilkesboro, North Carolina.
- The day before the race saw ESPN broadcaster Benny Parsons marry his second wife Terri just shy of one year after the death of Parsons' wife Connie.
- Jimmy Hensley qualified Allison's #28 Ford in 7th place.

=== Hanes 500 ===
The Hanes 500 was held April 26 at Martinsville Speedway. Darrell Waltrip won the pole.

Top-ten results

1. #6 - Mark Martin
2. #22 - Sterling Marlin
3. #17 - Darrell Waltrip -1 lap
4. #94 - Terry Labonte -1 lap
5. #33 - Harry Gant -2 laps
6. #21 - Morgan Shepherd -2 laps
7. #25 - Ken Schrader -2 laps
8. #26 - Brett Bodine -2 laps
9. #3 - Dale Earnhardt -3 laps
10. #11 - Bill Elliott -3 laps

Failed to qualify: #23 - Eddie Bierschwale, #98 - Jimmy Spencer, #65 - Jerry O'Neil

- Scheduling conflicts with ESPN's coverage of the 1992 NFL draft meant they were unable to carry the race live, forcing ESPN to air the race on tape the next day.
- Davey Allison suffered another hard crash on lap 387, bruising his lung, and aggravating the rib and spine injuries from Bristol. Allison finished 26th.

=== Winston 500 ===
The Winston 500 was held May 3 at Talladega Superspeedway. Ernie Irvan won the pole.

Top-ten results

1. #28 - Davey Allison*
2. #11 - Bill Elliott
3. #3 - Dale Earnhardt
4. #22 - Sterling Marlin
5. #4 - Ernie Irvan
6. #7 - Alan Kulwicki
7. #18 - Dale Jarrett
8. #6 - Mark Martin
9. #21 - Morgan Shepherd
10. #42 - Kyle Petty

Failed to qualify: #0 - Delma Cowart, #23 - Eddie Bierschwale, #48 - James Hylton, #73 - Phil Barkdoll, #77 - Mike Potter

- Buddy Baker made his 700th and final Winston Cup start in this race, starting 31st and finishing 36th. He would later attempt but fail to qualify for the 1993 DieHard 500, and at Daytona and Atlanta in 1994.
- For the second time of the season Davey Allison won just one week after getting injured in a crash.
- By winning this race, Allison became the only remaining contender for the Winston Million, having already won the Daytona 500. He would have to win either the Coca-Cola 600 at Charlotte or the Southern 500 at Darlington to claim the bonus.

=== The Winston Open ===
The Winston Open, a last chance race to qualify for The Winston, was held on May 16, 1992, at Charlotte Motor Speedway. Brett Bodine won the pole.

Top-five results:

1. #30 - Michael Waltrip
2. #12 - Hut Stricklin
3. #41 - Greg Sacks
4. #8 - Dick Trickle
5. #66 - Jimmy Hensley

=== The Winston ===
The 1992 edition of The Winston, took place on May 16, 1992. Davey Allison won the pole.

==== Criteria to qualify ====
- All active 1991 and 1992 race winning drivers.
- All active 1991 and 1992 race winning car owners.
- All active former Winston Cup Champions.
- Top 2 finishers from The Winston Open

Top-ten results:

1. #28 - Davey Allison*
2. #42 - Kyle Petty
3. #25 - Ken Schrader
4. #5 - Ricky Rudd
5. #11 - Bill Elliott
6. #2 - Rusty Wallace
7. #7 - Alan Kulwicki
8. #4 - Ernie Irvan
9. #43 - Richard Petty
10. #94 - Terry Labonte
- This was the first night race at Charlotte Motor Speedway following the installation of lights, and it became the first non-short track to host night racing.
- This race, nicknamed "One Hot Night," became famous for its intense finish. During the final 10-lap sprint, Dale Earnhardt led Kyle Petty and Davey Allison. On the final lap, Petty nudged Earnhardt in turn three, spinning him out. Petty took the lead into turn four, but as he entered the quad-oval, Davey Allison pulled alongside. The two cars touched as they crossed the finish line, with Allison edging out Petty by less than half a car length. The two cars clipped, and Allison crashed hard into the outside wall, showering bright sparks over the track. Allison suffered a concussion, and spent the night in the hospital instead of victory lane.

=== Coca-Cola 600 ===
The Coca-Cola 600 was held Sunday, May 24 at Charlotte Motor Speedway. Bill Elliott won the pole.

Top-ten results:

1. #3 - Dale Earnhardt*
2. #4 - Ernie Irvan
3. #42 - Kyle Petty
4. #28 - Davey Allison*
5. #33 - Harry Gant
6. #94 - Terry Labonte
7. #7 - Alan Kulwicki
8. #55 - Ted Musgrave
9. #5 - Ricky Rudd
10. #8 - Dick Trickle
11. #66 - Jimmy Hensley

Failed to qualify: #23 - Eddie Bierschwale, #48 - James Hylton, #0 - Delma Cowart, #77 - Mike Potter, #85 - Mike Skinner

- Despite spending two days in the hospital, nursing a broken collarbone, re-injured ribs, and bruises covering 60% of his body. Davey Allison ran the full 600-mile race and finished 4th.
- Allison's 4th-place finish denied him a chance to win the Winston Million. Allison would have one more chance to win the bonus at the Darlington in September.
- This was the first victory of the season for General Motors, as all races up to this point have been won by Ford.
- This would be Dale Earnhardt's lone victory of 1992 (with the exception of the Gatorade 125 qualifier at Daytona).
- Approaching his final green-flag pit stop, Earnhardt trailed by 3 seconds, but emerged with a 1.5-second lead, prompting several of his competitors to believe that Earnhardt broke the 55 mph pit road speed limit while exiting. No penalty was assessed.
- This would be the final Coca-Cola 600 scheduled to run during the daytime. Starting in 1993, the race was moved to a late afternoon/night race.

=== Budweiser 500 ===
The Budweiser 500 was held May 31 at Dover Downs International Speedway. Brett Bodine won the pole.

Top-ten results:

1. #33 - Harry Gant*
2. #3 - Dale Earnhardt
3. #2 - Rusty Wallace -1 lap
4. #4 - Ernie Irvan -1 lap
5. #17 - Darrell Waltrip -1 lap
6. #5 - Ricky Rudd -2 laps down
7. #12 - Hut Stricklin -2 laps
8. #66 - Jimmy Hensley -2 laps
9. #8 - Dick Trickle -2 laps
10. #21 - Morgan Shepherd -2 laps

Failed to qualify: none

- In a race decided on fuel milage, Gant's final pit stop was on lap 403, and Darrell Waltrip's last stop was on lap 406. Waltrip would run out of fuel with a lap and one half remaining, while Gant ran out on the backstretch on lap 500 with a one lap lead. Dale Earnhardt passed Gant to un-lap himself, and finished 26 seconds behind Gant.
- This race would be the first time radial tires were used at Dover.

=== Save Mart Supermarkets 300K ===
The Save Mart Supermarkets 300K was held June 7 at Sears Point Raceway. For the third consecutive year in this event Ricky Rudd won the pole.

Top-ten results:

1. #4 - Ernie Irvan*
2. #94 - Terry Labonte
3. #6 - Mark Martin
4. #5 - Ricky Rudd
5. #11 - Bill Elliott
6. #3 - Dale Earnhardt
7. #2 - Rusty Wallace
8. #17 - Darrell Waltrip
9. #25 - Ken Schrader
10. #15 - Geoff Bodine

Failed to qualify: #58 - Wayne Jacks, #04 - Bobby Woods

- This race was marred by the death of NASCAR founder Bill France Sr., who passed away on the day of the event. Race winner Irvan dedicated the race to France.
- Ernie Irvan overcame a stop-and-go penalty for jumping the initial start to win in the fastest Winston Cup race held on the 2.52-mile (4.06 km) configuration of Sears Point.
- Points leader Davey Allison suffered multiple issues throughout the race and finished 28th, reducing his points lead to just 28 points over Dale Earnhardt.
- Richard Petty's 21st-place finish would be the final lead-lap finish of his career.

=== Champion Spark Plug 500 ===
The Champion Spark Plug 500 was held June 14 at Pocono Raceway. Ken Schrader won the pole.

Top-ten results:

1. #7 - Alan Kulwicki*
2. #6 - Mark Martin
3. #11 - Bill Elliott
4. #25 - Ken Schrader
5. #28 - Davey Allison
6. #42 - Kyle Petty
7. #22 - Sterling Marlin
8. #26 - Brett Bodine
9. #66 - Jimmy Hensley
10. #94 - Terry Labonte

Failed to qualify: none

- In what would be the beginning of a brutal mid-season collapse for Dale Earnhardt, the #3 Chevy suffered a blown engine and finished 28th dropping Earnhardt to 5th in points.
- This would be Alan Kulwicki's last career victory. 1992 was also the only year in which Kulwicki won twice.
- This would be the last points race victory for Hooters as a primary sponsor until April 2024, 32 years later.

=== Miller Genuine Draft 400 ===
The Miller Genuine Draft 400 was held June 21 at Michigan International Speedway. Davey Allison won the pole.

Top-ten results:

1. #28 - Davey Allison*
2. #17 - Darrell Waltrip
3. #7 - Alan Kulwicki
4. #42 - Kyle Petty
5. #5 - Ricky Rudd
6. #6 - Mark Martin
7. #33 - Harry Gant
8. #55 - Ted Musgrave -1 lap
9. #3 - Dale Earnhardt -1 lap
10. #11 - Bill Elliott -1 lap

Failed to qualify: #98 - Jimmy Spencer, #35 - Bill Venturini, #47 - Buddy Baker, Ben Hess*

- After four wrecks and a plethora of misfortune, Allison's victory extended his championship lead to 67 points over Bill Elliott.
- Ben Hess, after failing to qualify, served as a relief driver for Michael Waltrip, who was injured in a crash in first round qualifying.

=== Indianapolis Motor Speedway test ===
On the way home from Michigan, on June 22–23, nine top NASCAR Winston Cup series teams were invited to Indianapolis to participate in a Goodyear tire test. Although no official announcements were made, it was in fact an unofficial feasibility test to see if stock cars would be competitive at the circuit. An estimated 10,000 spectators watched a rather exciting two days of history in the making. A. J. Foyt took a few laps around the track in Dale Earnhardt's car on the second day. ESPN covered the test.

Top speeds
Pos	Car #	Driver	Car Make	Entrant	Speed
1	11	Bill Elliott	Ford	Junior Johnson & Associates	168.767
2	4	Ernie Irvan	Chevrolet	Morgan-McClure Motorsports	167.817
3	2	Rusty Wallace	Pontiac	Penske Racing	166.704
4	42	Kyle Petty	Pontiac	SABCO Racing	166.199
5	5	Ricky Rudd	Chevrolet	Hendrick Motorsports	165.001
6	17	Darrell Waltrip	Chevrolet	Darrell Waltrip Motorsports	164.567
7	3	Dale Earnhardt	Chevrolet	Richard Childress Racing	163.194
8	6	Mark Martin	Ford	Roush Racing	162.346
9	3	A. J. Foyt	Chevrolet	Richard Childress Racing	161.452
10	28	Davey Allison	Ford	Robert Yates Racing	161.261

=== Pepsi 400 ===
The Pepsi 400 was held Saturday, July 4 at Daytona International Speedway. Sterling Marlin won the pole position, and Richard Petty qualified second, in his final race at Daytona.

Top-ten results:

1. #4 - Ernie Irvan
2. #22 - Sterling Marlin
3. #18 - Dale Jarrett
4. #15 - Geoff Bodine
5. #11 - Bill Elliott
6. #25 - Ken Schrader
7. #5 - Ricky Rudd
8. #6 - Mark Martin
9. #2 - Rusty Wallace
10. #28 - Davey Allison

Failed to qualify: #0 - Delma Cowart, #48 - James Hylton, #37 - Randy Porter

- This race was attended by President George H. W. Bush and he served as the grand marshal.
- A special ceremony was held during the pre-race festivities, honoring Richard Petty's final race at Daytona. Petty had spent time before the race testing at Daytona, in hopes that he might win the pole position and possibly be a factor in the race. Petty started 2nd, and led the first five laps (the final laps led of his long career). He dropped out in 36th due to heat-related fatigue. Eddie Bierschwale attempted to finish the race in Petty's car, but only ran a few laps.
- Harry Gant made his 400th career start in this race, finishing 2 laps down in 23rd.
- Dave Marcis made his 700th career start in this race, finishing 32nd with a blown engine.

Winston Cup points standings at halfway point (after 15 of 29 races)
Pos.	Driver	Points	Difference
1	Davey Allison	2257	Leader
2	Bill Elliott	2211	-46
3	Alan Kulwicki	2123	-134
4	Harry Gant	2085	-172
5	Dale Earnhardt	2005	-252
6	Mark Martin	1955	-302
7	Terry Labonte	1941	-316
8	Geoff Bodine	1905	-352
9	Ricky Rudd	1872	-385
10	Morgan Shepherd	1869	-388

=== Miller Genuine Draft 500 ===
The Miller Genuine Draft 500 was held July 19 at Pocono Raceway. Davey Allison won the pole.

Top-ten results:

1. #17 - Darrell Waltrip
2. #33 - Harry Gant
3. #7 - Alan Kulwicki
4. #5 - Ricky Rudd
5. #55 - Ted Musgrave
6. #6 - Mark Martin
7. #42 - Kyle Petty
8. #26 - Brett Bodine
9. #8 - Dick Trickle
10. #18 - Dale Jarrett

Failed to qualify: #0 - Delma Cowart, #37 - Randy Porter

- In a race that would change the outcome of the 1992 NASCAR Winston Cup season, Davey Allison and Darrell Waltrip made contact on lap 148 in turn 2. Allison's car went airborne and into a frightening barrel roll over the inside guardrail. Allison suffered a broken right forearm, a dislocated wrist, a skull fracture and a severe concussion. Allison was hospitalized in Pennsylvania for four days. Mark Martin was famously quoted as saying "They may as well get a body bag for Davey."
- Bill Elliott finished 13th, but took over the points lead for the first time all season, leading Allison by 9 points.
- Last career pole for Davey Allison.
- Richard Petty, in his final race at Pocono, qualified 7th and advanced as high as 5th place early in the race before finishing 20th, 1 lap down.
- Dale Earnhardt's engine problems continued as Richard Childress Racing had to change engines shortly before the race started. The two-time defending champion qualified 29th and finished 23rd.

=== DieHard 500 ===
The DieHard 500 was held July 26 at Talladega Superspeedway in Lincoln, Alabama. Sterling Marlin won the pole.

Top-ten results:

1. #4 - Ernie Irvan
2. #22 - Sterling Marlin
3. #28 - Davey Allison*
4. #5 - Ricky Rudd -1 lap
5. #11 - Bill Elliott -1 lap
6. #42 - Kyle Petty -1 lap
7. #30 - Michael Waltrip -1 lap
8. #9 - Chad Little -1 lap
9. #25 - Ken Schrader -1 lap
10. #26 - Brett Bodine -1 lap

Failed to qualify: #48 - James Hylton

- With a tailor-made cast, a wrist brace and velcro on the shifter, Davey Allison started the race and gained the all-important Winston Cup points. After 6 laps during the 1st caution, Bobby Hillin Jr. took over the car and nearly drove the Texaco Ford to victory.
- Dale Earnhardt suffered another engine failure and finished in last-place for the second time in three races. Earnhardt dropped to eighth in points, effectively taking him out of contention for a third consecutive Winston Cup title.
- Ernie Irvan suffered a flat tire on lap 5. When the yellow came out, he sped out of the pits to stay on the lead lap, but failed to beat leader Ricky Rudd to the line and was penalized to the rear of the field for speeding. He went on to pass everyone and get his lap back, and when the second (and only other) caution came out, he made up his lost lap.
- Thanks to Hillin's third-place finish, Allison retook the championship lead from Bill Elliott by one point.
- After falling out of the race, Earnhardt was briefly waiting in position as a possible substitute driver for Richard Petty. Ultimately, Petty would run the full race and finish 15th.

=== Budweiser at The Glen ===
The Budweiser at The Glen was held August 9 at Watkins Glen International. Dale Earnhardt won the pole.

Top-ten results:

1. #42 - Kyle Petty
2. #21 - Morgan Shepherd
3. #4 - Ernie Irvan
4. #6 - Mark Martin
5. #16 - Wally Dallenbach Jr.
6. #2 - Rusty Wallace
7. #7 - Alan Kulwicki
8. #94 - Terry Labonte
9. #3 - Dale Earnhardt
10. #26 - Brett Bodine

Failed to qualify: #61 - Tim Rotsell

- The race was shortened to 51 laps due to rain as NASCAR did not have rain tires to use at the time. The start of the race was also delayed by three hours due to rain.
- This was the first Winston Cup race with the new bus stop chicane, which was added following of J. D. McDuffie's fatal accident in 1991.
- Still suffering from his Pocono injuries, Davey Allison fell 17 points behind 14th-place finisher Bill Elliott, after Dorsey Schroeder relieved Allison mid-race and finished 20th. Alan Kulwicki's 7th-place finish reduced his interval to 94 points.
- Todd Bodine made his Winston Cup debut in this race. Bodine crashed out early and finished 37th.

=== Champion Spark Plug 400 ===
The Champion Spark Plug 400 was held August 16 at Michigan International Speedway. Alan Kulwicki won the pole.

Top-ten results:

1. #33 - Harry Gant*
2. #17 - Darrell Waltrip
3. #11 - Bill Elliott
4. #4 - Ernie Irvan
5. #28 - Davey Allison*
6. #42 - Kyle Petty
7. #22 - Sterling Marlin
8. #18 - Dale Jarrett
9. #6 - Mark Martin
10. #21 - Morgan Shepherd

Failed to qualify: #36 - H.B. Bailey, #48 - James Hylton, #65 - Jerry O'Neil, #59 - Andy Belmont, #90 - Chuck Bown, #0 - Delma Cowart, #35 - Bill Venturini

- This race was marred by the death of Clifford Allison, younger brother of Davey Allison, who was killed in a practice crash for the NASCAR Busch Series race. Despite the tragedy, Davey decided to race. He qualified third and finished fifth in a courageous effort.
- This was Harry Gant's last Winston Cup victory, and the last NASCAR victory for Oldsmobile.
- At the age of 52 years and 219 days, Gant became the oldest race winner in NASCAR Cup Series history. A record that still stands as of 2026.
- Bill Elliott's championship lead grew from 17 points to 37 after he led a race-high 72 of 200 laps.
- What had been a frustrating second half of 1992 continued for Dale Earnhardt, who was forced to start from the back of the field after failing inspection during the second round of qualifying. Earnhardt would recover to finish 16th.

=== Bud 500 ===
The Bud 500 was held Saturday night, August 29 at Bristol International Raceway. Ernie Irvan won the pole.

Top-ten results:

1. #17 - Darrell Waltrip*
2. #3 - Dale Earnhardt
3. #25 - Ken Schrader
4. #42 - Kyle Petty
5. #7 - Alan Kulwicki -1 lap
6. #11 - Bill Elliott* -1 lap
7. #66 - Jimmy Hensley -1 lap
8. #5 - Ricky Rudd -1 lap
9. #26 - Brett Bodine -1 lap
10. #2 - Rusty Wallace* -2 laps

Failed to qualify: #77 - Mike Potter

- This was the first race at Bristol with the new concrete surface.
- This was Darrell Waltrip's 12th and final victory at Bristol.
- Waltrip won this race four days after the birth of his second daughter, Sarah.
- Bill Elliott finished 6th while Davey Allison crashed out and finished 30th, extending Elliott's championship lead to 109 points over Allison.
- With his 10th-place finish, Rusty Wallace would begin a Modern Era Record of consecutive top-10 finishes on short tracks, a streak that would go all the way into 1995.

=== Mountain Dew Southern 500 ===
The Mountain Dew Southern 500 was held September 6 at Darlington Raceway. Sterling Marlin won the pole position.

Top-ten results:

1. #17 - Darrell Waltrip*
2. #6 - Mark Martin
3. #11 - Bill Elliott
4. #26 - Brett Bodine
5. #28 - Davey Allison*
6. #18 - Dale Jarrett
7. #42 - Kyle Petty
8. #7 - Alan Kulwicki
9. #2 - Rusty Wallace
10. #5 - Ricky Rudd -1 lap

Failed to qualify: none

- This race was shortened to 298 laps of 367 due to rain.
- Davey Allison entered this race with a chance to win the Winston Million should he win this race. With rain coming, Allison pitted from the lead on lap 286, with Mark Martin pitting three laps later. It started raining on lap 295. Darrell Waltrip, Bill Elliott, and Brett Bodine were among a handful of drivers who had not yet pitted. When the red flag was displayed on lap 298, Waltrip was scored as the leader, having taken the lead on lap 293. Shortly thereafter, the race was called and Waltrip was declared the winner.
- Despite losing the Winston Million, Allison would win the $100,000 bonus from Winston for winning two out of four crown jewel races. Allison also lost ground to Elliott in the season standings. Elliott now led by 119 points over Allison. Alan Kulwicki was still in striking distance at 161 points behind.
- In his 2002 autobiography, The Big Picture: My Life from Pit Road to the Broadcast Booth, Larry McReynolds wrote about the pit miscue for Allison. He sent a crew member to the NASCAR hauler to look at the weather radar, and the crew member gave McReynolds the call to pit the car on lap 286. According to the book, the crew member said "Green means good," with McReynolds responding, "Green means rain." This incident heavily influenced McReynolds when he began his broadcasting career, even making an appearance on The Weather Channel in 2001.
- In the thick of the 1992 election season, Bill Clinton was the grand marshal for this race.
- This was Darrell Waltrip's 84th and final Winston Cup victory.
- This was the first time since 1983 that Waltrip won back-to-back races in a season.
- Dale Earnhardt would once again be plagued with mechanical issues, this time problems with the clutch early. The clutch would be fixed; but Earnhardt would finish in 29th place, 57 laps down and the lowest finishing car still running in the race.

=== Miller Genuine Draft 400 ===
The Miller Genuine Draft 400 was held Saturday night, September 12 at Richmond International Raceway. Ernie Irvan won the pole.

Top-ten results:

1. #2 - Rusty Wallace*
2. #6 - Mark Martin
3. #17 - Darrell Waltrip
4. #3 - Dale Earnhardt
5. #15 - Geoff Bodine
6. #5 - Ricky Rudd
7. #21 - Morgan Shepherd
8. #33 - Harry Gant
9. #25 - Ken Schrader
10. #55 - Ted Musgrave

Failed to qualify: #48 - James Hylton, #77 - Mike Potter

- This was Wallace's first victory with new crew chief Buddy Parrott.
- Despite finishing one lap down in 14th, points leader Bill Elliott still finished ahead of Alan Kulwicki and Davey Allison, further extending Elliott's points lead to 124 points over Allison, and 164 over Kulwicki.

=== Peak Antifreeze 500 ===
The Peak Antifreeze 500 was held September 20 at Dover Downs International Speedway. Alan Kulwicki won the pole.

Top-ten results:

1. #5 - Ricky Rudd*
2. #11 - Bill Elliott*
3. #42 - Kyle Petty
4. #28 - Davey Allison -1 lap
5. #21 - Morgan Shepherd -2 laps
6. #33 - Harry Gant -3 laps
7. #94 - Terry Labonte -4 laps
8. #55 - Ted Musgrave -4 laps
9. #10 - Derrike Cope -5 laps
10. #68 - Bobby Hamilton -8 laps

Failed to qualify: none

- Despite dominating the race, late pit stop strategy cost Bill Elliott the victory. While battling Ricky Rudd for the lead, Elliott pitted first, taking four tires and fuel. Rudd pitted for fuel only, and came out with a 9-second lead over Elliott. Rudd held on to win by 0.5 seconds.
- Rudd's victory extended his streak of consecutive Cup seasons with a race victory to 10.
- Bill Elliott led the most laps and extended his point lead over Davey Allison to 154 points, the highest margin of the season.
- Polesitter Alan Kulwicki crashed out of the race on lap 91, finishing 34th and leaving him 278 points out of the lead with six races left.

=== Goody's 500 ===
The Goody's 500 was scheduled to be held Sunday, September 27 at Martinsville Speedway but rain delayed the race from both starting and finishing until Monday, September 28. Kyle Petty won the pole.

Top-ten results:

1. #15 - Geoff Bodine
2. #2 - Rusty Wallace
3. #26 - Brett Bodine
4. #42 - Kyle Petty
5. #7 - Alan Kulwicki
6. #8 - Dick Trickle
7. #22 - Sterling Marlin
8. #6 - Mark Martin -1 lap
9. #1 - Rick Mast -1 lap
10. #5 - Ricky Rudd -1 lap

Failed to qualify: #45 - Rich Bickle, #32 - Jimmy Horton, #52 - Jimmy Means

- Championship leader Bill Elliott finished 30th due to engine failure on lap 158. Davey Allison ran in the top 5 until his brakes failed in the final 50 laps; he finished 4 laps down in 16th, reducing Elliott's lead to 112 points.
- Kyle Petty, who finished fourth, actually got stuck in the mud and lost two laps at one point.
- Dale Earnhardt blew an engine on lap 111, scoring his third last-place finish of the season.

=== Tyson Holly Farms 400 ===
The Tyson Holly Farms 400 was scheduled to be held Sunday, October 4 at North Wilkesboro Speedway but as a result of rain, the race was postponed, then started and completed on Monday, October 5 (the second week in a row that this occurred). Alan Kulwicki won the pole.

Top-ten results:

1. #15 - Geoff Bodine*
2. #6 - Mark Martin
3. #42 - Kyle Petty -1 lap
4. #2 - Rusty Wallace -1 lap
5. #22 - Sterling Marlin -1 lap
6. #4 - Ernie Irvan -1 lap
7. #26 - Brett Bodine -2 laps
8. #94 - Terry Labonte -2 laps
9. #17 - Darrell Waltrip -3 laps
10. #18 - Dale Jarrett -3 laps

Failed to qualify: #52 - Jimmy Means

- Bodine's victory allowed Ford to clinch their first manufacturer's championship since 1969. It was also the first time a brand other than a General Motors product won the manufacturer's title since Dodge in 1975.
- Due to the race running caution-free, only two cars finished on the lead lap. However, Bodine won by only 5.3 seconds. As of 2026, this would be the last time ever that a NASCAR short track event race would go flag to flag green.
- Bill Elliott suffered another poor finish, finishing 8 laps down in 26th. Davey Allison was 3 laps down in 11th, reducing Elliott's championship lead to 67 points with 4 races to go.

=== Mello Yello 500 ===
The Mello Yello 500 was held October 11 at Charlotte Motor Speedway. Alan Kulwicki won the pole.

Top-ten results:

1. #6 - Mark Martin*
2. #7 - Alan Kulwicki*
3. #42 - Kyle Petty
4. #12 - Jimmy Spencer
5. #5 - Ricky Rudd
6. #4 - Ernie Irvan
7. #25 - Ken Schrader
8. #33 - Harry Gant
9. #8 - Dick Trickle -1 lap
10. #15 - Geoff Bodine -1 lap

Failed to qualify: #77 - Mike Potter, #05 - Ed Ferree, #85 - Mike Skinner, #82 - Mark Stahl, #48 - James Hylton

- Mark Martin called this "the most important victory of his career." Martin led 107 laps en route to victory, which suddenly vaulted him back into contention for the 1992 Winston Cup title.
- The #31 Team Ireland Chevrolet of Bobby Hillin Jr. was disqualified due to illegal cylinder heads after finishing 15th. As a result, the team withdrew from the series in an attempt to avoid being drawn into disrepute. It would be the last time a Cup driver was disqualified for illegal parts until NASCAR introduced a new disqualification policy for technical inspection failures in 2019.
- Bill Elliott's anti-roll bar broke after 310 laps, leaving Bill with a 30th-place finish. Junior Johnson entered a third car driven by Hut Stricklin, who retired the car when Elliott had his problem. Stricklin's 31st-place finish saved Elliott 3 points.
- Davey Allison also struggled, finishing 5 laps down in 19th, but still managed to further reduce Elliott's points lead to just 39 points.
- Kulwicki would finish second despite breaking a gearbox that forced him to finish the race in fourth gear. Kulwicki's strong finish put him 47 points behind Elliott.

=== AC Delco 500 ===
The AC Delco 500 was held October 25 at Rockingham Speedway. Kyle Petty won the pole.

Top-ten results:

1. #42 - Kyle Petty*
2. #4 - Ernie Irvan
3. #5 - Ricky Rudd
4. #11 - Bill Elliott*
5. #22 - Sterling Marlin
6. #33 - Harry Gant
7. #26 - Brett Bodine
8. #3 - Dale Earnhardt
9. #94 - Terry Labonte
10. #28 - Davey Allison

Failed to qualify: #48 - James Hylton

- Kyle Petty won in absolute dominating fashion, leading all but eight of the 492 laps. He only relinquished the lead during green flag pit stops.
- Only time in his career that Kyle Petty won multiple races in a season.
- Bill Elliott scored a much-needed 4th after 3 consecutive finishes of 26th or worse, extending his points lead to 70.
- For this race and the following week's Pyroil 500K, TNN had a promotion as part of their encouraging viewers to vote in the 1992 elections, where viewers could call a 1-800 number and respond which of the drivers contending for the 1992 Winston Cup championship would win.

=== Pyroil 500K ===
The Pyroil 500K was held November 1 at Phoenix International Raceway. Rusty Wallace won the pole.

Top-ten results:

1. #28 - Davey Allison*
2. #6 - Mark Martin
3. #17 - Darrell Waltrip
4. #7 - Alan Kulwicki
5. #12 - Jimmy Spencer
6. #25 - Ken Schrader
7. #10 - Derrike Cope
8. #68 - Bobby Hamilton
9. #22 - Sterling Marlin
10. #3 - Dale Earnhardt

Failed to qualify: #86 - Rich Woodland Jr., #58 - Wayne Jacks

- Bill Elliott's car suffered from a cracked cylinder head and overheating problems, which relegated him to a 31st-place finish, his 4th sub-26th-place finish in the last five races, and dropping him from 1st to 3rd in the points standings.
- Davey Allison patiently made his way to the front and won his second consecutive Pyroil 500. This victory, Allison's first since the Pocono accident, vaulted him back into the points lead. Alan Kulwicki ran strong all day and finished fourth, also moving him past Elliott in the point standings.
- This would be the last Cup race without Jeff Gordon in the field until the 2016 Daytona 500.
- To mark Richard Petty's penultimate race, both of the cars sponsored by Skoal tobacco; Harry Gant's #33 Oldsmobile and Rick Mast's #1 Oldsmobile sported "Thanks King Richard" messages on their quarterpanels and decklid.

Winston Cup points standings (after 28 of 29 races)
Pos.	Driver	Points	Difference
1	Davey Allison	3928	Leader
2	Alan Kulwicki	3898	-30
3	Bill Elliott	3888	-40
4	Harry Gant	3831	-97
5	Kyle Petty	3830	-98
6	Mark Martin	3815	-113

=== Hooters 500 ===
The Hooters 500 was held November 15 at Atlanta Motor Speedway. Rick Mast won the pole. In what is largely considered one of the greatest NASCAR races of all time, six drivers entered the race with a mathematical chance to win the Winston Cup (Bill Elliott, Alan Kulwicki, Davey Allison, Kyle Petty, Harry Gant and Mark Martin). The race was the highly publicized final career start for 7-time NASCAR champion Richard Petty and, quietly, the first career start for future Cup champion Jeff Gordon. Davey Allison had to finish 6th or better to automatically clinch the championship.

Top-ten results:

1. #11 - Bill Elliott*
2. #7 - Alan Kulwicki*
3. #15 - Geoff Bodine
4. #12 - Jimmy Spencer
5. #94 - Terry Labonte
6. #2 - Rusty Wallace
7. #22 - Sterling Marlin
8. #66 - Jimmy Hensley
9. #55 - Ted Musgrave
10. #18 - Dale Jarrett

Failed to qualify: #77 - Mike Potter, #80 - Dave Blaney, #85 - Mike Skinner, #91 - Kerry Teague, #82 - Mark Stahl, #48 - James Hylton, #50 - Clay Young, #65 - Jerry O'Neil, #91 - T.W. Taylor, #08 - Jeff Fuller

- Rick Mast won his first career Winston Cup pole, but crashed out on lap 2 with Brett Bodine and Hut Stricklin, and did not lead any laps.
- On lap 95, a multi-car crash ensued that collected Richard Petty. The crash knocked the oil cooler off the car and dumped oil on the engine, causing it to erupt in flames. Petty rolled to a stop next to a fire truck, which quickly extinguished the flames.
- Championship contenders Mark Martin and Kyle Petty dropped out with engine trouble while Harry Gant faded and was not a factor in the second half.
- On lap 254, Davey Allison was running sixth when Ernie Irvan had a tire going down, lost control and crashed, collecting Allison. The crash heavily damaged Allison's car, effectively ending his championship run. Elliott and Kulwicki were left to battle for the title. Allison would finish 27th.
- Elliott and Kulwicki ran 1st-2nd for most of the second half, swapping the lead on several occasions. It became evident that the driver who led the most laps (receiving the 5 bonus points for leading the most laps) would clinch the championship. After final pit stops, Kulwicki had led 103 laps. Elliott took over the lead, and led the rest of the way, his fifth victory of the season, bringing his laps led total to 102 laps, one short of Kulwicki's total — giving the 5 bonus points to Kulwicki.
- Kulwicki's second-place finish allowed him to claim the 1992 NASCAR Winston Cup championship by only 10 points, the third-narrowest margin in the Cup Series history. This would be the final time in his career that Bill Elliott would pull off the season sweep at a track.
- Despite the heavy damage, Richard Petty rejoined the field with two laps to go and was running at the finish in 35th in his final race to receive the checkered flag.
- In his Winston Cup debut, Jeff Gordon started 21st, and finished 31st after crashing out.
- This was the last Cup race without Bobby Labonte until the 2013 Quaker State 400.
- Gordon would compete in every single Cup Series event from this race to the end of 2015. He would go on to win 93 races, four championships, and three Daytona 500s. Gordon made 797 consecutive starts, the most of every other driver.
- This would be Oldsmobile's final Cup start, with Harry Gant being the brands top finisher, finishing 13th.

== Final points standings ==
(key) Bold - Pole position awarded by time. Italics - Pole position set by owner's points standings. *- Most laps led.

Pos	Driver	DAY	CAR	RCH	ATL	DAR	BRI	NWS	MAR	TAL	CLT	DOV	SON	POC	MCH	DAY	POC	TAL	GLN	MCH	BRI	DAR	RCH	DOV	MAR	NWS	CLT	CAR	PHO	ATL	Points
1	Alan Kulwicki	4	31	2	7	18	**1***	**7***	16*	6	7	12	14	1*	3	30	3	25	7	**14**	8	8	15	**34**	5	**12**	**2**	12	4	2*	4078
2	Bill Elliott	27	1*	**1***	1	1	20	20	10	2	**14**	13	5*	3	10	5	13	5	14	3*	6	3	14	2*	30	26	30	4	31	1	4068
3	Davey Allison	1*	2	4	4*	4*	28	1	26	1*	4	11	28	5	**1***	10	**33***	3	20	5	30	5	19	4	16	11	19	10	1	27	4015
4	Harry Gant	12	3	3	2	2	29	5	5	24	5	1	17	23	7	23	2	17	18	1	26	16*	8	6	19	13	8	6	14	13	3955
5	Kyle Petty	6	**29**	20	8	27	19	28	18	10	3*	29	12	6	4	14	7	6	1*	6	4	7	12	3	**4**	3	3*	**1***	19	16	3945
6	Mark Martin	29	6	30	**13**	3	15	16	1	8	33	24	3	2	6	8	6	20	4	9	25	2	2	19	8	2	1	30	2	32	3887
7	Ricky Rudd	40	28	6	12	5	6	3	23	26	9	6	**4**	36	5	7	4	4*	13	36	8	10	6	1	10	15	5	3	30	25	3735
8	Terry Labonte	7	7	8	9	9	4	9	4	36	6	21	2	10	38	21	16	18	8	23	31	14	13	7	11	8	12	9	16	5	3674
9	Darrell Waltrip	26	10	5	39	24	25	15	**3**	29	38	5*	8	13	2	13	1	23	12	2	1*	1	3	20	15	9	34	22	3	23	3659
10	Sterling Marlin	**35**	15	7	17	**22**	32	8	2	4	22	14	16	7	32	**2**	11	**2**	16	7	15	**28**	21	33	7	5	16	5	9	7	3603
11	Ernie Irvan	28	11	15	25	26	24	13	25	**5**	2	4	1	19	30	1*	37	1	3*	4	**28**	25	**11**	11	27	6	6	2	34	29	3580
12	Dale Earnhardt	9	24	11	3	10	18	6	9	3	1	2	6	28	9	40	23	40	**9**	16	2	29	4	21	31	19	14	8	10	26	3574
13	Rusty Wallace	31	26	17	15	11	9	2	31	11	18	3	7	24	37	9	18	11	6	21	10	9	1*	16	2*	4	37	21	**28***	6	3556
14	Morgan Shepherd	2	13	10	10	13	7	12	6	9	29	10	29	25	12	19	15	13	2	10	13	31	7	5	21	17	13	13	38	11	3549
15	Brett Bodine	41	8	33	20	6	11	10	8	16	20	**30**	15	8	19	12	8	10	10	12	9	4	18	22	3	7	28	7	12	40	3491
16	Geoff Bodine	3	14	16	6	8	12	4	32	13	32	17	10	14	11	4	30	38	27	40	11	19	5	14	1	1*	10	35	39	3	3437
17	Ken Schrader	37	5	14	41	12	3	22	7	23	26	23	9	**4**	13	6	12	9	21	11	3	13	9	30	13	23	7	32	6	36	3404
18	Ted Musgrave	8	17	25	19	15	14	19	20	21	8	16	22	33	8	16	5	12	11	25	22	30	10	8	12	14	11	29	24	9	3315
19	Dale Jarrett	36	37	13	11	21	2	17	28	7	12	27	39	22	24	3	10	21	15	8	17	6	25	12	23	10	24	15	20	10	3251
20	Dick Trickle	5	36	22	5	7	5	11	17	19	10	9	26	29	20	35	9	28	24	19	23	27	20	27	6	18	9	16	40	37	3097
21	Derrike Cope	34	19	19	14	16	10	14	22	12	17	33	18	12	22	34	19	22	34	33	12	12	35	9	20	22	17	14	7	15	3033
22	Rick Mast	13	12	18	22	17	30	23	14	17	23	32	11	30	28	17	24	26	32	13	29	23	28	24	9	21	35	17	17	**28**	2830
23	Michael Waltrip	18	4	34	28	14	17	29	27	38	25	15	20	15	27	27	26	7	35	22	14	35	33	17	29	16	23	20	11	14	2825
24	Wally Dallenbach Jr.	15	21	24	27	30	22	30	19	14	28	34	25	27	18	11	32	14	5	20	19	24	23	31	14	24	20	23	12	38	2799
25	Bobby Hamilton	32	18	31	24	23	26	27	13	20	21	18	34	17	31	33	22	24	22	15	21	21	32	10	28	31	15	19	8	12	2787
26	Richard Petty	16	16	21	16	32	27	31	29	15	41	20	21	16	15	36	20	15	28	18	16	20	16	28	18	27	27	25	22	35	2731
27	Hut Stricklin	24	9	9	29	29	8	18	11	22	34	7	27	31	35	18	21	16	36	24	27	11	30	15	24	30	31		15	41	2689
28	Jimmy Hensley **(R)**								15	25	11	8	30	9	29	15	14	31	26	29	7	15	17	13	17	25	18	18	21	8	2410
29	Dave Marcis	20	39	28	30	25	31	24	24	27	15	25	23	18	36	32	31	29	17	32	32	18	24	26	25	28	39	38	35	22	2348
30	Greg Sacks	14	34	32	31	28	13	21	12	35	16	19	43	11	14	26	29	19	31	41								33			1759
31	Chad Little	39	22	23	23	33	23					26		37	21	24	17	8		17		34	27	29			33	24		17	1669
32	Jimmy Means	DNQ	33	35	38	20		32	30	34	42	31		35	23	39	39	32		39	24	22	29	23	DNQ	DNQ	38	26		21	1531
33	Jimmy Spencer	DNQ	20	12	37	36	DNQ	26	DNQ	32	27				DNQ						20						4	11	5	4	1284
34	Bobby Hillin Jr.	38			21	DNQ		25		28	13				17	25	25	QL	23	26		17					40			30	1135
35	Stanley Smith	22	32	27	32	DNQ				33	30				40	22		27		35			34				36		32	39	959
36	Mike Potter	30			DNQ	31				DNQ	DNQ	28		20	33		27		33	30	DNQ	33	DNQ	25			DNQ	39		DNQ	806
37	Jim Sauter	DNQ									37				39						18	36	26	18	22	29	21				729
38	Lake Speed	DNQ			34	DNQ					19						36			34		26					26	36	18	18	726
39	Jimmy Horton				26			DNQ				22		34	26		34			38			31		DNQ			34		24	660
40	Bob Schacht **(R)**	42			42	19				30	31						38		30									22		33	611
41	Charlie Glotzbach			26	18					37	36				16	20		30													592
42	James Hylton	DNQ				39		DNQ		DNQ	DNQ			26	25	DNQ	40	DNQ	39	DNQ		37	DNQ	35			DNQ	DNQ		DNQ	476
43	Andy Belmont **(R)**	DNQ	38	DNQ								37		40	34	31	28	39		DNQ		32									467
44	Jeff Purvis																			27			22	32	26	32			36		453
45	Dave Mader III **(R)**	DNQ			QL	34	16	DNQ	21	18	39																				436
46	Jerry O'Neil											36		21			35		25	DNQ							29	37		DNQ	429
47	Eddie Bierschwale	DNQ			40	DNQ			DNQ	DNQ	DNQ					38				28										19	277
48	Buddy Baker	11			36	DNQ				31					DNQ																255
49	Rich Bickle																								DNQ	20	25			34	252
50	Mike Wallace	DNQ			33																							27		20	249
51	Jerry Hill		27			35						38		38																	238
52	John McFadden		40			37				40												38						40			230
53	Phil Parsons	10	30																												207
54	Delma Cowart	25	35							DNQ	DNQ					DNQ	DNQ	37		DNQ											198
55	Phil Barkdoll	17								DNQ	DNQ					28															191
56	Bill Sedgwick												19																27		188
57	Bobby Gerhart													32		37		34													180
58	Brad Teague	DNQ					21									29															176
59	Mike Skinner	DNQ	23		DNQ	DNQ					DNQ						41										DNQ	28		DNQ	173
60	John Krebs												31																23		164
61	Dorsey Schroeder	19			35																										164
62	Randy Porter			DNQ							24					DNQ	DNQ	33													155
63	Bill Schmitt												24																33		155
64	Ron Hornaday Jr.												32																25		155
65	Butch Gilliland												38																29		125
66	Tommy Kendall												13																		124
67	Kerry Teague	33				38																								DNQ	113
68	Stan Fox																	36		37											107
69	Scott Sharp																		19												106
70	A. J. Foyt	21																													100
71	Graham Taylor											40												36							98
72	Rick Scribner												36																41		95
73	Rick Wilson	23																													94
74	Rick Carelli												37																42		89
75	Randy Baker		25			DNQ																									88
76	Jeff Davis																												26		85
77	Ed Ferree																		29								DNQ				76
78	Jeff Fuller			29																										DNQ	76
79	Dave Blaney																											31		DNQ	70
80	Jeff Gordon																													31	70
81	Jeff McClure																			31											70
82	Pancho Carter																										32				67
83	R. K. Smith												33																		64
84	T. W. Taylor																	35												DNQ	58
85	Joe Ruttman										35																				58
86	Mike Chase												35																		58
87	Todd Bodine																		37												52
88	Scott Gaylord																												37		52
89	Denny Wilson																		38												49
90	Mark Thompson					DNQ								39																	46
91	D. K. Ulrich											39																			46
92	Clay Young	DNQ			DNQ					39																				DNQ	46
93	Gary Balough										40																				43
94	Jack Sellers												40																		43
95	H. B. Bailey														41					DNQ											40
96	Irv Hoerr												41																		40
97	Hershel McGriff												42																		37
98	Joe Booher	DNQ																													
99	Mark Gibson	DNQ																													
100	Ben Hess	DNQ													Wth																
101	Kenny Wallace					DNQ																									
102	Bobby Woods												DNQ																		
103	Wayne Jacks												DNQ																DNQ		
104	Bill Venturini														DNQ					DNQ											
105	Tom Rotsell																		DNQ												
106	Chuck Bown																			DNQ											
107	Mark Stahl																										DNQ				
108	Rich Woodland Jr.																												DNQ		
109	Dave Pletcher	Wth																													
Pos	Driver	DAY	CAR	RCH	ATL	DAR	BRI	NWS	MAR	TAL	CLT	DOV	SON	POC	MCH	DAY	POC	TAL	GLN	MCH	BRI	DAR	RCH	DOV	MAR	NWS	CLT	CAR	PHO	ATL	Points

== Other information ==
- Dale Earnhardt and Rusty Wallace both failed to finish in the top 10 in points for 1992. Earnhardt, who was the defending Winston Cup champion for the last 2 years (1990 and 1991), tried to join Cale Yarborough by winning 3 championships in a row, but he had a very disappointing season. He only scored one win, and he finished 12th in points. Wallace had a very disappointing season as well. He too scored only one win, and he finished 13th in points. The next season however, both Earnhardt and Wallace rebounded, and they finished 1st and 2nd in the standings. Earnhardt would win his 6th championship that year with 6 wins, and Wallace would finish 2nd with 10 wins. Earnhardt would win the championship by 80 points over Wallace.
- Two cars numbered 24 were fielded during the season; Butch Gilliland used the number in a car owned by himself at Phoenix and Jeff Gordon drove the number 24 in his first race car with Hendrick Motorsports. The 1993 Winston Cup Series Media Guide shows that Butch Gilliland also fielded the No. 24 Aneheim Elect. Gear Pontiac in the Sonoma race in June 1992 finishing 38th after starting 36th. However, as the Phoenix and Sonoma races were declared combination races with the Winston West Series would run joint races together, Gilliland was registered with the West Series, a developmental series since 2003.
- This was the final year in NASCAR for the Oldsmobile brand.

== Rookie of the Year ==
Jimmy Hensley, driving Cale Yarborough's No. 66 Ford, was named Rookie of the Year after posting four top-ten finishes in 22 starts. Veteran Chad Little drove the car in the first six races, but was replaced by Bobby Hillin Jr. at North Wilkesboro and by Hensley in the following race at Martinsville. Hensley had previously never started more than 4 Winston Cup races in a season (doing so in 1984 and in 1991). Bob Schacht, Andy Belmont, and Dave Mader III were also declared for the award, but did not run enough races to compete for the award.

== See also ==
- 1992 NASCAR Busch Series
- 1992 NASCAR Winston West Series
