= 1992 TranSouth 500 =

Fifth race of the 1992 NASCAR Winston Cup Series

Race details
- Race 5 of 29 in the 1992 NASCAR Winston Cup Series
- The 1992 TranSouth 500 program cover, featuring Ricky Rudd.
- Date: March 29, 1992
- Official name: 36th Annual TranSouth 500
- Location: Darlington, South Carolina, Darlington Raceway
- Course: Permanent racing facility
- Course length: 1.366 miles (2.198 km)
- Distance: 367 laps, 501.322 mi (806.799 km)
- Scheduled distance: 367 laps, 501.322 mi (806.799 km)
- Average speed: 139.364 miles per hour (224.285 km/h)

Pole position
Driver	Sterling Marlin	Junior Johnson & Associates
- Time: 30.157

Most laps led
Driver	Davey Allison	Robert Yates Racing
- Laps: 160

Winner
No. 11	Bill Elliott	Junior Johnson & Associates

Television in the United States
- Network: ESPN
- Announcers: Bob Jenkins, Ned Jarrett, Benny Parsons

Radio in the United States
- Radio: Motor Racing Network

The 1992 TranSouth 500 was the fifth stock car race of the 1992 NASCAR Winston Cup Series season and the 36th iteration of the event. The race was held on Sunday, March 29, 1992, in Darlington, South Carolina, at Darlington Raceway, a 1.366 miles (2.198 km) permanent egg-shaped oval racetrack. The race took the scheduled 367 laps to complete. In the final stages of the race, Junior Johnson & Associates driver Bill Elliott would make a late-race charge for the lead, passing for the lead with 45 to go to take his 38th career NASCAR Winston Cup Series victory, his fourth victory of the season, and his fourth consecutive victory.

== Background ==
The layout of Darlington Raceway, the venue where the race was held.

Darlington Raceway is a race track built for NASCAR racing located near Darlington, South Carolina. It is nicknamed "The Lady in Black" and "The Track Too Tough to Tame" by many NASCAR fans and drivers and advertised as "A NASCAR Tradition." It is of a unique, somewhat egg-shaped design, an oval with the ends of very different configurations, a condition which supposedly arose from the proximity of one end of the track to a minnow pond the owner refused to relocate. This situation makes it very challenging for the crews to set up their cars' handling in a way that is effective at both ends.

=== Entry list ===
- (R) denotes rookie driver.

#	Driver	Team	Make
1	Rick Mast	Precision Products Racing	Oldsmobile
2	Rusty Wallace	Penske Racing South	Pontiac
3	Dale Earnhardt	Richard Childress Racing	Chevrolet
4	Ernie Irvan	Morgan–McClure Motorsports	Chevrolet
5	Ricky Rudd	Hendrick Motorsports	Chevrolet
6	Mark Martin	Roush Racing	Ford
7	Alan Kulwicki	AK Racing	Ford
8	Dick Trickle	Stavola Brothers Racing	Ford
9	Dave Mader III	Melling Racing	Ford
10	Derrike Cope	Whitcomb Racing	Chevrolet
11	Bill Elliott	Junior Johnson & Associates	Ford
12	Hut Stricklin	Bobby Allison Motorsports	Chevrolet
15	Geoff Bodine	Bud Moore Engineering	Ford
16	Wally Dallenbach Jr.	Roush Racing	Ford
17	Darrell Waltrip	Darrell Waltrip Motorsports	Chevrolet
18	Dale Jarrett	Joe Gibbs Racing	Chevrolet
21	Morgan Shepherd	Wood Brothers Racing	Ford
22	Sterling Marlin	Junior Johnson & Associates	Ford
25	Ken Schrader	Hendrick Motorsports	Chevrolet
26	Brett Bodine	King Racing	Ford
28	Davey Allison	Robert Yates Racing	Ford
30	Michael Waltrip	Bahari Racing	Pontiac
33	Harry Gant	Leo Jackson Motorsports	Oldsmobile
41	Greg Sacks	Larry Hedrick Motorsports	Chevrolet
42	Kyle Petty	SABCO Racing	Pontiac
43	Richard Petty	Petty Enterprises	Pontiac
48	James Hylton	Hylton Motorsports	Pontiac
52	Jimmy Means	Jimmy Means Racing	Pontiac
53	John McFadden	Jimmy Means Racing	Pontiac
55	Ted Musgrave	RaDiUs Motorsports	Oldsmobile
56	Jerry Hill	Hill Motorsports	Pontiac
66	Chad Little	Cale Yarborough Motorsports	Ford
68	Bobby Hamilton	TriStar Motorsports	Oldsmobile
71	Dave Marcis	Marcis Auto Racing	Chevrolet
77	Mike Potter	Balough Racing	Chevrolet
90	Kerry Teague	Donlavey Racing	Ford
94	Terry Labonte	Hagan Racing	Oldsmobile
95	Bob Schacht (R)	Sadler Brothers Racing	Oldsmobile
98	Jimmy Spencer	Travis Carter Enterprises	Chevrolet

== Qualifying ==
Qualifying was split into two rounds. The first round was held on Friday, March 27, at 3:00 PM EST. Each driver would have one lap to set a time. During the first round, the top 20 drivers in the round would be guaranteed a starting spot in the race. If a driver was not able to guarantee a spot in the first round, they had the option to scrub their time from the first round and try and run a faster lap time in a second round qualifying run, held on Saturday, March 28, at 11:30 AM EST. As with the first round, each driver would have one lap to set a time. For this specific race, positions 21-40 would be decided on time, and depending on who needed it, a select amount of positions were given to cars who had not otherwise qualified but were high enough in owner's points; which was usually two. If needed, a past champion who did not qualify on either time or provisionals could use a champion's provisional, adding one more spot to the field.

Sterling Marlin, driving for Junior Johnson & Associates, won the pole, setting a time of 30.157 and an average speed of 163.067 mph (262.431 km/h) in the first round.

No drivers would fail to qualify.

=== Full qualifying results ===
Pos.	#	Driver	Team	Make	Time	Speed
1	22	Sterling Marlin	Junior Johnson & Associates	Ford	30.157	163.067
2	11	Bill Elliott	Junior Johnson & Associates	Ford	30.188	162.899
3	4	Ernie Irvan	Morgan–McClure Motorsports	Chevrolet	30.227	162.689
4	26	Brett Bodine	King Racing	Ford	30.278	162.415
5	28	Davey Allison	Robert Yates Racing	Ford	30.280	162.404
6	17	Darrell Waltrip	Darrell Waltrip Motorsports	Chevrolet	30.354	162.008
7	41	Greg Sacks	Larry Hedrick Motorsports	Chevrolet	30.401	161.758
8	3	Dale Earnhardt	Richard Childress Racing	Chevrolet	30.451	161.492
9	18	Dale Jarrett	Joe Gibbs Racing	Chevrolet	30.465	161.418
10	9	Dave Mader III	Melling Racing	Ford	30.480	161.339
11	33	Harry Gant	Leo Jackson Motorsports	Oldsmobile	30.492	161.275
12	15	Geoff Bodine	Bud Moore Engineering	Ford	30.495	161.259
13	21	Morgan Shepherd	Wood Brothers Racing	Ford	30.505	161.206
14	6	Mark Martin	Roush Racing	Ford	30.528	161.085
15	25	Ken Schrader	Hendrick Motorsports	Chevrolet	30.559	160.921
16	8	Dick Trickle	Stavola Brothers Racing	Ford	30.566	160.885
17	42	Kyle Petty	SABCO Racing	Pontiac	30.576	160.832
18	5	Ricky Rudd	Hendrick Motorsports	Chevrolet	30.634	160.528
19	2	Rusty Wallace	Penske Racing South	Pontiac	30.640	160.496
20	68	Bobby Hamilton	TriStar Motorsports	Oldsmobile	30.674	160.318
Failed to lock in Round 1
21	94	Terry Labonte	Hagan Racing	Oldsmobile	30.437	161.567
22	55	Ted Musgrave	RaDiUs Motorsports	Pontiac	30.472	161.381
23	12	Hut Stricklin	Bobby Allison Motorsports	Chevrolet	30.588	160.769
24	30	Michael Waltrip	Bahari Racing	Pontiac	30.655	160.418
25	7	Alan Kulwicki	AK Racing	Ford	30.692	160.224
26	10	Derrike Cope	Whitcomb Racing	Chevrolet	30.728	160.036
27	1	Rick Mast	Precision Products Racing	Oldsmobile	30.729	160.031
28	98	Jimmy Spencer	Travis Carter Enterprises	Chevrolet	30.772	159.808
29	66	Chad Little	Cale Yarborough Motorsports	Ford	30.784	159.745
30	43	Richard Petty	Petty Enterprises	Pontiac	31.036	158.448
31	16	Wally Dallenbach Jr.	Roush Racing	Ford	31.091	158.168
32	95	Bob Schacht (R)	Sadler Brothers Racing	Oldsmobile	31.464	156.293
33	71	Dave Marcis	Marcis Auto Racing	Chevrolet	31.556	155.837
34	52	Jimmy Means	Jimmy Means Racing	Pontiac	31.952	153.906
35	53	John McFadden	Jimmy Means Racing	Pontiac	32.201	152.716
36	77	Mike Potter	Balough Racing	Chevrolet	32.428	151.647
37	90	Kerry Teague	Donlavey Racing	Ford	34.094	144.237
38	48	James Hylton	Hylton Motorsports	Pontiac	34.362	143.112
39	56	Jerry Hill	Hill Motorsports	Pontiac	-	-
Official first round qualifying results
Official starting lineup

== Race results ==
Fin	St	#	Driver	Team	Make	Laps	Led	Status	Pts	Winnings
1	2	11	Bill Elliott	Junior Johnson & Associates	Ford	367	93	running	180	$64,290
2	11	33	Harry Gant	Leo Jackson Motorsports	Oldsmobile	367	88	running	175	$40,715
3	14	6	Mark Martin	Roush Racing	Ford	367	0	running	165	$29,375
4	5	28	Davey Allison	Robert Yates Racing	Ford	366	160	running	170	$35,315
5	18	5	Ricky Rudd	Hendrick Motorsports	Chevrolet	366	0	running	155	$21,020
6	4	26	Brett Bodine	King Racing	Ford	366	16	running	155	$16,290
7	16	8	Dick Trickle	Stavola Brothers Racing	Ford	365	0	running	146	$14,160
8	12	15	Geoff Bodine	Bud Moore Engineering	Ford	365	0	running	142	$13,130
9	21	94	Terry Labonte	Hagan Racing	Oldsmobile	365	0	running	138	$13,150
10	8	3	Dale Earnhardt	Richard Childress Racing	Chevrolet	365	0	running	134	$20,570
11	19	2	Rusty Wallace	Penske Racing South	Pontiac	364	0	running	130	$14,665
12	15	25	Ken Schrader	Hendrick Motorsports	Chevrolet	364	0	running	127	$15,435
13	13	21	Morgan Shepherd	Wood Brothers Racing	Ford	364	0	running	124	$11,155
14	24	30	Michael Waltrip	Bahari Racing	Pontiac	363	0	running	121	$10,850
15	22	55	Ted Musgrave	RaDiUs Motorsports	Pontiac	363	0	running	118	$10,745
16	26	10	Derrike Cope	Whitcomb Racing	Chevrolet	362	0	running	115	$9,175
17	27	1	Rick Mast	Precision Products Racing	Oldsmobile	362	0	running	112	$9,720
18	25	7	Alan Kulwicki	AK Racing	Ford	358	6	engine	114	$10,385
19	32	95	Bob Schacht (R)	Sadler Brothers Racing	Oldsmobile	356	2	running	111	$6,500
20	34	52	Jimmy Means	Jimmy Means Racing	Pontiac	347	0	running	103	$7,670
21	9	18	Dale Jarrett	Joe Gibbs Racing	Chevrolet	328	0	running	100	$4,950
22	1	22	Sterling Marlin	Junior Johnson & Associates	Ford	307	0	running	97	$11,555
23	20	68	Bobby Hamilton	TriStar Motorsports	Oldsmobile	306	0	engine	94	$9,460
24	6	17	Darrell Waltrip	Darrell Waltrip Motorsports	Chevrolet	264	0	overheating	91	$13,950
25	33	71	Dave Marcis	Marcis Auto Racing	Chevrolet	260	0	engine	88	$6,120
26	3	4	Ernie Irvan	Morgan–McClure Motorsports	Chevrolet	257	0	head	85	$14,030
27	17	42	Kyle Petty	SABCO Racing	Pontiac	256	0	overheating	82	$7,890
28	7	41	Greg Sacks	Larry Hedrick Motorsports	Chevrolet	249	0	engine	79	$4,230
29	23	12	Hut Stricklin	Bobby Allison Motorsports	Chevrolet	233	2	valve	81	$7,720
30	31	16	Wally Dallenbach Jr.	Roush Racing	Ford	187	0	engine	73	$4,085
31	36	77	Mike Potter	Balough Racing	Chevrolet	183	0	steering	70	$4,025
32	30	43	Richard Petty	Petty Enterprises	Pontiac	161	0	piston	67	$7,540
33	29	66	Chad Little	Cale Yarborough Motorsports	Ford	133	0	valve	64	$5,455
34	10	9	Dave Mader III	Melling Racing	Ford	90	0	engine	61	$7,645
35	39	56	Jerry Hill	Hill Motorsports	Pontiac	31	0	handling	58	$3,860
36	28	98	Jimmy Spencer	Travis Carter Enterprises	Chevrolet	28	0	head	55	$5,825
37	35	53	John McFadden	Jimmy Means Racing	Pontiac	17	0	engine	52	$3,810
38	37	90	Kerry Teague	Donlavey Racing	Ford	15	0	engine	49	$3,790
39	38	48	James Hylton	Hylton Motorsports	Pontiac	7	0	brakes	46	$3,760
Official race results

== Standings after the race ==
Drivers' Championship standings

	Pos	Driver	Points
	1	Davey Allison	865
	2	Bill Elliott	817 (-48)
	3	Harry Gant	812 (-53)
	4	Terry Labonte	715 (–150)
	5	Morgan Shepherd	696 (–169)
1	6	Geoff Bodine	693 (–172)
1	7	Alan Kulwicki	665 (–200)
	8	Dale Earnhardt	658 (–207)
1	9	Dick Trickle	608 (–257)
7	10	Mark Martin	588 (–277)
Official driver's standings

- Note: Only the first 10 positions are included for the driver standings.

Previous race: 1992 Motorcraft Quality Parts 500	NASCAR Winston Cup Series; 1992 season	Next race: 1992 Food City 500
