= 1992 Food City 500 =

Sixth race of the 1992 NASCAR Winston Cup Series

Race details
- Race 6 of 29 in the 1992 NASCAR Winston Cup Series
- The 1992 Food City 500 program cover, featuring Richard Petty and Kyle Petty.
- Date: April 5, 1992
- Official name: 32nd Annual Food City 500
- Location: Bristol, Tennessee, Bristol Motor Speedway
- Course: Permanent racing facility
- Course length: 0.533 miles (0.858 km)
- Distance: 500 laps, 266.5 mi (428.89 km)
- Scheduled distance: 500 laps, 266.5 mi (428.89 km)
- Average speed: 86.316 miles per hour (138.912 km/h)
- Attendance: 62,300

Pole position
Driver	Alan Kulwicki	AK Racing
- Time: 15.667

Most laps led
Driver	Alan Kulwicki	AK Racing
- Laps: 282

Winner
No. 7	Alan Kulwicki	AK Racing

Television in the United States
- Network: ESPN
- Announcers: Bob Jenkins, Ned Jarrett, Benny Parsons

Radio in the United States
- Radio: Motor Racing Network

The 1992 Food City 500 was the sixth stock car race of the 1992 NASCAR Winston Cup Series season and the 32nd iteration of the event. The race was held on Sunday, April 5, 1992, before an audience of 62,300 in Bristol, Tennessee, at Bristol Motor Speedway, a 0.533 miles (0.858 km) permanent oval-shaped racetrack. The race took the scheduled 500 laps to complete. At race's end, Alan Kulwicki, driving for his own AK Racing team, would manage to make a late-race pass for the lead with 27 to go to take his fourth career NASCAR Winston Cup Series victory and his first victory of the season. To fill out the top three, Joe Gibbs Racing driver Dale Jarrett and Hendrick Motorsports driver Ken Schrader would finish second and third, respectively.

== Background ==
The layout of Bristol Motor Speedway, the venue where the race was held.

The Bristol Motor Speedway, formerly known as Bristol International Raceway and Bristol Raceway, is a NASCAR short track venue located in Bristol, Tennessee. Constructed in 1960, it held its first NASCAR race on July 30, 1961. Despite its short length, Bristol is among the most popular tracks on the NASCAR schedule because of its distinct features, which include extraordinarily steep banking, an all concrete surface, two pit roads, and stadium-like seating. It has also been named one of the loudest NASCAR tracks.

=== Entry list ===
- (R) denotes rookie driver.

#	Driver	Team	Make
1	Rick Mast	Precision Products Racing	Oldsmobile
2	Rusty Wallace	Penske Racing South	Pontiac
3	Dale Earnhardt	Richard Childress Racing	Chevrolet
4	Ernie Irvan	Morgan–McClure Motorsports	Chevrolet
5	Ricky Rudd	Hendrick Motorsports	Chevrolet
6	Mark Martin	Roush Racing	Ford
7	Alan Kulwicki	AK Racing	Ford
8	Dick Trickle	Stavola Brothers Racing	Ford
9	Dave Mader III	Melling Racing	Ford
10	Derrike Cope	Whitcomb Racing	Chevrolet
11	Bill Elliott	Junior Johnson & Associates	Ford
12	Hut Stricklin	Bobby Allison Motorsports	Chevrolet
15	Geoff Bodine	Bud Moore Engineering	Ford
16	Wally Dallenbach Jr.	Roush Racing	Ford
17	Darrell Waltrip	Darrell Waltrip Motorsports	Chevrolet
18	Dale Jarrett	Joe Gibbs Racing	Chevrolet
21	Morgan Shepherd	Wood Brothers Racing	Ford
22	Sterling Marlin	Junior Johnson & Associates	Ford
25	Ken Schrader	Hendrick Motorsports	Chevrolet
26	Brett Bodine	King Racing	Ford
28	Davey Allison	Robert Yates Racing	Ford
30	Michael Waltrip	Bahari Racing	Pontiac
33	Harry Gant	Leo Jackson Motorsports	Oldsmobile
41	Greg Sacks	Larry Hedrick Motorsports	Chevrolet
42	Kyle Petty	SABCO Racing	Pontiac
43	Richard Petty	Petty Enterprises	Pontiac
52	Jimmy Means	Jimmy Means Racing	Pontiac
55	Ted Musgrave	RaDiUs Motorsports	Oldsmobile
66	Chad Little	Cale Yarborough Motorsports	Ford
68	Bobby Hamilton	TriStar Motorsports	Oldsmobile
71	Dave Marcis	Marcis Auto Racing	Chevrolet
94	Terry Labonte	Hagan Racing	Oldsmobile
98	Jimmy Spencer	Travis Carter Enterprises	Chevrolet

== Qualifying ==
Qualifying was originally scheduled to be split into two rounds. The first round was held on Friday, April 3, at 2:30 PM EST. Originally, the first 15 positions were going to be determined by first round qualifying, with positions 16-30 meant to be determined the following day on Saturday, April 4. However, due to rain, the second round was cancelled. As a result, the rest of the starting lineup was set using the results from the first round.

Alan Kulwicki, driving for his AK Racing team, won the pole, setting a time of 15.667 and an average speed of 122.474 mph (197.103 km/h).

Jimmy Spencer was the only driver to fail to qualify.

=== Full qualifying results ===
Pos.	#	Driver	Team	Make	Time	Speed
1	7	Alan Kulwicki	AK Racing	Ford	15.667	122.474
2	26	Brett Bodine	King Racing	Ford	15.772	121.659
3	2	Rusty Wallace	Penske Racing South	Pontiac	15.869	120.915
4	18	Dale Jarrett	Joe Gibbs Racing	Chevrolet	15.938	120.392
5	12	Hut Stricklin	Bobby Allison Motorsports	Chevrolet	15.961	120.218
6	28	Davey Allison	Robert Yates Racing	Ford	15.965	120.188
7	4	Ernie Irvan	Morgan–McClure Motorsports	Chevrolet	16.010	119.850
8	25	Ken Schrader	Hendrick Motorsports	Chevrolet	16.038	119.641
9	6	Mark Martin	Roush Racing	Ford	16.046	119.581
10	30	Michael Waltrip	Bahari Racing	Pontiac	16.061	119.470
11	11	Bill Elliott	Junior Johnson & Associates	Ford	16.062	119.462
12	33	Harry Gant	Leo Jackson Motorsports	Oldsmobile	16.068	119.417
13	21	Morgan Shepherd	Wood Brothers Racing	Ford	16.071	119.395
14	43	Richard Petty	Petty Enterprises	Pontiac	16.073	119.380
15	94	Terry Labonte	Hagan Racing	Oldsmobile	16.082	119.314
16	17	Darrell Waltrip	Darrell Waltrip Motorsports	Chevrolet	16.082	119.314
17	5	Ricky Rudd	Hendrick Motorsports	Chevrolet	16.084	119.299
18	3	Dale Earnhardt	Richard Childress Racing	Chevrolet	16.089	119.262
19	22	Sterling Marlin	Junior Johnson & Associates	Ford	16.104	119.151
20	66	Chad Little	Cale Yarborough Motorsports	Ford	16.104	119.151
21	71	Dave Marcis	Marcis Auto Racing	Chevrolet	16.152	118.796
22	8	Dick Trickle	Stavola Brothers Racing	Ford	16.167	118.686
23	42	Kyle Petty	SABCO Racing	Pontiac	16.169	118.672
24	55	Ted Musgrave	RaDiUs Motorsports	Oldsmobile	16.177	118.613
25	9	Dave Mader III	Melling Racing	Ford	16.181	118.584
26	52	Brad Teague	Jimmy Means Racing	Pontiac	16.186	118.547
27	15	Geoff Bodine	Bud Moore Engineering	Ford	16.228	118.240
28	68	Bobby Hamilton	TriStar Motorsports	Oldsmobile	16.238	118.167
29	41	Greg Sacks	Larry Hedrick Motorsports	Chevrolet	16.257	118.029
30	1	Rick Mast	Precision Products Racing	Oldsmobile	16.385	117.107
Provisionals
31	10	Derrike Cope	Whitcomb Racing	Chevrolet	16.440	116.715
32	16	Wally Dallenbach Jr.	Roush Racing	Ford	16.457	116.595
Failed to qualify
33	98	Jimmy Spencer	Travis Carter Enterprises	Chevrolet	16.990	112.937
Official starting lineup

== Race results ==
Fin	St	#	Driver	Team	Make	Laps	Led	Status	Pts	Winnings
1	1	7	Alan Kulwicki	AK Racing	Ford	500	282	running	185	$83,360
2	4	18	Dale Jarrett	Joe Gibbs Racing	Chevrolet	500	38	running	175	$29,835
3	8	25	Ken Schrader	Hendrick Motorsports	Chevrolet	500	20	running	170	$29,410
4	15	94	Terry Labonte	Hagan Racing	Oldsmobile	499	0	running	160	$20,010
5	22	8	Dick Trickle	Stavola Brothers Racing	Ford	499	0	running	155	$18,410
6	17	5	Ricky Rudd	Hendrick Motorsports	Chevrolet	497	0	running	150	$16,485
7	13	21	Morgan Shepherd	Wood Brothers Racing	Ford	496	0	running	146	$13,685
8	5	12	Hut Stricklin	Bobby Allison Motorsports	Chevrolet	495	0	running	142	$13,185
9	3	2	Rusty Wallace	Penske Racing South	Pontiac	494	0	running	138	$15,280
10	31	10	Derrike Cope	Whitcomb Racing	Chevrolet	494	0	running	134	$11,630
11	2	26	Brett Bodine	King Racing	Ford	494	59	running	135	$12,680
12	27	15	Geoff Bodine	Bud Moore Engineering	Ford	494	0	running	127	$11,730
13	29	41	Greg Sacks	Larry Hedrick Motorsports	Chevrolet	492	0	running	124	$6,055
14	24	55	Ted Musgrave	RaDiUs Motorsports	Oldsmobile	492	0	running	121	$11,105
15	9	6	Mark Martin	Roush Racing	Ford	488	0	running	118	$13,905
16	25	9	Dave Mader III	Melling Racing	Ford	487	0	running	115	$11,430
17	10	30	Michael Waltrip	Bahari Racing	Pontiac	478	0	running	112	$10,530
18	18	3	Dale Earnhardt	Richard Childress Racing	Chevrolet	471	28	running	114	$18,130
19	23	42	Kyle Petty	SABCO Racing	Pontiac	471	0	running	106	$10,420
20	11	11	Bill Elliott	Junior Johnson & Associates	Ford	470	0	running	103	$14,230
21	26	52	Brad Teague	Jimmy Means Racing	Pontiac	456	0	running	100	$7,080
22	32	16	Wally Dallenbach Jr.	Roush Racing	Ford	446	0	running	97	$5,280
23	20	66	Chad Little	Cale Yarborough Motorsports	Ford	439	0	running	94	$4,880
24	7	4	Ernie Irvan	Morgan–McClure Motorsports	Chevrolet	415	0	crash	91	$14,755
25	16	17	Darrell Waltrip	Darrell Waltrip Motorsports	Chevrolet	382	23	running	93	$24,505
26	28	68	Bobby Hamilton	TriStar Motorsports	Oldsmobile	379	0	running	85	$10,680
27	14	43	Richard Petty	Petty Enterprises	Pontiac	354	0	running	82	$9,630
28	6	28	Davey Allison	Robert Yates Racing	Ford	335	50	running	84	$15,205
29	12	33	Harry Gant	Leo Jackson Motorsports	Oldsmobile	277	0	engine	76	$14,975
30	30	1	Rick Mast	Precision Products Racing	Oldsmobile	122	0	crash	73	$9,480
31	21	71	Dave Marcis	Marcis Auto Racing	Chevrolet	92	0	engine	70	$6,455
32	19	22	Sterling Marlin	Junior Johnson & Associates	Ford	16	0	crash	67	$9,430
Official race results

== Standings after the race ==
Drivers' Championship standings

	Pos	Driver	Points
	1	Davey Allison	949
	2	Bill Elliott	920 (-29)
	3	Harry Gant	888 (-61)
	4	Terry Labonte	875 (–74)
2	5	Alan Kulwicki	850 (–99)
1	6	Morgan Shepherd	842 (–107)
1	7	Geoff Bodine	820 (–129)
	8	Dale Earnhardt	772 (–177)
	9	Dick Trickle	763 (–186)
	10	Mark Martin	706 (–243)
Official driver's standings

- Note: Only the first 10 positions are included for the driver standings.

Previous race: 1992 TranSouth 500	NASCAR Winston Cup Series; 1992 season	Next race: 1992 First Union 400
