= Randy Porter =

American racing driver

- Born: July 6, 1964 (age 62); Greenville, South Carolina, U.S.

NASCAR Cup Series career
- 2 races run over 1 year
- 1992 position: 62nd
- Best finish: 62nd (1992)
- First race: 1992 Coca-Cola 600 (Charlotte)
- Last race: 1992 DieHard 500 (Talladega)
Wins	Top tens	Poles
0	0	0

NASCAR O'Reilly Auto Parts Series career
- 73 races run over 8 years
- Best finish: 30th (1994)
- First race: 1986 Budweiser 200 (Bristol)
- Last race: 1998 Myrtle Beach 250 (Myrtle Beach)
Wins	Top tens	Poles
0	3	1

NASCAR FedEx Freight Truck Series career
- 1 race run over 1 year
- Best finish: 108th (1996)
- First race: 1996 Sears Auto Center 200 (Milwaukee)
Wins	Top tens	Poles
0	0	0

Randy Porter (born July 6, 1964) is an American retired stock car racing driver. Porter competed 73 NASCAR Busch Series races between 1986 and 1998, achieving three top-ten finishes and one pole position. Porter also competed in two NASCAR Winston Cup Series events in 1992 and one NASCAR Craftsman Truck Series event in 1996.

== Motorsports career results ==
=== NASCAR ===
(key) (Bold – Pole position awarded by qualifying time. Italics – Pole position earned by points standings or practice time. * – Most laps led.)

==== Winston Cup Series ====
NASCAR Winston Cup Series results
Year	Team	No.	Make	1	2	3	4	5	6	7	8	9	10	11	12	13	14	15	16	17	18	19	20	21	22	23	24	25	26	27	28	29	NWCC	Pts	Ref
1992	Porter Racing	32	Pontiac	DAY	CAR	RCH; DNQ	ATL	DAR	BRI	NWS	MAR	TAL	CLT; 24	DOV	SON	POC	MCH	DAY; DNQ	POC; DNQ	TAL; 33	GLN	MCH	BRI	DAR	RCH	DOV	MAR	NWS	CLT	CAR	PHO	ATL	62nd	155	

==== Busch Series ====
NASCAR Busch Series results
Year	Team	No.	Make	1	2	3	4	5	6	7	8	9	10	11	12	13	14	15	16	17	18	19	20	21	22	23	24	25	26	27	28	29	30	31	NBSC	Pts	Ref
1986		36	Pontiac	DAY	CAR	HCY	MAR	BRI; 29	DAR	SBO	LGY	JFC	DOV	CLT	SBO	HCY	ROU	IRP	SBO	RAL															88th	76	
1986		132	Chevy																		**OXF**; 10	SBO	HCY	LGY	ROU	BRI	DAR	RCH	DOV	MAR	ROU	CLT	CAR	MAR	88th	76	
1990	Porter Racing	20	Buick	DAY	RCH	CAR	MAR	HCY	DAR	BRI	LAN; 30	SBO	NZH	HCY	CLT	DOV	ROU	VOL; 20	MYB; 26	OXF	NHA	SBO	DUB	IRP	ROU	BRI	DAR	RCH	DOV	MAR	CLT	NHA	CAR	MAR	64th	261	
1991	Porter Racing	20	Buick	DAY	RCH	CAR	MAR	VOL	HCY	DAR	BRI	LAN; 30	SBO	NZH	CLT	DOV	ROU	HCY	MYB	GLN	OXF	NHA	SBO	DUB	IRP	ROU	BRI	DAR	RCH	DOV	CLT	NHA	CAR	MAR	106th	73	
1994	Laughlin Racing Products	35	Pontiac	DAY; 15	CAR; 39	RCH; 29																													30th	1525	
1994	Laughlin Racing Products	35	Chevy				ATL; 3	MAR; 15	DAR; 25	HCY; DNQ	BRI	ROU; 20	NHA; 26	NZH; 14	CLT; 42	DOV; 25	MYB; 23	GLN; 29	MLW; 25	SBO; 25	TAL; 34	HCY; 30	IRP; DNQ	MCH	BRI	DAR	RCH	DOV	CLT	MAR	CAR				30th	1525	
1995	Porter Racing	48	Ford	DAY	CAR	RCH; 10	ATL	NSV; 33	DAR	BRI	HCY; 22																								39th	994	
1995	Group III Racing	18	Ford									NHA; 36	NZH; 42	CLT; DNQ	DOV; 25	MYB; 14	GLN	MLW; 16	TAL; 42	SBO; 32	IRP; 16	MCH; 33	BRI	DAR	RCH	DOV	CLT	CAR	HOM						39th	994	
1996	Porter Racing	48	Ford	DAY; DNQ	CAR; 42	RCH; 33	ATL; DNQ	NSV; 26	DAR; DNQ	BRI; 30	HCY; 28	NZH; 27	CLT; DNQ	DOV; 28	SBO; 26	MYB; 30	GLN; 37	MLW; 25	NHA; 37	TAL; DNQ	IRP; DNQ	MCH; DNQ	BRI; 15	DAR	RCH; 25	DOV; 23	CLT; DNQ	CAR; 38	HOM; 26						37th	1283	
1997	Porter Racing	48	Ford	DAY	CAR; 24	RCH; 33	ATL	LVS; 19	DAR	HCY; 27	TEX; 39	BRI	NSV; 40	TAL; 32	NHA; 14	NZH	CLT; DNQ	DOV; 29	SBO; DNQ	GLN	MLW; 33			IRP; 23	MCH	BRI; 25	DAR; 38	RCH; DNQ	DOV; 41	CLT	CAL	CAR; 35			38th	1320	
1997	Porter Racing	48	Chevy																			MYB; 23											HOM; 24		38th	1320	
1997	Porter Racing	84	Ford																				GTY; 39												38th	1320	
1998	Porter Racing	48	Ford	DAY	CAR	LVS	NSV; 22	DAR	BRI; 38	TEX	HCY; DNQ	TAL	NHA	NZH	CLT	DOV	RCH	PPR	GLN	MLW	MYB; 34	CAL	SBO	IRP	MCH	BRI	DAR	RCH	DOV	CLT	GTY	CAR	ATL	HOM	74th	207	

==== Craftsman Truck Series ====
NASCAR Craftsman Truck Series results
Year	Team	No.	Make	1	2	3	4	5	6	7	8	9	10	11	12	13	14	15	16	17	18	19	20	21	22	23	24	NCTC	Pts	Ref
1996	MB Motorsports	26	Ford	HOM	PHO	POR	EVG	TUS	CNS	HPT	BRI	NZH	MLW; 22	LVL	I70	IRP	FLM	GLN	NSV	RCH	NHA	MAR	NWS	SON	MMR	PHO	LVS	108th	97	
