= Mike Potter (racing driver) =

American racing driver (1949–2022)

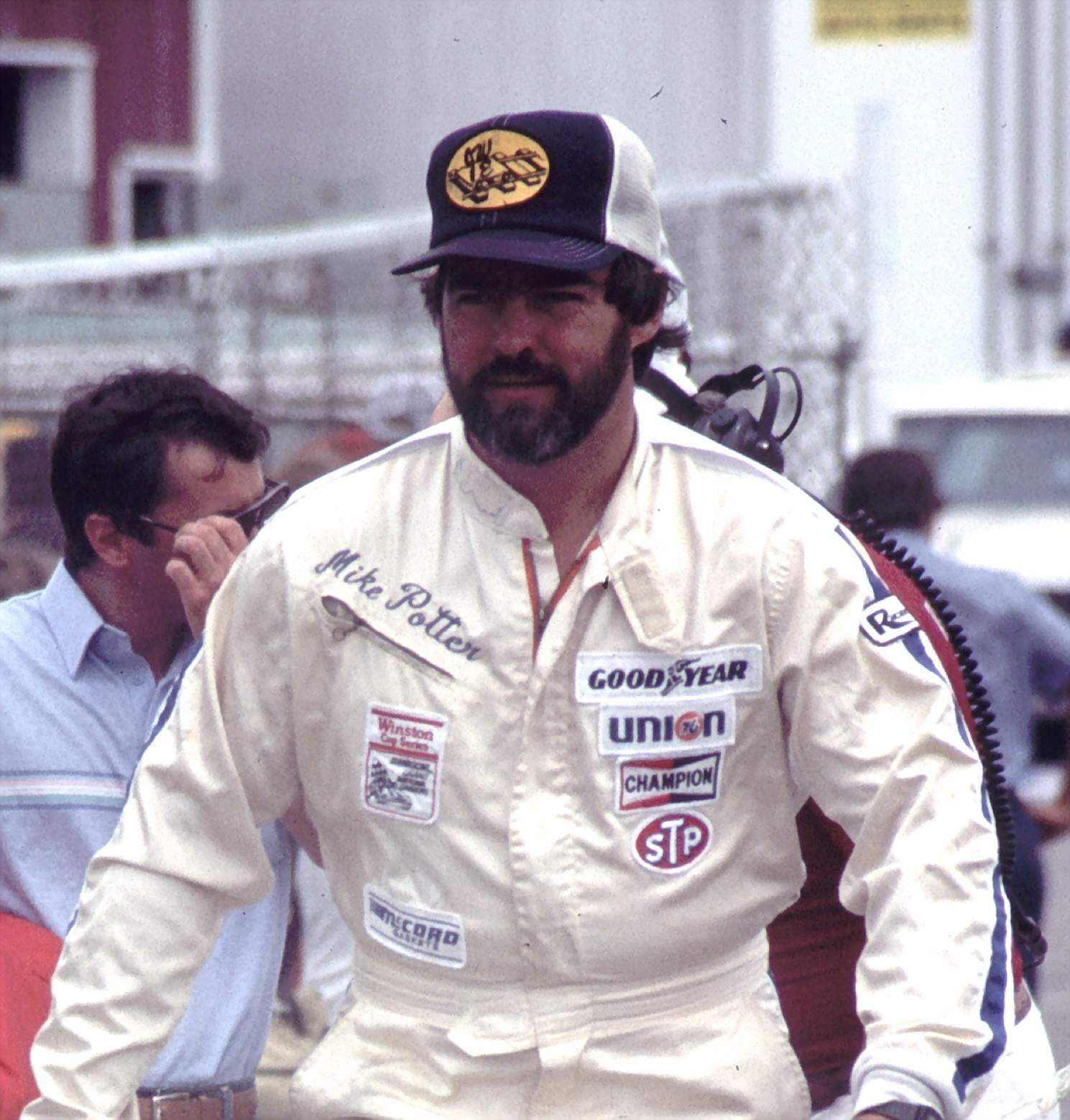
- Potter in 1985
- Born: July 4, 1949; Johnson City, Tennessee, U.S.
- Died: October 31, 2022 (aged 73)

NASCAR Cup Series career
- 60 races run over 14 years
- Best finish: 36th (1992)
- First race: 1979 Southeastern 500 (Bristol)
- Last race: 1993 TranSouth 500 (Darlington)
Wins	Top tens	Poles
0	0	0

NASCAR O'Reilly Auto Parts Series career
- 20 races run over 6 years
- Best finish: 68th (2003)
- First race: 1982 Goody's 300 (Daytona)
- Last race: 2008 Camping World RV Sales 200 (Loudon)
Wins	Top tens	Poles
0	0	0
- Statistics up to date as of December 17, 2012.

Mike Anthony Potter (July 4, 1949 – October 31, 2022) was an American NASCAR driver. He lived in Johnson City, Tennessee.

Over the course of his Winston Cup Series career, Potter raced sixty races. Every season he raced was part-time. The most races he ran in a season was eleven in both 1983 and 1992. 1983 was his official year as a rookie, because he ran more than eight races. His best career finish was a fifteenth at Nashville Speedway in 1981. Potter competed in the 1988 NASCAR Christmas 500 at Australia's Calder Park Thunderdome, finishing 30th. He returned to the track for the 1990 NASCAR Christmas 400, finishing 29th after retiring with mechanical issues 52 laps into the event.

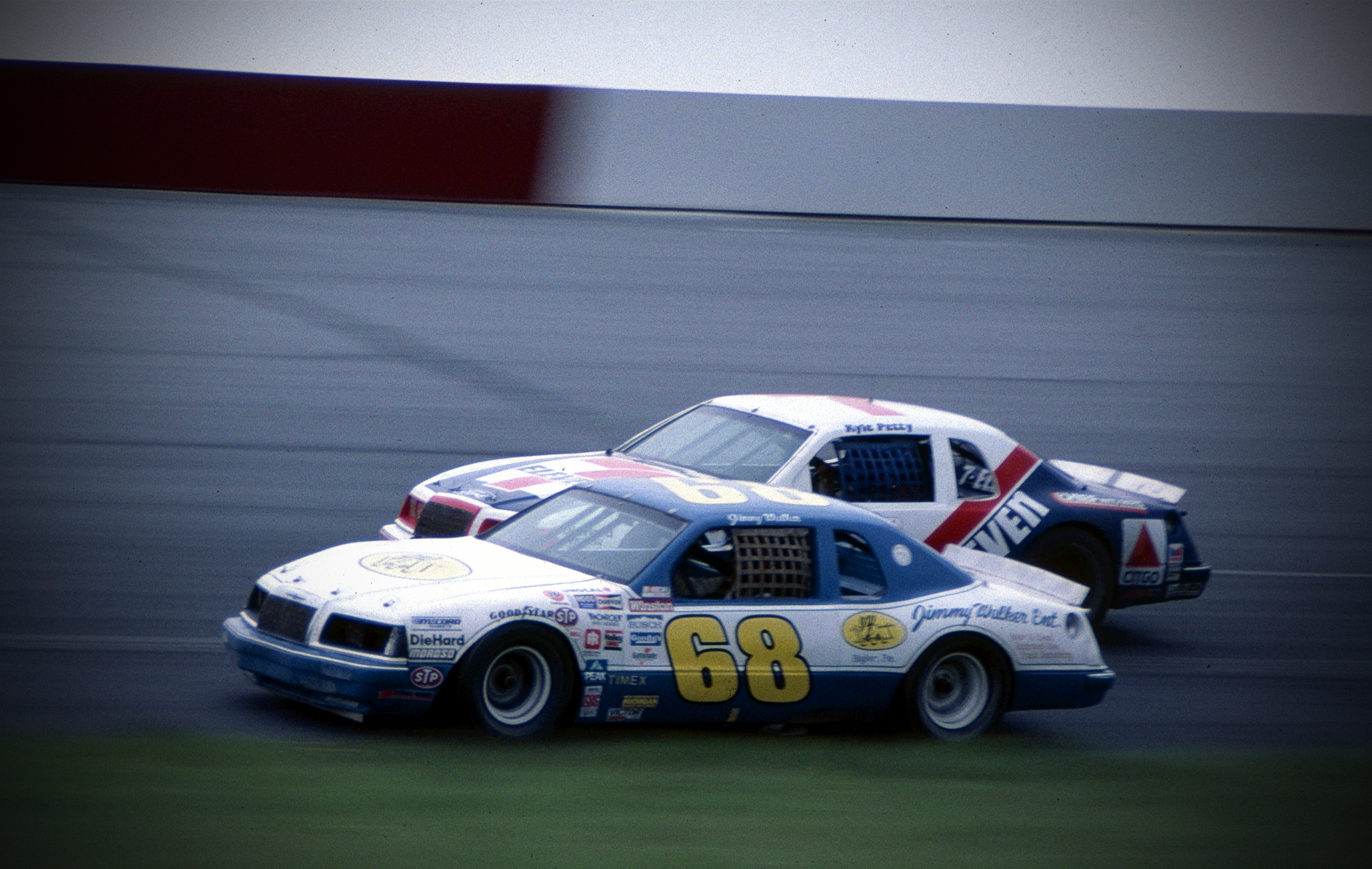
Potter racing in 1985 for Jimmy Walker Enterprises

In the early 2000s, Potter ran a few races in the Busch Series, primarily for Means Racing during 2003. He attempted five races in 2004 for Johnny Davis Motorsports but only made two of them.

Potter returned to the NASCAR Busch Series in 2007. He attempted two races in the No. 00 Chevrolet. The car was a third entry from DDL Motorsports, a team co-owned by Johnny Davis. Potter made the field for Milwaukee, his first race back, but missed the other race he attempted at Watkins Glen.

In 2008, Potter ran a variety of races for Johnny Davis Motorsports. His first race in 2008 was at his home track of Bristol. He ended up finishing last in the No. 0 Chevrolet, a Johnny Davis Motorsports secondary car. After Kertus Davis left the team, Potter took over the reins of the No. 01 SponsorDavis.com Chevrolet, the team's primary entry, for a couple of races. Potter ended up finishing a respectable 29th at the Camping World RV Sells 200 in June.

Besides NASCAR, Potter also had experience in many other forms of stock car racing, including Hooters Pro Cup.

Potter died on October 31, 2022, at the age of 73.

== Motorsports career results ==
=== NASCAR ===
(key) (Bold – Pole position awarded by qualifying time. Italics – Pole position earned by points standings or practice time. * – Most laps led.)

==== Winston Cup Series ====
NASCAR Winston Cup Series results
Year	Team	No.	Make	1	2	3	4	5	6	7	8	9	10	11	12	13	14	15	16	17	18	19	20	21	22	23	24	25	26	27	28	29	30	31	NWCC	Pts	Ref
1979	Potter Racing	76	Chevy	RSD	DAY	CAR	RCH	ATL	NWS	BRI; 16	DAR	MAR	TAL	NSV	DOV	CLT	TWS; 22	RSD	MCH	DAY	NSV	POC	TAL	MCH	BRI; 23	DAR	RCH	DOV	MAR	CLT	NWS	CAR; 35	ATL	ONT	68th	209	
1980	Potter Racing	76	Chevy	RSD	DAY	RCH	CAR; 36	ATL	BRI; 30	DAR	NWS	MAR	TAL	NSV	DOV	CLT	TWS	RSD	MCH; 18	DAY	NSV	POC	TAL	MCH	BRI	DAR	RCH	DOV	NWS	MAR	CLT	CAR	ATL	ONT	64th	237	
1981	Hamby Motorsports	17	Chevy	RSD	DAY	RCH	CAR	ATL	BRI	NWS	DAR; 35	MAR	TAL	NSV; 15	DOV	CLT	TWS	RSD							BRI; 26										92nd	-	
1981	Hamby Motorsports	17	Buick																MCH; 26	DAY	NSV	POC	TAL; 27	MCH		DAR; 28	RCH	DOV	MAR	NWS	CLT	CAR	ATL	RSD	92nd	-	
1982	Hamby Motorsports	66	Buick	DAY	RCH	BRI	ATL	CAR	DAR	NWS	MAR	TAL	NSV	DOV	CLT	POC	RSD	MCH	DAY	NSV	POC; 20	TAL	MCH	BRI											97th	64	
1982	Hamby Motorsports	66	Olds																						DAR; 33	RCH	DOV	NWS	CLT; DNQ	MAR	CAR	ATL; DNQ	RSD		97th	64	
1983	Potter Racing	76	Olds	DAY; DNQ	RCH	CAR	ATL	DAR; DNQ	NWS	MAR	TAL	NSV	DOV								POC; 21	TAL; 30			DAR; 36										39th	662	
1983	Potter Racing	76	Buick											BRI; 28	CLT	RSD	POC; 22																		39th	662	
1983	Potter Racing	76	Pontiac															MCH; DNQ	DAY	NSV			MCH; DNQ												39th	662	
1983	Reeder Racing	02	Pontiac																					BRI; 24		RCH; 19	DOV	MAR; 20	NWS; 29	CLT	CAR; 31	ATL; 22	RSD		39th	662	
1984	Walker Enterprises	06	Ford	DAY	RCH	CAR	ATL	BRI	NWS	DAR	MAR	TAL	NSV	DOV	CLT	RSD	POC	MCH; DNQ	DAY	NSV	POC	TAL	MCH	BRI; DNQ	DAR	RCH	DOV	MAR	CLT	NWS	CAR; 40	ATL	RSD		NA	0	
1985	Walker Enterprises	68	Ford	DAY	RCH	CAR; 17	ATL	BRI; 26	DAR	NWS	MAR	TAL; DNQ	DOV	CLT; DNQ	RSD	POC; 21	MCH	DAY	POC; DNQ	TAL	MCH	BRI; 31	DAR; 28	RCH	DOV	MAR	NWS	CLT	CAR; 22	ATL	RSD				42nd	443	
1986	Walker Enterprises	88	Ford	DAY	RCH	CAR; DNQ	ATL	BRI	DAR; DNQ	NWS	MAR	TAL	DOV; 33	CLT	RSD																				67th	192	
1986	Walker Enterprises	68	Ford													POC; DNQ	MCH	DAY	POC	TAL	GLN	MCH	BRI	DAR	RCH	DOV; 40	MAR	NWS	CLT						67th	192	
1986	Langley Racing	64	Ford																											CAR; 26	ATL	RSD			67th	192	
1987	Salmon Racing	93	Chevy	DAY	CAR	RCH	ATL; 25																												46th	456	
1987	Fillip Racing	81	Ford					DAR; DNQ	NWS	BRI; 18	MAR	TAL	CLT	DOV; 33	POC; DNQ	RSD	MCH; DNQ	DAY	POC; DNQ	TAL			BRI; DNQ	DAR; 33	RCH	DOV; 35	MAR	NWS	CLT	CAR	RSD	ATL			46th	456	
1987	Arrington Racing	61	Ford																		GLN; 30	MCH													46th	456	
1988	Potter Racing	64	Chevy	DAY; DNQ	RCH	CAR	ATL	DAR	BRI; DNQ	NWS	MAR	TAL	CLT	DOV	RSD	POC; DNQ	MCH	DAY	POC; 37	TAL	GLN	MCH	BRI; DNQ	DAR; DNQ	RCH	DOV	MAR	CLT; DNQ	NWS	CAR	PHO	ATL			83rd	52	
1989	O.C. Welch	81	Ford	DAY	CAR	ATL	RCH	DAR	BRI	NWS	MAR	TAL	CLT	DOV	SON	POC	MCH	DAY	POC; DNQ	TAL	GLN	MCH	BRI	DAR; 34	RCH	DOV	MAR	CLT	NWS	CAR	PHO	ATL			93rd	61	
1990	Mansion Motorsports	13	Chevy	DAY; DNQ	RCH	CAR	ATL																												60th	210	
1990	Wawak Racing	74	Pontiac					DAR; DNQ	BRI	NWS	MAR	TAL	CLT; DNQ	DOV; 30	SON	POC	MCH	DAY	POC; 25	TAL	GLN	MCH	BRI; DNQ	DAR	RCH	DOV; 38	MAR	NWS	CLT; DNQ	CAR	PHO	ATL			60th	210	
1991	Wawak Racing	74	Pontiac	DAY	RCH	CAR	ATL	DAR	BRI	NWS	MAR	TAL	CLT	DOV	SON	POC	MCH	DAY	POC	TAL	GLN	MCH	BRI	DAR	RCH	DOV	MAR	NWS	CLT; DNQ	CAR	PHO	ATL			NA	-	
1992	Balough Racing	77	Chevy	DAY; 30	CAR	RCH	ATL; DNQ	DAR; 31	BRI	NWS	MAR	TAL; DNQ	CLT; DNQ				MCH; 33	DAY	POC; 27	TAL		MCH; 30										ATL; DNQ			36th	806	
1992	Balough Racing	77	Buick											DOV; 28	SON	POC; 20					GLN; 33		BRI; DNQ	DAR; 33	RCH; DNQ	DOV; 25	MAR	NWS	CLT; DNQ						36th	806	
1992	Jimmy Means Racing	77	Pontiac																											CAR; 39	PHO				36th	806	
1993	Gray Racing	77	Ford	DAY; DNQ	CAR; 37	RCH	ATL											DAY; DNQ	NHA	POC	TAL	GLN	MCH	BRI	DAR	RCH									66th	101	
1993	Jimmy Means Racing	53	Ford					DAR; 38	BRI	NWS	MAR	TAL	SON	CLT	DOV	POC	MCH																		66th	101	
1993	Balough Racing	77	Ford																								DOV; DNQ	MAR	NWS	CLT	CAR	PHO	ATL		66th	101	

===== Daytona 500 =====
Year	Team	Manufacturer	Start	Finish
1983	Potter Racing	Oldsmobile	DNQ	
1988	Potter Racing	Chevy	DNQ	
1990	Mansion Motorsports	Chevy	DNQ	
1992	Balough Racing	Chevy	29	30
1993	Gray Racing	Ford	DNQ	

==== Nationwide Series ====
NASCAR Nationwide Series results
Year	Team	No.	Make	1	2	3	4	5	6	7	8	9	10	11	12	13	14	15	16	17	18	19	20	21	22	23	24	25	26	27	28	29	30	31	32	33	34	35	NNSC	Pts	Ref
1982		07	Pontiac	DAY; 32	RCH	BRI	MAR	DAR	HCY	SBO	CRW	RCH	LGY	DOV	HCY	CLT	ASH	HCY	SBO	CAR	CRW	SBO	HCY	LGY	IRP	BRI	HCY	RCH	MAR	CLT	HCY	MAR							173rd	67	
1983		07	Olds	DAY; DNQ	RCH	CAR	HCY	MAR	NWS	SBO	GPS	LGY	DOV	BRI	CLT	SBO	HCY	ROU	SBO	ROU	CRW	ROU	SBO	HCY	LGY	IRP	GPS	BRI	HCY	DAR	RCH	NWS	SBO	MAR	ROU	CLT	HCY	MAR	NA	-	
1988		3	Olds	DAY	HCY	CAR	MAR	DAR	BRI	LNG	NZH	SBO	NSV	CLT	DOV	ROU	LAN	LVL	MYB	OXF	SBO	HCY	LNG	IRP	ROU	BRI	DAR	RCH	DOV	MAR	CLT; DNQ	CAR	MAR						NA	-	
2001	Jimmy Means Racing	52	Ford	DAY	CAR	LVS	ATL	DAR	BRI	TEX	NSH	TAL	CAL	RCH	NHA	NZH	CLT	DOV	KEN	MLW	GLN	CHI	GTY	PPR	IRP; 41	MCH	BRI	DAR	RCH	DOV	KAN	CLT	MEM	PHO	CAR	HOM			144th	40	
2003	Jimmy Means Racing	52	Ford	DAY	CAR; 42	LVS	DAR; 41	BRI; 41	TEX	TAL	NSH; 43	CAL	RCH	GTY; 40	NZH; 38	CLT	DOV; 43	NSH; 41	KEN; DNQ	MLW	DAY	CHI; 36	NHA			MCH; DNQ	BRI	DAR; 43	RCH	DOV	KAN	CLT	MEM	ATL	PHO	CAR	HOM		68th	473	
2003	Davis Motorsports	70	Chevy																					PPR; 32	IRP														68th	473	
2003	Moy Racing	77	Ford																									DAR; QL^{†}											68th	473	
2004	Davis Motorsports	0	Chevy	DAY	CAR	LVS	DAR	BRI; DNQ	TEX	NSH	TAL	CAL	GTY	RCH	NZH; 39	CLT	DOV	NSH	KEN	MLW; 43	DAY	CHI	NHA	PPR	IRP	MCH	BRI; DNQ	CAL	RCH; DNQ	DOV	KAN	CLT	MEM	ATL	PHO	DAR	HOM		126th	80	
2007	D.D.L. Motorsports	00	Chevy	DAY	CAL	MXC	LVS	ATL	BRI	NSH	TEX	PHO	TAL	RCH	DAR	CLT	DOV	NSH	KEN	MLW; 42	NHA	DAY	CHI	GTY	IRP; DNQ	CGV	GLN	MCH	BRI	CAL	RCH	DOV	KAN	CLT	MEM	TEX	PHO	HOM	155th	37	
2008	JD Motorsports	0	Chevy	DAY	CAL	LVS	ATL	BRI; 43	NSH	TEX	PHO; 41	MXC	TAL	RCH	DAR	CLT	DOV	NSH	KEN																				89th	217	
2008	JD Motorsports	01	Chevy																	MLW; 32	NHA; 29	DAY	CHI	GTY	IRP	CGV	GLN	MCH	BRI	CAL	RCH	DOV	KAN	CLT	MEM	TEX	PHO	HOM	89th	217	
^{†} - Qualified for Brad Teague

=== ARCA Re/Max Series ===
(key) (Bold – Pole position awarded by qualifying time. Italics – Pole position earned by points standings or practice time. * – Most laps led.)

ARCA Re/Max Series results
Year	Team	No.	Make	1	2	3	4	5	6	7	8	9	10	11	12	13	14	15	16	17	18	19	20	21	22	23	24	25	ARMC	Pts	Ref
1980	Lynn Fowler	6	Chevy	DAY	NWS	FRS	FRS	MCH	TAL; 2	IMS	FRS																		10th	370	
1980	Potter Racing	8	Chevy									MCH; 5																	10th	370	
1981	Spencer Brown	6	Chevy	DAY; DNQ	DSP	FRS	FRS	BFS																					NA	0	
1981		0	Chevy						TAL; 11	FRS	COR																		NA	0	
1983	Potter Racing	19	Olds	DAY	NSV	TAL; 22	LPR	LPR	ISF	IRP	SSP	FRS	BFS	WIN	LPR	POC													NA	0	
1983	Reeder Racing	02	Pontiac														TAL; 32	MCS	FRS	MIL	DSF	ZAN	SND						NA	0	
1984		70	Olds	DAY	ATL; 20																								NA	0	
1984	Satterfield Racing	8	Chevy			TAL; 23	CSP	SMS	FRS	MCS	LCS	IRP	TAL	FRS	ISF	DSF	TOL	MGR											NA	0	
1986		6	Buick	ATL	DAY	ATL; 14	TAL	SIR	SSP	FRS	KIL	CSP	TAL	BLN	ISF	DSF	TOL	MCS	ATL										106th	-	
1989	Arrington Racing	99	Chevy	DAY	ATL	KIL	TAL	FRS	POC	KIL	HAG	POC	TAL	DEL	FRS	ISF	TOL	DSF	SLM	ATL; 5									119th	-	
1990	Mansion Motorsports	98	Chevy	DAY; 38	ATL	KIL	TAL; DNQ	FRS	POC	KIL	TOL	HAG	POC	TAL	MCH	ISF	TOL	DSF	WIN	DEL	ATL								108th	-	
1991	Steve Vardell	35	Buick	DAY	ATL	KIL	TAL	TOL	FRS	POC	MCH	KIL	FRS	DEL	POC	TAL	HPT	MCH; 42	ISF	TOL	DSF	TWS	ATL						137th	-	
1999	Mike Potter Racing	99	Ford	DAY	ATL	SLM	AND	CLT	MCH	POC; DNQ	TOL	SBS	BLN	POC; DNQ	KIL	FRS	FLM	ISF	WIN	DSF	SLM	CLT	TAL	ATL					NA	-	
2000	Mike Potter Racing	99	Ford	DAY	SLM	AND	CLT	KIL	FRS	MCH	POC; 37	TOL	KEN	BLN	POC	WIN	ISF	KEN	DSF	SLM	CLT	TAL	ATL						142nd	45	
2001	Mike Potter Racing	99	Ford	DAY	NSH	WIN	SLM	GTY	KEN	CLT	KAN	MCH	POC	MEM	GLN	KEN	MCH	POC; DNQ	NSH	ISF	CHI	DSF	SLM	TOL	BLN	CLT	TAL	ATL	NA	-	
