= 1992 GM Goodwrench 500 =

Second race of the 1992 NASCAR Winston Cup Series

Race details
- Race 2 of 29 in the 1992 NASCAR Winston Cup Series
- The 1992 GM Goodwrench 500 program cover, featuring Dale Earnhardt.
- Date: March 1, 1992
- Official name: 27th Annual GM Goodwrench 500
- Location: Rockingham, North Carolina, North Carolina Speedway
- Course: Permanent racing facility
- Course length: 1.017 miles (1.637 km)
- Distance: 492 laps, 500.364 mi (805.257 km)
- Scheduled distance: 492 laps, 500.364 mi (805.257 km)
- Average speed: 126.125 miles per hour (202.979 km/h)
- Attendance: 43,600

Pole position
Driver	Kyle Petty	SABCO Racing
- Time: 24.420

Most laps led
Driver	Bill Elliott	Junior Johnson & Associates
- Laps: 260

Winner
No. 11	Bill Elliott	Junior Johnson & Associates

Television in the United States
- Network: TNN
- Announcers: Mike Joy, Buddy Baker, Neil Bonnett

Radio in the United States
- Radio: Motor Racing Network

The 1992 GM Goodwrench 500 was the second stock car race of the 1992 NASCAR Winston Cup Series season and the 27th iteration of the event. The race was held on Sunday, March 1, 1992, before an audience of 43,600 in Rockingham, North Carolina, at North Carolina Speedway, a 1.017 miles (1.637 km) permanent high-banked racetrack. The race took the scheduled 492 laps to complete. At race's end, Junior Johnson & Associates driver Bill Elliott would manage to dominate the late stages of the race to take his 35th career NASCAR Winston Cup Series victory and his first victory of the season. To fill out the top three, Robert Yates Racing driver Davey Allison and Leo Jackson Motorsports driver Harry Gant would finish second and third, respectively.

== Background ==
The layout of North Carolina Motor Speedway, the venue where the race was held.

North Carolina Motor Speedway was opened as a flat, one-mile oval on October 31, 1965. In 1969, the track was extensively reconfigured to a high-banked, D-shaped oval just over one mile in length. In 1997, North Carolina Motor Speedway merged with Penske Motorsports, and was renamed North Carolina Speedway. Shortly thereafter, the infield was reconfigured, and competition on the infield road course, mostly by the SCCA, was discontinued. Currently, the track is home to the Fast Track High Performance Driving School.

=== Entry list ===
- (R) denotes rookie driver.

#	Driver	Team	Make
0	Delma Cowart	H. L. Waters Racing	Ford
1	Rick Mast	Precision Products Racing	Oldsmobile
2	Rusty Wallace	Penske Racing South	Pontiac
3	Dale Earnhardt	Richard Childress Racing	Chevrolet
4	Ernie Irvan	Morgan–McClure Motorsports	Chevrolet
5	Ricky Rudd	Hendrick Motorsports	Chevrolet
6	Mark Martin	Roush Racing	Ford
7	Alan Kulwicki	AK Racing	Ford
8	Dick Trickle	Stavola Brothers Racing	Ford
9	Phil Parsons	Melling Racing	Ford
10	Derrike Cope	Whitcomb Racing	Chevrolet
11	Bill Elliott	Junior Johnson & Associates	Ford
12	Hut Stricklin	Bobby Allison Motorsports	Chevrolet
13	Mike Skinner	Mansion Motorsports	Chevrolet
15	Geoff Bodine	Bud Moore Engineering	Ford
16	Wally Dallenbach Jr.	Roush Racing	Ford
17	Darrell Waltrip	Darrell Waltrip Motorsports	Chevrolet
18	Dale Jarrett	Joe Gibbs Racing	Chevrolet
21	Morgan Shepherd	Wood Brothers Racing	Ford
22	Sterling Marlin	Junior Johnson & Associates	Ford
25	Ken Schrader	Hendrick Motorsports	Chevrolet
26	Brett Bodine	King Racing	Ford
28	Davey Allison	Robert Yates Racing	Ford
30	Michael Waltrip	Bahari Racing	Pontiac
33	Harry Gant	Leo Jackson Motorsports	Oldsmobile
41	Greg Sacks	Larry Hedrick Motorsports	Chevrolet
42	Kyle Petty	SABCO Racing	Pontiac
43	Richard Petty	Petty Enterprises	Pontiac
49	Stanley Smith	BS&S Motorsports	Chevrolet
52	Jimmy Means	Jimmy Means Racing	Pontiac
53	John McFadden	Jimmy Means Racing	Pontiac
55	Ted Musgrave	RaDiUs Motorsports	Oldsmobile
56	Jerry Hill	Hill Motorsports	Pontiac
59	Andy Belmont (R)	Pat Rissi Racing	Ford
66	Chad Little	Cale Yarborough Motorsports	Ford
68	Bobby Hamilton	TriStar Motorsports	Oldsmobile
71	Dave Marcis	Marcis Auto Racing	Chevrolet
87	Randy Baker	Buck Baker Racing	Chevrolet
94	Terry Labonte	Hagan Racing	Oldsmobile
98	Jimmy Spencer	Travis Carter Enterprises	Chevrolet

== Qualifying ==
Qualifying was split into two rounds. The first round was held on Friday, February 28, at 2:30 PM EST. Each driver would have one lap to set a time. During the first round, the top 20 drivers in the round would be guaranteed a starting spot in the race. If a driver was not able to guarantee a spot in the first round, they had the option to scrub their time from the first round and try and run a faster lap time in a second round qualifying run, held on Saturday, February 29, at 11:30 AM EST. As with the first round, each driver would have one lap to set a time. For this specific race, positions 21-40 would be decided on time, and depending on who needed it, a select amount of positions were given to cars who had not otherwise qualified but were high enough in owner's points; up to two provisionals were given. If needed, a past champion who did not qualify on either time or provisionals could use a champion's provisional, adding one more spot to the field.

Kyle Petty, driving for SABCO Racing, would win the pole, setting a time of 24.420 and an average speed of 149.926 miles per hour (241.283 km/h) in the first round.

No drivers would fail to qualify.

=== Full qualifying results ===
Pos.	#	Driver	Team	Make	Time	Speed
1	42	Kyle Petty	SABCO Racing	Pontiac	24.420	149.926
2	11	Bill Elliott	Junior Johnson & Associates	Ford	24.527	149.272
3	6	Mark Martin	Roush Racing	Ford	24.663	148.449
4	26	Brett Bodine	King Racing	Ford	24.808	147.581
5	2	Rusty Wallace	Penske Racing South	Pontiac	24.832	147.439
6	4	Ernie Irvan	Morgan–McClure Motorsports	Chevrolet	24.909	146.983
7	7	Alan Kulwicki	AK Racing	Ford	24.958	146.694
8	3	Dale Earnhardt	Richard Childress Racing	Chevrolet	24.978	146.577
9	25	Ken Schrader	Hendrick Motorsports	Chevrolet	24.979	146.571
10	28	Davey Allison	Robert Yates Racing	Ford	25.014	146.366
11	8	Dick Trickle	Stavola Brothers Racing	Ford	25.014	146.366
12	15	Geoff Bodine	Bud Moore Engineering	Ford	25.023	146.313
13	33	Harry Gant	Leo Jackson Motorsports	Oldsmobile	25.062	146.086
14	30	Michael Waltrip	Bahari Racing	Pontiac	25.082	145.969
15	12	Hut Stricklin	Bobby Allison Motorsports	Chevrolet	25.089	145.928
16	41	Greg Sacks	Larry Hedrick Motorsports	Chevrolet	25.158	145.528
17	71	Dave Marcis	Marcis Auto Racing	Chevrolet	25.177	145.418
18	18	Dale Jarrett	Joe Gibbs Racing	Chevrolet	25.184	145.378
19	1	Rick Mast	Precision Products Racing	Oldsmobile	25.210	145.228
20	68	Bobby Hamilton	TriStar Motorsports	Oldsmobile	25.214	145.205
Failed to lock in Round 1
21	94	Terry Labonte	Hagan Racing	Oldsmobile	25.235	145.084
22	21	Morgan Shepherd	Wood Brothers Racing	Ford	25.249	145.004
23	5	Ricky Rudd	Hendrick Motorsports	Chevrolet	25.250	144.998
24	17	Darrell Waltrip	Darrell Waltrip Motorsports	Chevrolet	25.294	144.746
25	22	Sterling Marlin	Junior Johnson & Associates	Ford	25.337	144.500
26	10	Derrike Cope	Whitcomb Racing	Chevrolet	25.369	144.318
27	98	Jimmy Spencer	Travis Carter Enterprises	Chevrolet	25.399	144.147
28	55	Ted Musgrave	RaDiUs Motorsports	Oldsmobile	25.431	143.966
29	43	Richard Petty	Petty Enterprises	Pontiac	25.533	143.391
30	66	Chad Little	Cale Yarborough Motorsports	Ford	25.582	143.116
31	49	Stanley Smith	BS&S Motorsports	Chevrolet	25.599	143.021
32	13	Mike Skinner	Mansion Motorsports	Chevrolet	25.661	142.676
33	9	Phil Parsons	Melling Racing	Ford	25.674	142.603
34	16	Wally Dallenbach Jr.	Roush Racing	Ford	25.730	142.293
35	52	Jimmy Means	Jimmy Means Racing	Pontiac	26.039	140.604
36	0	Delma Cowart	H. L. Waters Racing	Ford	26.425	138.551
37	53	John McFadden	Jimmy Means Racing	Pontiac	26.443	138.457
38	87	Randy Baker	Buck Baker Racing	Chevrolet	26.467	138.331
39	59	Andy Belmont (R)	Pat Rissi Racing	Ford	26.661	137.324
40	56	Jerry Hill	Hill Motorsports	Pontiac	27.219	134.509
Official first round qualifying results
Official starting lineup

== Race results ==
Fin	St	#	Driver	Team	Make	Laps	Led	Status	Pts	Winnings
1	2	11	Bill Elliott	Junior Johnson & Associates	Ford	492	260	running	185	$57,800
2	10	28	Davey Allison	Robert Yates Racing	Ford	492	190	running	175	$48,875
3	13	33	Harry Gant	Leo Jackson Motorsports	Oldsmobile	492	0	running	165	$31,600
4	14	30	Michael Waltrip	Bahari Racing	Pontiac	491	0	running	160	$18,650
5	9	25	Ken Schrader	Hendrick Motorsports	Chevrolet	491	0	running	155	$21,650
6	3	6	Mark Martin	Roush Racing	Ford	490	0	running	150	$20,575
7	21	94	Terry Labonte	Hagan Racing	Oldsmobile	490	0	running	146	$15,200
8	4	26	Brett Bodine	King Racing	Ford	490	0	running	142	$14,700
9	15	12	Hut Stricklin	Bobby Allison Motorsports	Chevrolet	490	0	running	138	$14,400
10	24	17	Darrell Waltrip	Darrell Waltrip Motorsports	Chevrolet	490	0	running	134	$19,900
11	6	4	Ernie Irvan	Morgan–McClure Motorsports	Chevrolet	489	0	running	130	$18,400
12	19	1	Rick Mast	Precision Products Racing	Oldsmobile	489	0	running	127	$13,300
13	22	21	Morgan Shepherd	Wood Brothers Racing	Ford	489	1	running	129	$13,000
14	12	15	Geoff Bodine	Bud Moore Engineering	Ford	489	0	running	121	$12,600
15	25	22	Sterling Marlin	Junior Johnson & Associates	Ford	489	0	running	118	$12,150
16	29	43	Richard Petty	Petty Enterprises	Pontiac	488	0	running	115	$11,700
17	28	55	Ted Musgrave	RaDiUs Motorsports	Oldsmobile	486	0	running	112	$11,400
18	20	68	Bobby Hamilton	TriStar Motorsports	Oldsmobile	486	0	running	109	$12,150
19	26	10	Derrike Cope	Whitcomb Racing	Chevrolet	482	0	running	106	$8,375
20	27	98	Jimmy Spencer	Travis Carter Enterprises	Chevrolet	480	0	running	103	$10,950
21	34	16	Wally Dallenbach Jr.	Roush Racing	Ford	480	0	running	100	$5,650
22	30	66	Chad Little	Cale Yarborough Motorsports	Ford	475	0	running	97	$7,200
23	32	13	Mike Skinner	Mansion Motorsports	Chevrolet	470	0	running	94	$6,150
24	8	3	Dale Earnhardt	Richard Childress Racing	Chevrolet	469	0	running	91	$16,850
25	38	87	Randy Baker	Buck Baker Racing	Chevrolet	459	0	running	88	$8,700
26	5	2	Rusty Wallace	Penske Racing South	Pontiac	442	17	water pump	90	$13,100
27	40	56	Jerry Hill	Hill Motorsports	Pontiac	440	0	running	82	$5,250
28	23	5	Ricky Rudd	Hendrick Motorsports	Chevrolet	437	0	running	79	$12,950
29	1	42	Kyle Petty	SABCO Racing	Pontiac	430	24	camshaft	81	$12,375
30	33	9	Phil Parsons	Melling Racing	Ford	368	0	running	73	$9,325
31	7	7	Alan Kulwicki	AK Racing	Ford	356	0	running	70	$9,075
32	31	49	Stanley Smith	BS&S Motorsports	Chevrolet	332	0	running	67	$4,500
33	35	52	Jimmy Means	Jimmy Means Racing	Pontiac	269	0	engine	64	$5,850
34	16	41	Greg Sacks	Larry Hedrick Motorsports	Chevrolet	232	0	engine	61	$4,300
35	36	0	Delma Cowart	H. L. Waters Racing	Ford	210	0	brakes	58	$4,200
36	11	8	Dick Trickle	Stavola Brothers Racing	Ford	113	0	water pump	55	$4,125
37	18	18	Dale Jarrett	Joe Gibbs Racing	Chevrolet	73	0	camshaft	52	$4,075
38	39	59	Andy Belmont (R)	Pat Rissi Racing	Ford	27	0	engine	49	$4,060
39	17	71	Dave Marcis	Marcis Auto Racing	Chevrolet	22	0	engine	46	$5,525
40	37	53	John McFadden	Jimmy Means Racing	Pontiac	8	0	valve	43	$4,000
Official race results

== Standings after the race ==
Drivers' Championship standings

	Pos	Driver	Points
	1	Davey Allison	360
	2	Morgan Shepherd	304 (-56)
9	3	Harry Gant	292 (-68)
3	4	Terry Labonte	292 (–68)
1	5	Geoff Bodine	286 (–74)
11	6	Michael Waltrip	274 (–86)
20	7	Bill Elliott	272 (–88)
	8	Ted Musgrave	254 (–106)
4	9	Rick Mast	251 (–109)
4	10	Kyle Petty	231 (–129)
Official driver's standings

- Note: Only the first 10 positions are included for the driver standings.

Previous race: 1992 Daytona 500	NASCAR Winston Cup Series; 1992 season	Next race: 1992 Pontiac Excitement 400
