= 2001 Pop Secret Microwave Popcorn 400 =

33rd race of the 2001 NASCAR Winston Cup Series

Race details
- Race 33 of 36 in the 2001 NASCAR Winston Cup Series
- The 2001 Pop Secret Microwave Popcorn 400 program cover.
- Date: November 4, 2001
- Official name: 37th Annual Pop Secret Microwave Popcorn 400
- Location: Rockingham, North Carolina, North Carolina Speedway
- Course: Permanent racing facility
- Course length: 1.017 miles (1.636 km)
- Distance: 393 laps, 399.681 mi (643.224 km)
- Average speed: 128.941 miles per hour (207.510 km/h)

Pole position
Driver	Kenny Wallace	Dale Earnhardt, Inc.
- Time: 23.668

Most laps led
Driver	Joe Nemechek	Andy Petree Racing
- Laps: 196

Winner
No. 33	Joe Nemechek	Andy Petree Racing

Television in the United States
- Network: TNT
- Announcers: Allen Bestwick, Benny Parsons, Wally Dallenbach Jr.

Radio in the United States
- Radio: Motor Racing Network

The 2001 Pop Secret Microwave Popcorn 400 was the 33rd stock car race of the 2001 NASCAR Winston Cup Series and the 37th iteration of the event. The race was held on Sunday, November 4, 2001, in Rockingham, North Carolina, at North Carolina Speedway, a 1.017 miles (1.637 km) permanent high-banked racetrack. The race took the scheduled 393 laps to complete. At race's end, Joe Nemechek, driving for Andy Petree Racing, managed to dominate the late stages of the race to win his second career NASCAR Winston Cup Series victory and his only victory of the season. The other podium finishers were Kenny Wallace, driving for Dale Earnhardt, Inc., and Johnny Benson Jr., driving for MBV Motorsports, who placed second and third respectively.

== Background ==
North Carolina Speedway was opened as a flat, one-mile oval on October 31, 1965. In 1969, the track was extensively reconfigured to a high-banked, D-shaped oval just over one mile in length. In 1997, North Carolina Motor Speedway merged with Penske Motorsports, and was renamed North Carolina Speedway. Shortly thereafter, the infield was reconfigured, and competition on the infield road course, mostly by the SCCA, was discontinued. Currently, the track is home to the Fast Track High Performance Driving School.

=== Entry list ===
- (R) denotes rookie driver.

#	Driver	Team	Make
1	Kenny Wallace	Dale Earnhardt, Inc.	Chevrolet
01	Jason Leffler (R)	Chip Ganassi Racing with Felix Sabates	Dodge
2	Rusty Wallace	Penske Racing South	Ford
4	Bobby Hamilton Jr.	Morgan–McClure Motorsports	Chevrolet
5	Terry Labonte	Hendrick Motorsports	Chevrolet
6	Mark Martin	Roush Racing	Ford
7	Kevin Lepage	Ultra Motorsports	Ford
8	Dale Earnhardt Jr.	Dale Earnhardt, Inc.	Chevrolet
9	Bill Elliott	Evernham Motorsports	Dodge
10	Johnny Benson Jr.	MBV Motorsports	Pontiac
11	Brett Bodine	Brett Bodine Racing	Ford
12	Mike Wallace	Penske Racing South	Ford
14	Ron Hornaday Jr. (R)	A. J. Foyt Enterprises	Pontiac
15	Michael Waltrip	Dale Earnhardt, Inc.	Chevrolet
17	Matt Kenseth	Roush Racing	Ford
18	Bobby Labonte	Joe Gibbs Racing	Pontiac
19	Casey Atwood (R)	Evernham Motorsports	Dodge
20	Tony Stewart	Joe Gibbs Racing	Pontiac
21	Elliott Sadler	Wood Brothers Racing	Ford
22	Ward Burton	Bill Davis Racing	Dodge
24	Jeff Gordon	Hendrick Motorsports	Chevrolet
25	Jerry Nadeau	Hendrick Motorsports	Chevrolet
26	Jimmy Spencer	Haas-Carter Motorsports	Ford
28	Ricky Rudd	Robert Yates Racing	Ford
29	Kevin Harvick (R)	Richard Childress Racing	Chevrolet
31	Robby Gordon	Richard Childress Racing	Chevrolet
32	Ricky Craven	PPI Motorsports	Ford
33	Joe Nemechek	Andy Petree Racing	Chevrolet
36	Ken Schrader	MBV Motorsports	Pontiac
40	Sterling Marlin	Chip Ganassi Racing with Felix Sabates	Dodge
43	John Andretti	Petty Enterprises	Dodge
44	Buckshot Jones	Petty Enterprises	Dodge
45	Kyle Petty	Petty Enterprises	Dodge
55	Bobby Hamilton	Andy Petree Racing	Chevrolet
66	Todd Bodine	Haas-Carter Motorsports	Ford
71	Dick Trickle	Marcis Auto Racing	Chevrolet
77	Robert Pressley	Jasper Motorsports	Ford
85	Carl Long	Mansion Motorsports	Dodge
88	Dale Jarrett	Robert Yates Racing	Ford
90	Rick Mast	Donlavey Racing	Ford
92	Stacy Compton	Melling Racing	Dodge
93	Dave Blaney	Bill Davis Racing	Dodge
97	Kurt Busch (R)	Roush Racing	Ford
99	Jeff Burton	Roush Racing	Ford
Official entry list

== Practice ==
=== First practice ===
The first practice session was held on Friday, November 2, at 11:20 AM EST. The session lasted for two hours. Casey Atwood, driving for Evernham Motorsports, set the fastest time in the session, with a lap of 23.848 and an average speed of 153.522 miles per hour (247.070 km/h).

Pos.	#	Driver	Team	Make	Time	Speed
1	19	Casey Atwood (R)	Evernham Motorsports	Dodge	23.848	153.522
2	1	Kenny Wallace	Dale Earnhardt, Inc.	Chevrolet	23.865	153.413
3	21	Elliott Sadler	Wood Brothers Racing	Ford	23.882	153.304
Full first practice results

=== Second practice ===
The second session was held on Saturday, November 3, at 10:15 AM EST. The session lasted for 45 minutes. Rusty Wallace, driving for Penske Racing South, set the fastest time in the session, with a lap of 24.455 and an average speed of 149.773 miles per hour (241.036 km/h).

Pos.	#	Driver	Team	Make	Time	Speed
1	2	Rusty Wallace	Penske Racing South	Ford	24.455	149.773
2	20	Tony Stewart	Joe Gibbs Racing	Pontiac	24.618	148.720
3	40	Sterling Marlin	Chip Ganassi Racing with Felix Sabates	Dodge	24.662	148.662
Full second practice results

=== Third and final practice ===
The final practice session, sometimes referred to as Happy Hour, was held on Saturday, November 3, at 12:00 PM EST. The session lasted 45 minutes. Jeff Burton, driving for Roush Racing, set the fastest time in the session, with a lap of 24.475 and an average speed of 149.589 miles per hour (240.740 km/h).

Pos.	#	Driver	Team	Make	Time	Speed
1	99	Jeff Burton	Roush Racing	Ford	24.475	149.589
2	22	Ward Burton	Bill Davis Racing	Dodge	24.573	148.993
3	2	Rusty Wallace	Penske Racing South	Ford	24.601	148.823
Full Happy Hour practice results

== Qualifying ==
Qualifying was held on Friday, November 2, at 3:05 PM EST. Each driver had two laps to set a fastest time; the fastest of the two counted as their official qualifying lap. Positions 1-36 were decided on time, while positions 37-43 were based on provisionals. Six spots were awarded by the use of provisionals based on owner's points. The seventh was awarded to a past champion who has not otherwise qualified for the race. If no past champ needed the provisional, the next team in the owner points would be awarded a provisional.

Kenny Wallace, driving for Dale Earnhardt, Inc., won the pole, setting a time of 23.668 and an average speed of 154.690 miles per hour (248.949 km/h).

Rick Mast was the only driver to fail to qualify.

=== Full qualifying results ===
Pos.	#	Driver	Team	Make	Time	Speed
1	1	Kenny Wallace	Dale Earnhardt, Inc.	Chevrolet	23.668	154.690
2	32	Ricky Craven	PPI Motorsports	Ford	23.720	154.351
3	19	Casey Atwood (R)	Evernham Motorsports	Dodge	23.733	154.266
4	25	Jerry Nadeau	Hendrick Motorsports	Chevrolet	23.736	154.247
5	55	Bobby Hamilton	Andy Petree Racing	Chevrolet	23.818	153.716
6	93	Dave Blaney	Bill Davis Racing	Dodge	23.846	153.535
7	71	Dick Trickle	Marcis Auto Racing	Chevrolet	23.849	153.516
8	24	Jeff Gordon	Hendrick Motorsports	Chevrolet	23.857	153.464
9	6	Mark Martin	Roush Racing	Ford	23.857	153.464
10	20	Tony Stewart	Joe Gibbs Racing	Pontiac	23.858	153.458
11	97	Kurt Busch (R)	Roush Racing	Ford	23.871	153.374
12	36	Ken Schrader	MB2 Motorsports	Pontiac	23.899	153.195
13	33	Joe Nemechek	Andy Petree Racing	Chevrolet	23.911	153.118
14	15	Michael Waltrip	Dale Earnhardt, Inc.	Chevrolet	23.911	153.118
15	7	Kevin Lepage	Ultra Motorsports	Ford	23.914	153.099
16	43	John Andretti	Petty Enterprises	Dodge	23.939	152.939
17	26	Jimmy Spencer	Haas-Carter Motorsports	Ford	23.940	152.932
18	40	Sterling Marlin	Chip Ganassi Racing with Felix Sabates	Dodge	23.948	152.881
19	18	Bobby Labonte	Joe Gibbs Racing	Pontiac	23.949	152.875
20	12	Mike Wallace	Penske Racing South	Ford	23.950	152.868
21	8	Dale Earnhardt Jr.	Dale Earnhardt, Inc.	Chevrolet	23.961	152.798
22	45	Kyle Petty	Petty Enterprises	Dodge	23.977	152.696
23	29	Kevin Harvick (R)	Richard Childress Racing	Chevrolet	23.981	152.671
24	9	Bill Elliott	Evernham Motorsports	Dodge	24.000	152.550
25	22	Ward Burton	Bill Davis Racing	Dodge	24.003	152.531
26	92	Stacy Compton	Melling Racing	Dodge	24.010	152.486
27	31	Robby Gordon	Richard Childress Racing	Chevrolet	24.022	152.410
28	2	Rusty Wallace	Penske Racing South	Ford	24.026	152.385
29	85	Carl Long	Mansion Motorsports	Dodge	24.028	152.372
30	21	Elliott Sadler	Wood Brothers Racing	Ford	24.031	152.353
31	88	Dale Jarrett	Robert Yates Racing	Ford	24.037	152.315
32	14	Ron Hornaday Jr. (R)	A. J. Foyt Enterprises	Pontiac	24.062	152.157
33	4	Bobby Hamilton Jr.	Morgan–McClure Motorsports	Chevrolet	24.069	152.113
34	11	Brett Bodine	Brett Bodine Racing	Ford	24.070	152.106
35	01	Jason Leffler (R)	Chip Ganassi Racing with Felix Sabates	Dodge	24.070	152.106
36	44	Buckshot Jones	Petty Enterprises	Dodge	24.077	152.062
Provisionals
37	28	Ricky Rudd	Robert Yates Racing	Ford	-*	-*
38	99	Jeff Burton	Roush Racing	Ford	-*	-*
39	10	Johnny Benson Jr.	MBV Motorsports	Pontiac	-*	-*
40	17	Matt Kenseth	Roush Racing	Ford	-*	-*
41	77	Robert Pressley	Jasper Motorsports	Ford	-*	-*
42	5	Terry Labonte	Hendrick Motorsports	Chevrolet	-*	-*
43	66	Todd Bodine	Haas-Carter Motorsports	Ford	-*	-*
Failed to qualify
44	90	Rick Mast	Donlavey Racing	Ford	24.123	152.062
Official qualifying results

*Time not available.

== Race results ==
Fin	St	#	Driver	Team	Make	Laps	Led	Status	Pts	Winnings
1	13	33	Joe Nemechek	Andy Petree Racing	Chevrolet	393	196	running	185	$157,535
2	1	1	Kenny Wallace	Dale Earnhardt, Inc.	Chevrolet	393	101	running	175	$113,233
3	39	10	Johnny Benson Jr.	MBV Motorsports	Pontiac	393	0	running	165	$75,350
4	31	88	Dale Jarrett	Robert Yates Racing	Ford	393	0	running	160	$103,252
5	4	25	Jerry Nadeau	Hendrick Motorsports	Chevrolet	393	0	running	155	$65,350
6	25	22	Ward Burton	Bill Davis Racing	Dodge	393	0	running	150	$80,560
7	10	20	Tony Stewart	Joe Gibbs Racing	Pontiac	393	17	running	151	$61,075
8	37	28	Ricky Rudd	Robert Yates Racing	Ford	393	0	running	142	$75,572
9	19	18	Bobby Labonte	Joe Gibbs Racing	Pontiac	393	33	running	143	$92,102
10	40	17	Matt Kenseth	Roush Racing	Ford	392	0	running	134	$57,375
11	18	40	Sterling Marlin	Chip Ganassi Racing with Felix Sabates	Dodge	392	0	running	130	$62,685
12	2	32	Ricky Craven	PPI Motorsports	Ford	392	0	running	127	$50,420
13	41	77	Robert Pressley	Jasper Motorsports	Ford	392	0	running	124	$56,211
14	6	93	Dave Blaney	Bill Davis Racing	Dodge	391	0	running	121	$41,700
15	21	8	Dale Earnhardt Jr.	Dale Earnhardt, Inc.	Chevrolet	391	0	running	118	$75,223
16	15	7	Kevin Lepage	Ultra Motorsports	Ford	391	0	running	115	$54,590
17	33	4	Bobby Hamilton Jr.	Morgan–McClure Motorsports	Chevrolet	391	0	running	112	$43,675
18	38	99	Jeff Burton	Roush Racing	Ford	391	0	running	109	$82,646
19	12	36	Ken Schrader	MB2 Motorsports	Pontiac	391	0	running	106	$47,900
20	3	19	Casey Atwood (R)	Evernham Motorsports	Dodge	391	0	running	103	$44,550
21	14	15	Michael Waltrip	Dale Earnhardt, Inc.	Chevrolet	391	1	running	105	$46,450
22	5	55	Bobby Hamilton	Andy Petree Racing	Chevrolet	391	0	running	97	$46,850
23	30	21	Elliott Sadler	Wood Brothers Racing	Ford	391	0	running	94	$56,550
24	28	2	Rusty Wallace	Penske Racing South	Ford	391	0	running	91	$80,490
25	8	24	Jeff Gordon	Hendrick Motorsports	Chevrolet	390	0	running	88	$81,577
26	17	26	Jimmy Spencer	Haas-Carter Motorsports	Ford	390	0	running	85	$46,850
27	23	29	Kevin Harvick (R)	Richard Childress Racing	Chevrolet	390	0	running	82	$80,777
28	42	5	Terry Labonte	Hendrick Motorsports	Chevrolet	390	0	running	79	$69,780
29	16	43	John Andretti	Petty Enterprises	Dodge	390	0	running	76	$69,402
30	35	01	Jason Leffler (R)	Chip Ganassi Racing with Felix Sabates	Dodge	390	0	running	73	$42,750
31	32	14	Ron Hornaday Jr. (R)	A. J. Foyt Enterprises	Pontiac	389	0	running	70	$34,100
32	20	12	Mike Wallace	Penske Racing South	Ford	389	0	running	67	$63,259
33	7	71	Dick Trickle	Marcis Auto Racing	Chevrolet	389	0	running	64	$33,850
34	9	6	Mark Martin	Roush Racing	Ford	389	0	running	61	$78,076
35	34	11	Brett Bodine	Brett Bodine Racing	Ford	388	0	running	58	$33,600
36	26	92	Stacy Compton	Melling Racing	Dodge	388	0	running	55	$33,550
37	27	31	Robby Gordon	Richard Childress Racing	Chevrolet	388	0	running	52	$65,824
38	36	44	Buckshot Jones	Petty Enterprises	Dodge	385	0	running	49	$41,440
39	11	97	Kurt Busch (R)	Roush Racing	Ford	333	45	engine	51	$41,390
40	24	9	Bill Elliott	Evernham Motorsports	Dodge	314	0	running	43	$58,038
41	43	66	Todd Bodine	Haas-Carter Motorsports	Ford	270	0	handling	40	$33,265
42	29	85	Carl Long	Mansion Motorsports	Dodge	170	0	crash	37	$38,185
43	22	45	Kyle Petty	Petty Enterprises	Dodge	7	0	crash	34	$32,479
Failed to qualify
44		90	Rick Mast	Donlavey Racing	Ford					
Official race results

Previous race: 2001 Checker Auto Parts 500	NASCAR Winston Cup Series; 2001 season	Next race: 2001 Pennzoil Freedom 400
