= Mansion Motorsports =

Former NASCAR team

- Owner(s): Francis Dixon; Thee Dixon
- Base: Durham, North Carolina
- Series: Winston Cup Series; Craftsman Truck Series; ARCA Re/Max Series
- Race drivers: Ken Bouchard; Carl Long; Randy MacDonald; Jim Sauter; Bob Schacht; Mike Skinner; Darrell Waltrip
- Manufacturer: Buick, Chevrolet, Dodge, Ford
- Opened: 1990
- Closed: 2002

Career
- Debut: Winston Cup Series: 1990 AC Delco 500 (Rockingham); Craftsman Truck Series: 1995 Ford Credit 200 (Louisville); ARCA Re/Max Series: 1990 Daytona ARCA 200 (Daytona)
- Latest race: Winston Cup Series: 2002 Pocono 500 (Pocono); Craftsman Truck Series: 2002 MBNA America 200 (Dover; ARCA Re/Max Series: 2002 Big Daddy's Liberty 200 (South Boston)
- Races competed: Total: 43; Winston Cup Series: 18; Craftsman Truck Series: 14; ARCA Re/Max Series: 13

Mansion Motorsports was a former American professional stock car racing team that competed in NASCAR from 1990 to 2002. The team was owned and operated by Thee and Francis Dixon and was based in Durham, North Carolina. Thee Dixon, a former United States Army veteran and owner of Mansion Decorating, was known to be the first African-American team owner in NASCAR since Wendell Scott in the 1960s & 70's.

The team's first attempt came at the 1990 Daytona 500 in a failed effort with driver Mike Potter. Over the next few years, they would have on and off success making races with Mike Skinner behind the wheel, although he would secure the teams best ever finish of 23rd at Rockingham in early 1992. Trans-Am star Dorsey Schroeder would attempt to run the Daytona 500 for the team in 1993, however they were unsuccessful. They would return later in the season at Talladega with 1988 Rookie of the Year Ken Bouchard, this time making the race, however they would finish 40th, out with engine issues after 24 laps. During the season the would team pick up a little bit of sponsorship from Safety-Kleen and Burger King, but not enough to run a full season. IndyCar driver Scott Brayton was to attempt the 1994 Daytona 500 for the team, but sometime before qualifying, the team withdrew the entry from the race and never made an official attempt.

For the next few years, they would move their efforts to the Craftsman Truck Series, again with limited success. Their best results would be a pair of 19th-place finishes with drivers Frank Davis at Flemington in 1995 and Randy MacDonald at Disney in 1997. Carl Long would join the team starting in 1998, he was originally going to attempt his first Cup race for them at the Bristol night race, however Long wasn't approved by NASCAR to run the race, so the team tabbed Ken Bouchard to drive. Long would become the teams mainstay driver for over the next few years, but with limited funding available, came little success and they would end up failing to qualify for the majority of their attempts. At the 2000 Coca-Cola 600, Long surprisingly placed the car 35th on the grid after qualifying, but without a decent motor to run the full race with, the team made a deal with Haas-Carter Motorsports and driver Darrell Waltrip to buy the ride for the race, allowing Waltrip a chance to run in his final Coca-Cola 600. As part of the deal, Big K/Route 66 sponsorship logos from Waltrip's car would be placed on Dixon's car. This would also mark as Long's unofficial Cup debut, as he would replace Waltrip during a mid-race rain delay and would bring the car home in 36th place.

In 2001, the team would make a switch to Dodge and secure a deal to get their engines provided by Petty Enterprises. Unfortunately, without proper funding, the teams final race would come at Pocono in 2002. With just one other crew member, Long himself would make the twelve hour drive up to Pocono. Due to a low car count they had a guaranteed starting spot in the race. They would start and finish in 42nd place, out with brake problems after just 18 laps.

== Motorsports results ==
=== Winston Cup Series ===
==== Car No. 85 results ====
Year	Driver	No.	Make	1	2	3	4	5	6	7	8	9	10	11	12	13	14	15	16	17	18	19	20	21	22	23	24	25	26	27	28	29	30	31	32	33	34	35	36	Owners	Pts
1990	Mike Potter	13	Chevy	DAY; DNQ	RCH	CAR	ATL	DAR	BRI	NWS	MAR	TAL	CLT	DOV	SON	POC	MCH	DAY	POC	TAL	GLN	MCH	BRI	DAR	RCH	DOV	MAR	NWS													
1990	Mike Skinner	13	Chevy																										CLT; DNQ												
1990	Mike Skinner	13	Buick																											CAR; 35	PHO	ATL									
1991	Mike Skinner	13	Chevy	DAY	RCH	CAR; 32	ATL	DAR	BRI	NWS	MAR	TAL	CLT	DOV	SON	POC	MCH	DAY	POC	TAL	GLN	MCH	BRI	DAR	RCH	DOV	MAR	NWS	CLT; 40	CAR	PHO	ATL									
1992	Mike Skinner	13	Chevy	DAY; DNQ	CAR; 23	RCH		DAR; DNQ	BRI	NWS	MAR	TAL																													
1992	Mike Skinner	85	Chevy				ATL; DNQ						CLT; DNQ	DOV	SON	POC	MCH	DAY	POC; 41	TAL	GLN	MCH	BRI	DAR	RCH	DOV	MAR	NWS	CLT; DNQ	CAR; 28	PHO	ATL; DNQ									
1993	Dorsey Schroeder	85	Ford	DAY; DNQ	CAR	RCH	ATL	DAR	BRI	NWS	MAR																														
1993	Ken Bouchard	85	Ford									TAL; 40	SON	CLT; DNQ	DOV; DNQ	POC	MCH	DAY; DNQ	NHA; 29	POC; 25	TAL	GLN	MCH; DNQ	BRI																	
1993	Bob Schacht	85	Ford																						DAR; 40	RCH	DOV	MAR	NWS												
1993	Jim Sauter	85	Ford																											CLT; 38	CAR	PHO	ATL								
1994	Scott Brayton	85	Ford	DAY; Wth	CAR	RCH	ATL	DAR	BRI	NWS	MAR	TAL	SON	CLT	DOV	POC	MCH	DAY	NHA	POC	TAL	IND	GLN	MCH	BRI	DAR	RCH	DOV	MAR	NWS	CLT	CAR	PHO	ATL							
1998	Randy Renfrow	85	Chevy	DAY; Wth	CAR	LVS	ATL	DAR	BRI	TEX	MAR																													60th	86
1998	Bob Strait	85	Chevy									TAL; DNQ	CAL																											60th	86
1998	Randy MacDonald	85	Ford											CLT; DNQ	DOV	RCH	MCH	POC	SON	NHA	POC	IND	GLN	MCH						MAR; DNQ	CLT; DNQ	TAL	DAY	PHO	CAR	ATL				60th	86
1998	Ken Bouchard	85	Ford																						BRI; DNQ	NHA	DAR	RCH	DOV											60th	86
1999	Carl Long	85	Ford	DAY	CAR	LVS	ATL	DAR	TEX	BRI	MAR	TAL	CAL	RCH	CLT; DNQ	DOV	MCH	POC	SON	DAY	NHA	POC	IND	GLN	MCH	BRI	DAR	RCH	NHA	DOV	MAR	CLT	TAL	CAR	PHO	HOM	ATL			66th	29
2000	Carl Long	85	Ford	DAY; DNQ	CAR	LVS	ATL	DAR	BRI	TEX	MAR	TAL	CAL	RCH	CLT; QL^{†}	DOV; DNQ	MCH	POC	SON	DAY	NHA	POC; DNQ	IND	GLN	MCH; DNQ	BRI; DNQ	DAR	RCH	NHA	DOV; 41	MAR; DNQ	CLT; DNQ	TAL	CAR; 32	PHO	HOM	ATL; DNQ			51st	314
2000	Darrell Waltrip	85	Ford												CLT; 36																									51st	314
2001	Carl Long	85	Ford	DAY; DNQ	CAR	LVS	ATL; DNQ	DAR	BRI; DNQ	TEX	MAR	TAL	CAL	RCH	CLT; DNQ	DOV	MCH	POC	SON	DAY	CHI	NHA	POC; DNQ	IND	GLN	MCH	BRI; DNQ	DAR	RCH; DNQ	DOV	KAN		MAR; DNQ	TAL	PHO		HOM; DNQ			49th	317
2001	Carl Long	85	Dodge																													CLT; 29				CAR; 42		ATL; 43	NHA	49th	317
2002	Carl Long	85	Dodge	DAY; DNQ			ATL; DNQ	DAR	BRI	TEX	MAR	TAL	CAL	RCH	CLT; DNQ	DOV	POC; 42	MCH	SON	DAY	CHI	NHA	POC	IND	GLN	MCH	BRI	DAR	RCH	NHA	DOV	KAN	TAL	CLT	MAR	ATL	CAR	PHO	HOM	67th	88
2002	Carl Long	85	Ford		CAR; DNQ	LVS																																		67th	88
^{†} – Qualified, but spot bought by Darrell Waltrip.
