= 2000 Coca-Cola 600 =

12th race of the 2000 NASCAR Winston Cup Series

Race details
- Race 12 of 34 in the 2000 NASCAR Winston Cup Series
- The 2000 Coca-Cola 600 program cover Artwork by NASCAR artist Sam Bass.
- Date: May 28, 2000
- Location: Concord, North Carolina, Charlotte Motor Speedway
- Course: Permanent racing facility
- Course length: 1.5 miles (2.41 km)
- Distance: 400 laps, 600 mi (965.606 km)
- Average speed: 142.64 miles per hour (229.56 km/h)
- Attendance: 183,500

Pole position
Driver	Dale Earnhardt Jr.	Dale Earnhardt, Inc.
- Time: 29.027

Most laps led
Driver	Dale Earnhardt Jr.	Dale Earnhardt, Inc.
- Laps: 175

Winner
No. 17	Matt Kenseth	Roush Racing

Television in the United States
- Network: TBS
- Announcers: Allen Bestwick, Buddy Baker, Dick Berggren

Radio in the United States
- Radio: Performance Racing Network

The 2000 Coca-Cola 600 was the 12th stock car race of the 2000 NASCAR Winston Cup Series and the 41st iteration of the event. The race was held on Sunday, May 28, 2000, before an audience of 183,500 in Concord, North Carolina, at Charlotte Motor Speedway, a 1.5 miles (2.4 km) permanent quad-oval. The race took the scheduled 400 laps to complete. Taking advantage of a misfortunate Jerry Nadeau, Roush Racing's Matt Kenseth managed to make a late-race pass with 26 laps left in the race, leading the rest of the race to take his first career NASCAR Winston Cup Series victory and his only victory of the season. With this win, he became the first ever rookie to win the Coca-Cola 600. To fill out the top three, Joe Gibbs Racing's Bobby Labonte and Richard Childress Racing's Dale Earnhardt finished second and third, respectively.

== Background ==
The layout of the Lowe's Motor Speedway, the venue where the race was held.

Lowe's Motor Speedway is a motorsports complex located in Concord, North Carolina, United States 13 miles from Charlotte, North Carolina. The complex features a1.5 miles (2.4 km) quad oval track that hosts NASCAR racing including the prestigious Coca-Cola 600 on Memorial Day weekend and the NEXTEL All-Star Challenge, as well as the UAW-GM Quality 500. The speedway was built in1959 by Bruton Smith and is considered the home track for NASCAR with many race teams located in the Charlotte area. The track is owned and operated by Speedway Motorsports Inc. (SMI) with Marcus G. Smith (son of Bruton Smith) as track president.

=== Entry list ===
- (R) denotes rookie driver.

#	Driver	Team	Make
1	Steve Park	Dale Earnhardt, Inc.	Chevrolet
2	Rusty Wallace	Penske-Kranefuss Racing	Ford
3	Dale Earnhardt	Richard Childress Racing	Chevrolet
4	Bobby Hamilton	Morgan–McClure Motorsports	Chevrolet
5	Terry Labonte	Hendrick Motorsports	Chevrolet
6	Mark Martin	Roush Racing	Ford
7	Michael Waltrip	Mattei Motorsports	Chevrolet
8	Dale Earnhardt Jr. (R)	Dale Earnhardt, Inc.	Chevrolet
9	Stacy Compton (R)	Melling Racing	Ford
10	Johnny Benson Jr.	Tyler Jet Motorsports	Pontiac
11	Brett Bodine	Brett Bodine Racing	Ford
12	Jeremy Mayfield	Penske-Kranefuss Racing	Ford
13	Robby Gordon (Note: P. J. Jones is recorded as the official finisher of the race. Gordon was attempting to do Double Duty, but a rain delay at the 2000 Indianapolis 500 caused Gordon to arrive at the NASCAR race late. As Jones started the race, he is listed as the official finisher.)	Team Menard	Ford
14	Rick Mast	A. J. Foyt Enterprises	Pontiac
15	Ted Musgrave	Fenley-Moore Motorsports	Ford
16	Kevin Lepage	Roush Racing	Ford
17	Matt Kenseth (R)	Roush Racing	Ford
18	Bobby Labonte	Joe Gibbs Racing	Pontiac
20	Tony Stewart	Joe Gibbs Racing	Pontiac
21	Elliott Sadler	Wood Brothers Racing	Ford
22	Ward Burton	Bill Davis Racing	Pontiac
24	Jeff Gordon	Hendrick Motorsports	Chevrolet
25	Jerry Nadeau	Hendrick Motorsports	Chevrolet
26	Jimmy Spencer	Haas-Carter Motorsports	Ford
27	Mike Bliss (R)	Eel River Racing	Pontiac
28	Ricky Rudd	Robert Yates Racing	Ford
31	Mike Skinner	Richard Childress Racing	Chevrolet
32	Scott Pruett (R)	PPI Motorsports	Ford
33	Joe Nemechek	Andy Petree Racing	Chevrolet
36	Ken Schrader	MB2 Motorsports	Pontiac
40	Sterling Marlin	Team SABCO	Chevrolet
42	Kenny Irwin Jr.	Team SABCO	Chevrolet
43	John Andretti	Petty Enterprises	Pontiac
44	Steve Grissom	Petty Enterprises	Pontiac
50	Ricky Craven	Midwest Transit Racing	Chevrolet
55	Kenny Wallace	Andy Petree Racing	Chevrolet
60	Geoff Bodine	Joe Bessey Racing	Chevrolet
66	Darrell Waltrip (Note: Waltrip failed to qualify for the race. As a result of sponsor obligations, Waltrip bought out qualifier Carl Long's ride, replacing Long with Waltrip for the race.)	Haas-Carter Motorsports	Ford
71	Dave Marcis	Marcis Auto Racing	Chevrolet
75	Wally Dallenbach Jr.	Galaxy Motorsports	Ford
77	Robert Pressley	Jasper Motorsports	Ford
85	Carl Long	Mansion Motorsports	Ford
88	Dale Jarrett	Robert Yates Racing	Ford
90	Ed Berrier (R)	Donlavey Racing	Ford
93	Dave Blaney (R)	Bill Davis Racing	Pontiac
94	Bill Elliott	Bill Elliott Racing	Ford
97	Chad Little	Roush Racing	Ford
99	Jeff Burton	Roush Racing	Ford
Official entry list

== Practice ==
=== First practice ===
The first practice session was held on Wednesday, May 24, at 3:00 PM EST. The session lasted for two hours and 55 minutes. Dale Earnhardt, Inc.'s Dale Earnhardt Jr. set the fastest time in the session, with a lap of 29.325 and an average speed of 184.143 mph (296.349 km/h).

Pos.	#	Driver	Team	Make	Time	Speed
1	8	Dale Earnhardt Jr. (R)	Dale Earnhardt, Inc.	Chevrolet	29.325	184.143
2	12	Jeremy Mayfield	Penske-Kranefuss Racing	Ford	29.435	183.455
3	14	Rick Mast	A. J. Foyt Enterprises	Pontiac	29.461	183.293
Full first practice results

=== Second practice ===
The second practice session was held on Thursday, May 25, at 2:30 PM EST. The session lasted for two hours. Melling Racing's Stacy Compton set the fastest time in the session, with a lap of 30.189 and an average speed of 178.873 mph (287.868 km/h).

Pos.	#	Driver	Team	Make	Time	Speed
1	9	Stacy Compton (R)	Melling Racing	Ford	30.189	178.873
2	6	Mark Martin	Roush Racing	Ford	30.360	177.866
3	40	Sterling Marlin	Team SABCO	Chevrolet	30.396	177.655
Full second practice results

=== Third practice ===
The third practice session was held on Thursday, May 25, at 7:00 PM EST. The session lasted for one hour. Penske-Kranefuss Racing's Rusty Wallace set the fastest time in the session, with a lap of 30.438 and an average speed of 177.410 mph (285.514 km/h).

Pos.	#	Driver	Team	Make	Time	Speed
1	2	Rusty Wallace	Penske-Kranefuss Racing	Ford	30.438	177.410
2	88	Dale Jarrett	Robert Yates Racing	Ford	30.476	177.189
3	31	Mike Skinner	Richard Childress Racing	Chevrolet	30.485	177.136
Full third practice results

=== Fourth practice ===
The fourth practice session was held on Saturday, May 27, at 9:00 AM EST. The session lasted for one hour. Joe Gibbs Racing's Bobby Labonte set the fastest time in the session, with a lap of 30.175 and an average speed of 178.956 mph (288.002 km/h).

Pos.	#	Driver	Team	Make	Time	Speed
1	18	Bobby Labonte	Joe Gibbs Racing	Pontiac	30.175	178.956
2	6	Mark Martin	Roush Racing	Ford	30.195	178.838
3	31	Mike Skinner	Richard Childress Racing	Chevrolet	30.229	178.636
Full fourth practice results

=== Final practice ===
The final practice session, sometimes referred to as Happy Hour, was held on Saturday, May 27, after the preliminary 2000 Carquest 300. The session lasted for one hour. Dale Earnhardt, Inc.'s Dale Earnhardt Jr. set the fastest time in the session, with a lap of 30.441 and an average speed of 177.392 mph (285.485 km/h).

Pos.	#	Driver	Team	Make	Time	Speed
1	8	Dale Earnhardt Jr. (R)	Dale Earnhardt, Inc.	Chevrolet	30.441	177.392
2	22	Ward Burton	Bill Davis Racing	Pontiac	30.563	176.684
3	20	Tony Stewart	Joe Gibbs Racing	Pontiac	30.611	176.407
Full Happy Hour practice results

== Qualifying ==
Qualifying was split into two rounds. The first round was held on Wednesday, May 24, at 8:05 PM EST. Each driver had two laps to set a fastest time; the fastest of the two counted as their official qualifying lap. During the first round, the top 25 drivers in the round was guaranteed a starting spot in the race. If a driver was not able to guarantee a spot in the first round, they had the option to scrub their time from the first round and try and run a faster lap time in a second round qualifying run, held on Thursday, May 25, at 6:00 PM EST. As with the first round, each driver had two laps to set a fastest time; the fastest of the two would count as their official qualifying lap. Positions 26–36 was decided on time, while positions 37–43 was based on provisionals. Six spots were awarded by the use of provisionals based on owner's points. The seventh was awarded to a past champion who has not otherwise qualified for the race. If no past champion needs the provisional, the next team in the owner points was awarded a provisional.

Dale Earnhardt Jr., driving for Dale Earnhardt, Inc., managed to win the pole, setting a time of 29.027 and an average speed of 186.034 miles per hour (299.393 km/h) in the first round.

Five drivers failed to qualify.

=== Full qualifying results ===
Pos.	#	Driver	Team	Make	Time	Speed
1	8	Dale Earnhardt Jr. (R)	Dale Earnhardt, Inc.	Chevrolet	29.027	186.034
2	25	Jerry Nadeau	Hendrick Motorsports	Chevrolet	29.170	185.122
3	94	Bill Elliott	Bill Elliott Racing	Ford	29.206	184.894
4	12	Jeremy Mayfield	Penske-Kranefuss Racing	Ford	29.229	184.748
5	31	Mike Skinner	Richard Childress Racing	Chevrolet	29.271	184.483
6	16	Kevin Lepage	Roush Racing	Ford	29.271	184.483
7	18	Bobby Labonte	Joe Gibbs Racing	Pontiac	29.316	184.200
8	88	Dale Jarrett	Robert Yates Racing	Ford	29.321	184.168
9	20	Tony Stewart	Joe Gibbs Racing	Pontiac	29.387	183.755
10	55	Kenny Wallace	Andy Petree Racing	Chevrolet	29.412	183.599
11	26	Jimmy Spencer	Haas-Carter Motorsports	Ford	29.426	183.511
12	7	Michael Waltrip	Mattei Motorsports	Chevrolet	29.431	183.480
13	4	Bobby Hamilton	Morgan–McClure Motorsports	Chevrolet	29.444	183.399
14	24	Jeff Gordon	Hendrick Motorsports	Chevrolet	29.448	183.374
15	3	Dale Earnhardt	Richard Childress Racing	Chevrolet	29.456	183.324
16	2	Rusty Wallace	Penske-Kranefuss Racing	Ford	29.485	183.144
17	43	John Andretti	Petty Enterprises	Pontiac	29.487	183.132
18	1	Steve Park	Dale Earnhardt, Inc.	Chevrolet	29.508	183.001
19	6	Mark Martin	Roush Racing	Ford	29.510	182.989
20	28	Ricky Rudd	Robert Yates Racing	Ford	29.519	182.933
21	17	Matt Kenseth (R)	Roush Racing	Ford	29.533	182.846
22	50	Ricky Craven	Midwest Transit Racing	Chevrolet	29.540	182.803
23	14	Rick Mast	A. J. Foyt Racing	Pontiac	29.541	182.797
24	77	Robert Pressley	Jasper Motorsports	Ford	29.584	182.531
25	11	Brett Bodine	Brett Bodine Racing	Ford	29.584	182.531
Failed to lock in the first round
26	32	Scott Pruett (R)	PPI Motorsports	Ford	29.589	182.500
27	33	Joe Nemechek	Andy Petree Racing	Chevrolet	29.593	182.476
28	99	Jeff Burton	Roush Racing	Ford	29.622	182.297
29	60	Geoff Bodine	Joe Bessey Racing	Chevrolet	29.650	182.125
30	93	Dave Blaney (R)	Bill Davis Racing	Pontiac	29.654	182.100
31	22	Ward Burton	Bill Davis Racing	Pontiac	29.675	181.971
32	75	Wally Dallenbach Jr.	Galaxy Motorsports	Ford	29.704	181.794
33	42	Kenny Irwin Jr.	Team SABCO	Chevrolet	29.747	181.531
34	36	Ken Schrader	MB2 Motorsports	Pontiac	29.784	181.305
35	85	Carl Long	Mansion Motorsports	Ford	29.786	181.293
36	40	Sterling Marlin	Team SABCO	Chevrolet	29.827	181.044
Provisionals
37	5	Terry Labonte	Hendrick Motorsports	Chevrolet	30.751	175.604
38	97	Chad Little	Roush Racing	Ford	29.874	180.759
39	10	Johnny Benson Jr.	Tyler Jet Motorsports	Pontiac	29.930	180.421
40	9	Stacy Compton (R)	Melling Racing	Ford	30.164	179.021
41	21	Elliott Sadler	Wood Brothers Racing	Ford	30.247	178.530
42	13	Robby Gordon	Team Menard	Ford	29.953	180.282
43	27	Mike Bliss (R)	Eel River Racing	Pontiac	31.589	170.946
Failed to qualify
44	15	Ted Musgrave	Fenley-Moore Motorsports	Ford	30.165	179.015
45	44	Steve Grissom	Petty Enterprises	Pontiac	30.827	175.171
46	90	Ed Berrier (R)	Donlavey Racing	Ford	30.896	174.780
47	66	Darrell Waltrip	Haas-Carter Motorsports	Ford	-	-
48	71	Dave Marcis	Marcis Auto Racing	Chevrolet	-	-
Official first round qualifying results
Official starting lineup

== Race results ==
Fin	St	#	Driver	Team	Make	Laps	Led	Status	Pts	Winnings
1	21	17	Matt Kenseth (R)	Roush Racing	Ford	400	32	running	180	$200,950
2	7	18	Bobby Labonte	Joe Gibbs Racing	Pontiac	400	35	running	175	$138,600
3	15	3	Dale Earnhardt	Richard Childress Racing	Chevrolet	400	23	running	170	$103,250
4	1	8	Dale Earnhardt Jr. (R)	Dale Earnhardt, Inc.	Chevrolet	400	175	running	170	$110,900
5	8	88	Dale Jarrett	Robert Yates Racing	Ford	400	2	running	160	$95,000
6	4	12	Jeremy Mayfield	Penske-Kranefuss Racing	Ford	400	7	running	155	$71,850
7	5	31	Mike Skinner	Richard Childress Racing	Chevrolet	400	3	running	151	$70,850
8	16	2	Rusty Wallace	Penske-Kranefuss Racing	Ford	400	0	running	142	$64,350
9	18	1	Steve Park	Dale Earnhardt, Inc.	Chevrolet	400	0	running	138	$59,950
10	14	24	Jeff Gordon	Hendrick Motorsports	Chevrolet	400	4	running	139	$78,950
11	28	99	Jeff Burton	Roush Racing	Ford	400	0	running	130	$67,100
12	19	6	Mark Martin	Roush Racing	Ford	399	0	running	127	$62,100
13	31	22	Ward Burton	Bill Davis Racing	Pontiac	399	0	running	124	$63,100
14	9	20	Tony Stewart	Joe Gibbs Racing	Pontiac	399	2	running	126	$62,300
15	6	16	Kevin Lepage	Roush Racing	Ford	399	0	running	118	$57,200
16	39	10	Johnny Benson Jr.	Tyler Jet Motorsports	Pontiac	399	0	running	115	$42,800
17	20	28	Ricky Rudd	Robert Yates Racing	Ford	399	0	running	112	$50,395
18	12	7	Michael Waltrip	Mattei Motorsports	Chevrolet	399	0	running	109	$51,275
19	36	40	Sterling Marlin	Team SABCO	Chevrolet	398	0	running	106	$49,095
20	38	97	Chad Little	Roush Racing	Ford	398	0	running	103	$51,695
21	41	21	Elliott Sadler	Wood Brothers Racing	Ford	398	0	running	100	$47,470
22	37	5	Terry Labonte	Hendrick Motorsports	Chevrolet	398	0	running	97	$52,605
23	27	33	Joe Nemechek	Andy Petree Racing	Chevrolet	398	0	running	94	$46,295
24	33	42	Kenny Irwin Jr.	Team SABCO	Chevrolet	397	0	running	91	$45,440
25	11	26	Jimmy Spencer	Haas-Carter Motorsports	Ford	397	0	running	88	$45,540
26	24	77	Robert Pressley	Jasper Motorsports	Ford	396	0	running	85	$36,840
27	10	55	Kenny Wallace	Andy Petree Racing	Chevrolet	396	0	running	82	$45,540
28	32	75	Wally Dallenbach Jr.	Galaxy Motorsports	Ford	396	0	running	79	$36,480
29	29	60	Geoff Bodine	Joe Bessey Racing	Chevrolet	396	0	running	76	$44,425
30	25	11	Brett Bodine	Brett Bodine Racing	Ford	395	0	running	73	$33,905
31	17	43	John Andretti	Petty Enterprises	Pontiac	393	0	running	70	$51,380
32	43	27	Mike Bliss (R)	Eel River Racing	Pontiac	392	0	running	67	$33,365
33	40	9	Stacy Compton (R)	Melling Racing	Ford	391	0	running	64	$36,355
34	13	4	Bobby Hamilton	Morgan–McClure Motorsports	Chevrolet	391	0	running	61	$41,350
35	42	13	P. J. Jones	Team Menard	Ford	389	0	running	58	$33,345
36	35	85	Darrell Waltrip	Mansion Motorsports	Ford	386	0	running	55	$33,340
37	34	36	Ken Schrader	MB2 Motorsports	Pontiac	371	0	running	52	$33,335
38	2	25	Jerry Nadeau	Hendrick Motorsports	Chevrolet	357	115	engine	54	$61,925
39	23	14	Rick Mast	A. J. Foyt Racing	Pontiac	350	0	engine	46	$33,320
40	30	93	Dave Blaney (R)	Bill Davis Racing	Pontiac	291	0	engine	43	$33,315
41	26	32	Scott Pruett (R)	PPI Motorsports	Ford	148	0	accident	40	$33,310
42	22	50	Ricky Craven	Midwest Transit Racing	Chevrolet	133	0	engine	37	$33,305
43	3	94	Bill Elliott	Bill Elliott Racing	Ford	122	2	engine	39	$45,202
Failed to qualify
44		15	Ted Musgrave	Fenley-Moore Motorsports	Ford					
45		44	Steve Grissom	Petty Enterprises	Pontiac					
46		90	Ed Berrier (R)	Donlavey Racing	Ford					
47		66	Darrell Waltrip	Haas-Carter Motorsports	Ford					
48		71	Dave Marcis	Marcis Auto Racing	Chevrolet					
Official race results

== Standings after the race ==
Drivers' Championship standings

	Pos	Driver	Points
	1	Bobby Labonte	1,776
	2	Ward Burton	1,722 (−54)
	3	Mark Martin	1,695 (−81)
1	4	Dale Earnhardt	1,693 (−83)
1	5	Jeff Burton	1,672 (−104)
	6	Dale Jarrett	1,630 (−146)
	7	Rusty Wallace	1,578 (−198)
1	8	Jeff Gordon	1,539 (−237)
1	9	Ricky Rudd	1,523 (−253)
1	10	Tony Stewart	1,456 (−320)
Official driver's standings

- Note: Only the first 10 positions are included for the driver standings.

== Notes ==
Previous race: 2000 Pontiac Excitement 400	NASCAR Winston Cup Series; 2000 season	Next race: 2000 MBNA Platinum 400
