= 1993 Daytona 500 =

First race of the 1993 NASCAR Winston Cup Series

1993 Daytona 500 By STP
Race details
- Race 1 of 30 in the 1993 NASCAR Winston Cup Series
- The 1993 Daytona 500 program cover, featuring Davey Allison and Bobby Allison.
- Date: February 14, 1993
- Official name: 35th Annual Daytona 500 By STP
- Location: Daytona Beach, Florida, Daytona International Speedway
- Course: Permanent racing facility
- Course length: 2.5 miles (4.0 km)
- Distance: 200 laps, 500 mi (804.672 km)
- Average speed: 154.972 miles per hour (249.403 km/h)
- Attendance: 150,000

Pole position
Driver	Kyle Petty	SABCO Racing
- Time: 47.512

Most laps led
Driver	Dale Earnhardt	Richard Childress Racing
- Laps: 107

Winner
No. 18	Dale Jarrett	Joe Gibbs Racing

Television in the United States
- Network: CBS
- Announcers: Ken Squier, Neil Bonnett, Ned Jarrett

Radio in the United States
- Radio: Motor Racing Network

The 1993 Daytona 500 was the first stock car race of the 1993 NASCAR Winston Cup Series season and the 35th iteration of the event. The race was held on Sunday, February 14, 1993, before an audience of 150,000 in Daytona Beach, Florida at Daytona International Speedway, a 2.5 miles (4.0 km) permanent triangular-shaped superspeedway. The race took the scheduled 200 laps to complete.

In the final laps of the race, Joe Gibbs Racing's Dale Jarrett, Hendrick Motorsports' Jeff Gordon and Richard Childress Racing's Dale Earnhardt engaged in a battle for the victory. Heading into two laps left in the race, Gordon was passed by Jarrett for second, allowing Jarrett to stay behind Earnhardt. Proceeding into the final lap, Earnhardt had let Jarrett get to the inside of his car, allowing Jarrett to pass Earnhardt for the lead by the time the two exited out of the second turn. Jarrett was then able to defend the rest of the field to take his second career NASCAR Winston Cup Series victory, his only win of the season, and his first career Daytona 500 victory. To fill out the top three, the aforementioned Dale Earnhardt and Bud Moore Engineering's Geoff Bodine finished second and third, respectively.

== Background ==
The layout of Daytona International Speedway, the venue where the race was held.

Daytona International Speedway is one of three superspeedways to hold NASCAR races, the other two being Indianapolis Motor Speedway and Talladega Superspeedway. The standard track at Daytona International Speedway is a four-turn superspeedway that is 2.5 miles (4.0 km) long. The track's turns are banked at 31 degrees, while the front stretch, the location of the finish line, is banked at 18 degrees.

=== Entry list ===
- (R) denotes rookie driver.

#	Driver	Team	Make
0	Delma Cowart	H. L. Waters Racing	Ford
1	Rick Mast	Precision Products Racing	Ford
2	Rusty Wallace	Penske Racing South	Pontiac
3	Dale Earnhardt	Richard Childress Racing	Chevrolet
4	Ernie Irvan	Morgan–McClure Motorsports	Chevrolet
5	Ricky Rudd	Hendrick Motorsports	Chevrolet
6	Mark Martin	Roush Racing	Ford
7	Alan Kulwicki	AK Racing	Ford
8	Sterling Marlin	Stavola Brothers Racing	Ford
9	Chad Little	Melling Racing	Ford
11	Bill Elliott	Junior Johnson & Associates	Ford
12	Jimmy Spencer	Bobby Allison Motorsports	Ford
14	Terry Labonte	Hagan Racing	Chevrolet
15	Geoff Bodine	Bud Moore Engineering	Ford
16	Wally Dallenbach Jr.	Roush Racing	Ford
17	Darrell Waltrip	Darrell Waltrip Motorsports	Chevrolet
18	Dale Jarrett	Joe Gibbs Racing	Chevrolet
20	Joe Ruttman	Moroso Racing	Ford
21	Morgan Shepherd	Wood Brothers Racing	Ford
22	Bobby Labonte (R)	Bill Davis Racing	Ford
23	Eddie Bierschwale	B&B Racing	Oldsmobile
24	Jeff Gordon (R)	Hendrick Motorsports	Chevrolet
25	Ken Schrader	Hendrick Motorsports	Chevrolet
26	Brett Bodine	King Racing	Ford
27	Hut Stricklin	Junior Johnson & Associates	Ford
28	Davey Allison	Robert Yates Racing	Ford
29	Kerry Teague	Linro Motorsports	Chevrolet
30	Michael Waltrip	Bahari Racing	Pontiac
31	Steve Kinser	Folsom Racing	Chevrolet
32	Jimmy Horton	Active Motorsports	Chevrolet
33	Harry Gant	Leo Jackson Motorsports	Chevrolet
40	Kenny Wallace (R)	SABCO Racing	Pontiac
41	Phil Parsons	Larry Hedrick Motorsports	Chevrolet
42	Kyle Petty	SABCO Racing	Pontiac
44	Rick Wilson	Petty Enterprises	Pontiac
45	Rich Bickle	Terminal Trucking Motorsports	Ford
46	Al Unser Jr.	Hendrick Motorsports	Chevrolet
48	James Hylton	Hylton Motorsports	Ford
50	A. J. Foyt	A. J. Foyt Racing	Ford
51	Jeff Purvis	Phoenix Racing	Chevrolet
52	Jimmy Means (Note: Means was involved in an accident during a Wednesday, February 10 practice session. The accident left Means with a fractured shoulder blade and a slight concussion. As doctors did not clear him to race, he was substituted by Jimmy Hensley for the Twin 125 Qualifiers and the race.)	Jimmy Means Racing	Ford
55	Ted Musgrave	RaDiUs Motorsports	Ford
66	Derrike Cope	Cale Yarborough Motorsports	Ford
68	Bobby Hamilton	TriStar Motorsports	Ford
71	Dave Marcis	Marcis Auto Racing	Chevrolet
73	Stanley Smith	Barkdoll Racing	Chevrolet
75	Dick Trickle	Butch Mock Motorsports	Ford
77	Mike Potter	Gray Racing	Ford
83	Lake Speed	Speed Racing	Ford
85	Dorsey Schroeder	Mansion Motorsports	Ford
89	Jim Sauter	Mueller Brothers Racing	Ford
90	Bobby Hillin Jr.	Donlavey Racing	Ford
95	Ken Ragan	Sadler Brothers Racing	Ford
99	Brad Teague	Ball Motorsports	Chevrolet
Official entry list

== Qualifying ==
Qualifying was set by the 1993 Gatorade Twin 125 Qualifiers. The top two positions were set by qualifying speeds held for the Twin 125 Qualifiers held on Saturday, February 6, with the top two qualifiers in the session earning the top two positions for the Daytona 500. The rest of the starting was set in the Twin 125 Qualifiers, held on Thursday, February 11, during two races. The top 14 finishers in the first race, excluding the pole position winner, set the inside row from rows two to 15, and the top 14 finishers in the second race, excluding the outside pole position winner, set the outside row from rows two to 15. The remaining non-qualifiers set positions 31-40 based on qualifying speeds from the first qualifying session held on Sunday. If needed, up to two extra provisionals were given to teams high enough in the previous season's owner's standings that did not qualify for the race by either qualifying speed or from the Twin 125 Qualifiers.

Kyle Petty, driving for SABCO Racing, managed to win the pole, setting a time of 47.512 and an average speed of 154.972 miles per hour (249.403 km/h) in Saturday's session.

13 drivers failed to qualify.

=== Full qualifying results ===
Pos.	#	Driver	Team	Make	Reason
1	42	Kyle Petty	SABCO Racing	Pontiac	Qualified on pole
2	18	Dale Jarrett	Joe Gibbs Racing	Chevrolet	Qualified on outside pole
3	24	Jeff Gordon (R)	Hendrick Motorsports	Chevrolet	First in Twin 125 #1
4	3	Dale Earnhardt	Richard Childress Racing	Chevrolet	First in Twin 125 #2
5	11	Bill Elliott	Junior Johnson & Associates	Ford	Second in Twin 125 #1
6	15	Geoff Bodine	Bud Moore Engineering	Ford	Second in Twin 125 #2
7	25	Ken Schrader	Hendrick Motorsports	Chevrolet	Fourth in Twin 125 #1
8	4	Ernie Irvan	Morgan–McClure Motorsports	Chevrolet	Fourth in Twin 125 #2
9	90	Bobby Hillin Jr.	Donlavey Racing	Ford	Fifth in Twin 125 #1
10	7	Alan Kulwicki	AK Racing	Ford	Fifth in Twin 125 #2
11	28	Davey Allison	Robert Yates Racing	Ford	Sixth in Twin 125 #1
12	5	Ricky Rudd	Hendrick Motorsports	Chevrolet	Sixth in Twin 125 #2
13	83	Lake Speed	Speed Racing	Ford	Seventh in Twin 125 #1
14	8	Sterling Marlin	Stavola Brothers Racing	Ford	Seventh in Twin 125 #2
15	44	Rick Wilson	Petty Enterprises	Pontiac	Eighth in Twin 125 #1
16	41	Phil Parsons	Larry Hedrick Motorsports	Chevrolet	Eighth in Twin 125 #2
17	9	Chad Little	Melling Racing	Ford	Ninth in Twin 125 #1
18	27	Hut Stricklin	Junior Johnson & Associates	Ford	Ninth in Twin 125 #2
19	14	Terry Labonte	Hagan Racing	Chevrolet	Tenth in Twin 125 #1
20	26	Brett Bodine	King Racing	Ford	Tenth in Twin 125 #2
21	75	Dick Trickle	Butch Mock Motorsports	Ford	11th in Twin 125 #1
22	16	Wally Dallenbach Jr.	Roush Racing	Ford	11th in Twin 125 #2
23	6	Mark Martin	Roush Racing	Ford	12th in Twin 125 #1
24	40	Kenny Wallace (R)	SABCO Racing	Pontiac	12th in Twin 125 #2
25	22	Bobby Labonte (R)	Bill Davis Racing	Ford	13th in Twin 125 #1
26	17	Darrell Waltrip	Darrell Waltrip Motorsports	Chevrolet	13th in Twin 125 #2
27	68	Bobby Hamilton	TriStar Motorsports	Ford	14th in Twin 125 #1
28	30	Michael Waltrip	Bahari Racing	Pontiac	14th in Twin 125 #2
29	32	Jimmy Horton	Active Motorsports	Chevrolet	15th in Twin 125 #1
30	12	Jimmy Spencer	Bobby Allison Motorsports	Ford	15th in Twin 125 #2
31	1	Rick Mast	Precision Products Racing	Ford	Speed provisional (188.588)
32	21	Morgan Shepherd	Wood Brothers Racing	Ford	Speed provisional (188.344)
33	55	Ted Musgrave	RaDiUs Motorsports	Ford	Speed provisional (188.332)
34	2	Rusty Wallace	Penske Racing South	Pontiac	Speed provisional (188.107)
35	66	Derrike Cope	Cale Yarborough Motorsports	Ford	Speed provisional (187.919)
36	20	Joe Ruttman	Moroso Racing	Ford	Speed provisional (187.872)
37	33	Harry Gant	Leo Jackson Motorsports	Chevrolet	Speed provisional (187.707)
38	52	Jimmy Hensley	Jimmy Means	Ford	Speed provisional (187.559)
39	89	Jim Sauter	Mueller Brothers Racing	Ford	Speed provisional (187.426)
40	46	Al Unser Jr.	Hendrick Motorsports	Chevrolet	Speed provisional (186.749)
41	71	Dave Marcis	Marcis Auto Racing	Chevrolet	Owner's points provisional
Failed to qualify
42	85	Dorsey Schroeder	Mansion Motorsports	Ford	20th in Twin 125 #1
43	48	James Hylton	Hylton Motorsports	Ford	16th in Twin 125 #2
44	45	Rich Bickle	Terminal Trucking Motorsports	Ford	22nd in Twin 125 #1
45	29	Kerry Teague	Linro Motorsports	Chevrolet	18th in Twin 125 #2
46	0	Delma Cowart	H. L. Waters Racing	Ford	23rd in Twin 125 #1
47	77	Mike Potter	Gray Racing	Ford	19th in Twin 125 #2
48	73	Stanley Smith	Barkdoll Racing	Chevrolet	25th in Twin 125 #1
49	99	Brad Teague	Ball Motorsports	Chevrolet	20th in Twin 125 #2
50	31	Steve Kinser	Folsom Racing	Chevrolet	26th in Twin 125 #1
51	51	Jeff Purvis	Phoenix Racing	Chevrolet	21st in Twin 125 #2
52	95	Ken Ragan	Sadler Brothers Racing	Ford	27th in Twin 125 #1
53	50	A. J. Foyt	A. J. Foyt Racing	Ford	22nd in Twin 125 #2
54	23	Eddie Bierschwale	B&B Racing	Oldsmobile	27th in Twin 125 #2
Official Twin 125 Qualifiers results
Official starting lineup

== Race Summary ==
=== The start ===
The first lap was led by rookie Jeff Gordon, who was the youngest winner of a Gatorade 125-mile qualifier on Thursday. Shortly after this, CBS reporter Chris Economaki said that Rookie of the Year is an award he would be almost assured of. Engine failures for Dick Trickle and Jimmy Hensley (the latter would crash in Turn 1 in his substitution for the injured Jimmy Means) brought out the first two caution flags in the first 15 laps.

=== Mid-race summary ===
Over the next 110 laps, Dale Earnhardt, Ken Schrader, and Kyle Petty would lead the majority of the laps, with Jeff Gordon and Bobby Hillin Jr. leading a handful of laps as legitimate leaders. 1990 winner Derrike Cope and Harry Gant also led several of these laps, but they had pitted under the early yellows to stretch their fuel runs.

Meanwhile, two-time winner Bill Elliott dropped out of the race on lap 99, the victim of overheating in his #11 Ford Thunderbird.

=== Closing stages ===
Dale Earnhardt was the leader on Lap 130 when Wally Dallenbach Jr. brushed the Turn 4 wall. Sterling Marlin and Michael Waltrip were lined up behind him, and when Marlin backed off, Waltrip tagged him and sent him into a spin. Marlin caught air as he spun by Joe Ruttman, who was coming to pit road to retire with engine failure. 5 laps after the restart, Rick Wilson and Bobby Hamilton collided on the backstretch. Approaching 50 laps to go, 1991 Daytona 500 winner Ernie Irvan was turned into the wall exiting Turn 2, eliminating a possible winner. The first major wreck happened when Dale Earnhardt touched 1992 Indianapolis 500 winner Al Unser Jr. (competing in his only Winston Cup Series race). His #46 Chevrolet crashed into the 90 of Bobby Hillin Jr., who spun into the path of polesitter Kyle Petty. Both had a heated verbal exchange, Hillin reportedly was telling Petty he had no brakes, but both were victims of circumstances. With 31 laps to go, Derrike Cope and Waltrip touched in Turn 2. Waltrip spun down into 1989 Winston Cup Champion Rusty Wallace and sent him into a horrific series of flips and rollovers in the grass. A little more than minute later, Ken Squier reported that Wallace came on the radio to crew chief Buddy Parrott and said, "I'm okay."

=== The finish ===
By this time, Hut Stricklin and Sterling Marlin presented themselves as contenders. Earnhardt led from the restart, only to be passed briefly by Dale Jarrett. The #3 was soon in the lead again, as he was pursued by the Chevrolets of Jarrett and Jeff Gordon, and the Fords of 1986 Daytona 500 winner Geoff Bodine, Hut Stricklin, Mark Martin, and Morgan Shepherd. The "Dale and Dale Show" commenced as Jarrett passed Earnhardt in the tri-oval as they took the white flag. As the leaders exited Turn 2, the CBS Sports producers told Ken Squier and Neil Bonnett through their headsets to let Ned Jarrett to "call his son Dale home". Jarrett held off Earnhardt by .16 (sixteen hundredths) of a second to claim his first Daytona 500 win.

== Race results ==
Fin	St	#	Driver	Team	Make	Laps	Led	Status	Pts	Winnings
1	2	18	Dale Jarrett	Joe Gibbs Racing	Chevrolet	200	8	running	180	$238,200
2	4	3	Dale Earnhardt	Richard Childress Racing	Chevrolet	200	107	running	180	$181,825
3	6	15	Geoff Bodine	Bud Moore Engineering	Ford	200	1	running	170	$141,450
4	18	27	Hut Stricklin	Junior Johnson & Associates	Ford	200	7	running	165	$95,950
5	3	24	Jeff Gordon (R)	Hendrick Motorsports	Chevrolet	200	2	running	160	$111,150
6	23	6	Mark Martin	Roush Racing	Ford	200	0	running	150	$74,625
7	32	21	Morgan Shepherd	Wood Brothers Racing	Ford	200	0	running	146	$62,350
8	7	25	Ken Schrader	Hendrick Motorsports	Chevrolet	200	14	running	147	$64,025
9	14	8	Sterling Marlin	Stavola Brothers Racing	Ford	200	1	running	143	$54,225
10	22	16	Wally Dallenbach Jr.	Roush Racing	Ford	200	0	running	134	$49,125
11	19	14	Terry Labonte	Hagan Racing	Chevrolet	200	0	running	130	$47,750
12	31	1	Rick Mast	Precision Products Racing	Ford	200	0	running	127	$43,375
13	30	12	Jimmy Spencer	Bobby Allison Motorsports	Ford	200	0	running	124	$42,130
14	13	83	Lake Speed	Speed Racing	Ford	200	0	running	121	$36,930
15	33	55	Ted Musgrave	RaDiUs Motorsports	Ford	200	0	running	118	$38,975
16	28	30	Michael Waltrip	Bahari Racing	Pontiac	200	0	running	115	$37,305
17	20	26	Brett Bodine	King Racing	Ford	200	0	running	112	$36,585
18	26	17	Darrell Waltrip	Darrell Waltrip Motorsports	Chevrolet	200	0	running	109	$40,415
19	39	89	Jim Sauter	Mueller Brothers Racing	Ford	199	0	running	106	$28,645
20	25	22	Bobby Labonte (R)	Bill Davis Racing	Ford	199	0	running	103	$29,685
21	37	33	Harry Gant	Leo Jackson Motorsports	Chevrolet	199	6	running	105	$36,780
22	16	41	Phil Parsons	Larry Hedrick Motorsports	Chevrolet	199	0	running	97	$30,525
23	24	40	Kenny Wallace (R)	SABCO Racing	Pontiac	199	0	running	94	$27,820
24	17	9	Chad Little	Melling Racing	Ford	198	0	running	91	$27,965
25	29	32	Jimmy Horton	Active Motorsports	Chevrolet	198	0	running	88	$26,560
26	10	7	Alan Kulwicki	AK Racing	Ford	197	0	running	85	$42,405
27	27	68	Bobby Hamilton	TriStar Motorsports	Ford	197	0	running	82	$27,775
28	11	28	Davey Allison	Robert Yates Racing	Ford	197	1	running	84	$37,445
29	35	66	Derrike Cope	Cale Yarborough Motorsports	Ford	189	30	running	81	$29,165
30	12	5	Ricky Rudd	Hendrick Motorsports	Chevrolet	177	0	running	73	$31,285
31	1	42	Kyle Petty	SABCO Racing	Pontiac	170	19	accident	75	$56,580
32	34	2	Rusty Wallace	Penske Racing South	Pontiac	168	0	accident	67	$38,600
33	41	71	Dave Marcis	Marcis Auto Racing	Chevrolet	164	0	running	64	$25,470
34	15	44	Rick Wilson	Petty Enterprises	Pontiac	163	1	accident	66	$26,315
35	9	90	Bobby Hillin Jr.	Donlavey Racing	Ford	157	3	accident	63	$28,960
36	40	46	Al Unser Jr.	Hendrick Motorsports	Chevrolet	157	0	accident	55	$23,005
37	8	4	Ernie Irvan	Morgan–McClure Motorsports	Chevrolet	148	0	accident	52	$40,275
38	36	20	Joe Ruttman	Moroso Racing	Ford	128	0	engine	49	$23,395
39	5	11	Bill Elliott	Junior Johnson & Associates	Ford	99	0	engine	46	$52,660
40	38	52	Jimmy Hensley	Jimmy Means	Ford	11	0	accident	43	$21,925
41	21	75	Dick Trickle	Butch Mock Motorsports	Ford	2	0	engine	40	$23,300
Failed to qualify
42		85	Dorsey Schroeder	Mansion Motorsports	Ford					
43		48	James Hylton	Hylton Motorsports	Ford					
44		45	Rich Bickle	Terminal Trucking Motorsports	Ford					
45		29	Kerry Teague	Linro Motorsports	Chevrolet					
46		0	Delma Cowart	H. L. Waters Racing	Ford					
47		77	Mike Potter	Gray Racing	Ford					
48		73	Stanley Smith	Barkdoll Racing	Chevrolet					
49		99	Brad Teague	Ball Motorsports	Chevrolet					
50		31	Steve Kinser	Folsom Racing	Chevrolet					
51		51	Jeff Purvis	Phoenix Racing	Chevrolet					
52		95	Ken Ragan	Sadler Brothers Racing	Ford					
53		50	A. J. Foyt	A. J. Foyt Racing	Ford					
54		23	Eddie Bierschwale	B&B Racing	Oldsmobile					
Official race results

== Standings after the race ==
Drivers' Championship standings

Pos	Driver	Points
1	Dale Jarrett	180 (1st)
2	Dale Earnhardt	180 (2nd)
3	Geoff Bodine	170 (-10)
4	Hut Stricklin	165 (–15)
5	Jeff Gordon	160 (–20)
6	Mark Martin	150 (–30)
7	Ken Schrader	147 (–33)
8	Morgan Shepherd	146 (–34)
9	Sterling Marlin	143 (–37)
10	Wally Dallenbach Jr.	134 (–46)
Official driver's standings

- Note: Only the first 10 positions are included for the driver standings.

== Notes ==
Previous race: 1992 Hooters 500	NASCAR Winston Cup Series; 1993 season	Next race: 1993 GM Goodwrench 500
