= Stanley Smith (racing driver) =

American racing driver (1949–2020)

- Born: September 29, 1949; Chelsea, Alabama, U.S.
- Died: December 9, 2020 (aged 71)

NASCAR Cup Series career
- 28 races run over 4 years
- Best finish: 35th (1992)
- First race: 1990 DieHard 500 (Talladega)
- Last race: 1993 DieHard 500 (Talladega)
Wins	Top tens	Poles
0	0	0

NASCAR O'Reilly Auto Parts Series career
- 4 races run over 2 years
- Best finish: 78th (1990)
- First race: 1990 All Pro 300 (Charlotte)
- Last race: 1992 SplitFire 200 (Dover)
Wins	Top tens	Poles
0	0	0

Stanley Smith (September 29, 1949 – December 9, 2020) was an American stock car racing driver and dirt-track racer, who competed in 28 NASCAR Winston Cup Series races between 1990 and 1993.

== Racing career ==
Smith started his racing career in 1972. In 1989 he won the 1989 NASCAR All-American Challenge Series championship. Smith qualified twelfth for his first Winston Cup Series start at the 1990 DieHard 500 at Talladega Superspeedway; during the race he was involved in a pit road mishap when he lost control of his car and hit several crew members for Tracy Leslie's team. No one was seriously injured.

In 1991, Chad Knaus entered NASCAR competition as a crew member for Smith's team; Smith also introduced Interstate Batteries into NASCAR as a sponsor before the company moved to Joe Gibbs Racing. In addition to making limited Winston Cup Series starts, Smith also drove in the Busch Grand National Series, making four starts between 1991 and 1992; he also scored a victory at Michigan International Speedway in his lone start in the ARCA Permatex SuperCar Series in 1991.

Smith (No. 49) and Jimmy Horton (No. 32) wreck at Talladega in 1993.

At the 1993 DieHard 500 at Talladega, Smith was involved in a multi-car accident that saw fellow competitor Jimmy Horton flip over the track's retaining wall and roll down the embankment outside the track. The multi-car crash happened on lap 70 when Smith clipped Horton's car; Horton then hit three other cars before launching over the wall. Smith hit the wall almost head-on, suffering a basilar skull fracture and massive blood loss; his driver's suit, which was white before the race, was soaked in blood as he was rushed to Caraway Methodist Medical Center in critical condition. Smith was unconscious for ten days following the accident; during his recovery he underwent multiple surgeries, and the left side of his face was left paralyzed from nerve damage.

As a result of this and other wrecks, Talladega installed catch fencing along the entire track, not just where spectator stands were present; in addition, following the 1993 season NASCAR mandated cars be fitted with roof flaps in an attempt to stop flips during accidents.

While he would never race in the Winston Cup Series again, Smith would return to competition in regional racing in 1995. In 2000 he won Five Flags Speedway's Snowflake 100; in 2004, at the age of 54, he won a NASCAR AutoZone Elite Division, Southeast Series event at Kentucky Speedway. Smith's final racing start came at the 2008 Snowball Derby; he would crash after 120 laps, finishing 33rd.

== Personal life ==
Smith was born on September 29, 1949, in Birmingham, Alabama. Outside of racing he worked in the drywall industry operating Stanley Smith Drywall Inc. which helped to fund his racing career. He was married and had three children.

Smith died of interstitial pneumonia on December 9, 2020, at age 71. Smith had been battling the disease since September.

== Motorsports career results ==
=== NASCAR ===
(key) (Bold – Pole position awarded by qualifying time. Italics – Pole position earned by points standings or practice time. * – Most laps led.)

==== Winston Cup Series ====
NASCAR Winston Cup Series results
Year	Team	No.	Make	1	2	3	4	5	6	7	8	9	10	11	12	13	14	15	16	17	18	19	20	21	22	23	24	25	26	27	28	29	30	NWCC	Pts	Ref
1990	BS&S Motorsports	49	Pontiac	DAY	RCH	CAR	ATL	DAR	BRI	NWS	MAR	TAL; Wth^{†}	CLT	DOV	SON	POC	MCH	DAY	POC															98th	52	
1990	Tri-Star Motorsports	68	Pontiac																	TAL; 37	GLN	MCH	BRI	DAR	RCH	DOV	MAR	NWS	CLT	CAR	PHO	ATL		98th	52	
1991	BS&S Motorsports	49	Buick	DAY	RCH	CAR; 37	ATL; DNQ	DAR	BRI	NWS	MAR	TAL; 21	CLT; 36	DOV	SON; 23	POC	MCH; 23	DAY; 40	POC	TAL; 31	GLN	MCH; 40	BRI	DAR	RCH	DOV; 22	MAR	NWS	CLT; 22	CAR	PHO; 36	ATL; 25		36th	893	
1992	BS&S Motorsports	49	Chevy	DAY; 22	CAR; 32	RCH; 27	ATL; 32	DAR; DNQ	BRI	NWS	MAR	TAL; 33	CLT; 30	DOV	SON	POC	MCH; 40	DAY; 22	POC	TAL; 27	GLN	MCH; 35	BRI	DAR	RCH; 34	DOV	MAR	NWS	CLT; 36	CAR	PHO; 32	ATL; 39		35th	959	
1993	Barkdoll Racing	73	Chevy	DAY; DNQ																														89th	43	
1993	BS&S Motorsports	49	Chevy		CAR; DNQ	RCH	ATL	DAR	BRI	NWS; DNQ	MAR	TAL; DNQ	SON	CLT; DNQ	DOV	POC	MCH	DAY; DNQ	NHA	POC	TAL; 40	GLN	MCH	BRI	DAR	RCH	DOV	MAR	NWS	CLT	CAR	PHO	ATL	89th	43	
^{†} - Withdrew after practice crash

===== Daytona 500 =====
Year	Team	Manufacturer	Start	Finish	Ref
1992	BS&S Motorsports	Chevrolet	30	22	
1993	Barkdoll Racing	Chevrolet	DNQ		

==== Busch Series ====
NASCAR Busch Series results
Year	Team	No.	Make	1	2	3	4	5	6	7	8	9	10	11	12	13	14	15	16	17	18	19	20	21	22	23	24	25	26	27	28	29	30	31	NBSC	Pts	Ref
1990	BS&S Motorsports	94	Buick	DAY	RCH	CAR	MAR	HCY	DAR	BRI	LAN	SBO	NZH	HCY	CLT	DOV; DNQ	ROU	VOL	MYB	OXF	NHA	SBO	DUB	IRP	ROU	BRI	DAR	RCH	DOV	MAR	CLT; 20	NHA	CAR; 37	MAR	78th	155	
1992	Laughlin Racing	45	Chevy	DAY	CAR	RCH	ATL	MAR	DAR	BRI	HCY	LAN	DUB	NZH	CLT	DOV	ROU	MYB	GLN	VOL	NHA	TAL; 19	IRP	ROU	MCH	NHA	BRI	DAR	RCH	DOV; 26	CLT	MAR	CAR	HCY	79th	191	

=== ARCA Permatex SuperCar Series ===
(key) (Bold – Pole position awarded by qualifying time. Italics – Pole position earned by points standings or practice time. * – Most laps led.)

ARCA Permatex SuperCar Series results
Year	Team	No.	Make	1	2	3	4	5	6	7	8	9	10	11	12	13	14	15	16	17	18	19	20	APSC	Pts	Ref
1991	Folsom Racing	11	Buick	DAY	ATL	KIL	TAL	TOL	FRS	POC	MCH	KIL	FRS	DEL	POC	TAL	HPT	MCH; 1*	ISF	TOL	DSF	TWS	ATL	148th	-	
