= 1992 Daytona 500 =

First race of the 1992 NASCAR Winston Cup Series

1992 Daytona 500 By STP
Race details
- Race 1 of 29 in the 1992 NASCAR Winston Cup Series
- The 1992 Daytona 500 program cover, featuring Ernie Irvan.
- Date: February 16, 1992
- Official name: 34th Annual Daytona 500 By STP
- Location: Daytona Beach, Florida, Daytona International Speedway
- Course: Permanent racing facility
- Course length: 2.5 miles (4.0 km)
- Distance: 200 laps, 500 mi (804.672 km)
- Average speed: 160.256 miles per hour (257.907 km/h)
- Attendance: 140,000

Pole position
Driver	Sterling Marlin	Junior Johnson & Associates
- Time: 46.823

Most laps led
Driver	Davey Allison	Robert Yates Racing
- Laps: 127

Winner
No. 28	Davey Allison	Robert Yates Racing

Television in the United States
- Network: CBS
- Announcers: Ken Squier, Neil Bonnett, Ned Jarrett

Radio in the United States
- Radio: Motor Racing Network

The 1992 Daytona 500 was the first stock car race of the 1992 NASCAR Winston Cup Series season and the 34th iteration of the event. The race was held on Sunday, February 16, 1992, before an audience of 140,000 in Daytona Beach, Florida at Daytona International Speedway, a 2.5 miles (4.0 km) permanent triangular-shaped superspeedway. The race took the scheduled 200 laps to complete.

Leading for over half of the race, Robert Yates Racing's Davey Allison managed to avoid a major wreck in the first half of the race that took out several contenders. Afterwards, Allison managed to dominate the latter stages of the race, leading the final 98 laps en route to his 14th career NASCAR Winston Cup Series victory, his first victory of the season, and his only career Daytona 500 victory. To fill out the top three, Wood Brothers Racing's Morgan Shepherd and Bud Moore Engineering's Geoff Bodine finished second and third, respectively.

== Background ==
The layout of Daytona International Speedway, the venue where the race was held.

Daytona International Speedway is one of three superspeedways to hold NASCAR races, the other two being Indianapolis Motor Speedway and Talladega Superspeedway. The standard track at Daytona International Speedway is a four-turn superspeedway that is 2.5 miles (4.0 km) long. The track's turns are banked at 31 degrees, while the front stretch, the location of the finish line, is banked at 18 degrees.

=== Entry list ===
- (R) denotes rookie driver.

#	Driver	Team	Make
0	Delma Cowart	H. L. Waters Racing	Ford
1	Rick Mast	Precision Products Racing	Oldsmobile
2	Rusty Wallace	Penske Racing South	Pontiac
3	Dale Earnhardt	Richard Childress Racing	Chevrolet
03	Kerry Teague	KT Motorsports	Oldsmobile
4	Ernie Irvan	Morgan–McClure Motorsports	Chevrolet
5	Ricky Rudd	Hendrick Motorsports	Chevrolet
6	Mark Martin	Roush Racing	Ford
7	Alan Kulwicki	AK Racing	Ford
8	Rick Wilson	Stavola Brothers Racing	Ford
9	Phil Parsons	Melling Racing	Ford
10	Derrike Cope	Whitcomb Racing	Chevrolet
11	Bill Elliott	Junior Johnson & Associates	Ford
12	Hut Stricklin	Bobby Allison Motorsports	Chevrolet
13	Dave Mader III	Folsom Racing	Chevrolet
13	Mike Skinner	Mansion Motorsports	Chevrolet
14	A. J. Foyt	A. J. Foyt Racing	Oldsmobile
15	Geoff Bodine	Bud Moore Engineering	Ford
16	Wally Dallenbach Jr.	Roush Racing	Ford
17	Darrell Waltrip	Darrell Waltrip Motorsports	Chevrolet
18	Dale Jarrett	Joe Gibbs Racing	Chevrolet
20	Mike Wallace	Moroso Racing	Oldsmobile
21	Morgan Shepherd	Wood Brothers Racing	Ford
22	Sterling Marlin	Junior Johnson & Associates	Ford
23	Eddie Bierschwale	B&B Racing	Oldsmobile
25	Ken Schrader	Hendrick Motorsports	Chevrolet
26	Brett Bodine	King Racing	Ford
28	Davey Allison	Robert Yates Racing	Ford
30	Michael Waltrip	Bahari Racing	Pontiac
31	Bobby Hillin Jr.	Team Ireland	Chevrolet
33	Harry Gant	Leo Jackson Motorsports	Oldsmobile
41	Greg Sacks	Larry Hedrick Motorsports	Chevrolet
42	Kyle Petty	SABCO Racing	Pontiac
43	Richard Petty	Petty Enterprises	Pontiac
47	Buddy Baker	Close Racing	Oldsmobile
48	James Hylton	Hylton Motorsports	Chevrolet
49	Stanley Smith	BS&S Motorsports	Chevrolet
50	Clay Young	Clay Young Racing	Pontiac
52	Jimmy Means	Jimmy Means Racing	Pontiac
55	Ted Musgrave	RaDiUs Motorsports	Oldsmobile
59	Andy Belmont (R)	Pat Rissi Racing	Ford
62	Ben Hess	Gray Racing	Ford
66	Chad Little	Cale Yarborough Motorsports	Ford
68	Bobby Hamilton	TriStar Motorsports	Oldsmobile
71	Dave Marcis	Marcis Auto Racing	Chevrolet
73	Phil Barkdoll	Barkdoll Racing	Oldsmobile
75	Dick Trickle	RahMoc Enterprises	Oldsmobile
77	Mike Potter	Balough Racing	Chevrolet
83	Lake Speed	Speed Racing	Chevrolet
84	Dave Pletcher Sr.	Pletcher Racing	Pontiac
88	Joe Booher	Malloch Racing	Pontiac
89	Jim Sauter	Mueller Brothers Racing	Pontiac
90	Dorsey Schroeder	Donlavey Racing	Ford
94	Terry Labonte	Hagan Racing	Oldsmobile
95	Bob Schacht (R)	Sadler Brothers Racing	Oldsmobile
97	Mark Gibson	Collins Racing	Oldsmobile
98	Jimmy Spencer	Travis Carter Enterprises	Chevrolet
99	Brad Teague	Ball Motorsports	Chevrolet

== Qualifying ==
Qualifying was set by the 1992 Gatorade Twin 125 Qualifiers. The top two positions were set by qualifying speeds held for the Twin 125 Qualifiers held on Sunday, February 9, with the top two qualifiers in the session earning the top two positions for the Daytona 500. The rest of the starting was set in the Twin 125 Qualifiers, held on Thursday, February 14, during two races. The top 14 finishers in the first race, excluding the pole position winner, set the inside row from rows two to 15, and the top 14 finishers in the second race, excluding the outside pole position winner, set the outside row from rows two to 15. The remaining non-qualifiers set positions 31-40 based on qualifying speeds from the first qualifying session held on Sunday. If needed, up to two extra provisionals were given to teams high enough in the previous season's owner's standings that did not qualify for the race by either qualifying speed or from the Twin 125 Qualifiers.

Sterling Marlin, driving for Junior Johnson & Associates, managed to win the pole, setting a time of 46.823 and an average speed of 192.213 miles per hour (309.337 km/h) in Sunday's session.

15 drivers failed to qualify.

=== Full qualifying results ===
Pos.	#	Driver	Team	Make	Reason
1	22	Sterling Marlin	Junior Johnson & Associates	Ford	Qualified on pole
2	11	Bill Elliott	Junior Johnson & Associates	Ford	Qualified on outside pole
3	3	Dale Earnhardt	Richard Childress Racing	Chevrolet	First in Twin 125 #1
4	21	Morgan Shepherd	Wood Brothers Racing	Ford	Second in Twin 125 #2
5	6	Mark Martin	Roush Racing	Ford	Second in Twin 125 #1
6	28	Davey Allison	Robert Yates Racing	Ford	Third in Twin 125 #2
7	4	Ernie Irvan	Morgan–McClure Motorsports	Chevrolet	Third in Twin 125 #1
8	5	Ricky Rudd	Hendrick Motorsports	Chevrolet	Fourth in Twin 125 #2
9	41	Greg Sacks	Larry Hedrick Motorsports	Chevrolet	Fourth in Twin 125 #1
10	30	Michael Waltrip	Bahari Racing	Pontiac	Fifth in Twin 125 #2
11	33	Harry Gant	Leo Jackson Motorsports	Oldsmobile	Fifth in Twin 125 #1
12	17	Darrell Waltrip	Darrell Waltrip Motorsports	Chevrolet	Sixth in Twin 125 #2
13	1	Rick Mast	Precision Products Racing	Oldsmobile	Sixth in Twin 125 #1
14	66	Chad Little	Cale Yarborough Motorsports	Ford	Seventh in Twin 125 #2
15	25	Ken Schrader	Hendrick Motorsports	Chevrolet	Seventh in Twin 125 #1
16	15	Geoff Bodine	Bud Moore Engineering	Ford	Eighth in Twin 125 #2
17	2	Rusty Wallace	Penske Racing South	Pontiac	Eighth in Twin 125 #1
18	26	Brett Bodine	King Racing	Ford	Ninth in Twin 125 #2
19	9	Phil Parsons	Melling Racing	Ford	Ninth in Twin 125 #1
20	10	Derrike Cope	Whitcomb Racing	Chevrolet	Tenth in Twin 125 #2
21	03	Kerry Teague	KT Motorsports	Oldsmobile	Tenth in Twin 125 #1
22	68	Bobby Hamilton	TriStar Motorsports	Oldsmobile	11th in Twin 125 #2
23	71	Dave Marcis	Marcis Auto Racing	Chevrolet	11th in Twin 125 #1
24	47	Buddy Baker	Close Racing	Oldsmobile	12th in Twin 125 #2
25	73	Phil Barkdoll	Barkdoll Racing	Oldsmobile	12th in Twin 125 #1
26	31	Bobby Hillin Jr.	Team Ireland	Chevrolet	13th in Twin 125 #2
27	0	Delma Cowart	H. L. Waters Racing	Ford	13th in Twin 125 #1
28	75	Dick Trickle	RahMoc Enterprises	Oldsmobile	14th in Twin 125 #2
29	77	Mike Potter	Balogh Racing	Chevrolet	14th in Twin 125 #1
30	49	Stanley Smith	BS&S Motorsports	Chevrolet	15th in Twin 125 #2
31	90	Dorsey Schroeder	Donlavey Racing	Ford	Speed provisional (191.404)
32	43	Richard Petty	Petty Enterprises	Pontiac	Speed provisional (189.909)
33	42	Kyle Petty	SABCO Racing	Pontiac	Speed provisional (189.717)
34	94	Terry Labonte	Hagan Racing	Oldsmobile	Speed provisional (188.897)
35	18	Dale Jarrett	Joe Gibbs Racing	Chevrolet	Speed provisional (188.644)
36	95	Bob Schacht	Sadler Brothers Racing	Oldsmobile	Speed provisional (188.225)
37	16	Wally Dallenbach Jr.	Roush Racing	Ford	Speed provisional (188.206)
38	8	Rick Wilson	Stavola Brothers Racing	Ford	Speed provisional (187.993)
39	14	A. J. Foyt	A. J. Foyt Racing	Oldsmobile	Speed provisional (187.903)
40	55	Ted Musgrave	RaDiUs Motorsports	Chevrolet	Speed provisional (187.336)
41	7	Alan Kulwicki	AK Racing	Ford	Owner's points provisional
42	12	Hut Stricklin	Bobby Allison Motorsports	Chevrolet	Owner's points provisional
Failed to qualify or withdrew
43	99	Brad Teague	Ball Motorsports	Chevrolet	15th in Twin 125 #1
44	83	Lake Speed	Speed Racing	Chevrolet	17th in Twin 125 #2
45	59	Andy Belmont (R)	Pat Rissi Racing	Ford	16th in Twin 125 #1
46	89	Jim Sauter	Mueller Brothers Racing	Pontiac	18th in Twin 125 #2
47	23	Eddie Bierschwale	B&B Racing	Oldsmobile	20th in Twin 125 #1
48	20	Mike Wallace	Moroso Racing	Oldsmobile	19th in Twin 125 #2
49	13	Dave Mader III	Folsom Racing	Chevrolet	28th in Twin 125 #1
50	98	Jimmy Spencer	Travis Carter Enterprises	Chevrolet	21st in Twin 125 #2
51	62	Ben Hess	Gray Racing	Ford	29th in Twin 125 #1
52	13	Mike Skinner	Mansion Motorsports	Chevrolet	22nd in Twin 125 #2
53	88	Joe Booher	Malloch Racing	Pontiac	23rd in Twin 125 #2
54	50	Clay Young	Clay Young Racing	Pontiac	24th in Twin 125 #2
55	48	James Hylton	Hylton Motorsports	Chevrolet	25th in Twin 125 #2
56	52	Jimmy Means	Jimmy Means Racing	Pontiac	26th in Twin 125 #2
57	97	Mark Gibson	Collins Racing	Oldsmobile	27th in Twin 125 #2
WD	84	Dave Pletcher Sr.	Pletcher Racing	Pontiac	Lack of practice speed
Official Twin 125 Qualifiers results
Official starting lineup

== Race Summary ==
=== The start ===
The initial laps of the race were free of incidents, although on lap 41 Geoff Bodine and Morgan Shepherd touched exiting Turn 4 with no further incident. Brett Bodine and Ricky Rudd fell out in the first half of the race with separate engine failures, as the Junior Johnson cars of Sterling Marlin and Bill Elliott established themselves as the cars to beat. Davey Allison's crew gambled with a two-tire change but caught a lucky break when Geoff Bodine was penalized for speeding, and gained a drafting partner.

=== The Big One ===
Rain fell after 80 laps, and when the race restarted Ernie Irvan went for the lead on lap 92. He came up in front of Sterling Marlin, but had not cleared him, and also moved him up the track into his teammate Bill Elliott who was on the outside. The ensuing mayhem collected polesitter Sterling Marlin, Ernie Irvan, Bill Elliott, Mark Martin, Ken Schrader and Dale Earnhardt. Also, Bobby Hillin Jr., Dale Jarrett, Alan Kulwicki, Chad Little, Richard Petty, Hut Stricklin, Rusty Wallace, and Darrell Waltrip were involved.

The wreck ended the race for Jarrett, Schrader, Marlin, Hillin, and Little, with their cars being terminally damaged.

=== The finish ===
On Lap 144 Rick Wilson was planning to pit the Stavola Brothers Ford, but Kerry Teague did not realize it and ran into him. This brought out the third yellow flag in the race. On Lap 166 Ernie Irvan's crippled car spun to bring out the fourth caution flag. Leaders Allison, Shepherd, and Michael Waltrip made their final stops. Waltrip fell back after the restart with an engine that was quitting. This left the two Ford Thunderbirds of Allison and Shepherd to race for the win, finishing in this order. This win made the Allisons the second father-son duo to win the Daytona 500, joining Lee and Richard Petty. Alan Kulwicki finished a quiet fourth which kicked off an unlikely championship run.

== Race results ==
Fin	St	#	Driver	Team	Make	Laps	Led	Status	Pts	Winnings
1	6	28	Davey Allison	Robert Yates Racing	Ford	200	127	running	185	$244,050
2	4	21	Morgan Shepherd	Wood Brothers Racing	Ford	200	7	running	175	$181,300
3	16	15	Geoff Bodine	Bud Moore Engineering	Ford	200	0	running	165	$116,250
4	41	7	Alan Kulwicki	AK Racing	Ford	200	0	running	160	$87,500
5	28	75	Dick Trickle	RahMoc Enterprises	Oldsmobile	200	0	running	155	$78,800
6	33	42	Kyle Petty	SABCO Racing	Pontiac	200	0	running	150	$67,700
7	34	94	Terry Labonte	Hagan Racing	Oldsmobile	199	0	running	146	$58,575
8	40	55	Ted Musgrave	RaDiUs Motorsports	Chevrolet	199	0	running	142	$52,750
9	3	3	Dale Earnhardt	Richard Childress Racing	Chevrolet	199	0	running	138	$87,000
10	19	9	Phil Parsons	Melling Racing	Ford	199	0	running	134	$49,150
11	24	47	Buddy Baker	Close Racing	Oldsmobile	199	0	running	130	$38,275
12	11	33	Harry Gant	Leo Jackson Motorsports	Oldsmobile	199	0	running	127	$51,100
13	13	1	Rick Mast	Precision Products Racing	Oldsmobile	199	0	running	124	$40,355
14	9	41	Greg Sacks	Larry Hedrick Motorsports	Chevrolet	199	0	running	121	$36,790
15	37	16	Wally Dallenbach Jr.	Roush Racing	Ford	198	0	running	118	$29,700
16	32	43	Richard Petty	Petty Enterprises	Pontiac	198	0	running	115	$32,530
17	25	73	Phil Barkdoll	Barkdoll Racing	Oldsmobile	198	0	running	112	$27,960
18	10	30	Michael Waltrip	Bahari Racing	Pontiac	197	3	flagged	114	$37,140
19	31	90	Dorsey Schroeder	Donlavey Racing	Ford	196	0	running	106	$25,750
20	23	71	Dave Marcis	Marcis Auto Racing	Chevrolet	195	0	running	103	$26,210
21	39	14	A. J. Foyt	A. J. Foyt Racing	Oldsmobile	195	0	running	100	$23,055
22	30	49	Stanley Smith	BS&S Motorsports	Chevrolet	195	0	running	97	$24,150
23	38	8	Rick Wilson	Stavola Brothers Racing	Ford	195	0	running	94	$24,045
24	42	12	Hut Stricklin	Bobby Allison Motorsports	Chevrolet	188	0	running	91	$27,740
25	27	0	Delma Cowart	H. L. Waters Racing	Ford	188	0	running	88	$23,285
26	12	17	Darrell Waltrip	Darrell Waltrip Motorsports	Chevrolet	180	1	running	90	$33,580
27	2	11	Bill Elliott	Junior Johnson & Associates	Ford	178	23	running	87	$60,255
28	7	4	Ernie Irvan	Morgan–McClure Motorsports	Chevrolet	166	0	handling	79	$43,370
29	5	6	Mark Martin	Roush Racing	Ford	162	0	running	76	$49,675
30	29	77	Mike Potter	Balogh Racing	Chevrolet	151	0	fuel pump	73	$21,710
31	17	2	Rusty Wallace	Penske Racing South	Pontiac	150	0	running	70	$30,455
32	22	68	Bobby Hamilton	TriStar Motorsports	Oldsmobile	125	0	piston	67	$27,350
33	21	03	Kerry Teague	KT Motorsports	Oldsmobile	122	0	accident	64	$22,445
34	20	10	Derrike Cope	Whitcomb Racing	Chevrolet	120	0	radiator	61	$23,115
35	1	22	Sterling Marlin	Junior Johnson & Associates	Ford	91	33	accident	63	$34,435
36	35	18	Dale Jarrett	Joe Gibbs Racing	Chevrolet	91	0	accident	55	$19,780
37	15	25	Ken Schrader	Hendrick Motorsports	Chevrolet	91	6	accident	57	$30,500
38	26	31	Bobby Hillin Jr.	Team Ireland	Chevrolet	91	0	accident	49	$20,370
39	14	66	Chad Little	Cale Yarborough Motorsports	Ford	90	0	accident	46	$22,760
40	8	5	Ricky Rudd	Hendrick Motorsports	Chevrolet	79	0	engine	43	$34,350
41	18	26	Brett Bodine	King Racing	Ford	13	0	distributor	40	$25,150
42	36	95	Bob Schacht	Sadler Brothers Racing	Oldsmobile	7	0	engine	37	$18,250
Failed to qualify or withdrew
43		99	Brad Teague	Ball Motorsports	Chevrolet					
44		83	Lake Speed	Speed Racing	Chevrolet					
45		59	Andy Belmont (R)	Pat Rissi Racing	Ford					
46		89	Jim Sauter	Mueller Brothers Racing	Pontiac					
47		23	Eddie Bierschwale	B&B Racing	Oldsmobile					
48		20	Mike Wallace	Moroso Racing	Oldsmobile					
49		13	Dave Mader III	Folsom Racing	Chevrolet					
50		98	Jimmy Spencer	Travis Carter Enterprises	Chevrolet					
51		62	Ben Hess	Gray Racing	Ford					
52		13	Mike Skinner	Mansion Motorsports	Chevrolet					
53		88	Joe Booher	Malloch Racing	Pontiac					
54		50	Clay Young	Clay Young Racing	Pontiac					
55		48	James Hylton	Hylton Motorsports	Chevrolet					
56		52	Jimmy Means	Jimmy Means Racing	Pontiac					
57		97	Mark Gibson	Collins Racing	Oldsmobile					
WD		84	Dave Pletcher Sr.	Pletcher Racing	Pontiac					
Official race results

== Standings after the race ==
Drivers' Championship standings

Pos	Driver	Points
1	Davey Allison	185
2	Morgan Shepherd	175 (-10)
3	Geoff Bodine	165 (-20)
4	Alan Kulwicki	160 (–25)
5	Dick Trickle	155 (–30)
6	Kyle Petty	150 (–35)
7	Terry Labonte	146 (–39)
8	Ted Musgrave	142 (–43)
9	Dale Earnhardt	138 (–47)
10	Phil Parsons	134 (–51)
Official driver's standings

- Note: Only the first 10 positions are included for the driver standings.

Previous race: 1991 Hardee's 500	NASCAR Winston Cup Series; 1992 season	Next race: 1992 GM Goodwrench 500
