= NASCAR Cup Series at Rockingham Speedway =

Auto race held at Rockingham, North Carolina

NASCAR Nextel Cup Series
- Venue: Rockingham Speedway
- Location: Rockingham, North Carolina, United States

Circuit information
- Surface: Asphalt
- Length: 1.017 mi (1.637 km)
- Turns: 4

Stock car racing events in the NASCAR Nextel Cup Series were annually held at Rockingham Speedway in Rockingham, North Carolina held during numerous seasons and times of year between 1965 and 2004.

== Spring race ==
Subway 400
- Corporate sponsor: Subway
- First race: 1966
- Last race: 2004
- Distance: 399.681 miles (643.224 km)
- Laps: 393
- Previous names: Peach Blossom 500 (1966); Carolina 500 (1967–1981, 1985); Warner W. Hodgdon Carolina 500 (1982–1984); Goodwrench 500 (1986–1995); Goodwrench Service 400 (1996–1997); GM Goodwrench Service Plus 400 (1998); Dura Lube/Big K 400 (1999); Dura Lube/Kmart 400 (2000); Dura Lube 400 (2001); Subway 400 (2002–2004)
- Most wins (driver): Richard Petty (7)
- Most wins (team): Petty Enterprises (7)
- Most wins (manufacturer): Ford (9)

The Subway 400 was the second race of the NASCAR Winston Cup Series season until 2004, held a week after the Daytona 500. This 400-mile (644 km) annual race was sponsored by Subway and was held at North Carolina Speedway (The Rock) since 1966. From 1966 to 1995, the race distance was 500 miles (805-km) which was shortened to 400 miles starting from the 1996 season.

Until the 2004 Nextel Cup season, two annual races were held at Rockingham. After the 2003 season, the fall race (the Pop Secret Microwave Popcorn 400) — which was held in November — was moved to California Speedway, to be held on the lucrative Labor Day weekend. This displaced the Mountain Dew Southern 500 at Darlington Raceway, which moved to November 2004 before being removed from the schedule completely (replaced by a second date at Texas Motor Speedway). The changes were part of the trend of less races being held in the southeast and a broader distribution across the United States. Though the spring date was not directly transferred to California, NASCAR moved up the first California race to the traditional spring Rockingham date the week after Daytona. This resulted in some criticism because teams had to travel cross-country for the second race as most spend two weeks in Daytona and are based in the Charlotte, North Carolina area. The draw for Rockingham was that teams got to stay close to home right after Daytona before traveling for the next race.

=== Past winners ===
Year	Date	No.	Driver	Team	Manufacturer	Race Distance		Race Time	Average Speed (mph)	Report	Ref
Year	Date	No.	Driver	Team	Manufacturer	Laps	Miles (km)	Race Time	Average Speed (mph)	Report	Ref
1966	March 13	99	Paul Goldsmith	Ray Nichels	Plymouth	500	500 (804.672)	4:59:55	100.027	Report	
1967	June 18	43	Richard Petty	Petty Enterprises	Plymouth	500	500 (804.672)	4:46:35	104.682	Report	
1968	June 16	27	Donnie Allison	Banjo Matthews	Ford	500	500 (804.672)	5:02:00	99.338	Report	
1969	March 9	17	David Pearson	Holman-Moody	Ford	500	500 (804.672)	4:52:22	102.569	Report	
1970	March 8	43	Richard Petty	Petty Enterprises	Plymouth	492	500.364 (805.257)	4:18:32	116.117	Report	
1971	March 14	43	Richard Petty	Petty Enterprises	Plymouth	492	500.364 (805.257)	4:12:55	118.696	Report	
1972	March 12	71	Bobby Isaac	Nord Krauskopf	Dodge	492	500.364 (805.257)	4:23:50	113.895	Report	
1973	March 18	21	David Pearson	Wood Brothers Racing	Mercury	492	500.364 (805.257)	4:13:01	118.649	Report	
1974	March 3	43	Richard Petty	Petty Enterprises	Dodge	443*	450.531 (725.059)	3:42:50	121.622	Report	
1975	March 2	11	Cale Yarborough	Junior Johnson & Associates	Chevrolet	492	500.364 (805.257)	4:15:18	117.588	Report	
1976	February 29	43	Richard Petty	Petty Enterprises	Dodge	492	500.364 (805.257)	4:24:08	113.665	Report	
1977	March 13	43	Richard Petty	Petty Enterprises	Dodge	492	500.364 (805.257)	5:06:46	97.86	Report	
1978	March 5	21	David Pearson	Wood Brothers Racing	Mercury	492	500.364 (805.257)	4:17:17	116.681	Report	
1979	March 4	15	Bobby Allison	Bud Moore Engineering	Ford	492	500.364 (805.257)	4:06:30	122.727	Report	
1980	March 9	11	Cale Yarborough	Junior Johnson & Associates	Oldsmobile	492	500.364 (805.257)	4:36:06	108.735	Report	
1981	March 1	11	Darrell Waltrip	Junior Johnson & Associates	Buick	492	500.364 (805.257)	4:21:59	114.594	Report	
1982	March 28	27	Cale Yarborough	M.C. Anderson Racing	Buick	492	500.364 (805.257)	4:03:27	108.992	Report	
1983	March 6/13*	43	Richard Petty	Petty Enterprises	Pontiac	492	500.364 (805.257)	4:25:30	113.055	Report	
1984	March 4	22	Bobby Allison	DiGard Motorsports	Buick	492	500.364 (805.257)	4:03:55	122.931	Report	
1985	March 3	12	Neil Bonnett	Junior Johnson & Associates	Chevrolet	492	500.364 (805.257)	4:21:10	114.953	Report	
1986	March 2	44	Terry Labonte	Billy Hagan	Oldsmobile	492	500.364 (805.257)	4:09:10	120.488	Report	
1987	March 1	3	Dale Earnhardt	Richard Childress Racing	Chevrolet	492	500.364 (805.257)	4:15:23	117.556	Report	
1988	March 6	75	Neil Bonnett	RahMoc Enterprises	Pontiac	492	500.364 (805.257)	4:09:51	120.159	Report	
1989	March 5	27	Rusty Wallace	Blue Max Racing	Pontiac	492	500.364 (805.257)	4:20:47	115.122	Report	
1990	March 4	42	Kyle Petty	SABCO Racing	Pontiac	492	500.364 (805.257)	4:04:21	122.864	Report	
1991	March 3	42	Kyle Petty	SABCO Racing	Pontiac	492	500.364 (805.257)	4:01:57	124.083	Report	
1992	March 1	11	Bill Elliott	Junior Johnson & Associates	Ford	492	500.364 (805.257)	3:58:02	126.125	Report	
1993	February 28	2	Rusty Wallace	Penske Racing	Pontiac	492	500.364 (805.257)	4:01:10	124.486	Report	
1994	February 27	2	Rusty Wallace	Penske Racing	Ford	492	500.364 (805.257)	3:59:43	125.239	Report	
1995	February 26	24	Jeff Gordon	Hendrick Motorsports	Chevrolet	492	500.364 (805.257)	3:59:15	125.305	Report	
1996	February 25	3	Dale Earnhardt	Richard Childress Racing	Chevrolet	393	399.681 (643.224)	3:30:26	113.959	Report	
1997	February 23	24	Jeff Gordon	Hendrick Motorsports	Chevrolet	393	399.681 (643.224)	3:17:35	121.371	Report	
1998	February 22	24	Jeff Gordon	Hendrick Motorsports	Chevrolet	393	399.681 (643.224)	3:24:51	117.065	Report	
1999	February 21	6	Mark Martin	Roush Racing	Ford	393	399.681 (643.224)	3:18:36	120.75	Report	
2000	February 27	18	Bobby Labonte	Joe Gibbs Racing	Pontiac	393	399.681 (643.224)	3:07:32	127.875	Report	
2001	February 25/26*	1	Steve Park	Dale Earnhardt, Inc.	Chevrolet	393	399.681 (643.224)	3:34:21	111.877	Report	
2002	February 24	17	Matt Kenseth	Roush Racing	Ford	393	399.681 (643.224)	3:27:40	115.478	Report	
2003	February 23	88	Dale Jarrett	Robert Yates Racing	Ford	393	399.681 (643.224)	3:23:29	117.852	Report	
2004	February 22	17	Matt Kenseth	Roush Racing	Ford	393	399.681 (643.224)	3:34:05	112.016	Report	

- 1974: Race shortened due to energy crisis.
- 1983: Race started on March 6; finished a week later on March 13 due to rain.
- 2001: Race started on Sunday but was finished on Monday due to rain.

=== Multiple winners (drivers) ===
# Wins	Driver	Years won
7	Richard Petty	1967, 1970, 1971, 1974, 1976, 1977, 1983
3	David Pearson	1969, 1973, 1978
3	Cale Yarborough	1975, 1980, 1982
3	Rusty Wallace	1989, 1993, 1994
3	Jeff Gordon	1995, 1997, 1998
2	Bobby Allison	1979, 1984
2	Neil Bonnett	1985, 1988
2	Kyle Petty	1990, 1991
2	Dale Earnhardt	1987, 1996
2	Matt Kenseth	2002, 2004

=== Multiple winners (manufacturers) ===
# Wins	Manufacturer	Years won
9	Ford	1968, 1969, 1979, 1992, 1994, 1999, 2002, 2003, 2004
8	Chevrolet	1975, 1985, 1987, 1995, 1996, 1997, 1998, 2001
7	Pontiac	1983, 1988, 1989, 1990, 1991, 1993, 2000
4	Plymouth	1966, 1967, 1970, 1971
4	Dodge	1972, 1974, 1976, 1977
3	Buick	1981, 1982, 1984
2	Mercury	1973, 1978
2	Oldsmobile	1980, 1986

== Fall race ==
Pop Secret Microwave Popcorn 400
- Venue: Rockingham Speedway
- Location: Rockingham, North Carolina, United States
- Corporate sponsor: Pop Secret
- First race: 1965
- Last race: 2003
- Distance: 399.681 miles (643.224 km)
- Laps: 393
- Previous names: American 500 (1965–1981); Warner W. Hodgdon American 500 (1982–1984); Nationwise 500 (1985–1986); AC Delco 500 (1987–1994); AC Delco 400 (1995–1998); Pop Secret Microwave Popcorn 400 (1999–2003)
- Most wins (driver): Richard Petty; Cale Yarborough (4)
- Most wins (team): Junior Johnson & Associates (8)
- Most wins (manufacturer): Ford (12)

The Pop Secret Microwave Popcorn 400 was a NASCAR Winston Cup Series event that took place in November at the North Carolina Motor Speedway from 1965 to 2003. It was the first NASCAR Cup Series victory for three drivers including Mark Martin in 1989, Ward Burton in 1995, and Johnny Benson in 2002. It was the final race win for Bill Elliott in 2003.

This race, typically run as the penultimate race of the NASCAR season, was dropped from the schedule after the 2003 season. The Pop Secret sponsorship was moved over to the newly acquired Labor Day date at Auto Club Speedway, while the late season date was originally taken over by the Southern 500 at Darlington and later the fall race at Texas.

=== Past winners ===
Year	Date	No.	Driver	Team	Manufacturer	Race Distance		Race Time	Average Speed (mph)	Report	Ref
Year	Date	No.	Driver	Team	Manufacturer	Laps	Miles (km)	Race Time	Average Speed (mph)	Report	Ref
1965	October 31	41	Curtis Turner	Wood Brothers Racing	Ford	500	500 (804.672)	4:54:17	101.942	Report	
1966	October 30	28	Fred Lorenzen	Holman-Moody	Ford	500	500 (804.672)	4:47:30	104.348	Report	
1967	October 29	11	Bobby Allison	Holman-Moody	Ford	500	500 (804.672)	5:04:49	98.42	Report	
1968	October 27	43	Richard Petty	Petty Enterprises	Plymouth	500	500 (804.672)	4:45:33	105.06	Report	
1969	October 26	98	LeeRoy Yarbrough	Junior Johnson & Associates	Ford	492	500.364 (805.257)	4:28:12	111.938	Report	
1970	November 15	21	Cale Yarborough	Wood Brothers Racing	Mercury	492	500.364 (805.257)	4:14:24	117.811	Report	
1971	October 24	43	Richard Petty	Petty Enterprises	Plymouth	492	500.364 (805.257)	4:24:43	113.405	Report	
1972	October 22	12	Bobby Allison	Richard Howard	Chevrolet	492	500.364 (805.257)	4:13:49	118.275	Report	
1973	October 21	21	David Pearson	Wood Brothers Racing	Mercury	492	500.364 (805.257)	4:14:57	117.749	Report	
1974	October 20	21	David Pearson	Wood Brothers Racing	Mercury	492	500.364 (805.257)	4:13:21	118.493	Report	
1975	October 19	11	Cale Yarborough	Junior Johnson & Associates	Chevrolet	492	500.364 (805.257)	4:09:54	120.129	Report	
1976	October 24	43	Richard Petty	Petty Enterprises	Dodge	492	500.364 (805.257)	4:15:01	117.718	Report	
1977	October 23	1	Donnie Allison	Ellington Racing	Chevrolet	492	500.364 (805.257)	4:24:18	113.584	Report	
1978	October 22	11	Cale Yarborough	Junior Johnson & Associates	Oldsmobile	492	500.364 (805.257)	4:15:58	117.288	Report	
1979	October 21	43	Richard Petty	Petty Enterprises	Chevrolet	492	500.364 (805.257)	4:37:04	108.356	Report	
1980	October 19	11	Cale Yarborough	Junior Johnson & Associates	Chevrolet	492	500.364 (805.257)	4:22:59	114.159	Report	
1981	November 1	11	Darrell Waltrip	Junior Johnson & Associates	Buick	492	500.364 (805.257)	4:39:32	107.399	Report	
1982	October 31	11	Darrell Waltrip	Junior Johnson & Associates	Buick	492	500.364 (805.257)	4:20:47	115.122	Report	
1983	October 30	44	Terry Labonte	Billy Hagan	Chevrolet	492	500.364 (805.257)	4:11:36	119.324	Report	
1984	October 21	9	Bill Elliott	Melling Racing	Ford	492	500.364 (805.257)	4:26:35	112.617	Report	
1985	October 20	11	Darrell Waltrip	Junior Johnson & Associates	Chevrolet	492	500.364 (805.257)	4:13:40	118.344	Report	
1986	October 19	12	Neil Bonnett	Junior Johnson & Associates	Chevrolet	492	500.364 (805.257)	3:57:33	126.381	Report	
1987	October 25	9	Bill Elliott	Melling Racing	Ford	492	500.364 (805.257)	4:13:52	118.258	Report	
1988	October 23	27	Rusty Wallace	Blue Max Racing	Pontiac	492	500.364 (805.257)	4:29:07	111.557	Report	
1989	October 22	6	Mark Martin	Roush Racing	Ford	492	500.364 (805.257)	4:23:10	114.079	Report	
1990	October 21	7	Alan Kulwicki	AK Racing	Ford	492	500.364 (805.257)	3:57:25	126.452	Report	
1991	October 20	28	Davey Allison	Robert Yates Racing	Ford	492	500.364 (805.257)	3:55:51	127.292	Report	
1992	October 25	42	Kyle Petty	SABCO Racing	Pontiac	492	500.364 (805.257)	3:49:37	130.748	Report	
1993	October 24	2	Rusty Wallace	Penske Racing	Pontiac	492	500.364 (805.257)	4:23:16	114.036	Report	
1994	October 23	3	Dale Earnhardt	Richard Childress Racing	Chevrolet	492	500.364 (805.257)	3:57:30	126.408	Report	
1995	October 22	22	Ward Burton	Bill Davis Racing	Pontiac	393	399.681 (643.224)	3:28:56	114.778	Report	
1996	October 20	10	Ricky Rudd	Rudd Performance; Motorsports	Ford	393	399.681 (643.224)	3:16:03	122.32	Report	
1997	October 27	43	Bobby Hamilton	Petty Enterprises	Pontiac	393	399.681 (643.224)	3:17:00	121.73	Report	
1998	November 1	24	Jeff Gordon	Hendrick Motorsports	Chevrolet	393	399.681 (643.224)	3:06:44	128.423	Report	
1999	October 24	99	Jeff Burton	Roush Racing	Ford	393	399.681 (643.224)	3:02:55	131.103	Report	
2000	October 22	88	Dale Jarrett	Robert Yates Racing	Ford	393	399.681 (643.224)	3:37:11	110.418	Report	
2001	November 4	33	Joe Nemechek	Andy Petree Racing	Chevrolet	393	399.681 (643.224)	3:05:59	128.941	Report	
2002	November 3	10	Johnny Benson Jr.	MB2 Motorsports	Pontiac	393	399.681 (643.224)	3:06:35	128.526	Report	
2003	November 9	9	Bill Elliott	Evernham Motorsports	Dodge	393	399.681 (643.224)	3:34:44	111.677	Report	

=== Multiple winners (drivers) ===
# Wins	Driver	Years won
4	Richard Petty	1968, 1971, 1976, 1979
4	Cale Yarborough	1970, 1975, 1978, 1980
3	Darrell Waltrip	1981–1982, 1985
3	Bill Elliott	1984, 1987, 2003
2	Bobby Allison	1967, 1972
2	David Pearson	1973–1974
2	Rusty Wallace	1988, 1993

=== Multiple winners (manufacturers) ===
# Wins	Manufacturer	Years won
12	Ford	1965–1967, 1969, 1984, 1987, 1989–1991, 1996, 1999–2000
11	Chevrolet	1972, 1975, 1977, 1979–1980, 1983, 1985–1986, 1994, 1998, 2001
6	Pontiac	1988, 1992–1993, 1995, 1997, 2002
3	Mercury	1970, 1973–1974
2	Plymouth	1968, 1971
2	Buick	1981–1982
2	Dodge	1976, 2003
