= 1992 Pepsi 400 =

15th race of the 1992 NASCAR Winston Cup Series

Race details
- Race 15 of 29 in the 1992 NASCAR Winston Cup Series
- The 1992 Pepsi 400 program cover, featuring Richard Petty.
- Date: July 4, 1992
- Official name: 34th Annual Pepsi 400
- Location: Daytona Beach, Florida, Daytona International Speedway
- Course: Permanent racing facility
- Course length: 2.5 miles (4.0 km)
- Distance: 160 laps, 400 mi (643.737 km)
- Scheduled distance: 160 laps, 400 mi (643.737 km)
- Average speed: 170.457 miles per hour (274.324 km/h)
- Attendance: 80,000

Pole position
Driver	Sterling Marlin	Junior Johnson & Associates
- Time: 47.527

Most laps led
Driver	Ernie Irvan	Morgan-McClure Motorsports
- Laps: 117

Winner
No. 4	Ernie Irvan	Morgan-McClure Motorsports

Television in the United States
- Network: ESPN
- Announcers: Bob Jenkins, Benny Parsons, Ned Jarrett

Radio in the United States
- Radio: Motor Racing Network

The 1992 Pepsi 400 was the 15th stock car race of the 1992 NASCAR Winston Cup Series season and the 34th iteration of the event. The race was held on Saturday, July 4, 1992, before an audience of 80,000 in Daytona Beach, Florida at Daytona International Speedway, a 2.5 miles (4.0 km) permanent triangular-shaped superspeedway. The race took the scheduled 160 laps to complete. At race's end, Morgan–McClure Motorsports driver Ernie Irvan would manage to dominate the majority of the race to take his fifth career NASCAR Winston Cup Series victory and his second victory of the season. To fill out the top three, Junior Johnson & Associates driver Sterling Marlin and Joe Gibbs Racing driver Dale Jarrett would finish second and third, respectively.

== Background ==
The layout of Daytona International Speedway, the venue where the race was held.

Daytona International Speedway is one of three superspeedways to hold NASCAR races, the other two being Indianapolis Motor Speedway and Talladega Superspeedway. The standard track at Daytona International Speedway is a four-turn superspeedway that is 2.5 miles (4.0 km) long. The track's turns are banked at 31 degrees, while the front stretch, the location of the finish line, is banked at 18 degrees.

=== Entry list ===
- (R) denotes rookie driver.

#	Driver	Team	Make	Sponsor
0	Delma Cowart	H. L. Waters Racing	Ford	Masters Inn Economy
1	Rick Mast	Precision Products Racing	Oldsmobile	Skoal
2	Rusty Wallace	Penske Racing South	Pontiac	Miller Genuine Draft
3	Dale Earnhardt	Richard Childress Racing	Chevrolet	GM Goodwrench Service Plus
4	Ernie Irvan	Morgan–McClure Motorsports	Chevrolet	Kodak
5	Ricky Rudd	Hendrick Motorsports	Chevrolet	Tide
6	Mark Martin	Roush Racing	Ford	Valvoline
7	Alan Kulwicki	AK Racing	Ford	Hooters
8	Dick Trickle	Stavola Brothers Racing	Ford	Snickers
9	Chad Little	Melling Racing	Ford	Melling Racing
10	Derrike Cope	Whitcomb Racing	Chevrolet	Purolator Filters
11	Bill Elliott	Junior Johnson & Associates	Ford	Budweiser
12	Hut Stricklin	Bobby Allison Motorsports	Chevrolet	Raybestos
15	Geoff Bodine	Bud Moore Engineering	Ford	Motorcraft
16	Wally Dallenbach Jr.	Roush Racing	Ford	Keystone
17	Darrell Waltrip	Darrell Waltrip Motorsports	Chevrolet	Western Auto
18	Dale Jarrett	Joe Gibbs Racing	Chevrolet	Interstate Batteries
21	Morgan Shepherd	Wood Brothers Racing	Ford	Citgo
22	Sterling Marlin	Junior Johnson & Associates	Ford	Maxwell House
23	Eddie Bierschwale	B&B Racing	Oldsmobile	SplitFire
25	Ken Schrader	Hendrick Motorsports	Chevrolet	Kodiak
26	Brett Bodine	King Racing	Ford	Quaker State
28	Davey Allison	Robert Yates Racing	Ford	Texaco, Havoline
30	Michael Waltrip	Bahari Racing	Pontiac	Pennzoil
31	Bobby Hillin Jr.	Team Ireland	Chevrolet	Spam
33	Harry Gant	Leo Jackson Motorsports	Oldsmobile	Skoal Bandit
37	Randy Porter	Porter Racing	Pontiac	Porter Racing
41	Greg Sacks	Larry Hedrick Motorsports	Chevrolet	Kellogg's Frosted Flakes
42	Kyle Petty	SABCO Racing	Pontiac	Mello Yello
43	Richard Petty	Petty Enterprises	Pontiac	STP
48	James Hylton	Hylton Motorsports	Pontiac	Rumple Furniture
49	Stanley Smith	BS&S Motorsports	Chevrolet	Ameritron Batteries
52	Jimmy Means	Jimmy Means Racing	Pontiac	Jimmy Means Racing
55	Ted Musgrave	RaDiUs Motorsports	Oldsmobile	Jasper Engines & Transmissions
59	Andy Belmont (R)	Pat Rissi Racing	Ford	FDP Brakes
66	Jimmy Hensley (R)	Cale Yarborough Motorsports	Ford	Phillips 66 TropArtic
68	Bobby Hamilton	TriStar Motorsports	Oldsmobile	Country Time
71	Dave Marcis	Marcis Auto Racing	Chevrolet	Wehrs Chevrolet
73	Phil Barkdoll	Barkdoll Racing	Oldsmobile	X-1R
85	Bobby Gerhart	Bobby Gerhart Racing	Chevrolet	Thomas Chevrolet
90	Charlie Glotzbach	Donlavey Racing	Ford	SplitFire
94	Terry Labonte	Hagan Racing	Oldsmobile	Sunoco
99	Brad Teague	Ball Motorsports	Chevrolet	Traffic Engineering Services

== Qualifying ==
Qualifying was split into two rounds. The first round was held on Thursday, July 2, at 2:30 p.m. EST. Each driver would have one lap to set a time. During the first round, the top 20 drivers in the round would be guaranteed a starting spot in the race. If a driver was not able to guarantee a spot in the first round, they had the option to scrub their time from the first round and try and run a faster lap time in a second round qualifying run, held on Friday, July 3, at 1:30 p.m. EST. As with the first round, each driver would have one lap to set a time. For this specific race, positions 21-40 would be decided on time, and depending on who needed it, a select amount of positions were given to cars who had not otherwise qualified but were high enough in owner's points; up to two provisionals were given. If needed, a past champion who did not qualify on either time or provisionals could use a champion's provisional, adding one more spot to the field.

Sterling Marlin, driving for Junior Johnson & Associates, would win the pole, setting a time of 47.527 and an average speed of 189.366 miles per hour (304.755 km/h) in the first round.

Three drivers would fail to qualify.

=== Full qualifying results ===
Pos.	#	Driver	Team	Make	Time	Speed
1	22	Sterling Marlin	Junior Johnson & Associates	Ford	47.527	189.366
2	43	Richard Petty	Petty Enterprises	Pontiac	47.629	188.961
3	28	Davey Allison	Robert Yates Racing	Ford	47.778	188.371
4	6	Mark Martin	Roush Racing	Ford	47.798	188.292
5	5	Ricky Rudd	Hendrick Motorsports	Chevrolet	47.861	188.045
6	4	Ernie Irvan	Morgan–McClure Motorsports	Chevrolet	47.907	187.864
7	26	Brett Bodine	King Racing	Ford	47.913	187.840
8	21	Morgan Shepherd	Wood Brothers Racing	Ford	47.984	187.563
9	30	Michael Waltrip	Bahari Racing	Pontiac	48.054	187.289
10	18	Dale Jarrett	Joe Gibbs Racing	Chevrolet	48.095	187.130
11	25	Ken Schrader	Hendrick Motorsports	Chevrolet	48.143	186.943
12	42	Kyle Petty	SABCO Racing	Pontiac	48.155	186.896
13	17	Darrell Waltrip	Darrell Waltrip Motorsports	Chevrolet	48.186	186.776
14	94	Terry Labonte	Hagan Racing	Ford	48.192	186.753
15	16	Wally Dallenbach Jr.	Roush Racing	Ford	48.249	186.532
16	33	Harry Gant	Leo Jackson Motorsports	Oldsmobile	48.283	186.401
17	15	Geoff Bodine	Bud Moore Engineering	Ford	48.307	186.308
18	90	Charlie Glotzbach	Donlavey Racing	Ford	48.311	186.293
19	1	Rick Mast	Precision Products Racing	Oldsmobile	48.330	186.220
20	11	Bill Elliott	Junior Johnson & Associates	Ford	48.353	186.131
Failed to lock in Round 1
21	49	Stanley Smith	BS&S Motorsports	Chevrolet	48.388	185.997
22	3	Dale Earnhardt	Richard Childress Racing	Chevrolet	48.448	185.766
23	66	Jimmy Hensley (R)	Cale Yarborough Motorsports	Ford	48.454	185.743
24	12	Hut Stricklin	Bobby Allison Motorsports	Chevrolet	48.486	185.621
25	68	Bobby Hamilton	TriStar Motorsports	Chevrolet	48.535	185.433
26	7	Alan Kulwicki	AK Racing	Ford	48.558	185.345
27	55	Ted Musgrave	RaDiUs Motorsports	Chevrolet	48.631	185.067
28	52	Jimmy Means	Jimmy Means Racing	Pontiac	48.650	184.995
29	2	Rusty Wallace	Penske Racing South	Pontiac	48.672	184.911
30	10	Derrike Cope	Whitcomb Racing	Chevrolet	48.710	184.767
31	41	Greg Sacks	Larry Hedrick Motorsports	Chevrolet	48.745	184.634
32	9	Chad Little	Melling Racing	Ford	48.851	184.234
33	8	Dick Trickle	Stavola Brothers Racing	Ford	48.862	184.192
34	31	Bobby Hillin Jr.	Team Ireland	Chevrolet	49.143	183.139
35	73	Phil Barkdoll	Barkdoll Racing	Oldsmobile	49.266	182.682
36	85	Bobby Gerhart	Bobby Gerhart Racing	Chevrolet	49.345	182.389
37	59	Andy Belmont (R)	Pat Rissi Racing	Ford	49.467	181.939
38	23	Eddie Bierschwale	B&B Racing	Oldsmobile	49.920	180.288
39	99	Brad Teague	Ball Motorsports	Chevrolet	50.588	177.908
40	71	Dave Marcis	Marcis Auto Racing	Chevrolet	51.212	175.740
Failed to qualify
41	0	Delma Cowart	H. L. Waters Racing	Ford	52.052	172.904
42	48	James Hylton	Hylton Motorsports	Chevrolet	52.470	171.527
43	37	Randy Porter	Porter Racing	Pontiac	-	-
Official first round qualifying results
Official starting lineup

== Race results ==
Fin	St	#	Driver	Team	Make	Laps	Led	Status	Pts	Winnings
1	6	4	Ernie Irvan	Morgan–McClure Motorsports	Chevrolet	160	117	running	185	$86,300
2	1	22	Sterling Marlin	Junior Johnson & Associates	Ford	160	2	running	175	$50,025
3	10	18	Dale Jarrett	Joe Gibbs Racing	Chevrolet	160	26	running	170	$37,200
4	17	15	Geoff Bodine	Bud Moore Engineering	Ford	160	0	running	160	$26,075
5	20	11	Bill Elliott	Junior Johnson & Associates	Ford	160	4	running	160	$26,500
6	11	25	Ken Schrader	Hendrick Motorsports	Chevrolet	160	0	running	150	$22,625
7	5	5	Ricky Rudd	Hendrick Motorsports	Chevrolet	160	2	running	151	$20,875
8	4	6	Mark Martin	Roush Racing	Ford	160	0	running	142	$19,325
9	29	2	Rusty Wallace	Penske Racing South	Pontiac	160	0	running	138	$18,325
10	3	28	Davey Allison	Robert Yates Racing	Ford	160	3	running	139	$23,075
11	15	16	Wally Dallenbach Jr.	Roush Racing	Ford	160	0	running	130	$8,915
12	7	26	Brett Bodine	King Racing	Ford	160	0	running	127	$14,350
13	13	17	Darrell Waltrip	Darrell Waltrip Motorsports	Chevrolet	159	0	running	124	$17,460
14	12	42	Kyle Petty	SABCO Racing	Pontiac	159	0	running	121	$13,720
15	23	66	Jimmy Hensley (R)	Cale Yarborough Motorsports	Ford	159	0	running	118	$11,280
16	27	55	Ted Musgrave	RaDiUs Motorsports	Chevrolet	159	0	running	115	$13,090
17	19	1	Rick Mast	Precision Products Racing	Oldsmobile	159	0	running	112	$12,675
18	24	12	Hut Stricklin	Bobby Allison Motorsports	Chevrolet	159	0	running	109	$12,160
19	8	21	Morgan Shepherd	Wood Brothers Racing	Ford	159	0	running	106	$11,745
20	18	90	Charlie Glotzbach	Donlavey Racing	Ford	159	0	running	103	$7,180
21	14	94	Terry Labonte	Hagan Racing	Ford	158	0	running	100	$11,160
22	21	49	Stanley Smith	BS&S Motorsports	Chevrolet	158	0	running	97	$6,140
23	16	33	Harry Gant	Leo Jackson Motorsports	Oldsmobile	158	0	running	94	$15,970
24	32	9	Chad Little	Melling Racing	Ford	158	0	running	91	$5,850
25	34	31	Bobby Hillin Jr.	Team Ireland	Chevrolet	158	0	running	88	$5,730
26	31	41	Greg Sacks	Larry Hedrick Motorsports	Chevrolet	157	0	running	85	$7,410
27	9	30	Michael Waltrip	Bahari Racing	Pontiac	156	0	running	82	$10,065
28	35	73	Phil Barkdoll	Barkdoll Racing	Oldsmobile	156	0	running	79	$5,295
29	39	99	Brad Teague	Ball Motorsports	Chevrolet	147	0	running	76	$5,200
30	26	7	Alan Kulwicki	AK Racing	Ford	144	1	running	78	$13,105
31	37	59	Andy Belmont (R)	Pat Rissi Racing	Ford	133	0	running	70	$5,300
32	40	71	Dave Marcis	Marcis Auto Racing	Chevrolet	130	0	engine	67	$6,670
33	25	68	Bobby Hamilton	TriStar Motorsports	Chevrolet	124	0	crash	64	$10,590
34	30	10	Derrike Cope	Whitcomb Racing	Chevrolet	122	0	crash	61	$6,535
35	33	8	Dick Trickle	Stavola Brothers Racing	Ford	122	0	crash	58	$6,480
36	2	43	Richard Petty	Petty Enterprises	Pontiac	84	5	fatigue	60	$10,925
37	36	85	Bobby Gerhart	Bobby Gerhart Racing	Chevrolet	58	0	fatigue	52	$4,870
38	38	23	Eddie Bierschwale	B&B Racing	Oldsmobile	45	0	quit	49	$4,855
39	28	52	Jimmy Means	Jimmy Means Racing	Pontiac	24	0	wheel bearing	46	$7,045
40	22	3	Dale Earnhardt	Richard Childress Racing	Chevrolet	7	0	engine	43	$16,355
Failed to qualify
41		0	Delma Cowart	H. L. Waters Racing	Ford					
42		48	James Hylton	Hylton Motorsports	Chevrolet					
43		37	Randy Porter	Porter Racing	Pontiac					
Official race results

== Standings after the race ==
Drivers' Championship standings

	Pos	Driver	Points
	1	Davey Allison	2,257
	2	Bill Elliott	2,211 (-46)
	3	Alan Kulwicki	2,123 (-134)
	4	Harry Gant	2,085 (–172)
	5	Dale Earnhardt	2,005 (–252)
1	6	Mark Martin	1,955 (–302)
1	7	Terry Labonte	1,941 (–316)
1	8	Geoff Bodine	1,905 (–352)
1	9	Ricky Rudd	1,872 (–385)
2	10	Morgan Shepherd	1,869 (–388)
Official driver's standings

- Note: Only the first 10 positions are included for the driver standings.

Previous race: 1992 Miller Genuine Draft 400 (Michigan)	NASCAR Winston Cup Series; 1992 season	Next race: 1992 Miller Genuine Draft 500
