= 1992 Miller Genuine Draft 400 (Michigan) =

14th race of the 1992 NASCAR Winston Cup Series

Race details
- Race 14 of 29 in the 1992 NASCAR Winston Cup Series
- The 1992 Miller Genuine Draft 400 program cover, featuring Rusty Wallace. Artwork by NASCAR artist Sam Bass.
- Date: June 21, 1992
- Official name: 24th Annual Miller Genuine Draft 400
- Location: Brooklyn, Michigan, Michigan International Speedway
- Course: Permanent racing facility
- Course length: 2 miles (3.2 km)
- Distance: 200 laps, 400 mi (643.737 km)
- Scheduled distance: 200 laps, 400 mi (643.737 km)
- Average speed: 152.672 miles per hour (245.702 km/h)
- Attendance: 105,000

Pole position
Driver	Davey Allison	Robert Yates Racing
- Time: 40.847

Most laps led
Driver	Davey Allison	Robert Yates Racing
- Laps: 158

Winner
No. 28	Davey Allison	Robert Yates Racing

Television in the United States
- Network: CBS
- Announcers: Ken Squier, Ned Jarrett, Chris Economaki

Radio in the United States
- Radio: Motor Racing Network

The 1992 Miller Genuine Draft 400 was the 14th stock car race of the 1992 NASCAR Winston Cup Series season and the 24th iteration of the event. The race was held on Sunday, June 21, 1992, before an audience of 105,000 in Brooklyn, Michigan, at Michigan International Speedway, a two-mile (3.2 km) moderate-banked D-shaped speedway. The race took the scheduled 200 laps to complete. At race's end, Robert Yates Racing driver Davey Allison would manage to dominate a majority of the race to take his 17th career NASCAR Winston Cup Series victory and his fourth victory of the season. To fill out the top three, owner-drivers Darrell Waltrip and Alan Kulwicki would finish second and third, respectively.

== Background ==
The layout of Michigan International Speedway, the venue where the race was held.

The race was held at Michigan International Speedway, a two-mile (3.2 km) moderate-banked D-shaped speedway located in Brooklyn, Michigan. The track is used primarily for NASCAR events. It is known as a "sister track" to Texas World Speedway as MIS's oval design was a direct basis of TWS, with moderate modifications to the banking in the corners, and was used as the basis of Auto Club Speedway. The track is owned by International Speedway Corporation. Michigan International Speedway is recognized as one of motorsports' premier facilities because of its wide racing surface and high banking (by open-wheel standards; the 18-degree banking is modest by stock car standards).

=== Entry list ===
- (R) denotes rookie driver.

#	Driver	Team	Make	Sponsor
1	Rick Mast	Precision Products Racing	Oldsmobile	Skoal
2	Rusty Wallace	Penske Racing South	Pontiac	Miller Genuine Draft
3	Dale Earnhardt	Richard Childress Racing	Chevrolet	GM Goodwrench Service Plus
4	Ernie Irvan	Morgan–McClure Motorsports	Chevrolet	Kodak
5	Ricky Rudd	Hendrick Motorsports	Chevrolet	Tide
6	Mark Martin	Roush Racing	Ford	Valvoline
7	Alan Kulwicki	AK Racing	Ford	Hooters
8	Dick Trickle	Stavola Brothers Racing	Ford	Snickers
9	Chad Little	Melling Racing	Ford	Melling Racing
10	Derrike Cope	Whitcomb Racing	Chevrolet	Purolator Filters
11	Bill Elliott	Junior Johnson & Associates	Ford	Budweiser
12	Hut Stricklin	Bobby Allison Motorsports	Chevrolet	Raybestos
15	Geoff Bodine	Bud Moore Engineering	Ford	Motorcraft
16	Wally Dallenbach Jr.	Roush Racing	Ford	Keystone
17	Darrell Waltrip	Darrell Waltrip Motorsports	Chevrolet	Western Auto
18	Dale Jarrett	Joe Gibbs Racing	Chevrolet	Interstate Batteries
21	Morgan Shepherd	Wood Brothers Racing	Ford	Citgo
22	Sterling Marlin	Junior Johnson & Associates	Ford	Maxwell House
25	Ken Schrader	Hendrick Motorsports	Chevrolet	Kodiak
26	Brett Bodine	King Racing	Ford	Quaker State
28	Davey Allison	Robert Yates Racing	Ford	Texaco, Havoline
30	Michael Waltrip*	Bahari Racing	Pontiac	Pennzoil
31	Bobby Hillin Jr.	Team Ireland	Chevrolet	Team Ireland
32	Jimmy Horton	Active Motorsports	Chevrolet	Active Trucking
33	Harry Gant	Leo Jackson Motorsports	Oldsmobile	Skoal Bandit
36	H. B. Bailey	Bailey Racing	Pontiac	Almeda Auto Parts
41	Greg Sacks	Larry Hedrick Motorsports	Chevrolet	Kellogg's Frosted Flakes
42	Kyle Petty	SABCO Racing	Pontiac	Mello Yello
43	Richard Petty	Petty Enterprises	Pontiac	STP
48	James Hylton	Hylton Motorsports	Pontiac	Valtrol Steam Traps
49	Stanley Smith	BS&S Motorsports	Chevrolet	Ameritron Batteries
52	Jimmy Means	Jimmy Means Racing	Pontiac	Jimmy Means Racing
53	Andy Genzman	Genzman Racing	Pontiac	De's L. P. Gas
55	Ted Musgrave	RaDiUs Motorsports	Oldsmobile	Jasper Engines & Transmissions
59	Andy Belmont (R)	Pat Rissi Racing	Ford	FDP Brakes
66	Jimmy Hensley (R)	Cale Yarborough Motorsports	Ford	Phillips 66 TropArtic
68	Bobby Hamilton	TriStar Motorsports	Oldsmobile	Country Time
71	Dave Marcis	Marcis Auto Racing	Chevrolet	Brach's Candies
77	Mike Potter	Balough Racing	Chevrolet	Kenova Golf Course Construction
89	Jim Sauter	Mueller Brothers Racing	Pontiac	Evinrude Outboard Motors
90	Charlie Glotzbach	Donlavey Racing	Ford	SplitFire
94	Terry Labonte	Hagan Racing	Oldsmobile	Sunoco

*Replaced by Ben Hess in second-round qualifying due to Waltrip suffering injuries in a crash during first-round qualifying. Waltrip would, however race in the event.

== Qualifying ==
Qualifying was split into two rounds. The first round was held on Thursday, June 19, at 3:00 PM EST. Each driver would have one lap to set a time. During the first round, the top 20 drivers in the round would be guaranteed a starting spot in the race. If a driver was not able to guarantee a spot in the first round, they had the option to scrub their time from the first round and try and run a faster lap time in a second round qualifying run, held on Saturday, June 20, at 11:00 AM EST. As with the first round, each driver would have one lap to set a time. For this specific race, positions 21-40 would be decided on time, and depending on who needed it, a select amount of positions were given to cars who had not otherwise qualified but were high enough in owner's points; up to two were given. If needed, a past champion who did not qualify on either time or provisionals could use a champion's provisional, adding one more spot to the field.

Davey Allison, driving for Robert Yates Racing, would win the pole, setting a time of 40.847 and an average speed of 176.268 miles per hour (283.676 km/h) in the first round.

Andy Genzman was the only driver to fail to qualify.

=== Full qualifying results ===
Pos.	#	Driver	Team	Make	Time	Speed
1	28	Davey Allison	Robert Yates Racing	Ford	40.847	176.268
2	6	Mark Martin	Roush Racing	Ford	41.167	174.897
3	11	Bill Elliott	Junior Johnson & Associates	Ford	41.185	174.821
4	7	Alan Kulwicki	AK Racing	Ford	41.284	174.402
5	31	Bobby Hillin Jr.	Team Ireland	Chevrolet	41.330	174.208
6	4	Ernie Irvan	Morgan–McClure Motorsports	Chevrolet	41.349	174.128
7	26	Brett Bodine	King Racing	Ford	41.355	174.102
8	2	Rusty Wallace	Penske Racing South	Pontiac	41.371	174.035
9	17	Darrell Waltrip	Darrell Waltrip Motorsports	Chevrolet	41.389	173.959
10	25	Ken Schrader	Hendrick Motorsports	Chevrolet	41.410	173.871
11	66	Jimmy Hensley (R)	Cale Yarborough Motorsports	Ford	41.459	173.666
12	5	Ricky Rudd	Hendrick Motorsports	Chevrolet	41.473	173.607
13	18	Dale Jarrett	Joe Gibbs Racing	Chevrolet	41.504	173.477
14	43	Richard Petty	Petty Enterprises	Pontiac	41.561	173.239
15	41	Greg Sacks	Larry Hedrick Motorsports	Chevrolet	41.561	173.239
16	68	Bobby Hamilton	TriStar Motorsports	Oldsmobile	41.604	173.060
17	42	Kyle Petty	SABCO Racing	Pontiac	41.605	173.056
18	33	Harry Gant	Leo Jackson Motorsports	Oldsmobile	41.613	173.023
19	21	Morgan Shepherd	Wood Brothers Racing	Ford	41.640	172.911
20	94	Terry Labonte	Hagan Racing	Oldsmobile	41.755	172.434
Failed to lock in Round 1
21	49	Stanley Smith	BS&S Motorsports	Chevrolet	41.340	174.165
22	3	Dale Earnhardt	Richard Childress Racing	Chevrolet	41.453	173.691
23	22	Sterling Marlin	Junior Johnson & Associates	Ford	41.498	173.502
24	8	Dick Trickle	Stavola Brothers Racing	Ford	41.586	173.135
25	90	Charlie Glotzbach	Donlavey Racing	Ford	41.780	172.331
26	55	Ted Musgrave	RaDiUs Motorsports	Ford	41.853	172.031
27	12	Hut Stricklin	Bobby Allison Motorsports	Chevrolet	41.863	171.990
28	1	Rick Mast	Precision Products Racing	Oldsmobile	41.880	171.920
29	89	Jim Sauter	Mueller Brothers Racing	Pontiac	41.942	171.666
30	15	Geoff Bodine	Bud Moore Engineering	Ford	41.966	171.567
31	16	Wally Dallenbach Jr.	Roush Racing	Ford	42.037	171.278
32	9	Chad Little	Melling Racing	Ford	42.249	170.418
33	71	Dave Marcis	Marcis Auto Racing	Chevrolet	42.252	170.406
34	52	Jimmy Means	Jimmy Means Racing	Pontiac	42.660	168.776
35	10	Derrike Cope	Whitcomb Racing	Chevrolet	42.806	168.201
36	77	Mike Potter	Balough Racing	Chevrolet	43.039	167.290
37	36	H. B. Bailey	Bailey Racing	Pontiac	43.316	166.220
38	59	Andy Belmont (R)	Pat Rissi Racing	Ford	43.530	165.403
39	48	James Hylton	Hylton Motorsports	Chevrolet	43.671	164.869
40	32	Jimmy Horton	Active Motorsports	Chevrolet	43.803	164.372
Provisional
41	30	Ben Hess	Bahari Racing	Pontiac	-	-
Failed to qualify
42	53	Andy Genzman	Genzman Racing	Pontiac	-*	-*
Official first round qualifying results
Official starting lineup

== Race results ==
Fin	St	#	Driver	Team	Make	Laps	Led	Status	Pts	Winnings
1	1	28	Davey Allison	Robert Yates Racing	Ford	200	158	running	185	$150,665
2	9	17	Darrell Waltrip	Darrell Waltrip Motorsports	Chevrolet	200	5	running	175	$47,840
3	4	7	Alan Kulwicki	AK Racing	Ford	200	23	running	170	$38,215
4	17	42	Kyle Petty	SABCO Racing	Pontiac	200	0	running	160	$25,265
5	12	5	Ricky Rudd	Hendrick Motorsports	Chevrolet	200	0	running	155	$25,760
6	2	6	Mark Martin	Roush Racing	Ford	200	10	running	155	$27,285
7	18	33	Harry Gant	Leo Jackson Motorsports	Oldsmobile	200	3	running	151	$23,910
8	26	55	Ted Musgrave	RaDiUs Motorsports	Ford	199	0	running	142	$18,910
9	22	3	Dale Earnhardt	Richard Childress Racing	Chevrolet	199	0	running	138	$23,110
10	3	11	Bill Elliott	Junior Johnson & Associates	Ford	199	1	running	139	$21,260
11	30	15	Geoff Bodine	Bud Moore Engineering	Ford	199	0	running	130	$16,210
12	19	21	Morgan Shepherd	Wood Brothers Racing	Ford	198	0	running	127	$15,635
13	10	25	Ken Schrader	Hendrick Motorsports	Chevrolet	198	0	running	124	$18,185
14	15	41	Greg Sacks	Larry Hedrick Motorsports	Chevrolet	198	0	running	121	$11,635
15	14	43	Richard Petty	Petty Enterprises	Pontiac	198	0	running	118	$14,285
16	25	90	Charlie Glotzbach	Donlavey Racing	Ford	198	0	running	115	$7,960
17	5	31	Bobby Hillin Jr.	Team Ireland	Chevrolet	197	0	running	112	$7,735
18	31	16	Wally Dallenbach Jr.	Roush Racing	Ford	197	0	running	109	$7,510
19	7	26	Brett Bodine	King Racing	Ford	196	0	running	106	$12,995
20	24	8	Dick Trickle	Stavola Brothers Racing	Ford	196	0	running	103	$10,280
21	32	9	Chad Little	Melling Racing	Ford	196	0	running	100	$6,860
22	35	10	Derrike Cope	Whitcomb Racing	Chevrolet	195	0	running	97	$8,945
23	34	52	Jimmy Means	Jimmy Means Racing	Pontiac	192	0	running	94	$8,635
24	13	18	Dale Jarrett	Joe Gibbs Racing	Chevrolet	191	0	running	91	$11,425
25	39	48	James Hylton	Hylton Motorsports	Chevrolet	188	0	running	88	$6,415
26	40	32	Jimmy Horton	Active Motorsports	Chevrolet	187	0	running	85	$6,255
27	41	30	Michael Waltrip	Bahari Racing	Pontiac	186	0	engine	82	$11,045
28	28	1	Rick Mast	Precision Products Racing	Oldsmobile	158	0	engine	79	$10,885
29	11	66	Jimmy Hensley (R)	Cale Yarborough Motorsports	Ford	157	0	flywheel	76	$8,425
30	6	4	Ernie Irvan	Morgan–McClure Motorsports	Chevrolet	157	0	running	73	$16,560
31	16	68	Bobby Hamilton	TriStar Motorsports	Oldsmobile	156	0	running	70	$11,430
32	23	22	Sterling Marlin	Junior Johnson & Associates	Ford	145	0	engine	67	$10,335
33	36	77	Mike Potter	Balough Racing	Chevrolet	112	0	valve	64	$5,680
34	38	59	Andy Belmont (R)	Pat Rissi Racing	Ford	104	0	clutch	61	$5,860
35	27	12	Hut Stricklin	Bobby Allison Motorsports	Chevrolet	91	0	valve	58	$10,090
36	33	71	Dave Marcis	Marcis Auto Racing	Chevrolet	75	0	engine	55	$7,020
37	8	2	Rusty Wallace	Penske Racing South	Pontiac	69	0	crank	52	$13,465
38	20	94	Terry Labonte	Hagan Racing	Oldsmobile	41	0	engine	49	$9,940
39	29	89	Jim Sauter	Mueller Brothers Racing	Pontiac	31	0	clutch	46	$5,415
40	21	49	Stanley Smith	BS&S Motorsports	Chevrolet	28	0	engine	43	$5,855
41	37	36	H. B. Bailey	Bailey Racing	Pontiac	8	0	valve	40	$5,355
Failed to qualify
42		53	Andy Genzman	Genzman Racing	Pontiac					
Official race results

== Standings after the race ==
Drivers' Championship standings

	Pos	Driver	Points
	1	Davey Allison	2,118
	2	Bill Elliott	2,051 (-67)
	3	Alan Kulwicki	2,045 (-73)
	4	Harry Gant	1,991 (–127)
	5	Dale Earnhardt	1,962 (–156)
	6	Terry Labonte	1,841 (–277)
	7	Mark Martin	1,813 (–305)
	8	Morgan Shepherd	1,763 (–355)
	9	Geoff Bodine	1,745 (–373)
1	10	Ricky Rudd	1,721 (–397)
Official driver's standings

- Note: Only the first 10 positions are included for the driver standings.

Previous race: 1992 Champion Spark Plug 500	NASCAR Winston Cup Series; 1992 season	Next race: 1992 Pepsi 400
