= 1992 DieHard 500 =

17th race of the 1992 NASCAR Winston Cup Series

Race details
- Race 17 of 29 in the 1992 NASCAR Winston Cup Series
- The 1992 DieHard 500 program cover, featuring Dale Earnhardt.
- Date: July 26, 1992
- Official name: 24th Annual DieHard 500
- Location: Lincoln, Alabama, Talladega Superspeedway
- Course: Permanent racing facility
- Course length: 2.66 miles (4.28 km)
- Distance: 188 laps, 500.08 mi (804.8 km)
- Scheduled distance: 188 laps, 500.08 mi (804.8 km)
- Average speed: 176.309 miles per hour (283.742 km/h)

Pole position
| Driver | Sterling Marlin | Junior Johnson & Associates |
- Time: 50.245

Most laps led
| Driver | Ricky Rudd | Hendrick Motorsports |
- Laps: 54

Winner
| No. 4 | Ernie Irvan | Morgan-McClure Motorsports |

Television in the United States
- Network: CBS
- Announcers: Ken Squier, Ned Jarrett

Radio in the United States
- Radio: Motor Racing Network

The 1992 DieHard 500 was the 17th stock car race of the 1992 NASCAR Winston Cup Series season and the 24th iteration of the event. The race was held on Sunday, July 26, 1992, in Lincoln, Alabama at Talladega Superspeedway, a 2.66 miles (4.28 km) permanent triangle-shaped superspeedway. The race took the scheduled 188 laps to complete. At race's end, Morgan–McClure Motorsports driver Ernie Irvan would manage to come back from a lap deficit and best out Junior Johnson & Associates driver Sterling Marlin by 19 thousandths of a second to take his sixth career NASCAR Winston Cup Series and his third and final victory of the season. To fill out the top three, the aforementioned Sterling Marlin and Robert Yates Racing driver Davey Allison would finish second and third, respectively.

With the help of relief driver Bobby Hillin Jr., Davey Allison would manage to retake the driver's championship lead after losing it in the previous race, leading second-place driver Bill Elliott by one point.

== Background ==
The layout of Talladega Superspeedway, the venue where the race was held.

Talladega Superspeedway, originally known as Alabama International Motor Superspeedway (AIMS), is a motorsport complex situated north of Talladega, Alabama. The facility occupies land that once formed part of the Anniston Air Force Base, within the city limits of Lincoln. Its configuration is that of a tri-oval, and it was constructed during the 1960s by the International Speedway Corporation, a company controlled by the France family.

The circuit is noted for its steep banking and for the distinctive placement of the start/finish line, positioned just beyond the exit of pit road. At present, the venue hosts events from major NASCAR national series, including the NASCAR Cup Series, the Xfinity Series, and the Camping World Truck Series. Measuring 2.66-mile-long (4.28 km), it is the longest oval used in NASCAR competition; its overall design is comparable to that of Daytona International Speedway, which is a 2.5-mile-long (4.0 km) tri-oval.

=== Entry list ===
- (R) denotes rookie driver.

| # | Driver | Team | Make | Sponsor |
|---|---|---|---|---|
| 0 | Delma Cowart | H. L. Waters Racing | Ford | Masters Inn Economy |
| 1 | Rick Mast | Precision Products Racing | Oldsmobile | Skoal |
| 2 | Rusty Wallace | Penske Racing South | Pontiac | Miller Genuine Draft |
| 3 | Dale Earnhardt | Richard Childress Racing | Chevrolet | GM Goodwrench Service Plus |
| 4 | Ernie Irvan | Morgan–McClure Motorsports | Chevrolet | Kodak |
| 5 | Ricky Rudd | Hendrick Motorsports | Chevrolet | Tide |
| 6 | Mark Martin | Roush Racing | Ford | Valvoline |
| 7 | Alan Kulwicki | AK Racing | Ford | Hooters |
| 8 | Dick Trickle | Stavola Brothers Racing | Ford | Snickers |
| 9 | Chad Little | Melling Racing | Ford | Melling Racing |
| 10 | Derrike Cope | Whitcomb Racing | Chevrolet | Purolator Filters |
| 11 | Bill Elliott | Junior Johnson & Associates | Ford | Budweiser |
| 12 | Hut Stricklin | Bobby Allison Motorsports | Chevrolet | Raybestos |
| 13 | Stan Fox | Folsom Racing | Chevrolet | Carrier "We're The Inside Guys." |
| 15 | Geoff Bodine | Bud Moore Engineering | Ford | Motorcraft |
| 16 | Wally Dallenbach Jr. | Roush Racing | Ford | Keystone |
| 17 | Darrell Waltrip | Darrell Waltrip Motorsports | Chevrolet | Western Auto |
| 18 | Dale Jarrett | Joe Gibbs Racing | Chevrolet | Interstate Batteries |
| 21 | Morgan Shepherd | Wood Brothers Racing | Ford | Citgo |
| 22 | Sterling Marlin | Junior Johnson & Associates | Ford | Maxwell House |
| 25 | Ken Schrader | Hendrick Motorsports | Chevrolet | Kodiak |
| 26 | Brett Bodine | King Racing | Ford | Quaker State |
| 28 | Davey Allison* | Robert Yates Racing | Ford | Texaco, Havoline |
| 30 | Michael Waltrip | Bahari Racing | Pontiac | Pennzoil |
| 33 | Harry Gant | Leo Jackson Motorsports | Oldsmobile | Skoal Bandit |
| 37 | Randy Porter | Porter Racing | Pontiac | Porter Racing |
| 41 | Greg Sacks | Larry Hedrick Motorsports | Chevrolet | Kellogg's Frosted Flakes |
| 42 | Kyle Petty | SABCO Racing | Pontiac | Mello Yello |
| 43 | Richard Petty | Petty Enterprises | Pontiac | STP |
| 49 | Stanley Smith | BS&S Motorsports | Chevrolet | Ameritron Batteries |
| 52 | Jimmy Means | Jimmy Means Racing | Pontiac | Williams Service |
| 55 | Ted Musgrave | RaDiUs Motorsports | Chevrolet | Jasper Engines & Transmissions |
| 56 | T. W. Taylor | Tierney Racing | Pontiac | Bell Motors |
| 59 | Andy Belmont (R) | Pat Rissi Racing | Ford | FDP Brakes |
| 66 | Jimmy Hensley (R) | Cale Yarborough Motorsports | Ford | Phillips 66 TropArtic |
| 68 | Bobby Hamilton | TriStar Motorsports | Chevrolet | Country Time |
| 71 | Dave Marcis | Marcis Auto Racing | Chevrolet | Southeastern Technology Group |
| 85 | Bobby Gerhart | Bobby Gerhart Racing | Chevrolet | Thomas Chevrolet |
| 90 | Charlie Glotzbach | Donlavey Racing | Ford | SplitFire |
| 94 | Terry Labonte | Hagan Racing | Ford | Sunoco |

*Due to injuries sustained in a crash at the 1992 Miller Genuine Draft 500, Allison was replaced by relief driver Bobby Hillin Jr. for qualifying. During the race itself, however, Allison took the start before again yielding the car to Hillin Jr.; because he officially started the event, Allison is credited with the finishing result.

== Qualifying ==
Qualifying was split into two rounds. The first round was held on Friday, July 24, at 4:00 PM EST. Each driver would have one lap to set a time. During the first round, the top 20 drivers in the round would be guaranteed a starting spot in the race. If a driver was not able to guarantee a spot in the first round, they had the option to scrub their time from the first round and try and run a faster lap time in a second round qualifying run, held on Saturday, July 25, at 10:00 AM EST. As with the first round, each driver would have one lap to set a time. For this specific race, positions 21-40 would be decided on time, and depending on who needed it, a select amount of positions were given to cars who had not otherwise qualified but were high enough in owner's points; up to two provisionals were given. If needed, a past champion who did not qualify on either time or provisionals could use a champion's provisional, adding one more spot to the field.

Sterling Marlin, driving for Junior Johnson & Associates, would win the pole, setting a time of 50.245 and an average speed of 190.586 miles per hour (306.718 km/h) in the first round.

No drivers would fail to qualify.

=== Full qualifying results ===
| Pos. | # | Driver | Team | Make | Time | Speed |
|---|---|---|---|---|---|---|
| 1 | 22 | Sterling Marlin | Junior Johnson & Associates | Ford | 50.245 | 190.586 |
| 2 | 5 | Ricky Rudd | Hendrick Motorsports | Chevrolet | 50.298 | 190.385 |
| 3 | 28 | Bobby Hillin Jr. | Robert Yates Racing | Ford | 50.332 | 190.257 |
| 4 | 43 | Richard Petty | Petty Enterprises | Pontiac | 50.438 | 189.857 |
| 5 | 26 | Brett Bodine | King Racing | Ford | 50.472 | 189.729 |
| 6 | 42 | Kyle Petty | SABCO Racing | Pontiac | 50.500 | 189.624 |
| 7 | 4 | Ernie Irvan | Morgan–McClure Motorsports | Chevrolet | 50.611 | 189.208 |
| 8 | 18 | Dale Jarrett | Joe Gibbs Racing | Chevrolet | 50.740 | 188.727 |
| 9 | 30 | Michael Waltrip | Bahari Racing | Pontiac | 50.742 | 188.720 |
| 10 | 21 | Morgan Shepherd | Wood Brothers Racing | Ford | 50.836 | 188.370 |
| 11 | 49 | Stanley Smith | BS&S Motorsports | Chevrolet | 50.837 | 188.367 |
| 12 | 9 | Chad Little | Melling Racing | Ford | 50.854 | 188.304 |
| 13 | 17 | Darrell Waltrip | Darrell Waltrip Motorsports | Chevrolet | 50.862 | 188.274 |
| 14 | 15 | Geoff Bodine | Bud Moore Engineering | Ford | 50.868 | 188.252 |
| 15 | 11 | Bill Elliott | Junior Johnson & Associates | Ford | 50.905 | 188.115 |
| 16 | 6 | Mark Martin | Roush Racing | Ford | 50.918 | 188.067 |
| 17 | 1 | Rick Mast | Precision Products Racing | Oldsmobile | 50.931 | 188.019 |
| 18 | 7 | Alan Kulwicki | AK Racing | Ford | 50.937 | 187.997 |
| 19 | 90 | Charlie Glotzbach | Donlavey Racing | Ford | 50.972 | 187.868 |
| 20 | 66 | Jimmy Hensley (R) | Cale Yarborough Motorsports | Ford | 51.064 | 187.529 |
Failed to lock in Round 1
| 21 | 94 | Terry Labonte | Hagan Racing | Ford | 51.112 | 187.353 |
| 22 | 16 | Wally Dallenbach Jr. | Roush Racing | Ford | 51.139 | 187.254 |
| 23 | 12 | Hut Stricklin | Bobby Allison Motorsports | Chevrolet | 51.178 | 187.112 |
| 24 | 10 | Derrike Cope | Whitcomb Racing | Chevrolet | 51.342 | 186.514 |
| 25 | 55 | Ted Musgrave | RaDiUs Motorsports | Chevrolet | 51.350 | 186.485 |
| 26 | 25 | Ken Schrader | Hendrick Motorsports | Chevrolet | 51.409 | 186.271 |
| 27 | 52 | Jimmy Means | Jimmy Means Racing | Pontiac | 51.428 | 186.202 |
| 28 | 2 | Rusty Wallace | Penske Racing South | Pontiac | 51.535 | 185.815 |
| 29 | 41 | Greg Sacks | Larry Hedrick Motorsports | Chevrolet | 51.541 | 185.794 |
| 30 | 3 | Dale Earnhardt | Richard Childress Racing | Chevrolet | 51.601 | 185.578 |
| 31 | 68 | Bobby Hamilton | TriStar Motorsports | Chevrolet | 51.605 | 185.563 |
| 32 | 33 | Harry Gant | Leo Jackson Motorsports | Oldsmobile | 51.739 | 185.083 |
| 33 | 8 | Dick Trickle | Stavola Brothers Racing | Ford | 51.955 | 184.313 |
| 34 | 85 | Bobby Gerhart | Bobby Gerhart Racing | Chevrolet | 51.991 | 184.186 |
| 35 | 71 | Dave Marcis | Marcis Auto Racing | Chevrolet | 52.154 | 183.610 |
| 36 | 13 | Stan Fox | Folsom Racing | Chevrolet | 52.617 | 181.994 |
| 37 | 59 | Andy Belmont (R) | Pat Rissi Racing | Ford | 53.014 | 180.632 |
| 38 | 0 | Delma Cowart | H. L. Waters Racing | Ford | 53.081 | 180.404 |
| 39 | 37 | Randy Porter | Porter Racing | Pontiac | 53.187 | 180.044 |
| 40 | 56 | T. W. Taylor | Tierney Racing | Pontiac | 53.874 | 177.748 |
Official first round qualifying results
Official starting lineup

== Race results ==
| Fin | St | # | Driver | Team | Make | Laps | Led | Status | Pts | Winnings |
|---|---|---|---|---|---|---|---|---|---|---|
| 1 | 7 | 4 | Ernie Irvan | Morgan–McClure Motorsports | Chevrolet | 188 | 41 | running | 180 | $81,815 |
| 2 | 1 | 22 | Sterling Marlin | Junior Johnson & Associates | Ford | 188 | 34 | running | 175 | $54,760 |
| 3 | 3 | 28 | Davey Allison | Robert Yates Racing | Ford | 188 | 30 | running | 170 | $42,845 |
| 4 | 2 | 5 | Ricky Rudd | Hendrick Motorsports | Chevrolet | 187 | 54 | running | 170 | $32,195 |
| 5 | 15 | 11 | Bill Elliott | Junior Johnson & Associates | Ford | 187 | 6 | running | 160 | $27,965 |
| 6 | 6 | 42 | Kyle Petty | SABCO Racing | Pontiac | 187 | 0 | running | 150 | $20,840 |
| 7 | 9 | 30 | Michael Waltrip | Bahari Racing | Pontiac | 187 | 0 | running | 146 | $18,640 |
| 8 | 12 | 9 | Chad Little | Melling Racing | Ford | 187 | 0 | running | 142 | $10,990 |
| 9 | 26 | 25 | Ken Schrader | Hendrick Motorsports | Chevrolet | 187 | 0 | running | 138 | $18,960 |
| 10 | 5 | 26 | Brett Bodine | King Racing | Ford | 187 | 7 | running | 139 | $17,530 |
| 11 | 28 | 2 | Rusty Wallace | Penske Racing South | Pontiac | 187 | 3 | running | 135 | $17,220 |
| 12 | 25 | 55 | Ted Musgrave | RaDiUs Motorsports | Chevrolet | 187 | 0 | running | 127 | $15,640 |
| 13 | 10 | 21 | Morgan Shepherd | Wood Brothers Racing | Ford | 187 | 0 | running | 124 | $14,520 |
| 14 | 22 | 16 | Wally Dallenbach Jr. | Roush Racing | Ford | 187 | 0 | running | 121 | $8,550 |
| 15 | 4 | 43 | Richard Petty | Petty Enterprises | Pontiac | 187 | 0 | running | 118 | $14,325 |
| 16 | 23 | 12 | Hut Stricklin | Bobby Allison Motorsports | Chevrolet | 187 | 0 | running | 115 | $13,740 |
| 17 | 32 | 33 | Harry Gant | Leo Jackson Motorsports | Oldsmobile | 186 | 0 | running | 112 | $18,075 |
| 18 | 21 | 94 | Terry Labonte | Hagan Racing | Ford | 186 | 0 | running | 109 | $13,170 |
| 19 | 29 | 41 | Greg Sacks | Larry Hedrick Motorsports | Chevrolet | 186 | 0 | running | 106 | $9,790 |
| 20 | 16 | 6 | Mark Martin | Roush Racing | Ford | 186 | 0 | running | 103 | $16,250 |
| 21 | 8 | 18 | Dale Jarrett | Joe Gibbs Racing | Chevrolet | 186 | 13 | running | 105 | $12,270 |
| 22 | 24 | 10 | Derrike Cope | Whitcomb Racing | Chevrolet | 186 | 0 | running | 97 | $9,090 |
| 23 | 13 | 17 | Darrell Waltrip | Darrell Waltrip Motorsports | Chevrolet | 186 | 0 | running | 94 | $16,460 |
| 24 | 31 | 68 | Bobby Hamilton | TriStar Motorsports | Chevrolet | 185 | 0 | running | 91 | $12,630 |
| 25 | 18 | 7 | Alan Kulwicki | AK Racing | Ford | 185 | 0 | running | 88 | $14,700 |
| 26 | 17 | 1 | Rick Mast | Precision Products Racing | Oldsmobile | 185 | 0 | running | 85 | $11,275 |
| 27 | 11 | 49 | Stanley Smith | BS&S Motorsports | Chevrolet | 185 | 0 | running | 82 | $6,555 |
| 28 | 33 | 8 | Dick Trickle | Stavola Brothers Racing | Ford | 185 | 0 | running | 79 | $8,085 |
| 29 | 35 | 71 | Dave Marcis | Marcis Auto Racing | Chevrolet | 184 | 0 | running | 76 | $7,990 |
| 30 | 19 | 90 | Charlie Glotzbach | Donlavey Racing | Ford | 184 | 0 | running | 73 | $6,345 |
| 31 | 20 | 66 | Jimmy Hensley (R) | Cale Yarborough Motorsports | Ford | 184 | 0 | running | 70 | $8,575 |
| 32 | 27 | 52 | Jimmy Means | Jimmy Means Racing | Pontiac | 181 | 0 | running | 67 | $7,730 |
| 33 | 39 | 37 | Randy Porter | Porter Racing | Pontiac | 180 | 0 | running | 64 | $6,135 |
| 34 | 34 | 85 | Bobby Gerhart | Bobby Gerhart Racing | Chevrolet | 179 | 0 | running | 61 | $6,090 |
| 35 | 40 | 56 | T. W. Taylor | Tierney Racing | Pontiac | 138 | 0 | piston | 58 | $6,045 |
| 36 | 36 | 13 | Stan Fox | Folsom Racing | Chevrolet | 102 | 0 | engine | 55 | $6,010 |
| 37 | 38 | 0 | Delma Cowart | H. L. Waters Racing | Ford | 100 | 0 | running | 52 | $5,985 |
| 38 | 14 | 15 | Geoff Bodine | Bud Moore Engineering | Ford | 76 | 0 | engine | 49 | $10,450 |
| 39 | 37 | 59 | Andy Belmont (R) | Pat Rissi Racing | Ford | 53 | 0 | engine | 46 | $6,155 |
| 40 | 30 | 3 | Dale Earnhardt | Richard Childress Racing | Chevrolet | 52 | 0 | engine | 43 | $18,140 |
Official race results

== Standings after the race ==
Drivers' Championship standings

| | Pos | Driver | Points |
|---|---|---|---|
| 1 | 1 | Davey Allison | 2,501 |
| 1 | 2 | Bill Elliott | 2,500 (-1) |
| | 3 | Alan Kulwicki | 2,381 (-120) |
| | 4 | Harry Gant | 2,372 (–129) |
| | 5 | Mark Martin | 2,208 (–293) |
| 2 | 6 | Ricky Rudd | 2,202 (–299) |
| | 7 | Terry Labonte | 2,142 (–336) |
| 2 | 8 | Dale Earnhardt | 2,142 (–359) |
| | 9 | Morgan Shepherd | 2,111 (–390) |
| 3 | 10 | Sterling Marlin | 2,106 (–395) |
Official driver's standings

- Note: Only the first 10 positions are included for the driver standings.

| Previous race: 1992 Miller Genuine Draft 500 | NASCAR Winston Cup Series; 1992 season | Next race: 1992 Budweiser at The Glen |
