= 1992 Miller Genuine Draft 500 =

16th race of the 1992 NASCAR Winston Cup Series

Race details
- Race 16 of 29 in the 1992 NASCAR Winston Cup Series
- The 1992 Miller Genuine Draft 500 program cover, featuring Rusty Wallace. Artwork by NASCAR artist Sam Bass.
- Date: July 19, 1992
- Official name: 20th Annual Miller Genuine Draft 500
- Location: Long Pond, Pennsylvania, Pocono Raceway
- Course: Permanent racing facility
- Course length: 2.5 miles (4.0 km)
- Distance: 200 laps, 500 mi (804.672 km)
- Scheduled distance: 200 laps, 500 mi (804.672 km)
- Average speed: 134.058 miles per hour (215.745 km/h)

Pole position
Driver	Davey Allison	Robert Yates Racing
- Time: 55.548

Most laps led
Driver	Davey Allison	Robert Yates Racing
- Laps: 116

Winner
No. 17	Darrell Waltrip	Darrell Waltrip Motorsports

Television in the United States
- Network: ESPN
- Announcers: Bob Jenkins, Benny Parsons, Ned Jarrett

Radio in the United States
- Radio: Motor Racing Network

The 1992 Miller Genuine Draft 500 was the 16th stock car race of the 1992 NASCAR Winston Cup Series season and the 20th iteration of the event. The race was held on Sunday, July 19, 1992, in Long Pond, Pennsylvania, at Pocono Raceway, a 2.5 miles (4.0 km) triangular permanent course. The race took the scheduled 200 laps to complete. Running on a fuel mileage call, owner-driver Darrell Waltrip would manage to conserve fuel for the last 42 laps of the race to take his 82nd career NASCAR Winston Cup Series victory and his first victory of the season. To fill out the top three, Leo Jackson Motorsports driver Harry Gant and owner-driver Alan Kulwicki would finish second and third, respectively.

On lap 150 of the race, driver's championship points leader, Robert Yates Racing driver Davey Allison would be involved in a crash when Darrell Waltrip tapped the left rear of Allison's vehicle, sending him sideways. The car would proceed to lift into the air, resulting in Allison's car flipping 11 times in a fast manner, before eventually landing upside-down, totaling Allison's car. Allison was taken to an Allentown, Pennsylvania hospital, where it was found that he had broken his right collarbone, both bones in his forearm, his right wrist, and had bruised his right eye socket. With the crash, Allison would lose the overall points lead to Bill Elliott.

== Background ==
The layout of Pocono International Raceway, the venue where the race was held.

The race was held at Pocono International Raceway, which is a three-turn superspeedway located in Long Pond, Pennsylvania. The track hosts two annual NASCAR Sprint Cup Series races, as well as one Xfinity Series and Camping World Truck Series event. Until 2019, the track also hosted an IndyCar Series race.

Pocono International Raceway is one of a very few NASCAR tracks not owned by either Speedway Motorsports, Inc. or International Speedway Corporation. It is operated by the Igdalsky siblings Brandon, Nicholas, and sister Ashley, and cousins Joseph IV and Chase Mattioli, all of whom are third-generation members of the family-owned Mattco Inc, started by Joseph II and Rose Mattioli.

Outside of the NASCAR races, the track is used throughout the year by Sports Car Club of America (SCCA) and motorcycle clubs as well as racing schools and an IndyCar race. The triangular oval also has three separate infield sections of racetrack – North Course, East Course and South Course. Each of these infield sections use a separate portion of the tri-oval to complete the track. During regular non-race weekends, multiple clubs can use the track by running on different infield sections. Also some of the infield sections can be run in either direction, or multiple infield sections can be put together – such as running the North Course and the South Course and using the tri-oval to connect the two.

=== Entry list ===
- (R) denotes rookie driver.

#	Driver	Team	Make	Sponsor
1	Rick Mast	Precision Products Racing	Oldsmobile	Skoal
2	Rusty Wallace	Penske Racing South	Pontiac	Miller Genuine Draft
3	Dale Earnhardt	Richard Childress Racing	Chevrolet	GM Goodwrench Service Plus
4	Ernie Irvan	Morgan–McClure Motorsports	Chevrolet	Kodak
5	Ricky Rudd	Hendrick Motorsports	Chevrolet	Tide
6	Mark Martin	Roush Racing	Ford	Valvoline
7	Alan Kulwicki	AK Racing	Ford	Hooters
8	Dick Trickle	Stavola Brothers Racing	Ford	Snickers
9	Chad Little	Melling Racing	Ford	Melling Racing
10	Derrike Cope	Whitcomb Racing	Chevrolet	Purolator Filters
11	Bill Elliott	Junior Johnson & Associates	Ford	Budweiser
12	Hut Stricklin	Bobby Allison Motorsports	Chevrolet	Raybestos
15	Geoff Bodine	Bud Moore Engineering	Ford	Motorcraft
16	Wally Dallenbach Jr.	Roush Racing	Ford	Keystone
17	Darrell Waltrip	Darrell Waltrip Motorsports	Chevrolet	Western Auto
18	Dale Jarrett	Joe Gibbs Racing	Chevrolet	Interstate Batteries
21	Morgan Shepherd	Wood Brothers Racing	Ford	Citgo
22	Sterling Marlin	Junior Johnson & Associates	Ford	Maxwell House
25	Ken Schrader	Hendrick Motorsports	Chevrolet	Kodiak
26	Brett Bodine	King Racing	Ford	Quaker State
27	Bob Schacht (R)	Linro Motorsports	Chevrolet	Linro Motorsports
28	Davey Allison	Robert Yates Racing	Ford	Texaco, Havoline
30	Michael Waltrip	Bahari Racing	Pontiac	Pennzoil
31	Bobby Hillin Jr.	Team Ireland	Chevrolet	Team Ireland
32	Jimmy Horton	Active Motorsports	Chevrolet	Active Trucking
33	Harry Gant	Leo Jackson Motorsports	Oldsmobile	Skoal Bandit
41	Greg Sacks	Larry Hedrick Motorsports	Chevrolet	Kellogg's Frosted Flakes
42	Kyle Petty	SABCO Racing	Pontiac	Mello Yello
43	Richard Petty	Petty Enterprises	Pontiac	STP
48	James Hylton	Hylton Motorsports	Pontiac	Valtrol Steam Traps
52	Jimmy Means	Jimmy Means Racing	Pontiac	Jimmy Means Racing
55	Ted Musgrave	RaDiUs Motorsports	Oldsmobile	Jasper Engines & Transmissions
59	Andy Belmont (R)	Pat Rissi Racing	Ford	FDP Brakes
65	Jerry O'Neil	Aroneck Racing	Oldsmobile	Aroneck Racing
66	Jimmy Hensley (R)	Cale Yarborough Motorsports	Ford	Phillips 66 TropArtic
68	Bobby Hamilton	TriStar Motorsports	Oldsmobile	Country Time
71	Dave Marcis	Marcis Auto Racing	Chevrolet	Marcis Auto Racing
77	Mike Potter	Balough Racing	Chevrolet	Kenova Golf Course Construction
83	Lake Speed	Speed Racing	Ford	Purex
85	Mike Skinner	Mansion Motorsports	Chevrolet	Glidden
94	Terry Labonte	Hagan Racing	Oldsmobile	Sunoco

== Qualifying ==
Qualifying was originally scheduled to be split into two rounds. The first round was scheduled to be held on Friday, July 17, at 3:00 PM EST. However, due to fog, the first round was cancelled, and qualifying was condensed into one round, which was held on Saturday, July 18, at 10:30 AM EST. Each driver would have one lap to set a time. For this specific race, positions 1–40 would be decided on time, and depending on who needed it, a select amount of positions were given to cars who had not otherwise qualified but were high enough in owner's points; up to two provisionals were given. If needed, a past champion who did not qualify on either time or provisionals could use a champion's provisional, adding one more spot to the field.

Davey Allison, driving for Robert Yates Racing, would win the pole, setting a time of 55.548 and an average speed of 162.022 miles per hour (260.749 km/h).

No drivers would fail to qualify.

=== Full qualifying results ===
Pos.	#	Driver	Team	Make	Time	Speed
1	28	Davey Allison	Robert Yates Racing	Ford	55.548	162.022
2	5	Ricky Rudd	Hendrick Motorsports	Chevrolet	55.719	161.525
3	6	Mark Martin	Roush Racing	Ford	55.781	161.345
4	4	Ernie Irvan	Morgan–McClure Motorsports	Chevrolet	55.812	161.256
5	25	Ken Schrader	Hendrick Motorsports	Chevrolet	55.916	160.956
6	16	Wally Dallenbach Jr.	Roush Racing	Ford	55.975	160.786
7	43	Richard Petty	Petty Enterprises	Pontiac	56.003	160.706
8	17	Darrell Waltrip	Darrell Waltrip Motorsports	Chevrolet	56.029	160.631
9	21	Morgan Shepherd	Wood Brothers Racing	Ford	56.032	160.623
10	7	Alan Kulwicki	AK Racing	Ford	56.051	160.568
11	41	Greg Sacks	Larry Hedrick Motorsports	Chevrolet	56.125	160.356
12	26	Brett Bodine	King Racing	Ford	56.130	160.342
13	42	Kyle Petty	SABCO Racing	Pontiac	56.135	160.328
14	22	Sterling Marlin	Junior Johnson & Associates	Ford	56.175	160.214
15	10	Derrike Cope	Whitcomb Racing	Chevrolet	56.187	160.179
16	11	Bill Elliott	Junior Johnson & Associates	Ford	56.221	160.083
17	66	Jimmy Hensley (R)	Cale Yarborough Motorsports	Ford	56.229	160.060
18	18	Dale Jarrett	Joe Gibbs Racing	Chevrolet	56.231	160.054
19	2	Rusty Wallace	Penske Racing South	Pontiac	56.254	159.989
20	8	Dick Trickle	Stavola Brothers Racing	Ford	56.326	159.784
21	15	Geoff Bodine	Bud Moore Engineering	Ford	56.330	159.773
22	33	Harry Gant	Leo Jackson Motorsports	Oldsmobile	56.340	159.744
23	12	Hut Stricklin	Bobby Allison Motorsports	Chevrolet	56.450	159.433
24	68	Bobby Hamilton	TriStar Motorsports	Oldsmobile	56.529	159.210
25	1	Rick Mast	Precision Products Racing	Oldsmobile	56.558	159.129
26	9	Chad Little	Melling Racing	Ford	56.635	158.912
27	55	Ted Musgrave	RaDiUs Motorsports	Ford	56.657	158.851
28	30	Michael Waltrip	Bahari Racing	Pontiac	56.754	158.579
29	3	Dale Earnhardt	Richard Childress Racing	Chevrolet	56.781	158.504
30	31	Bobby Hillin Jr.	Team Ireland	Chevrolet	57.132	157.530
31	83	Lake Speed	Speed Racing	Ford	57.240	157.233
32	71	Dave Marcis	Marcis Auto Racing	Chevrolet	57.522	156.462
33	65	Jerry O'Neil	Aroneck Racing	Oldsmobile	57.808	155.688
34	85	Mike Skinner	Mansion Motorsports	Chevrolet	57.920	155.387
35	32	Jimmy Horton	Active Motorsports	Chevrolet	57.967	155.261
36	27	Bob Schacht (R)	Linro Motorsports	Chevrolet	58.241	154.530
37	77	Mike Potter	Balough Racing	Chevrolet	58.681	153.372
38	59	Andy Belmont (R)	Pat Rissi Racing	Ford	58.918	152.755
39	52	Jimmy Means	Jimmy Means Racing	Pontiac	59.060	152.387
40	48	James Hylton	Hylton Motorsports	Pontiac	59.815	150.464
Provisional
41	94	Terry Labonte	Hagan Racing	Oldsmobile	-	-
Official starting lineup

== Race results ==
Fin	St	#	Driver	Team	Make	Laps	Led	Status	Pts	Winnings
1	8	17	Darrell Waltrip	Darrell Waltrip Motorsports	Chevrolet	200	12	running	180	$63,445
2	22	33	Harry Gant	Leo Jackson Motorsports	Oldsmobile	200	1	running	175	$40,520
3	10	7	Alan Kulwicki	AK Racing	Ford	200	58	running	170	$42,095
4	2	5	Ricky Rudd	Hendrick Motorsports	Chevrolet	200	0	running	160	$24,695
5	27	55	Ted Musgrave	RaDiUs Motorsports	Ford	200	8	running	160	$22,365
6	3	6	Mark Martin	Roush Racing	Ford	200	0	running	150	$19,040
7	13	42	Kyle Petty	SABCO Racing	Pontiac	200	4	running	151	$15,890
8	12	26	Brett Bodine	King Racing	Ford	200	0	running	142	$14,290
9	20	8	Dick Trickle	Stavola Brothers Racing	Ford	200	0	running	138	$10,690
10	18	18	Dale Jarrett	Joe Gibbs Racing	Chevrolet	200	0	running	134	$15,190
11	14	22	Sterling Marlin	Junior Johnson & Associates	Ford	199	0	running	130	$12,640
12	5	25	Ken Schrader	Hendrick Motorsports	Chevrolet	199	0	running	127	$15,590
13	16	11	Bill Elliott	Junior Johnson & Associates	Ford	199	2	running	129	$14,390
14	17	66	Jimmy Hensley (R)	Cale Yarborough Motorsports	Ford	199	0	running	121	$9,640
15	9	21	Morgan Shepherd	Wood Brothers Racing	Ford	199	0	running	118	$11,640
16	41	94	Terry Labonte	Hagan Racing	Oldsmobile	199	0	running	115	$11,090
17	26	9	Chad Little	Melling Racing	Ford	199	0	running	112	$5,790
18	19	2	Rusty Wallace	Penske Racing South	Pontiac	199	0	running	109	$13,690
19	15	10	Derrike Cope	Whitcomb Racing	Chevrolet	199	0	running	106	$7,540
20	7	43	Richard Petty	Petty Enterprises	Pontiac	199	0	running	103	$11,015
21	23	12	Hut Stricklin	Bobby Allison Motorsports	Chevrolet	199	0	running	100	$10,040
22	24	68	Bobby Hamilton	TriStar Motorsports	Oldsmobile	199	0	running	97	$10,840
23	29	3	Dale Earnhardt	Richard Childress Racing	Chevrolet	199	0	running	94	$16,540
24	25	1	Rick Mast	Precision Products Racing	Oldsmobile	197	0	running	91	$9,590
25	30	31	Bobby Hillin Jr.	Team Ireland	Chevrolet	197	0	running	88	$4,890
26	28	30	Michael Waltrip	Bahari Racing	Pontiac	197	0	running	85	$9,440
27	37	77	Mike Potter	Balough Racing	Chevrolet	193	0	running	82	$4,790
28	38	59	Andy Belmont (R)	Pat Rissi Racing	Ford	193	0	running	79	$4,990
29	11	41	Greg Sacks	Larry Hedrick Motorsports	Chevrolet	180	0	running	76	$6,265
30	21	15	Geoff Bodine	Bud Moore Engineering	Ford	171	0	ignition	73	$9,190
31	32	71	Dave Marcis	Marcis Auto Racing	Chevrolet	161	0	engine	70	$6,115
32	6	16	Wally Dallenbach Jr.	Roush Racing	Ford	165	0	handling	67	$4,540
33	1	28	Davey Allison	Robert Yates Racing	Ford	149	115	crash	74	$21,365
34	35	32	Jimmy Horton	Active Motorsports	Chevrolet	130	0	rear end	61	$4,365
35	33	65	Jerry O'Neil	Aroneck Racing	Oldsmobile	113	0	oil leak	58	$4,290
36	31	83	Lake Speed	Speed Racing	Ford	89	0	engine	55	$4,215
37	4	4	Ernie Irvan	Morgan–McClure Motorsports	Chevrolet	74	0	valve	52	$13,740
38	36	27	Bob Schacht (R)	Linro Motorsports	Chevrolet	58	0	transmission	49	$4,100
39	39	52	Jimmy Means	Jimmy Means Racing	Pontiac	24	0	steering	46	$5,565
40	40	48	James Hylton	Hylton Motorsports	Pontiac	17	0	quit	43	$3,990
41	34	85	Mike Skinner	Mansion Motorsports	Chevrolet	0	0	transmission	0	$3,990
Official race results

== Standings after the race ==
Drivers' Championship standings

	Pos	Driver	Points
1	1	Bill Elliott	2,340
1	2	Davey Allison	2,331 (-9)
	3	Alan Kulwicki	2,293 (-47)
	4	Harry Gant	2,260 (–80)
1	5	Mark Martin	2,105 (–235)
1	6	Dale Earnhardt	2,099 (–241)
	7	Terry Labonte	2,056 (–284)
1	8	Ricky Rudd	2,032 (–308)
1	9	Morgan Shepherd	1,987 (–353)
2	10	Geoff Bodine	1,978 (–362)
Official driver's standings

- Note: Only the first 10 positions are included for the driver standings.

Previous race: 1992 Pepsi 400	NASCAR Winston Cup Series; 1992 season	Next race: 1992 DieHard 500
