= Beau Petty =

NASCAR team owner

Beau Petty owned NASCAR Busch Grand National and NASCAR Winston Cup Series teams from 1996 through 2001. Race and test drivers included Bobby Hillin Jr., Stanton Barrett, Gus Wasson, Ryan Newman, Kenny Hendrick, Mark McFarland, Ken Bouchard, and Greg Sacks.

Prior to racing, Beau Petty served with the 3rd AD in the Gulf War and was an actor. In addition to a screen role in a pilot for FOX that did not get picked up as a series, he appeared in more than 50 commercials for companies including McDonald's, K-Mart, Exide Batteries, Quaker State, Slick 50, and NBC. He also was NASCAR racing legend Jeff Gordon's double in multiple commercials from 1995–1996.

== Personal life ==
Beau Petty has one child, Alexis Petty.
