= Mark McFarland =

American racing driver and crew chief

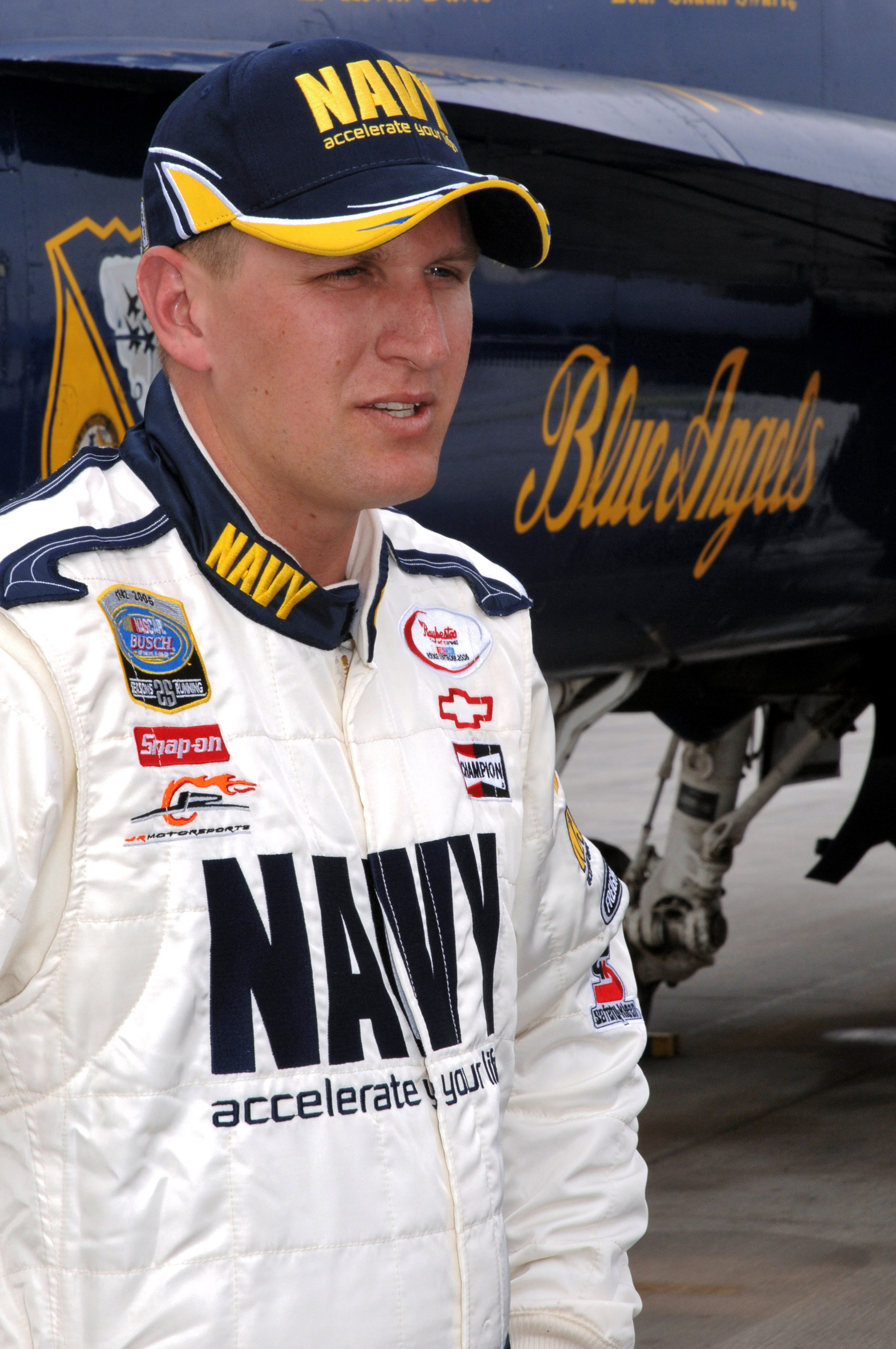
- McFarland at Naval Air Facility El Centro in 2006
- Born: Mark M. McFarland; February 1, 1978 (age 48); Winchester, Virginia, U.S.
- Achievements: 2003 Dodge Weekly Series Champion; 2008 Hooters Pro Cup Series Southern Division Champion

NASCAR O'Reilly Auto Parts Series career
- 31 races run over 6 years
- Best finish: 30th (2006)
- First race: 1998 Gumout Long Life Formula 200 (Loudon)
- Last race: 2006 Kroger 200 (IRP)
Wins	Top tens	Poles
0	1	0

NASCAR FedEx Freight Truck Series career
- 11 races run over 3 years
- Best finish: 36th (2004)
- First race: 2003 Virginia Is For Lovers 200 (Richmond)
- Last race: 2005 Silverado 350K (Texas)
Wins	Top tens	Poles
0	1	0
- Statistics up to date as of November 25, 2012.

Mark M. McFarland (born February 1, 1978) is an American former NASCAR driver and current crew chief. He last worked for Spire Motorsports as the crew chief of their No. 77 Chevrolet SS in the ARCA Menards Series driven by Corey Day. In 2021, he won championships in both the ARCA Menards Series and ARCA Menards Series East with Ty Gibbs and Sammy Smith, respectively, as crew chief of the Joe Gibbs Racing No. 18 car. In 2022, he and Smith won their second consecutive East Series championship, with the No. 18 car as a Kyle Busch Motorsports entry.

== Racing career ==
=== Early career ===
McFarland's first LMSC win in 1996

At the age of eight, McFarland began his racing career, racing go-karts. He earned a factory ride after his first year of racing. In 1994, his karting career ended with ten National Championships and fourteen state championships to his name.

At the end of 1995, McFarland started racing late models at Old Dominion Speedway in Manassas, Virginia. He was rookie of the year in 1996, and finished third in points. In the 1997 season, he captured nine wins, and 27 top-ten finishes, at several tracks throughout the south. He finished second at points at Old Dominion.

=== Weekly series ===
In 2003, driving an asphalt late model stock car, McFarland won sixteen of his eighteenth starts at Old Dominion Speedway in Manassas, Virginia. This earned him the national championship of the NASCAR Weekly Series, as well as the track championship.

As part of the 25th anniversary of the NASCAR Weekly Series in 2006, McFarland was named one of the series' All Time Top 25 drivers.

=== National series ===
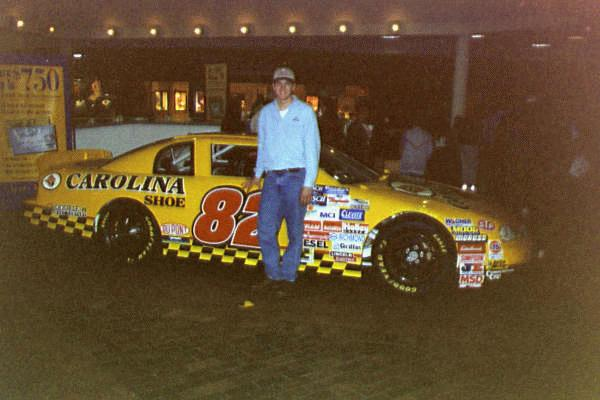
McFarland's 1998 Carolina Shoe Chevy

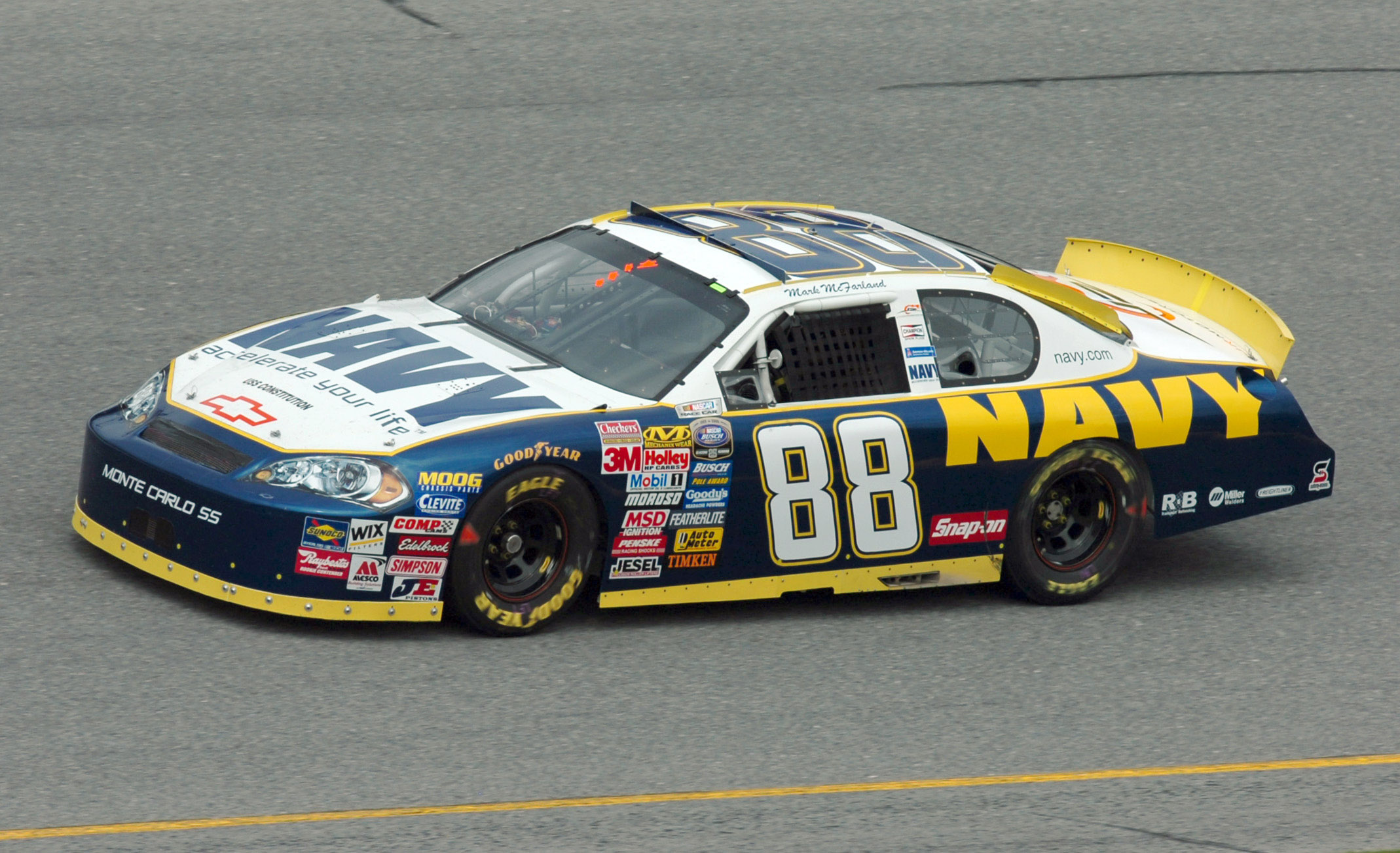
McFarland piloting the No. 88 in 2006

In 1998, McFarland ran select NASCAR Busch Series events, along with fifteen late model races throughout the east coast. He qualified for several Busch Series events. In 1999, he did not run any NASCAR events, but finished fourth in points at Old Dominion, and set a new track and LMSC record of 15.222 (88.687 MPH), which still stands today. He continued to run late model and off and on Busch Series events through the 2003 season, when he won the national championship for LMSC in NASCAR. In 2004, he raced first for Jim Harris in the Craftsman Truck Series in the Harris Trucking Dodge. Then about mid season, he was picked to be one of the 4 Hungry Driver drivers in Tommy Baldwin Racing's No. 6 Busch Series Dodge's.

McFarland then moved into the USAR Hooters Pro Cup Series in 2005 driving the Winfuel No. 32 Chevy for Dale Earnhardt Jr. Ken Barlow hand-picked Jefferson Hodges as the teams crew chief, saying, "Jefferson did a fabulous job building and leading this new team with knowledge and a true craftsmanship".

In 2006, McFarland was hired to drive the No. 88 United States Navy Chevrolet for JR Motorsports in the NASCAR Busch Series. He was injured while running in the top 10 at the Milwaukee Mile and missed the next two races at Daytona International Speedway and Chicagoland Speedway. He had dislocated his shoulder and also injured some of the muscles around it.

Following the Kroger 200, McFarland was released from his driving duties of the No. 88 U.S. Navy Chevrolet. Martin Truex Jr. would drive the car in the next race at Watkins Glen International and Robby Gordon drove it in subsequent races at Michigan International Speedway and California Speedway. Shane Huffman, also from the Hooters Pro Cup Series, drove the remaining races in the No. 88.

=== Crew chiefing career ===
McFarland served as a crew chief for Ben Rhodes when Rhodes won the 2014 NASCAR K&N Pro Series East season. For 2015, McFarland served as crew chief for Justin Haley's East Series team.

McFarland served as the general manager for his partly-owned team, MDM Motorsports, for two years. The team would close down prior to the 2019 season. McFarland would then join Joe Gibbs Racing as the team's crew chief for its ARCA Menards Series No. 18 car, driven by Riley Herbst, Ty Gibbs and Todd Gilliland. He won the 2021 main ARCA Series championship with Gibbs and the 2021 ARCA Menards Series East championship with Sammy Smith. In 2022, McFarland remained the crew chief of the No. 18 car in ARCA, now owned by Kyle Busch Motorsports. With Ty Gibbs moving up to the Xfinity Series full-time in 2022, Drew Dollar and Sammy Smith shared the car in the main ARCA Series and Smith drove the car full-time in the East Series. Smith and McFarland won their second consecutive East Series championship together that year.

On January 9, 2025, it was announced that McFarland would move to Spire Motorsports in 2025 to crew chief their new ARCA entry, the No. 77 car, driven by Corey Day, a Hendrick Motorsports development driver.

== Personal life ==
McFarland now lives in Harrisonburg, Virginia with his wife and three sons. He and his wife Kitty opened a Nothing Bundt Cakes bakery location in the town in 2023. They followed in the footsteps of NASCAR on Fox pit reporter Jamie Little, who is also a Nothing Bundt Cakes franchise owner in the Indianapolis area.

== Motorsports career results ==
=== NASCAR ===
(key) (Bold – Pole position awarded by qualifying time. Italics – Pole position earned by points standings or practice time. * – Most laps led.)

==== Busch Series ====
NASCAR Busch Series results
Year	Team	No.	Make	1	2	3	4	5	6	7	8	9	10	11	12	13	14	15	16	17	18	19	20	21	22	23	24	25	26	27	28	29	30	31	32	33	34	35	NBSC	Pts	Ref
1998	McFarland Racing	82	Chevy	DAY	CAR	LVS	NSV	DAR	BRI	TEX	HCY	TAL	NHA; 37	NZH; 29	CLT	DOV	RCH; 29	PPR	GLN	MLW; 34	MYB	CAL	SBO	IRP; DNQ	MCH	BRI	DAR	RCH; DNQ	DOV	CLT	GTY	CAR	ATL	HOM					68th	265	
2000	Petty-Huggins Motorsports	96	Chevy	DAY	CAR	LVS	ATL	DAR	BRI	TEX	NSV	TAL	CAL	RCH	NHA	CLT	DOV	SBO	MYB	GLN	MLW	NZH	PPR	GTY	IRP	MCH	BRI	DAR	RCH; 38	DOV	CLT	CAR	MEM	PHO					111th	49	
2000	Petty-Huggins Motorsports	84	Chevy																																HOM; DNQ				111th	49	
2001	Joe Gibbs Racing	20	Pontiac	DAY	CAR	LVS	ATL	DAR	BRI	TEX	NSH	TAL	CAL	RCH	NHA	NZH	CLT	DOV	KEN	MLW	GLN	CHI	GTY	PPR	IRP	MCH	BRI	DAR	RCH; 20	DOV	KAN	CLT	MEM	PHO	CAR	HOM			103rd	103	
2004	Tommy Baldwin Racing	6	Dodge	DAY	CAR	LVS	DAR	BRI	TEX	NSH	TAL	CAL	GTY	RCH	NZH	CLT; 22	DOV; 23	NSH	KEN	MLW	DAY	CHI	NHA	PPR	IRP	MCH	BRI	CAL	RCH; 16	DOV	KAN	CLT	MEM	ATL	PHO	DAR	HOM		73rd	306	
2005	JR Motorsports	88	Chevy	DAY	CAL	MXC	LVS	ATL	NSH	BRI	TEX	PHO	TAL	DAR	RCH	CLT	DOV	NSH	KEN	MLW	DAY	CHI	NHA	PPR	GTY	IRP	GLN	MCH	BRI	CAL	RCH	DOV	KAN	CLT	MEM	TEX	PHO	HOM; 20	148th	-	
2006	JR Motorsports	88	Chevy	DAY; 22	CAL; 30	MXC; 15	LVS; 27	ATL; 15	BRI; 31	TEX; 23	NSH; 33	PHO; 16	TAL; 7	RCH; 34	DAR; 18	CLT; 33	DOV; 30	NSH; 22	KEN; 26	MLW; 33	DAY	CHI	NHA; 11	MAR; 16	GTY; 25	IRP; 17	GLN	MCH	BRI	CAL	RCH	DOV	KAN	CLT	MEM	TEX	PHO	HOM	30th	1975	

==== Craftsman Truck Series ====
NASCAR Craftsman Truck Series results
Year	Team	No.	Make	1	2	3	4	5	6	7	8	9	10	11	12	13	14	15	16	17	18	19	20	21	22	23	24	25	NCTC	Pts	Ref
2003	Green Light Racing	07	Chevy	DAY	DAR	MMR	MAR	CLT	DOV	TEX	MEM	MLW	KAN	KEN	GTW	MCH	IRP	NSH	BRI	RCH; 12	NHA	CAL	LVS	SBO	TEX				67th	306	
2003	Dean Motorsports	55	Dodge																							MAR; 15	PHO	HOM; 34	67th	306	
2004	HT Motorsports	59	Dodge	DAY	ATL	MAR; 21	MFD; 6	CLT; 28	DOV; 35	TEX	MEM; 33	MLW	KAN	KEN	GTW	MCH	IRP; 29	NSH; 29	BRI	RCH; DNQ	NHA	LVS	CAL	TEX	MAR	PHO	DAR	HOM	36th	603	
2005	Ken Schrader Racing	52	Chevy	DAY	CAL	ATL	MAR	GTY	MFD	CLT	DOV	TEX	MCH	MLW	KAN	KEN	MEM	IRP	NSH	BRI	RCH	NHA	LVS	MAR	ATL; DNQ				82nd	73	
2005	Green Light Racing	07	Chevy																							TEX; 30	PHO	HOM	82nd	73	

==== Camping World East Series ====
NASCAR Camping World East Series results
Year	Team	No.	Make	1	2	3	4	5	6	7	8	9	10	11	12	13	NCWESC	Pts	Ref
2007	Pete Knight	81	Chevy	GRE	ELK	IOW	SBO	STA	NHA	TMP	NSH	ADI	LRP	MFD	NHA; 22	DOV	67th	102	
2008	Pete Knight	81	Chevy	GRE	IOW; 10	SBO	GLN	NHA	TMP	NSH	ADI	LRP	MFD	NHA	DOV	STA	60th	134	
