= 1984 Daytona 500 =

Auto race held at Daytona International Speedway in 1984

Race details
- Race 1 of 30 in the 1984 NASCAR Winston Cup Series season
- 1984 Daytona 500 program cover
- Date: February 19, 1984
- Location: Daytona International Speedway, Daytona Beach, Florida
- Course: Permanent racing facility 2.5 mi (4.02336 km)
- Distance: 200 laps, 500 mi (804.672 km)
- Weather: Temperatures of 79 °F (26 °C); wind speeds of 11.6 miles per hour (18.7 km/h)
- Average speed: 150.994 mph (243.001 km/h)

Pole position
Driver	Cale Yarborough	Ranier-Lundy
- Time: 44.588 seconds 201.848 mph (324.843 km/h)

Qualifying race winners
Duel 1 Winner	Cale Yarborough; 0:57:56; 129.459 mph (208.344 km/h)	Ranier-Lundy; Cautions: 3 for 18 laps Margin of victory: 1.8 seconds Lead changes: 5
Duel 2 Winner	Bobby Allison; 0:53:44; 139.578 mph (224.629 km/h)	DiGard Motorsports; Cautions: 2 for 12 laps Margin of victory: 2 car lengths Lead changes: 9

Most laps led
Driver	Cale Yarborough	Ranier-Lundy
- Laps: 89

Winner
No. 28	Cale Yarborough	Ranier-Lundy

Television in the United States
- Network: CBS
- Announcers: Host: Chris Economaki; Lap-by-lap: Ken Squier; Driver analyst: David Hobbs; Pit Reporter: Chris Economaki; Pit reporter: Mike Joy
- Nielsen ratings: 8.7/23 (12.3 million viewers)

The 1984 Daytona 500, the 26th running of the event, was held February 19, 1984, at Daytona International Speedway in Daytona Beach, Florida. Cale Yarborough, who won the pole, completed a lap of 201.848 miles per hour (324.843 km/h), officially breaking the 200 miles per hour (320 km/h) barrier at Daytona. He won the race for the second year in a row, and the fourth time in his career, with an identical last-lap pass as the previous year, this time passing Darrell Waltrip who would later go on to win the same race in 1989.

This race would be the first Daytona 500 starts for Ken Ragan, Greg Sacks, Mike Alexander, Connie Saylor, Doug Heveron, Bobby Hillin, Jr., Hendrick Motorsports And Trevor Boys. It was the only Daytona 500 start for Dean Combs. This race would be the final Daytona 500 starts for Dean Roper, Ronnie Thomas, and Tommy Gale.

== Speedweeks ==
Cale Yarborough and his crew chief Waddell Wilson were ready to repeat as Daytona 500 champion as Speedweeks got underway. Yarborough won the pole with a new track record. In the first Twin 125, 1980 Daytona 500 champ Buddy Baker was leading with 8 laps to go but did not want to be passed on the last lap. Baker slowed and forced Yarborough to pass. Yarborough took off and Baker could not catch him, winning by 1.8 seconds. In the second race, 1982 Daytona 500 champ Bobby Allison held off Harry Gant. A total of 72 cars participated in the Twin 125 mile qualifiers, with 36 in each race.

== Calamity Corner ==
In 1984 Daytona's 4th turn was dubbed Calamity Corner after three violent accidents. Ricky Rudd was battered and bruised in a wild, tumbling, sidewinding crash in the Busch Clash, but he won two weeks later in Richmond. In the second Twin 125, Randy LaJoie spun off turn four. His car began flying and went underside-first into the inside wall (which Rudd had luckily just missed) before flipping end over end to a hard stop. LaJoie suffered back injuries. The next day, in a consolation race for cars that failed to qualify for the big race, Natz Peters's car ricocheted off the inside wall into the path of another car, driven by Jim Hurlbert. Both cars exploded in flames. Neither driver was seriously injured.

Along with Waltrip's vicious crash at Daytona the previous year, by the time the Series returned to Daytona for the Firecracker 400 in July, the entire Turn 4 apron was paved over, the beginning of tracks paving aprons for cars to scrub off speed on asphalt aprons instead of grass, which did little to slow spinning cars. The backstretch apron was paved in 1995.

== Qualifying ==
=== Qualifying results ===
Pos	No.	Driver	Team	Manufacturer	Speed
1	28	Cale Yarborough W	Ranier-Lundy Racing	Chevrolet Monte Carlo	201.848 mph
2	44	Terry Labonte	Hagan Racing	Chevrolet Monte Carlo	200.325 mph
3	9	Bill Elliott	Melling Racing	Ford Thunderbird	Set through a combination of the UNO Twin 125 mile qualifying races, second round qualifying, and provisionals.
4	22	Bobby Allison W	DiGard Motorsports	Buick Regal	Set through a combination of the UNO Twin 125 mile qualifying races, second round qualifying, and provisionals.
5	21	Buddy Baker W	Wood Brothers Racing	Ford Thunderbird	Set through a combination of the UNO Twin 125 mile qualifying races, second round qualifying, and provisionals.
6	33	Harry Gant	Mach 1 Racing	Chevrolet Monte Carlo	Set through a combination of the UNO Twin 125 mile qualifying races, second round qualifying, and provisionals.
7	12	Neil Bonnett	Junior Johnson & Associates	Chevrolet Monte Carlo	Set through a combination of the UNO Twin 125 mile qualifying races, second round qualifying, and provisionals.
8	55	Benny Parsons W	Johnny Hayes Racing	Chevrolet Monte Carlo	Set through a combination of the UNO Twin 125 mile qualifying races, second round qualifying, and provisionals.
9	5	Geoff Bodine	All-Star Racing	Chevrolet Monte Carlo	Set through a combination of the UNO Twin 125 mile qualifying races, second round qualifying, and provisionals.
10	27	Tim Richmond	Blue Max Racing	Pontiac Grand Prix	Set through a combination of the UNO Twin 125 mile qualifying races, second round qualifying, and provisionals.
11	16	David Pearson W	Bobby Hawkins Racing	Chevrolet Monte Carlo	Set through a combination of the UNO Twin 125 mile qualifying races, second round qualifying, and provisionals.
12	90	Dick Brooks	Donlavey Racing	Ford Thunderbird	Set through a combination of the UNO Twin 125 mile qualifying races, second round qualifying, and provisionals.
13	66	Phil Parsons	Johnny Hayes Racing	Chevrolet Monte Carlo	Set through a combination of the UNO Twin 125 mile qualifying races, second round qualifying, and provisionals.
14	15	Ricky Rudd	Bud Moore Engineering	Ford Thunderbird	Set through a combination of the UNO Twin 125 mile qualifying races, second round qualifying, and provisionals.
15	7	Kyle Petty	Wood Brothers Racing	Ford Thunderbird	Set through a combination of the UNO Twin 125 mile qualifying races, second round qualifying, and provisionals.
16	1	Lake Speed	Ellington Racing	Chevrolet Monte Carlo	Set through a combination of the UNO Twin 125 mile qualifying races, second round qualifying, and provisionals.
17	77	Ken Ragan R	Branch-Ragan Racing	Chevrolet Monte Carlo	Set through a combination of the UNO Twin 125 mile qualifying races, second round qualifying, and provisionals.
18	47	Ron Bouchard	Race Hill Farm Team	Buick Regal	Set through a combination of the UNO Twin 125 mile qualifying races, second round qualifying, and provisionals.
19	89	Dean Roper	Mueller Brothers	Pontiac Grand Prix	Set through a combination of the UNO Twin 125 mile qualifying races, second round qualifying, and provisionals.
20	51	Greg Sacks R	Sacks & Sons	Chevrolet Monte Carlo	Set through a combination of the UNO Twin 125 mile qualifying races, second round qualifying, and provisionals.
21	42	Dick Trickle	Billy Matthews	Chevrolet Monte Carlo	Set through a combination of the UNO Twin 125 mile qualifying races, second round qualifying, and provisionals.
22	8	Bobby Hillin Jr. R	Stavola Brothers Racing	Chevrolet Monte Carlo	Set through a combination of the UNO Twin 125 mile qualifying races, second round qualifying, and provisionals.
23	01	Doug Heveron R	Heveron Racing	Chevrolet Monte Carlo	Set through a combination of the UNO Twin 125 mile qualifying races, second round qualifying, and provisionals.
24	4	Lennie Pond	Morgan-McClure Motorsports	Chevrolet Monte Carlo	Set through a combination of the UNO Twin 125 mile qualifying races, second round qualifying, and provisionals.
25	97	Dean Combs R	Irv Sanderson Racing	Oldsmobile Cutlass	Set through a combination of the UNO Twin 125 mile qualifying races, second round qualifying, and provisionals.
26	11	Darrell Waltrip	Junior Johnson & Associates	Chevrolet Monte Carlo	Set through a combination of the UNO Twin 125 mile qualifying races, second round qualifying, and provisionals.
27	88	Rusty Wallace	Cliff Stewart Racing	Pontiac Grand Prix	Set through a combination of the UNO Twin 125 mile qualifying races, second round qualifying, and provisionals.
28	67	Buddy Arrington	Arrington Racing	Chrysler Imperial	Set through a combination of the UNO Twin 125 mile qualifying races, second round qualifying, and provisionals.
29	3	Dale Earnhardt	Richard Childress Racing	Chevrolet Monte Carlo	Set through a combination of the UNO Twin 125 mile qualifying races, second round qualifying, and provisionals.
30	64	Tommy Gale	Langley Racing	Ford Thunderbird	Set through a combination of the UNO Twin 125 mile qualifying races, second round qualifying, and provisionals.
31	98	Joe Ruttman	Robert McEntyre	Chevrolet Monte Carlo	Set through a combination of the UNO Twin 125 mile qualifying races, second round qualifying, and provisionals.
32	14	A. J. Foyt W	A. J. Foyt	Oldsmobile Cutlass	Set through a combination of the UNO Twin 125 mile qualifying races, second round qualifying, and provisionals.
33	84	Jody Ridley	Benfield Racing	Chevrolet Monte Carlo	Set through a combination of the UNO Twin 125 mile qualifying races, second round qualifying, and provisionals.
34	43	Richard Petty W	Curb Racing	Pontiac Grand Prix	Set through a combination of the UNO Twin 125 mile qualifying races, second round qualifying, and provisionals.
35	48	Trevor Boys R	Hylton Racing	Chevrolet Monte Carlo	Set through a combination of the UNO Twin 125 mile qualifying races, second round qualifying, and provisionals.
36	29	Connie Saylor	Herb Adcox	Chevrolet Monte Carlo	Set through a combination of the UNO Twin 125 mile qualifying races, second round qualifying, and provisionals.
37	17	Clark Dwyer	Hamby Motorsports	Chevrolet Monte Carlo	Set through a combination of the UNO Twin 125 mile qualifying races, second round qualifying, and provisionals.
38	41	Ronnie Thomas	Thomas Racing	Chevrolet Monte Carlo	Set through a combination of the UNO Twin 125 mile qualifying races, second round qualifying, and provisionals.
39	75	Dave Marcis	RahMoc Enterprises	Pontiac Grand Prix	Set through a combination of the UNO Twin 125 mile qualifying races, second round qualifying, and provisionals.
40	10	Sterling Marlin	Hamby Motorsports	Chevrolet Monte Carlo	Set through a combination of the UNO Twin 125 mile qualifying races, second round qualifying, and provisionals.
41	52	Jimmy Means	Means Racing	Chevrolet Monte Carlo	Set through a combination of the UNO Twin 125 mile qualifying races, second round qualifying, and provisionals.
42	71	Mike Alexander R	Marcis Auto Racing	Oldsmobile Cutlass	Set through a combination of the UNO Twin 125 mile qualifying races, second round qualifying, and provisionals.

== Failed to qualify ==
Car #	Driver	Car Make
0	Delma Cowart	Chevrolet Monte Carlo
2	Tom Sneva	Buick Regal
06	Wayne Peterson	Buick Regal
6	Jim Sauter	Chevrolet Monte Carlo
07	Randy LaJoie	Chevrolet Monte Carlo
18	Joe Booher	Chevrolet Monte Carlo
20	Rick Newsom	Chevrolet Monte Carlo
23	Elliott Forbes-Robinson	Oldsmobile Cutlass
25	Jerry Churchill	Chevrolet Monte Carlo
31	Ronnie Sanders	Chevrolet Monte Carlo
34	Jim Hurlbert	Buick Regal
37	Connie Saylor	Pontiac Grand Prix
38	Ramo Stott	Buick Regal
39	Blackie Wangerin	Ford Thunderbird
50	Jim Southard	Chevrolet Monte Carlo
53	Donny Paul	Chevrolet Monte Carlo
54	David Simko	Buick Regal
58	Jerry Bowman	Ford Thunderbird
60	Natz Peters	Buick Regal
63	Jocko Maggiacomo	Oldsmobile Cutlass
65	Ralph Jones	Ford Thunderbird
68	Laurent Rioux	Chevrolet Monte Carlo
70	J. D. McDuffie	Pontiac Grand Prix
73	Steve Moore	Chevrolet Monte Carlo
74	Bobby Wawak	Chevrolet Monte Carlo
76	Lowell Cowell	Oldsmobile Cutlass
82	Mark Stahl	Ford Thunderbird
87	Randy Baker	Buick Regal
92	Jack Ingram	Chevrolet Monte Carlo
99	Philip Duffie	Buick Regal
29	Grant Adcox (Driver change)	Chevrolet Monte Carlo

R = Daytona 500 rookie
W = Former Daytona 500 winner

== Race Summary ==
President Ronald Reagan gave the command "Gentlemen, start your engines!" by phone from the White House. Yarborough, Allison, Dale Earnhardt and Richard Petty took turns leading the early laps of the race, but Petty and Allison fell out early with mechanical problems. Yarborough clearly had the strongest car, leading 51 of the first 100 laps. Yarborough's car was so fast, he twice passed leading cars on the outside of the third turn.

Yarborough led most of the second half of the race, but Earnhardt and Terry Labonte were also strong, as well as Bill Elliott and Darrell Waltrip, who lead for the first time on lap 142. Waltrip took the lead again on lap 162 during green flag pit stops. The race's final caution came at lap 177, but four leaders, Waltrip, Yarborough, Labonte and Earnhardt-decided to remain on the track and hold their positions.

After the race resumed on lap 183, six cars pulled away from the field. And as the final lap started, it was Waltrip, Yarborough, Earnhardt, Neil Bonnett, Harry Gant, and Bill Elliott. For 38 laps, Waltrip hung onto the lead. But he knew how fast Yarborough was. Yarborough made his move on the backstretch-the same move that had failed spectacularly in 1979 against Donnie Allison but worked perfectly in 1983 against Baker. Waltrip moved to the middle of the track but did not aggressively block. Yarborough made the pass without drafting help and immediately extended his lead to about 6 car-lengths.

Dale Earnhardt also moved on Waltrip but didn't begin his pass until turn four. He barely nipped Waltrip at the line, while Bonnett held off Elliott for fourth. Yarborough won by eight car lengths. And for the first time since Fireball Roberts in 1962, a single driver had led the most laps, won the pole, his qualifying race, and the 500. This made Yarborough become the only driver to win the Daytona 500 from the pole more than once until Elliott joined him after winning the following year and in 1987.

== Race results ==
=== Box Score ===
Pos	Grid	No.	Driver	Manufacturer	Laps	Status	Laps led	Points
1	1	28	Cale Yarborough W	Chevrolet Monte Carlo	200	3:18:41	89	185 (10)
2	29	3	Dale Earnhardt	Chevrolet Monte Carlo	200	-8 car lengths	19	175 (5)
3	26	11	Darrell Waltrip	Chevrolet Monte Carlo	200	Running	39	170 (5)
4	7	12	Neil Bonnett	Chevrolet Monte Carlo	200	Running	1	165 (5)
5	3	9	Bill Elliott	Ford Thunderbird	200	Running	1	160 (5)
6	6	33	Harry Gant	Chevrolet Monte Carlo	200	Running	1	155 (5)
7	14	15	Ricky Rudd	Ford Thunderbird	199	-1 lap	0	146
8	9	5	Geoffrey Bodine	Chevrolet Monte Carlo	199	-1 lap	0	142
9	11	16	David Pearson W	Chevrolet Monte Carlo	198	-2 laps	0	138
10	33	84	Jody Ridley	Chevrolet Monte Carlo	198	-2 laps	0	134
11	13	66	Phil Parsons	Chevrolet Monte Carlo	198	-2 laps	0	130
12	2	44	Terry Labonte	Chevrolet Monte Carlo	198	-2 laps	9	132 (5)
13	24	4	Lennie Pond	Chevrolet Monte Carlo	197	-3 laps	0	124
14	17	77	Ken Ragan R	Chevrolet Monte Carlo	197	-3 laps	0	121
15	40	10	Sterling Marlin	Chevrolet Monte Carlo	197	-3 laps	0	118
16	19	89	Dean Roper	Pontiac Grand Prix	196	-4 laps	0	115
17	41	52	Jimmy Means	Chevrolet Monte Carlo	196	-4 laps	0	112
18	20	51	Greg Sacks R	Chevrolet Monte Carlo	195	-5 laps	0	109
19	25	97	Dean Combs R	Oldsmobile Cutlass	194	-6 laps	0	106
20	37	17	Clark Dwyer	Chevrolet Monte Carlo	191	-9 laps	0	103
21	42	71	Mike Alexander R	Oldsmobile Cutlass	187	Engine	0	100
22	36	29	Connie Saylor R	Chevrolet Monte Carlo	186	Overheating	0	97
23	23	01	Doug Heveron R	Chevrolet Monte Carlo	173	Ignition	0	94
24	38	41	Ronnie Thomas	Chevrolet Monte Carlo	173	Rear end	0	91
25	28	67	Buddy Arrington	Chrysler Imperial	170	Connecting rod	0	88
26	12	90	Dick Brooks	Ford Thunderbird	158	Crash	0	85
27	18	47	Ron Bouchard	Buick Regal	158	Crash	0	82
28	31	98	Joe Ruttman	Chevrolet Monte Carlo	146	Crash	0	79
29	8	55	Benny Parsons W	Chevrolet Monte Carlo	108	Cylinder head	0	76
30	27	88	Rusty Wallace	Pontiac Grand Prix	95	Crash	0	73
31	34	43	Richard Petty W	Pontiac Grand Prix	92	Camshaft	24	75 (5)
32	30	64	Tommy Gale	Ford Thunderbird	69	Engine	0	67
33	10	27	Tim Richmond	Pontiac Grand Prix	66	Engine	0	64
34	4	22	Bobby Allison W	Buick Regal	61	Camshaft	17	66 (5)
35	22	8	Bobby Hillin Jr. R	Chevrolet Monte Carlo	60	Engine	0	58
36	21	42	Dick Trickle	Chevrolet Monte Carlo	53	Ignition	0	55
37	16	1	Lake Speed	Chevrolet Monte Carlo	46	Push rod	0	52
38	5	21	Buddy Baker W	Ford Thunderbird	30	Vibration	0	49
39	32	14	A. J. Foyt W	Oldsmobile Cutlass	24	Suspension	0	46
40	15	7	Kyle Petty	Ford Thunderbird	21	Engine	0	43
41	35	48	Trevor Boys R	Chevrolet Monte Carlo	17	Engine	0	40
42	39	75	Dave Marcis	Pontiac Grand Prix	3	Engine	0	37

(5) Indicates 5 bonus points added to normal race points scored for leading 1 lap
(10) Indicates 10 bonus points added to normal race points scored for leading 1 lap & leading the most laps

=== Cautions ===
7 for 39 laps

From lap	To lap	# of laps	Reason
5	9	5	Car #75 spun turn 2
64	67	4	Car #8 engine
73	78	6	Car #64 engine
99	104	6	Car #88 accident turn 2
150	153	4	Car #98 accident turn 4
160	167	8	Car #'s 47,90 accident turn 4
177	182	6	Car #67 engine

=== Lap leader breakdown ===
Leader	From lap	To lap	# Of laps
Cale Yarborough W	1	14	14
Bobby Allison W	15	15	1
Cale Yarborough W	16	17	2
Bobby Allison W	18	18	1
Cale Yarborough W	19	19	1
Bobby Allison W	20	20	1
Cale Yarborough W	21	21	1
Bobby Allison W	22	25	4
Cale Yarborough W	26	28	3
Bobby Allison W	29	32	4
Cale Yarborough W	33	37	5
Dale Earnhardt	38	38	1
Richard Petty W	39	40	2
Dale Earnhardt	41	43	3
Bobby Allison W	44	49	6
Richard Petty W	50	64	15
Dale Earnhardt	65	67	3
Richard Petty W	68	68	1
Cale Yarborough W	69	86	18
Richard Petty W	87	92	6
Cale Yarborough W	93	99	7
Dale Earnhardt	100	104	5
Neil Bonnett	105	105	1
Terry Labonte	106	112	7
Dale Earnhardt	113	116	4
Cale Yarborough W	117	135	19
Dale Earnhardt	136	136	1
Terry Labonte	137	138	2
Harry Gant	139	139	1
Dale Earnhardt	140	141	2
Darrell Waltrip	142	142	1
Cale Yarborough W	143	160	18
Bill Elliott	161	161	1
Darrell Waltrip	162	199	38
Cale Yarborough W	200	200	1

R = Daytona 500 rookie
W = Former Daytona 500 winner

Preceded by 1983 Winston Western 500	NASCAR Winston Cup Series Season; 1983-84	Succeeded by 1984 Miller High Life 400
