= Sacks & Sons =

Former NASCAR team

- Owner(s): Arnie Sacks
- Series: Winston Cup Series
- Race drivers: Greg Sacks, Cecil Gordon
- Manufacturer: Chevrolet
- Opened: 1983
- Closed: 1985

Career
- Races competed: 38

Sacks & Sons was a short lived NASCAR Winston Cup race team from 1983–85. The team ran 38 races, all but one run by Greg Sacks, son of owner Arnie Sacks. Cecil Gordon also ran one race for the team. The team had 0 wins, 0 top 5s, three top 10s, 12 top 20s, 0 poles, and 18 DNF'S. The average start was 24.71 and the average finish was 24.2. They led 2 laps out of a possible 7,999. They ran 64.3% of the total laps they could possibly run.
