= X-1R =

X-1R logo

X-1R is a patented performance lubricant originally developed for the NASA Space Shuttle Program. It acts as a friction reduction modifier within extreme pressure environments. X-1R is a Certified Space Technology and is an inductee in the NASA Space Technology Hall of Fame.
