= Greg Sacks =

American racing driver (born 1952)

- Born: November 3, 1952 (age 74); Mattituck, New York, U.S.
- Achievements: Martinsville Speedway track record holder in modified division

NASCAR Cup Series career
- 263 races run over 18 years
- Best finish: 19th (1984)
- First race: 1983 Firecracker 400 (Daytona)
- Last race: 2005 Pennsylvania 500 (Pocono)
- First win: 1985 Firecracker 400 (Daytona)
Wins	Top tens	Poles
1	20	2

NASCAR O'Reilly Auto Parts Series career
- 33 races run over 8 years
- Best finish: 34th (1997)
- First race: 1989 Goodwrench 200 (Rockingham)
- Last race: 2010 Subway Jalapeño 250 (Daytona)
- First win: 1996 Humminbird Fishfinder 500K (Talladega)
Wins	Top tens	Poles
1	5	2

NASCAR FedEx Freight Truck Series career
- 1 race run over 1 year
- Best finish: 106th (2004)
- First race: 2004 O'Reilly 400K (Texas)
Wins	Top tens	Poles
0	0	0
- Statistics up to date as of December 8, 2012.

Gregory Sacks (born November 3, 1952) is an American former stock car racing driver. He has previously competed in the NASCAR Nextel Cup Series, the NASCAR Busch Series, the NASCAR Craftsman Truck Series, and the ARCA Re/Max Series.

Sacks has spent most of his career as a research and development (R&D) driver for many NASCAR teams. He won the 1985 Firecracker 400 at Daytona International Speedway acting as an R&D driver for DiGard Motorsports.

== Modifieds ==
Early in his racing career, Sacks was a successful driver in what is now the NASCAR Whelen Modified Tour. Competing from 1980 to 1983, he won seventeen races at Stafford Motor Speedway. 1982 was an especially good year for him, as he won the track championship that year, as well as the Spring Sizzler, The Labor Day 200 and the Fall Final. Sacks also won the Dogwood Classic at Martinsville Speedway, the Bud Classic at Oswego Speedway, the Thompson 300 at Thompson International Speedway, the World Series of Asphalt at Thompson Speedway and the Race of Champions at Pocono Raceway.

In 1983, Sacks made his NASCAR Winston Cup Series debut in the Pepsi 400 at Daytona in the No. 5 car owned and sponsored by his father, Arnie. He only completed nineteen laps until experiencing engine failure, finishing 38th out of forty cars. Sacks competed in four more events that season, posting a best finish of seventeenth in the Champion Spark Plug 400 at Michigan International Speedway, the only race he finished that year.

== Success in the 1980s ==
In 1984, Sacks made a full attempt at the NASCAR Winston Cup Series, once again in a car owned by his father, only now it ran as No. 51. Sacks made 29 out of the thirty races, finished 19th in points and runner-up to Rusty Wallace for the NASCAR Rookie of the Year award. 1985 got off to a rough start for Sacks. After the first four races, his father's team folded.

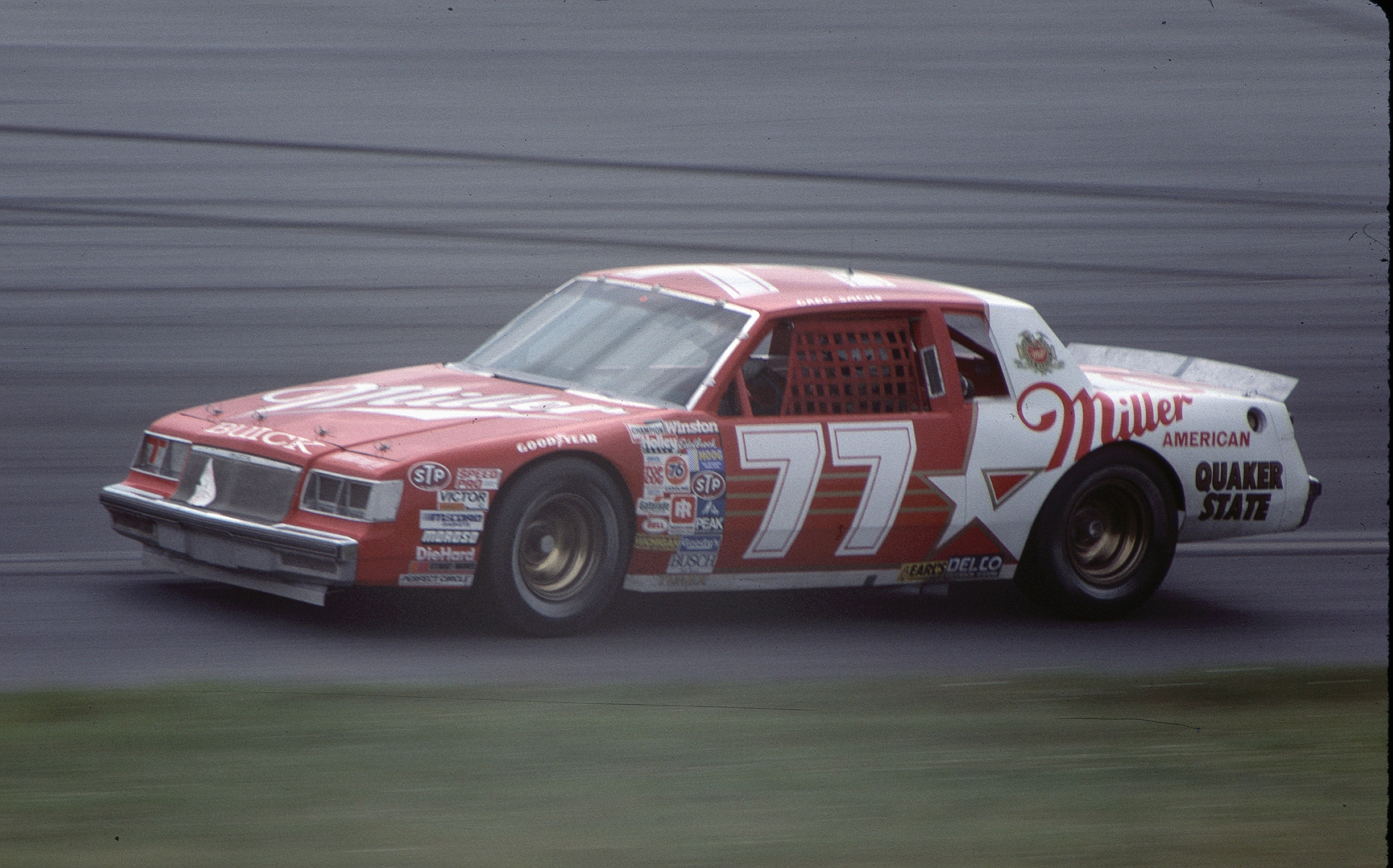
Sacks driving for DiGard in 1985

Seven races later, Sacks was able to drive the No. 49 car owned by 1966 NASCAR Rookie of the Year James Hylton. Before the Firecracker 400, DiGard Motorsports asked Sacks to drive their R&D car. Sacks qualified ninth and defeated pole-sitter Bill Elliott to earn his only NASCAR Winston Cup Series victory. The win was considered to be one of NASCAR's biggest upsets, as Sacks's car was only scheduled to run a set number of laps before going behind the wall to make changes, but his car kept competing for the win, therefore DiGard decided to let Sacks race as normal. After DiGard's regular driver Bobby Allison quit the team days after the race, the team let Sacks finish the season in their regular car. The next year, Sacks found himself running a limited schedule as DiGard slowly went bankrupt.

In 1987, Sacks signed on to drive the No. 50 Pontiac for the Dingman Brothers, where he struggled with qualifying for each race. Three-quarters of the way through 1988, Sacks left the team to drive for Buddy Baker's team, the No. 88 Oldsmobile. He came close to a victory at Bristol in 1989, where he led 119 laps only to lose the lead to Rusty Wallace with forty laps to go. Although he posted two top-ten finishes in the first ten races of the 1989 season, Sacks was replaced by rookie Jimmy Spencer. Sacks was unemployed for a brief period, then joined on with Tom Winkle's No. 48 Pontiac for most of the season, joining with Hendrick Motorsports for the Autoworks 500 at Phoenix International Raceway as part of the driving team gathering in-race footage for the "Days of Thunder" movie.

== 1990–1997 ==
Sacks started off 1990 in a familiar situation with no ride, driving part-time for Hendrick's development team. He participated in the Busch Clash at Daytona and at Darlington in the TranSouth 500, driving the No. 46 'City Chevrolet' Lumina "Days of Thunder" movie car. Four races later, Sacks was rewarded with a part-time ride at Hendrick, driving the No. 18 Ultra Slim-Fast Chevrolet, finishing second at Talladega Superspeedway in the Winston 500. After Darrell Waltrip was injured in a practice crash at Daytona, Sacks drove the No. 17 car for three races—the Champion Spark Plug 400, Busch 500, and the Heinz Southern 500, with a best finish of second at Michigan during this three-race stretch. The highlight of his season was winning the pole position at the Pepsi Firecracker 400. Following a crash in practice by teammate Waltrip, NASCAR officials noted that several teams had made modifications, and NASCAR made the teams spot-weld the blocks back into place, causing a loss of power. Trying to make up for lost speed, Sacks caused a 23-car pileup at the end of the first lap, taking out eight cars, including Sacks. No one was seriously hurt in that race, but it gave Sacks a reputation of being an excellent qualifier, as shown in 1989, when he won the pole in just his second Busch Series race. Sacks was signed to a three-year deal to drive the No. 18 for Hendrick and Paul Newman, with backing from Ultra Slim-Fast, but following the season Ultra Slim-Fast pulled out, the team was folded, and Sacks was released.

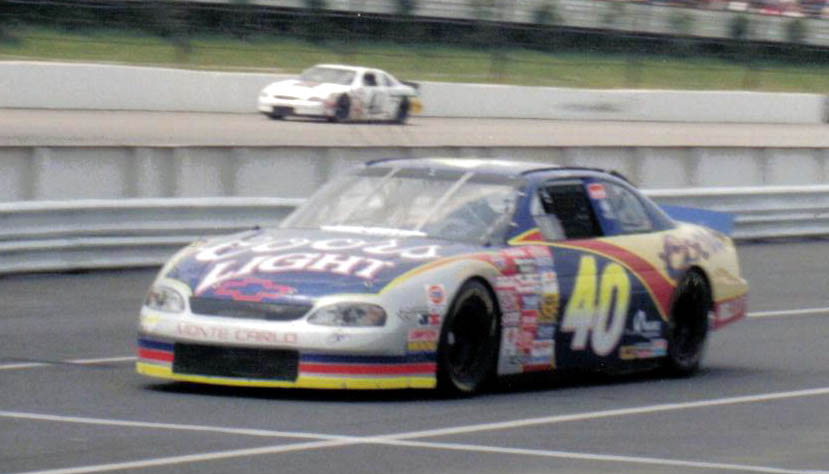
Sacks in the No. 40 in 1997

Sacks started off 1991 at the Daytona 500 driving his own No. 18 car, but crashed early in the race. He ran ten more races that year in the No. 47 Oldsmobile for Derick Close, posting two top-twenty finishes. He started 1992 with Larry Hedrick Motorsports, but suffered injuries in a lap five crash at the Champion Spark Plug 400, and only drove one race for the rest of the season. He moved on to Tri-Star Motorsports in 1993, and finished sixth at the DieHard 500. In 1994, Sacks set the track record at Atlanta when he won the pole. Nineteen-ninety four also marked the second time in his Cup career that he completed the full schedule, piloting the No. 77 Ford owned by D.K. Ulrich. Sacks raced part-time in the Cup and Busch series over the next two years, winning a Busch Series event in a one-race deal for Diamond Ridge Motorsports at Talladega Superspeedway in 1996. The next year, he started out driving the No. 20 Ford for championship owner Harry Ranier, but was soon released as sponsorship funding ended; following his release, he sued the team, claiming breach of contract. Later in the season, he filled in for rookie driver Robby Gordon, who had suffered burns in the Indianapolis 500. After Gordon was released later in the year, Sacks finished the season for the team.

== Struggles ==
In 1998, it looked like Sacks had finally found a steady ride, driving the No. 98 Ford for Cale Yarborough. However, on lap 136 of the Texas 500 at Texas Motor Speedway, Sacks lost control of his car and wrecked, suffering life-threatening injuries. He missed the rest of the season.

Sacks made his return in 1999 in the Busch Series, but only qualified for one of the several races he attempted. Sacks tried his hand at Winston Cup again in 2000, attempting that year's Daytona 500 in the No. 96 Chevrolet. He did not make the field. After making sporadic races in modifieds, Sacks announced his return to the Winston Cup Series and Busch Series in the summer of 2002, driving the No. 05 Chevy. Sacks teamed with Loren Fossie to form "Team Franchisit/Sacks Racing". Originally set to debut at the Brickyard 400, the date was pushed to the fall race at Charlotte Motor Speedway. Nothing was ever heard from the team since, and it is not clear if the team was originally planned as a marketing tool for Franchisit.

In 2004, Sacks formed Daytona Speed Inc., with Ed Raabe and James Wilsberg. Making its first attempt at Chicagoland Speedway, the team did not make a race until the Pennsylvania 500 the next month. In February 2005, Raabe departed to form his own race team (Chevrolet), leaving all of the (Dodge) Daytona Speed equipment in the care of Sacks. Sacks ran both Pocono races in 2005, and finished 43rd in both of them.

The team attempted a part-time schedule in 2006, but failed to make the field for any race. In early 2007, an arbitrator forced his sponsor Who's Your Daddy? to pay over a million dollars to Sacks after a contract violation.

== 2008–present ==
=== 2008 ===
Sacks was to attempt a partial schedule in the ARCA/ReMAX series in 2008. He tried to qualify for the ARCA race at Daytona but missed the field after posting the 48th best qualifying time.

=== 2010 ===
Sacks drove the No. 88 car owned by Dale Earnhardt Jr. in the Nationwide Series Subway Jalapeño 250 on July 2 at Daytona. Sacks finished 21st after qualifying seventh.

Sacks and his family, who own Grand Touring Vodka, sponsored JR Motorsports for the 2011 Nationwide Series season.

== Personal life ==
Sacks is married and has three children. He lives in Ormond Beach, Florida. He and his sons are partners in Grand Touring Vodka.

== Motorsports career results ==
=== NASCAR ===
(key) (Bold – pole position awarded by qualifying time. Italics – pole position earned by points standings or practice time. * – most laps led.)

==== Nextel Cup Series ====
NASCAR Nextel Cup Series results
Year	Team	No.	Make	1	2	3	4	5	6	7	8	9	10	11	12	13	14	15	16	17	18	19	20	21	22	23	24	25	26	27	28	29	30	31	32	33	34	35	36	NNCC	Pts	Ref
1983	Sacks & Sons	5	Chevy	DAY	RCH	CAR	ATL	DAR	NWS	MAR	TAL	NSV	DOV	BRI	CLT	RSD	POC	MCH	DAY; 38	NSV	POC; 29	TAL	MCH; 17	BRI	DAR	RCH	DOV	MAR	NWS	CLT; 30	CAR	ATL; 38	RSD							47th	359	
1984	Sacks & Sons	51	Chevy	DAY; 18	RCH; 24	CAR; 34	ATL; 16	BRI	NWS; 18	DAR; 21	MAR; 17	TAL; 14	NSV; 29	DOV; 24	CLT; 38	RSD; 32	POC; 22	MCH; 32	DAY; 39	NSV; 29	POC; 24	TAL; 29	MCH; 22	BRI; 9	DAR; 37	RCH; 21	DOV; 25	MAR; 30	CLT; 18	NWS; 24	CAR; 35	ATL; 31	RSD; 16							19th	2545	
1985	Sacks & Sons	51	Chevy	DAY; 6	RCH	CAR; 13	ATL; 10	BRI	DAR	NWS	MAR	TAL; Wth	DOV																											25th	1944	
1985	Hylton Motorsports	49	Chevy											CLT; 35	RSD; 36	POC; 16	MCH																							25th	1944	
1985	DiGard Motorsports	10	Chevy															DAY; 1																						25th	1944	
1985	DiGard Motorsports	77	Buick																POC; 34	TAL; 15	MCH; 33	BRI; 28	DAR; 35	RCH; 20	DOV; 29	MAR; 14	NWS; 16	CLT; 11	CAR; 10	ATL; 9	RSD; 21									25th	1944	
1986	DiGard Motorsports	10	Pontiac	DAY; 35	RCH; 19	CAR; 37						TAL; 10	DOV																											41st	579	
1986	DiGard Motorsports	10	Chevy				ATL; 25	BRI	DAR	NWS	MAR			CLT; 39	RSD	POC	MCH	DAY; 39	POC	TAL	GLN	MCH; 38	BRI	DAR	RCH	DOV	MAR	NWS	CLT	CAR	ATL	RSD								41st	579	
1987	Dingman Brothers Racing	50	Pontiac	DAY; 20	CAR; 30	RCH	ATL; 37	DAR; 26	NWS	BRI	MAR	TAL; 26	CLT; 36	DOV	POC; 36	RSD	MCH; 29	DAY; 25	POC; 35	TAL	GLN	MCH; 19	BRI	DAR; 38	RCH	DOV	MAR; 24	NWS	CLT; 42	CAR; 27	RSD	ATL; 26								33rd	1200	
1988	Dingman Brothers Racing	50	Pontiac	DAY; 40	RCH	CAR	ATL; DNQ	DAR; 31	BRI	NWS	MAR	TAL; 17	CLT; 10	DOV	RSD	POC	MCH	DAY; 10	POC; 34	TAL; 38	GLN	MCH; 42	BRI	DAR																37th	1237	
1988	Baker-Schiff Racing	88	Olds																						RCH; 13	DOV	MAR; 12	CLT; 29	NWS; 10	CAR; 12	PHO; 38	ATL; 28								37th	1237	
1989	Baker-Schiff Racing	88	Olds	DAY; 23	CAR; 9	ATL; 26	RCH; 34	DAR; 25	BRI; 7*	NWS; 21	MAR; 28	TAL; 37	CLT; 30	DOV	SON	POC																								32nd	1565	
1989	Winkle Motorsports	48	Pontiac														MCH; 39	DAY	POC; 30	TAL	GLN	MCH; 35	BRI; 30	DAR; 38	RCH; DNQ	DOV	MAR; 19	CLT; 35	NWS	CAR; 18		ATL; 29								32nd	1565	
1989	Hendrick Motorsports	46	Chevy																												PHO; 38									32nd	1565	
1990	Hendrick Motorsports	46	Chevy	DAY	RCH	CAR	ATL; DNQ	DAR; 37	BRI	NWS	MAR																													32nd	1663	
1990	Hendrick Motorsports	18	Chevy									TAL; 2	CLT; 14	DOV	SON	POC; 7	MCH; 26	**DAY**; 37	POC; 33	TAL; 18	GLN; 40				RCH; 23	DOV; 21	MAR	NWS	CLT	CAR	PHO; 12	ATL; 10								32nd	1663	
1990	Hendrick Motorsports	17	Chevy																			MCH; 2	BRI; 20	DAR; 30																32nd	1663	
1991	Daytona Speed Inc.	18	Chevy	DAY; 42	RCH	CAR	ATL	DAR	BRI	NWS	MAR																													39th	791	
1991	Close Racing	47	Olds									TAL; 39	CLT; 39	DOV	SON	POC	MCH; DNQ	DAY; 39	POC; 17	TAL; 19	GLN	MCH	BRI	DAR; 21	RCH; 32	DOV; DNQ	MAR; DNQ	NWS	CLT; 31	CAR; 29	PHO	ATL; 26								39th	791	
1992	Larry Hedrick Motorsports	41	Chevy	DAY; 14	CAR; 34	RCH; 32	ATL; 31	DAR; 28	BRI; 13	NWS; 21	MAR; 12	TAL; 35	CLT; 16	DOV; 19	SON; 43	POC; 11	MCH; 14	DAY; 26	POC; 29	TAL; 19	GLN; 31	MCH; 41	BRI	DAR	RCH	DOV	MAR	NWS	CLT	CAR; 33	PHO	ATL								30th	1759	
1993	Melling Racing	9	Ford	DAY	CAR	RCH	ATL; 23	DAR	BRI	NWS	MAR																													35th	1730	
1993	TriStar Motorsports	68	Ford									TAL; 33	SON	CLT; 17	DOV; 38	POC; 18	MCH; 22	DAY; 15	NHA; 32	POC; 32	TAL; 6	GLN	MCH; 12	BRI; 19	DAR; 25	RCH; 31	DOV; 20	MAR; 28	NWS; DNQ	CLT; 32	CAR; 32	PHO	ATL; 24							35th	1730	
1994	U.S. Motorsports Inc.	77	Ford	DAY; 6	CAR; 28	RCH; 28	ATL; 7	DAR; 30	BRI; 11	NWS; 34	MAR; 29	TAL; 6	SON; 24	CLT; 27	DOV; 24	POC; 24	MCH; 33	DAY; 37	NHA; 25	POC; 36	TAL; 29	IND; 18	GLN; 39	MCH; 32	BRI; 27	DAR; 19	RCH; 27	DOV; 38	MAR; 26	NWS; 35	CLT; 35	CAR; 39	PHO; 26	**ATL**; 39						31st	2593	
1995	Dick Brooks Racing	40	Pontiac	DAY; DNQ	CAR; 41	RCH; 19	ATL; 29	DAR; 22	BRI; 36	NWS; 35	MAR; 22	TAL; 35	SON; DNQ	CLT; DNQ	DOV; 28	POC; 33	MCH; DNQ																							39th	1349	
1995	Junior Johnson & Associates	27	Ford															DAY; 17	NHA	POC	TAL																			39th	1349	
1995	Active Motorsports	32	Chevy																			IND; 33	GLN	MCH; 40					MAR; DNQ	NWS; DNQ	CLT; 33	CAR; 37	PHO; 43	ATL; 34						39th	1349	
1995	A.G. Dillard Motorsports	31	Chevy																						BRI; 25	DAR; 38	RCH; 37	DOV; DNQ												39th	1349	
1996	Leo Jackson Motorsports	33	Chevy	DAY	CAR	RCH	ATL	DAR	BRI	NWS	MAR	TAL	SON	CLT; QL^{†}	DOV; 27	POC	MCH																							42nd	710	
1996	Diamond Ridge Motorsports	29	Chevy															DAY; 39	NHA; 30	POC; 29	TAL; 25	IND; 32	GLN	MCH; 30	BRI	DAR	RCH	DOV	MAR	NWS										42nd	710	
1996	Team SABCO	40	Chevy																												CLT; 24	CAR	PHO							42nd	710	
1996	Team SABCO	40	Pontiac																															ATL; 18						42nd	710	
1997	Ranier-Walsh Racing	20	Ford	DAY; 37	CAR; 39	RCH; DNQ	ATL; 27	DAR; 29	TEX; 40	BRI; DNQ	MAR	SON	TAL; 25	CLT	DOV																									45th	778	
1997	Team SABCO	40	Chevy													POC; 42	MCH; DNQ	CAL; 27	DAY	NHA												TAL; 39	CAR; 39	PHO; 21	ATL; DNQ					45th	778	
1997	LJ Racing	91	Chevy																		POC; DNQ	IND; 31	GLN	MCH	BRI	DAR; DNQ	RCH	NHA	DOV	MAR										45th	778	
1997	Bud Moore Engineering	15	Ford																												CLT; DNQ									45th	778	
1998	Yarborough-Burdette Motorsports	98	Ford	DAY; 39	CAR; 36	LVS; 25	ATL; 31	DAR; 42	BRI; 36	TEX; 38	MAR	TAL	CAL	CLT	DOV	RCH	MCH	POC	SON	NHA	POC	IND	GLN	MCH	BRI	NHA	DAR	RCH	DOV	MAR	CLT	TAL	DAY	PHO	CAR	ATL				53rd	400	
2000	Petty-Huggins Motorsports	96	Chevy	DAY; DNQ	CAR	LVS	ATL	DAR	BRI	TEX	MAR	TAL	CAL	RCH	CLT	DOV	MCH	POC	SON	DAY	NHA	POC	IND	GLN	MCH	BRI	DAR	RCH	NHA	DOV	MAR	CLT	TAL	CAR	PHO	HOM	ATL			NA	-	
2004	Sacks Motorsports	13	Dodge	DAY	CAR	LVS	ATL	DAR	BRI	TEX	MAR	TAL	CAL	RCH	CLT	DOV	POC	MCH	SON	DAY	CHI; DNQ	NHA	POC; 42	IND; DNQ	GLN	MCH	BRI	CAL	RCH; DNQ	NHA; DNQ	DOV; DNQ	TAL	KAN	CLT; 41	MAR; DNQ	ATL; DNQ	PHO	DAR	HOM; 42	71st	114	
2005	Sacks Motorsports	13	Dodge	DAY; DNQ	CAL	LVS	ATL	BRI	MAR	TEX	PHO	TAL	DAR	RCH	CLT; DNQ	DOV	POC; 43	MCH	SON	DAY	CHI	NHA	POC; 43	IND	GLN	MCH	BRI	CAL	RCH	NHA	DOV	TAL	KAN; DNQ	CLT	MAR	ATL	TEX	PHO	HOM	79th	68	
2006	Sacks Motorsports	13	Ford	DAY	CAL	LVS	ATL; DNQ	BRI	MAR	TEX	PHO	TAL	RCH	DAR	CLT	DOV																								NA	-	
2006	Front Row Motorsports	34	Chevy														POC; DNQ	MCH	SON	DAY	CHI	NHA	POC; DNQ	IND	GLN	MCH	BRI	CAL	RCH	NHA	DOV	KAN	TAL	CLT	MAR	ATL	TEX	PHO	HOM	NA	-	
^{†} - Qualified for Robert Pressley

===== Daytona 500 =====
Year	Team	Manufacturer	Start	Finish
1984	Sacks & Sons	Chevrolet	20	18
1985	Sacks & Sons	Chevrolet	13	6
1986	DiGard Motorsports	Pontiac	26	35
1987	Dingman Brothers Racing	Pontiac	42	20
1988	Dingman Brothers Racing	Pontiac	7	40
1989	Baker-Schiff Racing	Oldsmobile	37	23
1991	Daytona Speed Inc.	Chevrolet	25	42
1992	Larry Hedrick Motorsports	Chevrolet	9	14
1994	U.S. Motorsports Inc.	Ford	31	6
1995	Dick Brooks Racing	Pontiac	DNQ	
1997	Ranier-Walsh Racing	Ford	34	37
1998	Yarborough-Burdette Motorsports	Ford	24	39
2000	Petty-Huggins Motorsports	Chevrolet	DNQ	
2005	Sacks Motorsports	Dodge	DNQ	

==== Nationwide Series ====
NASCAR Nationwide Series results
Year	Team	No.	Make	1	2	3	4	5	6	7	8	9	10	11	12	13	14	15	16	17	18	19	20	21	22	23	24	25	26	27	28	29	30	31	32	33	34	35	NNSC	Pts	Ref
1987	Falk Racing	04	Pontiac	DAY	HCY	MAR	DAR	BRI	LGY	SBO	CLT	DOV	IRP	ROU	JFC	OXF	SBO	HCY	RAL	LGY	ROU	BRI	JFC	DAR	RCH	DOV	MAR	CLT; DNQ	CAR	MAR									NA	-	
1989	Baker-Schiff Racing	87	Pontiac	DAY	CAR; 25	MAR	HCY	DAR; 41	BRI	NZH	SBO	LAN	NSV	**CLT**; 22	DOV	ROU	LVL	VOL	MYB	SBO	HCY	DUB	IRP	ROU	BRI	DAR	RCH	DOV	MAR	CLT	CAR	MAR							69th	225	
1990	Hendrick Motorsports	46	Chevy	DAY; 3	RCH	CAR	MAR	HCY	DAR	BRI	LAN	SBO	NZH	HCY	CLT; 12	DOV	ROU	VOL	MYB	OXF	NHA	SBO	DUB	IRP	ROU	BRI													45th	654	
1990	Darrell Waltrip Motorsports	17	Chevy																								**DAR**; 33	RCH; 31	DOV; 35	MAR									45th	654	
1990	Hendrick Motorsports	15	Chevy																												CLT; 2	NHA	CAR	MAR					45th	654	
1995	Sacks Motorsports	33	Pontiac	DAY	CAR	RCH	ATL	NSV	DAR	BRI	HCY	NHA	NZH	CLT; 34	DOV	MYB	GLN	MLW	TAL; DNQ	SBO	IRP	MCH	BRI	DAR	RCH; 30	DOV	CLT; 44	CAR	HOM; 36										70th	220	
1996	Diamond Ridge Motorsports	29	Chevy	DAY	CAR	RCH	ATL	NSV	DAR	BRI	HCY	NZH	CLT	DOV	SBO	MYB	GLN	MLW	NHA	TAL; 1	IRP	MCH	BRI	DAR	RCH	DOV	CLT	CAR											57th	338	
1996	BACE Motorsports	7	Chevy																										HOM; 31										57th	338	
1997	Laughlin Racing	45	Chevy	DAY; 6	CAR; 16	RCH; 30	ATL; DNQ		DAR; 16		TEX; 14	BRI; 33	NSV	TAL; 34	NHA	NZH; 18	CLT; 15	DOV; 38	SBO	GLN	MLW	MYB	GTY	IRP															34th	1420	
1997	Laughlin Racing	45	Ford					LVS; 6		HCY; 15																													34th	1420	
1997	Bobby Jones Racing	50	Pontiac																						MCH; DNQ	BRI	DAR	RCH	DOV										34th	1420	
1997	Shaver Motorsports	49	Chevy																											CLT; 42	CAL	CAR; 29	HOM; 33						34th	1420	
1999	GTS Motorsports	90	Chevy	DAY	CAR	LVS	ATL	DAR	TEX	NSV	BRI	TAL	CAL	NHA	RCH	NZH	CLT	DOV	SBO	GLN	MLW	MYB	PPR	GTY	IRP	MCH; DNQ	BRI	DAR; DNQ	RCH	DOV	CLT; 34	CAR	MEM	PHO; DNQ	HOM; DNQ				123rd	61	
2000	Petty-Huggins Motorsports	84	Chevy	DAY; DNQ	CAR	LVS	ATL	DAR	BRI	TEX	NSV	TAL	CAL	RCH	NHA	CLT	DOV	SBO	MYB	GLN	MLW	NZH	PPR	GTY	IRP	MCH	BRI	DAR	RCH	DOV	CLT	CAR	MEM	PHO	HOM				NA	-	
2004	Davis Motorsports	0	Chevy	DAY	CAR	LVS	DAR	BRI	TEX	NSH; DNQ	TAL	CAL	GTY	RCH	NZH	CLT	DOV; 40	NSH	KEN	MLW	DAY	CHI	NHA	PPR	IRP	MCH	BRI	CAL	RCH	DOV	KAN	CLT	MEM	ATL	PHO	DAR	HOM		144th	43	
2005	GIC-Mixon Motorsports	7	Chevy	DAY	CAL	MXC	LVS	ATL	NSH	BRI	TEX	PHO	TAL; DNQ	DAR	RCH	CLT	DOV	NSH	KEN	MLW	DAY	CHI	NHA	PPR	GTY	IRP	GLN	MCH	BRI	CAL	RCH	DOV	KAN	CLT	MEM	TEX	PHO	HOM	NA	-	
2010	JR Motorsports	88	Chevy	DAY	CAL	LVS	BRI	NSH	PHO	TEX	TAL	RCH	DAR	DOV	CLT	NSH	KEN	ROA	NHA	DAY; 21	CHI	GTY	IRP	IOW	GLN	MCH	BRI	CGV	ATL	RCH	DOV	KAN	CAL	CLT	GTY	TEX	PHO	HOM	113th	100	

==== Craftsman Truck Series ====
NASCAR Craftsman Truck Series results
Year	Team	No.	Make	1	2	3	4	5	6	7	8	9	10	11	12	13	14	15	16	17	18	19	20	21	22	23	24	25	NCTC	Pts	Ref
2004	Ron Rhodes Racing	48	Dodge	DAY; DNQ	ATL; DNQ	MAR	MFD	CLT	DOV	TEX; 32	MEM	MLW	KAN	KEN	GTW	MCH	IRP	NSH	BRI	RCH	NHA	LVS	CAL	TEX	MAR	PHO	DAR	HOM	106th	67	

=== ARCA Re/Max Series ===
(key) (Bold – Pole position awarded by qualifying time. Italics – Pole position earned by points standings or practice time. * – Most laps led.)

ARCA Re/Max Series results
Year	Team	No.	Make	1	2	3	4	5	6	7	8	9	10	11	12	13	14	15	16	17	18	19	20	21	22	23	ARMC	Pts	Ref
1985		5	Chevy	ATL	DAY	ATL	TAL; 40	ATL	SSP	IRP	CSP	FRS	IRP	OEF	ISF	DSF	TOL										NA	0	
2003	Bobby Jones Racing	88	Ford	DAY; 7	ATL	NSH	SLM	TOL	KEN	CLT	BLN	KAN	MCH	LER	POC												40th	680	
2003	Bobby Jones Racing	88	Dodge													POC; 26	NSH	ISF	WIN	DSF	CHI; 2	SLM	TAL	CLT; 19	SBO		40th	680	
2004	Bobby Jones Racing	88	Dodge	DAY; 28	NSH; 38	SLM	KEN	TOL	CLT	KAN	POC	MCH	SBO	BLN	KEN	GTW	POC	LER	NSH	ISF	TOL	DSF	CHI	SLM	TAL		139th	135	
2005	Bobby Jones Racing	88	Dodge	DAY	NSH	SLM	KEN	TOL	LAN	MIL	POC	MCH	KAN	KEN	BLN	POC	GTW	LER	NSH	MCH	ISF	TOL	DSF	CHI; 17	SLM	TAL	127th	145	
2008	Bobby Jones Racing	50	Dodge	DAY; DNQ	SLM	IOW	KAN	CAR	KEN	TOL	POC	MCH	CAY	KEN	BLN	POC	NSH	ISF	DSF	CHI	SLM	NJE	TAL	TOL			NA	-	
