= SplitFire =

Spark plug manufacturer

SplitFire was a company that manufactured a spark plug featuring a split ground electrode. SplitFire claimed that its "V" electrode design improved combustion by allowing the ignited flame to pass through the gap in the electrode, instead of around it.

== History ==
SplitFire spark plugs were popular and heavily advertised in the early 1990s. The manufacturer also sponsored the SplitFire Spark Plug 500 NASCAR stock car race, the SplitFire 200, various other powersports, and the Pro Bowlers Association SplitFire Spark Plug Open.

In 1997, the United States Federal Trade Commission charged SplitFire with deceptive advertising. The manufacturer settled the charges with the FTC; as part of the settlement, SplitFire was prohibited from making what the FTC considered deceptive claims about fuel economy or emissions.

After the settlement, the popularity of SplitFire's spark plug range declined. In 2002, it was still considered a leading sparkplug manufacturer, but by 2015, the company's products were not broadly distributed, and its official website had been removed.
