= Richard Petty =

American racing driver (born 1937)

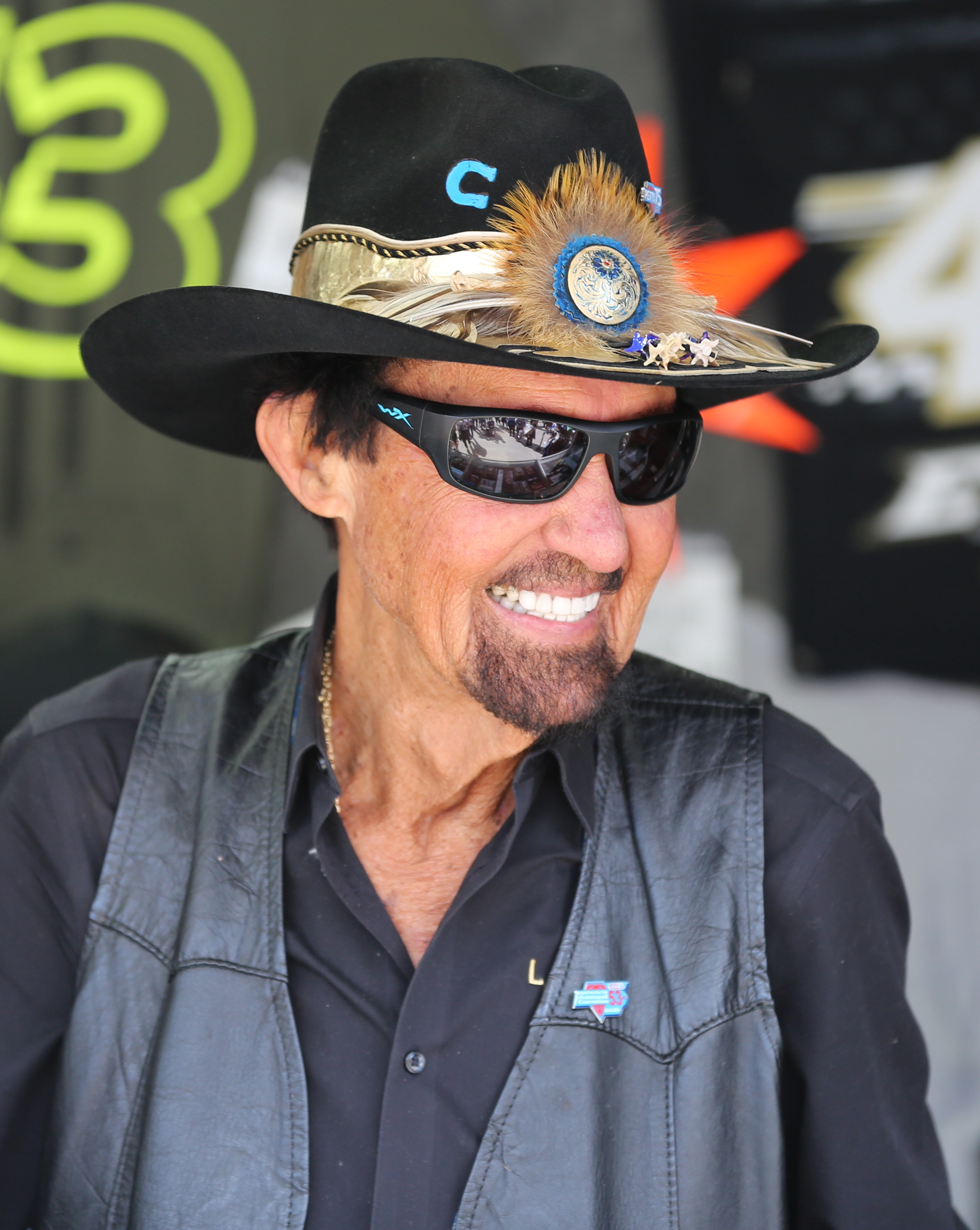
- Petty at Las Vegas Motor Speedway in 2024
- Born: July 2, 1937 (age 89); Level Cross, North Carolina, U.S.
- Achievements: 1964, 1967, Grand National Series Champion; 1971, 1972, 1974, 1975, 1979 Winston Cup Series Champion; 1964, 1966, 1971, 1973, 1974, 1979, 1981 Daytona 500 Winner; 1967 Southern 500 Winner; 1975, 1977 World 600 Winner; 1983 Winston 500 Winner; Records: All-Time Wins Leader in NASCAR Cup Series (200); Tied with Dale Earnhardt and Jimmie Johnson for most NASCAR Cup Series Championships (7); All-Time Poles Leader in NASCAR Cup Series (123); Holds record for most NASCAR Cup Series wins in a season (27 in 1967); Holds record for most consecutive NASCAR Cup Series wins (10 in 1967); Most all time wins at Daytona International Speedway (10)
- Awards: 1959 Grand National Series Rookie of the Year; NASCAR's Most Popular Driver (1962, 1964, 1968, 1970, 1974, 1975, 1976, 1977, 1978); Motorsports Hall of Fame of America (1989); International Motorsports Hall of Fame (1997); NASCAR Hall of Fame (2010); Diecast Hall of Fame (2011); Named one of NASCAR's 50 Greatest Drivers (1998); Named one of NASCAR's 75 Greatest Drivers (2023); Presidential Medal of Freedom (1992); North Carolina Award (2026)

NASCAR Cup Series career
- 1,184 races run over 35 years
- Best finish: 1st (1964, 1967, 1971, 1972, 1974, 1975, 1979)
- First race: 1958 Jim Mideon 500 (Toronto)
- Last race: 1992 Hooters 500 (Atlanta)
- First win: 1960 untitled race (Southern States)
- Last win: 1984 Firecracker 400 (Daytona)
Wins	Top tens	Poles
200	712	123

NASCAR Convertible Division career
- 15 races run over 2 years
- Best finish: 4th (1959)
- First race: 1958 Race No. 14 (Columbia)
- Last race: 1959 Race No. 14 (Greenville-Pickens)
- First win: 1959 Race No. 13 (Columbia)
Wins	Top tens	Poles
1	8	10

Richard Lee Petty (born July 2, 1937), nicknamed "the King", is an American former stock car racing driver who competed from 1958 to 1992 in the former NASCAR Grand National and Winston Cup Series (now called the NASCAR Cup Series), most notably driving the No. 43 Plymouth/Pontiac for Petty Enterprises. He is one of the members of the Petty racing family. He was the first driver to win the Cup Series championship seven times (a record now tied with Dale Earnhardt and Jimmie Johnson), while also winning a record 200 races during his career. This included winning the Daytona 500 a record seven times and winning a record 27 races in one season (1967). Petty is widely regarded as one of the greatest drivers in NASCAR history.

Petty was inducted into the inaugural class of the NASCAR Hall of Fame in 2010. He is also statistically the most accomplished driver in the history of NASCAR, having racked up most wins (two-hundred), most poles (123), tied for most championships (seven), most wins in a season (27), most Daytona 500 wins (seven), most consecutive wins (ten) and most starts (1,185).

He earns broad respect in motorsport where beyond driving, he remains very active as both a team ambassador (Legacy Motor Club) in the Cup Series and owner of Petty's Garage (a car restoration and modification shop) in Level Cross, North Carolina. During his 35-year career, Petty collected a record number of poles (123) and over seven-hundred top-ten finishes in a record 1,184 starts, including 513 consecutive starts from 1971 to 1989. Petty was the first driver to win in his 500th race start, being joined by Matt Kenseth in 2013.

The Richard Petty Museum was formerly in nearby Randleman, North Carolina, but moved back to its original location in Level Cross in March 2014. Petty has also voiced a role in Disney/Pixar's animated films Cars and Cars 3, playing Strip "The King" Weathers, a character partially based on himself. He has also been active in Republican politics, serving as a county commissioner for sixteen years and making an unsuccessful run for North Carolina Secretary of State in 1996.

== Early life ==
Petty was born in Level Cross, North Carolina, the son of Elizabeth Petty (née Toomes) and Lee Arnold Petty, also a NASCAR driver, and the older brother of NASCAR personality Maurice Petty. Growing up Petty enjoyed whittling and would work at his uncles tobacco fields. He was educated in Randleman, North Carolina and attended Randleman High School, where he was an All-Conference guard on the football team. After his 1955 graduation, he took a business course at Greensboro Junior College, then began work for his father's racing company, Petty Enterprises.

== Racing career ==
Petty began his NASCAR career on July 18, 1958, sixteen days after his 21st birthday. His first race was held at CNE Stadium in Toronto, Ontario, Canada (the site of BMO Field and the Honda Indy Toronto currently). In 1959, he was named NASCAR Rookie of the Year, after he produced nine top-ten finishes, including six top-five finishes. That year, he had participated in the inaugural Daytona 500 at the new Daytona International Speedway, but after his day ended due to engine trouble, he joined his father Lee's pit crew, who won the race. In Lakewood, Georgia in 1959, Petty won his first race, but his father Lee protested, complaining of a scoring error on the officials' part. Hours later, Lee was awarded the win.

=== First championship rides (1960–1970) ===
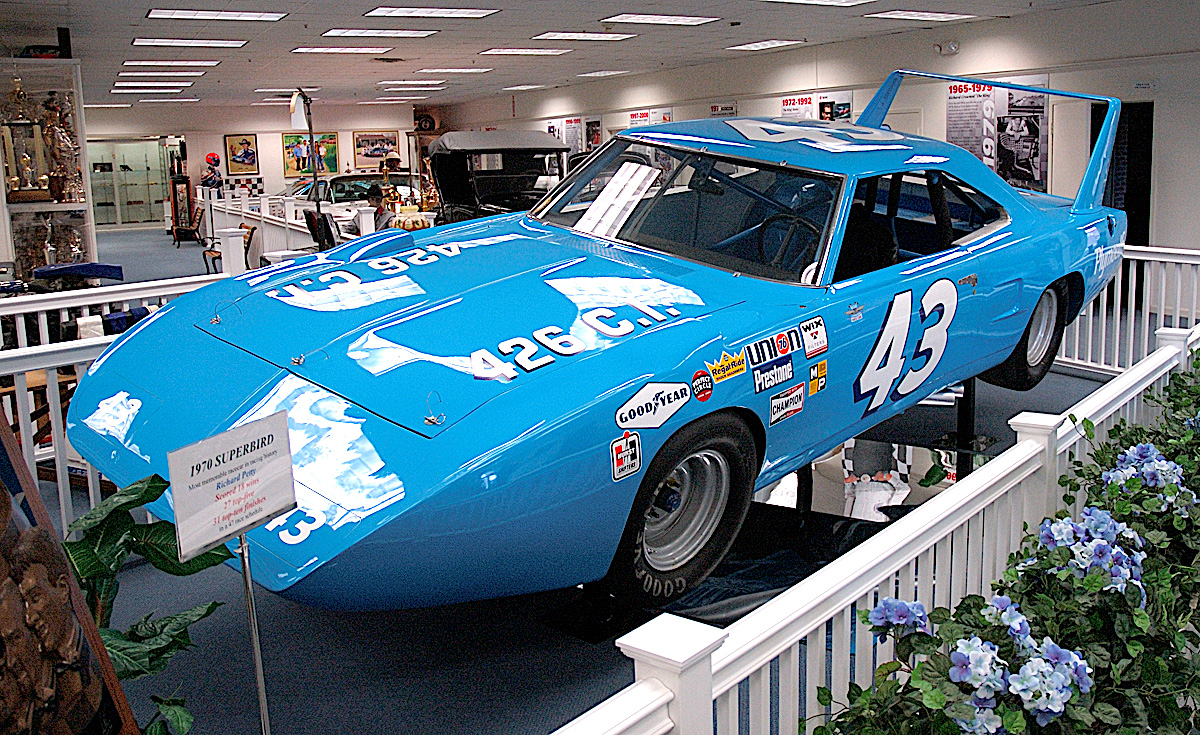
Petty's famous Plymouth Superbird, on display at The Richard Petty Museum in Randleman, North Carolina

In 1960, he finished second in the NASCAR Grand National Points Race, and got his first career win at the Charlotte Fairgrounds Speedway. 1963 was his breakout year, winning at tracks like Martinsville and Bridgehampton. In 1964, driving a potent Plymouth with a new Hemi engine, Petty led 184 of the 200 laps to capture his first Daytona 500, en route to nine victories, earning over $114,000 and his first Grand National championship.

Joining in the Chrysler boycott of NASCAR due to the organizing body's ban of the Hemi engine, Petty spent much of 1965 competing as a drag racer. Petty Enterprises installed the Hemi in the new compact Barracuda and lettered "OUTLAWED" on the door. He crashed this car at Southeastern Dragway, in Dallas, Georgia, on February 28, 1965, killing an eight-year-old boy and injuring seven others. Petty, his father Lee, and Chrysler Corporation faced lawsuits totaling more than $1 million, though Petty and his team came to settlements with the lawsuits within one month of the suits being filed. Afterwards, a second Hemi Barracuda was built, this time with an altered wheelbase and eventually with Hilborn fuel injection. This car was lettered with a large "43 JR" on the door. The car was very successful, winning its class at the Bristol Spring Nationals and competing in many match races against well-known racers such as Ronnie Sox, Don Nicholson, Phil Bonner, Huston Platt, Hubert Platt and Dave Strickler. Even after returning to NASCAR once the Hemi was reinstated, Richard continued drag racing the 43 JR until early 1966. ± On February 27, 1966, Petty overcame a two-lap deficit to win his second Daytona 500 when the race was stopped on lap 198 of 200 because of a thunderstorm. This made him the first driver to win the event twice. In 1966, he won the first ever race at Middle Georgia Raceway (Morelock 200). Petty broke the half-mile NASCAR record for half-mile tracks with an average speed of 82.023 miles per hour during the 100-mile (160 km) event. He would end up recording 4 wins there in his career, including one in 1970 in which he was very ill before the race. 1967 was a milestone year. In that year, Petty won 27 of the 48 races he entered, including a record ten wins in a row (between August 12 and October 1, 1967). He won his second Grand National Championship. One of the 27 victories was the Southern 500 at Darlington, which would be his only Southern 500 victory. His dominance in this season earned him the nickname "King Richard". He had previously been known as "the Randleman Rocket".

In 1968, Petty won sixteen races including the last ever race at Occoneechee Speedway.

In 1969, Ford significantly ratcheted up their factory involvement in NASCAR when they introduced the Ford Torino Talladega. The Talladega was specifically designed to give Ford a competitive race advantage by being more aerodynamic and thus faster, especially on super-speedway tracks more than a mile long. Petty switched brands to Ford, due to his belief the Plymouth was not competitive on super-speedways; he wanted a slippery Dodge Daytona but Chrysler executives insisted he stay with Plymouth. He would win ten races and finish second in points. He won in 1970 in the sleek new Plymouth Superbird with a shark nose and towel rack wing, Petty returned to Plymouth for the 1970 season. This is the car in which Petty is cast in the Pixar film Cars (2006), in which Richard and Lynda had voice roles.

=== The 1970s ===
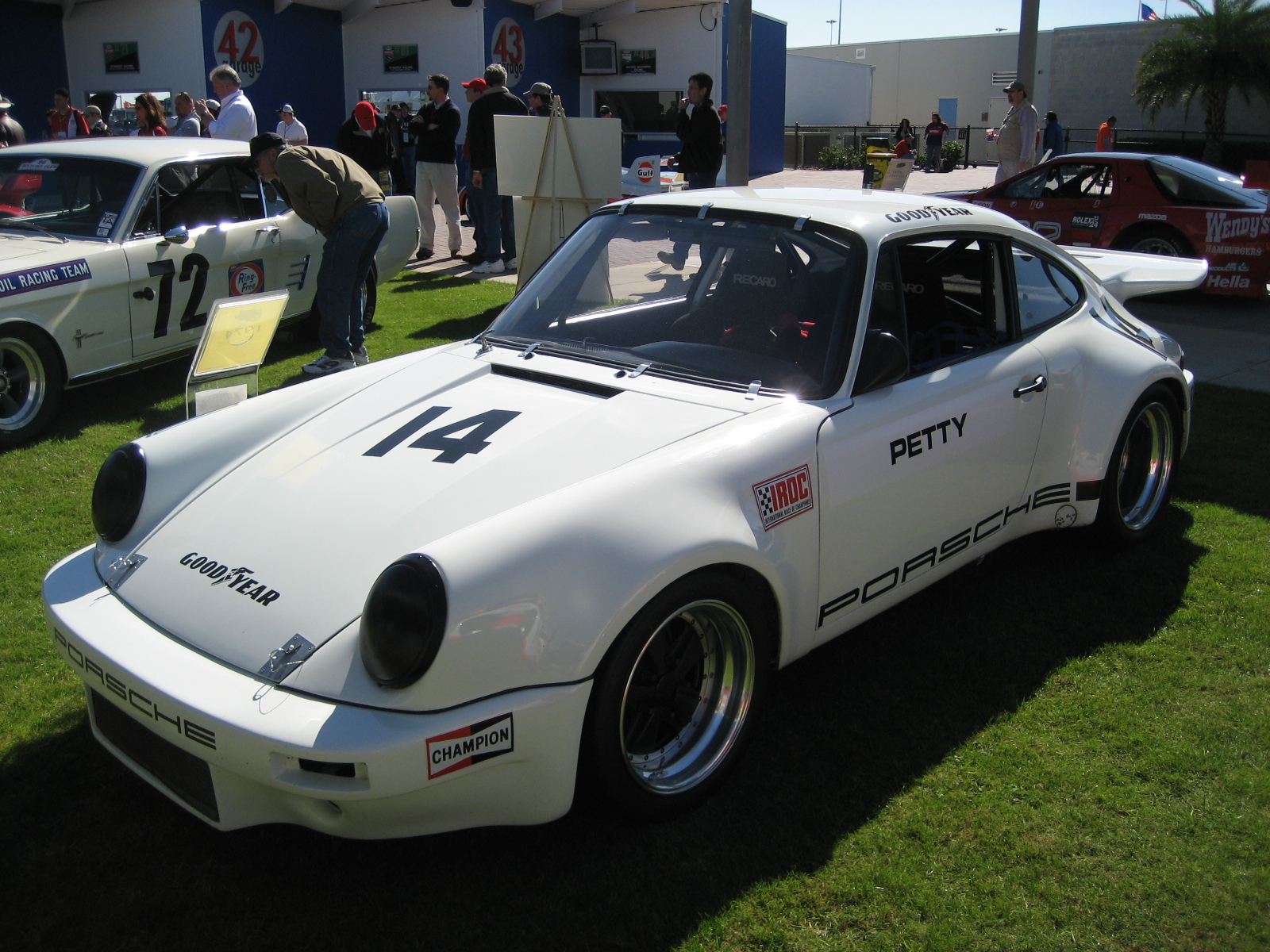
Petty's IROC Porsche 911 from the 1970s

On February 14, 1971, Petty won his third Daytona 500, driving a brand-new (for 1971) Plymouth Road Runner and beating Buddy Baker, by little more than a car length en route to another historic year, making him the first driver to win the race three times. He won twenty more races (which would make him become the first driver to earn more than $1 million in career earnings) and claimed his third Grand National Championship. At the end of the 1971 season, Chrysler told the Pettys they no longer would receive direct factory funding support; this caused the Petty team great concern. In 1972, STP began what would turn into a successful 28-year sponsorship arrangement with Petty, however, it marked the end of his famous all "Petty Blue" paint job. STP previously insisted on an all STP orangish-red color for the cars, but Petty balked and after an all-night negotiation session, the familiar STP orange/"Petty blue" paint scheme was agreed to as a compromise that would later become part of STP's motorsport paint schemes, most notably Gordon Johncock's win in the 1982 Indianapolis 500 (where the car had a primarily "Petty Blue" scheme). Thanks to his 28 top-ten finishes (25 top-five finishes and eight victories), Petty went on to win his 4th NASCAR Cup Series championship. 1972 was a year of change in other ways, as it was the last year where Petty would campaign a Plymouth-based race car; as in the middle of the year, he debuted to drive a newly built 1972 Dodge Charger in a few races (winning one of them), as he believed that the car would have a slight aero advantage over the Plymouth body style. In a driver's duel on February 18, 1973, Petty, in a newly built 1973 Dodge Charger (a body style he would use exclusively until the end of 1977), outlasted Baker (now with the K&K Insurance Dodge race team) to win his fourth Daytona 500 after Baker's engine gave out with six laps to go. A year later, Petty won the Daytona "450" (shortened twenty laps {50 mi/80 km} due to the energy crisis) for the fifth time en route to his fifth Winston Cup Championship.

1975 was another historic year for Petty, as he won the World 600 for the first time in his career, one of thirteen victories en route to his sixth Winston Cup. The thirteen victories is a modern (1972–present) NASCAR record for victories in a season and was tied in 1998 by Jeff Gordon, although Gordon won thirteen out of 33 races, compared to Petty's thirteen out of 30 races. In 1976, Petty was involved in one of the most famous finishes in NASCAR history. Petty and David Pearson were racing on the last lap out of turn 4 in the Daytona 500. As Petty tried to pass Pearson, at the exit of turn 4, Petty's right rear bumper hit Pearson's left front bumper. Pearson and Petty both spun and hit the front stretch wall. Petty's car came to rest just yards from the finish line, but his engine stalled. Pearson's car had hit the front stretch wall and clipped another car, but his engine was running. Members of Petty's pit crew came out onto the track and tried to push the car to the finish line, but ultimately failed. Pearson was able to drive his car toward the finish line, while Petty's car would not restart. Pearson passed Petty on the infield grass and won the Daytona 500. Petty was given credit for second place.

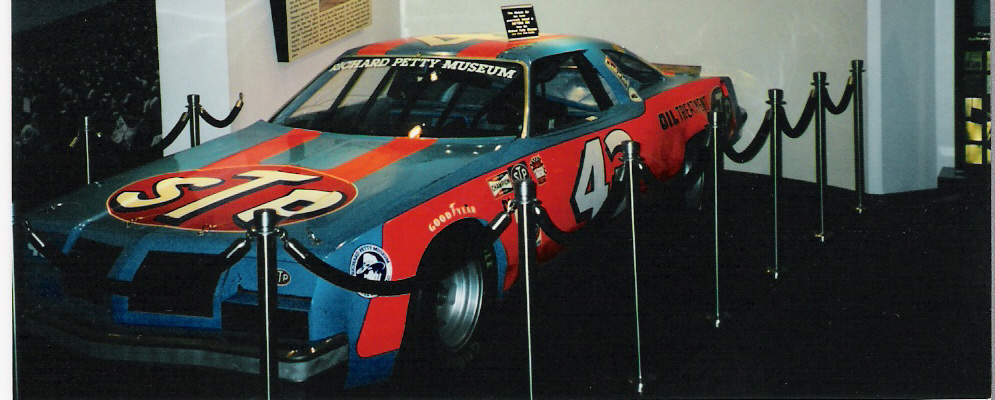
Petty's car used for his 1979 Daytona 500 win, on display at Daytona USA

Oddly, 1978 will stand out as the one year during his prime that Petty did not visit the winner's circle. The Petty Enterprises Team could not get the new 1978 Dodge Magnum to handle properly, even though much time, effort, and faith were spent massaging the cars. Unhappy with the seven top-five and eleven top-ten finishes (including three-second places), Petty decided that his longtime relationship with Chrysler could not continue and he instead began racing a secondhand 1974 Chevrolet Monte Carlo at the fall race at Michigan. Returning to the General Motors fold proved successful as Petty recorded six top-ten finishes in the final ten races of the 1978 season and finished sixth in the final standings. He would go on to even better results in 1979. Petty won the Daytona 500 in an Oldsmobile Cutlass Supreme in the "Famous Finish" and ran most of the remaining races in a Chevrolet, winning four additional races and taking the NASCAR championship for the seventh, and last, time by eleven points which was the closest points margin in NASCAR history until 1992.

=== Twilight years (1980–1991) ===
Petty won two more Daytona 500s in 1979 and 1981. In 1979, he snapped a 45-race drought, winning his sixth Daytona 500, the first to be televised live flag-to-flag; it would become notorious for a fistfight between competitors following the controversial finish. Petty won the race as the first and second place cars of Donnie Allison and Cale Yarborough crashed on the last lap. Petty held off Darrell Waltrip and A. J. Foyt. The race is also regarded as being the genesis of the current surge in NASCAR's popularity. The East Coast was snowed in by a blizzard, giving CBS a captive audience. The win was part of Petty's seventh and last NASCAR Winston Cup Championship. He was able to hold off Waltrip to win the title in 1979.

In 1980, Petty won two races early in the year at North Wilkesboro and Nashville but a violent crash at Pocono in July ended his championship hopes. He finished 4th in points. For 1981, NASCAR dictated that all teams had to show up with the new downsized cars of 110" wheel-base, that Detroit had been building since 1979. Though Petty had been successful with the Chevrolet and Oldsmobile cars he had been running, he wanted to get back to his Mopar roots. After taking a phone call from Lee Iacocca (who personally asked Petty to campaign a Dodge for 1981), the Petty team built a stunning 1981 Dodge Mirada and took it to Daytona in January 1981 for high speed tests. Petty's fans were also in a large part fans of his Dodges, so when word got out about the Mirada testing, 15,000 or so showed up on January 17, 1981, at Daytona Speedway to watch Petty put the Dodge through its paces. Sadly for the fans, the car could do no better than 186 miles per hour, about eight miles per hour slower than the GM and Ford cars. Petty gave up on returning to Dodge knowing that for the superspeedways the Mirada would not be competitive, and bought a Buick Regal for the Daytona race. In the 1981 Daytona 500, Petty used a "fuel only" for his last pit stop, with 25 laps to go, to outfox Bobby Allison and grab his seventh and final Daytona 500 win. This win marked a large change in Petty's racing team. Dale Inman, Petty's longtime crew chief, left the team after the Daytona victory (Inman would win an eighth championship as crew chief in 1984 with Terry Labonte).

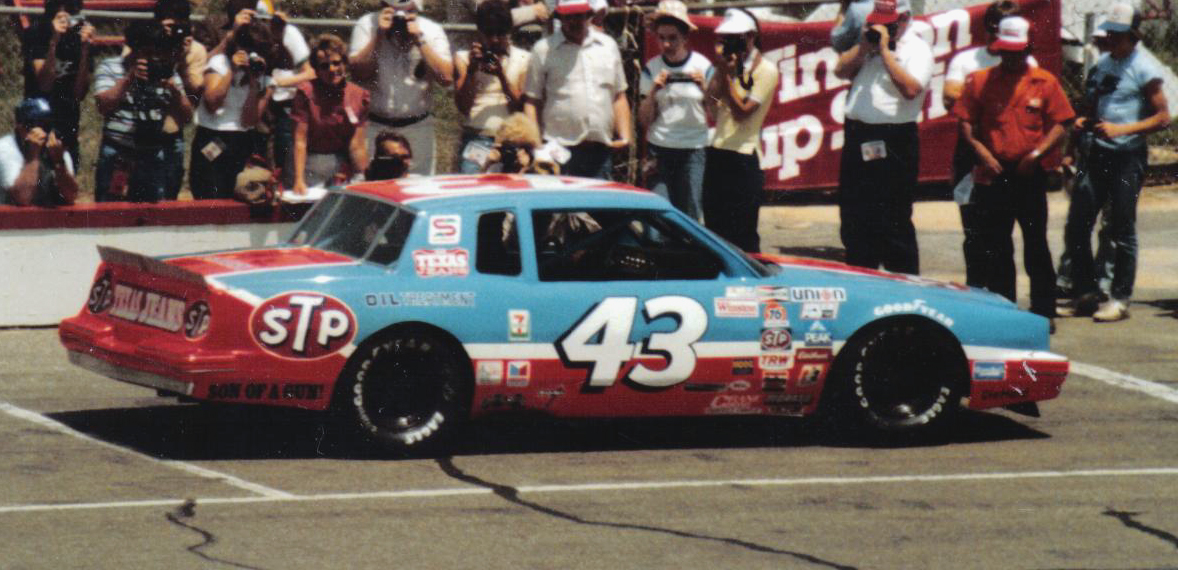
1983 racecar

While the 1981 season gave Petty three wins, he felt the season was a failure, and the Regals being ill-handling and poor in reliability. For 1982, he made the move to the Pontiac Grand Prix, with the promise of substantial factory support from Pontiac. 1982 was a repeat of 1978, and no victories were to be had. At first, the Grand Prix behaved much like the Dodge Magnum of 1978, with handling and speed problems. Toward the end of 1982 things improved with several top-ten finishes, which opened the door to a successful 1983 season with three victories, and several top-five and top-ten finishes. In 1983, he broke his 43-race winless streak from 1982 with a win in the 1983 Carolina 500, barely edging out a young Bill Elliott. After a controversial win at Charlotte in October 1983 (recognised by NASCAR as win No. 198), Petty left the race team his father founded for the 1984 season. He spent '84 and '85 driving for Mike Curb before returning to Petty Enterprises in 1986.

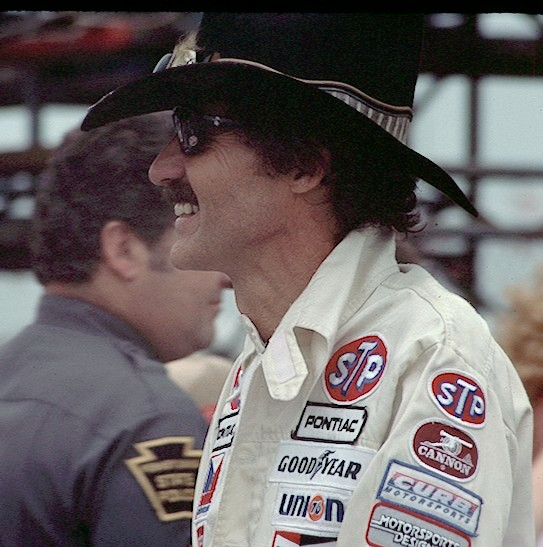
Petty in 1985

Because of the 1971 Myers Brothers 250 combination race in 1971 that Petty finished second in a Grand National Car while winner Bobby Allison drove a Grand American car, there is a technical dispute regarding which race is credited as his 200th win. NASCAR did not credit Petty with a class win, which was a dispute that affected two other drivers, Elmo Langley and Charlie Glotzbach, both of whom drove in combination races that season, finishing second to Grand American cars. Under modern NASCAR combination race rules for various series, Petty would be credited with that would be recognized as his 135th win. On May 20, 1984, Petty won what under modern regulations would be recognized as his two-hundredth Cup class win, the Budweiser 500 at Dover International Speedway, when the Winston-Salem class win is recognized.

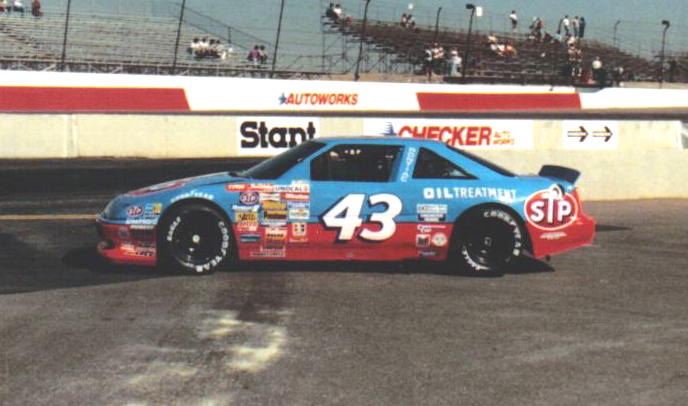
1989 car at Phoenix

On July 4, 1984, Petty won his officially-recognized two-hundredth (and what would turn out to be his final victory) race at the Firecracker 400 at Daytona International Speedway. The race was memorable: On lap 158, Doug Heveron crashed, bringing out the yellow caution flag, essentially turning lap 158 into the last lap as the two drivers battled back to the start-finish line. Petty and Cale Yarborough diced it out on that lap, with Yarborough drafting and taking an early lead before Petty managed to cross the start/finish line only a fender-length ahead. President Ronald Reagan was in attendance, the first sitting president to attend a NASCAR race. Reagan celebrated the milestone with Petty and his family in victory lane.

In early 1988, Petty traveled to Australia to help promote a NASCAR exhibition race at the then new Calder Park Thunderdome, the first NASCAR race outside of North America. While he did not compete in the track's inaugural race, the Goodyear NASCAR 500 (though his son Kyle did), Richard Petty, in testing at the 1.119 mi (1.801 km) track which owner Bob Jane had modeled on the Charlotte Motor Speedway, set an unofficial lap record of 28.2 seconds (142.85 mp/h). This would have in fact landed him on pole position for the race, as the fastest time in official qualifying was by Alabama Gang member Neil Bonnett, who recorded a 28.829-second lap (139.734 mp/h) in his Pontiac Grand Prix.

=== Petty's final ride (1992) ===
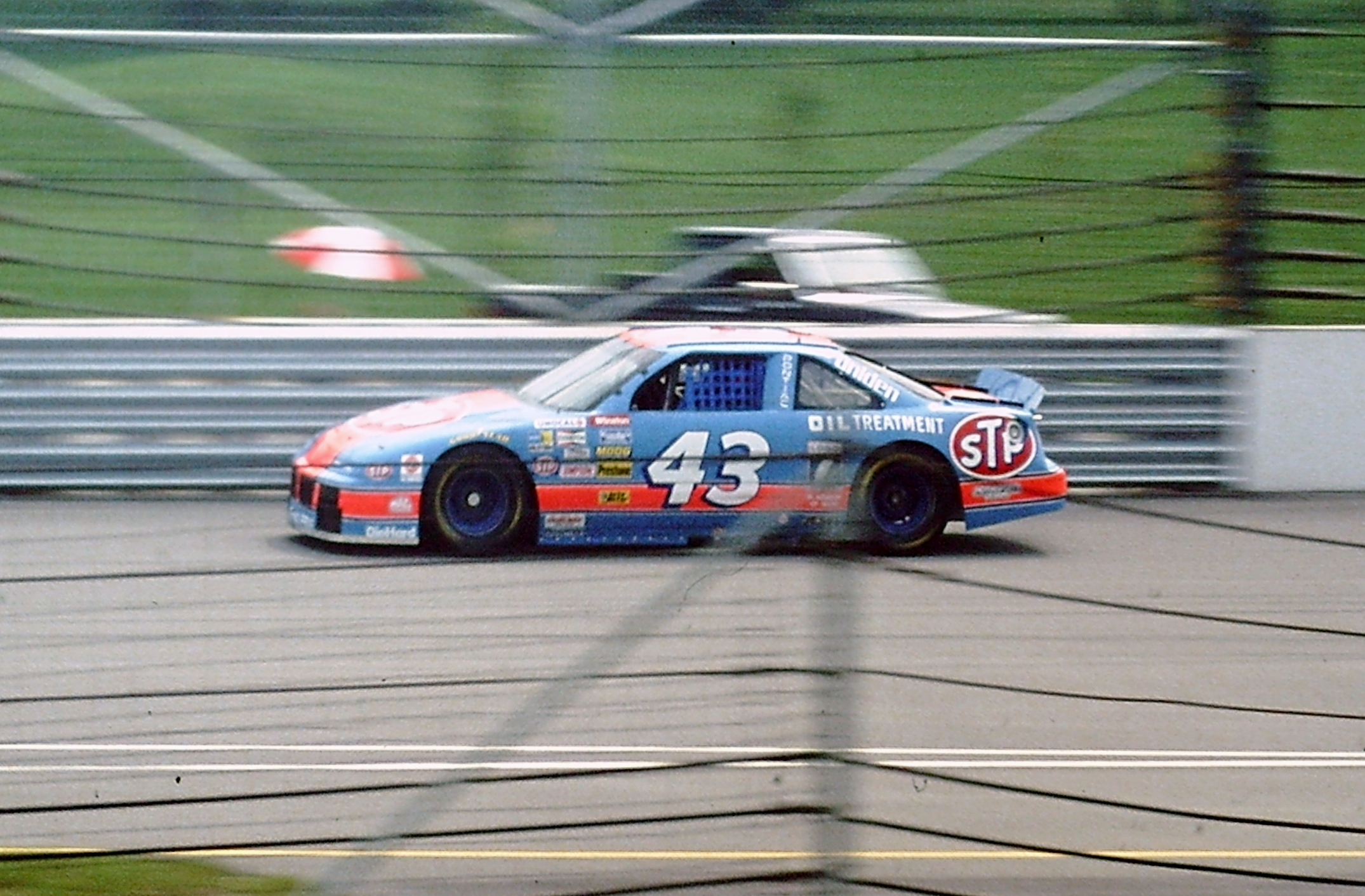
Petty driving the No. 43 during the Brickyard 400 Open Test at the Indianapolis Motor Speedway.

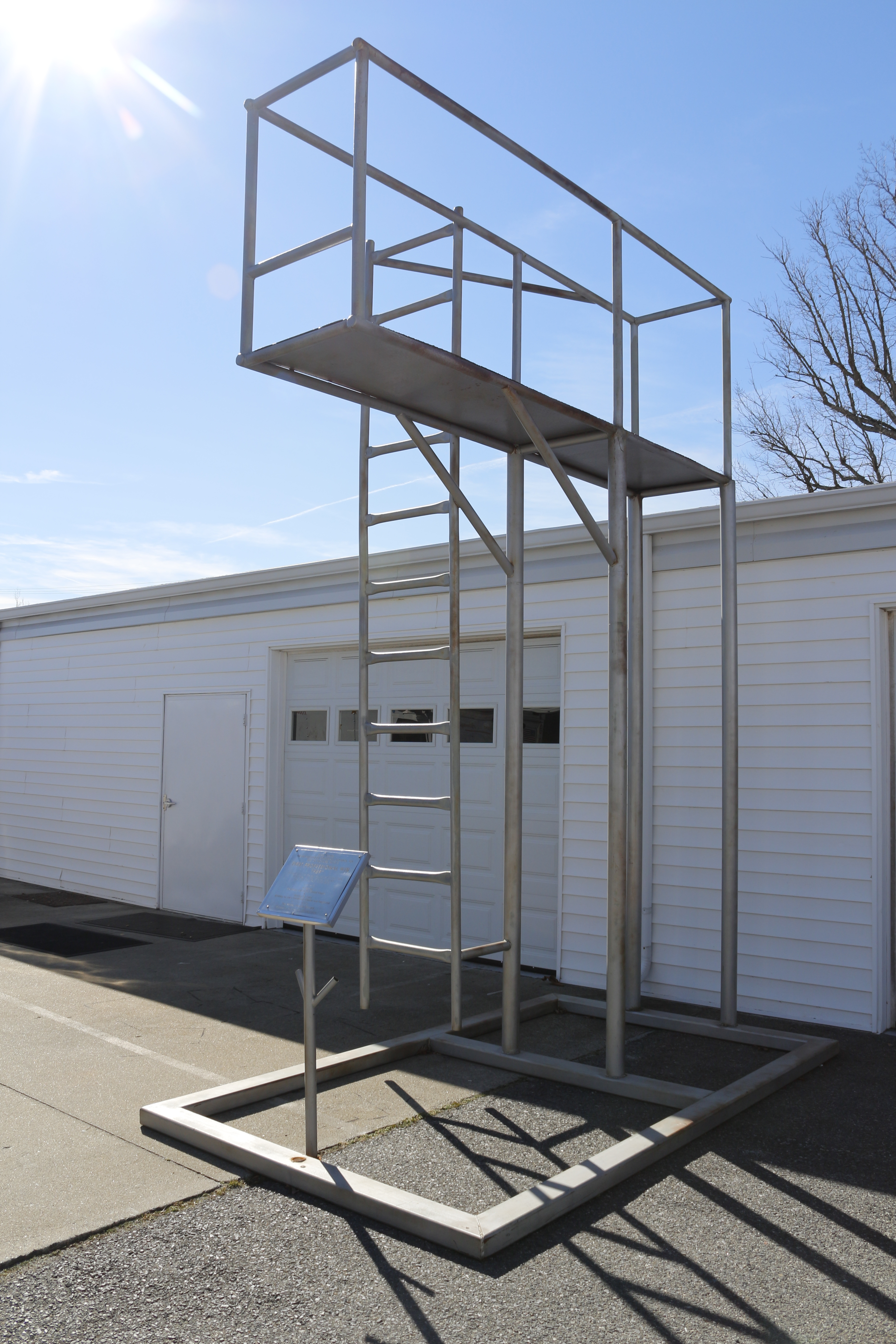
Flag stand from Petty's first win

On October 1, 1991, Petty announced he would retire after the 1992 season. Petty's final top-ten finish came at the 1991 Budweiser at the Glen which was the same race J. D. McDuffie was killed in a fifth lap accident. Petty chose to run the entire 1992 season, not just selected events as other drivers have done before retirement. His year-long Fan Appreciation Tour took him around the country, participating in special events, awards ceremonies, and fan-related meetings. Racing Champions ran a promotional line of diecast cars for every race in Petty's Farewell Tour.

At the 1992 Pepsi 400 on July 4, Petty qualified on the front row for the first time since 1986. Before the start of the race, he was honored with a gift ceremony which included a visit from President George H. W. Bush. When the green flag dropped, Petty led the opening five laps as the holiday crowd cheered wildly. Unfortunately, the oppressive heat forced him to drop out after completing just 84 laps.

Despite the busy appearance schedule and mediocre race results, Petty managed to qualify for all 29 races in 1992. On his final visit to each track, Petty would lead the field on the pace lap to salute the fans. Petty's final race, the season-ending Hooters 500 at Atlanta Motor Speedway, which also marked the start of Jeff Gordon's NASCAR career and the second-closest points championship in NASCAR history, with six drivers mathematically eligible to win the championship, is hailed to this day as the greatest race in NASCAR history. A record 160,000 spectators attended the race and celebrated Petty's farewell. In the intense title race, the championship contender, Davey Allison, got mixed up in a crash with Ernie Irvan, dashing his title hopes. Long-shot contenders Mark Martin, Kyle Petty and Harry Gant fell behind in the long run, which left Bill Elliott and Alan Kulwicki to compete for the title. The race went down to the final lap with Elliott winning and Kulwicki taking the championship by ten points because he had led the most laps, one more than Elliott, which gave him a five-point bonus.

Facing intense pressure, Petty barely managed to qualify at Atlanta, posting the 39th fastest speed out of 41 cars. He would not have been eligible for the provisional starting position, and had to qualify on speed. On the 94th lap, Petty became tangled up in an accident, and his car caught fire. Petty pulled the car off the track, and climbed out of the burning machine uninjured. His pit crew worked diligently with less than twenty laps to go to get the car running again, and with two laps to go, Petty pulled out of the pits and was credited as running at the finish in his final race. He took his final checkered flag, finishing in 35th position. After the race, Petty circled the track to salute the fans one final time in his trademark STP Pontiac.

Thereafter he made a few public show appearances at racetracks. On August 18, 1993, NASCAR participated in a tire test at the Indianapolis Motor Speedway, in preparations for the 1994 Brickyard 400. Petty drove several laps around the track, and then donated his car to the Speedway's museum. He would again step into a racecar in 2003 on the week of the final race under the Winston banner at Homestead–Miami Speedway, where he took a solo lap honoring his seven Winston Cup Championships for Winston's salute to the champions. In 2009 at the Coke Zero 400 in Daytona, for the 25th anniversary of his final, two-hundredth victory in 1984, Petty drove one of his 1980s Pontiac racecars during the pace laps, leading the field for the first one. The field split him and he followed it for one more pace lap before he pulled his car in. Finally, at the 2017 Southern 500 at Darlington, Petty led the field through several pace laps in his Plymouth Belvedere. He apparently stayed out a lap longer than expected and was humorously black flagged by the starter. Petty followed the pace car down pit road at the start of the race.

=== Petty as an owner ===
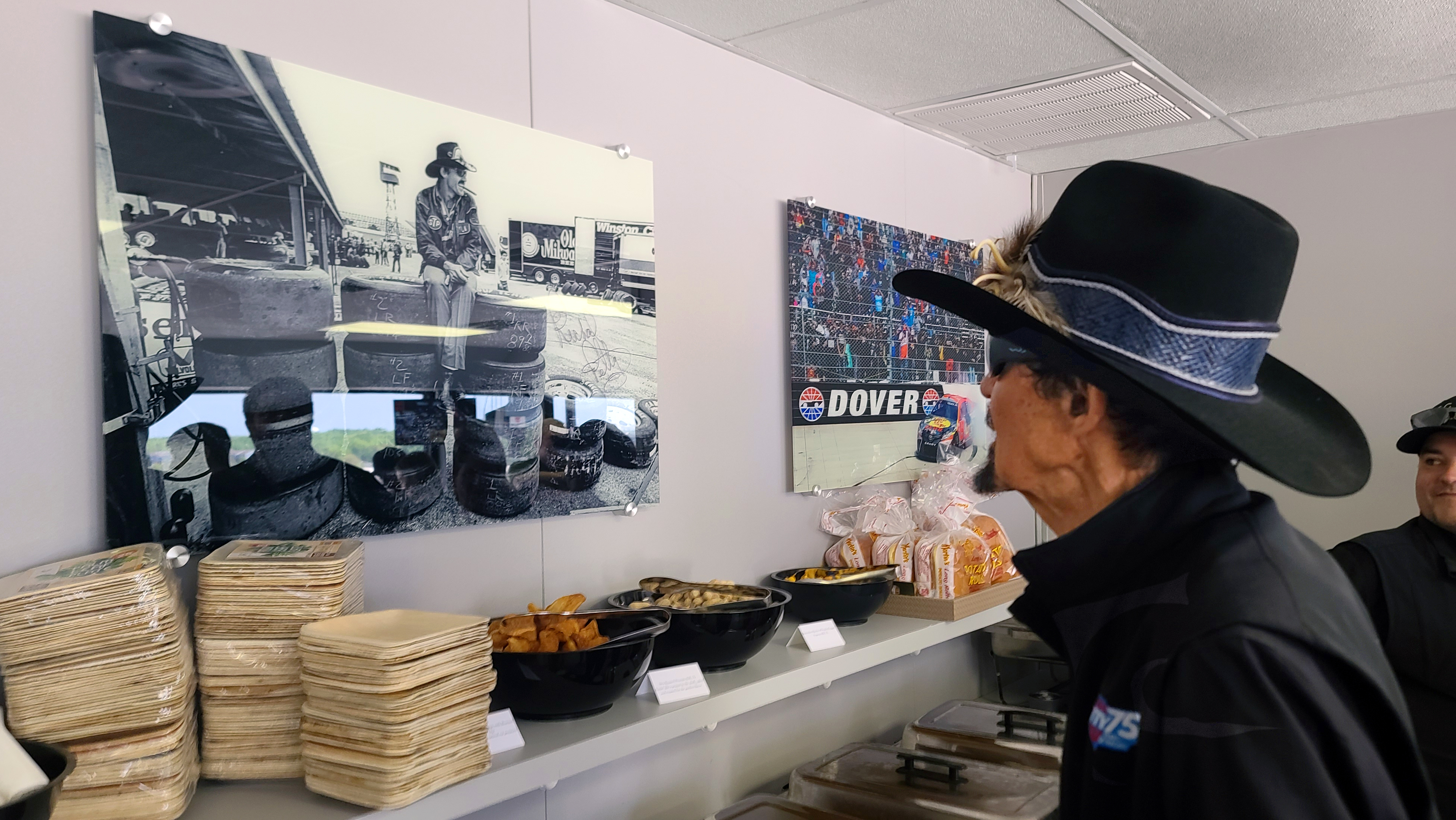
After signing a photo of himself on the wall of a suite at Dover Motor Speedway, Richard Petty takes a moment to reflect on his younger self.

In later years of his career, Petty developed the career of crew leader Robbie Loomis, who was at the helm of Petty Enterprises as crew chief in the 1990s and won three races—the 1996 Checker Auto Parts 500 at Phoenix, the 1997 ACDelco 400 at North Carolina Speedway, both with Bobby Hamilton driving, and the 1999 Goody's Body Pain 500 at Martinsville Speedway, with John Andretti driving. Petty remained as operating owner until his son Kyle Petty took over day-to-day operations a decade later.

However, in 2008, Kyle Petty was released by Petty Enterprises, and, because of lack of sponsorship, Petty Enterprises was bought out by Gillett-Evernham Motorsports. The name was originally going to stay the same, but when Evernham left the team, it was renamed Richard Petty Motorsports, despite George Gillett continuing to own the majority.

In November 2010, an investment group including Medallion Financial Corp., Douglas G. Bergeron and Petty, signed and closed sale on racing assets of Richard Petty Motorsports. Andrew M. Murstein, president of Medallion, had been seeking a sports investment since 2008 when he formed a special-purpose acquisition company together with Hank Aaron, a Medallion board member, and others.

=== Petty as a broadcaster ===
In 1995, Petty moved to the television broadcast booth, joining CBS as a color commentator. Petty worked three races for CBS including the Daytona 500, and one race for TBS, the Coca-Cola 600.

=== Sponsorship ===
Petty promised his mother not to accept alcohol sponsorship. Therefore, he never collected purses for the Bud Pole Award, and he competed at the Busch Clash only once, in 1980.

=== Close calls ===
As well as his numerous victories, Petty is remembered for three of the many disastrous crashes that he survived:

- In the 1970 Rebel 400 at Darlington, Petty was injured when his Plymouth Road Runner cut a tire and slammed hard into the wall separating the track from the pit area. The car flipped several times before coming to rest on its side. This accident injured Petty's shoulder and helped Bobby Isaac to win the 1970 Grand National Championship. During the accident, Petty's head hit the track pavement several times, a mishap that, along with Joe Weatherly's fatal crash six years earlier, led NASCAR to mandate the installation of the Petty-developed safety net that covers the driver's side window.
- In the 1980 Coca-Cola 500 at Pocono Raceway, Petty slammed the Turn 2 wall, nearly flipping the car. He barely escaped, breaking his neck in the wreck, but still raced the next Sunday at Talladega Superspeedway. Modern NASCAR rules require an official series medical liaison to clear a driver after a crash.
- In the 1988 Daytona 500, on Lap 106, Petty got turned by Phil Barkdoll out of turn 4. Petty's car went aloft, tumbled many times, rode along the catch fence, and hurled parts all over the front stretch at the Daytona International Speedway. After several flips, Petty was t-boned by Brett Bodine before coming to a stop. Petty walked away with no serious injuries, except for temporary sight loss due to excessive g-forces. The crash was similar to the accident suffered by Bobby Allison during the 1987 Winston 500 at Talladega Superspeedway and Carl Edwards's 2009 Talladega crash in that, in all three cases, the racers' cars became airborne after turning sideways and damaged the spectator fencing (though much less in Petty's case). Petty's car became airborne despite the use of the carburetor restrictor plate, which was mandated by NASCAR for races at Talladega Superspeedway and Daytona International Speedway just before the start of the 1988 season.

== Legacy ==
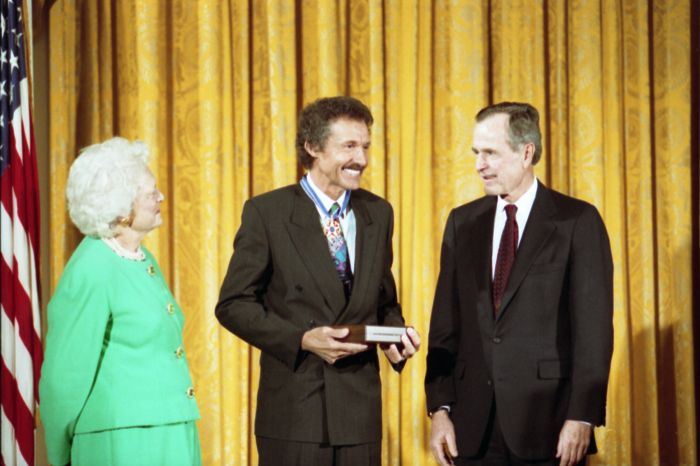
Petty receiving the Medal of Freedom from President George H. W. Bush and First Lady Barbara Bush in 1992

Petty is often regarded as one of the greatest drivers in NASCAR history. He is one of NASCAR's most decorated drivers and won 7 Cup Series championship a record he shares with Dale Earnhardt and Jimmie Johnson. Petty also set a large number of other records during his career which include the most starts (1,185), the most victories (200), 127 pole positions, the most wins in one season (27), the most consecutive wins (10), the most wins from the pole (61) and the most wins from the pole in one season (15). Throughout his career Petty led 51,514 laps which is nearly 20,000 more than the second closest driver Cale Yarborough who led for 31,556 laps during his tenure. Petty also had a record 7 victories at NASCAR’s premier race the Daytona 500. Petty won at least one race or more for 18 straight seasons from 1960-1977 a record that stood for 46 years before he was passed by Kyle Busch in 2023. Petty was able to win on all types of tracks, he ranks first all-time with 55 superspeedway wins, and 139 short track wins. During his career he gained popularity because of his aggressive racing style and accessibility to fans.

In 1998 the Richard Petty Museum was opened in his home town of Level Cross, North Carolina to look into the life and career of Petty while also persevering memorabilia from his career. Petty was ranked 90th in SportsCentury: 50 Greatest Athletes of the 20th Century and was only one of three auto racing drivers to make the list alongside A. J. Foyt and Mario Andretti.

In 2025, Brad Keselowski claimed that Petty was the greatest driver in NASCAR history and that he does not get the credit he deserves stating:

I don't think he gets enough credit for that, particularly nowadays when we become so stat based with everything. We forget just how impressive it is that this guy at one point in his career had won multiple races, multiple championships and been through crashes that he barely lived through, watched other people of similar nature die at races. After experiencing all of that, he got back in the car and won races and championships.

Among his competitors Benny Parsons told the Greenville (S.C.) News in 1972 "The consistency Petty has is remarkable, and the good equipment helps, but there’s something else, He knows everything there is to possibly know in racing. That’s why he’s so great. He deserves everything he wins." A.J. Foyt also called Petty "the greatest stock car driver ever."

The Richard Petty Driver of the Year Award is given out by the National Motorsports Press Association to recognize the NASCAR season’s most outstanding driver.

=== Awards and honors ===
Petty was inducted into the International Motorsports Hall of Fame in 1997, the National Motorsports Press Association Hall of Fame in 1998, and was an inaugural inductee into NASCAR Hall of Fame in 2010. Making him one of 20 racers to compete the "triple crown" of America’s auto racing halls of fame. He was sole stock car representative in the first class inducted into the Motorsports Hall of Fame of America in 1989. He was the first man to be inducted into the North Carolina Auto Racing Hall of Fame in 1997. He was inducted into the Automotive Hall of Fame in 2002, and the North Carolina Drag Racing Hall of Fame in 2016. In 2024, he was inducted into the United States Athletics Hall of Fame. He was named one of NASCAR's 50 Greatest Drivers in 1998 and one of NASCAR's 75 Greatest Drivers in 2023.

Petty was inducted into the North Carolina Sports Hall of Fame in 1973. In 2014, Petty received the Gregor Grant Award from the Autosport Awards. That same year, Petty received the Good Guy Award from the America Legion for his contribution to the community. In 2015, he received the Cameron R. Argetsinger Award for Outstanding Contributions to Motorsports. He received the Petersen Automotive Museum Lifetime Achievement Award in 2017. In 2018, Petty received the NASCAR legacy award from The Sports Museum at TD Garden.

There have been multiple statues dedicated to Petty including one outside of Atlanta Motor Speedway. Another statue of Petty was erected in Randleman, North Carolina in 1992. In 2023, Richard Petty Tribute Park in Randleman was dedicated in his honor a statue of Petty with his wife was also unveiled.

Petty was awarded the Medal of Freedom (the civilian award of the United States) by President George Bush in 1992, the first motorsports athlete ever to be honored with this award. On August 20, 2026, it was announced that Petty will receive the North Carolina Award. In 2003, Petty was honored by The Department of Veterans Affairs being given the Secretary's Award for his contributions to the organization.

The Randolph Community College Education Center is named in Petty's honor and features memorabilia from for his career.

On March 31, 2015 governor Pat McCrory declared "Richard Petty" day in the state of North Carolina. In 2017, Black Mountain, North Carolina named a bridge in his honor.

== Politics ==
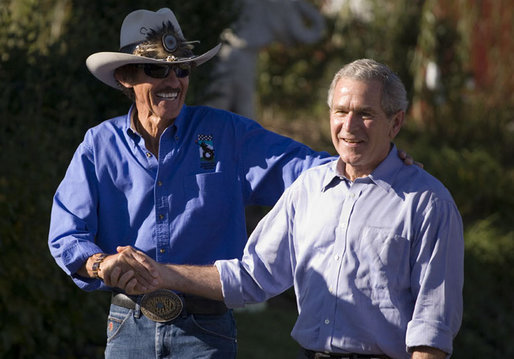
Petty with President George W. Bush in 2006

Petty is a registered Republican. In 1978, Petty was elected to the Randolph County Commission as a Republican. In 1980 he endorsed John Connally for the Republican nomination for president. According to Petty, it was a "tossup" between Connally and Ronald Reagan, but he chose Connally "basically on personality. And Connally's been there in Washington a lot of times doing a lot of things. He knows the system better." He was reelected to the county commission in 1982, 1986, and 1990. By the end of his tenure he had served on the commission for 16 years.

During his 1992 retirement tour, Petty took a parade lap before every race with the exception of the Southern 500, where Democratic presidential candidate Bill Clinton served as grand marshal. In 1993, Petty formed a political action committee to support Republican candidates. He was the Republican nominee in the 1996 North Carolina Secretary of State election, but was defeated by Democratic state senator Elaine Marshall. Petty was mistakenly seen as a shoo-in, and his campaigning was sporadic. Following his loss, Petty stated, "If I had known I wasn't going to win, I wouldn't have run." In 2012 he endorsed Republican presidential nominee Mitt Romney. In June 2016, he made an appearance on stage with Donald Trump. Petty is a Kentucky Colonel.

== Life after racing ==
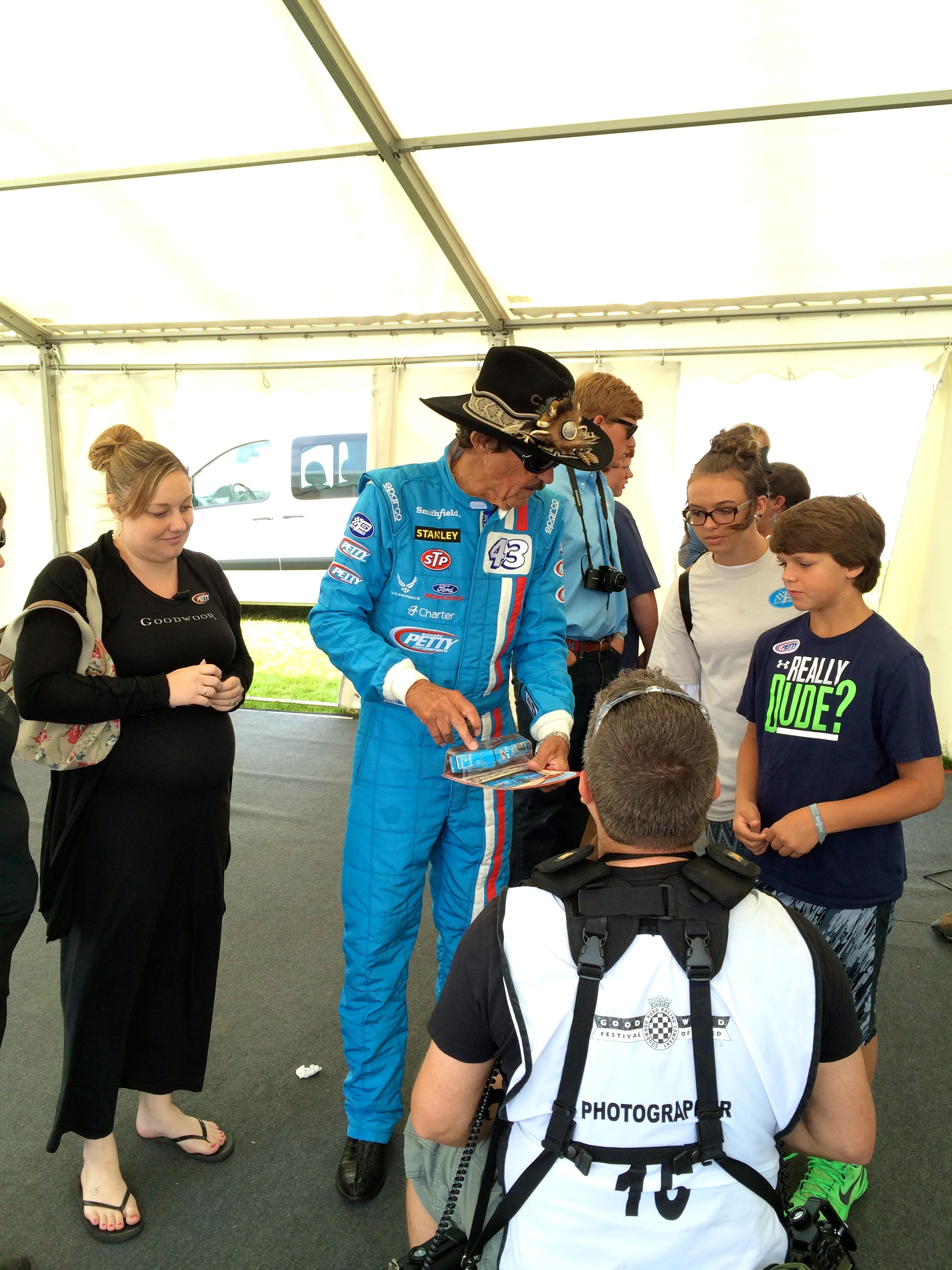
Petty meeting with fans in 2014

Petty is currently a spokesman for Liberty Medical, Cheerios and the GlaxoSmithKline products Nicorette and Goody's Headache Powder. His portrait was featured on Brawny paper towels during a limited time when the company replaced their image with several "real Brawny men". General Mills created a Petty-themed packaged cereal, "43's," its boxes featuring his image and story. Petty also played himself in the 2008 film Swing Vote, where he commends the film's protagonist by allowing him to briefly drive his famous "43" Plymouth.

In 1997 the Richard Petty driving experience was opened in Walt Disney World which offered the public a chance to drive stock cars at Walt Disney World Speedway. The experience has since expanded to various racetracks across the United States.

For public benefit, Petty and his son Kyle have lent their talent to host "Lifting It Right", an automotive lift safety training DVD produced and distributed by the Automotive Lift Institute (ALI); it is used in high school vocational programs and community colleges. He has recorded public service announcements for Civitan International, a nonprofit organization of which he is a former member. He has also established a summer camp known as "Victory Junction", which is intended to give seriously ill children an outdoors, summer-camp experience and has medical staff on hand around the clock in case of emergencies. He and Kyle both sit on the camps board of directors and in 2025, Petty donated an additional 403 acres of land to the camp.

In May 2011, Petty was chosen to be the Grand Marshal for the 2011 STP 400 of the Sprint Cup Series.

After retirement, Petty purchased a 90-acre (36 ha) ranch south of Jackson, Wyoming. Petty takes part in the yearly NASCAR Day Festival in Randleman, North Carolina which honors Petty and his family.

In public, he is usually seen wearing his trademark sunglasses and a Charlie 1 Horse cowboy hat, with a large snakeskin hat band and a plume of rooster feathers at the front.

== Personal life ==
Petty is a second-generation driver. His father, Lee Petty, won the first Daytona 500 in 1959 and was also a three-time NASCAR champion. He was born on July 2, 1937. In 1958, Petty married Lynda Owens, who would die of cancer on March 25, 2014, at her home in Level Cross, North Carolina at the age of 72. Lynda's brother Randy Owens was a member of Petty's pit crew and killed at age 19 during a pit road accident when a water tank exploded during the 1975 Winston 500. Richard and Lynda had four children, including Kyle Petty. The family resides in Petty's home town of Level Cross, North Carolina.

Petty's son Kyle is also a former NASCAR driver. His grandson, Adam (Kyle's son), was killed in a practice crash at New Hampshire Motor Speedway on May 12, 2000, five weeks after the death of Lee Petty. Adam's brother Austin is Emeritus Chairman and Founder of Victory Junction, a SeriousFun Children's Network camp established by the Pettys after Adam's death. Petty’s other grandson Thad Moffitt currently competes in the ARCA Menards Series.

In 2008 Petty and his family founded the Petty Family Foundation which supports children, veterans, education in North Carolina. In 2014 he established the Lynda Petty Scholarship in his wife’s honor, which goes to the Randolph Community College Richard Petty Education Center and to a student from the five county high schools who plans to go into the automotive field.

In 1978, 40 percent of Petty's stomach was removed during ulcer surgery. In 1995, Petty successfully underwent surgery for prostate cancer. Petty also broke his neck two times during his racing career, however he continued racing through the injury on both occasions.

== Motorsports career results ==
=== NASCAR ===
(key) (Bold – Pole position awarded by qualifying time. Italics – Pole position earned by points standings or practice time. * – Most laps led.)

==== Grand National Series ====
NASCAR Grand National Series results
Year	Team	No.	Make	1	2	3	4	5	6	7	8	9	10	11	12	13	14	15	16	17	18	19	20	21	22	23	24	25	26	27	28	29	30	31	32	33	34	35	36	37	38	39	40	41	42	43	44	45	46	47	48	49	50	51	52	53	54	55	56	57	58	59	60	61	62	NGNC	Pts	Ref
1958	Petty Enterprises	142	Olds	FAY	DAB	CON	FAY	WIL	HBO	FAY	CLB	PIF	ATL	CLT	MAR	ODS	OBS	GPS	GBF	STR	NWS	BGS	TRN	RSD	CLB	NBS	REF	LIN	HCY	AWS	RSP	MCC	SLS	TOR; 17																																37th	1016	
1958	Petty Enterprises	42A	Olds																																BUF; 11	MCF	BEL; 9	BRR	CLB	NSV	AWS																									37th	1016	
1958	Petty Enterprises	2	Olds																																							BGS; 20	MBS; 16	DAR	CLT	BIR	CSF	GAF	RCH	HBO; 31	SAS; 22	MAR	NWS; 23													37th	1016	
1958	Petty Enterprises	42	Olds																																																			ATL; 35												37th	1016	
1959	Petty Enterprises	24	Olds	FAY; 13	DAY																																																													15th	3694	
1959	Petty Enterprises	43	Olds			DAY; 57	HBO	CON	ATL	WIL; 3						MAR; 7	TRN; 12	CLT; 19	NSV	ASP	PIF	GPS	ATL; 2	CLB	WIL	RCH	BGS; 24	AWS			CLT; 12	MBS; 27	CLT; 20																																	15th	3694	
1959	Petty Enterprises	42	Olds								BGS; 9	CLB	NWS	REF	HCY																																																			15th	3694	
1959	Petty Enterprises	43	Plymouth																										DAY; 26	HEI				NSV; 29	AWS; 26	BGS	GPS	CLB	DAR; 4	HCY	RCH	CSF	HBO; 3	MAR; 15	AWS; 5	NWS; 3	CON; 7																			15th	3694	
1960	Petty Enterprises	43	Plymouth	CLT; 12	CLB; 6	DAY; 10	DAY	DAY; 3	CLT; 1	NWS; 18	PHO	CLB; 6	MAR; 1	HCY; 3	WIL; 7	BGS; 4	GPS; 3	AWS; 9	DAR; 2	PIF; 11	**HBO**; 6	RCH; 6	HMS	CLT; 55	BGS; 4	DAY; 11	HEI; 2	MAB; 2	MBS; 5	ATL; 20	BIR; 2	NSV; 6	AWS; 15	PIF; 13	CLB; 2		BGS; 9	DAR; 6	HCY; 12	CSF	GSP; 7	**HBO**; 1*	MAR; 22	NWS; 6	CLT; 2	RCH; 4	ATL; 7																			2nd	17228	
1960	Petty Enterprises	42	Plymouth																																	SBO; 6																														2nd	17228	
1961	Petty Enterprises	43	Plymouth	CLT; 11	JSP; 4	DAY; 16	DAY	DAY; DNQ	PIF; 2	AWS; 4	HMS	ATL; 24	GPS; 2		BGS; 3	MAR; 8	NWS; 3	CLB; 6	HCY; 20	**RCH**; 1*	MAR; 23	DAR; 32	CLT; 1	CLT	RSD	ASP	**CLT**; 30	PIF; 15	BIR	GPS; 16	BGS; 5	NOR	HAS; 17	STR; 4	DAY	ATL; 3	CLB; 7	MBS; 17	BRI; 4	NSV; 14*	BGS; 5	AWS; 11	RCH; 9	SBO; 20	DAR; 26				ATL; 5	MAR; 17		CLT; 2	BRI; 23		HBO; 10											8th	14984	
1961	Petty Enterprises	42	Plymouth											HBO; 2																																HCY; 17	RCH; 18	CSF			NWS; 3			GPS; 4												8th	14984	
1962	Petty Enterprises	42	Plymouth	CON; 13																																				**CHT**; 4*				STR; 1					HCY; 10	RCH; 4	DTS; 11															2nd	28440	
1962	Petty Enterprises	43	Plymouth		AWS; 7	DAY	DAY; 4	DAY; 2	CON; 2	AWS; 8	SVH; 14	HBO; 2	RCH; 20	CLB; 7	NWS; 1*	GPS; 11	MBS; 2	MAR; 1	BGS; 5	BRI; 16	RCH; 3	HCY; 6	**CON**; 9*	DAR; 15	PIF; 3	CLT; 4	ATL; 23	BGS; 3	AUG; 3	RCH; 19	SBO; 3	DAY; 30	CLB; 20	ASH; 3	GPS; 1	AUG; 2	SVH; 3	MBS; 16	BRI; 3		NSV; 2	**HUN**; 1*	AWS; 7		BGS; 1	**PIF**; 1	**VAL**; 2	DAR; 5*					MAR; 2	NWS; 1*	CLT; 16	ATL; 4										2nd	28440	
1962	Petty Enterprises	41	Plymouth																																																	AUG; 2														2nd	28440	
1963	Petty Enterprises	43	Plymouth	BIR; 2	GGS; 1*	THS; 11	RSD; 41	DAY; 12	DAY	DAY; 6	PIF; 1	AWS; 1	HBO; 3	ATL; 8	HCY; 2	BRI; 4	AUG; 2			SBO; 1*		MAR; 1	NWS; 1*						CLT; 36		ATL; 12	DAY; 8			DTS; 11		ASH; 2	OBS; 16	**BRR**; 1*	BRI; 2		**NSV**; 4	**CLB**; 1*	AWS; 2	PIF; 2	BGS; 2	ONA; 10	DAR; 12	HCY; 15					THS; 1	CLT; 6			RSD; 36								2nd	31170	
1963	Petty Enterprises	41	Plymouth															RCH; 6	GPS; 4		**BGS**; 11			**CLB**; 1	THS; 13		**ODS**; 1	RCH; 2		BIR; 1*			**MBS**; 15								GPS; 1									RCH; 6	MAR; 5		NWS; 26			SBO; 1*										2nd	31170	
1963	Petty Enterprises	42	Plymouth																							DAR; 3*								**SVH**; 15		BGS; 8																DTS; 4					HBO; 6									2nd	31170	
1964	Petty Enterprises	42	Plymouth	CON; 3		JSP; 5*																																																												1st	40252	
1964	Petty Enterprises	43	Plymouth		AUG; 19*		SVH; 1*	RSD; 26	DAY	DAY; 3*	DAY; 1*	RCH; 2	BRI; 8	GPS; 16	BGS; 3	ATL; 7	AWS; 17	HBO; 12	PIF; 15	CLB; 15	NWS; 7	MAR; 6	SVH; 3	DAR; 10	LGY; 17	HCY; 3	SBO; 1*	CLT; 2	GPS; 2	**ASH**; 2	ATL; 2	**CON**; 1	NSV; 1*	**CHT**; 2	BIR; 2	VAL; 13	PIF; 1	DAY; 16*	ODS; 8	OBS; 3	**BRR**; 13		GLN; 21		**BRI**; 2*	**NSV**; 1*	MBS; 2	AWS; 25	DTS; 3	ONA; 1*	CLB; 17	BGS; 2		**DAR**; 3*	HCY; 5			HBO; 16	MAR; 2	SVH; 2	NWS; 19	**CLT**; 3*			JAC; 2	1st	40252	
1964	Petty Enterprises	41	Plymouth																																							ISP; 3		LIN; 2									STR; 15			RCH; 3	ODS; 3						HAR; 1*	AUG; 25		1st	40252	
1965	Petty Enterprises	43	Plymouth	RSD	DAY	DAY	DAY	PIF	ASW	RCH	HBO	ATL	GPS	NWS	MAR	CLB	BRI	DAR	LGY	BGS	HCY	CLT	CCF	ASH	HAR	NSV	BIR	ATL	GPS	MBS	VAL	DAY	ODS	OBS	ISP	GLN	BRI; 17	**NSV**; 1*	CCF; 2	**AWS**; 1*	SMR; 3*	PIF	AUG	CLB; 2	**DTS**; 3	BLV; 20	**BGS**; 2	DAR	HCY; 1	**LIN**; 19	ODS; 1	RCH	**MAR**; 2	NWS; 33	CLT	HBO	**CAR**; 36	DTS								38th	5638	
1966	Petty Enterprises	42	Plymouth	**AUG**; 1																																					CLB; 2	AWS; 18	BLV; 20	**BGS**; 2		**HCY**; 2	RCH; 12	HBO																		3rd	22952	
1966	Petty Enterprises	43	Plymouth		RSD; 25	DAY; 2*	DAY	**DAY**; 1*	CAR	BRI	**ATL**; 25	HCY; 10	CLB; 6	GPS; 2	BGS; 3	NWS; 11	MAR; 3	**DAR**; 1*	**LGY**; 1*	**MGR**; 1*	MON	RCH; 2	**CLT**; 22	**DTS**; 18	**ASH**; 17	PIF	SMR	**AWS**; 1*	**BLV**; 21	GPS	DAY; 29	ODS	BRR	OXF; 3	**FON**; 2	ISP; 15	BRI; 2*	SMR; 29	**NSV**; 1*	ATL; 1*					DAR; 2*				MAR; 23	NWS; 26	CLT; 38	CAR; 28														3rd	22952	
1967	Petty Enterprises	43	Plymouth	AUG; 1*	RSD; 21	DAY	DAY; 5	DAY; 8	AWS; 1*	BRI; 34	GPS; 19	BGS; 2*	ATL; 22	CLB; 1*	**HCY**; 1	NWS; 7	MAR; 1	SVH; 2	**RCH**; 1*	DAR; 1*	**BLV**; 2*	**LGY**; 1*	CLT; 4	**ASH**; 3	**MGR**; 1*	SMR; 1*	BIR; 3	CAR; 1*	**GPS**; 1	**MGY**; 2	DAY; 11	**TRN**; 1*	OXF; 2*	**FDA**; 1*	**ISP**; 1	**BRI**; 1*	SMR; 2	NSV; 1*	ATL; 17*	**BGS**; 1*	**CLB**; 1	**SVH**; 1*	**DAR**; 1*	HCY; 1	RCH; 1*	**BLV**; 1*	**HBO**; 1*	MAR; 1	NWS; 1*	CLT; 18	CAR; 28	AWS; 2														1st	42472	
1968	Petty Enterprises	43	Plymouth	MGR; 2	**MGY**; 1*	RSD; 10	DAY; 8	**BRI**; 2	RCH; 17	ATL; 6	HCY; 1	GPS; 1	**CLB**; 5	NWS; 26	MAR; 15*	AUG; 18	AWS; 3	DAR; 3	**BLV**; 14*	**LGY**; 6	CLT; 38	**ASH**; 1*	MGR; 3	SMR; 1*	BIR; 1*	CAR; 26	GPS; 1	DAY; 21	ISP; 4*	OXF; 1*	FDA; 1*	TRN; 22	BRI; 24	SMR; 1*	**NSV**; 2*	ATL; 5	CLB; 21	**BGS**; 2*	AWS; 26	**SBO**; 1*	LGY; 2	DAR; 20	**HCY**; 4	**RCH**; 1*	BLV; 3	**HBO**; 1*	MAR; 1*	NWS; 1*	AUG; 3	CLT; 32	CAR; 1*	JFC; 2														3rd	3123	
1969	Petty Enterprises	43	Plymouth	MGR; 1*	**MGY**; 2*																																																													2nd	3813	
1969	Petty Enterprises	43	Ford			RSD; 1*	DAY	DAY; 6	DAY; 8	CAR; 5	AUG; 2	BRI; 7	ATL; 9	CLB; 3	HCY; 2	GPS; 5	RCH; 2	NWS; 7	MAR; 1	AWS; 23	DAR; 11	BLV	LGY	CLT; 19	MGR; 3	SMR; 20	MCH; 3	KPT; 1	GPS; 3	NCF; 2	DAY; 5	DOV; 1*	TPN; 25	TRN; 29	**BLV**; 1	BRI; 23	**NSV**; 1*	SMR; 1*	ATL; 3	MCH; 3	SBO; 3	**BGS**; 1	AWS; 23	DAR; 9	HCY; 3	**RCH**; 19	TAL; Wth	**CLB**; 2*	MAR; 1	NWS; 2*	CLT; 27	SVH; 2	AUG; 2	CAR; 32	JFC; 3	MGR; 6	TWS; 21									2nd	3813	
1970	Petty Enterprises	43	Plymouth	RSD; 5	DAY; 6	DAY	DAY; 39	**RCH**; 2*	CAR; 1*	**SVH**; 1*	ATL; 5	BRI; 24	TAL; 7	NWS; 1*		DAR; 18	BLV	LGY	CLT	SMR	MAR	MCH; 28*	RSD; 1*	HCY	**KPT**; 1*	GPS; 19	DAY; 18	AST; 1*	TPN; 2	TRN; 1*	BRI; 5	**SMR**; 1*	NSV; 16	ATL; 1*	**CLB**; 2	ONA; 1*	MCH; 14	TAL; 7	**BGS**; 1*	**SBO**; 1*	DAR; 5	HCY; 2	**RCH**; 1*	DOV; 1*		NWS; 2*	CLT; 23	MAR; 1*	**MGR**; 1	CAR; 6	LGY															4th	3447	
1970	Robertson Racing	43	Plymouth												CLB; 1*																														NCF; 1*																					4th	3447	
1971	Petty Enterprises	43	Plymouth	**RSD**; 20	DAY; 3	DAY	DAY; 1*	ONT; 3	RCH; 1*	CAR; 1*	HCY; 1*	BRI; 2*	ATL; 2	CLB; 1	GPS; 7	SMR; 1*	NWS; 1	MAR; 1	DAR; 20	SBO; 2	TAL; 38	**ASH**; 1*	KPT; 17	CLT; 4	**DOV**; 3	MCH; 6	RSD; 13	HOU; 7	GPS; 1	DAY; 2	**BRI**; 3	**AST**; 1*	**ISP**; 1*	TRN; 1*	**NSV**; 1*	ATL; 1*	**BGS**; 2	ONA; 1*	MCH; 2	TAL; 2	**CLB**; 1	HCY; 3	DAR; 2	MAR; 3	CLT; 4*	DOV; 1	CAR; 1	MGR	RCH; 1*	NWS; 3*	TWS; 1*															1st	4435	

==== Winston Cup Series ====
NASCAR Winston Cup Series results
Year	Team	No.	Make	1	2	3	4	5	6	7	8	9	10	11	12	13	14	15	16	17	18	19	20	21	22	23	24	25	26	27	28	29	30	31	NWCC	Pts	Ref
1972	Petty Enterprises	43	Plymouth	RSD; 1	DAY; 26	RCH; 1	ONT; 4	CAR; 2	ATL; 6	BRI; 3	DAR; 2	NWS; 1	MAR; 1					**RSD**; 23*			BRI; 2	TRN; 3				NSV; 2		RCH; 1*	DOV; 2	MAR; 1	NWS; 1		CAR; 2		1st	8701.4	
1972	Petty Enterprises	43	Dodge											TAL; 5	CLT; 19	DOV; 2	MCH; 3		**TWS**; 1*	DAY; 2			ATL; 2	TAL; 7	**MCH**; 4		DAR; 3					CLT; 10		TWS; 3	1st	8701.4	
1973	Petty Enterprises	43	Dodge	RSD; 21	DAY; 1	RCH; 1*	CAR; 23	BRI; 2	ATL; 34	NWS; 1*	DAR; 7	MAR; 21	TAL; 35	NSV; 13	CLT; 13	DOV; 4	TWS; 1	**RSD**; 2	MCH; 3	DAY; 2	BRI; 21	**ATL**; 33	TAL; 14	NSV; 2	DAR; 4	RCH; 1*	DOV; 7	NWS; 2*	MAR; 1	CLT; 2	**CAR**; 35				5th	6877.95	
1974	Petty Enterprises	43	Dodge	RSD; 2	DAY; 1	RCH; 2	CAR; 1*	BRI; 23	ATL; 6	DAR; 20	NWS; 1*	MAR; 2	TAL; 3	NSV; 1	DOV; 3	CLT; 2	RSD; 25	MCH; 1*	DAY; 2	**BRI**; 3	NSV; 13*	ATL; 1	POC; 1*	TAL; 1	MCH; 2	**DAR**; 35	**RCH**; 1*	DOV; 1*	**NWS**; 2	**MAR**; 29	CLT; 2	**CAR**; 3	**ONT**; 15*		1st	5037.75	
1975	Petty Enterprises	43	Dodge	RSD; 7	DAY; 7	**RCH**; 1*	CAR; 3	BRI; 1*	**ATL**; 1*	NWS; 1*	DAR; 26	MAR; 1*	TAL; 19	NSV; 7	DOV; 3	CLT; 1*	RSD; 1	MCH; 2	DAY; 1	NSV; 2	POC; 2	TAL; 2	MCH; 1	DAR; 2*	DOV; 1*	**NWS**; 1*	MAR; 22	CLT; 1*	RCH; 28	CAR; 35	BRI; 1*	ATL; 3	ONT; 16		1st	4783	
1976	Petty Enterprises	43	Dodge	RSD; 25	DAY; 2	CAR; 1*	RCH; 2	BRI; 27	ATL; 28	NWS; 2	DAR; 23	MAR; 4	TAL; 4	NSV; 2	DOV; 6	CLT; 2	RSD; 9	**MCH**; 4	DAY; 22	NSV; 2	POC; 1	TAL; 20	MCH; 3	BRI; 2	DAR; 2	RCH; 3	DOV; 2	MAR; 4	NWS; 3	CLT; 8	CAR; 1*	ATL; 28	ONT; 27		2nd	4449	
1977	Petty Enterprises	43	Dodge	RSD; 3	DAY; 26	RCH; 6	CAR; 1*	**ATL**; 1	NWS; 2	DAR; 3	BRI; 3	MAR; 3	TAL; 20	NSV; 5	**DOV**; 3	CLT; 1*	**RSD**; 1*	MCH; 2	DAY; 1*	NSV; 3	POC; 2	TAL; 11	MCH; 8	BRI; 22	DAR; 4	RCH; 2	DOV; 23	MAR; 4	**NWS**; 24*	CLT; 32	CAR; 2	ATL; 6	**ONT**; 2		2nd	4614	
1978	Petty Enterprises	43	Dodge	RSD; 16	DAY; 33	RCH; 22	CAR; 4	ATL; 26	BRI; 25	DAR; 5	NWS; 2	MAR; 3	TAL; 11	DOV; 7	CLT; 8	NSV; 3	RSD; 2	MCH; 6	DAY; 4	NSV; 23	POC; 30	TAL; 7													6th	3949	
1978	Petty Enterprises	43	Chevy																				MCH; 14	BRI; 5	DAR; 3	RCH; 20	DOV; 27	MAR; 6	NWS; 4	CLT; 27	CAR; 6	ATL; 2	ONT; 34		6th	3949	
1979	Petty Enterprises	43	Chevy	RSD; 32		CAR; 32	RCH; 5		NWS; 2*		DAR; 2	MAR; 1*		NSV; 2*		CLT; 2	TWS; 6	RSD; 3	MCH; 5		NSV; 5	POC; 2		MCH; 1	**BRI**; 2	DAR; 9	RCH; 6	DOV; 1	MAR; 2	CLT; 4	NWS; 3	CAR; 1	ATL; 6	ONT; 5	1st	4830	
1979	Petty Enterprises	43	Olds		DAY; 1			ATL; 11		BRI; 4			TAL; 4		DOV; 30					DAY; 5			TAL; 4												1st	4830	
1980	Petty Enterprises	43	Chevy	RSD; 3		RCH; 3	CAR; 2	ATL; 33	BRI; 8	DAR; 9	NWS; 1*	MAR; 3		NSV; 1	DOV; 2	CLT; 4	TWS; 2	RSD; 8	MCH; 5		NSV; 5	POC; 33		MCH; 5	BRI; 4	DAR; 9	RCH; 2	DOV; 17	NWS; 18	MAR; 15	CLT; 27	CAR; 14	ATL; 21	ONT; 30	4th	4255	
1980	Petty Enterprises	43	Olds		DAY; 25								TAL; 31							DAY; 5			TAL; 18												4th	4255	
1981	Petty Enterprises	42	Chevy	RSD; 5																															8th	3880	
1981	Petty Enterprises	43	Buick		DAY; 1	RCH; 3	CAR; 3	ATL; 38	BRI; 29	NWS; 1	DAR; 33	MAR; 28	TAL; 39	NSV; 4	DOV; 19	CLT; 24	TWS; 4	RSD; 3	MCH; 6	DAY; 3	NSV; 9	POC; 2	TAL; 40	MCH; 1*	BRI; 24	DAR; 30	RCH; 11	DOV; 10	MAR; 18	NWS; 21	CLT; 30	CAR; 4	ATL; 26	RSD; 7	8th	3880	
1982	Petty Enterprises	43	Pontiac	DAY; 27	RCH; 2	BRI; 7	ATL; 2	CAR; 30	DAR; 31	NWS; 5	MAR; 15	TAL; 27	NSV; 9	DOV; 24	CLT; 8	POC; 7	RSD; 36	MCH; 26	DAY; 25	NSV; 7	POC; 2*	TAL; 3	MCH; 2	BRI; 26	DAR; 2	RCH; 13	DOV; 30	NWS; 4	CLT; 8	MAR; 3	CAR; 6	ATL; 15	RSD; 31		5th	3814	
1983	Petty Enterprises	43	Pontiac	DAY; 38	RCH; 8	CAR; 1	ATL; 5	DAR; 25	NWS; 10	MAR; 17	TAL; 1*	NSV; 6	DOV; 7	BRI; 5	CLT; 2	RSD; 10	POC; 3	MCH; 11	DAY; 33	NSV; 19	POC; 10	TAL; 4	MCH; 6	BRI; 9	DAR; 12	RCH; 6	DOV; 9	MAR; 9	NWS; 12	CLT; 1	CAR; 26	ATL; 5	RSD; 10		4th	4042	
1984	Curb Racing	43	Pontiac	DAY; 31	RCH; 15	CAR; 4	ATL; 4	BRI; 8	NWS; 12	DAR; 7	MAR; 12	TAL; 6	NSV; 7	DOV; 1	CLT; 34	RSD; 23	POC; 13	MCH; 34	DAY; 1	NSV; 25	POC; 27	TAL; 23	MCH; 9	BRI; 17	DAR; 29	RCH; 5	DOV; 37	MAR; 8	CLT; 9	NWS; 18	CAR; 15	ATL; 8	RSD; 14		10th	3643	
1985	Curb Racing	43	Pontiac	DAY; 34	RCH; 26	CAR; 8	ATL; 13	BRI; 8	DAR; 33	NWS; 21	MAR; 7	TAL; 27	DOV; 7	CLT; 26	RSD; 7	POC; 33	MCH; 30	DAY; 29	POC; 27	TAL; 6	MCH; 37	BRI; 8	DAR; 12	RCH; 3	DOV; 9	MAR; 22	NWS; 8	CLT; 10	CAR; 33	ATL; 10	RSD; 8				14th	3140	
1986	Petty Enterprises	43	Pontiac	DAY; 36	RCH; 20	CAR; 3	ATL; 11	BRI; 14	DAR; 7	NWS; 29	MAR; 28	TAL; 7	DOV; 6	CLT; Wth^{†}	RSD; 6	POC; 19	MCH; 13	DAY; 22	POC; 34	TAL; 37	GLN; 10	MCH; 18	BRI; 7	DAR; 40	RCH; 4	DOV; 12	MAR; 16	NWS; 3	CLT; 35	CAR; 8	ATL; 2	RSD; 21			14th	3314	
1986	U.S. Racing	6	Chevy											CLT; 38																					14th	3314	
1987	Petty Enterprises	43	Pontiac	DAY; 3	CAR; 15	RCH; 23	ATL; 14	DAR; 3	NWS; 6	BRI; 2	MAR; 22	TAL; 16	CLT; 4	DOV; 36	POC; 29	RSD; 6	MCH; 12	DAY; 26	POC; 8	TAL; 37	GLN; 14	MCH; 11	BRI; 5	DAR; 3	RCH; 5	DOV; 9	MAR; 13	NWS; 9	CLT; 5	CAR; 17	RSD; 4	ATL; 30			8th	3708	
1988	Petty Enterprises	43	Pontiac	DAY; 34	RCH; 3	CAR; 41	ATL; 23	DAR; 41	BRI; 6	NWS; 6	MAR; 32	TAL; 20	CLT; 15	DOV; 15	RSD; 6	POC; 26	MCH; 24	DAY; 20	POC; 28	TAL; 21	GLN; 17	MCH; 39	BRI; 8	DAR; 33	RCH; 34	DOV; 38	MAR; 27	CLT; 38	NWS; 18	CAR; 25	PHO; 35	ATL; 36			22nd	2644	
1989	Petty Enterprises	43	Pontiac	DAY; 17	CAR; 16	ATL; 27	RCH; DNQ	DAR; 15	BRI; DNQ	NWS; DNQ	MAR; 24	TAL; 23	CLT; 19	DOV; 20	SON; 26	POC; 25	MCH; 30	DAY; 20	POC; 38	TAL; 21	GLN; 13	MCH; 18	BRI; DNQ	DAR; 35	RCH; 33	DOV; 30	MAR; 24	CLT; 34	NWS; 32	CAR; 34	PHO; 42	ATL; 28			29th	2148	
1990	Petty Enterprises	43	Pontiac	DAY; 34	RCH; 35	CAR; 32	ATL; 25	DAR; 21	BRI; 26	NWS; 29	MAR; 20	TAL; 29	CLT; 27	DOV; 21	SON; 26	POC; 38	MCH; 11	DAY; 36	POC; 9	TAL; 29	GLN; 18	MCH; 33	BRI; 29	DAR; 34	RCH; 21	DOV; 16	MAR; 29	NWS; 17	CLT; 20	CAR; 21	PHO; 23	ATL; 17			26th	2556	
1991	Petty Enterprises	43	Pontiac	DAY; 19	RCH; 11	CAR; 15	ATL; 38	DAR; 37	BRI; 17	NWS; 16	MAR; 14	TAL; 40	CLT; 20	DOV; 17	SON; 34	POC; 11	MCH; 35	DAY; 22	POC; 31	TAL; 18	GLN; 9	MCH; 23	BRI; 12	DAR; 16	RCH; 24	DOV; 20	MAR; 30	NWS; 19	CLT; 12	CAR; 16	PHO; 41	ATL; 22			24th	2817	
1992	Petty Enterprises	43	Pontiac	DAY; 16	CAR; 16	RCH; 21	ATL; 16	DAR; 32	BRI; 27	NWS; 31	MAR; 29	TAL; 15	CLT; 41	DOV; 20	SON; 21	POC; 16	MCH; 15	DAY; 36	POC; 20	TAL; 15	GLN; 28	MCH; 18	BRI; 16	DAR; 20	RCH; 16	DOV; 28	MAR; 18	NWS; 27	CLT; 27	CAR; 25	PHO; 22	ATL; 35			26th	2731	
^{†} – After his backup car was deemed ineligible to race, Petty bought the race slot from D. K. Ulrich

===== Daytona 500 =====
Year	Team	Manufacturer	Start	Finish
1959	Petty Enterprises	Oldsmobile	6	57
1960	Petty Enterprises	Plymouth	19	3
1961	Petty Enterprises	Plymouth	DNQ	
1962	Petty Enterprises	Plymouth	10	2
1963	Petty Enterprises	Plymouth	23	6
1964	Petty Enterprises	Plymouth	2	**1**
1966	Petty Enterprises	Plymouth	**1**	**1**
1967	Petty Enterprises	Plymouth	2	8
1968	Petty Enterprises	Plymouth	2	8
1969	Petty Enterprises	Ford	12	8
1970	Petty Enterprises	Plymouth	11	39
1971	Petty Enterprises	Plymouth	5	**1**
1972	Petty Enterprises	Plymouth	32	26
1973	Petty Enterprises	Dodge	7	**1**
1974	Petty Enterprises	Dodge	2	**1**
1975	Petty Enterprises	Dodge	4	7
1976	Petty Enterprises	Dodge	6	2
1977	Petty Enterprises	Dodge	3	26
1978	Petty Enterprises	Dodge	6	33
1979	Petty Enterprises	Oldsmobile	13	**1**
1980	Petty Enterprises	Oldsmobile	4	25
1981	Petty Enterprises	Buick	8	**1**
1982	Petty Enterprises	Pontiac	21	27
1983	Petty Enterprises	Pontiac	6	38
1984	Curb Racing	Pontiac	34	31
1985	Curb Racing	Pontiac	8	34
1986	Petty Enterprises	Pontiac	10	36
1987	Petty Enterprises	Pontiac	11	3
1988	Petty Enterprises	Pontiac	34	34
1989	Petty Enterprises	Pontiac	34	17
1990	Petty Enterprises	Pontiac	11	34
1991	Petty Enterprises	Pontiac	3	19
1992	Petty Enterprises	Pontiac	32	16

=== International Race of Champions ===
(key) (Bold – Pole position. * – Most laps led.)

International Race of Champions results
Season	Make	1	2	3	4	Pos.	Pts	Ref
1973–74	Porsche	RSD; 7	RSD; 10	RSD; 10	DAY	10th	NA	
1974–75	Chevy	MCH; 10	RSD; 5	RSD; 10	DAY	10th	NA	
1975–76	Chevy	MCH; 6	RSD; 6	RSD; 11	DAY	10th	NA	
1976–77	Chevy	MCH; 6	RSD; 3	RSD; 9	DAY; 4	6th	NA	
1977–78	Chevy	MCH; 4	RSD; 2	RSD; 5	DAY; 8	5th	NA	
1989	Chevy	DAY; 9	NZH; 12	**MCH**; 11	GLN; 12	12th	16	

== Media appearances ==
=== Film ===
Year	Title	Role	Notes
1967	Speedway	Himself	
1972	43: The Richard Petty Story	Himself	
1972	Corky	Himself	
1983	Stroker Ace	Himself	
1989	Speed Zone	Himself	
1990	Days of Thunder	Himself	
2006	Cars	Strip "The King" Weathers	Voice
2008	Swing Vote	Himself	
2011	Petty Blue	Himself	Documentary
2017	Cars 3	Strip "The King" Weathers	Voice

=== Television ===
Year	Title	Role	Notes
1998	Arli$$	Himself	1 episode

=== Video games ===
Year	Title	Role	Notes
2006	Cars	Strip "The King" Weathers	Voice
2013	Disney Infinity	Strip "The King" Weathers	Voice

Sporting positions
Preceded by Joe Weatherly; David Pearson	NASCAR Grand National champion 1964; 1967	Succeeded by Ned Jarrett; David Pearson
Preceded by Bobby Isaac; Benny Parsons; Cale Yarborough	NASCAR Winston Cup champion 1971, 1972; 1974, 1975; 1979	Succeeded by Benny Parsons; Cale Yarborough; Dale Earnhardt
Achievements
Preceded by Tiny Lund; Fred Lorenzen; Pete Hamilton; A.J. Foyt; Bobby Allison; Buddy Baker	Daytona 500 Winner; 1964; 1966; 1971; 1973, 1974; 1979; 1981	Succeeded by Fred Lorenzen; Mario Andretti; A.J. Foyt; Benny Parsons; Buddy Baker; Bobby Allison
Preceded by Darel Dieringer	Southern 500 Winner; 1967	Succeeded by Cale Yarborough
Preceded by David Pearson; David Pearson	World 600 Winner; 1975; 1977	Succeeded by David Pearson; Darrell Waltrip
Awards
Preceded by Shorty Rollins	NASCAR Rookie of the Year; 1959	Succeeded by David Pearson

Party political offices
Preceded by John H. Carrington	Republican nominee for North Carolina Secretary of State; 1996	Succeeded by Harris Blake
