= Plymouth Superbird =

Automobile made by Plymouth Motor Company

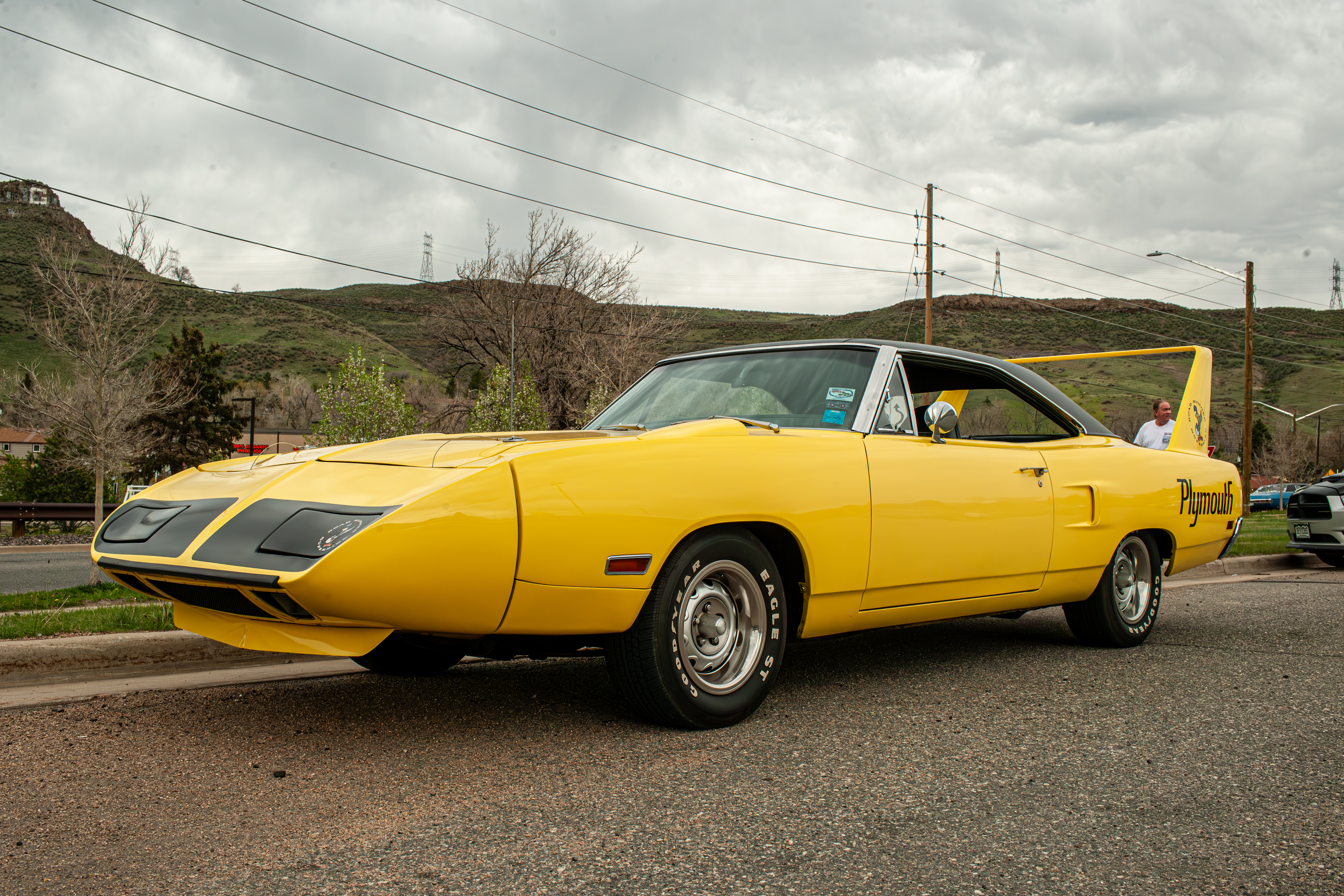

Overview
- Manufacturer: Plymouth (Chrysler)
- Production: 1970
- Assembly: United States: Detroit, Michigan (Lynch Road Assembly)
- Designer: Gary Romberg

Body and chassis
- Class: muscle car, race car
- Body style: 2-door coupe
- Layout: FR layout
- Platform: B-body
- Related: Plymouth Road Runner; Dodge Charger Daytona

Powertrain
- Engine: 426 cu in (7.0 L) Hemi V8; 440 cu in (7.2 L) Super Commando V8
- Transmission: 4-speed manual 3-speed automatic Torqueflite 727

Dimensions
- Wheelbase: 115.8 in (2,941 mm)
- Length: 221 in (5,613 mm)
- Width: 76.4 in (1,941 mm)
- Height: 61.4 in (1,560 mm)
- Curb weight: 3,841 lb (1,742 kg)

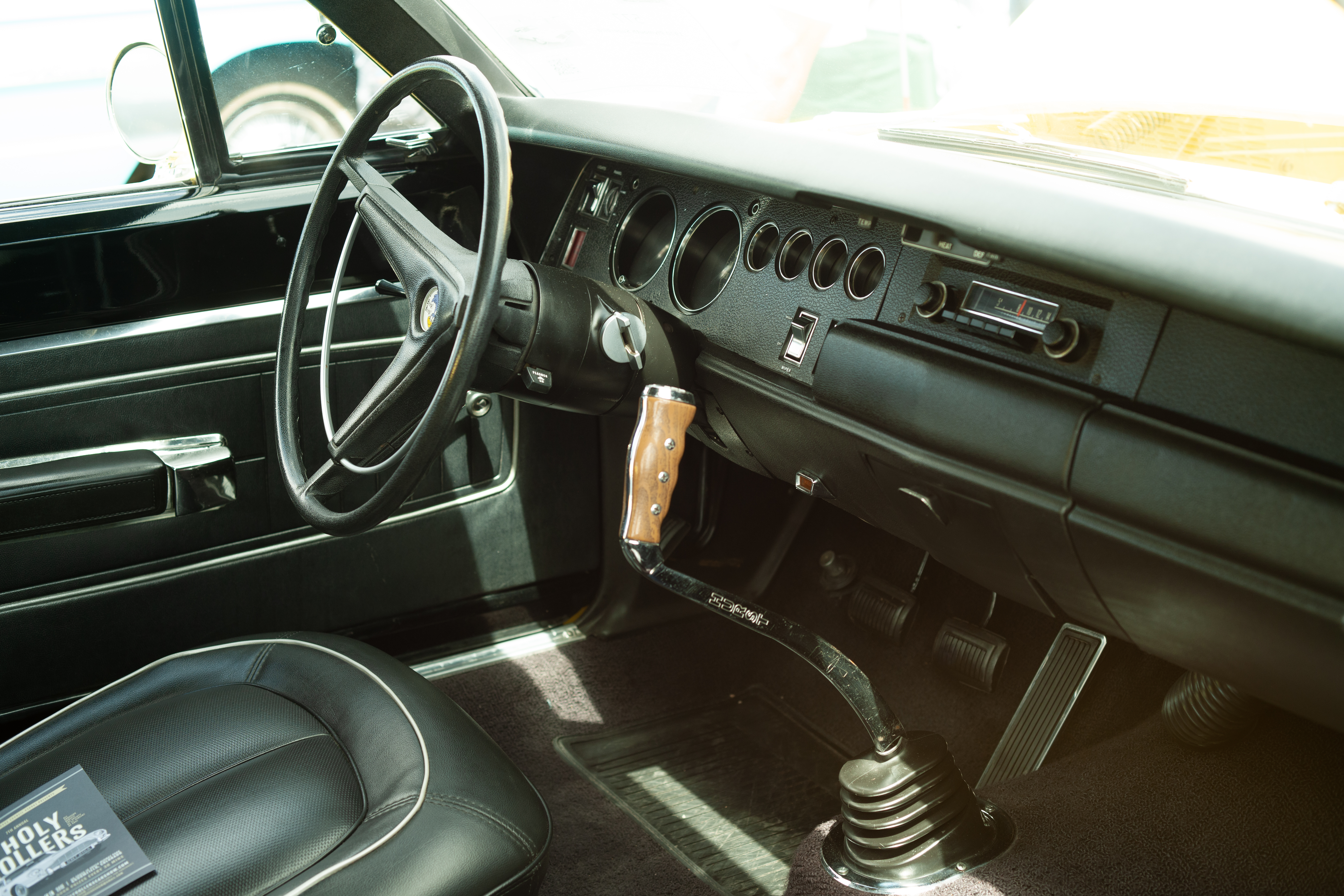
Superbird Interior

The Plymouth Superbird is a highly modified, short-lived version of the Plymouth Road Runner with applied graphic images as well as a distinctive horn sound, both referencing the popular Looney Tunes cartoon character Road Runner. It was the factory's follow-up stock car racing design, for the 1970 season, to the Dodge Charger Daytona of 1969, and incorporated many engineering changes and modifications (both minor and major) garnered from the Daytona's season in competition.

The car's primary rivals were the Ford Torino Talladega and Mercury Cyclone, a direct response to the Mopar aero car. It has also been speculated that a motivating factor in the production of the car was to lure Richard Petty back to Plymouth. Both of the Mopar aero cars famously featured a protruding, aerodynamic nosecone, a high-mounted rear wing and, unique to the Superbird, a horn mimicking the Road Runner's signature "beep, beep."

Superbirds equipped with the top-of-the-line 426 cu in (7.0 L) Hemi engine with a pair of four barrel Carter AFB carburetors (2x4bbl) producing 425 hp (317 kW) could accelerate from 0 to 60 mph (97 km/h) in 5.5 seconds.

== History ==
Developed specifically for NASCAR racing, the Superbird, a modified Road Runner, was Plymouth's follow-on design to the Charger Daytona fielded by sister company Dodge in the previous season. The Dodge Charger 500 that began the 1969 season was designed for aerodynamics using a wind tunnel and computer analysis, and later was modified into the Daytona version with nose and tail. The Superbird's smoothed-out body and nosecone were further refined from that of the Daytona, and the street version's pop-up headlights (made of fiberglass) added nineteen inches to the Road Runner's original length. The rear wing was mounted on tall vertical struts that put it into less disturbed air, which increased the downforce it produced. For nearly 30 years, the mathematical formula used to determine the exact height of the enormous wing was thought to be a highly guarded Chrysler secret. That was until somewhere in the 1990s, when a retired Chrysler project engineer incorrectly claimed publicly that the height was determined in much simpler fashion: he claimed it was designed to provide clearance for the trunk lid to open freely. This is an urban myth. The actual height was set to clear the roofline so it was in clean air. The rear-facing fender scoops were to hide cutouts. On Daytonas, the scoops were actually for ventilating trapped air from the wheel wells to reduce under fender air pressure and lift. For standard road going Superbirds the covers or "air extractors" were a cosmetic enhancement. Ground clearance was 7.2 inches (18 centimetres).

NASCAR's homologation requirement demanded that vehicles to be raced must be available to the general public and sold through dealerships in specific minimum numbers. For 1970, NASCAR raised the production requirement from 500 examples to one for every two manufacturer's dealers in the United States; in the case of Plymouth, that meant having to build 1,920 Superbirds. Due to increasing emissions regulations, combined with insurance spike for high performance cars and NASCAR's effective ban on the aero cars, 1970 was its only production year.

"Road Runner Superbird" decals were placed on the outside edges of the spoiler vertical struts featuring a picture of the Road Runner cartoon character holding a racing helmet. A smaller version of the decal appears on the driver's side headlight door. Superbirds had three engine options: the 426 Hemi V8 engine producing 425 bhp (431 PS; 317 kW) at 5000 rpm and 490 lb⋅ft (664 N⋅m) at 4000 rpm of torque, the 440 Super Commando Six Barrel with 3X2-barrel carburetors producing 390 hp (290 kW) and the 375 hp (280 kW) 440 Super Commando with a single 4-barrel carburetor. Only 135 models were fitted with the 426 Hemi. As the 440 was less expensive to produce, the "street" version of the 426 Hemi engine used in competition was homologated by producing the minimum number required.

On the street, the nose cone and wing were very distinctive, but the aerodynamic improvements hardly made a difference there or on the drag strip. In fact, the 1970 Road Runner was actually quicker in the quarter-mile and standard acceleration tests due to the increased downforce produced by the Superbird's nose and wing. Only at speeds in excess of 60 mph (97 km/h) did the modifications begin to show any benefit.

== Production numbers ==
Chrysler memos of September 1969 show that the sales programming staff were preparing to handle 1,920 Superbirds for 1970, but published figures say as many as 2,783 were built. The current figure generally accepted is 1,935 Superbirds built and shipped to United States dealers, with some 34 to 47 allegedly shipped to Canada. The engine option is also questioned, although the most frequently seen numbers report 135 Hemi Superbirds and 716 440ci. six-barrel editions, with the remainder powered by 440ci. 4bbl. motors. It is believed that over 1,000 Plymouth Superbirds exist today.

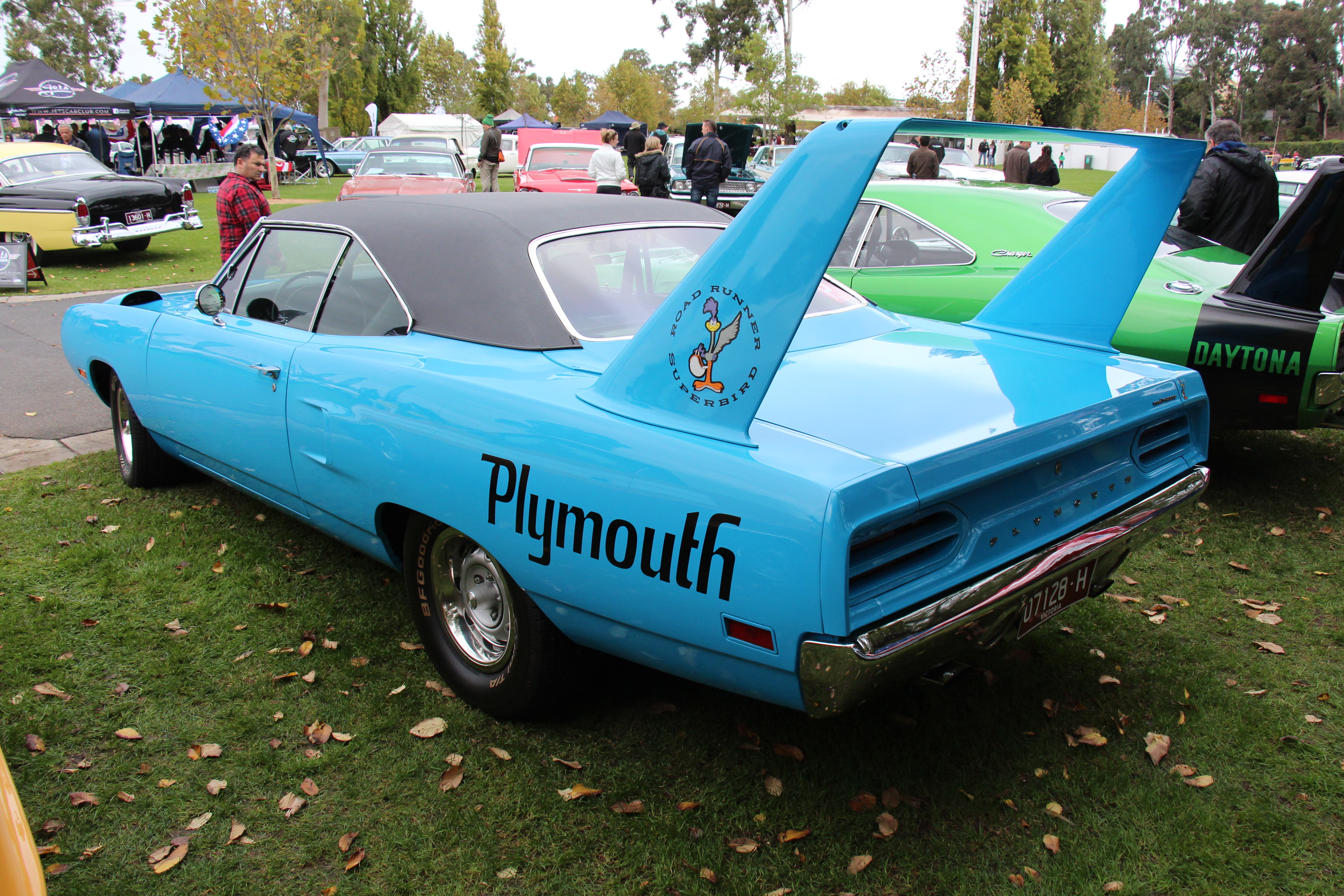
1970 Superbird in Petty Blue

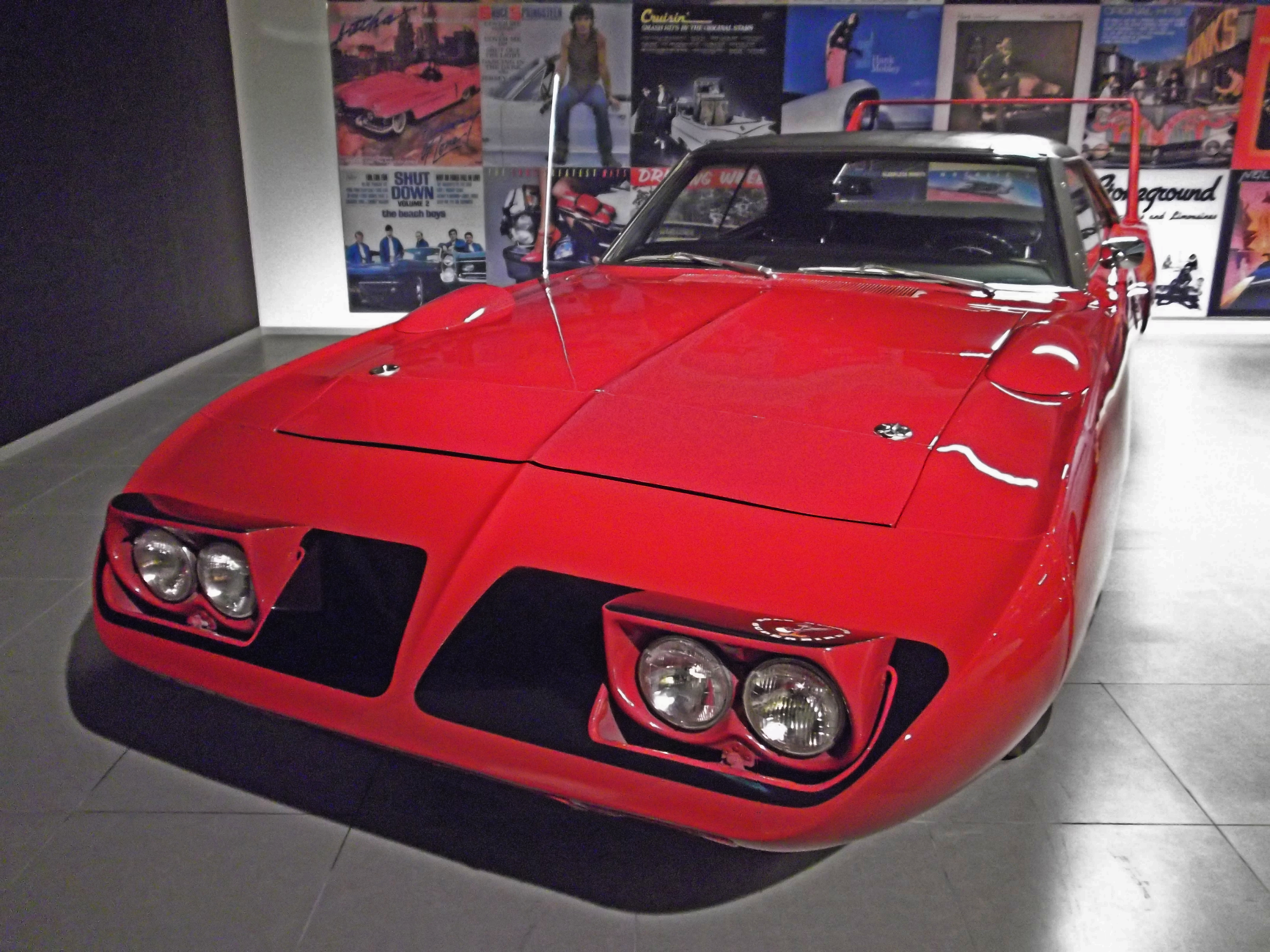
Pop-up headlights raised

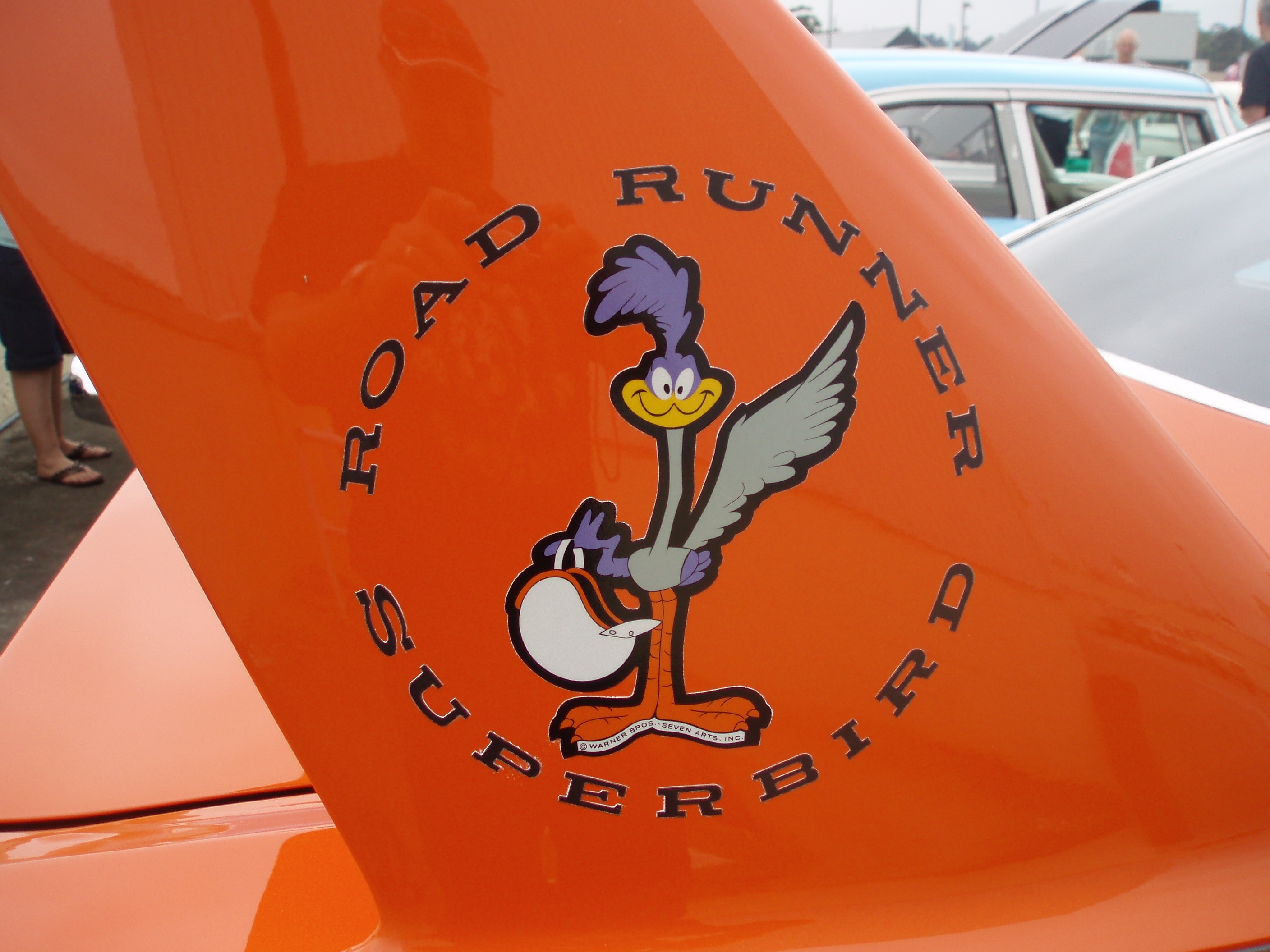
Road Runner decal on the wing

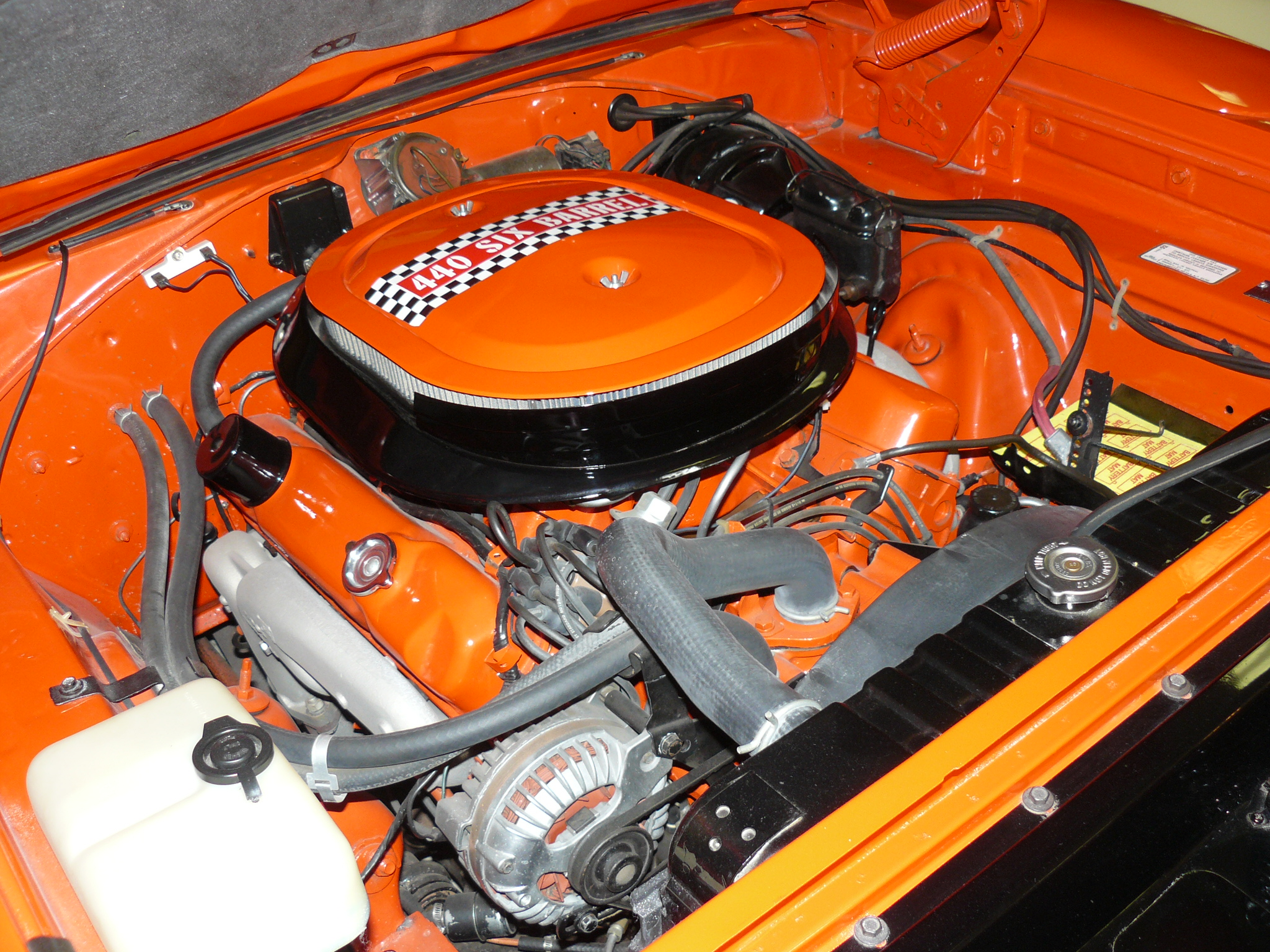
440 Cubic Inch Six Barrel Engine

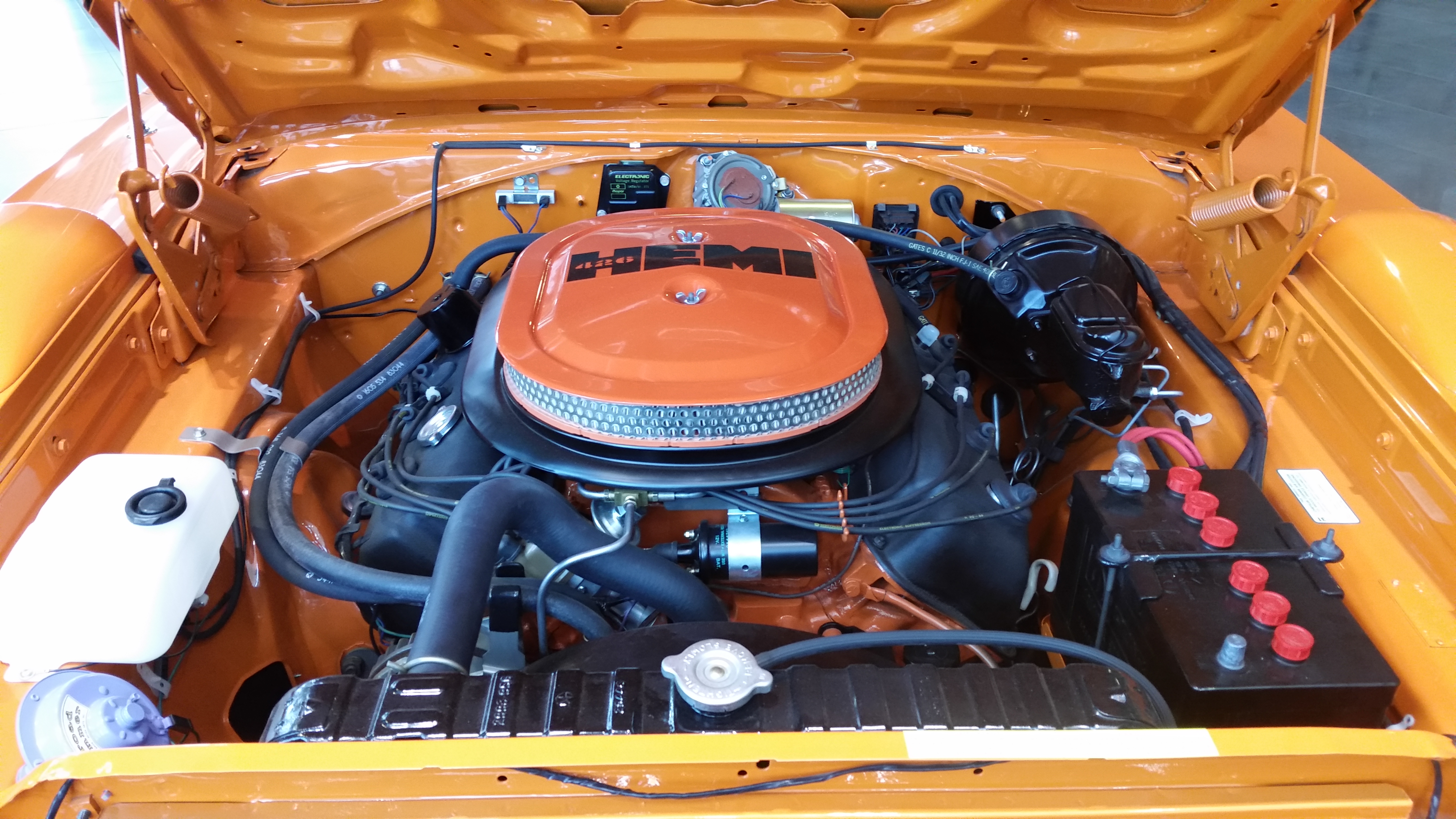
426 Hemi V8 engine

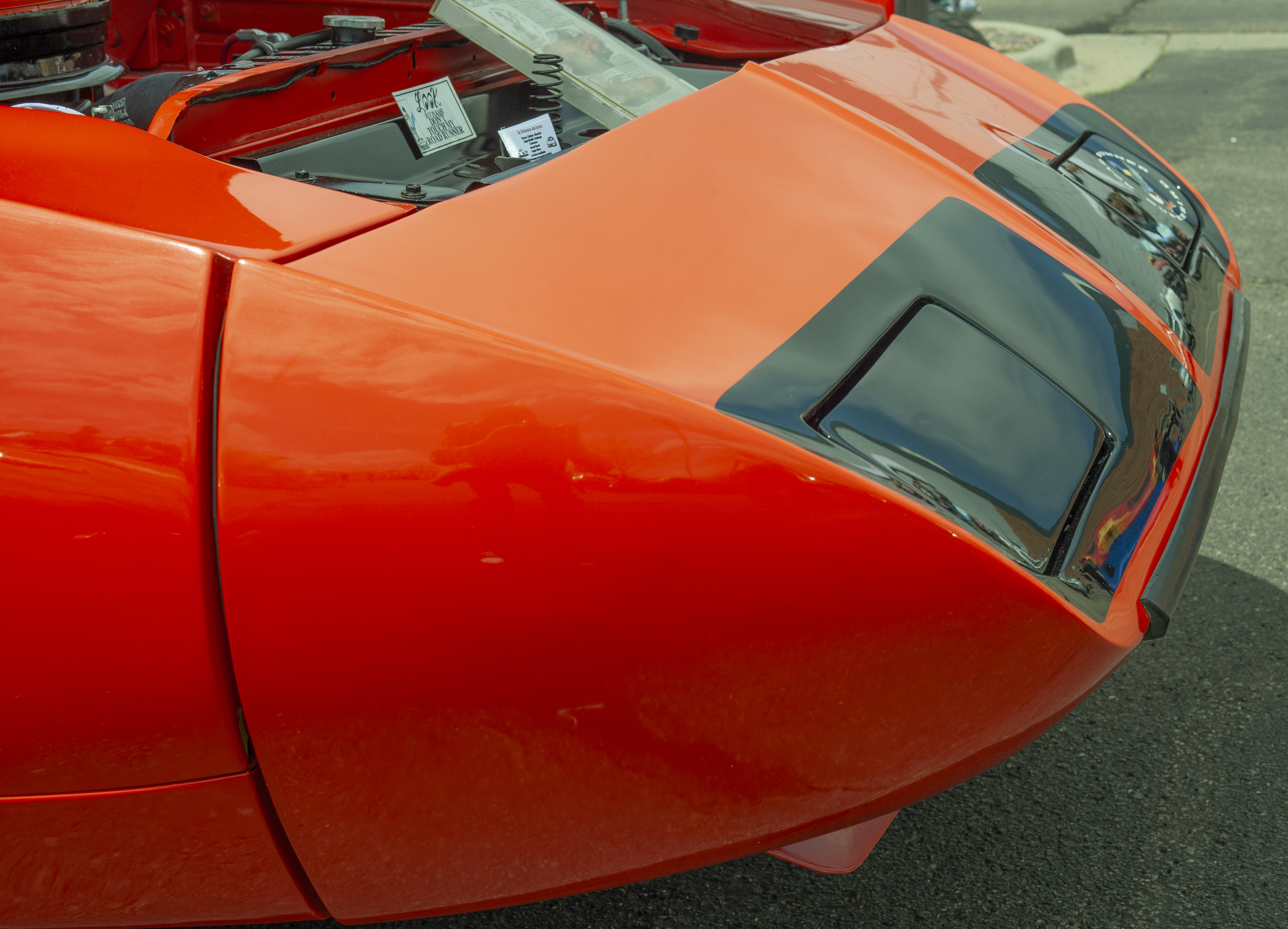
1970 Superbird Nose cone close-up

== NASCAR ==
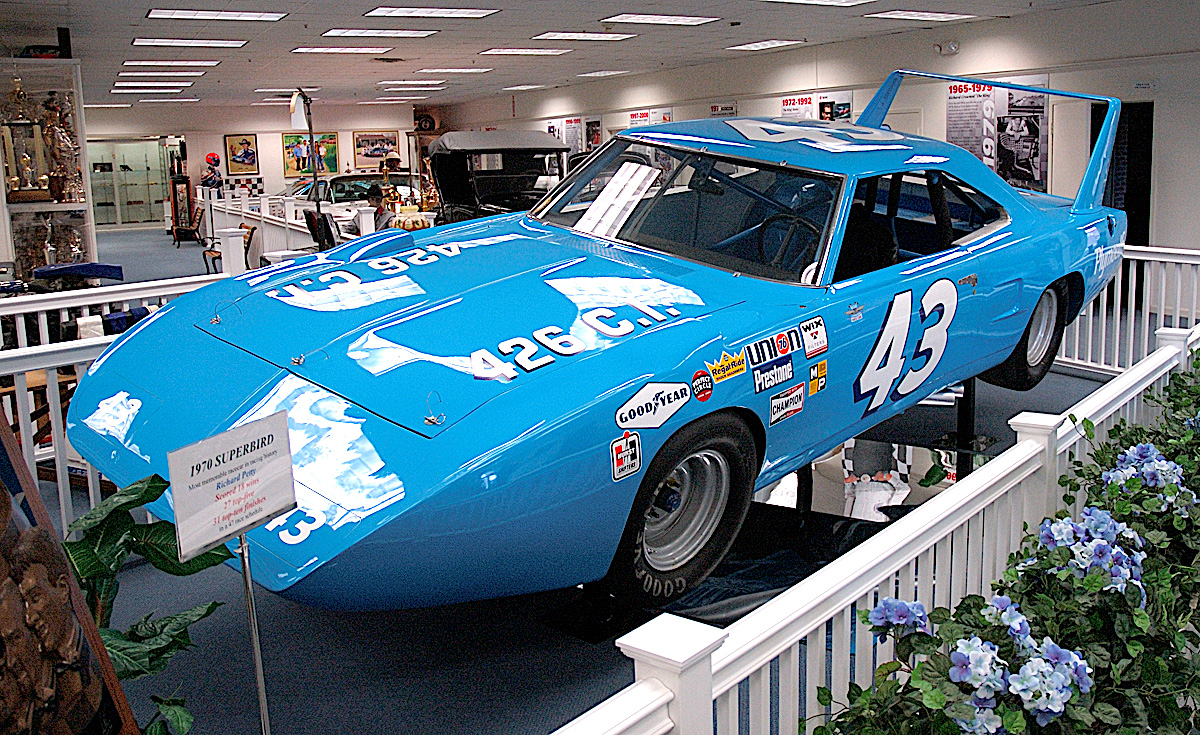
Petty's Road Runner Superbird on display at the Richard Petty Museum

In Autumn 1968, Richard Petty left the Plymouth NASCAR Racing Team for Ford's. Charlie Grey, director of the Ford stock car program, felt that hiring Petty would send the message that "money rules none". However, the Superbird was designed specifically to lure Petty back to Plymouth for the 1970 season. Petty did very well against strong Ford opposition on the NASCAR tracks that year, winning a season-leading 18 of the 40 races he entered (of a 47-race season, counting the Twin 125s as one event), adding 9 other Top 5 finishes and placing fourth in the overall championship – having missed a chance to earn points in the seven races he missed due to an injury suffered at the 1970 Rebel 400.

NASCAR's rules implemented for the 1971 season limited the "aero-cars" to an engine displacement of no greater than 305 cu in (5.00 L) or they had to carry much more weight compared to their competitors. While they were still legal to race, the power-to-weight consequences that would come with the smaller engine or the increased weight rendered the cars uncompetitive. This was the start of a trend of rules slowing down NASCAR, because the races were exceeding the technology of tires and safety over 200 mph (320 km/h). Ford, in response, also designed the 1970 Torino King Cobra with an aerodynamic, Superbird-style nose, but it was abandoned.

Richard Petty's blue #43 Superbird was used as a base for the Cars series character Strip "The King" Weathers, with Petty himself voicing the character in Cars (2006) and Cars 3 (2017).

== Market impact ==
The Superbird's styling proved to be too extreme for 1970s tastes (many customers preferred the regular Road Runner), and as a consequence, many of the 1,920 examples built sat unsold on the back lots of dealerships as late as 1972. Some were converted into 1970 Road Runners to move them off the sales lot. Some manufacturers produce Superbird conversion kits for 1970 Road Runners and Satellites. Kits are also available for unproduced 1971 and 1972 bodies for the Superbird. More recently, they have been very steadily rising in price, regularly fetching from US$200,000 to $450,000. However this does vary based on the engine, gearbox, and other factory options on the car.

The Plymouth Superbird and Dodge Charger Daytona were each built for one model year only (1970 and 1969 respectively.)
