= Richard Petty Museum =

Museum in North Carolina, United States

- Established: 1998
- Location: 311 Branson Mill Road, Randleman, North Carolina
- Coordinates: 35°53′26″N 79°48′03″W
- Founder: Lynda Petty
- Website: richardpettymuseum.com

The Richard Petty Museum, sometimes known as the Petty Museum is dedicated to the Petty family's NASCAR legacy. The museum is located on Branson Mill Rd., in the family's home town of Level Cross, North Carolina. The museum was established in 1998 as a look into the life and career of Richard Petty, and includes items from the family's own collections (including vintage cars), a kids' "pit stop" where children can design their own race cars. Among the vintage cars is a rare Plymouth Superbird.

== Locations ==
The museum was originally located in Level Cross but moved to nearby Randleman, North Carolina in 2003 when Petty Enterprises needed the museum's space. Randleman was chosen as a location as it was the nearest town and also the place where Richard and his wife Lynda went to high school. In 2014, it moved back to its original home near the Petty Garage and Richard Petty's home in March 2014.

The new museum complex includes the "A-Frame Building", the first home of Petty Engineering and the "Lee Petty House", where Richard and his brother Maurice were born. It includes exhibits about all four members of the Petty family who are in the NASCAR Hall of Fame including Lee, Richard, Maurice and Dale Inman. There are plans to further expand the museum to include more on Lee Petty's legacy as well as the "Reaper Shed", the spot where Lee founded Petty Engineering.
