= 1994 GM Goodwrench Dealer 400 =

21st race of the 1994 NASCAR Winston Cup Series

Race details
- Race 21 of 31 in the 1994 NASCAR Winston Cup Series
- The 1994 GM Goodwrench Dealer 400 program cover, featuring Dale Earnhardt.
- Date: August 21, 1994
- Official name: 25th Annual GM Goodwrench Dealer 400
- Location: Cambridge Township, Michigan, Michigan International Speedway
- Course: Permanent racing facility
- Course length: 2 miles (3.2 km)
- Distance: 200 laps, 400 mi (643.737 km)
- Scheduled distance: 200 laps, 400 mi (643.737 km)
- Average speed: 139.914 miles per hour (225.170 km/h)

Pole position
Driver	Geoff Bodine	Geoff Bodine Racing
- Time: 39.761

Most laps led
Driver	Geoff Bodine	Geoff Bodine Racing
- Laps: 160

Winner
No. 7	Geoff Bodine	Geoff Bodine Racing

Television in the United States
- Network: ESPN
- Announcers: Bob Jenkins, Ned Jarrett, Benny Parsons

Radio in the United States
- Radio: Motor Racing Network

The 1994 GM Goodwrench Dealer 400 was the 21st stock car race of the 1994 NASCAR Winston Cup Series season and the 25th iteration of the event. The race was held on Sunday, August 21, 1994, in Cambridge Township, Michigan, at Michigan International Speedway, a two-mile (3.2 km) moderate-banked D-shaped speedway. The race took the scheduled 200 laps to complete. At race's end, Geoff Bodine, driving for his own Geoff Bodine Racing team, would manage to dominate the race to take his 17th career NASCAR Winston Cup Series victory and his second victory of the season. To fill out the top three, Roush Racing driver Mark Martin and Precision Products Racing driver Rick Mast would finish second and third, respectively.

The race weekend was marred when on Saturday, a near-fatal crash involving championship contender Ernie Irvan would occur in the race's first Saturday practice session. Irvan would suffer a basilar skull fracture and a collapsed lung, and it would take over a year for Irvan to get back into the NASCAR Winston Cup Series.

== Background ==
The layout of Michigan International Speedway, the venue where the race was held.

The race was held at Michigan International Speedway, a two-mile (3.2 km) moderate-banked D-shaped speedway located in Cambridge Township, Michigan. The track is used primarily for NASCAR events. It is known as a "sister track" to Texas World Speedway as MIS's oval design was a direct basis of TWS, with moderate modifications to the banking in the corners, and was used as the basis of Auto Club Speedway. The track is owned by NASCAR. Michigan is recognized as one of motorsports' premier facilities because of its wide racing surface and high banking (by open-wheel standards; the 18-degree banking is modest by stock car standards).

=== Entry list ===
- (R) denotes rookie driver.

#	Driver	Team	Make
1	Rick Mast	Precision Products Racing	Ford
2	Rusty Wallace	Penske Racing South	Ford
02	Jeff Purvis	Taylor Racing	Ford
3	Dale Earnhardt	Richard Childress Racing	Chevrolet
4	Sterling Marlin	Morgan–McClure Motorsports	Chevrolet
5	Terry Labonte	Hendrick Motorsports	Chevrolet
6	Mark Martin	Roush Racing	Ford
7	Geoff Bodine	Geoff Bodine Racing	Ford
8	Jeff Burton (R)	Stavola Brothers Racing	Ford
9	Phil Parsons	Melling Racing	Ford
10	Ricky Rudd	Rudd Performance Motorsports	Ford
11	Bill Elliott	Junior Johnson & Associates	Ford
12	Derrike Cope	Bobby Allison Motorsports	Ford
15	Lake Speed	Bud Moore Engineering	Ford
16	Ted Musgrave	Roush Racing	Ford
17	Darrell Waltrip	Darrell Waltrip Motorsports	Chevrolet
18	Dale Jarrett	Joe Gibbs Racing	Chevrolet
19	Loy Allen Jr. (R)	TriStar Motorsports	Ford
21	Morgan Shepherd	Wood Brothers Racing	Ford
22	Bobby Labonte	Bill Davis Racing	Pontiac
23	Hut Stricklin	Travis Carter Enterprises	Ford
24	Jeff Gordon	Hendrick Motorsports	Chevrolet
25	Ken Schrader	Hendrick Motorsports	Chevrolet
26	Brett Bodine	King Racing	Ford
27	Jimmy Spencer	Junior Johnson & Associates	Ford
28	Ernie Irvan*	Robert Yates Racing	Ford
29	Steve Grissom	Diamond Ridge Motorsports	Chevrolet
30	Michael Waltrip	Bahari Racing	Pontiac
31	Ward Burton	A.G. Dillard Motorsports	Chevrolet
32	Dick Trickle	Active Motorsports	Chevrolet
33	Harry Gant	Leo Jackson Motorsports	Chevrolet
34	Bob Brevak	Brevak Racing	Ford
40	Bobby Hamilton	SABCO Racing	Pontiac
41	Joe Nemechek (R)	Larry Hedrick Motorsports	Chevrolet
42	Kyle Petty	SABCO Racing	Pontiac
43	John Andretti (R)	Petty Enterprises	Pontiac
44	Bobby Hillin Jr.	Charles Hardy Racing	Ford
45	Rich Bickle (R)	Terminal Trucking Motorsports	Ford
47	Billy Standridge (R)	Johnson Standridge Racing	Ford
52	Brad Teague	Jimmy Means Racing	Ford
54	Robert Pressley	Leo Jackson Motorsports	Chevrolet
55	Jimmy Hensley	RaDiUs Motorsports	Ford
59	Andy Belmont	Andy Belmont Racing	Ford
61	Rick Carelli	Chesrown Racing	Chevrolet
71	Dave Marcis	Marcis Auto Racing	Chevrolet
75	Todd Bodine	Butch Mock Motorsports	Ford
77	Greg Sacks	U.S. Motorsports Inc.	Ford
82	Laura Lane	Miskotten Racing	Ford
90	Mike Wallace (R)	Donlavey Racing	Ford
98	Jeremy Mayfield (R)	Cale Yarborough Motorsports	Ford

*Withdrew due to injuries sustained in the race weekend's second practice.

== Qualifying ==
Qualifying was split into two rounds. The first round was held on Friday, August 19, at 3:30 PM EST. Each driver would have one lap to set a time. During the first round, the top 20 drivers in the round would be guaranteed a starting spot in the race. If a driver was not able to guarantee a spot in the first round, they had the option to scrub their time from the first round and try and run a faster lap time in a second round qualifying run, held on Saturday, August 20, at 10:30 AM EST. As with the first round, each driver would have one lap to set a time. For this specific race, positions 21-40 would be decided on time, and depending on who needed it, a select amount of positions were given to cars who had not otherwise qualified but were high enough in owner's points; up to two provisionals were given. If needed, a past champion who did not qualify on either time or provisionals could use a champion's provisional, adding one more spot to the field.

Geoff Bodine, driving for his own Geoff Bodine Racing team, won the pole, setting a time of 39.761 and an average speed of 181.082 mph (291.423 km/h) in the first round.

Eight drivers would fail to qualify, in addition to one withdrawn entry.

=== Full qualifying results ===
Pos.	#	Driver	Team	Make	Time	Speed
1	7	Geoff Bodine	Geoff Bodine Racing	Ford	39.761	181.082
2	43	John Andretti (R)	Petty Enterprises	Pontiac	39.770	181.041
3	24	Jeff Gordon	Hendrick Motorsports	Chevrolet	40.012	179.946
4	11	Bill Elliott	Junior Johnson & Associates	Ford	40.012	179.946
5	22	Bobby Labonte	Bill Davis Racing	Pontiac	40.025	179.888
6	41	Joe Nemechek (R)	Larry Hedrick Motorsports	Chevrolet	40.030	179.865
7	2	Rusty Wallace	Penske Racing South	Ford	40.076	179.659
8	75	Todd Bodine	Butch Mock Motorsports	Ford	40.093	179.582
9	1	Rick Mast	Precision Products Racing	Ford	40.105	179.529
10	30	Michael Waltrip	Bahari Racing	Pontiac	40.123	179.448
11	3	Dale Earnhardt	Richard Childress Racing	Chevrolet	40.150	179.328
12	4	Sterling Marlin	Morgan–McClure Motorsports	Chevrolet	40.162	179.274
13	6	Mark Martin	Roush Racing	Ford	40.182	179.185
14	19	Loy Allen Jr. (R)	TriStar Motorsports	Ford	40.194	179.131
15	10	Ricky Rudd	Rudd Performance Motorsports	Ford	40.271	178.789
16	77	Greg Sacks	U.S. Motorsports Inc.	Ford	40.290	178.704
17	5	Terry Labonte	Hendrick Motorsports	Chevrolet	40.291	178.700
18	33	Harry Gant	Leo Jackson Motorsports	Chevrolet	40.291	178.700
19	25	Ken Schrader	Hendrick Motorsports	Chevrolet	40.310	178.656
Failed to lock in Round 1
20	29	Steve Grissom (R)	Diamond Ridge Motorsports	Chevrolet	40.034	179.847
21	26	Brett Bodine	King Racing	Ford	40.132	179.408
22	45	Rich Bickle (R)	Terminal Trucking Motorsports	Ford	40.278	178.758
23	02	Jeff Purvis	Taylor Racing	Ford	40.305	178.638
24	12	Derrike Cope	Bobby Allison Motorsports	Ford	40.373	178.337
25	47	Billy Standridge (R)	Johnson Standridge Racing	Ford	40.396	178.235
26	31	Ward Burton (R)	A.G. Dillard Motorsports	Chevrolet	40.400	178.218
27	90	Mike Wallace (R)	Donlavey Racing	Ford	40.403	178.205
28	8	Jeff Burton (R)	Stavola Brothers Racing	Ford	40.405	178.196
29	15	Lake Speed	Bud Moore Engineering	Ford	40.410	178.174
30	17	Darrell Waltrip	Darrell Waltrip Motorsports	Chevrolet	40.410	178.174
31	18	Dale Jarrett	Joe Gibbs Racing	Chevrolet	40.438	178.050
32	44	Bobby Hillin Jr.	Charles Hardy Racing	Ford	40.439	178.046
33	9	Phil Parsons	Melling Racing	Ford	40.443	178.028
34	32	Dick Trickle	Active Motorsports	Chevrolet	40.446	178.015
35	61	Rick Carelli	Chesrown Racing	Chevrolet	40.481	177.861
36	21	Morgan Shepherd	Wood Brothers Racing	Ford	40.524	177.672
37	71	Dave Marcis	Marcis Auto Racing	Chevrolet	40.545	177.580
38	16	Ted Musgrave	Roush Racing	Ford	40.591	177.379
39	98	Jeremy Mayfield (R)	Cale Yarborough Motorsports	Ford	40.642	177.157
Provisionals
40	42	Kyle Petty	SABCO Racing	Pontiac	-*	-*
41	27	Jimmy Spencer	Junior Johnson & Associates	Ford	-*	-*
Failed to qualify or withdrew
42	40	Bobby Hamilton	SABCO Racing	Pontiac	40.691	176.943
43	23	Hut Stricklin	Travis Carter Enterprises	Ford	40.790	176.514
44	55	Jimmy Hensley	RaDiUs Motorsports	Ford	40.793	176.501
45	54	Robert Pressley	Leo Jackson Motorsports	Chevrolet	40.869	176.173
46	59	Andy Belmont	Andy Belmont Racing	Ford	41.103	175.170
47	82	Laura Lane	Miskotten Racing	Ford	41.387	173.968
48	52	Brad Teague	Jimmy Means Racing	Ford	41.847	172.055
49	34	Bob Brevak	Brevak Racing	Ford	-	-
WD	28	Ernie Irvan	Robert Yates Racing	Ford	40.295	178.682
Official first round qualifying results
Official starting lineup

== Ernie Irvan practice crash ==
At around 8:40 AM EST, nearing the end of the first practice session that occurred on Saturday, Robert Yates Racing driver Ernie Irvan was told to go for a practice run of 10 laps. The weather was extremely foggy and hazy according to Irvan's crew chief Larry McReynolds. In an interview for a documentary, McReynolds would say that Irvan would have a tendency to run a couple extra laps in order to "feel the car out". Irvan had completed his 10 lap run when he decided to run one more lap, as McReynolds had anticipated. According to the driver behind Irvan, Ted Musgrave, when Irvan exited the second turn of the track, Irvan's car would suffer a right front tire failure at around 170 miles per hour (270 km/h). Musgrave would then say that Irvan tried to lock the brakes up in vain, as the car careened towards the outside wall. In another report by Ricky Rudd's crew chief, Bill Ingle, he had seen Irvan's car slip onto its left side before flipping back onto all four wheels and stopping.

When first responders had arrived at the crash scene, they saw Irvan's mouth filled and spilling with blood, along with his nose also spilling blood; with this, his brain could not get enough oxygen in order to live. The doctor at the scene, Dr. John Maino, ordered an emergency tracheotomy to be performed on Irvan while he was in the car. The kit Maino had was missing his surgical knife, so he used a pocket knife in order to perform the tracheotomy, which was successful. After inserting a tube to let air into Irvan's system, he was airlifted to the St. Joseph Mercy Hospital in Ypsilanti, Michigan where the doctor at the hospital, Dr. Errol Erlandson had reported that Irvan had suffered "severe major injuries in two organ areas, either of which could be fatal." Erlandson would report that Irvan had suffered a skull fracture along with bruised lungs that had filled with fluid. According to Ernie's wife, Kim, the doctor gave a 10-15% chance of survival to live through the night. He would manage to make it through the night, but was unconscious for the next two days in critical condition. On Monday, his medication was reduced when he would regain some consciousness, with Irvan being able to move all of his extremities; but he was still in critical condition. After around a month of recovery, Erlandson had reported that the condition of Irvan had been upgraded to "good", with his lungs back to normal and his brain recovering fast in a "miraculous" recovery. With this report, Irvan was allowed to head back to his home in Charlotte, North Carolina and enter the Charlotte Institute of Rehabilitation for further recovery.

One week later, Irvan would make his first public appearance, making a news conference. In the conference, Irvan stated that he had hopes of returning to racing at the 1995 Daytona 500, and stated that his rehabilitation had been going well. While he would not be featured on the entry list for that year's Daytona 500, he would eventually be cleared to race on September 5, and would eventually race his first NASCAR Winston Cup Series race in the 1995 Tyson Holly Farms 400.

== Race results ==
Fin	St	#	Driver	Team	Make	Laps	Led	Status	Pts	Winnings
1	1	7	Geoff Bodine	Geoff Bodine Racing	Ford	200	160	running	185	$89,595
2	13	6	Mark Martin	Roush Racing	Ford	200	4	running	175	$50,320
3	9	1	Rick Mast	Precision Products Racing	Ford	200	7	running	170	$38,320
4	7	2	Rusty Wallace	Penske Racing South	Ford	200	2	running	165	$34,070
5	5	22	Bobby Labonte	Bill Davis Racing	Pontiac	200	0	running	155	$28,415
6	40	42	Kyle Petty	SABCO Racing	Pontiac	200	0	running	150	$36,690
7	4	11	Bill Elliott	Junior Johnson & Associates	Ford	199	13	running	151	$23,015
8	17	5	Terry Labonte	Hendrick Motorsports	Chevrolet	199	0	running	142	$24,640
9	30	17	Darrell Waltrip	Darrell Waltrip Motorsports	Chevrolet	199	1	running	143	$21,190
10	15	10	Ricky Rudd	Rudd Performance Motorsports	Ford	199	0	running	134	$17,940
11	19	25	Ken Schrader	Hendrick Motorsports	Chevrolet	199	0	running	130	$17,690
12	21	26	Brett Bodine	King Racing	Ford	199	0	running	127	$17,190
13	29	15	Lake Speed	Bud Moore Engineering	Ford	199	0	running	124	$21,790
14	10	30	Michael Waltrip	Bahari Racing	Pontiac	199	0	running	121	$18,190
15	3	24	Jeff Gordon	Hendrick Motorsports	Chevrolet	198	8	engine	123	$21,565
16	27	90	Mike Wallace (R)	Donlavey Racing	Ford	198	0	running	115	$14,240
17	2	43	John Andretti (R)	Petty Enterprises	Pontiac	198	0	running	112	$13,690
18	24	12	Derrike Cope	Bobby Allison Motorsports	Ford	197	0	running	109	$16,590
19	20	29	Steve Grissom (R)	Diamond Ridge Motorsports	Chevrolet	197	0	running	106	$11,815
20	41	27	Jimmy Spencer	Junior Johnson & Associates	Ford	197	5	running	108	$12,640
21	6	41	Joe Nemechek (R)	Larry Hedrick Motorsports	Chevrolet	196	0	running	100	$11,665
22	14	19	Loy Allen Jr. (R)	TriStar Motorsports	Ford	196	0	running	97	$9,365
23	39	98	Jeremy Mayfield (R)	Cale Yarborough Motorsports	Ford	196	0	running	94	$11,365
24	38	16	Ted Musgrave	Roush Racing	Ford	189	0	running	91	$15,165
25	18	33	Harry Gant	Leo Jackson Motorsports	Chevrolet	179	0	engine	88	$15,015
26	36	21	Morgan Shepherd	Wood Brothers Racing	Ford	168	0	running	85	$18,815
27	35	61	Rick Carelli	Chesrown Racing	Chevrolet	162	0	wheel bearing	82	$8,765
28	23	02	Jeff Purvis	Taylor Racing	Ford	139	0	engine	79	$8,715
29	26	31	Ward Burton (R)	A.G. Dillard Motorsports	Chevrolet	133	0	running	76	$8,615
30	31	18	Dale Jarrett	Joe Gibbs Racing	Chevrolet	133	0	running	73	$19,965
31	33	9	Phil Parsons	Melling Racing	Ford	132	0	running	70	$8,415
32	16	77	Greg Sacks	U.S. Motorsports Inc.	Ford	126	0	engine	67	$9,865
33	28	8	Jeff Burton (R)	Stavola Brothers Racing	Ford	121	0	running	64	$12,315
34	12	4	Sterling Marlin	Morgan–McClure Motorsports	Chevrolet	112	0	engine	61	$18,265
35	22	45	Rich Bickle (R)	Terminal Trucking Motorsports	Ford	106	0	engine	58	$8,215
36	37	71	Dave Marcis	Marcis Auto Racing	Chevrolet	76	0	engine	55	$8,190
37	11	3	Dale Earnhardt	Richard Childress Racing	Chevrolet	54	0	crash	52	$22,915
38	8	75	Todd Bodine	Butch Mock Motorsports	Ford	54	0	running	49	$8,140
39	25	47	Billy Standridge (R)	Johnson Standridge Racing	Ford	0	0	crash	46	$8,115
40	32	44	Bobby Hillin Jr.	Charles Hardy Racing	Ford	0	0	crash	43	$8,065
41	34	32	Dick Trickle	Active Motorsports	Chevrolet	0	0	crash	40	$8,565
Official race results

== Standings after the race ==
Drivers' Championship standings

	Pos	Driver	Points
	1	Dale Earnhardt	3,105
	2	Ernie Irvan	3,026 (-79)
1	3	Mark Martin	2,899 (-206)
1	4	Rusty Wallace	2,892 (–213)
	5	Ken Schrader	2,818 (–287)
	6	Ricky Rudd	2,763 (–342)
	7	Morgan Shepherd	2,682 (–423)
	8	Jeff Gordon	2,524 (–581)
	9	Michael Waltrip	2,518 (–587)
	10	Lake Speed	2,467 (–638)
Official driver's standings

- Note: Only the first 10 positions are included for the driver standings.

Previous race: 1994 The Bud at The Glen	NASCAR Winston Cup Series; 1994 season	Next race: 1994 Goody's 500 (Bristol)
