= 1994 Goody's 500 (Bristol) =

22nd race of the 1994 NASCAR Winston Cup Series

Race details
- Race 22 of 31 in the 1994 NASCAR Winston Cup Series
- The 1994 Goody's 500 program cover, featuring Mark Martin.
- Date: August 27, 1994
- Official name: 34th Annual Goody's 500
- Location: Bristol, Tennessee, Bristol Motor Speedway
- Course: Permanent racing facility
- Course length: 0.533 miles (0.858 km)
- Distance: 500 laps, 266.5 mi (428.89 km)
- Scheduled distance: 500 laps, 266.5 mi (428.89 km)
- Average speed: 91.363 miles per hour (147.034 km/h)

Pole position
Driver	Harry Gant	Leo Jackson Motorsports
- Time: 15.451

Most laps led
Driver	Geoff Bodine	Geoff Bodine Racing
- Laps: 168

Winner
No. 2	Rusty Wallace	Penske Racing South

Television in the United States
- Network: ESPN
- Announcers: Bob Jenkins, Ned Jarrett, Benny Parsons

Radio in the United States
- Radio: Performance Racing Network

The 1994 Goody's 500 was the 22nd stock car race of the 1994 NASCAR Winston Cup Series season and the 34th iteration of the event. The race was held on Saturday, August 24, 1994, in Bristol, Tennessee at Bristol Motor Speedway, a 0.533 miles (0.858 km) permanent oval-shaped racetrack. The race took the scheduled 500 laps to complete. In the final 36 laps of the race, Penske Racing South driver Rusty Wallace was able to fend off Roush Racing driver Mark Martin to claim his 37th career NASCAR Winston Cup Series victory and his sixth victory of the season. To fill out the top three, the aforementioned Mark Martin and Richard Childress Racing driver Dale Earnhardt would finish second and third, respectively.

== Background ==
The layout of Bristol Motor Speedway, the venue where the race was held.

The Bristol Motor Speedway, formerly known as Bristol International Raceway and Bristol Raceway, is a NASCAR short track venue located in Bristol, Tennessee. Constructed in 1960, it held its first NASCAR race on July 30, 1961. Despite its short length, Bristol is among the most popular tracks on the NASCAR schedule because of its distinct features, which include extraordinarily steep banking, an all concrete surface, two pit roads, and stadium-like seating. It has also been named one of the loudest NASCAR tracks.

=== Entry list ===
- (R) denotes rookie driver.

#	Driver	Team	Make
1	Rick Mast	Precision Products Racing	Ford
2	Rusty Wallace	Penske Racing South	Ford
3	Dale Earnhardt	Richard Childress Racing	Chevrolet
4	Sterling Marlin	Morgan–McClure Motorsports	Chevrolet
5	Terry Labonte	Hendrick Motorsports	Chevrolet
6	Mark Martin	Roush Racing	Ford
7	Geoff Bodine	Geoff Bodine Racing	Ford
8	Jeff Burton (R)	Stavola Brothers Racing	Ford
10	Ricky Rudd	Rudd Performance Motorsports	Ford
11	Bill Elliott	Junior Johnson & Associates	Ford
12	Derrike Cope	Bobby Allison Motorsports	Ford
14	Phil Parsons	Hagan Racing	Chevrolet
15	Lake Speed	Bud Moore Engineering	Ford
16	Ted Musgrave	Roush Racing	Ford
17	Darrell Waltrip	Darrell Waltrip Motorsports	Chevrolet
18	Dale Jarrett	Joe Gibbs Racing	Chevrolet
19	Loy Allen Jr. (R)	TriStar Motorsports	Ford
21	Morgan Shepherd	Wood Brothers Racing	Ford
22	Bobby Labonte	Bill Davis Racing	Pontiac
23	Hut Stricklin	Travis Carter Enterprises	Ford
24	Jeff Gordon	Hendrick Motorsports	Chevrolet
25	Ken Schrader	Hendrick Motorsports	Chevrolet
26	Brett Bodine	King Racing	Ford
27	Jimmy Spencer	Junior Johnson & Associates	Ford
28	Kenny Wallace	Robert Yates Racing	Ford
29	Steve Grissom	Diamond Ridge Motorsports	Chevrolet
30	Michael Waltrip	Bahari Racing	Pontiac
31	Ward Burton	A.G. Dillard Motorsports	Chevrolet
32	Dick Trickle	Active Motorsports	Chevrolet
33	Harry Gant	Leo Jackson Motorsports	Chevrolet
40	Bobby Hamilton	SABCO Racing	Pontiac
41	Joe Nemechek (R)	Larry Hedrick Motorsports	Chevrolet
42	Kyle Petty	SABCO Racing	Pontiac
43	John Andretti (R)	Petty Enterprises	Pontiac
52	Brad Teague	Jimmy Means Racing	Ford
55	Jimmy Hensley	RaDiUs Motorsports	Ford
71	Dave Marcis	Marcis Auto Racing	Chevrolet
75	Todd Bodine	Butch Mock Motorsports	Ford
77	Greg Sacks	U.S. Motorsports Inc.	Ford
90	Mike Wallace (R)	Donlavey Racing	Ford
95	Jeff Green	Sadler Brothers Racing	Ford
98	Jeremy Mayfield (R)	Cale Yarborough Motorsports	Ford

== Qualifying ==
Qualifying was split into two rounds. The first round was held on Friday, August 26, at 4:30 PM EST. Each driver would have one lap to set a time. During the first round, the top 20 drivers in the round would be guaranteed a starting spot in the race. If a driver was not able to guarantee a spot in the first round, they had the option to scrub their time from the first round and try and run a faster lap time in a second round qualifying run, held on Saturday, August 27, at 1:00 PM EST. As with the first round, each driver would have one lap to set a time. For this specific race, positions 21-34 would be decided on time, and depending on who needed it, a select amount of positions were given to cars who had not otherwise qualified but were high enough in owner's points; up to two provisionals were given. If needed, a past champion who did not qualify on either time or provisionals could use a champion's provisional, adding one more spot to the field.

Harry Gant, driving for Leo Jackson Motorsports, won the pole, setting a time of 15.451 and an average speed of 124.186 mph (199.858 km/h) in the first round.

Six drivers would fail to qualify.

=== Full qualifying results ===
Pos.	#	Driver	Team	Make	Time	Speed
1	33	Harry Gant	Leo Jackson Motorsports	Chevrolet	15.451	124.186
2	7	Geoff Bodine	Geoff Bodine Racing	Ford	15.469	124.042
3	5	Terry Labonte	Hendrick Motorsports	Chevrolet	15.478	123.970
4	2	Rusty Wallace	Penske Racing South	Ford	15.523	123.610
5	41	Joe Nemechek (R)	Larry Hedrick Motorsports	Chevrolet	15.538	123.491
6	32	Dick Trickle	Active Motorsports	Chevrolet	15.570	123.237
7	31	Ward Burton (R)	A.G. Dillard Motorsports	Chevrolet	15.572	123.221
8	6	Mark Martin	Roush Racing	Ford	15.578	123.174
9	1	Rick Mast	Precision Products Racing	Ford	15.581	123.150
10	22	Bobby Labonte	Bill Davis Racing	Pontiac	15.588	123.095
11	11	Bill Elliott	Junior Johnson & Associates	Ford	15.613	122.898
12	24	Jeff Gordon	Hendrick Motorsports	Chevrolet	15.619	122.850
13	77	Greg Sacks	U.S. Motorsports Inc.	Ford	15.626	122.795
14	3	Dale Earnhardt	Richard Childress Racing	Chevrolet	15.638	122.701
15	28	Kenny Wallace	Robert Yates Racing	Ford	15.638	122.701
16	17	Darrell Waltrip	Darrell Waltrip Motorsports	Chevrolet	15.640	122.685
17	40	Bobby Hamilton	SABCO Racing	Pontiac	15.670	122.451
18	16	Ted Musgrave	Roush Racing	Ford	15.675	122.411
19	12	Derrike Cope	Bobby Allison Motorsports	Ford	15.682	122.357
20	8	Jeff Burton (R)	Stavola Brothers Racing	Ford	15.686	122.326
Failed to lock in Round 1
21	21	Morgan Shepherd	Wood Brothers Racing	Ford	15.690	122.294
22	26	Brett Bodine	King Racing	Ford	15.712	122.123
23	43	John Andretti (R)	Petty Enterprises	Pontiac	15.712	122.123
24	4	Sterling Marlin	Morgan–McClure Motorsports	Chevrolet	15.724	122.030
25	98	Jeremy Mayfield (R)	Cale Yarborough Motorsports	Ford	15.737	121.929
26	23	Hut Stricklin	Travis Carter Enterprises	Ford	15.742	121.890
27	90	Mike Wallace (R)	Donlavey Racing	Ford	15.743	121.883
28	30	Michael Waltrip	Bahari Racing	Pontiac	15.769	121.682
29	18	Dale Jarrett	Joe Gibbs Racing	Chevrolet	15.793	121.497
30	29	Steve Grissom (R)	Diamond Ridge Motorsports	Chevrolet	15.797	121.466
31	25	Ken Schrader	Hendrick Motorsports	Chevrolet	15.807	121.389
32	42	Kyle Petty	SABCO Racing	Pontiac	15.838	121.152
33	10	Ricky Rudd	Rudd Performance Motorsports	Ford	15.858	120.999
34	52	Brad Teague	Jimmy Means Racing	Ford	15.866	120.938
Provisionals
35	15	Lake Speed	Bud Moore Engineering	Ford	-*	-*
36	75	Todd Bodine	Butch Mock Motorsports	Ford	-*	-*
Failed to qualify
37	95	Jeff Green	Sadler Brothers Racing	Ford	-*	-*
38	27	Jimmy Spencer	Junior Johnson & Associates	Ford	-*	-*
39	71	Dave Marcis	Marcis Auto Racing	Chevrolet	-*	-*
40	19	Loy Allen Jr. (R)	TriStar Motorsports	Ford	-*	-*
41	55	Jimmy Hensley	RaDiUs Motorsports	Ford	-*	-*
42	14	Phil Parsons	Hagan Racing	Chevrolet	-*	-*
Official first round qualifying results
Official starting lineup

== Race results ==
Fin	St	#	Driver	Team	Make	Laps	Led	Status	Pts	Winnings
1	4	2	Rusty Wallace	Penske Racing South	Ford	500	105	running	180	$53,015
2	8	6	Mark Martin	Roush Racing	Ford	500	42	running	175	$35,915
3	14	3	Dale Earnhardt	Richard Childress Racing	Chevrolet	500	25	running	170	$33,265
4	16	17	Darrell Waltrip	Darrell Waltrip Motorsports	Chevrolet	500	0	running	160	$28,730
5	11	11	Bill Elliott	Junior Johnson & Associates	Ford	500	0	running	155	$22,275
6	24	4	Sterling Marlin	Morgan–McClure Motorsports	Chevrolet	500	0	running	150	$21,265
7	28	30	Michael Waltrip	Bahari Racing	Pontiac	500	2	running	151	$17,965
8	36	75	Todd Bodine	Butch Mock Motorsports	Ford	500	0	running	142	$15,465
9	1	33	Harry Gant	Leo Jackson Motorsports	Chevrolet	499	88	running	143	$23,540
10	9	1	Rick Mast	Precision Products Racing	Ford	499	0	running	134	$19,040
11	18	16	Ted Musgrave	Roush Racing	Ford	499	0	running	130	$16,340
12	33	10	Ricky Rudd	Rudd Performance Motorsports	Ford	499	0	running	127	$16,540
13	15	28	Kenny Wallace	Robert Yates Racing	Ford	499	1	running	129	$20,490
14	22	26	Brett Bodine	King Racing	Ford	497	0	running	121	$15,540
15	32	42	Kyle Petty	SABCO Racing	Pontiac	497	0	running	118	$19,935
16	19	12	Derrike Cope	Bobby Allison Motorsports	Ford	496	0	running	115	$15,085
17	6	32	Dick Trickle	Active Motorsports	Chevrolet	496	0	running	112	$10,935
18	21	21	Morgan Shepherd	Wood Brothers Racing	Ford	495	0	running	109	$18,285
19	31	25	Ken Schrader	Hendrick Motorsports	Chevrolet	494	0	running	106	$14,775
20	20	8	Jeff Burton (R)	Stavola Brothers Racing	Ford	490	0	running	103	$16,285
21	25	98	Jeremy Mayfield (R)	Cale Yarborough Motorsports	Ford	486	0	running	100	$10,935
22	34	52	Brad Teague	Jimmy Means Racing	Ford	478	0	running	97	$8,085
23	2	7	Geoff Bodine	Geoff Bodine Racing	Ford	456	168	engine	104	$17,235
24	27	90	Mike Wallace (R)	Donlavey Racing	Ford	455	0	running	91	$10,060
25	35	15	Lake Speed	Bud Moore Engineering	Ford	409	0	crash	88	$17,915
26	29	18	Dale Jarrett	Joe Gibbs Racing	Chevrolet	388	19	crash	90	$19,285
27	13	77	Greg Sacks	U.S. Motorsports Inc.	Ford	373	0	rear end	82	$9,862
28	17	40	Bobby Hamilton	SABCO Racing	Pontiac	298	0	crash	79	$13,810
29	5	41	Joe Nemechek (R)	Larry Hedrick Motorsports	Chevrolet	286	14	crash	81	$9,285
30	23	43	John Andretti (R)	Petty Enterprises	Pontiac	261	0	crash	73	$7,735
31	10	22	Bobby Labonte	Bill Davis Racing	Pontiac	258	0	crash	70	$11,735
32	12	24	Jeff Gordon	Hendrick Motorsports	Chevrolet	222	36	crash	72	$17,735
33	3	5	Terry Labonte	Hendrick Motorsports	Chevrolet	115	0	crash	64	$18,035
34	30	29	Steve Grissom (R)	Diamond Ridge Motorsports	Chevrolet	108	0	overheating	61	$7,735
35	26	23	Hut Stricklin	Travis Carter Enterprises	Ford	86	0	crash	58	$7,735
36	7	31	Ward Burton (R)	A.G. Dillard Motorsports	Chevrolet	49	0	engine	55	$7,735
Official race results

== Standings after the race ==
Drivers' Championship standings

	Pos	Driver	Points
	1	Dale Earnhardt	3,275
1	2	Mark Martin	3,074 (-201)
1	3	Rusty Wallace	3,072 (-203)
2	4	Ernie Irvan	3,026 (–249)
	5	Ken Schrader	2,924 (–351)
	6	Ricky Rudd	2,890 (–385)
	7	Morgan Shepherd	2,791 (–484)
	8	Jeff Gordon	2,669 (–606)
	9	Michael Waltrip	2,596 (–679)
1	10	Bill Elliott	2,589 (–686)
Official driver's standings

- Note: Only the first 10 positions are included for the driver standings.

Previous race: 1994 GM Goodwrench Dealer 400	NASCAR Winston Cup Series; 1994 season	Next race: 1994 Mountain Dew Southern 500
