= 1995 Tyson Holly Farms 400 =

27th race of the 1995 NASCAR Winston Cup Series

Race details
- Race 27 of 31 in the 1995 NASCAR Winston Cup Series
- The 1995 Tyson Holly Farms 400 program cover, featuring Enoch Staley.
- Date: October 1, 1995
- Official name: 46th Annual First Union 400
- Location: North Wilkesboro Speedway, North Wilkesboro, North Carolina
- Course: Permanent racing facility
- Course length: 0.625 miles (1.006 km)
- Distance: 400 laps, 250 mi (402.336 km)
- Scheduled distance: 400 laps, 250 mi (402.336 km)
- Average speed: 102.998 miles per hour (165.759 km/h)

Pole position
Driver	Ted Musgrave	Roush Racing
- Time: 19.004

Most laps led
Driver	Mark Martin	Roush Racing
- Laps: 126

Winner
No. 6	Mark Martin	Roush Racing

Television in the United States
- Network: ESPN
- Announcers: Bob Jenkins, Ned Jarrett, Benny Parsons

Radio in the United States
- Radio: Motor Racing Network

The 1995 Tyson Holly Farms 400 was the 27th stock car race of the 1995 NASCAR Winston Cup Series and the 46th iteration of the event. The race was held on Sunday, October 1, 1995, in North Wilkesboro, North Carolina at the North Wilkesboro Speedway, a 0.625 miles (1.006 km) oval short track. The race took the scheduled 400 laps to complete. At race's end, Roush Racing driver Mark Martin would manage to dominate the late stages of the race to take his 17th career NASCAR Winston Cup Series victory and his third victory of the season. To fill out the top three, Penske Racing South driver Rusty Wallace and Hendrick Motorsports driver Jeff Gordon would finish second and third, respectively.

After a 36-race absence, the race marked the NASCAR Winston Cup Series return for Ernie Irvan, who had suffered major head and lung injuries in a practice session at the 1994 GM Goodwrench Dealer 400. Irvan would finish sixth in the race.

== Background ==
The layout of North Wilkesboro Speedway, the venue where the race was held.

North Wilkesboro Speedway is a short oval racetrack located on U.S. Route 421, about five miles east of the town of North Wilkesboro, North Carolina, or 80 miles north of Charlotte. It measures 0.625 mi (1.006 km) and features a unique uphill backstretch and downhill frontstretch. It has previously held races in NASCAR's top three series, including 93 Winston Cup Series races. The track, a NASCAR original, operated from 1949, NASCAR's inception, until the track's original closure in 1996. The speedway briefly reopened in 2010 and hosted several stock car series races before closing again in the spring of 2011. It was re-opened in August 2022 for grassroots racing.

=== Entry list ===
- (R) denotes rookie driver.

#	Driver	Team	Make
1	Rick Mast	Precision Products Racing	Pontiac
2	Rusty Wallace	Penske Racing South	Ford
3	Dale Earnhardt	Richard Childress Racing	Chevrolet
4	Sterling Marlin	Morgan–McClure Motorsports	Chevrolet
5	Terry Labonte	Hendrick Motorsports	Chevrolet
6	Mark Martin	Roush Racing	Ford
7	Geoff Bodine	Geoff Bodine Racing	Ford
8	Jeff Burton	Stavola Brothers Racing	Ford
9	Lake Speed	Melling Racing	Ford
10	Ricky Rudd	Rudd Performance Motorsports	Ford
11	Brett Bodine	Junior Johnson & Associates	Ford
12	Derrike Cope	Bobby Allison Motorsports	Ford
15	Dick Trickle	Bud Moore Engineering	Ford
16	Ted Musgrave	Roush Racing	Ford
17	Darrell Waltrip	Darrell Waltrip Motorsports	Chevrolet
18	Bobby Labonte	Joe Gibbs Racing	Chevrolet
21	Morgan Shepherd	Wood Brothers Racing	Ford
22	Ward Burton	Bill Davis Racing	Pontiac
23	Jimmy Spencer	Haas-Carter Motorsports	Ford
24	Jeff Gordon	Hendrick Motorsports	Chevrolet
25	Ken Schrader	Hendrick Motorsports	Chevrolet
26	Hut Stricklin	King Racing	Ford
27	Elton Sawyer	Junior Johnson & Associates	Ford
28	Dale Jarrett	Robert Yates Racing	Ford
29	Steve Grissom	Diamond Ridge Motorsports	Chevrolet
30	Michael Waltrip	Bahari Racing	Pontiac
31	Jimmy Hensley	A.G. Dillard Motorsports	Chevrolet
32	Greg Sacks	Active Motorsports	Chevrolet
33	Robert Pressley (R)	Leo Jackson Motorsports	Chevrolet
37	John Andretti	Kranefuss-Haas Racing	Ford
40	Rich Bickle	Dick Brooks Racing	Pontiac
41	Ricky Craven (R)	Larry Hedrick Motorsports	Chevrolet
42	Kyle Petty	Team SABCO	Pontiac
43	Bobby Hamilton	Petty Enterprises	Pontiac
71	Dave Marcis	Marcis Auto Racing	Chevrolet
75	Todd Bodine	Butch Mock Motorsports	Ford
77	Bobby Hillin Jr.	Jasper Motorsports	Ford
78	Jay Hedgecock	Triad Motorsports	Ford
87	Joe Nemechek	NEMCO Motorsports	Chevrolet
88	Ernie Irvan	Robert Yates Racing	Ford
90	Mike Wallace	Donlavey Racing	Ford
94	Bill Elliott	Elliott-Hardy Racing	Ford
98	Jeremy Mayfield	Cale Yarborough Motorsports	Ford

== Qualifying ==
Qualifying was split into two rounds. The first round was held on Friday, September 29, at 3:00 PM EST. Each driver would have one lap to set a time. During the first round, the top 25 drivers in the round would be guaranteed a starting spot in the race. If a driver was not able to guarantee a spot in the first round, they had the option to scrub their time from the first round and try and run a faster lap time in a second round qualifying run, held on Saturday, September 30, at 12:00 PM EST. As with the first round, each driver would have one lap to set a time. For this specific race, positions 26-32 would be decided on time, and depending on who needed it, a select amount of positions were given to cars who had not otherwise qualified but were high enough in owner's points; which was usually four. If needed, a past champion who did not qualify on either time or provisionals could use a champion's provisional, adding one more spot to the field.

Ted Musgrave, driving for Roush Racing, would win the pole, setting a time of 19.004 and an average speed of 118.396 miles per hour (190.540 km/h) in the first round.

Seven drivers would fail to qualify.

=== Full qualifying results ===
Pos.	#	Driver	Team	Make	Time	Speed
1	16	Ted Musgrave	Roush Racing	Ford	19.004	118.396
2	6	Mark Martin	Roush Racing	Ford	19.011	118.353
3	43	Bobby Hamilton	Petty Enterprises	Pontiac	19.054	118.085
4	17	Darrell Waltrip	Darrell Waltrip Motorsports	Chevrolet	19.078	117.937
5	30	Michael Waltrip	Bahari Racing	Pontiac	19.098	117.813
6	28	Dale Jarrett	Robert Yates Racing	Ford	19.113	117.721
7	88	Ernie Irvan	Robert Yates Racing	Ford	19.126	117.641
8	25	Ken Schrader	Hendrick Motorsports	Chevrolet	19.127	117.635
9	21	Morgan Shepherd	Wood Brothers Racing	Ford	19.148	117.506
10	4	Sterling Marlin	Morgan–McClure Motorsports	Chevrolet	19.154	117.469
11	5	Terry Labonte	Hendrick Motorsports	Chevrolet	19.165	117.402
12	40	Rich Bickle	Dick Brooks Racing	Pontiac	19.169	117.377
13	3	Dale Earnhardt	Richard Childress Racing	Chevrolet	19.188	117.261
14	24	Jeff Gordon	Hendrick Motorsports	Chevrolet	19.216	117.090
15	71	Dave Marcis	Marcis Auto Racing	Chevrolet	19.225	117.035
16	7	Geoff Bodine	Geoff Bodine Racing	Ford	19.239	116.950
17	41	Ricky Craven (R)	Larry Hedrick Motorsports	Chevrolet	19.258	116.835
18	2	Rusty Wallace	Penske Racing South	Ford	19.260	116.822
19	31	Jimmy Hensley	A.G. Dillard Motorsports	Chevrolet	19.266	116.786
20	23	Jimmy Spencer	Travis Carter Enterprises	Ford	19.276	116.725
21	27	Elton Sawyer	Junior Johnson & Associates	Ford	19.289	116.647
22	18	Bobby Labonte	Joe Gibbs Racing	Chevrolet	19.298	116.592
23	11	Brett Bodine	Junior Johnson & Associates	Ford	19.308	116.532
24	10	Ricky Rudd	Rudd Performance Motorsports	Ford	19.329	116.405
25	26	Hut Stricklin	King Racing	Ford	19.334	116.375
Failed to lock in Round 1
26	1	Rick Mast	Precision Products Racing	Ford	19.158	117.444
27	42	Kyle Petty	Team SABCO	Pontiac	19.250	116.883
28	87	Joe Nemechek	NEMCO Motorsports	Chevrolet	19.343	116.321
29	15	Dick Trickle	Bud Moore Engineering	Ford	19.350	116.279
30	29	Steve Grissom	Diamond Ridge Motorsports	Chevrolet	19.360	116.219
31	77	Bobby Hillin Jr.	Jasper Motorsports	Ford	19.361	116.213
32	94	Bill Elliott	Elliott-Hardy Racing	Ford	19.364	116.195
Provisionals
33	12	Derrike Cope	Bobby Allison Motorsports	Ford	-*	-*
34	37	John Andretti	Kranefuss-Haas Racing	Ford	-*	-*
35	9	Lake Speed	Melling Racing	Ford	-*	-*
36	33	Robert Pressley (R)	Leo Jackson Motorsports	Chevrolet	-*	-*
Failed to qualify
37	75	Todd Bodine	Butch Mock Motorsports	Ford	-*	-*
38	32	Greg Sacks	Active Motorsports	Chevrolet	-*	-*
39	98	Jeremy Mayfield	Cale Yarborough Motorsports	Ford	-*	-*
40	22	Ward Burton	Bill Davis Racing	Pontiac	-*	-*
41	8	Jeff Burton	Stavola Brothers Racing	Ford	-*	-*
42	90	Mike Wallace	Donlavey Racing	Ford	-*	-*
43	78	Jay Hedgecock	Triad Motorsports	Ford	-*	-*
Official first round qualifying results
Official starting lineup

== Race results ==
Fin	St	#	Driver	Team	Make	Laps	Led	Status	Pts	Winnings
1	2	6	Mark Martin	Roush Racing	Ford	400	126	running	185	$71,590
2	18	2	Rusty Wallace	Penske Racing South	Ford	400	0	running	170	$38,915
3	14	24	Jeff Gordon	Hendrick Motorsports	Chevrolet	400	12	running	170	$33,065
4	11	5	Terry Labonte	Hendrick Motorsports	Chevrolet	400	0	running	160	$28,595
5	24	10	Ricky Rudd	Rudd Performance Motorsports	Ford	400	58	running	160	$31,640
6	7	88	Ernie Irvan	Robert Yates Racing	Ford	400	31	running	155	$14,715
7	6	28	Dale Jarrett	Robert Yates Racing	Ford	400	108	running	151	$24,790
8	8	25	Ken Schrader	Hendrick Motorsports	Chevrolet	399	2	running	147	$19,200
9	13	3	Dale Earnhardt	Richard Childress Racing	Chevrolet	399	5	running	143	$27,850
10	32	94	Bill Elliott	Elliott-Hardy Racing	Ford	399	0	running	134	$17,530
11	16	7	Geoff Bodine	Geoff Bodine Racing	Ford	399	0	running	130	$22,150
12	5	30	Michael Waltrip	Bahari Racing	Pontiac	399	0	running	127	$16,825
13	33	12	Derrike Cope	Bobby Allison Motorsports	Ford	399	0	running	124	$11,600
14	4	17	Darrell Waltrip	Darrell Waltrip Motorsports	Chevrolet	399	6	running	126	$16,325
15	10	4	Sterling Marlin	Morgan–McClure Motorsports	Chevrolet	398	0	running	118	$21,075
16	3	43	Bobby Hamilton	Petty Enterprises	Pontiac	398	26	running	120	$11,025
17	34	37	John Andretti	Kranefuss-Haas Racing	Ford	398	6	running	117	$10,875
18	22	18	Bobby Labonte	Joe Gibbs Racing	Chevrolet	398	6	running	114	$19,700
19	29	15	Dick Trickle	Bud Moore Engineering	Ford	397	0	running	106	$15,700
20	1	16	Ted Musgrave	Roush Racing	Ford	396	12	running	108	$26,100
21	17	41	Ricky Craven (R)	Larry Hedrick Motorsports	Chevrolet	395	0	running	100	$11,225
22	23	11	Brett Bodine	Junior Johnson & Associates	Ford	395	0	running	97	$19,475
23	9	21	Morgan Shepherd	Wood Brothers Racing	Ford	395	0	running	94	$14,925
24	31	77	Bobby Hillin Jr.	Jasper Motorsports	Ford	395	0	running	91	$6,300
25	25	26	Hut Stricklin	King Racing	Ford	394	0	running	88	$11,375
26	26	1	Rick Mast	Precision Products Racing	Ford	394	0	running	85	$16,650
27	12	40	Rich Bickle	Dick Brooks Racing	Pontiac	394	2	running	87	$11,100
28	15	71	Dave Marcis	Marcis Auto Racing	Chevrolet	394	0	running	79	$9,435
29	19	31	Jimmy Hensley	A.G. Dillard Motorsports	Chevrolet	394	0	running	76	$9,325
30	27	42	Kyle Petty	Team SABCO	Pontiac	393	0	running	73	$13,925
31	30	29	Steve Grissom	Diamond Ridge Motorsports	Chevrolet	393	0	running	70	$8,726
32	28	87	Joe Nemechek	NEMCO Motorsports	Chevrolet	393	0	running	67	$8,600
33	36	33	Robert Pressley (R)	Leo Jackson Motorsports	Chevrolet	392	0	running	64	$13,575
34	21	27	Elton Sawyer	Junior Johnson & Associates	Ford	392	0	running	61	$13,550
35	35	9	Lake Speed	Melling Racing	Ford	391	0	running	58	$8,075
36	20	23	Jimmy Spencer	Travis Carter Enterprises	Ford	390	0	running	55	$5,550
Official race results

Previous race: 1995 Goody's 500 (Martinsville)	NASCAR Winston Cup Series; 1995 season	Next race: 1995 UAW-GM Quality 500
