= 1995 UAW-GM Quality 500 =

28th race of the 1995 NASCAR Winston Cup Series

Race details
- Race 28 of 31 in the 1995 NASCAR Winston Cup Series
- The 1995 UAW-GM Quality 500 program cover, with artwork by NASCAR artist Sam Bass.
- Date: October 8, 1995
- Official name: 36th Annual UAW-GM Quality 500
- Location: Concord, North Carolina, Charlotte Motor Speedway
- Course: Permanent racing facility
- Course length: 1.5 miles (2.41 km)
- Distance: 334 laps, 501 mi (806.281 km)
- Scheduled distance: 334 laps, 501 mi (806.281 km)
- Average speed: 145.358 miles per hour (233.931 km/h)

Pole position
Driver	Ricky Rudd	Rudd Performance Motorsports
- Time: 29.904

Most laps led
Driver	Ricky Rudd	Rudd Performance Motorsports
- Laps: 107

Winner
No. 6	Mark Martin	Roush Racing

Television in the United States
- Network: TBS
- Announcers: Ken Squier, Ernie Irvan, Dick Berggren

Radio in the United States
- Radio: Performance Racing Network

The 1995 UAW-GM Quality 500 was the 28th stock car race of the 1995 NASCAR Winston Cup Series and the 36th iteration of the event. The race was held on Sunday, October 8, 1995, in Concord, North Carolina, at Charlotte Motor Speedway, a 1.5 miles (2.4 km) permanent quad-oval. The race took the scheduled 334 laps to complete. In the final laps of the race, Roush Racing driver Mark Martin would manage to chase down Richard Childress Racing driver Dale Earnhardt for the lead, passing Earnhardt with three to go to take his 18th career NASCAR Winston Cup Series victory and his fourth and final victory of the season. To fill out the top three, the aforementioned Earnhardt and Hendrick Motorsports driver Terry Labonte would finish second and third, respectively.

In the overall driver's championship points standings, Dale Earnhardt would manage to close the gap between points leader Jeff Gordon by 97 points, decreasing Gordon's lead to 205 points.

== Background ==
The layout of Charlotte Motor Speedway, the venue where the race was held.

Charlotte Motor Speedway is a motorsports complex located in Concord, North Carolina, United States 13 miles from Charlotte, North Carolina. The complex features a 1.5 miles (2.4 km) quad oval track that hosts NASCAR racing including the prestigious Coca-Cola 600 on Memorial Day weekend and the NEXTEL All-Star Challenge, as well as the UAW-GM Quality 500. The speedway was built in 1959 by Bruton Smith and is considered the home track for NASCAR with many race teams located in the Charlotte area. The track is owned and operated by Speedway Motorsports Inc. (SMI) with Marcus G. Smith (son of Bruton Smith) as track president.

=== Entry list ===
- (R) denotes rookie driver.

#	Driver	Team	Make
0	Delma Cowart	H. L. Waters Racing	Ford
1	Rick Mast	Precision Products Racing	Pontiac
2	Rusty Wallace	Penske Racing South	Ford
3	Dale Earnhardt	Richard Childress Racing	Chevrolet
4	Sterling Marlin	Morgan–McClure Motorsports	Chevrolet
5	Terry Labonte	Hendrick Motorsports	Chevrolet
6	Mark Martin	Roush Racing	Ford
7	Geoff Bodine	Geoff Bodine Racing	Ford
8	Jeff Burton	Stavola Brothers Racing	Ford
9	Lake Speed	Melling Racing	Ford
10	Ricky Rudd	Rudd Performance Motorsports	Ford
11	Brett Bodine	Junior Johnson & Associates	Ford
12	Derrike Cope	Bobby Allison Motorsports	Ford
15	Dick Trickle	Bud Moore Engineering	Ford
16	Ted Musgrave	Roush Racing	Ford
17	Darrell Waltrip	Darrell Waltrip Motorsports	Chevrolet
18	Bobby Labonte	Joe Gibbs Racing	Chevrolet
19	Loy Allen Jr.	TriStar Motorsports	Ford
21	Morgan Shepherd	Wood Brothers Racing	Ford
22	Ward Burton	Bill Davis Racing	Pontiac
23	Jimmy Spencer	Haas-Carter Motorsports	Ford
24	Jeff Gordon	Hendrick Motorsports	Chevrolet
25	Ken Schrader	Hendrick Motorsports	Chevrolet
26	Hut Stricklin	King Racing	Ford
27	Elton Sawyer	Junior Johnson & Associates	Ford
28	Dale Jarrett	Robert Yates Racing	Ford
29	Steve Grissom	Diamond Ridge Motorsports	Chevrolet
30	Michael Waltrip	Bahari Racing	Pontiac
31	Jimmy Hensley	A.G. Dillard Motorsports	Chevrolet
32	Greg Sacks	Active Motorsports	Chevrolet
33	Robert Pressley (R)	Leo Jackson Motorsports	Chevrolet
37	John Andretti	Kranefuss-Haas Racing	Ford
40	Rich Bickle	Dick Brooks Racing	Pontiac
41	Ricky Craven (R)	Larry Hedrick Motorsports	Chevrolet
42	Kyle Petty	Team SABCO	Pontiac
43	Bobby Hamilton	Petty Enterprises	Pontiac
44	Jeff Purvis	Phoenix Racing	Chevrolet
66	Billy Standridge	Johnson Standridge Racing	Ford
71	Dave Marcis	Marcis Auto Racing	Chevrolet
75	Todd Bodine	Butch Mock Motorsports	Ford
77	Bobby Hillin Jr.	Jasper Motorsports	Ford
81	Kenny Wallace	FILMAR Racing	Ford
87	Joe Nemechek	NEMCO Motorsports	Chevrolet
90	Mike Wallace	Donlavey Racing	Ford
93	Gary Bradberry	Bradberry Racing	Chevrolet
94	Bill Elliott	Elliott-Hardy Racing	Ford
97	Chad Little	Mark Rypien Motorsports	Ford
98	Jeremy Mayfield	Cale Yarborough Motorsports	Ford

== Qualifying ==
Qualifying was split into two rounds. The first round was held on Friday, October 6, at 12:00 PM EST. Each driver would have one lap to set a time. During the first round, the top 25 drivers in the round would be guaranteed a starting spot in the race. If a driver was not able to guarantee a spot in the first round, they had the option to scrub their time from the first round and try and run a faster lap time in a second round qualifying run, held on Saturday, October 7, at 10:00 AM EST. As with the first round, each driver would have one lap to set a time. For this specific race, positions 26-38 would be decided on time, and depending on who needed it, a select amount of positions were given to cars who had not otherwise qualified but were high enough in owner's points; which was usually four. If needed, a past champion who did not qualify on either time or provisionals could use a champion's provisional, adding one more spot to the field.

Ricky Rudd, driving for Rudd Performance Motorsports, would win the pole, setting a time of 29.904 and an average speed of 180.578 miles per hour (290.612 km/h) in the first round.

Five drivers would fail to qualify.

=== Full qualifying results ===
Pos.	#	Driver	Team	Make	Time	Speed
1	10	Ricky Rudd	Rudd Performance Motorsports	Ford	29.904	180.578
2	41	Ricky Craven (R)	Larry Hedrick Motorsports	Chevrolet	30.025	179.850
3	24	Jeff Gordon	Hendrick Motorsports	Chevrolet	30.061	179.635
4	30	Michael Waltrip	Bahari Racing	Pontiac	30.096	179.426
5	6	Mark Martin	Roush Racing	Ford	30.111	179.336
6	21	Morgan Shepherd	Wood Brothers Racing	Ford	30.112	179.330
7	75	Todd Bodine	Butch Mock Motorsports	Ford	30.135	179.194
8	5	Terry Labonte	Hendrick Motorsports	Chevrolet	30.143	179.146
9	43	Bobby Hamilton	Petty Enterprises	Pontiac	30.147	179.122
10	22	Ward Burton	Bill Davis Racing	Pontiac	30.182	178.915
11	98	Jeremy Mayfield	Cale Yarborough Motorsports	Ford	30.185	178.897
12	15	Dick Trickle	Bud Moore Engineering	Ford	30.199	178.814
13	8	Jeff Burton	Stavola Brothers Racing	Ford	30.200	178.808
14	4	Sterling Marlin	Morgan–McClure Motorsports	Chevrolet	30.219	178.696
15	87	Joe Nemechek	NEMCO Motorsports	Chevrolet	30.234	178.607
16	37	John Andretti	Kranefuss-Haas Racing	Ford	30.238	178.583
17	16	Ted Musgrave	Roush Racing	Ford	30.247	178.530
18	42	Kyle Petty	Team SABCO	Pontiac	30.250	178.512
19	33	Robert Pressley (R)	Leo Jackson Motorsports	Chevrolet	30.277	178.353
20	2	Rusty Wallace	Penske Racing South	Ford	30.285	178.306
21	26	Hut Stricklin	King Racing	Ford	30.291	178.271
22	11	Brett Bodine	Junior Johnson & Associates	Ford	30.296	178.241
23	77	Bobby Hillin Jr.	Jasper Motorsports	Ford	30.316	178.124
24	18	Bobby Labonte	Joe Gibbs Racing	Chevrolet	30.320	178.100
25	71	Dave Marcis	Marcis Auto Racing	Chevrolet	30.352	177.912
Failed to lock in Round 1
26	9	Lake Speed	Melling Racing	Ford	30.234	178.607
27	19	Loy Allen Jr.	TriStar Motorsports	Ford	30.244	178.548
28	94	Bill Elliott	Elliott-Hardy Racing	Ford	30.268	178.406
29	25	Ken Schrader	Hendrick Motorsports	Chevrolet	30.272	178.383
30	93	Gary Bradberry	Bradberry Racing	Chevrolet	30.310	178.159
31	28	Dale Jarrett	Robert Yates Racing	Ford	30.377	177.766
32	17	Darrell Waltrip	Darrell Waltrip Motorsports	Chevrolet	30.394	177.667
33	32	Greg Sacks	Active Motorsports	Chevrolet	30.399	177.637
34	7	Geoff Bodine	Geoff Bodine Racing	Ford	30.438	177.410
35	1	Rick Mast	Precision Products Racing	Ford	30.469	177.229
36	23	Jimmy Spencer	Travis Carter Enterprises	Ford	30.516	176.956
37	29	Steve Grissom	Diamond Ridge Motorsports	Chevrolet	30.519	176.939
38	31	Jimmy Hensley	A.G. Dillard Motorsports	Chevrolet	30.522	176.922
Provisionals
39	12	Derrike Cope	Bobby Allison Motorsports	Ford	-*	-*
40	90	Mike Wallace	Donlavey Racing	Ford	-*	-*
41	27	Elton Sawyer	Junior Johnson & Associates	Ford	-*	-*
42	40	Rich Bickle	Dick Brooks Racing	Pontiac	-*	-*
Champion's Provisional
43	3	Dale Earnhardt	Richard Childress Racing	Chevrolet	-*	-*
Failed to qualify
44	97	Chad Little	Mark Rypien Motorsports	Ford	-*	-*
45	81	Kenny Wallace	FILMAR Racing	Ford	-*	-*
46	44	Jeff Purvis	Phoenix Racing	Chevrolet	-*	-*
47	0	Delma Cowart	H. L. Waters Racing	Ford	-*	-*
48	66	Billy Standridge	Johnson Standridge Racing	Ford	-*	-*
Official first round qualifying results
Official starting lineup

== Race results ==
Fin	St	#	Driver	Team	Make	Laps	Led	Status	Pts	Winnings
1	5	6	Mark Martin	Roush Racing	Ford	334	5	running	180	$105,650
2	43	3	Dale Earnhardt	Richard Childress Racing	Chevrolet	334	2	running	175	$86,800
3	8	5	Terry Labonte	Hendrick Motorsports	Chevrolet	334	52	running	170	$73,750
4	1	10	Ricky Rudd	Rudd Performance Motorsports	Ford	334	107	running	170	$90,200
5	31	28	Dale Jarrett	Robert Yates Racing	Ford	334	0	running	155	$51,400
6	14	4	Sterling Marlin	Morgan–McClure Motorsports	Chevrolet	334	90	running	155	$51,000
7	10	22	Ward Burton	Bill Davis Racing	Pontiac	334	42	running	151	$48,000
8	24	18	Bobby Labonte	Joe Gibbs Racing	Chevrolet	334	3	running	147	$33,000
9	20	2	Rusty Wallace	Penske Racing South	Ford	334	0	running	138	$34,200
10	9	43	Bobby Hamilton	Petty Enterprises	Pontiac	334	0	running	134	$26,000
11	39	12	Derrike Cope	Bobby Allison Motorsports	Ford	334	0	running	130	$20,100
12	36	23	Jimmy Spencer	Travis Carter Enterprises	Ford	334	0	running	127	$17,000
13	16	37	John Andretti	Kranefuss-Haas Racing	Ford	334	0	running	124	$15,500
14	6	21	Morgan Shepherd	Wood Brothers Racing	Ford	334	5	running	126	$19,900
15	18	42	Kyle Petty	Team SABCO	Pontiac	333	0	running	118	$19,200
16	34	7	Geoff Bodine	Geoff Bodine Racing	Ford	333	0	running	115	$22,600
17	4	30	Michael Waltrip	Bahari Racing	Pontiac	333	4	running	117	$18,900
18	21	26	Hut Stricklin	King Racing	Ford	333	0	running	109	$11,900
19	17	16	Ted Musgrave	Roush Racing	Ford	333	0	running	106	$15,400
20	28	94	Bill Elliott	Elliott-Hardy Racing	Ford	332	0	running	103	$11,750
21	26	9	Lake Speed	Melling Racing	Ford	332	0	running	100	$10,150
22	15	87	Joe Nemechek	NEMCO Motorsports	Chevrolet	332	0	running	97	$9,345
23	40	90	Mike Wallace	Donlavey Racing	Ford	332	0	running	94	$6,065
24	23	77	Bobby Hillin Jr.	Jasper Motorsports	Ford	331	1	running	96	$5,525
25	2	41	Ricky Craven (R)	Larry Hedrick Motorsports	Chevrolet	331	0	running	88	$14,990
26	7	75	Todd Bodine	Butch Mock Motorsports	Ford	329	0	running	85	$14,165
27	22	11	Brett Bodine	Junior Johnson & Associates	Ford	329	0	running	82	$18,150
28	41	27	Elton Sawyer	Junior Johnson & Associates	Ford	328	0	running	79	$13,030
29	11	98	Jeremy Mayfield	Cale Yarborough Motorsports	Ford	326	0	running	76	$8,120
30	3	24	Jeff Gordon	Hendrick Motorsports	Chevrolet	321	23	running	78	$25,915
31	13	8	Jeff Burton	Stavola Brothers Racing	Ford	219	0	crash	70	$12,820
32	12	15	Dick Trickle	Bud Moore Engineering	Ford	210	0	crash	67	$12,640
33	33	32	Greg Sacks	Active Motorsports	Chevrolet	168	0	engine	64	$4,565
34	32	17	Darrell Waltrip	Darrell Waltrip Motorsports	Chevrolet	163	0	crash	61	$12,540
35	29	25	Ken Schrader	Hendrick Motorsports	Chevrolet	140	0	crash	58	$12,015
36	35	1	Rick Mast	Precision Products Racing	Ford	138	0	crash	55	$9,500
37	27	19	Loy Allen Jr.	TriStar Motorsports	Ford	136	0	crash	52	$4,490
38	42	40	Rich Bickle	Dick Brooks Racing	Pontiac	126	0	water pump	49	$9,455
39	38	31	Jimmy Hensley	A.G. Dillard Motorsports	Chevrolet	107	0	oil pump	46	$4,455
40	25	71	Dave Marcis	Marcis Auto Racing	Chevrolet	51	0	engine	43	$4,455
41	37	29	Steve Grissom	Diamond Ridge Motorsports	Chevrolet	46	0	piston	40	$4,455
42	19	33	Robert Pressley (R)	Leo Jackson Motorsports	Chevrolet	22	0	crash	37	$9,955
43	30	93	Gary Bradberry	Bradberry Racing	Chevrolet	6	0	crash	34	$4,455
Official race results

Previous race: 1995 Tyson Holly Farms 400	NASCAR Winston Cup Series; 1995 season	Next race: 1995 AC Delco 400
