= 2021 Steakhouse Elite 200 =

Race details
- Race 9 of 33 in the 2021 NASCAR Xfinity Series season
- Date: May 8, 2021
- Location: Darlington Raceway in Darlington, South Carolina
- Course: Permanent racing facility
- Course length: 1.366 miles (2.198 km)
- Distance: 148 laps, 202.168 mi (325.358 km)
- Scheduled distance: 147 laps, 200.802 mi (323.159 km)
- Average speed: 98.739 mph (158.905 km/h)

Pole position
Driver	A. J. Allmendinger	Kaulig Racing
- Grid positions set by competition-based formula

Most laps led
Driver	Noah Gragson	JR Motorsports
- Laps: 40

Winner
No. 7	Justin Allgaier	JR Motorsports

Television in the United States
- Network: FS1
- Announcers: Adam Alexander, Kevin Harvick, and Bubba Wallace

The 2021 Steakhouse Elite 200 was a NASCAR Xfinity Series race held on May 8, 2021. It was contested over 148 laps—extended from 147 laps due to an overtime finish—on the 1.366-mile (2.198 km) egg-shaped oval. It was the ninth race of the 2021 NASCAR Xfinity Series season. JR Motorsports driver Justin Allgaier, collected his second win of the season.

== Report ==
=== Background ===
Darlington Raceway is a race track built for NASCAR racing located near Darlington, South Carolina. It is nicknamed "The Lady in Black" and "The Track Too Tough to Tame" by many NASCAR fans and drivers and advertised as "A NASCAR Tradition." It is of a unique, somewhat egg-shaped design, an oval with the ends of very different configurations, a condition which supposedly arose from the proximity of one end of the track to a minnow pond the owner refused to relocate. This situation makes it very challenging for the crews to set up their cars' handling in a way that is effective at both ends.

=== Entry list ===
- (R) denotes rookie driver.
- (i) denotes driver who is ineligible for series driver points.

No.	Driver	Team	Manufacturer	Throwback (if applicable)
0	Jeffrey Earnhardt	JD Motorsports	Chevrolet	Dale Earnhardt's 1996 Summer Olympics scheme
1	Michael Annett	JR Motorsports	Chevrolet	Darrell Waltrip's 1979 Gatorade scheme
2	Myatt Snider	Richard Childress Racing	Chevrolet	Jimmie Lewallen's 1950s scheme
02	Brett Moffitt	Our Motorsports	Chevrolet	
03	Andy Lally	Our Motorsports	Chevrolet	
4	Landon Cassill	JD Motorsports	Chevrolet	
5	Matt Mills	B. J. McLeod Motorsports	Chevrolet	
6	Ryan Vargas (R)	JD Motorsports	Chevrolet	Mark Martin's 1994 Valvoline scheme
7	Justin Allgaier	JR Motorsports	Chevrolet	Dale Earnhardt's 2000 Daytona 500 Tasmanian Devil scheme
07	Joe Graf Jr.	SS-Green Light Racing	Chevrolet	DeLorean from Back to the Future
8	Josh Berry(R)	JR Motorsports	Chevrolet	Dale Earnhardt Jr.'s 2001 Pepsi 400 scheme
9	Noah Gragson	JR Motorsports	Chevrolet	
10	Jeb Burton	Kaulig Racing	Chevrolet	Ward Burton's 1995 AC Delco 400 win
11	Justin Haley	Kaulig Racing	Chevrolet	Blake Koch's NASCAR Cup Series debut in 2014
13	Matt Jaskol	MBM Motorsports	Toyota	Mike Skinner's 1991 scheme
15	Colby Howard	JD Motorsports	Chevrolet	Rodney Howard's early 1980s late model scheme
16	A. J. Allmendinger	Kaulig Racing	Chevrolet	2014 Cheez-It 355 at The Glen win
17	J. J. Yeley	SS-Green Light Racing with Rick Ware Racing	Chevrolet	
18	Daniel Hemric	Joe Gibbs Racing	Toyota	Red Farmer throwback
19	Brandon Jones	Joe Gibbs Racing	Toyota	Todd Bodine's 2006 Truck championship scheme
20	Harrison Burton	Joe Gibbs Racing	Toyota	Jeff Burton's Holiday Inn throwback
22	Austin Cindric	Team Penske	Ford	
23	Tanner Berryhill	Our Motorsports	Chevrolet	
26	Brandon Gdovic	Sam Hunt Racing	Toyota	Kyle Petty's 1997 Hot Wheels scheme
31	Jordan Anderson (I)	Jordan Anderson Racing	Chevrolet	
36	Alex Labbé	DGM Racing	Chevrolet	Kenny Wallace's 1994-96 Red Dog scheme
39	Ryan Sieg	RSS Racing	Ford	
44	Tommy Joe Martins	Martins Motorsports	Chevrolet	Rich Bickle's 10-10-345 scheme
47	Kyle Weatherman	Mike Harmon Racing	Chevrolet	Richard Petty's STP scheme
48	Jade Buford (R)	Big Machine Racing Team	Chevrolet	Dan Gurney's 1970 Trans-Am Series throwback
51	Jeremy Clements	Jeremy Clements Racing	Chevrolet	Dale Jarrett UPS throwback
52	Gray Gaulding	Means Racing	Chevrolet	
54	Ty Gibbs (R)	Joe Gibbs Racing	Toyota	30th anniversary of Interstate Batteries sponsorship
61	David Starr	Hattori Racing Enterprises	Toyota	Richie Evans' scheme
66	Timmy Hill (i)	MBM Motorsports	Ford	Rusty Wallace's 2004 Duraflame scheme
68	Brandon Brown	Brandonbilt Motorsports	Chevrolet	Dale Jarrett's 2002 UPS scheme
74	Bayley Currey (i)	Mike Harmon Racing	Chevrolet	Bobby Allison's "Grey Ghost"
77	Ronnie Bassett Jr.	Bassett Racing	Chevrolet	
78	Jesse Little	B. J. McLeod Motorsports	Chevrolet	
90	B. J. McLeod (i)	DGM Racing	Chevrolet	Ken Schrader's 1985 rookie scheme
92	Josh Williams	DGM Racing	Chevrolet	Rusty Crews' throwback
98	Riley Herbst	Stewart-Haas Racing	Ford	Tony Stewart's 1999 The Home Depot rookie scheme
99	Ryan Ellis	B. J. McLeod Motorsports	Toyota	Vic Ellis' 1950s scheme
Official entry list

== Qualifying ==
A. J. Allmendinger was awarded the pole for the race as determined by competition-based formula. Jordan Anderson, Ronnie Bassett Jr., and Andy Lally did not have enough points to qualify for the race.

=== Starting Lineups ===
Pos	No	Driver	Team	Manufacturer
1	16	A. J. Allmendinger	Kaulig Racing	Chevrolet
2	22	Austin Cindric	Team Penske	Ford
3	10	Jeb Burton	Kaulig Racing	Chevrolet
4	11	Justin Haley	Kaulig Racing	Chevrolet
5	9	Noah Gragson	JR Motorsports	Chevrolet
6	98	Riley Herbst	Stewart-Haas Racing	Ford
7	18	Daniel Hemric	Joe Gibbs Racing	Toyota
8	20	Harrison Burton	Joe Gibbs Racing	Toyota
9	68	Brandon Brown	Brandonbilt Motorsports	Chevrolet
10	2	Myatt Snider	Richard Childress Racing	Chevrolet
11	39	Ryan Sieg	RSS Racing	Ford
12	51	Jeremy Clements	Jeremy Clements Racing	Chevrolet
13	02	Brett Moffitt	Our Motorsports	Chevrolet
14	44	Tommy Joe Martins	Martins Motorsports	Chevrolet
15	66	Timmy Hill (i)	MBM Motorsports	Ford
16	7	Justin Allgaier	JR Motorsports	Chevrolet
17	61	David Starr	Hattori Racing Enterprises	Toyota
18	48	Jade Buford	Big Machine Racing Team	Chevrolet
19	4	Landon Cassill	JD Motorsports	Chevrolet
20	1	Michael Annett	JR Motorsports	Chevrolet
21	92	Josh Williams	DGM Racing	Chevrolet
22	19	Brandon Jones	Joe Gibbs Racing	Toyota
23	36	Alex Labbé	DGM Racing	Chevrolet
24	8	Josh Berry (R)	JR Motorsports	Chevrolet
25	15	Colby Howard	JD Motorsports	Chevrolet
26	47	Kyle Weatherman	Mike Harmon Racing	Chevrolet
27	26	Brandon Gdovic	Sam Hunt Racing	Toyota
28	0	Jeffrey Earnhardt	JD Motorsports	Chevrolet
29	54	Ty Gibbs (R)	Joe Gibbs Racing	Toyota
30	07	Joe Graf Jr.	SS-Green Light Racing	Chevrolet
31	78	Jesse Little	B. J. McLeod Motorsports	Chevrolet
32	5	Matt Mills	B. J. McLeod Motorsports	Chevrolet
33	99	Ryan Ellis	B. J. McLeod Motorsports	Toyota
34	6	Ryan Vargas (R)	JD Motorsports	Chevrolet
35	17	J. J. Yeley	SS-Green Light Racing with Rick Ware Racing	Chevrolet
36	23	Tanner Berryhill	Our Motorsports	Chevrolet
37	52	Gray Gaulding	Means Motorsports	Chevrolet
38	90	B. J. McLeod(i)	DGM Racing	Chevrolet
39	74	Bayley Currey (i)	Mike Harmon Racing	Chevrolet
40	13	Matt Jaskol	MBM Motorsports	Toyota
Official qualifying results

== Race ==
=== Race results ===
==== Stage Results ====
Stage One Laps: 45

Pos	No	Driver	Team	Manufacturer	Points
1	22	Austin Cindric	Team Penske	Ford	10
2	9	Noah Gragson	JR Motorsports	Chevrolet	9
3	20	Harrison Burton	Joe Gibbs Racing	Toyota	8
4	18	Daniel Hemric	Joe Gibbs Racing	Toyota	7
5	44	Tommy Joe Martins	Martins Motorsports	Chevrolet	6
6	16	A. J. Allmendinger	Kaulig Racing	Chevrolet	5
7	2	Myatt Snider	Richard Childress Racing	Chevrolet	4
8	7	Justin Allgaier	JR Motorsports	Chevrolet	3
9	54	Ty Gibbs (R)	Joe Gibbs Racing	Toyota	2
10	1	Michael Annett	JR Motorsports	Chevrolet	1

Stage Two Laps: 45

Pos	No	Driver	Team	Manufacturer	Points
1	20	Harrison Burton	Joe Gibbs Racing	Toyota	10
2	9	Noah Gragson	JR Motorsports	Chevrolet	9
3	16	A. J. Allmendinger	Kaulig Racing	Chevrolet	8
4	8	Josh Berry (R)	JR Motorsports	Chevrolet	7
5	39	Ryan Sieg	RSS Racing	Ford	6
6	10	Jeb Burton	Kaulig Racing	Chevrolet	5
7	1	Michael Annett	JR Motorsports	Chevrolet	4
8	7	Justin Allgaier	JR Motorsports	Chevrolet	3
9	22	Austin Cindric	Team Penske	Ford	2
10	02	Brett Moffitt	Our Motorsports	Chevrolet	1

=== Final Stage Results ===
Laps: 57

Pos	Grid	No	Driver	Team	Manufacturer	Laps	Points	Status
1	16	7	Justin Allgaier	JR Motorsports	Chevrolet	148	46	Running
2	24	8	Josh Berry (R)	JR Motorsports	Chevrolet	148	42	Running
3	22	19	Brandon Jones	Joe Gibbs Racing	Toyota	148	34	Running
4	5	9	Noah Gragson	JR Motorsports	Chevrolet	148	51	Running
5	7	18	Daniel Hemric	Joe Gibbs Racing	Toyota	148	39	Running
6	12	51	Jeremy Clements	Jeremy Clements Racing	Chevrolet	148	31	Running
7	20	1	Michael Annett	JR Motorsports	Chevrolet	148	35	Running
8	13	02	Brett Moffitt	Our Motorsports	Chevrolet	148	30	Running
9	11	39	Ryan Sieg	RSS Racing	Ford	148	34	Running
10	23	36	Alex Labbé	DGM Racing	Chevrolet	148	27	Running
11	8	20	Harrison Burton	Joe Gibbs Racing	Toyota	148	44	Running
12	19	4	Landon Cassill	JD Motorsports	Chevrolet	148	25	Running
13	1	16	A. J. Allmendinger	Kaulig Racing	Chevrolet	148	37	Running
14	4	11	Justin Haley	Kaulig Racing	Chevrolet	148	23	Running
15	14	44	Tommy Joe Martins	Martins Racing	Chevrolet	148	28	Running
16	33	99	Ryan Ellis	B. J. McLeod Motorsports	Toyota	148	21	Running
17	17	61	David Starr	Hattori Racing Enterprises	Toyota	148	20	Running
18	29	54	Ty Gibbs (R)	Joe Gibbs Racing	Toyota	148	21	Running
19	10	2	Myatt Snider	Richard Childress Racing	Chevrolet	148	22	Running
20	3	10	Jeb Burton	Kaulig Racing	Chevrolet	148	22	Running
21	36	23	Tanner Berryhill	Our Motorsports	Chevrolet	148	16	Running
22	35	17	J. J. Yeley	SS-Green Light Racing with Rick Ware Racing	Chevrolet	148	15	Running
23	15	66	Timmy Hill (i)	MBM Motorsports	Ford	148	0	Running
24	9	68	Brandon Brown	Brandonbilt Motorsports	Chevrolet	148	13	Running
25	39	74	Bayley Currey (i)	Mike Harmon Racing	Chevrolet	148	0	Running
26	38	90	B. J. McLeod (i)	DGM Racing	Chevrolet	148	0	Running
27	34	6	Ryan Vargas (R)	JD Motorsports	Chevrolet	148	10	Running
28	6	98	Riley Herbst	Stewart-Haas Racing	Ford	148	9	Running
29	25	15	Colby Howard	JD Motorsports	Chevrolet	147	8	Accident
30	2	22	Austin Cindric	Team Penske	Ford	147	19	Accident
31	28	0	Jeffrey Earnhardt	JD Motorsports	Chevrolet	146	6	Running
32	31	78	Jesse Little	B. J. McLeod Motorsports	Chevrolet	146	5	Running
33	26	47	Kyle Weatherman	Mike Harmon Racing	Chevrolet	142	4	Running
34	40	13	Matt Jaskol	MBM Motorsports	Toyota	142	3	Running
35	18	48	Jade Buford (R)	Big Machine Racing Team	Chevrolet	140	2	Running
36	27	26	Brandon Gdovic	Sam Hunt Racing	Toyota	140	1	Running
37	30	07	Joe Graf Jr.	SS-Green Light Racing	Chevrolet	132	1	Accident
38	37	52	Gray Gaulding	Means Motorsports	Chevrolet	107	1	Accident
39	21	92	Josh Williams	DGM Racing	Chevrolet	48	1	Suspension
40	32	5	Matt Mills	B. J. McLeod Motorsports	Chevrolet	44	1	Accident
Official race results

=== Race statistics ===
- Lead changes: 13 among 7 different drivers
- Cautions/Laps: 9 for 43
- Time of race: 2 hours, 2 minutes, and 51 seconds
- Average speed: 98.739 mph (158.905 km/h)

Previous race: 2021 Ag-Pro 300	NASCAR Xfinity Series; 2021 season	Next race: 2021 Drydene 200
