= 1995 AC Delco 400 =

29th race of the 1995 NASCAR Winston Cup Series

Race details
- Race 29 of 31 in the 1995 NASCAR Winston Cup Series
- The 1995 AC Delco 400 program cover, featuring Dale Earnhardt and Jeff Gordon.
- Date: October 22, 1995
- Official name: 31st Annual AC Delco 400
- Location: Rockingham, North Carolina, North Carolina Motor Speedway
- Course: Permanent racing facility
- Course length: 1.017 miles (1.636 km)
- Distance: 393 laps, 399.681 mi (643.224 km)
- Scheduled distance: 393 laps, 399.681 mi (643.224 km)
- Average speed: 114.778 miles per hour (184.717 km/h)

Pole position
Driver	Hut Stricklin	King Racing
- Time: 23.563

Most laps led
Driver	Rick Mast	Precision Products Racing
- Laps: 139

Winner
No. 22	Ward Burton	Bill Davis Racing

Television in the United States
- Network: TNN
- Announcers: Mike Joy, Buddy Baker, Dick Berggren

Radio in the United States
- Radio: Motor Racing Network

The 1995 AC Delco 400 was the 29th stock car race of the 1995 NASCAR Winston Cup Series and the 31st iteration of the event. The race was held on Sunday, October 22, 1995, in Rockingham, North Carolina, at North Carolina Motor Speedway, a 1.017 miles (1.637 km) permanent high-banked racetrack. The race took the scheduled 393 laps to complete. On the final restart of the race with 10 to go, Bill Davis Racing driver Ward Burton would manage to defend the field to take his first career NASCAR Winston Cup Series victory and his only victory of the season. To fill out the top three, Penske Racing South driver Rusty Wallace and Roush Racing driver Mark Martin would finish second and third, respectively.

The race was marred in controversy when late in the race, a NASCAR official had mistaken a dark-colored lug-nut on championship contender Dale Earnhardt's car as missing, when in reality the lug-nut was on the car. Initially, Earnhardt was forced to suffer a one-lap penalty. However, after NASCAR had realized the mistake, NASCAR would declare an extended caution period to ensure that Earnhardt could gain his lost lap back. This decision led to extreme anger from drivers and their crews, saying that the caution had ruined their strategies and that the decision had preferred a single driver that had been a deterrent to every other driver.

In the overall driver's championship points race, second-place driver Dale Earnhardt was able to close the gap between himself and points leader Jeff Gordon by 43 points, decreasing Gordon's lead to 162 points. With only two races left in the season, Gordon was listed as the heavy favorite to win the championship.

== Background ==
The layout of North Carolina Speedway, the venue where the race was held.

North Carolina Speedway was opened as a flat, one-mile oval on October 31, 1965. In 1969, the track was extensively reconfigured to a high-banked, D-shaped oval just over one mile in length. In 1997, North Carolina Motor Speedway merged with Penske Motorsports, and was renamed North Carolina Speedway. Shortly thereafter, the infield was reconfigured, and competition on the infield road course, mostly by the SCCA, was discontinued. Currently, the track is home to the Fast Track High Performance Driving School.

=== Entry list ===
- (R) denotes rookie driver.

#	Driver	Team	Make
1	Rick Mast	Precision Products Racing	Pontiac
2	Rusty Wallace	Penske Racing South	Ford
3	Dale Earnhardt	Richard Childress Racing	Chevrolet
4	Sterling Marlin	Morgan–McClure Motorsports	Chevrolet
5	Terry Labonte	Hendrick Motorsports	Chevrolet
6	Mark Martin	Roush Racing	Ford
7	Geoff Bodine	Geoff Bodine Racing	Ford
8	Jeff Burton	Stavola Brothers Racing	Ford
9	Lake Speed	Melling Racing	Ford
10	Ricky Rudd	Rudd Performance Motorsports	Ford
11	Brett Bodine	Junior Johnson & Associates	Ford
12	Derrike Cope	Bobby Allison Motorsports	Ford
14	Richard Brickhouse	Skillen Racing	Chevrolet
15	Dick Trickle	Bud Moore Engineering	Ford
16	Ted Musgrave	Roush Racing	Ford
17	Darrell Waltrip	Darrell Waltrip Motorsports	Chevrolet
18	Bobby Labonte	Joe Gibbs Racing	Chevrolet
19	Loy Allen Jr.	TriStar Motorsports	Ford
21	Morgan Shepherd	Wood Brothers Racing	Ford
22	Ward Burton	Bill Davis Racing	Pontiac
23	Jimmy Spencer	Haas-Carter Motorsports	Ford
24	Jeff Gordon	Hendrick Motorsports	Chevrolet
25	Ken Schrader	Hendrick Motorsports	Chevrolet
26	Hut Stricklin	King Racing	Ford
27	Elton Sawyer	Junior Johnson & Associates	Ford
28	Dale Jarrett	Robert Yates Racing	Ford
29	Steve Grissom	Diamond Ridge Motorsports	Chevrolet
30	Michael Waltrip	Bahari Racing	Pontiac
31	Gary Bradberry	A.G. Dillard Motorsports	Chevrolet
32	Greg Sacks	Active Motorsports	Chevrolet
33	Robert Pressley (R)	Leo Jackson Motorsports	Chevrolet
37	John Andretti	Kranefuss-Haas Racing	Ford
40	Shane Hall	Dick Brooks Racing	Pontiac
41	Ricky Craven (R)	Larry Hedrick Motorsports	Chevrolet
42	Kyle Petty	Team SABCO	Pontiac
43	Bobby Hamilton	Petty Enterprises	Pontiac
70	Alan Russell	Russell Racing	Chevrolet
71	Dave Marcis	Marcis Auto Racing	Chevrolet
75	Todd Bodine	Butch Mock Motorsports	Ford
77	Bobby Hillin Jr.	Jasper Motorsports	Ford
78	Jay Hedgecock	Triad Motorsports	Ford
84	Norm Benning	Norm Benning Racing	Ford
87	Joe Nemechek	NEMCO Motorsports	Chevrolet
88	Ernie Irvan	Robert Yates Racing	Ford
90	Mike Wallace	Donlavey Racing	Ford
94	Bill Elliott	Elliott-Hardy Racing	Ford
98	Jeremy Mayfield	Cale Yarborough Motorsports	Ford

== Qualifying ==
Qualifying was originally scheduled to be split into two rounds. The first round was scheduled to be held on Friday, October 20, at 2:30 PM EST. However, first-round qualifying was rained out and postponed until Saturday, October 21, at 9:30 AM EST. As a result of the rain delay, qualifying was decided to be combined into only one round. For this specific race, positions 1-38 would be decided on time, and depending on who needed it, a select amount of positions were given to cars who had not otherwise qualified but were high enough in owner's points; which was usually four. If needed, a past champion who did not qualify on either time or provisionals could use a champion's provisional, adding one more spot to the field.

Hut Stricklin, driving for King Racing, would win the pole, setting a time of 23.563 and an average speed of 155.379 miles per hour (250.058 km/h).

Seven drivers would fail to qualify.

=== Full qualifying results ===
Pos.	#	Driver	Team	Make	Time	Speed
1	26	Hut Stricklin	King Racing	Ford	23.563	155.379
2	30	Michael Waltrip	Bahari Racing	Pontiac	23.572	155.320
3	22	Ward Burton	Bill Davis Racing	Pontiac	23.575	155.300
4	24	Jeff Gordon	Hendrick Motorsports	Chevrolet	23.591	155.195
5	6	Mark Martin	Roush Racing	Ford	23.592	155.188
6	15	Dick Trickle	Bud Moore Engineering	Ford	23.610	155.070
7	10	Ricky Rudd	Rudd Performance Motorsports	Ford	23.664	154.716
8	17	Darrell Waltrip	Darrell Waltrip Motorsports	Chevrolet	23.670	154.677
9	87	Joe Nemechek	NEMCO Motorsports	Chevrolet	23.671	154.670
10	12	Derrike Cope	Bobby Allison Motorsports	Ford	23.673	154.657
11	21	Morgan Shepherd	Wood Brothers Racing	Ford	23.675	154.644
12	31	Gary Bradberry	A.G. Dillard Motorsports	Chevrolet	23.685	154.579
13	5	Terry Labonte	Hendrick Motorsports	Chevrolet	23.692	154.533
14	37	John Andretti	Kranefuss-Haas Racing	Ford	23.692	154.533
15	42	Kyle Petty	Team SABCO	Pontiac	23.696	154.507
16	1	Rick Mast	Precision Products Racing	Ford	23.706	154.442
17	43	Bobby Hamilton	Petty Enterprises	Pontiac	23.711	154.409
18	2	Rusty Wallace	Penske Racing South	Ford	23.734	154.260
19	98	Jeremy Mayfield	Cale Yarborough Motorsports	Ford	23.744	154.195
20	3	Dale Earnhardt	Richard Childress Racing	Chevrolet	23.764	154.065
21	41	Ricky Craven (R)	Larry Hedrick Motorsports	Chevrolet	23.769	154.033
22	7	Geoff Bodine	Geoff Bodine Racing	Ford	23.790	153.897
23	94	Bill Elliott	Elliott-Hardy Racing	Ford	23.807	153.787
24	25	Ken Schrader	Hendrick Motorsports	Chevrolet	23.807	153.787
25	33	Robert Pressley (R)	Leo Jackson Motorsports	Chevrolet	23.826	153.664
26	77	Bobby Hillin Jr.	Jasper Motorsports	Ford	23.829	153.645
27	28	Dale Jarrett	Robert Yates Racing	Ford	23.907	153.143
28	4	Sterling Marlin	Morgan–McClure Motorsports	Chevrolet	23.913	153.105
29	18	Bobby Labonte	Joe Gibbs Racing	Chevrolet	23.921	153.054
30	90	Mike Wallace	Donlavey Racing	Ford	23.932	152.983
31	29	Steve Grissom	Diamond Ridge Motorsports	Chevrolet	23.947	152.888
32	8	Jeff Burton	Stavola Brothers Racing	Ford	23.954	152.843
33	75	Todd Bodine	Butch Mock Motorsports	Ford	23.978	152.690
34	23	Jimmy Spencer	Travis Carter Enterprises	Ford	23.994	152.588
35	27	Elton Sawyer	Junior Johnson & Associates	Ford	23.995	152.582
36	11	Brett Bodine	Junior Johnson & Associates	Ford	23.998	152.563
37	16	Ted Musgrave	Roush Racing	Ford	24.004	152.525
38	32	Greg Sacks	Active Motorsports	Chevrolet	24.051	152.227
Provisionals
39	9	Lake Speed	Melling Racing	Ford	-*	-*
40	40	Shane Hall	Dick Brooks Racing	Pontiac	-*	-*
Failed to qualify
41	71	Dave Marcis	Marcis Auto Racing	Chevrolet	-*	-*
42	88	Ernie Irvan	Robert Yates Racing	Ford	-*	-*
43	19	Loy Allen Jr.	TriStar Motorsports	Ford	-*	-*
44	78	Jay Hedgecock	Triad Motorsports	Ford	-*	-*
45	84	Norm Benning	Norm Benning Racing	Ford	-*	-*
46	70	Alan Russell	Russell Racing	Chevrolet	-*	-*
47	14	Richard Brickhouse	Skillen Racing	Chevrolet	-*	-*
Official starting lineup

== Race results ==
Fin	St	#	Driver	Team	Make	Laps	Led	Status	Pts	Winnings
1	3	22	Ward Burton	Bill Davis Racing	Pontiac	393	87	running	180	$70,250
2	18	2	Rusty Wallace	Penske Racing South	Ford	393	21	running	175	$50,050
3	5	6	Mark Martin	Roush Racing	Ford	393	2	running	170	$44,850
4	13	5	Terry Labonte	Hendrick Motorsports	Chevrolet	393	0	running	160	$34,925
5	32	8	Jeff Burton	Stavola Brothers Racing	Ford	393	0	running	155	$40,325
6	28	4	Sterling Marlin	Morgan–McClure Motorsports	Chevrolet	393	33	running	155	$27,550
7	20	3	Dale Earnhardt	Richard Childress Racing	Chevrolet	393	39	running	151	$34,050
8	21	41	Ricky Craven (R)	Larry Hedrick Motorsports	Chevrolet	393	0	running	142	$19,650
9	9	87	Joe Nemechek	NEMCO Motorsports	Chevrolet	393	0	running	138	$18,650
10	23	94	Bill Elliott	Elliott-Hardy Racing	Ford	393	0	running	134	$17,650
11	19	98	Jeremy Mayfield	Cale Yarborough Motorsports	Ford	393	6	running	135	$16,950
12	8	17	Darrell Waltrip	Darrell Waltrip Motorsports	Chevrolet	392	1	crash	132	$21,650
13	7	10	Ricky Rudd	Rudd Performance Motorsports	Ford	392	0	running	124	$21,950
14	31	29	Steve Grissom	Diamond Ridge Motorsports	Chevrolet	392	0	running	121	$16,050
15	22	7	Geoff Bodine	Geoff Bodine Racing	Ford	392	0	running	118	$27,450
16	6	15	Dick Trickle	Bud Moore Engineering	Ford	392	0	running	115	$20,450
17	33	75	Todd Bodine	Butch Mock Motorsports	Ford	391	0	running	112	$20,740
18	11	21	Morgan Shepherd	Wood Brothers Racing	Ford	391	0	running	109	$19,850
19	10	12	Derrike Cope	Bobby Allison Motorsports	Ford	391	0	running	106	$17,650
20	4	24	Jeff Gordon	Hendrick Motorsports	Chevrolet	391	57	running	108	$25,550
21	26	77	Bobby Hillin Jr.	Jasper Motorsports	Ford	391	0	running	100	$10,500
22	37	16	Ted Musgrave	Roush Racing	Ford	391	0	running	97	$14,300
23	27	28	Dale Jarrett	Robert Yates Racing	Ford	390	0	running	94	$24,700
24	39	9	Lake Speed	Melling Racing	Ford	390	0	running	91	$13,500
25	14	37	John Andretti	Kranefuss-Haas Racing	Ford	390	0	running	88	$13,500
26	34	23	Jimmy Spencer	Travis Carter Enterprises	Ford	390	0	running	85	$13,100
27	36	11	Brett Bodine	Junior Johnson & Associates	Ford	387	0	running	82	$33,000
28	1	26	Hut Stricklin	King Racing	Ford	386	8	running	84	$21,300
29	25	33	Robert Pressley (R)	Leo Jackson Motorsports	Chevrolet	384	0	running	76	$18,200
30	17	43	Bobby Hamilton	Petty Enterprises	Pontiac	372	0	running	73	$12,600
31	35	27	Elton Sawyer	Junior Johnson & Associates	Ford	357	0	handling	70	$17,400
32	15	42	Kyle Petty	Team SABCO	Pontiac	327	0	crash	67	$21,900
33	24	25	Ken Schrader	Hendrick Motorsports	Chevrolet	321	0	running	64	$14,200
34	16	1	Rick Mast	Precision Products Racing	Ford	257	139	engine	71	$25,100
35	12	31	Gary Bradberry	A.G. Dillard Motorsports	Chevrolet	254	0	crash	58	$9,000
36	40	40	Shane Hall	Dick Brooks Racing	Pontiac	205	0	crash	55	$13,975
37	38	32	Greg Sacks	Active Motorsports	Chevrolet	149	0	oil pump	52	$8,950
38	2	30	Michael Waltrip	Bahari Racing	Pontiac	113	0	crash	49	$14,150
39	30	90	Mike Wallace	Donlavey Racing	Ford	84	0	crash	46	$8,900
40	29	18	Bobby Labonte	Joe Gibbs Racing	Chevrolet	47	0	engine	43	$22,700
Official race results

Previous race: 1995 UAW-GM Quality 500	NASCAR Winston Cup Series; 1995 season	Next race: 1995 Dura Lube 500
