= Jimmy Hensley =

American stock car racing driver

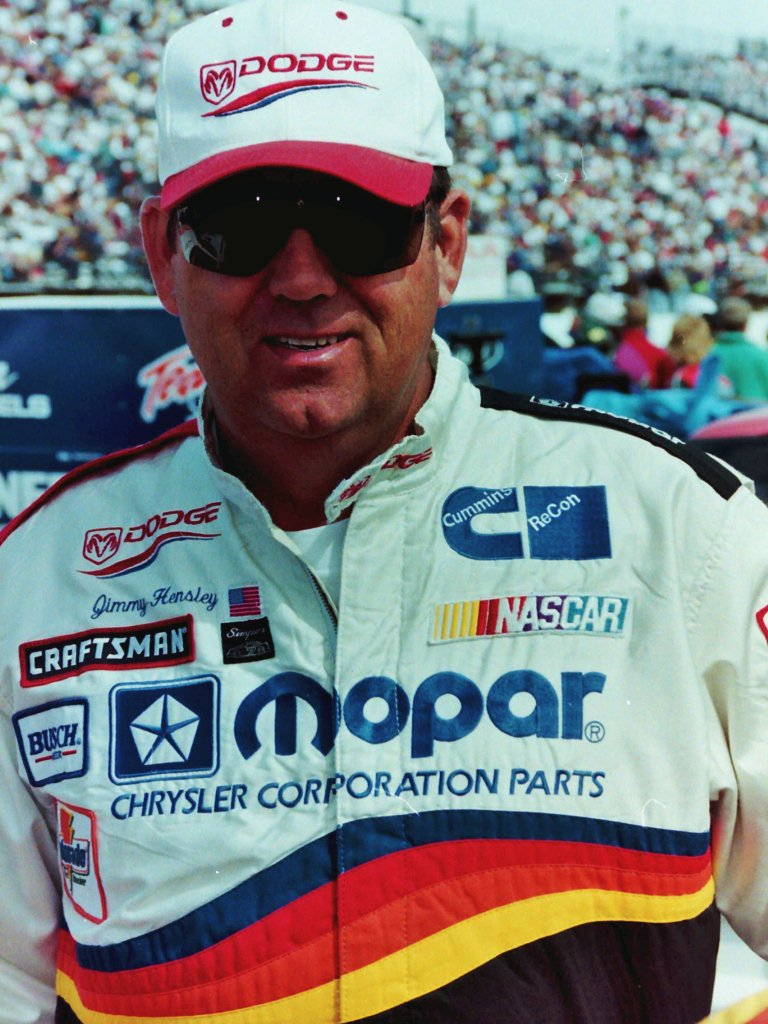
- Hensley in 1996
- Born: James Edward Hensley; October 11, 1945 (age 81); Horsepasture, Virginia, U.S.
- Awards: 1985, 1987 Busch Series Most Popular Driver; 1992 Winston Cup Series Rookie of the Year; 1996 Craftsman Truck Series Most Popular Driver

NASCAR Cup Series career
- 98 races run over 18 years
- Best finish: 28th (1992)
- First race: 1972 Virginia 500 (Martinsville)
- Last race: 1995 UAW-GM Quality 500 (Charlotte)
Wins	Top tens	Poles
0	15	1

NASCAR O'Reilly Auto Parts Series career
- 255 races run over 14 years
- Best finish: 2nd (1985, 1987, 1990)
- First race: 1982 Dogwood 500 (Martinsville)
- Last race: 1995 Detroit Gasket 200 (Michigan)
- First win: 1985 Mountain Dew 400 (Hickory)
- Last win: 1991 Texas Pete 300 (Rougemont)
Wins	Top tens	Poles
9	129	15

NASCAR FedEx Freight Truck Series career
- 146 races run over 7 years
- Best finish: 6th (1998)
- First race: 1995 Pizza Plus 150 (Bristol)
- Last race: 2001 Auto Club 200 (Fontana)
- First win: 1998 Federated Auto Parts 250 (Nashville)
- Last win: 1999 NAPA 250 (Martinsville)
Wins	Top tens	Poles
2	64	4
- Statistics up to date as of March 6, 2012.

James Edward Hensley (born October 11, 1945) is an American former NASCAR driver. With a career spanning 27 seasons in all three of NASCAR's elite divisions, Hensley may be best remembered for his Rookie of the Year award won in 1992, his 15th season in the series, and for his nine career Busch Series wins. He spent most of his career working as an oil truck driver in addition to racing. He was best known as being a substitute driver for many teams.

== Early career ==
Hensley's NASCAR career began in 1972, driving for famous owner Junie Donlavey in the No. 90 Ford. Both of his starts that season came at Martinsville Speedway, the track being just ten miles from Hensley's hometown of Ridgeway, Virginia. Though an engine failure in his first start relegated Hensley to a 33rd place finish, he completed all but seven laps of the fall event, the Old Dominion 500, to finish fifth. This would end up being Hensley's best finish in his 98 career Winston Cup Series races.

Hensley competed again for Donlavey in the 1973 and 1974 Virginia 500 events, coming home in seventh and sixth places, respectively. For the 1974 Old Dominion 500, Hensley drove the No. 02 Chevrolet owned by Russell Large, finishing nineteenth. Beginning in 1975, Hensley drove the No. 63 Chevrolet for part-time owner Billy Moyer, competing in both Martinsville races each year until 1977 and registering a top-ten each season. It would be last Cup race for several years.

== Return to the series ==
In 1981, Hensley returned to the Winston Cup Series, driving in the fall Martinsville event for Cecil Gordon in the No. 24 Buick and bringing home a seventh-place result. Hensley raced in three events the next year—both Martinsville races, along with the September event at Richmond, in D. K. Ulrich's No. 40 Buick. That same year, Hensley also competed in the inaugural Busch Series season, competing in eleven events and recording four top five finishes. Hensley spent the 1983 season out of Cup and in the Busch Series, where in 29 starts, he registered sixteen top-ten finishes.

== Busch Series ==
For the next eight seasons, Hensley competed on-and-off in the Winston Cup Series and raced full-time in the Busch ranks. Behind the wheel of the No. 00 Oldsmobile in 1985, Hensley came home second in points, just 29 points behind champion Jack Ingram, after a season with three wins at Hickory, South Boston, and IRP. Hensley again finished second in points in 1987 driving the No. 5 Advance Auto Parts Buick for Sam Ard, starting and finishing first in the season finale at Martinsville for his only win of the season. Just four races later, Hensley won again at Martinsville in the 1988 Miller Classic.

In 1989, Hensley drove eighteen races in six different cars, recording a pole at Hickory in the No. 70 Dirt Devil Pontiac but finishing no better than sixth. In addition, he won his only career Winston Cup pole at Martinsville Speedway, filling in for Dale Earnhardt, who was unable to make it to the track at that time due to the effects of Hurricane Hugo. Earnhardt would drive the car at the race. The pole gave Hensley a berth in the 1990 Busch Clash, in which he started on the front row but fell back with mechanical issues. Hensley returned to victory lane the next season driving the No. 25 Crown Petroleum/Fast Fare Oldsmobile for Don Beverly, winning at Nazareth Speedway; he followed that up in 1991 with a career-high three victories, winning at Martinsville, Hickory, and Rougemont.

== Return to the Cup Series ==
Hensley started the 1992 with the No. 25 Beverly Racing team, but they were unable to locate permanent sponsorship. They parted ways and Hensley moved to the Cup Series, driving the No. 66 TropArtic Ford Thunderbird for Cale Yarborough. Hensley ran in 22 races with four top-ten finishes with the group, and won Rookie of the Year honors at the age of 47, due to the other competitors that season running part-time schedules.

Hensley began 1993 in the No. 52 NAPA/Hurley Limo Ford for Jimmy Means, running the first three races of the year. He then spent most of the season driving the No. 7 car in place of the deceased Alan Kulwicki per Kulwicki's will. After the team was bought by Geoff Bodine, he drove one race for Richard Petty before closing the season in the No. 4 Eastman Kodak/Morgan-McClure Motorsports Chevrolet.

== Craftsman Truck Series participation ==
Beginning in 1995, Hensley began to compete in the newly formed Craftsman Truck Series, driving in his first two seasons for owner Grier Lackey. His first full season was in the No. 30 Mopar Performance Dodge Ram in 1996, where he had five top-fives and a pole position. In 1997, however, Hensley joined Petty Enterprises, piloting the No. 43 Cummins Dodge in the next three seasons. At the age of 52 in 1998, Hensley found victory lane at Nashville and finished sixth in the final points standings. The next year, he finished first at Martinsville, recording what would be the last win of his career. That year, he made his final run in the Busch Series, filling in for Wayne Grubb.

Hensley was replaced at Petty, and signed with the No. 16 Team Rensi Motorsports Chevrolet Silverado group. With sponsorship coming from Lance Snacks, Mobile Max2, and eLink, he had eight top-ten finishes and finished thirteenth in points. He began 2001 without a ride, but ran a majority of the year filling in for Randy MacDonald in the No. 72 truck. Hensley retired after that season, and now works installing fire-service systems.

== Motorsports career results ==
=== NASCAR ===
(key) (Bold – Pole position awarded by qualifying time. Italics – Pole position earned by points standings or practice time. * – Most laps led.)

==== Winston Cup Series ====
NASCAR Winston Cup Series results
Year	Team	No.	Make	1	2	3	4	5	6	7	8	9	10	11	12	13	14	15	16	17	18	19	20	21	22	23	24	25	26	27	28	29	30	31	NWCC	Pts	Ref
1972	Donlavey Racing	90	Ford	RSD	DAY	RCH	ONT	CAR	ATL	BRI	DAR	NWS	MAR; 33	TAL	CLT	DOV	MCH	RSD	TWS	DAY	BRI	TRN	ATL	TAL	MCH	NSV	DAR	RCH	DOV	MAR; 5	NWS	CLT	CAR	TWS	99th	215.25	
1973	Donlavey Racing	90	Mercury	RSD	DAY	RCH	CAR	BRI	ATL	NWS	DAR	MAR; 7	TAL	NSV	CLT	DOV	TWS	RSD	MCH	DAY	BRI	ATL	TAL	NSV	DAR	RCH	DOV	NWS	MAR	CLT	CAR				103rd	-	
1974	Donlavey Racing	90	Ford	RSD	DAY	RCH	CAR	BRI	ATL	DAR	NWS	MAR; 6	TAL	NSV	DOV	CLT	RSD	MCH	DAY	BRI	NSV	ATL	POC	TAL	MCH	DAR	RCH	DOV	NWS						83rd	4.01	
1974	Russell Large Racing	02	Chevy																											MAR; 19	CLT	CAR	ONT		83rd	4.01	
1975	Moyer Racing	63	Chevy	RSD	DAY	RCH	CAR	BRI	ATL	NWS	DAR	MAR; 7	TAL	NSV	DOV	CLT	RSD	MCH	DAY	NSV	POC	TAL	MCH	DAR	DOV	NWS	MAR; 27	CLT	RCH	CAR	BRI	ATL	ONT		97th	82	
1976	Moyer Racing	63	Chevy	RSD	DAY	CAR	RCH	BRI	ATL	NWS	DAR	MAR; 25	TAL	NSV	DOV	CLT	RSD	MCH	DAY	NSV	POC	TAL	MCH	BRI	DAR	RCH	DOV	MAR; 7	NWS	CLT	CAR	ATL	ONT		68th	234	
1977	Moyer Racing	63	Chevy	RSD	DAY	RCH	CAR	ATL	NWS	DAR	BRI	MAR; 22	TAL	NSV	DOV	CLT	RSD	MCH	DAY	NSV	POC	TAL	MCH	BRI	DAR	RCH	DOV								61st	247	
1977	Hensley Racing	63	Chevy																									MAR; 6	NWS	CLT	CAR	ATL	ONT		61st	247	
1981	Gordon Racing	24	Buick	RSD	DAY	RCH	CAR	ATL	BRI	NWS	DAR	MAR	TAL	NSV	DOV	CLT	TWS	RSD	MCH	DAY	NSV	POC	TAL	MCH	BRI	DAR	RCH	DOV	MAR; 7	NWS	CLT	CAR	ATL	RSD	NA	0	
1982	Ulrich Racing	40	Buick	DAY	RCH	BRI	ATL	CAR	DAR	NWS	MAR; 9	TAL	NSV	DOV	CLT	POC	RSD	MCH	DAY	NSV	POC	TAL	MCH	BRI	DAR	RCH; 29	DOV	NWS	CLT	MAR; 23	CAR	ATL	RSD		NA	0	
1984	Langley Racing	64	Ford	DAY	RCH; 22	CAR	ATL	BRI	NWS	DAR	MAR; 20	TAL	NSV	DOV	CLT	RSD	POC	MCH	DAY	NSV	POC	TAL	MCH	BRI	DAR	RCH; 22	DOV	MAR; 22	CLT	NWS	CAR	ATL	RSD		NA	0	
1986	Langley Racing	64	Ford	DAY	RCH	CAR	ATL	BRI	DAR	NWS	MAR; 23	TAL	DOV	CLT	RSD	POC	MCH	DAY	POC	TAL	GLN	MCH	BRI	DAR	RCH; 16	DOV	MAR; 18	NWS	CLT	CAR	ATL	RSD			54th	318	
1988	Arrington Racing	67	Ford	DAY	RCH	CAR	ATL	DAR	BRI	NWS	MAR; 24	TAL	CLT	DOV	RSD	POC	MCH	DAY	POC	TAL	GLN	MCH	BRI	DAR	RCH	DOV	MAR	CLT	NWS	CAR	PHO	ATL			NA	0	
1989	Richard Childress Racing	3	Chevy	DAY	CAR	ATL	RCH	DAR	BRI	NWS	MAR	TAL	CLT	DOV	SON	POC	MCH	DAY	POC	TAL	GLN	MCH	BRI	DAR	RCH	DOV	**MAR**; QL^{†}	CLT	NWS	CAR	PHO	ATL			NA	-	
1990	Moroso Racing	20	Olds	DAY	RCH	CAR	ATL	DAR	BRI	NWS	MAR	TAL	CLT	DOV	SON	POC	MCH	DAY	POC	TAL	GLN	MCH	BRI	DAR	RCH	DOV	MAR	NWS	CLT; 33	CAR; 31	PHO	ATL			88th	70	
1991	Team III Racing	24	Pontiac	DAY	RCH	CAR	ATL	DAR	BRI	NWS	MAR	TAL	CLT	DOV	SON	POC	MCH	DAY	POC	TAL	GLN	MCH	BRI	DAR	RCH	DOV	MAR; 10	NWS; 11	CLT; 20	CAR; 14	PHO	ATL			41st	488	
1992	Cale Yarborough Motorsports	66	Ford	DAY	CAR	RCH	ATL	DAR	BRI	NWS	MAR; 15	TAL; 25	CLT; 11	DOV; 8	SON; 30	POC; 9	MCH; 29	DAY; 15	POC; 14	TAL; 31	GLN; 26	MCH; 29	BRI; 7	DAR; 15	RCH; 17	DOV; 13	MAR; 17	NWS; 25	CLT; 18	CAR; 18	PHO; 21	ATL; 8			28th	2410	
1993	Jimmy Means Racing	52	Ford	DAY; 40	CAR; 25	RCH; 34	ATL	DAR	BRI																										32nd	2001	
1993	AK Racing	7	Ford							NWS; 12	MAR; 13	TAL; 9	SON	CLT; 15	DOV; 22	POC; 17	MCH; 23	DAY; 34	NHA; 11	POC; 39	TAL; 28	GLN	MCH; 15	BRI; 6	DAR; 23	RCH; 21	DOV								32nd	2001	
1993	Petty Enterprises	44	Pontiac																									MAR; 34	NWS	CLT	CAR				32nd	2001	
1993	Morgan-McClure Motorsports	4	Chevy																													PHO; 32	ATL; 25		32nd	2001	
1994	RaDiUs Motorsports	55	Ford	DAY; 15	CAR; 22	RCH; 36	ATL; 29	DAR; 13	BRI; DNQ	NWS; DNQ	MAR; 23	TAL; 30	SON; DNQ	CLT; DNQ	DOV; 17	POC; 29	MCH; 42	DAY; 32	NHA; 29	POC; DNQ	TAL; 30	IND; 32	GLN; 33	MCH; DNQ	BRI; DNQ	DAR	RCH	DOV	MAR	NWS					41st	1394	
1994	Moroso Racing	20	Ford																												CLT; 40	CAR	PHO		41st	1394	
1994	Charles Hardy Racing	44	Ford																															ATL; 12	41st	1394	
1995	Active Motorsports	32	Chevy	DAY	CAR; 40	RCH; DNQ	ATL; 38	DAR	BRI	NWS	MAR	TAL	SON												BRI; DNQ	DAR	RCH	DOV							44th	558	
1995	Hagan Racing	14	Ford											CLT; DNQ	DOV	POC	MCH																		44th	558	
1995	Bill Davis Racing	22	Pontiac															DAY; 30	NHA; 41	POC; 32	TAL; DNQ	IND; 32	GLN	MCH; 22											44th	558	
1995	A.G. Dillard Motorsports	31	Chevy																										MAR; DNQ	NWS; 29	CLT; 39	CAR	PHO	ATL	44th	558	
1996	Active Motorsports	32	Chevy	DAY	CAR	RCH	ATL	DAR; DNQ	BRI	NWS	MAR	TAL	SON	CLT	DOV	POC	MCH	DAY	NHA	POC	TAL	IND	GLN	MCH	BRI	DAR	RCH	DOV	MAR	NWS	CLT	CAR	PHO	ATL	NA	-	
^{†} - Qualified for Dale Earnhardt

===== Daytona 500 =====
Year	Team	Manufacturer	Start	Finish
1993	Jimmy Means Racing	Ford	38	40
1994	RaDiUs Motorsports	Ford	25	15

==== Busch Series ====
NASCAR Busch Series results
Year	Team	No.	Make	1	2	3	4	5	6	7	8	9	10	11	12	13	14	15	16	17	18	19	20	21	22	23	24	25	26	27	28	29	30	31	32	33	34	35	NBSC	Pts	Ref
1982	HVP Motorsports	63	Pontiac	DAY	RCH	BRI	MAR; 7	DAR	HCY	SBO; 3	CRW; 2	RCH; 17	LGY	DOV	HCY	CLT	ASH	HCY	SBO; 13	CAR	CRW; 4	SBO; 7	HCY	LGY	IRP; 4	BRI	HCY	RCH	MAR; 18	CLT	HCY; 10	MAR; 23							14th	1520	
1983	HVP Motorsports	63	Pontiac	DAY	RCH; 25	CAR	HCY	MAR; 22	NWS	SBO; 6	GPS; 17	LGY; 16	DOV	BRI; 8	CLT	SBO; 15	HCY; 8							HCY; 9		IRP; 9	GPS; 4	BRI; 15	HCY; 12		RCH; 6		SBO; 19	MAR; 6	ROU; 5		HCY; 20	MAR; 5	8th	3716	
1983		55	Pontiac															ROU; 9	SBO; 24	ROU; 6	CRW; 3	ROU; 7	SBO; 23		LGY; 8														8th	3716	
1983	Chubby Arrington	29	Dodge																											DAR; 22									8th	3716	
1983	Whitaker Racing	7	Olds																													NWS; 3							8th	3716	
1983		39	Pontiac																																	CLT; 33			8th	3716	
1984	Cox Racing	50	Mercury	DAY; 33	RCH	CAR	HCY	MAR																															34th	646	
1984	Gibson Racing	90	Pontiac						DAR; 35	ROU	NSV	LGY	MLW	DOV	CLT	SBO	HCY	ROU																					34th	646	
1984	Whitaker Racing	7	Olds																SBO; 4	ROU	HCY	IRP; 7	LGY	SBO; 19	BRI	DAR	RCH	NWS											34th	646	
1984		48	Pontiac																										CLT; 17	HCY	CAR								34th	646	
1984		88	Pontiac																													MAR; 9							34th	646	
1985	Thomas Brothers Racing	00	Olds	DAY; 6	CAR; 8	HCY; 1	BRI; 11	**MAR**; 20	DAR; 5	SBO; 1	LGY; 9	DOV; 19	CLT; 5	**SBO**; 2	HCY; 4	ROU; 4	IRP; 1	**SBO**; 2	LGY; 10	HCY; 5	MLW; 3	BRI; 5	DAR; 4	**RCH**; 8	NWS; 3	ROU; 12	CLT; 10	HCY; 7	CAR; 6	MAR; 3									2nd	4077	
1986	HVP Motorsports	63	Olds	DAY; 18	CAR; 12				DAR; 19				DOV; 14	CLT; 17						RAL; 12							DAR; 12		DOV; 8			CLT; 19	CAR; 6						8th	3914	
1986	HVP Motorsports	63	Pontiac			HCY; 17		BRI; 13									ROU; 11	IRP; 11	SBO; 5		OXF; 13	SBO; 7	HCY; 9	LGY; 13		BRI; 21													8th	3914	
1986	HVP Motorsports	63	Chevy				MAR; 18			SBO; 5	LGY; 25	JFC; 15			SBO; 11	HCY; 18									ROU; 11			RCH; 7		MAR; 6	ROU; 18			MAR; 4*					8th	3914	
1987	Sam Ard Racing	5	Buick	DAY; 20	HCY; 7	MAR; 8	DAR; 17	BRI; 7	LGY; 16	SBO; 4	CLT; 14	DOV; 7	IRP; 21	ROU; 20	JFC; 7	OXF; 22	SBO; 25	HCY; 21	RAL; 4	LGY; 24	ROU; 3	BRI; 2	JFC; 3	DAR; 12	RCH; 8	DOV; 4	MAR; 2	CLT; 14	**CAR**; 23	**MAR**; 1*									2nd	3565	
1988	Sam Ard Racing	5	Buick	DAY; 17	HCY; 7	CAR; 10	MAR; 1	DAR; 12	BRI; 11	LNG; 22	NZH; 5	SBO; 14	NSV; 6	CLT; 18	DOV; 24	ROU; 7	LAN; 2	LVL; 3	MYB; 15	OXF; 28	SBO; 12	HCY; 2*	LNG; 3	IRP; 12	ROU; 22	BRI; 5	DAR; 29	RCH; 6	DOV; 15	MAR; 27	CLT; 7	CAR; 19	MAR; 25						6th	3837	
1989	Linville Racing	62	Chevy	DAY; 33	CAR																																		22nd	1785	
1989	Ryder Racing	27	Pontiac			MAR; 30																																	22nd	1785	
1989		89	Chevy				HCY; 28																																22nd	1785	
1989	Southern Maryland Motorsports	58	Olds					DAR; 40	BRI	NZH	SBO	LAN	NSV																										22nd	1785	
1989	Huffman Racing	70	Buick											CLT; 17	DOV; 33	ROU; 24	LVL; 23	VOL	MYB; 14	SBO; 7	**HCY**; 6	DUB; 18	IRP; 26	ROU; 14	BRI; 15	DAR	RCH; 13	DOV	MAR; 13	CLT	CAR								22nd	1785	
1989	Beverley Racing	55	Olds																													MAR; 32							22nd	1785	
1990	Moroso Racing	25	Olds	DAY; 4	RCH; 17	CAR; 10	MAR; 4	HCY; 11	DAR; 5	BRI; 6	LAN; 9	**SBO**; 4*	NZH; 1	HCY; 19	CLT; 7	DOV; 14	ROU; 14	VOL; 8	MYB; 19		**NHA**; 15	**SBO**; 14	DUB; 3	**IRP**; 11	ROU; 4	BRI; 10	DAR; 5	RCH; 5	DOV; 10	MAR; 7	CLT; 15		CAR; 25	MAR; 24					2nd	4172	
1990	Moroso Racing	28	Olds																	OXF; 18																			2nd	4172	
1990	Moroso Racing	75	Olds																													NHA; 12							2nd	4172	
1991	Beverley Racing	25	Olds	DAY; 39	RCH; 8*	CAR; 10	MAR; 1*	VOL; 4	**HCY**; 2*	**DAR**; 6	BRI; 23	LAN; 16	SBO; 21	**NZH**; 9	CLT; 4	DOV; 7	ROU; 2	HCY; 1	MYB; 11	GLN; 21	OXF; 13	**NHA**; 32	SBO; 9	DUB; 7	IRP; 17	ROU; 1	BRI; 5	DAR; 31	RCH; 14	DOV; 25	CLT; 3		CAR; 38	MAR; 10					5th	3916	
1991	Beverley Racing	5	Olds																													NHA; 37							5th	3916	
1992	Beverley Racing	25	Olds	DAY; 27	CAR; 14	RCH; 7	ATL	MAR; 8	DAR	BRI; 7	HCY; 8	LAN	DUB	NZH; 5	CLT	DOV	ROU	MYB	GLN	VOL	NHA; 7	TAL	IRP	ROU	MCH	NHA	BRI	DAR	RCH	DOV	CLT	MAR	CAR	HCY					39th	1080	
1993	Morgan-McClure Motorsports	4	Chevy	DAY	CAR	RCH	DAR	BRI	HCY	ROU	MAR	NZH	CLT	DOV	MYB	GLN	MLW	TAL	IRP	MCH	NHA	BRI	DAR	RCH	DOV	ROU	CLT; 42												69th	197	
1993	Henderson Motorsports	75	Olds																									MAR; 4	CAR	HCY	ATL								69th	197	
1994	Moroso Racing	20	Chevy	DAY	CAR	RCH	ATL	MAR	DAR	HCY	BRI	ROU	NHA	NZH	CLT	DOV	MYB	GLN	MLW	SBO	TAL	HCY	IRP	MCH	BRI	DAR	RCH	DOV	CLT; 9	MAR									70th	214	
1994	Laughlin Racing Products	35	Chevy																												CAR; 29								70th	214	
1995	Laughlin Racing Products	35	Ford	DAY	CAR	RCH	ATL	NSV	DAR	BRI	HCY	NHA	NZH	CLT	DOV	MYB	GLN	MLW	TAL	SBO	IRP	MCH; 35	BRI	DAR	RCH	DOV	CLT	CAR	HOM										105th	58	
1999	Grubb Motorsports	83	Chevy	DAY	CAR	LVS	ATL	DAR	TEX	NSV	BRI	TAL	CAL	NHA	RCH	NZH	CLT	DOV	SBO	GLN	MLW	MYB	PPR	GTY	IRP	MCH	BRI	DAR	RCH	DOV	CLT	CAR; DNQ	MEM	PHO; DNQ	HOM				NA	-	

==== Craftsman Truck Series ====
NASCAR Craftsman Truck Series results
Year	Team	No.	Make	1	2	3	4	5	6	7	8	9	10	11	12	13	14	15	16	17	18	19	20	21	22	23	24	25	26	27	NCTC	Pts	Ref
1995	Grandaddy Racing	30	Dodge	PHO	TUS	SGS	MMR	POR	EVG	I70	LVL	BRI; 25	MLW	CNS	HPT	IRP	FLM	RCH	MAR	NWS; 18	SON	MMR	PHO; 30								55th	270	
1996	Grandaddy Racing	30	Dodge	HOM; 26	PHO; 27	POR; 10	EVG; 7	TUS; 4	CNS; 3	HPT; 28	BRI; 25	**NZH**; 2*	MLW; 4	LVL; 3	I70; 8	IRP; 25	FLM; 9	GLN; 8	NSV; 8	RCH; 13	NHA; 9	MAR; 9	NWS; 16	SON; 10	MMR; 18	PHO; 30	LVS; 17				8th	3029	
1997	Petty Enterprises	43	Dodge	WDW; 6	TUS; 8	HOM; 13	PHO; 14	POR; 11	EVG; 25	I70; 2	NHA; 23	TEX; 12	BRI; 8	NZH; 25	MLW; 8	**LVL**; 3	CNS; 8	HPT; 7	**IRP**; 3*	FLM; 13	NSV; 15	GLN; 6	RCH; 13	MAR; 4	SON; 6	MMR; 9	CAL; 34	PHO; 19	LVS; 15		8th	3385	
1998	Petty Enterprises	43	Dodge	WDW; 14	HOM; 28	PHO; 14	POR; 12	EVG; 19	I70; 24	GLN; 31	TEX; 33	BRI; 9	MLW; 2	NZH; 6	CAL; 20	PPR; 5	IRP; 14	NHA; 6	FLM; 5	NSV; 1	HPT; 3	LVL; 7	RCH; 16	MEM; 3	GTY; 6	MAR; 2	SON; 5	MMR; 21	PHO; 9	LVS; 3	6th	3570	
1999	Petty Enterprises	43	Dodge	HOM; 29	PHO; 7	EVG; 21	MMR; 5	MAR; 1	MEM; 30	PPR; 5	I70; 5*	BRI; 12	TEX; 8	PIR; 23	GLN; 23	MLW; 12	NSV; 3	NZH; 9	MCH; 3	NHA; 9	IRP; 30	GTY; 10	HPT; 14	RCH; 15	LVS; 7	**LVL**; 3*	TEX; 14	CAL; 8			10th	3280	
2000	Team Rensi Motorsports	16	Chevy	DAY; 29	HOM; 12	PHO; 15	MMR; 14	MAR; 10	PIR; 6	GTY; 2	MEM; 10	PPR; 11	EVG; 12	TEX; 12	KEN; 13	GLN; 14	MLW; 12	NHA; 27	NZH; 7	MCH; 12	IRP; 9	NSV; 29	CIC; 25	RCH; 13	DOV; 32	TEX; 4	CAL; 10				13th	2933	
2001	MacDonald Motorsports	72	Chevy	DAY	HOM	MMR	MAR; 25	GTY; 13	DAR; 33	PPR; 14	DOV; 26	TEX; 32	MEM; 15	MLW; 26	KAN	KEN; 13	NHA	IRP	NSH	CIC; 25				TEX; 14							20th	1708	
2001	MacDonald Motorsports	72	Dodge																		NZH; 14	RCH; 16	SBO; 25		LVS; 15	PHO; 20	CAL; 30				20th	1708	

=== ARCA Talladega SuperCar Series ===
(key) (Bold – Pole position awarded by qualifying time. Italics – Pole position earned by points standings or practice time. * – Most laps led.)

ARCA Talladega SuperCar Series results
Year	Team	No.	Make	1	2	3	4	5	6	7	8	9	10	11	12	13	14	ATSC	Pts	Ref
1985	Thomas Brothers Racing	00	Olds	ATL	DAY	ATL	TAL	ATL	SSP	IRP; 1	CSP	FRS	IRP	OEF	ISF	DSF	TOL	93rd	-	

Preceded by Bobby Hamilton	NASCAR Winston Cup Series Rookie of the Year; 1992	Succeeded by Jeff Gordon
