= A.G. Dillard Motorsports =

Racing team

- Owner(s): Alan G. Dillard
- Base: Charlottesville, Virginia
- Series: Winston Cup, Busch Grand National Series
- Race drivers: Bobby Allison, Donnie Allison, Gary Bradberry, Ward Burton, Jimmy Hensley, Rick Mast, Patty Moise, Greg Sacks, Elton Sawyer
- Manufacturer: Buick, Chevrolet, Oldsmobile, Pontiac
- Opened: 1982
- Closed: 1996

A.G. Dillard Motorsports was a NASCAR Winston Cup series team owned by Virginian Alan G. Dillard. This team is most notable for giving future Daytona 500 and Southern 500 champion Ward Burton his start in Winston Cup.

== History ==
A.G. Dillard Motorsports was first started up in 1982 racing in the inaugural Budweiser Late Model Sportsman Series (now the NASCAR Xfinity Series). In their first race with Rick Mast, the team finished 3rd. The team raced for only 12 more times that season. Over the next couple of years, The Allison's Bobby Allison and his brother Donnie Allison raced part-time for Dillard with Rick Mast during the 1983 and 1984 seasons. The team got their first win at Dover in 1987 with Rick Mast. The team won the next race as well at Martinsville Speedway. The team won a total of 13 races in The Busch Series overall. Mostly coming with Ward Burton. he won 3 races in the 1993 campaign and finished 6th in the final standings. The team decided to jump to the Winston Cup series with Hardee's sponsorship with associate backing from Coca-Cola and Minute Maid to help the young Virginian rookie on his rookie year. The team got to a rocky start when they failed to qualify for the first two races, the team made its first race at Richmond where Ward finished 35th after a piston failed on lap 71 of the 400 miler. The team failed to qualify 5 times that year. The team's lone highlight of the year was Ward stealing the pole at the Mello Yello 500 at Charlotte Motor Speedway. In 1995, the team remained the same, After Ward recorded a best finish of 6th for the team at Michigan in August, Ward was released by the Dillard operation the next day, and went to the Bill Davis Racing team, piloting the 22 MBNA Pontiac, where he would later score his first win at Rockingham. The team finished off the year with several drivers including Greg Sacks, Jimmy Hensley, and finally Gary Bradberry who raced in the team's last race. The Hardee's sponsorship left to become an associate sponsor of Mark Martin in 1996 and Dillard shut down his operation shortly into 1996 after not finding a sponsor. Sold the team to Dean Monroe for Stacy Compton to drive renumbered No.46 Chevy.

== Motorsports career results ==
=== Winston Cup ===
(key) (Bold – Pole position awarded by qualifying time. Italics – Pole position earned by points standings or practice time. * – Most laps led.)

==== Car No. 31 results ====
| Year | Driver | No. | Make | 1 | 2 | 3 | 4 | 5 | 6 | 7 | 8 | 9 | 10 | 11 | 12 | 13 | 14 | 15 | 16 | 17 | 18 | 19 | 20 | 21 | 22 | 23 | 24 | 25 | 26 | 27 | 28 | 29 | 30 | 31 | NWCC | Pts |
|---|---|---|---|---|---|---|---|---|---|---|---|---|---|---|---|---|---|---|---|---|---|---|---|---|---|---|---|---|---|---|---|---|---|---|---|---|
| 1994 | Ward Burton | 31 | Chevy | DAY; DNQ | CAR; DNQ | RCH; 35 | ATL; 40 | DAR; 21 | BRI; 25 | NWS; DNQ | MAR; 16 | TAL; DNQ | SON; 36 | CLT; 37 | DOV; 37 | POC; 42 | MCH; 29 | DAY; 36 | NHA; 42 | POC; 2 | TAL; DNQ | IND; 31 | GLN; 24 | MCH; 29 | BRI; 36 | DAR; 34 | RCH; 25 | DOV; 27 | MAR; 35 | NWS; 18 | **CLT**; 41 | CAR; 9 | PHO; 21 | ATL; 41 | 36th | 1971 |
| 1995 | Ward Burton | 31 | Chevy | DAY; 15 | CAR; 9 | RCH; 22 | ATL; DNQ | DAR; 25 | BRI; 21 | NWS; 24 | MAR; 25 | TAL; 32 | SON; 21 | CLT; 41 | DOV; 38 | POC; 19 | MCH; 18 | DAY; 35 | NHA; 39 | POC; 11 | TAL; 20 | IND; 35 | GLN; 19 | MCH; 6 | | | | | | | | | | | 35th | 2292 |
| 1995 | Greg Sacks | 31 | Chevy | | | | | | | | | | | | | | | | | | | | | | BRI; 25 | DAR; 38 | RCH; 37 | DOV; DNQ | | | | | | | 35th | 2292 |
| 1995 | Jimmy Hensley | 31 | Chevy | | | | | | | | | | | | | | | | | | | | | | | | | | MAR; DNQ | NWS; 29 | CLT; 39 | | | | 35th | 2292 |
| 1995 | Gary Bradberry | 31 | Chevy | | | | | | | | | | | | | | | | | | | | | | | | | | | | | CAR; 35 | PHO | ATL; 29 | 35th | 2292 |

=== Busch Grand National ===
(key) (Bold – Pole position awarded by qualifying time. Italics – Pole position earned by points standings or practice time. * – Most laps led.)

==== Car No. 2 results ====
| Year | Driver | No. | Make | 1 | 2 | 3 | 4 | 5 | 6 | 7 | 8 | 9 | 10 | 11 | 12 | 13 | 14 | 15 | 16 | 17 | 18 | 19 | 20 | 21 | 22 | 23 | 24 | 25 | 26 | 27 | 28 | 29 | 30 | 31 | NBGNC | Pts |
|---|---|---|---|---|---|---|---|---|---|---|---|---|---|---|---|---|---|---|---|---|---|---|---|---|---|---|---|---|---|---|---|---|---|---|---|---|
| 1985 | Rick Mast | 2 | Pontiac | DAY; 32 | | | | | | | | | | | | | | | | | | | | | | | | | | | | | | | | |
| 1985 | Rick Mast | 44 | Pontiac | | CAR; 20 | HCY | BRI | MAR | DAR; 8 | SBO | LGY | DOV; 4 | CLT; 6 | SBO | HCY | ROU | IRP | SBO | LGY | HCY | MLW | BRI | DAR; 7 | RCH | NWS | ROU | CLT; 8 | HCY | CAR; 7 | MAR | | | | | | |
| 1990 | Elton Sawyer | 41 | Buick | DAY; 5 | RCH | | | | | | | | | | | | | | | | | | | | | | | | | | | | | | | |
| 1990 | Elton Sawyer | 27 | Buick | | | CAR; 19 | MAR; 2 | HCY; 10 | DAR; 27 | BRI; 30 | LAN; 27 | SBO; 10 | NZH; 14 | HCY; 23 | CLT; 19 | DOV; 9 | ROU; 17 | VOL; 2 | MYB; 22 | OXF; 29 | NHA; 25 | SBO; 24 | DUB; 28 | IRP; 6 | ROU; 5 | BRI; 31 | DAR; 41 | RCH; 12 | DOV; 25 | MAR; 18 | CLT; 34 | NHA; 6 | CAR; 13 | MAR; 15 | | |
| 1991 | Elton Sawyer | 27 | Buick | DAY; 15 | RCH; 26 | CAR; 25 | **MAR**; 5 | VOL; 12 | HCY; 12 | DAR; 29 | BRI; 27 | LAN; 11 | SBO; 7 | NZH; 11 | CLT; 38 | DOV; 23 | ROU; 23 | | | | | | | | | | | | | | | | | | | |
| 1991 | Ward Burton | 27 | Buick | | | | | | | | | | | | | | | HCY; 15 | MYB; 8 | GLN; 22 | OXF; 14 | NHA; 34 | SBO; 18 | DUB; 26 | **IRP**; 26 | ROU; 17 | BRI; 15 | DAR; 36 | RCH; 9 | DOV; 3 | **CLT**; 12* | NHA; 22 | CAR; 24 | MAR; 6 | | |
| 1992 | Ward Burton | 27 | Chevy | DAY; 3 | | | | | | | | | | | | | | | | | | TAL; 30 | | | MCH; 28 | | | | | | | | | | | |
| 1992 | Ward Burton | 27 | Buick | | CAR; 1 | RCH; 27 | ATL; 37 | MAR; 19 | DAR; 7 | BRI; 18 | HCY; 7 | LAN; 21 | DUB; 9 | NZH; 17 | CLT; 6 | DOV; 6 | ROU; 12 | MYB; 7 | GLN; 15 | VOL; 19 | NHA; 22 | | IRP; 13 | ROU; 8 | | NHA; 39 | BRI; 5 | DAR; 11 | RCH; 11 | DOV; 21 | CLT; 16 | MAR; 16 | CAR; 18 | HCY; 21 | | |
| 1993 | Ward Burton | 2 | Chevy | DAY; 21 | | | | | | | | | CLT; 11 | | | GLN; 3 | | TAL; 22 | IRP; 4 | MCH; 24 | NHA; 25 | | DAR; 23 | | DOV; 30 | ROU; 25 | CLT; 7 | | **CAR**; 2 | | ATL; 1* | | | | | |
| 1993 | Ward Burton | 2 | Buick | | CAR; 24 | RCH; 32 | DAR; 4 | **BRI**; 17 | HCY; 16 | ROU; 1* | MAR; 1* | NZH; 3* | | **DOV**; 35 | **MYB**; 2 | | MLW; 19 | | | | | BRI; 24 | | RCH; 22 | | | | MAR; 17 | | HCY; 12 | | | | | | |

==== Car No. 22 results ====
| Year | Driver | No. | Make | 1 | 2 | 3 | 4 | 5 | 6 | 7 | 8 | 9 | 10 | 11 | 12 | 13 | 14 | 15 | 16 | 17 | 18 | 19 | 20 | 21 | 22 | 23 | 24 | 25 | 26 | 27 | 28 | 29 | 30 | 31 | 32 | 33 | 34 | 35 | NBGNC | Pts |
|---|---|---|---|---|---|---|---|---|---|---|---|---|---|---|---|---|---|---|---|---|---|---|---|---|---|---|---|---|---|---|---|---|---|---|---|---|---|---|---|---|
| 1982 | Rick Mast | 22 | Pontiac | DAY | RCH; 3 | BRI | MAR; 22 | DAR | HCY | SBO; 17 | CRW | RCH | LGY | DOV | HCY | CLT | ASH | HCY | SBO; 5 | CAR | CRW | SBO | HCY | LGY | IRP; 7 | BRI; 11 | HCY; 12 | RCH; 8 | MAR; 19 | | HCY; 22 | MAR; 30 | | | | | | | | |
| 1982 | Rick Mast | 22 | Plymouth | | | | | | | | | | | | | | | | | | | | | | | | | | | CLT; DNQ | | | | | | | | | | |
| 1983 | Rick Mast | 22 | Pontiac | DAY | RCH; 19 | CAR | HCY; 18 | MAR; 35 | NWS; 21 | SBO; 19 | GPS; 20 | LGY; 10 | | BRI; 4 | | SBO; 4 | HCY | ROU; 16 | SBO; 19 | ROU | CRW | ROU | SBO; 7 | HCY | LGY | IRP; 11 | GPS | BRI; 5 | HCY | | RCH; 17 | NWS | SBO; 18 | MAR; 10 | ROU; 6 | | HCY; 15 | MAR; 25 | | |
| 1983 | Bobby Allison | 22 | Pontiac | | | | | | | | | | DOV; 2* | | | | | | | | | | | | | | | | | DAR; 37 | | | | | | | | | | |
| 1983 | Bobby Allison | 22 | Olds | | | | | | | | | | | | CLT; 5 | | | | | | | | | | | | | | | | | | | | | CLT; 4 | | | | |
| 1984 | Bobby Allison | 22 | Olds | DAY; 5 | RCH | CAR; 32 | HCY | MAR | DAR; 3 | ROU | NSV | LGY | MLW; 4 | DOV; 6 | CLT | SBO | HCY | ROU | SBO | ROU | HCY | IRP | LGY | SBO | BRI | DAR; 24 | RCH | NWS | | | CAR; 31 | MAR | | | | | | | | |
| 1984 | Donnie Allison | 22 | Olds | | | | | | | | | | | | | | | | | | | | | | | | | | CLT; 8 | HCY | | | | | | | | | | |
| 1985 | Bobby Allison | 22 | Buick | DAY; 2 | CAR; 27 | | | | DAR; 30 | | | DOV; 26 | CLT; 8 | | | | | | | | | | | | | | CLT; 38 | | CAR; 30 | | | | | | | | | | | |
| 1985 | Rick Mast | 22 | Pontiac | | | HCY; 15 | BRI; 2 | MAR; 2 | | SBO; 15 | LGY; 11 | | | SBO; 5 | HCY; 12 | ROU; 12 | IRP; 6 | SBO; 6 | LGY; 8 | HCY; 16 | MLW; 2 | BRI; 6 | DAR | RCH; 12 | NWS; 18 | ROU; 9 | | HCY; 21 | | MAR; 32 | | | | | | | | | | |
| 1986 | Rick Mast | 22 | Pontiac | DAY; 7 | CAR; 4 | HCY; 10 | MAR; 10 | BRI; 23 | DAR; 26 | SBO; 14 | LGY; 12 | JFC; 8 | DOV; 30 | CLT; 34 | | | | | | RAL; 10 | | SBO; 16 | HCY; 10 | LGY; 22 | | | DAR; 28 | RCH; 21 | DOV; 18 | | ROU; 14 | CLT; 13 | CAR; 8 | MAR; 26 | | | | | | |
| 1986 | Rick Mast | 22 | Chevy | | | | | | | | | | | | SBO; 25 | HCY; 9 | ROU; 9 | IRP; 13 | SBO; 19 | | OXF; 23 | | | | ROU; 4 | BRI; 6 | | | | MAR; 10 | | | | | | | | | | |
| 1987 | Rick Mast | 22 | Pontiac | DAY; 9 | HCY; 26 | MAR; 3 | DAR; 22 | BRI; 11 | LGY; 9 | SBO; 22 | CLT; 19 | | IRP; 9 | ROU; 26 | JFC; 25 | OXF; 43 | SBO; 12 | HCY; 18 | RAL; 25 | LGY; 14 | ROU; 15 | BRI; 3 | JFC; 20 | | RCH; 20 | | MAR; 1 | | | MAR; 11 | | | | | | | | | | |
| 1987 | Rick Mast | 22 | Buick | | | | | | | | | **DOV**; 21 | | | | | | | | | | | | DAR; 6 | | DOV; 1 | | CLT; 18 | CAR; 8 | | | | | | | | | | | |
| 1988 | Rick Mast | 22 | Buick | DAY; 10 | HCY; 15 | CAR; 7 | MAR; 7 | DAR; 33 | BRI; 9 | LNG; 11 | NZH; 1 | SBO; 10 | NSV; 13 | CLT; 21 | DOV; 23 | ROU; 14 | LAN; 12 | LVL; 21 | MYB; 6 | OXF; 13 | SBO; 5 | HCY; 8 | LNG; 5 | IRP; 18 | ROU; 1* | BRI; 17 | DAR; 12 | RCH; 25 | DOV; 21 | MAR; 6 | CLT; 25 | CAR; 27 | MAR; 5 | | | | | | | |
| 1989 | Rick Mast | 22 | Buick | DAY; 27 | CAR; 36 | MAR; 31 | HCY; 7 | DAR; 13 | BRI; 3 | NZH; 12 | SBO; 5 | LAN; 7 | NSV; 1 | CLT; 5 | DOV; 19 | ROU; 3 | LVL; 19 | VOL; 7 | **MYB**; 17 | SBO; 19 | HCY; 4 | DUB; 1 | IRP; 35 | ROU; 4 | BRI; 3 | DAR; 24 | RCH; 27 | DOV; 7 | MAR; 23 | CLT; 30 | CAR; 13 | **MAR**; 28 | | | | | | | | |
| 1990 | Rick Mast | 22 | Buick | DAY; 27 | RCH; 32 | CAR; 25 | MAR; 14 | HCY; 18 | DAR; 14 | BRI; 12 | LAN; 25 | SBO; 5 | NZH; 15 | HCY; 8 | CLT; 32 | DOV; 34 | ROU; 12 | VOL; 29 | MYB; 12 | OXF; 4 | NHA; 5 | SBO; 4 | DUB; 19 | IRP; 30 | ROU; 10 | BRI; 1 | DAR; 27 | RCH; 1 | DOV; 2 | **MAR**; 25 | CLT; 23 | NHA; 1* | CAR; 17 | MAR; 32 | | | | | | |
| 1991 | Patty Moise | 42 | Buick | DAY; DNQ | RCH | CAR; 22 | MAR | VOL | HCY | DAR | BRI | LAN | SBO | NZH | CLT | DOV | ROU; 28 | HCY | MYB | GLN; 20 | OXF | NHA | SBO | DUB | IRP | ROU; 22 | BRI | DAR | RCH | DOV; 15 | CLT | NHA | CAR | MAR | | | | | | |
