= 1999 Goody's Headache Powder 500 =

Auto race held at Bristol Motor Speedway in 1999

Race details
- Race 23 of 34 in the 1999 NASCAR Winston Cup Series
- Map of the Bristol Motor Speedway
- Date: August 28, 1999
- Location: Bristol Motor Speedway, Bristol, Tennessee
- Course: Permanent racing facility
- Course length: 0.5 miles (0.8 km)
- Distance: 500 laps, 266.5 mi (428.89 km)
- Weather: Very hot with temperatures of 84.2 °F (29.0 °C); wind speeds of 6 miles per hour (9.7 km/h)
- Average speed: 91.276 miles per hour (146.894 km/h)
- Attendance: 140,000

Pole position
Driver	Tony Stewart	Joe Gibbs Racing
- Time: 124.589 miles per hour (200.507 km/h)

Most laps led
Driver	Tony Stewart	Joe Gibbs Racing
- Laps: 225

Winner
No. 3	Dale Earnhardt	Richard Childress Racing

Television in the United States
- Network: ESPN
- Announcers: Play-by-play: Bob Jenkins; Color: Benny Parsons; Color: Ned Jarrett; Pits: Jerry Punch; Pits: John Kernan; Pits: Bill Weber
- Nielsen ratings: N/A

The 1999 Goody's Headache Powder 500 was a NASCAR Winston Cup Series racing event that took place August 28, 1999, at Bristol Motor Speedway in Bristol, Tennessee.

The race was the 23rd of the 1999 NASCAR Winston Cup Series season. The pole position was held by Joe Gibbs Racing's Tony Stewart, who also led the most laps with 225. The race winner was Dale Earnhardt of Richard Childress Racing, who started 26th, the lowest starting position for a winner at Bristol.

== Race report ==
The early part of the race was primarily dominated by Tony Stewart. On lap 410, the caution flew after Dave Marcis' car stopped against the turn-2 wall. Upon the caution flag-waving, Marcis proceeded to drive away, and as Marcis was frequently aided by Richard Childress Racing, suspicions arose over whether or not Marcis intentionally caused a caution. NASCAR then penalized Marcis, and made him stay in pit road for a lap; NASCAR stated that Marcis claimed he could not reach pit road, and had to stop. However, NASCAR said Marcis had a chance to reach pit road on the two laps he was driving slowly before stopping. On the restart, Terry Labonte led the race, and on lap 435, Earnhardt passed Labonte for the lead. However, Labonte then passed Earnhardt with 57 laps left, but on lap 490, Labonte slowed down and was spun by Darrell Waltrip, giving the lead back to Earnhardt.

Labonte then pitted for new tires, and eventually, with five laps remaining, Labonte contested Earnhardt for the lead, setting up the finish. Terry Labonte was leading on the last lap, but he was spun by Earnhardt in turn 2, and Earnhardt secured his ninth victory at Bristol. Jimmy Spencer finished second, followed by Ricky Rudd, Jeff Gordon, and Stewart. Labonte finished in 8th, and one lap down. Earnhardt's victory was subsequently met by boos and obscene gestures from the crowd. NASCAR officials reviewed the pass but decided to let Earnhardt keep the victory. Earnhardt later stated, "I didn’t mean to wreck him, I just wanted to rattle his cage a bit."

A similar incident between Earnhardt and Labonte had occurred four years prior, at the 1995 Goody's 500; Earnhardt turned Labonte sideways, and Labonte was pushed by Earnhardt past the finish line sideways, giving Labonte the win.

=== Top 10 finishers ===
Pos	Grid	No.	Driver	Manufacturer	Laps	Laps led	Points	Time/Status
1	26	3	Dale Earnhardt	Chevrolet	500	46	180	2:55:11
2	24	23	Jimmy Spencer	Ford	500	0	170	+0.189 seconds
3	35	10	Ricky Rudd	Ford	500	0	165	Flagged
4	4	24	Jeff Gordon	Chevrolet	500	48	165	Flagged
5	1	20	Tony Stewart	Pontiac	500	225	165	Flagged
6	7	6	Mark Martin	Ford	500	0	150	Flagged
7	10	40	Sterling Marlin	Chevrolet	500	0	146	Flagged
8	9	5	Terry Labonte	Chevrolet	499	115	147	Crash damage
9	5	22	Ward Burton	Pontiac	499	0	138	-1 Lap
10	13	33	Ken Schrader	Chevrolet	499	0	134	-1 Lap

=== Standings after the race ===
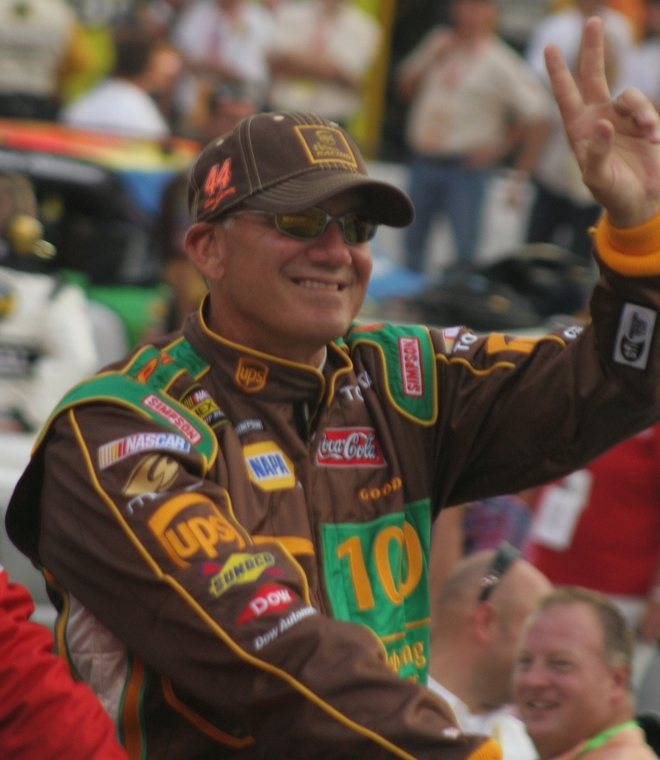
Dale Jarrett led the points standings after the race.

Pos	Driver	Points	Difference
1	Dale Jarrett	3573	0
2	Mark Martin	3360	-213
3	Bobby Labonte	3262	-311
4	Jeff Gordon	3222	-351
5	Tony Stewart	3196	-377
6	Jeff Burton	3107	-466
7	Dale Earnhardt	3044	-529
8	Rusty Wallace	2740	-833
9 ▲	Terry Labonte	2740	-833
10	Mike Skinner	2660	-913
