= 2001 Pontiac Excitement 400 =

11th race of the 2001 NASCAR Winston Cup Series

Race details
- Race 11 of 36 in the 2001 NASCAR Winston Cup Series
- The 2001 Pontiac Excitement 400 program cover, with artwork by Garry Hill.
- Date: May 5, 2001
- Official name: 47th Annual Pontiac Excitement 400
- Location: Richmond, Virginia, Richmond International Raceway
- Course: Permanent racing facility
- Course length: 0.750 miles (1.207 km)
- Distance: 400 laps, 300 mi (482.803 km)
- Scheduled distance: 400 laps, 300 mi (482.803 km)
- Average speed: 95.872 miles per hour (154.291 km/h)

Pole position
Driver	Mark Martin	Roush Racing
- Time: 21.667

Most laps led
Driver	Rusty Wallace	Penske Racing South
- Laps: 276

Winner
No. 20	Tony Stewart	Joe Gibbs Racing

Television in the United States
- Network: FX
- Announcers: Mike Joy, Larry McReynolds, Darrell Waltrip

Radio in the United States
- Radio: Motor Racing Network

The 2001 Pontiac Excitement 400 was the 11th stock car race of the 2001 NASCAR Winston Cup Series and the 47th iteration of the event. The race was held on Saturday, May 5, 2001, in Richmond, Virginia, at Richmond International Raceway, a 0.750 mi (1.207 km) D-shaped oval. The race took the scheduled 400 laps to complete. At race's end, Tony Stewart, driving for Joe Gibbs Racing, would hold off the field on the final restart with two to go to win his 10th career NASCAR Winston Cup Series win and his first of the season. To fill out the podium, Jeff Gordon, driving for Hendrick Motorsports, and Rusty Wallace, driving for Penske Racing South, would finish 2nd and 3rd, respectively.

== Background ==
The layout of Richmond International Raceway, the venue where the race was at.

Richmond International Raceway (RIR) is a 0.750 mi (1.207 km), D-shaped, asphalt race track located just outside Richmond, Virginia in Henrico County.

=== Entry list ===
- (R) denotes rookie driver.

#	Driver	Team	Make
1	Steve Park	Dale Earnhardt, Inc.	Chevrolet
01	Jason Leffler (R)	Chip Ganassi Racing with Felix Sabates	Dodge
2	Rusty Wallace	Penske Racing South	Ford
4	Kevin Lepage	Morgan–McClure Motorsports	Chevrolet
5	Terry Labonte	Hendrick Motorsports	Chevrolet
6	Mark Martin	Roush Racing	Ford
7	Mike Wallace	Ultra Motorsports	Ford
8	Dale Earnhardt Jr.	Dale Earnhardt, Inc.	Chevrolet
9	Bill Elliott	Evernham Motorsports	Dodge
10	Johnny Benson Jr.	MBV Motorsports	Pontiac
11	Brett Bodine	Brett Bodine Racing	Ford
12	Jeremy Mayfield	Penske Racing South	Ford
13	Hermie Sadler	SCORE Motorsports	Chevrolet
14	Ron Hornaday Jr. (R)	A. J. Foyt Enterprises	Pontiac
15	Michael Waltrip	Dale Earnhardt, Inc.	Chevrolet
17	Matt Kenseth	Roush Racing	Ford
18	Bobby Labonte	Joe Gibbs Racing	Pontiac
19	Casey Atwood (R)	Evernham Motorsports	Dodge
20	Tony Stewart	Joe Gibbs Racing	Pontiac
21	Elliott Sadler	Wood Brothers Racing	Ford
22	Ward Burton	Bill Davis Racing	Dodge
24	Jeff Gordon	Hendrick Motorsports	Chevrolet
25	Jerry Nadeau	Hendrick Motorsports	Chevrolet
26	Jimmy Spencer	Haas-Carter Motorsports	Ford
27	Kenny Wallace	Eel River Racing	Pontiac
28	Ricky Rudd	Robert Yates Racing	Ford
29	Kevin Harvick (R)	Richard Childress Racing	Chevrolet
31	Mike Skinner	Richard Childress Racing	Chevrolet
32	Ricky Craven	PPI Motorsports	Ford
33	Joe Nemechek	Andy Petree Racing	Chevrolet
36	Ken Schrader	MBV Motorsports	Pontiac
40	Sterling Marlin	Chip Ganassi Racing with Felix Sabates	Dodge
43	John Andretti	Petty Enterprises	Dodge
44	Buckshot Jones	Petty Enterprises	Dodge
45	Kyle Petty	Petty Enterprises	Dodge
50	Rick Mast	Midwest Transit Racing	Chevrolet
55	Bobby Hamilton	Andy Petree Racing	Chevrolet
66	Todd Bodine	Haas-Carter Motorsports	Ford
77	Robert Pressley	Jasper Motorsports	Ford
88	Dale Jarrett	Robert Yates Racing	Ford
90	Hut Stricklin	Donlavey Racing	Ford
92	Stacy Compton	Melling Racing	Dodge
93	Dave Blaney	Bill Davis Racing	Dodge
96	Andy Houston (R)	PPI Motorsports	Ford
97	Kurt Busch (R)	Roush Racing	Ford
99	Jeff Burton	Roush Racing	Ford
Official entry list

== Practice ==
=== First practice ===
The first practice session was held on Friday, May 4, at 12:00 PM EST. The session would last for two hours. Steve Park, driving for Dale Earnhardt, Inc., would set the fastest time in the session, with a lap of 21.580 and an average speed of 125.116 mph (201.355 km/h).

Pos.	#	Driver	Team	Make	Time	Speed
1	1	Steve Park	Dale Earnhardt, Inc.	Chevrolet	21.580	125.116
2	33	Joe Nemechek	Andy Petree Racing	Chevrolet	21.593	125.041
3	2	Rusty Wallace	Penske Racing	Ford	21.638	124.780
Full first practice results

=== Final practice ===
The final practice session was held on Friday, May 4, at 5:50 PM EST. The session would last for one hour and 30 minutes. Jeff Gordon, driving for Hendrick Motorsports, would set the fastest time in the session, with a lap of 22.114 and an average speed of 122.095 mph (196.493 km/h).

Pos.	#	Driver	Team	Make	Time	Speed
1	24	Jeff Gordon	Hendrick Motorsports	Chevrolet	22.114	122.095
2	6	Mark Martin	Roush Racing	Ford	22.145	121.924
3	88	Dale Jarrett	Robert Yates Racing	Ford	22.169	121.792
Full Final practice results

== Qualifying ==
Qualifying was held on Friday, May 4, at 3:30 PM EST. Each driver would have two laps to set a fastest time; the fastest of the two would count as their official qualifying lap. Positions 1-36 would be decided on time, while positions 37-43 would be based on provisionals. Six spots are awarded by the use of provisionals based on owner's points. The seventh is awarded to a past champion who has not otherwise qualified for the race. If no past champ needs the provisional, the next team in the owner points will be awarded a provisional.

Mark Martin, driving for Roush Racing, would win the pole, setting a time of 21.667 and an average speed of 124.613 mph (200.545 km/h).

Three drivers would fail to qualify: Buckshot Jones, Hermie Sadler, and Hut Stricklin.

=== Full qualifying results ===
Pos.	#	Driver	Team	Make	Time	Speed
1	6	Mark Martin	Roush Racing	Ford	21.667	124.613
2	2	Rusty Wallace	Penske Racing South	Ford	21.670	124.596
3	28	Ricky Rudd	Robert Yates Racing	Ford	21.688	124.493
4	1	Steve Park	Dale Earnhardt, Inc.	Chevrolet	21.763	124.064
5	26	Jimmy Spencer	Haas-Carter Motorsports	Ford	21.764	124.058
6	24	Jeff Gordon	Hendrick Motorsports	Chevrolet	21.781	123.961
7	20	Tony Stewart	Joe Gibbs Racing	Pontiac	21.799	123.859
8	9	Bill Elliott	Evernham Motorsports	Dodge	21.815	123.768
9	18	Bobby Labonte	Joe Gibbs Racing	Pontiac	21.825	123.711
10	22	Ward Burton	Bill Davis Racing	Dodge	21.828	123.694
11	10	Johnny Benson Jr.	MBV Motorsports	Pontiac	21.831	123.677
12	15	Michael Waltrip	Dale Earnhardt, Inc.	Chevrolet	21.862	123.502
13	32	Ricky Craven	PPI Motorsports	Ford	21.874	123.434
14	8	Dale Earnhardt Jr.	Dale Earnhardt, Inc.	Chevrolet	21.878	123.412
15	40	Sterling Marlin	Chip Ganassi Racing with Felix Sabates	Dodge	21.907	123.248
16	45	Kyle Petty	Petty Enterprises	Dodge	21.920	123.175
17	99	Jeff Burton	Roush Racing	Ford	21.921	123.170
18	11	Brett Bodine	Brett Bodine Racing	Ford	21.931	123.113
19	17	Matt Kenseth	Roush Racing	Ford	21.949	123.012
20	88	Dale Jarrett	Robert Yates Racing	Ford	21.957	122.968
21	36	Ken Schrader	MB2 Motorsports	Pontiac	21.961	122.945
22	50	Rick Mast	Midwest Transit Racing	Chevrolet	21.976	122.861
23	77	Robert Pressley	Jasper Motorsports	Ford	21.979	122.845
24	31	Mike Skinner	Richard Childress Racing	Chevrolet	21.985	122.811
25	27	Kenny Wallace	Eel River Racing	Pontiac	21.988	122.794
26	55	Bobby Hamilton	Andy Petree Racing	Chevrolet	21.992	122.772
27	4	Kevin Lepage	Morgan–McClure Motorsports	Chevrolet	22.006	122.694
28	01	Jason Leffler (R)	Chip Ganassi Racing with Felix Sabates	Dodge	22.029	122.566
29	25	Jerry Nadeau	Hendrick Motorsports	Chevrolet	22.030	122.560
30	5	Terry Labonte	Hendrick Motorsports	Chevrolet	22.040	122.505
31	97	Kurt Busch (R)	Roush Racing	Ford	22.044	122.482
32	29	Kevin Harvick (R)	Richard Childress Racing	Chevrolet	22.059	122.399
33	7	Mike Wallace	Ultra Motorsports	Ford	22.080	122.283
34	96	Andy Houston (R)	PPI Motorsports	Ford	22.081	122.277
35	12	Jeremy Mayfield	Penske Racing South	Ford	22.093	122.211
36	21	Elliott Sadler	Wood Brothers Racing	Ford	22.096	122.194
Provisionals
37	33	Joe Nemechek	Andy Petree Racing	Chevrolet	22.100	122.172
38	93	Dave Blaney	Bill Davis Racing	Dodge	22.134	121.984
39	43	John Andretti	Petty Enterprises	Dodge	22.170	121.786
40	92	Stacy Compton	Melling Racing	Dodge	22.159	121.847
41	14	Ron Hornaday Jr. (R)	A. J. Foyt Enterprises	Pontiac	22.120	122.061
42	19	Casey Atwood (R)	Evernham Motorsports	Dodge	22.139	121.957
43	66	Todd Bodine	Haas-Carter Motorsports	Ford	22.217	121.529
Failed to qualify
44	44	Buckshot Jones	Petty Enterprises	Dodge	22.228	121.468
45	13	Hermie Sadler	SCORE Motorsports	Chevrolet	22.327	120.930
46	90	Hut Stricklin	Donlavey Racing	Ford	22.357	120.768
Official qualifying results

== Race results ==
Fin	St	#	Driver	Team	Make	Laps	Led	Status	Pts	Winnings
1	7	20	Tony Stewart	Joe Gibbs Racing	Pontiac	400	93	running	180	$150,175
2	6	24	Jeff Gordon	Hendrick Motorsports	Chevrolet	400	0	running	170	$133,827
3	2	2	Rusty Wallace	Penske Racing South	Ford	400	276	running	175	$117,740
4	4	1	Steve Park	Dale Earnhardt, Inc.	Chevrolet	400	0	running	160	$95,493
5	3	28	Ricky Rudd	Robert Yates Racing	Ford	400	27	running	160	$93,297
6	11	10	Johnny Benson Jr.	MBV Motorsports	Pontiac	400	0	running	150	$57,350
7	14	8	Dale Earnhardt Jr.	Dale Earnhardt, Inc.	Chevrolet	400	1	running	151	$75,348
8	19	17	Matt Kenseth	Roush Racing	Ford	400	0	running	142	$52,475
9	21	36	Ken Schrader	MB2 Motorsports	Pontiac	400	0	running	138	$61,235
10	9	18	Bobby Labonte	Joe Gibbs Racing	Pontiac	400	0	running	134	$98,152
11	15	40	Sterling Marlin	Chip Ganassi Racing with Felix Sabates	Dodge	400	0	running	130	$62,995
12	42	19	Casey Atwood (R)	Evernham Motorsports	Dodge	400	0	running	127	$38,950
13	1	6	Mark Martin	Roush Racing	Ford	400	3	running	129	$87,126
14	17	99	Jeff Burton	Roush Racing	Ford	400	0	running	121	$84,521
15	20	88	Dale Jarrett	Robert Yates Racing	Ford	400	0	running	118	$85,712
16	5	26	Jimmy Spencer	Haas-Carter Motorsports	Ford	399	0	running	115	$55,911
17	32	29	Kevin Harvick (R)	Richard Childress Racing	Chevrolet	399	0	running	112	$82,427
18	31	97	Kurt Busch (R)	Roush Racing	Ford	399	0	running	109	$48,650
19	37	33	Joe Nemechek	Andy Petree Racing	Chevrolet	399	0	running	106	$68,195
20	22	50	Rick Mast	Midwest Transit Racing	Chevrolet	398	0	running	103	$39,575
21	10	22	Ward Burton	Bill Davis Racing	Dodge	398	0	running	100	$72,185
22	16	45	Kyle Petty	Petty Enterprises	Dodge	398	0	running	97	$35,725
23	36	21	Elliott Sadler	Wood Brothers Racing	Ford	398	0	running	94	$61,215
24	24	31	Mike Skinner	Richard Childress Racing	Chevrolet	398	0	running	91	$70,699
25	33	7	Mike Wallace	Ultra Motorsports	Ford	397	0	running	88	$49,600
26	28	01	Jason Leffler (R)	Chip Ganassi Racing with Felix Sabates	Dodge	397	0	running	85	$46,400
27	27	4	Kevin Lepage	Morgan–McClure Motorsports	Chevrolet	397	0	running	82	$37,675
28	26	55	Bobby Hamilton	Andy Petree Racing	Chevrolet	396	0	running	79	$45,450
29	40	92	Stacy Compton	Melling Racing	Dodge	396	0	running	76	$37,225
30	43	66	Todd Bodine	Haas-Carter Motorsports	Ford	396	0	running	73	$37,600
31	41	14	Ron Hornaday Jr. (R)	A. J. Foyt Enterprises	Pontiac	394	0	running	70	$36,550
32	23	77	Robert Pressley	Jasper Motorsports	Ford	393	0	running	67	$42,000
33	38	93	Dave Blaney	Bill Davis Racing	Dodge	388	0	crash	64	$33,950
34	39	43	John Andretti	Petty Enterprises	Dodge	387	0	running	61	$68,927
35	12	15	Michael Waltrip	Dale Earnhardt, Inc.	Chevrolet	364	0	running	58	$43,850
36	35	12	Jeremy Mayfield	Penske Racing South	Ford	359	0	running	55	$73,084
37	8	9	Bill Elliott	Evernham Motorsports	Dodge	342	0	running	52	$58,473
38	30	5	Terry Labonte	Hendrick Motorsports	Chevrolet	329	0	rear end	49	$66,430
39	18	11	Brett Bodine	Brett Bodine Racing	Ford	327	0	running	46	$33,625
40	25	27	Kenny Wallace	Eel River Racing	Pontiac	322	0	engine	43	$33,550
41	29	25	Jerry Nadeau	Hendrick Motorsports	Chevrolet	257	0	crash	40	$41,500
42	34	96	Andy Houston (R)	PPI Motorsports	Ford	206	0	engine	37	$33,455
43	13	32	Ricky Craven	PPI Motorsports	Ford	165	0	crash	34	$33,654
Official race results

== Standings after the race ==
	Pos	Driver	Points
	1	Dale Jarrett	1,559
	2	Jeff Gordon	1,545 (–14)
1	3	Rusty Wallace	1,497 (–62)
1	4	Johnny Benson Jr.	1,480 (–79)
	5	Sterling Marlin	1,421 (–138)
	6	Ricky Rudd	1,411 (–148)
2	7	Tony Stewart	1,392 (–167)
	8	Steve Park	1,387 (–172)
2	9	Bobby Hamilton	1,309 (–250)
	10	Dale Earnhardt Jr.	1,302 (–257)

Previous race: 2001 NAPA Auto Parts 500	NASCAR Winston Cup Series; 2001 season	Next race: 2001 Coca-Cola 600
