= Jeff Burton =

American racing driver (born 1967)

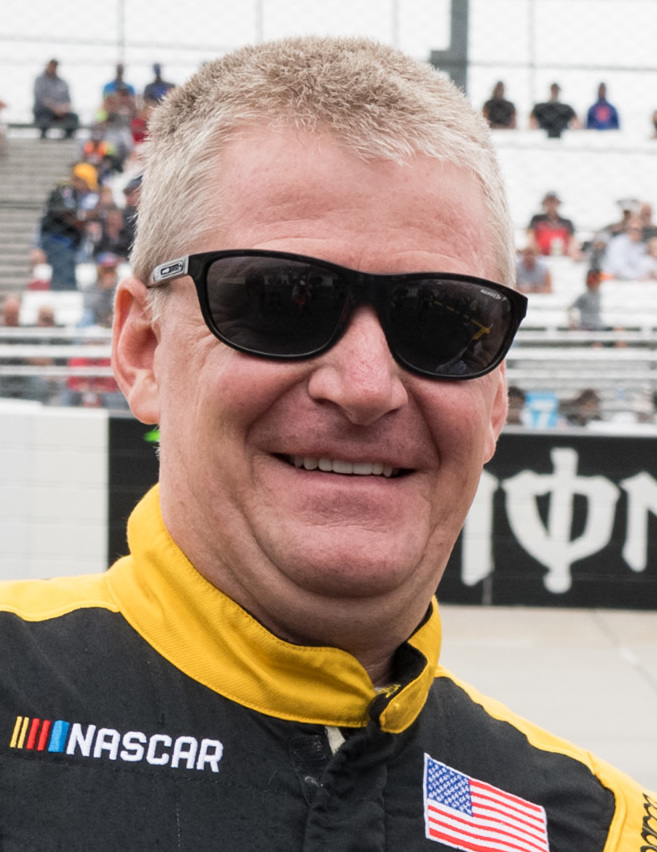
- Burton at Dover International Speedway in 2019
- Born: Jeffrey Tyler Burton; June 29, 1967 (age 59); South Boston, Virginia, U.S.
- Height: 5 ft 7 in (1.70 m)
- Achievements: 1999 Southern 500 Winner; 1999, 2001 Coca-Cola 600 Winner
- Awards: 1994 Winston Cup Series Rookie of the Year; Named one of NASCAR's 75 Greatest Drivers (2023); NASCAR Hall of Fame (2027)

NASCAR Cup Series career
- 695 races run over 22 years
- 2014 position: 41st
- Best finish: 3rd (2000)
- First race: 1993 Slick 50 300 (Loudon)
- Last race: 2014 Irwin Tools Night Race (Bristol)
- First win: 1997 Interstate Batteries 500 (Texas)
- Last win: 2008 Bank of America 500 (Charlotte)
Wins	Top tens	Poles
21	254	6

NASCAR O'Reilly Auto Parts Series career
- 306 races run over 20 years
- 2009 position: 28th
- Best finish: 9th (1992)
- First race: 1988 Miller Classic (Martinsville)
- Last race: 2009 Ford 300 (Homestead)
- First win: 1990 Zerex 150 (Martinsville)
- Last win: 2007 Ford 300 (Homestead)
Wins	Top tens	Poles
27	153	11

NASCAR FedEx Freight Truck Series career
- 4 races run over 1 year
- 1996 position: 42nd
- Best finish: 42nd (1996)
- First race: 1996 Lund Look 225 (Topeka)
- Last race: 1996 Hanes 250 (Martinsville)
Wins	Top tens	Poles
0	3	0
- Statistics up to date as of August 23, 2014.

Jeffrey Tyler Burton (born June 29, 1967), nicknamed "the Mayor", is an American former professional stock car racing driver and current racing commentator. He is a member of the Burton racing family. He scored 21 career victories in the NASCAR Cup Series, including two Coca-Cola 600s in 1999 and 2001 and the 1999 Southern 500. He currently serves as a color commentator for NBC Sports, having joined them upon their return to their coverage of NASCAR. His son and nephew, Harrison and Jeb, respectively, both currently compete in the NASCAR O'Reilly Auto Parts Series, while his brother Ward Burton has also raced in the Cup Series.

== Early career ==
Burton was exposed to racing at an early age. After their father introduced Burton and his brothers to go-kart racing, Burton later moved up to late model stock cars and late models, driving at South Boston Speedway.

== NASCAR career ==
=== Early career ===
Burton began driving in several races in the Busch Series in 1988 in car number 69 owned by his father John Burton. He competed in the full season for Busch Series Rookie of the Year in 1989 in the No. 12 Burton Autosports Pontiac. In 1990, he drove the No. 12 Armour Lower Salt Bacon Buick for Sam Ard, where he won his first career race. Burton and Ard later went to court over financial losses suffered throughout the year. He moved to J&J Racing's No. 99 Armour / Food Lion Chevrolet in 1991 for one year before moving on to FILMAR Racing owned by Filbert Martocci where he would drive an Oldsmobile sponsored by TIC Financial Systems in 1992, and a Ford sponsored by Baby Ruth in 1993. Burton would later make his first Winston Cup start in 1993 in car No. 0 owned by Martocci.

=== FILMAR Racing ===
Burton ran his first Winston Cup race in 1993 in the No. 0 TIC Financial Ford Thunderbird for Fil Martocci.

=== Stavola Brothers Racing ===
1994 was Burton's rookie year in the Winston Cup Series, driving the No. 8 Raybestos Ford for Stavola Brothers Racing. After five races, he reached a season-high 14th-place finish in the overall standings, but by the end of the year, he dropped to 24th after being disqualified at the Miller Genuine Draft 400 for illegal holes drilled on the roll cage, a safety violation. He earned a season-high fourth place finish on the way to earning 1994 NASCAR Rookie of the Year. He was one of a record-high ten rookies eligible for the award that year, besting a class that included future Cup stars Joe Nemechek, Jeremy Mayfield, John Andretti, and older brother Ward. The next year, in 1995, Burton had one top-five, along with a ninth-place finish. He also missed three races and finished 32nd in points.

=== Roush Racing ===
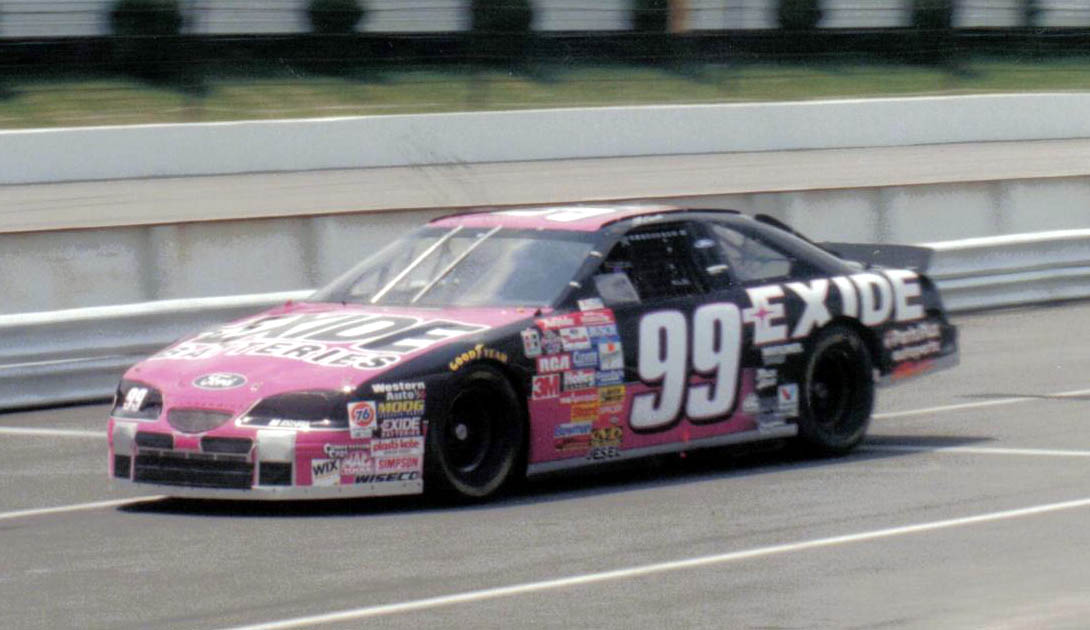
1997 racecar

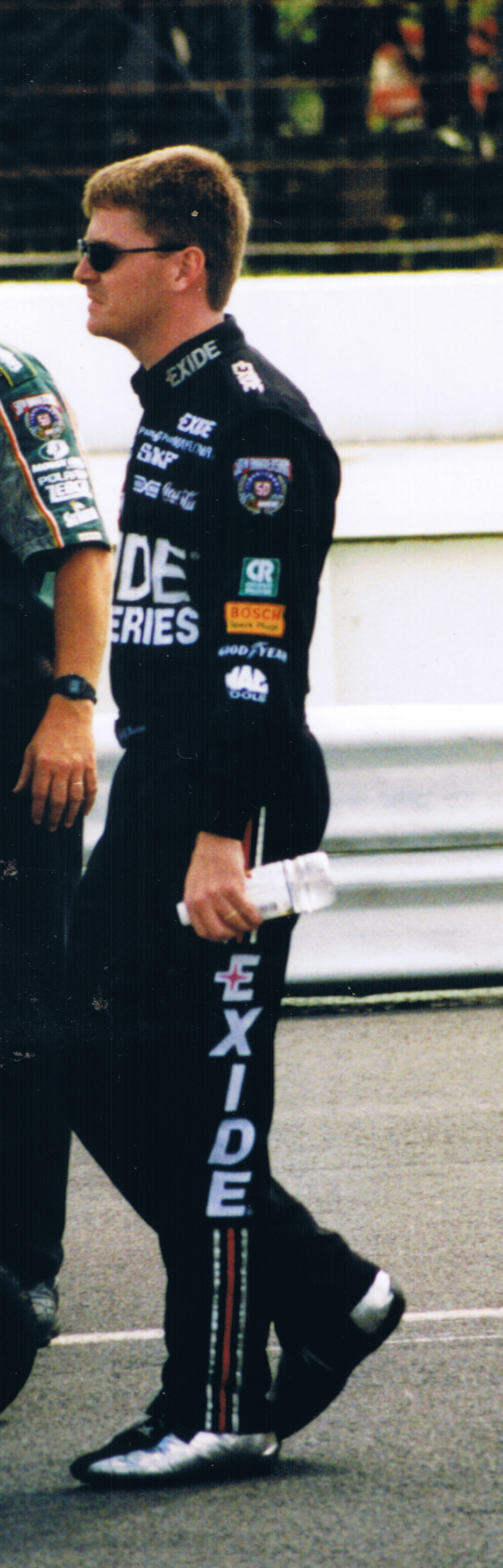
Jeff Burton walks to his car for qualifying at Pocono Raceway in 1998.

In 1996, Burton signed with Roush Racing, where he began driving the No. 99 Exide Batteries Ford Thunderbird. He finished 13th overall in the season points standings despite failing to qualify for the Purolator 500 in March as a new team (provisionals in the first four races were based on 1995 points, and Burton's team did not have points from 1995). His career hit a peak from 1997 to 2000, as he ranked in the top-five in points for all four seasons. He achieved his first career win in 1997 in the Interstate Batteries 500 at Texas Motor Speedway (the inaugural NASCAR race at the track), and would go on to win fourteen more races during the four-year run. In 1998, the team switched to the new Ford Taurus. In 1999, Burton won a career-high six races, including the Jiffy Lube 300 for a third straight year, and clinched two of the series' four majors: the Coca-Cola 600 and the 50th Annual Southern 500, both of which earned him the No Bull 5 $1 million bonus, which would lead to a 5th-place finish in points. In addition, after winning at Darlington in March, he would lead the point standings for the next five races. His best points finish was in third in 2000, just 294 points behind champion Bobby Labonte. On September 17, 2000, Burton led every lap of the Dura Lube 300 at New Hampshire International Speedway, in unique circumstances (this race was the only Loudon race to use a restrictor plate, imposed for safety reasons after the deaths of Adam Petty and Kenny Irwin Jr. earlier in the year at the track). From 1997 to 2000, Burton won an event at NHIS every year.

In late 2000, Burton and the No. 99 welcomed Citgo as a new sponsor. In 2001, Burton won another two races, upping his career total to seventeen, and he finished tenth in points, climbing from a season low of 38th, which was his position after four races. In 2002 and 2003, he finished 12th in the points and had eight top-fives and twenty-five top-tens combined, but failed to win a race in either year. Citgo then announced that they were leaving Roush Racing at the end of the 2003 season.

Burton ran the 2004 season without a primary sponsor, with races frequently being sponsored by his personal sponsor SKF. Rumors began to arise that Burton would be leaving Roush Racing. After originally denying the rumors, it finally happened in mid-2004 when, just before the Sirius at The Glen, Burton signed a three-year contract with Richard Childress Racing (RCR), leaving Roush after eight and a half years with the team.

=== Richard Childress Racing ===
==== No. 30 car ====
Upon joining RCR, Burton was placed in the No. 30 AOL Chevrolet. He was the fourth driver to pilot the car that season; Johnny Sauter was promoted from RCR's Busch Series program to take over the car but was released after thirteen races and was replaced by Dave Blaney, with Jim Inglebright making a one race appearance at Sonoma. Blaney was later released when Burton became available. Prior to the driver change, Burton himself was struggling, with an average finish of 20.8 and was 23rd in points. In the thirteen races after he changed teams, though, the same stats were improved to 16.6 and eighteenth. During the offseason, Burton and his team remained with RCR but were switched to the No. 31 Cingular Wireless Chevrolet, replacing Robby Gordon. Blaney took his place in the No. 30, which was renumbered to the No. 07.

==== No. 31 car ====
2005 was Burton's first full season at RCR, and he had six top-tens and three top-fives for the year, including a 3rd-place finish in the Subway Fresh 500 at Phoenix in April and a second place finish in the Sharpie 500 at Bristol Motor Speedway.

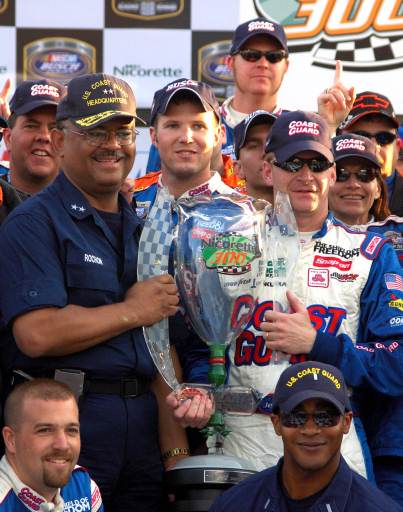
Stephen Rochon and Jeff Burton hold the victory trophy from 2006 Nicorette 300

In 2006, Burton won the pole for four races, bringing his total number of career pole wins to six. This poles were for the Daytona 500, the USG Sheetrock 400 at Chicagoland Speedway, the Brickyard 400 at Indianapolis Motor Speedway, and the GFS Marketplace 400 at Michigan International Speedway. Prior to qualifying for the Daytona 500, Burton was extremely enthusiastic about the improvements to RCR as a whole. He proved this by winning his first pole since September 2000 at Richmond. The Allstate 400 pole gave Richard Childress Racing the front row as teammate Clint Bowyer recorded the second fastest time. Burton's best finish came in the Chicagoland race, where he finished second. He led the most laps at Indianapolis and Bristol's Sharpie 500, setting the pace for more than half the race. In the Busch Series, he won at Atlanta Motor Speedway and Dover International Speedway, breaking his four-year winless streak in any series. After the race at Richmond International Raceway Jeff qualified for the Chase for the Nextel Cup. During the Chase, Burton won the Dover 400 at Dover International Speedway, breaking a 185-race winless streak dating back to October 28, 2001, allowing him to take the points lead, and retain it for the next three races. However, a series of relatively poor finishes in subsequent races, including a flat tire at Talladega while running in the Top 5 and an engine failure at Martinsville, eliminated Burton from contention for the championship.

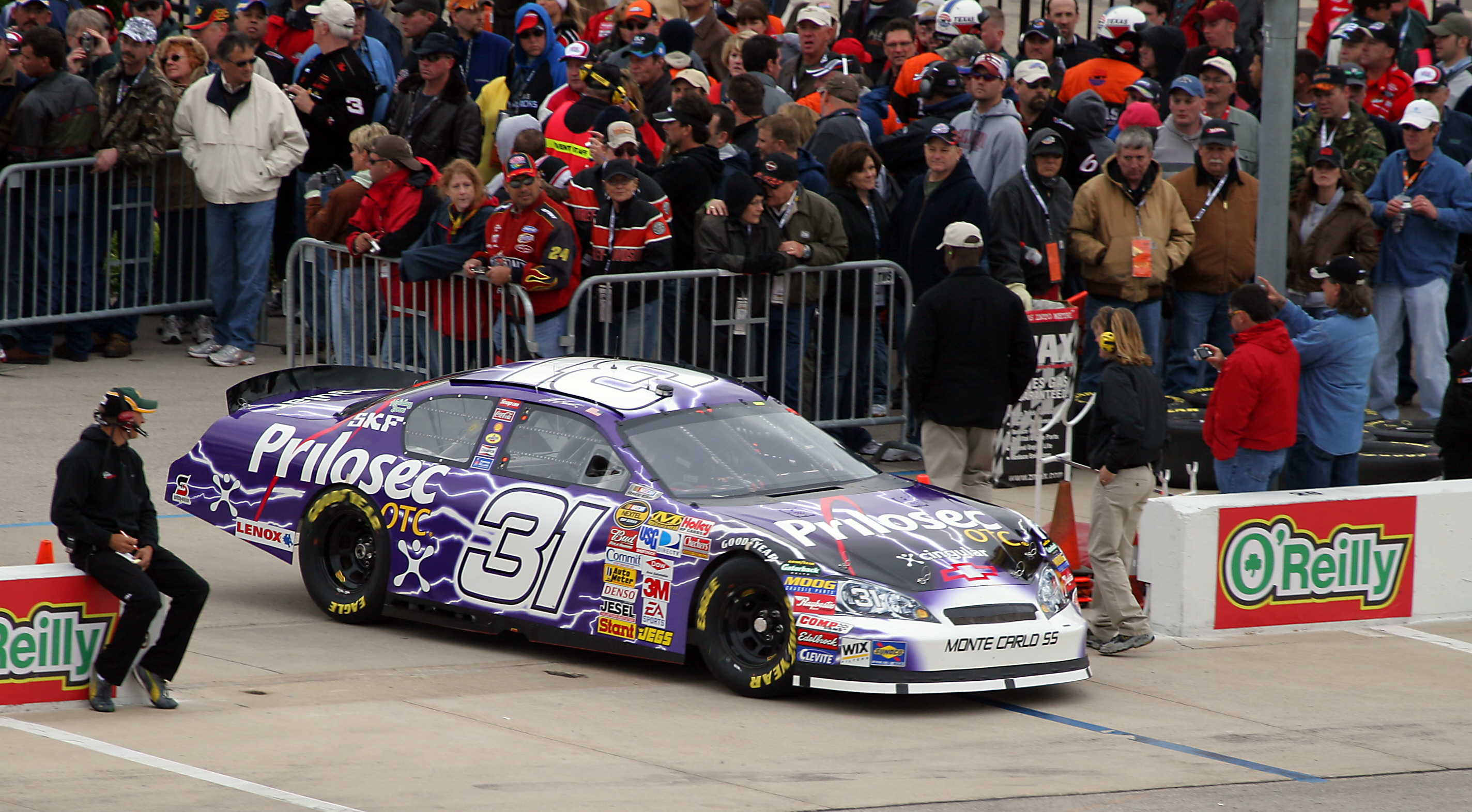
Burton in the pits during his 2007 win at Texas

Burton won the Samsung 500 at Texas on April 15, 2007, driving with sponsorship from Prilosec OTC, passing former teammate Matt Kenseth on the final lap, making him the first driver to have multiple wins at Texas Motor Speedway. He later went on to qualify for the Chase for the Nextel Cup, he tied for seventh in the 2007 standings.

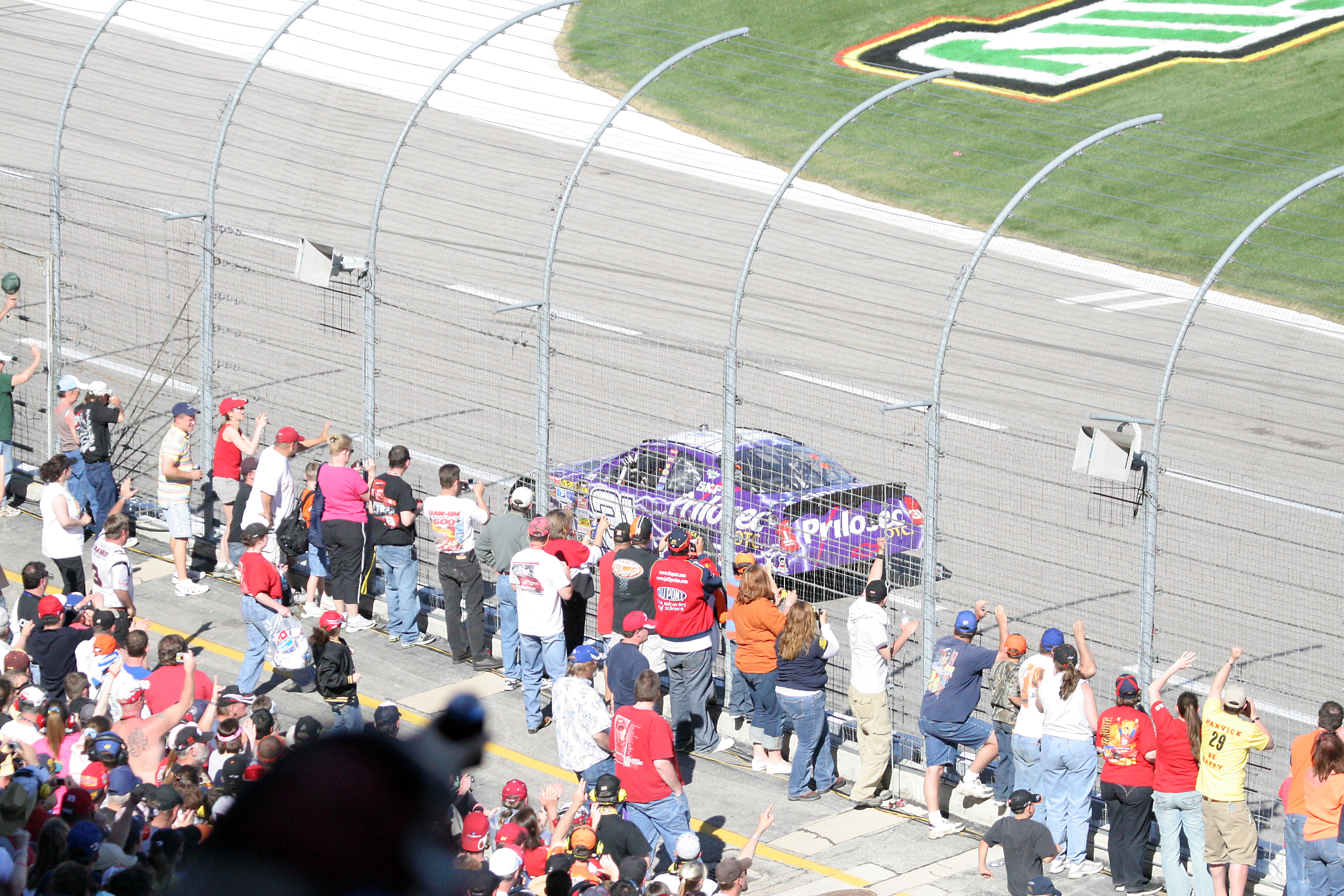
Burton celebrates after winning at Texas in 2007

Burton came very close to winning the 50th annual Daytona 500. He qualified 36th and by the end of the race, he had worked his way up in the field. He led prior to the race's final caution, but when the green flag dropped with four laps to go, lost several positions and wound up finishing 13th.

Burton won the Food City 500 at Bristol Motor Speedway. Following contact between Kevin Harvick and Tony Stewart, Burton passed Harvick and Stewart for 2nd. On the ensuing restart, Burton passed Denny Hamlin coming off of turn two to win the Food City 500 and finishing off a sweep of the podium for Richard Childress Racing. Burton also won the 2008 Bank of America 500 at Lowe's Motor Speedway. Burton took the lead from Greg Biffle with just over seventy laps to go. During the final round of pit stops, Burton took fuel only and held off a hard charging Jimmie Johnson for his first multiple win season since 2001.

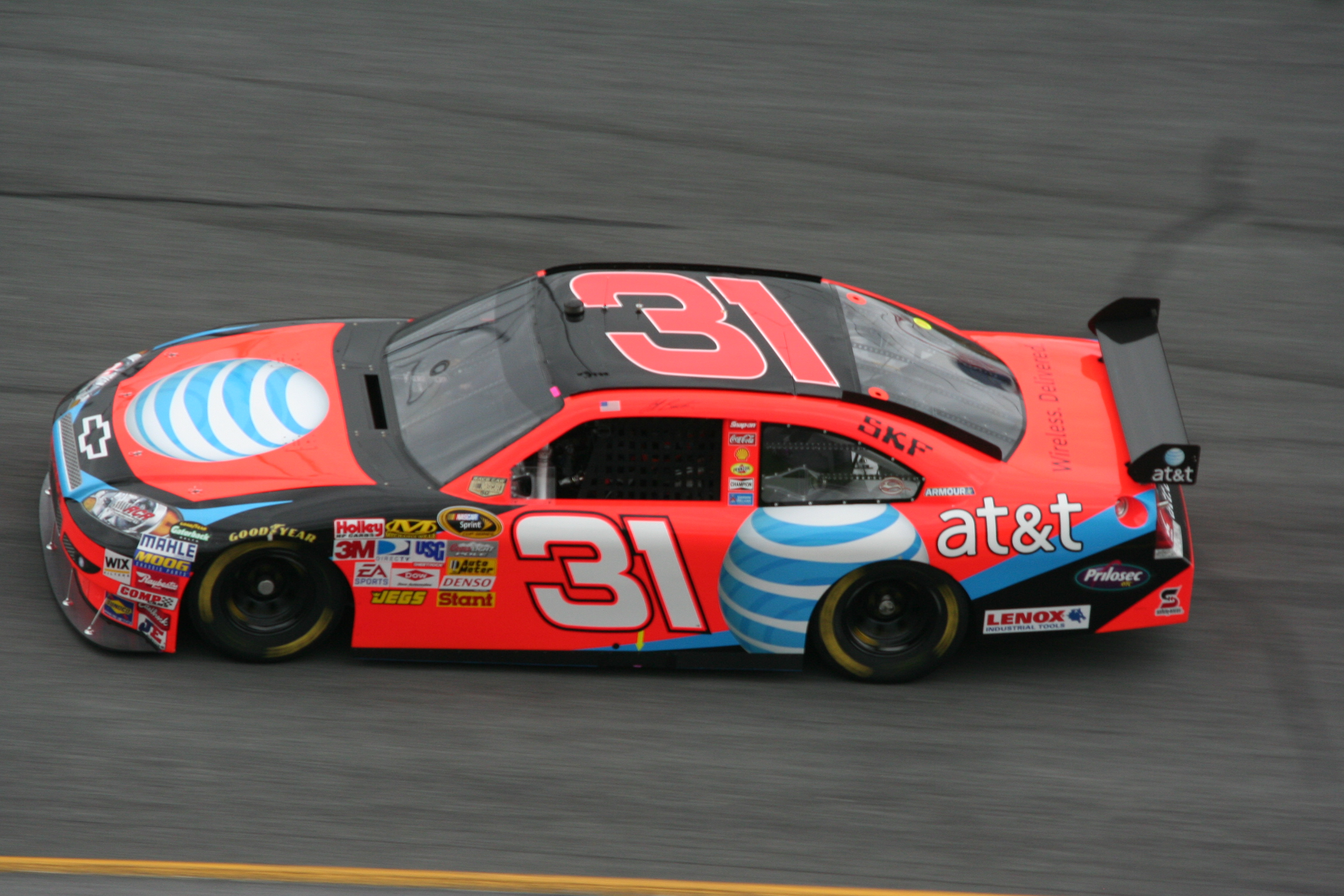
2008 Cup car at Daytona

In 2009, Caterpillar signed on as a sponsor through 2011. Burton was expected to make a run for the championship but a poor season led Burton to miss the Chase for the first time since 2005. Burton's best finish that year was a pair of 2nd-place finishes in the final two races at Phoenix and Homestead, which eventually put him seventeenth in points.

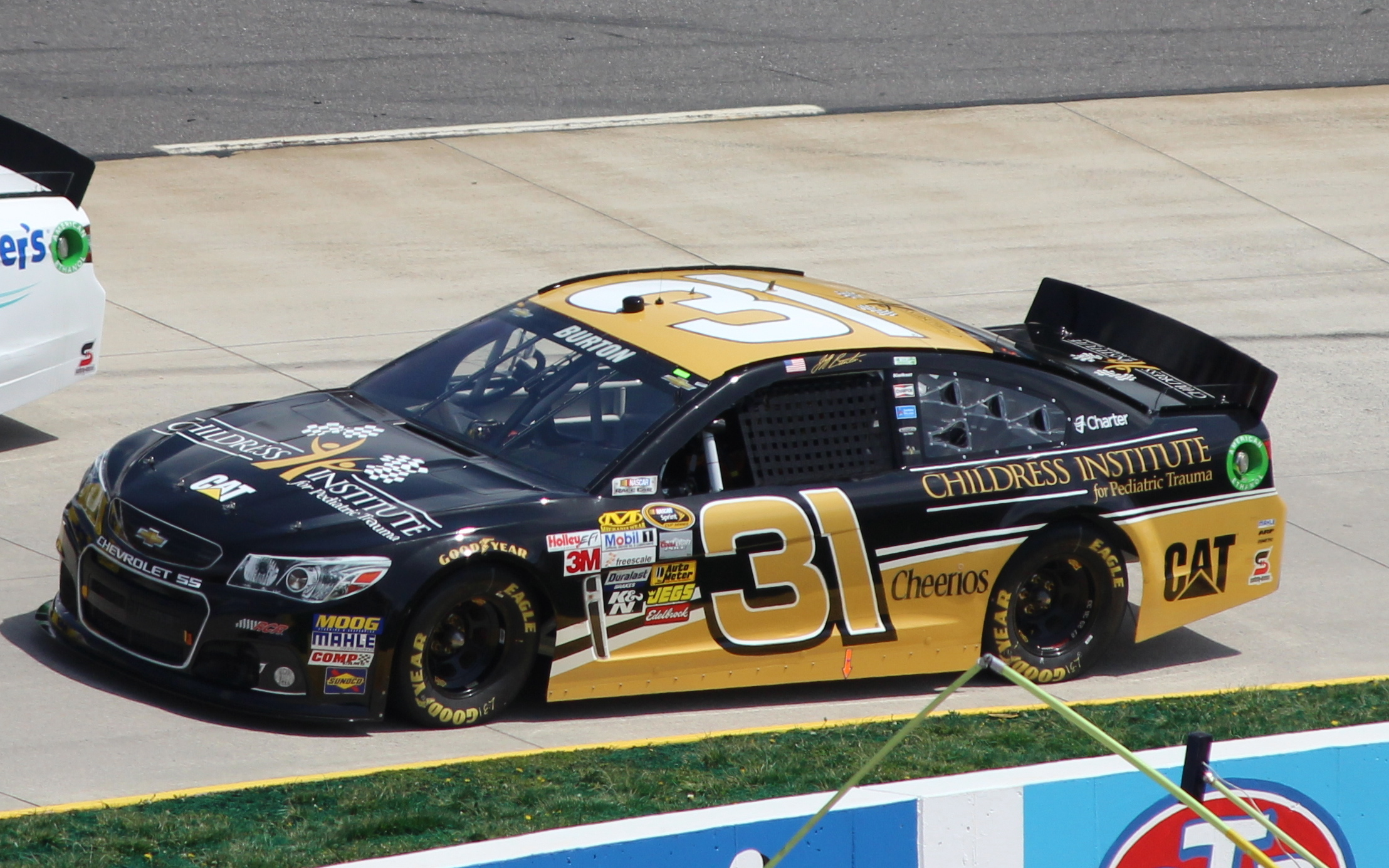
Burton during the 2013 STP Gas Booster 500

In 2010, he rebounded but he had still not won a race, although he made the Chase and finished second in both Dover races. He nearly won the fall Martinsville race, but a flat tire with fifteen laps remaining gave Denny Hamlin the win. A couple weeks later, he and Jeff Gordon got into a wreck long after the caution was out. Burton walked up the track to confront Gordon and the two got into a shoving match. Burton finished 12th in the final points standings. Afterward, Burton assumed responsibility for the incident, stating he was attempting to catch up to Gordon, but was unable to see in the sunlight's glare.

In 2011, Burton was looking for a better season, but a very bad season gave Burton a poor series of finishes. He won the second Gatorade Duel, edging out his Richard Childress Racing teammate Clint Bowyer. After that, Burton's season went downhill from there. He was leading the Daytona 500 halfway when his engine gave out. He nearly won the Coca-Cola 600 but got spun out on the final restart. Though wanting another caution, the yellow flag never came out because NASCAR wanted to see the race finish under green, and Dale Earnhardt Jr. was leading when the accident occurred. His teammate Kevin Harvick passed Earnhardt Jr. within the last 500 yards of the race because Dale Jr. ran out of gas. This led to controversy because fans were speculating that NASCAR wanted Earnhardt to win and go back to victory lane in the first time in three years. Burton's first top-ten came in the twenty first race at Watkins Glen International. Burton missed the 2011 Chase but had a strong run at the fall race at Talladega, leading on the last lap and out of turn four being pushed by Clint Bowyer. At the tri-oval, Bowyer slingshotted to Burton's outside and won by a hood, giving Richard Childress his 100th win as a team owner, Bowyer redeeming his 0.002 second loss to Jimmie Johnson at the track in the spring. In 2012, Burton gained the sponsorship in Wheaties, BB&T and EnerSys. The 31 team also switched crew chiefs too, and Drew Blickensderfer became the crew chief. After a dismal 2012, Blickensderfer was released four races early and Luke Lambert became Burton's crew chief in 2013. Shane Wilson became interim crew chief until the end of 2012. Burton had six top-tens in 2012, including a dramatic second-place finish at Daytona in July after saving his car from spinning on the final lap. At the AdvoCare 500 at Phoenix International Raceway, Burton would make his 1,000th career NASCAR start, the sixth driver in NASCAR history to do so.

On September 4, 2013, Richard Childress Racing announced that Burton would not be returning to RCR in 2014. On November 8, Burton stated that he would run a part-time schedule in 2014. Burton later said that he wanted to stay with RCR for 2014 to transition straight from racing to television, but RCR chose to sign Ryan Newman instead.

===== AT&T sponsorship controversy =====
Cingular Wireless began its sponsorship of the No. 31 Chevrolet in the NASCAR NEXTEL Cup series prior to 2004 when NEXTEL purchased the naming rights to NASCAR's top division. Cingular and Alltel, the sponsors of Ryan Newman's No. 12 Dodge, were allowed to stay as sponsors under a grandfather clause. In early 2007, following its purchase by AT&T, Cingular began a rebranding effort to the AT&T Mobility brand. NASCAR quickly claimed that a clause in their contract with Sprint Nextel would not allow Cingular to change either the name or brand advertised on the No. 31 car.

After failing to persuade NASCAR to approve the addition of the AT&T globe logo to the rear of the car, AT&T filed a lawsuit against NASCAR on March 16, 2007. On May 18, AT&T won a preliminary injunction and, following a failed emergency motion for a stay by NASCAR on May 19, rebranded the No. 31 car in time for the Nextel All-Star Challenge that evening. NASCAR was later granted an appeal to be heard on August 2.

On June 17, NASCAR announced it had filed a $100 million lawsuit against AT&T and would like AT&T and all other telecommunications companies out of the sport in 2008. The other rival company involved, Alltel, was in the process of being sold.

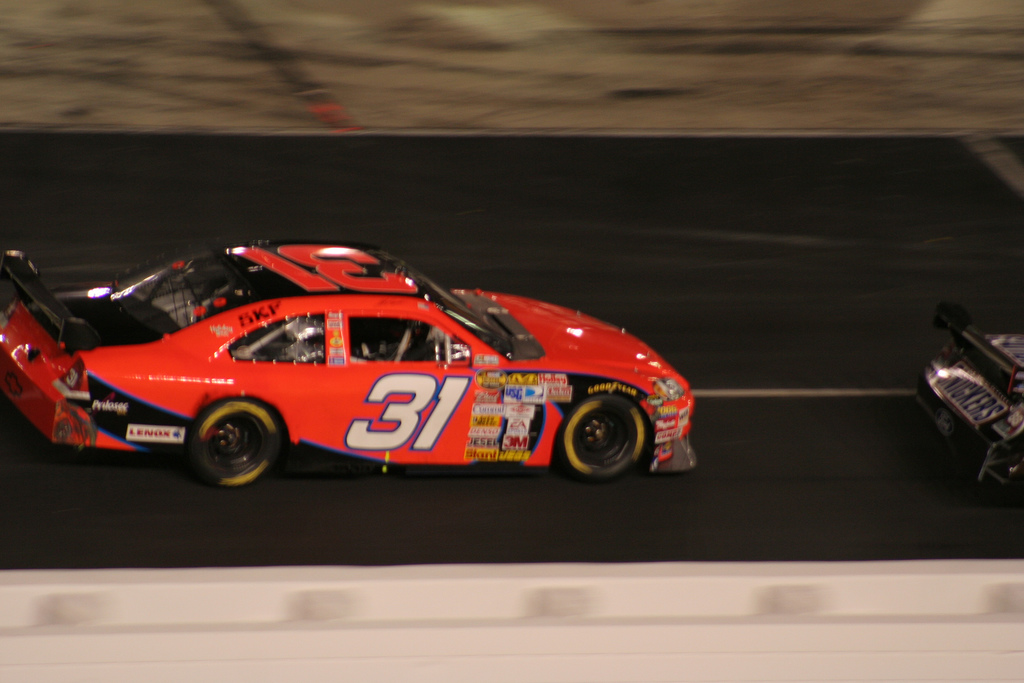
2007 paint scheme without any AT&T logo visible

On August 13, a ruling by a federal appeals court cleared the way for NASCAR to prevent AT&T, Inc. from featuring its logo on Burton's No. 31 Richard Childress Racing Chevrolet. The court, therefore, threw out a lower court's ruling that prevented NASCAR from stopping AT&T's plans. The appeals court remanded the case to the U.S. District Court in Atlanta.

At first practice for the Sharpie 500 at Bristol Motor Speedway on August 24, the No. 31 car had no AT&T branding, but the familiar orange and black paint scheme. Burton's pit crew wore grey Richard Childress Racing shirts and Burton wore a plain orange fire suit displaying only small associate sponsor logos. The car arrived in a black hauler with only the number 31 on the side. NASCAR officials said the car would not have made it through inspection with the AT&T logos.

On September 7, 2007, NASCAR announced that an agreement had been reached between Sprint Nextel and Richard Childress Racing which would allow AT&T to sponsor the No. 31 car through the end of the 2008 season. Under the terms of the agreement Burton was required to find a new sponsor by 2009. On June 18, 2008, it was announced that RCR had secured sponsorship for the 31 of Burton. Caterpillar, which previously spent 10 years on the No. 22 of Bill Davis Racing and with Jeff's brother Ward driving from 1999 to 2003, signed a multi-year agreement with Richard Childress Racing to become the new primary sponsor of the 31 starting in 2009.

=== Michael Waltrip Racing ===
On December 2, 2013, it was announced that Burton had been hired by Michael Waltrip Racing to run a limited schedule for MWR's research-and-development team, Identity Ventures Racing. Burton made his debut in the No. 66 at Las Vegas.

Prior to Burton's scheduled start at Michigan, it was announced he would be replaced as R&D driver by Brett Moffitt, though he would be given one more start at Loudon, which was expected to be his final career race.

=== Stewart–Haas Racing ===
However, on August 14, 2014, Burton was picked up by Stewart–Haas Racing to replace Tony Stewart in the No. 14 at the Pure Michigan 400 and the Irwin Tools Night Race, in the aftermath of the death of sprint car driver Kevin Ward Jr.

== Post–racing career and business ventures ==
On December 3, 2013, NBC Sports Network producer Sam Flood announced that Burton would become an analyst for NBC in 2015.

On January 9, 2023, a consortium consisting of Jeff Burton Autosports, Inc., DEJ Management, Kevin Harvick Incorporated, and Trackhouse Racing Team purchased the CARS Tour.

== Personal life ==
Burton is the younger brother of Ward Burton, who is a former Cup Series driver. Married to wife Kim, they have two children: Paige and Harrison. Harrison, like his father, is a NASCAR driver, and currently races in the O'Reilly Auto Parts Series, and is the winner of the 2024 Coke Zero Sugar 400. Burton also has another brother, Brian, who did not drive in NASCAR but rather took over the family's construction business.

Burton's family ancestry can be traced back through Colonial Virginia where the landing of his earliest ancestor Richard Burton came over to the Jamestown Colony in the 1630s. The earliest his ancestry goes is back to the 1200s with his ancestor Rodger de Burghton.

Burton is a fan of Bruce Lee. At the Coca-Cola 500 at Twin Ring Motegi in Japan, he raced a special Bruce Lee paint scheme on his No. 99 Ford.

== Motorsports career results ==
=== NASCAR ===
(key) (Bold – Pole position awarded by qualifying time. Italics – Pole position earned by points standings or practice time. * – Most laps led ** – All laps led.)

==== Sprint Cup Series ====
NASCAR Sprint Cup Series results
Year	Team	No.	Make	1	2	3	4	5	6	7	8	9	10	11	12	13	14	15	16	17	18	19	20	21	22	23	24	25	26	27	28	29	30	31	32	33	34	35	36	NSCC	Pts	Ref
1993	FILMAR Racing	0	Ford	DAY	CAR	RCH	ATL	DAR	BRI	NWS	MAR	TAL	SON	CLT	DOV	POC	MCH	DAY	NHA; 37	POC	TAL	GLN	MCH	BRI	DAR	RCH	DOV	MAR	NWS	CLT	CAR	PHO	ATL							83rd	52	
1994	Stavola Brothers Racing	8	Ford	DAY; 26	CAR; 20	RCH; 20	ATL; 4	DAR; 20	BRI; 31	NWS; 33	MAR; 36	TAL; 39	SON; 15	CLT; 29	DOV; 33	POC; 22	MCH; 21	DAY; 18	NHA; 38	POC; 4	TAL; 26	IND; 19	GLN; 25	MCH; 33	BRI; 20	DAR; 8	RCH; DNQ	DOV; 37	MAR; 36	NWS; 28	CLT; 25	CAR; 11	PHO; 27	ATL; 31						24th	2726	
1995	Stavola Brothers Racing	8	Ford	DAY; 24	CAR; 19	RCH; 31	ATL; 33	DAR; 19	BRI; 28	NWS; 26	MAR; DNQ	TAL; 25	SON; 18	CLT; 40	DOV; 25	POC; 36	MCH; 31	DAY; 18	NHA; 25	POC; 27	TAL; 22	IND; 38	GLN; 38	MCH; 23	BRI; 9	DAR; 16	RCH; 13	DOV; 20	MAR; 31	NWS; DNQ	CLT; 31	CAR; 5	PHO; 23	ATL; 36						32nd	2556	
1996	Roush Racing	99	Ford	DAY; 5	CAR; 13	RCH; 4	ATL; DNQ	DAR; 10	BRI; 23	NWS; 29	MAR; 22	TAL; 16	SON; 26	CLT; 18	DOV; 9	POC; 9	MCH; 17	DAY; 14	NHA; 4	POC; 35	TAL; 7	IND; 11	GLN; 21	**MCH**; 9	BRI; 37	DAR; 31	RCH; 3	DOV; 40	MAR; 11	NWS; 4	CLT; 11	CAR; 5	PHO; 31	ATL; 9						13th	3538	
1997	Roush Racing	99	Ford	DAY; 11	CAR; 3	RCH; 42	ATL; 5	DAR; 4	TEX; 1	BRI; 42	MAR; 15	SON; 9	TAL; 8	CLT; 5	DOV; 3	POC; 2	MCH; 14	CAL; 30	DAY; 8	NHA; 1*	POC; 3	IND; 15	GLN; 29	MCH; 8	BRI; 4	DAR; 2	RCH; 2*	NHA; 14	DOV; 11	MAR; 1	CLT; 6	TAL; 14	CAR; 38	PHO; 13	ATL; 34					4th	4285	
1998	Roush Racing	99	Ford	DAY; 40	CAR; 18	LVS; 2	ATL; 8	DAR; 5*	BRI; 4	TEX; 29	MAR; 32	TAL; 43	CAL; 10	CLT; 8	DOV; 2	RCH; 7	MCH; 4	POC; 4	SON; 39	NHA; 1*	POC; 3	IND; 36	GLN; 23	MCH; 5	BRI; 2	NHA; 5	DAR; 2*	RCH; 1*	DOV; 38	MAR; 5	CLT; 3	TAL; 10	DAY; 13	PHO; 4	CAR; 5	ATL; 4				5th	4415	
1999	Roush Racing	99	Ford	DAY; 35	CAR; 4*	LVS; 1*	ATL; 4	DAR; 1*	TEX; 7	BRI; 5	MAR; 2	TAL; 11	CAL; 2	RCH; 37	CLT; 1*	DOV; 8	MCH; 3	POC; 36	SON; 24	DAY; 3	NHA; 1	POC; 36	IND; 5	GLN; 13	MCH; 37	BRI; 17	DAR; 1*	RCH; 13	NHA; 4	DOV; 6	MAR; 9	CLT; 37	TAL; 8	CAR; 1	PHO; 4	HOM; 3	ATL; 5			5th	4733	
2000	Roush Racing	99	Ford	DAY; 2	CAR; 32	LVS; 1*	ATL; 43	DAR; 5	BRI; 9	TEX; 2	MAR; 2	TAL; 12	CAL; 5	RCH; 7	CLT; 11	DOV; 34	MCH; 11	POC; 7	SON; 16	DAY; 1	NHA; 11	POC; 2	IND; 6	GLN; 3	MCH; 10	BRI; 6	DAR; 2	**RCH**; 5*	NHA; 1**	DOV; 36	MAR; 3*	CLT; 6	TAL; 29	CAR; 4	PHO; 1*	HOM; 11	ATL; 12			3rd	4841	
2001	Roush Racing	99	Ford	DAY; 19	CAR; 37	LVS; 39	ATL; 30	DAR; 18	BRI; 40	TEX; 19	MAR; 3	TAL; 10	CAL; 31	RCH; 14	CLT; 1*	DOV; 31	MCH; 7	POC; 10	SON; 8	DAY; 8	CHI; 18	NHA; 11	POC; 36	IND; 16	GLN; 2	MCH; 16	BRI; 15	DAR; 6	RCH; 9	DOV; 21	KAN; 11	CLT; 5	MAR; 5	TAL; 3	PHO; 1*	CAR; 18	HOM; 4	ATL; 10	NHA; 17	10th	4394	
2002	Roush Racing	99	Ford	DAY; 12	CAR; 6	LVS; 9	ATL; 21	DAR; 11	BRI; 26	TEX; 39	MAR; 9	TAL; 9	CAL; 19	RCH; 3	CLT; 40	DOV; 3	POC; 6	MCH; 20	SON; 29	DAY; 33	CHI; 39	NHA; 12	POC; 16	IND; 29	GLN; 7	MCH; 4	BRI; 13	DAR; 10	RCH; 39	NHA; 20	DOV; 6	KAN; 29	TAL; 11	CLT; 7	MAR; 17	ATL; 12	CAR; 4	PHO; 12	HOM; 3	12th	4259	
2003	Roush Racing	99	Ford	DAY; 11	CAR; 12	LVS; 6	ATL; 33	DAR; 42	BRI; 13	TEX; 20	TAL; 35	MAR; 4	CAL; 19	RCH; 9	CLT; 18	DOV; 14	POC; 14	MCH; 11	SON; 38	DAY; 2	CHI; 6	NHA; 9	POC; 6	IND; 27	GLN; 31	MCH; 11	BRI; 32	DAR; 11	RCH; 4	NHA; 42	DOV; 12	TAL; 32	KAN; 13	CLT; 20	MAR; 10	ATL; 23	PHO; 8	CAR; 7	HOM; 14	12th	4109	
2004	Roush Racing	99	Ford	DAY; 42	CAR; 37	LVS; 13	ATL; 20	DAR; 11	BRI; 38	TEX; 27	MAR; 25	TAL; 7	CAL; 26	RCH; 14	CLT; 22	DOV; 4	POC; 24	MCH; 13	SON; 9	DAY; 23	CHI; 33	NHA; 12	POC; 34	IND; 12	GLN; 12															18th	3902	
2004	Richard Childress Racing	30	Chevy																							MCH; 12	BRI; 4	CAL; 15	RCH; 23	NHA; 15	DOV; 33	TAL; 13	KAN; 15	CLT; 9	MAR; 11	ATL; 6	PHO; 11	DAR; 13	HOM; 36	18th	3902	
2005	Richard Childress Racing	31	Chevy	DAY; 29	CAL; 19	LVS; 17	ATL; 15	BRI; 36	MAR; 16	TEX; 12	PHO; 3	TAL; 10	DAR; 21	RCH; 16	CLT; 22	DOV; 12	POC; 19	MCH; 11	SON; 30	DAY; 11	CHI; 30	NHA; 14	POC; 37	IND; 20	GLN; 43	MCH; 26	BRI; 2	CAL; 35	RCH; 18	NHA; 9	DOV; 11	TAL; 35	KAN; 28	CLT; 14	MAR; 5	ATL; 8	TEX; 30	PHO; 15	HOM; 25	18th	3803	
2006	Richard Childress Racing	31	Chevy	**DAY**; 32	CAL; 5	LVS; 7	ATL; 35	BRI; 34	MAR; 33	TEX; 6	PHO; 9	TAL; 4	RCH; 15	DAR; 9	CLT; 6	DOV; 4	POC; 9	MCH; 11	SON; 7	DAY; 15	**CHI**; 2	NHA; 7	POC; 9	**IND**; 15*	GLN; 11	**MCH**; 42	BRI; 9*	CAL; 16	RCH; 9	NHA; 7	DOV; 1	KAN; 5	TAL; 27	CLT; 3	MAR; 42	ATL; 13	TEX; 38	PHO; 10	HOM; 14	7th	6228	
2007	Richard Childress Racing	31	Chevy	DAY; 3	CAL; 4	LVS; 15	ATL; 4	BRI; 2	MAR; 6	TEX; 1	PHO; 13	TAL; 34	RCH; 43	DAR; 10	CLT; 24	DOV; 12	POC; 13	MCH; 24	SON; 3	NHA; 7	DAY; 16	CHI; 7	IND; 8	POC; 11	GLN; 40	MCH; 14	BRI; 12	CAL; 4	RCH; 18	NHA; 18	DOV; 7	KAN; 36	TAL; 43	CLT; 4	MAR; 12	ATL; 5	TEX; 6	PHO; 9	HOM; 8	8th	6231	
2008	Richard Childress Racing	31	Chevy	DAY; 13	CAL; 12	LVS; 5	ATL; 10	BRI; 1	MAR; 3	TEX; 6	PHO; 6	TAL; 12	RCH; 11	DAR; 10	CLT; 6	DOV; 8	POC; 5	MCH; 15	SON; 13	NHA; 12	DAY; 37	CHI; 19	IND; 9	POC; 21	GLN; 17	MCH; 11	BRI; 42	CAL; 17	RCH; 6	NHA; 4	DOV; 9	KAN; 7	TAL; 4	CLT; 1	MAR; 17	ATL; 18	TEX; 13	PHO; 9	HOM; 40	6th	6335	
2009	Richard Childress Racing	31	Chevy	DAY; 28	CAL; 32	LVS; 3	ATL; 14	BRI; 8	MAR; 15	TEX; 9	PHO; 15	TAL; 10	RCH; 3	DAR; 12	CLT; 25	DOV; 16	POC; 9	MCH; 26	SON; 34	NHA; 31	DAY; 16	CHI; 37	IND; 25	POC; 21	GLN; 38	MCH; 18	BRI; 34	ATL; 18	RCH; 16	NHA; 16	DOV; 16	KAN; 23	CAL; 30	CLT; 14	MAR; 15	TAL; 5	TEX; 9	PHO; 2	HOM; 2	17th	4022	
2010	Richard Childress Racing	31	Chevy	DAY; 11	CAL; 3	LVS; 11	ATL; 20	BRI; 10	MAR; 20	PHO; 25	TEX; 12	TAL; 32*	RCH; 4	DAR; 8	DOV; 2	CLT; 25	POC; 7	MCH; 8	SON; 27	NHA; 12	DAY; 5	CHI; 7	IND; 8	POC; 8	GLN; 9	MCH; 24	BRI; 16	ATL; 4	RCH; 13	NHA; 15	DOV; 2	KAN; 18	CAL; 23	CLT; 20	MAR; 9*	TAL; 41	TEX; 36	PHO; 19	HOM; 31	12th	6033	
2011	Richard Childress Racing	31	Chevy	DAY; 36	PHO; 26	LVS; 21	BRI; 20	CAL; 15	MAR; 24	TEX; 11	TAL; 16	RCH; 16	DAR; 33	DOV; 11	CLT; 21	KAN; 25	POC; 20	MCH; 24	SON; 21	DAY; 21	KEN; 19	NHA; 16	IND; 35	POC; 17	GLN; 9	MCH; 17	BRI; 15	ATL; 13	RCH; 29	CHI; 15	NHA; 13	DOV; 11	KAN; 21	CLT; 18	TAL; 2	MAR; 6	TEX; 27	PHO; 4	HOM; 10	20th	935	
2012	Richard Childress Racing	31	Chevy	DAY; 5	PHO; 33	LVS; 14	BRI; 6	CAL; 22	MAR; 22	TEX; 29	KAN; 22	RCH; 31	TAL; 10	DAR; 18	CLT; 19	DOV; 22	POC; 15	MCH; 21	SON; 11	KEN; 24	DAY; 2	NHA; 21	IND; 32	POC; 22	GLN; 30	MCH; 19	BRI; 33	ATL; 12	RCH; 6	CHI; 24	NHA; 15	DOV; 27	TAL; 10	CLT; 28	KAN; 28	MAR; 22	TEX; 19	PHO; 13	HOM; 19	19th	883	
2013	Richard Childress Racing	31	Chevy	DAY; 30	PHO; 10	LVS; 26	BRI; 32	CAL; 17	MAR; 18	TEX; 23	KAN; 18	RCH; 5	TAL; 28	DAR; 21	CLT; 12	DOV; 11	POC; 11	MCH; 10	SON; 31	KEN; 19	DAY; 16	NHA; 3	IND; 43	POC; 36	GLN; 26	MCH; 8	BRI; 13	ATL; 34	RCH; 18	CHI; 14	NHA; 8	DOV; 14	KAN; 12	CLT; 21	TAL; 21	MAR; 11	TEX; 24	PHO; 17	HOM; 23	20th	906	
2014	Michael Waltrip Racing	66	Toyota	DAY	PHO	LVS; 17	BRI	CAL	MAR	TEX	DAR	RCH	TAL	KAN	CLT	DOV	POC	MCH	SON	KEN	DAY	NHA; 20	IND	POC	GLN															41st	87	
2014	Stewart–Haas Racing	14	Chevy																							MCH; 37	BRI; 15	ATL	RCH	CHI	NHA	DOV	KAN	CLT	TAL	MAR	TEX	PHO	HOM	41st	87	

===== Daytona 500 =====
Year	Team	Manufacturer	Start	Finish
1994	Stavola Brothers Racing	Ford	35	26
1995	Stavola Brothers Racing	Ford	28	24
1996	Roush Racing	Ford	16	5
1997	Roush Racing	Ford	23	11
1998	Roush Racing	Ford	14	40
1999	Roush Racing	Ford	5	35
2000	Roush Racing	Ford	14	2
2001	Roush Racing	Ford	8	19
2002	Roush Racing	Ford	33	12
2003	Roush Racing	Ford	9	11
2004	Roush Racing	Ford	11	42
2005	Richard Childress Racing	Chevrolet	6	29
2006	Richard Childress Racing	Chevrolet	**1**	32
2007	Richard Childress Racing	Chevrolet	7	3
2008	Richard Childress Racing	Chevrolet	36	13
2009	Richard Childress Racing	Chevrolet	26	28
2010	Richard Childress Racing	Chevrolet	39	11
2011	Richard Childress Racing	Chevrolet	4	36
2012	Richard Childress Racing	Chevrolet	9	5
2013	Richard Childress Racing	Chevrolet	18	30

==== Nationwide Series ====
NASCAR Nationwide Series results
Year	Team	No.	Make	1	2	3	4	5	6	7	8	9	10	11	12	13	14	15	16	17	18	19	20	21	22	23	24	25	26	27	28	29	30	31	32	33	34	35	NNSC	Pts	Ref
1988	Burton Autosports	64	Chevy	DAY	HCY	CAR	MAR; 28	DAR	BRI	LNG	NZH	SBO; 17	NSV	CLT	DOV	ROU; 11	LAN	LVL	MYB	OXF																			40th	569	
1988	Burton Autosports	64	Olds																		SBO; 11	HCY	LNG	IRP	ROU; 15	BRI	DAR	RCH	DOV	MAR	CLT	CAR	MAR						40th	569	
1989	Burton Autosports	12	Pontiac	DAY	CAR; 19	MAR; 10	HCY; 12	DAR; 20	BRI; 26	NZH; 21	SBO; 11	LAN; 9	NSV; 11	CLT; 15	DOV; 27	ROU; 8	LVL; 16	VOL; 14	MYB; 4	SBO; 23	HCY; 26	DUB; 26	IRP; 16	ROU; 7	BRI; 31	DAR; 25	RCH	DOV; 22	MAR; 3	CLT; 21	CAR; 39	MAR; 26							13th	2967	
1990	Ard Motorsports	12	Buick	DAY; 19	RCH; 11	CAR; 13	MAR; 11	HCY; 15	DAR; 9	BRI; 23	LAN; 11	SBO; 2	NZH; 16	HCY; 28	CLT; 28	DOV; 30	**ROU**; 5	VOL; 27	MYB; 13	OXF; 21	NHA; 11	SBO; 20	DUB; 27	IRP; 35	ROU; 12	BRI; 28	DAR; 19	RCH; 27	DOV; 22	MAR; 1	CLT; 37	NHA; 9	CAR; 29	MAR; 22					15th	3342	
1991	J&J Racing	99	Chevy	DAY; 24	**RCH**; 31	CAR; 8	MAR; 27	VOL; 17	HCY; DNQ	DAR; 8	**BRI**; 13		SBO; 1*	NZH; 29		DOV; 11	ROU; 5	HCY; 25	MYB; 15	GLN; 4	OXF; 6	NHA; 20	SBO; 21	DUB; 15	IRP; 30	ROU; 24	BRI; 9	DAR; 15	RCH; 30	DOV; 14	CLT; 14	NHA; 7	CAR; 34	MAR; 7					12th	3533	
1991	Laughlin Racing	45	Pontiac						HCY; 29						CLT; 27																								12th	3533	
1991	J&J Racing	99	Buick									LAN; 7																											12th	3533	
1992	FILMAR Racing	8	Olds	DAY; 20	CAR; 19	RCH; 31	ATL; 26	MAR; 23	DAR; 15	BRI; 14	HCY; 14	LAN; 7	DUB; 26	NZH; 27	CLT; 14	DOV; 2	ROU; 10	MYB; 22	GLN; 9	VOL; 22	NHA; 1	TAL; 20	IRP; 11	ROU; 5	MCH; 34	NHA; 8	BRI; 3	DAR; 17	RCH; 6		CLT; 34	MAR; 6	CAR; 23	HCY; 18					9th	3609	
1992	FILMAR Racing	8	Ford																											DOV; 18									9th	3609	
1993	FILMAR Racing	8	Ford	DAY; 6	CAR; 31	RCH; 3	DAR; 39	BRI; 7	HCY; 20	ROU; 8	MAR; 7	NZH; 28	CLT; 9	DOV; 3	MYB; 1*	GLN; 33	MLW; 6*	TAL; 21	IRP; 8	MCH; 27	NHA; 24	BRI; 33	DAR; 24	RCH; 35	DOV; 11	ROU; 26	CLT; 18	MAR; 22	CAR; 22	HCY; 23	ATL; 39								14th	3030	
1996	Key Motorsports	05	Ford	DAY	CAR	RCH	ATL	NSV	DAR	BRI	HCY	NZH	CLT; 42	DOV	SBO	MYB	GLN	MLW	NHA	TAL	IRP	MCH	BRI	DAR	RCH	DOV	CLT	CAR	HOM										106th	37	
1997	Roush Racing	9	Ford	DAY; 40	CAR	RCH; 6*	ATL; 14	LVS	DAR; 2	HCY	TEX; 3	BRI; 1*	NSV	TAL	NHA	NZH	CLT; 13	DOV; 2	SBO	GLN	MLW	MYB	GTY	IRP	MCH; 4	BRI	DAR; 1*	RCH; 3*	DOV	CLT; 4	CAL	**CAR**; 4*	HOM						26th	1948	
1998	Roush Racing	9	Ford	DAY; 22	CAR; 4*	LVS; 4	NSV	**DAR**; 2*	BRI; 39	TEX; 10	HCY	TAL	NHA	NZH	CLT; 22	DOV	RCH; 1	PPR	GLN	MLW	MYB	CAL	SBO	IRP	**MCH**; 1*	BRI	DAR	RCH; 2	DOV	CLT; 6	GTY	CAR; 13	ATL	HOM; 1					30th	1883	
1999	Roush Racing	9	Ford	DAY; 9	CAR; 1	LVS; 3	ATL	DAR; 6	TEX; 2	NSV	BRI	TAL	CAL; 2	NHA	RCH; 2	NZH	CLT; 4	DOV	SBO	GLN	MLW	MYB	PPR	GTY	IRP	MCH; 7	BRI	DAR; 7	**RCH**; 35	DOV	CLT; 14	CAR	MEM	PHO; 4	HOM; 8				25th	2091	
2000	Roush Racing	9	Ford	DAY	CAR; 5	LVS; 1*	ATL	DAR; 3*	BRI	TEX; 6	NSV	TAL	CAL; 2	RCH; 41	NHA	CLT; 1*	DOV	SBO	MYB	GLN	MLW	NZH	PPR	GTY	IRP	MCH; 3	BRI	DAR; 2*	RCH; 1*	DOV	CLT; 10	CAR; 2*	MEM	PHO; 1*	HOM; 5				29th	2259	
2001	Roush Racing	9	Ford	DAY	CAR	LVS; 6	ATL	DAR	BRI	TEX; 2	NSH	TAL	CAL	RCH	NHA	NZH	CLT; 7	DOV	KEN	MLW	GLN	CHI; 3	GTY	PPR	IRP	MCH; 10	BRI	DAR; 1*	RCH; 9	DOV	KAN; 31	**CLT**; 3	MEM	PHO; 9	CAR	HOM; 13			33rd	1600	
2002	Roush Racing	9	Ford	DAY	CAR	**LVS**; 1*	**DAR**; 1*	BRI	TEX; 10	NSH	TAL	CAL; 15	RCH	NHA; 41	NZH	CLT; 30	DOV	NSH	KEN	MLW	DAY	CHI; 3*	GTY	PPR	IRP	MCH; 2	BRI	DAR; 1	RCH; 3	DOV	KAN; 1	CLT; 1*	MEM	ATL	CAR	PHO; 17	HOM		31st	1907	
2003	Roush Racing	9	Ford	DAY	CAR	LVS; 35	DAR	BRI	TEX	TAL	NSH	CAL	RCH	GTY	NZH	CLT	DOV	NSH	KEN	MLW	DAY	CHI	NHA; 16	PPR	IRP	MCH; 20	BRI	DAR	RCH	DOV	KAN								76th	330	
2003	Reiser Enterprises	17	Ford																													CLT; 38	MEM	ATL	PHO	CAR	HOM		76th	330	
2004	Roush Racing	9	Ford	DAY	CAR	LVS	DAR; 2	BRI	TEX; 9	NSH	TAL	CAL; 16	GTY	RCH	NZH	CLT	DOV	NSH	KEN	MLW	DAY	CHI; 3	NHA	PPR	IRP	MCH	BRI	CAL	RCH	DOV	KAN	CLT	MEM	ATL	PHO	DAR	HOM		57th	598	
2005	Richard Childress Racing	21	Chevy	DAY	CAL	MXC	LVS	ATL	NSH	BRI; 2*	TEX	PHO	TAL	DAR; 5	RCH	CLT	DOV	NSH	KEN	MLW	DAY	CHI	NHA	PPR	GTY	IRP	GLN; 6	MCH	BRI			DOV; 27	KAN	CLT	MEM	TEX	PHO	HOM	58th	692	
2005	Richard Childress Racing	29	Chevy																											CAL; 16	RCH								58th	692	
2006	Richard Childress Racing	21	Chevy	DAY; 30	CAL; 4	MXC	LVS	ATL; 1*	BRI	TEX; 6	NSH	PHO	TAL																					CLT; 35	MEM				28th	2040	
2006	Richard Childress Racing	29	Chevy											RCH; 2	DAR	CLT; 6	DOV; 1	NSH	KEN	MLW	DAY	CHI; 3				IRP; 5	GLN	MCH; 10	BRI; 33	CAL	**RCH**; 40	DOV	KAN; 40			TEX; 3	PHO	HOM	28th	2040	
2006	Kevin Harvick Incorporated	77	Chevy																				NHA; 21	MAR	GTY														28th	2040	
2007	Richard Childress Racing	29	Chevy	DAY	CAL; 7	MXC	LVS; 1	ATL; 1	BRI	NSH	TEX; 10	PHO; 3	TAL	RCH; 3*	DAR; 4	CLT; 4	DOV; 19	NSH	KEN	MLW	NHA	DAY	CHI; 3	GTY	IRP	CGV; 10	GLN; 2	MCH; 4	BRI; 40	CAL; 1	RCH	DOV	KAN; 8	CLT; 1*	MEM	TEX; 8	PHO	HOM; 1	15th	3002	
2008	Richard Childress Racing	29	Chevy	DAY	**CAL**; 8	LVS; 24	**ATL**; 3	BRI	NSH	TEX; 2	PHO; 31	MXC	TAL	RCH	DAR; 21	CLT; 8	DOV	NSH	KEN	MLW	NHA	DAY	CHI; 8	GTY	IRP	CGV	GLN; 14	MCH	BRI	CAL; 4	RCH	DOV	KAN; 14	CLT; 2	MEM	TEX	PHO	HOM; 35	32nd	1712	
2009	Richard Childress Racing	29	Chevy	DAY	CAL; 6	LVS; 10	BRI	TEX; 8	NSH	PHO; 20	TAL	RCH; 31	DAR; 8	CLT; 9	DOV	NSH	KEN	MLW	NHA	DAY	CHI; 11	GTY	IRP	IOW	GLN; 6	MCH; 9	BRI	CGV	ATL; 5	RCH	DOV	KAN	CAL	CLT; 9	MEM	TEX	PHO	HOM; 3	28th	1775	

==== Craftsman Truck Series ====
NASCAR Craftsman Truck Series results
Year	Team	No.	Make	1	2	3	4	5	6	7	8	9	10	11	12	13	14	15	16	17	18	19	20	21	22	23	24	NCTSC	Pts	Ref
1996	Roush Racing	99	Ford	HOM	PHO	POR	EVG	TUS	CNS	HPT; 8	BRI	NZH; 4	MLW	LVL	I70	IRP; 14	FLM	GLN	NSV	RCH	NHA	MAR; 8	NWS	SON	MMR	PHO	LVS	42nd	565	

^{*} Season still in progress
^{1} Ineligible for series points

=== International Race of Champions ===
(key) (Bold – Pole position. * – Most laps led.)

International Race of Champions results
Year	Make	1	2	3	4	IROC	Pts	Ref
1998	Pontiac	DAY; 2	CAL; 5	MCH; 1	IND; 12	2nd	57	
1999	Pontiac	DAY; 12	**TAL**; 11	**MCH**; 6	IND; 7	11th	26	
2000	Pontiac	DAY; 3	TAL; 4	MCH; 12	IND; 12	7th	35	
2001	Pontiac	DAY; 10	TAL; 6	MCH; 7	**IND**; 10*	8th	32	

Achievements
Preceded by Jeff Gordon; Matt Kenseth	Coca-Cola 600 Winner; 1999; 2001	Succeeded by Matt Kenseth; Mark Martin
Preceded by Jeff Gordon	Southern 500 Winner; 1999	Succeeded by Bobby Labonte
Awards
Preceded by Jeff Gordon	NASCAR Rookie of the Year; 1994	Succeeded by Ricky Craven
