= 1999 The 50th Pepsi Southern 500 =

Race details
- Race 24 of 34 in the 1999 NASCAR Winston Cup Series
- 1999 Southern 500 program cover
- Date: September 5, 1999
- Official name: The 50th Pepsi Southern 500
- Location: Darlington Raceway, Darlington County, South Carolina
- Course: Permanent racing facility
- Course length: 1.366 miles (2.198 km)
- Distance: 270 laps, 368.82 mi (593.558 km)
- Scheduled distance: 367 laps, 501.322 mi (806.800 km)
- Weather: Temperatures reaching up to 87.8 °F (31.0 °C); wind speeds up to 18.3 miles per hour (29.5 km/h)
- Average speed: 107.816 miles per hour (173.513 km/h)

Pole position
Driver	Kenny Irwin Jr.	Robert Yates Racing
- Time: 28.763

Most laps led
Driver	Jeff Burton	Roush Racing
- Laps: 89

Winner
No. 99	Jeff Burton	Roush Racing

Television in the United States
- Network: ESPN
- Announcers: Bob Jenkins, Ned Jarrett and Benny Parsons

The 1999 The 50th Pepsi Southern 500, the 50th running of the event, was a NASCAR Winston Cup Series race held on September 5, 1999, at Darlington Raceway in Darlington County, South Carolina. Contested over 270 laps – shortened from 367 laps due to rain – on the 1.366-mile (2.198-kilometre) speedway, it was the 24th race of the 1999 NASCAR Winston Cup Series season. Jeff Burton of Roush Racing won the race, and the No Bull 5 Million Dollar Bonus as well.

Kenny Irwin Jr. would earn his final pole position while qualifying for this event.

== Top ten results ==
Pos	No.	Driver	Team	Manufacturer	Laps led
1	99	Jeff Burton	Roush Racing	Ford	89
2	22	Ward Burton	Bill Davis Racing	Pontiac	30
3	12	Jeremy Mayfield	Penske-Kranefuss Racing	Ford	69
4	6	Mark Martin	Roush Racing	Ford	2
5	16	Kevin Lepage	Roush Racing	Ford	0
6	42	Joe Nemechek	Team SABCO	Chevrolet	1
7	4	Bobby Hamilton	Morgan-McClure Motorsports	Chevrolet	0
8	2	Rusty Wallace	Penske-Kranefuss Racing	Ford	0
9	33	Ken Schrader	Andy Petree Racing	Pontiac	0
10	1	Steve Park	Dale Earnhardt, Inc.	Chevrolet	0

== Race statistics ==
- Time of race: 3:25:15
- Average speed: 107.816 miles per hour (173.513 km/h)
- Pole speed: 170.970 miles per hour (275.150 km/h)
- Cautions: 6 for 62 laps
- Margin of victory: under caution
- Lead changes: 20
- Percent of race run under caution: 23%
- Average green flag run: 34.7 laps
