= 1995 GM Goodwrench Dealer 400 =

21st race of the 1995 NASCAR Winston Cup Series

Race details
- Race 21 of 31 in the 1995 NASCAR Winston Cup Series
- The 1995 GM Goodwrench Dealer 400 program cover, featuring Dale Earnhardt.
- Date: August 20, 1995
- Official name: 26th Annual GM Goodwrench Dealer 400
- Location: Brooklyn, Michigan, Michigan International Speedway
- Course: Permanent racing facility
- Course length: 2 miles (3.2 km)
- Distance: 200 laps, 400 mi (643.737 km)
- Scheduled distance: 200 laps, 400 mi (643.737 km)
- Average speed: 157.739 miles per hour (253.856 km/h)

Pole position
Driver	Bobby Labonte	Joe Gibbs Racing
- Time: 39.045

Most laps led
Driver	Jeff Gordon	Hendrick Motorsports
- Laps: 68

Winner
No. 18	Bobby Labonte	Joe Gibbs Racing

Television in the United States
- Network: NASCAR on ESPN
- Announcers: Bob Jenkins, Ned Jarrett, Benny Parsons

Radio in the United States
- Radio: Motor Racing Network

The 1995 GM Goodwrench Dealer 400 was the 21st stock car race of the 1995 NASCAR Winston Cup Series and the 26th iteration of the event. The race was held on Sunday, August 20, 1995, in Brooklyn, Michigan, at Michigan International Speedway, a two-mile (3.2 km) moderate-banked D-shaped speedway. The race took the scheduled 200 laps to complete. Gambling on a fuel strategy, Joe Gibbs Racing driver Bobby Labonte would decide to run the final 55 laps on one tank of fuel. He would then capture the lead with 15 to go, taking his third career NASCAR Winston Cup Series victory and his third and final victory of the season. To fill out the top three, Terry Labonte and Jeff Gordon, both drivers for Hendrick Motorsports, would finish second and third, respectively.

== Background ==
The layout of Michigan International Speedway, the venue where the race was held.

The race was held at Michigan International Speedway, a two-mile (3.2 km) moderate-banked D-shaped speedway located in Brooklyn, Michigan. The track is used primarily for NASCAR events. It is known as a "sister track" to Texas World Speedway as MIS's oval design was a direct basis of TWS, with moderate modifications to the banking in the corners, and was used as the basis of Auto Club Speedway. The track is owned by International Speedway Corporation. Michigan International Speedway is recognized as one of motorsports' premier facilities because of its wide racing surface and high banking (by open-wheel standards; the 18-degree banking is modest by stock car standards).

=== Entry list ===
- (R) denotes rookie driver.

#	Driver	Team	Make
1	Rick Mast	Precision Products Racing	Pontiac
2	Rusty Wallace	Penske Racing South	Ford
02	Tim Steele	H. S. Die Racing Team	Ford
3	Dale Earnhardt	Richard Childress Racing	Chevrolet
4	Sterling Marlin	Morgan–McClure Motorsports	Chevrolet
5	Terry Labonte	Hendrick Motorsports	Chevrolet
6	Mark Martin	Roush Racing	Ford
7	Geoff Bodine	Geoff Bodine Racing	Ford
8	Jeff Burton	Stavola Brothers Racing	Ford
9	Lake Speed	Melling Racing	Ford
10	Ricky Rudd	Rudd Performance Motorsports	Ford
11	Brett Bodine	Junior Johnson & Associates	Ford
12	Derrike Cope	Bobby Allison Motorsports	Ford
15	Dick Trickle	Bud Moore Engineering	Ford
16	Ted Musgrave	Roush Racing	Ford
17	Darrell Waltrip	Darrell Waltrip Motorsports	Chevrolet
18	Bobby Labonte	Joe Gibbs Racing	Chevrolet
21	Morgan Shepherd	Wood Brothers Racing	Ford
22	Jimmy Hensley	Bill Davis Racing	Pontiac
23	Jimmy Spencer	Haas-Carter Motorsports	Ford
24	Jeff Gordon	Hendrick Motorsports	Chevrolet
25	Ken Schrader	Hendrick Motorsports	Chevrolet
26	Hut Stricklin	King Racing	Ford
27	Elton Sawyer	Junior Johnson & Associates	Ford
28	Dale Jarrett	Robert Yates Racing	Ford
29	Steve Grissom	Diamond Ridge Motorsports	Chevrolet
30	Michael Waltrip	Bahari Racing	Pontiac
31	Ward Burton	A.G. Dillard Motorsports	Chevrolet
32	Greg Sacks	Active Motorsports	Chevrolet
33	Robert Pressley (R)	Leo Jackson Motorsports	Chevrolet
37	John Andretti	Kranefuss-Haas Racing	Ford
40	Rich Bickle	Dick Brooks Racing	Pontiac
41	Ricky Craven (R)	Larry Hedrick Motorsports	Chevrolet
42	Kyle Petty	Team SABCO	Pontiac
43	Bobby Hamilton	Petty Enterprises	Pontiac
71	Dave Marcis	Marcis Auto Racing	Chevrolet
72	Tracy Leslie	Parker Racing	Chevrolet
75	Todd Bodine	Butch Mock Motorsports	Ford
77	Bobby Hillin Jr.	Jasper Motorsports	Ford
81	Kenny Wallace	FILMAR Racing	Ford
87	Joe Nemechek	NEMCO Motorsports	Chevrolet
88	Gary Bradberry	Bradberry Racing	Chevrolet
90	Mike Wallace	Donlavey Racing	Ford
94	Bill Elliott	Elliott-Hardy Racing	Ford
95	Loy Allen Jr.	Sadler Brothers Racing	Ford
98	Jeremy Mayfield	Cale Yarborough Motorsports	Ford

== Qualifying ==
Qualifying was split into two rounds. The first round was held on Friday, August 18, at 3:30 PM EST. Each driver would have one lap to set a time. During the first round, the top 20 drivers in the round would be guaranteed a starting spot in the race. If a driver was not able to guarantee a spot in the first round, they had the option to scrub their time from the first round and try and run a faster lap time in a second round qualifying run, held on Saturday, August 19, at 10:30 AM EST. As with the first round, each driver would have one lap to set a time. For this specific race, positions 21-38 would be decided on time, and depending on who needed it, a select amount of positions were given to cars who had not otherwise qualified but were high enough in owner's points.

Bobby Labonte, driving for Joe Gibbs Racing, would win the pole, setting a time of 39.045 and an average speed of 184.403 miles per hour (296.768 km/h) in the first round.

Four drivers would fail to qualify.

=== Full qualifying results ===
Pos.	#	Driver	Team	Make	Time	Speed
1	18	Bobby Labonte	Joe Gibbs Racing	Chevrolet	39.045	184.403
2	10	Ricky Rudd	Rudd Performance Motorsports	Ford	39.117	184.063
3	6	Mark Martin	Roush Racing	Ford	39.211	183.622
4	37	John Andretti	Kranefuss-Haas Racing	Ford	39.258	183.402
5	11	Brett Bodine	Junior Johnson & Associates	Ford	39.378	182.843
6	94	Bill Elliott	Elliott-Hardy Racing	Ford	39.383	182.820
7	15	Dick Trickle	Bud Moore Engineering	Ford	39.404	182.723
8	3	Dale Earnhardt	Richard Childress Racing	Chevrolet	39.460	182.463
9	98	Jeremy Mayfield	Cale Yarborough Motorsports	Ford	39.474	182.399
10	81	Kenny Wallace	FILMAR Racing	Ford	39.485	182.348
11	43	Bobby Hamilton	Petty Enterprises	Pontiac	39.552	182.039
12	8	Jeff Burton	Stavola Brothers Racing	Ford	39.565	181.979
13	5	Terry Labonte	Hendrick Motorsports	Chevrolet	39.574	181.938
14	4	Sterling Marlin	Morgan–McClure Motorsports	Chevrolet	39.592	181.855
15	31	Ward Burton	A.G. Dillard Motorsports	Chevrolet	39.697	181.374
16	41	Ricky Craven (R)	Larry Hedrick Motorsports	Chevrolet	39.709	181.319
17	28	Dale Jarrett	Robert Yates Racing	Ford	39.753	181.118
18	87	Joe Nemechek	NEMCO Motorsports	Chevrolet	39.757	181.100
19	7	Geoff Bodine	Geoff Bodine Racing	Ford	39.765	181.064
20	27	Elton Sawyer	Junior Johnson & Associates	Ford	39.812	180.850
Failed to lock in Round 1
21	24	Jeff Gordon	Hendrick Motorsports	Chevrolet	39.778	181.005
22	9	Lake Speed	Melling Racing	Ford	39.802	180.895
23	77	Bobby Hillin Jr.	Jasper Motorsports	Ford	39.823	180.800
24	2	Rusty Wallace	Penske Racing South	Ford	39.844	180.705
25	30	Michael Waltrip	Bahari Racing	Pontiac	39.847	180.691
26	12	Derrike Cope	Bobby Allison Motorsports	Ford	39.852	180.668
27	90	Mike Wallace	Donlavey Racing	Ford	39.869	180.591
28	21	Morgan Shepherd	Wood Brothers Racing	Ford	39.896	180.469
29	88	Gary Bradberry	Bradberry Racing	Chevrolet	39.909	180.410
30	29	Steve Grissom	Diamond Ridge Motorsports	Chevrolet	39.931	180.311
31	16	Ted Musgrave	Roush Racing	Ford	39.940	180.270
32	17	Darrell Waltrip	Darrell Waltrip Motorsports	Chevrolet	39.952	180.216
33	33	Robert Pressley (R)	Leo Jackson Motorsports	Chevrolet	39.956	180.198
34	32	Greg Sacks	Active Motorsports	Chevrolet	39.963	180.167
35	25	Ken Schrader	Hendrick Motorsports	Chevrolet	39.969	180.140
36	23	Jimmy Spencer	Travis Carter Enterprises	Ford	40.008	179.964
37	1	Rick Mast	Precision Products Racing	Ford	40.010	179.955
38	26	Hut Stricklin	King Racing	Ford	40.061	179.726
Provisionals
39	42	Kyle Petty	Team SABCO	Pontiac	40.313	178.602
40	75	Todd Bodine	Butch Mock Motorsports	Ford	40.242	178.918
41	22	Jimmy Hensley	Bill Davis Racing	Pontiac	40.600	177.340
42	71	Dave Marcis	Marcis Auto Racing	Chevrolet	40.295	178.682
Failed to qualify
43	40	Rich Bickle	Dick Brooks Racing	Pontiac	40.081	179.636
44	72	Tracy Leslie	Parker Racing	Chevrolet	40.313	178.602
45	02	Tim Steele	H. S. Die Racing Team	Ford	40.611	177.292
46	95	Loy Allen Jr.	Sadler Brothers Racing	Ford	41.013	175.554
Official first round qualifying results
Official starting lineup

== Race results ==
Fin	St	#	Driver	Team	Make	Laps	Led	Status	Pts	Winnings
1	1	18	Bobby Labonte	Joe Gibbs Racing	Chevrolet	200	17	running	180	$97,445
2	13	5	Terry Labonte	Hendrick Motorsports	Chevrolet	200	0	running	170	$52,695
3	21	24	Jeff Gordon	Hendrick Motorsports	Chevrolet	200	68	running	175	$46,420
4	14	4	Sterling Marlin	Morgan–McClure Motorsports	Chevrolet	200	0	running	160	$38,170
5	24	2	Rusty Wallace	Penske Racing South	Ford	200	3	running	160	$37,690
6	15	31	Ward Burton	A.G. Dillard Motorsports	Chevrolet	200	0	running	150	$29,590
7	16	41	Ricky Craven (R)	Larry Hedrick Motorsports	Chevrolet	200	0	running	146	$23,490
8	11	43	Bobby Hamilton	Petty Enterprises	Pontiac	200	0	running	142	$21,140
9	6	94	Bill Elliott	Elliott-Hardy Racing	Ford	199	28	running	143	$20,290
10	38	26	Hut Stricklin	King Racing	Ford	199	0	running	134	$24,940
11	25	30	Michael Waltrip	Bahari Racing	Pontiac	199	0	running	130	$23,640
12	9	98	Jeremy Mayfield	Cale Yarborough Motorsports	Ford	199	0	running	127	$18,140
13	7	15	Dick Trickle	Bud Moore Engineering	Ford	199	0	running	124	$22,640
14	36	23	Jimmy Spencer	Travis Carter Enterprises	Ford	198	0	running	121	$17,140
15	32	17	Darrell Waltrip	Darrell Waltrip Motorsports	Chevrolet	198	0	running	118	$22,690
16	28	21	Morgan Shepherd	Wood Brothers Racing	Ford	197	1	running	120	$20,990
17	22	9	Lake Speed	Melling Racing	Ford	197	0	running	112	$15,640
18	33	33	Robert Pressley (R)	Leo Jackson Motorsports	Chevrolet	197	0	running	109	$20,840
19	40	75	Todd Bodine	Butch Mock Motorsports	Ford	197	0	running	106	$20,040
20	27	90	Mike Wallace	Donlavey Racing	Ford	197	0	running	103	$12,690
21	20	27	Elton Sawyer	Junior Johnson & Associates	Ford	197	0	running	100	$19,215
22	41	22	Jimmy Hensley	Bill Davis Racing	Pontiac	196	0	brakes	97	$19,415
23	12	8	Jeff Burton	Stavola Brothers Racing	Ford	196	0	running	94	$19,215
24	10	81	Kenny Wallace	FILMAR Racing	Ford	196	0	running	91	$10,915
25	42	71	Dave Marcis	Marcis Auto Racing	Chevrolet	194	0	running	88	$13,865
26	35	25	Ken Schrader	Hendrick Motorsports	Chevrolet	194	0	running	85	$18,565
27	19	7	Geoff Bodine	Geoff Bodine Racing	Ford	179	0	engine	82	$25,115
28	31	16	Ted Musgrave	Roush Racing	Ford	166	0	running	79	$18,465
29	30	29	Steve Grissom	Diamond Ridge Motorsports	Chevrolet	162	0	running	76	$12,865
30	2	10	Ricky Rudd	Rudd Performance Motorsports	Ford	160	46	valve	78	$23,615
31	37	1	Rick Mast	Precision Products Racing	Ford	138	0	crash	70	$15,165
32	18	87	Joe Nemechek	NEMCO Motorsports	Chevrolet	108	0	engine	67	$10,115
33	17	28	Dale Jarrett	Robert Yates Racing	Ford	101	36	camshaft	69	$35,465
34	26	12	Derrike Cope	Bobby Allison Motorsports	Ford	98	0	piston	61	$10,015
35	8	3	Dale Earnhardt	Richard Childress Racing	Chevrolet	87	0	timing belt	58	$29,965
36	5	11	Brett Bodine	Junior Johnson & Associates	Ford	75	0	engine	55	$22,940
37	4	37	John Andretti	Kranefuss-Haas Racing	Ford	73	1	engine	57	$10,040
38	3	6	Mark Martin	Roush Racing	Ford	52	0	timing chain	49	$24,015
39	23	77	Bobby Hillin Jr.	Jasper Motorsports	Ford	40	0	ignition	46	$9,840
40	34	32	Greg Sacks	Active Motorsports	Chevrolet	34	0	rear end	43	$9,840
41	29	88	Gary Bradberry	Bradberry Racing	Chevrolet	26	0	rear end	40	$9,840
42	39	42	Kyle Petty	Team SABCO	Pontiac	21	0	lifter	37	$14,840
Official race results

Previous race: 1995 The Bud at The Glen	NASCAR Winston Cup Series; 1995 season	Next race: 1995 Goody's 500 (Bristol)
