= 1995 The Bud at The Glen =

20th race of the 1995 NASCAR Winston Cup Series

Race details
- Race 20 of 31 in the 1995 NASCAR Winston Cup Series
- The 1995 The Bud at The Glen program cover.
- Date: August 13, 1995
- Official name: 10th Annual The Bud at The Glen
- Location: Watkins Glen, New York, Watkins Glen International
- Course: Permanent racing facility
- Course length: 2.45 miles (3.943 km)
- Distance: 90 laps, 220.5 mi (354.86 km)
- Scheduled distance: 90 laps, 220.5 mi (354.86 km)
- Average speed: 103.03 miles per hour (165.81 km/h)

Pole position
| Driver | Mark Martin | Roush Racing |
- Time: 1:13.249

Most laps led
| Driver | Mark Martin | Roush Racing |
- Laps: 61

Winner
| No. 6 | Mark Martin | Roush Racing |

Television in the United States
- Network: ESPN
- Announcers: Bob Jenkins, Ned Jarrett, Benny Parsons

Radio in the United States
- Radio: Motor Racing Network

The 1995 The Bud at The Glen was the 20th stock car race of the 1995 NASCAR Winston Cup Series and the 11th iteration of the event. The race was held on Sunday, August 13, 1995, in Watkins Glen, New York, at the shortened layout of Watkins Glen International, a 2.45-mile (3.94 km) permanent road course layout. The race took the scheduled 90 laps to complete. At race's end, Roush Racing driver Mark Martin would manage to dominate the majority of the race to take his 16th career NASCAR Winston Cup Series victory and his second victory of the season. To fill out the top three, Bill Davis Racing driver Wally Dallenbach Jr. and Hendrick Motorsports driver Jeff Gordon would finish second and third, respectively.

== Background ==
The layout of Watkins Glen International NASCAR uses.

Watkins Glen International (nicknamed "The Glen") is an automobile race track located in Watkins Glen, New York at the southern tip of Seneca Lake. It was long known around the world as the home of the Formula One United States Grand Prix, which it hosted for twenty consecutive years (1961–1980), but the site has been home to road racing of nearly every class, including the World Sportscar Championship, Trans-Am, Can-Am, NASCAR Sprint Cup Series, the International Motor Sports Association and the IndyCar Series.

Initially, public roads in the village were used for the race course. In 1956 a permanent circuit for the race was built. In 1968 the race was extended to six hours, becoming the 6 Hours of Watkins Glen. The circuit's current layout has more or less been the same since 1971, although a chicane was installed at the uphill Esses in 1975 to slow cars through these corners, where there was a fatality during practice at the 1973 United States Grand Prix. The chicane was removed in 1985, but another chicane called the "Inner Loop" was installed in 1992 after J. D. McDuffie's fatal accident during the previous year's NASCAR Winston Cup event.

The circuit is known as the Mecca of North American road racing and is a very popular venue among fans and drivers. The facility is currently owned by NASCAR.

=== Entry list ===
- (R) denotes rookie driver.

| No. | Driver | Team | Make |
|---|---|---|---|
| 1 | Rick Mast | Precision Products Racing | Pontiac |
| 2 | Rusty Wallace | Penske Racing South | Ford |
| 3 | Dale Earnhardt | Richard Childress Racing | Chevrolet |
| 4 | Sterling Marlin | Morgan–McClure Motorsports | Chevrolet |
| 5 | Terry Labonte | Hendrick Motorsports | Chevrolet |
| 6 | Mark Martin | Roush Racing | Ford |
| 7 | Geoff Bodine | Geoff Bodine Racing | Ford |
| 8 | Jeff Burton | Stavola Brothers Racing | Ford |
| 9 | Lake Speed | Melling Racing | Ford |
| 10 | Ricky Rudd | Rudd Performance Motorsports | Ford |
| 11 | Brett Bodine | Junior Johnson & Associates | Ford |
| 12 | Derrike Cope | Bobby Allison Motorsports | Ford |
| 15 | Dick Trickle | Bud Moore Engineering | Ford |
| 16 | Ted Musgrave | Roush Racing | Ford |
| 17 | Darrell Waltrip | Darrell Waltrip Motorsports | Chevrolet |
| 18 | Bobby Labonte | Joe Gibbs Racing | Chevrolet |
| 21 | Morgan Shepherd | Wood Brothers Racing | Ford |
| 22 | Wally Dallenbach Jr. | Bill Davis Racing | Pontiac |
| 23 | Jimmy Spencer | Haas-Carter Motorsports | Ford |
| 24 | Jeff Gordon | Hendrick Motorsports | Chevrolet |
| 25 | Ken Schrader | Hendrick Motorsports | Chevrolet |
| 26 | Hut Stricklin | King Racing | Ford |
| 27 | Elton Sawyer | Junior Johnson & Associates | Ford |
| 28 | Dale Jarrett | Robert Yates Racing | Ford |
| 29 | Steve Grissom | Diamond Ridge Motorsports | Chevrolet |
| 30 | Michael Waltrip | Bahari Racing | Pontiac |
| 31 | Ward Burton | A.G. Dillard Motorsports | Chevrolet |
| 33 | Robert Pressley (R) | Leo Jackson Motorsports | Chevrolet |
| 37 | John Andretti | Kranefuss-Haas Racing | Ford |
| 40 | Butch Leitzinger | Dick Brooks Racing | Pontiac |
| 41 | Ricky Craven (R) | Larry Hedrick Motorsports | Chevrolet |
| 42 | Kyle Petty | Team SABCO | Pontiac |
| 43 | Bobby Hamilton | Petty Enterprises | Pontiac |
| 49 | Eric Smith | Smith Racing | Ford |
| 61 | David Murry | Thompson Racing | Ford |
| 68 | Ron Fellows | Canaska Racing | Chevrolet |
| 71 | Dave Marcis | Marcis Auto Racing | Chevrolet |
| 75 | Todd Bodine | Butch Mock Motorsports | Ford |
| 77 | Bobby Hillin Jr. | Jasper Motorsports | Ford |
| 87 | Joe Nemechek | NEMCO Motorsports | Chevrolet |
| 90 | Mike Wallace | Donlavey Racing | Ford |
| 94 | Bill Elliott | Elliott-Hardy Racing | Ford |
| 98 | Jeremy Mayfield | Cale Yarborough Motorsports | Ford |

== Qualifying ==
Qualifying was split into two rounds. The first round was held on Friday, August 11, at 2:00 PM EST. Each driver would have one lap to set a time. During the first round, the top 20 drivers in the round would be guaranteed a starting spot in the race. If a driver was not able to guarantee a spot in the first round, they had the option to scrub their time from the first round and try and run a faster lap time in a second round qualifying run, held on Saturday, August 12, at 10:30 AM EST. As with the first round, each driver would have one lap to set a time. For this specific race, positions 21-36 would be decided on time, and depending on who needed it, a select amount of positions were given to cars who had not otherwise qualified but were high enough in owner's points; which was usually four. If needed, a past champion who did not qualify on either time or provisionals could use a champion's provisional, adding one more spot to the field.

Mark Martin, driving for Roush Racing, would win the pole, setting a time of 1:13.249 and an average speed of 120.411 mph (193.783 km/h).

Three drivers would fail to qualify.

=== Full qualifying results ===
| Pos. | No. | Driver | Team | Make | Time | Speed |
|---|---|---|---|---|---|---|
| 1 | 6 | Mark Martin | Roush Racing | Ford | 1:13.249 | 120.411 |
| 2 | 94 | Bill Elliott | Elliott-Hardy Racing | Ford | 1:13.297 | 120.332 |
| 3 | 5 | Terry Labonte | Hendrick Motorsports | Chevrolet | 1:13.385 | 120.188 |
| 4 | 2 | Rusty Wallace | Penske Racing South | Ford | 1:13.450 | 120.082 |
| 5 | 24 | Jeff Gordon | Hendrick Motorsports | Chevrolet | 1:13.497 | 120.005 |
| 6 | 30 | Michael Waltrip | Bahari Racing | Pontiac | 1:13.710 | 119.658 |
| 7 | 10 | Ricky Rudd | Rudd Performance Motorsports | Ford | 1:13.741 | 119.608 |
| 8 | 42 | Kyle Petty | Team SABCO | Pontiac | 1:13.835 | 119.456 |
| 9 | 98 | Jeremy Mayfield | Cale Yarborough Motorsports | Ford | 1:13.933 | 119.297 |
| 10 | 21 | Morgan Shepherd | Wood Brothers Racing | Ford | 1:13.946 | 119.276 |
| 11 | 18 | Bobby Labonte | Joe Gibbs Racing | Chevrolet | 1:13.950 | 119.270 |
| 12 | 22 | Wally Dallenbach Jr. | Bill Davis Racing | Pontiac | 1:14.016 | 119.163 |
| 13 | 28 | Dale Jarrett | Robert Yates Racing | Ford | 1:14.027 | 119.146 |
| 14 | 41 | Ricky Craven (R) | Larry Hedrick Motorsports | Chevrolet | 1:14.155 | 118.940 |
| 15 | 3 | Dale Earnhardt | Richard Childress Racing | Chevrolet | 1:14.204 | 118.862 |
| 16 | 25 | Ken Schrader | Hendrick Motorsports | Chevrolet | 1:14.259 | 118.773 |
| 17 | 37 | John Andretti | Kranefuss-Haas Racing | Ford | 1:14.263 | 118.767 |
| 18 | 23 | Jimmy Spencer | Travis Carter Enterprises | Ford | 1:14.347 | 118.633 |
| 19 | 87 | Joe Nemechek | NEMCO Motorsports | Chevrolet | 1:14.354 | 118.622 |
| 20 | 26 | Hut Stricklin | King Racing | Ford | 1:14.374 | 118.590 |
Failed to lock in Round 1
| 21 | 40 | Butch Leitzinger | Dick Brooks Racing | Pontiac | 1:14.281 | 118.738 |
| 22 | 33 | Robert Pressley (R) | Leo Jackson Motorsports | Chevrolet | 1:14.286 | 118.730 |
| 23 | 9 | Lake Speed | Melling Racing | Ford | 1:14.397 | 118.553 |
| 24 | 77 | Bobby Hillin Jr. | Jasper Motorsports | Ford | 1:14.432 | 118.497 |
| 25 | 8 | Jeff Burton | Stavola Brothers Racing | Ford | 1:14.441 | 118.483 |
| 26 | 16 | Ted Musgrave | Roush Racing | Ford | 1:14.488 | 118.408 |
| 27 | 17 | Darrell Waltrip | Darrell Waltrip Motorsports | Chevrolet | 1:14.542 | 118.323 |
| 28 | 11 | Brett Bodine | Junior Johnson & Associates | Ford | 1:14.563 | 118.289 |
| 29 | 71 | Dave Marcis | Marcis Auto Racing | Chevrolet | 1:14.592 | 118.243 |
| 30 | 7 | Geoff Bodine | Geoff Bodine Racing | Ford | 1:14.610 | 118.215 |
| 31 | 12 | Derrike Cope | Bobby Allison Motorsports | Ford | 1:14.633 | 118.178 |
| 32 | 4 | Sterling Marlin | Morgan–McClure Motorsports | Chevrolet | 1:14.700 | 118.072 |
| 33 | 1 | Rick Mast | Precision Products Racing | Ford | 1:14.793 | 117.925 |
| 34 | 27 | Elton Sawyer | Junior Johnson & Associates | Ford | 1:15.077 | 117.479 |
| 35 | 75 | Todd Bodine | Butch Mock Motorsports | Ford | 1:15.079 | 117.476 |
| 36 | 68 | Ron Fellows | Canaska Racing | Chevrolet | 1:15.168 | 117.337 |
Provisionals
| 37 | 43 | Bobby Hamilton | Petty Enterprises | Pontiac | 1:15.275 | 117.170 |
| 38 | 29 | Steve Grissom | Diamond Ridge Motorsports | Chevrolet | 1:15.190 | 117.303 |
| 39 | 15 | Dick Trickle | Bud Moore Engineering | Ford | 1:16.472 | 115.336 |
| 40 | 31 | Ward Burton | A.G. Dillard Motorsports | Chevrolet | 1:15.978 | 116.086 |
Failed to qualify
| 41 | 61 | David Murry | Thompson Racing | Ford | 1:15.307 | 117.121 |
| 42 | 90 | Mike Wallace | Donlavey Racing | Ford | 1:15.695 | 116.520 |
| 43 | 49 | Eric Smith | Smith Racing | Ford | 1:23.511 | 105.615 |
Official first round qualifying results
Official starting lineup

== Race results ==
| Fin | St | No. | Driver | Team | Make | Laps | Led | Status | Pts | Winnings |
|---|---|---|---|---|---|---|---|---|---|---|
| 1 | 1 | 6 | Mark Martin | Roush Racing | Ford | 90 | 61 | running | 185 | $95,290 |
| 2 | 12 | 22 | Wally Dallenbach Jr. | Bill Davis Racing | Pontiac | 90 | 21 | running | 175 | $54,140 |
| 3 | 5 | 24 | Jeff Gordon | Hendrick Motorsports | Chevrolet | 90 | 4 | running | 170 | $42,205 |
| 4 | 7 | 10 | Ricky Rudd | Rudd Performance Motorsports | Ford | 90 | 0 | running | 160 | $34,320 |
| 5 | 3 | 5 | Terry Labonte | Hendrick Motorsports | Chevrolet | 90 | 0 | running | 155 | $36,325 |
| 6 | 11 | 18 | Bobby Labonte | Joe Gibbs Racing | Chevrolet | 90 | 0 | running | 150 | $28,660 |
| 7 | 17 | 37 | John Andretti | Kranefuss-Haas Racing | Ford | 90 | 0 | running | 146 | $19,340 |
| 8 | 27 | 17 | Darrell Waltrip | Darrell Waltrip Motorsports | Chevrolet | 90 | 0 | running | 142 | $23,030 |
| 9 | 30 | 7 | Geoff Bodine | Geoff Bodine Racing | Ford | 90 | 0 | running | 138 | $29,500 |
| 10 | 14 | 41 | Ricky Craven (R) | Larry Hedrick Motorsports | Chevrolet | 90 | 0 | running | 134 | $21,410 |
| 11 | 2 | 94 | Bill Elliott | Elliott-Hardy Racing | Ford | 90 | 0 | running | 130 | $16,100 |
| 12 | 21 | 40 | Butch Leitzinger | Dick Brooks Racing | Pontiac | 90 | 0 | running | 127 | $17,060 |
| 13 | 26 | 16 | Ted Musgrave | Roush Racing | Ford | 90 | 0 | running | 124 | $20,570 |
| 14 | 6 | 30 | Michael Waltrip | Bahari Racing | Pontiac | 90 | 2 | running | 126 | $20,230 |
| 15 | 31 | 12 | Derrike Cope | Bobby Allison Motorsports | Ford | 90 | 0 | running | 118 | $16,040 |
| 16 | 28 | 11 | Brett Bodine | Junior Johnson & Associates | Ford | 90 | 0 | running | 115 | $23,820 |
| 17 | 13 | 28 | Dale Jarrett | Robert Yates Racing | Ford | 90 | 0 | running | 112 | $25,100 |
| 18 | 18 | 23 | Jimmy Spencer | Travis Carter Enterprises | Ford | 90 | 0 | running | 109 | $14,380 |
| 19 | 40 | 31 | Ward Burton | A.G. Dillard Motorsports | Chevrolet | 89 | 0 | running | 106 | $14,125 |
| 20 | 23 | 9 | Lake Speed | Melling Racing | Ford | 89 | 0 | running | 103 | $15,770 |
| 21 | 32 | 4 | Sterling Marlin | Morgan–McClure Motorsports | Chevrolet | 89 | 0 | running | 100 | $23,105 |
| 22 | 38 | 29 | Steve Grissom | Diamond Ridge Motorsports | Chevrolet | 89 | 0 | running | 97 | $13,485 |
| 23 | 15 | 3 | Dale Earnhardt | Richard Childress Racing | Chevrolet | 89 | 0 | running | 94 | $30,890 |
| 24 | 29 | 71 | Dave Marcis | Marcis Auto Racing | Chevrolet | 89 | 0 | running | 91 | $13,270 |
| 25 | 9 | 98 | Jeremy Mayfield | Cale Yarborough Motorsports | Ford | 88 | 0 | running | 88 | $13,295 |
| 26 | 4 | 2 | Rusty Wallace | Penske Racing South | Ford | 88 | 1 | running | 90 | $25,935 |
| 27 | 24 | 77 | Bobby Hillin Jr. | Jasper Motorsports | Ford | 88 | 0 | running | 82 | $9,625 |
| 28 | 39 | 15 | Dick Trickle | Bud Moore Engineering | Ford | 88 | 0 | running | 79 | $17,765 |
| 29 | 34 | 27 | Elton Sawyer | Junior Johnson & Associates | Ford | 87 | 0 | running | 76 | $17,505 |
| 30 | 10 | 21 | Morgan Shepherd | Wood Brothers Racing | Ford | 85 | 0 | running | 73 | $17,545 |
| 31 | 19 | 87 | Joe Nemechek | NEMCO Motorsports | Chevrolet | 82 | 0 | transmission | 70 | $9,280 |
| 32 | 35 | 75 | Todd Bodine | Butch Mock Motorsports | Ford | 74 | 0 | transmission | 67 | $14,215 |
| 33 | 37 | 43 | Bobby Hamilton | Petty Enterprises | Pontiac | 60 | 0 | running | 64 | $12,155 |
| 34 | 22 | 33 | Robert Pressley (R) | Leo Jackson Motorsports | Chevrolet | 57 | 1 | transmission | 66 | $17,095 |
| 35 | 36 | 68 | Ron Fellows | Canaska Racing | Chevrolet | 40 | 0 | cylinder | 58 | $9,035 |
| 36 | 16 | 25 | Ken Schrader | Hendrick Motorsports | Chevrolet | 34 | 0 | engine | 55 | $13,940 |
| 37 | 33 | 1 | Rick Mast | Precision Products Racing | Ford | 32 | 0 | oil leak | 52 | $13,940 |
| 38 | 25 | 8 | Jeff Burton | Stavola Brothers Racing | Ford | 30 | 0 | transmission | 49 | $13,940 |
| 39 | 8 | 42 | Kyle Petty | Team SABCO | Pontiac | 21 | 0 | transmission | 46 | $13,940 |
| 40 | 20 | 26 | Hut Stricklin | King Racing | Ford | 20 | 0 | valve | 43 | $13,940 |
Official race results

| Previous race: 1995 Brickyard 400 | NASCAR Winston Cup Series; 1995 season | Next race: 1995 GM Goodwrench Dealer 400 |
