= 1995 Goody's 500 (Bristol) =

22nd race of the 1995 NASCAR Winston Cup Series

Race details
- Race 22 of 31 in the 1995 NASCAR Winston Cup Series
- The 1995 Goody's 500 program cover, featuring Jeff Gordon.
- Date: August 26, 1995
- Official name: 35th Annual Goody's 500
- Location: Bristol, Tennessee, Bristol Motor Speedway
- Course: Permanent racing facility
- Course length: 0.533 miles (0.858 km)
- Distance: 500 laps, 266.5 mi (428.89 km)
- Scheduled distance: 500 laps, 266.5 mi (428.89 km)
- Average speed: 81.979 miles per hour (131.932 km/h)

Pole position
Driver	Mark Martin	Roush Racing
- Time: 15.339

Most laps led
Driver	Dale Jarrett	Robert Yates Racing
- Laps: 99

Winner
No. 5	Terry Labonte	Hendrick Motorsports

Television in the United States
- Network: ESPN
- Announcers: Bob Jenkins, Ned Jarrett, Benny Parsons

Radio in the United States
- Radio: Performance Racing Network

The 1995 Goody's 500 was the 22nd stock car race of the 1995 NASCAR Winston Cup Series and the 35th iteration of the event. The race was held on Saturday, August 26, 1995, in Bristol, Tennessee at Bristol Motor Speedway, a 0.533 miles (0.858 km) permanent oval-shaped racetrack. The race took the scheduled 500 laps to complete. On the final lap of the race, Hendrick Motorsports driver Terry Labonte and Richard Childress Racing driver Dale Earnhardt were battling for the lead. On the final turn of the race, Earnhardt would bump Labonte, sending him into a slide. Labonte would try to get the car straightened up, but would turn the other direction straight into the wall, crossing the finish line while hitting the wall. Earnhardt was not able to pass Labonte while Labonte was wrecking his car. The win therefore went to Labonte; although he had a wrecked car as he crossed the finish line first. The win was Labonte's 17th career NASCAR Winston Cup Series victory and his third and final victory of the season. To fill out the top three, the aforementioned Dale Earnhardt and Robert Yates Racing driver Dale Jarrett would finish second and third, respectively.

== Background ==
The layout of Bristol Motor Speedway, the venue where the race was held.

The Bristol Motor Speedway, formerly known as Bristol International Raceway and Bristol Raceway, is a NASCAR short track venue located in Bristol, Tennessee. Constructed in 1960, it held its first NASCAR race on July 30, 1961. Despite its short length, Bristol is among the most popular tracks on the NASCAR schedule because of its distinct features, which include extraordinarily steep banking, an all concrete surface, two pit roads, and stadium-like seating. It has also been named one of the loudest NASCAR tracks.

=== Entry list ===
- (R) denotes rookie driver.

#	Driver	Team	Make
1	Rick Mast	Precision Products Racing	Pontiac
2	Rusty Wallace	Penske Racing South	Ford
3	Dale Earnhardt	Richard Childress Racing	Chevrolet
4	Sterling Marlin	Morgan–McClure Motorsports	Chevrolet
5	Terry Labonte	Hendrick Motorsports	Chevrolet
6	Mark Martin	Roush Racing	Ford
7	Geoff Bodine	Geoff Bodine Racing	Ford
8	Jeff Burton	Stavola Brothers Racing	Ford
9	Lake Speed	Melling Racing	Ford
10	Ricky Rudd	Rudd Performance Motorsports	Ford
11	Brett Bodine	Junior Johnson & Associates	Ford
12	Derrike Cope	Bobby Allison Motorsports	Ford
15	Dick Trickle	Bud Moore Engineering	Ford
16	Ted Musgrave	Roush Racing	Ford
17	Darrell Waltrip	Darrell Waltrip Motorsports	Chevrolet
18	Bobby Labonte	Joe Gibbs Racing	Chevrolet
21	Morgan Shepherd	Wood Brothers Racing	Ford
22	Ward Burton	Bill Davis Racing	Pontiac
23	Jimmy Spencer	Haas-Carter Motorsports	Ford
24	Jeff Gordon	Hendrick Motorsports	Chevrolet
25	Ken Schrader	Hendrick Motorsports	Chevrolet
26	Hut Stricklin	King Racing	Ford
27	Elton Sawyer	Junior Johnson & Associates	Ford
28	Dale Jarrett	Robert Yates Racing	Ford
29	Steve Grissom	Diamond Ridge Motorsports	Chevrolet
30	Michael Waltrip	Bahari Racing	Pontiac
31	Greg Sacks	A.G. Dillard Motorsports	Chevrolet
32	Jimmy Hensley	Active Motorsports	Chevrolet
33	Robert Pressley (R)	Leo Jackson Motorsports	Chevrolet
37	John Andretti	Kranefuss-Haas Racing	Ford
40	Rich Bickle	Dick Brooks Racing	Pontiac
41	Ricky Craven (R)	Larry Hedrick Motorsports	Chevrolet
42	Kyle Petty	Team SABCO	Pontiac
43	Bobby Hamilton	Petty Enterprises	Pontiac
71	Dave Marcis	Marcis Auto Racing	Chevrolet
75	Todd Bodine	Butch Mock Motorsports	Ford
77	Bobby Hillin Jr.	Jasper Motorsports	Ford
81	Kenny Wallace	FILMAR Racing	Ford
87	Joe Nemechek	NEMCO Motorsports	Chevrolet
90	Mike Wallace	Donlavey Racing	Ford
94	Bill Elliott	Elliott-Hardy Racing	Ford
95	Joe Ruttman	Sadler Brothers Racing	Ford
98	Jeremy Mayfield	Cale Yarborough Motorsports	Ford

== Qualifying ==
Qualifying was split into two rounds. The first round was held on Friday, August 25, at 5:30 PM EST. Each driver would have one lap to set a time. During the first round, the top 25 drivers in the round would be guaranteed a starting spot in the race. If a driver was not able to guarantee a spot in the first round, they had the option to scrub their time from the first round and try and run a faster lap time in a second round qualifying run, held on Saturday, August 26, at 1:00 PM EST. As with the first round, each driver would have one lap to set a time. For this specific race, positions 26-34 would be decided on time, and depending on who needed it, a select amount of positions were given to cars who had not otherwise qualified but were high enough in owner's points.

Mark Martin, driving for Roush Racing, would win the pole, setting a time of 15.339 and an average speed of 125.093 miles per hour (201.318 km/h) in the first round.

Seven drivers would fail to qualify.

=== Full qualifying results ===
Pos.	#	Driver	Team	Make	Time	Speed
1	6	Mark Martin	Roush Racing	Ford	15.339	125.093
2	5	Terry Labonte	Hendrick Motorsports	Chevrolet	15.392	124.662
3	30	Michael Waltrip	Bahari Racing	Pontiac	15.438	124.291
4	24	Jeff Gordon	Hendrick Motorsports	Chevrolet	15.472	124.018
5	2	Rusty Wallace	Penske Racing South	Ford	15.476	123.986
6	41	Ricky Craven	Larry Hedrick Motorsports	Chevrolet	15.478	123.970
7	3	Dale Earnhardt	Richard Childress Racing	Chevrolet	15.496	123.826
8	10	Ricky Rudd	Rudd Performance Motorsports	Ford	15.513	123.690
9	16	Ted Musgrave	Roush Racing	Ford	15.517	123.658
10	12	Derrike Cope	Bobby Allison Motorsports	Ford	15.524	123.602
11	26	Hut Stricklin	King Racing	Ford	15.527	123.578
12	87	Joe Nemechek	NEMCO Motorsports	Chevrolet	15.530	123.554
13	7	Geoff Bodine	Geoff Bodine Racing	Ford	15.532	123.539
14	33	Robert Pressley (R)	Leo Jackson Motorsports	Chevrolet	15.537	123.499
15	40	Rich Bickle (R)	Dick Brooks Racing	Pontiac	15.542	123.459
16	28	Dale Jarrett	Robert Yates Racing	Ford	15.578	123.174
17	22	Ward Burton	Bill Davis Racing	Pontiac	15.588	123.095
18	8	Jeff Burton	Stavola Brothers Racing	Ford	15.593	123.055
19	4	Sterling Marlin	Morgan–McClure Motorsports	Chevrolet	15.594	123.047
20	17	Darrell Waltrip	Darrell Waltrip Motorsports	Chevrolet	15.594	123.047
Failed to lock in Round 1
21	31	Greg Sacks	A.G. Dillard Motorsports	Chevrolet	15.536	123.507
22	94	Bill Elliott	Elliott-Hardy Racing	Ford	15.595	123.039
23	29	Steve Grissom	Diamond Ridge Motorsports	Chevrolet	15.596	123.032
24	1	Rick Mast	Precision Products Racing	Ford	15.608	122.937
25	25	Ken Schrader	Hendrick Motorsports	Chevrolet	15.621	122.835
26	23	Jimmy Spencer	Travis Carter Enterprises	Ford	15.621	122.835
27	90	Mike Wallace	Donlavey Racing	Ford	15.627	122.787
28	18	Bobby Labonte	Joe Gibbs Racing	Chevrolet	15.630	122.764
29	21	Morgan Shepherd	Wood Brothers Racing	Ford	15.639	122.693
30	98	Jeremy Mayfield	Cale Yarborough Motorsports	Ford	15.651	122.599
31	43	Bobby Hamilton	Petty Enterprises	Pontiac	15.659	122.537
32	71	Dave Marcis	Marcis Auto Racing	Chevrolet	15.660	122.529
Provisionals
33	11	Brett Bodine	Junior Johnson & Associates	Ford	-*	-*
34	37	John Andretti	Kranefuss-Haas Racing	Ford	-*	-*
35	15	Dick Trickle	Bud Moore Engineering	Ford	-*	-*
36	9	Lake Speed	Melling Racing	Ford	-*	-*
Failed to qualify
37	42	Kyle Petty	Team SABCO	Pontiac	-*	-*
38	95	Joe Ruttman	Sadler Brothers Racing	Ford	-*	-*
39	81	Kenny Wallace	FILMAR Racing	Ford	-*	-*
40	32	Jimmy Hensley	Active Motorsports	Chevrolet	-*	-*
41	77	Bobby Hillin Jr.	Jasper Motorsports	Ford	-*	-*
42	75	Todd Bodine	Butch Mock Motorsports	Ford	-*	-*
43	27	Elton Sawyer	Junior Johnson & Associates	Ford	-*	-*
Official first round qualifying results
Official starting lineup

== Race results ==
Fin	St	#	Driver	Team	Make	Laps	Led	Status	Pts	Winnings
1	2	5	Terry Labonte	Hendrick Motorsports	Chevrolet	500	69	running	180	$66,940
2	7	3	Dale Earnhardt	Richard Childress Racing	Chevrolet	500	81	running	175	$66,890
3	16	28	Dale Jarrett	Robert Yates Racing	Ford	500	99	running	175	$39,390
4	20	17	Darrell Waltrip	Darrell Waltrip Motorsports	Chevrolet	500	2	running	165	$32,780
5	1	6	Mark Martin	Roush Racing	Ford	500	57	running	160	$41,775
6	4	24	Jeff Gordon	Hendrick Motorsports	Chevrolet	500	86	running	155	$27,865
7	19	4	Sterling Marlin	Morgan–McClure Motorsports	Chevrolet	500	0	running	146	$26,140
8	27	90	Mike Wallace	Donlavey Racing	Ford	500	0	running	142	$14,840
9	18	8	Jeff Burton	Stavola Brothers Racing	Ford	500	0	running	138	$22,515
10	10	12	Derrike Cope	Bobby Allison Motorsports	Ford	499	33	running	139	$20,565
11	28	18	Bobby Labonte	Joe Gibbs Racing	Chevrolet	499	0	running	130	$25,015
12	13	7	Geoff Bodine	Geoff Bodine Racing	Ford	499	0	running	127	$26,415
13	9	16	Ted Musgrave	Roush Racing	Ford	497	0	running	124	$21,065
14	25	25	Ken Schrader	Hendrick Motorsports	Chevrolet	497	0	running	121	$20,815
15	3	30	Michael Waltrip	Bahari Racing	Pontiac	497	0	running	118	$21,960
16	12	87	Joe Nemechek	NEMCO Motorsports	Chevrolet	496	0	running	115	$15,260
17	29	21	Morgan Shepherd	Wood Brothers Racing	Ford	495	0	running	112	$20,110
18	26	23	Jimmy Spencer	Travis Carter Enterprises	Ford	494	0	running	109	$14,860
19	34	37	John Andretti	Kranefuss-Haas Racing	Ford	476	0	running	106	$14,750
20	31	43	Bobby Hamilton	Petty Enterprises	Pontiac	466	0	running	103	$16,360
21	5	2	Rusty Wallace	Penske Racing South	Ford	454	0	running	100	$26,110
22	23	29	Steve Grissom	Diamond Ridge Motorsports	Chevrolet	454	0	running	97	$14,360
23	22	94	Bill Elliott	Elliott-Hardy Racing	Ford	453	0	running	94	$14,210
24	14	33	Robert Pressley (R)	Leo Jackson Motorsports	Chevrolet	438	0	running	91	$20,035
25	21	31	Greg Sacks	A.G. Dillard Motorsports	Chevrolet	422	0	running	88	$14,590
26	24	1	Rick Mast	Precision Products Racing	Ford	412	0	crash	85	$18,760
27	32	71	Dave Marcis	Marcis Auto Racing	Chevrolet	404	0	crash	82	$13,637
28	33	11	Brett Bodine	Junior Johnson & Associates	Ford	404	0	running	79	$23,585
29	36	9	Lake Speed	Melling Racing	Ford	391	17	crash	81	$14,560
30	30	98	Jeremy Mayfield	Cale Yarborough Motorsports	Ford	382	55	running	78	$13,010
31	15	40	Rich Bickle (R)	Dick Brooks Racing	Pontiac	368	0	crash	70	$15,510
32	6	41	Ricky Craven	Larry Hedrick Motorsports	Chevrolet	306	1	crash	72	$11,010
33	11	26	Hut Stricklin	King Racing	Ford	253	0	crash	64	$15,510
34	17	22	Ward Burton	Bill Davis Racing	Pontiac	250	0	crash	61	$15,510
35	35	15	Dick Trickle	Bud Moore Engineering	Ford	233	0	crash	58	$15,510
36	8	10	Ricky Rudd	Rudd Performance Motorsports	Ford	138	0	crash	55	$23,510
Official race results

Previous race: 1995 GM Goodwrench Dealer 400	NASCAR Winston Cup Series; 1995 season	Next race: 1995 Mountain Dew Southern 500
