= 1999 Cracker Barrel 500 =

Fourth race of the 1999 NASCAR Winston Cup Series

Race details
- Race 4 of 34 in the 1999 NASCAR Winston Cup Series
- The 1999 Cracker Barrel 500 program cover.
- Date: March 14, 1999
- Official name: 40th Annual Cracker Barrel Old Country Store 500
- Location: Hampton, Georgia, Atlanta Motor Speedway
- Course: Permanent racing facility
- Course length: 1.54 miles (2.48 km)
- Distance: 325 laps, 500.5 mi (805.476 km)
- Average speed: 143.284 miles per hour (230.593 km/h)

Pole position
Driver	Bobby Labonte	Joe Gibbs Racing
- Time: 28.437

Most laps led
Driver	Jeff Gordon	Hendrick Motorsports
- Laps: 109

Winner
No. 24	Jeff Gordon	Hendrick Motorsports

Television in the United States
- Network: ABC
- Announcers: Bob Jenkins, Benny Parsons

Radio in the United States
- Radio: Performance Racing Network

The 1999 Cracker Barrel 500 was the fourth stock car race of the 1999 NASCAR Winston Cup Series season and the 40th iteration of the event. The race was held on Sunday, March 14, 1999, in Hampton, Georgia at Atlanta Motor Speedway, a 1.54 miles (2.48 km) permanent asphalt quad-oval intermediate speedway. The race took the scheduled 325 laps to complete. In the closing laps of the race, Hendrick Motorsports driver Jeff Gordon would manage to pull a sizable lead over the rest of the field to win his 44th career NASCAR Winston Cup Series victory and his second of the season. To fill out the podium, Joe Gibbs Racing driver Bobby Labonte and Roush Racing driver Mark Martin would finish second and third, respectively.

== Background ==
The layout of Atlanta Motor Speedway, the circuit where the race was held.

Atlanta Motor Speedway (formerly Atlanta International Raceway) is a 1.54-mile race track in Hampton, Georgia, United States, 20 miles (32 km) south of Atlanta. It has annually hosted NASCAR Winston Cup Series stock car races since its inauguration in 1960.

The venue was bought by Speedway Motorsports in 1990. In 1994, 46 condominiums were built over the northeastern side of the track. In 1997, to standardize the track with Speedway Motorsports' other two intermediate ovals, the entire track was almost completely rebuilt. The frontstretch and backstretch were swapped, and the configuration of the track was changed from oval to quad-oval, with a new official length of 1.54-mile (2.48 km) where before it was 1.522-mile (2.449 km). The project made the track one of the fastest on the NASCAR circuit.

=== Entry list ===
- (R) - denotes rookie driver

#	Driver	Team	Make
00	Buckshot Jones (R)	Buckshot Racing	Pontiac
1	Steve Park	Dale Earnhardt, Inc.	Chevrolet
2	Rusty Wallace	Penske-Kranefuss Racing	Ford
3	Dale Earnhardt	Richard Childress Racing	Chevrolet
4	Bobby Hamilton	Morgan–McClure Motorsports	Chevrolet
5	Terry Labonte	Hendrick Motorsports	Chevrolet
6	Mark Martin	Roush Racing	Ford
7	Michael Waltrip	Mattei Motorsports	Chevrolet
9	Jerry Nadeau	Melling Racing	Ford
10	Ricky Rudd	Rudd Performance Motorsports	Ford
11	Brett Bodine	Brett Bodine Racing	Ford
12	Jeremy Mayfield	Penske-Kranefuss Racing	Ford
16	Kevin Lepage	Roush Racing	Ford
18	Bobby Labonte	Joe Gibbs Racing	Pontiac
20	Tony Stewart (R)	Joe Gibbs Racing	Pontiac
21	Elliott Sadler (R)	Wood Brothers Racing	Ford
22	Ward Burton	Bill Davis Racing	Pontiac
23	Jimmy Spencer	Haas-Carter Motorsports	Ford
24	Jeff Gordon	Hendrick Motorsports	Chevrolet
25	Wally Dallenbach Jr.	Hendrick Motorsports	Chevrolet
26	Johnny Benson Jr.	Roush Racing	Ford
28	Kenny Irwin Jr.	Robert Yates Racing	Ford
30	Derrike Cope	Bahari Racing	Pontiac
31	Mike Skinner	Richard Childress Racing	Chevrolet
33	Ken Schrader	Andy Petree Racing	Chevrolet
36	Ernie Irvan	MB2 Motorsports	Pontiac
40	Sterling Marlin	Team SABCO	Chevrolet
41	David Green	Larry Hedrick Motorsports	Chevrolet
42	Joe Nemechek	Team SABCO	Chevrolet
43	John Andretti	Petty Enterprises	Pontiac
44	Kyle Petty	Petty Enterprises	Pontiac
45	Rich Bickle	Tyler Jet Motorsports	Pontiac
55	Kenny Wallace	Andy Petree Racing	Chevrolet
58	Ricky Craven	SBIII Motorsports	Ford
60	Geoff Bodine	Joe Bessey Racing	Chevrolet
66	Darrell Waltrip	Haas-Carter Motorsports	Ford
71	Dave Marcis	Marcis Auto Racing	Chevrolet
75	Ted Musgrave	Butch Mock Motorsports	Ford
77	Robert Pressley	Jasper Motorsports	Ford
88	Dale Jarrett	Robert Yates Racing	Ford
90	Morgan Shepherd	Donlavey Racing	Ford
91	Steve Grissom	LJ Racing	Chevrolet
94	Bill Elliott	Bill Elliott Racing	Ford
97	Chad Little	Roush Racing	Ford
98	Rick Mast	Burdette Motorsports	Ford
99	Jeff Burton	Roush Racing	Ford
Official entry list

== Practice ==
=== First practice ===
The first practice session was held on Friday, March 12, at 10:00 AM EST. The session would last for two hours and 25 minutes. Jeremy Mayfield, driving for Penske-Kranefuss Racing, would set the fastest time in the session, with a lap of 28.603 and an average speed of 193.825 mph (311.931 km/h).

Pos.	#	Driver	Team	Make	Time	Speed
1	12	Jeremy Mayfield	Penske-Kranefuss Racing	Ford	28.603	193.825
2	31	Mike Skinner	Richard Childress Racing	Chevrolet	28.663	193.420
3	60	Geoff Bodine	Joe Bessey Racing	Chevrolet	28.691	193.231
Full first practice results

=== Second practice ===
The second practice session was held on Friday, March 12, at 12:00 PM EST. The session would last for 55 minutes. Joe Nemechek, driving for Team SABCO, would set the fastest time in the session, with a lap of 28.474 and an average speed of 194.703 mph (313.344 km/h).

Pos.	#	Driver	Team	Make	Time	Speed
1	42	Joe Nemechek	Team SABCO	Chevrolet	28.474	194.703
2	18	Bobby Labonte	Joe Gibbs Racing	Pontiac	28.504	194.499
3	60	Geoff Bodine	Joe Bessey Racing	Chevrolet	28.534	194.294
Full second practice results

=== Third practice ===
The third practice session was held on Saturday, March 13, at 9:30 AM EST. The session would last for 45 minutes. Derrike Cope, driving for Bahari Racing, would set the fastest time in the session, with a lap of 29.118 and an average speed of 190.397 mph (306.414 km/h).

Pos.	#	Driver	Team	Make	Time	Speed
1	30	Derrike Cope	Bahari Racing	Pontiac	29.118	190.397
2	45	Rich Bickle	Tyler Jet Motorsports	Pontiac	29.222	189.720
3	55	Kenny Wallace	Andy Petree Racing	Chevrolet	29.289	189.286
Full third practice results

=== Final practice ===
The final practice session, sometimes referred to as Happy Hour, was held on Saturday, March 13, after the preliminary 1999 Yellow Freight 300. The session would last for one hour. Jeff Gordon, driving for Hendrick Motorsports, would set the fastest time in the session, with a lap of 29.359 and an average speed of 188.834 mph (303.899 km/h).

Pos.	#	Driver	Team	Make	Time	Speed
1	24	Jeff Gordon	Hendrick Motorsports	Chevrolet	29.359	188.834
2	31	Mike Skinner	Richard Childress Racing	Chevrolet	29.432	188.366
3	20	Tony Stewart (R)	Joe Gibbs Racing	Pontiac	29.462	188.174
Full Happy Hour practice results

== Qualifying ==
Qualifying was split into two rounds. The first round was held on Friday, March 12, at 2:30 PM EST. Each driver would have one lap to set a time. During the first round, the top 25 drivers in the round would be guaranteed a starting spot in the race. If a driver was not able to guarantee a spot in the first round, they had the option to scrub their time from the first round and try and run a faster lap time in a second round qualifying run, held on Saturday, March 13, at 11:00 AM EST. As with the first round, each driver would have one lap to set a time. Positions 26-36 would be decided on time, while positions 37-43 would be based on provisionals. Six spots are awarded by the use of provisionals based on owner's points. The seventh is awarded to a past champion who has not otherwise qualified for the race. If no past champion needs the provisional, the next team in the owner points will be awarded a provisional.

Bobby Labonte, driving for Joe Gibbs Racing, would win the pole, setting a time of 28.437 and an average speed of 194.957 miles per hour (313.753 km/h).

Three drivers would fail to qualify: Robert Pressley, Steve Grissom, and Morgan Shepherd.

=== Full qualifying results ===
Pos.	#	Driver	Team	Make	Time	Speed
1	18	Bobby Labonte	Joe Gibbs Racing	Pontiac	28.437	194.957
2	31	Mike Skinner	Richard Childress Racing	Chevrolet	28.544	194.226
3	20	Tony Stewart (R)	Joe Gibbs Racing	Pontiac	28.549	194.192
4	88	Dale Jarrett	Robert Yates Racing	Ford	28.630	193.643
5	12	Jeremy Mayfield	Penske-Kranefuss Racing	Ford	28.690	193.238
6	60	Geoff Bodine	Joe Bessey Racing	Chevrolet	28.699	193.177
7	00	Buckshot Jones (R)	Buckshot Racing	Pontiac	28.777	192.654
8	24	Jeff Gordon	Hendrick Motorsports	Chevrolet	28.786	192.594
9	42	Joe Nemechek	Team SABCO	Chevrolet	28.817	192.386
10	43	John Andretti	Petty Enterprises	Pontiac	28.829	192.306
11	75	Ted Musgrave	Butch Mock Motorsports	Ford	28.847	192.186
12	9	Jerry Nadeau	Melling Racing	Ford	28.854	192.140
13	6	Mark Martin	Roush Racing	Ford	28.856	192.126
14	25	Wally Dallenbach Jr.	Hendrick Motorsports	Chevrolet	28.864	192.073
15	21	Elliott Sadler (R)	Wood Brothers Racing	Ford	28.865	192.067
16	97	Chad Little	Roush Racing	Ford	28.868	192.047
17	28	Kenny Irwin Jr.	Robert Yates Racing	Ford	28.870	192.033
18	40	Sterling Marlin	Team SABCO	Chevrolet	28.877	191.987
19	98	Rick Mast	Burdette Motorsports	Ford	28.885	191.934
20	22	Ward Burton	Bill Davis Racing	Pontiac	28.906	191.794
21	36	Ernie Irvan	MB2 Motorsports	Pontiac	28.913	191.748
22	44	Kyle Petty	Petty Enterprises	Pontiac	28.923	191.681
23	2	Rusty Wallace	Penske-Kranefuss Racing	Ford	28.928	191.648
24	7	Michael Waltrip	Mattei Motorsports	Chevrolet	28.957	191.456
25	5	Terry Labonte	Hendrick Motorsports	Chevrolet	28.983	191.285
26	41	David Green	Larry Hedrick Motorsports	Chevrolet	28.903	191.814
27	30	Derrike Cope	Bahari Racing	Pontiac	28.934	191.608
28	4	Bobby Hamilton	Morgan–McClure Motorsports	Chevrolet	28.996	191.199
29	58	Ricky Craven	SBIII Motorsports	Ford	29.014	191.080
30	45	Rich Bickle	Tyler Jet Motorsports	Pontiac	29.018	191.054
31	94	Bill Elliott	Bill Elliott Racing	Ford	29.019	191.047
32	1	Steve Park	Dale Earnhardt, Inc.	Chevrolet	29.030	190.975
33	3	Dale Earnhardt	Richard Childress Racing	Chevrolet	29.055	190.811
34	55	Kenny Wallace	Andy Petree Racing	Chevrolet	29.078	190.660
35	71	Dave Marcis	Marcis Auto Racing	Chevrolet	29.089	190.588
36	26	Johnny Benson Jr.	Roush Racing	Ford	29.092	190.568
Provisionals
37	99	Jeff Burton	Roush Racing	Ford	-*	-*
38	33	Ken Schrader	Andy Petree Racing	Chevrolet	-*	-*
39	23	Jimmy Spencer	Haas-Carter Motorsports	Ford	-*	-*
40	16	Kevin Lepage	Roush Racing	Ford	-*	-*
41	10	Ricky Rudd	Rudd Performance Motorsports	Ford	-*	-*
42	11	Brett Bodine	Brett Bodine Racing	Ford	-*	-*
Champion's Provisional
43	66	Darrell Waltrip	Haas-Carter Motorsports	Ford	-*	-*
Failed to qualify
44	77	Robert Pressley	Jasper Motorsports	Ford	29.136	190.280
45	91	Steve Grissom	LJ Racing	Chevrolet	29.242	189.590
46	90	Morgan Shepherd	Donlavey Racing	Ford	-	-
Official qualifying results

*Time not available.

== Race results ==
Fin	St	#	Driver	Team	Make	Laps	Led	Status	Pts	Winnings
1	8	24	Jeff Gordon	Hendrick Motorsports	Chevrolet	325	109	running	185	$117,650
2	1	18	Bobby Labonte	Joe Gibbs Racing	Pontiac	325	103	running	175	$98,850
3	13	6	Mark Martin	Roush Racing	Ford	325	0	running	165	$62,775
4	37	99	Jeff Burton	Roush Racing	Ford	325	1	running	165	$64,900
5	4	88	Dale Jarrett	Robert Yates Racing	Ford	325	0	running	155	$53,675
6	2	31	Mike Skinner	Richard Childress Racing	Chevrolet	325	79	running	155	$64,145
7	21	36	Ernie Irvan	MB2 Motorsports	Pontiac	325	0	running	146	$40,220
8	20	22	Ward Burton	Bill Davis Racing	Pontiac	325	0	running	142	$42,995
9	16	97	Chad Little	Roush Racing	Ford	325	1	running	143	$38,545
10	24	7	Michael Waltrip	Mattei Motorsports	Chevrolet	325	0	running	134	$48,685
11	3	20	Tony Stewart (R)	Joe Gibbs Racing	Pontiac	325	3	running	135	$35,815
12	28	4	Bobby Hamilton	Morgan–McClure Motorsports	Chevrolet	325	0	running	127	$41,295
13	25	5	Terry Labonte	Hendrick Motorsports	Chevrolet	324	0	running	124	$40,075
14	9	42	Joe Nemechek	Team SABCO	Chevrolet	324	4	running	126	$37,755
15	31	94	Bill Elliott	Bill Elliott Racing	Ford	324	0	running	118	$38,165
16	19	98	Rick Mast	Burdette Motorsports	Ford	324	0	running	115	$29,370
17	39	23	Jimmy Spencer	Haas-Carter Motorsports	Ford	324	12	running	117	$35,560
18	18	40	Sterling Marlin	Team SABCO	Chevrolet	324	9	running	114	$35,040
19	40	16	Kevin Lepage	Roush Racing	Ford	324	0	running	106	$35,330
20	43	66	Darrell Waltrip	Haas-Carter Motorsports	Ford	323	0	running	103	$25,925
21	26	41	David Green	Larry Hedrick Motorsports	Chevrolet	323	0	running	100	$30,900
22	36	26	Johnny Benson Jr.	Roush Racing	Ford	323	0	running	97	$34,735
23	17	28	Kenny Irwin Jr.	Robert Yates Racing	Ford	322	0	running	94	$34,425
24	11	75	Ted Musgrave	Butch Mock Motorsports	Ford	322	0	running	91	$26,890
25	41	10	Ricky Rudd	Rudd Performance Motorsports	Ford	322	0	running	88	$33,985
26	38	33	Ken Schrader	Andy Petree Racing	Chevrolet	322	0	running	85	$33,630
27	12	9	Jerry Nadeau	Melling Racing	Ford	321	0	running	82	$26,920
28	10	43	John Andretti	Petty Enterprises	Pontiac	319	0	running	79	$30,445
29	34	55	Kenny Wallace	Andy Petree Racing	Chevrolet	319	0	running	76	$23,905
30	30	45	Rich Bickle	Tyler Jet Motorsports	Pontiac	318	0	running	73	$23,370
31	15	21	Elliott Sadler (R)	Wood Brothers Racing	Ford	318	0	running	70	$30,085
32	32	1	Steve Park	Dale Earnhardt, Inc.	Chevrolet	317	0	running	67	$30,025
33	42	11	Brett Bodine	Brett Bodine Racing	Ford	316	0	out of gas	64	$29,965
34	35	71	Dave Marcis	Marcis Auto Racing	Chevrolet	315	4	running	66	$23,735
35	23	2	Rusty Wallace	Penske-Kranefuss Racing	Ford	311	0	running	58	$38,915
36	5	12	Jeremy Mayfield	Penske-Kranefuss Racing	Ford	251	0	handling	55	$37,895
37	7	00	Buckshot Jones (R)	Buckshot Racing	Pontiac	248	0	fatigue	52	$22,880
38	6	60	Geoff Bodine	Joe Bessey Racing	Chevrolet	233	0	crash	49	$22,860
39	14	25	Wally Dallenbach Jr.	Hendrick Motorsports	Chevrolet	191	0	engine	46	$29,845
40	33	3	Dale Earnhardt	Richard Childress Racing	Chevrolet	151	0	handling	43	$41,625
41	27	30	Derrike Cope	Bahari Racing	Pontiac	150	0	crash	40	$22,805
42	29	58	Ricky Craven	SBIII Motorsports	Ford	65	0	engine	37	$22,785
43	22	44	Kyle Petty	Petty Enterprises	Pontiac	45	0	engine	34	$22,765
Failed to qualify
44		77	Robert Pressley	Jasper Motorsports	Ford					
45		91	Steve Grissom	LJ Racing	Chevrolet					
46		90	Morgan Shepherd	Donlavey Racing	Ford					
Official race results

Previous race: 1999 Las Vegas 400	NASCAR Winston Cup Series; 1999 season	Next race: 1999 TranSouth Financial 400
