= 1999 Dura Lube/Big K 400 =

Second race of the 1999 NASCAR Winston Cup Series

Race details
- Race 2 of 34 in the 1999 NASCAR Winston Cup Series
- The 1999 Dura Lube/Big K 400 program cover.
- Date: February 21, 1999
- Official name: 34th Annual Dura Lube/Big K 400
- Location: Rockingham, North Carolina, North Carolina Speedway
- Course: Permanent racing facility
- Course length: 1.017 miles (1.637 km)
- Distance: 393 laps, 399.681 mi (643.224 km)
- Average speed: 120.75 miles per hour (194.33 km/h)
- Attendance: 48,000

Pole position
| Driver | Ricky Rudd | Rudd Performance Motorsports |
- Time: 23.284

Most laps led
| Driver | Jeff Burton | Roush Racing |
- Laps: 228

Winner
| No. 6 | Mark Martin | Roush Racing |

Television in the United States
- Network: TNN
- Announcers: Eli Gold, Buddy Baker, Dick Berggren

Radio in the United States
- Radio: Motor Racing Network

The 1999 Dura Lube/Big K 400 was the second stock car race of the 1999 NASCAR Winston Cup Series season and the 34th iteration of the event. The race was held on Sunday, February 21, 1999, in Rockingham, North Carolina, at North Carolina Speedway, a 1.017 miles (1.637 km) permanent high-banked racetrack. The race took the scheduled 393 laps to complete. In the closing laps of the race, Roush Racing driver Mark Martin would manage to pull away with nine to go to win his 30th career NASCAR Winston Cup Series victory and his first victory of the season. To fill out the podium, Robert Yates Racing driver Dale Jarrett and Joe Gibbs Racing driver Bobby Labonte would finish second and third, respectively.

== Background ==
The layout of North Carolina Speedway, the venue where the race was held.

North Carolina Speedway was opened as a flat, one-mile oval on October 31, 1965. In 1969, the track was extensively reconfigured to a high-banked, D-shaped oval just over one mile in length. In 1997, North Carolina Motor Speedway merged with Penske Motorsports, and was renamed North Carolina Speedway. Shortly thereafter, the infield was reconfigured, and competition on the infield road course, mostly by the SCCA, was discontinued. Currently, the track is home to the Fast Track High Performance Driving School.

=== Entry list ===
- (R) denotes rookie driver.

| # | Driver | Team | Make |
|---|---|---|---|
| 00 | Buckshot Jones (R) | Buckshot Racing | Pontiac |
| 1 | Steve Park | Dale Earnhardt, Inc. | Chevrolet |
| 2 | Rusty Wallace | Penske-Kranefuss Racing | Ford |
| 3 | Dale Earnhardt | Richard Childress Racing | Chevrolet |
| 4 | Bobby Hamilton | Morgan–McClure Motorsports | Chevrolet |
| 5 | Terry Labonte | Hendrick Motorsports | Chevrolet |
| 6 | Mark Martin | Roush Racing | Ford |
| 7 | Michael Waltrip | Mattei Motorsports | Chevrolet |
| 9 | Jerry Nadeau | Melling Racing | Ford |
| 10 | Ricky Rudd | Rudd Performance Motorsports | Ford |
| 11 | Brett Bodine | Brett Bodine Racing | Ford |
| 12 | Jeremy Mayfield | Penske-Kranefuss Racing | Ford |
| 16 | Kevin Lepage | Roush Racing | Ford |
| 18 | Bobby Labonte | Joe Gibbs Racing | Pontiac |
| 20 | Tony Stewart (R) | Joe Gibbs Racing | Pontiac |
| 21 | Elliott Sadler (R) | Wood Brothers Racing | Ford |
| 22 | Ward Burton | Bill Davis Racing | Pontiac |
| 23 | Jimmy Spencer | Haas-Carter Motorsports | Ford |
| 24 | Jeff Gordon | Hendrick Motorsports | Chevrolet |
| 25 | Wally Dallenbach Jr. | Hendrick Motorsports | Chevrolet |
| 26 | Johnny Benson Jr. | Roush Racing | Ford |
| 28 | Kenny Irwin Jr. | Robert Yates Racing | Ford |
| 30 | Derrike Cope | Bahari Racing | Pontiac |
| 31 | Mike Skinner | Richard Childress Racing | Chevrolet |
| 33 | Ken Schrader | Andy Petree Racing | Chevrolet |
| 36 | Ernie Irvan | MB2 Motorsports | Pontiac |
| 40 | Sterling Marlin | Team SABCO | Chevrolet |
| 41 | David Green | Larry Hedrick Motorsports | Chevrolet |
| 42 | Joe Nemechek | Team SABCO | Chevrolet |
| 43 | John Andretti | Petty Enterprises | Pontiac |
| 44 | Kyle Petty | Petty Enterprises | Pontiac |
| 45 | Rich Bickle | Tyler Jet Motorsports | Pontiac |
| 50 | Billy Standridge | Midwest Transit Racing | Chevrolet |
| 55 | Kenny Wallace | Andy Petree Racing | Chevrolet |
| 58 | Ricky Craven | SBIII Motorsports | Ford |
| 60 | Geoff Bodine | Joe Bessey Racing | Chevrolet |
| 66 | Darrell Waltrip | Haas-Carter Motorsports | Ford |
| 71 | Dave Marcis | Marcis Auto Racing | Chevrolet |
| 75 | Ted Musgrave | Butch Mock Motorsports | Ford |
| 77 | Robert Pressley | Jasper Motorsports | Ford |
| 88 | Dale Jarrett | Robert Yates Racing | Ford |
| 90 | Morgan Shepherd | Donlavey Racing | Ford |
| 91 | Steve Grissom | LJ Racing | Chevrolet |
| 94 | Bill Elliott | Bill Elliott Racing | Ford |
| 97 | Chad Little | Roush Racing | Ford |
| 98 | Rick Mast | Cale Yarborough Motorsports | Ford |
| 99 | Jeff Burton | Roush Racing | Ford |
Official entry list

== Practice ==
=== First practice ===
The first practice session was held on Friday, February 19, at 10:00 a.m. EST. The session would last for one hour and 15 minutes. Jeremy Mayfield, driving for Penske-Kranefuss Racing, would set the fastest time in the session, with a lap of 23.409 and an average speed of 156.401 mph (251.703 km/h).

| Pos. | # | Driver | Team | Make | Time | Speed |
|---|---|---|---|---|---|---|
| 1 | 12 | Jeremy Mayfield | Penske-Kranefuss Racing | Ford | 23.409 | 156.401 |
| 2 | 22 | Ward Burton | Bill Davis Racing | Pontiac | 23.458 | 156.074 |
| 3 | 99 | Jeff Burton | Roush Racing | Ford | 23.544 | 155.504 |
Full first practice results

=== Second practice ===
The second practice session was held on Friday, February 19, at 12:00 p.m. EST. The session would last for 45 minutes. Jeremy Mayfield, driving for Penske-Kranefuss Racing, would set the fastest time in the session, with a lap of 23.325 and an average speed of 156.964 mph (252.609 km/h).

| Pos. | # | Driver | Team | Make | Time | Speed |
|---|---|---|---|---|---|---|
| 1 | 12 | Jeremy Mayfield | Penske-Kranefuss Racing | Ford | 23.325 | 156.964 |
| 2 | 31 | Mike Skinner | Richard Childress Racing | Chevrolet | 23.339 | 156.870 |
| 3 | 24 | Jeff Gordon | Hendrick Motorsports | Chevrolet | 23.358 | 156.742 |
Full second practice results

=== Third practice ===
The third practice session was held on Saturday, February 20, at 9:00 a.m. EST. The session would last for 45 minutes. Mark Martin, driving for Roush Racing, would set the fastest time in the session, with a lap of 23.185 and an average speed of 157.912 mph (254.135 km/h).

| Pos. | # | Driver | Team | Make | Time | Speed |
|---|---|---|---|---|---|---|
| 1 | 6 | Mark Martin | Roush Racing | Ford | 23.185 | 157.912 |
| 2 | 88 | Dale Jarrett | Robert Yates Racing | Ford | 23.316 | 157.025 |
| 3 | 10 | Ricky Rudd | Rudd Performance Motorsports | Ford | 23.318 | 157.011 |
Full third practice results

=== Final practice ===
The third and final practice session, sometimes referred to as Happy Hour, was held on Saturday, February 20, after the preliminary 1999 Alltel 200. The session would last for an hour. Jeff Gordon, driving for Hendrick Motorsports, would set the fastest time in the session, with a lap of 24.251 and an average speed of 150.971 mph (242.964 km/h).

| Pos. | # | Driver | Team | Make | Time | Speed |
|---|---|---|---|---|---|---|
| 1 | 24 | Jeff Gordon | Hendrick Motorsports | Chevrolet | 24.251 | 150.971 |
| 2 | 3 | Dale Earnhardt | Richard Childress Racing | Chevrolet | 24.333 | 150.462 |
| 3 | 4 | Bobby Hamilton | Morgan–McClure Motorsports | Chevrolet | 24.348 | 150.369 |
Full Happy Hour practice results

== Qualifying ==
Qualifying was originally meant to be split into two rounds and ran on Friday, February 19; however, due to rain, qualifying was instead condensed into one round and postponed to Saturday.

Qualifying was held on Saturday, February 20, at 10:45 a.m. EST. Each driver would have two laps to set a fastest time; the fastest of the two would count as their official qualifying lap. Positions 26-36 would be decided on time, while positions 37-43 would be based on provisionals. Six spots are awarded by the use of provisionals based on owner's points. The seventh is awarded to a past champion who has not otherwise qualified for the race. If no past champion needs the provisional, the next team in the owner points will be awarded a provisional.

Ricky Rudd, driving for Rudd Performance Motorsports, would win the pole, setting a time of 23.284 and an average speed of 157.241 miles per hour (253.055 km/h).

Four drivers would fail to qualify: Derrike Cope, Buckshot Jones, Billy Standridge, and Rich Bickle.

=== Full qualifying results ===
| Pos. | # | Driver | Team | Make | Time | Speed |
|---|---|---|---|---|---|---|
| 1 | 10 | Ricky Rudd | Rudd Performance Motorsports | Ford | 23.284 | 157.241 |
| 2 | 99 | Jeff Burton | Roush Racing | Ford | 23.293 | 157.180 |
| 3 | 24 | Jeff Gordon | Hendrick Motorsports | Chevrolet | 23.295 | 157.167 |
| 4 | 12 | Jeremy Mayfield | Penske-Kranefuss Racing | Ford | 23.317 | 157.018 |
| 5 | 6 | Mark Martin | Roush Racing | Ford | 23.330 | 156.931 |
| 6 | 2 | Rusty Wallace | Penske-Kranefuss Racing | Ford | 23.334 | 156.904 |
| 7 | 31 | Mike Skinner | Richard Childress Racing | Chevrolet | 23.340 | 156.864 |
| 8 | 11 | Brett Bodine | Brett Bodine Racing | Ford | 23.366 | 156.689 |
| 9 | 18 | Bobby Labonte | Joe Gibbs Racing | Pontiac | 23.368 | 156.676 |
| 10 | 43 | John Andretti | Petty Enterprises | Pontiac | 23.372 | 156.649 |
| 11 | 88 | Dale Jarrett | Robert Yates Racing | Ford | 23.380 | 156.595 |
| 12 | 33 | Ken Schrader | Andy Petree Racing | Chevrolet | 23.387 | 156.549 |
| 13 | 5 | Terry Labonte | Hendrick Motorsports | Chevrolet | 23.408 | 156.408 |
| 14 | 55 | Kenny Wallace | Andy Petree Racing | Chevrolet | 23.410 | 156.395 |
| 15 | 16 | Kevin Lepage | Roush Racing | Ford | 23.420 | 156.328 |
| 16 | 4 | Bobby Hamilton | Morgan–McClure Motorsports | Chevrolet | 23.428 | 156.275 |
| 17 | 42 | Joe Nemechek | Team SABCO | Chevrolet | 23.442 | 156.181 |
| 18 | 3 | Dale Earnhardt | Richard Childress Racing | Chevrolet | 23.445 | 156.161 |
| 19 | 44 | Kyle Petty | Petty Enterprises | Pontiac | 23.447 | 156.148 |
| 20 | 20 | Tony Stewart (R) | Joe Gibbs Racing | Pontiac | 23.448 | 156.141 |
| 21 | 22 | Ward Burton | Bill Davis Racing | Pontiac | 23.458 | 156.075 |
| 22 | 28 | Kenny Irwin Jr. | Robert Yates Racing | Ford | 23.472 | 155.982 |
| 23 | 23 | Jimmy Spencer | Haas-Carter Motorsports | Ford | 23.474 | 155.968 |
| 24 | 9 | Jerry Nadeau | Melling Racing | Ford | 23.475 | 155.962 |
| 25 | 75 | Ted Musgrave | Butch Mock Motorsports | Ford | 23.479 | 155.935 |
| 26 | 21 | Elliott Sadler (R) | Wood Brothers Racing | Ford | 23.489 | 155.869 |
| 27 | 40 | Sterling Marlin | Team SABCO | Chevrolet | 23.494 | 155.836 |
| 28 | 7 | Michael Waltrip | Mattei Motorsports | Chevrolet | 23.498 | 155.809 |
| 29 | 60 | Geoff Bodine | Joe Bessey Racing | Chevrolet | 23.505 | 155.763 |
| 30 | 94 | Bill Elliott | Bill Elliott Racing | Ford | 23.510 | 155.729 |
| 31 | 41 | David Green | Larry Hedrick Motorsports | Chevrolet | 23.533 | 155.577 |
| 32 | 25 | Wally Dallenbach Jr. | Hendrick Motorsports | Chevrolet | 23.558 | 155.412 |
| 33 | 71 | Dave Marcis | Marcis Auto Racing | Chevrolet | 23.571 | 155.326 |
| 34 | 36 | Ernie Irvan | MB2 Motorsports | Pontiac | 23.575 | 155.300 |
| 35 | 58 | Ricky Craven | SBIII Motorsports | Ford | 23.576 | 155.294 |
| 36 | 97 | Chad Little | Roush Racing | Ford | 23.590 | 155.201 |
Provisionals
| 37 | 26 | Johnny Benson Jr. | Roush Racing | Ford | -* | -* |
| 38 | 1 | Steve Park | Dale Earnhardt, Inc. | Chevrolet | -* | -* |
| 39 | 90 | Morgan Shepherd | Donlavey Racing | Ford | -* | -* |
| 40 | 77 | Robert Pressley | Jasper Motorsports | Ford | -* | -* |
| 41 | 91 | Steve Grissom | LJ Racing | Chevrolet | -* | -* |
| 42 | 98 | Rick Mast | Cale Yarborough Motorsports | Ford | -* | -* |
Champion's Provisional
| 43 | 66 | Darrell Waltrip | Haas-Carter Motorsports | Ford | -* | -* |
Failed to qualify
| 44 | 30 | Derrike Cope | Bahari Racing | Pontiac | 23.620 | 155.004 |
| 45 | 00 | Buckshot Jones (R) | Buckshot Racing | Pontiac | 23.702 | 154.468 |
| 46 | 50 | Billy Standridge | Midwest Transit Racing | Chevrolet | 24.080 | 152.043 |
| 47 | 45 | Rich Bickle | Tyler Jet Motorsports | Pontiac | 24.123 | 151.772 |
Official qualifying results

*Time not available.

== Race results ==
| Fin | St | # | Driver | Team | Make | Laps | Led | Status | Pts | Winnings |
|---|---|---|---|---|---|---|---|---|---|---|
| 1 | 5 | 6 | Mark Martin | Roush Racing | Ford | 393 | 50 | running | 180 | $104,635 |
| 2 | 11 | 88 | Dale Jarrett | Robert Yates Racing | Ford | 393 | 0 | running | 170 | $83,675 |
| 3 | 9 | 18 | Bobby Labonte | Joe Gibbs Racing | Pontiac | 393 | 22 | running | 170 | $71,335 |
| 4 | 2 | 99 | Jeff Burton | Roush Racing | Ford | 393 | 228 | running | 170 | $65,195 |
| 5 | 4 | 12 | Jeremy Mayfield | Penske-Kranefuss Racing | Ford | 393 | 0 | running | 155 | $45,610 |
| 6 | 7 | 31 | Mike Skinner | Richard Childress Racing | Chevrolet | 393 | 0 | running | 150 | $53,000 |
| 7 | 13 | 5 | Terry Labonte | Hendrick Motorsports | Chevrolet | 393 | 1 | running | 151 | $46,535 |
| 8 | 29 | 60 | Geoff Bodine | Joe Bessey Racing | Chevrolet | 393 | 0 | running | 142 | $30,710 |
| 9 | 16 | 4 | Bobby Hamilton | Morgan–McClure Motorsports | Chevrolet | 393 | 0 | running | 138 | $47,410 |
| 10 | 6 | 2 | Rusty Wallace | Penske-Kranefuss Racing | Ford | 393 | 0 | running | 134 | $45,910 |
| 11 | 12 | 33 | Ken Schrader | Andy Petree Racing | Chevrolet | 392 | 0 | running | 130 | $46,325 |
| 12 | 20 | 20 | Tony Stewart (R) | Joe Gibbs Racing | Pontiac | 392 | 0 | running | 127 | $36,785 |
| 13 | 14 | 55 | Kenny Wallace | Andy Petree Racing | Chevrolet | 392 | 0 | running | 124 | $28,585 |
| 14 | 40 | 77 | Robert Pressley | Jasper Motorsports | Ford | 392 | 0 | running | 121 | $33,785 |
| 15 | 30 | 94 | Bill Elliott | Bill Elliott Racing | Ford | 392 | 0 | running | 118 | $39,625 |
| 16 | 37 | 26 | Johnny Benson Jr. | Roush Racing | Ford | 392 | 0 | running | 115 | $38,585 |
| 17 | 32 | 25 | Wally Dallenbach Jr. | Hendrick Motorsports | Chevrolet | 392 | 0 | running | 112 | $36,585 |
| 18 | 31 | 41 | David Green | Larry Hedrick Motorsports | Chevrolet | 392 | 0 | running | 109 | $43,544 |
| 19 | 10 | 43 | John Andretti | Petty Enterprises | Pontiac | 392 | 0 | running | 106 | $35,635 |
| 20 | 28 | 7 | Michael Waltrip | Mattei Motorsports | Chevrolet | 392 | 0 | running | 103 | $38,225 |
| 21 | 36 | 97 | Chad Little | Roush Racing | Ford | 391 | 0 | running | 100 | $35,160 |
| 22 | 35 | 58 | Ricky Craven | SBIII Motorsports | Ford | 391 | 0 | running | 97 | $24,135 |
| 23 | 22 | 28 | Kenny Irwin Jr. | Robert Yates Racing | Ford | 390 | 0 | running | 94 | $34,785 |
| 24 | 17 | 42 | Joe Nemechek | Team SABCO | Chevrolet | 390 | 0 | running | 91 | $34,085 |
| 25 | 23 | 23 | Jimmy Spencer | Haas-Carter Motorsports | Ford | 390 | 0 | running | 88 | $34,085 |
| 26 | 38 | 1 | Steve Park | Dale Earnhardt, Inc. | Chevrolet | 390 | 0 | running | 85 | $33,475 |
| 27 | 43 | 66 | Darrell Waltrip | Haas-Carter Motorsports | Ford | 390 | 0 | running | 82 | $23,075 |
| 28 | 21 | 22 | Ward Burton | Bill Davis Racing | Pontiac | 390 | 0 | running | 79 | $33,025 |
| 29 | 34 | 36 | Ernie Irvan | MB2 Motorsports | Pontiac | 389 | 0 | running | 76 | $32,675 |
| 30 | 1 | 10 | Ricky Rudd | Rudd Performance Motorsports | Ford | 389 | 3 | running | 78 | $38,325 |
| 31 | 24 | 9 | Jerry Nadeau | Melling Racing | Ford | 389 | 0 | running | 70 | $25,575 |
| 32 | 39 | 90 | Morgan Shepherd | Donlavey Racing | Ford | 388 | 0 | running | 67 | $60,156 |
| 33 | 8 | 11 | Brett Bodine | Brett Bodine Racing | Ford | 388 | 0 | running | 64 | $29,525 |
| 34 | 33 | 71 | Dave Marcis | Marcis Auto Racing | Chevrolet | 388 | 0 | running | 61 | $22,150 |
| 35 | 42 | 98 | Rick Mast | Cale Yarborough Motorsports | Ford | 387 | 0 | running | 58 | $22,025 |
| 36 | 41 | 91 | Steve Grissom | LJ Racing | Chevrolet | 386 | 0 | running | 55 | $36,584 |
| 37 | 27 | 40 | Sterling Marlin | Team SABCO | Chevrolet | 376 | 0 | running | 52 | $28,925 |
| 38 | 26 | 21 | Elliott Sadler (R) | Wood Brothers Racing | Ford | 361 | 0 | crash | 49 | $29,375 |
| 39 | 3 | 24 | Jeff Gordon | Hendrick Motorsports | Chevrolet | 310 | 89 | engine | 51 | $44,125 |
| 40 | 25 | 75 | Ted Musgrave | Butch Mock Motorsports | Ford | 302 | 0 | running | 43 | $21,775 |
| 41 | 18 | 3 | Dale Earnhardt | Richard Childress Racing | Chevrolet | 275 | 0 | crash | 40 | $36,725 |
| 42 | 15 | 16 | Kevin Lepage | Roush Racing | Ford | 194 | 0 | engine | 37 | $28,875 |
| 43 | 19 | 44 | Kyle Petty | Petty Enterprises | Pontiac | 120 | 0 | engine | 34 | $21,619 |
Failed to qualify
| 44 | | 30 | Derrike Cope | Bahari Racing | Pontiac | | | | | |
| 45 | | 00 | Buckshot Jones (R) | Buckshot Racing | Pontiac | | | | | |
| 46 | | 50 | Billy Standridge | Midwest Transit Racing | Chevrolet | | | | | |
| 47 | | 45 | Rich Bickle | Tyler Jet Motorsports | Pontiac | | | | | |
Official race results

| Previous race: 1999 Daytona 500 | NASCAR Winston Cup Series; 1999 season | Next race: 1999 Las Vegas 400 |
