= 1999 Las Vegas 400 =

Third race of the 1999 NASCAR Winston Cup Series

Race details
- Race 3 of 34 in the 1999 NASCAR Winston Cup Series
- The 1999 Las Vegas 400 program cover.
- Date: March 7, 1999
- Official name: Second Annual Las Vegas 400
- Location: North Las Vegas, Nevada, Las Vegas Motor Speedway
- Course: Permanent racing facility
- Course length: 1.5 miles (2.41 km)
- Distance: 148 laps, 222 mi (357.272 km)
- Scheduled distance: 267 laps, 400.5 mi (644.542 km)
- Average speed: 137.537 miles per hour (221.344 km/h)

Pole position
Driver	Bobby Labonte	Joe Gibbs Racing
- Time: 31.645

Most laps led
Driver	Jeff Burton	Roush Racing
- Laps: 111

Winner
No. 99	Jeff Burton	Roush Racing

Television in the United States
- Network: ABC
- Announcers: Bob Jenkins, Benny Parsons

Radio in the United States
- Radio: Motor Racing Network

The 1999 Las Vegas 400 was the third stock car race of the 1999 NASCAR Winston Cup Series season, the second of five No Bull 5 races of the 1999 season, and the second iteration of the event. The race was held on Sunday, March 7, 1999, in North Las Vegas, Nevada at Las Vegas Motor Speedway, a 1.5 miles (2.4 km) permanent D-shaped oval racetrack. The race took the scheduled 267 laps to complete. In the closing laps of the race, Roush Racing driver Jeff Burton would manage to be victorious in a battle with Bill Davis Racing driver and brother Ward Burton to win his sixth career NASCAR Winston Cup Series victory and his first of the season. To fill out the podium, Ward Burton and Hendrick Motorsports driver Jeff Gordon would finish second and third, respectively.

== Background ==
The layout of Las Vegas Motor Speedway, the circuit where the race was held.

Las Vegas Motor Speedway, located in Clark County, Nevada in Las Vegas, Nevada about 15 miles northeast of the Las Vegas Strip, is a 1,200-acre (490 ha) complex of multiple tracks for motorsports racing. The complex is owned by Speedway Motorsports, Inc., which is headquartered in Charlotte, North Carolina.

=== Entry list ===
- (R) denotes rookie driver.

#	Driver	Team	Make
00	Buckshot Jones (R)	Buckshot Racing	Pontiac
1	Steve Park	Dale Earnhardt, Inc.	Chevrolet
2	Rusty Wallace	Penske-Kranefuss Racing	Ford
3	Dale Earnhardt	Richard Childress Racing	Chevrolet
4	Bobby Hamilton	Morgan–McClure Motorsports	Chevrolet
5	Terry Labonte	Hendrick Motorsports	Chevrolet
6	Mark Martin	Roush Racing	Ford
7	Michael Waltrip	Mattei Motorsports	Chevrolet
9	Jerry Nadeau	Melling Racing	Ford
10	Ricky Rudd	Rudd Performance Motorsports	Ford
11	Brett Bodine	Brett Bodine Racing	Ford
12	Jeremy Mayfield	Penske-Kranefuss Racing	Ford
16	Kevin Lepage	Roush Racing	Ford
18	Bobby Labonte	Joe Gibbs Racing	Pontiac
19	Tom Hubert	Roehrig Motorsports	Ford
20	Tony Stewart (R)	Joe Gibbs Racing	Pontiac
21	Elliott Sadler (R)	Wood Brothers Racing	Ford
22	Ward Burton	Bill Davis Racing	Pontiac
23	Jimmy Spencer	Haas-Carter Motorsports	Ford
24	Jeff Gordon	Hendrick Motorsports	Chevrolet
25	Wally Dallenbach Jr.	Hendrick Motorsports	Chevrolet
26	Johnny Benson Jr.	Roush Racing	Ford
28	Kenny Irwin Jr.	Robert Yates Racing	Ford
30	Derrike Cope	Bahari Racing	Pontiac
31	Mike Skinner	Richard Childress Racing	Chevrolet
33	Ken Schrader	Andy Petree Racing	Chevrolet
36	Ernie Irvan	MB2 Motorsports	Pontiac
38	Butch Gilliland	Gilliland Racing	Ford
40	Sterling Marlin	Team SABCO	Chevrolet
41	David Green	Larry Hedrick Motorsports	Chevrolet
42	Joe Nemechek	Team SABCO	Chevrolet
43	John Andretti	Petty Enterprises	Pontiac
44	Kyle Petty	Petty Enterprises	Pontiac
45	Rich Bickle	Tyler Jet Motorsports	Pontiac
50	Ron Hornaday Jr.	Midwest Transit Racing	Chevrolet
55	Kenny Wallace	Andy Petree Racing	Chevrolet
58	Ricky Craven	SBIII Motorsports	Ford
60	Geoff Bodine	Joe Bessey Racing	Chevrolet
66	Darrell Waltrip	Haas-Carter Motorsports	Ford
68	Ron Burns	Ron Burns Racing	Ford
71	Dave Marcis	Marcis Auto Racing	Chevrolet
75	Ted Musgrave	Butch Mock Motorsports	Ford
77	Robert Pressley	Jasper Motorsports	Ford
88	Dale Jarrett	Robert Yates Racing	Ford
90	Stanton Barrett	Donlavey Racing	Ford
91	Steve Grissom	LJ Racing	Chevrolet
92	Morgan Shepherd	Zali Racing	Ford
94	Bill Elliott	Bill Elliott Racing	Ford
97	Chad Little	Roush Racing	Ford
98	Rick Mast	Burdette Motorsports	Ford
99	Jeff Burton	Roush Racing	Ford
Official entry list

== Practice ==
=== First practice ===
The first practice session was held on Friday, March 5, at 10:30 AM PST. The session would last for two hours and 25 minutes. Mike Skinner, driving for Richard Childress Racing, would set the fastest time in the session, with a lap of 31.828 and an average speed of 169.661 mph (273.043 km/h).

Pos.	#	Driver	Team	Make	Time	Speed
1	31	Mike Skinner	Richard Childress Racing	Chevrolet	31.828	169.661
2	18	Bobby Labonte	Joe Gibbs Racing	Pontiac	31.871	169.433
3	42	Joe Nemechek	Team SABCO	Chevrolet	31.924	169.151
Full first practice results

=== Second practice ===
The second practice session was held on Saturday, March 6, at 9:00 AM PST. The session would last for one hour and 30 minutes. Ward Burton, driving for Bill Davis Racing, would set the fastest time in the session, with a lap of 32.431 and an average speed of 166.507 mph (267.967 km/h).

Pos.	#	Driver	Team	Make	Time	Speed
1	22	Ward Burton	Bill Davis Racing	Pontiac	32.431	166.507
2	1	Steve Park	Dale Earnhardt, Inc.	Chevrolet	32.754	164.865
3	77	Robert Pressley	Jasper Motorsports	Ford	32.769	164.789
Full second practice results

=== Final practice ===
The final practice session, sometimes referred to as Happy Hour, was held on Saturday, March 6, after the preliminary 1999 Sam's Town 300. The session would last for one hour. Jeff Burton, driving for Roush Racing, would set the fastest time in the session, with a lap of 32.942 and an average speed of 163.924 mph (263.810 km/h).

Pos.	#	Driver	Team	Make	Time	Speed
1	99	Jeff Burton	Roush Racing	Ford	32.942	163.924
2	22	Ward Burton	Bill Davis Racing	Pontiac	32.995	163.661
3	94	Bill Elliott	Bill Elliott Racing	Ford	33.110	163.093
Full Happy Hour practice results

== Qualifying ==
Qualifying was split into two rounds. The first round was held on Friday, March 5, at 2:00 PM PST. Each driver would have one lap to set a time. During the first round, the top 25 drivers in the round would be guaranteed a starting spot in the race. If a driver was not able to guarantee a spot in the first round, they had the option to scrub their time from the first round and try and run a faster lap time in a second round qualifying run, held on Saturday, March 6, at 11:30 AM PST. As with the first round, each driver would have one lap to set a time. Positions 26-36 would be decided on time, while positions 37-43 would be based on provisionals. Six spots are awarded by the use of provisionals based on owner's points. The seventh is awarded to a past champion who has not otherwise qualified for the race. If no past champion needs the provisional, the next team in the owner points will be awarded a provisional.

Bobby Labonte, driving for Joe Gibbs Racing, would win the pole, setting a time of 31.645 and an average speed of 170.643 miles per hour (274.623 km/h).

Eight drivers would fail to qualify: Ted Musgrave, Kyle Petty, Robert Pressley, Ron Hornaday Jr., Butch Gilliland, Dave Marcis, Morgan Shepherd, and Ron Burns.

=== Full qualifying results ===
Pos.	#	Driver	Team	Make	Time	Speed
1	18	Bobby Labonte	Joe Gibbs Racing	Pontiac	31.645	170.643
2	7	Michael Waltrip	Mattei Motorsports	Chevrolet	31.735	170.159
3	42	Joe Nemechek	Team SABCO	Chevrolet	31.751	170.073
4	19	Tom Hubert	Roehrig Motorsports	Ford	31.767	169.988
5	31	Mike Skinner	Richard Childress Racing	Chevrolet	31.798	169.822
6	58	Ricky Craven	SBIII Motorsports	Ford	31.838	169.609
7	12	Jeremy Mayfield	Penske-Kranefuss Racing	Ford	31.856	169.513
8	9	Jerry Nadeau	Melling Racing	Ford	31.886	169.353
9	88	Dale Jarrett	Robert Yates Racing	Ford	31.887	169.348
10	28	Kenny Irwin Jr.	Robert Yates Racing	Ford	31.893	169.316
11	24	Jeff Gordon	Hendrick Motorsports	Chevrolet	31.914	169.205
12	5	Terry Labonte	Hendrick Motorsports	Chevrolet	31.952	169.004
13	6	Mark Martin	Roush Racing	Ford	31.957	168.977
14	94	Bill Elliott	Bill Elliott Racing	Ford	31.966	168.929
15	43	John Andretti	Petty Enterprises	Pontiac	31.971	168.903
16	33	Ken Schrader	Andy Petree Racing	Chevrolet	32.017	168.660
17	16	Kevin Lepage	Roush Racing	Ford	32.019	168.650
18	25	Wally Dallenbach Jr.	Hendrick Motorsports	Chevrolet	32.066	168.403
19	99	Jeff Burton	Roush Racing	Ford	32.072	168.371
20	20	Tony Stewart (R)	Joe Gibbs Racing	Pontiac	32.084	168.308
21	45	Rich Bickle	Tyler Jet Motorsports	Pontiac	32.089	168.282
22	98	Rick Mast	Burdette Motorsports	Ford	32.091	168.271
23	41	David Green	Larry Hedrick Motorsports	Chevrolet	32.124	168.099
24	30	Derrike Cope	Bahari Racing	Pontiac	32.136	168.036
25	21	Elliott Sadler (R)	Wood Brothers Racing	Ford	32.148	167.973
26	26	Johnny Benson Jr.	Roush Racing	Ford	32.148	167.973
27	55	Kenny Wallace	Andy Petree Racing	Chevrolet	32.154	167.942
28	11	Brett Bodine	Brett Bodine Racing	Ford	32.160	167.910
29	91	Steve Grissom	LJ Racing	Chevrolet	32.180	167.806
30	22	Ward Burton	Bill Davis Racing	Pontiac	32.232	167.535
31	97	Chad Little	Roush Racing	Ford	32.237	167.509
32	4	Bobby Hamilton	Morgan–McClure Motorsports	Chevrolet	32.254	167.421
33	40	Sterling Marlin	Team SABCO	Chevrolet	32.258	167.400
34	10	Ricky Rudd	Rudd Performance Motorsports	Ford	32.258	167.400
35	00	Buckshot Jones (R)	Buckshot Racing	Pontiac	32.278	167.297
36	60	Geoff Bodine	Joe Bessey Racing	Chevrolet	32.301	167.177
Provisionals
37	2	Rusty Wallace	Penske-Kranefuss Racing	Ford	-*	-*
38	3	Dale Earnhardt	Richard Childress Racing	Chevrolet	-*	-*
39	23	Jimmy Spencer	Haas-Carter Motorsports	Ford	-*	-*
40	36	Ernie Irvan	MB2 Motorsports	Pontiac	-*	-*
41	1	Steve Park	Dale Earnhardt, Inc.	Chevrolet	-*	-*
42	90	Stanton Barrett	Donlavey Racing	Ford	-*	-*
Champion's Provisional
43	66	Darrell Waltrip	Haas-Carter Motorsports	Ford	-*	-*
Failed to qualify
44	75	Ted Musgrave	Butch Mock Motorsports	Ford	32.610	165.593
45	44	Kyle Petty	Petty Enterprises	Pontiac	32.700	165.138
46	77	Robert Pressley	Jasper Motorsports	Ford	33.014	163.567
47	50	Ron Hornaday Jr.	Midwest Transit Racing	Chevrolet	33.051	163.384
48	38	Butch Gilliland	Gilliland Racing	Ford	33.463	161.372
49	71	Dave Marcis	Marcis Auto Racing	Chevrolet	33.526	161.069
50	92	Morgan Shepherd	Zali Racing	Ford	33.800	159.763
51	68	Ron Burns	Ron Burns Racing	Ford	34.092	158.395
Official qualifying results

*Time not available.

== Race results ==
Fin	St	#	Driver	Team	Make	Laps	Led	Status	Pts	Winnings
1	19	99	Jeff Burton	Roush Racing	Ford	267	111	running	185	$336,590
2	30	22	Ward Burton	Bill Davis Racing	Pontiac	267	71	running	175	$217,275
3	11	24	Jeff Gordon	Hendrick Motorsports	Chevrolet	267	1	running	170	$179,400
4	5	31	Mike Skinner	Richard Childress Racing	Chevrolet	267	0	running	160	$133,175
5	1	18	Bobby Labonte	Joe Gibbs Racing	Pontiac	267	25	running	160	$118,540
6	40	36	Ernie Irvan	MB2 Motorsports	Pontiac	267	5	running	155	$95,075
7	38	3	Dale Earnhardt	Richard Childress Racing	Chevrolet	267	0	running	146	$91,350
8	12	5	Terry Labonte	Hendrick Motorsports	Chevrolet	267	7	running	147	$88,600
9	37	2	Rusty Wallace	Penske-Kranefuss Racing	Ford	267	0	running	138	$85,900
10	13	6	Mark Martin	Roush Racing	Ford	267	17	running	139	$92,300
11	9	88	Dale Jarrett	Robert Yates Racing	Ford	266	0	running	130	$85,240
12	15	43	John Andretti	Petty Enterprises	Pontiac	266	6	running	132	$80,700
13	18	25	Wally Dallenbach Jr.	Hendrick Motorsports	Chevrolet	266	0	running	124	$78,300
14	31	97	Chad Little	Roush Racing	Ford	266	0	running	121	$73,000
15	33	40	Sterling Marlin	Team SABCO	Chevrolet	266	2	running	123	$75,300
16	41	1	Steve Park	Dale Earnhardt, Inc.	Chevrolet	266	0	running	115	$70,800
17	7	12	Jeremy Mayfield	Penske-Kranefuss Racing	Ford	266	22	running	117	$73,800
18	16	33	Ken Schrader	Andy Petree Racing	Chevrolet	266	0	running	109	$70,740
19	22	98	Rick Mast	Burdette Motorsports	Ford	266	0	running	106	$60,500
20	28	11	Brett Bodine	Brett Bodine Racing	Ford	265	0	running	103	$70,065
21	17	16	Kevin Lepage	Roush Racing	Ford	265	0	running	100	$65,700
22	2	7	Michael Waltrip	Mattei Motorsports	Chevrolet	265	0	running	97	$64,200
23	21	45	Rich Bickle	Tyler Jet Motorsports	Pontiac	264	0	running	94	$52,800
24	32	4	Bobby Hamilton	Morgan–McClure Motorsports	Chevrolet	264	0	running	91	$66,800
25	43	66	Darrell Waltrip	Haas-Carter Motorsports	Ford	264	0	running	88	$50,800
26	39	23	Jimmy Spencer	Haas-Carter Motorsports	Ford	264	0	running	85	$60,400
27	23	41	David Green	Larry Hedrick Motorsports	Chevrolet	263	0	running	82	$52,000
28	4	19	Tom Hubert	Roehrig Motorsports	Ford	262	0	running	79	$48,700
29	35	00	Buckshot Jones (R)	Buckshot Racing	Pontiac	262	0	running	76	$48,600
30	42	90	Stanton Barrett	Donlavey Racing	Ford	259	0	running	73	$57,725
31	8	9	Jerry Nadeau	Melling Racing	Ford	249	0	engine	70	$50,800
32	36	60	Geoff Bodine	Joe Bessey Racing	Chevrolet	228	0	engine	67	$47,000
33	25	21	Elliott Sadler (R)	Wood Brothers Racing	Ford	219	0	running	64	$56,800
34	24	30	Derrike Cope	Bahari Racing	Pontiac	215	0	running	61	$49,100
35	3	42	Joe Nemechek	Team SABCO	Chevrolet	212	0	running	58	$53,400
36	20	20	Tony Stewart (R)	Joe Gibbs Racing	Pontiac	184	0	running	55	$46,200
37	14	94	Bill Elliott	Bill Elliott Racing	Ford	172	0	handling	52	$52,975
38	26	26	Johnny Benson Jr.	Roush Racing	Ford	160	0	running	49	$53,075
39	6	58	Ricky Craven	SBIII Motorsports	Ford	136	0	handling	46	$45,575
40	27	55	Kenny Wallace	Andy Petree Racing	Chevrolet	131	0	handling	43	$45,375
41	10	28	Kenny Irwin Jr.	Robert Yates Racing	Ford	130	0	crash	40	$52,175
42	29	91	Steve Grissom	LJ Racing	Chevrolet	116	0	crash	37	$45,475
43	34	10	Ricky Rudd	Rudd Performance Motorsports	Ford	115	0	engine	34	$51,975
Failed to qualify
44		75	Ted Musgrave	Butch Mock Motorsports	Ford					
45		44	Kyle Petty	Petty Enterprises	Pontiac					
46		77	Robert Pressley	Jasper Motorsports	Ford					
47		50	Ron Hornaday Jr.	Midwest Transit Racing	Chevrolet					
48		38	Butch Gilliland	Gilliland Racing	Ford					
49		71	Dave Marcis	Marcis Auto Racing	Chevrolet					
50		92	Morgan Shepherd	Zali Racing	Ford					
51		68	Ron Burns	Ron Burns Racing	Ford					
Official race results

Previous race: 1999 Dura Lube/Big K 400	NASCAR Winston Cup Series; 1999 season	Next race: 1999 Cracker Barrel 500
