= Lake Geneva Raceway =

Coordinates: 42.577354°N 88.406115°W

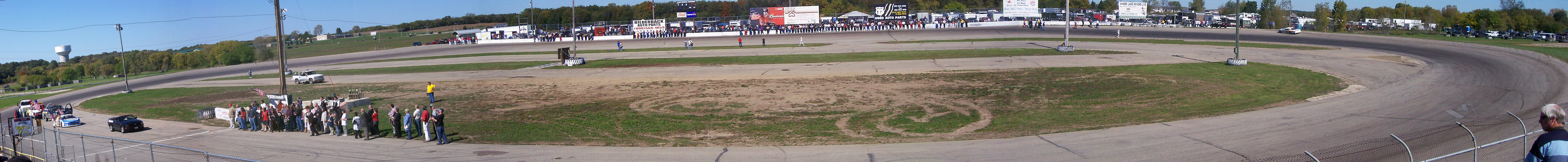
Panorama at the final stockcar races at the track on October 1, 2006

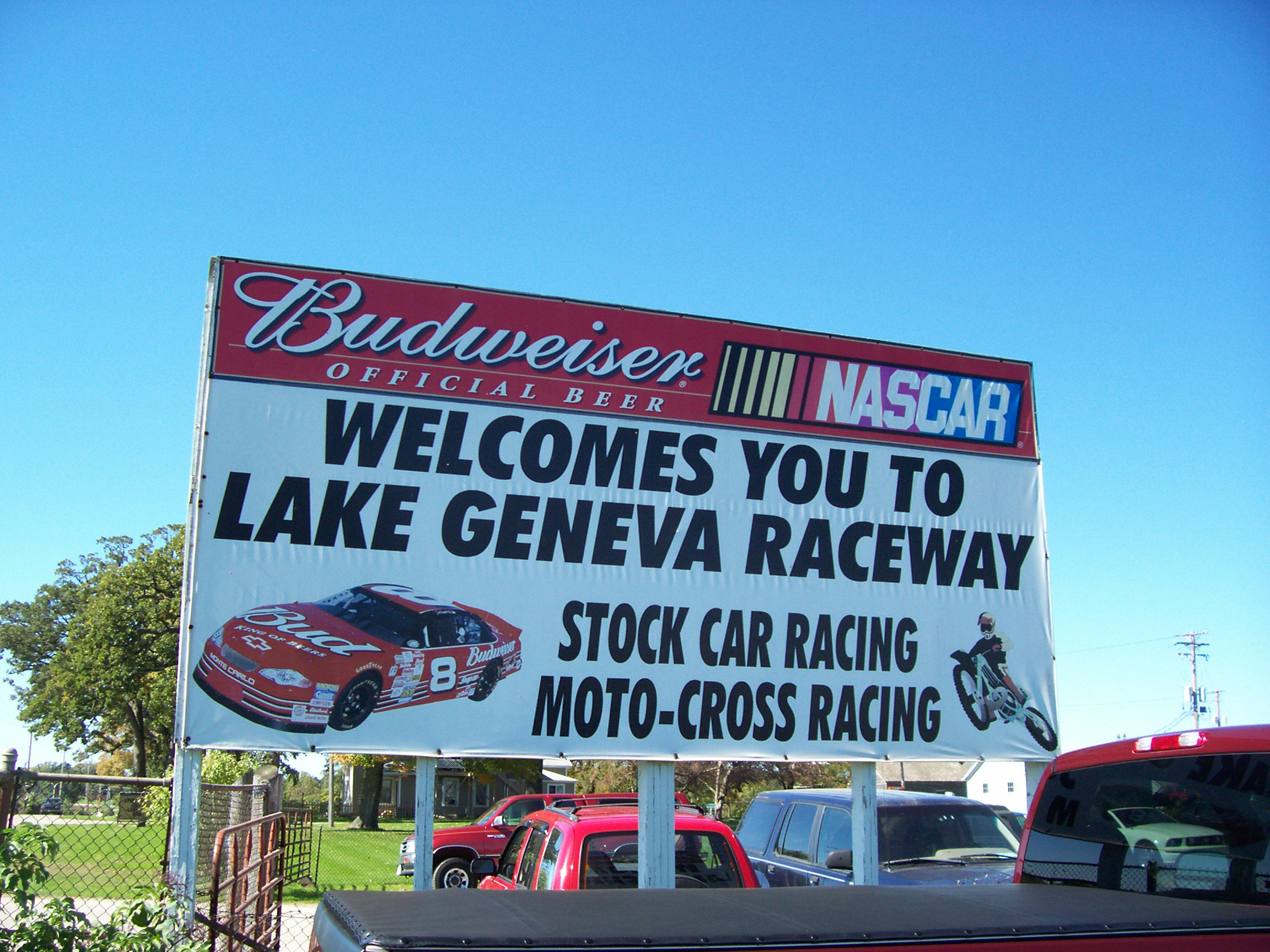
Welcome sign

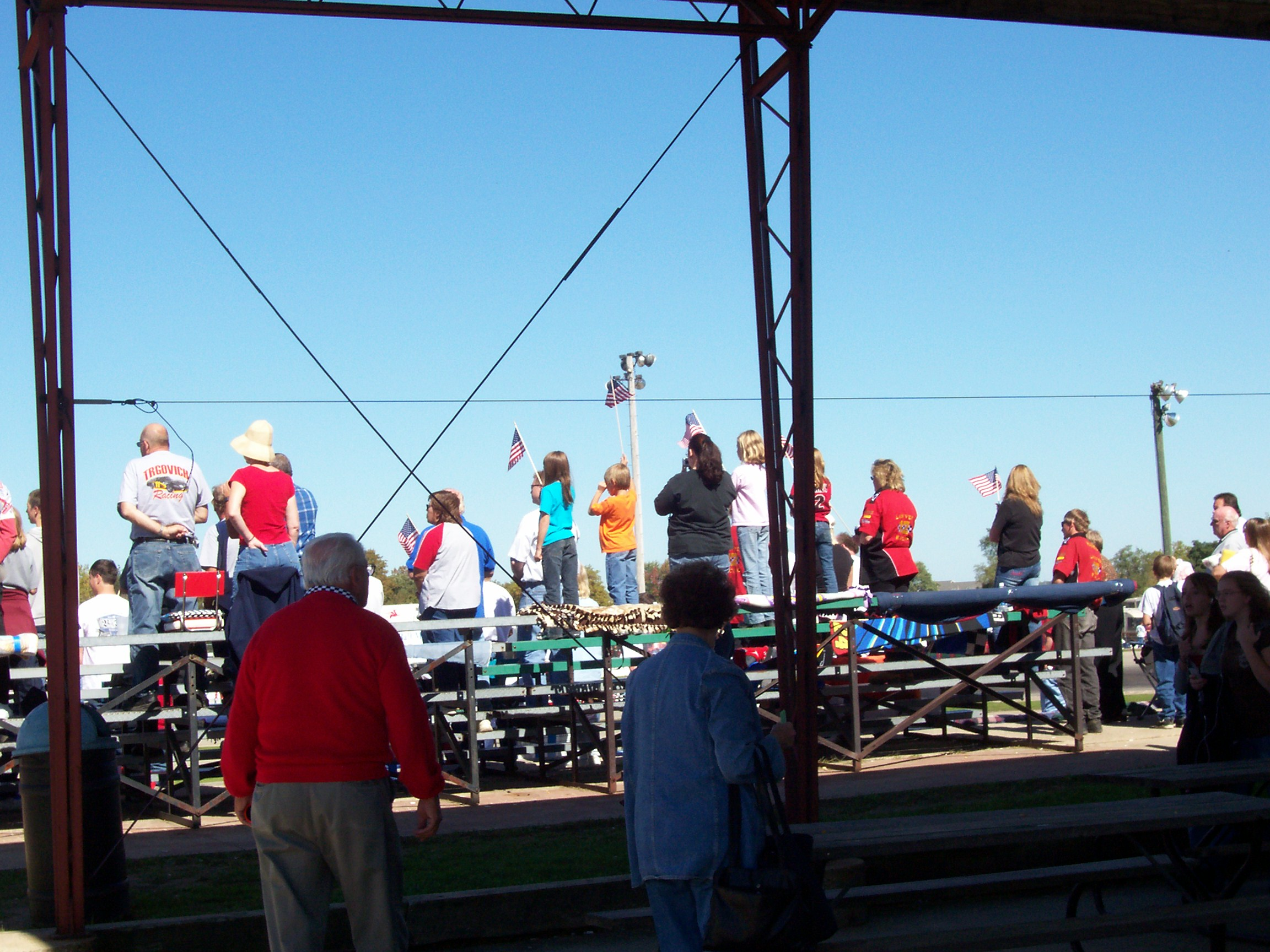
Fans during the final national anthem

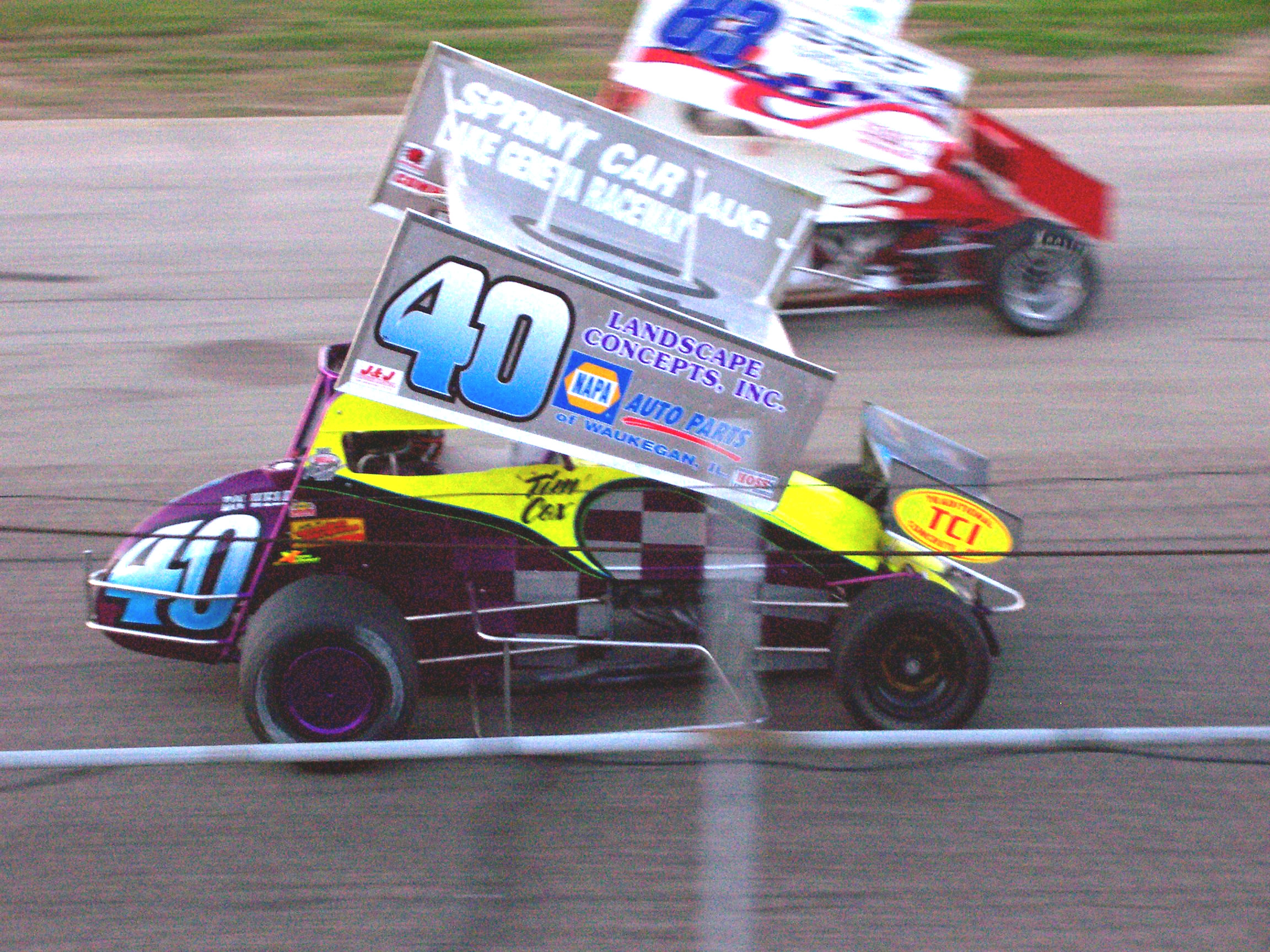
Tim Cox's qualifying track record car

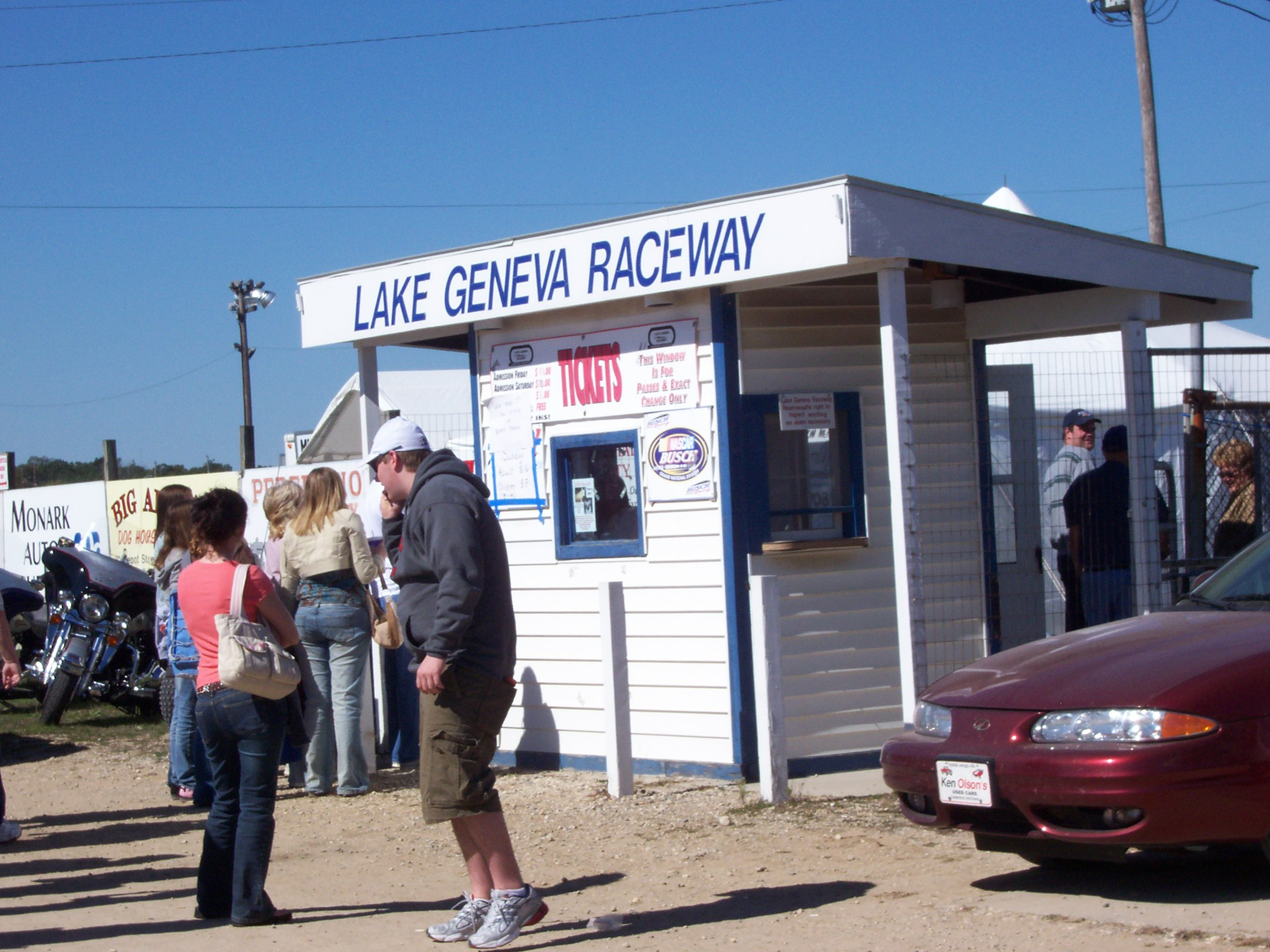
Ticket booth

Lake Geneva Raceway (also known as LGR) was a motocross, demolition derby, off-road racing, stock car, and kart racing racetrack in Lake Geneva, Wisconsin, US. It was billed as "Wisconsin's Busiest Racetrack." The track closed on December 31, 2006, and a nursing home named "Lake Geneva Golden Years" was built on the site.

== History ==
LGR was originally known as the Lake Geneva Speed Center. Promoters generated publicity by building an airplane landing strip, which they used to bring in movie stars. The promoters claimed the starts were part of the huge investment being made to construct a drag strip that would be nationally known. Lake Geneva was the home to a Playboy Club. Contractors got swallowed up in the excitement and worked without upfront payment.

=== Drag strip ===
The track opened on July 3, 1963 as a drag strip. Only 600 fans showed up. The first drag race was won by Fox. Contractors talked to each other after the event, and found out that none of them had been paid. The contractors formed a group and took over the track. The final drag race was held in 1977, and was won by Fritz Barels.

=== Stockcar tracks ===
==== 1/4 mile track ====
A 1/4 mile asphalt stockcar track was constructed in 1966 after the drag racing didn't take off nationally. A group of modified drivers came in from nearby dirt track Wilmot Speedway in Wilmot, Wisconsin after a dispute with insurance. In 1974, Larry Ninneman, who went on to win the track championship at the Slinger Super Speedway, was one of those drivers, and won 6 of 6 events entered. The corners had no banking, which permitted the drag strip to run through the center of the corner. The first modified race was won Pedro Roehl, and the first sportsman race was won by Dennis Burgan. The fast time in the modified cars was 17.58 seconds on the quarter mile. The track opened with a new grandstand for 10,000 fans and a new 300,000 watt lighting system. The modified cars later returned to Wilmot, and raced Saturday nights on the dirt at Wilmot and the asphalt at Lake Geneva on Sunday. Their ability to change setups gained widespread popularity that allowed the outlaw winged sprint cars to race in several states. Modified cars raced three nights per week, and late models were added to Saturday night programs.

==== 1/3 mile track ====
The Dawson family purchased the property in 1985. Kevin and Marylynn Dawson immediately began working to update the entire facility, and eventually reconfigured the racing surface to a 1/3 mile progressively banked stockcar track after the 1989 season. The first event featured modified stockcars, midget cars, and lawn mowers.

==== Special stockcar events ====
The track held an annual October Classic, which frequently featured over 300 entries. The Classic was headlined by the "Small car World Championship". LGR hosted numerous touring series, including annual Mid-American stockcars, and nine ARTGO Super Late Models / NASCAR Midwest Series races between 1998 and 2005.

==== Special sports car event ====
On Oct. 12-13, 1974, LGR was the site of the second-ever Sports Car Club of America Solo National Championships (then also called Solo II), an autocross event put on by the Chicago Region of the SCCA. 249 drivers competed in 15 classes over a serpentine course that utilized both the oval and the dragstrip. Fast time of the event was turned in by Gary Lownsdale who won A Modified in a Lotus Elan S2 with a best run of 52.736 seconds.

==== Final stockcar event ====
The final official stockcar event was held on October 1, 2006, with 275 cars competing. The event began with Hoosier Outlaw Sprint Series driver Tim Cox setting the all-time track record with a lap time of 14.186 seconds, and winning the "quest to set the ultimate lap." The final stockcar event was a 75 lap Super Late Model event. The event featured former NASCAR Winston Cup and Craftsman Truck Series driver and former track regular Rich Bickle starting at the pole. Bickle raced at the track in the 1970s, 1980s, and early 1990s. Bickle led the feature from start to finish to win the final stockcar feature. A few minor events took place before the land was sold.

=== Motocross track ===
The track hosted 125cc and 250cc motorcycle motocross events. The final 2006 season also included four-wheelers (quads). The 2006 season was extended several times, with the final races being held on October 21, 2006.

=== Off-road track ===
The track hosted numerous SODA off-road racing events. The May 1997 event was broadcast on ESPN2, and Jimmie Johnson beat Brendan Gaughan in one of the televised events. Other off-road drivers to compete at the track include: Walker Evans, Evan Evans, Johnny Greaves, and Jack Flannery.

== Notable weekly stockcar drivers ==
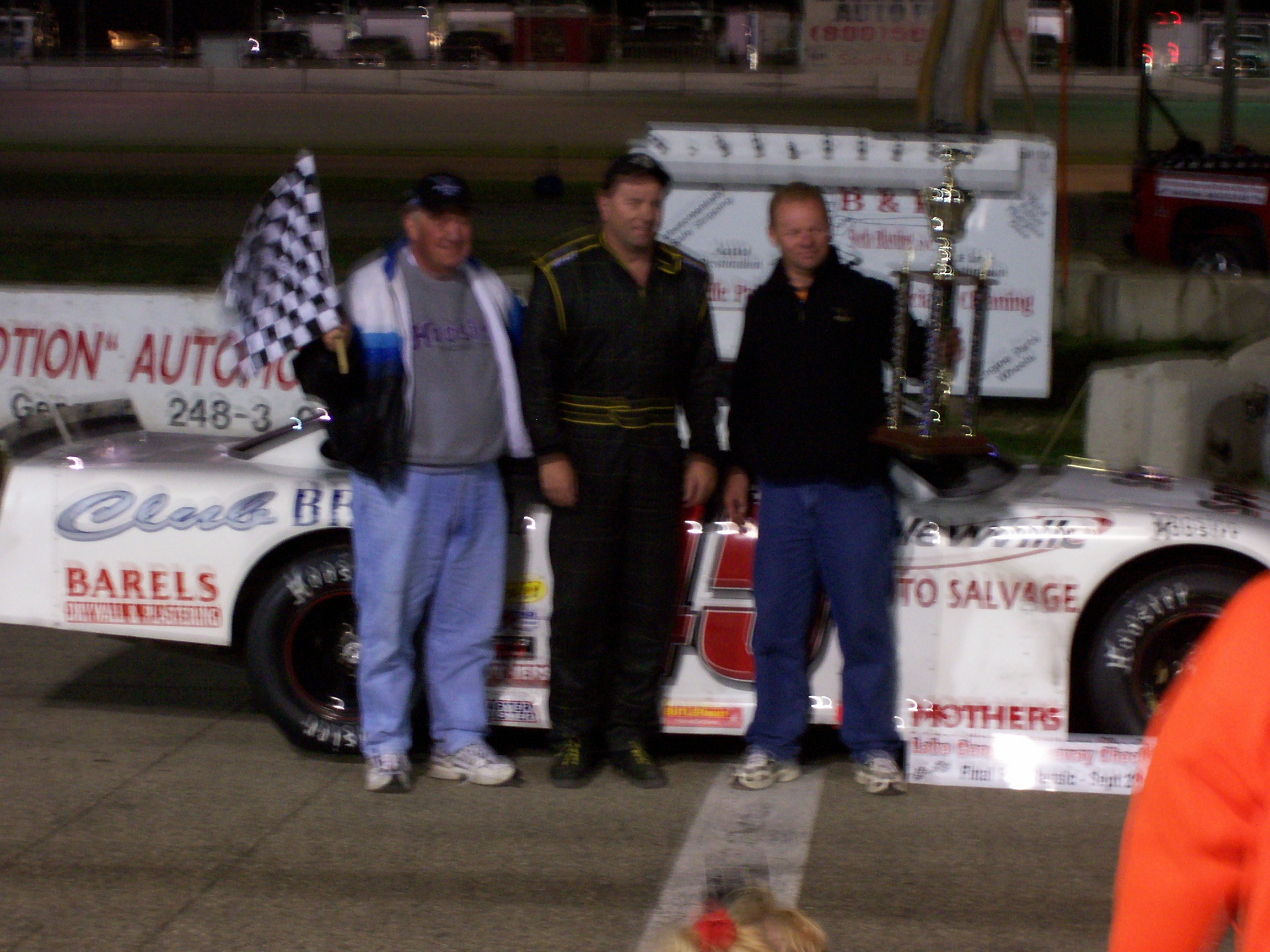
Rich Bickle (center) poses with Fritz Barels and his son Dusty. Fritz won the first drag race held at the facility at the track's "Grand Opening" in 1963. Fritz is seen here celebrating with Bickle after winning the final stockcar event.

- Rich Bickle
- Bay Darnell
- Erik Darnell
- Alan Kulwicki
- Dick Trickle
- Dave Watson (1976 track champion)
- Don Church Junor

== Images ==
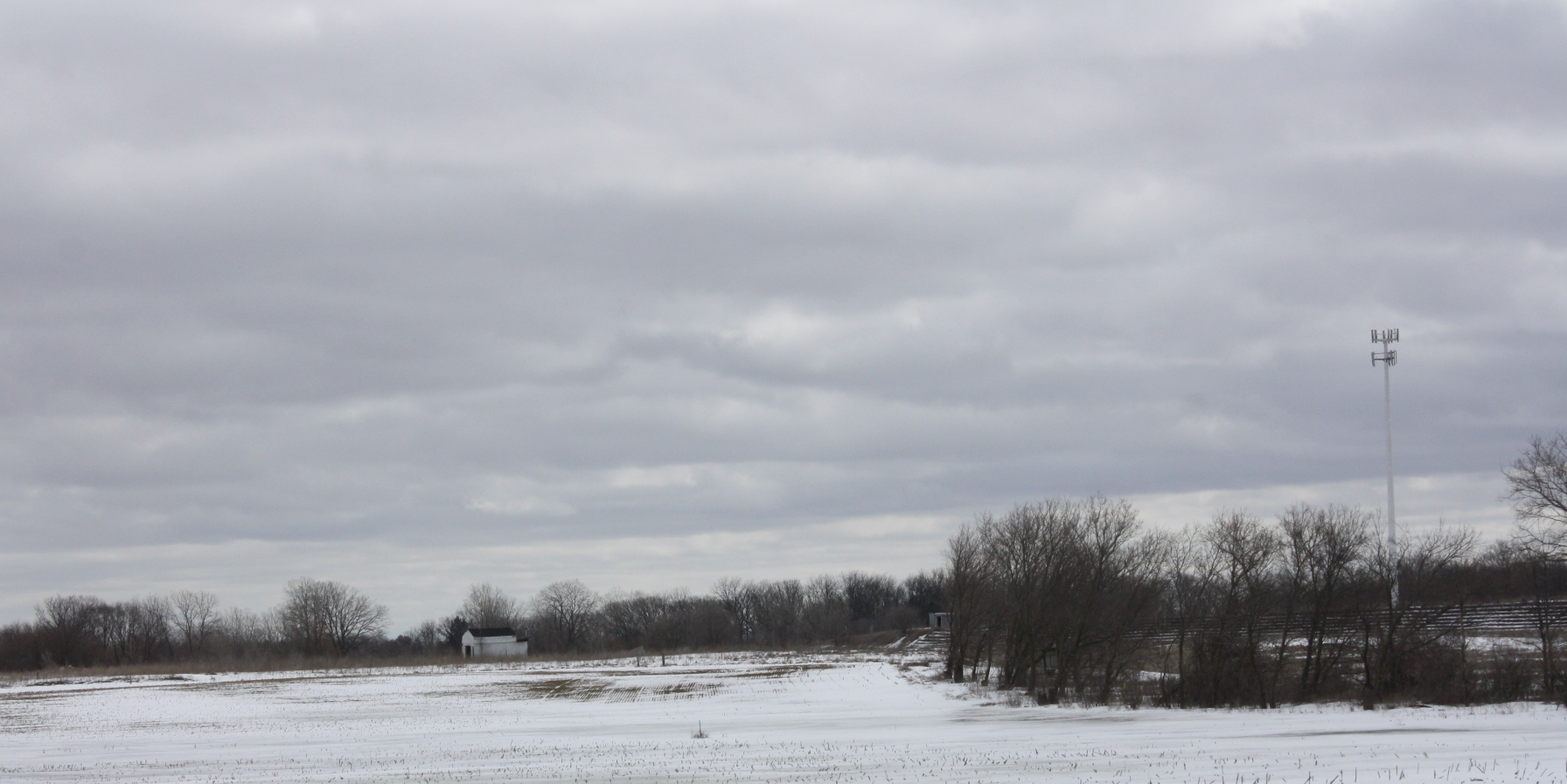
Pits were on the left, track/grandstand on the right

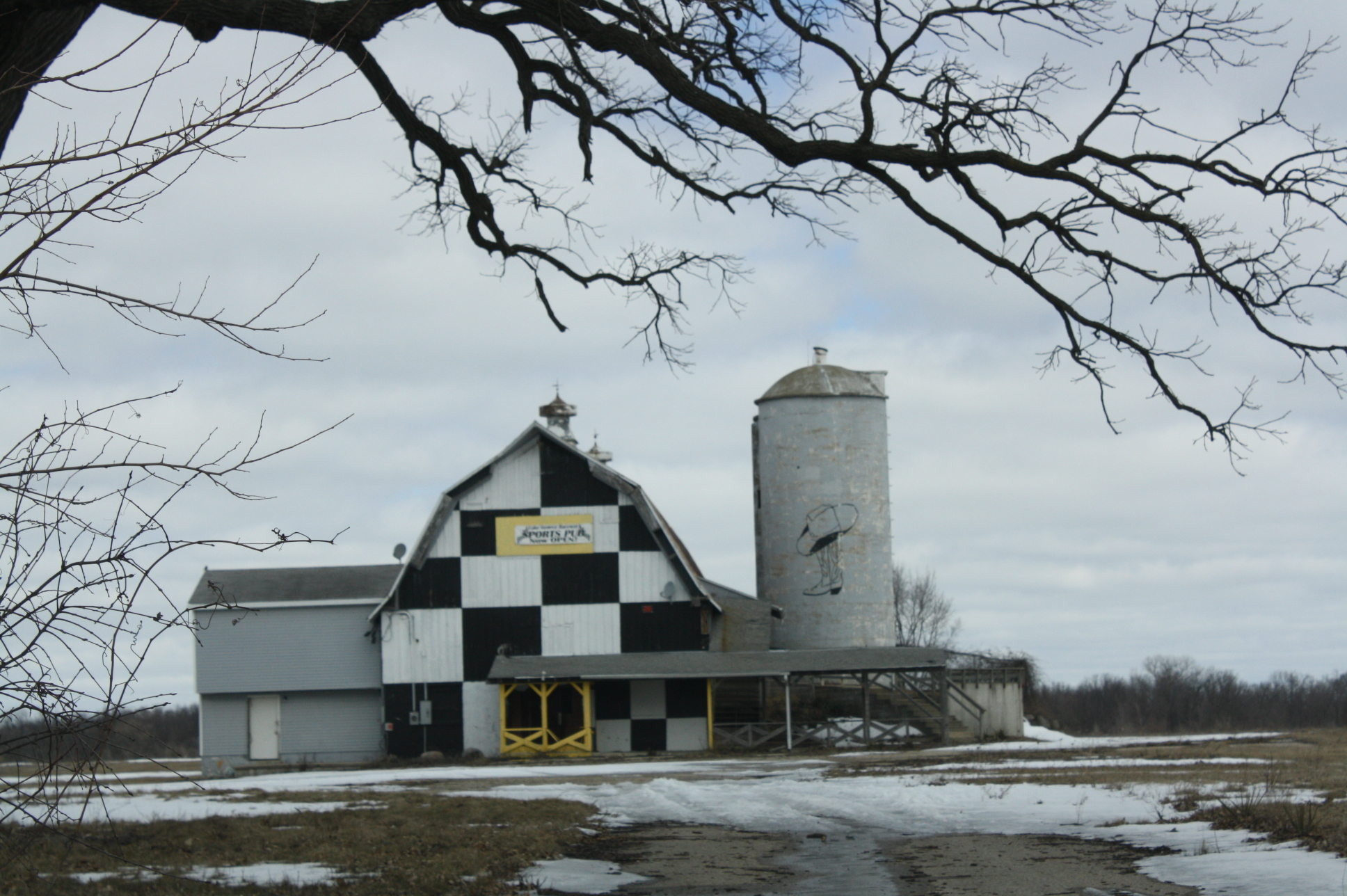
Barn with bar inside
