= Lucas Oil 200 =

Lucas Oil 200 can mean:

- The Lucas Oil 200 (ARCA), an ARCA Racing Series race held at Daytona International Speedway since 1964.
- The Lucas Oil 200 (Dover), a NASCAR Camping World Truck Series race held at Dover International Speedway since 2011.
- The Lucas Oil 200 (Iowa), a NASCAR Camping World Truck Series race held at Iowa Speedway in 2009 and 2010.
