= Rich Bickle =

American racing driver (born 1961)

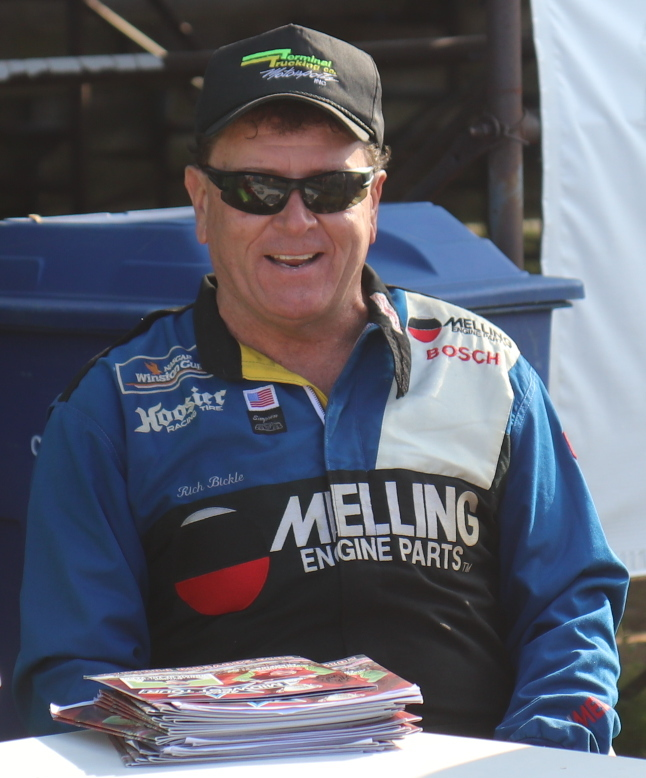
- Bickle at a 2019 race
- Born: Richard Allen Bickle Jr. May 13, 1961 (age 65); Edgerton, Wisconsin, U.S.
- Achievements: 1992, 1996, 2003, 2013 Slinger Nationals Winner; 1990, 1991, 1996, 1998, 1999 Snowball Derby Winner; 1990, 2010 National Short Track Championship Winner
- Awards: Inducted into the Southeastern Wisconsin Short Track Hall of Fame (2015)

NASCAR Cup Series career
- 85 races run over 12 years
- Best finish: 38th (1999)
- First race: 1989 All Pro Auto Parts 500 (Charlotte)
- Last race: 2001 Old Dominion 500 (Martinsville)
Wins	Top tens	Poles
0	3	0

NASCAR O'Reilly Auto Parts Series career
- 54 races run over 7 years
- Best finish: 24th (2001)
- First race: 1994 Busch Light 300 (Atlanta)
- Last race: 2003 Bashas' Supermarkets 200 (Phoenix)
Wins	Top tens	Poles
0	9	1

NASCAR FedEx Freight Truck Series career
- 79 races run over 7 years
- Best finish: 2nd (1997)
- First race: 1996 Florida Dodge Dealers 400 (Homestead)
- Last race: 2005 Toyota Tundra 200 (Nashville)
- First win: 1997 Craftsman 200 (Portland)
- Last win: 1997 Hanes 250 (Martinsville)
Wins	Top tens	Poles
3	34	6

ARCA Menards Series career
- 13 races run over 7 years
- Best finish: 33rd (1989)
- First race: 1989 Daytona ARCA 200 (Daytona)
- Last race: 2021 Lucas Oil 200 (Daytona)
Wins	Top tens	Poles
0	5	2

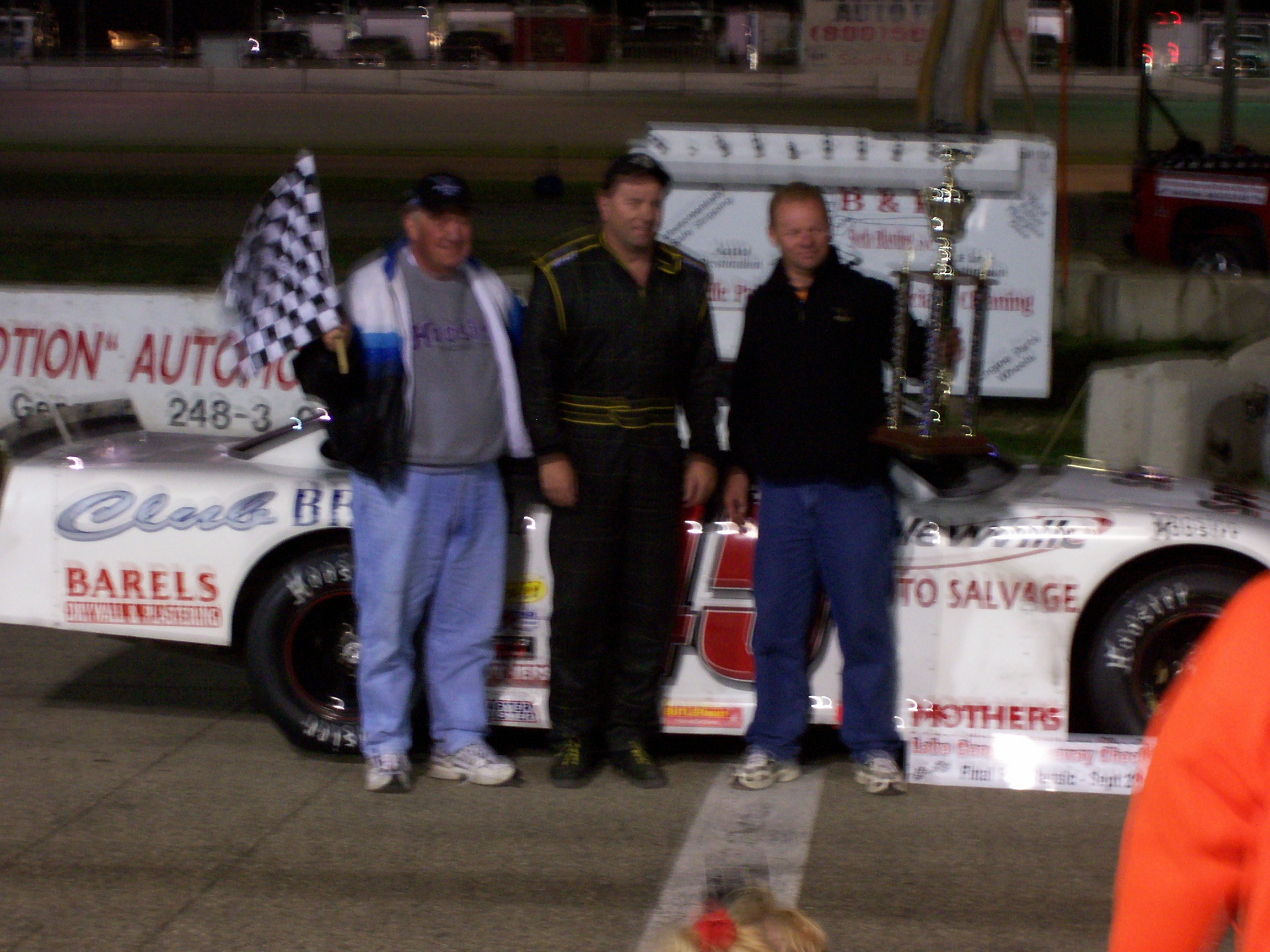
Bickle (center) after winning the final stock car races at Lake Geneva Raceway in 2006

Richard Allen Bickle Jr. (born May 13, 1961) is an American former professional stock car racing driver. Now retired from NASCAR racing, Bickle, who never completed a full season in the NASCAR Cup Series, had a long history in short track racing. The Milwaukee Journal Sentinel described him in 2012 as a "stud on the short tracks in the late 1980s and early '90s and a journeyman who rarely caught a break in NASCAR." He won three NASCAR truck races and had a career-best fourth-place finish in the Cup Series in 218 career NASCAR starts.

== Early career ==
Bickle was introduced to the sport as a child, when he watched his father, Rich Sr., race throughout Wisconsin. The younger Bickle began racing motocross at the age of five. While winning the 250cc championship on Sunday nights when he was sixteen, he raced stock cars at Jefferson Speedway on Saturday nights in 1977. He went behind his father's barn to pick out one of his father's old racecars and selected a beat-up 1968 Pontiac GTO. "It was so beat up you could hardly tell what it was." Bickle began racing a 1974 Pontiac as a sportsman at Jefferson for the second half of the 1977 season and the whole 1978 season. Bickle stopped racing motorcycles after he graduated in 1979. He built a 1972 Ford Torino with a 302 cubic inch motor that year, which he began using at mid-season. He used the car to win a heat and the semi-feature at Columbus 151 Speedway in the car's first night out, and it ran well at Lake Geneva Raceway and Rockford Speedway. That off-season he changed the rear clip on the car to improve it for Rockford before deciding to give away the car and build a new one. In 1980 he raced weekly at Rockford, Lake Geneva, and Capital Speedway (now Madison International Speedway), winning 23 semi-features which was the most in the United States. He was named the Sportsman Rookie of the Year at Lake Geneva and Rockford.

Bickle turned his Rockford car into a late model in 1981 and raced the car to a top-five points finish at Lake Geneva and ninth place at Capital. He raced the car at Slinger Super Speedway and selected ARTGO races. He won his first late model feature that season at Lake Geneva. In 1982, he decided to try to run as many races as he could within 300 miles of his home, and he had raced in between 90 and 100 events by the end of the season. He had won a couple of features and had set fast time at Wisconsin Dells Speedway (now Dells Raceway Park). At the off-season banquet for Slinger Super Speedway, he told track owner Wayne Erickson that he would win the 1983 track championship. Bickle focused on winning Slinger's track championship that year and he finished in the top-five in seventeen of eighteen features that season to win the track championship. In 1984, he raced primarily at Slinger, Wisconsin International Raceway (WIR), and Capital. Bickle won his first half-mile feature at WIR even though he had raced at Capital for several seasons.

Bickle updated his car, hauler, engine, and equipment for 1985 with a new sponsor. He won the season opener at Capital and several other features later in the season en route to winning the track championship. He had a good season at WIR and raced well at the ARTGO races that he ran. In 1986, he won the points championship at Capital Speedway. He had seventeen feature wins that season and he ran well at Slinger, WIR, and Wisconsin Dells. In 1987, he raced at numerous Wisconsin tracks. He won a $15,000-to-win event at Calgary, Alberta, Canada in 1987. Butch Miller, who had led most of the race, went in for a pit stop with 60 laps left, and Bickle and Ted Musgrave gained the lead. The race was halted for rain and hail with 46 laps left, and it was declared over with Bickle receiving the win.

Bickle had won 230 races at various short tracks, including Lake Geneva Raceway, Wisconsin International Raceway, and late model track championships at Slinger Super Speedway in 1983 and 1989. Bickle won the Snowball Derby at Five Flags Speedway a record five times: 1990, 1991, 1996, 1998 and 1999.

== ASA ==
In 1990, Bickle made his debut in the American Speed Association, a Midwest-based racing organization based primarily in short tracks. He finished runner up to Johnny Benson in Rookie of the Year standings.(Ironically, Benson would take over Bickle's old Cup ride in 2000.)

== NASCAR career ==
=== NASCAR Winston Cup ===
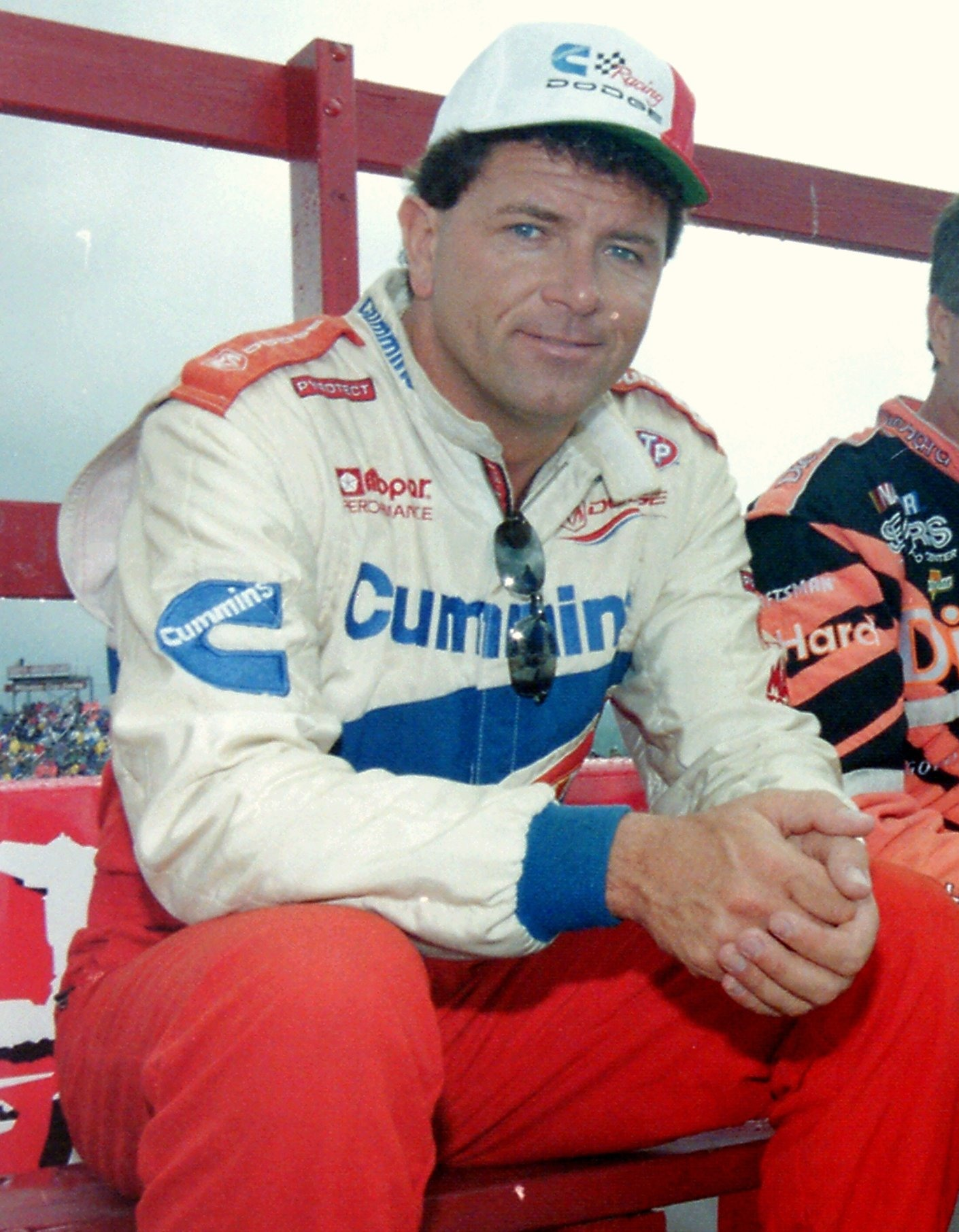
Bickle in 1996

Bickle made his NASCAR Winston Cup debut in 1989 at Charlotte Motor Speedway, in his self-owned, unsponsored No. 02 Buick. He finished 39th out of 42 cars after his engine expired 37 laps into the race. He made his first start in the Daytona 500 the next year when, once again driving his own underfunded Oldsmobile, and finished 28th, five laps down. Bickle competed in eleven events over the next three years (leading one lap at Charlotte in 1993). 1994 marked a then-career-high in terms of starts, driving ten races, most of them for Harry Melling. After years of limited starts, Bickle made the full-time jump to Cup in 1998, driving the No. 98 Thorn Apple Valley Ford Taurus for Cale Yarborough, replacing Greg Sacks who had been critically injured in an accident at Texas. Bickle had two top-five qualifying efforts and finished a career-best fourth at Martinsville and delivered an emotional post-race interview. When the sponsorship went away, Bickle signed with Tyler Jet Motorsports to drive the No. 45 10-10-345 Lucky Dog Pontiac. It was an up-and-down year for Bickle and the team; Bickle posted top-tens at the Pontiac Excitement 400 and the Pocono 500. However he had trouble qualifying for races, and after the Pepsi Southern 500 at Darlington, he was released from the team. Bickle drove some for Melling Racing that year. In 2000, Bickle did substitute duty for Joe Bessey's team, and drove one race for Morgan-McClure Motorsports the following year, in addition to driving once for Midwest Transit Racing.

=== NASCAR Busch Series ===
Bickle found considerably more success in the lower levels of NASCAR than he did in Winston Cup. He made his Busch Series debut in 1993 at Atlanta, finishing 27th with engine failure. Bickle's best season in the Busch Series was 1995, where he won one pole and had four top-ten finishes in a limited schedule. In 2001, he made his first full-time run in the Busch Series, driving the No. 59 Kingsford Chevy, and competed in 27 events before he was released. He has run only one Busch Series race since then.

=== NASCAR Craftsman Truck Series ===
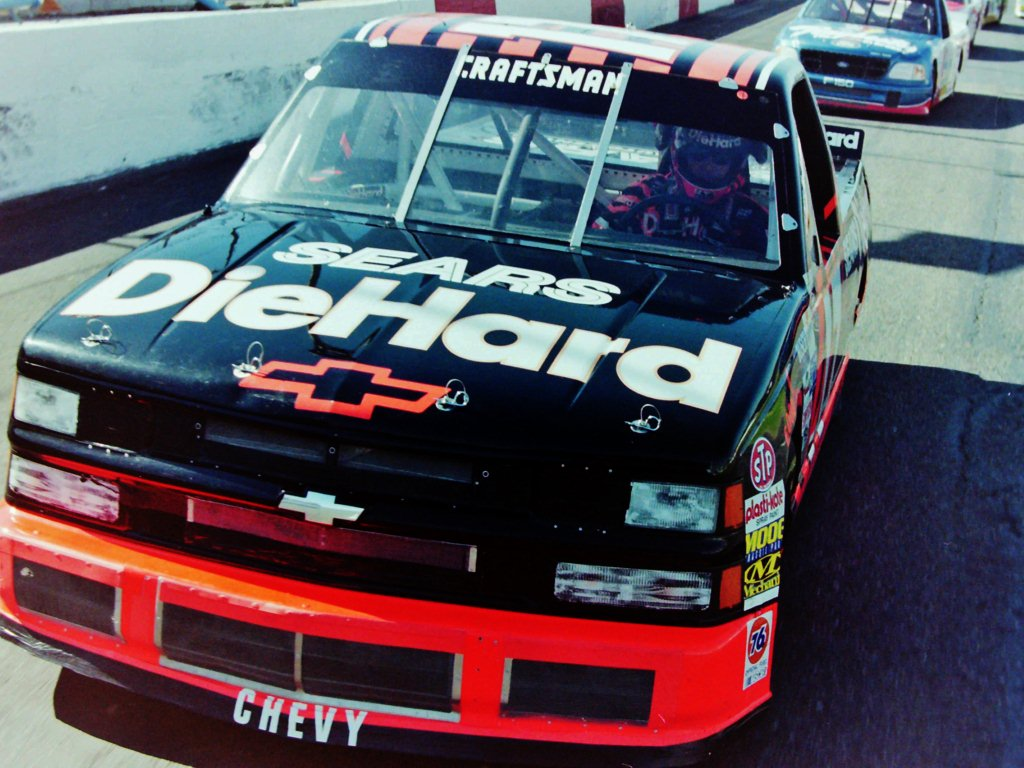
Bickle's 1997 truck

Bickle began racing in the Craftsman Truck Series in 1996 for Petty Enterprises, winning two poles, having nine top-ten finishes, and wound up a solid eleventh in points.

For the 1997 season, Bicklee switched to the No. 17 DieHard Chevrolet owned by Darrell Waltrip Motorsports, and the combination was an instant success. He started four races on the pole position, winning three. Bickle nearly won a fourth race at Sonoma until both a chaotic next-to-last restart occurred as well as rookie Boris Said retaliating against Bickle for contact during that restart; foiling the race for Bickle. When the checkered flag fell on the season, he was second in championship points. Afterwards, he ran a limited schedule in the trucks, the most starts he had in a season since then was twelve in 2003.

== Career after NASCAR ==
Bickle occasionally races at special events at his home tracks in Wisconsin. As of 2007, Bickle planned to open an auto fabrication business in Edgerton with his father, tentatively named Rock County Flatheads and Fabrication. Bickle had owned an auto customization at his racing shop in Mooresville. He began concentrating more being a businessman and by 2012 he operated three businesses. He owned a hot rod shop in Janesville, Wisconsin, a bar in Madison, Wisconsin, and a drive-shaft business in Madison. Bickle is co-owner of a controversial strip club in Bristol, WI.

Bickle built a new chassis that he raced from 2005 until 2010. He was dissatisfied with the car's performance and acquired one of his early 2000s cars back for the 2011 National Short Track Championship at Rockford Speedway. Bickle was second fastest in practice and raced in the top five during the feature. In 2012, he qualified third for the Slinger Nationals behind Kyle Busch and Matt Kenseth. After being sent to the back of the field for early-race contact, he battled his way up to the lead just after half way, and he finished sixth. At the end of the 2012 season, Bickle won the National Short Track Championship race at Rockford Speedway for the second time.

Bickle announced that 2013 would be his final season of racing stock cars; competing for the full season in the ARCA Midwest Tour, he also returned to Slinger Super Speedway where he won his fourth Slinger Nationals after the apparent winner, Steve Apel, was disqualified. Bickle battled for the lead in the middle of the 2013 National Short Track Championship race and ended up finishing fourth. He ended his career on the following weekend finishing 22nd at the Oktoberfest 100 ARCA Midwest Tour race at the La Crosse Fairgrounds Speedway on October 6, 2013. He came out of retirement in 2015 - racing at the Slinger Nationals, Madison, and several races at Wisconsin International Raceway. In 2015, he was inducted in the Southeastern Wisconsin Short Track Hall of Fame citing his two Slinger track championships and four Slinger Nationals wins. Bickle is the subject of a 2019 book Barnyard to Brickyard - The Rich Bickle Story and he announced a book signing tour of Wisconsin race tracks in July 2019. After the signing tour, Bickle continued to race super lates, and in 2020 said that the 2021 Snowball Derby will be his last contest.

Bickle started the 2021 year racing a snowmobile in January at Eagle River, Wisconsin. He won the Outlaw 600 class feature at the Vintage World Championship Snowmobile Derby. After several years away from a major racing series, Bickle would return to run the 2021 ARCA Menards season opener at Daytona for Empire Racing. On May 2, 2021, Bickle won the annual Joe Shear Classic ARCA Midwest Tour race at Madison International Speedway. He won the Jim Sauter Classic ARCA Midwest race at Dells Raceway Park in early September. He was chasing the weekly Super Late Model season track championship at Slinger; on the following Sunday night he won the final race and finished second to Luke Fenhaus for the championship. At the time, he stated in an interview that he had raced at 226 race tracks. Bickle made his final career start at the 2021 Snowball Derby in early December.

Bickle has been one of the most vocal figures pertaining to motorsports today, his main complaint being that young drivers pay for their rides. On one podcast from 2021, Bickle said "Everybody wrecks everybody. They drive through you, and it's because daddy pays the bill...they don't know how to fix the car. They have daddy's money pay for it and fix it." Bickle, a rags-to-riches racer, coined the term "daddy's credit card racers" to describe racers who he views have major funding behind them. Bickle was once quoted as saying "There's too many kids out there with daddy's credit card racing money. They don't know a damn lug nut from a steering wheel, but their dads have millions of dollars and it's the only reason they ever get a shot at it." He later said "Nowadays all you do is just buy your way in...The problem in NASCAR is that they control everything. They have done a great job of wrecking the sport as far as I’m concerned." Bickle also stated in a 2021 podcast after his Daytona ARCA race that racers coming up need to be "knocked upside the head a little bit and their parents should've done it when they were growing up." He later went onto say "on a computer game (young racers) just push reset and they go again. (In real life) when they wreck, they get out of the car, daddy pays for it, and they go again. It's frustrating...They look at me like I'm an antique and I look at them like snotnose brats who shouldn't be here. What pisses me off is as soon as they get out of the car, they're on their phones."

One such incident happened in 2019 when Bickle was involved in an incident with two up-and-coming NASCAR drivers from that time, Carson Hocevar and Harrison Burton. Hocevar had caused an accident between Bickle and Burton during the Last Chance Qualifier during the Snowball Derby. Believing Burton to have caused the incident, an enraged Bickle engaged in an expletive-filled rant against Burton but would later apologize. Bickle has also been critical of Hocevar in the past, uttering threats towards of violence towards him if they ever had another incident.

== Motorsports career results ==
=== NASCAR ===
(key) (Bold – Pole position awarded by qualifying time. Italics – Pole position earned by points standings or practice time. * – Most laps led.)

==== Winston Cup Series ====
NASCAR Winston Cup Series results
Year	Team	No.	Make	1	2	3	4	5	6	7	8	9	10	11	12	13	14	15	16	17	18	19	20	21	22	23	24	25	26	27	28	29	30	31	32	33	34	35	36	NWCC	Pts	Ref
1989	Bickle Racing	02	Buick	DAY	CAR	ATL	RCH	DAR	BRI	NWS	MAR	TAL	CLT	DOV	SON	POC	MCH	DAY	POC	TAL	GLN	MCH	BRI	DAR	RCH	DOV	MAR	CLT; 39	NWS	CAR	PHO	ATL; 22								62nd	143	
1990	Bickle Racing	02	Olds	DAY; 28	RCH	CAR	ATL	DAR	BRI	NWS	MAR	TAL	CLT	DOV	SON	POC	MCH	DAY	POC	TAL	GLN	MCH	BRI	DAR	RCH	DOV	MAR	NWS	CLT	CAR	PHO	ATL								84th	79	
1991	Close Racing	47	Olds	DAY; DNQ	RCH	CAR; 26	ATL; 34	DAR; 24	BRI	NWS; DNQ	MAR	TAL	CLT	DOV; DNQ	SON	POC	MCH	DAY	POC	TAL	GLN	MCH	BRI	DAR	RCH	DOV	MAR	NWS	CLT	CAR	PHO	ATL								51st	237	
1992	TTC Motorsports Inc.	45	Ford	DAY	CAR	RCH	ATL	DAR	BRI	NWS	MAR	TAL	CLT	DOV	SON	POC	MCH	DAY	POC	TAL	GLN	MCH	BRI	DAR	RCH	DOV	MAR; DNQ	NWS; 20	CLT; 25	CAR	PHO	ATL; 34								49th	252	
1993	TTC Motorsports Inc.	45	Ford	DAY; DNQ	CAR	RCH; DNQ	ATL; DNQ	DAR	BRI	NWS	MAR	TAL; 38	SON	CLT; 21	DOV	POC	MCH	DAY; DNQ	NHA	POC	TAL; DNQ	GLN	MCH; 41	BRI; DNQ	DAR	RCH; DNQ	DOV	MAR	NWS; DNQ	CLT; 40	CAR	PHO	ATL; 36							48th	292	
1994	TTC Motorsports Inc.	45	Ford	DAY; DNQ		RCH; DNQ															TAL; DNQ			MCH; 35	BRI	DAR	RCH	DOV	MAR	NWS	CLT; DNQ	CAR		ATL; DNQ						43rd	849	
1994	Melling Racing	9	Ford		CAR; 41		ATL; 37	DAR; 23	BRI	NWS; DNQ	MAR	TAL; DNQ	SON	CLT; 34	DOV	POC; 28	MCH; 30	DAY; 20	NHA; 21	POC; 34		IND; 29	GLN																	43rd	849	
1994	Roulo Brothers Racing	39	Chevy																														PHO; 37							43rd	849	
1995	Dick Brooks Racing	40	Pontiac	DAY	CAR	RCH	ATL	DAR	BRI	NWS	MAR	TAL	SON	CLT	DOV	POC	MCH	DAY	NHA; 38	POC; 30	TAL	IND; 37	GLN	MCH; DNQ	BRI; 31	DAR; 21	RCH	DOV; 35	MAR; DNQ	NWS; 27	CLT; 38	CAR	PHO	ATL						45th	538	
1997	Darrell Waltrip Motorsports	26	Chevy	DAY	CAR	RCH	ATL	DAR	TEX	BRI	MAR	SON	TAL	CLT	DOV	POC	MCH	CAL	DAY	NHA	POC	IND; 34	GLN	MCH	BRI	DAR	RCH	NHA	DOV	MAR	CLT	TAL	CAR	PHO	ATL					65th	61	
1998	Cale Yarborough Motorsports	98	Ford	DAY	CAR	LVS	ATL	DAR	BRI	TEX	MAR; 41	TAL; DNQ	CAL; DNQ	CLT; 24	DOV; 31	RCH; 27	MCH; 27	POC; 32	SON; 31	NHA; 38	POC; 28	IND; 39	GLN; 22	MCH; 28	BRI; 18	NHA; 40	DAR; 19	RCH; DNQ	DOV; 19	MAR; 4	CLT; 17	TAL; DNQ	DAY; 39	PHO; 11	CAR; 18	ATL; DNQ				39th	1773	
1999	Tyler Jet Motorsports	45	Pontiac	DAY; 33	CAR; DNQ	LVS; 23	ATL; 30	DAR; DNQ	TEX; 12	BRI; DNQ	MAR; 11	TAL; 14	CAL; 32	RCH; 10	CLT; 25	DOV; 33	MCH; 24	POC; 24	SON; 21	DAY; 18	NHA; 14	POC; 7	IND; DNQ	GLN; 36	MCH; 28	BRI; DNQ	DAR; 23	RCH												38th	2149	
1999	Melling Racing	9	Ford																										NHA; 20	DOV; 36	MAR; 37	CLT; 39	TAL; 41							38th	2149	
1999	LJ Racing	91	Chevy																															CAR; DNQ	PHO	HOM	ATL			38th	2149	
2000	Joe Bessey Motorsports	60	Chevy	DAY	CAR	LVS	ATL	DAR	BRI	TEX	MAR; 30	TAL	CAL	RCH	CLT	DOV	MCH	POC	SON	DAY	NHA	POC									MAR; DNQ	CLT	TAL; 21	CAR; DNQ	PHO; 35	HOM	ATL			56th	231	
2000	Coulter Racing	61	Chevy																				IND; DNQ	GLN	MCH	BRI	DAR	RCH	NHA	DOV										56th	231	
2001	Midwest Transit Racing	50	Chevy	DAY	CAR	LVS	ATL	DAR	BRI	TEX	MAR	TAL	CAL	RCH	CLT	DOV	MCH	POC	SON	DAY	CHI	NHA	POC	IND; 32	GLN	MCH	BRI	DAR	RCH	DOV	KAN	CLT								56th	137	
2001	Morgan-McClure Motorsports	4	Chevy																														MAR; 31	TAL	PHO	CAR				56th	137	
2001	BAM Racing	49	Chevy																																		HOM; DNQ	ATL	NHA	56th	137	
2003	Conely Racing	79	Chevy	DAY	CAR	LVS	ATL	DAR	BRI	TEX	TAL	MAR	CAL	RCH	CLT	DOV	POC	MCH	SON	DAY	CHI	NHA	POC	IND	GLN	MCH	BRI	DAR	RCH	NHA	DOV	TAL	KAN	CLT	MAR	ATL	PHO	CAR; DNQ		NA	-	
2003	Conely Racing	78	Chevy																																				HOM; DNQ	NA	-	

===== Daytona 500 =====
Year	Team	Manufacturer	Start	Finish
1990	Bickle Racing	Oldsmobile	29	28
1991	Close Racing	Oldsmobile	DNQ	
1993	TTC Motrosports Inc.	Ford	DNQ	
1994	TTC Motrosports Inc.	Ford	DNQ	
1999	Tyler Jet Motorsports	Pontiac	22	33

==== Busch Series ====
NASCAR Busch Series results
Year	Team	No.	Make	1	2	3	4	5	6	7	8	9	10	11	12	13	14	15	16	17	18	19	20	21	22	23	24	25	26	27	28	29	30	31	32	33	34	NBSC	Pts	Ref
1990	Beard Motorsports	00	Pontiac	DAY; DNQ	RCH	CAR	MAR	HCY	DAR	BRI	LAN	SBO	NZH	HCY	CLT	DOV	ROU	VOL	MYB	OXF	NHA	SBO	DUB	IRP	ROU	BRI	DAR	RCH	DOV	MAR	CLT	NHA	CAR	MAR				NA	-	
1994		98	Chevy	DAY; DNQ	CAR	RCH	ATL; 27	MAR	DAR	HCY	BRI	ROU	NHA	NZH	CLT	DOV	MYB	GLN	MLW	SBO																		76th	171	
1994	TTC Motrosports Inc.	45	Ford																		TAL; 42	HCY	IRP	MCH	BRI	DAR	RCH	DOV	CLT	MAR								76th	171	
1994	Gene Petty Motorsports	88	Chevy																												CAR; 37							76th	171	
1995	Virtue Racing	54	Ford	DAY; 5	CAR	RCH	ATL; 13	NSV	DAR	BRI	HCY	NHA; 33	NZH	**CLT**; 8	DOV; 16	MYB	GLN	MLW; 10	TAL; DNQ	SBO	IRP	MCH; 15	BRI	DAR	RCH	DOV; 37	CLT; 41	CAR; 7	HOM; 11									33rd	1220	
1996	Virtue Racing	45	Ford	DAY; DNQ	CAR	RCH	ATL	NSV	DAR	BRI	HCY	NZH	CLT	DOV	SBO	MYB	GLN	MLW	NHA	TAL	IRP	MCH	BRI	DAR	RCH	DOV	CLT	CAR	HOM									NA	-	
1998	Bickle-Smith Motorsports	91	Ford	DAY	CAR	LVS	NSV	DAR	BRI	TEX	HCY	TAL	NHA	NZH	CLT; 33	DOV	RCH	PPR	GLN	MLW	MYB	CAL	SBO	IRP	MCH	BRI	DAR	RCH						HOM; 41				79th	183	
1998	ST Motorsports	59	Chevy																										DOV; 28	CLT	GTY	CAR	ATL					79th	183	
1999	Bickle-Smith Motorsports	91	Ford	DAY	CAR	LVS	ATL	DAR	TEX	NSV	BRI	TAL	CAL	NHA	RCH	NZH	CLT	DOV	SBO	GLN	MLW	MYB	PPR	GTY	IRP	MCH; 39	BRI				CLT; DNQ	CAR; DNQ						64th	516	
1999	HVP Motorsports	63	Chevy																									DAR; 27	RCH; 11	DOV; DNQ			MEM; 39					64th	516	
1999	HVP Motorsports	63	Pontiac																															PHO; 27				64th	516	
1999	Bickle-Smith Motorsports	91	Pontiac																																HOM; 11			64th	516	
2000	Bickle-Smith Motorsports	91	Pontiac	DAY	CAR	LVS; DNQ	ATL; DNQ	DAR; 29	BRI	TEX; DNQ	NSV	TAL	CAL	RCH	NHA	CLT; DNQ	DOV; DNQ	SBO; 5	MYB; 5	GLN	MLW; 35	NZH	PPR	GTY; 41	IRP	MCH; DNQ	BRI	DAR	RCH; DNQ	DOV	CLT; DNQ	CAR; DNQ	MEM	PHO; DNQ	HOM; DNQ			70th	329	
2001	ST Motorsports	59	Chevy	DAY; 16	CAR; 7	LVS; 15	ATL; 29	DAR; 15	BRI; 39	TEX; 23	NSH; 12	TAL; 13	CAL; 29	RCH; 16	NHA; 21	NZH; 8	CLT; 17	DOV; 26	KEN; 27	MLW; 12	GLN; 22	CHI; 28	GTY	PPR	IRP; 9	MCH; 29	BRI; 20	DAR; 25	RCH; 16	DOV; 24	KAN	CLT	MEM	PHO	CAR	HOM		24th	2595	
2003	PF2 Motorsports	94	Chevy	DAY	CAR	LVS	DAR	BRI	TEX	TAL	NSH	CAL	RCH	GTY	NZH	CLT	DOV	NSH	KEN	MLW	DAY	CHI	NHA	PPR	IRP	MCH	BRI	DAR	RCH	DOV	KAN	CLT	MEM	ATL	PHO; 38	CAR; DNQ	HOM	147th	49	

==== Craftsman Truck Series ====
NASCAR Craftsman Truck Series results
Year	Team	No.	Make	1	2	3	4	5	6	7	8	9	10	11	12	13	14	15	16	17	18	19	20	21	22	23	24	25	26	27	NCTC	Pts	Ref
1996	Petty Enterprises	43	Dodge	HOM; 21	PHO; 30	**POR**; 27	EVG; 4	TUS; 2*	**CNS**; 32	HPT; 12	BRI; 19	NZH; 15	MLW; 20	LVL; 27	I70; 10	IRP; 5	FLM; 3	GLN; 5	NSV; 18	RCH; 16	NHA; 12	MAR; 7	NWS; 8	SON; 29	MMR; 8	PHO; 11	LVS; 11				11th	2914	
1997	Darrell Waltrip Motorsports	17	Chevy	WDW; 3	TUS; 2	HOM; 11	PHO; 5	**POR**; 1*	**EVG**; 1*	**I70**; 4	NHA; 20	TEX; 21	BRI; 2	NZH; 4	MLW; 3	LVL; 5	CNS; 5	HPT; 23	IRP; 10	FLM; 3	NSV; 6	GLN; 16	RCH; 4	**MAR**; 1*	SON; 12	MMR; 5	CAL; 26	PHO; 18	LVS; 16		2nd	3737	
1998	PacWest S/T Motorsports	78	Dodge	WDW; 10																											43rd	551	
1998	Tyler Jet Motorsports	17	Chevy		HOM; 17	PHO	POR	EVG	I70	GLN	TEX	BRI	MLW	NZH	CAL	PPR	IRP	NHA	FLM	NSV	HPT	LVL									43rd	551	
1998	Billy Ballew Motorsports	15	Ford																				RCH; 6	MEM	GTY	MAR; 5	SON	MMR	PHO	LVS	43rd	551	
1999	Bickle-Smith Motorsports	45	Ford	HOM	PHO	EVG	MMR	MAR; 36	MEM	PPR	I70	BRI	TEX	PIR	GLN	MLW	NSV	NZH	MCH	NHA	IRP	GTY	HPT	RCH; 7	LVS	LVL	TEX	CAL			66th	201	
2002	Billy Ballew Motorsports	15	Ford	DAY	DAR	MAR	GTY	PPR	DOV	TEX	MEM; 6	MLW; 11	KAN; 13	KEN; 15	NHA; 12	MCH; 12	IRP	NSH	RCH	TEX	SBO	LVS	CAL	PHO	HOM						28th	776	
2003	Green Light Racing	07	Chevy	DAY; 19	DAR	MMR																									22nd	1288	
2003	Fasscore Motorsports	9	Ford				MAR; 8																								22nd	1288	
2003	Billy Ballew Motorsports	15	Ford					CLT; 10	DOV; 32	TEX; 24														SBO; 12	TEX	MAR; 12	PHO; 33	HOM; 22			22nd	1288	
2003	Billy Ballew Motorsports	15	Dodge								MEM; 12	MLW; 27	KAN; 13	KEN	GTW	MCH	IRP	NSH	BRI	RCH	NHA	CAL	LVS								22nd	1288	
2005	Green Light Racing	08	Chevy	DAY	CAL	ATL	MAR	GTY; 36	MFD; 5	CLT				MLW; 28	KAN	KEN	MEM	IRP													47th	458	
2005	Green Light Racing	07	Chevy								DOV; 27	TEX	MCH						NSH; 27	BRI	RCH	NHA	LVS	MAR	ATL	TEX	PHO	HOM			47th	458	

=== ARCA Menards Series ===
(key) (Bold – Pole position awarded by qualifying time. Italics – Pole position earned by points standings or practice time. * – Most laps led.)

ARCA Menards Series results
Year	Team	No.	Make	1	2	3	4	5	6	7	8	9	10	11	12	13	14	15	16	17	18	19	20	21	22	23	24	25	AMSC	Pts	Ref
1989	Bickle Racing	65	Chevy	DAY; 29	ATL	KIL	TAL; 2	FRS	POC	KIL	HAG	POC	TAL; 34	DEL	FRS	ISF													33rd	-	
1989	Venturini Motorsports	25	Chevy														TOL; 4	DSF	SLM	ATL									33rd	-	
1990	Bickle Racing	65	Chevy	DAY; DNQ	ATL	KIL	TAL	FRS	POC	KIL	TOL	HAG	POC	TAL	MCH	ISF	TOL	DSF	WIN	DEL	ATL								NA	-	
1991	Roulo Brothers Racing	26	Chevy	DAY	ATL	KIL	TAL	TOL	FRS	POC	MCH; 3	KIL	FRS	DEL	POC	TAL	HPT	MCH	ISF	TOL	DSF	TWS	ATL						102nd	-	
1992	Roulo Brothers Racing	39	Chevy	DAY	**FIF**; 23	TWS	TAL	TOL	KIL	POC	MCH	FRS	KIL	NSH	DEL; 3	POC	HPT	FRS	ISF	TOL	DSF	TWS	SLM	ATL; 39					59th	-	
1993	Roulo Brothers Racing	39	Chevy	DAY	FIF; 18	TWS	TAL	KIL	CMS	FRS	TOL	POC	MCH	FRS	POC	KIL	ISF	DSF	TOL	SLM	WIN								65th	-	
1993	TTC Motrosports Inc.	45	Ford																			ATL; 34							65th	-	
1994	TTC Motrosports Inc.	45	Ford	DAY	TAL	FIF	LVL	KIL	TOL	FRS	MCH; 42	DMS	POC	POC	KIL	FRS	INF	I70	ISF	DSF	TOL	SLM	WIN	ATL					112th	-	
1996	Darrell Waltrip Motorsports	11	Chevy	DAY	ATL	SLM	TAL	FIF	LVL	CLT	CLT	KIL	FRS	POC	MCH	FRS	TOL	POC	MCH	INF	SBS	ISF	DSF	KIL	SLM	WIN	CLT	**ATL**; 4	127th	-	
2021	Empire Racing	45	Chevy	DAY; 15	PHO	TAL	KAN	TOL	CLT	MOH	POC	ELK	BLN	IOW	WIN	GLN	MCH	ISF	MLW	DSF	BRI	SLM	KAN						97th	29	

== Autobiography ==
- Barnyard To Brickyard - The Rich Bickle Story, John Close.

Achievements
Preceded by Bobby Gill	Snowball Derby Winner; 1998, 1999	Succeeded by Gary St. Amant
Preceded by Jeff Purvis	Snowball Derby Winner; 1996	Succeeded by Bobby Gill
Preceded by Rick Crawford	Snowball Derby Winner; 1990, 1991	Succeeded by Gary St. Amant
