= 1994 First Union 400 =

Seventh race of the 1994 NASCAR Winston Cup Series

Race details
- Race 7 of 31 in the 1994 NASCAR Winston Cup Series
- The 1994 First Union 400 program cover, featuring Rusty Wallace.
- Date: April 17, 1994
- Official name: 44th Annual First Union 400
- Location: North Wilkesboro Speedway, North Wilkesboro, North Carolina
- Course: Permanent racing facility
- Course length: 0.625 miles (1.006 km)
- Distance: 400 laps, 250 mi (402.336 km)
- Scheduled distance: 400 laps, 250 mi (402.336 km)
- Average speed: 95.816 miles per hour (154.201 km/h)
- Attendance: 50,500

Pole position
Driver	Ernie Irvan	Robert Yates Racing
- Time: 18.905

Most laps led
Driver	Ernie Irvan	Robert Yates Racing
- Laps: 320

Winner
No. 5	Terry Labonte	Hendrick Motorsports

Television in the United States
- Network: ESPN
- Announcers: Bob Jenkins, Ned Jarrett, Benny Parsons

Radio in the United States
- Radio: Motor Racing Network

The 1994 First Union 400 was the seventh stock car race of the 1994 NASCAR Winston Cup Series season and the 44th iteration of the event. The race was held on Sunday, April 17, 1994, in North Wilkesboro, North Carolina at the North Wilkesboro Speedway, a 0.625 miles (1.006 km) oval short track. The race took the scheduled 400 laps to complete. In a late-race charge, Hendrick Motorsports driver Terry Labonte would make a pass for the lead with 30 to go and hold off the field to take his 12th career NASCAR Winston Cup Series victory, his first victory of the season, and his first win in 135 races, having not won since the 1989 Talladega DieHard 500. To fill out the top three, Penske Racing South driver Rusty Wallace and Robert Yates Racing driver Ernie Irvan would finish second and third, respectively.

== Background ==
The layout of North Wilkesboro Speedway, the venue where the race was held.

North Wilkesboro Speedway is a short oval racetrack located on U.S. Route 421, about five miles east of the town of North Wilkesboro, North Carolina, or 80 miles north of Charlotte. It measures 0.625 mi (1.006 km) and features a unique uphill backstretch and downhill frontstretch. It has previously held races in NASCAR's top three series, including 93 Winston Cup Series races. The track, a NASCAR original, operated from 1949, NASCAR's inception, until the track's original closure in 1996. The speedway briefly reopened in 2010 and hosted several stock car series races before closing again in the spring of 2011. It was re-opened in August 2022 for grassroots racing.

=== Entry list ===
- (R) denotes rookie driver.

#	Driver	Team	Make
1	Rick Mast	Precision Products Racing	Ford
2	Rusty Wallace	Penske Racing South	Ford
02	Curtis Markham	Taylor Racing	Ford
3	Dale Earnhardt	Richard Childress Racing	Chevrolet
4	Sterling Marlin	Morgan–McClure Motorsports	Chevrolet
5	Terry Labonte	Hendrick Motorsports	Chevrolet
6	Mark Martin	Roush Racing	Ford
7	Geoff Bodine	Geoff Bodine Racing	Ford
8	Jeff Burton (R)	Stavola Brothers Racing	Ford
9	Rich Bickle	Melling Racing	Ford
10	Ricky Rudd	Rudd Performance Motorsports	Ford
11	Bill Elliott	Junior Johnson & Associates	Ford
12	Chuck Bown	Bobby Allison Motorsports	Ford
14	John Andretti (R)	Hagan Racing	Chevrolet
15	Lake Speed	Bud Moore Engineering	Ford
16	Ted Musgrave	Roush Racing	Ford
17	Darrell Waltrip	Darrell Waltrip Motorsports	Chevrolet
18	Dale Jarrett	Joe Gibbs Racing	Chevrolet
19	Loy Allen Jr. (R)	TriStar Motorsports	Ford
21	Morgan Shepherd	Wood Brothers Racing	Ford
22	Bobby Labonte	Bill Davis Racing	Pontiac
23	Hut Stricklin	Travis Carter Enterprises	Ford
24	Jeff Gordon	Hendrick Motorsports	Chevrolet
25	Ken Schrader	Hendrick Motorsports	Chevrolet
26	Brett Bodine	King Racing	Ford
27	Jimmy Spencer	Junior Johnson & Associates	Ford
28	Ernie Irvan	Robert Yates Racing	Ford
29	Steve Grissom	Diamond Ridge Motorsports	Chevrolet
30	Michael Waltrip	Bahari Racing	Pontiac
31	Ward Burton	A.G. Dillard Motorsports	Chevrolet
32	Dick Trickle	Active Motorsports	Chevrolet
33	Harry Gant	Leo Jackson Motorsports	Chevrolet
40	Bobby Hamilton	SABCO Racing	Pontiac
41	Joe Nemechek (R)	Larry Hedrick Motorsports	Chevrolet
42	Kyle Petty	SABCO Racing	Pontiac
43	Wally Dallenbach Jr.	Petty Enterprises	Pontiac
52	Mike Skinner	Jimmy Means Racing	Ford
55	Jimmy Hensley	RaDiUs Motorsports	Ford
62	Freddie Query	Gray Racing	Ford
71	Dave Marcis	Marcis Auto Racing	Chevrolet
75	Todd Bodine	Butch Mock Motorsports	Ford
77	Greg Sacks	U.S. Motorsports Inc.	Ford
78	Jay Hedgecock	Triad Motorsports	Ford
90	Mike Wallace (R)	Donlavey Racing	Ford
95	Jeremy Mayfield (R)	Sadler Brothers Racing	Ford
98	Derrike Cope	Cale Yarborough Motorsports	Ford

== Qualifying ==
Qualifying was split into two rounds. The first round was held on Friday, April 15, at 3:00 PM EST. Each driver would have one lap to set a time. During the first round, the top 20 drivers in the round would be guaranteed a starting spot in the race. If a driver was not able to guarantee a spot in the first round, they had the option to scrub their time from the first round and try and run a faster lap time in a second round qualifying run, held on Saturday, April 16, at 12:15 PM EST. As with the first round, each driver would have one lap to set a time. For this specific race, positions 21-34 would be decided on time, and depending on who needed it, a select amount of positions were given to cars who had not otherwise qualified but were high enough in owner's points; which was usually two. If needed, a past champion who did not qualify on either time or provisionals could use a champion's provisional, adding one more spot to the field.

Ernie Irvan, driving for Robert Yates Racing, won the pole, setting a time of 18.905 and an average speed of 119.016 mph (191.538 km/h) in the first round.

Ten drivers would fail to qualify.

=== Full qualifying results ===
Pos.	#	Driver	Team	Make	Time	Speed
1	28	Ernie Irvan	Robert Yates Racing	Ford	18.905	119.016
2	26	Brett Bodine	King Racing	Ford	18.934	118.834
3	16	Ted Musgrave	Roush Racing	Ford	18.939	118.802
4	11	Bill Elliott	Junior Johnson & Associates	Ford	18.987	118.502
5	7	Geoff Bodine	Geoff Bodine Racing	Ford	19.011	118.353
6	77	Greg Sacks	U.S. Motorsports Inc.	Ford	19.024	118.272
7	4	Sterling Marlin	Morgan–McClure Motorsports	Chevrolet	19.030	118.234
8	27	Jimmy Spencer	Junior Johnson & Associates	Ford	19.054	118.085
9	25	Ken Schrader	Hendrick Motorsports	Chevrolet	19.064	118.023
10	5	Terry Labonte	Hendrick Motorsports	Chevrolet	19.070	117.986
11	95	Jeremy Mayfield (R)	Sadler Brothers Racing	Ford	19.079	117.931
12	24	Jeff Gordon	Hendrick Motorsports	Chevrolet	19.085	117.894
13	6	Mark Martin	Roush Racing	Ford	19.092	117.850
14	23	Hut Stricklin	Travis Carter Enterprises	Ford	19.099	117.807
15	21	Morgan Shepherd	Wood Brothers Racing	Ford	19.106	117.764
16	2	Rusty Wallace	Penske Racing South	Ford	19.107	117.758
17	1	Rick Mast	Precision Products Racing	Ford	19.157	117.451
18	30	Michael Waltrip	Bahari Racing	Pontiac	19.169	117.377
19	3	Dale Earnhardt	Richard Childress Racing	Chevrolet	19.192	117.236
20	71	Dave Marcis	Marcis Auto Racing	Chevrolet	19.196	117.212
Failed to lock in Round 1
21	12	Chuck Bown	Bobby Allison Motorsports	Ford	19.197	117.206
22	98	Derrike Cope	Cale Yarborough Motorsports	Ford	19.218	117.078
23	14	John Andretti (R)	Hagan Racing	Chevrolet	19.226	117.029
24	40	Bobby Hamilton	SABCO Racing	Pontiac	19.238	116.956
25	10	Ricky Rudd	Rudd Performance Motorsports	Ford	19.255	116.853
26	75	Todd Bodine	Butch Mock Motorsports	Ford	19.257	116.841
27	43	Wally Dallenbach Jr.	Petty Enterprises	Pontiac	19.261	116.816
28	42	Kyle Petty	SABCO Racing	Pontiac	19.275	116.732
29	15	Lake Speed	Bud Moore Engineering	Ford	19.280	116.701
30	33	Harry Gant	Leo Jackson Motorsports	Chevrolet	19.286	116.665
31	18	Dale Jarrett	Joe Gibbs Racing	Chevrolet	19.311	116.514
32	78	Jay Hedgecock	Triad Motorsports	Ford	19.318	116.472
33	17	Darrell Waltrip	Darrell Waltrip Motorsports	Chevrolet	19.339	116.345
34	32	Dick Trickle	Active Motorsports	Chevrolet	19.379	116.105
Provisionals
35	8	Jeff Burton (R)	Stavola Brothers Racing	Ford	-*	-*
36	22	Bobby Labonte	Bill Davis Racing	Pontiac	-*	-*
Failed to qualify
37	29	Steve Grissom (R)	Diamond Ridge Motorsports	Chevrolet	-*	-*
38	31	Ward Burton (R)	A.G. Dillard Motorsports	Chevrolet	-*	-*
39	9	Rich Bickle	Melling Racing	Ford	-*	-*
40	41	Joe Nemechek (R)	Larry Hedrick Motorsports	Chevrolet	-*	-*
41	19	Loy Allen Jr. (R)	TriStar Motorsports	Ford	-*	-*
42	55	Jimmy Hensley	RaDiUs Motorsports	Ford	-*	-*
43	90	Mike Wallace (R)	Donlavey Racing	Ford	-*	-*
44	02	Curtis Markham	Taylor Racing	Ford	-*	-*
45	52	Mike Skinner	Jimmy Means Racing	Ford	-*	-*
46	62	Freddie Query	Gray Racing	Ford	-*	-*
Official first round qualifying results
Official starting lineup

== Race results ==
Fin	St	#	Driver	Team	Make	Laps	Led	Status	Pts	Winnings
1	10	5	Terry Labonte	Hendrick Motorsports	Chevrolet	400	29	running	180	$61,640
2	16	2	Rusty Wallace	Penske Racing South	Ford	400	38	running	175	$42,215
3	1	28	Ernie Irvan	Robert Yates Racing	Ford	400	320	running	175	$41,565
4	28	42	Kyle Petty	SABCO Racing	Pontiac	400	0	running	160	$32,165
5	19	3	Dale Earnhardt	Richard Childress Racing	Chevrolet	400	0	running	155	$26,740
6	25	10	Ricky Rudd	Rudd Performance Motorsports	Ford	400	5	running	155	$8,390
7	5	7	Geoff Bodine	Geoff Bodine Racing	Ford	399	0	running	146	$16,565
8	30	33	Harry Gant	Leo Jackson Motorsports	Chevrolet	399	0	running	142	$16,850
9	9	25	Ken Schrader	Hendrick Motorsports	Chevrolet	398	6	running	143	$15,025
10	17	1	Rick Mast	Precision Products Racing	Ford	397	0	running	134	$16,130
11	18	30	Michael Waltrip	Bahari Racing	Pontiac	397	0	running	130	$13,525
12	29	15	Lake Speed	Bud Moore Engineering	Ford	397	0	running	127	$15,975
13	13	6	Mark Martin	Roush Racing	Ford	397	0	running	124	$17,650
14	24	40	Bobby Hamilton	SABCO Racing	Pontiac	397	2	running	126	$12,875
15	12	24	Jeff Gordon	Hendrick Motorsports	Chevrolet	396	0	running	118	$13,100
16	27	43	Wally Dallenbach Jr.	Petty Enterprises	Pontiac	396	0	running	115	$8,475
17	7	4	Sterling Marlin	Morgan–McClure Motorsports	Chevrolet	396	0	running	112	$15,425
18	4	11	Bill Elliott	Junior Johnson & Associates	Ford	395	0	running	109	$12,175
19	26	75	Todd Bodine	Butch Mock Motorsports	Ford	395	0	running	106	$8,025
20	14	23	Hut Stricklin	Travis Carter Enterprises	Ford	395	0	running	103	$5,950
21	3	16	Ted Musgrave	Roush Racing	Ford	395	0	running	100	$11,800
22	15	21	Morgan Shepherd	Wood Brothers Racing	Ford	395	0	running	97	$15,150
23	2	26	Brett Bodine	King Racing	Ford	395	0	running	94	$11,525
24	34	32	Dick Trickle	Active Motorsports	Chevrolet	394	0	running	91	$5,000
25	31	18	Dale Jarrett	Joe Gibbs Racing	Chevrolet	394	0	running	88	$16,275
26	36	22	Bobby Labonte	Bill Davis Racing	Pontiac	394	0	running	85	$11,225
27	22	98	Derrike Cope	Cale Yarborough Motorsports	Ford	393	0	running	82	$7,050
28	33	17	Darrell Waltrip	Darrell Waltrip Motorsports	Chevrolet	390	0	running	79	$10,985
29	20	71	Dave Marcis	Marcis Auto Racing	Chevrolet	388	0	running	76	$6,800
30	11	95	Jeremy Mayfield (R)	Sadler Brothers Racing	Ford	388	0	running	73	$5,325
31	23	14	John Andretti (R)	Hagan Racing	Chevrolet	386	0	running	70	$10,750
32	8	27	Jimmy Spencer	Junior Johnson & Associates	Ford	353	0	running	67	$6,225
33	35	8	Jeff Burton (R)	Stavola Brothers Racing	Ford	352	0	handling	64	$9,700
34	6	77	Greg Sacks	U.S. Motorsports Inc.	Ford	352	0	running	61	$4,225
35	21	12	Chuck Bown	Bobby Allison Motorsports	Ford	274	0	engine	58	$8,200
36	32	78	Jay Hedgecock	Triad Motorsports	Ford	53	0	rear end	55	$4,700
Official race results

== Standings after the race ==
Drivers' Championship standings

	Pos	Driver	Points
	1	Dale Earnhardt	1,119
	2	Ernie Irvan	1,099 (-20)
	3	Mark Martin	1,008 (-111)
	4	Ken Schrader	981 (–138)
	5	Lake Speed	939 (–180)
4	6	Rusty Wallace	886 (–233)
5	7	Terry Labonte	880 (–239)
	8	Ricky Rudd	879 (–240)
3	9	Sterling Marlin	869 (–250)
1	10	Kyle Petty	865 (–254)
Official driver's standings

- Note: Only the first 10 positions are included for the driver standings.

Previous race: 1994 Food City 500	NASCAR Winston Cup Series; 1994 season	Next race: 1994 Hanes 500
