= 1994 Hanes 500 =

Eighth race of the 1994 NASCAR Winston Cup Series

Race details
- Race 8 of 31 in the 1994 NASCAR Winston Cup Series
- The 1994 Hanes 500 program cover, featuring Rusty Wallace.
- Date: April 24, 1994
- Official name: 45th Annual Hanes 500
- Location: Martinsville, Virginia, Martinsville Speedway
- Course: Permanent racing facility
- Course length: 0.526 miles (0.847 km)
- Distance: 356 laps, 187.256 mi (301.359 km)
- Scheduled distance: 500 laps, 263 mi (423.257 km)
- Average speed: 76.7 miles per hour (123.4 km/h)
- Attendance: 59,000

Pole position
Driver	Rusty Wallace	Penske Racing South
- Time: 20.374

Most laps led
Driver	Rusty Wallace	Penske Racing South
- Laps: 317

Winner
No. 2	Rusty Wallace	Penske Racing South

Television in the United States
- Network: ESPN
- Announcers: Bob Jenkins, Ned Jarrett, Benny Parsons

Radio in the United States
- Radio: Motor Racing Network

The 1994 Hanes 500 was the eighth stock car race of the 1994 NASCAR Winston Cup Series season and the 45th iteration of the event. The race was held on Sunday, April 24, 1994, in Martinsville, Virginia at Martinsville Speedway, a 0.526 miles (0.847 km) permanent oval-shaped short track. The race took the scheduled 500 laps to complete. In the final laps of the race, Penske Racing South driver Rusty Wallace would be able to defend Robert Yates Racing driver Ernie Irvan to complete a comeback from a speeding penalty midway through the race, retaking the lead on lap 433. The race was Wallace's 33rd career NASCAR Winston Cup Series victory and his second victory of the season. To fill out the top three, the aforementioned Ernie Irvan and Roush Racing driver Mark Martin would finish second and third, respectively. With his second-place finish, Irvan was able to regain the overall points lead in the driver's championship from Dale Earnhardt.

== Background ==
The layout of Martinsville Speedway, the venue where the race was held.

Martinsville Speedway is a NASCAR-owned stock car racing track located in Henry County, in Ridgeway, Virginia, just to the south of Martinsville. At 0.526 miles (0.847 km) in length, it is the shortest track in the NASCAR Cup Series. The track was also one of the first paved oval tracks in NASCAR, being built in 1947 by H. Clay Earles. It is also the only remaining race track that has been on the NASCAR circuit from its beginning in 1948.

=== Entry list ===
- (R) denotes rookie driver.

#	Driver	Team	Make
1	Rick Mast	Precision Products Racing	Ford
2	Rusty Wallace	Penske Racing South	Ford
02	Curtis Markham	Taylor Racing	Ford
3	Dale Earnhardt	Richard Childress Racing	Chevrolet
4	Sterling Marlin	Morgan–McClure Motorsports	Chevrolet
5	Terry Labonte	Hendrick Motorsports	Chevrolet
6	Mark Martin	Roush Racing	Ford
7	Geoff Bodine	Geoff Bodine Racing	Ford
8	Jeff Burton (R)	Stavola Brothers Racing	Ford
10	Ricky Rudd	Rudd Performance Motorsports	Ford
11	Bill Elliott	Junior Johnson & Associates	Ford
12	Chuck Bown	Bobby Allison Motorsports	Ford
14	John Andretti (R)	Hagan Racing	Chevrolet
15	Lake Speed	Bud Moore Engineering	Ford
16	Ted Musgrave	Roush Racing	Ford
17	Darrell Waltrip	Darrell Waltrip Motorsports	Chevrolet
18	Dale Jarrett	Joe Gibbs Racing	Chevrolet
19	Loy Allen Jr. (R)	TriStar Motorsports	Ford
21	Morgan Shepherd	Wood Brothers Racing	Ford
22	Bobby Labonte	Bill Davis Racing	Pontiac
23	Hut Stricklin	Travis Carter Enterprises	Ford
24	Jeff Gordon	Hendrick Motorsports	Chevrolet
25	Ken Schrader	Hendrick Motorsports	Chevrolet
26	Brett Bodine	King Racing	Ford
27	Jimmy Spencer	Junior Johnson & Associates	Ford
28	Ernie Irvan	Robert Yates Racing	Ford
29	Steve Grissom	Diamond Ridge Motorsports	Chevrolet
30	Michael Waltrip	Bahari Racing	Pontiac
31	Ward Burton	A.G. Dillard Motorsports	Chevrolet
32	Dick Trickle	Active Motorsports	Chevrolet
33	Harry Gant	Leo Jackson Motorsports	Chevrolet
40	Bobby Hamilton	SABCO Racing	Pontiac
41	Joe Nemechek (R)	Larry Hedrick Motorsports	Chevrolet
42	Kyle Petty	SABCO Racing	Pontiac
43	Wally Dallenbach Jr.	Petty Enterprises	Pontiac
52	Mike Skinner	Jimmy Means Racing	Ford
55	Jimmy Hensley	RaDiUs Motorsports	Ford
63	Jim Bown	Kieper Racing	Chevrolet
71	Dave Marcis	Marcis Auto Racing	Chevrolet
75	Todd Bodine	Butch Mock Motorsports	Ford
77	Greg Sacks	U.S. Motorsports Inc.	Ford
78	Jay Hedgecock	Triad Motorsports	Ford
90	Mike Wallace (R)	Donlavey Racing	Ford
98	Derrike Cope	Cale Yarborough Motorsports	Ford

== Qualifying ==
Qualifying was split into two rounds. The first round was held on Friday, April 22, at 3:00 PM EST. Each driver would have one lap to set a time. During the first round, the top 20 drivers in the round would be guaranteed a starting spot in the race. If a driver was not able to guarantee a spot in the first round, they had the option to scrub their time from the first round and try and run a faster lap time in a second round qualifying run, held on Saturday, April 23, at 12:30 PM EST. As with the first round, each driver would have one lap to set a time. For this specific race, positions 21-34 would be decided on time, and depending on who needed it, a select amount of positions were given to cars who had not otherwise qualified but were high enough in owner's points; which was usually two. If needed, a past champion who did not qualify on either time or provisionals could use a champion's provisional, adding one more spot to the field.

Rusty Wallace, driving for Penske Racing South, won the pole, setting a time of 20.374 and an average speed of 92.942 mph (149.576 km/h) in the first round.

Eight drivers would fail to qualify.

=== Full qualifying results ===
Pos.	#	Driver	Team	Make	Time	Speed
1	2	Rusty Wallace	Penske Racing South	Ford	20.374	92.942
2	4	Sterling Marlin	Morgan–McClure Motorsports	Chevrolet	20.401	92.819
3	7	Geoff Bodine	Geoff Bodine Racing	Ford	20.426	92.705
4	27	Jimmy Spencer	Junior Johnson & Associates	Ford	20.463	92.538
5	28	Ernie Irvan	Robert Yates Racing	Ford	20.471	92.502
6	6	Mark Martin	Roush Racing	Ford	20.501	92.366
7	30	Michael Waltrip	Bahari Racing	Pontiac	20.508	92.335
8	3	Dale Earnhardt	Richard Childress Racing	Chevrolet	20.512	92.317
9	42	Kyle Petty	SABCO Racing	Pontiac	20.514	92.308
10	11	Bill Elliott	Junior Johnson & Associates	Ford	20.515	92.303
11	1	Rick Mast	Precision Products Racing	Ford	20.563	92.088
12	75	Todd Bodine	Butch Mock Motorsports	Ford	20.571	92.052
13	24	Jeff Gordon	Hendrick Motorsports	Chevrolet	20.587	91.980
14	98	Derrike Cope	Cale Yarborough Motorsports	Ford	20.592	91.958
15	40	Bobby Hamilton	SABCO Racing	Pontiac	20.602	91.913
16	17	Darrell Waltrip	Darrell Waltrip Motorsports	Chevrolet	20.608	91.887
17	25	Ken Schrader	Hendrick Motorsports	Chevrolet	20.610	91.878
18	77	Greg Sacks	U.S. Motorsports Inc.	Ford	20.633	91.775
19	10	Ricky Rudd	Rudd Performance Motorsports	Ford	20.658	91.664
20	18	Dale Jarrett	Joe Gibbs Racing	Chevrolet	20.662	91.647
Failed to lock in Round 1
21	8	Jeff Burton (R)	Stavola Brothers Racing	Ford	20.613	91.864
22	22	Bobby Labonte	Bill Davis Racing	Pontiac	20.675	91.589
23	29	Steve Grissom	Diamond Ridge Motorsports	Chevrolet	20.676	91.584
24	55	Jimmy Hensley	RaDiUs Motorsports	Ford	20.686	91.540
25	15	Lake Speed	Bud Moore Engineering	Ford	20.704	91.461
26	23	Hut Stricklin	Travis Carter Enterprises	Ford	20.739	91.306
27	14	John Andretti (R)	Hagan Racing	Chevrolet	20.748	91.267
28	16	Ted Musgrave	Roush Racing	Ford	20.754	91.240
29	41	Joe Nemechek (R)	Larry Hedrick Motorsports	Chevrolet	20.761	91.209
30	5	Terry Labonte	Hendrick Motorsports	Chevrolet	20.779	91.130
31	78	Jay Hedgecock	Triad Motorsports	Ford	20.832	90.899
32	21	Morgan Shepherd	Wood Brothers Racing	Ford	20.847	90.833
33	31	Ward Burton (R)	A.G. Dillard Motorsports	Chevrolet	20.848	90.829
34	32	Dick Trickle	Active Motorsports	Chevrolet	20.858	90.785
Provisionals
35	26	Brett Bodine	King Racing	Ford	-*	-*
36	12	Chuck Bown	Bobby Allison Motorsports	Ford	-*	-*
Failed to qualify
37	43	Wally Dallenbach Jr.	Petty Enterprises	Pontiac	-*	-*
38	90	Mike Wallace (R)	Donlavey Racing	Ford	-*	-*
39	71	Dave Marcis	Marcis Auto Racing	Chevrolet	-*	-*
40	19	Loy Allen Jr. (R)	TriStar Motorsports	Ford	-*	-*
41	02	Curtis Markham	Taylor Racing	Ford	-*	-*
42	63	Jim Bown	Kieper Racing	Chevrolet	-*	-*
43	52	Mike Skinner	Jimmy Means Racing	Ford	-*	-*
44	33	Harry Gant	Leo Jackson Motorsports	Chevrolet	-*	-*
Official first round qualifying results
Official starting lineup

== Race results ==
Fin	St	#	Driver	Team	Make	Laps	Led	Status	Pts	Winnings
1	1	2	Rusty Wallace	Penske Racing South	Ford	500	317	running	185	$173,675
2	5	28	Ernie Irvan	Robert Yates Racing	Ford	500	76	running	175	$41,750
3	6	6	Mark Martin	Roush Racing	Ford	500	27	running	170	$33,425
4	16	17	Darrell Waltrip	Darrell Waltrip Motorsports	Chevrolet	500	9	running	165	$23,050
5	32	21	Morgan Shepherd	Wood Brothers Racing	Ford	500	0	running	155	$23,875
6	12	75	Todd Bodine	Butch Mock Motorsports	Ford	500	0	running	150	$14,775
7	36	12	Chuck Bown	Bobby Allison Motorsports	Ford	500	0	running	146	$24,575
8	11	1	Rick Mast	Precision Products Racing	Ford	499	0	running	142	$16,875
9	10	11	Bill Elliott	Junior Johnson & Associates	Ford	499	0	running	138	$16,175
10	28	16	Ted Musgrave	Roush Racing	Ford	499	0	running	134	$17,725
11	8	3	Dale Earnhardt	Richard Childress Racing	Chevrolet	499	0	running	130	$21,060
12	19	10	Ricky Rudd	Rudd Performance Motorsports	Ford	498	0	running	127	$6,825
13	15	40	Bobby Hamilton	SABCO Racing	Pontiac	498	0	running	124	$13,725
14	23	29	Steve Grissom	Diamond Ridge Motorsports	Chevrolet	497	0	running	121	$7,525
15	30	5	Terry Labonte	Hendrick Motorsports	Chevrolet	497	0	running	118	$16,675
16	33	31	Ward Burton (R)	A.G. Dillard Motorsports	Chevrolet	497	0	running	115	$6,825
17	7	30	Michael Waltrip	Bahari Racing	Pontiac	496	0	running	112	$13,225
18	4	27	Jimmy Spencer	Junior Johnson & Associates	Ford	495	0	running	109	$8,630
19	22	22	Bobby Labonte	Bill Davis Racing	Pontiac	495	0	running	106	$11,975
20	26	23	Hut Stricklin	Travis Carter Enterprises	Ford	495	0	running	103	$5,825
21	20	18	Dale Jarrett	Joe Gibbs Racing	Chevrolet	494	0	running	100	$16,475
22	29	41	Joe Nemechek (R)	Larry Hedrick Motorsports	Chevrolet	493	0	running	97	$7,575
23	24	55	Jimmy Hensley	RaDiUs Motorsports	Ford	493	0	running	94	$7,425
24	35	26	Brett Bodine	King Racing	Ford	489	0	running	91	$11,275
25	31	78	Jay Hedgecock	Triad Motorsports	Ford	484	0	running	88	$4,775
26	9	42	Kyle Petty	SABCO Racing	Pontiac	483	0	running	85	$15,675
27	2	4	Sterling Marlin	Morgan–McClure Motorsports	Chevrolet	474	0	running	82	$16,625
28	14	98	Derrike Cope	Cale Yarborough Motorsports	Ford	473	0	rear end	79	$6,825
29	18	77	Greg Sacks	U.S. Motorsports Inc.	Ford	472	0	running	76	$4,425
30	25	15	Lake Speed	Bud Moore Engineering	Ford	467	0	running	73	$14,375
31	17	25	Ken Schrader	Hendrick Motorsports	Chevrolet	438	0	running	70	$10,575
32	34	32	Dick Trickle	Active Motorsports	Chevrolet	400	0	running	67	$4,375
33	13	24	Jeff Gordon	Hendrick Motorsports	Chevrolet	394	0	running	64	$10,475
34	3	7	Geoff Bodine	Geoff Bodine Racing	Ford	385	71	crash	66	$12,375
35	27	14	John Andretti (R)	Hagan Racing	Chevrolet	351	0	engine	58	$10,375
36	21	8	Jeff Burton (R)	Stavola Brothers Racing	Ford	286	0	clutch	55	$10,875
Official race results

== Standings after the race ==
Drivers' Championship standings

	Pos	Driver	Points
1	1	Ernie Irvan	1,274
1	2	Dale Earnhardt	1,249 (-25)
	3	Mark Martin	1,178 (-96)
3	4	Rusty Wallace	1,071 (–203)
1	5	Ken Schrader	1,051 (–223)
1	6	Lake Speed	1,012 (–262)
1	7	Ricky Rudd	1,006 (–268)
3	8	Morgan Shepherd	1,001 (–273)
2	9	Terry Labonte	998 (–276)
1	10	Sterling Marlin	951 (–323)
Official driver's standings

- Note: Only the first 10 positions are included for the driver standings.

Previous race: 1994 First Union 400	NASCAR Winston Cup Series; 1994 season	Next race: 1994 Winston Select 500
