= 1995 Hanes 500 =

Eighth race of the 1995 NASCAR Winston Cup Series

Race details
- Race 8 of 31 in the 1995 NASCAR Winston Cup Series
- The 1995 Hanes 500 program cover
- Date: April 23, 1995
- Official name: 46th Annual Hanes 500
- Location: Martinsville, Virginia, Martinsville Speedway
- Course: Permanent racing facility
- Course length: 0.526 miles (0.847 km)
- Distance: 356 laps, 187.256 mi (301.359 km)
- Scheduled distance: 500 laps, 263 mi (423.257 km)
- Average speed: 72.145 miles per hour (116.106 km/h)

Pole position
Driver	Bobby Labonte	Joe Gibbs Racing
- Time: 20.294

Most laps led
Driver	Rusty Wallace	Penske Racing South
- Laps: 175

Winner
No. 2	Rusty Wallace	Penske Racing South

Television in the United States
- Network: ESPN
- Announcers: Bob Jenkins, Ned Jarrett, Benny Parsons

Radio in the United States
- Radio: Motor Racing Network

The 1995 Hanes 500 was the eighth stock car race of the 1995 NASCAR Winston Cup Series and the 39th iteration of the event. The race was held on Sunday, April 23, 1995, in Martinsville, Virginia at Martinsville Speedway, a 0.526 miles (0.847 km) permanent oval-shaped short track. The race was shortened from its scheduled 500 laps to 356 laps due to impending darkness. At race's end, Penske Racing South driver Rusty Wallace was able to dominate the majority of the race when the race was called for darkness with delays of the race coming from a rain delay. The win was Wallace's 40th career NASCAR Winston Cup Series victory and his first victory of the season. To fill out the top three, Roush Racing driver Ted Musgrave and Hendrick Motorsports driver Jeff Gordon would finish second and third, respectively.

== Background ==
The layout of Martinsville Speedway, the venue where the race was held

Martinsville Speedway is a NASCAR-owned stock car racing track located in Henry County, in Ridgeway, Virginia, just south of Martinsville. At 0.526 miles (0.847 km) in length, it is the shortest track in the NASCAR Cup Series. It was also one of the first paved oval tracks in NASCAR, being built in 1947 by H. Clay Earles. It is also the only remaining race track that has been on the NASCAR circuit from its beginning in 1948.

=== Entry list ===
- (R) denotes rookie driver.

#	Driver	Team	Make
1	Rick Mast	Precision Products Racing	Pontiac
2	Rusty Wallace	Penske Racing South	Ford
3	Dale Earnhardt	Richard Childress Racing	Chevrolet
4	Sterling Marlin	Morgan–McClure Motorsports	Chevrolet
5	Terry Labonte	Hendrick Motorsports	Chevrolet
6	Mark Martin	Roush Racing	Ford
7	Geoff Bodine	Geoff Bodine Racing	Ford
8	Jeff Burton	Stavola Brothers Racing	Ford
9	Lake Speed	Melling Racing	Ford
10	Ricky Rudd	Rudd Performance Motorsports	Ford
11	Brett Bodine	Brett Bodine Racing	Ford
12	Derrike Cope	Bobby Allison Motorsports	Ford
15	Dick Trickle	Bud Moore Engineering	Ford
16	Ted Musgrave	Roush Racing	Ford
17	Darrell Waltrip	Darrell Waltrip Motorsports	Chevrolet
18	Bobby Labonte	Joe Gibbs Racing	Chevrolet
21	Morgan Shepherd	Wood Brothers Racing	Ford
22	Randy LaJoie (R)	Bill Davis Racing	Pontiac
23	Jimmy Spencer	Haas-Carter Motorsports	Ford
24	Jeff Gordon	Hendrick Motorsports	Chevrolet
25	Ken Schrader	Hendrick Motorsports	Chevrolet
26	Hut Stricklin	King Racing	Ford
27	Elton Sawyer	Junior Johnson & Associates	Ford
28	Dale Jarrett	Robert Yates Racing	Ford
29	Steve Grissom	Diamond Ridge Motorsports	Chevrolet
30	Michael Waltrip	Bahari Racing	Pontiac
31	Ward Burton	A.G. Dillard Motorsports	Chevrolet
32	Chuck Bown	Active Motorsports	Chevrolet
33	Robert Pressley (R)	Leo Jackson Motorsports	Chevrolet
37	John Andretti	Kranefuss-Haas Racing	Ford
40	Greg Sacks	Dick Brooks Racing	Pontiac
41	Ricky Craven (R)	Larry Hedrick Motorsports	Chevrolet
42	Kyle Petty	Team SABCO	Pontiac
43	Bobby Hamilton	Petty Enterprises	Pontiac
71	Dave Marcis	Marcis Auto Racing	Chevrolet
75	Todd Bodine	Butch Mock Motorsports	Ford
77	Davy Jones (R)	Jasper Motorsports	Ford
78	Jay Hedgecock	Triad Motorsports	Ford
81	Kenny Wallace	FILMAR Racing	Ford
87	Joe Nemechek	NEMCO Motorsports	Chevrolet
90	Mike Wallace	Donlavey Racing	Ford
94	Bill Elliott	Elliott-Hardy Racing	Ford
98	Jeremy Mayfield	Cale Yarborough Motorsports	Ford

== Qualifying ==
Qualifying was split into two rounds. The first round was held on Friday, April 21, at 3:00 PM EST. Each driver would have one lap to set a time. During the first round, the top 20 drivers in the round would be guaranteed a starting spot in the race. If a driver was not able to guarantee a spot in the first round, they had the option to scrub their time from the first round and try and run a faster lap time in a second round qualifying run, held on Saturday, April 22, at 12:15 PM EST. As with the first round, each driver would have one lap to set a time. For this specific race, positions 21-32 would be decided on time, and depending on who needed it, a select amount of positions were given to cars who had not otherwise qualified but were high enough in owner's points; which was usually four. If needed, a past champion who did not qualify on either time or provisionals could use a champion's provisional, adding one more spot to the field.

Bobby Labonte, driving for Joe Gibbs Racing, won the pole, setting a time of 20.294 and an average speed of 93.308 mph (150.165 km/h) in the first round.

Seven drivers would fail to qualify.

=== Full qualifying results ===
Pos.	#	Driver	Team	Make	Time	Speed
1	18	Bobby Labonte	Joe Gibbs Racing	Chevrolet	20.294	93.308
2	33	Robert Pressley (R)	Leo Jackson Motorsports	Chevrolet	20.309	93.239
3	40	Greg Sacks	Dick Brooks Racing	Pontiac	20.309	93.239
4	17	Darrell Waltrip	Darrell Waltrip Motorsports	Chevrolet	20.313	93.221
5	6	Mark Martin	Roush Racing	Ford	20.319	93.194
6	43	Bobby Hamilton	Petty Enterprises	Pontiac	20.336	93.116
7	42	Kyle Petty	Team SABCO	Pontiac	20.345	93.074
8	10	Ricky Rudd	Rudd Performance Motorsports	Ford	20.376	92.933
9	27	Elton Sawyer	Junior Johnson & Associates	Ford	20.380	92.915
10	28	Dale Jarrett	Robert Yates Racing	Ford	20.387	92.883
11	11	Brett Bodine	Brett Bodine Racing	Ford	20.391	92.864
12	24	Jeff Gordon	Hendrick Motorsports	Chevrolet	20.400	92.824
13	25	Ken Schrader	Hendrick Motorsports	Chevrolet	20.428	92.696
14	94	Bill Elliott	Elliott-Hardy Racing	Ford	20.433	92.674
15	2	Rusty Wallace	Penske Racing South	Ford	20.464	92.533
16	5	Terry Labonte	Hendrick Motorsports	Chevrolet	20.467	92.520
17	4	Sterling Marlin	Morgan–McClure Motorsports	Chevrolet	20.471	92.502
18	21	Morgan Shepherd	Wood Brothers Racing	Ford	20.478	92.470
19	98	Jeremy Mayfield	Cale Yarborough Motorsports	Ford	20.495	92.393
20	3	Dale Earnhardt	Richard Childress Racing	Chevrolet	20.507	92.339
21	15	Dick Trickle	Bud Moore Engineering	Ford	20.405	92.801
22	1	Rick Mast	Precision Products Racing	Ford	20.413	92.764
23	71	Dave Marcis	Marcis Auto Racing	Chevrolet	20.429	92.692
24	9	Lake Speed	Melling Racing	Ford	20.512	92.317
25	41	Ricky Craven (R)	Larry Hedrick Motorsports	Chevrolet	20.537	92.204
26	29	Steve Grissom	Diamond Ridge Motorsports	Chevrolet	20.542	92.182
27	26	Hut Stricklin	King Racing	Ford	20.544	92.173
28	81	Kenny Wallace	FILMAR Racing	Ford	20.545	92.168
29	31	Ward Burton	A.G. Dillard Motorsports	Chevrolet	20.546	92.164
30	87	Joe Nemechek	NEMCO Motorsports	Chevrolet	20.549	92.150
31	90	Mike Wallace	Donlavey Racing	Ford	20.555	92.124
32	16	Ted Musgrave	Roush Racing	Ford	20.560	92.101
Provisionals
33	12	Derrike Cope	Bobby Allison Motorsports	Ford	-*	-*
34	37	John Andretti	Kranefuss-Haas Racing	Ford	-*	-*
35	30	Michael Waltrip	Bahari Racing	Pontiac	-*	-*
36	7	Geoff Bodine	Geoff Bodine Racing	Ford	-*	-*
Failed to qualify
37	75	Todd Bodine	Butch Mock Motorsports	Ford	-*	-*
38	23	Jimmy Spencer	Travis Carter Enterprises	Ford	-*	-*
39	22	Randy LaJoie (R)	Bill Davis Racing	Pontiac	-*	-*
40	32	Chuck Bown	Active Motorsports	Chevrolet	-*	-*
41	78	Jay Hedgecock	Triad Motorsports	Ford	-*	-*
42	8	Jeff Burton	Stavola Brothers Racing	Ford	-*	-*
43	77	Davy Jones (R)	Jasper Motorsports	Ford	-*	-*
Official first round qualifying results
Official starting lineup

== Race results ==
Fin	St	#	Driver	Team	Make	Laps	Led	Status	Pts	Winnings
1	15	2	Rusty Wallace	Penske Racing South	Ford	356	175	running	185	$61,945
2	32	16	Ted Musgrave	Roush Racing	Ford	356	1	running	175	$46,295
3	12	24	Jeff Gordon	Hendrick Motorsports	Chevrolet	356	9	running	170	$37,895
4	4	17	Darrell Waltrip	Darrell Waltrip Motorsports	Chevrolet	356	146	running	165	$42,695
5	5	6	Mark Martin	Roush Racing	Ford	356	0	running	155	$33,195
6	13	25	Ken Schrader	Hendrick Motorsports	Chevrolet	356	0	running	150	$27,295
7	10	28	Dale Jarrett	Robert Yates Racing	Ford	356	0	running	146	$26,595
8	6	43	Bobby Hamilton	Petty Enterprises	Pontiac	356	0	running	142	$15,985
9	7	42	Kyle Petty	Team SABCO	Pontiac	355	0	running	138	$20,285
10	1	18	Bobby Labonte	Joe Gibbs Racing	Chevrolet	355	0	running	134	$27,135
11	11	11	Brett Bodine	Brett Bodine Racing	Ford	355	0	running	130	$22,420
12	14	94	Bill Elliott	Elliott-Hardy Racing	Ford	355	0	running	127	$8,935
13	17	4	Sterling Marlin	Morgan–McClure Motorsports	Chevrolet	355	0	running	124	$21,715
14	30	87	Joe Nemechek	NEMCO Motorsports	Chevrolet	355	0	running	121	$8,615
15	35	30	Michael Waltrip	Bahari Racing	Pontiac	355	0	running	118	$18,215
16	19	98	Jeremy Mayfield	Cale Yarborough Motorsports	Ford	355	0	running	115	$12,415
17	2	33	Robert Pressley (R)	Leo Jackson Motorsports	Chevrolet	355	25	running	117	$20,115
18	25	41	Ricky Craven (R)	Larry Hedrick Motorsports	Chevrolet	355	0	running	109	$12,120
19	26	29	Steve Grissom	Diamond Ridge Motorsports	Chevrolet	354	0	running	106	$10,965
20	9	27	Elton Sawyer	Junior Johnson & Associates	Ford	354	0	running	103	$16,515
21	28	81	Kenny Wallace	FILMAR Racing	Ford	353	0	running	100	$7,165
22	3	40	Greg Sacks	Dick Brooks Racing	Pontiac	353	0	running	97	$16,565
23	23	71	Dave Marcis	Marcis Auto Racing	Chevrolet	353	0	running	94	$7,015
24	21	15	Dick Trickle	Bud Moore Engineering	Ford	353	0	running	91	$15,865
25	29	31	Ward Burton	A.G. Dillard Motorsports	Chevrolet	352	0	running	88	$6,865
26	24	9	Lake Speed	Melling Racing	Ford	351	0	running	85	$6,765
27	31	90	Mike Wallace	Donlavey Racing	Ford	351	0	accident	82	$15,015
28	33	12	Derrike Cope	Bobby Allison Motorsports	Ford	350	0	running	79	$9,815
29	20	3	Dale Earnhardt	Richard Childress Racing	Chevrolet	331	0	running	76	$27,515
30	8	10	Ricky Rudd	Rudd Performance Motorsports	Ford	313	0	transmission	73	$19,465
31	18	21	Morgan Shepherd	Wood Brothers Racing	Ford	309	0	running	70	$14,565
32	34	37	John Andretti	Kranefuss-Haas Racing	Ford	306	0	running	67	$6,465
33	27	26	Hut Stricklin	King Racing	Ford	271	0	running	64	$14,465
34	22	1	Rick Mast	Precision Products Racing	Ford	236	0	running	61	$15,365
35	36	7	Geoff Bodine	Geoff Bodine Racing	Ford	55	0	engine	58	$21,065
36	16	5	Terry Labonte	Hendrick Motorsports	Chevrolet	4	0	accident	55	$21,265
Official race results

Previous race: 1995 First Union 400	NASCAR Winston Cup Series; 1995 season	Next race: 1995 Winston Select 500
