= 1995 First Union 400 =

Seventh race of the 1995 NASCAR Winston Cup Series

Race details
- Race 7 of 31 in the 1995 NASCAR Winston Cup Series
- The 1995 First Union 400 program cover, featuring Terry Labonte.
- Date: April 9, 1995
- Official name: 45th Annual First Union 400
- Location: North Wilkesboro Speedway, North Wilkesboro, North Carolina
- Course: Permanent racing facility
- Course length: 0.625 miles (1.006 km)
- Distance: 400 laps, 250 mi (402.336 km)
- Scheduled distance: 400 laps, 250 mi (402.336 km)
- Average speed: 102.424 miles per hour (164.835 km/h)
- Attendance: 56,000

Pole position
| Driver | Jeff Gordon | Hendrick Motorsports |
- Time: 18.945

Most laps led
| Driver | Dale Earnhardt | Richard Childress Racing |
- Laps: 227

Winner
| No. 3 | Dale Earnhardt | Richard Childress Racing |

Television in the United States
- Network: ESPN
- Announcers: Bob Jenkins, Ned Jarrett, Benny Parsons

Radio in the United States
- Radio: Motor Racing Network

The 1995 First Union 400 was the seventh stock car race of the 1995 NASCAR Winston Cup Series and the 45th iteration of the event. The race was held on Sunday, April 9, 1995, in North Wilkesboro, North Carolina at the North Wilkesboro Speedway, a 0.625 miles (1.006 km) oval short track. The race took the scheduled 400 laps to complete. At race's end, Richard Childress Racing driver Dale Earnhardt would manage to dominate a majority of the race to take his 64th career NASCAR Winston Cup Series victory and his first victory of the season. To fill out the top three, Hendrick Motorsports driver Jeff Gordon and Roush Racing driver Mark Martin would finish second and third, respectively.

== Background ==
The layout of North Wilkesboro Speedway, the venue where the race was held.

North Wilkesboro Speedway is a short oval racetrack located on U.S. Route 421, about five miles east of the town of North Wilkesboro, North Carolina, or 80 miles north of Charlotte. It measures 0.625 mi (1.006 km) and features a unique uphill backstretch and downhill frontstretch. It has previously held races in NASCAR's top three series, including 93 Winston Cup Series races. The track, a NASCAR original, operated from 1949, NASCAR's inception, until the track's original closure in 1996. The speedway briefly reopened in 2010 and hosted several stock car series races before closing again in the spring of 2011. It was re-opened in August 2022 for grassroots racing.

=== Entry list ===
- (R) denotes rookie driver.

| # | Driver | Team | Make |
|---|---|---|---|
| 1 | Rick Mast | Precision Products Racing | Pontiac |
| 2 | Rusty Wallace | Penske Racing South | Ford |
| 3 | Dale Earnhardt | Richard Childress Racing | Chevrolet |
| 4 | Sterling Marlin | Morgan–McClure Motorsports | Chevrolet |
| 5 | Terry Labonte | Hendrick Motorsports | Chevrolet |
| 6 | Mark Martin | Roush Racing | Ford |
| 7 | Geoff Bodine | Geoff Bodine Racing | Ford |
| 8 | Jeff Burton | Stavola Brothers Racing | Ford |
| 9 | Lake Speed | Melling Racing | Ford |
| 10 | Ricky Rudd | Rudd Performance Motorsports | Ford |
| 11 | Brett Bodine | Brett Bodine Racing | Ford |
| 12 | Derrike Cope | Bobby Allison Motorsports | Ford |
| 15 | Dick Trickle | Bud Moore Engineering | Ford |
| 16 | Ted Musgrave | Roush Racing | Ford |
| 17 | Darrell Waltrip | Darrell Waltrip Motorsports | Chevrolet |
| 18 | Bobby Labonte | Joe Gibbs Racing | Chevrolet |
| 21 | Morgan Shepherd | Wood Brothers Racing | Ford |
| 22 | Randy LaJoie (R) | Bill Davis Racing | Pontiac |
| 23 | Jimmy Spencer | Haas-Carter Motorsports | Ford |
| 24 | Jeff Gordon | Hendrick Motorsports | Chevrolet |
| 25 | Ken Schrader | Hendrick Motorsports | Chevrolet |
| 26 | Steve Kinser | King Racing | Ford |
| 27 | Jeff Purvis | Junior Johnson & Associates | Ford |
| 28 | Dale Jarrett | Robert Yates Racing | Ford |
| 29 | Steve Grissom | Diamond Ridge Motorsports | Chevrolet |
| 30 | Michael Waltrip | Bahari Racing | Pontiac |
| 31 | Ward Burton | A.G. Dillard Motorsports | Chevrolet |
| 32 | Chuck Bown | Active Motorsports | Chevrolet |
| 33 | Robert Pressley (R) | Leo Jackson Motorsports | Chevrolet |
| 37 | John Andretti | Kranefuss-Haas Racing | Ford |
| 40 | Greg Sacks | Dick Brooks Racing | Pontiac |
| 41 | Ricky Craven (R) | Larry Hedrick Motorsports | Chevrolet |
| 42 | Kyle Petty | Team SABCO | Pontiac |
| 43 | Bobby Hamilton | Petty Enterprises | Pontiac |
| 47 | Billy Standridge | Standridge Motorsports | Ford |
| 52 | Randy MacDonald | Jimmy Means Racing | Ford |
| 71 | Dave Marcis | Marcis Auto Racing | Chevrolet |
| 75 | Todd Bodine | Butch Mock Motorsports | Ford |
| 77 | Davy Jones (R) | Jasper Motorsports | Ford |
| 78 | Jay Hedgecock | Triad Motorsports | Ford |
| 81 | Kenny Wallace | FILMAR Racing | Ford |
| 87 | Joe Nemechek | NEMCO Motorsports | Chevrolet |
| 90 | Mike Wallace | Donlavey Racing | Ford |
| 94 | Bill Elliott | Elliott-Hardy Racing | Ford |
| 98 | Jeremy Mayfield | Cale Yarborough Motorsports | Ford |

== Qualifying ==
Qualifying was split into two rounds. The first round was held on Friday, March 24, at 2:30 PM EST. Each driver would have one lap to set a time. During the first round, the top 20 drivers in the round would be guaranteed a starting spot in the race. If a driver was not able to guarantee a spot in the first round, they had the option to scrub their time from the first round and try and run a faster lap time in a second round qualifying run, held on Saturday, March 25, at 10:00 AM EST. As with the first round, each driver would have one lap to set a time. For this specific race, positions 21-32 would be decided on time, and depending on who needed it, a select amount of positions were given to cars who had not otherwise qualified but were high enough in owner's points; which was usually four. If needed, a past champion who did not qualify on either time or provisionals could use a champion's provisional, adding one more spot to the field.

Jeff Gordon, driving for Hendrick Motorsports, would win the pole, setting a time of 18.945 and an average speed of 118.765 miles per hour (191.134 km/h) in the first round.

Nine drivers would fail to qualify: Jeremy Mayfield, Kenny Wallace, Chuck Bown, Jay Hedgecock, Davy Jones, Billy Standridge, Jeff Purvis, Steve Kinser, and Randy MacDonald.

=== Full qualifying results ===
| Pos. | # | Driver | Team | Make | Time | Speed |
|---|---|---|---|---|---|---|
| 1 | 24 | Jeff Gordon | Hendrick Motorsports | Chevrolet | 18.945 | 118.765 |
| 2 | 11 | Brett Bodine | Brett Bodine Racing | Ford | 18.959 | 118.677 |
| 3 | 12 | Derrike Cope | Bobby Allison Motorsports | Ford | 19.011 | 118.353 |
| 4 | 43 | Bobby Hamilton | Petty Enterprises | Pontiac | 19.012 | 118.346 |
| 5 | 3 | Dale Earnhardt | Richard Childress Racing | Chevrolet | 19.052 | 118.098 |
| 6 | 9 | Lake Speed | Melling Racing | Ford | 19.092 | 117.850 |
| 7 | 6 | Mark Martin | Roush Racing | Ford | 19.106 | 117.764 |
| 8 | 87 | Joe Nemechek | NEMCO Motorsports | Chevrolet | 19.108 | 117.752 |
| 9 | 16 | Ted Musgrave | Roush Racing | Ford | 19.135 | 117.586 |
| 10 | 21 | Morgan Shepherd | Wood Brothers Racing | Ford | 19.140 | 117.555 |
| 11 | 2 | Rusty Wallace | Penske Racing South | Ford | 19.154 | 117.469 |
| 12 | 10 | Ricky Rudd | Rudd Performance Motorsports | Ford | 19.166 | 117.395 |
| 13 | 1 | Rick Mast | Precision Products Racing | Ford | 19.175 | 117.340 |
| 14 | 8 | Jeff Burton | Stavola Brothers Racing | Ford | 19.175 | 117.340 |
| 15 | 29 | Steve Grissom | Diamond Ridge Motorsports | Chevrolet | 19.197 | 117.206 |
| 16 | 94 | Bill Elliott | Elliott-Hardy Racing | Ford | 19.197 | 117.206 |
| 17 | 25 | Ken Schrader | Hendrick Motorsports | Chevrolet | 19.207 | 117.145 |
| 18 | 31 | Ward Burton | A.G. Dillard Motorsports | Chevrolet | 19.207 | 117.145 |
| 19 | 15 | Dick Trickle | Bud Moore Engineering | Ford | 19.208 | 117.139 |
| 20 | 4 | Sterling Marlin | Morgan–McClure Motorsports | Chevrolet | 19.210 | 117.126 |
Failed to lock in Round 1
| 21 | 41 | Ricky Craven (R) | Larry Hedrick Motorsports | Chevrolet | 19.216 | 117.090 |
| 22 | 17 | Darrell Waltrip | Darrell Waltrip Motorsports | Chevrolet | 19.217 | 117.084 |
| 23 | 30 | Michael Waltrip | Bahari Racing | Pontiac | 19.218 | 117.078 |
| 24 | 42 | Kyle Petty | Team SABCO | Pontiac | 19.218 | 117.078 |
| 25 | 75 | Todd Bodine | Butch Mock Motorsports | Ford | 19.218 | 117.078 |
| 26 | 90 | Mike Wallace | Donlavey Racing | Ford | 19.222 | 117.053 |
| 27 | 7 | Geoff Bodine | Geoff Bodine Racing | Ford | 19.248 | 116.895 |
| 28 | 33 | Robert Pressley (R) | Leo Jackson Motorsports | Chevrolet | 19.259 | 116.828 |
| 29 | 23 | Jimmy Spencer | Travis Carter Enterprises | Ford | 19.262 | 116.810 |
| 30 | 5 | Terry Labonte | Hendrick Motorsports | Chevrolet | 19.268 | 116.774 |
| 31 | 22 | Randy LaJoie (R) | Bill Davis Racing | Pontiac | 19.278 | 116.713 |
| 32 | 40 | Greg Sacks | Dick Brooks Racing | Pontiac | 19.296 | 116.604 |
Provisionals
| 33 | 28 | Dale Jarrett | Robert Yates Racing | Ford | 19.298 | 116.592 |
| 34 | 37 | John Andretti | Kranefuss-Haas Racing | Ford | 19.728 | 114.051 |
| 35 | 18 | Bobby Labonte | Joe Gibbs Racing | Chevrolet | 19.304 | 116.556 |
| 36 | 71 | Dave Marcis | Marcis Auto Racing | Chevrolet | 19.384 | 116.075 |
Failed to qualify
| 37 | 98 | Jeremy Mayfield | Cale Yarborough Motorsports | Ford | -* | -* |
| 38 | 81 | Kenny Wallace | FILMAR Racing | Ford | -* | -* |
| 39 | 32 | Chuck Bown | Active Motorsports | Chevrolet | -* | -* |
| 40 | 78 | Jay Hedgecock | Triad Motorsports | Ford | -* | -* |
| 41 | 77 | Davy Jones (R) | Jasper Motorsports | Ford | -* | -* |
| 42 | 47 | Billy Standridge | Standridge Motorsports | Ford | -* | -* |
| 43 | 27 | Jeff Purvis | Junior Johnson & Associates | Ford | -* | -* |
| 44 | 26 | Steve Kinser | King Racing | Ford | -* | -* |
| 45 | 52 | Randy MacDonald | Jimmy Means Racing | Ford | -* | -* |
Official first round qualifying results
Official starting lineup

== Race results ==
| Fin | St | # | Driver | Team | Make | Laps | Led | Status | Pts | Winnings |
|---|---|---|---|---|---|---|---|---|---|---|
| 1 | 5 | 3 | Dale Earnhardt | Richard Childress Racing | Chevrolet | 400 | 227 | running | 185 | $77,400 |
| 2 | 1 | 24 | Jeff Gordon | Hendrick Motorsports | Chevrolet | 400 | 95 | running | 175 | $61,625 |
| 3 | 7 | 6 | Mark Martin | Roush Racing | Ford | 400 | 25 | running | 170 | $40,250 |
| 4 | 11 | 2 | Rusty Wallace | Penske Racing South | Ford | 400 | 56 | running | 165 | $29,630 |
| 5 | 15 | 29 | Steve Grissom | Diamond Ridge Motorsports | Chevrolet | 400 | 0 | running | 155 | $20,655 |
| 6 | 9 | 16 | Ted Musgrave | Roush Racing | Ford | 399 | 0 | running | 150 | $19,855 |
| 7 | 20 | 4 | Sterling Marlin | Morgan–McClure Motorsports | Chevrolet | 399 | 0 | running | 146 | $22,105 |
| 8 | 13 | 1 | Rick Mast | Precision Products Racing | Ford | 399 | 0 | running | 142 | $17,915 |
| 9 | 2 | 11 | Brett Bodine | Brett Bodine Racing | Ford | 399 | 6 | running | 143 | $21,090 |
| 10 | 22 | 17 | Darrell Waltrip | Darrell Waltrip Motorsports | Chevrolet | 398 | 0 | running | 134 | $19,595 |
| 11 | 33 | 28 | Dale Jarrett | Robert Yates Racing | Ford | 398 | 0 | running | 130 | $24,140 |
| 12 | 17 | 25 | Ken Schrader | Hendrick Motorsports | Chevrolet | 398 | 0 | running | 127 | $16,840 |
| 13 | 4 | 43 | Bobby Hamilton | Petty Enterprises | Pontiac | 398 | 0 | running | 124 | $11,590 |
| 14 | 27 | 7 | Geoff Bodine | Geoff Bodine Racing | Ford | 398 | 0 | running | 121 | $21,815 |
| 15 | 35 | 18 | Bobby Labonte | Joe Gibbs Racing | Chevrolet | 398 | 0 | running | 118 | $16,865 |
| 16 | 30 | 5 | Terry Labonte | Hendrick Motorsports | Chevrolet | 397 | 0 | running | 115 | $21,815 |
| 17 | 34 | 37 | John Andretti | Kranefuss-Haas Racing | Ford | 397 | 12 | running | 117 | $6,915 |
| 18 | 28 | 33 | Robert Pressley (R) | Leo Jackson Motorsports | Chevrolet | 397 | 0 | running | 109 | $16,865 |
| 19 | 10 | 21 | Morgan Shepherd | Wood Brothers Racing | Ford | 396 | 0 | running | 106 | $15,665 |
| 20 | 8 | 87 | Joe Nemechek | NEMCO Motorsports | Chevrolet | 396 | 0 | running | 103 | $8,065 |
| 21 | 25 | 75 | Todd Bodine | Butch Mock Motorsports | Ford | 395 | 0 | running | 100 | $15,390 |
| 22 | 23 | 30 | Michael Waltrip | Bahari Racing | Pontiac | 395 | 0 | running | 100 | $15,240 |
| 23 | 31 | 22 | Randy LaJoie (R) | Bill Davis Racing | Pontiac | 394 | 0 | running | 97 | $15,490 |
| 24 | 18 | 31 | Ward Burton | A.G. Dillard Motorsports | Chevrolet | 394 | 0 | running | 94 | $6,465 |
| 25 | 6 | 9 | Lake Speed | Melling Racing | Ford | 394 | 0 | running | 88 | $6,615 |
| 26 | 14 | 8 | Jeff Burton | Stavola Brothers Racing | Ford | 394 | 0 | running | 85 | $14,765 |
| 27 | 29 | 23 | Jimmy Spencer | Travis Carter Enterprises | Ford | 394 | 0 | running | 82 | $9,565 |
| 28 | 16 | 94 | Bill Elliott | Elliott-Hardy Racing | Ford | 393 | 0 | running | 79 | $6,225 |
| 29 | 12 | 10 | Ricky Rudd | Rudd Performance Motorsports | Ford | 392 | 0 | running | 76 | $19,215 |
| 30 | 3 | 12 | Derrike Cope | Bobby Allison Motorsports | Ford | 392 | 0 | running | 73 | $15,040 |
| 31 | 24 | 42 | Kyle Petty | Team SABCO | Pontiac | 374 | 2 | fatigue | 75 | $13,865 |
| 32 | 19 | 15 | Dick Trickle | Bud Moore Engineering | Ford | 369 | 0 | running | 67 | $14,740 |
| 33 | 21 | 41 | Ricky Craven (R) | Larry Hedrick Motorsports | Chevrolet | 360 | 0 | running | 64 | $8,715 |
| 34 | 36 | 71 | Dave Marcis | Marcis Auto Racing | Chevrolet | 334 | 0 | running | 61 | $7,715 |
| 35 | 32 | 40 | Greg Sacks | Dick Brooks Racing | Pontiac | 325 | 0 | fatigue | 58 | $13,215 |
| 36 | 26 | 90 | Mike Wallace | Donlavey Racing | Ford | 226 | 0 | accident | 55 | $5,715 |
Official race results

| Previous race: 1995 Food City 500 | NASCAR Winston Cup Series; 1995 season | Next race: 1995 Hanes 500 |
