= 1995 Miller Genuine Draft 400 (Richmond) =

24th race of the 1995 NASCAR Winston Cup Series

Race details
- Race 24 of 31 in the 1995 NASCAR Winston Cup Series
- The 1995 Miller 400 program cover, featuring Rusty Wallace. Artwork by NASCAR artist Sam Bass.
- Date: September 9, 1995
- Official name: 38th Annual Miller Genuine Draft 400
- Location: Richmond, Virginia, Richmond International Raceway
- Course: Permanent racing facility
- Course length: 0.75 miles (1.21 km)
- Distance: 400 laps, 300 mi (482.803 km)
- Scheduled distance: 400 laps, 300 mi (482.803 km)
- Average speed: 104.459 miles per hour (168.110 km/h)

Pole position
Driver	Dale Earnhardt	Richard Childress Racing
- Time: 22.033

Most laps led
Driver	Rusty Wallace	Penske Racing South
- Laps: 254

Winner
No. 2	Rusty Wallace	Penske Racing South

Television in the United States
- Network: TBS
- Announcers: Ken Squier, Chad Little, Dick Berggren

Radio in the United States
- Radio: Motor Racing Network

The 1995 Miller Genuine Draft 400 was the 24th stock car race of the 1995 NASCAR Winston Cup Series and the 38th iteration of the event. The race was held on Saturday, September 9, 1995, in Richmond, Virginia, at Richmond International Raceway, a 0.75 miles (1.21 km) D-shaped oval. The race took the scheduled 400 laps to complete. At race's end, Penske Racing South driver Rusty Wallace would manage to dominate the majority of the race to take his 41st career NASCAR Winston Cup Series victory and his second and final victory of the season. To fill out the top three, Hendrick Motorsports driver Terry Labonte and Richard Childress Racing driver Dale Earnhardt would finish second and third, respectively.

== Background ==
The layout of Richmond International Raceway, the venue where the race was at.

Richmond International Raceway (RIR) is a 3/4-mile (1.2 km), D-shaped, asphalt race track located just outside Richmond, Virginia in Henrico County. It hosts the Monster Energy NASCAR Cup Series and Xfinity Series. Known as "America's premier short track", it formerly hosted a NASCAR Camping World Truck Series race, an IndyCar Series race, and two USAC sprint car races.

=== Entry list ===
- (R) denotes rookie driver.

#	Driver	Team	Make
1	Rick Mast	Precision Products Racing	Pontiac
2	Rusty Wallace	Penske Racing South	Ford
3	Dale Earnhardt	Richard Childress Racing	Chevrolet
4	Sterling Marlin	Morgan–McClure Motorsports	Chevrolet
5	Terry Labonte	Hendrick Motorsports	Chevrolet
6	Mark Martin	Roush Racing	Ford
7	Geoff Bodine	Geoff Bodine Racing	Ford
8	Jeff Burton	Stavola Brothers Racing	Ford
9	Lake Speed	Melling Racing	Ford
10	Ricky Rudd	Rudd Performance Motorsports	Ford
11	Brett Bodine	Junior Johnson & Associates	Ford
12	Derrike Cope	Bobby Allison Motorsports	Ford
15	Dick Trickle	Bud Moore Engineering	Ford
16	Ted Musgrave	Roush Racing	Ford
17	Darrell Waltrip	Darrell Waltrip Motorsports	Chevrolet
18	Bobby Labonte	Joe Gibbs Racing	Chevrolet
21	Morgan Shepherd	Wood Brothers Racing	Ford
22	Ward Burton	Bill Davis Racing	Pontiac
23	Jimmy Spencer	Haas-Carter Motorsports	Ford
24	Jeff Gordon	Hendrick Motorsports	Chevrolet
25	Ken Schrader	Hendrick Motorsports	Chevrolet
26	Hut Stricklin	King Racing	Ford
27	Elton Sawyer	Junior Johnson & Associates	Ford
28	Dale Jarrett	Robert Yates Racing	Ford
29	Steve Grissom	Diamond Ridge Motorsports	Chevrolet
30	Michael Waltrip	Bahari Racing	Pontiac
31	Greg Sacks	A.G. Dillard Motorsports	Chevrolet
32	Ed Berrier	Active Motorsports	Chevrolet
33	Robert Pressley (R)	Leo Jackson Motorsports	Chevrolet
37	John Andretti	Kranefuss-Haas Racing	Ford
40	Shane Hall	Dick Brooks Racing	Pontiac
41	Ricky Craven (R)	Larry Hedrick Motorsports	Chevrolet
42	Kyle Petty	Team SABCO	Pontiac
43	Bobby Hamilton	Petty Enterprises	Pontiac
49	Eric Smith	Smith Racing	Ford
71	Dave Marcis	Marcis Auto Racing	Chevrolet
75	Todd Bodine	Butch Mock Motorsports	Ford
77	Bobby Hillin Jr.	Jasper Motorsports	Ford
78	Jay Hedgecock	Triad Motorsports	Ford
81	Kenny Wallace	FILMAR Racing	Ford
87	Joe Nemechek	NEMCO Motorsports	Chevrolet
90	Mike Wallace	Donlavey Racing	Ford
94	Bill Elliott	Elliott-Hardy Racing	Ford
98	Jeremy Mayfield	Cale Yarborough Motorsports	Ford

== Qualifying ==
Qualifying was split into two rounds. The first round was held on Friday, September 8, at 5:30 PM EST. Each driver would have one lap to set a time. During the first round, the top 20 drivers in the round would be guaranteed a starting spot in the race. If a driver was not able to guarantee a spot in the first round, they had the option to scrub their time from the first round and try and run a faster lap time in a second round qualifying run, held on Saturday, September 9, at 4:00 PM EST. As with the first round, each driver would have one lap to set a time. For this specific race, positions 21-34 would be decided on time, and depending on who needed it, a select amount of positions were given to cars who had not otherwise qualified but were high enough in owner's points; which was usually four. If needed, a past champion who did not qualify on either time or provisionals could use a champion's provisional, adding one more spot to the field.

Dale Earnhardt, driving for Richard Childress Racing, would win the pole, setting a time of 22.033 and an average speed of 122.543 miles per hour (197.214 km/h) in the first round.

Six drivers would fail to qualify.

=== Full qualifying results ===
Pos.	#	Driver	Team	Make	Time	Speed
1	3	Dale Earnhardt	Richard Childress Racing	Chevrolet	22.033	122.543
2	24	Jeff Gordon	Hendrick Motorsports	Chevrolet	22.049	122.455
3	25	Ken Schrader	Hendrick Motorsports	Chevrolet	22.057	122.410
4	33	Robert Pressley (R)	Leo Jackson Motorsports	Chevrolet	22.071	122.332
5	6	Mark Martin	Roush Racing	Ford	22.076	122.305
6	71	Dave Marcis	Marcis Auto Racing	Chevrolet	22.081	122.277
7	2	Rusty Wallace	Penske Racing South	Ford	22.093	122.211
8	4	Sterling Marlin	Morgan–McClure Motorsports	Chevrolet	22.108	122.128
9	43	Bobby Hamilton	Petty Enterprises	Pontiac	22.124	122.039
10	16	Ted Musgrave	Roush Racing	Ford	22.129	122.012
11	11	Brett Bodine	Junior Johnson & Associates	Ford	22.139	121.957
12	10	Ricky Rudd	Rudd Performance Motorsports	Ford	22.142	121.940
13	81	Kenny Wallace	FILMAR Racing	Ford	22.142	121.940
14	12	Derrike Cope	Bobby Allison Motorsports	Ford	22.146	121.918
15	17	Darrell Waltrip	Darrell Waltrip Motorsports	Chevrolet	22.152	121.885
16	1	Rick Mast	Precision Products Racing	Ford	22.154	121.874
17	18	Bobby Labonte	Joe Gibbs Racing	Chevrolet	22.177	121.748
18	87	Joe Nemechek	NEMCO Motorsports	Chevrolet	22.184	121.709
19	30	Michael Waltrip	Bahari Racing	Pontiac	22.187	121.693
20	8	Jeff Burton	Stavola Brothers Racing	Ford	22.203	121.605
Failed to lock in Round 1
21	42	Kyle Petty	Team SABCO	Pontiac	22.218	121.523
22	94	Bill Elliott	Elliott-Hardy Racing	Ford	22.219	121.518
23	5	Terry Labonte	Hendrick Motorsports	Chevrolet	22.241	121.397
24	22	Ward Burton	Bill Davis Racing	Pontiac	22.273	121.223
25	26	Hut Stricklin	King Racing	Ford	22.276	121.207
26	15	Dick Trickle	Bud Moore Engineering	Ford	22.277	121.201
27	28	Dale Jarrett	Robert Yates Racing	Ford	22.287	121.147
28	77	Bobby Hillin Jr.	Jasper Motorsports	Ford	22.295	121.103
29	75	Todd Bodine	Butch Mock Motorsports	Ford	22.320	120.968
30	7	Geoff Bodine	Geoff Bodine Racing	Ford	22.347	120.822
31	37	John Andretti	Kranefuss-Haas Racing	Ford	22.349	120.811
32	27	Elton Sawyer	Junior Johnson & Associates	Ford	22.358	120.762
33	31	Greg Sacks	A.G. Dillard Motorsports	Chevrolet	22.370	120.697
34	21	Morgan Shepherd	Wood Brothers Racing	Ford	22.382	120.633
Provisionals
35	9	Lake Speed	Melling Racing	Ford	-*	-*
36	41	Ricky Craven (R)	Larry Hedrick Motorsports	Chevrolet	-*	-*
37	23	Jimmy Spencer	Travis Carter Enterprises	Ford	-*	-*
38	98	Jeremy Mayfield	Cale Yarborough Motorsports	Ford	-*	-*
Failed to qualify
39	32	Ed Berrier	Active Motorsports	Chevrolet	-*	-*
40	78	Jay Hedgecock	Triad Motorsports	Ford	-*	-*
41	40	Shane Hall	Dick Brooks Racing	Pontiac	-*	-*
42	29	Steve Grissom	Diamond Ridge Motorsports	Chevrolet	-*	-*
43	90	Mike Wallace	Donlavey Racing	Ford	-*	-*
44	49	Eric Smith	Smith Racing	Ford	-*	-*
Official first round qualifying results

== Race results ==
Fin	St	#	Driver	Team	Make	Laps	Led	Status	Pts	Winnings
1	7	2	Rusty Wallace	Penske Racing South	Ford	400	254	running	185	$64,515
2	23	5	Terry Labonte	Hendrick Motorsports	Chevrolet	400	2	running	175	$49,065
3	1	3	Dale Earnhardt	Richard Childress Racing	Chevrolet	400	73	running	170	$54,005
4	27	28	Dale Jarrett	Robert Yates Racing	Ford	400	0	running	160	$40,605
5	9	43	Bobby Hamilton	Petty Enterprises	Pontiac	400	5	running	160	$26,805
6	2	24	Jeff Gordon	Hendrick Motorsports	Chevrolet	400	63	running	155	$38,255
7	31	37	John Andretti	Kranefuss-Haas Racing	Ford	399	1	running	151	$24,755
8	12	10	Ricky Rudd	Rudd Performance Motorsports	Ford	399	0	running	142	$25,455
9	3	25	Ken Schrader	Hendrick Motorsports	Chevrolet	399	0	running	138	$21,755
10	10	16	Ted Musgrave	Roush Racing	Ford	399	0	running	134	$25,205
11	24	22	Ward Burton	Bill Davis Racing	Pontiac	398	0	running	130	$20,605
12	16	1	Rick Mast	Precision Products Racing	Ford	398	0	running	127	$20,305
13	20	8	Jeff Burton	Stavola Brothers Racing	Ford	397	0	running	124	$20,155
14	22	94	Bill Elliott	Elliott-Hardy Racing	Ford	397	2	running	126	$14,955
15	5	6	Mark Martin	Roush Racing	Ford	397	0	running	118	$25,955
16	11	11	Brett Bodine	Junior Johnson & Associates	Ford	397	0	running	115	$23,780
17	17	18	Bobby Labonte	Joe Gibbs Racing	Chevrolet	397	0	running	112	$23,680
18	26	15	Dick Trickle	Bud Moore Engineering	Ford	397	0	running	109	$19,430
19	30	7	Geoff Bodine	Geoff Bodine Racing	Ford	397	0	running	106	$25,205
20	13	81	Kenny Wallace	FILMAR Racing	Ford	397	0	running	103	$12,330
21	35	9	Lake Speed	Melling Racing	Ford	396	0	running	100	$14,230
22	15	17	Darrell Waltrip	Darrell Waltrip Motorsports	Chevrolet	396	0	running	97	$19,105
23	38	98	Jeremy Mayfield	Cale Yarborough Motorsports	Ford	396	0	running	94	$13,930
24	29	75	Todd Bodine	Butch Mock Motorsports	Ford	396	0	running	91	$18,805
25	21	42	Kyle Petty	Team SABCO	Pontiac	395	0	running	88	$18,855
26	18	87	Joe Nemechek	NEMCO Motorsports	Chevrolet	395	0	running	85	$13,530
27	34	21	Morgan Shepherd	Wood Brothers Racing	Ford	395	0	running	82	$18,405
28	19	30	Michael Waltrip	Bahari Racing	Pontiac	394	0	running	79	$18,280
29	36	41	Ricky Craven (R)	Larry Hedrick Motorsports	Chevrolet	394	0	running	76	$14,255
30	4	33	Robert Pressley (R)	Leo Jackson Motorsports	Chevrolet	394	0	running	73	$18,205
31	37	23	Jimmy Spencer	Travis Carter Enterprises	Ford	392	0	running	70	$10,155
32	25	26	Hut Stricklin	King Racing	Ford	391	0	running	67	$15,130
33	8	4	Sterling Marlin	Morgan–McClure Motorsports	Chevrolet	337	0	rear end	64	$24,125
34	14	12	Derrike Cope	Bobby Allison Motorsports	Ford	332	0	rear end	61	$10,105
35	6	71	Dave Marcis	Marcis Auto Racing	Chevrolet	315	0	running	58	$10,105
36	28	77	Bobby Hillin Jr.	Jasper Motorsports	Ford	313	0	engine	55	$10,105
37	33	31	Greg Sacks	A.G. Dillard Motorsports	Chevrolet	188	0	crash	52	$10,105
38	32	27	Elton Sawyer	Junior Johnson & Associates	Ford	66	0	crash	49	$18,105
Official race results

Previous race: 1995 Mountain Dew Southern 500	NASCAR Winston Cup Series; 1995 season	Next race: 1995 MBNA 500
