= 1993 First Union 400 =

Seventh race of the 1993 NASCAR Winston Cup Series

Race details
- Race 7 of 30 in the 1993 NASCAR Winston Cup Series
- The 1993 First Union 400 program cover, featuring Davey Allison.
- Date: April 18, 1993
- Official name: 43rd Annual First Union 400
- Location: North Wilkesboro Speedway, North Wilkesboro, North Carolina
- Course: Permanent racing facility
- Course length: 0.625 miles (1.006 km)
- Distance: 400 laps, 250 mi (402.336 km)
- Average speed: 92.602 miles per hour (149.028 km/h)
- Attendance: 45,000

Pole position
Driver	Brett Bodine	King Racing
- Time: 19.228

Most laps led
Driver	Sterling Marlin	Stavola Brothers Racing
- Laps: 190

Winner
No. 2	Rusty Wallace	Penske Racing South

Television in the United States
- Network: ESPN
- Announcers: Bob Jenkins, Ned Jarrett, Benny Parsons

Radio in the United States
- Radio: Motor Racing Network

The 1993 First Union 400 was the seventh stock car race of the 1993 NASCAR Winston Cup Series season and the 43rd iteration of the event. The race was held on Sunday, April 18, 1993, before an audience of 45,000 in North Wilkesboro, North Carolina at the North Wilkesboro Speedway, a 0.625 miles (1.006 km) oval short track. The race took the scheduled 400 laps to complete. At race's end, Penske Racing South driver Rusty Wallace would manage to pull away in the final one-fourth of the race to take his 24th career NASCAR Winston Cup Series victory and his third victory of the season. To fill out the top three, SABCO Racing driver Kyle Petty and Hendrick Motorsports driver Ken Schrader would finish second and third, respectively.

== Background ==
The layout of North Wilkesboro Speedway, the venue where the race was held.

North Wilkesboro Speedway is a short oval racetrack located on U.S. Route 421, about five miles east of the town of North Wilkesboro, North Carolina, or 80 miles north of Charlotte. It measures 0.625 mi (1.006 km) and features a unique uphill backstretch and downhill frontstretch. It has previously held races in NASCAR's top three series, including 93 Winston Cup Series races. The track, a NASCAR original, operated from 1949, NASCAR's inception, until the track's original closure in 1996. The speedway briefly reopened in 2010 and hosted several stock car series races before closing again in the spring of 2011. It was re-opened in August 2022 for grassroots racing.

=== Entry list ===
- (R) denotes rookie driver.

#	Driver	Team	Make
1	Rick Mast	Precision Products Racing	Ford
2	Rusty Wallace	Penske Racing South	Pontiac
3	Dale Earnhardt	Richard Childress Racing	Chevrolet
4	Ernie Irvan	Morgan–McClure Motorsports	Chevrolet
5	Ricky Rudd	Hendrick Motorsports	Chevrolet
6	Mark Martin	Roush Racing	Ford
7	Jimmy Hensley	AK Racing	Ford
8	Sterling Marlin	Stavola Brothers Racing	Ford
11	Bill Elliott	Junior Johnson & Associates	Ford
12	Jimmy Spencer	Bobby Allison Motorsports	Ford
14	Terry Labonte	Hagan Racing	Chevrolet
15	Geoff Bodine	Bud Moore Engineering	Ford
16	Wally Dallenbach Jr.	Roush Racing	Ford
17	Darrell Waltrip	Darrell Waltrip Motorsports	Chevrolet
18	Dale Jarrett	Joe Gibbs Racing	Chevrolet
21	Morgan Shepherd	Wood Brothers Racing	Ford
22	Bobby Labonte (R)	Bill Davis Racing	Ford
24	Jeff Gordon (R)	Hendrick Motorsports	Chevrolet
25	Ken Schrader	Hendrick Motorsports	Chevrolet
26	Brett Bodine	King Racing	Ford
27	Hut Stricklin	Junior Johnson & Associates	Ford
28	Davey Allison	Robert Yates Racing	Ford
30	Michael Waltrip	Bahari Racing	Pontiac
32	Jimmy Horton	Active Motorsports	Chevrolet
33	Harry Gant	Leo Jackson Motorsports	Chevrolet
40	Kenny Wallace (R)	SABCO Racing	Pontiac
41	Phil Parsons	Larry Hedrick Motorsports	Chevrolet
42	Kyle Petty	SABCO Racing	Pontiac
44	Rick Wilson	Petty Enterprises	Pontiac
48	James Hylton	Hylton Motorsports	Pontiac
49	Stanley Smith	BS&S Motorsports	Chevrolet
52	Jimmy Means	Jimmy Means Racing	Ford
55	Ted Musgrave	RaDiUs Motorsports	Ford
68	Bobby Hamilton	TriStar Motorsports	Ford
71	Dave Marcis	Marcis Auto Racing	Chevrolet
75	Dick Trickle	Butch Mock Motorsports	Ford
78	Jay Hedgecock	Triad Motorsports	Ford
90	Bobby Hillin Jr.	Donlavey Racing	Ford
98	Derrike Cope	Cale Yarborough Motorsports	Ford

== Qualifying ==
Qualifying was split into two rounds. The first round was held on Friday, April 16, at 2:00 PM EST. Each driver would have one lap to set a time. During the first round, the top 20 drivers in the round would be guaranteed a starting spot in the race. If a driver was not able to guarantee a spot in the first round, they had the option to scrub their time from the first round and try and run a faster lap time in a second round qualifying run, held on Saturday, April 17, at 12:15 PM EST. As with the first round, each driver would have one lap to set a time. For this specific race, positions 21-32 would be decided on time, and depending on who needed it, a select amount of positions were given to cars who had not otherwise qualified but were high enough in owner's points; up to two were given. If needed, a past champion who did not qualify on either time or provisionals could use a champion's provisional, adding one more spot to the field.

Brett Bodine, driving for King Racing, won the pole, setting a time of 19.228 and an average speed of 117.017 mph (188.321 km/h) in the first round.

Five drivers would fail to qualify.

=== Full qualifying results ===
Pos.	#	Driver	Team	Make	Time	Speed
1	26	Brett Bodine	King Racing	Ford	19.228	117.017
2	15	Geoff Bodine	Bud Moore Engineering	Ford	19.284	116.677
3	4	Ernie Irvan	Morgan–McClure Motorsports	Chevrolet	19.310	116.520
4	25	Ken Schrader	Hendrick Motorsports	Chevrolet	19.345	116.309
5	27	Hut Stricklin	Junior Johnson & Associates	Ford	19.358	116.231
6	14	Terry Labonte	Hagan Racing	Chevrolet	19.361	116.213
7	24	Jeff Gordon (R)	Hendrick Motorsports	Chevrolet	19.373	116.141
8	8	Sterling Marlin	Stavola Brothers Racing	Ford	19.374	116.135
9	2	Rusty Wallace	Penske Racing South	Pontiac	19.378	116.111
10	5	Ricky Rudd	Hendrick Motorsports	Chevrolet	19.379	116.105
11	18	Dale Jarrett	Joe Gibbs Racing	Chevrolet	19.404	115.955
12	6	Mark Martin	Roush Racing	Ford	19.407	115.938
13	7	Jimmy Hensley	AK Racing	Ford	19.413	115.902
14	12	Jimmy Spencer	Bobby Allison Motorsports	Ford	19.429	115.806
15	11	Bill Elliott	Junior Johnson & Associates	Ford	19.434	115.776
16	75	Dick Trickle	Butch Mock Motorsports	Ford	19.441	115.735
17	21	Morgan Shepherd	Wood Brothers Racing	Ford	19.443	115.723
18	98	Derrike Cope	Cale Yarborough Motorsports	Ford	19.448	115.693
19	33	Harry Gant	Leo Jackson Motorsports	Chevrolet	19.450	115.681
20	30	Michael Waltrip	Bahari Racing	Pontiac	19.472	115.551
Failed to lock in Round 1
21	3	Dale Earnhardt	Richard Childress Racing	Chevrolet	19.130	117.616
22	42	Kyle Petty	SABCO Racing	Pontiac	19.317	116.478
23	17	Darrell Waltrip	Darrell Waltrip Motorsports	Chevrolet	19.380	116.099
24	40	Kenny Wallace (R)	SABCO Racing	Pontiac	19.399	115.985
25	1	Rick Mast	Precision Products Racing	Ford	19.459	115.628
26	44	Rick Wilson	Petty Enterprises	Pontiac	19.472	115.551
27	28	Davey Allison	Robert Yates Racing	Ford	19.473	115.545
28	41	Phil Parsons	Larry Hedrick Motorsports	Chevrolet	19.475	115.533
29	68	Bobby Hamilton	TriStar Motorsports	Ford	19.525	115.237
30	22	Bobby Labonte (R)	Bill Davis Racing	Ford	19.552	115.078
31	55	Ted Musgrave	RaDiUs Motorsports	Ford	19.571	114.966
32	90	Bobby Hillin Jr.	Donlavey Racing	Ford	19.601	114.790
Provisionals
33	16	Wally Dallenbach Jr.	Roush Racing	Ford	19.802	113.625
34	52	Jimmy Means	Jimmy Means Racing	Ford	19.847	113.367
Failed to qualify
35	49	Stanley Smith	BS&S Motorsports	Chevrolet	-*	-*
36	71	Dave Marcis	Marcis Auto Racing	Chevrolet	-*	-*
37	32	Jimmy Horton	Active Motorsports	Chevrolet	-*	-*
38	48	James Hylton	Hylton Motorsports	Pontiac	-*	-*
39	78	Jay Hedgecock	Triad Motorsports	Ford	-*	-*
Official first round qualifying results
Official starting lineup

== Race results ==
Fin	St	#	Driver	Team	Make	Laps	Led	Status	Pts	Winnings
1	9	2	Rusty Wallace	Penske Racing South	Pontiac	400	120	running	180	$43,535
2	22	42	Kyle Petty	SABCO Racing	Pontiac	400	0	running	170	$29,210
3	4	25	Ken Schrader	Hendrick Motorsports	Chevrolet	400	58	running	170	$40,235
4	27	28	Davey Allison	Robert Yates Racing	Ford	400	0	running	160	$28,285
5	23	17	Darrell Waltrip	Darrell Waltrip Motorsports	Chevrolet	400	2	running	160	$25,935
6	6	14	Terry Labonte	Hagan Racing	Chevrolet	400	0	running	150	$18,235
7	10	5	Ricky Rudd	Hendrick Motorsports	Chevrolet	400	0	running	146	$14,960
8	17	21	Morgan Shepherd	Wood Brothers Racing	Ford	400	1	running	147	$12,805
9	8	8	Sterling Marlin	Stavola Brothers Racing	Ford	400	190	running	148	$13,880
10	15	11	Bill Elliott	Junior Johnson & Associates	Ford	398	0	running	134	$18,860
11	3	4	Ernie Irvan	Morgan–McClure Motorsports	Chevrolet	398	3	running	135	$15,780
12	13	7	Jimmy Hensley	AK Racing	Ford	398	0	running	127	$13,330
13	19	33	Harry Gant	Leo Jackson Motorsports	Chevrolet	398	0	running	124	$14,780
14	14	12	Jimmy Spencer	Bobby Allison Motorsports	Ford	397	0	running	121	$11,430
15	24	40	Kenny Wallace (R)	SABCO Racing	Pontiac	396	1	running	123	$6,930
16	21	3	Dale Earnhardt	Richard Childress Racing	Chevrolet	396	0	running	115	$13,130
17	1	26	Brett Bodine	King Racing	Ford	396	24	running	117	$18,355
18	28	41	Phil Parsons	Larry Hedrick Motorsports	Chevrolet	395	0	running	109	$7,505
19	25	1	Rick Mast	Precision Products Racing	Ford	395	0	running	106	$10,330
20	20	30	Michael Waltrip	Bahari Racing	Pontiac	394	0	running	103	$10,130
21	33	16	Wally Dallenbach Jr.	Roush Racing	Ford	394	0	running	100	$10,030
22	5	27	Hut Stricklin	Junior Johnson & Associates	Ford	393	0	running	97	$9,855
23	26	44	Rick Wilson	Petty Enterprises	Pontiac	393	0	running	94	$6,580
24	31	55	Ted Musgrave	RaDiUs Motorsports	Ford	393	0	running	91	$9,530
25	30	22	Bobby Labonte (R)	Bill Davis Racing	Ford	391	0	running	88	$5,580
26	32	90	Bobby Hillin Jr.	Donlavey Racing	Ford	388	0	running	85	$4,430
27	34	52	Jimmy Means	Jimmy Means Racing	Ford	388	0	running	82	$4,755
28	2	15	Geoff Bodine	Bud Moore Engineering	Ford	369	0	running	79	$13,690
29	29	68	Bobby Hamilton	TriStar Motorsports	Ford	359	0	running	76	$6,255
30	18	98	Derrike Cope	Cale Yarborough Motorsports	Ford	357	0	running	73	$8,805
31	12	6	Mark Martin	Roush Racing	Ford	340	0	running	70	$12,205
32	11	18	Dale Jarrett	Joe Gibbs Racing	Chevrolet	311	1	engine	72	$12,155
33	16	75	Dick Trickle	Butch Mock Motorsports	Ford	199	0	engine	64	$4,155
34	7	24	Jeff Gordon (R)	Hendrick Motorsports	Chevrolet	25	0	crash	61	$4,180
Official race results

== Standings after the race ==
Drivers' Championship standings

	Pos	Driver	Points
1	1	Rusty Wallace	1,112
1	2	Dale Earnhardt	1,094 (-18)
2	3	Davey Allison	964 (-148)
4	4	Kyle Petty	944 (–168)
2	5	Morgan Shepherd	942 (–170)
3	6	Geoff Bodine	940 (–172)
3	7	Mark Martin	925 (–187)
2	8	Dale Jarrett	874 (–238)
1	9	Jimmy Spencer	859 (–253)
1	10	Ernie Irvan	853 (–259)
Official driver's standings

- Note: Only the first 10 positions are included for the driver standings.

Previous race: 1993 Food City 500	NASCAR Winston Cup Series; 1993 season	Next race: 1993 Hanes 500
