= 1995 Mountain Dew Southern 500 =

23rd race of the 1995 NASCAR Winston Cup Series

Race details
- Race 23 of 31 in the 1995 NASCAR Winston Cup Series
- The 1995 Mountain Dew Southern 500 program cover, featuring Bobby Labonte, Sterling Marlin, Bill Elliott, and Mark Martin.
- Date: September 3, 1995
- Official name: 46th Annual Mountain Dew Southern 500
- Location: Darlington Raceway, Darlington, South Carolina
- Course: Permanent racing facility
- Course length: 1.366 miles (2.198 km)
- Distance: 367 laps, 501.322 mi (806.799 km)
- Average speed: 121.231 miles per hour (195.102 km/h)

Pole position
Driver	John Andretti	Kranefuss-Haas Racing
- Time: 29.380

Most laps led
Driver	Dale Earnhardt	Richard Childress Racing
- Laps: 208

Winner
No. 24	Jeff Gordon	Hendrick Motorsports

Television in the United States
- Network: ESPN
- Announcers: Bob Jenkins, Ned Jarrett, Benny Parsons

Radio in the United States
- Radio: Motor Racing Network

The 1995 Mountain Dew Southern 500 was the 23rd stock car race of the 1995 NASCAR Winston Cup Series and the 46th iteration of the event. The race was held on Sunday, September 3, 1995, in Darlington, South Carolina, at Darlington Raceway, a 1.366 miles (2.198 km) permanent egg-shaped oval racetrack. The race took the scheduled 367 laps to complete. On the final restart with nine to go, Hendrick Motorsports driver Jeff Gordon would manage to pull away from the field to take his eighth career NASCAR Winston Cup Series victory and his sixth victory of the season. To fill out the top three, Richard Childress Racing driver Dale Earnhardt and Penske Racing South driver Rusty Wallace would finish second and third, respectively.

== Background ==
The layout of Darlington Raceway, the venue where the race was held.

Darlington Raceway is a race track built for NASCAR racing located near Darlington, South Carolina. It is nicknamed "The Lady in Black" and "The Track Too Tough to Tame" by many NASCAR fans and drivers and advertised as "A NASCAR Tradition." It is of a unique, somewhat egg-shaped design, an oval with the ends of very different configurations, a condition which supposedly arose from the proximity of one end of the track to a minnow pond the owner refused to relocate. This situation makes it very challenging for the crews to set up their cars' handling in a way that is effective at both ends.

=== Entry list ===
- (R) denotes rookie driver.

#	Driver	Team	Make
1	Rick Mast	Precision Products Racing	Pontiac
2	Rusty Wallace	Penske Racing South	Ford
3	Dale Earnhardt	Richard Childress Racing	Chevrolet
4	Sterling Marlin	Morgan–McClure Motorsports	Chevrolet
5	Terry Labonte	Hendrick Motorsports	Chevrolet
6	Mark Martin	Roush Racing	Ford
7	Geoff Bodine	Geoff Bodine Racing	Ford
8	Jeff Burton	Stavola Brothers Racing	Ford
9	Lake Speed	Melling Racing	Ford
10	Ricky Rudd	Rudd Performance Motorsports	Ford
11	Brett Bodine	Junior Johnson & Associates	Ford
12	Derrike Cope	Bobby Allison Motorsports	Ford
15	Dick Trickle	Bud Moore Engineering	Ford
16	Ted Musgrave	Roush Racing	Ford
17	Darrell Waltrip	Darrell Waltrip Motorsports	Chevrolet
18	Bobby Labonte	Joe Gibbs Racing	Chevrolet
19	Loy Allen Jr.	TriStar Motorsports	Ford
21	Morgan Shepherd	Wood Brothers Racing	Ford
22	Ward Burton	Bill Davis Racing	Pontiac
23	Jimmy Spencer	Haas-Carter Motorsports	Ford
24	Jeff Gordon	Hendrick Motorsports	Chevrolet
25	Ken Schrader	Hendrick Motorsports	Chevrolet
26	Hut Stricklin	King Racing	Ford
27	Elton Sawyer	Junior Johnson & Associates	Ford
28	Dale Jarrett	Robert Yates Racing	Ford
29	Steve Grissom	Diamond Ridge Motorsports	Chevrolet
30	Michael Waltrip	Bahari Racing	Pontiac
31	Greg Sacks	A.G. Dillard Motorsports	Chevrolet
32	Ed Berrier	Active Motorsports	Chevrolet
33	Robert Pressley (R)	Leo Jackson Motorsports	Chevrolet
37	John Andretti	Kranefuss-Haas Racing	Ford
40	Rich Bickle	Dick Brooks Racing	Pontiac
41	Ricky Craven (R)	Larry Hedrick Motorsports	Chevrolet
42	Kyle Petty	Team SABCO	Pontiac
43	Bobby Hamilton	Petty Enterprises	Pontiac
52	Brad Teague	Jimmy Means Racing	Ford
66	Billy Standridge	Johnson Standridge Racing	Ford
71	Dave Marcis	Marcis Auto Racing	Chevrolet
75	Todd Bodine	Butch Mock Motorsports	Ford
77	Bobby Hillin Jr.	Jasper Motorsports	Ford
87	Joe Nemechek	NEMCO Motorsports	Chevrolet
88	Gary Bradberry	Bradberry Racing	Chevrolet
90	Mike Wallace	Donlavey Racing	Ford
94	Bill Elliott	Elliott-Hardy Racing	Ford
98	Jeremy Mayfield	Cale Yarborough Motorsports	Ford

== Qualifying ==
Qualifying was split into two rounds. The first round was held on Friday, March 24, at 2:30 PM EST. Each driver would have one lap to set a time. During the first round, the top 20 drivers in the round would be guaranteed a starting spot in the race. If a driver was not able to guarantee a spot in the first round, they had the option to scrub their time from the first round and try and run a faster lap time in a second round qualifying run, held on Saturday, March 25, at 10:00 AM EST. As with the first round, each driver would have one lap to set a time. For this specific race, positions 21-38 would be decided on time, and depending on who needed it, a select amount of positions were given to cars who had not otherwise qualified but were high enough in owner's points; up to four were given. If needed, a past champion who did not qualify on either time or provisionals could use a champion's provisional, adding one more spot to the field.

John Andretti, driving for Kranefuss-Haas Racing, would win the pole, setting a time of 29.380 and an average speed of 167.379 miles per hour (269.370 km/h) in the first round.

Three drivers would fail to qualify.

=== Full qualifying results ===
Pos.	#	Driver	Team	Make	Time	Speed
1	37	John Andretti	Kranefuss-Haas Racing	Ford	29.380	167.379
2	10	Ricky Rudd	Rudd Performance Motorsports	Ford	29.414	167.186
3	3	Dale Earnhardt	Richard Childress Racing	Chevrolet	29.535	166.501
4	15	Dick Trickle	Bud Moore Engineering	Ford	29.557	166.377
5	24	Jeff Gordon	Hendrick Motorsports	Chevrolet	29.559	166.366
6	4	Sterling Marlin	Morgan–McClure Motorsports	Chevrolet	29.611	166.073
7	9	Lake Speed	Melling Racing	Ford	29.682	165.676
8	22	Ward Burton	Bill Davis Racing	Pontiac	29.684	165.665
9	7	Geoff Bodine	Geoff Bodine Racing	Ford	29.756	165.264
10	26	Hut Stricklin	King Racing	Ford	29.759	165.247
11	23	Jimmy Spencer	Travis Carter Enterprises	Ford	29.767	165.203
12	28	Dale Jarrett	Robert Yates Racing	Ford	29.771	165.181
13	18	Bobby Labonte	Joe Gibbs Racing	Chevrolet	29.803	165.004
14	87	Joe Nemechek	NEMCO Motorsports	Chevrolet	29.848	164.755
15	33	Robert Pressley (R)	Leo Jackson Motorsports	Chevrolet	29.870	164.633
16	5	Terry Labonte	Hendrick Motorsports	Chevrolet	29.884	164.556
17	41	Ricky Craven (R)	Larry Hedrick Motorsports	Chevrolet	29.885	164.551
18	17	Darrell Waltrip	Darrell Waltrip Motorsports	Chevrolet	29.887	164.540
19	71	Dave Marcis	Marcis Auto Racing	Chevrolet	29.887	164.540
20	31	Greg Sacks	A.G. Dillard Motorsports	Chevrolet	29.888	164.534
Failed to lock in Round 1
21	2	Rusty Wallace	Penske Racing South	Ford	29.642	165.900
22	43	Bobby Hamilton	Petty Enterprises	Pontiac	29.671	165.738
23	11	Brett Bodine	Junior Johnson & Associates	Ford	29.768	165.198
24	94	Bill Elliott	Elliott-Hardy Racing	Ford	29.780	165.131
25	30	Michael Waltrip	Bahari Racing	Pontiac	29.785	165.103
26	8	Jeff Burton	Stavola Brothers Racing	Ford	29.799	165.026
27	98	Jeremy Mayfield	Cale Yarborough Motorsports	Ford	29.810	164.965
28	16	Ted Musgrave	Roush Racing	Ford	29.819	164.915
29	90	Mike Wallace	Donlavey Racing	Ford	29.845	164.771
30	21	Morgan Shepherd	Wood Brothers Racing	Ford	29.852	164.733
31	12	Derrike Cope	Bobby Allison Motorsports	Ford	29.853	164.727
32	77	Bobby Hillin Jr.	Jasper Motorsports	Ford	29.899	164.474
33	19	Loy Allen Jr.	TriStar Motorsports	Ford	29.913	164.397
34	29	Steve Grissom	Diamond Ridge Motorsports	Chevrolet	29.914	164.391
35	27	Elton Sawyer	Junior Johnson & Associates	Ford	29.921	164.353
36	6	Mark Martin	Roush Racing	Ford	29.952	164.183
37	75	Todd Bodine	Butch Mock Motorsports	Ford	29.960	164.139
38	25	Ken Schrader	Hendrick Motorsports	Chevrolet	30.012	163.854
Provisionals
39	1	Rick Mast	Precision Products Racing	Ford	-*	-*
40	42	Kyle Petty	Team SABCO	Pontiac	-*	-*
41	40	Rich Bickle	Team SABCO	Pontiac	-*	-*
42	32	Ed Berrier	Active Motorsports	Chevrolet	-*	-*
Failed to qualify
43	66	Billy Standridge	Johnson Standridge Racing	Ford	-*	-*
44	52	Brad Teague	Jimmy Means Racing	Ford	-*	-*
45	88	Gary Bradberry	Bradberry Racing	Chevrolet	-*	-*
Official first round qualifying results
Official starting lineup

== Race results ==
Fin	St	#	Driver	Team	Make	Laps	Led	Status	Pts	Winnings
1	5	24	Jeff Gordon	Hendrick Motorsports	Chevrolet	367	54	running	180	$70,630
2	3	3	Dale Earnhardt	Richard Childress Racing	Chevrolet	367	208	running	180	$62,155
3	21	2	Rusty Wallace	Penske Racing South	Ford	367	9	running	170	$40,580
4	8	22	Ward Burton	Bill Davis Racing	Pontiac	367	1	running	165	$39,090
5	25	30	Michael Waltrip	Bahari Racing	Pontiac	367	1	running	160	$28,870
6	2	10	Ricky Rudd	Rudd Performance Motorsports	Ford	367	37	running	155	$34,865
7	10	26	Hut Stricklin	King Racing	Ford	367	0	running	146	$20,620
8	13	18	Bobby Labonte	Joe Gibbs Racing	Chevrolet	367	0	running	142	$27,700
9	7	9	Lake Speed	Melling Racing	Ford	367	0	running	138	$18,670
10	6	4	Sterling Marlin	Morgan–McClure Motorsports	Chevrolet	367	1	running	139	$29,580
11	30	21	Morgan Shepherd	Wood Brothers Racing	Ford	367	0	running	130	$22,740
12	1	37	John Andretti	Kranefuss-Haas Racing	Ford	367	41	running	132	$24,445
13	32	77	Bobby Hillin Jr.	Jasper Motorsports	Ford	366	0	running	124	$12,955
14	22	43	Bobby Hamilton	Petty Enterprises	Pontiac	365	0	running	121	$16,965
15	31	12	Derrike Cope	Bobby Allison Motorsports	Ford	363	0	running	118	$17,775
16	26	8	Jeff Burton	Stavola Brothers Racing	Ford	363	0	running	115	$21,405
17	15	33	Robert Pressley (R)	Leo Jackson Motorsports	Chevrolet	361	0	running	112	$22,535
18	17	41	Ricky Craven (R)	Larry Hedrick Motorsports	Chevrolet	361	0	running	109	$17,260
19	16	5	Terry Labonte	Hendrick Motorsports	Chevrolet	360	0	running	106	$26,680
20	42	32	Ed Berrier	Active Motorsports	Chevrolet	358	0	running	103	$15,460
21	41	40	Rich Bickle	Team SABCO	Pontiac	352	0	running	100	$16,375
22	28	16	Ted Musgrave	Roush Racing	Ford	350	0	engine	97	$19,855
23	38	25	Ken Schrader	Hendrick Motorsports	Chevrolet	349	0	running	94	$19,635
24	40	42	Kyle Petty	Team SABCO	Pontiac	347	0	running	91	$19,360
25	14	87	Joe Nemechek	NEMCO Motorsports	Chevrolet	342	0	running	88	$14,350
26	39	1	Rick Mast	Precision Products Racing	Ford	333	0	running	85	$18,890
27	34	29	Steve Grissom	Diamond Ridge Motorsports	Chevrolet	333	0	running	82	$13,680
28	12	28	Dale Jarrett	Robert Yates Racing	Ford	331	0	running	79	$24,870
29	11	23	Jimmy Spencer	Travis Carter Enterprises	Ford	325	0	running	76	$13,360
30	27	98	Jeremy Mayfield	Cale Yarborough Motorsports	Ford	322	0	running	73	$13,300
31	23	11	Brett Bodine	Junior Johnson & Associates	Ford	319	0	running	70	$23,115
32	35	27	Elton Sawyer	Junior Johnson & Associates	Ford	313	0	handling	67	$18,025
33	36	6	Mark Martin	Roush Racing	Ford	313	0	running	64	$23,960
34	33	19	Loy Allen Jr.	TriStar Motorsports	Ford	309	0	running	61	$9,925
35	9	7	Geoff Bodine	Geoff Bodine Racing	Ford	308	1	running	63	$24,415
36	4	15	Dick Trickle	Bud Moore Engineering	Ford	292	0	crash	55	$17,255
37	19	71	Dave Marcis	Marcis Auto Racing	Chevrolet	289	0	running	52	$9,691
38	20	31	Greg Sacks	A.G. Dillard Motorsports	Chevrolet	264	0	crash	49	$9,545
39	29	90	Mike Wallace	Donlavey Racing	Ford	264	0	engine	46	$9,545
40	18	17	Darrell Waltrip	Darrell Waltrip Motorsports	Chevrolet	263	0	crash	43	$14,545
41	24	94	Bill Elliott	Elliott-Hardy Racing	Ford	251	1	crash	45	$10,545
42	37	75	Todd Bodine	Butch Mock Motorsports	Ford	147	13	crash	42	$14,545
Official race results

Previous race: 1995 Goody's 500 (Bristol)	NASCAR Winston Cup Series; 1995 season	Next race: 1995 Miller Genuine Draft 400 (Richmond)
