= 1995 Food City 500 =

Sixth race of the 1996 NASCAR Winston Cup Series

Race details
- Race 6 of 31 in the 1995 NASCAR Winston Cup Series
- The 1995 Food City 500 program cover, featuring Dale Earnhardt. Artwork by Sam Bass.
- Date: April 2, 1995
- Official name: 35th Annual Food City 500
- Location: Bristol, Tennessee, Bristol Motor Speedway
- Course: Permanent racing facility
- Course length: 0.533 miles (0.858 km)
- Distance: 500 laps, 266.5 mi (428.89 km)
- Average speed: 92.011 miles per hour (148.077 km/h)
- Attendance: 76,000

Pole position
Driver	Mark Martin	Roush Racing
- Time: 15.399

Most laps led
Driver	Jeff Gordon	Hendrick Motorsports
- Laps: 205

Winner
No. 24	Jeff Gordon	Hendrick Motorsports

Television in the United States
- Network: ESPN
- Announcers: Bob Jenkins, Ned Jarrett, Benny Parsons

Radio in the United States
- Radio: Motor Racing Network

The 1995 Food City 500 was the sixth stock car race of the 1995 NASCAR Winston Cup Series and the 35th iteration of the event. The race was held on Saturday, April 2, 1995, in Bristol, Tennessee at Bristol Motor Speedway, a 0.533 miles (0.858 km) permanent oval-shaped racetrack. The race took the scheduled 500 laps to complete. At race's end, Hendrick Motorsports driver Jeff Gordon would manage to dominate the late stages of the race to take his fifth career NASCAR Winston Cup Series victory and his third victory of the season. To fill out the top three, Penske Racing South driver Rusty Wallace and owner-driver Darrell Waltrip would finish second and third, respectively.

== Background ==
The layout of Bristol Motor Speedway, the venue where the race was held.

The Bristol Motor Speedway, formerly known as Bristol International Raceway and Bristol Raceway, is a NASCAR short track venue located in Bristol, Tennessee. Constructed in 1960, it held its first NASCAR race on July 30, 1961. Despite its short length, Bristol is among the most popular tracks on the NASCAR schedule because of its distinct features, which include extraordinarily steep banking, an all concrete surface, two pit roads, and stadium-like seating. It has also been named one of the loudest NASCAR tracks.

=== Entry list ===
- (R) denotes rookie driver.

#	Driver	Team	Make
1	Rick Mast	Precision Products Racing	Pontiac
2	Rusty Wallace	Penske Racing South	Ford
3	Dale Earnhardt	Richard Childress Racing	Chevrolet
4	Sterling Marlin	Morgan–McClure Motorsports	Chevrolet
5	Terry Labonte	Hendrick Motorsports	Chevrolet
6	Mark Martin	Roush Racing	Ford
7	Geoff Bodine	Geoff Bodine Racing	Ford
8	Jeff Burton	Stavola Brothers Racing	Ford
9	Lake Speed	Melling Racing	Ford
10	Ricky Rudd	Rudd Performance Motorsports	Ford
11	Brett Bodine	Brett Bodine Racing	Ford
12	Derrike Cope	Bobby Allison Motorsports	Ford
15	Dick Trickle	Bud Moore Engineering	Ford
16	Ted Musgrave	Roush Racing	Ford
17	Darrell Waltrip	Darrell Waltrip Motorsports	Chevrolet
18	Bobby Labonte	Joe Gibbs Racing	Chevrolet
21	Morgan Shepherd	Wood Brothers Racing	Ford
22	Randy LaJoie (R)	Bill Davis Racing	Pontiac
23	Jimmy Spencer	Haas-Carter Motorsports	Ford
24	Jeff Gordon	Hendrick Motorsports	Chevrolet
25	Ken Schrader	Hendrick Motorsports	Chevrolet
26	Steve Kinser	King Racing	Ford
27	Loy Allen Jr.	Junior Johnson & Associates	Ford
28	Dale Jarrett	Robert Yates Racing	Ford
29	Steve Grissom	Diamond Ridge Motorsports	Chevrolet
30	Michael Waltrip	Bahari Racing	Pontiac
31	Ward Burton	A.G. Dillard Motorsports	Chevrolet
32	Chuck Bown	Active Motorsports	Chevrolet
33	Robert Pressley (R)	Leo Jackson Motorsports	Chevrolet
37	John Andretti	Kranefuss-Haas Racing	Ford
40	Greg Sacks	Dick Brooks Racing	Pontiac
41	Ricky Craven (R)	Larry Hedrick Motorsports	Chevrolet
42	Kyle Petty	Team SABCO	Pontiac
43	Bobby Hamilton	Petty Enterprises	Pontiac
47	Billy Standridge	Standridge Motorsports	Ford
52	Brad Teague	Jimmy Means Racing	Ford
66	Butch Miller	RaDiUs Motorsports	Ford
71	Dave Marcis	Marcis Auto Racing	Chevrolet
75	Todd Bodine	Butch Mock Motorsports	Ford
77	Davy Jones (R)	Jasper Motorsports	Ford
78	Hut Stricklin	Triad Motorsports	Ford
87	Joe Nemechek	NEMCO Motorsports	Chevrolet
90	Mike Wallace	Donlavey Racing	Ford
94	Bill Elliott	Elliott-Hardy Racing	Ford
98	Jeremy Mayfield	Cale Yarborough Motorsports	Ford

== Qualifying ==
Qualifying was split into two rounds. The first round was held on Friday, March 31, at 3:00 PM EST. Each driver would have one lap to set a time. During the first round, the top 20 drivers in the round would be guaranteed a starting spot in the race. If a driver was not able to guarantee a spot in the first round, they had the option to scrub their time from the first round and try and run a faster lap time in a second round qualifying run, held on Saturday, April 1, at 12:30 PM EST. As with the first round, each driver would have one lap to set a time. For this specific race, positions 21-32 would be decided on time, and depending on who needed it, a select amount of positions were given to cars who had not otherwise qualified but were high enough in owner's points; up to four provisionals were given. If needed, a past champion who did not qualify on either time or provisionals could use a champion's provisional, adding one more spot to the field.

Mark Martin, driving for Roush Racing, won the pole, setting a time of 15.399 and an average speed of 124.605 mph (200.532 km/h) in the first round.

Nine drivers would fail to qualify.

=== Full qualifying results ===
Pos.	#	Driver	Team	Make	Time	Speed
1	6	Mark Martin	Roush Racing	Ford	15.399	124.605
2	24	Jeff Gordon	Hendrick Motorsports	Chevrolet	15.419	124.444
3	42	Kyle Petty	Team SABCO	Pontiac	15.429	124.363
4	12	Derrike Cope	Bobby Allison Motorsports	Ford	15.442	124.259
5	18	Bobby Labonte	Joe Gibbs Racing	Chevrolet	15.442	124.259
6	16	Ted Musgrave	Roush Racing	Ford	15.479	123.961
7	41	Ricky Craven (R)	Larry Hedrick Motorsports	Chevrolet	15.495	123.833
8	37	John Andretti	Kranefuss-Haas Racing	Ford	15.506	123.746
9	2	Rusty Wallace	Penske Racing South	Ford	15.506	123.746
10	8	Jeff Burton	Stavola Brothers Racing	Ford	15.512	123.698
11	7	Geoff Bodine	Geoff Bodine Racing	Ford	15.532	123.539
12	17	Darrell Waltrip	Darrell Waltrip Motorsports	Chevrolet	15.533	123.531
13	10	Ricky Rudd	Rudd Performance Motorsports	Ford	15.559	123.324
14	11	Brett Bodine	Junior Johnson & Associates	Ford	15.563	123.292
15	40	Greg Sacks	Dick Brooks Racing	Pontiac	15.564	123.285
16	32	Chuck Bown	Active Motorsports	Chevrolet	15.567	123.261
17	43	Bobby Hamilton	Petty Enterprises	Pontiac	15.578	123.174
18	33	Robert Pressley (R)	Leo Jackson Motorsports	Chevrolet	15.585	123.118
19	28	Dale Jarrett	Robert Yates Racing	Ford	15.597	123.024
20	94	Bill Elliott	Elliott-Hardy Racing	Ford	15.599	123.008
Failed to lock in Round 1
21	5	Terry Labonte	Hendrick Motorsports	Chevrolet	15.567	123.261
22	15	Dick Trickle	Bud Moore Engineering	Ford	15.603	122.976
23	23	Jimmy Spencer	Travis Carter Enterprises	Ford	15.609	122.929
24	22	Randy LaJoie (R)	Bill Davis Racing	Pontiac	15.619	122.850
25	3	Dale Earnhardt	Richard Childress Racing	Chevrolet	15.624	122.811
26	77	Davy Jones (R)	Jasper Motorsports	Ford	15.634	122.733
27	25	Ken Schrader	Hendrick Motorsports	Chevrolet	15.640	122.685
28	9	Lake Speed	Melling Racing	Ford	15.641	122.678
29	75	Todd Bodine	Butch Mock Motorsports	Ford	15.654	122.576
30	1	Rick Mast	Precision Products Racing	Ford	15.662	122.513
31	4	Sterling Marlin	Morgan–McClure Motorsports	Chevrolet	15.665	122.490
32	21	Morgan Shepherd	Wood Brothers Racing	Ford	15.665	122.490
Provisionals
33	30	Michael Waltrip	Bahari Racing	Pontiac	-*	-*
34	29	Steve Grissom	Diamond Ridge Motorsports	Chevrolet	-*	-*
35	31	Ward Burton	A.G. Dillard Motorsports	Chevrolet	-*	-*
36	71	Dave Marcis	Marcis Auto Racing	Chevrolet	-*	-*
Failed to qualify
37	98	Jeremy Mayfield	Cale Yarborough Motorsports	Ford	-*	-*
38	87	Joe Nemechek	NEMCO Motorsports	Chevrolet	-*	-*
39	26	Steve Kinser	King Racing	Ford	-*	-*
40	47	Billy Standridge	Johnson Standridge Racing	Ford	-*	-*
41	78	Hut Stricklin	Triad Motorsports	Ford	-*	-*
42	66	Butch Miller	RaDiUs Motorsports	Ford	-*	-*
43	52	Brad Teague	Jimmy Means Racing	Ford	-*	-*
44	27	Loy Allen Jr.	Junior Johnson & Associates	Ford	-*	-*
45	90	Mike Wallace	Donlavey Racing	Ford	-*	-*
Official first round qualifying results
Official starting lineup

== Race results ==
Fin	St	#	Driver	Team	Make	Laps	Led	Status	Pts	Winnings
1	2	24	Jeff Gordon	Hendrick Motorsports	Chevrolet	500	205	running	185	$67,645
2	9	2	Rusty Wallace	Penske Racing South	Ford	500	101	running	175	$42,045
3	12	17	Darrell Waltrip	Darrell Waltrip Motorsports	Chevrolet	500	0	running	165	$35,845
4	17	43	Bobby Hamilton	Petty Enterprises	Pontiac	500	2	running	165	$28,631
5	13	10	Ricky Rudd	Rudd Performance Motorsports	Ford	500	0	running	155	$32,260
6	19	28	Dale Jarrett	Robert Yates Racing	Ford	500	0	running	150	$27,660
7	21	5	Terry Labonte	Hendrick Motorsports	Chevrolet	499	0	running	146	$28,060
8	1	6	Mark Martin	Roush Racing	Ford	499	155	running	147	$44,860
9	31	4	Sterling Marlin	Morgan–McClure Motorsports	Chevrolet	499	0	running	138	$25,055
10	18	33	Robert Pressley (R)	Leo Jackson Motorsports	Chevrolet	498	0	running	134	$24,605
11	34	29	Steve Grissom	Diamond Ridge Motorsports	Chevrolet	498	0	running	130	$17,955
12	24	22	Randy LaJoie (R)	Bill Davis Racing	Pontiac	497	0	running	127	$21,105
13	4	12	Derrike Cope	Bobby Allison Motorsports	Ford	496	0	running	124	$15,430
14	20	94	Bill Elliott	Elliott-Hardy Racing	Ford	496	0	running	121	$10,980
15	30	1	Rick Mast	Precision Products Racing	Ford	496	0	running	118	$20,530
16	23	23	Jimmy Spencer	Travis Carter Enterprises	Ford	495	0	running	115	$14,755
17	28	9	Lake Speed	Melling Racing	Ford	495	0	running	112	$10,705
18	6	16	Ted Musgrave	Roush Racing	Ford	495	0	running	109	$19,455
19	8	37	John Andretti	Kranefuss-Haas Racing	Ford	492	0	running	106	$10,645
20	32	21	Morgan Shepherd	Wood Brothers Racing	Ford	492	0	running	103	$20,536
21	35	31	Ward Burton	A.G. Dillard Motorsports	Chevrolet	489	0	running	100	$10,380
22	33	30	Michael Waltrip	Bahari Racing	Pontiac	489	0	running	97	$18,930
23	11	7	Geoff Bodine	Geoff Bodine Racing	Ford	488	0	running	94	$24,980
24	26	77	Davy Jones (R)	Jasper Motorsports	Ford	486	0	running	91	$13,705
25	25	3	Dale Earnhardt	Richard Childress Racing	Chevrolet	479	0	running	88	$36,360
26	27	25	Ken Schrader	Hendrick Motorsports	Chevrolet	475	0	running	85	$18,530
27	14	11	Brett Bodine	Junior Johnson & Associates	Ford	460	0	running	82	$23,106
28	10	8	Jeff Burton	Stavola Brothers Racing	Ford	413	0	running	79	$18,355
29	7	41	Ricky Craven (R)	Larry Hedrick Motorsports	Chevrolet	407	0	running	76	$13,225
30	22	15	Dick Trickle	Bud Moore Engineering	Ford	407	0	running	73	$17,800
31	16	32	Chuck Bown	Active Motorsports	Chevrolet	395	0	running	70	$12,200
32	5	18	Bobby Labonte	Joe Gibbs Racing	Chevrolet	393	0	running	67	$16,700
33	29	75	Todd Bodine	Butch Mock Motorsports	Ford	392	0	running	64	$16,200
34	36	71	Dave Marcis	Marcis Auto Racing	Chevrolet	354	0	running	61	$9,200
35	3	42	Kyle Petty	Team SABCO	Pontiac	276	37	crash	63	$14,000
36	15	40	Greg Sacks	Dick Brooks Racing	Pontiac	212	0	engine	55	$13,700
Official race results

Previous race: 1995 TranSouth Financial 400	NASCAR Winston Cup Series; 1995 season	Next race: 1995 First Union 400
