= Jay Hedgecock =

American racing driver

- Born: February 28, 1955 (age 71); High Point, North Carolina, U.S.

NASCAR Cup Series career
- 3 races run over 2 years
- Best finish: 58th (1994)
- First race: 1993 Tyson/Holly Farms 400 (North Wilkesboro)
- Last race: 1994 Hanes 500 (Martinsville)
Wins	Top tens	Poles
0	0	0

NASCAR O'Reilly Auto Parts Series career
- 15 races run over 3 years
- Best finish: 32nd (1983)
- First race: 1982 Dogwood 500 (Martinsville)
- Last race: 1984 Hampton 200 (Langley)
Wins	Top tens	Poles
0	2	0
- Statistics up to date as of October 12, 2024.

Jay Hedgecock (born February 28, 1955) is an American former professional stock car racing driver who has previously competed in the NASCAR Winston Cup Series, the NASCAR Busch Grand National Series, the NASCAR Whelen Modified Tour, and the now defunct NASCAR Whelen Southern Modified Tour.

Hedgecock is a well known chassis builder, operating a company that manufactures cars and components for a wide range of competitors.

Hedgecock has also competed in the SMART Modified Tour, where he won the championship in 1990 and 1992, the USAR Hooters Late Model Series, and the World Series of Asphalt Stock Car Racing.

== Motorsports career results ==
=== NASCAR ===
(key) (Bold - Pole position awarded by qualifying time. Italics - Pole position earned by points standings or practice time. * – Most laps led.)

==== Winston Cup Series ====
NASCAR Winston Cup Series results
Year	Team	No.	Make	1	2	3	4	5	6	7	8	9	10	11	12	13	14	15	16	17	18	19	20	21	22	23	24	25	26	27	28	29	30	31	NWCC	Pts	Ref
1993	Triad Motorsports	78	Ford	DAY	CAR	RCH	ATL	DAR	BRI	NWS; DNQ	MAR	TAL	SON	CLT	DOV	POC	MCH	DAY	NHA	POC; DNQ	TAL	GLN	MCH	BRI	DAR	RCH	DOV	MAR	NWS; 26	CLT	CAR	PHO	ATL		72nd	85	
1994	Triad Motorsports	78	Ford	DAY	CAR	RCH	ATL	DAR	BRI	NWS; 36	MAR; 25	TAL	SON	CLT	DOV	POC	MCH	DAY	NHA	POC	TAL	IND	GLN	MCH	BRI	DAR	RCH	DOV	MAR	NWS	CLT	CAR	PHO	ATL	58th	143	
1995	Triad Motorsports	78	Ford	DAY	CAR	RCH; DNQ	ATL	DAR	BRI	NWS; DNQ	MAR; DNQ	TAL	SON	CLT	DOV	POC	MCH	DAY	NHA	POC	TAL	IND	GLN	MCH	BRI	DAR	RCH; DNQ	DOV	MAR	NWS; DNQ	CLT	CAR; DNQ	PHO	ATL	N/A	0	

==== Busch Series ====
NASCAR Busch Series results
Year	Team	No.	Make	1	2	3	4	5	6	7	8	9	10	11	12	13	14	15	16	17	18	19	20	21	22	23	24	25	26	27	28	29	30	31	32	33	34	35	NBSC	Pts	Ref
1982	N/A	0	Pontiac	DAY	RCH	BRI	MAR; 25	DAR	HCY	SBO	CRW	RCH	LGY	DOV	HCY																								82nd	304	
1982	N/A	31	Pontiac													CLT; 34	ASH	HCY	SBO	CAR	CRW	SBO	HCY	LGY	IRP	BRI	HCY												82nd	304	
1982	N/A	N/A	N/A																									RCH; 19	MAR	CLT	HCY								82nd	304	
1982	N/A	59	Pontiac																													MAR; 38							82nd	304	
1983	N/A	88	Pontiac	DAY	RCH	CAR	HCY	MAR	NWS	SBO	GPS	LGY	DOV	BRI	CLT	SBO; 21	HCY	ROU	SBO	ROU; 19	CRW	ROU; 21	SBO; 12	HCY	LGY	IRP	GPS	BRI	HCY	DAR	RCH; 26	NWS	SBO	MAR; 27	ROU	CLT	HCY	MAR; 6	32nd	750	
1984	N/A	88	Pontiac	DAY	RCH; 24	CAR	HCY	MAR; 10	DAR	ROU; 15	NSV	LGY; 18	MLW	DOV	CLT	SBO	HCY	ROU	SBO	ROU	HCY	IRP	LGY	SBO	BRI	DAR	RCH	NWS	CLT	HCY	CAR	MAR							45th	452	

==== Whelen Southern Modified Tour ====
NASCAR Whelen Southern Modified Tour results
Year	Car owner	No.	Make	1	2	3	4	5	6	7	8	9	10	11	12	13	14	NSWMTC	Pts	Ref
2005	David Pinnix	41	Dodge	CRW; 17	**CRW**; 13	**CRW**; 4	**CRW**; 8*	BGS; 4*	MAR; 5	ACE; 7	ACE; 14	CRW; 6	**CRW**; 14*	DUB; 18	ACE; 1**			6th	1680	
2006	David Pinnix	41	Dodge	CRW; 9	GRE; 9	CRW; 11	DUB; 21	CRW; 18	BGS; 22	MAR	CRW	ACE	CRW	HCY	DUB	SNM		20th	712	
2009	Gary Myers	12	Ford	CON	SBO	CRW	LAN	CRW	BGS	BRI	CRW	MBS	CRW	CRW	MAR	ACE	CRW; 13	38th	124	
