= 1991 First Union 400 =

Seventh race of the 1991 NASCAR Winston Cup Series

Race details
- Race 7 of 29 in the 1991 NASCAR Winston Cup Series
- The 1991 First Union 400 program cover, featuring Brett Bodine.
- Date: April 21, 1991
- Official name: 41st Annual First Union 400
- Location: North Wilkesboro Speedway, North Wilkesboro, North Carolina
- Course: Permanent racing facility
- Course length: 0.625 miles (1.006 km)
- Distance: 400 laps, 250 mi (402.336 km)
- Scheduled distance: 400 laps, 250 mi (402.336 km)
- Average speed: 79.604 miles per hour (128.110 km/h)
- Attendance: 41,500

Pole position
Driver	Brett Bodine	King Racing
- Time: 19.357

Most laps led
Driver	Brett Bodine	King Racing
- Laps: 103

Winner
No. 17	Darrell Waltrip	Darrell Waltrip Motorsports

Television in the United States
- Network: ESPN
- Announcers: Bob Jenkins, Ned Jarrett, Benny Parsons

Radio in the United States
- Radio: Motor Racing Network

The 1991 First Union 400 was the seventh stock car race of the 1991 NASCAR Winston Cup Series and the 41st iteration of the event. The race was held on Sunday, April 21, 1991, before an audience of 41,500 in North Wilkesboro, North Carolina at the North Wilkesboro Speedway, a 0.625 miles (1.006 km) oval short track. The race took the scheduled 400 laps to complete. At race's end, owner-driver Darrell Waltrip would manage to get his car away from the chaotic nature of the race, leading the final 52 laps to take his 80th career NASCAR Winston Cup Series victory and his first victory of the season. To fill out the top three, Richard Childress Racing driver Dale Earnhardt and Travis Carter Enterprises driver Jimmy Spencer would finish second and third, respectively.

== Background ==
The layout of North Wilkesboro Speedway, the venue where the race was held.

North Wilkesboro Speedway is a short oval racetrack located on U.S. Route 421, about five miles east of the town of North Wilkesboro, North Carolina, or 80 miles north of Charlotte. It measures 0.625 mi (1.006 km) and features a unique uphill backstretch and downhill frontstretch. It has previously held races in NASCAR's top three series, including 93 Winston Cup Series races. The track, a NASCAR original, operated from 1949, NASCAR's inception, until the track's original closure in 1996. The speedway briefly reopened in 2010 and hosted several stock car series races before closing again in the spring of 2011. It was re-opened in August 2022 for grassroots racing.

=== Entry list ===
- (R) denotes rookie driver.

#	Driver	Team	Make
1	Rick Mast	Precision Products Racing	Oldsmobile
2	Rusty Wallace	Penske Racing South	Pontiac
3	Dale Earnhardt	Richard Childress Racing	Chevrolet
4	Ernie Irvan	Morgan–McClure Motorsports	Chevrolet
5	Ricky Rudd	Hendrick Motorsports	Chevrolet
6	Mark Martin	Roush Racing	Ford
7	Alan Kulwicki	AK Racing	Ford
8	Rick Wilson	Stavola Brothers Racing	Buick
9	Bill Elliott	Melling Racing	Ford
10	Derrike Cope	Whitcomb Racing	Chevrolet
11	Geoff Bodine	Junior Johnson & Associates	Ford
12	Hut Stricklin	Bobby Allison Motorsports	Buick
15	Morgan Shepherd	Bud Moore Engineering	Ford
17	Darrell Waltrip	Darrell Waltrip Motorsports	Chevrolet
19	Chad Little	Little Racing	Ford
20	Bobby Hillin Jr.	Moroso Racing	Oldsmobile
21	Dale Jarrett	Wood Brothers Racing	Ford
22	Sterling Marlin*	Junior Johnson & Associates	Ford
24	Mickey Gibbs	Team III Racing	Pontiac
25	Ken Schrader	Hendrick Motorsports	Chevrolet
26	Brett Bodine	King Racing	Buick
28	Davey Allison	Robert Yates Racing	Ford
30	Michael Waltrip	Bahari Racing	Pontiac
33	Harry Gant	Leo Jackson Motorsports	Oldsmobile
34	Dick Trickle	AAG Racing	Buick
41	Larry Pearson	Larry Hedrick Motorsports	Chevrolet
42	Kyle Petty	SABCO Racing	Pontiac
43	Richard Petty	Petty Enterprises	Pontiac
44	Irv Hoerr	Labonte Motorsports	Oldsmobile
47	Rich Bickle	Close Racing	Oldsmobile
51	Jeff Purvis (R)	Phoenix Racing	Oldsmobile
52	Jimmy Means	Jimmy Means Racing	Pontiac
55	Ted Musgrave (R)	U.S. Racing	Pontiac
66	Lake Speed	Cale Yarborough Motorsports	Pontiac
68	Bobby Hamilton (R)	TriStar Motorsports	Oldsmobile
70	J. D. McDuffie	McDuffie Racing	Pontiac
71	Dave Marcis	Marcis Auto Racing	Chevrolet
75	Joe Ruttman	RahMoc Enterprises	Oldsmobile
76	Bill Sedgwick	Spears Motorsports	Chevrolet
94	Terry Labonte	Hagan Racing	Oldsmobile
98	Jimmy Spencer	Travis Carter Enterprises	Chevrolet

*After sustaining burns in a crash at the 1991 Valleydale Meats 500, Sterling Marlin would be replaced by relief driver Charlie Glotzbach for qualifying. During the race, Marlin would manage to start the race, before being replaced by Glotzbach one lap into the race. As a result of starting the race, Marlin is credited with the finish.

== Qualifying ==
Qualifying was originally scheduled to be split into two rounds. The first round was scheduled to be held on Friday, April 19, at 3:00 PM EST. However, due to fog, the first round was cancelled, and qualifying was condensed into one round, which was held on Saturday, April 20, at 12:15 AM EST. Each driver would have one lap to set a time. For this specific race, positions 1–30 would be decided on time, and depending on who needed it, a select amount of positions were given to cars who had not otherwise qualified but were high enough in owner's points; up to two provisionals were given. If needed, a past champion who did not qualify on either time or provisionals could use a champion's provisional, adding one more spot to the field.

Brett Bodine, driving for King Racing, would win the pole, setting a time of 19.357 and an average speed of 116.237 miles per hour (187.065 km/h).

Eight drivers would fail to qualify.

=== Full qualifying results ===
Pos.	#	Driver	Team	Make	Time	Speed
1	26	Brett Bodine	King Racing	Buick	19.357	116.237
2	7	Alan Kulwicki	AK Racing	Ford	19.368	116.171
3	42	Kyle Petty	SABCO Racing	Pontiac	19.403	115.961
4	33	Harry Gant	Leo Jackson Motorsports	Oldsmobile	19.433	115.782
5	2	Rusty Wallace	Penske Racing South	Pontiac	19.434	115.776
6	21	Dale Jarrett	Wood Brothers Racing	Ford	19.457	115.640
7	1	Rick Mast	Precision Products Racing	Oldsmobile	19.485	115.473
8	11	Geoff Bodine	Junior Johnson & Associates	Ford	19.490	115.444
9	25	Ken Schrader	Hendrick Motorsports	Chevrolet	19.503	115.367
10	75	Joe Ruttman	RahMoc Enterprises	Oldsmobile	19.525	115.237
11	5	Ricky Rudd	Hendrick Motorsports	Chevrolet	19.529	115.213
12	66	Lake Speed	Cale Yarborough Motorsports	Pontiac	19.544	115.125
13	17	Darrell Waltrip	Darrell Waltrip Motorsports	Chevrolet	19.548	115.101
14	98	Jimmy Spencer	Travis Carter Enterprises	Chevrolet	19.559	115.037
15	12	Hut Stricklin	Bobby Allison Motorsports	Buick	19.564	115.007
16	34	Dick Trickle	AAG Racing	Buick	19.566	114.995
17	3	Dale Earnhardt	Richard Childress Racing	Chevrolet	19.581	114.907
18	10	Derrike Cope	Whitcomb Racing	Chevrolet	19.581	114.907
19	24	Mickey Gibbs	Team III Racing	Pontiac	19.584	114.890
20	6	Mark Martin	Roush Racing	Ford	19.585	114.884
21	30	Michael Waltrip	Bahari Racing	Pontiac	19.591	114.849
22	4	Ernie Irvan	Morgan–McClure Motorsports	Chevrolet	19.611	114.732
23	71	Dave Marcis	Marcis Auto Racing	Chevrolet	19.640	114.562
24	8	Rick Wilson	Stavola Brothers Racing	Buick	19.652	114.492
25	20	Bobby Hillin Jr.	Moroso Racing	Oldsmobile	19.664	114.422
26	28	Davey Allison	Robert Yates Racing	Ford	19.690	114.271
27	68	Bobby Hamilton (R)	TriStar Motorsports	Pontiac	19.695	114.242
28	55	Ted Musgrave (R)	U.S. Racing	Pontiac	19.707	114.173
29	15	Morgan Shepherd	Bud Moore Engineering	Ford	19.710	114.155
30	94	Terry Labonte	Hagan Racing	Oldsmobile	19.716	114.121
Provisionals
31	22	Charlie Glotzbach	Junior Johnson & Associates	Ford	20.005	112.472
32	9	Bill Elliott	Melling Racing	Ford	19.738	113.993
Champion's Provisional
33	43	Richard Petty	Petty Enterprises	Pontiac	19.761	113.861
Failed to qualify
34	19	Chad Little	Little Racing	Ford	-*	-*
35	52	Jimmy Means	Jimmy Means Racing	Pontiac	-*	-*
36	70	J. D. McDuffie	McDuffie Racing	Pontiac	-*	-*
37	47	Rich Bickle	Close Racing	Oldsmobile	-*	-*
38	41	Larry Pearson	Larry Hedrick Motorsports	Chevrolet	-*	-*
39	51	Jeff Purvis (R)	Phoenix Racing	Oldsmobile	-*	-*
40	76	Bill Sedgwick	Spears Motorsports	Chevrolet	-*	-*
41	44	Irv Hoerr	Labonte Motorsports	Oldsmobile	-*	-*
Official starting lineup

== Race results ==
Fin	St	#	Driver	Team	Make	Laps	Led	Status	Pts	Winnings
1	13	17	Darrell Waltrip	Darrell Waltrip Motorsports	Chevrolet	400	52	running	180	$53,800
2	17	3	Dale Earnhardt	Richard Childress Racing	Chevrolet	400	19	running	175	$35,225
3	14	98	Jimmy Spencer	Travis Carter Enterprises	Chevrolet	400	70	running	170	$20,350
4	29	15	Morgan Shepherd	Bud Moore Engineering	Ford	400	0	running	160	$16,450
5	9	25	Ken Schrader	Hendrick Motorsports	Chevrolet	400	37	running	160	$14,725
6	26	28	Davey Allison	Robert Yates Racing	Ford	400	0	running	150	$13,875
7	21	30	Michael Waltrip	Bahari Racing	Pontiac	400	0	running	146	$9,280
8	32	9	Bill Elliott	Melling Racing	Ford	400	0	running	142	$11,800
9	20	6	Mark Martin	Roush Racing	Ford	400	0	running	138	$12,450
10	22	4	Ernie Irvan	Morgan–McClure Motorsports	Chevrolet	400	23	running	139	$13,830
11	11	5	Ricky Rudd	Hendrick Motorsports	Chevrolet	399	0	running	130	$10,175
12	7	1	Rick Mast	Precision Products Racing	Oldsmobile	399	0	running	127	$7,575
13	12	66	Lake Speed	Cale Yarborough Motorsports	Pontiac	399	0	running	124	$7,300
14	15	12	Hut Stricklin	Bobby Allison Motorsports	Buick	398	0	running	121	$6,950
15	18	10	Derrike Cope	Whitcomb Racing	Chevrolet	397	0	running	118	$11,500
16	33	43	Richard Petty	Petty Enterprises	Pontiac	397	0	running	115	$6,550
17	28	55	Ted Musgrave (R)	U.S. Racing	Pontiac	397	0	running	112	$5,625
18	3	42	Kyle Petty	SABCO Racing	Pontiac	396	0	running	109	$9,250
19	23	71	Dave Marcis	Marcis Auto Racing	Chevrolet	395	0	running	106	$6,200
20	25	20	Bobby Hillin Jr.	Moroso Racing	Oldsmobile	394	0	running	103	$5,450
21	27	68	Bobby Hamilton (R)	TriStar Motorsports	Pontiac	392	0	running	100	$3,600
22	31	22	Sterling Marlin	Junior Johnson & Associates	Ford	388	0	running	97	$3,300
23	4	33	Harry Gant	Leo Jackson Motorsports	Oldsmobile	388	66	running	99	$7,125
24	10	75	Joe Ruttman	RahMoc Enterprises	Oldsmobile	378	0	running	91	$5,525
25	6	21	Dale Jarrett	Wood Brothers Racing	Ford	369	0	crash	88	$5,500
26	16	34	Dick Trickle	AAG Racing	Buick	369	0	crash	85	$3,100
27	24	8	Rick Wilson	Stavola Brothers Racing	Buick	339	0	crash	82	$5,200
28	8	11	Geoff Bodine	Junior Johnson & Associates	Ford	333	0	flagged	79	$10,485
29	2	7	Alan Kulwicki	AK Racing	Ford	323	0	crash	76	$8,675
30	1	26	Brett Bodine	King Racing	Buick	218	103	crash	83	$15,300
31	30	94	Terry Labonte	Hagan Racing	Oldsmobile	207	0	engine	70	$5,000
32	5	2	Rusty Wallace	Penske Racing South	Pontiac	192	30	crash	72	$2,925
33	19	24	Mickey Gibbs	Team III Racing	Pontiac	110	0	header	64	$2,500
Official race results

== Standings after the race ==
Drivers' Championship standings

	Pos	Driver	Points
	1	Ricky Rudd	1,103
1	2	Dale Earnhardt	1,006 (-97)
1	3	Ernie Irvan	993 (-110)
	4	Mark Martin	951 (–152)
2	5	Darrell Waltrip	941 (–162)
	6	Morgan Shepherd	938 (–165)
2	7	Ken Schrader	911 (–192)
	8	Davey Allison	908 (–195)
3	9	Michael Waltrip	882 (–221)
5	10	Rusty Wallace	877 (–226)
Official driver's standings

- Note: Only the first 10 positions are included for the driver standings.

Previous race: 1991 Valleydale Meats 500	NASCAR Winston Cup Series; 1991 season	Next race: 1991 Hanes 500
