= 1991 Hanes 500 =

Eighth race of the 1991 NASCAR Winston Cup Series

Race details
- Race 8 of 29 in the 1991 NASCAR Winston Cup Series
- The 1991 Hanes 500 program cover, featuring Geoff Bodine.
- Date: April 28, 1991
- Official name: 42nd Annual Hanes 500
- Location: Martinsville, Virginia, Martinsville Speedway
- Course: Permanent racing facility
- Course length: 0.526 miles (0.847 km)
- Distance: 500 laps, 263 mi (423.257 km)
- Scheduled distance: 500 laps, 263 mi (423.257 km)
- Average speed: 75.139 miles per hour (120.924 km/h)
- Attendance: 44,000

Pole position
Driver	Mark Martin	Roush Racing
- Time: 20.594

Most laps led
Driver	Dale Earnhardt	Richard Childress Racing
- Laps: 251

Winner
No. 3	Dale Earnhardt	Richard Childress Racing

Television in the United States
- Network: ESPN
- Announcers: Bob Jenkins, Ned Jarrett, Benny Parsons

Radio in the United States
- Radio: Motor Racing Network

The 1991 Hanes 500 was the eighth stock car race of the 1991 NASCAR Winston Cup Series and the 42nd iteration of the event. The race was held on Sunday, April 28, 1991, before an audience of 44,000 in Martinsville, Virginia at Martinsville Speedway, a 0.526 miles (0.847 km) permanent oval-shaped short track. The race took the scheduled 500 laps to complete. With the assist of a late caution, on the final restart with 38 laps to go in the race, Richard Childress Racing driver Dale Earnhardt would manage to mount a late-race charge to the lead on the ensuing restart to take his 50th career NASCAR Winston Cup Series victory and his second victory of the season. To fill out the top three, SABCO Racing driver Kyle Petty and owner-driver Darrell Waltrip would finish second and third, respectively.

== Background ==
The layout of Martinsville Speedway, the venue where the race was held.

Martinsville Speedway is a NASCAR-owned stock car racing track located in Henry County, in Ridgeway, Virginia, just to the south of Martinsville. At 0.526 miles (0.847 km) in length, it is the shortest track in the NASCAR Cup Series. The track was also one of the first paved oval tracks in NASCAR, being built in 1947 by H. Clay Earles. It is also the only remaining race track that has been on the NASCAR circuit from its beginning in 1948.

=== Entry list ===
- (R) denotes rookie driver.

#	Driver	Team	Make
1	Rick Mast	Precision Products Racing	Oldsmobile
2	Rusty Wallace	Penske Racing South	Pontiac
3	Dale Earnhardt	Richard Childress Racing	Chevrolet
4	Ernie Irvan	Morgan–McClure Motorsports	Chevrolet
5	Ricky Rudd	Hendrick Motorsports	Chevrolet
6	Mark Martin	Roush Racing	Ford
7	Alan Kulwicki	AK Racing	Ford
8	Rick Wilson	Stavola Brothers Racing	Buick
9	Bill Elliott	Melling Racing	Ford
10	Derrike Cope	Whitcomb Racing	Chevrolet
11	Geoff Bodine	Junior Johnson & Associates	Ford
12	Hut Stricklin	Bobby Allison Motorsports	Buick
15	Morgan Shepherd	Bud Moore Engineering	Ford
17	Darrell Waltrip	Darrell Waltrip Motorsports	Chevrolet
19	Chad Little	Little Racing	Ford
20	Bobby Hillin Jr.	Moroso Racing	Oldsmobile
21	Dale Jarrett	Wood Brothers Racing	Ford
22	Sterling Marlin	Junior Johnson & Associates	Ford
24	Mickey Gibbs	Team III Racing	Pontiac
25	Ken Schrader	Hendrick Motorsports	Chevrolet
26	Brett Bodine	King Racing	Buick
28	Davey Allison	Robert Yates Racing	Ford
30	Michael Waltrip	Bahari Racing	Pontiac
33	Harry Gant	Leo Jackson Motorsports	Oldsmobile
34	Dick Trickle	AAG Racing	Buick
42	Kyle Petty	SABCO Racing	Pontiac
43	Richard Petty	Petty Enterprises	Pontiac
52	Jimmy Means	Jimmy Means Racing	Pontiac
55	Ted Musgrave (R)	U.S. Racing	Pontiac
66	Lake Speed	Cale Yarborough Motorsports	Pontiac
68	Bobby Hamilton (R)	TriStar Motorsports	Oldsmobile
70	J. D. McDuffie	McDuffie Racing	Pontiac
71	Dave Marcis	Marcis Auto Racing	Chevrolet
75	Joe Ruttman	RahMoc Enterprises	Oldsmobile
76	Bill Sedgwick	Spears Motorsports	Chevrolet
94	Terry Labonte	Hagan Racing	Oldsmobile
98	Jimmy Spencer	Travis Carter Enterprises	Chevrolet

== Qualifying ==
Qualifying was originally scheduled to be split into two rounds. The first round was held on Friday, April 27, at 3:00 PM EST. Originally, the first 20 positions were going to be determined by first round qualifying, with positions 21-30 meant to be determined the following day on Saturday, April 28. However, due to rain, the second round was cancelled. As a result, the rest of the starting lineup was set using the results from the first round. Depending on who needed it, a select amount of positions were given to cars who had not otherwise qualified but were high enough in owner's points; up to two were given. If needed, a past champion who did not qualify on either time or provisionals could use a champion's provisional, adding one more spot to the field.

Mark Martin, driving for Roush Racing, would win the pole, setting a time of 20.594 and an average speed of 91.949 miles per hour (147.978 km/h).

Five drivers would fail to qualify.

=== Full qualifying results ===
Pos.	#	Driver	Team	Make	Time	Speed
1	6	Mark Martin	Roush Racing	Ford	20.594	91.949
2	33	Harry Gant	Leo Jackson Motorsports	Oldsmobile	20.647	91.713
3	25	Ken Schrader	Hendrick Motorsports	Chevrolet	20.656	91.673
4	1	Rick Mast	Precision Products Racing	Oldsmobile	20.690	91.522
5	2	Rusty Wallace	Penske Racing South	Pontiac	20.725	91.368
6	19	Chad Little	Little Racing	Ford	20.787	91.095
7	21	Dale Jarrett	Wood Brothers Racing	Ford	20.817	90.964
8	7	Alan Kulwicki	AK Racing	Ford	20.840	90.864
9	4	Ernie Irvan	Morgan–McClure Motorsports	Chevrolet	20.853	90.807
10	3	Dale Earnhardt	Richard Childress Racing	Chevrolet	20.890	90.646
11	20	Bobby Hillin Jr.	Moroso Racing	Oldsmobile	20.900	90.603
12	43	Richard Petty	Petty Enterprises	Pontiac	20.900	90.603
13	94	Terry Labonte	Hagan Racing	Oldsmobile	20.922	90.508
14	9	Bill Elliott	Melling Racing	Ford	20.945	90.408
15	26	Brett Bodine	King Racing	Buick	20.952	90.378
16	17	Darrell Waltrip	Darrell Waltrip Motorsports	Chevrolet	20.958	90.352
17	42	Kyle Petty	SABCO Racing	Pontiac	20.969	90.305
18	11	Geoff Bodine	Junior Johnson & Associates	Ford	20.972	90.292
19	75	Joe Ruttman	RahMoc Enterprises	Oldsmobile	20.973	90.288
20	76	Bill Sedgwick	Spears Motorsports	Chevrolet	21.009	90.133
21	12	Hut Stricklin	Bobby Allison Motorsports	Buick	21.027	90.056
22	5	Ricky Rudd	Hendrick Motorsports	Chevrolet	21.030	90.043
23	22	Sterling Marlin	Hendrick Motorsports	Ford	21.050	89.957
24	34	Dick Trickle	AAG Racing	Buick	21.056	89.932
25	24	Mickey Gibbs	Team III Racing	Pontiac	21.065	89.893
26	28	Davey Allison	Robert Yates Racing	Ford	21.115	89.680
27	66	Lake Speed	Cale Yarborough Motorsports	Pontiac	21.123	89.646
28	98	Jimmy Spencer	Travis Carter Enterprises	Chevrolet	21.126	89.634
29	30	Michael Waltrip	Bahari Racing	Pontiac	21.148	89.540
30	55	Ted Musgrave (R)	U.S. Racing	Pontiac	21.212	89.270
Provisionals
31	15	Morgan Shepherd	Bud Moore Engineering	Ford	21.254	89.094
32	8	Rick Wilson	Stavola Brothers Racing	Buick	21.225	89.216
Failed to qualify
33	10	Derrike Cope	Whitcomb Racing	Chevrolet	21.241	89.148
34	68	Bobby Hamilton (R)	TriStar Motorsports	Oldsmobile	21.255	89.090
35	71	Dave Marcis	Marcis Auto Racing	Chevrolet	21.339	88.739
36	52	Jimmy Means	Jimmy Means Racing	Pontiac	21.416	88.420
37	70	J. D. McDuffie	McDuffie Racing	Pontiac	-	-
Official first round qualifying results
Official starting lineup

== Race results ==
Fin	St	#	Driver	Team	Make	Laps	Led	Status	Pts	Winnings
1	10	3	Dale Earnhardt	Richard Childress Racing	Chevrolet	500	251	running	185	$63,600
2	17	42	Kyle Petty	SABCO Racing	Pontiac	500	10	running	175	$29,625
3	16	17	Darrell Waltrip	Darrell Waltrip Motorsports	Chevrolet	500	0	running	165	$16,150
4	15	26	Brett Bodine	King Racing	Buick	500	0	running	160	$15,550
5	2	33	Harry Gant	Leo Jackson Motorsports	Oldsmobile	499	129	running	160	$17,625
6	28	98	Jimmy Spencer	Travis Carter Enterprises	Chevrolet	499	0	running	150	$12,350
7	29	30	Michael Waltrip	Bahari Racing	Pontiac	499	0	running	146	$11,100
8	26	28	Davey Allison	Robert Yates Racing	Ford	499	110	running	147	$16,350
9	8	7	Alan Kulwicki	AK Racing	Ford	497	0	running	138	$12,500
10	21	12	Hut Stricklin	Bobby Allison Motorsports	Buick	496	0	running	134	$13,000
11	22	5	Ricky Rudd	Hendrick Motorsports	Chevrolet	496	0	running	130	$10,985
12	7	21	Dale Jarrett	Wood Brothers Racing	Ford	495	0	running	127	$7,900
13	4	1	Rick Mast	Precision Products Racing	Oldsmobile	495	0	running	124	$8,200
14	12	43	Richard Petty	Petty Enterprises	Pontiac	495	0	running	121	$7,500
15	9	4	Ernie Irvan	Morgan–McClure Motorsports	Chevrolet	491	0	running	118	$10,950
16	19	75	Joe Ruttman	RahMoc Enterprises	Oldsmobile	487	0	running	115	$7,200
17	11	20	Bobby Hillin Jr.	Moroso Racing	Oldsmobile	487	0	running	112	$5,400
18	27	66	Lake Speed	Cale Yarborough Motorsports	Pontiac	487	0	running	109	$7,355
19	20	76	Bill Sedgwick	Spears Motorsports	Chevrolet	466	0	running	106	$3,700
20	18	11	Geoff Bodine	Junior Johnson & Associates	Ford	460	0	transmission	103	$12,000
21	5	2	Rusty Wallace	Penske Racing South	Pontiac	458	0	transmission	100	$3,750
22	32	8	Rick Wilson	Stavola Brothers Racing	Buick	453	0	running	97	$5,650
23	3	25	Ken Schrader	Hendrick Motorsports	Chevrolet	444	0	running	94	$6,525
24	30	55	Ted Musgrave (R)	U.S. Racing	Pontiac	442	0	running	91	$5,175
25	25	24	Mickey Gibbs	Team III Racing	Pontiac	414	0	running	88	$3,250
26	14	9	Bill Elliott	Melling Racing	Ford	411	0	running	85	$9,750
27	6	19	Chad Little	Little Racing	Ford	408	0	running	82	$3,650
28	23	22	Sterling Marlin	Bill Davis Racing	Ford	402	0	running	79	$2,900
29	1	6	Mark Martin	Roush Racing	Ford	293	0	overheating	76	$13,500
30	31	15	Morgan Shepherd	Bud Moore Engineering	Ford	276	0	transmission	73	$9,450
31	13	94	Terry Labonte	Hagan Racing	Oldsmobile	126	0	overheating	70	$4,850
32	24	34	Dick Trickle	AAG Racing	Buick	12	0	overheating	67	$2,750
Official race results

== Standings after the race ==
Drivers' Championship standings

	Pos	Driver	Points
	1	Ricky Rudd	1,233
	2	Dale Earnhardt	1,191 (-42)
	3	Ernie Irvan	1,111 (-122)
1	4	Darrell Waltrip	1,106 (–127)
3	5	Davey Allison	1,055 (–178)
3	6	Michael Waltrip	1,028 (–205)
3	7	Mark Martin	1,027 (–206)
2	8	Morgan Shepherd	1,011 (–222)
2	9	Ken Schrader	1,005 (–228)
2	10	Harry Gant	1,005 (–228)
Official driver's standings

- Note: Only the first 10 positions are included for the driver standings.

Previous race: 1991 First Union 400	NASCAR Winston Cup Series; 1991 season	Next race: 1991 Winston 500
