= 1991 Coca-Cola 600 =

Tenth race of the 1991 NASCAR Winston Cup Series

Race details
- Race 10 of 29 in the 1991 NASCAR Winston Cup Series
- The 1991 Coca-Cola 600 program cover, with artwork by NASCAR artist Sam Bass.
- Date: May 26, 1991
- Official name: 32nd Annual Coca-Cola 600
- Location: Concord, North Carolina, Charlotte Motor Speedway
- Course: Permanent racing facility
- Course length: 1.5 miles (2.414 km)
- Distance: 400 laps, 600 mi (965.606 km)
- Average speed: 138.951 miles per hour (223.620 km/h)
- Attendance: 160,000

Pole position
Driver	Mark Martin	Roush Racing
- Time: 30.889

Most laps led
Driver	Davey Allison	Robert Yates Racing
- Laps: 263

Winner
No. 28	Davey Allison	Robert Yates Racing

Television in the United States
- Network: TBS
- Announcers: Ken Squier, Neil Bonnett

Radio in the United States
- Radio: Performance Racing Network

The 1991 Coca-Cola 600 was the tenth stock car race of the 1991 NASCAR Winston Cup Series and the 32nd iteration of the event. The race was held on Sunday, May 26, 1991, before an audience of 160,000 in Concord, North Carolina, at Charlotte Motor Speedway, a 1.5 miles (2.4 km) permanent quad-oval. The race took the scheduled 400 laps to complete. On the final restart with nine to go, Robert Yates Racing driver Davey Allison would manage to hold off the field to complete a dominant run in the race, earning him his ninth career NASCAR Winston Cup Series victory and his first victory of the season. To fill out the top three, Hendrick Motorsports driver Ken Schrader and Richard Childress Racing driver Dale Earnhardt would finish second and third, respectively.

== Background ==
The layout of Charlotte Motor Speedway, the venue where the race was held.

Charlotte Motor Speedway is a motorsports complex located in Concord, North Carolina, United States 13 miles from Charlotte, North Carolina. The complex features a 1.5 miles (2.4 km) quad oval track that hosts NASCAR racing including the prestigious Coca-Cola 600 on Memorial Day weekend and the NEXTEL All-Star Challenge, as well as the UAW-GM Quality 500. The speedway was built in 1959 by Bruton Smith and is considered the home track for NASCAR with many race teams located in the Charlotte area. The track is owned and operated by Speedway Motorsports Inc. (SMI) with Marcus G. Smith (son of Bruton Smith) as track president.

=== Entry list ===
- (R) denotes rookie driver.

#	Driver	Team	Make
1	Rick Mast	Precision Products Racing	Oldsmobile
2	Rusty Wallace	Penske Racing South	Pontiac
3	Dale Earnhardt	Richard Childress Racing	Chevrolet
03	Kerry Teague	Teague Racing	Oldsmobile
4	Ernie Irvan	Morgan–McClure Motorsports	Chevrolet
5	Ricky Rudd	Hendrick Motorsports	Chevrolet
6	Mark Martin	Roush Racing	Ford
7	Alan Kulwicki	AK Racing	Ford
8	Rick Wilson	Stavola Brothers Racing	Buick
9	Bill Elliott	Melling Racing	Ford
10	Derrike Cope	Whitcomb Racing	Chevrolet
11	Tommy Ellis*	Junior Johnson & Associates	Ford
12	Hut Stricklin	Bobby Allison Motorsports	Buick
13	Mike Skinner	Mansion Motorsports	Chevrolet
15	Morgan Shepherd	Bud Moore Engineering	Ford
17	Darrell Waltrip	Darrell Waltrip Motorsports	Chevrolet
19	Chad Little	Little Racing	Ford
20	Bobby Hillin Jr.	Moroso Racing	Oldsmobile
21	Dale Jarrett	Wood Brothers Racing	Ford
22	Sterling Marlin	Junior Johnson & Associates	Ford
23	Eddie Bierschwale	B&B Racing	Oldsmobile
24	Mickey Gibbs	Team III Racing	Pontiac
25	Ken Schrader	Hendrick Motorsports	Chevrolet
26	Brett Bodine	King Racing	Buick
28	Davey Allison	Robert Yates Racing	Ford
30	Michael Waltrip	Bahari Racing	Pontiac
33	Harry Gant	Leo Jackson Motorsports	Oldsmobile
34	Dick Trickle	AAG Racing	Buick
41	Larry Pearson	Larry Hedrick Motorsports	Chevrolet
42	Kenny Wallace	SABCO Racing	Pontiac
43	Richard Petty	Petty Enterprises	Pontiac
44	Bobby Labonte	Labonte Motorsports	Oldsmobile
47	Greg Sacks	Close Racing	Oldsmobile
49	Stanley Smith (R)	BS&S Motorsports	Buick
52	Jimmy Means	Jimmy Means Racing	Pontiac
55	Ted Musgrave (R)	U.S. Racing	Pontiac
66	Lake Speed	Cale Yarborough Motorsports	Pontiac
68	Bobby Hamilton (R)	TriStar Motorsports	Oldsmobile
70	J. D. McDuffie	McDuffie Racing	Pontiac
71	Dave Marcis	Marcis Auto Racing	Chevrolet
75	Joe Ruttman	RahMoc Enterprises	Oldsmobile
82	Mark Stahl	Stahl Racing	Ford
86	Jeff Green	Pinnacle Racing	Chevrolet
87	Randy Baker	Buck Baker Racing	Chevrolet
89	Jim Sauter	Mueller Brothers Racing	Pontiac
90	Wally Dallenbach Jr. (R)	Donlavey Racing	Ford
94	Terry Labonte	Hagan Racing	Oldsmobile
98	Jimmy Spencer	Travis Carter Enterprises	Chevrolet
99	Brad Teague	Ball Motorsports	Chevrolet

*Before the race, owner Junior Johnson, along with the team's crew chief, Tim Brewer, were suspended for 12 weeks. As a result, the team would change ownership for the race, changing the owner to Flossie Johnson, Junior's wife, along with changing the car's number to 97.

== Qualifying ==
Qualifying was split into two rounds. The first round was held on Wednesday, May 22, at 3:00 PM EST. Each driver would have one lap to set a time. During the first round, the top 20 drivers in the round would be guaranteed a starting spot in the race. If a driver was not able to guarantee a spot in the first round, they had the option to scrub their time from the first round and try and run a faster lap time in a second round qualifying run, held on Thursday, May 23, at 1:00 PM EST. As with the first round, each driver would have one lap to set a time. For this specific race, positions 21-40 would be decided on time, and depending on who needed it, a select amount of positions were given to cars who had not otherwise qualified but were high enough in owner's points; up to two were given. If needed, a past champion who did not qualify on either time or provisionals could use a champion's provisional, adding one more spot to the field.

Mark Martin, driving for Roush Racing, would win the pole, setting a time of 30.889 and an average speed of 174.820 miles per hour (281.346 km/h) in the first round.

Eight drivers would fail to qualify.

=== Full qualifying results ===
Pos.	#	Driver	Team	Make	Time	Speed
1	6	Mark Martin	Roush Racing	Ford	30.889	174.820
2	30	Michael Waltrip	Bahari Racing	Pontiac	30.931	174.582
3	25	Ken Schrader	Hendrick Motorsports	Chevrolet	30.942	174.520
4	22	Sterling Marlin	Junior Johnson & Associates	Ford	30.991	174.244
5	26	Brett Bodine	King Racing	Buick	31.057	173.874
6	4	Ernie Irvan	Morgan–McClure Motorsports	Chevrolet	31.133	173.449
7	33	Harry Gant	Leo Jackson Motorsports	Oldsmobile	31.147	173.371
8	7	Alan Kulwicki	AK Racing	Ford	31.173	173.227
9	2	Rusty Wallace	Penske Racing South	Pontiac	31.255	172.772
10	28	Davey Allison	Robert Yates Racing	Ford	31.265	172.717
11	9	Bill Elliott	Melling Racing	Ford	31.274	172.667
12	21	Dale Jarrett	Wood Brothers Racing	Ford	31.311	172.463
13	94	Terry Labonte	Hagan Racing	Oldsmobile	31.351	172.243
14	3	Dale Earnhardt	Richard Childress Racing	Chevrolet	31.361	172.188
15	1	Rick Mast	Precision Products Racing	Oldsmobile	31.366	172.161
16	66	Lake Speed	Cale Yarborough Motorsports	Pontiac	31.384	172.062
17	5	Ricky Rudd	Hendrick Motorsports	Chevrolet	31.409	171.925
18	17	Darrell Waltrip	Darrell Waltrip Motorsports	Chevrolet	31.417	171.881
19	42	Kenny Wallace	SABCO Racing	Pontiac	31.488	171.494
20	15	Morgan Shepherd	Bud Moore Engineering	Ford	31.505	171.401
Failed to lock in Round 1
21	10	Derrike Cope	Whitcomb Racing	Chevrolet	31.524	171.298
22	41	Larry Pearson	Larry Hedrick Motorsports	Chevrolet	31.530	171.265
23	19	Chad Little	Little Racing	Ford	31.545	171.184
24	43	Richard Petty	Petty Enterprises	Pontiac	31.549	171.162
25	71	Dave Marcis	Marcis Auto Racing	Chevrolet	31.568	171.059
26	47	Greg Sacks	Close Racing	Oldsmobile	31.587	170.956
27	24	Mickey Gibbs	Team III Racing	Pontiac	31.599	170.891
28	8	Rick Wilson	Stavola Brothers Racing	Buick	31.602	170.875
29	68	Bobby Hamilton (R)	TriStar Motorsports	Oldsmobile	31.633	170.708
30	12	Hut Stricklin	Bobby Allison Motorsports	Buick	31.647	170.632
31	20	Bobby Hillin Jr.	Moroso Racing	Oldsmobile	31.658	170.573
32	49	Stanley Smith (R)	BS&S Motorsports	Buick	31.680	170.455
33	98	Jimmy Spencer	Travis Carter Enterprises	Chevrolet	31.685	170.428
34	97	Tommy Ellis	Junior Johnson & Associates	Ford	31.691	170.395
35	75	Joe Ruttman	RahMoc Enterprises	Oldsmobile	31.701	170.342
36	89	Jim Sauter	Mueller Brothers Racing	Pontiac	31.706	170.315
37	55	Ted Musgrave (R)	U.S. Racing	Pontiac	31.773	169.956
38	34	Dick Trickle	AAG Racing	Buick	31.925	169.146
39	52	Jimmy Means	Jimmy Means Racing	Pontiac	32.047	168.503
40	23	Eddie Bierschwale	B&B Racing	Oldsmobile	32.071	168.376
Provisional
41	90	Wally Dallenbach Jr. (R)	Donlavey Racing	Ford	32.242	167.483
Failed to qualify
42	44	Bobby Labonte	Labonte Motorsports	Oldsmobile	-*	-*
43	70	J. D. McDuffie	McDuffie Racing	Pontiac	-*	-*
44	03	Kerry Teague	Teague Racing	Oldsmobile	-*	-*
45	99	Brad Teague	Ball Motorsports	Chevrolet	-*	-*
46	82	Mark Stahl	Stahl Racing	Ford	-*	-*
47	86	Jeff Green	Pinnacle Racing	Chevrolet	-*	-*
48	87	Randy Baker	Buck Baker Racing	Chevrolet	-*	-*
49	13	Mike Skinner	Mansion Motorsports	Chevrolet	-*	-*
Official first round qualifying results
Official starting lineup

== Race results ==
Fin	St	#	Driver	Team	Make	Laps	Led	Status	Pts	Winnings
1	10	28	Davey Allison	Robert Yates Racing	Ford	400	263	running	185	$137,100
2	3	25	Ken Schrader	Hendrick Motorsports	Chevrolet	400	60	running	175	$84,850
3	14	3	Dale Earnhardt	Richard Childress Racing	Chevrolet	400	26	running	170	$53,650
4	7	33	Harry Gant	Leo Jackson Motorsports	Oldsmobile	400	11	running	165	$37,700
5	12	21	Dale Jarrett	Wood Brothers Racing	Ford	400	3	running	160	$27,400
6	30	12	Hut Stricklin	Bobby Allison Motorsports	Buick	400	19	running	155	$25,400
7	6	4	Ernie Irvan	Morgan–McClure Motorsports	Chevrolet	399	0	running	146	$24,200
8	18	17	Darrell Waltrip	Darrell Waltrip Motorsports	Chevrolet	399	0	running	142	$15,500
9	17	5	Ricky Rudd	Hendrick Motorsports	Chevrolet	399	0	running	138	$21,500
10	13	94	Terry Labonte	Hagan Racing	Oldsmobile	399	0	running	134	$21,750
11	4	22	Sterling Marlin	Junior Johnson & Associates	Ford	398	0	running	130	$15,000
12	21	10	Derrike Cope	Whitcomb Racing	Chevrolet	398	0	running	127	$19,700
13	19	42	Kenny Wallace	SABCO Racing	Pontiac	398	1	running	129	$17,700
14	20	15	Morgan Shepherd	Bud Moore Engineering	Ford	397	0	running	121	$17,000
15	2	30	Michael Waltrip	Bahari Racing	Pontiac	397	9	running	123	$20,200
16	34	97	Tommy Ellis	Junior Johnson & Associates	Ford	396	0	running	0	$8,800
17	37	55	Ted Musgrave (R)	U.S. Racing	Pontiac	395	0	running	112	$11,000
18	28	8	Rick Wilson	Stavola Brothers Racing	Buick	394	0	running	109	$11,255
19	31	20	Bobby Hillin Jr.	Moroso Racing	Oldsmobile	390	0	engine	106	$8,500
20	24	43	Richard Petty	Petty Enterprises	Pontiac	383	0	accident	103	$10,000
21	35	75	Joe Ruttman	RahMoc Enterprises	Oldsmobile	359	0	running	100	$9,200
22	9	2	Rusty Wallace	Penske Racing South	Pontiac	353	5	engine	102	$7,000
23	1	6	Mark Martin	Roush Racing	Ford	339	3	engine	99	$55,400
24	40	23	Eddie Bierschwale	B&B Racing	Oldsmobile	336	0	running	91	$5,600
25	23	19	Chad Little	Little Racing	Ford	329	0	engine	88	$6,450
26	11	9	Bill Elliott	Melling Racing	Ford	315	0	engine	85	$13,200
27	29	68	Bobby Hamilton (R)	TriStar Motorsports	Oldsmobile	310	0	engine	82	$5,350
28	5	26	Brett Bodine	King Racing	Buick	300	0	overheating	79	$9,350
29	16	66	Lake Speed	Cale Yarborough Motorsports	Pontiac	296	0	engine	76	$7,650
30	15	1	Rick Mast	Precision Products Racing	Oldsmobile	287	0	running	73	$8,500
31	33	98	Jimmy Spencer	Travis Carter Enterprises	Chevrolet	278	0	engine	70	$7,375
32	25	71	Dave Marcis	Marcis Auto Racing	Chevrolet	270	0	engine	67	$7,275
33	41	90	Wally Dallenbach Jr. (R)	Donlavey Racing	Ford	254	0	transmission	64	$4,550
34	27	24	Mickey Gibbs	Team III Racing	Pontiac	251	0	running	61	$4,500
35	8	7	Alan Kulwicki	AK Racing	Ford	205	0	engine	58	$11,965
36	32	49	Stanley Smith (R)	BS&S Motorsports	Buick	128	0	brakes	55	$4,435
37	36	89	Jim Sauter	Mueller Brothers Racing	Pontiac	58	0	cylinder	52	$4,415
38	39	52	Jimmy Means	Jimmy Means Racing	Pontiac	32	0	engine	49	$5,520
39	26	47	Greg Sacks	Close Racing	Oldsmobile	21	0	accident	46	$4,980
40	38	34	Dick Trickle	AAG Racing	Buick	19	0	accident	43	$4,360
41	22	41	Larry Pearson	Larry Hedrick Motorsports	Chevrolet	12	0	overheating	40	$4,360
Failed to qualify
42		44	Bobby Labonte	Labonte Motorsports	Oldsmobile					
43		70	J. D. McDuffie	McDuffie Racing	Pontiac					
44		03	Kerry Teague	Teague Racing	Oldsmobile					
45		99	Brad Teague	Ball Motorsports	Chevrolet					
46		82	Mark Stahl	Stahl Racing	Ford					
47		86	Jeff Green	Pinnacle Racing	Chevrolet					
48		87	Randy Baker	Buck Baker Racing	Chevrolet					
49		13	Mike Skinner	Mansion Motorsports	Chevrolet					
Official race results

== Standings after the race ==
Drivers' Championship standings

	Pos	Driver	Points
	1	Dale Earnhardt	1,536
	2	Ricky Rudd	1,500 (-33)
	3	Darrell Waltrip	1,423 (-116)
1	4	Harry Gant	1,350 (–186)
2	5	Davey Allison	1,342 (–194)
2	6	Ken Schrader	1,331 (–205)
1	7	Ernie Irvan	1,329 (–207)
4	8	Michael Waltrip	1,311 (–225)
	9	Morgan Shepherd	1,253 (–283)
1	10	Sterling Marlin	1,220 (–316)
Official driver's standings

- Note: Only the first 10 positions are included for the driver standings.

Previous race: 1991 Winston 500	NASCAR Winston Cup Series; 1991 season	Next race: 1991 Budweiser 500
