= 1991 Valleydale Meats 500 =

Sixth race of the 1991 NASCAR Winston Cup Series

Race details
- Race 6 of 29 in the 1991 NASCAR Winston Cup Series
- The 1991 Valleydale Meats 500 program cover.
- Date: April 14, 1991
- Official name: 31st Annual Valleydale Meats 500
- Location: Bristol, Tennessee, Bristol Motor Speedway
- Course: Permanent racing facility
- Course length: 0.533 miles (0.858 km)
- Distance: 500 laps, 266.5 mi (428.89 km)
- Scheduled distance: 500 laps, 266.5 mi (428.89 km)
- Average speed: 72.809 miles per hour (117.175 km/h)
- Attendance: 58,300

Pole position
Driver	Rusty Wallace	Penske Racing South
- Time: 16.254

Most laps led
Driver	Ricky Rudd	Hendrick Motorsports
- Laps: 145

Winner
No. 2	Rusty Wallace	Penske Racing South

Television in the United States
- Network: ESPN
- Announcers: Bob Jenkins, Ned Jarrett, Benny Parsons

Radio in the United States
- Radio: Motor Racing Network

The 1991 Valleydale Meats 500 was the sixth stock car race of the 1991 NASCAR Winston Cup Series and the 31st iteration of the event. The race was held on Sunday, April 14, 1991, before an audience of 58,300 in Bristol, Tennessee, at Bristol Motor Speedway, a 0.533 miles (0.858 km) permanent oval-shaped racetrack. The race took the scheduled 500 laps to complete. In a chaotic race, Penske Racing South driver Rusty Wallace would manage to come back from a two-lap deficit and hold off Morgan–McClure Motorsports driver Ernie Irvan to take his 19th career NASCAR Winston Cup Series victory and his first victory of the season. To fill out the top three, the aforementioned Ernie Irvan and Robert Yates Racing driver Davey Allison would finish second and third, respectively.

== Background ==
The layout of Bristol Motor Speedway, the venue where the race was held.

The Bristol Motor Speedway, formerly known as Bristol International Raceway and Bristol Raceway, is a NASCAR short track venue located in Bristol, Tennessee. Constructed in 1960, it held its first NASCAR race on July 30, 1961. Despite its short length, Bristol is among the most popular tracks on the NASCAR schedule because of its distinct features, which include extraordinarily steep banking, an all concrete surface, two pit roads, and stadium-like seating. It has also been named one of the loudest NASCAR tracks.

=== Entry list ===
- (R) denotes rookie driver.

#	Driver	Team	Make
1	Rick Mast	Precision Products Racing	Oldsmobile
2	Rusty Wallace	Penske Racing South	Pontiac
3	Dale Earnhardt	Richard Childress Racing	Chevrolet
4	Ernie Irvan	Morgan–McClure Motorsports	Chevrolet
5	Ricky Rudd	Hendrick Motorsports	Chevrolet
6	Mark Martin	Roush Racing	Ford
7	Alan Kulwicki	AK Racing	Ford
8	Rick Wilson	Stavola Brothers Racing	Buick
9	Bill Elliott	Melling Racing	Ford
10	Derrike Cope	Whitcomb Racing	Chevrolet
11	Geoff Bodine	Junior Johnson & Associates	Ford
12	Hut Stricklin	Bobby Allison Motorsports	Buick
15	Morgan Shepherd	Bud Moore Engineering	Ford
17	Darrell Waltrip	Darrell Waltrip Motorsports	Chevrolet
19	Chad Little	Little Racing	Ford
20	Bobby Hillin Jr.	Moroso Racing	Oldsmobile
21	Dale Jarrett	Wood Brothers Racing	Ford
22	Sterling Marlin	Junior Johnson & Associates	Ford
24	Mickey Gibbs	Team III Racing	Pontiac
25	Ken Schrader	Hendrick Motorsports	Chevrolet
26	Brett Bodine	King Racing	Buick
28	Davey Allison	Robert Yates Racing	Ford
30	Michael Waltrip	Bahari Racing	Pontiac
33	Harry Gant	Leo Jackson Motorsports	Oldsmobile
34	Dick Trickle	AAG Racing	Buick
42	Kyle Petty	SABCO Racing	Pontiac
43	Richard Petty	Petty Enterprises	Pontiac
52	Jimmy Means	Jimmy Means Racing	Pontiac
55	Ted Musgrave (R)	U.S. Racing	Pontiac
66	Lake Speed	Cale Yarborough Motorsports	Pontiac
68	Bobby Hamilton (R)	TriStar Motorsports	Oldsmobile
70	J. D. McDuffie	McDuffie Racing	Pontiac
71	Dave Marcis	Marcis Auto Racing	Chevrolet
75	Joe Ruttman	RahMoc Enterprises	Oldsmobile
94	Terry Labonte	Hagan Racing	Oldsmobile
98	Jimmy Spencer	Travis Carter Enterprises	Chevrolet

== Qualifying ==
Qualifying was originally scheduled to be split into two rounds. The first round was held on Friday, April 12, at 3:00 PM EST. Originally, the first 15 positions were going to be determined by first round qualifying, with positions 16-30 meant to be determined the following day on Saturday, April 13. However, due to rain, the second round was cancelled. As a result, the rest of the starting lineup was set using the results from the first round. Depending on who needed it, a select amount of positions were given to cars who had not otherwise qualified but were high enough in owner's points; up to two were given. If needed, a past champion who did not qualify on either time or provisionals could use a champion's provisional, adding one more spot to the field.

Rusty Wallace, driving for Penske Racing South, would win the pole, setting a time of 16.254 and an average speed of 118.051 miles per hour (189.985 km/h).

Three drivers would fail to qualify.

=== Full qualifying results ===
Pos.	#	Driver	Team	Make	Time	Speed
1	2	Rusty Wallace	Penske Racing South	Pontiac	16.254	118.051
2	3	Dale Earnhardt	Richard Childress Racing	Chevrolet	16.369	117.222
3	28	Davey Allison	Robert Yates Racing	Ford	16.374	117.186
4	5	Ricky Rudd	Hendrick Motorsports	Chevrolet	16.385	117.107
5	7	Alan Kulwicki	AK Racing	Ford	16.391	117.064
6	6	Mark Martin	Roush Racing	Ford	16.407	116.950
7	26	Brett Bodine	King Racing	Buick	16.409	116.936
8	4	Ernie Irvan	Morgan–McClure Motorsports	Chevrolet	16.418	116.872
9	1	Rick Mast	Precision Products Racing	Oldsmobile	16.428	116.801
10	33	Harry Gant	Leo Jackson Motorsports	Oldsmobile	16.435	116.751
11	11	Geoff Bodine	Junior Johnson & Associates	Ford	16.443	116.694
12	42	Kyle Petty	SABCO Racing	Pontiac	16.453	116.623
13	12	Hut Stricklin	Bobby Allison Motorsports	Buick	16.468	116.517
14	25	Ken Schrader	Hendrick Motorsports	Chevrolet	16.468	116.517
15	22	Sterling Marlin	Junior Johnson & Associates	Ford	16.482	116.418
Failed to lock in Round 1
16	8	Rick Wilson	Stavola Brothers Racing	Buick	16.503	116.270
17	24	Mickey Gibbs	Team III Racing	Pontiac	16.512	116.206
18	21	Dale Jarrett	Wood Brothers Racing	Ford	16.524	116.122
19	20	Bobby Hillin Jr.	Moroso Racing	Oldsmobile	16.584	115.702
20	98	Jimmy Spencer	Travis Carter Enterprises	Chevrolet	16.596	115.618
21	34	Dick Trickle	AAG Racing	Buick	16.598	115.604
22	17	Darrell Waltrip	Darrell Waltrip Motorsports	Chevrolet	16.602	115.576
23	75	Joe Ruttman	RahMoc Enterprises	Oldsmobile	16.635	115.347
24	66	Lake Speed	Cale Yarborough Motorsports	Pontiac	16.635	115.347
25	30	Michael Waltrip	Bahari Racing	Pontiac	16.665	115.140
26	15	Morgan Shepherd	Bud Moore Engineering	Ford	16.697	114.919
27	55	Ted Musgrave (R)	U.S. Racing	Pontiac	16.704	114.871
28	68	Bobby Hamilton (R)	TriStar Motorsports	Oldsmobile	16.710	114.829
29	9	Bill Elliott	Melling Racing	Ford	16.729	114.699
30	94	Terry Labonte	Hagan Racing	Oldsmobile	16.780	114.350
Provisionals
31	19	Chad Little	Little Racing	Ford	16.835	113.977
32	10	Derrike Cope	Whitcomb Racing	Chevrolet	16.853	113.855
Champion's Provisional
33	43	Richard Petty	Petty Enterprises	Pontiac	16.917	113.424
Failed to qualify
34	71	Dave Marcis	Marcis Auto Racing	Chevrolet	16.820	114.078
35	52	Jimmy Means	Jimmy Means Racing	Pontiac	17.359	110.536
36	70	J. D. McDuffie	McDuffie Racing	Pontiac	17.626	108.862
Official first round qualifying results
Official starting lineup

== Race results ==
Fin	St	#	Driver	Team	Make	Laps	Led	Status	Pts	Winnings
1	1	2	Rusty Wallace	Penske Racing South	Pontiac	500	104	running	180	$51,300
2	8	4	Ernie Irvan	Morgan–McClure Motorsports	Chevrolet	500	73	running	175	$26,000
3	3	28	Davey Allison	Robert Yates Racing	Ford	500	91	running	170	$18,950
5	4	5	Ricky Rudd	Hendrick Motorsports	Chevrolet	500	145	running	165	$37,950
4	6	6	Mark Martin	Roush Racing	Ford	500	42	running	165	$18,950
6	22	17	Darrell Waltrip	Darrell Waltrip Motorsports	Chevrolet	500	0	running	150	$7,525
7	18	21	Dale Jarrett	Wood Brothers Racing	Ford	500	0	running	146	$10,775
8	20	98	Jimmy Spencer	Travis Carter Enterprises	Chevrolet	500	0	running	142	$10,175
9	30	94	Terry Labonte	Hagan Racing	Oldsmobile	500	0	running	138	$9,575
10	26	15	Morgan Shepherd	Bud Moore Engineering	Ford	498	0	running	134	$14,275
11	10	33	Harry Gant	Leo Jackson Motorsports	Oldsmobile	498	32	running	135	$9,375
12	27	55	Ted Musgrave (R)	U.S. Racing	Pontiac	498	0	running	127	$8,275
13	23	75	Joe Ruttman	RahMoc Enterprises	Oldsmobile	498	0	running	124	$8,150
14	31	19	Chad Little	Little Racing	Ford	497	6	running	126	$6,400
15	19	20	Bobby Hillin Jr.	Moroso Racing	Oldsmobile	497	0	running	118	$6,800
16	13	12	Hut Stricklin	Bobby Allison Motorsports	Buick	496	0	running	115	$7,475
17	33	43	Richard Petty	Petty Enterprises	Pontiac	496	0	running	112	$7,225
18	9	1	Rick Mast	Precision Products Racing	Oldsmobile	492	0	running	109	$7,025
19	17	24	Mickey Gibbs	Team III Racing	Pontiac	492	0	running	106	$4,665
20	2	3	Dale Earnhardt	Richard Childress Racing	Chevrolet	484	0	running	103	$15,525
21	12	42	Kyle Petty	SABCO Racing	Pontiac	480	0	running	100	$10,125
22	7	26	Brett Bodine	King Racing	Buick	471	0	running	97	$6,675
23	25	30	Michael Waltrip	Bahari Racing	Pontiac	463	0	running	94	$6,550
24	11	11	Geoff Bodine	Junior Johnson & Associates	Ford	461	0	running	91	$11,750
25	24	66	Lake Speed	Cale Yarborough Motorsports	Pontiac	455	0	running	88	$6,480
26	5	7	Alan Kulwicki	AK Racing	Ford	434	0	running	85	$9,875
27	15	22	Sterling Marlin	Junior Johnson & Associates	Ford	421	0	crash	82	$5,150
28	29	9	Bill Elliott	Melling Racing	Ford	406	0	running	79	$9,800
29	14	25	Ken Schrader	Hendrick Motorsports	Chevrolet	314	7	crash	81	$6,220
30	21	34	Dick Trickle	AAG Racing	Buick	314	0	ignition	73	$4,025
31	28	68	Bobby Hamilton (R)	TriStar Motorsports	Oldsmobile	124	0	engine	70	$4,275
32	32	10	Derrike Cope	Whitcomb Racing	Chevrolet	80	0	crash	67	$11,125
33	16	8	Rick Wilson	Stavola Brothers Racing	Buick	78	0	overheating	64	$5,850
Official race results

== Standings after the race ==
Drivers' Championship standings

	Pos	Driver	Points
	1	Ricky Rudd	973
1	2	Ernie Irvan	854 (-119)
1	3	Dale Earnhardt	831 (-142)
2	4	Mark Martin	813 (–160)
4	5	Rusty Wallace	805 (–168)
1	6	Morgan Shepherd	778 (–195)
6	7	Darrell Waltrip	761 (–212)
7	8	Davey Allison	758 (–215)
5	9	Ken Schrader	751 (–222)
5	10	Sterling Marlin	749 (–224)
Official driver's standings

- Note: Only the first 10 positions are included for the driver standings.

Previous race: 1991 TranSouth 500	NASCAR Winston Cup Series; 1991 season	Next race: 1991 First Union 400
