= 1991 Budweiser 500 =

11th race of the 1991 NASCAR Winston Cup Series

Race details
- Race 11 of 29 in the 1991 NASCAR Winston Cup Series
- The 1991 Budweiser 500 program cover, featuring Geoff Bodine.
- Date: June 2, 1991
- Official name: 23rd Annual Budweiser 500
- Location: Dover, Delaware, Dover Downs International Speedway
- Course: Permanent racing facility
- Course length: 1 miles (1.6 km)
- Distance: 500 laps, 500 mi (804.672 km)
- Scheduled distance: 500 laps, 500 mi (804.672 km)
- Average speed: 120.152 miles per hour (193.366 km/h)
- Attendance: 77,000

Pole position
| Driver | Michael Waltrip | Bahari Racing |
- Time: 25.106

Most laps led
| Driver | Dale Earnhardt | Richard Childress Racing |
- Laps: 187

Winner
| No. 25 | Ken Schrader | Hendrick Motorsports |

Television in the United States
- Network: TNN
- Announcers: Mike Joy, Buddy Baker, Phil Parsons

Radio in the United States
- Radio: Motor Racing Network

The 1991 Budweiser 500 was the 11th stock car race of the 1991 NASCAR Winston Cup Series and the 23rd iteration of the event. The race was held on Sunday, May 31, 1991, before an audience of 77,000 in Dover, Delaware at Dover Downs International Speedway, a 1-mile (1.6 km) permanent oval-shaped racetrack. The race took the scheduled 500 laps to complete. At race's end, Hendrick Motorsports driver Ken Schrader, after making a late-race pass for the lead with 78 laps to go in the race, would manage to hold onto the lead for the rest of the race to take his fourth and to date, final career NASCAR Winston Cup Series victory and his second and final victory of the season. To fill out the top three, Richard Childress Racing driver Dale Earnhardt and Leo Jackson Motorsports driver Harry Gant would finish second and third, respectively.

== Background ==
The layout of Dover Downs International Speedway, the venue where the race was held.

Dover Downs International Speedway is an oval race track in Dover, Delaware, United States that has held at least two NASCAR races since it opened in 1969. In addition to NASCAR, the track also hosted USAC and the NTT IndyCar Series. The track features one layout, a 1-mile (1.6 km) concrete oval, with 24° banking in the turns and 9° banking on the straights. The speedway is owned and operated by Dover Motorsports.

The track, nicknamed "The Monster Mile", was built in 1969 by Melvin Joseph of Melvin L. Joseph Construction Company, Inc., with an asphalt surface, but was replaced with concrete in 1995. Six years later in 2001, the track's capacity moved to 135,000 seats, making the track have the largest capacity of sports venue in the mid-Atlantic. In 2002, the name changed to Dover International Speedway from Dover Downs International Speedway after Dover Downs Gaming and Entertainment split, making Dover Motorsports. From 2007 to 2009, the speedway worked on an improvement project called "The Monster Makeover", which expanded facilities at the track and beautified the track. After the 2014 season, the track's capacity was reduced to 95,500 seats.

=== Entry list ===
- (R) denotes rookie driver.

| # | Driver | Team | Make |
|---|---|---|---|
| 1 | Rick Mast | Precision Products Racing | Oldsmobile |
| 2 | Rusty Wallace | Penske Racing South | Pontiac |
| 3 | Dale Earnhardt | Richard Childress Racing | Chevrolet |
| 4 | Ernie Irvan | Morgan–McClure Motorsports | Chevrolet |
| 5 | Ricky Rudd | Hendrick Motorsports | Chevrolet |
| 6 | Mark Martin | Roush Racing | Ford |
| 7 | Alan Kulwicki | AK Racing | Ford |
| 8 | Rick Wilson | Stavola Brothers Racing | Buick |
| 9 | Bill Elliott | Melling Racing | Ford |
| 10 | Derrike Cope | Whitcomb Racing | Chevrolet |
| 12 | Hut Stricklin | Bobby Allison Motorsports | Buick |
| 14 | Bobby Labonte | Labonte Motorsports | Oldsmobile |
| 15 | Morgan Shepherd | Bud Moore Engineering | Ford |
| 17 | Darrell Waltrip | Darrell Waltrip Motorsports | Chevrolet |
| 19 | Chad Little | Little Racing | Ford |
| 21 | Dale Jarrett | Wood Brothers Racing | Ford |
| 22 | Sterling Marlin | Junior Johnson & Associates | Ford |
| 24 | Mickey Gibbs | Team III Racing | Pontiac |
| 25 | Ken Schrader | Hendrick Motorsports | Chevrolet |
| 26 | Brett Bodine | King Racing | Buick |
| 28 | Davey Allison | Robert Yates Racing | Ford |
| 30 | Michael Waltrip | Bahari Racing | Pontiac |
| 33 | Harry Gant | Leo Jackson Motorsports | Oldsmobile |
| 42 | Kenny Wallace | SABCO Racing | Pontiac |
| 43 | Richard Petty | Petty Enterprises | Pontiac |
| 45 | Billy Fulcher | Fulcher Racing | Oldsmobile |
| 52 | Bobby Hillin Jr. | Jimmy Means Racing | Pontiac |
| 55 | Ted Musgrave (R) | U.S. Racing | Pontiac |
| 66 | Lake Speed | Cale Yarborough Motorsports | Pontiac |
| 68 | Bobby Hamilton (R) | TriStar Motorsports | Oldsmobile |
| 70 | J. D. McDuffie | McDuffie Racing | Pontiac |
| 71 | Dave Marcis | Marcis Auto Racing | Chevrolet |
| 75 | Joe Ruttman | RahMoc Enterprises | Oldsmobile |
| 94 | Terry Labonte | Hagan Racing | Oldsmobile |
| 97 | Tommy Ellis | Junior Johnson & Associates | Ford |
| 98 | Jimmy Spencer | Travis Carter Enterprises | Chevrolet |

== Qualifying ==
Qualifying was split into two rounds. The first round was held on Friday, May 31, at 3:00 PM EST. Each driver would have one lap to set a time. During the first round, the top 20 drivers in the round would be guaranteed a starting spot in the race. If a driver was not able to guarantee a spot in the first round, they had the option to scrub their time from the first round and try and run a faster lap time in a second round qualifying run, held on Saturday, June 1, at 11:30 AM EST. As with the first round, each driver would have one lap to set a time. For this specific race, positions 21-40 would be decided on time, and depending on who needed it, a select amount of positions were given to cars who had not otherwise qualified but were high enough in owner's points; up to two provisionals were given. If needed, a past champion who did not qualify on either time or provisionals could use a champion's provisional, adding one more spot to the field.

Michael Waltrip, driving for Bahari Racing, would win the pole, setting a time of 25.106 and an average speed of 143.392 miles per hour (230.767 km/h) in the first round.

Billy Fulcher was the only driver to fail to qualify after his qualifying speed was determined to be too slow to run the race.

=== Full qualifying results ===
| Pos. | # | Driver | Team | Make | Time | Speed |
|---|---|---|---|---|---|---|
| 1 | 30 | Michael Waltrip | Bahari Racing | Pontiac | 25.106 | 143.392 |
| 2 | 2 | Rusty Wallace | Penske Racing South | Pontiac | 25.212 | 142.789 |
| 3 | 1 | Rick Mast | Precision Products Racing | Oldsmobile | 25.219 | 142.750 |
| 4 | 7 | Alan Kulwicki | AK Racing | Ford | 25.237 | 142.648 |
| 5 | 6 | Mark Martin | Roush Racing | Ford | 25.241 | 142.625 |
| 6 | 4 | Ernie Irvan | Morgan–McClure Motorsports | Chevrolet | 25.257 | 142.535 |
| 7 | 33 | Harry Gant | Leo Jackson Motorsports | Oldsmobile | 25.268 | 142.473 |
| 8 | 94 | Terry Labonte | Hagan Racing | Oldsmobile | 25.298 | 142.304 |
| 9 | 8 | Rick Wilson | Stavola Brothers Racing | Buick | 25.324 | 142.158 |
| 10 | 3 | Dale Earnhardt | Richard Childress Racing | Chevrolet | 25.335 | 142.096 |
| 11 | 28 | Davey Allison | Robert Yates Racing | Ford | 25.337 | 142.085 |
| 12 | 12 | Hut Stricklin | Bobby Allison Motorsports | Buick | 25.354 | 141.989 |
| 13 | 5 | Ricky Rudd | Hendrick Motorsports | Chevrolet | 25.357 | 141.972 |
| 14 | 98 | Jimmy Spencer | Travis Carter Enterprises | Chevrolet | 25.370 | 141.900 |
| 15 | 42 | Kenny Wallace | SABCO Racing | Pontiac | 25.403 | 141.716 |
| 16 | 26 | Brett Bodine | King Racing | Buick | 25.407 | 141.693 |
| 17 | 9 | Bill Elliott | Melling Racing | Ford | 25.510 | 141.121 |
| 18 | 17 | Darrell Waltrip | Darrell Waltrip Motorsports | Chevrolet | 25.538 | 140.966 |
| 19 | 25 | Ken Schrader | Hendrick Motorsports | Chevrolet | 25.554 | 140.878 |
| 20 | 21 | Dale Jarrett | Wood Brothers Racing | Ford | 25.565 | 140.818 |
Failed to lock in Round 1
| 21 | 15 | Morgan Shepherd | Bud Moore Engineering | Ford | 25.455 | 141.426 |
| 22 | 22 | Sterling Marlin | Junior Johnson & Associates | Ford | 25.554 | 140.878 |
| 23 | 66 | Lake Speed | Cale Yarborough Motorsports | Pontiac | 25.595 | 140.652 |
| 24 | 10 | Derrike Cope | Whitcomb Racing | Chevrolet | 25.656 | 140.318 |
| 25 | 55 | Ted Musgrave (R) | U.S. Racing | Pontiac | 25.692 | 140.121 |
| 26 | 97 | Tommy Ellis | Junior Johnson & Associates | Ford | 25.741 | 139.855 |
| 27 | 75 | Joe Ruttman | RahMoc Enterprises | Oldsmobile | 25.816 | 139.448 |
| 28 | 24 | Mickey Gibbs | Team III Racing | Pontiac | 25.855 | 139.238 |
| 29 | 71 | Dave Marcis | Marcis Auto Racing | Chevrolet | 25.864 | 139.190 |
| 30 | 52 | Bobby Hillin Jr. | Jimmy Means Racing | Pontiac | 25.892 | 139.039 |
| 31 | 43 | Richard Petty | Petty Enterprises | Pontiac | 25.899 | 139.002 |
| 32 | 68 | Bobby Hamilton (R) | TriStar Motorsports | Oldsmobile | 25.908 | 138.953 |
| 33 | 14 | Bobby Labonte | Labonte Motorsports | Oldsmobile | 25.952 | 138.718 |
| 34 | 19 | Chad Little | Little Racing | Ford | 26.117 | 137.841 |
| 35 | 70 | J. D. McDuffie | McDuffie Racing | Pontiac | 26.582 | 135.430 |
Failed to qualify
| 36 | 45 | Billy Fulcher | Fulcher Racing | Oldsmobile | 31.259 | 115.167 |
Official first round qualifying results
Official starting lineup

== Race results ==
| Fin | St | # | Driver | Team | Make | Laps | Led | Status | Pts | Winnings |
|---|---|---|---|---|---|---|---|---|---|---|
| 1 | 19 | 25 | Ken Schrader | Hendrick Motorsports | Chevrolet | 500 | 89 | running | 180 | $64,800 |
| 2 | 10 | 3 | Dale Earnhardt | Richard Childress Racing | Chevrolet | 500 | 187 | running | 180 | $44,275 |
| 3 | 7 | 33 | Harry Gant | Leo Jackson Motorsports | Oldsmobile | 500 | 45 | running | 170 | $28,800 |
| 4 | 6 | 4 | Ernie Irvan | Morgan–McClure Motorsports | Chevrolet | 500 | 40 | running | 165 | $21,750 |
| 5 | 5 | 6 | Mark Martin | Roush Racing | Ford | 500 | 79 | running | 160 | $23,325 |
| 6 | 12 | 12 | Hut Stricklin | Bobby Allison Motorsports | Buick | 500 | 0 | running | 150 | $13,950 |
| 7 | 18 | 17 | Darrell Waltrip | Darrell Waltrip Motorsports | Chevrolet | 499 | 10 | running | 151 | $10,900 |
| 8 | 21 | 15 | Morgan Shepherd | Bud Moore Engineering | Ford | 498 | 24 | running | 147 | $15,700 |
| 9 | 2 | 2 | Rusty Wallace | Penske Racing South | Pontiac | 498 | 11 | running | 143 | $9,950 |
| 10 | 13 | 5 | Ricky Rudd | Hendrick Motorsports | Chevrolet | 497 | 0 | running | 134 | $18,000 |
| 11 | 32 | 68 | Bobby Hamilton (R) | TriStar Motorsports | Oldsmobile | 495 | 0 | running | 130 | $9,050 |
| 12 | 27 | 75 | Joe Ruttman | RahMoc Enterprises | Oldsmobile | 494 | 0 | running | 127 | $9,700 |
| 13 | 17 | 9 | Bill Elliott | Melling Racing | Ford | 494 | 0 | running | 124 | $13,600 |
| 14 | 4 | 7 | Alan Kulwicki | AK Racing | Ford | 494 | 0 | running | 121 | $12,300 |
| 15 | 22 | 22 | Sterling Marlin | Junior Johnson & Associates | Ford | 494 | 0 | running | 118 | $7,350 |
| 16 | 11 | 28 | Davey Allison | Robert Yates Racing | Ford | 494 | 0 | running | 115 | $13,450 |
| 17 | 31 | 43 | Richard Petty | Petty Enterprises | Pontiac | 494 | 0 | running | 112 | $6,050 |
| 18 | 25 | 55 | Ted Musgrave (R) | U.S. Racing | Pontiac | 494 | 0 | running | 109 | $5,985 |
| 19 | 30 | 52 | Bobby Hillin Jr. | Jimmy Means Racing | Pontiac | 491 | 0 | running | 106 | $4,550 |
| 20 | 3 | 1 | Rick Mast | Precision Products Racing | Oldsmobile | 491 | 0 | running | 103 | $8,600 |
| 21 | 26 | 97 | Tommy Ellis | Junior Johnson & Associates | Ford | 491 | 0 | running | 100 | $4,450 |
| 22 | 23 | 66 | Lake Speed | Cale Yarborough Motorsports | Pontiac | 491 | 0 | running | 97 | $7,350 |
| 23 | 29 | 71 | Dave Marcis | Marcis Auto Racing | Chevrolet | 487 | 0 | running | 94 | $7,200 |
| 24 | 8 | 94 | Terry Labonte | Hagan Racing | Oldsmobile | 483 | 0 | running | 91 | $7,050 |
| 25 | 9 | 8 | Rick Wilson | Stavola Brothers Racing | Buick | 480 | 0 | running | 88 | $7,050 |
| 26 | 15 | 42 | Kenny Wallace | SABCO Racing | Pontiac | 478 | 0 | running | 85 | $11,200 |
| 27 | 24 | 10 | Derrike Cope | Whitcomb Racing | Chevrolet | 399 | 0 | crash | 82 | $12,550 |
| 28 | 14 | 98 | Jimmy Spencer | Travis Carter Enterprises | Chevrolet | 369 | 0 | crash | 79 | $6,775 |
| 29 | 34 | 19 | Chad Little | Little Racing | Ford | 337 | 0 | engine | 76 | $4,050 |
| 30 | 28 | 24 | Mickey Gibbs | Team III Racing | Pontiac | 303 | 0 | steering | 73 | $4,650 |
| 31 | 35 | 70 | J. D. McDuffie | McDuffie Racing | Pontiac | 245 | 0 | crash | 70 | $3,950 |
| 32 | 1 | 30 | Michael Waltrip | Bahari Racing | Pontiac | 186 | 15 | engine | 72 | $10,025 |
| 33 | 16 | 26 | Brett Bodine | King Racing | Buick | 133 | 0 | camshaft | 64 | $6,450 |
| 34 | 33 | 14 | Bobby Labonte | Labonte Motorsports | Oldsmobile | 88 | 0 | engine | 61 | $3,800 |
| 35 | 20 | 21 | Dale Jarrett | Wood Brothers Racing | Ford | 18 | 0 | crash | 58 | $5,600 |
Official race results

== Standings after the race ==
Drivers' Championship standings

| | Pos | Driver | Points |
|---|---|---|---|
| | 1 | Dale Earnhardt | 1,716 |
| | 2 | Ricky Rudd | 1,634 (-82) |
| | 3 | Darrell Waltrip | 1,574 (-142) |
| | 4 | Harry Gant | 1,520 (–196) |
| 1 | 5 | Ken Schrader | 1,511 (–205) |
| 1 | 6 | Ernie Irvan | 1,494 (–222) |
| 2 | 7 | Davey Allison | 1,457 (–259) |
| 1 | 8 | Morgan Shepherd | 1,400 (–316) |
| 1 | 9 | Michael Waltrip | 1,383 (–333) |
| 1 | 10 | Mark Martin | 1,377 (–339) |
Official driver's standings

- Note: Only the first 10 positions are included for the driver standings.

| Previous race: 1991 Coca-Cola 600 | NASCAR Winston Cup Series; 1991 season | Next race: 1991 Banquet Frozen Foods 300 |
