= 1991 Winston 500 =

Ninth race of the 1991 NASCAR Winston Cup Series

Race details
- Race 9 of 29 in the 1991 NASCAR Winston Cup Series
- The 1991 Winston 500 program cover, featuring Dale Earnhardt.
- Date: May 6, 1991
- Official name: 22nd Annual Winston 500
- Location: Lincoln, Alabama, Talladega Superspeedway
- Course: Permanent racing facility
- Course length: 2.66 miles (4.28 km)
- Distance: 188 laps, 500.08 mi (804.8 km)
- Scheduled distance: 188 laps, 500.08 mi (804.8 km)
- Average speed: 165.62 miles per hour (266.54 km/h)
- Attendance: 105,000

Pole position
Driver	Ernie Irvan	Morgan-McClure Motorsports
- Time: 49.061

Most laps led
Driver	Dale Earnhardt	Richard Childress Racing
- Laps: 112

Winner
No. 33	Harry Gant	Leo Jackson Motorsports

Television in the United States
- Network: ESPN
- Announcers: Bob Jenkins, Ned Jarrett, Benny Parsons

Radio in the United States
- Radio: Motor Racing Network

The 1991 Winston 500 was the ninth stock car race of the 1991 NASCAR Winston Cup Series and the 22nd iteration of the event. The race was originally scheduled to be held on Sunday, May 5, 1991, but was delayed to Monday, May 6, due to rain. The race was held before an audience of 105,000 in Lincoln, Alabama at Talladega Superspeedway, a 2.66 miles (4.28 km) permanent triangle-shaped superspeedway. The race took the scheduled 188 laps to complete. Running on a fuel strategy, Leo Jackson Motorsports driver Harry Gant would manage to drive the last 56 laps of the race on one tank of fuel to take his 12th career NASCAR Winston Cup Series victory, his only won on a restrictor plate race and his first victory of the season.

On lap 72 of the race, a 20-car crash would occur when Morgan–McClure Motorsports driver Ernie Irvan's car hit both Kyle Petty and Mark Martin's cars, causing a chain reaction crash in the field. In the crash, Kyle Petty would suffer a broken left femur, causing Petty to miss the next several races due to his injury. Irvan would take most of the blame for causing the crash by drivers, with many of the drivers involved in the crash claiming that Irvan had been "out of control" for the entire race leading up to that point.

== Background ==
The layout of Talladega Superspeedway, the venue where the race was held.

Talladega Superspeedway, originally known as Alabama International Motor Superspeedway (AIMS), is a motorsports complex located north of Talladega, Alabama. It is located on the former Anniston Air Force Base in the small city of Lincoln. The track is a tri-oval and was constructed in the 1960s by the International Speedway Corporation, a business controlled by the France family. Talladega is most known for its steep banking and the unique location of the start/finish line that's located just past the exit to pit road. The track currently hosts the NASCAR series such as the NASCAR Cup Series, Xfinity Series and the Camping World Truck Series. Talladega is the longest NASCAR oval, a 2.66-mile-long (4.28 km) tri-oval like the Daytona International Speedway, which also is a 2.5-mile-long (4.0 km) tri-oval.

=== Entry list ===
- (R) denotes rookie driver.

#	Driver	Team	Make
1	Rick Mast	Precision Products Racing	Oldsmobile
2	Rusty Wallace	Penske Racing South	Pontiac
3	Dale Earnhardt	Richard Childress Racing	Chevrolet
4	Ernie Irvan	Morgan–McClure Motorsports	Chevrolet
5	Ricky Rudd	Hendrick Motorsports	Chevrolet
6	Mark Martin	Roush Racing	Ford
7	Alan Kulwicki	AK Racing	Ford
8	Rick Wilson	Stavola Brothers Racing	Buick
9	Bill Elliott	Melling Racing	Ford
10	Derrike Cope	Whitcomb Racing	Chevrolet
11	Geoff Bodine	Junior Johnson & Associates	Ford
12	Hut Stricklin	Bobby Allison Motorsports	Buick
15	Morgan Shepherd	Bud Moore Engineering	Ford
17	Darrell Waltrip	Darrell Waltrip Motorsports	Chevrolet
19	Chad Little	Little Racing	Ford
20	Bobby Hillin Jr.	Moroso Racing	Oldsmobile
21	Dale Jarrett	Wood Brothers Racing	Ford
22	Sterling Marlin	Junior Johnson & Associates	Ford
24	Mickey Gibbs	Team III Racing	Pontiac
25	Ken Schrader	Hendrick Motorsports	Chevrolet
26	Brett Bodine	King Racing	Buick
28	Davey Allison	Robert Yates Racing	Ford
30	Michael Waltrip	Bahari Racing	Pontiac
33	Harry Gant	Leo Jackson Motorsports	Oldsmobile
41	Larry Pearson	Larry Hedrick Motorsports	Chevrolet
42	Kyle Petty	SABCO Racing	Pontiac
43	Richard Petty	Petty Enterprises	Pontiac
47	Greg Sacks	Close Racing	Oldsmobile
49	Stanley Smith (R)	BS&S Motorsports	Buick
51	Jeff Purvis (R)	Phoenix Racing	Oldsmobile
52	Jimmy Means	Jimmy Means Racing	Pontiac
53	Donny Paul	Paul Racing	Chevrolet
55	Ted Musgrave (R)	U.S. Racing	Pontiac
59	Mark Gibson	Gibson Racing	Pontiac
65	Dave Mader III	Bahre Racing	Pontiac
66	Lake Speed	Cale Yarborough Motorsports	Pontiac
68	Bobby Hamilton (R)	TriStar Motorsports	Oldsmobile
70	J. D. McDuffie	McDuffie Racing	Pontiac
71	Dave Marcis	Marcis Auto Racing	Chevrolet
73	Phil Barkdoll	Barkdoll Racing	Oldsmobile
75	Joe Ruttman	RahMoc Enterprises	Oldsmobile
77	Ken Ragan	Branch-Ragan Racing	Ford
88	Buddy Baker	Moroso Racing	Oldsmobile
90	Wally Dallenbach Jr. (R)	Donlavey Racing	Ford
94	Terry Labonte	Hagan Racing	Oldsmobile
98	Jimmy Spencer	Travis Carter Enterprises	Chevrolet

== Qualifying ==
Qualifying was split into two rounds. The first round was held on Thursday, May 2, at 4:30 PM EST. Each driver would have one lap to set a time. During the first round, the top 20 drivers in the round would be guaranteed a starting spot in the race. If a driver was not able to guarantee a spot in the first round, they had the option to scrub their time from the first round and try and run a faster lap time in a second round qualifying run, held on Saturday, May 3, at 4:30 PM EST. As with the first round, each driver would have one lap to set a time. For this specific race, positions 21-40 would be decided on time, and depending on who needed it, a select amount of positions were given to cars who had not otherwise qualified but were high enough in owner's points; up to two were given. If needed, a past champion who did not qualify on either time or provisionals could use a champion's provisional, adding one more spot to the field.

Ernie Irvan, driving for Morgan–McClure Motorsports, would win the pole, setting a time of 49.061 and an average speed of 195.186 miles per hour (314.121 km/h) in the first round.

Five drivers would fail to qualify.

=== Full qualifying results ===
Pos.	#	Driver	Team	Make	Time	Speed
1	4	Ernie Irvan	Morgan–McClure Motorsports	Chevrolet	49.061	195.186
2	33	Harry Gant	Leo Jackson Motorsports	Oldsmobile	49.117	194.963
3	42	Kyle Petty	SABCO Racing	Pontiac	49.145	194.852
4	28	Davey Allison	Robert Yates Racing	Ford	49.423	193.756
5	17	Darrell Waltrip	Darrell Waltrip Motorsports	Chevrolet	49.441	193.685
6	5	Ricky Rudd	Hendrick Motorsports	Chevrolet	49.538	193.306
7	2	Rusty Wallace	Penske Racing South	Pontiac	49.555	193.240
8	3	Dale Earnhardt	Richard Childress Racing	Chevrolet	49.576	193.158
9	9	Bill Elliott	Melling Racing	Ford	49.650	192.870
10	66	Lake Speed	Cale Yarborough Motorsports	Pontiac	49.652	192.862
11	11	Geoff Bodine	Junior Johnson & Associates	Ford	49.662	192.823
12	12	Hut Stricklin	Bobby Allison Motorsports	Buick	49.674	192.777
13	1	Rick Mast	Precision Products Racing	Oldsmobile	49.687	192.726
14	68	Bobby Hamilton (R)	TriStar Motorsports	Oldsmobile	49.699	192.680
15	7	Alan Kulwicki	AK Racing	Ford	49.703	192.664
16	26	Brett Bodine	King Racing	Buick	49.734	192.544
17	19	Chad Little	Little Racing	Ford	49.753	192.471
18	25	Ken Schrader	Hendrick Motorsports	Chevrolet	49.765	192.424
19	22	Sterling Marlin	Junior Johnson & Associates	Ford	49.778	192.374
20	30	Michael Waltrip	Bahari Racing	Pontiac	49.786	192.343
Failed to lock in Round 1
21	24	Mickey Gibbs	Team III Racing	Pontiac	49.793	192.316
22	21	Dale Jarrett	Wood Brothers Racing	Ford	49.842	192.127
23	10	Derrike Cope	Whitcomb Racing	Chevrolet	49.898	191.911
24	94	Terry Labonte	Hagan Racing	Oldsmobile	49.922	191.819
25	47	Greg Sacks	Close Racing	Oldsmobile	49.931	191.785
26	43	Richard Petty	Petty Enterprises	Pontiac	49.950	191.712
27	73	Phil Barkdoll	Barkdoll Racing	Oldsmobile	49.996	191.535
28	6	Mark Martin	Roush Racing	Ford	50.050	191.329
29	98	Jimmy Spencer	Travis Carter Enterprises	Chevrolet	50.102	191.130
30	8	Rick Wilson	Stavola Brothers Racing	Buick	50.126	191.039
31	49	Stanley Smith (R)	BS&S Motorsports	Buick	50.151	190.943
32	90	Wally Dallenbach Jr. (R)	Donlavey Racing	Ford	50.212	190.711
33	15	Morgan Shepherd	Bud Moore Engineering	Ford	50.230	190.643
34	75	Joe Ruttman	RahMoc Enterprises	Oldsmobile	50.310	190.340
35	20	Bobby Hillin Jr.	Moroso Racing	Oldsmobile	50.492	189.654
36	52	Jimmy Means	Jimmy Means Racing	Pontiac	50.519	189.552
37	88	Buddy Baker	Moroso Racing	Oldsmobile	50.626	189.152
38	55	Ted Musgrave (R)	U.S. Racing	Pontiac	50.772	188.608
39	51	Jeff Purvis (R)	Phoenix Racing	Oldsmobile	50.901	188.130
40	41	Larry Pearson	Larry Hedrick Motorsports	Chevrolet	50.982	187.831
Provisional
41	71	Dave Marcis	Marcis Auto Racing	Chevrolet	51.445	186.141
Failed to qualify
42	59	Mark Gibson	Gibson Racing	Pontiac	-*	-*
43	70	J. D. McDuffie	McDuffie Racing	Pontiac	-*	-*
44	77	Ken Ragan	Branch-Ragan Racing	Ford	-*	-*
45	65	Dave Mader III	Bahre Racing	Pontiac	-*	-*
46	53	Donny Paul	Paul Racing	Chevrolet	-*	-*
Official first round qualifying results
Official starting lineup

== Race results ==
Fin	St	#	Driver	Team	Make	Laps	Led	Status	Pts	Winnings
1	2	33	Harry Gant	Leo Jackson Motorsports	Oldsmobile	188	18	running	180	$81,950
2	5	17	Darrell Waltrip	Darrell Waltrip Motorsports	Chevrolet	188	6	running	175	$47,400
3	8	3	Dale Earnhardt	Richard Childress Racing	Chevrolet	188	112	running	175	$56,100
4	19	22	Sterling Marlin	Junior Johnson & Associates	Ford	188	4	running	165	$25,450
5	20	30	Michael Waltrip	Bahari Racing	Pontiac	188	3	running	160	$25,800
6	11	11	Geoff Bodine	Junior Johnson & Associates	Ford	188	0	running	150	$25,350
7	18	25	Ken Schrader	Hendrick Motorsports	Chevrolet	188	13	running	151	$19,150
8	9	9	Bill Elliott	Melling Racing	Ford	188	0	running	142	$21,500
9	29	98	Jimmy Spencer	Travis Carter Enterprises	Chevrolet	188	0	running	138	$17,300
10	13	1	Rick Mast	Precision Products Racing	Oldsmobile	187	0	running	134	$17,650
11	16	26	Brett Bodine	King Racing	Buick	187	0	running	130	$13,670
12	14	68	Bobby Hamilton (R)	TriStar Motorsports	Oldsmobile	186	0	running	127	$10,040
13	6	5	Ricky Rudd	Hendrick Motorsports	Chevrolet	186	2	running	129	$15,860
14	33	15	Morgan Shepherd	Bud Moore Engineering	Ford	186	0	running	121	$15,480
15	21	24	Mickey Gibbs	Team III Racing	Pontiac	186	0	running	118	$8,700
16	38	55	Ted Musgrave (R)	U.S. Racing	Pontiac	186	1	running	120	$9,860
17	35	20	Bobby Hillin Jr.	Moroso Racing	Oldsmobile	184	0	running	112	$8,965
18	41	71	Dave Marcis	Marcis Auto Racing	Chevrolet	184	0	running	109	$10,155
19	27	73	Phil Barkdoll	Barkdoll Racing	Oldsmobile	183	0	running	106	$6,665
20	36	52	Jimmy Means	Jimmy Means Racing	Pontiac	180	0	running	103	$8,555
21	31	49	Stanley Smith (R)	BS&S Motorsports	Buick	168	0	running	100	$6,140
22	4	28	Davey Allison	Robert Yates Racing	Ford	164	2	running	102	$14,720
23	12	12	Hut Stricklin	Bobby Allison Motorsports	Buick	157	0	running	94	$8,910
24	28	6	Mark Martin	Roush Racing	Ford	151	0	running	91	$15,305
25	30	8	Rick Wilson	Stavola Brothers Racing	Buick	149	0	running	88	$8,775
26	7	2	Rusty Wallace	Penske Racing South	Pontiac	146	0	running	85	$5,645
27	15	7	Alan Kulwicki	AK Racing	Ford	136	0	running	82	$12,590
28	23	10	Derrike Cope	Whitcomb Racing	Chevrolet	118	0	engine	79	$13,935
29	34	75	Joe Ruttman	RahMoc Enterprises	Oldsmobile	116	0	running	76	$8,330
30	39	51	Jeff Purvis (R)	Phoenix Racing	Oldsmobile	94	0	hub	73	$5,425
31	10	66	Lake Speed	Cale Yarborough Motorsports	Pontiac	79	0	crash	70	$8,045
32	1	4	Ernie Irvan	Morgan–McClure Motorsports	Chevrolet	71	18	crash	72	$15,740
33	3	42	Kyle Petty	SABCO Racing	Pontiac	70	9	crash	69	$14,410
34	32	90	Wally Dallenbach Jr. (R)	Donlavey Racing	Ford	70	0	crash	61	$5,180
35	22	21	Dale Jarrett	Wood Brothers Racing	Ford	70	0	crash	58	$7,850
36	37	88	Buddy Baker	Moroso Racing	Oldsmobile	70	0	crash	55	$5,120
37	24	94	Terry Labonte	Hagan Racing	Oldsmobile	70	0	crash	52	$7,715
38	17	19	Chad Little	Little Racing	Ford	70	0	crash	49	$5,635
39	25	47	Greg Sacks	Close Racing	Oldsmobile	39	0	piston	46	$5,555
40	26	43	Richard Petty	Petty Enterprises	Pontiac	2	0	crash	43	$5,500
41	40	41	Larry Pearson	Larry Hedrick Motorsports	Chevrolet	2	0	crash	40	$4,900
Failed to qualify
42		59	Mark Gibson	Gibson Racing	Pontiac					
43		70	J. D. McDuffie	McDuffie Racing	Pontiac					
44		77	Ken Ragan	Branch-Ragan Racing	Ford					
45		65	Dave Mader III	Bahre Racing	Pontiac					
46		53	Donny Paul	Paul Racing	Chevrolet					
Official race results

== Standings after the race ==
Drivers' Championship standings

	Pos	Driver	Points
1	1	Dale Earnhardt	1,366
1	2	Ricky Rudd	1,362 (-4)
1	3	Darrell Waltrip	1,281 (-85)
2	4	Michael Waltrip	1,188 (–178)
5	5	Harry Gant	1,185 (–181)
3	6	Ernie Irvan	1,183 (–183)
2	7	Davey Allison	1,157 (–209)
1	8	Ken Schrader	1,156 (–210)
1	9	Morgan Shepherd	1,132 (–234)
3	10	Mark Martin	1,118 (–248)
Official driver's standings

- Note: Only the first 10 positions are included for the driver standings.

Previous race: 1991 Hanes 500	NASCAR Winston Cup Series; 1991 season	Next race: 1991 Coca-Cola 600
