= Carolina Opry =

Coordinates: 33°45′50″N 78°48′27″W

The Carolina Opry
- Location: Myrtle Beach, South Carolina, United States
- Address: 8901 N. Kings Hwy. Myrtle Beach, South Carolina
- Opened: 1986; 40 years ago
- Owner: Calvin Gilmore

The Carolina Opry is a musical variety show located in Myrtle Beach, South Carolina.

== History ==
The Carolina Opry opened in Surfside Beach, South Carolina in 1986 and was founded by singer, producer and entrepreneur, Calvin Gilmore. The original venue was a 1,000-seat theater located one block from Main Street in Surfside Beach. As shows began to sell out nightly, a second show was opened in North Myrtle Beach, South Carolina as The Dixie Jubilee. Both shows began to sell out nightly and in 1993, the shows were consolidated under The Carolina Opry name in a new 2,200-seat theater located at the intersection of Highway 17 Business and Highway 17 Bypass next to the Pirates Voyage Fun, Feast & Adventure dinner theater in Myrtle Beach, South Carolina.

== Awards ==
- Received the Governor's Cup, the state of South Carolina's highest award for tourism
- Was designated the State's Most Outstanding Attraction by the SC Department of Parks, Recreation and Tourism
