= Kenny Allen (racing driver) =

American racing driver

- Nationality: American
- Born: Kenneth Allen; November 22, 1956 (age 69) Shelby, North Carolina, U.S.

ARCA Bondo/Mar-Hyde Series career
- Debut season: 1992
- Former teams: Kenny Allen
- Starts: 42
- Wins: 0
- Poles: 0
- Best finish: 10th in 1993
- Finished last season: 34th (1995)

NASCAR FedEx Freight Truck Series career
- 41 races run over 5 years
- First race: 1995 Sears Auto Center 125 (Milwaukee)
- Last race: 2000 Florida Dodge Dealers 400K (Homestead)
Wins	Top tens	Poles
0	1	0
- Statistics up to date as of July 19, 2020.

Kenneth Allen (born November 22, 1956) is an American former professional stock car racing driver in the Craftsman Truck Series. He earned one top ten finish in 41 career starts. Allen also raced in the ARCA Racing Series, where he finished tenth in points in 1993. In both series, he mostly drove for his family team, AAG Racing.

== Racing career ==
Allen made his series debut in 1995 running nine races, in his own No. 65 Chevrolet. His first start came at the Milwaukee Mile, where he qualified 27th, but came home with a solid 15th-place finish. In the other eight starts, he would take on three more top-20 finishes, the best being a 13th at Indianapolis Raceway Park.

Allen's best season came in 1996, where he made 20 of 24 races. In his return to Milwaukee, he finished tenth, his only career top-ten, but had seven other top-20 finishes. However, Allen's big problem was DNFs. In his twenty starts, he did not finish eight of them.

After sponsor ONSAT left, Allen only made ten starts in 1997. His best finish was only a 15th at Miami, but he also earned his first career top-ten start. He started the Texas race in 7th position.

Allen would only make one start in 1998, when he drove the No. 82 Ford for Core Motorsports at Texas, where he started 35th and finished 28th due to a crash. After not running any Truck races in 1999, Allen returned in 2000 and started the season with a DNQ at Daytona. Allen's only other race of the season came at Homestead-Miami Speedway, where he did qualify for the race but finished last on the field after transmission trouble. Both of these starts came in the No. 28 Chevrolet for Jim Rosenblum Racing, where he would also fail to qualify for Daytona with them the next two years. He never made another attempt in the series after that.

== Motorsports career results ==
=== NASCAR ===
==== Craftsman Truck Series ====
NASCAR Craftsman Truck Series results
Year	Team	No.	Make	1	2	3	4	5	6	7	8	9	10	11	12	13	14	15	16	17	18	19	20	21	22	23	24	25	26	27	NCTC	Pts	Ref
1995	AAG Racing	65	Chevy	PHO	TUS	SGS	MMR	POR	EVG	I70	LVL	BRI	MLW; 15	CNS; 20	HPT; 31	IRP; 13	FLM; 23	RCH; 26	MAR; 24	NWS; DNQ	SON; 17	MMR; 17	PHO; DNQ								27th	992	
1996	AAG Racing	65	Chevy	HOM; 34	PHO; DNQ	POR; 15	EVG; 17	TUS; 29	CNS; 21	HPT; 26	BRI; 15	NZH; 25	MLW; 10	LVL; 29	I70; 27	IRP	FLM; 16	GLN; 19	NSV; 30	RCH; 26	NHA; 28	MAR; 21	NWS; 36	SON; 14	MMR; 17	PHO; DNQ	LVS; DNQ				19th	2019	
1997	AAG Racing	65	Chevy	WDW; 17	TUS; DNQ	HOM; 15	PHO; 23	POR; 30	EVG; 20	I70; 21	NHA; 22	TEX; 28	BRI; 38	NZH	MLW	LVL	CNS; 28	HPT	IRP	FLM	NSV	GLN	RCH	MAR	SON	MMR	CAL	PHO	LVS		34th	911	
1998	Core Motorsports	82	Ford	WDW	HOM	PHO	POR	EVG	I70	GLN	TEX; 28	BRI	MLW	NZH	CAL	PPR	IRP	NHA	FLM	NSV	HPT	LVL	RCH	MEM	GTY	MAR	SON	MMR	PHO	LVS	99th	79	
2000	Jim Rosenblum Racing	28	Chevy	DAY; DNQ	HOM; 36	PHO	MMR	MAR	PIR	GTY	MEM	PPR	EVG	TEX	KEN	GLN	MLW	NHA	NZH	MCH	IRP	NSV	CIC	RCH	DOV	TEX	CAL				99th	83	
2001	Jim Rosenblum Racing	28	Chevy	DAY; DNQ	HOM	MMR	MAR	GTY	DAR	PPR	DOV	TEX	MEM	MLW	KAN	KEN	NHA	IRP	NSH	CIC	NZH	RCH	SBO	TEX	LVS	PHO	CAL				N/A	0	
2002	FDNY Racing	28	Chevy	DAY; DNQ	DAR	MAR	GTY	PPR	DOV	TEX	MEM	MLW	KAN	KEN	NHA	MCH	IRP	NSH	RCH	TEX	SBO	LVS	CAL	PHO	HOM						N/A	0	

=== ARCA Bondo/Mar-Hyde Series ===
(key) (Bold – Pole position awarded by qualifying time. Italics – Pole position earned by points standings or practice time. * – Most laps led.)

ARCA Bondo/Mar-Hyde Series results
Year	Team	No.	Make	1	2	3	4	5	6	7	8	9	10	11	12	13	14	15	16	17	18	19	20	21	ABMHSC	Pts	Ref
1992	AAG Racing	14	Buick	DAY	FIF	TWS	TAL	TOL; 17																	19th	1520	
1992	AAG Racing	4	Buick						KIL; 14																19th	1520	
1992	AAG Racing	3	Buick							POC; 34	MCH; 33	FRS	KIL	NSH; 18	DEL	POC; 14	HPT; 32	FRS	ISF	TOL; 14	DSF; 19				19th	1520	
1992	AAG Racing	3	Pontiac																			TWS; 44	SLM		19th	1520	
1992	AAG Racing	3	Chevy																					ATL; 35	19th	1520	
1993	AAG Racing	3	Chevy	DAY; 15	FIF; 23		TAL; 4	KIL; 17	CMS; 14	FRS; 21	TOL; 11	POC; 27	MCH; 36	FRS; 13	POC; 10	KIL; 17				SLM; 23		ATL; 42			10th	3420	
1993	AAG Racing	3	Pontiac														ISF; 42	DSF; 29	TOL; 24		WIN; 28				10th	3420	
1993	AAG Racing	31	Chevy			TWS; 34																			10th	3420	
1994	AAG Racing	3	Chevy	DAY; 25	TAL; 35	FIF	LVL	KIL	TOL	FRS	MCH; 20	DMS; 28	POC; 30	POC; 35	KIL	FRS	INF	I70	ISF	DSF	TOL	SLM	WIN	ATL; 9			
1995	AAG Racing	3	Chevy	DAY; 14	ATL; 4	TAL; 15	FIF	KIL	FRS	MCH; 12	I80	MCS	FRS	POC	POC	KIL	FRS	SBS	LVL	ISF	DSF	SLM	WIN	ATL; 34	34th	1010	
