= AK Racing =

Auto-racing company

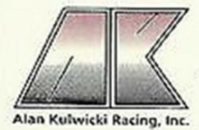
- Owner(s): Bill Terry, Alan Kulwicki
- Base: Concord, North Carolina
- Series: Winston Cup, Busch Series
- Race drivers: Alan Kulwicki
- Manufacturer: Ford
- Opened: 1982
- Closed: 1993

Career
- Drivers' Championships: 1
- Race victories: 5

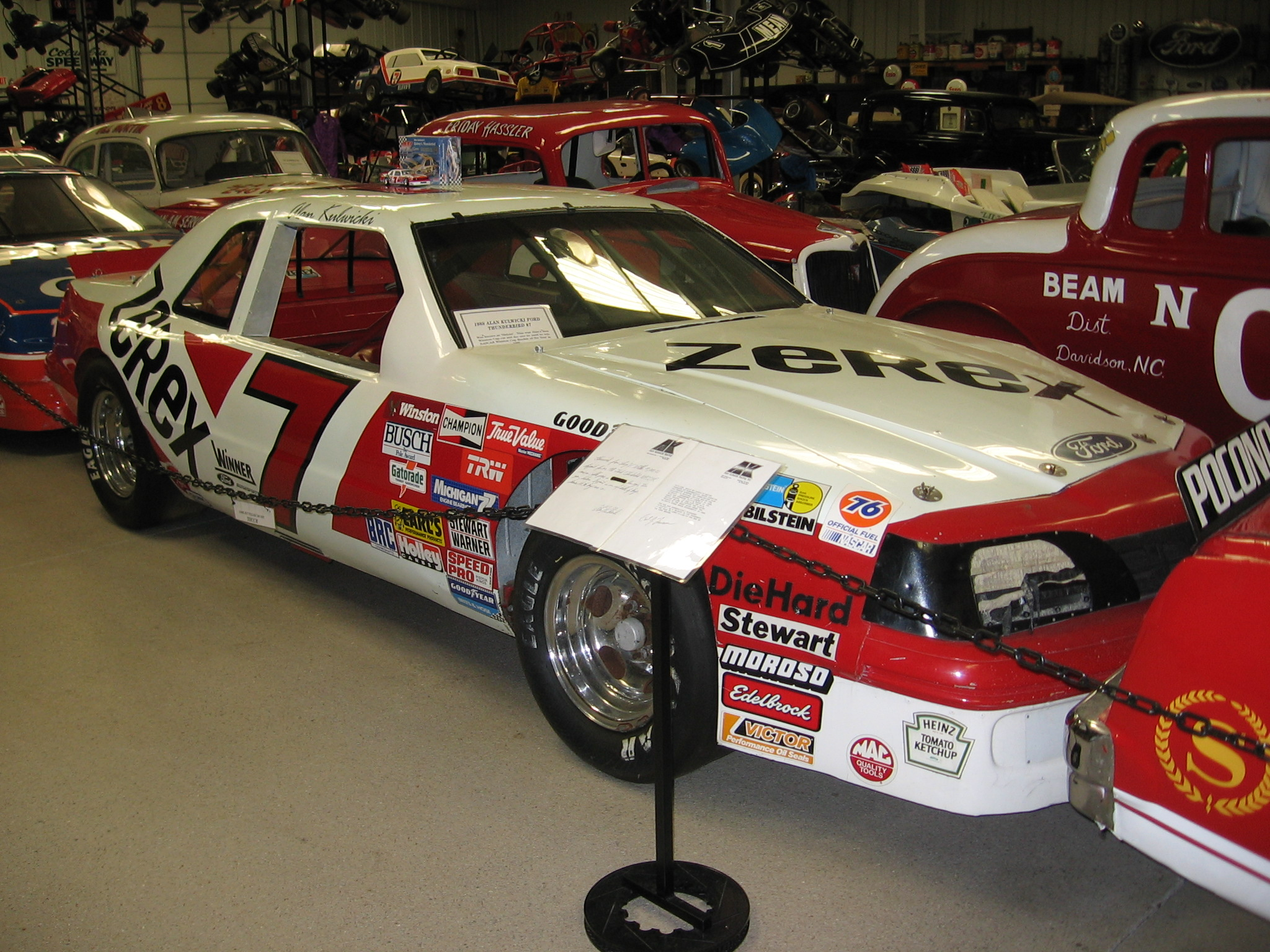
Kulwicki's 1988 car, the car he used for his Polish Victory Lap

Alan Kulwicki Racing, Inc., better known as AK Racing and originally known as Terry Motorsports. was a championship-winning NASCAR Winston Cup Series team. The team was founded by Bill Terry in 1982 and fielded Buicks for Bob Jarvis, Tommy Ellis, and Butch Lindley in 1982 and 1983. In 1985, Terry began fielding a Ford for Alan Kulwicki.

In 1986, Terry took his team full time, but backed out of the operation later in the year. Kulwicki bought out Terry and began running the team as an owner–driver. The team adopted the AK Racing name and raced under that banner until the end of the 1993 season, during which Kulwicki lost his life and Geoff Bodine purchased the team.

== Bill Terry era ==
The team debuted at the 1982 Cracker Barrel Country Store 420 at Nashville Speedway USA with Bob Jarvis driving it as the No. 32 Clinomint Buick, finishing 28th out of 30 cars. Two races later, the No. 32 ran again at the World 600, with Bosco Lowe qualifying 40th and finishing 16th. Lowe drove the car in the Daytona 500 the following season, finishing 39th after a crash. Tommy Ellis drove their next race, bringing the Big Daddy's Buick to a 15th-place finish at Charlotte. Butch Lindley drove the final race of the 1983 season for the team at Martinsville Speedway, finishing 25th after suffering rear end problems.

== Alan Kulwicki era ==
Terry's team did not run a race in 1984, but would return for another part time effort in 1985. Terry hired Alan Kulwicki, a driver in the ASA Series who had also made several starts in the Busch Series. The team switched their engine supplier to Ford and fielded cars #32 and #38 for the Wisconsin native in five races toward the end of the season, with a best finish of thirteenth at Charlotte. Terry then decided to go full time for the first time in 1986, with Kulwicki piloting the #32 and sponsorship from the restaurant chain Quincy's Family Steakhouse. After Kulwicki failed to qualify for two of the first three races, including the Daytona 500, Terry renumbered the car to #35 for the spring Atlanta race. Kulwicki would record his best career finish thus far shortly thereafter at Martinsville, finishing fourth. However, the team failed to qualify at Talladega, then ran poorly at Dover and Charlotte. After sitting out the spring races at Riverside and Pocono, Kulwicki returned at Michigan. He then avenged his DNQ at Daytona by running tenth at the 4th of July race, and would later record a top ten at Bristol.

After that race, Kulwicki and Terry agreed to have the driver purchase the team outright, and the newly renamed AK Racing moved its operations to Kannapolis, North Carolina. With the team now under his stewardship, Kulwicki ran the last nine races with eight finishes inside the top twenty. His best finish was seventh in the fall Dover race, with the worst being 27th in the season finale at Riverside. Despite missing six races and finishing behind Michael Waltrip, who ran all but one race (the Daytona 500, which like Kulwicki he failed to qualify for) in the series points, Kulwicki's performance was enough to earn him Rookie of the Year honors for 1986.

=== 1987-90 ===
For 1987, Kulwicki would renumber his car to #7, which he would run for the rest of his career. After Quincy's left as sponsor, Kulwicki signed on to carry Zerex Antifreeze on the car going forward. He won three pole positions and finished 15th in points. In 1988, Kulwicki won his first race career race at Phoenix International Raceway. In celebration, he drove the now-famous Polish Victory Lap. He won once more in 1990 at North Carolina Speedway and finished in the top ten in points for the first time, but lost his sponsorship after the season once Zerex's parent company decided to focus solely on promoting its Valvoline brand of lubricants.

=== 1991 ===
After rejecting overtures from Junior Johnson to drive for his team in the offseason, Kulwicki attempted to sign with Kraft General Foods for 1991, where he would carry its Maxwell House Coffee brand on the #7. Johnson, who had also tried to sign Kulwicki in 1990 but was unable to, retaliated by usurping him and taking the Maxwell House sponsorship for himself. This left Kulwicki sponsorless as the season got underway, and although he was able to gain sponsorship from the U.S. Army for the Daytona 500 as a promotional effort surrounding Operation Desert Storm, it was only for one race and the team ran unsponsored for the next two races.

Then, at the spring race at Atlanta, Kulwicki caught a much needed break. Atlanta was regarded as the home racetrack for the Hooters restaurant chain, and they had sponsored Mark Stahl's #82 Ford for the first three races of the season. Stahl had yet to qualify for a race, and did not do so at Atlanta, either. Kulwicki, meanwhile, qualified the unsponsored #7 on the pole, and Hooters approached him for a one race deal to put their logos on his car. Kulwicki finished in eighth that day, and shortly thereafter both sides agreed to terms on a long-term sponsorship. By the end of the season, Kulwicki was fourteenth in the standings and won the night race at Bristol; although he finished four places lower in the standings, the team had secure sponsorship again and 1992 would prove to be even more lucrative.

=== 1992 ===
In that season, Kulwicki won at Bristol in the spring and then won his first superspeedway race when he won at Pocono in the summer. He became a championship contender, challenging Davey Allison and Bill Elliott (who, incidentally, had been signed by the same Junior Johnson who Kulwicki had declined to race for the year earlier) for most of the season and staying somewhat consistent while both of his chief competitors, who recorded more victories, also dealt with mechanical issues and accidents. Entering the season finale at Atlanta, Kulwicki trailed Allison by thirty points. Feeling he was truly the biggest underdog among the drivers who had a chance to win the Winston Cup that afternoon (in addition, Kyle Petty, Harry Gant, and Mark Martin were also mathematically eligible), Kulwicki got permission from NASCAR and Ford to place stickers over the first two letters in the car’s branding on the front grille, which caused it to read "Underbird".

In the race, Martin, Petty, and Gant fell out of contention early. Then, Allison crashed on lap 254 and suffered severe damage to his car, leaving Kulwicki and Elliott to determine the championship for themselves. Kulwicki, who had been battling gearbox issues all day, managed to clinch the five point bonus for leading the most laps in the race; he led exactly one more lap than Elliott, who entered the race ten points behind Kulwicki in the standings. Kulwicki came to the finish in second place behind the race-winning Elliott, clinching the championship and becoming the first owner-driver since Richard Petty, who was making his final start that afternoon, won his last championship in 1979.

=== 1993 ===
Kulwicki started out the season with three top tens and two top fives, two of which were on the short tracks of Rockingham and Richmond. These were bookended by a 26th place finish in the Daytona 500, where he fell three laps down, and a 36th place finish in his return to Atlanta, where the "Underbird" car (which the team brought to the track) crashed out. The team finished sixth at Darlington, then began heading to Bristol, where Kulwicki was the defending race winner.

=== Blountville ===
On Thursday, April 1, Kulwicki was returning from a promotional appearance at a Hooters restaurant on Kingston Pike in Knoxville, Tennessee. He was scheduled to fly from Knoxville to Tri-Cities Regional Airport in Blountville, Tennessee that night, and boarded a Swearingen Merlin III twin-engine turboprop he leased from Hooters owner Bob Brooks. Two Hooters executives were also aboard the plane.

The plane departed Knoxville at 8:58 PM local time and was cleared for landing thirty minutes later. One minute after that, radio contact was lost with the pilot, and shortly after that, the aircraft began a rapid descent that was later determined to have been caused by icing conditions that triggered shutdown of its engines. It crashed and burst into flames nearly six miles outside of the airport, killing Kulwicki and the three others on board.

== After Kulwicki's death ==
=== Immediate aftermath ===
As per his will, Kulwicki left the team to his father, Gerald. The elder Kulwicki did not have any interest in running the team, so after consulting with his attorney, the team was placed under the stewardship of Felix Sabates, the owner of Team SABCO, while a buyer was sought. Crew chief Paul Andrews and the crew informed Gerald Kulwicki that they had no intention of stopping their work, as his son would have wanted them to continue as normal. Therefore, the day following the race at Bristol, the AK Racing shop reopened for business and began preparing for the team's intended return at Martinsville on April 25, taking the scheduled off week for Easter and skipping the spring race at North Wilkesboro.

Sabates received several offers immediately, but some were rejected outright because the potential buyers were only interested in the property that the race shop occupied. He did, however, receive offers from four Winston Cup Series drivers who were interested in forming their own owner-driver operation as Kulwicki had. One was his championship rival Bill Elliott, who had owned a car in the Busch Series off and on and was fielding a car for his nephew Casey in the series this particular year. Another was Ricky Rudd, whose contract to drive the #5 Tide Chevrolet for Hendrick Motorsports was expiring at the end of 1993. The other two were the Bodine brothers, Geoff and Brett. Geoff at the time was driving for Bud Moore Engineering in the #15 Motorcraft Ford, while Brett was driving for Kenny Bernstein's King Racing in the #26 Quaker State Ford.

In the interim, the #7 would need a driver to replace Kulwicki. He had said numerous times that if something were ever to happen to him that would prevent him from driving the car, be it injury, retirement, or a worst case scenario, Kulwicki wanted Jimmy Hensley to take his place. Hensley had just finished the 1992 season as the Winston Cup Rookie of the Year, driving a partial schedule for Cale Yarborough in his #66 Ford. As fate would have it, he was also available, as Hensley had only run three races as an injury replacement for Jimmy Means (like Kulwicki, an owner-driver) in the #52 NAPA Auto Parts Ford in 1993.

=== Hooters drops out ===
However, things were not all positive for AK Racing. In addition to sponsoring Kulwicki, Hooters was also sponsoring Loy Allen Jr. in the ARCA Series (and, coincidentally, had just signed on to be its title sponsor for 1993) as well as in the Busch Series, where he was driving for his father, Loy Sr.. Sabates, Gerald Kulwicki, the Allens, Bob Brooks, and several executives from Hooters met for five hours shortly after Bristol to discuss business. During the meeting, Brooks and Loy Allen Sr. broached the idea of Loy Jr. taking over the #7. Sabates said no.

This did not go over well with the Hooters contingent, who claimed that Sabates was breaching their contract with Kulwicki; in the agreement that was finalized after Atlanta in 1991, Hooters was given final approval rights over anyone that might have been chosen to drive the #7 as long as they were sponsor. Sabates countered by saying that the contract only gave "reasonable refusal" of driver candidates. Loy Allen Sr. claimed that Sabates was trying to sabotage his son's fledgling racing career by not offering him a Cup ride, to which Sabates pointed out that Loy Jr. had not had much experience to that point and pointed to his own team's rookie driver, Kenny Wallace, who had spent years in lower tier series developing his driving skills. Sabates felt that Allen was not yet able to perform to the standards Kulwicki had set for his team, and if Loy Sr. wanted his son to get a Cup ride that badly, he would be willing to sell him the team if he made a good enough offer; the elder Allen declined.

Hooters then suggested that Brooks be allowed to purchase the team, which Sabates refused; he also would not consider their other suggestion that the team shut down for the remainder of the year either. The idea had been to simply bring the car to the track but keep it parked behind the wall and not enter it in the race. However, this would have deprived the team of $200,000 in appearance fees, and they were not willing to lose that much money. When Sabates told Hooters of the four interested drivers mentioned previously, the executives rejected them outright as they were not seen to be good brand representatives.

Furthermore, this had not been the only trouble that the sides had gotten into as Kulwicki had been in contentious talks with Hooters even before his passing. Hooters' sponsorship was up for renewal soon and the two sides were nowhere near a resolution. Kulwicki had also been courting Anheuser-Busch to move its Budweiser sponsorship from Junior Johnson's team to his for 1994 and beyond. In addition, Hooters felt that once their arrangement would expire, they would not be able to pay Kulwicki enough to keep their spot as his primary sponsor as they felt other sponsors would flock to AK Racing and offer more money to carry their branding on the #7.

With Sabates not willing to budge on Allen, the tension from negotitating, and Brooks' grief over losing his son in the plane crash playing factors, Hooters announced that it would be pulling their sponsorship from the team after Bristol on April 12. They did so without informing Sabates first, as he found out secondhand through a local reporter. He later said that Hooters' decision had a significant impact on the team's value, and as a ripple effect it caused Rudd to withdraw his interest. (Rudd still managed to start his own team for 1994, bringing his sponsor with him and launching Rudd Performance Motorsports.) The team decided to return at North Wilkesboro, a week earlier than intended, carrying sponsorship from Bojangles Fried Chicken.

=== Remainder of 1993 ===
On May 12, 1993, Geoff Bodine was announced as the winning bidder. He was able to bring backing from The Family Channel, which signed on for a majority of the remainder of the season as primary sponsor. Due to his connections with the U.S. bobsled team through his work designing sleds for the team ahead of the 1994 Winter Olympics, he was also able to get backing from them for a few races. Other sponsors for the rest of the season included Matchbox Toys, Hanes, Purolator Filters, Cellular One, and the Carolina Opry.

Bodine assumed day-to-day operations for AK Racing while continuing to drive the #15 for Bud Moore. He retained Jimmy Hensley to drive the #7, hiring Tommy Kendall to pilot the car at Sears Point and Watkins Glen. Hensley ran through the fall race at Richmond, recording a ninth-place finish at Talladega and an eighth-place finish at the team's return to Bristol in August. Kendall managed to finish 22nd at Sears Point (which Bodine won driving the #15) and 25th at Watkins Glen.

Moore released Bodine from his contract after Richmond, and he took over his new purchase at Dover the next week. He recorded one top ten finish over the course of the rest of the season with a tenth at Rockingham. Bodine then finished in last place at Phoenix and then 39th at the series finale in Atlanta. The 1993 Hooters 500 would be the last race the team would run as AK Racing.

== Aftermath ==
Bodine would rename the team as Geoff Bodine Racing for 1994 and beyond. Although he was not able to keep The Family Channel on board, as they would move over to Roush Racing to sponsor Ted Musgrave in the #16 Ford, Bodine managed to secure sponsorship from Exide for two years. He would record three victories in 1994, but inconsistency dropped him to 17th in the final standings. Bodine drove for his operation until 1997, when he sold it to Checkers Drive-In founder Jim Mattei. The team was later sold again in 2000 to Jim Smith, who merged it with his Ultra Motorsports operation, and then again in 2005 to Robby Gordon, who changed the team's name to Robby Gordon Motorsports and ran it as an owner-driver until 2012 when he shut down his NASCAR operations.

Paul Andrews would stay with the #7 until the end of the 1996 season. He then went over to be the crew chief for Michael Kranefuss' #37 Ford driven by Jeremy Mayfield, then followed both of them to Penske Racing the next year after Roger Penske bought Kranefuss' team. In 1999 he was hired away from Penske by Dale Earnhardt to be the crew chief for his team's #1 Chevrolet, where he guided Steve Park to his two career Winston Cup victories. In 2002, Andrews replaced Frank Stoddard as Jeff Burton's crew chief for the #99 Ford, but was let go after four races in 2004. He then worked with Kyle Petty and Bobby Labonte at Petty Enterprises, Michael Waltrip at his own owner-driver team, and last worked with Scott Speed in 2012.

Tony Gibson, another member of Kulwicki's championship team winning crew, would find more success after he left Kulwicki. He was a part of Jeff Gordon's last three championship teams as a car chief, then eventually became a crew chief for Dale Earnhardt Jr., Ryan Newman, and Kurt Busch, leading them all to race victories.

Another member of Kulwicki's championship winning crew was future crew chief Brian Whitesell, who joined up with Gordon's team in 1993 and would work with Gibson on some of his championship teams. He would succeed Ray Evernham as Gordon's crew chief in 1999, and then became the team manager for the last champion #24 team.

All of the three other drivers who sought to buy the team after Kulwicki's death would eventually join him as owner drivers. Ricky Rudd would run his team as an owner-driver until the 1999 season, after which he lost his longtime sponsor Tide; he then closed the team and was signed to replace Kenny Irwin Jr. in the #28 Texaco-Havoline Ford for Robert Yates Racing, where he would run from 2000 until 2002.

While Brett Bodine would not become an owner-driver until 1996, he and Junior Johnson made an arrangement for 1995 where Bodine would take over for Bill Elliott in the #11 car while running the team's operations. This would lead to Bodine buying Johnson out at the end of the season and starting Brett Bodine Racing, where he fielded the #11 until 2003; coincidentally, Hooters would sign to sponsor the car for its final season.

Elliott, meanwhile, would buy into Charles Hardy's race team for 1995 and later purchase Hardy's stake the next year. The team would become Bill Elliott Racing, fielding the #94 Ford sponsored by McDonald's until the end of the 2000 season but failing to win any races despite two top ten points finishes. After that, Elliott sold the operation to Evernham, who was leading the return of Dodge into Winston Cup with his own factory-backed team, and took the seat of the #9 Dodge Intrepid; he would drive for Evernham full-time until 2003, recording the last four victories and last top ten points finish of his career, then temporarily resurrected his own team in 2004 on a limited basis before closing it again. Elliott then continued as a part-time driver until 2012, driving for various teams including Evernham's, as well as with Michael Waltrip and Joe Nemechek's owner-driver operations.

As far as Loy Allen Jr. was concerned, Hooters did indeed sponsor him in the Winston Cup Series beginning in 1994 with his ride with Tri-Star Motorsports in the #19 Ford. After he qualified in the pole for the Daytona 500, he failed to qualify for twelve of the next thirty races and finished 39th in points with a best finish of eleventh at the Coca-Cola 600. Allen and Hooters then moved over to replace McDonald's and Jimmy Spencer in Junior Johnson's #27 Ford for 1995, but Allen would be released after five races and replaced by Elton Sawyer for most of the remainder of the season. Allen would then suffer an injury in 1996 at Rockingham that derailed his racing career, and he was out of NASCAR after the 1999 season.

Jimmy Hensley, meanwhile, signed to drive for RaDiUs Racing in their #55 Ford but struggled. After recording a best finish of thirteenth at Darlington and failing to qualify seven other times, he was released and only ran twice more that season, once for Moroso Racing at Charlotte and once for Charles Hardy at the Atlanta finale, where he finished with his best overall position of twelfth. He never ran full-time in Winston Cup after that but found significant success in the Craftsman Truck Series, winning twice (once at Nashville Fairgrounds and once at Martinsville) and recording four top ten points finishes with a career best of sixth in 1998.

Hooters' most recent foray into NASCAR sponsorship was with Hendrick Motorsports as an associate sponsor for Chase Elliott, son of Bill. The team's relationship ended after the 2024 season, due to financial troubles plaguing the restaurant chain; Hooters would eventually file for bankruptcy in 2025.

=== Car No. 7 results ===
Year	Driver	No.	Make	1	2	3	4	5	6	7	8	9	10	11	12	13	14	15	16	17	18	19	20	21	22	23	24	25	26	27	28	29	30	NWCC	Pts
1982	Bob Jarvis	32	Buick	DAY	RCH	BRI	ATL	CAR	DAR	NWS; DNQ	MAR	TAL	NSV; 28	DOV																					
1982	Bosco Lowe	32	Buick												CLT; 16	POC	RSD	MCH	DAY	NSV	POC	TAL	MCH	BRI	DAR	RCH	DOV	NWS	CLT	MAR	CAR	ATL	RSD		
1983	Bosco Lowe	32	Buick	DAY; 39	RCH	CAR	ATL	DAR	NWS	MAR	TAL	NSV	DOV	BRI	CLT																				
1983	Tommy Ellis	32	Buick												CLT; 15	RSD	POC	MCH	DAY	NSV	POC	TAL	MCH	BRI	DAR	RCH	DOV								
1983	Butch Lindley	32	Buick																									MAR; 25	NWS	CLT	CAR	ATL	RSD		
1985	Alan Kulwicki	32	Ford	DAY	RCH	CAR	ATL	BRI	DAR	NWS	MAR	TAL	DOV	CLT	RSD	POC	MCH	DAY	POC	TAL	MCH	BRI	DAR	RCH; 19	DOV; 21	MAR	NWS								
1985	Alan Kulwicki	38	Ford																									CLT; 13	CAR; 27	ATL; 22	RSD				
1986	Alan Kulwicki	32	Ford	DAY; DNQ	RCH; DNQ	CAR; 15																													
1986	Alan Kulwicki	35	Ford				ATL; 14	BRI; 15	DAR; 11	NWS; 18	MAR; 4	TAL; DNQ	DOV; 23	CLT; 27	RSD	POC	MCH; 16	DAY; 10	POC; 22	TAL; 32	GLN	MCH; 14	BRI; 10												
1986	Alan Kulwicki	35	Ford																					DAR; 12	RCH; 15	DOV; 7	MAR; 13	NWS; 17	CLT; 14	CAR; 12	ATL; 18	RSD; 24			
1987	Alan Kulwicki	7	Ford	DAY; 15	CAR; 25	RCH; 6	ATL; 33	DAR; 14	NWS; 4	BRI; 5	MAR; 28	TAL; 34	CLT; 27	DOV; 15	POC; 30	RSD; 28	MCH; 31	DAY; 32	POC; 2	TAL; 23	GLN; 6	MCH; 6	BRI; 11	DAR; 40	RCH; 23	DOV; 14	MAR; 6	NWS; 7	CLT; 29	CAR; 18	RSD; 11	ATL; 6			
1988	Alan Kulwicki	7	Ford	DAY; 32	RCH; 21	CAR; 4	ATL; 39	DAR; 2	BRI; 19	NWS; 15	MAR; 20	TAL; 22	CLT; 3	DOV; 6	RSD; 38	POC; 27	MCH; 21	DAY; 40	POC; 8	TAL; 19	GLN; 19	MCH; 36	BRI; 5	DAR; 15	RCH; 5	DOV; 31	MAR; 2	CLT; 25	NWS; 29	CAR; 26	PHO; 1	ATL; 25		17th	3176
1989	Alan Kulwicki	7	Ford	DAY; 7	CAR; 2	ATL; 16	RCH; 2	DAR; 7	BRI; 20	NWS; 2	MAR; 22	TAL; 13	CLT; 23*	DOV; 25	SON; 36	POC; 34	MCH; 36	DAY; 5	POC; 39	TAL; 30	GLN; 39	MCH; 10	BRI; 2	DAR; 32	RCH; 15	DOV; 32	MAR; 26	CLT; 28	NWS; 11	CAR; 9	PHO; 11*	ATL; 13		16th	3236
1990	Alan Kulwicki	7	Ford	DAY; 35	RCH; 24	CAR; 27	ATL; 8	DAR; 23	BRI; 31	NWS; 11	MAR; 25	TAL; 13	CLT; 6	DOV; 24	SON; 11	POC; 34	MCH; 6	DAY; 2	POC; 17	TAL; 4	GLN; 11	MCH; 11	BRI; 6	DAR; 3	RCH; 26	DOV; 29	MAR; 6	NWS; 9	CLT; 5	CAR; 1	PHO; 6	ATL; 8		10th	3599
1991	Alan Kulwicki	7	Ford	DAY; 8	RCH; 5	CAR; 17	ATL; 8	DAR; 34	BRI; 26	NWS; 29	MAR; 9	TAL; 27	CLT; 35	DOV; 14	SON; 17	POC; 16	MCH; 24	DAY; 14	POC; 16	TAL; 16	GLN; 23	MCH; 8	BRI; 1	DAR; 35	RCH; 6	DOV; 24	MAR; 22	NWS; 10	CLT; 3	CAR; 33	PHO; 4	ATL; 9		14th	3354
1992	Alan Kulwicki	7	Ford	DAY; 4	CAR; 31	RCH; 2	ATL; 7	DAR; 18	BRI; 1*	NWS; 7*	MAR; 16*	TAL; 6	CLT; 7	DOV; 12	SON; 14	POC; 1*	MCH; 3	DAY; 30	POC; 3	TAL; 25	GLN; 7	MCH; 14	BRI; 8	DAR; 8	RCH; 15	DOV; 34	MAR; 5	NWS; 12	CLT; 2	CAR; 12	PHO; 4	ATL; 2*		1st	4078
1993	Alan Kulwicki	7	Ford	DAY; 26	CAR; 4	RCH; 3	ATL; 36	DAR; 6	BRI; Wth																									22nd	2403
1993	Jimmy Hensley	7	Ford							NWS; 12	MAR; 13	TAL; 9		CLT; 15	DOV; 22	POC; 17	MCH; 23	DAY; 34	NHA; 11	POC; 39	TAL; 28		MCH; 15	BRI; 6	DAR; 23	RCH; 21	DOV	MAR	NWS	CLT	CAR	PHO	ATL	22nd	2403
1993	Tommy Kendall	7	Ford										SON; 22									GLN; 25												22nd	2403
