= Rick Wilson (racing driver) =

American racing driver (born 1953)

- Born: January 31, 1953 (age 73); Bartow, Florida, U.S.

NASCAR Cup Series career
- 206 races run over 14 years
- Best finish: 17th (1989)
- First race: 1980 Firecracker 400 (Daytona)
- Last race: 1997 UAW-GM Quality 500 (Charlotte)
Wins	Top tens	Poles
0	23	1

NASCAR O'Reilly Auto Parts Series career
- 47 races run over 8 years
- Best finish: 29th (1989)
- First race: 1985 Winn-Dixie 300 (Charlotte)
- Last race: 1997 All Pro 300 (Charlotte)
- First win: 1989 Budweiser 200 (Bristol)
- Last win: 1989 Budweiser 200 (Dover)
Wins	Top tens	Poles
2	11	1
- Statistics up to date as of November 29, 2012.

Rick Wilson (born January 31, 1953) is an American former NASCAR Winston Cup driver. He began racing in 1980, and posted 23 top-ten finishes over his career. NASCAR's website says that he is probably best known for his "close, side-by-side second to Bill Elliott in Daytona's summer event in 1988." He was also known for taking over Richard Petty's car at Petty Enterprises after Petty retired in a car numbered 44.

== Career ==
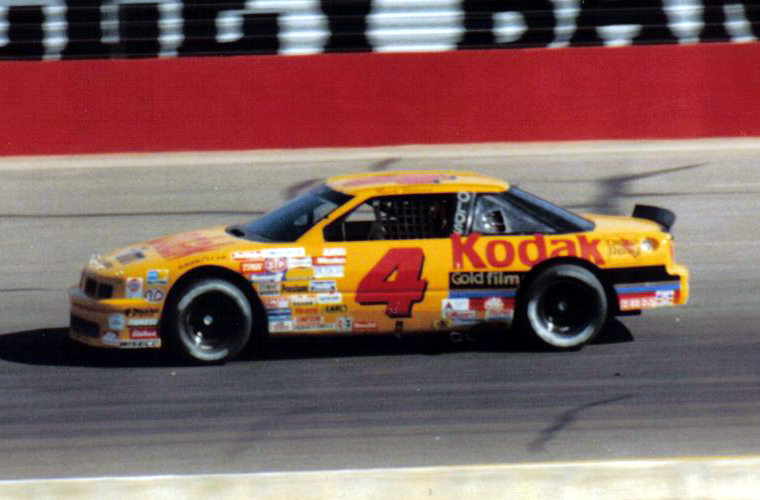
Wilson's 1989 Winston Cup Series car

Wilson's most successful run came from 1986 until 1989, driving the No. 4 car for Morgan-McClure Motorsports, when he was a consistent top-twenty driver and won his only pole position, at Bristol Motor Speedway. Wilson also famously narrowly lost the 1988 Pepsi 400 to Bill Elliott, which was the best finish, at the time, for MMM. Wilson competed in the 1988 NASCAR Christmas 500 at the Calder Park Thunderdome, where he finished fifth. In 1990, he drove for RahMoc Enterprises and followed that up with a year with Stavola Brothers Racing. Following the 1992 Daytona 500, he was fired from his ride with the Stavola Brothers. Wilson was tabbed by Richard Petty to replace him at Petty Enterprises following the 1992 season. Wilson also raced several years in the Busch Series driving for the Abingdon-based Food Country No. 75 Oldsmobile operated by Henderson Motorsports. He won two races, Bristol, and Dover, both in 1989. The Bristol race he won was postponed due to snow, and ran on a Monday. Wilson led 161 of the 200 laps ran on his way to victory. Wilson started second in 1989 at Martinsville, leading 160 of the 200 laps before blowing a motor and finishing 21st. Wilson has not raced in NASCAR since 1998.

Wilson won the Scotts EZ Seed Showdown in 2010; a race against other retired NASCAR drivers. He returned to active competition for a single race in the USARacing Pro Cup Series at Bristol later that year, finishing nineteenth following an accident.

== Personal life ==
Wilson continues to live on his family’s cattle ranch and work as a business owner in his home of Bartow, Florida. He is married to wife, Teresa and has three children Erin, Travis and Lori Ann.

Wilson was elected to the Polk County Commission on August 28, 2018 after soundly beating his opponent, Kathryn Gates-Skipper, by an almost 2 to 1 vote. His elected term was to begin on November 20, 2018. However, Wilson was appointed by Florida Governor Rick Scott to begin serving early when the sitting commissioner resigned and was sworn in on October 2, 2018.

== Motorsports career results ==
=== NASCAR ===
(key) (Bold – Pole position awarded by qualifying time. Italics – Pole position earned by points standings or practice time. * – Most laps led.)

==== Winston Cup Series ====
NASCAR Winston Cup Series results
Year	Team	No.	Make	1	2	3	4	5	6	7	8	9	10	11	12	13	14	15	16	17	18	19	20	21	22	23	24	25	26	27	28	29	30	31	32	33	NWCC	Pts	Ref
1980	Wilson Racing	62	Olds	RSD	DAY	RCH	CAR	ATL	BRI	DAR	NWS	MAR	TAL	NSV	DOV	CLT	TWS	RSD	MCH	DAY; 15	NSV	POC	TAL; 36	MCH	BRI	DAR	RCH	DOV	NWS	MAR							68th	225	
1980	Wilson Racing	62	Chevy																												CLT; 37	CAR	ATL	ONT			68th	225	
1981	Wilson Racing	62	Olds	RSD	DAY; DNQ	RCH	CAR; 35	ATL	BRI	NWS	DAR	MAR	TAL; 25	NSV	DOV	CLT; 42	TWS	RSD	MCH; 37	DAY; 42	NSV	POC	TAL; 20	MCH	BRI	DAR	RCH	DOV	MAR	NWS	CLT; 13	CAR	ATL; 11	RSD			41st	639	
1982	Wilson Racing	62	Olds	DAY; 18	RCH	BRI	ATL; 9	CAR	DAR	NWS	MAR	TAL; 32	NSV	DOV															CLT; 10	MAR	CAR	ATL; 27	RSD				34th	731	
1982	Wilson Racing	62	Buick												CLT; 36	POC	RSD	MCH	DAY; 33	NSV	POC	TAL; 27	MCH	BRI	DAR	RCH	DOV	NWS									34th	731	
1983	Wilson Racing	62	Buick	DAY; DNQ	RCH	CAR	ATL	DAR	NWS	MAR	TAL; 37	NSV	DOV	BRI	CLT	RSD	POC	MCH	DAY	NSV	POC	TAL	MCH	BRI	DAR	RCH	DOV	MAR	NWS	CLT	CAR	ATL	RSD				98th	52	
1985	Wawak Racing	74	Chevy	DAY	RCH	CAR	ATL	BRI	DAR	NWS	MAR	TAL	DOV	CLT	RSD	POC	MCH	DAY	POC	TAL; 29	MCH	BRI	DAR	RCH	DOV	MAR	NWS	CLT	CAR								75th	109	
1985	Ellington Racing	21	Chevy																											ATL; 18	RSD						75th	109	
1986	Morgan-McClure Motorsports	4	Olds	DAY; 7	RCH	CAR	ATL; 39	BRI; 12	DAR; 15	NWS	MAR						MCH; 8	DAY; 21	POC; 10	TAL; 11	GLN; 23	MCH; 40	BRI; 26	DAR; 28	RCH	DOV; 32	MAR	NWS	CLT; 29	CAR	ATL; 14	RSD; 40					28th	1698	
1986	Morgan-McClure Motorsports	4	Chevy									TAL; 8	DOV	CLT	RSD	POC																					28th	1698	
1987	Morgan-McClure Motorsports	4	Olds	DAY; 37	CAR	RCH	ATL; 11	DAR; 34	NWS	BRI	MAR	TAL; 20	CLT; 30	DOV; 29	POC	RSD; 14	MCH; 30	DAY; 30	POC; 40	TAL; 16	GLN; 21	MCH; 12	BRI; 7	DAR; 28	RCH	DOV; 27	MAR	NWS	CLT; 30	CAR	RSD; 18	ATL; 27					28th	1723	
1988	Morgan-McClure Motorsports	4	Olds	DAY; 15	RCH; DNQ	CAR; 36	ATL; 10	DAR; 27	**BRI**; 25	NWS; 28	MAR; 25	TAL; 35	CLT; 18*	DOV; 7	RSD; 33	POC; 25	MCH; 41	DAY; 2	POC; 13	TAL; 4	GLN; 12	MCH; 9	BRI; 23	DAR; 38	RCH; 33	DOV; 24	MAR; 16	CLT; 25	NWS; 20	CAR; 22	PHO; 29	ATL; 17					21st	2762	
1989	Morgan-McClure Motorsports	4	Olds	DAY; 8	CAR; 17	ATL; 6	RCH; 17	DAR; 11	BRI; 21	NWS; 30	MAR; 4	TAL; 15	CLT; 35	DOV; 14	SON; 8	POC; 27	MCH; 6	DAY; 29	POC; 25	TAL; 5	GLN; 8	MCH; 32	BRI; 27	DAR; 11	RCH; 22	DOV; 19	MAR; 18	CLT; 41	NWS; 29	CAR; 13	PHO; 40	ATL; 18					17th	3119	
1990	RahMoc Enterprises	75	Olds	DAY; 30	RCH; 30	CAR; 18	ATL; 17	DAR; 29		NWS; 22	MAR; 27	TAL; 39	CLT; 19		SON; 10	POC; 35	MCH; 10	DAY; 39	POC; 31	TAL; 35	GLN; 32	MCH; 29	BRI; 32	DAR; 12	RCH; 20	DOV; 27	MAR; 20	NWS; 18			PHO; 19	ATL; 33					23rd	2666	
1990	RahMoc Enterprises	75	Pontiac						BRI; 5					DOV; 23															CLT; 11	CAR; 18							23rd	2666	
1991	Stavola Brothers Racing	8	Buick	DAY; 33	RCH; 18	CAR; 19	ATL; 12	DAR; 14	BRI; 33	NWS; 27	MAR; 22	TAL; 25	CLT; 18	DOV; 25	SON; 16	POC; 13	MCH; 31	DAY; 24	POC; 24	TAL; 38	GLN; 19	MCH; 39	BRI; 20	DAR; 13	RCH; 13	DOV; 29	MAR; 26	NWS; 32	CLT; 17	CAR; 20	PHO; 15	ATL; 33					26th	2723	
1992	Stavola Brothers Racing	8	Ford	DAY; 23	CAR	RCH	ATL	DAR	BRI	NWS	MAR	TAL	CLT	DOV	SON	POC	MCH	DAY	POC	TAL	GLN	MCH	BRI	DAR	RCH	DOV	MAR	NWS	CLT	CAR	PHO	ATL					73rd	94	
1993	Petty Enterprises	44	Pontiac	DAY; 34	CAR; 17	RCH; 25	ATL; 24	DAR; 26	BRI; 25	NWS; 23	MAR; 17	TAL; 16	SON; 8	CLT; 32	DOV; 11	POC; 12	MCH; 34	DAY; 11	NHA; 28	POC; 21	TAL; 23	GLN; 22	MCH; 28	BRI; 28	DAR; 30	RCH; 29	DOV; 34	MAR	NWS; 33	CLT; 36	CAR; 26	PHO; 20	ATL; 23				28th	2647	
1997	David Blair Motorsports	27	Ford	DAY	CAR	RCH	ATL	DAR	TEX; DNQ	BRI	MAR	SON	TAL	CLT	DOV	POC	MCH; 21	CAL	DAY	NHA	POC	IND; 21	GLN	MCH	BRI	DAR	RCH	NHA	DOV	MAR	CLT; 19	TAL	CAR	PHO	ATL		53rd	306	
1998	SBIII Motorsports	58	Ford	DAY	CAR	LVS	ATL	DAR	BRI	TEX	MAR	TAL	CAL	CLT	DOV	RCH	MCH	POC	SON	NHA	POC	IND	GLN; DNQ	MCH	BRI	NHA	DAR	RCH	DOV	MAR	CLT						NA	-	
1998	Larry Hedrick Motorsports	41	Chevy																													TAL; DNQ	DAY; DNQ	PHO	CAR	ATL	NA	-	

===== Daytona 500 =====
Year	Team	Manufacturer	Start	Finish
1981	Wilson Racing	Oldsmobile	DNQ	
1982	Wilson Racing	Oldsmobile	13	18
1983	Wilson Racing	Buick	DNQ	
1986	Morgan-McClure Motorsports	Oldsmobile	16	7
1987	Morgan-McClure Motorsports	Oldsmobile	9	37
1988	Morgan-McClure Motorsports	Oldsmobile	13	15
1989	Morgan-McClure Motorsports	Oldsmobile	40	8
1990	RahMoc Enterprises	Oldsmobile	28	30
1991	Stavola Brothers Racing	Buick	26	33
1992	Stavola Brothers Racing	Ford	38	23
1993	Petty Enterprises	Pontiac	15	34

==== Busch Series ====
NASCAR Busch Series results
Year	Team	No.	Make	1	2	3	4	5	6	7	8	9	10	11	12	13	14	15	16	17	18	19	20	21	22	23	24	25	26	27	28	29	30	31	NBSC	Pts	Ref
1985	Wilson Racing	69	Olds	DAY	CAR	HCY	BRI	MAR	DAR	SBO	LGY	DOV	CLT; 30	SBO	HCY	ROU	IRP	SBO	LGY	HCY	MLW	BRI	DAR; 27	RCH	NWS	ROU	CLT; 41	HCY	CAR	MAR					61st	195	
1986	Wilson Racing	69	Olds	DAY	CAR	HCY	MAR	BRI	DAR; 4	SBO	LGY	JFC	DOV	CLT	SBO	HCY	ROU	IRP	SBO	RAL	OXF	SBO	HCY	LGY	ROU	BRI	DAR	RCH	DOV	MAR	ROU	CLT	CAR	MAR	134th	-	
1989	Henderson Motorsports	75	Olds	DAY; 6	CAR; 27	MAR; 21*	HCY	DAR; 5	**BRI**; 1*	NZH; 26	SBO	LAN	NSV	CLT; 42	DOV; 1*	ROU	LVL	VOL	MYB	SBO	HCY	DUB	IRP	ROU	BRI; 30	DAR; 34	RCH; 24	DOV	MAR	CLT; 28	CAR	MAR			29th	1273	
1990	Whitaker Racing	7	Buick	DAY	RCH	CAR	MAR	HCY	DAR	BRI; 29	LAN	SBO	NZH	HCY	CLT	DOV	ROU	VOL	MYB	OXF	NHA	SBO	DUB	IRP	ROU	BRI	DAR	RCH	DOV	MAR	CLT	NHA	CAR	MAR	112th	-	
1992	Henderson Motorsports	77	Olds	DAY	CAR	RCH	ATL	MAR	DAR	BRI	HCY	LAN	DUB	NZH	CLT	DOV	ROU	MYB	GLN	VOL	NHA	TAL	IRP	ROU	MCH	NHA	BRI; 6	DAR	RCH	DOV	CLT	MAR	CAR	HCY	88th	150	
1993	Henderson Motorsports	75	Olds	DAY	CAR	RCH	DAR	BRI	HCY	ROU	MAR	NZH	CLT	DOV; 36	MYB	GLN	MLW					BRI; 10		RCH; 16	DOV; 28	ROU									44th	722	
1993	Henderson Motorsports	75	Chevy															TAL; 39	IRP	MCH; 5	NHA		DAR; 37				CLT; 39	MAR	CAR	HCY	ATL; 41				44th	722	
1995	Henderson Motorsports	75	Ford	DAY; 17	CAR	RCH	ATL; 9	NSV; 13	DAR; 14	BRI; 27	HCY	NHA; 43	NZH	CLT; 32	DOV	MYB	GLN	MLW	TAL; 8	SBO	IRP	MCH; 41	BRI; 32	DAR; 22	RCH; 21	DOV; 38	CLT; DNQ	CAR; DNQ	HOM						35th	1173	
1997	Henderson Motorsports	75	Chevy	DAY	CAR	RCH	ATL; 19	LVS	DAR; 36	HCY	TEX	BRI; 27	NSV; 36	TAL	NHA	NZH	CLT; 18	DOV	SBO	GLN	MLW	MYB	GTY	IRP	MCH	BRI; 5	DAR; DNQ	RCH	DOV	CLT; 36	CAL	CAR; DNQ	HOM		50th	617	
1998		50		DAY	CAR	LVS	NSV	DAR	BRI	TEX	HCY	TAL; DNQ	NHA	NZH	CLT	DOV	RCH	PPR	GLN	MLW	MYB	CAL	SBO	IRP	MCH	BRI	DAR	RCH	DOV	CLT	GTY	CAR	ATL	HOM	NA	-	

==== Craftsman Truck Series ====
NASCAR Craftsman Truck Series results
Year	Team	No.	Make	1	2	3	4	5	6	7	8	9	10	11	12	13	14	15	16	17	18	19	20	21	22	23	24	25	26	27	NCTC	Pts	Ref
1998	M-R Motorsports	04	Chevy	WDW	HOM	PHO	POR	EVG	I70	GLN	TEX	BRI	MLW	NZH	CAL	PPR	IRP	NHA	FLM	NSV	HPT	LVL	RCH; DNQ	MEM	GTY	MAR	SON	MMR	PHO	LVS	123rd	-	

=== ARCA Permatex SuperCar Series ===
(key) (Bold – Pole position awarded by qualifying time. Italics – Pole position earned by points standings or practice time. * – Most laps led.)

ARCA Permatex SuperCar Series results
Year	Team	No.	Make	1	2	3	4	5	6	7	8	9	10	11	12	13	14	15	16	APSC	Pts	Ref
1984	Wilson Racing	6	Buick	DAY; 1	ATL; 2															NA	-	
1984	Wilson Racing	6	Chevy			TAL; 30	CSP	SMS	FRS	MCS	LCS	IRP	TAL	FRS	ISF	DSF	TOL	MGR		NA	-	
1985	Wilson Racing	6	Chevy	**ATL**; 16	DAY; 36	**ATL**; 28	TAL	ATL	SSP	IRP	CSP	FRS	IRP	OEF	ISF	DSF	TOL			52nd	-	
1986	Gray Racing	6	Chevy	ATL; 34	DAY	ATL	TAL	SIR	SSP	FRS	KIL	CSP	TAL	BLN	ISF	DSF	TOL	MCS	ATL	120th	-	
