= IROC XXI =

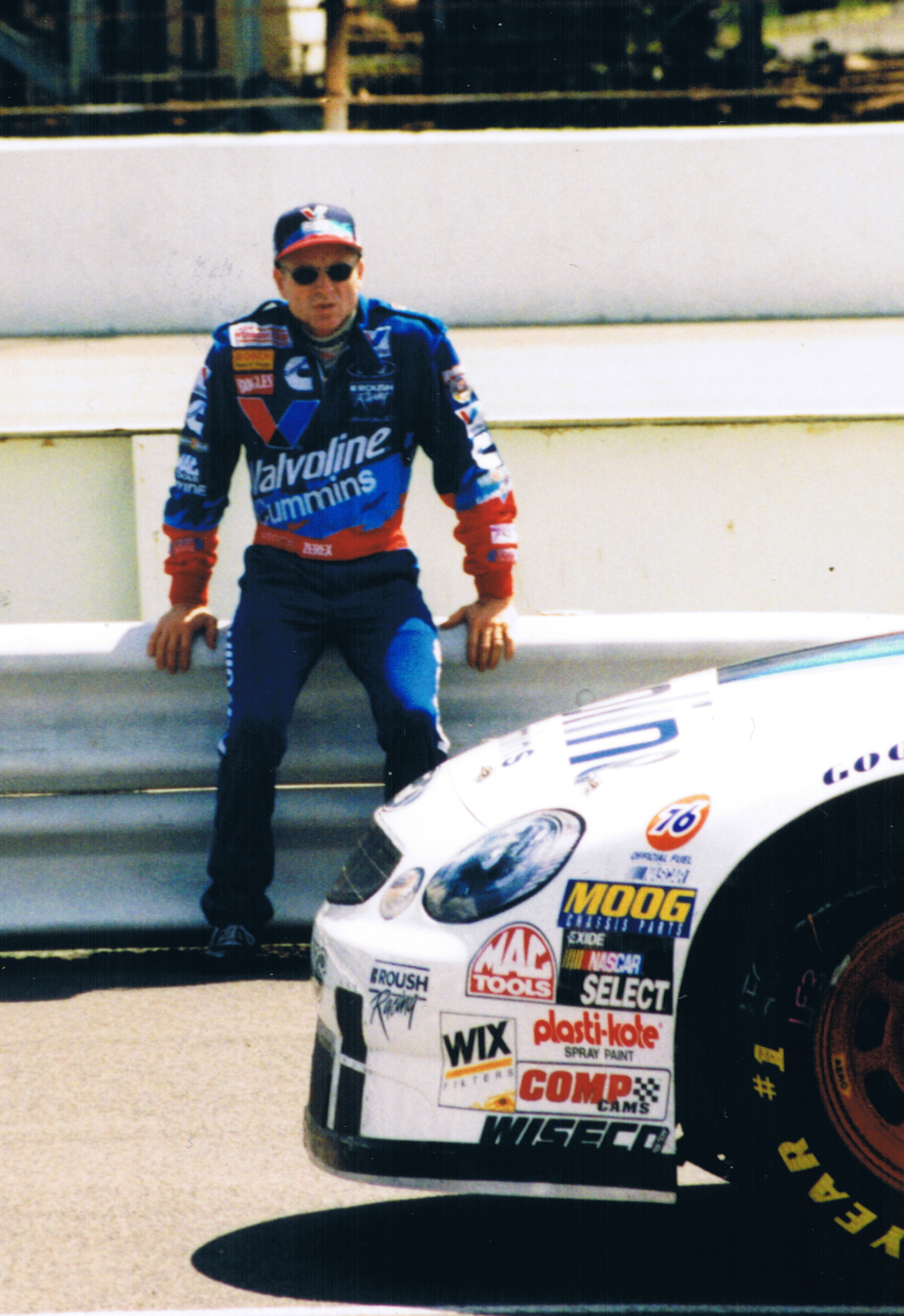
Mark Martin (seen in 1998), the IROC XXI champion

IROC XXI was the twenty-first season of the International Race of Champions, which started on February 17, 1997. The series used identically prepared Pontiac Firebird Trans Am race cars, and contested races at Daytona International Speedway, Charlotte Motor Speedway, California Speedway, and Michigan International Speedway. Mark Martin won $225,000 and the IROC championship, his second straight win and third in four seasons.

The roster of drivers and final points standings were as follows:

Position	Driver	Points	Winnings	Series
1	(United States) Mark Martin	72	$225,000	NASCAR Winston Cup
2	(United States) Robby Gordon	63	$100,000	CART, SCORE
3	(United States) Randy LaJoie	58	$60,000	NASCAR Busch Series
4	(United States) Al Unser Jr.	57	$50,000	CART
5	(United States) Terry Labonte	43	$45,000	NASCAR Winston Cup
6	(United States) Jeff Gordon	39	$40,000	NASCAR Winston Cup
7	(United States) Dale Earnhardt	35	$40,000	NASCAR Winston Cup
8	(United States) Dale Jarrett	34	$40,000	NASCAR Winston Cup
9	(United States) Tommy Kendall	34	$40,000	SCCA Trans-Am Series
10	(United States) Jimmy Vasser	30	$40,000	CART
11	(United States) Darrell Waltrip	18	$40,000	NASCAR Winston Cup
12	(Italy) Alex Zanardi	17	$40,000	CART

== Race results ==
=== Daytona International Speedway, Race One ===
1. Al Unser Jr.
2. Mark Martin
3. Dale Earnhardt
4. Randy LaJoie
5. Tommy Kendall
6. Terry Labonte
7. Dale Jarrett
8. Robby Gordon
9. Jeff Gordon
10. Alex Zanardi
11. Darrell Waltrip
12. Jimmy Vasser

=== Charlotte Motor Speedway, Race Two ===
1. Mark Martin
2. Robby Gordon
3. Jeff Gordon
4. Jimmy Vasser
5. Al Unser Jr.
6. Terry Labonte
7. Randy LaJoie
8. Dale Earnhardt
9. Tommy Kendall
10. Dale Jarrett
11. Darrell Waltrip
12. Alex Zanardi

=== California Speedway, Race Three ===
1. Mark Martin
2. Bobby Labonte ^{1}
3. Terry Labonte
4. Randy LaJoie
5. Jeff Gordon
6. Al Unser Jr.
7. Tommy Kendall
8. Dale Jarrett
9. Dale Earnhardt
10. Jimmy Vasser
11. Darrell Waltrip
12. Alex Zanardi

=== Michigan International Speedway, Race Four ===
1. Randy LaJoie
2. Robby Gordon
3. Dale Jarrett
4. Al Unser Jr.
5. Tommy Kendall
6. Terry Labonte
7. Dale Earnhardt
8. Mark Martin
9. Jeff Gordon
10. Jimmy Vasser
11. Darrell Waltrip
12. Alex Zanardi

== Notes ==
1. Bobby Labonte drove for Robby Gordon in Race 3.
