= Mark Martin =

American racing driver (born 1959)

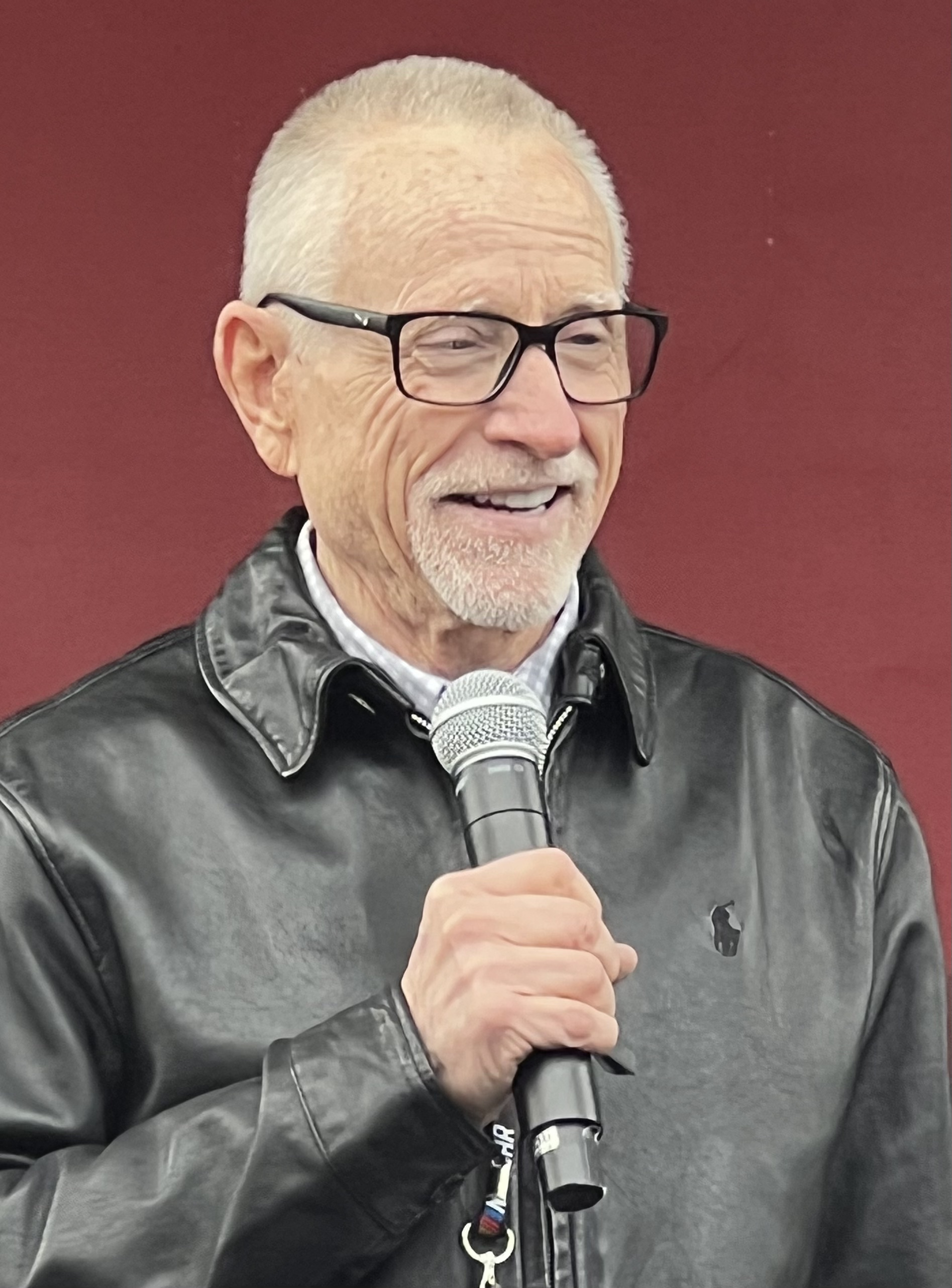
- Martin at Auto Club Speedway in 2023
- Born: Mark Anthony Martin; January 9, 1959 (age 67); Batesville, Arkansas, U.S.
- Achievements: 1994, 1996, 1997, 1998, 2005 IROC Champion; 1978, 1979, 1980, 1986 ASA National Tour Champion; 1993, 2009 Southern 500 Winner; 2002 Coca-Cola 600 Winner; 1995, 1997 Winston 500 Winner; 1998, 2005 NASCAR Nextel All-Star Challenge Winner; 1999 Bud Shootout Winner; 1985, 1986 Winchester 400 Winner; 1984 Slinger Nationals Winner
- Awards: 1977 ASA Rookie of the Year; Named one of NASCAR's 50 Greatest Drivers (1998); Motorsports Hall of Fame of America (2015); NASCAR Hall of Fame (2017); Named one of NASCAR's 75 Greatest Drivers (2023)

NASCAR Cup Series career
- 882 races run over 31 years
- 2013 position: 25th
- Best finish: 2nd (1990, 1994, 1998, 2002, 2009)
- First race: 1981 Northwestern Bank 400 (North Wilkesboro)
- Last race: 2013 Ford EcoBoost 400 (Homestead)
- First win: 1989 AC Delco 500 (Rockingham)
- Last win: 2009 Sylvania 300 (New Hampshire)
Wins	Top tens	Poles
40	453	56

NASCAR O'Reilly Auto Parts Series career
- 236 races run over 23 years
- Best finish: 8th (1987)
- First race: 1982 Kroger 200 (IRP)
- Last race: 2012 Sam's Town 300 (Las Vegas)
- First win: 1987 Budweiser 200 (Dover)
- Last win: 2011 Sam's Town 300 (Las Vegas)
Wins	Top tens	Poles
49	152	30

NASCAR FedEx Freight Truck Series career
- 25 races run over 5 years
- Best finish: 19th (2006)
- First race: 1996 Fas Mart SuperTruck Shootout (Richmond)
- Last race: 2011 VFW 200 (Michigan)
- First win: 1996 Lowe's 250 (North Wilkesboro)
- Last win: 2006 Ford 200 (Homestead)
Wins	Top tens	Poles
7	20	3

ARCA Menards Series career
- 1 race run over 1 year
- Best finish: 20th (1981)
- First race: 1981 Talladega ARCA 200 (Talladega)
- First win: 1981 Talladega ARCA 200 (Talladega)
Wins	Top tens	Poles
1	1	0

Mark Anthony Martin (born January 9, 1959), nicknamed "the Kid", is an American former stock car racing driver. He most notably drove the No. 6 Ford for Roush Racing for the majority of his career.

From 1989 to 2009, Martin recorded 40 NASCAR Cup Series victories, 35 of which were achieved with Roush Racing. He is frequently cited as one of the most accomplished drivers to never win a NASCAR Cup Series championship, having finished second in the overall standings five times (1990, 1994, 1998, 2002 and 2009) and third on four occasions.

Recognized for his longevity and consistent performance, Martin remained competitive into his early 50s, placing second in the 2009 NASCAR Sprint Cup Series standings at the age of 50.

Although considered a strong contender in multiple seasons, Martin failed to win the Daytona 500 in his career, despite several close attempts. In the O'Reilly's Series (formerly the Busch Series), he ranks second in all-time wins with 49. He also earned five International Race of Champions (IROC) titles and recorded thirteen race wins in the series, the highest total in its history. Martin was the final driver born in the 1950s to win a NASCAR Cup Series race.

== Early career ==
Martin was born in Batesville, Arkansas in 1959. He began his racing career at a young age on local dirt tracks before transitioning to asphalt competition and entering the ASA racing series. During his time in the ASA, he competed against notable drivers such as Dick Trickle, Jim Sauter, Joe Shear, and Bobby Allison. Martin earned the ASA National Tour Rookie of the Year Award in 1977 and went on to win 22 ASA races and four series championships, secured in 1978, 1979, 1980, and 1986.

== NASCAR career ==
=== 1981–1982 ===
Martin experienced an unsettled start to his NASCAR career, competing for six different teams between 1981 and 1987. He made five starts in 1981 with a team owned by Bud Reeder, earning pole positions at Nashville and Richmond and recording a third-place finish in his final race of the season at Martinsville.

Martin raced full-time in 1982 with the Bud Reeder team, supported by sponsorship from Apache Stove. As the season progressed, however, the team went bankrupt, and Martin did not receive payment. He was competing for Rookie of the Year honors that year. Overall, the team struggled for consistency, recording eight top-ten finishes but twelve DNFs in thirty starts, including a stretch of five DNFs in six races. Martin completed only 73.7% of the season's laps and led just four laps, resulting in a 14th-place finish in the final standings and a second-place result in the Rookie of the Year competition behind Geoff Bodine.

Despite ending the season with improved performances, including two top-ten finishes in the final two races and a fifth-place result at Riverside, Martin and Reeder parted ways after the season. He remains the only driver to have competed in more than six races for a team owned or co-owned by Reeder. At the conclusion of the season, Martin sold off his equipment and signed with Jim Stacy to compete in 1983.

=== 1983–1986 ===
In 1983, Martin began driving for Jim Stacy. The two parted ways after just seven races, posting three top-11 finishes while having four races in which they finished 24th or worse. Following a two-race stint driving for D. K. Ulrich and one for Emanuel Zervakis, he landed a ride with Morgan-McClure Motorsports for six races, becoming the organization's first driver. While with Morgan-McClure, Martin recorded four top-20 finishes, including a 10th-place run at Talladega.

Unable to secure a ride for 1984, Martin returned to the American Speed Association. Jimmy Fennig joined as crew chief in 1985, and the two went on to win the ASA championship the following season, which became Martin's fourth series title. His success during his three-year stint in ASA earned him a part-time ride with Jerry Gunderman. In five starts, he posted two top-15 finishes and started on the outside pole at Atlanta.

=== 1987 ===
Martin's success over the previous three seasons earned him a full-time ride with Bruce Lawmaster in the Busch Series. The season began strongly, as he posted two wins, three poles, nine top-tens, and held fourth place in the standings after fifteen races. After recording just one DNF in those first fifteen events, Martin suffered seven DNFs in the final twelve races, including six caused by mechanical failures and four by blown engines. Despite finishing in the top-ten in the other five races, the team's inability to finish races late in the season dropped Martin from fourth to eighth place in the final standings.

Although the late-season collapse ended Martin's chance at the championship, his performance in 1987 attracted the attention of Jack Roush, who selected him to drive in the Winston Cup Series for 1988. Martin ended the 1987 season with three wins, six poles, thirteen top-tens, and an eighth-place finish in the points standings.

=== Roush Racing ===
==== 1988–1991 ====
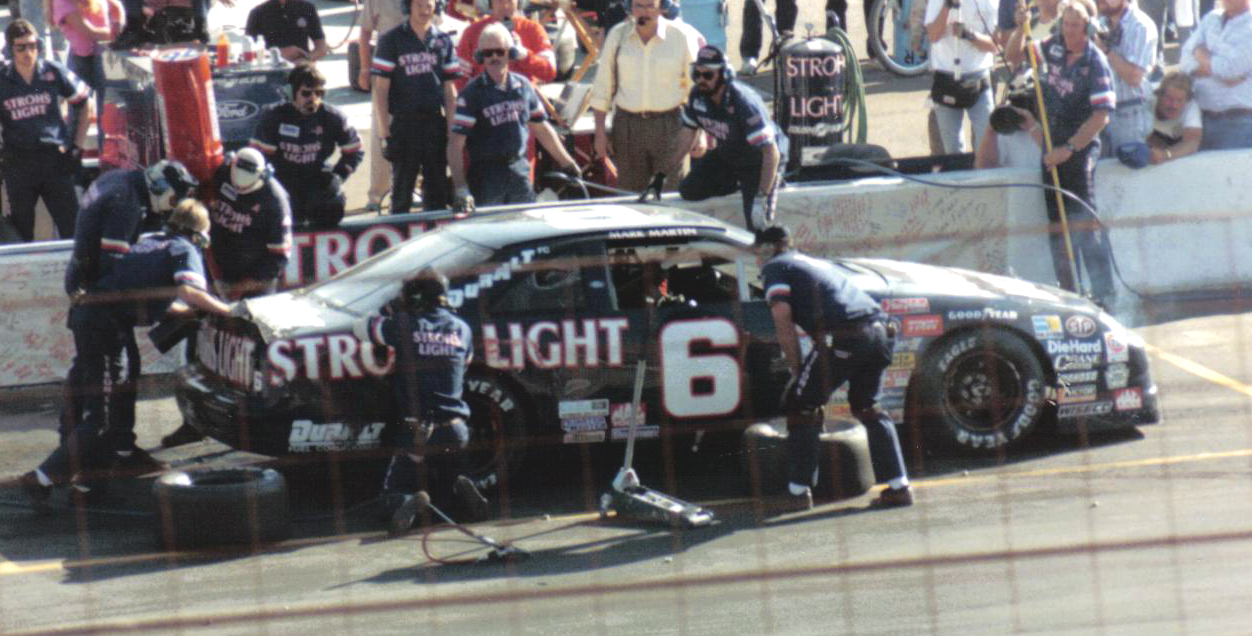
1989 Winston Cup car on pit road at Phoenix

Martin came aboard the newly formed Roush Racing, with crew chief Steve Hmiel, for the first of nineteen seasons in 1988, driving the No. 6 Ford Thunderbird. Martin showed both signs of struggle and potential in his inaugural NASCAR Winston Cup Series season, recording three top-five finishes and ten top-ten finishes, along with winning the pole at Dover. He finished a season-high second at Bristol early in the year. Consistency proved crucial, as ten DNF's prevented Martin from cracking the top-ten in points at any point during the season. He finished his comeback year 15th in the standings. Martin also competed in the Busch Series on a limited basis for Bill Davis Racing from 1988 to 1991.

Martin's 1989 season began much like his 1988 campaign, with a DNF in the Daytona 500. After the first four races, he was 18th in the standings but went on to continue the year with four poles and a stretch of finishing sixth or better in the next seven starts. He spent much of the season fluctuating between second and fifth in the standings. With three races remaining, he won his first Winston Cup race at Rockingham, beating eventual series champion Rusty Wallace by three seconds. It was the first win for Roush as an owner. An engine failure in the season finale at Atlanta relegated him to a third-place finish in the standings. Martin led the series with a 5.3 average starting position, posting six poles and twenty-six top-ten starting positions in twenty-nine races. He also posted fourteen top-five finishes, eighteen top-ten finishes, and reduced his DNF total from ten to four.

Martin entered the 1990 season as a favorite to win the Winston Cup championship. He started the year with a 21st-place finish in the Daytona 500, his first completed run in the big race in six attempts. His team was met with controversy following his second career win at Richmond. During post-race inspection, it was determined that he had raced with an illegal carburetor spacer. Had the spacer been welded instead of bolted on, it would not have been considered illegal. The consensus among Martin's fellow competitors was that the part did not provide a performance advantage, but it also was not strictly within the "letter of the law" with regard to the NASCAR rulebook. As a result, Martin was penalized 46 championship points, and crew chief Robin Pemberton was fined $40,000.

Following a DNF the next race, Martin finished no worse than 14th over the final twenty-six races. He gained the championship points lead one-third into the season and held onto it for sixteen races before dropping it to Dale Earnhardt with two races remaining. Despite having three wins, sixteen top-fives, twenty-three top-tens, and three poles, Martin lost to Earnhardt by twenty-six points in the final standings. Had the 46-point penalty never occurred, he theoretically would have won the championship over Earnhardt by twenty points.

Martin's 1991 season was disappointing compared to the previous year, as he entered with expectations of winning the series championship. Although he ran well, he never achieved the points lead throughout the season and was winless entering the season finale at Atlanta, a race that he ultimately won. He also came close to winning at Charlotte three races prior, leading 198 of the first 212 laps before engine failure ended his race. Along with his win at Atlanta, Martin finished the year with fourteen top-fives, seventeen top-tens, five poles, and a 6th-place finish in the standings.

==== 1992–2004 ====
Mark entered the 1992 season's final race, the 1992 Hooters 500 in Atlanta, as one of six drivers in contention for the championship, but an engine failure on lap 160 ended his championship hopes. He finished the season with wins at Martinsville and Charlotte, along with ten top-five finishes, seventeen top-ten finishes, one pole, and a second consecutive sixth-place finish in the standings.

Martin began the 1993 season with a 6th-place finish in the 1993 Daytona 500, his first Top 20 finish in the event. In the second half of the season, he became the sixth driver in NASCAR's modern era to win four consecutive races, winning at Watkins Glen, Michigan, Bristol, and Darlington. Along with a win at Phoenix, Martin finished with five wins, twelve top-five finishes, nineteen top-ten finishes, and five poles en route to a 3rd-place finish in the standings, 376 points behind Dale Earnhardt and 296 points behind points runner-up Rusty Wallace. It was his first top-five finish in the standings since his near-championship win three years earlier.

Despite having eight DNF's, Martin finished 2nd to Dale Earnhardt in the 1994 standings, 444 points behind. He posted two wins, including winning from the pole at Watkins Glen for the second consecutive year, and the season finale in Atlanta. Martin also scored fifteen Top 5's and twenty top-tens during the season, his most since 1990. Other than the season opener at Daytona, Martin was never outside the top-five in the standings. Among the highlights of Martin's 1994 season was a spectacular and frightening crash at the 1994 Winston Select 500: on Lap 103, Todd Bodine, Greg Sacks, and Jeff Gordon got together in the tri-oval, collecting an additional eight cars, including Martin. Martin's car lost its brakes, ran through the infield grass, smashed the inside wall, and plowed through a guardrail, a chain-link fence, and another guardrail protecting the infield road course, coming to rest only feet from a spectator area.

In 1994, Martin raced in the Busch Series. That year he became known for a mistake he made at Bristol. Martin led the field to a white and caution flag to win. When coming back by, Martin went down pit road thinking it was over, but he did not take the checkered flag. David Green took the win, and in victory circle Green said "I feel bad for him. A tough way for me to win, but I will take it." Martin finished eleventh; afterwards he stated "I can't believe anybody else would be that stupid," and that the mistake was "the stupidest thing I've ever done".

Martin won four races in 1995, including his third consecutive win from the pole at Watkins Glen and a victory at Talladega, his first restrictor-plate win. He also finished with thirteen top-fives and twenty-two top-tens. Though he had only one DNF, he had five finishes of 28th or worse, which earned him fourth place in the standings. Martin was one of three drivers, the others being Dale Earnhardt and Sterling Marlin, to be ranked in the top-five for all thirty-one races; none of them won the championship. For the Busch Series in 1995, Martin won three races, including the controversial Detroit Gasket 200, where Dale Jarrett won before being disqualified, handing victory to Martin.

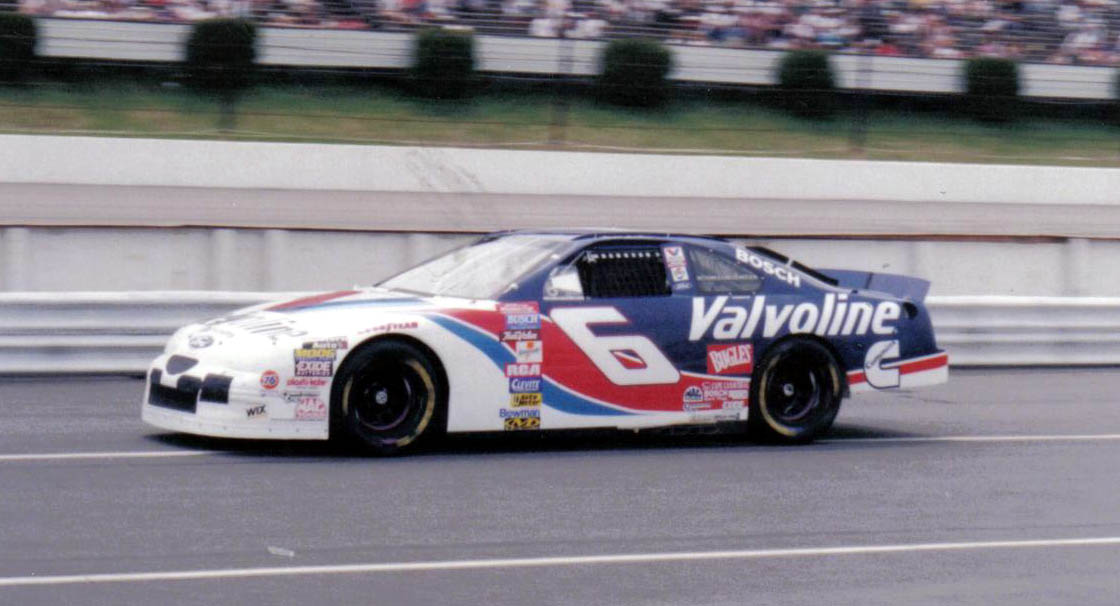
Martin's paint scheme for 1996–1997.

In 1996, Martin was winless for the first time in eight seasons. Other than his lack of wins, his season was very similar to 1995, with fourteen top-five finishes, twenty-three top-ten finishes, and four poles. He finished a season-high second four times, including at Michigan when he was passed by winner Dale Jarrett with eight laps to go. He finished the season fifth in the standings and had fifteen consecutive top-ten finishes to close out the season.

In 1997, Martin rebounded, scoring four wins at Sonoma, Talladega, Michigan, and Dover. He finished third in the final standings, 29 points behind champion Jeff Gordon and fifteen points behind runner-up Dale Jarrett.

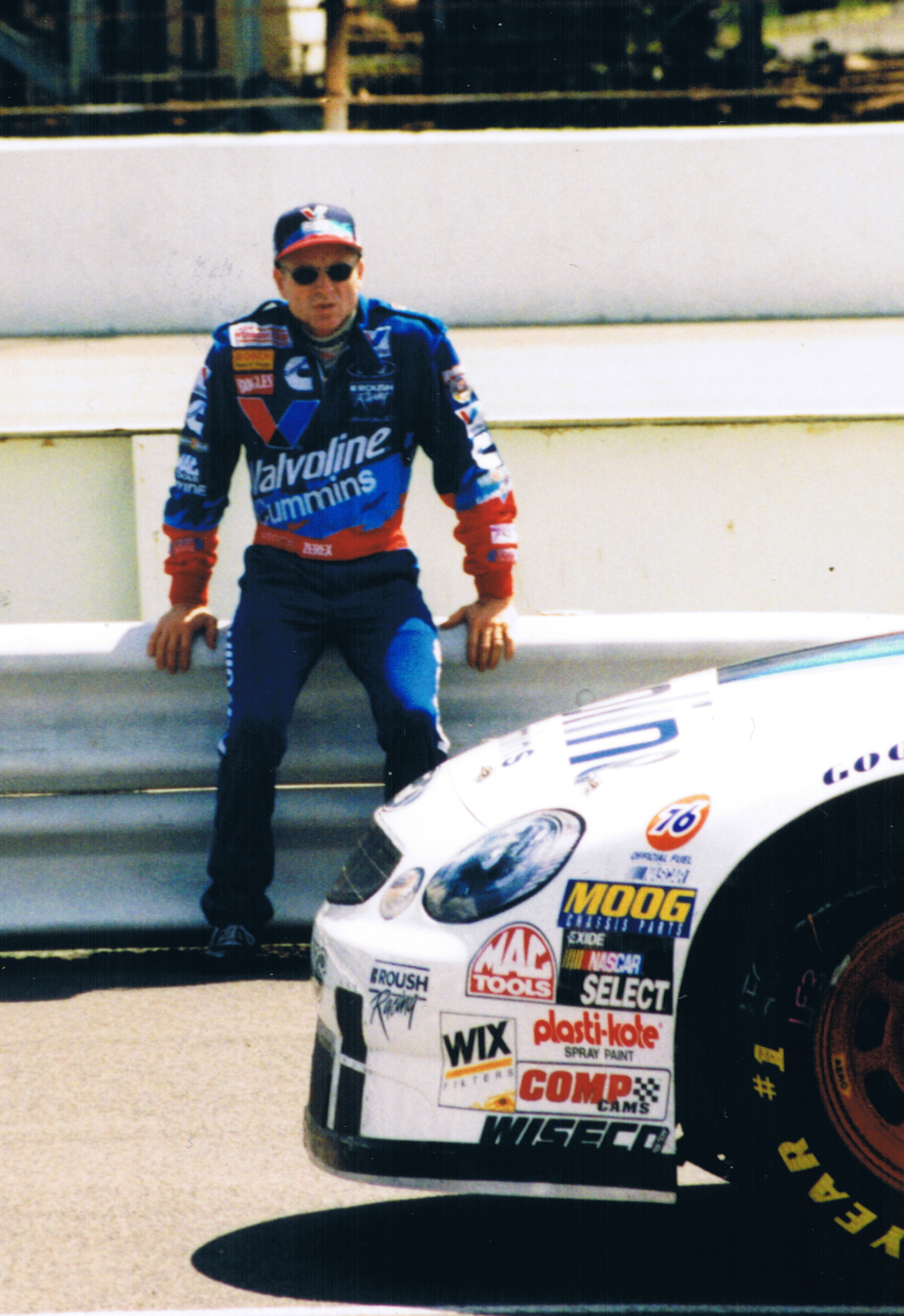
Martin prior to qualifying at Pocono 1998

In 1998, Martin had his best season, scoring seven wins, twenty-two top-fives, twenty-six top-tens, and three poles with an average finish of 8.64. But once again, Martin finished as a runner-up in the standings to Jeff Gordon by 364 points.

Although he scored only two wins in 1999, Martin scored twenty-six top-ten's for the second consecutive season and finished third in points.

In 2000, Martin won just once at the 2000 Goody's Body Pain 500 and finished eighth in points, his first finish outside the top-five since 1992.

Martin's struggles continued in 2001, as he went winless for the first time since 1996 and finished 12th in points.

In 2002, Martin received a new crew chief in Ben Leslie as Fennig moved to second-year driver Kurt Busch. The move would pay off for both sides, as Martin would win one race that season at the Coca-Cola 600 and was a championship contender all season. He even led the standings at one point, but a late-season penalty at Rockingham arguably cost him the championship, as he came home second again, this time to Tony Stewart.

Martin struggled again in 2003, going winless and finishing 17th in points. Ben Leslie was reassigned to the No. 21 Wood Brothers Racing car with two races remaining in 2003. Subsequently, Pat Tryson was brought on as the new crew chief for the No. 6 team. With Tryson, Martin returned to victory lane in the 2004 MBNA America 400 and finished 4th in points.

==== 2005–2006 ====
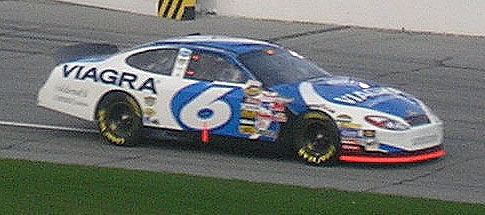
Martin's No. 6 Viagra Ford Taurus

Overall, with Roush Racing, Martin won thirty-five career NASCAR Cup Series races and finished 2nd in the Cup Series point standings four times (1990, 1994, 1998, and 2002). While racing for Roush in 1990, Martin came closest to winning a championship. A 46-point penalty at Richmond, for using an illegal (but non-performance-enhancing) carburetor spacer, caused him to lose to Dale Earnhardt by 26 points in the final standings. During this time, Martin also won five IROC titles (1994, 1996, 1997, 1998, and 2005) and thirteen races, both records for that series.

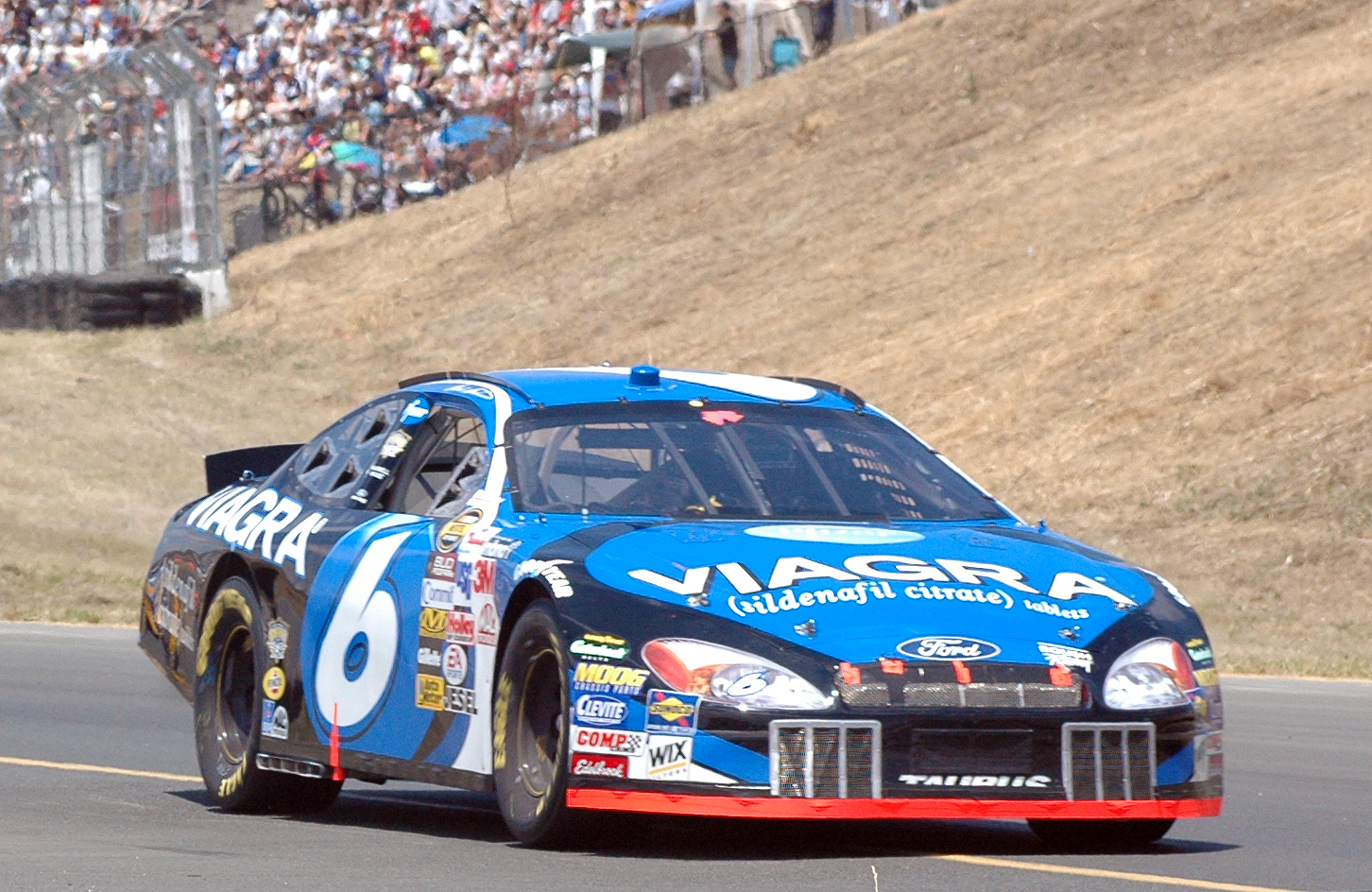
Martin at Infineon Raceway in 2005

Martin announced he would cut back from "full-time" Cup Series racing after the 2005 season, dubbing the season the "Salute to You" tour as a thank-you to his fans. Martin won the Nextel Challenge in a "Retro 93" paint scheme, picked up his final win with Roush at Kansas, and again made the Chase for the Cup with a fourth place finish in the standings at the end of the year. In a tribute to Martin's career at Roush, the team ran four throwback retro schemes in 2005 that celebrated paint schemes from 1981, 1988–89, 1990–91, and 1993.

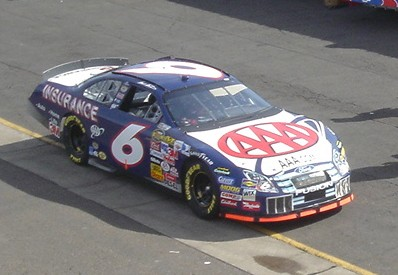
Martin in his final season for Roush in 2006.

In June 2005, it was announced that Jamie McMurray would replace Martin in the No. 6 car in 2006. However, after the departure of Kurt Busch in 2005, resulting in McMurray moving to Busch's team instead, Roush was left without a driver for the No. 6 car for 2006. Martin later agreed to come back and drive for the 2006 season. Ultimately, it was announced that McMurray would be released from his contract at Chip Ganassi Racing one year early and would take over for Busch, who was dismissed from the Roush organization before the end of the 2005 season. David Ragan was announced as Martin's replacement in the No. 6 for 2007.

In 2006, Martin competed in fourteen of 25 races in the Truck Series. He won six times, including the opener at Daytona, and recorded twelve Top 10 finishes.

=== Ginn Racing & Dale Earnhardt, Inc. ===
==== 2007 ====
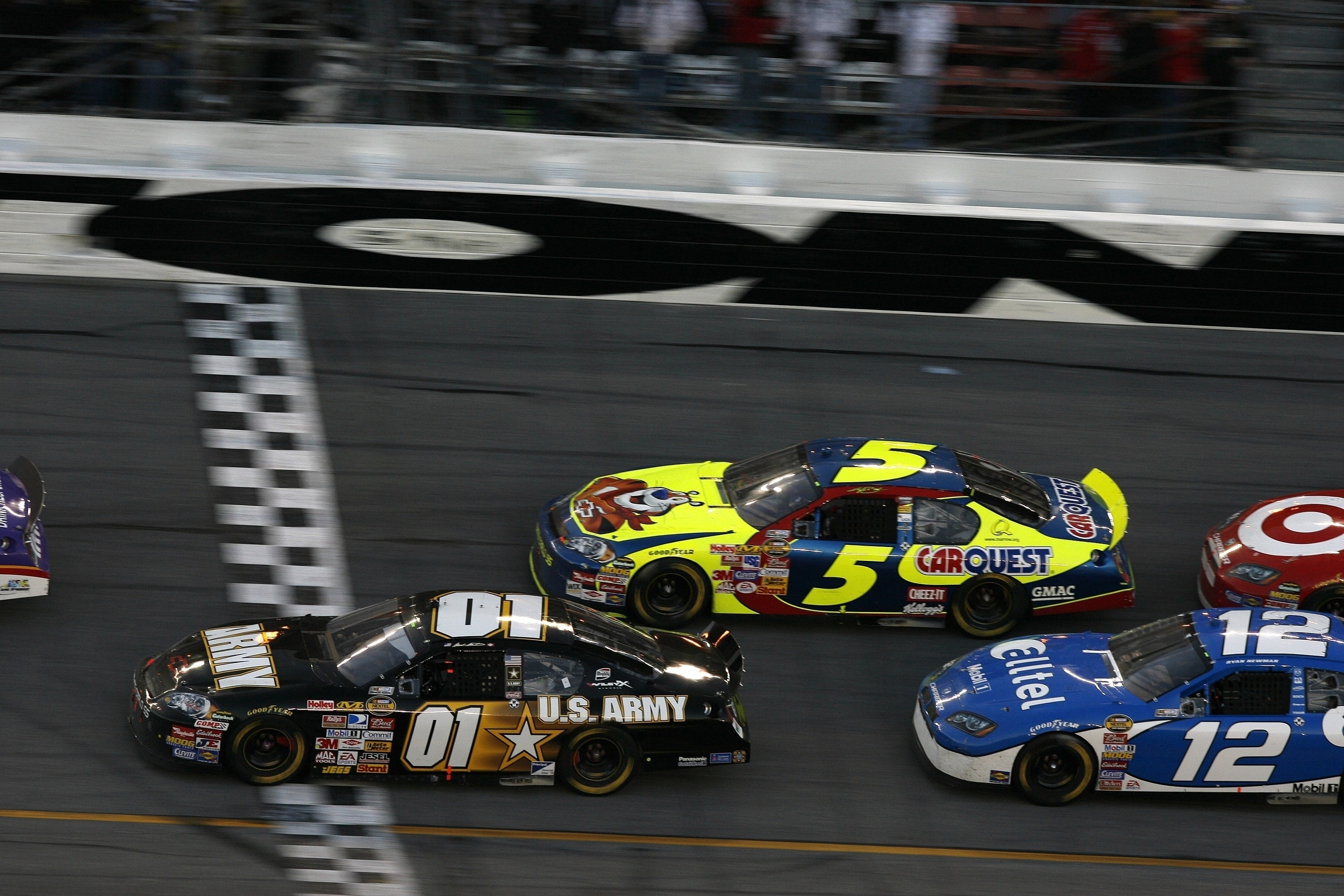
Martin (No. 01) in the 2007 Daytona 500

On October 6, 2006, it was announced that Martin would split time with Regan Smith in the Ginn Racing No. 01 Chevrolet in 2007. Roush Racing announced that due to team limits imposed by NASCAR, they could not field a team for Martin for all twenty races he wanted to race in 2007, forcing him to move on, at least in the Nextel Cup Series. However, Martin drove two races for Roush Fenway Racing in the Busch Series and also drove in three races for Hendrick Motorsports, sharing the No. 5 with Kyle Busch.

Martin finished second in the 2007 Daytona 500, only 0.020 seconds behind Kevin Harvick in one of the most controversial finishes in the race's history. Martin led going into the final lap before Harvick stormed from seventh to win on the outside. There has been much controversy over whether or not the caution flag should have come out as a result of a large multi-car crash behind them, which could have affected the outcome of the race. Normally, the caution flag is shown as soon as one or more cars make contact with the wall. Despite the controversy, Martin was gracious in defeat, saying, "I didn't get the job done."

2007 was Martin's first season to start with three consecutive Top 5 finishes. Martin is the only part-time driver in NASCAR history to not win the opening race but still be leading the points standings. It was also the first time he had three consecutive Top 5 finishes since 2002. Martin is also the oldest driver in the modern era to lead the Nextel Cup points for more than one week. Martin led the Nextel Cup points from the second race of the season, the Auto Club 500, through the fourth race of the season, the Kobalt Tools 500. Martin did not compete in the Food City 500, becoming the first driver since Cale Yarborough to sit out a race as the points leader.

On July 25, 2007, Dale Earnhardt, Inc. announced it had acquired Ginn Racing, and Martin joined Dale Earnhardt Jr., Martin Truex Jr., and Paul Menard as a driver for DEI starting at the 2007 Brickyard 400. He shared the No. 01 car with Aric Almirola for the rest of the season.

==== 2008 ====
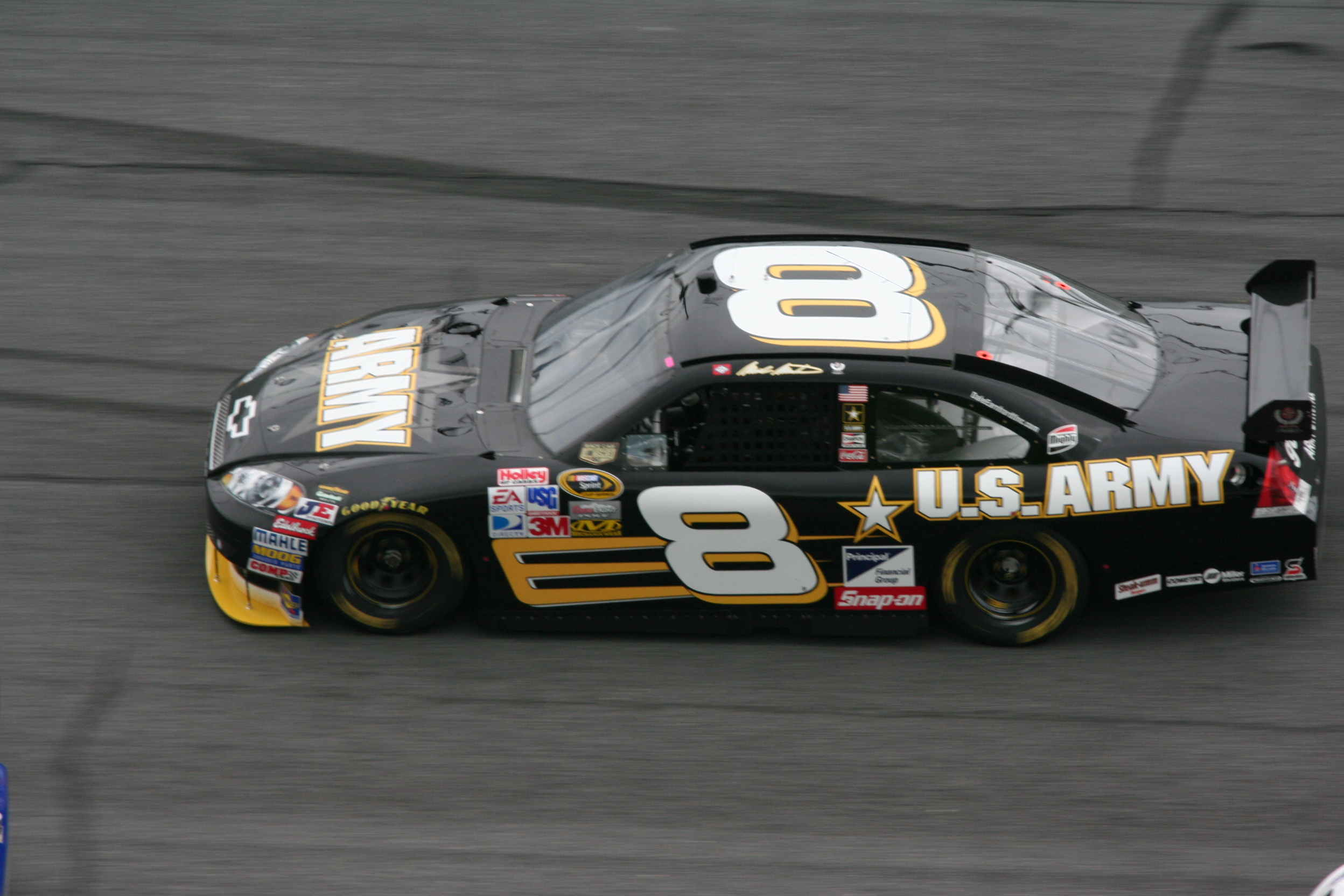
2008 Sprint Cup car

On September 8, 2007, it was announced that Martin would share the No. 8 car with Aric Almirola in the 2008 Sprint Cup Series.

Martin made his seven-hundredth career start at the 2008 Auto Club 500. On March 1, 2008, Martin won the 2008 Sam's Town 300 driving the No. 5 Delphi Chevrolet for JR Motorsports. It was Martin's 48th career Nationwide Series victory and JR Motorsports' first win. Martin finished out 2008 with eleven top-tens in twenty-one starts.

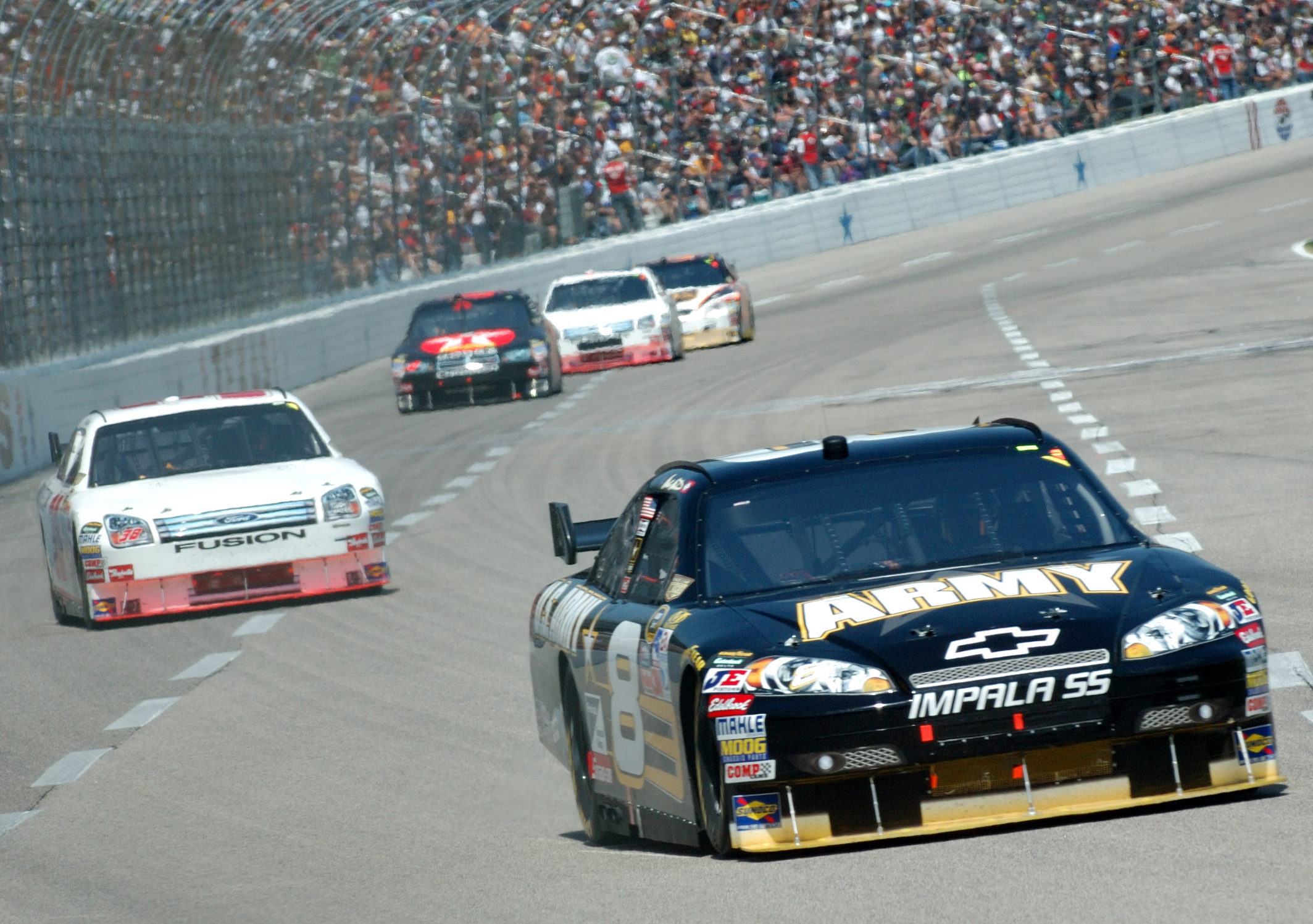
Martin at Texas 2008

During the weekend of the 2008 Toyota/Save Mart 350, ESPN reported that Martin was leaving Dale Earnhardt, Inc. following the 2008 season. It was announced that Aric Almirola, who had shared the No. 8 car with Martin, would drive the car full-time in 2009.

=== Hendrick Motorsports ===
==== 2009: Runner-up points finish ====
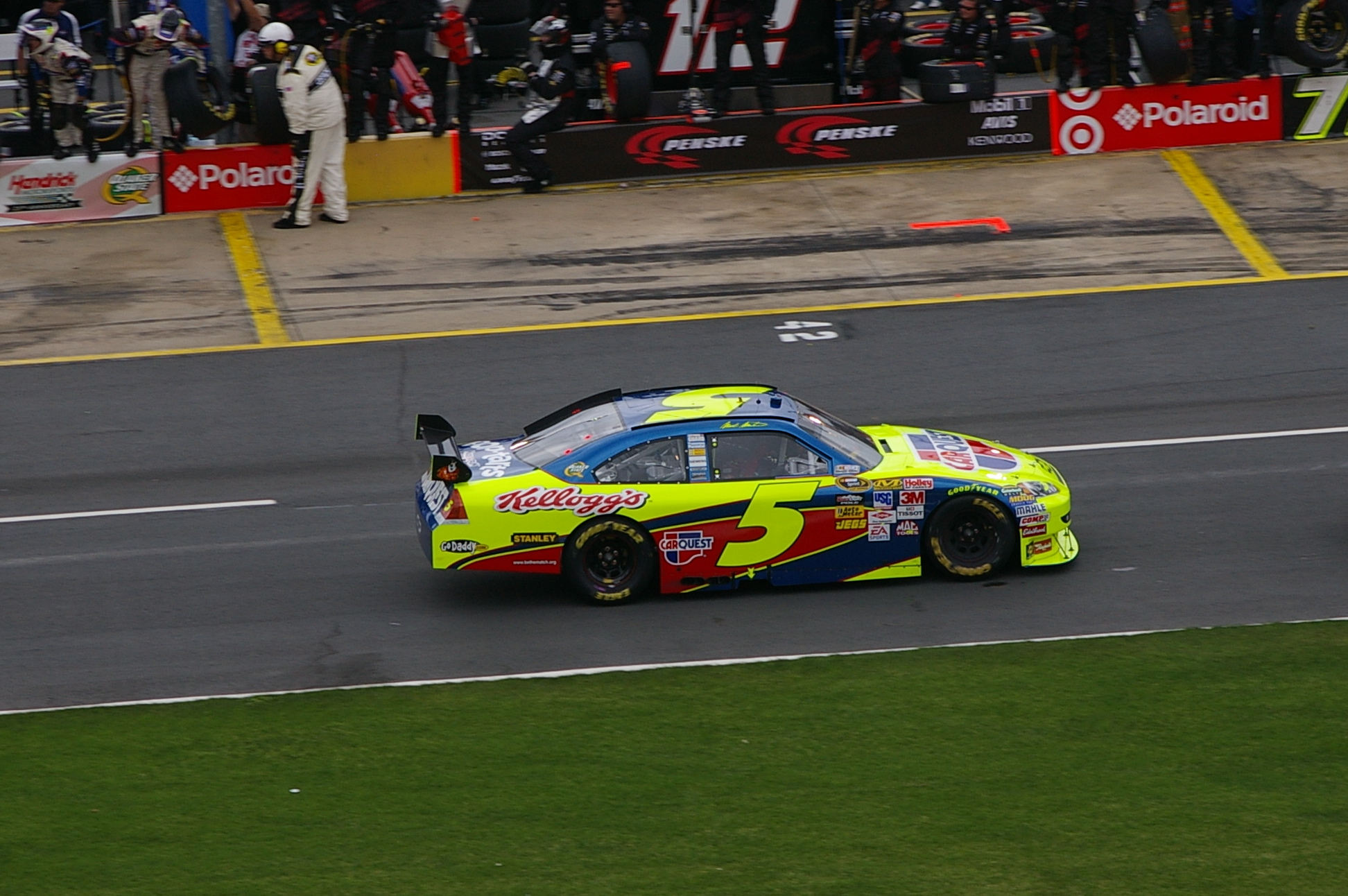
2009 Sprint Cup car at Charlotte

On July 4, 2008, Hendrick Motorsports owner Rick Hendrick and Martin announced that he would replace Casey Mears in the No. 5 car for the 2009 season, running a full-time schedule for the first time since 2006. Martin signed a two-year contract with Hendrick, with a full-time schedule for 2009 and 2010. Martin grabbed his first pole since 2001 at the Kobalt Tools 500 at Atlanta, and followed up with back-to-back poles the following week at Bristol.

On April 18, 2009, Martin became the fourth ever driver to win a Cup race in NASCAR after turning 50, winning the 2009 Subway Fresh Fit 500 at Phoenix from the pole position. The other three were Bobby Allison, Morgan Shepherd (twice), and Harry Gant (8 times, last in 1992). His win snapped a 97-race winless streak dating back to 2005. After the victory, he did a Polish Victory Lap as a tribute to his late friend Alan Kulwicki, at the place where Kulwicki did his first Polish Victory Lap. At Darlington, it was announced after the Richmond race that Martin would drive full-time again in 2010. Martin would go on to win the 2009 Southern 500. It was his first multiple-win season since 1999. In the 2009 LifeLock 400, Martin won his third race of the season when Jimmie Johnson and Greg Biffle ran out of fuel in the last two laps while Martin had strategically conserved fuel and stayed back in third, waiting for the leaders to run out. Martin added a series-leading fourth win at the LifeLock.com 400 at Chicagoland in July, holding off a charging Jeff Gordon. Because he and teammate Gordon also finished 1–2 at the LifeLock 400 at Michigan in June, LifeLock will pay a $1 million bonus to a family in Colorado. Despite his series-leading four wins, due to some early season troubles, including two engine failures, a blown tire, and getting caught up in multi-car wrecks at Talladega and Daytona, Martin had struggled to get into the top-12, moving up two spots to 11th place with the win at Chicagoland. Martin also got his fifth pole of the 2009 season at Bristol Motor Speedway for the Sharpie 500.

After being on the Chase bubble for most of the season, Martin qualified for the 2009 Chase for the Sprint Cup, as he was in sixth place in the standings following the 2009 Chevy Rock & Roll 400. Because he led the Chase drivers in wins, with four, the Chase reseeding process moved him up five places and made him the points leader.

On September 20, he won his 40th and final career victory in Cup competition by taking the 2009 Sylvania 300 at New Hampshire Motor Speedway in the first race of the Chase. The win broke Martin's tie with Kyle Busch for the series wins lead and marked the third and final time in his career that he had won at least five times in a season (1993 and 1998). Martin extended his lead to 35 points over Jimmie Johnson and Denny Hamlin, who were tied for second in the standings.

At the end of the 2009 AMP Energy 500 at Talladega, Martin was involved in a frightening crash in the last laps when he turned after contact with Martin Truex Jr. and Juan Pablo Montoya, and flipped over one and a half times. It was the second time Martin had ever been upside down in his racing career. Once righted, Martin managed to drive his car back to pit road. The wreck essentially ended his championship hopes according to experts.

Entering the season finale at Homestead–Miami Speedway, Martin and Johnson were the only drivers still able to win the 2009 NASCAR Sprint Cup Series Championship. Martin finished twelfth in the race, which was not enough to overcome Johnson's lead. Martin again finished second in the standings, for the fifth and final time in his career.

==== 2010 ====
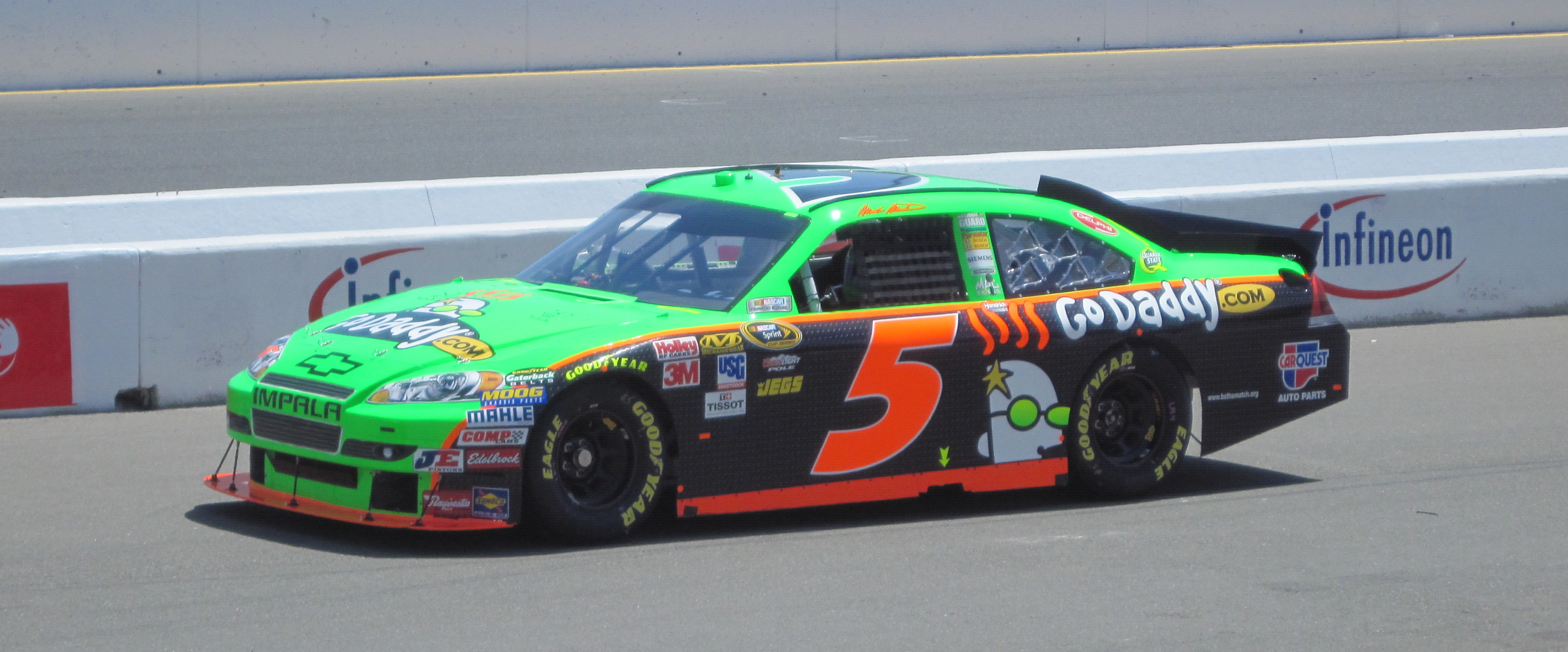
2010 Sprint Cup car at Infineon Raceway

In 2010, Martin started the year strong and won the pole for the 2010 Daytona 500.

Martin ran well in the Sprint Unlimited, but was caught up in the "big one" during a green–white–checkered finish and finished 21st. Martin started the Daytona 500 well, leading the majority of the first thirty laps, but after being stuck in the middle line of the racing pack, he dropped down as low as 33rd and had to pick his way through the rest of the day, eventually finishing 12th.

Martin ran well at the 2010 Auto Club 500 and 2010 Shelby American, scoring back-to-back fourth-place finishes and advancing as high as 3rd in the points standings, only 49 points out of the lead. However, he was less successful in his next three races. He got caught up in wrecks at both the 2010 Kobalt Tools 500 and 2010 Food City 500, finishing 33rd and 35th, respectively. At the 2010 Goody's Fast Pain Relief 500, Martin was leading the field and running top-five during most of the day until a flat tire relegated him to 21st. During this stretch of bad luck, Martin fell from third to 17th in the points standings, 214 points behind the leader.

The next three races of the 2010 season saw Martin rally back. With a fourth-place finish at the 2010 Subway Fresh Fit 600, a 6th-place finish at Texas, and a fifth-place finish at the 2010 Aaron's 499, Martin jumped from 17th in the points standings to sixth, 169 points behind the leader.

Martin's bad luck struck again in the following three races as he struggled to get a handle on his race cars. A 25th-place finish at the 2010 Crown Royal Presents the Heath Calhoun 400, 16th-place finish at the 2010 Showtime Southern 500, and 15th-place finish at the 2010 Autism Speaks 400 caused Martin to fall to 11th in the points standings, 293 points behind the leader.

In the 2010 NASCAR Sprint All-Star Race, qualifying was rained out. The field was set in the order the drivers drew. Martin started 15th and finished the first fifty-lap segment in 15th. He used a two-tire pit stop to gain a position and finished the second twenty-lap segment in third. He held his position in the third twenty-lap segment and finished 3rd. Martin lost a spot during the mandatory four-tire pit stop before the start of the final ten-lap shootout for the $1 million. However, as the field took the green, Martin was hit by another car and crashed, finishing 17th.

A week later, Martin returned to Charlotte Motor Speedway for the 2010 Coca-Cola 600. Martin qualified 11th and struggled with handling issues for much of the race. However, during a caution with twenty laps to go, most of the field pitted, and Martin chose to stay out. He restarted second and finished the race in fourth.

Martin had a season best finish of second at the 2010 TUMS Fast Relief 500. Martin crashed with 275 laps to go, but managed to work his way up fifteen spots with bent fenders and no rear end.

==== 2011 ====
In 2011, Martin began the season with an accident in the 2011 Budweiser Shootout. During the 2011 Daytona 500, he was involved in a multiple-car accident. In the 2011 Subway Fresh Fit 500, he managed to finish 13th. One week later, Martin participated in the Nationwide Series Sam's Town 300 at Las Vegas Motor Speedway, where he was able to win his 49th race in the series. He finished the Sprint Cup season 22nd in points. Martin parted ways with Hendrick Motorsports at the end of the 2011 season, with Kasey Kahne taking over the No. 5 Chevrolet.

=== Michael Waltrip Racing and part-time days ===
==== 2012 ====
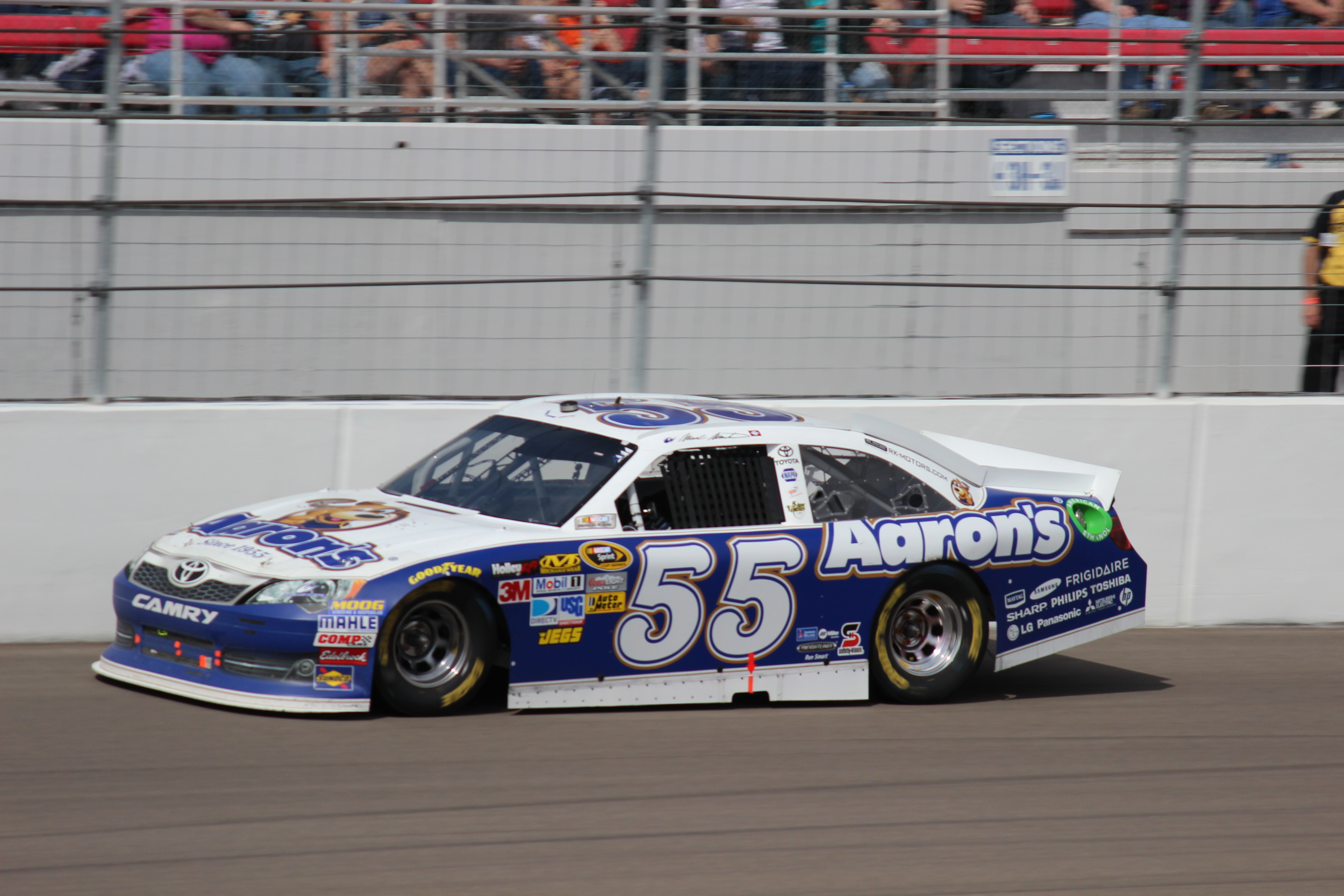
Martin's No. 55 car at Las Vegas Motor Speedway in 2012

On November 4, 2011, Michael Waltrip Racing announced that Martin would replace David Reutimann in 2012, signing him to a two-year deal to drive the No. 55. He was signed to drive 25 races in both 2012 and 2013, sharing the car with Michael Waltrip and Brian Vickers. Martin finished the year with four top-five finishes and ten top-ten finishes. He led the most laps after winning the pole at the 2012 Pure Michigan 400, but was involved in a bizarre accident around lap 64. Martin was about to lap Bobby Labonte and Juan Pablo Montoya when Labonte's car got loose, collecting Martin and Kasey Kahne. Martin's car skidded down pit road, allowing the opening of the concrete pit wall to penetrate just behind the driver's compartment, breaching the car's oil tank and sending Kahne's pit crew scrambling for cover.

==== 2013 ====
Martin's 2013 season started with a 3rd-place finish in the 2013 Daytona 500. He backed up his strong Daytona finish by winning the pole for the 2013 Subway Fresh Fit 500, becoming the second-oldest driver to win a pole in the NASCAR Sprint Cup Series. He finished 21st at Phoenix, followed by a 14th-place finish at the 2013 Kobalt Tools 400. Martin skipped the 2013 Food City 500, where Brian Vickers drove the car. When Martin returned at the 2013 Auto Club 400, he finished 37th after spinning on the back straightaway late in the race, collecting David Gilliland.

A few days after the Auto Club 400, Joe Gibbs hired Martin to drive Denny Hamlin's No. 11 FedEx Toyota at the 2013 STP Gas Booster 500 after Hamlin suffered a compression fracture of a vertebra in his lower back after being involved in a crash with Joey Logano on the last lap of the Fontana race. In his one appearance in the No. 11, Martin was involved in a melee on lap 180, sustaining damage, and later had a mishap on a pit stop that caused him to be penalized a lap, but he managed to finish tenth.

Martin returned to the No. 55 at the 2013 NRA 500. Following two top-15 finishes in his original car in the next two races, Martin qualified tenth at the 2013 Toyota Owners 400, but finished 38th after an accident on lap 348. At the 2013 Coca-Cola 600, on lap 324, Martin was involved in a crash with Jeff Gordon and Aric Almirola, which brought out the red flag.

In early August, it was announced that Brian Vickers would drive the No. 55 full-time starting in 2014. Thus, Martin's future status with MWR was left uncertain.

At the 2013 Pure Michigan 400 at Michigan International Speedway, Martin nearly won before running out of fuel with three laps remaining. Afterward, it was announced that Martin would be given an early release from MWR, and would be joining Stewart–Haas Racing to drive the No. 14 Chevrolet, beginning with the 2013 Irwin Tools Night Race at Bristol Motor Speedway. Martin drove in all but one race for the remainder of the season as a substitute driver for the injured Tony Stewart.

== Post-racing career ==
On November 8, 2013, Martin announced that he would not race in 2014 but was not yet ready to use the word "retirement." Martin worked with SHR in a consulting role, which included testing, but Martin never got in the car due to Tony Stewart recovering before the 2014 season.

On July 31, 2014, Martin tweeted that he had become a driver development coach with Roush Fenway Racing.

On February 6, 2015, Martin tweeted that he was no longer a driver coach at Roush, in response to a fan's question. Martin has now retired from racing himself but does work with a dirt racing team in the Lucas Oil Late Model Dirt Series, where his Mark Martin Automotive Group co-sponsors driver Jared Landers.

Martin owns a group of automobile dealerships in Arkansas under the umbrella of Mark Martin Automotive, headquartered in Batesville, Arkansas. The dealerships sell Ford, Kia, Chevrolet, GMC, and Buick vehicles. He also owns Mark Martin Powersports in Batesville, Arkansas, which sells boats, motorcycles, ATVs, and UTVs manufactured by companies such as AlumaCraft, Mercury Outboards, Tohatsu, Excel, Honda, Kawasaki, and Yamaha.

== Awards and honors ==
- 1989 Richard Petty Driver of the Year
- Named one of NASCAR's 50 Greatest Drivers in 1998
- 2002, 2005, 2009 NASCAR Illustrated Person of the Year Award recipient
- 2008 Legends of The Glen inductee
- 2015 Motorsports Hall of Fame of America inductee
- 2017 NASCAR Hall of Fame inductee
- 2017 National Motorsports Press Association Hall of Fame inductee
- Named one of NASCAR's 75 Greatest Drivers in 2023
- 2025 Wisconsin International Raceway's Circle of Fame

== Personal life ==
Martin resided in Jamestown, North Carolina, followed by a move to Daytona Beach, Florida. He has five children, (four of whom are from his wife's first marriage). His son Matt raced for a time in lower series, but quit after 2008. Martin's father, stepmother and half-sister died in a plane crash on August 8, 1998, in Nevada near Great Basin National Park. Martin won at Bristol two weeks after the incident and fought back tears as he dedicated the win to his family. Martin currently owns five car dealerships in Arkansas, representing the Hyundai Motor Group (Kia in Batesville), General Motors (Chevrolet in Melbourne and a Chevrolet, Buick, and GMC dealership in Ash Flat), Ford Motor Company (Batesville), and Fiat Automobili S.p.A. (Melbourne).

Martin was regarded as one of the first drivers in the United States to adopt a personal fitness and nutrition regimen, which he credited for allowing him to race at a high level into his 50s. He was well known around the NASCAR paddock for sometimes lifting thousands of pounds every day except race days. During the 1990s, he co-authored a book entitled Strength Training for Performance Driving, outlining workouts useful for adapting to the rigors of auto racing.

Martin and his wife Arlene currently reside in his hometown of Batesville, Arkansas, and he frequently visits the local state park of Petit Jean Mountain in Morrilton.

Martin spends most of his time now on the road touring the country in his RV. He is a fan of rap music, citing rapper Gucci Mane as his favorite. Martin recounts that what had gotten him into rap music was a test at Charlotte Motor Speedway where crew chief Ben Leslie was playing Dr. Dre in the transporter. In 2024, Gucci Mane sampled an interview of Martin for his song "GOAT". He also still avidly follows NASCAR, and pavement Late Model racing.

Martin campaigned for Donald Trump in the 2016 Republican primaries, appearing at a rally in Concord, North Carolina and continued to endorse him through the general election.

== Motorsports career results ==
=== NASCAR ===
(key) (Bold – Pole position awarded by qualifying time. Italics – Pole position earned by points standings or practice time. * – Most laps led.)

==== Sprint Cup Series ====
NASCAR Sprint Cup Series results
Year	Team	No.	Make	1	2	3	4	5	6	7	8	9	10	11	12	13	14	15	16	17	18	19	20	21	22	23	24	25	26	27	28	29	30	31	32	33	34	35	36	Rank	Pts	Ref
1981	Martin-Reeder Racing	02	Pontiac	RSD	DAY	RCH	CAR	ATL	BRI	NWS; 27	DAR	MAR	TAL	NSV; 27	DOV	CLT	TWS	RSD	MCH	DAY	**NSV**; 11	POC	TAL	MCH	BRI	DAR	**RCH**; 7	DOV	MAR; 3	NWS	CLT	CAR	ATL	RSD						42nd	615	
1982	Martin-Reeder Racing	02	Buick	DAY; 30			ATL; 19		DAR; 7			TAL; 10	NSV; 12	DOV; 5		POC; 26	RSD; 8								DAR; 22	RCH; 26		NWS; 12	CLT; 38	MAR; 20	CAR; 24	ATL; 10	RSD; 5							14th	3042	
1982	Martin-Reeder Racing	02	Pontiac		RCH; 26	BRI; 14				NWS; 25	MAR; 7				CLT; 27			MCH; 33	DAY; 31	NSV; 15	POC; 10	TAL; 12	MCH; 34	BRI; 11			DOV; 33													14th	3042	
1982	Rogers Racing	37	Buick					CAR; 32																																14th	3042	
1983	Jim Stacy Racing	2	Buick	DAY; 28	RCH; 24	CAR; 11	ATL; 7	DAR; 3	NWS; 26	MAR; 27																														30th	1627	
1983	Ulrich Racing	6	Chevy								TAL; 36																													30th	1627	
1983	Ulrich Racing	6	Buick									NSV; 21	DOV	BRI																										30th	1627	
1983	Zervakis Racing	01	Chevy												CLT; 29	RSD	POC																							30th	1627	
1983	Morgan-McClure Motorsports	4	Olds															MCH; 27	DAY; 19	NSV	POC		MCH; 18	BRI	DAR; 17	RCH	DOV	MAR	NWS											30th	1627	
1983	Morgan-McClure Motorsports	4	Chevy																			TAL; 10								CLT; 33	CAR	ATL; DNQ	RSD							30th	1627	
1986	Gunderman Racing	02	Ford	DAY; 37	RCH	CAR	ATL	BRI	DAR	NWS	MAR	TAL; DNQ	DOV	CLT; 22	RSD	POC	MCH	DAY	POC	TAL	GLN	MCH	BRI	DAR	RCH	DOV; 11	MAR	NWS	CLT	CAR	ATL; 26	RSD; 13								47th	364	
1987	Hamby Racing	12	Olds	DAY	CAR	RCH	ATL	DAR	NWS	BRI	MAR	TAL	CLT; 39	DOV	POC	RIV	MCH	DAY	POC	TAL	GLN	MCH	BRI	DAR	RCH	DOV	MAR	NWS	CLT	CAR	RIV	ATL								102nd	46	
1988	Roush Racing	6	Ford	DAY; 41	RCH; 25	CAR; 12	ATL; 31	DAR; 6	BRI; 2	NWS; 29	MAR; 23	TAL; 12	CLT; 37	DOV; 9	RSD; 7	POC; 4	MCH; 14	DAY; 17	POC; 7	TAL; 7	GLN; 28	MCH; 32	BRI; 27	DAR; 19	RCH; 4	**DOV**; 39	MAR; 9	CLT; 9	NWS; 19	CAR; 28	PHO; 36	ATL; 20								15th	3142	
1989	Roush Racing	6	Ford	DAY; 33	CAR; 5	ATL; 38	RCH; 11	**DAR**; 4	**BRI**; 6	NWS; 3	MAR; 6	**TAL**; 3	CLT; 6	**DOV**; 2	SON; 31	POC; 15	MCH; 12	**DAY**; 16	POC; 3	**TAL**; 3	GLN; 2	MCH; 9	BRI; 20	DAR; 2	RCH; 17	DOV; 2	MAR; 23	CLT; 3	NWS; 2	CAR; 1	PHO; 3	ATL; 30								3rd	4053	
1990	Roush Racing	6	Ford	DAY; 21	RCH; 1	CAR; 26	ATL; 5	DAR; 2	BRI; 2	**NWS**; 6	MAR; 7	TAL; 3	CLT; 3	DOV; 4	SON; 2	POC; 14	**MCH**; 4	DAY; 11	**POC**; 6	TAL; 9	GLN; 5	MCH; 1^{*}	BRI; 3	DAR; 6	RCH; 2	DOV; 2	**MAR**; 3	NWS; 1	CLT; 14	CAR; 11	PHO; 10	ATL; 6								2nd	4404	
1991	Roush Racing	6	Ford	DAY; 21	RCH; 6	CAR; 14	ATL; 17	DAR; 4	BRI; 4	NWS; 9	MAR; 29	TAL; 24	**CLT**; 23	DOV; 5	SON; 9	**POC**; 3	MCH; 3	DAY; 11	POC; 2	TAL; 3	GLN; 3	MCH; 4	BRI; 4	DAR; 29	RCH; 33	DOV; 21	**MAR**; 5	NWS; 5	**CLT**; 35^{*}	CAR; 3	PHO; 19	ATL; 1^{*}								6th	3914	
1992	Roush Racing	6	Ford	DAY; 29	CAR; 5	RCH; 30	**ATL**; 13	DAR; 3	BRI; 15	NWS; 16	MAR; 1	TAL; 8	CLT; 33	DOV; 24	SON; 3	POC; 2	MCH; 6	DAY; 8	POC; 6	TAL; 20	GLN; 4	MCH; 9	BRI; 25	DAR; 2	RCH; 2	DOV; 19	MAR; 8	NWS; 2	CLT; 1	CAR; 30	PHO; 2	ATL; 32								6th	3887	
1993	Roush Racing	6	Ford	DAY; 6	CAR; 5	RCH; 7	ATL; 32^{*}	DAR; 2	BRI; 8	NWS; 31	MAR; 10	TAL; 12	SON; 40	CLT; 28	DOV; 4	POC; 31	MCH; 6^{*}	DAY; 6	**NHA**; 2	POC; 13	TAL; 3	**GLN**; 1^{*}	MCH; 1	**BRI**; 1	DAR; 1^{*}	RCH; 6	DOV; 31	MAR; 16	NWS; 16	CLT; 2	**CAR**; 5	PHO; 1^{*}	ATL; 20							3rd	4150	
1994	Roush Racing	6	Ford	DAY; 13	CAR; 4	RCH; 6	ATL; 5	DAR; 2	BRI; 21	NWS; 13	MAR; 3	TAL; 38	SON; 8	CLT; 32	DOV; 4	POC; 5	MCH; 3	DAY; 4	NHA; 4	POC; 31	TAL; 6	IND; 35	**GLN**; 1^{*}	MCH; 2	BRI; 2	DAR; 25	RCH; 6	DOV; 19	MAR; 16	NWS; 5	CLT; 39	CAR; 7	PHO; 2	**ATL**; 1^{*}						2nd	4250	
1995	Roush Racing	6	Ford	DAY; 3	CAR; 7	RCH; 8	ATL; 9	DAR; 37	**BRI**; 8	NWS; 3	MAR; 5	TAL; 1^{*}	SON; 2	CLT; 28	DOV; 35	POC; 11	MCH; 8	DAY; 4	**NHA**; 3	POC; 7	TAL; 7	IND; 5	**GLN**; 1^{*}	MCH; 38	**BRI**; 5	DAR; 33	RCH; 15	DOV; 8	MAR; 12	NWS; 1^{*}	CLT; 1	CAR; 3	PHO; 8	ATL; 17						4th	4320	
1996	Roush Racing	6	Ford	DAY; 4	CAR; 32	RCH; 5	ATL; 26	DAR; 6	BRI; 3	NWS; 37	MAR; 21	TAL; 34	SON; 2	CLT; 7	DOV; 40	POC; 4	MCH; 7	DAY; 11	NHA; 33	**POC**; 9^{*}	TAL; 3	IND; 4	GLN; 3	MCH; 2^{*}	**BRI**; 3	DAR; 3	**RCH**; 9	DOV; 5	MAR; 9	NWS; 9	CLT; 2	CAR; 7	PHO; 2^{*}	ATL; 7						5th	4278	
1997	Roush Racing	6	Ford	DAY; 7^{*}	**CAR**; 13	RCH; 13	ATL; 6	DAR; 24	TEX; 38	BRI; 3	MAR; 5	**SON**; 1^{*}	TAL; 1	CLT; 3	DOV; 2	POC; 4	MCH; 3	CAL; 10	DAY; 27	NHA; 5	POC; 5	IND; 6	GLN; 5	MCH; 1^{*}	BRI; 2	DAR; 8	RCH; 25	NHA; 9	**DOV**; 1	MAR; 11	CLT; 4	TAL; 30	CAR; 6	PHO; 6	ATL; 3					3rd	4681	
1998	Roush Racing	6	Ford	DAY; 38	CAR; 3^{*}	LVS; 1^{*}	ATL; 25	**DAR**; 7	BRI; 7	TEX; 1	MAR; 29	TAL; 23	CAL; 1^{*}	CLT; 4^{*}	DOV; 7	RCH; 5	MCH; 1	POC; 5	SON; 6	NHA; 2	POC; 2	IND; 2	GLN; 2	MCH; 4	BRI; 1^{*}	NHA; 2	DAR; 40	RCH; 3	**DOV**; 1^{*}	MAR; 3	CLT; 1^{*}	TAL; 34	DAY; 16	PHO; 2	**CAR**; 4	ATL; 3				2nd	4964	
1999	Roush Racing	6	Ford	DAY; 31	CAR; 1	LVS; 10	ATL; 3	DAR; 5	TEX; 34	BRI; 2	MAR; 5	TAL; 3	CAL; 38	RCH; 2	CLT; 3	DOV; 3	MCH; 10	POC; 5	SON; 2	DAY; 17	NHA; 6	POC; 3	IND; 4	GLN; 10	MCH; 7	BRI; 6	DAR; 4	RCH; 35	NHA; 17	DOV; 1^{*}	MAR; 16	CLT; 4	TAL; 15	**CAR**; 6	PHO; 2	HOM; 4	ATL; 4			3rd	4943	
2000	Roush Racing	6	Ford	DAY; 5	CAR; 8	LVS; 3	ATL; 3	DAR; 9	BRI; 16	TEX; 11	MAR; 1	TAL; 6^{*}	CAL; 14	RCH; 32	CLT; 12	DOV; 36	MCH; 40	POC; 5	SON; 3	DAY; 4	NHA; 3	POC; 43	IND; 43	GLN; 2	MCH; 11	BRI; 3	DAR; 14	RCH; 3	NHA; 8	DOV; 6	MAR; 18	CLT; 5	TAL; 7	CAR; 40	PHO; 6	HOM; 3	ATL; 40			8th	4410	
2001	Roush Racing	6	Ford	DAY; 33	CAR; 20	LVS; 6^{*}	ATL; 41	DAR; 21	**BRI**; 34	TEX; 9	MAR; 39	TAL; 4	CAL; 40	**RCH**; 13	CLT; 4	DOV; 9	MCH; 16	POC; 5	SON; 10	DAY; 18	CHI; 17	NHA; 18	POC; 7	IND; 22	GLN; 15	MCH; 8	BRI; 37	DAR; 20	RCH; 19	DOV; 32	KAN; 6	CLT; 9	MAR; 7	TAL; 9	PHO; 19	CAR; 34	HOM; 24	ATL; 22	NHA; 9	12th	4095	
2002	Roush Racing	6	Ford	DAY; 6	CAR; 21	LVS; 3	ATL; 8	DAR; 29	BRI; 11	TEX; 3	MAR; 8	TAL; 37	CAL; 5	RCH; 4	CLT; 1	DOV; 41	POC; 2	MCH; 9	SON; 7	DAY; 5	CHI; 9	NHA; 16	POC; 13	IND; 28	GLN; 10	MCH; 5	BRI; 23	DAR; 11	RCH; 6	NHA; 16	DOV; 2	KAN; 25	TAL; 30	CLT; 16	MAR; 10	ATL; 8	CAR; 2^{*}	PHO; 4	HOM; 4	2nd	4762	
2003	Roush Racing	6	Ford	DAY; 5	CAR; 7	LVS; 43	ATL; 42	DAR; 4	BRI; 29	TEX; 5	TAL; 26	MAR; 17	CAL; 17	RCH; 5	CLT; 29	DOV; 18	POC; 2	MCH; 9	SON; 19	DAY; 20	CHI; 14	NHA; 18	POC; 41	IND; 9	GLN; 10	MCH; 17	BRI; 36	DAR; 33	RCH; 13	NHA; 28	DOV; 22	TAL; 23	KAN; 20	CLT; 11	MAR; 14	ATL; 39	PHO; 10	CAR; 41	HOM; 33	17th	3769	
2004	Roush Racing	6	Ford	DAY; 43	CAR; 12	LVS; 5	ATL; 14	DAR; 7	BRI; 23	TEX; 17	MAR; 34	TAL; 6	CAL; 11	RCH; 7	CLT; 36	DOV; 1	POC; 36	MCH; 34	SON; 8	DAY; 6	CHI; 24	NHA; 14	POC; 2	IND; 25	GLN; 3	MCH; 2	BRI; 13	CAL; 3^{*}	RCH; 5	NHA; 13	DOV; 2	TAL; 15	KAN; 20	CLT; 13	MAR; 12	ATL; 2^{*}	PHO; 15	DAR; 2	HOM; 11	4th	6399	
2005	Roush Racing	6	Ford	DAY; 6	CAL; 7	LVS; 30	ATL; 4	BRI; 31	MAR; 3	TEX; 20	PHO; 16	TAL; 33	DAR; 4	RCH; 15	CLT; 28	DOV; 3	POC; 7	MCH; 3	SON; 15	DAY; 39	CHI; 10	NHA; 15	POC; 3	IND; 7	GLN; 7	MCH; 17	BRI; 16	CAL; 11	RCH; 13	NHA; 7	DOV; 4	TAL; 41	KAN; 1^{*}	CLT; 5	MAR; 34	ATL; 3	TEX; 2	PHO; 14	HOM; 2	4th	6428	
2006	Roush Racing	6	Ford	DAY; 12	CAL; 9	LVS; 6	ATL; 2	BRI; 6	MAR; 13	TEX; 9	PHO; 11	TAL; 35	RCH; 11	DAR; 8	CLT; 4	DOV; 9	POC; 17	MCH; 27	SON; 13	DAY; 33	CHI; 18	NHA; 4	POC; 19	IND; 5	GLN; 20	MCH; 5	BRI; 28	CAL; 12	RCH; 5	NHA; 11	DOV; 14	KAN; 3	TAL; 8	CLT; 30	MAR; 24	ATL; 36	TEX; 22	PHO; 6	HOM; 18	9th	6168	
2007	Ginn Racing	01	Chevy	DAY; 2	CAL; 5	LVS; 5	ATL; 10	BRI	MAR	TEX; 3	PHO; 12	TAL	RCH; 17	DAR; 14	CLT; 11	DOV; 7	POC; 7	MCH; 29	SON	NHA	DAY; 17	CHI; 14																		27th	2960	
2007	Dale Earnhardt, Inc.	01	Chevy																				IND; 6	POC; 9	GLN	MCH; 42	BRI	CAL	RCH; 21	NHA	DOV; 4	KAN; 12	TAL	CLT; 16	MAR	ATL; 43	TEX; 34	PHO	HOM; 9	27th	2960	
2008	Dale Earnhardt, Inc.	8	Chevy	DAY; 31	CAL; 16	LVS; 10	ATL; 22	BRI	MAR	TEX; 8	PHO; 5	TAL	RCH; 3	DAR; 16	CLT; 15	DOV; 23	POC; 10	MCH; 25	SON	NHA	DAY; 10	CHI; 17	IND; 11	POC; 8	GLN	MCH; 6	BRI	CAL	RCH; 5	NHA	DOV; 4	KAN; 18	TAL	CLT; 9	MAR	ATL; 22	TEX; 12	PHO; 14	HOM	28th	3022	
2009	Hendrick Motorsports	5	Chevy	DAY; 16	CAL; 40	LVS; 40	**ATL**; 31	**BRI**; 6	MAR; 7	TEX; 6	**PHO**; 1^{*}	TAL; 43	RCH; 5	DAR; 1	CLT; 17	DOV; 10	POC; 19	MCH; 1	SON; 35	NHA; 14	DAY; 38	CHI; 1^{*}	**IND**; 2	POC; 7	GLN; 23	MCH; 31	**BRI**; 2^{*}	ATL; 5	**RCH**; 4	NHA; 1	DOV; 2	**KAN**; 7	CAL; 4	CLT; 17	MAR; 8	TAL; 28	TEX; 4	PHO; 4	HOM; 12	2nd	6511	
2010	Hendrick Motorsports	5	Chevy	**DAY**; 12	CAL; 4	LVS; 4	ATL; 33	BRI; 35	MAR; 21	PHO; 4	TEX; 6	TAL; 5	RCH; 25	DAR; 16	DOV; 15	CLT; 4	POC; 29	MCH; 16	SON; 14	NHA; 21	DAY; 28	CHI; 15	IND; 11	POC; 7	GLN; 19	MCH; 28	BRI; 23	ATL; 21	RCH; 20	NHA; 29	DOV; 12	KAN; 14	CAL; 6*	CLT; 14	MAR; 2	TAL; 11	TEX; 3	PHO; 8	HOM; 16	13th	4364	
2011	Hendrick Motorsports	5	Chevy	DAY; 10	PHO; 13	LVS; 18	BRI; 12	CAL; 20	MAR; 10	TEX; 36	TAL; 8	RCH; 14	DAR; 19	DOV; 2	CLT; 34	KAN; 21	POC; 18	MCH; 9	SON; 19	**DAY**; 33	KEN; 22	NHA; 22	IND; 8	POC; 13	GLN; 25	MCH; 4	BRI; 38	ATL; 17	RCH; 10	CHI; 9	NHA; 24	DOV; 19	KAN; 10	CLT; 37	**TAL**; 20	MAR; 28	TEX; 19	PHO; 16	HOM; 24	22nd	930	
2012	Michael Waltrip Racing	55	Toyota	DAY; 10	**PHO**; 9	LVS; 18	BRI	CAL; 12	MAR	TEX; 3	KAN; 33	**RCH**; 8	TAL	DAR; 20	CLT; 34	**DOV**; 14	POC; 2	MCH; 29	SON	KEN	DAY	NHA	IND; 11	POC; 12	GLN	**MCH**; 35^{*}	BRI	ATL; 10	RCH; 3	CHI; 14	NHA	DOV; 3	TAL	CLT; 6	KAN; 24	MAR	TEX; 29	PHO; 10	HOM; 16	26th	701	
2013	Michael Waltrip Racing	55	Toyota	DAY; 3	**PHO**; 21	LVS; 14	BRI	CAL; 37		TEX; 14	KAN; 9	RCH; 38	TAL	DAR; 25	CLT; 34	DOV; 9	POC; 19	MCH; 26	SON	KEN	DAY	NHA	IND; 23	POC; 18	GLN	MCH; 27														25th	649	
2013	Joe Gibbs Racing	11	Toyota						MAR; 10																															25th	649	
2013	Stewart–Haas Racing	14	Chevy																								BRI; 20	ATL; 25	RCH; 9	CHI; 17	NHA; 23	DOV; 19	KAN; 22	CLT; 42	TAL	MAR; 36	TEX; 11	PHO; 15	HOM; 19	25th	649	

===== Daytona 500 =====
Year	Team	Manufacturer	Start	Finish
1982	Martin-Reeder Racing	Buick	26	30
1983	Jim Stacy Racing	Buick	12	28
1986	Gunderman Racing	Ford	24	37
1988	Roush Racing	Ford	38	41
1989	Roush Racing	Ford	5	33
1990	Roush Racing	Ford	7	21
1991	Roush Racing	Ford	18	21
1992	Roush Racing	Ford	5	29
1993	Roush Racing	Ford	23	6
1994	Roush Racing	Ford	7	13
1995	Roush Racing	Ford	6	3
1996	Roush Racing	Ford	15	4
1997	Roush Racing	Ford	11	7
1998	Roush Racing	Ford	15	38
1999	Roush Racing	Ford	9	31
2000	Roush Racing	Ford	9	5
2001	Roush Racing	Ford	22	33
2002	Roush Racing	Ford	39	6
2003	Roush Racing	Ford	26	5
2004	Roush Racing	Ford	8	43
2005	Roush Racing	Ford	32	6
2006	Roush Racing	Ford	10	12
2007	Ginn Racing	Chevrolet	26	2
2008	Dale Earnhardt, Inc.	Chevrolet	12	31
2009	Hendrick Motorsports	Chevrolet	2	16
2010	Hendrick Motorsports	Chevrolet	**1**	12
2011	Hendrick Motorsports	Chevrolet	17	10
2012	Michael Waltrip Racing	Toyota	22	10
2013	Michael Waltrip Racing	Toyota	14	3

==== Nationwide Series ====
NASCAR Nationwide Series results
Year	Team	No.	Make	1	2	3	4	5	6	7	8	9	10	11	12	13	14	15	16	17	18	19	20	21	22	23	24	25	26	27	28	29	30	31	32	33	34	35	Rank	Pts	Ref
1982	Whitaker Racing	26		DAY	RCH	BRI	MAR	DAR	HCY	SBO	CRW	RCH	LGY	DOV	HCY	CLT	ASH	HCY	SBO	CAR	CRW	SBO	HCY	LGY	IRP; 26	BRI	HCY	RCH	MAR										161st	85	
1982	Zervakis Racing Team	02	Pontiac																											CLT; DNQ	HCY	MAR							161st	85	
1987	Lawmaster Racing	31	Ford	DAY; 6	HCY; 11	MAR; 6	DAR; 38	BRI; 6	LGY; 18	**SBO**; 18	CLT; 11	DOV; 1	IRP; 7	**ROU**; 1^{*}	**JFC**; 4	OXF; 30	SBO; 11	HCY; 7	RAL; 29	LGY; 9	**ROU**; 7	**BRI**; 27	**JFC**; 8	DAR; 40	RCH; 1	DOV; 31	MAR; 3	CLT; 32	CAR; 28	MAR; 26									8th	3265	
1988	Bill Davis Racing	06	Ford	DAY; 4	HCY	CAR; 1	MAR	DAR; 9	BRI; 23	LNG	NZH	SBO	NSV	CLT; 33	DOV	ROU	LAN	LVL	MYB	OXF	SBO	HCY	LNG	IRP; 7	ROU	BRI; 10	DAR; 38	RCH; 9	DOV; 35	MAR; 18	CLT; 36	CAR; 39	MAR						30th	1211	
1989	Bill Davis Racing	1	Ford	DAY; 21	CAR; 31	MAR; 9	HCY	DAR; 2	BRI; 2	NZH; 35	SBO	LAN	NSV	CLT; 39	DOV; 4	ROU	LVL	VOL	MYB; 26	SBO	HCY	DUB	IRP; 2	ROU	BRI; 1^{*}	DAR; 42	RCH; 8^{*}	DOV; 2^{*}	MAR; 17	CLT; 20	**CAR**; 24	MAR							21st	1832	
1990	Bill Davis Racing	1	Ford	DAY	RCH; 35	CAR; 8	MAR	HCY	DAR; 36	BRI; 4	LAN	SBO	NZH	HCY	CLT; 31	DOV; 24	ROU	VOL	MYB; 1	OXF	NHA	SBO	DUB	IRP	ROU	BRI; 6	DAR; 28^{*}	RCH	DOV; 34	MAR	CLT; 16	NHA	CAR; 4^{*}	MAR					31st	1321	
1991	Bill Davis Racing	01	Ford	DAY	RCH	CAR	MAR	VOL	HCY; 28	DAR	BRI	LAN	SBO	NZH	CLT	DOV	ROU	HCY	MYB	GLN	OXF	NHA	SBO	DUB	IRP	ROU	BRI	DAR	RCH	DOV	CLT	NHA	CAR	MAR					102nd	79	
1992	Roush Racing	60	Ford	DAY; 7	CAR; 2	RCH	ATL; 8	MAR	**DAR**; 32	BRI	HCY	LAN	DUB	NZH; 3^{*}	CLT; 33^{*}	DOV	ROU	MYB	GLN; 30	VOL	NHA	TAL; 27	IRP	ROU	MCH	NHA	BRI	**DAR**; 6	RCH; 3	DOV	CLT; 31	MAR; 7	CAR; 1^{*}	HCY; 5					21st	1775	
1993	Roush Racing	60	Ford	DAY; DNQ	CAR; 1^{*}	RCH; 1^{*}	DAR; 30	BRI; 27	HCY; 26	ROU	MAR	NZH	CLT; 35	DOV	MYB	GLN	MLW	TAL; 33	IRP	MCH; 1^{*}	NHA	BRI	DAR; 1^{*}	RCH; 1^{*}	DOV	ROU	CLT; 1^{*}	MAR	CAR; 1^{*}	HCY	**ATL**; 26								24th	1744	
1993	DAJ Racing	32	Chevy	DAY; 42																																			24th	1744	
1994	Roush Racing	60	Ford	DAY; 23	CAR; 8^{*}	RCH; 8	ATL; 29	MAR	**DAR**; 1^{*}	HCY	BRI; 11^{*}	ROU	NHA	NZH	CLT; 2^{*}	DOV; 3	MYB	GLN	MLW	SBO	TAL; 43	HCY	IRP	MCH; 3^{*}		DAR; 1^{*}	RCH; 2	DOV	**CLT**; 2^{*}	MAR	CAR; 1^{*}								20th	2132	
1994	Ernie Irvan Racing	28	Ford																						BRI; 10														20th	2132	
1995	Roush Racing	60	Ford	DAY; 8^{*}	CAR; 2	RCH; 33	**ATL**; 39	NSV	DAR; 3	BRI; 2^{*}	HCY	NHA	NZH	CLT; 4	DOV; 41	MYB	GLN	MLW	TAL; 30	SBO	IRP	MCH; 1	BRI	DAR; 1^{*}	RCH; 2^{*}	DOV	CLT; 1^{*}	CAR; 8	HOM; 5										22nd	2037	
1996	Roush Racing	60	Ford	DAY; 3	**CAR**; 1^{*}	RCH; 35^{*}	ATL; 7^{*}	NSV	DAR; 1	BRI; 1^{*}	HCY	NZH	CLT; 1	DOV	SBO	MYB	GLN	MLW	NHA	TAL; 27	IRP	MCH; 4^{*}	BRI	**DAR**; 2	RCH; 4	DOV	CLT; 1^{*}	CAR; 1^{*}	HOM; 3										21st	2186	
1997	Roush Racing	60	Ford	DAY; 35	**CAR**; 1^{*}	RCH; 1	ATL; 1^{*}	LVS	DAR; 4	HCY	TEX; 1	BRI; 38	NSV	TAL; 1^{*}	NHA	NZH	CLT; 3	DOV	SBO	GLN	MLW	MYB	GTY	IRP	MCH; 11^{*}	BRI	DAR; 6	RCH; 8	DOV	CLT; 2	CAL	CAR; 1	HOM; 3						24th	2104	
1998	Roush Racing	60	Ford	DAY; 3	CAR; 3	**LVS**; 6	NSV	DAR; 24	BRI	TEX; 21	HCY	TAL; 29	NHA	NZH	CLT; 1^{*}	DOV	RCH; 5	PPR	GLN	MLW	MYB	CAL	SBO	IRP	MCH; 6	BRI	DAR; 8	RCH; 35	DOV	CLT; 43	GTY	CAR; 3	ATL; 1	HOM; 3					27th	1976	
1999	Roush Racing	60	Ford	DAY; 39	CAR; 2	**LVS**; 1^{*}	ATL; 6	**DAR**; 39	TEX; 1	NSV	BRI	TAL; DNQ	CAL	NHA	RCH; 1	NZH	CLT; 1^{*}	DOV	SBO	GLN	MLW	MYB	PPR	GTY	IRP	MCH; 5	BRI	DAR; 1^{*}	RCH; 2^{*}	DOV	CLT; 36	**CAR**; 1^{*}	MEM	PHO	HOM; 14				26th	2048	
2000	Roush Racing	60	Ford	DAY	**CAR**; 1^{*}	LVS; 2	ATL; 1^{*}	**DAR**; 1	BRI	TEX; 1	NSV	TAL	CAL	RCH; 4^{*}	NHA	CLT; 2	DOV; 2	SBO	MYB	GLN	MLW	NZH	PPR	GTY	IRP	MCH; DNQ	BRI	**DAR**; 1	RCH; 3	DOV	CLT; 2	CAR; 6	MEM	PHO	HOM; 2^{*}				27th	2280	
2004	Roush Racing	9	Ford	DAY; DNQ	CAR	LVS	DAR	BRI	TEX	NSH	TAL	CAL	GTY	RCH	NZH	CLT	DOV	NSH	KEN	MLW	DAY	CHI	NHA	PPR	IRP	MCH; 2	BRI	CAL	RCH; 12	DOV; 8	KAN	CLT	MEM	ATL; 6	PHO; 6	DAR	HOM		56th	617	
2005	Roush Racing	9	Ford	DAY	CAL; 1^{*}	MXC	LVS; 1	ATL	NSH	BRI	TEX; 31	PHO	TAL	DAR	RCH; 7	CLT	DOV	NSH	KEN	MLW	DAY	CHI; 5	NHA	PPR	GTY	IRP	GLN	MCH	BRI	CAL	**RCH**; 4	DOV	KAN; 14	CLT	MEM	TEX	PHO	HOM; 3	43rd	1212	
2006	Roush Racing	6	Ford	DAY	CAL	MXC	LVS	ATL	BRI	TEX; 24	NSH	PHO; 5	TAL	RCH	DAR; 4	CLT; 32	DOV	NSH	KEN	MLW	DAY	CHI	NHA	MAR	GTY	IRP	GLN	**MCH**; 5	BRI	CAL; 3^{*}	RCH	DOV	KAN	CLT	MEM	**TEX**; 4	PHO	HOM	44th	973	
2007	Roush Racing	06	Ford	DAY; 5	CAL	MXC	LVS	ATL	BRI	NSH	TEX; 12	PHO	TAL	RCH																									55th	743	
2007	Hendrick Motorsports	5	Chevy												DAR; 2	CLT	DOV	NSH	KEN	MLW	NHA	DAY	CHI	GTY	IRP	CGV	GLN	MCH; 14	BRI	CAL	RCH	DOV	KAN	CLT	MEM	TEX	PHO	HOM; 2	55th	743	
2008	JR Motorsports	5	Chevy	DAY	CAL	LVS; 1^{*}	ATL	BRI	NSH	TEX	PHO	MXC	TAL	RCH	DAR; 23	CLT	DOV	NSH	KEN	MLW	NHA	DAY	CHI	GTY	IRP	CGV	GLN	MCH; 4	BRI	CAL	RCH	DOV	KAN; 38	CLT	MEM	TEX; 3	PHO	HOM	57th	663	
2009	JR Motorsports	5	Chevy	DAY	CAL	LVS	BRI	TEX	NSH	PHO	TAL	RCH; 7	DAR	CLT	DOV	NSH	KEN	MLW	NHA	DAY	CHI	GTY	IRP	IOW	GLN	MCH	BRI	CGV	ATL	RCH	DOV	KAN	CAL	CLT	MEM	TEX	PHO	HOM	112th	146	
2011	Turner Motorsports	32	Chevy	DAY	PHO	LVS; 1	BRI	CAL; 8	TEX	TAL	NSH	RCH	DAR	DOV	IOW	CLT	CHI	MCH; 7	ROA	DAY	KEN; 14	NHA	NSH	IRP	IOW	GLN	CGV	BRI	ATL	RCH	CHI	DOV	KAN	CLT	TEX	PHO	HOM		94th	0^{1}	
2012	Joe Gibbs Racing	18	Toyota	DAY	PHO	LVS; 2	BRI	CAL	TEX	RCH	TAL	DAR	IOW	CLT	DOV	MCH	ROA	KEN	DAY	NHA	CHI	IND	IOW	GLN	CGV	BRI	ATL	RCH	CHI	KEN	DOV	CLT	KAN	TEX	PHO	HOM			113th	0^{1}	

==== Camping World Truck Series ====
NASCAR Camping World Truck Series results
Year	Team	No.	Make	1	2	3	4	5	6	7	8	9	10	11	12	13	14	15	16	17	18	19	20	21	22	23	24	25	Rank	Pts	Ref
1996	Roush Racing	99	Ford	HOM	PHO	POR	EVG	TUS	CNS	HPT	BRI	NZH	MLW	LVL	I70	IRP	FLM	GLN	NSV	RCH; 3	NHA	MAR	NWS; 1	SON	MMR	PHO	LVS		55th	350	
2005	Roush Racing	33	Ford	DAY	CAL	ATL	MAR	GTY	MFD	CLT	DOV	TEX	MCH	MLW	KAN	KEN	MEM	IRP	NSH	BRI	RCH	NHA	LVS	MAR	ATL	TEX	PHO	HOM; 8	70th	147	
2006	Roush Racing	6	Ford	**DAY**; 1^{*}	CAL; 1^{*}	ATL; 2^{*}	MAR; 4	GTY	CLT; 13	MFD	DOV; 1^{*}	TEX	MCH; 2^{*}	MLW	KAN	KEN	MEM	IRP	NSH	**BRI**; 1^{*}	NHA; 10	LVS	**TAL**; 1^{*}	MAR; 4	ATL; 36	TEX	PHO; 2^{*}	HOM; 1^{*}	19th	2313	
2007	Wood Brothers Racing	21	Ford	DAY	CAL; 23	ATL	MAR	KAN	CLT; 4	MFD	DOV; 6	TEX	MCH; 33	MLW	MEM	KEN	IRP	NSH	BRI; 3	GTW	NHA	LVS	TAL	MAR	ATL; 4	TEX	PHO	HOM	38th	808	
2011	Turner Motorsports	32	Chevy	DAY	PHO	DAR	MAR	NSH	DOV	CLT	KAN	TEX	KEN	IOW	NSH	IRP	POC; 7	MCH; 14	BRI	ATL	CHI	NHA	KEN	LVS	TAL	MAR	TEX	HOM	90th	0^{1}	

^{*} Season still in progress
^{1} Ineligible for series points

=== ARCA Permatex SuperCar Series ===
ARCA Permatex SuperCar Series results
Year	Team	No.	Make	1	2	3	4	5	6	7	8	9	Rank	Pts	Ref
1981		02	Chevrolet	DAY	NWS	FRS	FRS	BFS	TAL; 1*	IMS	FRS	MCH	20th	210	

=== International Race of Champions ===
(key) (Bold – Pole position. * – Most laps led.)

International Race of Champions results
Year	Make	1	2	3	4	Pos.	Pts	Ref
1990	Dodge	TAL; 3	CLE; 6	MCH; 3		4th	37	
1991	Dodge	DAY; 7	TAL; 3	MCH; 4	GLN; 2	3rd	56	
1994	Dodge	DAY; 4	DAR; 1*	TAL; 12	MCH; 2	1st	66	
1995	Dodge	DAY; 8	DAR; 1*	TAL; 3	MCH; 5	2nd	57	
1996	Pontiac	DAY; 8	TAL; 11	CLT; 1*	MCH; 1	1st	61	
1997	Pontiac	DAY; 2	CLT; 1	CAL; 1	MCH; 8	1st	72	
1998	Pontiac	DAY; 3*	CAL; 1*	MCH; 2	IND; 1	1st	86	
1999	Pontiac	DAY; 3*	TAL; 3	MCH; 5	IND; 1*	2nd	74	
2000	Pontiac	DAY; 4	TAL; 2	MCH; 4	IND; 1*	2nd	71	
2003	Pontiac	DAY; 1*	TAL; 5	CHI; 5	IND; 5	2nd	58	
2005	Pontiac	DAY; 1	TEX; 2	RCH; 1	ATL; 2	1st	89	
2006	Pontiac	**DAY**; 12	**TEX**; 4*	DAY; 9	ATL; 6*	5th	47	

=== Rolex Sports Car Series ===
(key) Bold – pole position

Grand-Am Rolex Sports Car Series DP results
Year	Team	No.	Chassis	1	2	3	4	5	6	7	8	9	10	11	12	13	14	Pos	Pts
2007	Southard Motorsports	3	Lexus / Riley Technologies	DAY	MEX	HOM	VIR	LGA	WGL	MOH	DAY	IOW; 8	BAR	MON	WGL	INF	MIL	72nd	23

Sporting positions
Preceded by Davey Allison; Dale Earnhardt; Matt Kenseth	IROC Champion; IROC XVIII (1994); IROC XX (1996), IROC XXI (1997), IROC XXII (1998); IROC XXIX (2005)	Succeeded by Dale Earnhardt Tony Stewart
Preceded by Rodney Combs; Dick Trickle	ASA National Tour Champion; 1978, 1979, 1980; 1986	Succeeded by Mike Eddy; Butch Miller
Achievements
Preceded by Darrell Waltrip; Kyle Busch	Southern 500 Winner; 1993; 2009	Succeeded by Bill Elliott; Denny Hamlin
Preceded by Jeff Burton	Coca-Cola 600 Winner; 2002	Succeeded by Jimmie Johnson
Preceded by Rusty Wallace	Bud Shootout Winner; 1999	Succeeded by Dale Jarrett
