= 1991 Mello Yello 500 =

26th race of the 1991 NASCAR Winston Cup Series

Race details
- Race 26 of 29 in the 1991 NASCAR Winston Cup Series
- The 1991 Mello Yello 500 program cover, featuring Kyle Petty. Artwork by NASCAR artist Sam Bass.
- Date: October 6, 1991
- Official name: 32nd Annual Mello Yello 500
- Location: Concord, North Carolina, Charlotte Motor Speedway
- Course: Permanent racing facility
- Course length: 1.5 miles (2.41 km)
- Distance: 334 laps, 501 mi (806.281 km)
- Scheduled distance: 334 laps, 501 mi (806.281 km)
- Average speed: 138.984 miles per hour (223.673 km/h)
- Attendance: 159,000

Pole position
Driver	Mark Martin	Roush Racing
- Time: 30.595

Most laps led
Driver	Mark Martin	Roush Racing
- Laps: 198

Winner
No. 11	Geoff Bodine	Junior Johnson & Associates

Television in the United States
- Network: TBS
- Announcers: Ken Squier, Neil Bonnett

Radio in the United States
- Radio: Performance Racing Network

The 1991 Mello Yello 500 was the 26th stock car race of the 1991 NASCAR Winston Cup Series and the 32nd iteration of the event. The race was held on Sunday, October 6, 1991, before an audience of 159,000 in Concord, North Carolina, at Charlotte Motor Speedway, a 1.5 miles (2.4 km) permanent quad-oval. The race took the scheduled 334 laps to complete. Running on fumes, Junior Johnson & Associates driver Geoff Bodine would manage to run the final 76 laps of the race on one tank of fuel to take his 11th career NASCAR Winston Cup Series victory and his only victory of the season. To fill out the top three, Robert Yates Racing driver Davey Allison and owner-driver Alan Kulwicki would finish second and third, respectively.

With a poor finish from Dale Earnhardt's nearest competitor in the driver's championship standings, Ricky Rudd, Earnhardt was considered the favorite to win the driver's championship, having a 138-point lead over Rudd.

== Background ==
The layout of Charlotte Motor Speedway, the venue where the race was held.

Charlotte Motor Speedway is a motorsports complex located in Concord, North Carolina, United States 13 miles from Charlotte, North Carolina. The complex features a 1.5 miles (2.4 km) quad oval track that hosts NASCAR racing including the prestigious Coca-Cola 600 on Memorial Day weekend and the NEXTEL All-Star Challenge, as well as the UAW-GM Quality 500. The speedway was built in 1959 by Bruton Smith and is considered the home track for NASCAR with many race teams located in the Charlotte area. The track is owned and operated by Speedway Motorsports Inc. (SMI) with Marcus G. Smith (son of Bruton Smith) as track president.

=== Entry list ===
- (R) denotes rookie driver.

#	Driver	Team	Make
1	Rick Mast	Precision Products Racing	Oldsmobile
2	Rusty Wallace	Penske Racing South	Pontiac
3	Dale Earnhardt	Richard Childress Racing	Chevrolet
4	Ernie Irvan	Morgan–McClure Motorsports	Chevrolet
5	Ricky Rudd	Hendrick Motorsports	Chevrolet
6	Mark Martin	Roush Racing	Ford
7	Alan Kulwicki	AK Racing	Ford
8	Rick Wilson	Stavola Brothers Racing	Buick
9	Bill Elliott	Melling Racing	Ford
10	Derrike Cope	Whitcomb Racing	Chevrolet
11	Geoff Bodine	Junior Johnson & Associates	Ford
12	Hut Stricklin	Bobby Allison Motorsports	Buick
13	Mike Skinner	Mansion Motorsports	Chevrolet
15	Morgan Shepherd	Bud Moore Engineering	Ford
17	Darrell Waltrip	Darrell Waltrip Motorsports	Chevrolet
19	Chad Little	Little Racing	Ford
20	Buddy Baker	Moroso Racing	Oldsmobile
21	Dale Jarrett	Wood Brothers Racing	Ford
22	Sterling Marlin	Junior Johnson & Associates	Ford
24	Jimmy Hensley	Team III Racing	Pontiac
25	Ken Schrader	Hendrick Motorsports	Chevrolet
26	Brett Bodine	King Racing	Buick
27	Gary Balough	Linro Motorsports	Pontiac
28	Davey Allison	Robert Yates Racing	Ford
30	Michael Waltrip	Bahari Racing	Pontiac
33	Harry Gant	Leo Jackson Motorsports	Oldsmobile
41	Larry Pearson	Larry Hedrick Motorsports	Chevrolet
42	Kyle Petty	SABCO Racing	Pontiac
43	Richard Petty	Petty Enterprises	Pontiac
47	Greg Sacks	Close Racing	Oldsmobile
49	Stanley Smith (R)	BS&S Motorsports	Buick
51	Jeff Purvis (R)	Phoenix Racing	Chevrolet
52	Jimmy Means	Jimmy Means Racing	Pontiac
53	Bobby Hillin Jr.	Team Ireland	Chevrolet
55	Ted Musgrave (R)	U.S. Racing	Pontiac
66	Dorsey Schroeder	Cale Yarborough Motorsports	Pontiac
68	Bobby Hamilton (R)	TriStar Motorsports	Oldsmobile
71	Dave Marcis	Marcis Auto Racing	Chevrolet
74	Mike Potter	Wawak Racing	Pontiac
75	Joe Ruttman	RahMoc Enterprises	Oldsmobile
87	Randy Baker	Buck Baker Racing	Chevrolet
89	Jim Sauter	Mueller Brothers Racing	Pontiac
90	Wally Dallenbach Jr. (R)	Donlavey Racing	Ford
94	Terry Labonte	Hagan Racing	Oldsmobile
95	Kerry Teague	Sadler Brothers Racing	Oldsmobile
98	Jimmy Spencer	Travis Carter Enterprises	Chevrolet
99	Brad Teague	Ball Motorsports	Chevrolet

== Qualifying ==
Qualifying was split into two rounds. The first round was originally scheduled to be held on Wednesday, October 2, at 5:00 PM EST, but was delayed to Thursday, October 3, at 8:30 AM EST due to rain. Each driver would have one lap to set a time. During the first round, the top 20 drivers in the round would be guaranteed a starting spot in the race. If a driver was not able to guarantee a spot in the first round, they had the option to scrub their time from the first round and try and run a faster lap time in a second round qualifying run, held on Thursday, October 3, at 1:30 PM EST. As with the first round, each driver would have one lap to set a time. For this specific race, positions 21-40 would be decided on time, and depending on who needed it, a select amount of positions were given to cars who had not otherwise qualified but were high enough in owner's points; up to two were given. If needed, a past champion who did not qualify on either time or provisionals could use a champion's provisional, adding one more spot to the field.

Mark Martin, driving for Roush Racing, would win the pole, setting a time of 30.595 and an average speed of 176.499 miles per hour (284.048 km/h) in the first round.

Six drivers would fail to qualify.

=== Full qualifying results ===
Pos.	#	Driver	Team	Make	Time	Speed
1	6	Mark Martin	Roush Racing	Ford	30.595	176.499
2	28	Davey Allison	Robert Yates Racing	Ford	30.767	175.513
3	7	Alan Kulwicki	AK Racing	Ford	30.850	175.041
4	4	Ernie Irvan	Morgan–McClure Motorsports	Chevrolet	30.887	174.831
5	25	Ken Schrader	Hendrick Motorsports	Chevrolet	30.925	174.616
6	11	Geoff Bodine	Junior Johnson & Associates	Ford	30.981	174.300
7	42	Kyle Petty	SABCO Racing	Pontiac	30.984	174.284
8	2	Rusty Wallace	Penske Racing South	Pontiac	31.024	174.059
9	9	Bill Elliott	Melling Racing	Ford	31.081	173.740
10	5	Ricky Rudd	Hendrick Motorsports	Chevrolet	31.135	173.438
11	30	Michael Waltrip	Bahari Racing	Pontiac	31.148	173.366
12	17	Darrell Waltrip	Darrell Waltrip Motorsports	Chevrolet	31.149	173.360
13	22	Sterling Marlin	Junior Johnson & Associates	Ford	31.201	173.071
14	68	Bobby Hamilton (R)	TriStar Motorsports	Oldsmobile	31.222	172.955
15	3	Dale Earnhardt	Richard Childress Racing	Chevrolet	31.224	172.944
16	12	Hut Stricklin	Bobby Allison Motorsports	Buick	31.230	172.911
17	33	Harry Gant	Leo Jackson Motorsports	Oldsmobile	31.243	172.839
18	1	Rick Mast	Precision Products Racing	Oldsmobile	31.293	172.563
19	26	Brett Bodine	King Racing	Buick	31.297	172.540
20	15	Morgan Shepherd	Bud Moore Engineering	Ford	31.375	172.112
Failed to lock in Round 1
21	47	Greg Sacks	Close Racing	Oldsmobile	31.396	171.996
22	21	Dale Jarrett	Wood Brothers Racing	Ford	31.447	171.717
23	8	Rick Wilson	Stavola Brothers Racing	Buick	31.447	171.717
24	94	Terry Labonte	Hagan Racing	Oldsmobile	31.487	171.499
25	24	Jimmy Hensley	Team III Racing	Pontiac	31.517	171.336
26	10	Derrike Cope	Whitcomb Racing	Chevrolet	31.612	170.821
27	19	Chad Little	Little Racing	Ford	31.632	170.713
28	71	Dave Marcis	Marcis Auto Racing	Chevrolet	31.732	170.175
29	52	Jimmy Means	Jimmy Means Racing	Pontiac	31.781	169.913
30	49	Stanley Smith (R)	BS&S Motorsports	Buick	31.806	169.779
31	55	Ted Musgrave (R)	U.S. Racing	Pontiac	31.816	169.726
32	75	Joe Ruttman	RahMoc Enterprises	Oldsmobile	31.863	169.476
33	98	Jimmy Spencer	Travis Carter Enterprises	Chevrolet	32.037	168.555
34	27	Gary Balough	Linro Motorsports	Pontiac	32.048	168.497
35	53	Bobby Hillin Jr.	Team Ireland	Chevrolet	32.051	168.481
36	66	Dorsey Schroeder	Cale Yarborough Motorsports	Pontiac	32.309	167.136
37	95	Kerry Teague	Sadler Brothers Racing	Oldsmobile	32.349	166.929
38	99	Brad Teague	Ball Motorsports	Chevrolet	32.369	166.826
39	43	Richard Petty	Petty Enterprises	Pontiac	32.406	166.636
40	13	Mike Skinner	Mansion Motorsports	Chevrolet	32.526	166.021
Provisional
41	90	Wally Dallenbach Jr. (R)	Donlavey Racing	Ford	-*	-*
Failed to qualify
42	20	Buddy Baker	Moroso Racing	Oldsmobile	-*	-*
43	51	Jeff Purvis (R)	Phoenix Racing	Chevrolet	-*	-*
44	74	Mike Potter	Wawak Racing	Pontiac	-*	-*
45	89	Jim Sauter	Mueller Brothers Racing	Pontiac	-*	-*
46	87	Randy Baker	Buck Baker Racing	Chevrolet	-*	-*
47	41	Larry Pearson	Larry Hedrick Motorsports	Chevrolet	-	-
Official first round qualifying results
Official starting lineup

== Race results ==
Fin	St	#	Driver	Team	Make	Laps	Led	Status	Pts	Winnings
1	6	11	Geoff Bodine	Junior Johnson & Associates	Ford	334	23	running	180	$92,200
2	2	28	Davey Allison	Robert Yates Racing	Ford	334	57	running	175	$69,350
3	3	7	Alan Kulwicki	AK Racing	Ford	333	0	running	165	$47,250
4	17	33	Harry Gant	Leo Jackson Motorsports	Oldsmobile	333	0	running	160	$31,350
5	13	22	Sterling Marlin	Junior Johnson & Associates	Ford	331	0	running	155	$25,100
6	24	94	Terry Labonte	Hagan Racing	Oldsmobile	330	0	running	150	$20,300
7	11	30	Michael Waltrip	Bahari Racing	Pontiac	330	0	running	146	$17,700
8	19	26	Brett Bodine	King Racing	Buick	330	0	running	142	$16,000
9	12	17	Darrell Waltrip	Darrell Waltrip Motorsports	Chevrolet	329	0	running	138	$12,500
10	27	19	Chad Little	Little Racing	Ford	329	0	running	134	$12,300
11	9	9	Bill Elliott	Melling Racing	Ford	329	0	running	130	$16,700
12	39	43	Richard Petty	Petty Enterprises	Pontiac	329	0	running	127	$11,400
13	18	1	Rick Mast	Precision Products Racing	Oldsmobile	329	0	running	124	$10,600
14	31	55	Ted Musgrave (R)	U.S. Racing	Pontiac	328	0	running	121	$9,050
15	7	42	Kyle Petty	SABCO Racing	Pontiac	327	0	running	118	$13,625
16	32	75	Joe Ruttman	RahMoc Enterprises	Oldsmobile	326	0	running	115	$8,200
17	23	8	Rick Wilson	Stavola Brothers Racing	Buick	325	0	running	112	$7,800
18	35	53	Bobby Hillin Jr.	Team Ireland	Chevrolet	324	0	running	109	$4,600
19	41	90	Wally Dallenbach Jr. (R)	Donlavey Racing	Ford	323	0	running	106	$4,700
20	25	24	Jimmy Hensley	Team III Racing	Pontiac	323	0	running	103	$6,150
21	38	99	Brad Teague	Ball Motorsports	Chevrolet	322	0	running	100	$4,175
22	30	49	Stanley Smith (R)	BS&S Motorsports	Buick	321	0	running	97	$4,050
23	33	98	Jimmy Spencer	Travis Carter Enterprises	Chevrolet	319	0	ignition	94	$6,700
24	29	52	Jimmy Means	Jimmy Means Racing	Pontiac	313	0	ignition	91	$3,850
25	15	3	Dale Earnhardt	Richard Childress Racing	Chevrolet	302	56	valve	93	$22,460
26	22	21	Dale Jarrett	Wood Brothers Racing	Ford	302	0	valve	85	$6,380
27	8	2	Rusty Wallace	Penske Racing South	Pontiac	296	0	running	82	$4,775
28	20	15	Morgan Shepherd	Bud Moore Engineering	Ford	292	0	accident	79	$10,525
29	14	68	Bobby Hamilton (R)	TriStar Motorsports	Oldsmobile	283	0	engine	76	$4,100
30	4	4	Ernie Irvan	Morgan–McClure Motorsports	Chevrolet	263	0	accident	73	$12,875
31	21	47	Greg Sacks	Close Racing	Oldsmobile	252	0	engine	70	$3,300
32	10	5	Ricky Rudd	Hendrick Motorsports	Chevrolet	232	0	accident	67	$10,550
33	26	10	Derrike Cope	Whitcomb Racing	Chevrolet	225	0	accident	64	$5,825
34	28	71	Dave Marcis	Marcis Auto Racing	Chevrolet	225	0	accident	61	$11,575
35	1	6	Mark Martin	Roush Racing	Ford	212	198	engine	68	$70,955
36	16	12	Hut Stricklin	Bobby Allison Motorsports	Buick	135	0	piston	55	$5,740
37	37	95	Kerry Teague	Sadler Brothers Racing	Oldsmobile	124	0	accident	52	$3,125
38	5	25	Ken Schrader	Hendrick Motorsports	Chevrolet	59	0	piston	49	$6,615
39	34	27	Gary Balough	Linro Motorsports	Pontiac	42	0	camshaft	46	$3,110
40	40	13	Mike Skinner	Mansion Motorsports	Chevrolet	12	0	oil line	43	$3,105
41	36	66	Dorsey Schroeder	Cale Yarborough Motorsports	Pontiac	2	0	head gasket	40	$5,105
Official race results

== Standings after the race ==
Drivers' Championship standings

	Pos	Driver	Points
	1	Dale Earnhardt	3,843
	2	Ricky Rudd	3,705 (-138)
1	3	Davey Allison	3,606 (-237)
1	4	Harry Gant	3,546 (–297)
2	5	Ernie Irvan	3,525 (–318)
	6	Mark Martin	3,448 (–395)
1	7	Sterling Marlin	3,381 (–462)
1	8	Ken Schrader	3,366 (–477)
	9	Darrell Waltrip	3,330 (–513)
	10	Rusty Wallace	3,236 (–607)
Official driver's standings

- Note: Only the first 10 positions are included for the driver standings.

Previous race: 1991 Tyson Holly Farms 400	NASCAR Winston Cup Series; 1991 season	Next race: 1991 AC Delco 500
