= IROC XX =

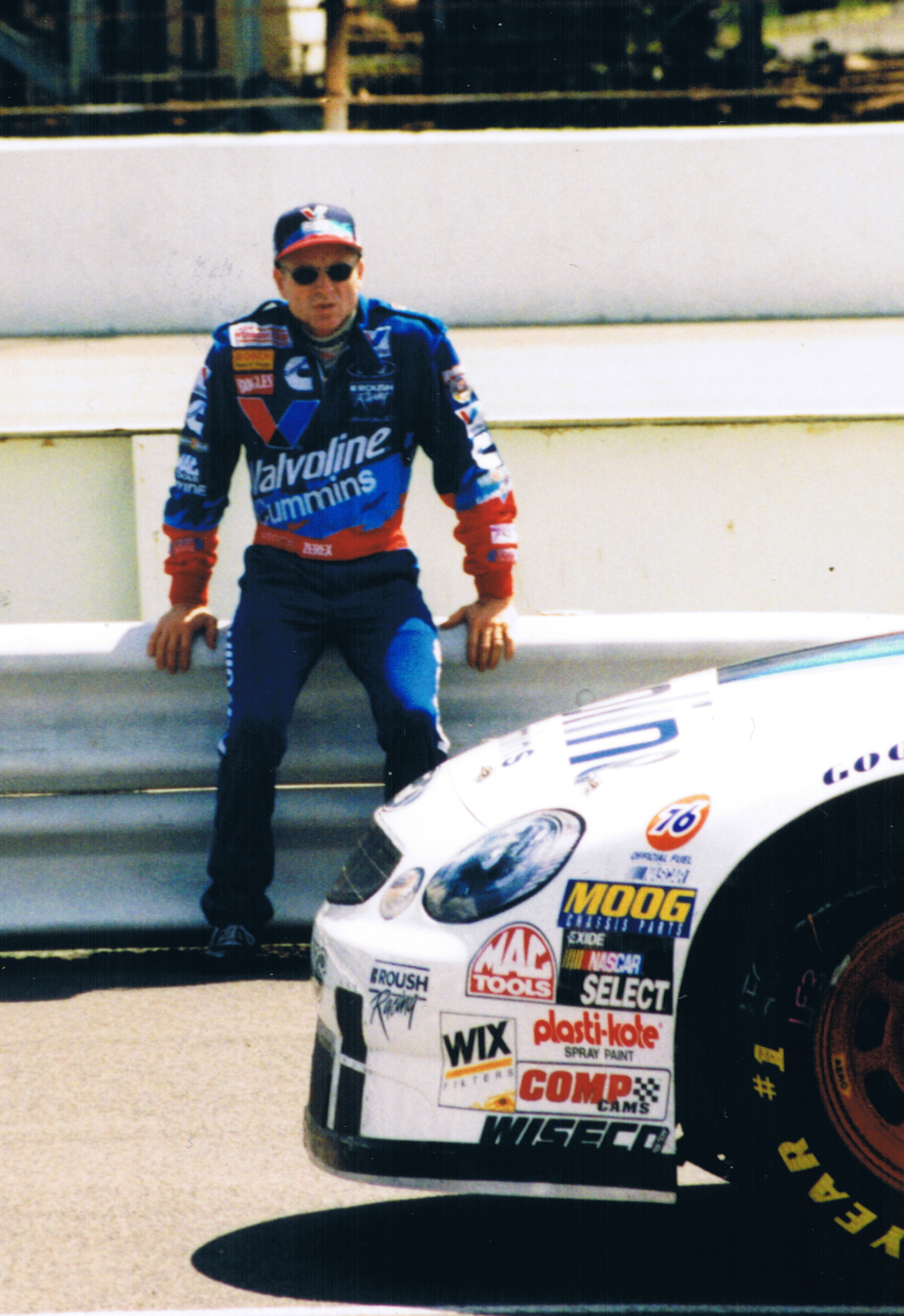
Mark Martin (seen in 1998), the IROC XX champion

IROC XX was the twentieth season of IROC competition, which started on February 16, 1996. It was the first year that the Pontiac Firebird Trans Am was used in competition, and contested races at Daytona International Speedway, Talladega Superspeedway, Charlotte Motor Speedway, and Michigan International Speedway. Mark Martin won the first night race in the history of the series in race three at Charlotte Motor Speedway, and won again in the season finale at Michigan International Speedway to win $225,000 in a come-from-behind IROC championship, his second in three seasons.

The roster of drivers and final points standings were as follows:

| Position | Driver | Points | Winnings | Series |
|---|---|---|---|---|
| 1 | (United States) Mark Martin | 61 | $225,000 | NASCAR Winston Cup |
| 2 | (United States) Robby Gordon | 54 | $100,000 | Indy Car |
| 3 | (United States) Johnny Benson | 50 | $60,000 | NASCAR Busch Series |
| 4 | (United States) Terry Labonte | 48 | $50,000 | NASCAR Winston Cup |
| 5 | (United States) Al Unser Jr. | 48 | $45,000 | Indy Car |
| 6 | (United States) Sterling Marlin | 40 | $40,000 | NASCAR Winston Cup |
| 7 | (United States) Scott Pruett | 40 | $40,000 | Indy Car |
| 8 | (United States) Dale Earnhardt | 39 | $40,000 | NASCAR Winston Cup |
| 9 | (United States) Tommy Kendall | 36 | $40,000 | SCCA Trans-Am Series |
| 10 | (United States) Jeff Gordon | 30 | $40,000 | NASCAR Winston Cup |
| 11 | (United States) Rusty Wallace | 26 | $40,000 | NASCAR Winston Cup |
| 12 | (United States) Steve Kinser | 25 | $40,000 | World of Outlaws |

== Race results ==
=== Daytona International Speedway, Race One ===
1. Dale Earnhardt
2. Robby Gordon
3. Tommy Kendall
4. Sterling Marlin
5. Al Unser Jr.
6. Jeff Gordon
7. Terry Labonte
8. Mark Martin
9. Johnny Benson
10. Scott Pruett
11. Steve Kinser
12. Rusty Wallace

=== Talladega Superspeedway, Race Two ===
1. Al Unser Jr.
2. Robby Gordon
3. Scott Pruett
4. Sterling Marlin
5. Terry Labonte
6. Steve Kinser
7. Jeff Gordon
8. Tommy Kendall
9. Dale Earnhardt
10. Johnny Benson
11. Mark Martin
12. Rusty Wallace

=== Charlotte Motor Speedway, Race Three ===
1. Mark Martin
2. Johnny Benson
3. Scott Pruett
4. Rusty Wallace
5. Jeff Gordon
6. Terry Labonte
7. Tommy Kendall
8. Al Unser Jr.
9. Steve Kinser
10. Dale Earnhardt
11. Sterling Marlin
12. Robby Gordon

=== Michigan International Speedway, Race Four ===
1. Mark Martin
2. Johnny Benson
3. Terry Labonte
4. Robby Gordon
5. Al Unser Jr.
6. Sterling Marlin
7. Rusty Wallace
8. Scott Pruett
9. Dale Jarrett ^{1}
10. Ricky Rudd ^{2}
11. Geoff Bodine^{3}
12. Jeff Gordon

== Notes ==
1. Dale Jarrett drove for Steve Kinser
2. Ricky Rudd drove for Dale Earnhardt, who was injured in a Cup race at Talladega the week before.
3. Geoff Bodine drove for Tommy Kendall
