= Ben Leslie =

American auto mechanic

Ben Leslie is an American auto mechanic and former NASCAR crew chief. He is the younger brother of former Automobile Racing Club of America champion and NASCAR driver Tracy Leslie. As of 2025, Leslie works as an Application Engineer Specialist at AVL, an automotive engineering company, where he applies his motorsports experience to broader automotive projects

== NASCAR career ==
Leslie began his NASCAR career in 1994 as a mechanic and tire changer on Ted Musgrave's car for Roush Racing. He later held the same role on Mark Martin’s team. In 1998, he moved to the new No. 26 Ford team driven by Johnny Benson Jr., also at Roush. He initially served as car chief and was promoted to interim crew chief mid-season, securing two ninth-place finishes with Benson.

In 1999, Leslie spent the early part of the season with Benson before becoming the car chief for Matt Kenseth’s team. Kenseth went on to win NASCAR Rookie of the Year in 2000.

In 2001, Leslie became crew chief for the No. 97 team driven by rookie Kurt Busch. The team captured the pole at the Mountain Dew Southern 500 and secured five top-ten finishes. By the end of the season, Leslie returned to Mark Martin’s crew as chief. In 2002, Martin and Leslie won the Coca-Cola 600 and finished second in the overall championship standings, just 38 points behind the leader.

In 2003, Leslie became crew chief for the No. 21 Wood Brothers Racing Ford driven by Ricky Rudd. The team struggled that season, finishing only five races in the top ten and placing 23rd in overall points. In 2004, they earned one pole and two top-ten finishes before Leslie left to become Ford Racing’s field director.

Leslie returned to pit road as crew chief for the No. 28 Yates Racing Ford driven by Travis Kvapil. Although the team showed some promise with two top-twenty finishes, it folded after five races due to lack of sponsorship. Leslie then transitioned to Hall of Fame Racing—an affiliate of Yates—serving as crew chief for Bobby Labonte and later Erik Darnell.

In 2010, Leslie joined Roush Fenway Racing’s No. 6 team as crew chief for rookie Ricky Stenhouse Jr. His final known NASCAR role came in 2016, when he took over as crew chief for Cole Whitt at Premium Motorsports midway through the season.

== Post-NASCAR Career ==
After stepping away from NASCAR, Leslie shifted into the automotive engineering sector. As of 2025, he works at AVL as an Application Engineer Specialist, focusing on advanced vehicle technologies.
