= Hill Motorsports =

Former NASCAR Truck Series team

- Owner(s): Timmy Hill; Tyler Hill
- Base: Thomasville, North Carolina
- Series: NASCAR Truck Series
- Race drivers: 56. Timmy Hill (part-time)
- Manufacturer: Toyota
- Opened: 1991; 2019 (reopened)
- Closed: 2026

Career
- Debut: Cup Series: 1991 Peak Antifreeze 500 (Dover); Truck Series: 2001 Darlington 200 (Darlington); ARCA Menards Series: 2025 General Tire 150 (Dover); ARCA Menards Series East: 2025 Pensacola 150 (Pensacola)
- Latest race: Cup Series: 1994 Brickyard 400 (Indianapolis); Truck Series: 2026 Black's Tire 200 (Martinsville); ARCA Menards Series: 2025 Bush's Beans 200 (Bristol); ARCA Menards Series East: 2025 Bush's Beans 200 (Bristol)
- Races competed: Total: 164; Cup Series: 8 Truck Series: 150; ARCA Menards Series: 2 ARCA Menards Series East: 4
- Drivers' Championships: Total: 0 Cup Series: 0 Truck Series: 0 ARCA Menards Series: 0 ARCA Menards Series East: 0
- Race victories: Total: 0 Cup Series: 0 Truck Series: 0 ARCA Menards Series: 0 ARCA Menards Series East: 0
- Pole positions: Total: 0 Cup Series: 0 Truck Series: 0 ARCA Menards Series: 0 ARCA Menards Series East: 0

Hill Motorsports was an American professional stock car racing team competed in the NASCAR Truck Series. The team was owned by Timmy Hill and Tyler Hill and fielded the No. 56 Toyota Tundra part-time for Timmy Hill.

== Winston Cup Series ==
=== Car No. 56 history ===
Hill Motorsports made their Cup series debut in 1991, with Jerry Hill running the No. 56 Hill Motorsports Pontiac that he would drive throughout his Cup career. In his debut at Dover, Hill started and finished 38th after vibration problems, only completing 39 laps. In his second start at Rockingham, Hill managed to improve on qualifying, but finished 38th just the same after being flagged.

Hill would run four races for the team in 1992. He managed his best finish of the year of 27th at Rockingham, the only race he finished. He also improved on qualifying in 1992, earning a career best of 36th at Dover.

Hill ran two races in 1993, his last Cup starts. They both came at Rockingham, they were both 38th-place finishes and they were both DNFs. With the dismal results from 1993–1994, Hill left the Cup Series.

==== Car No. 56 results ====
Year	Driver	No.	Make	1	2	3	4	5	6	7	8	9	10	11	12	13	14	15	16	17	18	19	20	21	22	23	24	25	26	27	28	29	30	31	NWCC	Pts
1991	Jerry Hill	56	Pontiac	DAY	RCH	CAR	ATL	DAR	BRI	NWS	MAR	TAL	CLT	DOV	SON	POC	MCH	DAY	POC	TAL	GLN	MCH	BRI	DAR	RCH	DOV; 38	MAR	NWS	CLT	CAR; 38	PHO	ATL			72nd	98
1992	Jerry Hill	56	Pontiac	DAY	CAR; 27	RCH	ATL	DAR; 35	BRI	NWS	MAR	TAL	CLT	DOV; 38	SON	POC; 38	MCH	DAY	POC	TAL	GLN	MCH	BRI	DAR	RCH	DOV	MAR	NWS	CLT	CAR	PHO	ATL			51st	238
1993	Jerry Hill	56	Chevy	DAY	CAR; 38	RCH	ATL	DAR	BRI	NWS	MAR	TAL	SON	CLT	DOV; DNQ	POC	MCH	DAY	NHA	POC; DNQ	TAL	GLN	MCH	BRI	DAR; DNQ	RCH	DOV	MAR	NWS	CLT	CAR; 38	PHO	ATL		67th	98
1994	Jerry Hill	56	Chevy	DAY; DNQ	CAR; DNQ	RCH	ATL	DAR	BRI	NWS	MAR	TAL	SON	CLT	DOV	POC	MCH	DAY	NHA	POC	TAL	IND; DNQ	GLN	MCH	BRI	DAR	RCH	DOV	MAR	NWS	CLT	CAR	PHO	ATL	NA	-

== Craftsman Truck Series ==
=== Truck No. 5 history ===
In 2022, Hill Motorsports announced it would run the No. 5 truck on a part-time basis. Tyler Hill would fail to qualify at COTA and Richmond but qualified for his remaining attempts that year with a best finish of 21st at Kansas.

==== Truck No. 5 results ====
Year	Driver	No.	Make	1	2	3	4	5	6	7	8	9	10	11	12	13	14	15	16	17	18	19	20	21	22	23	NCWTC	Pts
2022	Tyler Hill	5	Toyota	DAY	LVS	ATL	COA; DNQ	MAR	BRD	DAR	KAN; 21	TEX; 25	CLT	GTW; 25	SON	KNX	NSH	MOH	POC; 30	IRP	RCH; DNQ	KAN; 29	BRI	TAL	HOM; 29	PHO; 23	41st	77

=== Truck No. 41 history ===
Hill Motorsports made its truck series debut in 2001 at Darlington with Jerry Hill as the driver of the No. 41 truck. He started 36th and finishing 26th. Hill finished 27th at Dover and then 17th at Kentucky.

==== Truck No. 41 results ====
Year	Driver	No.	Make	1	2	3	4	5	6	7	8	9	10	11	12	13	14	15	16	17	18	19	20	21	22	23	24	NGTC	Pts
2001	Jerry Hill	41	Ford	DAY	HOM	MMR	MAR	GTY	DAR; 26	PPR	DOV; 27	TEX	MEM	MLW	KAN	KEN; 17	NHA	IRP	NSH	CIC	NZH								
2001	Jimmy Burns	41	Ford																			RCH; DNQ	SBO	TEX	LVS	PHO	CAL		
2002	Jerry Hill	41	Dodge	DAY; DNQ	DAR	MAR	GTY	PPR	DOV	TEX	MEM	MLW	KAN	KEN	NHA	MCH	IRP	NSH	RCH	TEX	SBO	LVS	CAL	PHO	HOM				

=== Truck No. 47 history ===
In 2001, the team fielded the No. 47 truck for Jerry Hill at Auto Club. He finished 21st.

==== Truck No. 47 results ====
Year	Driver	No.	Make	1	2	3	4	5	6	7	8	9	10	11	12	13	14	15	16	17	18	19	20	21	22	23	24	NCTC	Pts
2001	Jerry Hill	47	Chevy	DAY	HOM	MMR	MAR	GTY	DAR	PPR	DOV	TEX	MEM	MLW	KAN	KEN	NHA	IRP	NSH	CIC	NZH	RCH	SBO	TEX	LVS	PHO	CAL; 21		

=== Truck No. 56 history ===
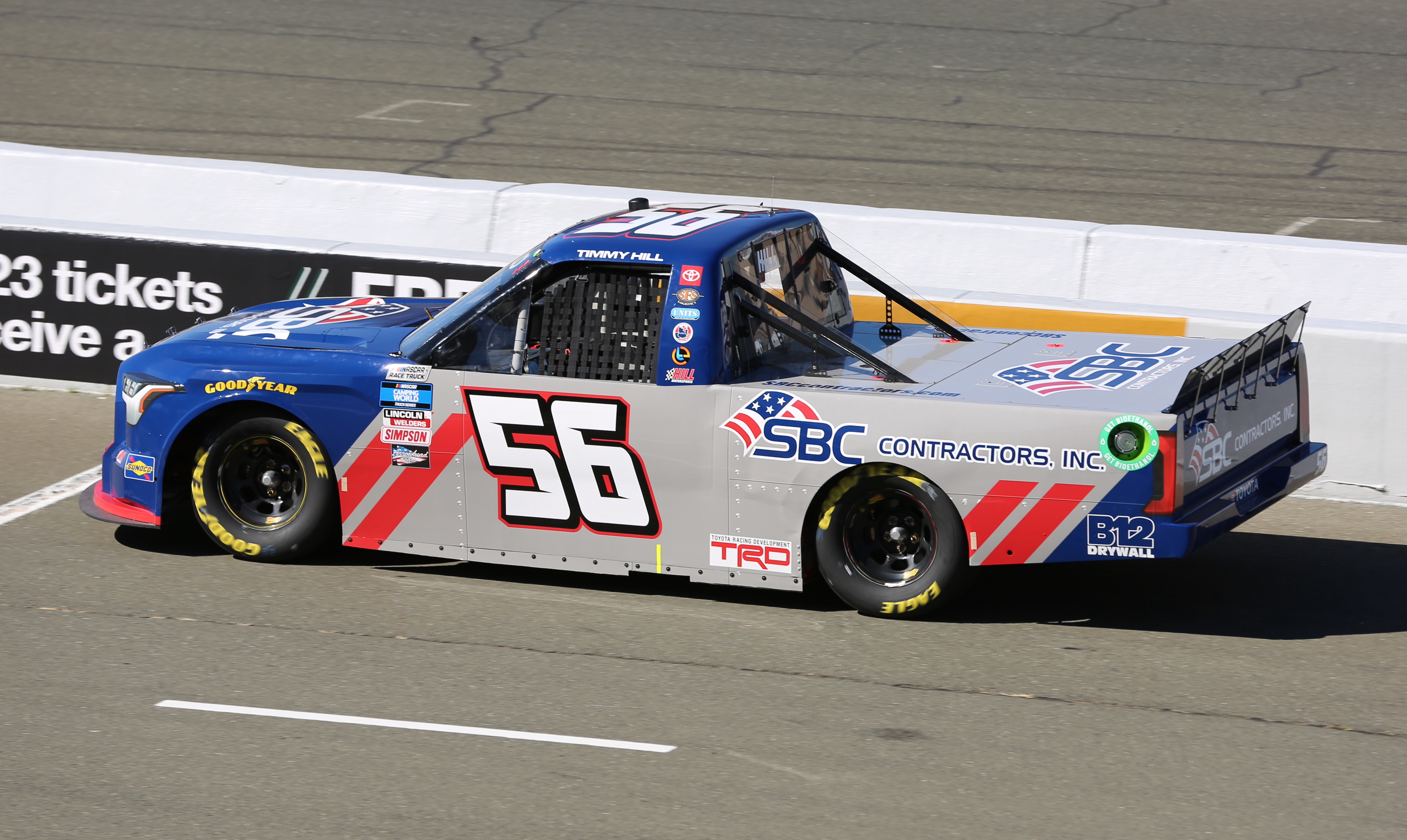
Timmy Hill in the No. 56 at Sonoma Raceway in 2022

Hill Motorsports made their Truck Series return at Martinsville in 2019 with Timmy Hill behind the wheel of the No. 56 truck. He finished 21st. Tyler Hill drove the truck at Dover and finished twentieth. Timmy Hill came back and finished sixteenth at Charlotte and 24th Chicagoland. Tyler Hill finished 26th at Iowa. The highlight of the season came at the Texas Roadhouse 200 in Martinsville, where Timmy Hill scored the team's first-ever top-five finish.

Bobby Reuse and Carson Hocevar both took part in races in the No. 56 truck. On both occasions, the truck was prepared by Jordan Anderson Racing, though the truck was still officially classified as a Hill Motorsports entry.

In 2020, Gus Dean joined the team for the season opener at Daytona International Speedway.

In 2021, Mike Marlar joined the team for the Pinty's Dirt Truck Race. Later on, Tyler Hill drove the No. 56 to a second place finish at Talladega, setting a new best finish for the team being defeated by Tate Fogleman.

In 2022, Timmy Hill would drive the No. 56 truck full-time.

For 2023, Hill Motorsports announced that both Timmy and Tyler Hill would split time behind the No. 56 truck with Timmy Hill driving the season opening race at Daytona.

For 2024, Timmy Hill has been announced as the full-time driver of the No. 56 truck.

From 2025–2026, the No. 56 was scaled back to part-time entry, with Timmy Hill as the driver.

On October 30, 2026, it was announced at the race at Martinsville would be Hill's final race, driving and owning the team.

==== Truck No. 56 results ====
Year	Driver	No.	Make	1	2	3	4	5	6	7	8	9	10	11	12	13	14	15	16	17	18	19	20	21	22	23	24	25	NCTC	Pts
2019	Timmy Hill	56	Chevy	DAY	ATL	LVS	MAR; 21	TEX			CLT; 16	TEX			CHI; 24					BRI; 17				MAR; 5					28th	199
2019	Tyler Hill	56	Chevy						DOV; 20	KAN			IOW; 26	GTW		KEN; 11	POC	ELD	MCH			LVS; DNQ	TAL			HOM; 23			28th	199
2019	Bobby Reuse (Note: Reuse and Hocevar drove entries fielded by Jordan Anderson Racing using Hill's owner points.)	56	Chevy																		MSP; 22								28th	199
2019	Carson Hocevar	56	Chevy																						PHO; 23				28th	199
2020	Gus Dean (Note: Dean's entries were co-fielded by Win-Tron Racing using Hill's owner points.)	56	Chevy	DAY; 26																		TAL; 30							20th	403
2020	Timmy Hill	56	Chevy		LVS; 28	CLT; 22	ATL; 22				TEX; 18	KAN; 19				DOV; 21		DAR; 9	RCH; 9	BRI; 20					MAR; 14				20th	403
2020	Tyler Hill	56	Chevy					HOM; 25	POC; 19	KEN; 30			KAN; 16	MCH; 21	DAY; 16		GTW; 21				LVS; 17		KAN; 14	TEX; 11		PHO; 25			20th	403
2021	Gus Dean	56	Chevy	DAY; 34																									23rd	330
2021	Timmy Hill	56	Chevy		DAY; 9				RCH; 21	KAN; 22	DAR; 7	COA; 24	CLT; 18		NSH; 29			GLN; 24			BRI; 17			MAR; 10					23rd	330
2021	Tyler Hill	56	Chevy			LVS; 35	ATL							TEX; 19		POC; 24	KNX		GTW; 11	DAR; 32		LVS; 17			PHO; 33				23rd	330
2021	Tyler Hill	56	Toyota																				TAL; 2						23rd	330
2021	Mike Marlar	56	Toyota					BRI; 28																					23rd	330
2022	Timmy Hill	56	Toyota	DAY; 14	LVS; 18	ATL; 22	COA; 22	MAR; 23	BRI; 23	DAR; 16	KAN; 27	TEX; 20	CLT; 21	GTW; 17	SON; 28	KNX; 19	NSH; 23	MOH; 17	POC; 28	IRP; 17	RCH; 31	KAN; 19	BRI; 26	TAL; 15	HOM; 20	PHO; 27			21st	368
2023	Timmy Hill	56	Toyota	DAY; 16	LVS; 22	ATL; 8	COA; 25		BRD; 25	MAR; 19		DAR; 24	NWS; 31		GTW; 18	NSH; 16	MOH; 21		RCH; 23			KAN; 24	BRI; 26						25th	324
2023	Tyler Hill	56	Toyota					TEX; Wth			KAN; 22			CLT; 24				POC; 21		IRP; 26	MLW; 29			TAL; 30	HOM; 22	PHO; 20			25th	324
2024	Timmy Hill	56	Toyota	DAY; 8	ATL; 18	LVS; 32	BRI; 24	COA; 17	MAR; 20	TEX; 21	KAN; 22	DAR; 13	NWS; 26	CLT; 22	GTW; 18	NSH; 27	POC; 23	IRP; 19	RCH; 19	MLW; 25	BRI; 22	KAN; 23	TAL; DNQ	HOM; 23	MAR; 21	PHO; 22			25th	349
2025	Timmy Hill	56	Toyota	DAY; 11	ATL	LVS	HOM	MAR	BRI	CAR; 21	TEX	KAN	NWS	CLT; 19	NSH	MCH	POC	LRP; 25	IRP	GLN; 20	RCH	DAR; 8	BRI	NHA	ROV; 16	TAL	MAR; 16	PHO	32nd	160
2026	Timmy Hill	56	Toyota	DAY; DNQ	ATL	STP; 32	DAR; 14	ROC; 30	BRI; 33	TEX	GLN; 27	DOV	CLT; 18	NSH	MCH	COR; Wth	LRP	NWS; DNQ	IRP; 19	RCH; 33	NHA; 29	BRI; 22	KAN	CLT; 32	PHO	TAL; 16	MAR; 31	HOM	37th	145

== ARCA Menards Series ==
=== Car No. 56 history ===
On February 18, 2025, it was announced that Timmy Hill would compete part-time in the ARCA Menards Series driving the No. 56 Toyota Camry.

==== Car No. 56 results ====
Year	Team	No.	Make	1	2	3	4	5	6	7	8	9	10	11	12	13	14	15	16	17	18	19	20	Owners	Pts
2025	Timmy Hill	56	Toyota	DAY	PHO	TAL	KAN	CLT	MCH	BER	ELK	LRP	DOV; 6	IRP	IOW	GLN	ISF	MAD	DQN	BRI; 19	SLM	KAN	TOL	48th	63

== ARCA Menards Series East ==
=== Car No. 56 history ===
On February 18, 2025, it was announced that Timmy Hill would compete full-time in the ARCA Menards Series East driving the No. 56 Toyota Camry. After a crash at Rockingham, Hill skipped the next two events at Nashville Fairgrounds and Flat Rock. He returned at Dover International Speedway with sixth place finish.

==== Car No. 56 results ====
Year	Driver	No.	Make	1	2	3	4	5	6	7	8	Owners	Pts
2025	Timmy Hill	56	Toyota	FIF; 7	CAR; 20	NSH	FRS	DOV; 6	IRP	IOW	BRI; 19	27th	124
