= 1991 AC Delco 500 =

27th race of the 1991 NASCAR Winston Cup Series

Race details
- Race 27 of 29 in the 1991 NASCAR Winston Cup Series
- The 1991 AC Delco 500 program cover, featuring Dale Earnhardt.
- Date: October 20, 1991
- Official name: 27th Annual AC Delco 500
- Location: Rockingham, North Carolina, North Carolina Motor Speedway
- Course: Permanent racing facility
- Course length: 1.017 miles (1.636 km)
- Distance: 492 laps, 500.364 mi (805.257 km)
- Scheduled distance: 492 laps, 500.364 mi (805.257 km)
- Average speed: 127.292 miles per hour (204.857 km/h)
- Attendance: 57,700

Pole position
Driver	Kyle Petty	SABCO Racing
- Time: 24.496

Most laps led
Driver	Harry Gant	Leo Jackson Motorsports
- Laps: 258

Winner
No. 28	Davey Allison	Robert Yates Racing

Television in the United States
- Network: TNN
- Announcers: Mike Joy, Buddy Baker, Neil Bonnett

Radio in the United States
- Radio: Motor Racing Network

The 1991 AC Delco 500 was the 27th stock car race of the 1991 NASCAR Winston Cup Series and the 27th iteration of the event. The race was held on Sunday, October 20, 1991, before an audience of 57,700 in Rockingham, North Carolina, at North Carolina Speedway, a 1.017 miles (1.637 km) permanent high-banked racetrack. The race took the scheduled 492 laps to complete. In the final laps of the race, Leo Jackson Motorsports driver Harry Gant would suffer a faulty final pit-stop on lap 452, leading towards Robert Yates Racing driver Davey Allison to take the lead for the final 17 laps of the race. The victory was Allison's 12th career NASCAR Winston Cup Series victory and his fourth victory of the season. To fill out the top three, the aforementioned Harry Gant and Roush Racing driver Mark Martin would finish second and third, respectively.

With a 19-point increase over competitor Ricky Rudd in the driver's championship standings, Dale Earnhardt was considered the heavy favorite to win the championship, having a 157-point lead over Rudd.

== Background ==
The layout of North Carolina Speedway, the venue where the race was held.

North Carolina Speedway was opened as a flat, one-mile oval on October 31, 1965. In 1969, the track was extensively reconfigured to a high-banked, D-shaped oval just over one mile in length. In 1997, North Carolina Motor Speedway merged with Penske Motorsports, and was renamed North Carolina Speedway. Shortly thereafter, the infield was reconfigured, and competition on the infield road course, mostly by the SCCA, was discontinued. Currently, the track is home to the Fast Track High Performance Driving School.

=== Entry list ===
- (R) denotes rookie driver.

#	Driver	Team	Make
1	Rick Mast	Precision Products Racing	Oldsmobile
2	Rusty Wallace	Penske Racing South	Pontiac
3	Dale Earnhardt	Richard Childress Racing	Chevrolet
4	Ernie Irvan	Morgan–McClure Motorsports	Chevrolet
5	Ricky Rudd	Hendrick Motorsports	Chevrolet
6	Mark Martin	Roush Racing	Ford
7	Alan Kulwicki	AK Racing	Ford
8	Rick Wilson	Stavola Brothers Racing	Buick
9	Bill Elliott	Melling Racing	Ford
10	Derrike Cope	Whitcomb Racing	Chevrolet
11	Geoff Bodine	Junior Johnson & Associates	Ford
12	Hut Stricklin	Bobby Allison Motorsports	Buick
15	Morgan Shepherd	Bud Moore Engineering	Ford
17	Darrell Waltrip	Darrell Waltrip Motorsports	Chevrolet
19	Chad Little	Little Racing	Ford
20	Ricky Craven	Moroso Racing	Oldsmobile
21	Dale Jarrett	Wood Brothers Racing	Ford
22	Sterling Marlin	Junior Johnson & Associates	Ford
24	Jimmy Hensley	Team III Racing	Pontiac
25	Ken Schrader	Hendrick Motorsports	Chevrolet
26	Brett Bodine	King Racing	Buick
28	Davey Allison	Robert Yates Racing	Ford
30	Michael Waltrip	Bahari Racing	Pontiac
33	Harry Gant	Leo Jackson Motorsports	Oldsmobile
35	Keith Van Houten	Van Houten Racing	Pontiac
42	Kyle Petty	SABCO Racing	Pontiac
43	Richard Petty	Petty Enterprises	Pontiac
47	Greg Sacks	Close Racing	Oldsmobile
48	James Hylton	Hylton Motorsports	Buick
52	Jimmy Means	Jimmy Means Racing	Pontiac
55	Ted Musgrave (R)	U.S. Racing	Pontiac
56	Jerry Hill	Hill Motorsports	Pontiac
66	Randy LaJoie	Cale Yarborough Motorsports	Pontiac
68	Bobby Hamilton (R)	TriStar Motorsports	Oldsmobile
71	Dave Marcis	Marcis Auto Racing	Chevrolet
75	Joe Ruttman	RahMoc Enterprises	Oldsmobile
77	Gary Brooks	Brooks Racing	Oldsmobile
82	Mark Stahl	Stahl Racing	Ford
94	Terry Labonte	Hagan Racing	Oldsmobile
98	Jimmy Spencer	Travis Carter Enterprises	Chevrolet

== Qualifying ==
Qualifying was split into two rounds. The first round was held on Thursday, October 17, at 2:30 PM EST. Each driver would have one lap to set a time. During the first round, the top 20 drivers in the round would be guaranteed a starting spot in the race. If a driver was not able to guarantee a spot in the first round, they had the option to scrub their time from the first round and try and run a faster lap time in a second round qualifying run, held on Friday, October 18, at 2:00 PM EST. As with the first round, each driver would have one lap to set a time. For this specific race, positions 21-40 would be decided on time, and depending on who needed it, a select amount of positions were given to cars who had not otherwise qualified but were high enough in owner's points; up to two were given. If needed, a past champion who did not qualify on either time or provisionals could use a champion's provisional, adding one more spot to the field.

Kyle Petty, driving for SABCO Racing, won the pole, setting a time of 24.496 and an average speed of 149.461 mph (240.534 km/h) in the first round.

No drivers would fail to qualify.

=== Full qualifying results ===
Pos.	#	Driver	Team	Make	Time	Speed
1	42	Kyle Petty	SABCO Racing	Pontiac	24.496	149.461
2	4	Ernie Irvan	Morgan–McClure Motorsports	Chevrolet	24.604	148.805
3	6	Mark Martin	Roush Racing	Ford	24.757	147.885
4	3	Dale Earnhardt	Richard Childress Racing	Chevrolet	24.768	147.820
5	5	Ricky Rudd	Hendrick Motorsports	Chevrolet	24.893	147.077
6	25	Ken Schrader	Hendrick Motorsports	Chevrolet	24.899	147.042
7	71	Dave Marcis	Marcis Auto Racing	Chevrolet	24.930	146.859
8	21	Dale Jarrett	Wood Brothers Racing	Ford	24.961	146.677
9	2	Rusty Wallace	Penske Racing South	Pontiac	24.963	146.665
10	28	Davey Allison	Robert Yates Racing	Ford	24.972	146.612
11	11	Geoff Bodine	Junior Johnson & Associates	Ford	24.991	146.501
12	9	Bill Elliott	Melling Racing	Ford	25.003	146.430
13	33	Harry Gant	Leo Jackson Motorsports	Oldsmobile	25.012	146.378
14	47	Greg Sacks	Close Racing	Oldsmobile	25.015	146.360
15	10	Derrike Cope	Whitcomb Racing	Chevrolet	25.038	146.226
16	7	Alan Kulwicki	AK Racing	Ford	25.055	146.127
17	17	Darrell Waltrip	Darrell Waltrip Motorsports	Chevrolet	25.058	146.109
18	30	Michael Waltrip	Bahari Racing	Pontiac	25.091	145.917
19	15	Morgan Shepherd	Bud Moore Engineering	Ford	25.109	145.812
20	26	Brett Bodine	King Racing	Buick	25.114	145.783
Failed to lock in Round 1
21	68	Bobby Hamilton (R)	TriStar Motorsports	Oldsmobile	25.148	145.586
22	94	Terry Labonte	Hagan Racing	Oldsmobile	25.163	145.499
23	66	Randy LaJoie	Cale Yarborough Motorsports	Pontiac	25.178	145.413
24	22	Sterling Marlin	Junior Johnson & Associates	Ford	25.199	145.291
25	8	Rick Wilson	Stavola Brothers Racing	Buick	25.297	144.729
26	75	Joe Ruttman	RahMoc Enterprises	Chevrolet	25.300	144.711
27	1	Rick Mast	Precision Products Racing	Oldsmobile	25.315	144.626
28	98	Jimmy Spencer	Travis Carter Enterprises	Chevrolet	25.336	144.506
29	24	Jimmy Hensley	Team III Racing	Pontiac	25.351	144.420
30	12	Hut Stricklin	Bobby Allison Motorsports	Buick	25.356	144.392
31	43	Richard Petty	Petty Enterprises	Pontiac	25.413	144.068
32	55	Ted Musgrave (R)	U.S. Racing	Pontiac	25.414	144.062
33	19	Chad Little	Little Racing	Ford	25.694	142.492
34	20	Ricky Craven	Moroso Racing	Oldsmobile	25.905	141.332
35	52	Jimmy Means	Jimmy Means Racing	Pontiac	25.975	140.951
36	82	Mark Stahl	Stahl Racing	Ford	26.545	137.924
37	56	Jerry Hill	Hill Motorsports	Pontiac	27.630	132.508
38	48	James Hylton	Hylton Motorsports	Buick	27.852	131.452
39	35	Keith Van Houten	Van Houten Racing	Pontiac	28.339	129.193
40	77	Gary Brooks	Brooks Racing	Oldsmobile	30.092	121.667
Official first round qualifying results
Official starting lineup

== Race results ==
Fin	St	#	Driver	Team	Make	Laps	Led	Status	Pts	Winnings
1	10	28	Davey Allison	Robert Yates Racing	Ford	492	100	running	180	$66,050
2	13	33	Harry Gant	Leo Jackson Motorsports	Oldsmobile	492	258	running	180	$34,675
3	3	6	Mark Martin	Roush Racing	Ford	492	28	running	170	$29,350
4	11	11	Geoff Bodine	Junior Johnson & Associates	Ford	492	27	running	165	$26,450
5	6	25	Ken Schrader	Hendrick Motorsports	Chevrolet	491	15	running	160	$17,325
6	21	68	Bobby Hamilton (R)	TriStar Motorsports	Oldsmobile	490	0	running	150	$11,650
7	4	3	Dale Earnhardt	Richard Childress Racing	Chevrolet	490	0	running	146	$19,250
8	24	22	Sterling Marlin	Junior Johnson & Associates	Ford	490	0	running	142	$10,000
9	1	42	Kyle Petty	SABCO Racing	Pontiac	490	64	running	143	$22,950
10	12	9	Bill Elliott	Melling Racing	Ford	490	0	running	134	$18,500
11	9	2	Rusty Wallace	Penske Racing South	Pontiac	489	0	running	130	$9,000
12	5	5	Ricky Rudd	Hendrick Motorsports	Chevrolet	489	0	running	127	$13,800
13	30	12	Hut Stricklin	Bobby Allison Motorsports	Buick	486	0	running	124	$11,000
14	29	24	Jimmy Hensley	Team III Racing	Pontiac	486	0	running	121	$8,700
15	15	10	Derrike Cope	Whitcomb Racing	Chevrolet	485	0	running	118	$15,050
16	31	43	Richard Petty	Petty Enterprises	Pontiac	485	0	running	115	$9,700
17	19	15	Morgan Shepherd	Bud Moore Engineering	Ford	485	0	running	112	$22,400
18	27	1	Rick Mast	Precision Products Racing	Oldsmobile	485	0	running	109	$8,900
19	18	30	Michael Waltrip	Bahari Racing	Pontiac	484	0	running	106	$11,000
20	25	8	Rick Wilson	Stavola Brothers Racing	Buick	484	0	running	103	$9,200
21	32	55	Ted Musgrave (R)	U.S. Racing	Pontiac	483	0	running	100	$6,100
22	28	98	Jimmy Spencer	Travis Carter Enterprises	Chevrolet	482	0	running	97	$7,650
23	33	19	Chad Little	Little Racing	Ford	481	0	running	94	$6,025
24	23	66	Randy LaJoie	Cale Yarborough Motorsports	Pontiac	479	0	running	91	$7,300
25	8	21	Dale Jarrett	Wood Brothers Racing	Ford	479	0	running	88	$7,275
26	7	71	Dave Marcis	Marcis Auto Racing	Chevrolet	479	0	running	85	$7,050
27	26	75	Joe Ruttman	RahMoc Enterprises	Chevrolet	473	0	running	82	$6,925
28	22	94	Terry Labonte	Hagan Racing	Oldsmobile	471	0	running	79	$6,850
29	14	47	Greg Sacks	Close Racing	Oldsmobile	470	0	running	76	$4,200
30	20	26	Brett Bodine	King Racing	Buick	401	0	engine	73	$9,250
31	2	4	Ernie Irvan	Morgan–McClure Motorsports	Chevrolet	365	0	accident	70	$12,700
32	17	17	Darrell Waltrip	Darrell Waltrip Motorsports	Chevrolet	362	0	engine	67	$3,900
33	16	7	Alan Kulwicki	AK Racing	Ford	318	0	engine	64	$10,750
34	34	20	Ricky Craven	Moroso Racing	Oldsmobile	221	0	engine	61	$3,750
35	35	52	Jimmy Means	Jimmy Means Racing	Pontiac	203	0	ignition	58	$3,600
36	36	82	Mark Stahl	Stahl Racing	Ford	16	0	handling	55	$3,525
37	39	35	Keith Van Houten	Van Houten Racing	Pontiac	13	0	handling	0	$3,475
38	37	56	Jerry Hill	Hill Motorsports	Pontiac	13	0	handling	49	$3,475
39	40	77	Gary Brooks	Brooks Racing	Oldsmobile	11	0	handling	46	$3,425
40	38	48	James Hylton	Hylton Motorsports	Buick	7	0	engine	43	$3,400
Official race results

== Standings after the race ==
Drivers' Championship standings

	Pos	Driver	Points
	1	Dale Earnhardt	3,989
	2	Ricky Rudd	3,832 (-157)
	3	Davey Allison	3,786 (-203)
	4	Harry Gant	3,726 (–263)
1	5	Mark Martin	3,618 (–371)
1	6	Ernie Irvan	3,595 (–394)
1	7	Ken Schrader	3,526 (–463)
1	8	Sterling Marlin	3,526 (–466)
	9	Darrell Waltrip	3,397 (–592)
	10	Rusty Wallace	3,366 (–623)
Official driver's standings

- Note: Only the first 10 positions are included for the driver standings.

Previous race: 1991 Mello Yello 500	NASCAR Winston Cup Series; 1991 season	Next race: 1991 Pyroil 500
