= 1992 Champion Spark Plug 500 =

13th race of the 1992 NASCAR Winston Cup Series

Race details
- Race 13 of 29 in the 1992 NASCAR Winston Cup Series
- The 1992 Champion Spark Plug 500 program cover, featuring Richard Petty. Artwork by NASCAR artist Sam Bass.
- Date: June 14, 1992
- Official name: 11th Annual Champion Spark Plug 500
- Location: Long Pond, Pennsylvania, Pocono Raceway
- Course: Permanent racing facility
- Course length: 2.5 miles (4.0 km)
- Distance: 200 laps, 500 mi (804.672 km)
- Scheduled distance: 200 laps, 500 mi (804.672 km)
- Average speed: 144.023 miles per hour (231.783 km/h)
- Attendance: 100,000

Pole position
Driver	Ken Schrader	Hendrick Motorsports
- Time: 55.499

Most laps led
Driver	Alan Kulwicki	AK Racing
- Laps: 58

Winner
No. 7	Alan Kulwicki	AK Racing

Television in the United States
- Network: ESPN
- Announcers: Bob Jenkins, Ned Jarrett, Benny Parsons

Radio in the United States
- Radio: Motor Racing Network

The 1992 Champion Spark Plug 500 was the 13th stock car race of the 1992 NASCAR Winston Cup Series season and the 11th iteration of the event. The race was held on Sunday, June 13, 1992, before an audience of 100,000 in Long Pond, Pennsylvania, at Pocono Raceway, a 2.5 miles (4.0 km) triangular permanent course. The race took the scheduled 200 laps to complete. In the final laps of the race, owner-driver Alan Kulwicki would manage to make a late-race pass for the lead with 11 to go to take his fifth and final career NASCAR Winston Cup Series victory, his second and final victory of the season, and enough points to move him into third in the driver's championship standings, 58 points behind the leader. To fill out the top three, Roush Racing driver Mark Martin and Junior Johnson & Associates driver Bill Elliott would finish second and third, respectively.

== Background ==
The layout of Pocono International Raceway, the venue where the race was held.

The race was held at Pocono International Raceway, which is a three-turn superspeedway located in Long Pond, Pennsylvania. The track hosts two annual NASCAR Sprint Cup Series races, as well as one Xfinity Series and Camping World Truck Series event. Until 2019, the track also hosted an IndyCar Series race.

Pocono International Raceway is one of a very few NASCAR tracks not owned by either Speedway Motorsports, Inc. or International Speedway Corporation. It is operated by the Igdalsky siblings Brandon, Nicholas, and sister Ashley, and cousins Joseph IV and Chase Mattioli, all of whom are third-generation members of the family-owned Mattco Inc, started by Joseph II and Rose Mattioli.

Outside of the NASCAR races, the track is used throughout the year by Sports Car Club of America (SCCA) and motorcycle clubs as well as racing schools and an IndyCar race. The triangular oval also has three separate infield sections of racetrack – North Course, East Course and South Course. Each of these infield sections use a separate portion of the tri-oval to complete the track. During regular non-race weekends, multiple clubs can use the track by running on different infield sections. Also some of the infield sections can be run in either direction, or multiple infield sections can be put together – such as running the North Course and the South Course and using the tri-oval to connect the two.

=== Entry list ===
- (R) denotes rookie driver.

#	Driver	Team	Make	Sponsor
1	Rick Mast	Precision Products Racing	Oldsmobile	Skoal
2	Rusty Wallace	Penske Racing South	Pontiac	Miller Genuine Draft
3	Dale Earnhardt	Richard Childress Racing	Chevrolet	GM Goodwrench Service Plus
4	Ernie Irvan	Morgan–McClure Motorsports	Chevrolet	Kodak
5	Ricky Rudd	Hendrick Motorsports	Chevrolet	Tide
6	Mark Martin	Roush Racing	Ford	Valvoline
7	Alan Kulwicki	AK Racing	Ford	Hooters
8	Dick Trickle	Stavola Brothers Racing	Ford	Snickers
9	Chad Little	Melling Racing	Ford	Melling Racing
10	Derrike Cope	Whitcomb Racing	Chevrolet	Purolator Filters
11	Bill Elliott	Junior Johnson & Associates	Ford	Budweiser
12	Hut Stricklin	Bobby Allison Motorsports	Chevrolet	Raybestos
15	Geoff Bodine	Bud Moore Engineering	Ford	Motorcraft
16	Wally Dallenbach Jr.	Roush Racing	Ford	Keystone
17	Darrell Waltrip	Darrell Waltrip Motorsports	Chevrolet	Western Auto
18	Dale Jarrett	Joe Gibbs Racing	Chevrolet	Interstate Batteries
21	Morgan Shepherd	Wood Brothers Racing	Ford	Citgo
22	Sterling Marlin	Junior Johnson & Associates	Ford	Maxwell House
25	Ken Schrader	Hendrick Motorsports	Chevrolet	Kodiak
26	Brett Bodine	King Racing	Ford	Quaker State
28	Davey Allison	Robert Yates Racing	Ford	Texaco, Havoline
30	Michael Waltrip	Bahari Racing	Pontiac	Pennzoil
32	Jimmy Horton	Active Motorsports	Chevrolet	Active Trucking
33	Harry Gant	Leo Jackson Motorsports	Oldsmobile	Skoal Bandit
41	Greg Sacks	Larry Hedrick Motorsports	Chevrolet	Kellogg's Frosted Flakes
42	Kyle Petty	SABCO Racing	Pontiac	Mello Yello
43	Richard Petty	Petty Enterprises	Pontiac	STP
48	James Hylton	Hylton Motorsports	Pontiac	Valtrol Steam Traps
52	Jimmy Means	Jimmy Means Racing	Pontiac	Jimmy Means Racing
55	Ted Musgrave	RaDiUs Motorsports	Oldsmobile	Jasper Engines & Transmissions
56	Jerry Hill	Hill Motorsports	Pontiac	Bell Motors
59	Andy Belmont (R)	Pat Rissi Racing	Ford	FDP Brakes
62	Mark Thompson	Gray Racing	Ford	Phoenix Air
65	Jerry O'Neil	Aroneck Racing	Oldsmobile	Aroneck Racing
66	Jimmy Hensley (R)	Cale Yarborough Motorsports	Ford	Phillips 66 TropArtic
68	Bobby Hamilton	TriStar Motorsports	Oldsmobile	Country Time
71	Dave Marcis	Marcis Auto Racing	Chevrolet	Big Apple Market
77	Mike Potter	Balough Racing	Chevrolet	Kenova Golf Course Construction
85	Bobby Gerhart	Bobby Gerhart Racing	Chevrolet	Thomas Chevrolet
94	Terry Labonte	Hagan Racing	Ford	Sunoco

== Qualifying ==
Qualifying was split into two rounds. The first round was held on Friday, June 12, at 3:00 PM EST. Each driver would have one lap to set a time. During the first round, the top 15 drivers in the round would be guaranteed a starting spot in the race. If a driver was not able to guarantee a spot in the first round, they had the option to scrub their time from the first round and try and run a faster lap time in a second round qualifying run, held on Saturday, June 13, at 10:30 AM EST. As with the first round, each driver would have one lap to set a time. For this specific race, positions 16-40 would be decided on time, and depending on who needed it, a select amount of positions were given to cars who had not otherwise qualified but were high enough in owner's points; up to two provisionals were given. If needed, a past champion who did not qualify on either time or provisionals could use a champion's provisional, adding one more spot to the field.

Ken Schrader, driving for Hendrick Motorsports, would win the pole, setting a time of 55.499 and an average speed of 162.165 miles per hour (260.979 km/h) in the first round.

No drivers would fail to qualify.

=== Full qualifying results ===
Pos.	#	Driver	Team	Make	Time	Speed
1	25	Ken Schrader	Hendrick Motorsports	Chevrolet	55.499	162.165
2	21	Morgan Shepherd	Wood Brothers Racing	Ford	55.686	161.621
3	11	Bill Elliott	Junior Johnson & Associates	Ford	55.720	161.522
4	6	Mark Martin	Roush Racing	Ford	55.748	161.441
5	42	Kyle Petty	SABCO Racing	Pontiac	55.812	161.256
6	7	Alan Kulwicki	AK Racing	Ford	55.939	160.890
7	18	Dale Jarrett	Joe Gibbs Racing	Chevrolet	55.939	160.890
8	26	Brett Bodine	King Racing	Ford	55.992	160.737
9	5	Ricky Rudd	Hendrick Motorsports	Chevrolet	56.241	160.026
10	2	Rusty Wallace	Penske Racing South	Pontiac	56.245	160.014
11	12	Hut Stricklin	Bobby Allison Motorsports	Chevrolet	56.270	159.943
12	94	Terry Labonte	Hagan Racing	Oldsmobile	56.281	159.912
13	16	Wally Dallenbach Jr.	Roush Racing	Ford	56.334	159.761
14	10	Derrike Cope	Whitcomb Racing	Chevrolet	56.373	159.651
15	30	Michael Waltrip	Bahari Racing	Pontiac	56.402	159.569
Failed to lock in Round 1
16	4	Ernie Irvan	Morgan–McClure Motorsports	Chevrolet	55.756	161.418
17	3	Dale Earnhardt	Richard Childress Racing	Chevrolet	56.152	160.279
18	28	Davey Allison	Robert Yates Racing	Ford	56.204	160.131
19	22	Sterling Marlin	Junior Johnson & Associates	Ford	56.294	159.875
20	8	Dick Trickle	Stavola Brothers Racing	Ford	56.428	159.495
21	43	Richard Petty	Petty Enterprises	Pontiac	56.432	159.484
22	55	Ted Musgrave	RaDiUs Motorsports	Ford	56.436	159.473
23	66	Jimmy Hensley (R)	Cale Yarborough Motorsports	Ford	56.487	159.329
24	17	Darrell Waltrip	Darrell Waltrip Motorsports	Chevrolet	56.535	159.193
25	9	Chad Little	Melling Racing	Ford	56.600	159.011
26	41	Greg Sacks	Larry Hedrick Motorsports	Chevrolet	56.781	158.504
27	15	Geoff Bodine	Bud Moore Engineering	Ford	56.792	158.473
28	33	Harry Gant	Leo Jackson Motorsports	Oldsmobile	56.903	158.164
29	68	Bobby Hamilton	TriStar Motorsports	Oldsmobile	56.972	157.972
30	1	Rick Mast	Precision Products Racing	Oldsmobile	57.213	157.307
31	77	Mike Potter	Balough Racing	Chevrolet	58.139	154.801
32	71	Dave Marcis	Marcis Auto Racing	Chevrolet	58.265	154.467
33	52	Jimmy Means	Jimmy Means Racing	Pontiac	58.505	153.833
34	32	Jimmy Horton	Active Motorsports	Chevrolet	58.692	153.343
35	65	Jerry O'Neil	Aroneck Racing	Oldsmobile	59.016	152.501
36	59	Andy Belmont (R)	Pat Rissi Racing	Ford	59.199	152.030
37	85	Bobby Gerhart	Bobby Gerhart Racing	Chevrolet	59.283	151.814
38	62	Mark Thompson	Gray Racing	Ford	1:00.092	149.770
39	48	James Hylton	Hylton Motorsports	Pontiac	1:01.497	146.349
40	56	Jerry Hill	Hill Motorsports	Pontiac	1:03.939	140.759
Official first round qualifying results
Official starting lineup

== Race results ==
Fin	St	#	Driver	Team	Make	Laps	Led	Status	Pts	Winnings
1	6	7	Alan Kulwicki	AK Racing	Ford	200	58	running	185	$74,255
2	4	6	Mark Martin	Roush Racing	Ford	200	51	running	175	$39,480
3	3	11	Bill Elliott	Junior Johnson & Associates	Ford	200	12	running	170	$32,355
4	1	25	Ken Schrader	Hendrick Motorsports	Chevrolet	200	15	running	165	$32,980
5	18	28	Davey Allison	Robert Yates Racing	Ford	200	34	running	160	$27,175
6	5	42	Kyle Petty	SABCO Racing	Pontiac	200	0	running	150	$18,150
7	19	22	Sterling Marlin	Junior Johnson & Associates	Ford	200	0	running	146	$15,750
8	8	26	Brett Bodine	King Racing	Ford	200	1	running	147	$14,650
9	23	66	Jimmy Hensley (R)	Cale Yarborough Motorsports	Ford	200	5	running	143	$11,800
10	12	94	Terry Labonte	Hagan Racing	Oldsmobile	200	0	running	134	$15,600
11	26	41	Greg Sacks	Larry Hedrick Motorsports	Chevrolet	199	0	running	130	$10,000
12	14	10	Derrike Cope	Whitcomb Racing	Chevrolet	199	0	running	127	$9,650
13	24	17	Darrell Waltrip	Darrell Waltrip Motorsports	Chevrolet	199	1	running	129	$16,150
14	27	15	Geoff Bodine	Bud Moore Engineering	Ford	199	0	running	121	$12,050
15	15	30	Michael Waltrip	Bahari Racing	Pontiac	199	0	running	118	$11,550
16	21	43	Richard Petty	Petty Enterprises	Pontiac	198	0	running	115	$11,400
17	29	68	Bobby Hamilton	TriStar Motorsports	Oldsmobile	198	0	running	112	$12,050
18	32	71	Dave Marcis	Marcis Auto Racing	Chevrolet	196	0	running	109	$7,900
19	16	4	Ernie Irvan	Morgan–McClure Motorsports	Chevrolet	194	20	running	111	$16,000
20	31	77	Mike Potter	Balough Racing	Chevrolet	191	0	running	103	$6,475
21	35	65	Jerry O'Neil	Aroneck Racing	Oldsmobile	188	0	running	100	$5,750
22	7	18	Dale Jarrett	Joe Gibbs Racing	Chevrolet	187	0	running	97	$10,150
23	28	33	Harry Gant	Leo Jackson Motorsports	Oldsmobile	186	2	engine	99	$15,300
24	10	2	Rusty Wallace	Penske Racing South	Pontiac	185	1	running	96	$13,250
25	2	21	Morgan Shepherd	Wood Brothers Racing	Ford	180	0	running	88	$9,860
26	39	48	James Hylton	Hylton Motorsports	Pontiac	178	0	running	85	$5,150
27	13	16	Wally Dallenbach Jr.	Roush Racing	Ford	177	0	clutch	82	$5,100
28	17	3	Dale Earnhardt	Richard Childress Racing	Chevrolet	148	0	engine	79	$16,600
29	20	8	Dick Trickle	Stavola Brothers Racing	Ford	146	0	engine	76	$6,600
30	30	1	Rick Mast	Precision Products Racing	Oldsmobile	141	0	engine	73	$9,525
31	11	12	Hut Stricklin	Bobby Allison Motorsports	Chevrolet	116	0	engine	70	$9,450
32	37	85	Bobby Gerhart	Bobby Gerhart Racing	Chevrolet	113	0	engine	67	$4,850
33	22	55	Ted Musgrave	RaDiUs Motorsports	Ford	102	0	engine	64	$9,275
34	34	32	Jimmy Horton	Active Motorsports	Chevrolet	49	0	crash	61	$4,675
35	33	52	Jimmy Means	Jimmy Means Racing	Pontiac	33	0	head gasket	58	$7,100
36	9	5	Ricky Rudd	Hendrick Motorsports	Chevrolet	22	0	engine	55	$12,515
37	25	9	Chad Little	Melling Racing	Ford	15	0	piston	52	$4,445
38	40	56	Jerry Hill	Hill Motorsports	Pontiac	10	0	engine	49	$4,405
39	38	62	Mark Thompson	Gray Racing	Ford	8	0	engine	46	$4,370
40	36	59	Andy Belmont (R)	Pat Rissi Racing	Ford	3	0	engine	43	$4,295
Official race results

== Standings after the race ==
Drivers' Championship standings

	Pos	Driver	Points
	1	Davey Allison	1,933
1	2	Bill Elliott	1,912 (-21)
2	3	Alan Kulwicki	1,875 (-58)
	4	Harry Gant	1,840 (–93)
3	5	Dale Earnhardt	1,824 (–109)
	6	Terry Labonte	1,792 (–141)
4	7	Mark Martin	1,658 (–275)
1	8	Morgan Shepherd	1,636 (–297)
	9	Geoff Bodine	1,615 (–318)
	10	Ernie Irvan	1,599 (–334)
Official driver's standings

- Note: Only the first 10 positions are included for the driver standings.

Previous race: 1992 Save Mart 300K	NASCAR Winston Cup Series; 1992 season	Next race: 1992 Miller Genuine Draft 400 (Michigan)
