= 1992 Budweiser 500 =

11th race of the 1992 NASCAR Winston Cup Series

Race details
- Race 11 of 29 in the 1992 NASCAR Winston Cup Series
- The 1992 Budweiser 500 program cover, featuring Bill Elliott, Junior Johnson. and Tim Brewer.
- Date: May 31, 1992
- Official name: 24th Annual Budweiser 500
- Location: Dover, Delaware, Dover Downs International Speedway
- Course: Permanent racing facility
- Course length: 1 miles (1.6 km)
- Distance: 500 laps, 500 mi (804.672 km)
- Scheduled distance: 500 laps, 500 mi (804.672 km)
- Average speed: 109.456 miles per hour (176.152 km/h)
- Attendance: 77,000

Pole position
Driver	Brett Bodine	King Racing
- Time: 24.422

Most laps led
Driver	Darrell Waltrip	Darrell Waltrip Motorsports
- Laps: 104

Winner
No. 33	Harry Gant	Leo Jackson Motorsports

Television in the United States
- Network: TNN
- Announcers: Mike Joy, Buddy Baker, Neil Bonnett

Radio in the United States
- Radio: Motor Racing Network

The 1992 Budweiser 500 was the 11th stock car race of the 1992 NASCAR Winston Cup Series season and the 24th iteration of the event. The race was held on Sunday, May 31, 1992, before an audience of 77,000 in Dover, Delaware at Dover Downs International Speedway, a 1-mile (1.6 km) permanent oval-shaped racetrack. The race took the scheduled 500 laps to complete. Running on fumes, Leo Jackson Motorsports driver Harry Gant would manage to save enough fuel to coast to the finish to take his 17th career NASCAR Winston Cup Series victory and his first victory of the season. To fill out the top three, Richard Childress Racing driver Dale Earnhardt and Penske Racing South driver Rusty Wallace would finish second and third, respectively.

== Background ==
The layout of Dover Downs International Speedway, the venue where the race was held.

Dover Downs International Speedway is an oval race track in Dover, Delaware, United States that has held at least two NASCAR races since it opened in 1969. In addition to NASCAR, the track also hosted USAC and the NTT IndyCar Series. The track features one layout, a 1-mile (1.6 km) concrete oval, with 24° banking in the turns and 9° banking on the straights. The speedway is owned and operated by Dover Motorsports.

The track, nicknamed "The Monster Mile", was built in 1969 by Melvin Joseph of Melvin L. Joseph Construction Company, Inc., with an asphalt surface, but was replaced with concrete in 1995. Six years later in 2001, the track's capacity moved to 135,000 seats, making the track have the largest capacity of sports venue in the mid-Atlantic. In 2002, the name changed to Dover International Speedway from Dover Downs International Speedway after Dover Downs Gaming and Entertainment split, making Dover Motorsports. From 2007 to 2009, the speedway worked on an improvement project called "The Monster Makeover", which expanded facilities at the track and beautified the track. After the 2014 season, the track's capacity was reduced to 95,500 seats.

=== Entry list ===
- (R) denotes rookie driver.

#	Driver	Team	Make	Sponsor
1	Rick Mast	Precision Products Racing	Oldsmobile	Skoal
2	Rusty Wallace	Penske Racing South	Pontiac	Miller Genuine Draft
3	Dale Earnhardt	Richard Childress Racing	Chevrolet	GM Goodwrench Service Plus
4	Ernie Irvan	Morgan–McClure Motorsports	Chevrolet	Kodak
5	Ricky Rudd	Hendrick Motorsports	Chevrolet	Tide
6	Mark Martin	Roush Racing	Ford	Valvoline
7	Alan Kulwicki	AK Racing	Ford	Hooters
8	Dick Trickle	Stavola Brothers Racing	Ford	Snickers
9	Chad Little	Melling Racing	Ford	Melling Racing
10	Derrike Cope	Whitcomb Racing	Chevrolet	Purolator Filters
11	Bill Elliott	Junior Johnson & Associates	Ford	Budweiser
12	Hut Stricklin	Bobby Allison Motorsports	Chevrolet	Raybestos
15	Geoff Bodine	Bud Moore Engineering	Ford	Motorcraft
16	Wally Dallenbach Jr.	Roush Racing	Ford	Keystone
17	Darrell Waltrip	Darrell Waltrip Motorsports	Chevrolet	Western Auto
18	Dale Jarrett	Joe Gibbs Racing	Chevrolet	Interstate Batteries
21	Morgan Shepherd	Wood Brothers Racing	Ford	Citgo
22	Sterling Marlin	Junior Johnson & Associates	Ford	Maxwell House
25	Ken Schrader	Hendrick Motorsports	Chevrolet	Kodiak
26	Brett Bodine	King Racing	Ford	Quaker State
28	Davey Allison	Robert Yates Racing	Ford	Texaco, Havoline
30	Michael Waltrip	Bahari Racing	Pontiac	Pennzoil
32	Jimmy Horton	Active Motorsports	Chevrolet	Active Trucking
33	Harry Gant	Leo Jackson Motorsports	Oldsmobile	Skoal Bandit
41	Greg Sacks	Larry Hedrick Motorsports	Chevrolet	Kellogg's Frosted Flakes
42	Kyle Petty	SABCO Racing	Pontiac	Mello Yello
43	Richard Petty	Petty Enterprises	Pontiac	STP
48	James Hylton	Hylton Motorsports	Pontiac	Rumple Furniture
52	Jimmy Means	Jimmy Means Racing	Pontiac	Jimmy Means Racing
53	Graham Taylor	Jimmy Means Racing	Pontiac	Jimmy Means Racing
55	Ted Musgrave	RaDiUs Motorsports	Oldsmobile	Jasper Engines & Transmissions
56	Jerry Hill	Hill Motorsports	Pontiac	Bell Motors
59	Andy Belmont (R)	Pat Rissi Racing	Ford	FDP Brakes
65	Jerry O'Neil	Aroneck Racing	Oldsmobile	Aroneck Racing
66	Jimmy Hensley (R)	Cale Yarborough Motorsports	Ford	Phillips 66 TropArtic
68	Bobby Hamilton	TriStar Motorsports	Oldsmobile	Country Time
71	Dave Marcis	Marcis Auto Racing	Chevrolet	Maxx Race Cards
77	Mike Potter	Balough Racing	Chevrolet	Kenova Golf Course Construction
85	D. K. Ulrich	Aroneck Racing	Oldsmobile	Aroneck Racing
94	Terry Labonte	Hagan Racing	Ford	Sunoco

== Qualifying ==
Qualifying was originally scheduled to be split into two rounds. The first round was held on Friday, May 29, at 3:00 PM EST. Originally, the first 20 positions were going to be determined by first round qualifying, with positions 21-40 meant to be determined the following day on Saturday, May 30. However, due to rain, the second round was cancelled. As a result, the rest of the starting lineup was set using the results from the first round.

Brett Bodine, driving for King Racing, would win the pole, setting a time of 24.422 and an average speed of 147.408 miles per hour (237.230 km/h).

No drivers would fail to qualify.

=== Full qualifying results ===
Pos.	#	Driver	Team	Make	Time	Speed
1	26	Brett Bodine	King Racing	Ford	24.422	147.408
2	6	Mark Martin	Roush Racing	Ford	24.490	146.999
3	30	Michael Waltrip	Bahari Racing	Pontiac	24.498	146.951
4	17	Darrell Waltrip	Darrell Waltrip Motorsports	Chevrolet	24.565	146.550
5	15	Geoff Bodine	Bud Moore Engineering	Ford	24.584	146.437
6	25	Ken Schrader	Hendrick Motorsports	Chevrolet	24.589	146.407
7	21	Morgan Shepherd	Wood Brothers Racing	Ford	24.596	146.365
8	11	Bill Elliott	Junior Johnson & Associates	Ford	24.610	146.282
9	4	Ernie Irvan	Morgan–McClure Motorsports	Chevrolet	24.665	145.956
10	22	Sterling Marlin	Junior Johnson & Associates	Ford	24.682	145.855
11	10	Derrike Cope	Whitcomb Racing	Chevrolet	24.703	145.731
12	66	Jimmy Hensley (R)	Cale Yarborough Motorsports	Ford	24.727	145.590
13	5	Ricky Rudd	Hendrick Motorsports	Chevrolet	24.757	145.413
14	2	Rusty Wallace	Penske Racing South	Pontiac	24.776	145.302
15	33	Harry Gant	Leo Jackson Motorsports	Oldsmobile	24.779	145.284
16	42	Kyle Petty	SABCO Racing	Pontiac	24.786	145.243
17	43	Richard Petty	Petty Enterprises	Pontiac	24.813	145.085
18	94	Terry Labonte	Hagan Racing	Oldsmobile	24.818	145.056
19	71	Dave Marcis	Marcis Auto Racing	Chevrolet	24.837	144.945
20	8	Dick Trickle	Stavola Brothers Racing	Ford	24.852	144.858
21	28	Davey Allison	Robert Yates Racing	Ford	24.856	144.834
22	1	Rick Mast	Precision Products Racing	Oldsmobile	24.871	144.747
23	12	Hut Stricklin	Bobby Allison Motorsports	Chevrolet	24.933	144.387
24	3	Dale Earnhardt	Richard Childress Racing	Chevrolet	24.967	144.190
25	9	Chad Little	Melling Racing	Ford	24.980	144.115
26	55	Ted Musgrave	RaDiUs Motorsports	Ford	24.992	144.046
27	41	Greg Sacks	Larry Hedrick Motorsports	Chevrolet	25.044	143.747
28	18	Dale Jarrett	Joe Gibbs Racing	Chevrolet	25.073	143.581
29	68	Bobby Hamilton	TriStar Motorsports	Oldsmobile	25.077	143.558
30	16	Wally Dallenbach Jr.	Roush Racing	Ford	25.131	143.249
31	32	Jimmy Horton	Active Motorsports	Chevrolet	25.619	140.521
32	52	Jimmy Means	Jimmy Means Racing	Pontiac	25.916	138.910
33	77	Mike Potter	Balough Racing	Chevrolet	26.084	138.016
34	65	Jerry O'Neil	Aroneck Racing	Oldsmobile	26.091	137.979
35	59	Andy Belmont (R)	Pat Rissi Racing	Ford	26.490	135.900
36	56	Jerry Hill	Hill Motorsports	Pontiac	27.418	131.301
Provisionals
37	7	Alan Kulwicki	AK Racing	Ford	-	-
38	53	Graham Taylor	Jimmy Means Racing	Pontiac	-	-
39	48	James Hylton	Hylton Motorsports	Pontiac	-	-
40	85	D. K. Ulrich	Aroneck Racing	Oldsmobile	-	-
Official first round qualifying results
Official starting lineup

== Race results ==
Fin	St	#	Driver	Team	Make	Laps	Led	Status	Pts	Winnings
1	15	33	Harry Gant	Leo Jackson Motorsports	Oldsmobile	500	41	running	180	$65,145
2	24	3	Dale Earnhardt	Richard Childress Racing	Chevrolet	500	52	running	175	$43,720
3	14	2	Rusty Wallace	Penske Racing South	Pontiac	499	0	running	165	$25,795
4	9	4	Ernie Irvan	Morgan–McClure Motorsports	Chevrolet	499	46	running	165	$29,445
5	4	17	Darrell Waltrip	Darrell Waltrip Motorsports	Chevrolet	499	104	running	165	$25,140
6	13	5	Ricky Rudd	Hendrick Motorsports	Chevrolet	498	58	running	155	$21,215
7	23	12	Hut Stricklin	Bobby Allison Motorsports	Chevrolet	498	58	running	151	$26,490
8	12	66	Jimmy Hensley (R)	Cale Yarborough Motorsports	Ford	498	0	running	142	$13,140
9	20	8	Dick Trickle	Stavola Brothers Racing	Ford	498	0	running	138	$14,340
10	7	21	Morgan Shepherd	Wood Brothers Racing	Ford	498	52	running	139	$18,040
11	21	28	Davey Allison	Robert Yates Racing	Ford	497	0	running	130	$17,090
12	37	7	Alan Kulwicki	AK Racing	Ford	497	3	running	132	$14,590
13	8	11	Bill Elliott	Junior Johnson & Associates	Ford	496	0	running	124	$14,290
14	10	22	Sterling Marlin	Junior Johnson & Associates	Ford	496	0	running	121	$11,890
15	3	30	Michael Waltrip	Bahari Racing	Pontiac	495	0	running	118	$11,690
16	26	55	Ted Musgrave	RaDiUs Motorsports	Ford	495	0	running	115	$11,390
17	5	15	Geoff Bodine	Bud Moore Engineering	Ford	494	0	running	112	$10,940
18	29	68	Bobby Hamilton	TriStar Motorsports	Oldsmobile	494	0	running	109	$11,525
19	27	41	Greg Sacks	Larry Hedrick Motorsports	Chevrolet	491	0	running	106	$7,240
20	17	43	Richard Petty	Petty Enterprises	Pontiac	489	0	running	103	$10,790
21	18	94	Terry Labonte	Hagan Racing	Oldsmobile	474	4	engine	105	$9,990
22	31	32	Jimmy Horton	Active Motorsports	Chevrolet	474	0	running	97	$5,090
23	6	25	Ken Schrader	Hendrick Motorsports	Chevrolet	470	0	running	94	$14,040
24	2	6	Mark Martin	Roush Racing	Ford	470	64	running	96	$13,890
25	19	71	Dave Marcis	Marcis Auto Racing	Chevrolet	435	0	crash	88	$6,690
26	25	9	Chad Little	Melling Racing	Ford	412	0	transmission	85	$7,890
27	28	18	Dale Jarrett	Joe Gibbs Racing	Chevrolet	308	0	engine	82	$6,490
28	33	77	Mike Potter	Balough Racing	Chevrolet	266	0	valve	79	$4,790
29	16	42	Kyle Petty	SABCO Racing	Pontiac	252	0	crash	76	$9,340
30	1	26	Brett Bodine	King Racing	Ford	247	18	engine	78	$12,765
31	32	52	Jimmy Means	Jimmy Means Racing	Pontiac	201	0	engine	70	$4,640
32	22	1	Rick Mast	Precision Products Racing	Oldsmobile	190	0	crash	67	$9,140
33	11	10	Derrike Cope	Whitcomb Racing	Chevrolet	145	0	crash	64	$6,065
34	30	16	Wally Dallenbach Jr.	Roush Racing	Ford	143	0	crash	61	$5,990
35	39	48	James Hylton	Hylton Motorsports	Pontiac	118	0	handling	58	$4,290
36	34	65	Jerry O'Neil	Aroneck Racing	Oldsmobile	59	0	brakes	55	$4,265
37	35	59	Andy Belmont (R)	Pat Rissi Racing	Ford	59	0	oil leak	52	$4,490
38	36	56	Jerry Hill	Hill Motorsports	Pontiac	39	0	ignition	49	$4,190
39	40	85	D. K. Ulrich	Aroneck Racing	Oldsmobile	21	0	vibration	46	$4,165
40	38	53	Graham Taylor	Jimmy Means Racing	Pontiac	14	0	vibration	43	$4,140
Official race results

== Standings after the race ==
Drivers' Championship standings

	Pos	Driver	Points
	1	Davey Allison	1,694
1	2	Harry Gant	1,624 (-70)
2	3	Dale Earnhardt	1,595 (-99)
2	4	Bill Elliott	1,577 (–117)
1	5	Alan Kulwicki	1,564 (–130)
	6	Terry Labonte	1,483 (–211)
	7	Morgan Shepherd	1,472 (–222)
1	8	Dick Trickle	1,383 (–311)
1	9	Geoff Bodine	1,360 (–334)
1	10	Ricky Rudd	1,346 (–348)
Official driver's standings

- Note: Only the first 10 positions are included for the driver standings.

Previous race: 1992 Coca-Cola 600	NASCAR Winston Cup Series; 1992 season	Next race: 1992 Save Mart 300K
