= 1993 AC Delco 500 =

28th race of the 1993 NASCAR Winston Cup Series

Race details
- Race 28 of 30 in the 1993 NASCAR Winston Cup Series
- The 1993 AC Delco 500 program cover, featuring Dale Earnhardt.
- Date: October 24, 1993
- Official name: 29th Annual AC Delco 500
- Location: Rockingham, North Carolina, North Carolina Motor Speedway
- Course: Permanent racing facility
- Course length: 1.017 miles (1.636 km)
- Distance: 492 laps, 500.364 mi (805.257 km)
- Scheduled distance: 492 laps, 500.364 mi (805.257 km)
- Average speed: 114.036 miles per hour (183.523 km/h)
- Attendance: 55,000

Pole position
| Driver | Mark Martin | Roush Racing |
- Time: 24.679

Most laps led
| Driver | Rusty Wallace | Penske Racing South |
- Laps: 179

Winner
| No. 2 | Rusty Wallace | Penske Racing South |

Television in the United States
- Network: TNN
- Announcers: Mike Joy, Buddy Baker, Neil Bonnett

Radio in the United States
- Radio: Motor Racing Network

The 1993 AC Delco 500 was the 28th stock car race of the 1993 NASCAR Winston Cup Series season and the 29th iteration of the event. The race was held on Sunday, October 24, 1993, in Rockingham, North Carolina, at North Carolina Speedway, a 1.017 miles (1.637 km) permanent high-banked racetrack. The race took the scheduled 492 laps to complete. At race's end, Penske Racing South driver Rusty Wallace would manage to dominate the late stages of the race to continue his championship pursuit on driver's championship leader, Dale Earnhardt, cutting down his lead to 72 points. The victory was Wallace's 30th career NASCAR Winston Cup Series victory and his ninth victory of the season. To fill out the top three, the aforementioned Earnhardt and Junior Johnson & Associates driver Bill Elliott would finish second and third, respectively.

== Background ==
The layout of North Carolina Speedway, the venue where the race was held.

North Carolina Speedway is a 1.017 miles (1.637 km) D-shaped oval track in Rockingham, North Carolina. The track has held a variety of events since its opening in 1965, including the NASCAR Cup Series, O'Reilly Auto Parts Series and Truck Series. It has a 32,000-seat capacity as of 2012. North Carolina Speedway is owned by the International Hot Rod Association (IHRA).

=== Entry list ===
- (R) denotes rookie driver.

| # | Driver | Team | Make |
|---|---|---|---|
| 1 | Rick Mast | Precision Products Racing | Ford |
| 2 | Rusty Wallace | Penske Racing South | Pontiac |
| 02 | T. W. Taylor | Taylor Racing | Ford |
| 3 | Dale Earnhardt | Richard Childress Racing | Chevrolet |
| 4 | Joe Nemechek | Morgan–McClure Motorsports | Chevrolet |
| 5 | Ricky Rudd | Hendrick Motorsports | Chevrolet |
| 05 | Ed Ferree | Ferree Racing | Chevrolet |
| 6 | Mark Martin | Roush Racing | Ford |
| 7 | Geoff Bodine | Geoff Bodine Racing | Ford |
| 8 | Sterling Marlin | Stavola Brothers Racing | Ford |
| 11 | Bill Elliott | Junior Johnson & Associates | Ford |
| 12 | Jimmy Spencer | Bobby Allison Motorsports | Ford |
| 14 | Terry Labonte | Hagan Racing | Chevrolet |
| 15 | Lake Speed | Bud Moore Engineering | Ford |
| 16 | Wally Dallenbach Jr. | Roush Racing | Ford |
| 17 | Darrell Waltrip | Darrell Waltrip Motorsports | Chevrolet |
| 18 | Dale Jarrett | Joe Gibbs Racing | Chevrolet |
| 21 | Morgan Shepherd | Wood Brothers Racing | Ford |
| 22 | Bobby Labonte (R) | Bill Davis Racing | Ford |
| 24 | Jeff Gordon (R) | Hendrick Motorsports | Chevrolet |
| 25 | Ken Schrader | Hendrick Motorsports | Chevrolet |
| 26 | Brett Bodine | King Racing | Ford |
| 27 | Hut Stricklin | Junior Johnson & Associates | Ford |
| 28 | Ernie Irvan | Robert Yates Racing | Ford |
| 30 | Michael Waltrip | Bahari Racing | Pontiac |
| 32 | Jimmy Horton | Active Motorsports | Chevrolet |
| 33 | Harry Gant | Leo Jackson Motorsports | Chevrolet |
| 37 | Loy Allen Jr. | TriStar Motorsports | Ford |
| 40 | Kenny Wallace (R) | SABCO Racing | Pontiac |
| 41 | Dick Trickle | Larry Hedrick Motorsports | Chevrolet |
| 42 | Kyle Petty | SABCO Racing | Pontiac |
| 44 | Rick Wilson | Petty Enterprises | Pontiac |
| 47 | Billy Standridge | Johnson Standridge Racing | Ford |
| 52 | Jimmy Means | Jimmy Means Racing | Ford |
| 55 | Ted Musgrave | RaDiUs Motorsports | Ford |
| 56 | Jerry Hill | Hill Motorsports | Chevrolet |
| 63 | Norm Benning | O'Neil Racing | Oldsmobile |
| 65 | Jerry O'Neil | O'Neil Racing | Chevrolet |
| 66 | Mike Wallace | Owen Racing | Ford |
| 68 | Greg Sacks | TriStar Motorsports | Ford |
| 71 | Dave Marcis | Marcis Auto Racing | Chevrolet |
| 72 | John Andretti | Tex Racing | Chevrolet |
| 75 | Todd Bodine (R) | Butch Mock Motorsports | Ford |
| 90 | Bobby Hillin Jr. | Donlavey Racing | Ford |
| 98 | Derrike Cope | Cale Yarborough Motorsports | Ford |

== Qualifying ==
Qualifying was split into two rounds. The first round was held on Thursday, October 21, at 2:30 PM EST. Each driver would have one lap to set a time. During the first round, the top 20 drivers in the round would be guaranteed a starting spot in the race. If a driver was not able to guarantee a spot in the first round, they had the option to scrub their time from the first round and try and run a faster lap time in a second round qualifying run, held on Saturday, October 22, at 1:00 PM EST. As with the first round, each driver would have one lap to set a time. For this specific race, positions 21-40 would be decided on time, and depending on who needed it, a select amount of positions were given to cars who had not otherwise qualified but were high enough in owner's points; up to two were given. If needed, a past champion who did not qualify on either time or provisionals could use a champion's provisional, adding one more spot to the field.

Mark Martin, driving for Roush Racing, won the pole, setting a time of 24.679 and an average speed of 148.353 mph (238.751 km/h) in the first round.

Four drivers would fail to qualify.

=== Full qualifying results ===
| Pos. | # | Driver | Team | Make | Time | Speed |
|---|---|---|---|---|---|---|
| 1 | 6 | Mark Martin | Roush Racing | Ford | 24.679 | 148.353 |
| 2 | 25 | Ken Schrader | Hendrick Motorsports | Chevrolet | 24.719 | 148.113 |
| 3 | 28 | Ernie Irvan | Robert Yates Racing | Ford | 24.724 | 148.083 |
| 4 | 11 | Bill Elliott | Junior Johnson & Associates | Ford | 24.798 | 147.641 |
| 5 | 5 | Ricky Rudd | Hendrick Motorsports | Chevrolet | 24.821 | 147.504 |
| 6 | 42 | Kyle Petty | SABCO Racing | Pontiac | 24.932 | 146.847 |
| 7 | 24 | Jeff Gordon (R) | Hendrick Motorsports | Chevrolet | 24.934 | 146.836 |
| 8 | 21 | Morgan Shepherd | Wood Brothers Racing | Ford | 24.937 | 146.818 |
| 9 | 33 | Harry Gant | Leo Jackson Motorsports | Chevrolet | 24.955 | 146.712 |
| 10 | 41 | Dick Trickle | Larry Hedrick Motorsports | Chevrolet | 24.973 | 146.606 |
| 11 | 26 | Brett Bodine | King Racing | Ford | 25.040 | 146.214 |
| 12 | 22 | Bobby Labonte (R) | Bill Davis Racing | Ford | 25.062 | 146.086 |
| 13 | 1 | Rick Mast | Precision Products Racing | Ford | 25.072 | 146.027 |
| 14 | 4 | Joe Nemechek | Morgan–McClure Motorsports | Chevrolet | 25.083 | 145.963 |
| 15 | 12 | Jimmy Spencer | Bobby Allison Motorsports | Ford | 25.135 | 145.661 |
| 16 | 17 | Darrell Waltrip | Darrell Waltrip Motorsports | Chevrolet | 25.161 | 145.511 |
| 17 | 98 | Derrike Cope | Cale Yarborough Motorsports | Ford | 25.164 | 145.494 |
| 18 | 2 | Rusty Wallace | Penske Racing South | Pontiac | 25.185 | 145.372 |
| 19 | 7 | Geoff Bodine | Geoff Bodine Racing | Ford | 25.187 | 145.361 |
| 20 | 27 | Hut Stricklin | Junior Johnson & Associates | Ford | 25.197 | 145.303 |
Failed to lock in Round 1
| 21 | 18 | Dale Jarrett | Joe Gibbs Racing | Chevrolet | 24.966 | 146.647 |
| 22 | 3 | Dale Earnhardt | Richard Childress Racing | Chevrolet | 25.081 | 145.975 |
| 23 | 75 | Todd Bodine (R) | Butch Mock Motorsports | Ford | 25.228 | 145.124 |
| 24 | 14 | Terry Labonte | Hagan Racing | Chevrolet | 25.236 | 145.078 |
| 25 | 8 | Sterling Marlin | Stavola Brothers Racing | Ford | 25.246 | 145.021 |
| 26 | 02 | T. W. Taylor | Taylor Racing | Ford | 25.248 | 145.010 |
| 27 | 68 | Greg Sacks | TriStar Motorsports | Ford | 25.261 | 144.935 |
| 28 | 44 | Rick Wilson | Petty Enterprises | Pontiac | 25.269 | 144.889 |
| 29 | 30 | Michael Waltrip | Bahari Racing | Pontiac | 25.304 | 144.689 |
| 30 | 16 | Wally Dallenbach Jr. | Roush Racing | Ford | 25.321 | 144.591 |
| 31 | 15 | Lake Speed | Bud Moore Engineering | Ford | 25.381 | 144.250 |
| 32 | 55 | Ted Musgrave | RaDiUs Motorsports | Ford | 25.403 | 144.125 |
| 33 | 66 | Mike Wallace | Owen Racing | Ford | 25.426 | 143.994 |
| 34 | 71 | Dave Marcis | Marcis Auto Racing | Ford | 25.452 | 143.847 |
| 35 | 32 | Jimmy Horton | Active Motorsports | Chevrolet | 25.453 | 143.842 |
| 36 | 37 | Loy Allen Jr. | TriStar Motorsports | Ford | 25.466 | 143.768 |
| 37 | 52 | Jimmy Means | Jimmy Means Racing | Ford | 25.479 | 143.695 |
| 38 | 90 | Bobby Hillin Jr. | Donlavey Racing | Ford | 25.686 | 142.537 |
| 39 | 72 | John Andretti | Tex Racing | Chevrolet | 25.708 | 142.415 |
| 40 | 56 | Jerry Hill | Hill Motorsports | Chevrolet | 25.987 | 140.886 |
Provisional
| 41 | 40 | Kenny Wallace (R) | SABCO Racing | Pontiac | -* | -* |
Failed to qualify
| 42 | 47 | Billy Standridge | Johnson Standridge Racing | Ford | -* | -* |
| 43 | 63 | Norm Benning | O'Neil Racing | Oldsmobile | -* | -* |
| 44 | 65 | Jerry O'Neil | O'Neil Racing | Chevrolet | -* | -* |
| 45 | 05 | Ed Ferree | Ferree Racing | Chevrolet | -* | -* |
Official first round qualifying results
Official starting lineup

== Race results ==
| Fin | St | # | Driver | Team | Make | Laps | Led | Status | Pts | Winnings |
|---|---|---|---|---|---|---|---|---|---|---|
| 1 | 18 | 2 | Rusty Wallace | Penske Racing South | Pontiac | 492 | 179 | running | 185 | $52,850 |
| 2 | 22 | 3 | Dale Earnhardt | Richard Childress Racing | Chevrolet | 492 | 14 | running | 175 | $49,550 |
| 3 | 4 | 11 | Bill Elliott | Junior Johnson & Associates | Ford | 492 | 0 | running | 165 | $35,675 |
| 4 | 9 | 33 | Harry Gant | Leo Jackson Motorsports | Chevrolet | 492 | 139 | running | 165 | $29,225 |
| 5 | 1 | 6 | Mark Martin | Roush Racing | Ford | 491 | 3 | running | 160 | $33,150 |
| 6 | 3 | 28 | Ernie Irvan | Robert Yates Racing | Ford | 491 | 86 | running | 155 | $24,800 |
| 7 | 16 | 17 | Darrell Waltrip | Darrell Waltrip Motorsports | Chevrolet | 491 | 0 | running | 146 | $21,350 |
| 8 | 2 | 25 | Ken Schrader | Hendrick Motorsports | Chevrolet | 491 | 7 | running | 147 | $17,900 |
| 9 | 10 | 41 | Dick Trickle | Larry Hedrick Motorsports | Chevrolet | 490 | 0 | running | 138 | $14,550 |
| 10 | 19 | 7 | Geoff Bodine | Geoff Bodine Racing | Ford | 490 | 0 | running | 134 | $22,500 |
| 11 | 8 | 21 | Morgan Shepherd | Wood Brothers Racing | Ford | 490 | 0 | running | 130 | $16,150 |
| 12 | 25 | 8 | Sterling Marlin | Stavola Brothers Racing | Ford | 490 | 0 | running | 127 | $16,350 |
| 13 | 6 | 42 | Kyle Petty | SABCO Racing | Pontiac | 490 | 0 | running | 124 | $18,250 |
| 14 | 5 | 5 | Ricky Rudd | Hendrick Motorsports | Chevrolet | 490 | 0 | running | 121 | $15,350 |
| 15 | 24 | 14 | Terry Labonte | Hagan Racing | Chevrolet | 489 | 0 | running | 118 | $15,500 |
| 16 | 31 | 15 | Lake Speed | Bud Moore Engineering | Ford | 489 | 0 | running | 115 | $17,150 |
| 17 | 13 | 1 | Rick Mast | Precision Products Racing | Ford | 489 | 0 | running | 112 | $14,450 |
| 18 | 29 | 30 | Michael Waltrip | Bahari Racing | Pontiac | 489 | 0 | running | 109 | $16,050 |
| 19 | 17 | 98 | Derrike Cope | Cale Yarborough Motorsports | Ford | 489 | 0 | running | 106 | $13,550 |
| 20 | 15 | 12 | Jimmy Spencer | Bobby Allison Motorsports | Ford | 489 | 56 | running | 108 | $14,750 |
| 21 | 7 | 24 | Jeff Gordon (R) | Hendrick Motorsports | Chevrolet | 486 | 0 | running | 100 | $11,350 |
| 22 | 12 | 22 | Bobby Labonte (R) | Bill Davis Racing | Ford | 485 | 0 | running | 97 | $10,150 |
| 23 | 14 | 4 | Joe Nemechek | Morgan–McClure Motorsports | Chevrolet | 485 | 0 | running | 94 | $17,400 |
| 24 | 20 | 27 | Hut Stricklin | Junior Johnson & Associates | Ford | 485 | 0 | running | 91 | $14,950 |
| 25 | 23 | 75 | Todd Bodine (R) | Butch Mock Motorsports | Ford | 485 | 0 | running | 88 | $7,625 |
| 26 | 28 | 44 | Rick Wilson | Petty Enterprises | Pontiac | 482 | 0 | running | 85 | $9,100 |
| 27 | 34 | 71 | Dave Marcis | Marcis Auto Racing | Ford | 478 | 5 | running | 87 | $7,400 |
| 28 | 32 | 55 | Ted Musgrave | RaDiUs Motorsports | Ford | 469 | 0 | running | 79 | $11,875 |
| 29 | 37 | 52 | Jimmy Means | Jimmy Means Racing | Ford | 467 | 1 | running | 81 | $7,200 |
| 30 | 21 | 18 | Dale Jarrett | Joe Gibbs Racing | Chevrolet | 454 | 1 | rear end | 78 | $15,675 |
| 31 | 30 | 16 | Wally Dallenbach Jr. | Roush Racing | Ford | 430 | 0 | handling | 70 | $11,450 |
| 32 | 27 | 68 | Greg Sacks | TriStar Motorsports | Ford | 416 | 0 | running | 67 | $6,800 |
| 33 | 38 | 90 | Bobby Hillin Jr. | Donlavey Racing | Ford | 415 | 0 | running | 64 | $6,700 |
| 34 | 35 | 32 | Jimmy Horton | Active Motorsports | Chevrolet | 304 | 0 | crash | 61 | $6,600 |
| 35 | 11 | 26 | Brett Bodine | King Racing | Ford | 281 | 0 | ignition | 58 | $15,125 |
| 36 | 33 | 66 | Mike Wallace | Owen Racing | Ford | 246 | 0 | engine | 55 | $6,475 |
| 37 | 41 | 40 | Kenny Wallace (R) | SABCO Racing | Pontiac | 181 | 0 | handling | 52 | $7,950 |
| 38 | 40 | 56 | Jerry Hill | Hill Motorsports | Chevrolet | 138 | 0 | engine | 49 | $6,425 |
| 39 | 39 | 72 | John Andretti | Tex Racing | Chevrolet | 122 | 0 | crash | 46 | $6,425 |
| 40 | 26 | 02 | T. W. Taylor | Taylor Racing | Ford | 120 | 1 | crash | 48 | $6,400 |
| 41 | 36 | 37 | Loy Allen Jr. | TriStar Motorsports | Ford | 8 | 0 | crash | 40 | $6,400 |
Official race results

== Standings after the race ==
Drivers' Championship standings

| | Pos | Driver | Points |
|---|---|---|---|
| | 1 | Dale Earnhardt | 4,222 |
| | 2 | Rusty Wallace | 4,150 (-72) |
| | 3 | Mark Martin | 3,862 (-360) |
| | 4 | Dale Jarrett | 3,734 (–488) |
| | 5 | Morgan Shepherd | 3,605 (–617) |
| 1 | 6 | Ken Schrader | 3,569 (–653) |
| 1 | 7 | Kyle Petty | 3,560 (–662) |
| | 8 | Ernie Irvan | 3,532 (–690) |
| | 9 | Bill Elliott | 3,449 (–773) |
| 1 | 10 | Ricky Rudd | 3,319 (–903) |
Official driver's standings

- Note: Only the first 10 positions are included for the driver standings.

| Previous race: 1993 Mello Yello 500 | NASCAR Winston Cup Series; 1993 season | Next race: 1993 Slick 50 500 |
