= 1991 GM Goodwrench 500 =

Third race of the 1991 NASCAR Winston Cup Series

Race details
- Race 3 of 29 in the 1991 NASCAR Winston Cup Series
- The 1991 GM Goodwrench 500 program cover, featuring Dale Earnhardt.
- Date: March 3, 1991
- Official name: 26th Annual GM Goodwrench 500
- Location: Rockingham, North Carolina, North Carolina Speedway
- Course: Permanent racing facility
- Course length: 1.017 miles (1.637 km)
- Distance: 492 laps, 500.364 mi (805.257 km)
- Scheduled distance: 492 laps, 500.364 mi (805.257 km)
- Average speed: 124.083 miles per hour (199.692 km/h)

Pole position
Driver	Kyle Petty	SABCO Racing
- Time: 24.538

Most laps led
Driver	Kyle Petty	SABCO Racing
- Laps: 380

Winner
No. 42	Kyle Petty	SABCO Racing

Television in the United States
- Network: TNN
- Announcers: Mike Joy, Buddy Baker, Neil Bonnett

Radio in the United States
- Radio: Motor Racing Network

The 1991 GM Goodwrench 500 was the third stock car race of the 1991 NASCAR Winston Cup Series season and the 26th iteration of the event. The race was held on Sunday, March 3, 1991, in Rockingham, North Carolina, at North Carolina Speedway, a 1.017 miles (1.637 km) permanent high-banked racetrack. With the assist of a late caution with 14 laps to go in the race, SABCO Racing driver Kyle Petty would manage to catch up and pass for the lead on the ensuing restart with 11 laps to go to take his fourth career NASCAR Winston Cup Series victory and his only victory of the season. To fill out the top three, Hendrick Motorsports driver Ken Schrader and Leo Jackson Motorsports driver Harry Gant would finish second and third, respectively.

== Background ==
The layout of North Carolina Motor Speedway, the venue where the race was held.

North Carolina Motor Speedway was opened as a flat, one-mile oval on October 31, 1965. In 1969, the track was extensively reconfigured to a high-banked, D-shaped oval just over one mile in length. In 1997, North Carolina Motor Speedway merged with Penske Motorsports, and was renamed North Carolina Speedway. Shortly thereafter, the infield was reconfigured, and competition on the infield road course, mostly by the SCCA, was discontinued. Currently, the track is home to the Fast Track High Performance Driving School.

=== Entry list ===
- (R) denotes rookie driver.

#	Driver	Team	Make
1	Rick Mast	Precision Products Racing	Oldsmobile
2	Rusty Wallace	Penske Racing South	Pontiac
3	Dale Earnhardt	Richard Childress Racing	Chevrolet
4	Ernie Irvan	Morgan–McClure Motorsports	Chevrolet
04	Bill Meacham	Meacham Racing	Oldsmobile
5	Ricky Rudd	Hendrick Motorsports	Chevrolet
6	Mark Martin	Roush Racing	Ford
7	Alan Kulwicki	AK Racing	Ford
8	Rick Wilson	Stavola Brothers Racing	Buick
9	Bill Elliott	Melling Racing	Ford
10	Derrike Cope	Whitcomb Racing	Chevrolet
11	Geoff Bodine	Junior Johnson & Associates	Ford
12	Hut Stricklin	Bobby Allison Motorsports	Buick
13	Mike Skinner	Mansion Motorsports	Chevrolet
15	Morgan Shepherd	Bud Moore Engineering	Ford
17	Darrell Waltrip	Darrell Waltrip Motorsports	Chevrolet
19	Chad Little	Little Racing	Ford
20	Bobby Hillin Jr.	Moroso Racing	Oldsmobile
21	Dale Jarrett	Wood Brothers Racing	Ford
22	Sterling Marlin	Junior Johnson & Associates	Ford
24	Mickey Gibbs	Team III Racing	Pontiac
25	Ken Schrader	Hendrick Motorsports	Chevrolet
26	Brett Bodine	King Racing	Buick
28	Davey Allison	Robert Yates Racing	Ford
29	Andy Hillenburg	Andy Hillenburg Racing	Buick
30	Michael Waltrip	Bahari Racing	Pontiac
33	Harry Gant	Leo Jackson Motorsports	Oldsmobile
42	Kyle Petty	SABCO Racing	Pontiac
43	Richard Petty	Petty Enterprises	Pontiac
47	Rich Bickle	Close Racing	Oldsmobile
49	Stanley Smith (R)	BS&S Motorsports	Buick
51	Jeff Purvis (R)	Phoenix Racing	Oldsmobile
52	Jimmy Means	Jimmy Means Racing	Pontiac
55	Ted Musgrave (R)	U.S. Racing	Pontiac
64	Gary Wright	White Racing	Chevrolet
66	Dick Trickle	Cale Yarborough Motorsports	Pontiac
68	Bobby Hamilton (R)	TriStar Motorsports	Oldsmobile
70	J. D. McDuffie	McDuffie Racing	Pontiac
71	Dave Marcis	Marcis Auto Racing	Chevrolet
75	Joe Ruttman	RahMoc Enterprises	Oldsmobile
82	Mark Stahl	Stahl Racing	Ford
94	Terry Labonte	Hagan Racing	Oldsmobile
98	Jimmy Spencer	Travis Carter Enterprises	Chevrolet

== Qualifying ==
Qualifying was split into two rounds. The first round was held on Thursday, February 28, at 2:30 PM EST. Each driver would have one lap to set a time. During the first round, the top 20 drivers in the round would be guaranteed a starting spot in the race. If a driver was not able to guarantee a spot in the first round, they had the option to scrub their time from the first round and try and run a faster lap time in a second round qualifying run, held on Friday, March 1, at 2:00 PM EST. As with the first round, each driver would have one lap to set a time. For this specific race, positions 21-40 would be decided on time, and depending on who needed it, a select amount of positions were given to cars who had not otherwise qualified but were high enough in owner's points; up to two were given. If needed, a past champion who did not qualify on either time or provisionals could use a champion's provisional, adding one more spot to the field.

Kyle Petty, driving for SABCO Racing, would win the pole, setting a time of 24.538 and an average speed of 149.205 miles per hour (240.122 km/h) in the first round.

=== Full qualifying results ===
Pos.	#	Driver	Team	Make	Time	Speed
1	42	Kyle Petty	SABCO Racing	Pontiac	24.538	149.205
2	25	Ken Schrader	Hendrick Motorsports	Chevrolet	24.540	149.193
3	28	Davey Allison	Robert Yates Racing	Ford	24.621	148.702
4	33	Harry Gant	Leo Jackson Motorsports	Oldsmobile	24.631	148.642
5	5	Ricky Rudd	Hendrick Motorsports	Chevrolet	24.664	148.443
6	30	Michael Waltrip	Bahari Racing	Pontiac	24.696	148.251
7	11	Geoff Bodine	Junior Johnson & Associates	Ford	24.724	148.083
8	7	Alan Kulwicki	AK Racing	Ford	24.727	148.065
9	8	Rick Wilson	Stavola Brothers Racing	Buick	24.807	147.587
10	2	Rusty Wallace	Penske Racing South	Pontiac	24.807	147.587
11	1	Rick Mast	Precision Products Racing	Oldsmobile	24.811	147.563
12	9	Bill Elliott	Melling Racing	Ford	24.844	147.368
13	3	Dale Earnhardt	Richard Childress Racing	Chevrolet	24.849	147.338
14	10	Derrike Cope	Whitcomb Racing	Chevrolet	24.854	147.308
15	4	Ernie Irvan	Morgan–McClure Motorsports	Chevrolet	24.857	147.291
16	26	Brett Bodine	King Racing	Buick	24.866	147.237
17	17	Darrell Waltrip	Darrell Waltrip Motorsports	Chevrolet	24.885	147.125
18	21	Dale Jarrett	Wood Brothers Racing	Ford	24.895	147.066
19	68	Bobby Hamilton (R)	TriStar Motorsports	Oldsmobile	24.917	146.936
20	15	Morgan Shepherd	Bud Moore Engineering	Ford	24.964	146.659
Failed to lock in Round 1
21	22	Sterling Marlin	Junior Johnson & Associates	Ford	24.967	146.642
22	66	Dick Trickle	Cale Yarborough Motorsports	Pontiac	24.969	146.630
23	6	Mark Martin	Roush Racing	Ford	24.985	146.536
24	94	Terry Labonte	Hagan Racing	Oldsmobile	24.990	146.507
25	43	Richard Petty	Petty Enterprises	Pontiac	24.993	146.489
26	20	Bobby Hillin Jr.	Moroso Racing	Oldsmobile	25.009	146.395
27	19	Chad Little	Little Racing	Ford	25.026	146.296
28	24	Mickey Gibbs	Team III Racing	Pontiac	25.033	146.255
29	98	Jimmy Spencer	Travis Carter Enterprises	Chevrolet	25.049	146.162
30	71	Dave Marcis	Marcis Auto Racing	Chevrolet	25.123	145.731
31	12	Hut Stricklin	Bobby Allison Motorsports	Buick	25.282	144.814
32	29	Andy Hillenburg	Andy Hillenburg Racing	Buick	25.317	144.614
33	51	Jeff Purvis (R)	Phoenix Racing	Oldsmobile	25.420	144.028
34	49	Stanley Smith (R)	BS&S Motorsports	Buick	25.488	143.644
35	75	Joe Ruttman	RahMoc Enterprises	Oldsmobile	25.497	143.593
36	47	Rich Bickle	Close Racing	Oldsmobile	25.531	143.402
37	13	Mike Skinner	Mansion Motorsports	Chevrolet	25.818	141.808
38	52	Jimmy Means	Jimmy Means Racing	Pontiac	26.021	140.702
39	04	Bill Meacham	Meacham Racing	Oldsmobile	26.057	140.507
40	55	Ted Musgrave (R)	U.S. Racing	Pontiac	26.146	140.029
Failed to qualify
41	82	Mark Stahl	Stahl Racing	Ford	26.197	139.756
42	70	J. D. McDuffie	McDuffie Racing	Pontiac	26.409	138.635
43	64	Gary Wright	White Racing	Chevrolet	27.620	132.556
Official first round qualifying results
Official starting lineup

== Race results ==
Fin	St	#	Driver	Team	Make	Laps	Led	Status	Pts	Winnings
1	1	42	Kyle Petty	SABCO Racing	Pontiac	492	380	running	185	$131,450
2	2	25	Ken Schrader	Hendrick Motorsports	Chevrolet	492	40	running	175	$34,575
3	4	33	Harry Gant	Leo Jackson Motorsports	Oldsmobile	491	0	running	165	$23,950
4	5	5	Ricky Rudd	Hendrick Motorsports	Chevrolet	491	0	running	160	$20,250
5	12	9	Bill Elliott	Melling Racing	Ford	491	10	running	160	$21,275
6	15	4	Ernie Irvan	Morgan–McClure Motorsports	Chevrolet	490	0	running	150	$15,900
7	6	30	Michael Waltrip	Bahari Racing	Pontiac	490	0	running	146	$12,400
8	13	3	Dale Earnhardt	Richard Childress Racing	Chevrolet	489	0	running	142	$18,850
9	17	17	Darrell Waltrip	Darrell Waltrip Motorsports	Chevrolet	488	0	running	138	$7,700
10	20	15	Morgan Shepherd	Bud Moore Engineering	Ford	488	0	running	134	$17,500
11	18	21	Dale Jarrett	Wood Brothers Racing	Ford	488	0	running	130	$11,100
12	7	11	Geoff Bodine	Junior Johnson & Associates	Ford	488	0	running	127	$15,600
13	16	26	Brett Bodine	King Racing	Buick	487	0	running	124	$10,500
14	23	6	Mark Martin	Roush Racing	Ford	486	0	running	121	$15,400
15	25	43	Richard Petty	Petty Enterprises	Pontiac	486	0	running	118	$9,900
16	3	28	Davey Allison	Robert Yates Racing	Ford	486	0	running	115	$14,700
17	8	7	Alan Kulwicki	AK Racing	Ford	485	0	running	112	$12,800
18	26	20	Bobby Hillin Jr.	Moroso Racing	Oldsmobile	485	0	running	109	$7,200
19	9	8	Rick Wilson	Stavola Brothers Racing	Buick	485	0	running	106	$8,650
20	28	24	Mickey Gibbs	Team III Racing	Pontiac	484	0	running	103	$6,300
21	19	68	Bobby Hamilton (R)	TriStar Motorsports	Oldsmobile	484	0	running	100	$5,700
22	27	19	Chad Little	Little Racing	Ford	483	0	running	97	$5,950
23	30	71	Dave Marcis	Marcis Auto Racing	Chevrolet	482	1	running	99	$7,700
24	35	75	Joe Ruttman	RahMoc Enterprises	Oldsmobile	481	0	running	91	$7,550
25	40	55	Ted Musgrave (R)	U.S. Racing	Pontiac	481	0	running	88	$5,700
26	36	47	Rich Bickle	Close Racing	Oldsmobile	480	0	running	85	$5,150
27	38	52	Jimmy Means	Jimmy Means Racing	Pontiac	472	0	running	82	$5,000
28	10	2	Rusty Wallace	Penske Racing South	Pontiac	467	61	engine	84	$15,500
29	22	66	Dick Trickle	Cale Yarborough Motorsports	Pontiac	448	0	running	76	$6,875
30	11	1	Rick Mast	Precision Products Racing	Oldsmobile	421	0	engine	73	$6,800
31	31	12	Hut Stricklin	Bobby Allison Motorsports	Buick	400	0	running	70	$7,150
32	37	13	Mike Skinner	Mansion Motorsports	Chevrolet	338	0	running	67	$3,900
33	21	22	Sterling Marlin	Junior Johnson & Associates	Ford	287	0	engine	64	$3,750
34	14	10	Derrike Cope	Whitcomb Racing	Chevrolet	287	0	engine	61	$12,100
35	33	51	Jeff Purvis (R)	Phoenix Racing	Oldsmobile	165	0	camshaft	58	$3,600
36	39	04	Bill Meacham	Meacham Racing	Oldsmobile	115	0	ignition	55	$3,525
37	34	49	Stanley Smith (R)	BS&S Motorsports	Buick	25	0	overheating	52	$3,475
38	29	98	Jimmy Spencer	Travis Carter Enterprises	Chevrolet	19	0	crash	49	$6,060
39	24	94	Terry Labonte	Hagan Racing	Oldsmobile	14	0	crash	46	$5,425
40	32	29	Andy Hillenburg	Andy Hillenburg Racing	Buick	6	0	engine	43	$3,400
Official race results

== Standings after the race ==
Drivers' Championship standings

	Pos	Driver	Points
	1	Dale Earnhardt	482
	2	Ricky Rudd	478 (-4)
3	3	Harry Gant	423 (-59)
	4	Alan Kulwicki	414 (–68)
	5	Ernie Irvan	412 (–70)
14	6	Kyle Petty	398 (–84)
6	7	Darrell Waltrip	385 (–97)
1	8	Dale Jarrett	380 (–102)
13	9	Ken Schrader	379 (–103)
7	10	Sterling Marlin	377 (–105)
Official driver's standings

- Note: Only the first 10 positions are included for the driver standings.

Previous race: 1991 Pontiac Excitement 400	NASCAR Winston Cup Series; 1991 season	Next race: 1991 Motorcraft Quality Parts 500
