= 1991 Motorcraft Quality Parts 500 =

Fourth race of the 1991 NASCAR Winston Cup Series

Race details
- Race 4 of 29 in the 1991 NASCAR Winston Cup Series
- The 1991 Motorcraft Quality Parts 500 program cover, featuring Morgan Shepherd.
- Date: March 17 & 18, 1991
- Official name: 32nd Annual Motorcraft Quality Parts 500
- Location: Hampton, Georgia, Atlanta Motor Speedway
- Course: Permanent racing facility
- Course length: 1.522 miles (2.449 km)
- Distance: 328 laps, 499.216 mi (803.41 km)
- Scheduled distance: 328 laps, 499.216 mi (803.41 km)
- Average speed: 140.47 miles per hour (226.06 km/h)

Pole position
Driver	Alan Kulwicki	AK Racing
- Time: 31.415

Most laps led
Driver	Bill Elliott	Melling Racing
- Laps: 102

Winner
No. 25	Ken Schrader	Hendrick Motorsports

Television in the United States
- Network: ABC
- Announcers: Paul Page, Benny Parsons, Bobby Unser

Radio in the United States
- Radio: Motor Racing Network

The 1991 Motorcraft Quality Parts 500 was the fourth stock car race of the 1991 NASCAR Winston Cup Series and the 32nd iteration of the event. The race took place over the days of Sunday, March 17 and Monday, March 18, 1991, due to rain delays that left only the first 47 laps of the race being run on Sunday. The race was held in Hampton, Georgia, at Atlanta Motor Speedway, a 1.522 miles (2.449 km) permanent asphalt oval speedway. The race took the scheduled 328 laps to complete. Depending on fuel mileage, Hendrick Motorsports driver Ken Schrader would manage to stretch the final 65 laps of the race on one tank of fuel to take his third career NASCAR Winston Cup Series victory and his first victory of the season. To fill out the top three, Melling Racing driver Bill Elliott and Richard Childress Racing driver Dale Earnhardt would finish second and third, respectively.

The Monday portion of the race was never televised; ABC was unable to air it due to daytime television commitments and there was no cable partner that could pick up the Monday coverage at that time (ESPN didn't become a sister network to ABC until 1996).

== Background ==
The layout of Atlanta Motor Speedway, the circuit where the race was held.

Atlanta Motor Speedway (formerly Atlanta International Raceway) is a 1.522-mile race track in Hampton, Georgia, United States, 20 miles (32 km) south of Atlanta. It has annually hosted NASCAR Winston Cup Series stock car races since its inauguration in 1960.

The venue was bought by Speedway Motorsports in 1990. In 1994, 46 condominiums were built over the northeastern side of the track. In 1997, to standardize the track with Speedway Motorsports' other two intermediate ovals, the entire track was almost completely rebuilt. The frontstretch and backstretch were swapped, and the configuration of the track was changed from oval to quad-oval, with a new official length of 1.54-mile (2.48 km) where before it was 1.522-mile (2.449 km). The project made the track one of the fastest on the NASCAR circuit.

=== Entry list ===
- (R) - denotes rookie driver.

#	Driver	Team	Make
1	Rick Mast	Precision Products Racing	Oldsmobile
2	Rusty Wallace	Penske Racing South	Pontiac
3	Dale Earnhardt	Richard Childress Racing	Chevrolet
4	Ernie Irvan	Morgan–McClure Motorsports	Chevrolet
5	Ricky Rudd	Hendrick Motorsports	Chevrolet
6	Mark Martin	Roush Racing	Ford
7	Alan Kulwicki	AK Racing	Ford
8	Rick Wilson	Stavola Brothers Racing	Buick
9	Bill Elliott	Melling Racing	Ford
10	Derrike Cope	Whitcomb Racing	Chevrolet
11	Geoff Bodine	Junior Johnson & Associates	Ford
12	Hut Stricklin	Bobby Allison Motorsports	Buick
13	Mike Skinner	Mansion Motorsports	Chevrolet
15	Morgan Shepherd	Bud Moore Engineering	Ford
17	Darrell Waltrip	Darrell Waltrip Motorsports	Chevrolet
19	Chad Little	Little Racing	Ford
20	Bobby Hillin Jr.	Moroso Racing	Oldsmobile
21	Dale Jarrett	Wood Brothers Racing	Ford
22	Sterling Marlin	Junior Johnson & Associates	Ford
24	Mickey Gibbs	Team III Racing	Pontiac
25	Ken Schrader	Hendrick Motorsports	Chevrolet
26	Brett Bodine	King Racing	Buick
28	Davey Allison	Robert Yates Racing	Ford
29	Andy Hillenburg	Andy Hillenburg Racing	Buick
30	Michael Waltrip	Bahari Racing	Pontiac
33	Harry Gant	Leo Jackson Motorsports	Oldsmobile
42	Kyle Petty	SABCO Racing	Pontiac
43	Richard Petty	Petty Enterprises	Pontiac
47	Rich Bickle	Close Racing	Oldsmobile
49	Stanley Smith (R)	BS&S Motorsports	Buick
51	Jeff Purvis (R)	Phoenix Racing	Oldsmobile
52	Jimmy Means	Jimmy Means Racing	Pontiac
55	Ted Musgrave (R)	U.S. Racing	Pontiac
65	Dave Mader III	Bahre Racing	Pontiac
66	Dick Trickle	Cale Yarborough Motorsports	Pontiac
68	Bobby Hamilton (R)	TriStar Motorsports	Oldsmobile
71	Dave Marcis	Marcis Auto Racing	Chevrolet
75	Joe Ruttman	RahMoc Enterprises	Oldsmobile
82	Mark Stahl	Stahl Racing	Ford
90	Wally Dallenbach Jr. (R)	Donlavey Racing	Ford
94	Terry Labonte	Hagan Racing	Oldsmobile
98	Jimmy Spencer	Travis Carter Enterprises	Chevrolet

*Sponsored Alan Kulwicki in a one-race deal after their primary driver they sponsored, Mark Stahl failed to qualify.

== Qualifying ==
Qualifying was split into two rounds. The first round was held on Friday, March 15, at 2:00 PM EST. Each driver would have one lap to set a time. During the first round, the top 20 drivers in the round would be guaranteed a starting spot in the race. If a driver was not able to guarantee a spot in the first round, they had the option to scrub their time from the first round and try and run a faster lap time in a second round qualifying run, held on Saturday, March 16, at 10:30 AM EST. As with the first round, each driver would have one lap to set a time. For this specific race, positions 21-40 would be decided on time, and depending on who needed it, a select amount of positions were given to cars who had not otherwise qualified but were high enough in owner's points; which was usually two. If needed, a past champion who did not qualify on either time or provisionals could use a champion's provisional, adding one more spot to the field.

Alan Kulwicki, driving for his own AK Racing team, won the pole, setting a time of 31.415 and an average speed of 174.413 mph (280.691 km/h) in the first round. In the second round, Richard Childress Racing driver Dale Earnhardt would manage to beat his time with a time of 31.247; however, since the time was in the second round, Earnhardt would only garner the 21st starting position.

Two drivers would fail to qualify.

=== Full qualifying results ===
Pos.	#	Driver	Team	Make	Time	Speed
1	7	Alan Kulwicki	AK Racing	Ford	31.415	174.413
2	26	Brett Bodine	King Racing	Buick	31.494	173.976
3	2	Rusty Wallace	Penske Racing South	Pontiac	31.501	173.937
4	22	Sterling Marlin	Junior Johnson & Associates	Ford	31.532	173.766
5	25	Ken Schrader	Hendrick Motorsports	Chevrolet	31.618	173.294
6	6	Mark Martin	Roush Racing	Ford	31.621	173.277
7	42	Kyle Petty	SABCO Racing	Pontiac	31.623	173.266
8	28	Davey Allison	Robert Yates Racing	Ford	31.632	173.217
9	10	Derrike Cope	Whitcomb Racing	Chevrolet	31.682	172.932
10	4	Ernie Irvan	Morgan–McClure Motorsports	Chevrolet	31.776	172.432
11	5	Ricky Rudd	Hendrick Motorsports	Chevrolet	31.780	172.410
12	33	Harry Gant	Leo Jackson Motorsports	Oldsmobile	31.809	172.253
13	30	Michael Waltrip	Bahari Racing	Pontiac	31.821	172.188
14	20	Bobby Hillin Jr.	Moroso Racing	Oldsmobile	31.823	172.177
15	9	Bill Elliott	Melling Racing	Ford	31.853	172.015
16	17	Darrell Waltrip	Darrell Waltrip Motorsports	Chevrolet	31.871	171.918
17	98	Jimmy Spencer	Travis Carter Enterprises	Chevrolet	31.927	171.617
18	12	Hut Stricklin	Bobby Allison Motorsports	Buick	31.931	171.595
19	68	Bobby Hamilton (R)	TriStar Motorsports	Oldsmobile	31.961	171.434
20	15	Morgan Shepherd	Bud Moore Engineering	Ford	31.967	171.402
Failed to lock in Round 1
21	3	Dale Earnhardt	Richard Childress Racing	Chevrolet	31.247	175.351
22	21	Dale Jarrett	Wood Brothers Racing	Ford	31.595	173.420
23	1	Rick Mast	Precision Products Racing	Oldsmobile	31.853	172.015
24	89	Jim Sauter	Mueller Brothers Racing	Pontiac	31.902	171.751
25	52	Jimmy Means	Jimmy Means Racing	Pontiac	31.973	171.370
26	11	Geoff Bodine	Junior Johnson & Associates	Ford	32.001	171.220
27	66	Dick Trickle	Cale Yarborough Motorsports	Pontiac	32.009	171.177
28	19	Chad Little	Little Racing	Ford	32.027	171.081
29	51	Jeff Purvis (R)	Phoenix Racing	Oldsmobile	32.079	170.803
30	43	Richard Petty	Petty Enterprises	Pontiac	32.106	170.660
31	8	Rick Wilson	Stavola Brothers Racing	Buick	32.120	170.585
32	94	Terry Labonte	Hagan Racing	Oldsmobile	32.129	170.538
33	90	Wally Dallenbach Jr. (R)	Donlavey Racing	Ford	32.152	170.416
34	55	Ted Musgrave (R)	RaDiUs Motorsports	Pontiac	32.189	170.220
35	24	Mickey Gibbs	Team III Racing	Pontiac	32.223	169.987
36	65	Dave Mader III	Bahre Racing	Pontiac	32.255	169.871
37	29	Andy Hillenburg	Andy Hillenburg Racing	Buick	32.320	169.530
38	75	Joe Ruttman	RahMoc Enterprises	Oldsmobile	32.364	169.299
39	71	Dave Marcis	Marcis Auto Racing	Chevrolet	32.370	169.268
40	47	Rich Bickle	Close Racing	Oldsmobile	32.441	168.897
Failed to qualify
41	49	Stanley Smith (R)	BS&S Motorsports	Buick	-*	-*
42	82	Mark Stahl	Stahl Racing	Ford	-*	-*
Official first round qualifying results
Official starting lineup

== Race results ==
Fin	St	#	Driver	Team	Make	Laps	Led	Status	Pts	Winnings
1	5	25	Ken Schrader	Hendrick Motorsports	Chevrolet	328	59	running	180	$69,250
2	15	9	Bill Elliott	Melling Racing	Ford	328	102	running	180	$47,675
3	21	3	Dale Earnhardt	Richard Childress Racing	Chevrolet	328	29	running	170	$37,000
4	20	15	Morgan Shepherd	Bud Moore Engineering	Ford	328	0	running	160	$23,600
5	13	30	Michael Waltrip	Bahari Racing	Pontiac	328	30	running	160	$21,400
6	11	5	Ricky Rudd	Hendrick Motorsports	Chevrolet	328	0	running	150	$17,750
7	4	22	Sterling Marlin	Junior Johnson & Associates	Ford	328	41	running	151	$17,600
8	1	7	Alan Kulwicki	AK Racing	Ford	327	8	running	147	$20,150
9	16	17	Darrell Waltrip	Darrell Waltrip Motorsports	Chevrolet	327	0	running	138	$7,450
10	3	2	Rusty Wallace	Penske Racing South	Pontiac	327	0	running	134	$6,700
11	9	10	Derrike Cope	Whitcomb Racing	Chevrolet	327	0	running	130	$14,670
12	31	8	Rick Wilson	Stavola Brothers Racing	Buick	326	0	running	127	$12,725
13	18	12	Hut Stricklin	Bobby Allison Motorsports	Buick	326	0	running	124	$11,930
14	10	4	Ernie Irvan	Morgan–McClure Motorsports	Chevrolet	326	0	running	121	$12,710
15	2	26	Brett Bodine	King Racing	Buick	325	0	running	118	$10,230
16	17	98	Jimmy Spencer	Travis Carter Enterprises	Chevrolet	325	0	running	115	$11,070
17	6	6	Mark Martin	Roush Racing	Ford	325	21	running	117	$15,310
18	28	19	Chad Little	Little Racing	Ford	325	0	running	109	$8,500
19	12	33	Harry Gant	Leo Jackson Motorsports	Oldsmobile	325	0	running	106	$8,690
20	22	21	Dale Jarrett	Wood Brothers Racing	Ford	325	0	running	103	$10,470
21	14	20	Bobby Hillin Jr.	Moroso Racing	Oldsmobile	324	0	running	100	$5,960
22	24	89	Jim Sauter	Mueller Brothers Racing	Pontiac	323	0	running	97	$5,800
23	26	11	Geoff Bodine	Junior Johnson & Associates	Ford	323	1	running	99	$13,490
24	29	51	Jeff Purvis (R)	Phoenix Racing	Oldsmobile	321	0	running	91	$5,380
25	35	24	Mickey Gibbs	Team III Racing	Pontiac	320	0	running	88	$5,075
26	33	90	Wally Dallenbach Jr. (R)	Donlavey Racing	Ford	319	0	running	85	$4,420
27	38	75	Joe Ruttman	RahMoc Enterprises	Oldsmobile	319	0	running	82	$7,310
28	27	66	Dick Trickle	Cale Yarborough Motorsports	Pontiac	319	0	running	79	$7,175
29	23	1	Rick Mast	Precision Products Racing	Oldsmobile	319	0	running	76	$6,975
30	36	65	Dave Mader III	Bahre Racing	Pontiac	318	0	running	73	$4,740
31	25	52	Jimmy Means	Jimmy Means Racing	Pontiac	316	0	running	70	$4,680
32	37	29	Andy Hillenburg	Andy Hillenburg Racing	Buick	314	0	running	67	$4,120
33	19	68	Bobby Hamilton (R)	TriStar Motorsports	Oldsmobile	290	0	running	64	$3,780
34	40	47	Rich Bickle	Close Racing	Oldsmobile	282	0	engine	61	$4,445
35	32	94	Terry Labonte	Hagan Racing	Oldsmobile	256	0	camshaft	58	$6,385
36	39	71	Dave Marcis	Marcis Auto Racing	Chevrolet	240	0	engine	55	$6,220
37	34	55	Ted Musgrave (R)	RaDiUs Motorsports	Pontiac	210	0	engine	52	$4,280
38	30	43	Richard Petty	Petty Enterprises	Pontiac	188	0	engine	49	$6,240
39	7	42	Kyle Petty	SABCO Racing	Pontiac	173	37	engine	51	$12,115
40	8	28	Davey Allison	Robert Yates Racing	Ford	56	0	crash	43	$13,175
Official race results

== Standings after the race ==
Drivers' Championship standings

	Pos	Driver	Points
	1	Dale Earnhardt	652
	2	Ricky Rudd	628 (-24)
1	3	Alan Kulwicki	561 (-91)
5	4	Ken Schrader	559 (–93)
	5	Ernie Irvan	533 (–119)
3	6	Harry Gant	529 (–123)
4	7	Sterling Marlin	528 (–124)
1	8	Darrell Waltrip	523 (–129)
7	9	Morgan Shepherd	497 (–155)
13	10	Bill Elliott	492 (–160)
Official driver's standings

- Note: Only the first 10 positions are included for the driver standings.

Previous race: 1991 GM Goodwrench 500	NASCAR Winston Cup Series; 1991 season	Next race: 1991 TranSouth 500
