= 1991 TranSouth 500 =

Fifth race of the 1991 NASCAR Winston Cup Series

Race details
- Race 5 of 29 in the 1991 NASCAR Winston Cup Series
- The 1991 TranSouth 500 program cover, featuring Dale Earnhardt.
- Date: April 7, 1991
- Official name: 35th Annual TranSouth 500
- Location: Darlington, South Carolina, Darlington Raceway
- Course: Permanent racing facility
- Course length: 1.366 miles (2.198 km)
- Distance: 367 laps, 501.322 mi (806.799 km)
- Scheduled distance: 367 laps, 501.322 mi (806.799 km)
- Average speed: 135.594 miles per hour (218.217 km/h)
- Attendance: 50,000

Pole position
Driver	Geoff Bodine	Junior Johnson & Associates
- Time: 30.367

Most laps led
Driver	Michael Waltrip	Bahari Racing
- Laps: 208

Winner
No. 5	Ricky Rudd	Hendrick Motorsports

Television in the United States
- Network: ESPN
- Announcers: Bob Jenkins, Ned Jarrett, Benny Parsons

Radio in the United States
- Radio: Motor Racing Network

The 1991 TranSouth 500 was the fifth stock car race of the 1991 NASCAR Winston Cup Series season and the 35th iteration of the event. The race was held on Sunday, April 7, 1991, before an audience of 50,000 in Darlington, South Carolina, at Darlington Raceway, a 1.366 miles (2.198 km) permanent egg-shaped oval racetrack. The race took the scheduled 367 laps to complete. At race's end, Hendrick Motorsports driver Ricky Rudd would manage to dominate the late stages of the race to take his 12th career NASCAR Winston Cup Series victory and his only victory of the season. To fill out the top three, Robert Yates Racing driver Davey Allison and Bahari Racing driver Michael Waltrip would finish second and third, respectively.

== Background ==
The layout of Darlington Raceway, the venue where the race was held.

Darlington Raceway is a race track built for NASCAR racing located near Darlington, South Carolina. It is nicknamed "The Lady in Black" and "The Track Too Tough to Tame" by many NASCAR fans and drivers and advertised as "A NASCAR Tradition." It is of a unique, somewhat egg-shaped design, an oval with the ends of very different configurations, a condition which supposedly arose from the proximity of one end of the track to a minnow pond the owner refused to relocate. This situation makes it very challenging for the crews to set up their cars' handling in a way that is effective at both ends.

=== Entry list ===
- (R) denotes rookie driver.

#	Driver	Team	Make
1	Rick Mast	Precision Products Racing	Oldsmobile
2	Rusty Wallace	Penske Racing South	Pontiac
3	Dale Earnhardt	Richard Childress Racing	Chevrolet
4	Ernie Irvan	Morgan–McClure Motorsports	Chevrolet
5	Ricky Rudd	Hendrick Motorsports	Chevrolet
05	Bill Meacham	Meacham Racing	Oldsmobile
6	Mark Martin	Roush Racing	Ford
7	Alan Kulwicki	AK Racing	Ford
8	Rick Wilson	Stavola Brothers Racing	Buick
9	Bill Elliott	Melling Racing	Ford
10	Derrike Cope	Whitcomb Racing	Chevrolet
11	Geoff Bodine	Junior Johnson & Associates	Ford
12	Hut Stricklin	Bobby Allison Motorsports	Buick
15	Morgan Shepherd	Bud Moore Engineering	Ford
17	Darrell Waltrip	Darrell Waltrip Motorsports	Chevrolet
19	Chad Little	Little Racing	Ford
20	Bobby Hillin Jr.	Moroso Racing	Oldsmobile
21	Dale Jarrett	Wood Brothers Racing	Ford
22	Sterling Marlin	Junior Johnson & Associates	Ford
24	Mickey Gibbs	Team III Racing	Pontiac
25	Ken Schrader	Hendrick Motorsports	Chevrolet
26	Brett Bodine	King Racing	Buick
28	Davey Allison	Robert Yates Racing	Ford
30	Michael Waltrip	Bahari Racing	Pontiac
33	Harry Gant	Leo Jackson Motorsports	Oldsmobile
36	H. B. Bailey	Bailey Racing	Pontiac
42	Kyle Petty	SABCO Racing	Pontiac
43	Richard Petty	Petty Enterprises	Pontiac
47	Rich Bickle	Close Racing	Oldsmobile
52	Jimmy Means	Jimmy Means Racing	Pontiac
55	Ted Musgrave (R)	U.S. Racing	Pontiac
65	Dave Mader III	Bahre Racing	Pontiac
66	Lake Speed	Cale Yarborough Motorsports	Pontiac
68	Bobby Hamilton (R)	TriStar Motorsports	Oldsmobile
70	J. D. McDuffie	McDuffie Racing	Pontiac
71	Dave Marcis	Marcis Auto Racing	Chevrolet
75	Joe Ruttman	RahMoc Enterprises	Oldsmobile
82	Mark Stahl	Stahl Racing	Ford
87	Randy Baker	Buck Baker Racing	Chevrolet
94	Terry Labonte	Hagan Racing	Oldsmobile
98	Jimmy Spencer	Travis Carter Enterprises	Chevrolet

== Qualifying ==
Qualifying was split into two rounds. The first round was held on Thursday, April 4, at 3:00 PM EST. Each driver would have one lap to set a time. During the first round, the top 20 drivers in the round would be guaranteed a starting spot in the race. If a driver was not able to guarantee a spot in the first round, they had the option to scrub their time from the first round and try and run a faster lap time in a second round qualifying run, held on Friday, April 5, at 11:30 AM EST. As with the first round, each driver would have one lap to set a time. For this specific race, positions 21-40 would be decided on time, and depending on who needed it, a select amount of positions were given to cars who had not otherwise qualified but were high enough in owner's points; which was usually two. If needed, a past champion who did not qualify on either time or provisionals could use a champion's provisional, adding one more spot to the field.

Geoff Bodine, driving for Junior Johnson & Associates, would win the pole, setting a time of 30.367 and an average speed of 161.939 miles per hour (260.616 km/h) in the first round.

Mark Stahl was the only driver to fail to qualify.

=== Full qualifying results ===
Pos.	#	Driver	Team	Make	Time	Speed
1	11	Geoff Bodine	Junior Johnson & Associates	Ford	30.367	161.939
2	22	Sterling Marlin	Junior Johnson & Associates	Ford	30.528	161.085
3	4	Ernie Irvan	Morgan–McClure Motorsports	Chevrolet	30.539	161.027
4	25	Ken Schrader	Hendrick Motorsports	Chevrolet	30.558	160.927
5	33	Harry Gant	Leo Jackson Motorsports	Oldsmobile	30.609	160.659
6	7	Alan Kulwicki	AK Racing	Ford	30.650	160.444
7	3	Dale Earnhardt	Richard Childress Racing	Chevrolet	30.688	160.245
8	26	Brett Bodine	King Racing	Buick	30.730	160.026
9	17	Darrell Waltrip	Darrell Waltrip Motorsports	Chevrolet	30.731	160.021
10	30	Michael Waltrip	Bahari Racing	Pontiac	30.801	159.657
11	28	Davey Allison	Robert Yates Racing	Ford	30.802	159.652
12	6	Mark Martin	Roush Racing	Ford	30.821	159.554
13	5	Ricky Rudd	Hendrick Motorsports	Chevrolet	30.949	158.894
14	21	Dale Jarrett	Wood Brothers Racing	Ford	30.962	158.827
15	42	Kyle Petty	SABCO Racing	Pontiac	31.002	158.622
16	1	Rick Mast	Precision Products Racing	Oldsmobile	31.006	158.602
17	9	Bill Elliott	Melling Racing	Ford	31.030	158.479
18	8	Rick Wilson	Stavola Brothers Racing	Buick	31.031	158.474
19	12	Hut Stricklin	Bobby Allison Motorsports	Buick	31.073	158.260
20	10	Derrike Cope	Whitcomb Racing	Chevrolet	31.101	158.117
Failed to lock in Round 1
21	2	Rusty Wallace	Penske Racing South	Pontiac	30.862	159.342
22	66	Lake Speed	Cale Yarborough Motorsports	Pontiac	30.866	159.321
23	15	Morgan Shepherd	Bud Moore Engineering	Ford	31.102	158.112
24	24	Mickey Gibbs	Team III Racing	Pontiac	31.107	158.087
25	98	Jimmy Spencer	Travis Carter Enterprises	Chevrolet	31.156	157.838
26	65	Dave Mader III	Bahre Racing	Pontiac	31.193	157.651
27	94	Terry Labonte	Hagan Racing	Oldsmobile	31.198	157.625
28	20	Bobby Hillin Jr.	Moroso Racing	Oldsmobile	31.278	157.222
29	55	Ted Musgrave (R)	RaDiUs Motorsports	Pontiac	31.359	156.816
30	43	Richard Petty	Petty Enterprises	Pontiac	31.421	156.507
31	19	Chad Little	Little Racing	Ford	31.470	156.263
32	75	Joe Ruttman	RahMoc Enterprises	Oldsmobile	31.515	156.040
33	71	Dave Marcis	Marcis Auto Racing	Chevrolet	31.581	155.714
34	68	Bobby Hamilton (R)	TriStar Motorsports	Oldsmobile	31.747	154.900
35	47	Rich Bickle	Close Racing	Oldsmobile	31.747	154.900
36	52	Jimmy Means	Jimmy Means Racing	Pontiac	31.910	154.108
37	87	Randy Baker	Buck Baker Racing	Chevrolet	31.932	154.002
38	05	Bill Meacham	Meacham Racing	Oldsmobile	32.021	153.574
39	36	H. B. Bailey	Bailey Racing	Pontiac	32.528	151.181
40	70	J. D. McDuffie	McDuffie Racing	Pontiac	32.782	150.009
Failed to qualify
41	82	Mark Stahl	Stahl Racing	Ford	32.839	149.749
Official first round qualifying results
Official starting lineup

== Race results ==
Fin	St	#	Driver	Team	Make	Laps	Led	Status	Pts	Winnings
1	13	5	Ricky Rudd	Hendrick Motorsports	Chevrolet	367	69	running	180	$62,185
2	11	28	Davey Allison	Robert Yates Racing	Ford	367	31	running	175	$38,860
3	10	30	Michael Waltrip	Bahari Racing	Pontiac	367	208	running	175	$20,320
4	12	6	Mark Martin	Roush Racing	Ford	366	0	running	160	$22,710
5	21	2	Rusty Wallace	Penske Racing South	Pontiac	365	0	running	155	$10,260
6	15	42	Kyle Petty	SABCO Racing	Pontiac	365	0	running	150	$16,330
7	3	4	Ernie Irvan	Morgan–McClure Motorsports	Chevrolet	365	0	running	146	$15,025
8	23	15	Morgan Shepherd	Bud Moore Engineering	Ford	365	1	running	147	$14,320
9	1	11	Geoff Bodine	Junior Johnson & Associates	Ford	365	0	running	138	$18,400
10	2	22	Sterling Marlin	Junior Johnson & Associates	Ford	365	45	running	139	$12,060
11	25	98	Jimmy Spencer	Travis Carter Enterprises	Chevrolet	365	0	running	130	$10,505
12	17	9	Bill Elliott	Melling Racing	Ford	365	0	running	127	$13,675
13	16	1	Rick Mast	Precision Products Racing	Oldsmobile	364	0	running	124	$9,695
14	18	8	Rick Wilson	Stavola Brothers Racing	Buick	364	0	running	121	$9,390
15	27	94	Terry Labonte	Hagan Racing	Oldsmobile	364	0	running	118	$9,735
16	8	26	Brett Bodine	King Racing	Buick	363	0	running	115	$8,815
17	28	20	Bobby Hillin Jr.	Moroso Racing	Oldsmobile	361	0	running	112	$6,560
18	33	71	Dave Marcis	Marcis Auto Racing	Chevrolet	361	0	running	109	$8,225
19	4	25	Ken Schrader	Hendrick Motorsports	Chevrolet	361	5	running	111	$7,790
20	34	68	Bobby Hamilton (R)	TriStar Motorsports	Oldsmobile	360	0	running	103	$6,560
21	29	55	Ted Musgrave (R)	RaDiUs Motorsports	Pontiac	359	0	running	100	$5,540
22	24	24	Mickey Gibbs	Team III Racing	Pontiac	359	0	running	97	$4,070
23	36	52	Jimmy Means	Jimmy Means Racing	Pontiac	358	0	running	94	$4,950
24	35	47	Rich Bickle	Close Racing	Oldsmobile	356	0	running	91	$3,830
25	9	17	Darrell Waltrip	Darrell Waltrip Motorsports	Chevrolet	356	0	running	88	$3,810
26	32	75	Joe Ruttman	RahMoc Enterprises	Oldsmobile	355	0	running	85	$6,545
27	5	33	Harry Gant	Leo Jackson Motorsports	Oldsmobile	347	0	running	82	$6,380
28	37	87	Randy Baker	Buck Baker Racing	Chevrolet	346	0	running	79	$3,470
29	7	3	Dale Earnhardt	Richard Childress Racing	Chevrolet	332	0	engine	76	$14,310
30	40	70	J. D. McDuffie	McDuffie Racing	Pontiac	282	0	running	73	$3,325
31	20	10	Derrike Cope	Whitcomb Racing	Chevrolet	279	0	oil leak	70	$11,665
32	19	12	Hut Stricklin	Bobby Allison Motorsports	Buick	259	8	vibration	72	$5,980
33	26	65	Dave Mader III	Bahre Racing	Pontiac	197	0	fatigue	64	$3,170
34	6	7	Alan Kulwicki	AK Racing	Ford	186	0	crash	61	$11,135
35	39	36	H. B. Bailey	Bailey Racing	Pontiac	172	0	handling	58	$3,100
36	31	19	Chad Little	Little Racing	Ford	70	0	crash	55	$3,065
37	30	43	Richard Petty	Petty Enterprises	Pontiac	52	0	engine	52	$5,750
38	38	05	Bill Meacham	Meacham Racing	Oldsmobile	31	0	flagged	49	$3,010
39	14	21	Dale Jarrett	Wood Brothers Racing	Ford	30	0	crash	46	$5,670
40	22	66	Lake Speed	Cale Yarborough Motorsports	Pontiac	10	0	engine	43	$5,650
Official race results

== Standings after the race ==
Drivers' Championship standings

	Pos	Driver	Points
1	1	Ricky Rudd	808
1	2	Dale Earnhardt	728 (-80)
2	3	Ernie Irvan	679 (-129)
	4	Ken Schrader	670 (–138)
2	5	Sterling Marlin	667 (–141)
5	6	Mark Martin	648 (–160)
2	7	Morgan Shepherd	644 (–164)
6	8	Michael Waltrip	642 (–166)
4	9	Rusty Wallace	625 (–183)
7	10	Alan Kulwicki	622 (–186)
Official driver's standings

- Note: Only the first 10 positions are included for the driver standings.

Previous race: 1991 Motorcraft Quality Parts 500	NASCAR Winston Cup Series; 1991 season	Next race: 1991 Valleydale Meats 500
