= Jerry Hill (racing driver) =

American racing driver

- Born: July 25, 1961 (age 65); Brandywine, Maryland, U.S.

NASCAR Cup Series career
- 8 races run over 4 years
- Best finish: 51st (1992)
- First race: 1991 Peak AntiFreeze 500 (Dover)
- Last race: 1993 AC Delco 500 (Rockingham)
Wins	Top tens	Poles
0	0	0

NASCAR O'Reilly Auto Parts Series career
- 2 races run over 1 year
- Best finish: 95th (2004)
- First race: 2004 Charter 250 (Gateway)
- Last race: 2004 Winn-Dixie 250 presented by PepsiCo (Daytona)
Wins	Top tens	Poles
0	0	0

NASCAR FedEx Freight Truck Series career
- 58 races run over 4 years
- Best finish: 18th (2003)
- First race: 2001 Darlington 200 (Darlington)
- Last race: 2004 MBNA America 200 (Dover)
Wins	Top tens	Poles
0	0	0

Jerry Hill (born July 25, 1961) is an American former stock car racing driver and father of current NASCAR Craftsman Truck Series driver Timmy Hill and former NASCAR Craftsman Truck Series driver Tyler Hill. He was born in Brandywine, Maryland. He was a fixture on the Craftsman Truck Series for years, but has competed on all levels of NASCAR.

== Winston Cup Series ==
Hill made his debut in 1991, running the No. 56 Hill Motorsports Pontiac that he would drive throughout his Cup career. In his debut at Dover, Hill started and finished 38th after vibration problems, only completing 39 laps. In his second start at Rockingham, Hill managed to improve on qualifying, but finished 38th just the same after being flagged.

Hill ran four races for the team in 1992. He managed his best finish of the year of 27th at Rockingham, the only race he finished. He also improved on qualifying in 1992, earning a career best of 36th at Dover.

Hill ran two races in 1993, his last Cup starts. They both came at Rockingham, they were both 38th place finishes and they were both DNFs. So, with the dismal results, Hill left the Cup Series.

== Busch Series ==
Hill competed in two Busch Series races. They came in 2004, running for MacDonald Motorsports. Hill started fortieth at Gateway in his debut, but managed to finish the race in 26th. Then, at Daytona, Hill started 24th and finished 22nd, thus completing a respectable run in that series.

== Craftsman Truck Series ==
Hill spent the majority of his career in this series, making 58 starts. However, he never finished on the lead lap. He made his debut in 2001 at Darlington, starting 36th and finishing 26th. Hill finished 27th at Dover and then seventeenth at Kentucky, before switching over to MacDonald Motorsports CTS program for two races, the better being a 24th at IRP. Hill then finished out the season at Troxell Racing. He earned two top-twenty finishes for that team: a seventeenth at Texas and an eighteenth at Chicago Motor. Despite all the swapping, Hill managed 25th in points.

Hill made all but one race in the 2002 season. He drove the No. 79 RDS Motorsports Dodge throughout the entire season. The low-budget team struggled, but hung around. Their best finish were a triple of eighteenths at Texas, Dover and Darlington. However, Hill ran consistently, recording nine top-twenty finishes and finishing all but three races. The decent season allowed Hill to finish 23rd in points.

Hill moved to Ware Racing Enterprises for 2003, competing the majority of the schedule en route to an eighteenth-place finish in points. Oddly, despite the career best points finish, Hill only finished in the top-twenty five times, and only once above twentieth. His best finish was eighteenth at Kansas. Hill's main issue was the inability to finish races. Unlike in 2002, Hill only finished twelve of his twenty-two starts, and that inconsistency weighed his team down.

Hill ran two races in 2004, both for MacDonald Motorsports while he was doing their Busch runs. He was 26th at Atlanta and 32nd at Dover. The lackluster runs did not earn Hill another ride in the series, and he has not raced in major NASCAR since.

== Motorsports career results ==
=== NASCAR ===
(key) (Bold – Pole position awarded by qualifying time. Italics – Pole position earned by points standings or practice time. * – Most laps led.)

==== Winston Cup Series ====
NASCAR Winston Cup Series results
Year	Team	No.	Make	1	2	3	4	5	6	7	8	9	10	11	12	13	14	15	16	17	18	19	20	21	22	23	24	25	26	27	28	29	30	31	NWCC	Pts	Ref
1991	Hill Motorsports	56	Pontiac	DAY	RCH	CAR	ATL	DAR	BRI	NWS	MAR	TAL	CLT	DOV	SON	POC	MCH	DAY	POC	TAL	GLN	MCH	BRI	DAR	RCH	DOV; 38	MAR	NWS	CLT	CAR; 38	PHO	ATL			72nd	98	
1992	Hill Motorsports	56	Pontiac	DAY	CAR; 27	RCH	ATL	DAR; 35	BRI	NWS	MAR	TAL	CLT	DOV; 38	SON	POC; 38	MCH	DAY	POC	TAL	GLN	MCH	BRI	DAR	RCH	DOV	MAR	NWS	CLT	CAR	PHO	ATL			51st	238	
1993	Hill Motorsports	56	Chevy	DAY	CAR; 38	RCH	ATL	DAR	BRI	NWS	MAR	TAL	SON	CLT	DOV; DNQ	POC	MCH	DAY	NHA	POC; DNQ	TAL	GLN	MCH	BRI	DAR; DNQ	RCH	DOV	MAR	NWS	CLT	CAR; 38	PHO	ATL		67th	98	
1994	Hill Motorsports	56	Chevy	DAY; DNQ	CAR; DNQ	RCH	ATL	DAR	BRI	NWS	MAR	TAL	SON	CLT	DOV	POC	MCH	DAY	NHA	POC	TAL	IND; DNQ	GLN	MCH	BRI	DAR	RCH	DOV	MAR	NWS	CLT	CAR	PHO	ATL	NA	-	

===== Daytona 500 =====
Year	Team	Manufacturer	Start	Finish
1994	Hill Motorsports	Chevrolet	DNQ	

==== Busch Series ====
NASCAR Busch Series results
Year	Team	No.	Make	1	2	3	4	5	6	7	8	9	10	11	12	13	14	15	16	17	18	19	20	21	22	23	24	25	26	27	28	29	30	31	32	33	34	NBSC	Pts	Ref
2004	MacDonald Motorsports	72	Chevy	DAY	CAR	LVS	DAR	BRI	TEX	NSH	TAL	CAL	GTY; 26	RCH	NZH	CLT					DAY; 22	CHI	NHA	PPR	IRP	MCH	BRI	CAL	RCH	DOV	KAN	CLT	MEM	ATL	PHO	DAR	HOM	95th	182	
2004	Ware Racing Enterprises	51	Chevy														DOV; QL^{†}	NSH	KEN	MLW																		95th	182	
^{†} - Qualified for Stan Boyd

==== Craftsman Truck Series ====
NASCAR Craftsman Truck Series results
Year	Team	No.	Make	1	2	3	4	5	6	7	8	9	10	11	12	13	14	15	16	17	18	19	20	21	22	23	24	25	NCTC	Pts	Ref
2001	Hill Motorsports	41	Ford	DAY	HOM	MMR	MAR	GTY	DAR; 26	PPR	DOV; 27	TEX	MEM	MLW	KAN	KEN; 17													25th	1214	
2001	MacDonald Motorsports	72	Chevy														NHA; 28	IRP; 24											25th	1214	
2001	Troxell Racing	93	Chevy																NSH; 28	CIC; 18	NZH; 26	RCH; 29	SBO; 21	TEX; 17	LVS; 32	PHO; DNQ			25th	1214	
2001	Hill Motorsports	47	Chevy																								CAL; 21		25th	1214	
2002	Hill Motorsports	41	Dodge	DAY; DNQ																									23rd	1992	
2002	RDS Racing	79	Dodge		DAR; 18	MAR; 22	GTY; 34	PPR; 23	DOV; 18	TEX; 20	MEM; 25	MLW; 21	KAN; 19	KEN; 20	NHA; 20	MCH; 21	IRP; 22	NSH; 29	RCH; 35	TEX; 18	SBO; 19	LVS; 24	CAL; 19	PHO; 25	HOM; 25				23rd	1992	
2003	Ware Racing Enterprises	5	Dodge	DAY; 35	DAR; 20	MMR; 24	MAR; 32	CLT; 28	DOV; 31	TEX; 21	MEM; 20	MLW; 23	KAN; 18	KEN; 33	GTW; 29	MCH; 20	IRP; 27	NSH; 29	BRI; 34	RCH; 23	NHA; 21	CAL; 27	LVS; 25	SBO; 28	TEX; 20				18th	1882	
2003	Ware Racing Enterprises	51	Dodge																							MAR; DNQ	PHO	HOM	18th	1882	
2004	MacDonald Motorsports	72	Chevy	DAY	ATL; 26	MAR	MFD	CLT	DOV; 32	TEX	MEM	MLW	KAN	KEN	GTW	MCH	IRP	NSH	BRI	RCH	NHA	LVS	CAL	TEX	MAR	PHO	DAR	HOM	73rd	152	
