= Mike Wallace (racing driver) =

American racing driver (born 1959)

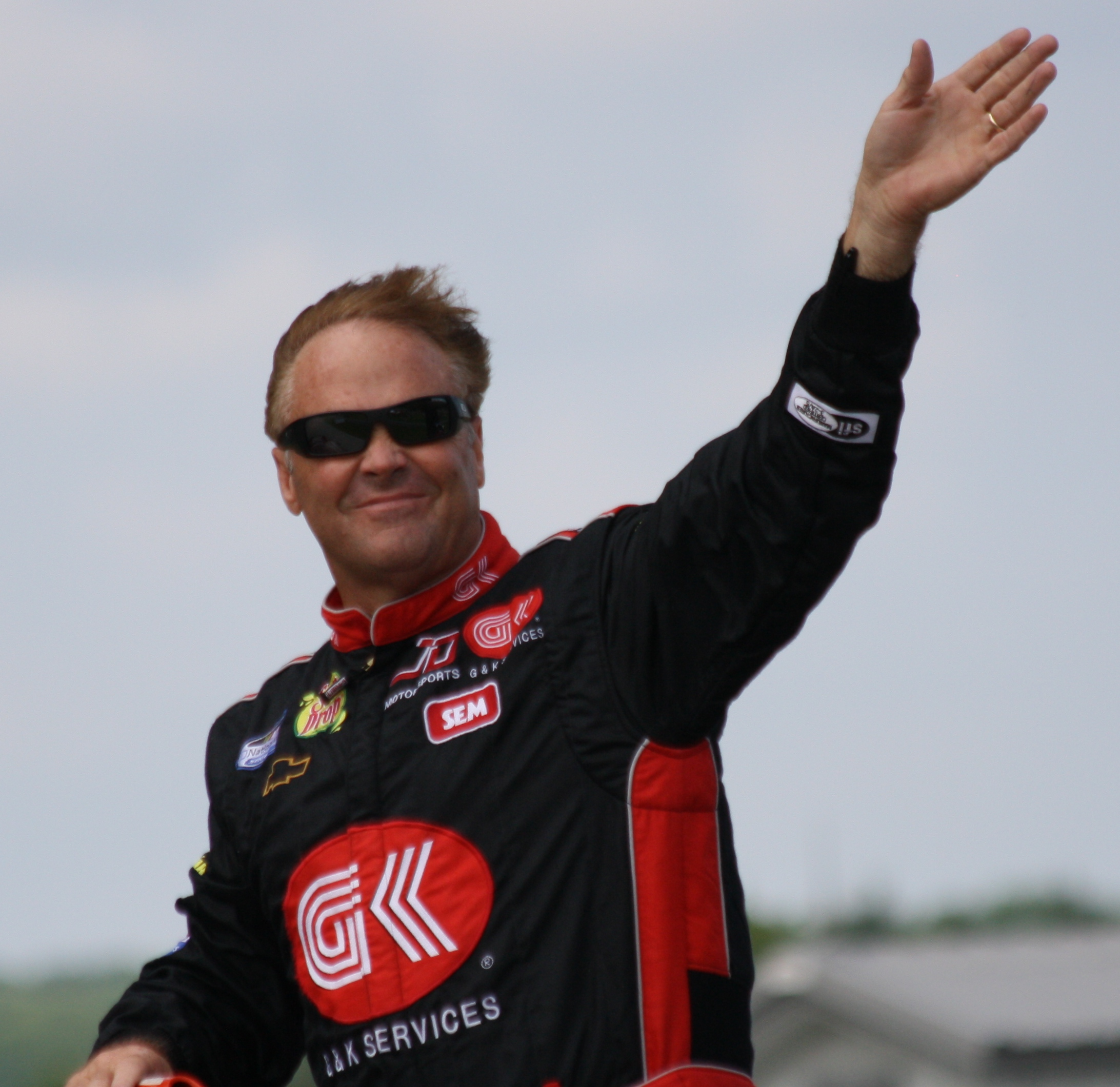
- Wallace at Road America in 2013
- Born: Michael Samuel Wallace; March 10, 1959 (age 67); Fenton, Missouri, U.S.
- Achievements: 1990 NASCAR Winston Racing Series Mid-America Regional Champion; 2000 Inaugural winner of the NASCAR Craftsman Truck Series at Daytona International Speedway

NASCAR Cup Series career
- 197 races run over 19 years
- 2015 position: 47th
- Best finish: 33rd (1994)
- First race: 1991 Pyroil 500 (Phoenix)
- Last race: 2015 Daytona 500 (Daytona)
Wins	Top tens	Poles
0	14	0

NASCAR O'Reilly Auto Parts Series career
- 497 races run over 27 years
- 2020 position: 55th
- Best finish: 8th (2008)
- First race: 1990 Winston Classic (Martinsville)
- Last race: 2020 UNOH 188 (Daytona RC)
- First win: 1994 GM Goodwrench/Delco 200 (Dover)
- Last win: 2004 Winn-Dixie 250 (Daytona)
Wins	Top tens	Poles
4	66	0

NASCAR FedEx Freight Truck Series career
- 115 races run over 14 years
- 2011 position: 87th
- Best finish: 4th (2000)
- First race: 1995 Lowe's 150 (North Wilkesboro)
- Last race: 2011 Coca-Cola 250 (Talladega)
- First win: 1999 Florida Dodge Dealers 400 (Homestead)
- Last win: 2011 Coca-Cola 250 (Talladega)
Wins	Top tens	Poles
5	56	3
- Statistics up to date as of November 9, 2020.

Michael Samuel Wallace (born March 10, 1959) is an American professional stock car racing driver born in Fenton, Missouri. He is the younger brother of Rusty Wallace, the older brother of Kenny Wallace, and the uncle of Steve Wallace. His daughter, Chrissy Wallace, and son, Matt Wallace, have also competed in racing.

== Early life ==
Michael Wallace was born on March 10, 1959 to his parents Russ Sr. and Judy Wallace. He was the middle child of 3 brothers Rusty and Kenny. Wallace’s father was also a prolific race winner himself, Wallace and his two brothers grew up around the race track and would often serve as a member of their father’s pit crew.

== Racing career ==
=== Early years ===
Wallace first began racing in the 1970s making a name for himself on dirt tracks. Just like his brother Rusty, he eventually moved on to short track racing in the Midwest where he racked up over 300 victories.

=== Early NASCAR career ===
Wallace made his Busch Series debut in 1990 at the season-closing Winston Classic at Martinsville Speedway. Starting 24th, Wallace finished sixth in the No. 40 Lowes Foods Chevrolet. The next season, he ran nine Busch races for a variety of different teams and had a third-place finish at Lanier Raceway. He also made his Winston Cup debut at the Pyroil 500, where he finished 31st in the Jimmy Means-owned car. It also marked the first time since the 1950s that three brothers competed against each other in a Winston Cup race, as Rusty and Kenny drove in that race also.

In 1992, Wallace signed on with Moroso Racing to pilot the No. 20 First Ade Oldsmobile. They also ran a Cup race together at Atlanta Motor Speedway, where Wallace finished 33rd. Despite a tenth-place run at Martinsville, Wallace was dismissed from the ride nearly halfway into the season. Late in the year, he was hired by Barry Owen to drive his No. 9 Oldsmobile, replacing the late Clifford Allison. After a ninth place finish in their first race at Dover International Speedway, Wallace posted a second place finish at Martinsville. Wallace and Owen also ran a pair of Cup races, and their best finish was in twentieth place in Atlanta. They ran the entire Busch schedule in 1993, with sponsorship from FDP Brakes. Wallace had nine top-tens that season and finished a career-high twelfth in the final points standings. He also finished in the top-fifteen for the first time in his Cup career when he finished fifteenth at Atlanta.

=== 1994–1997 ===
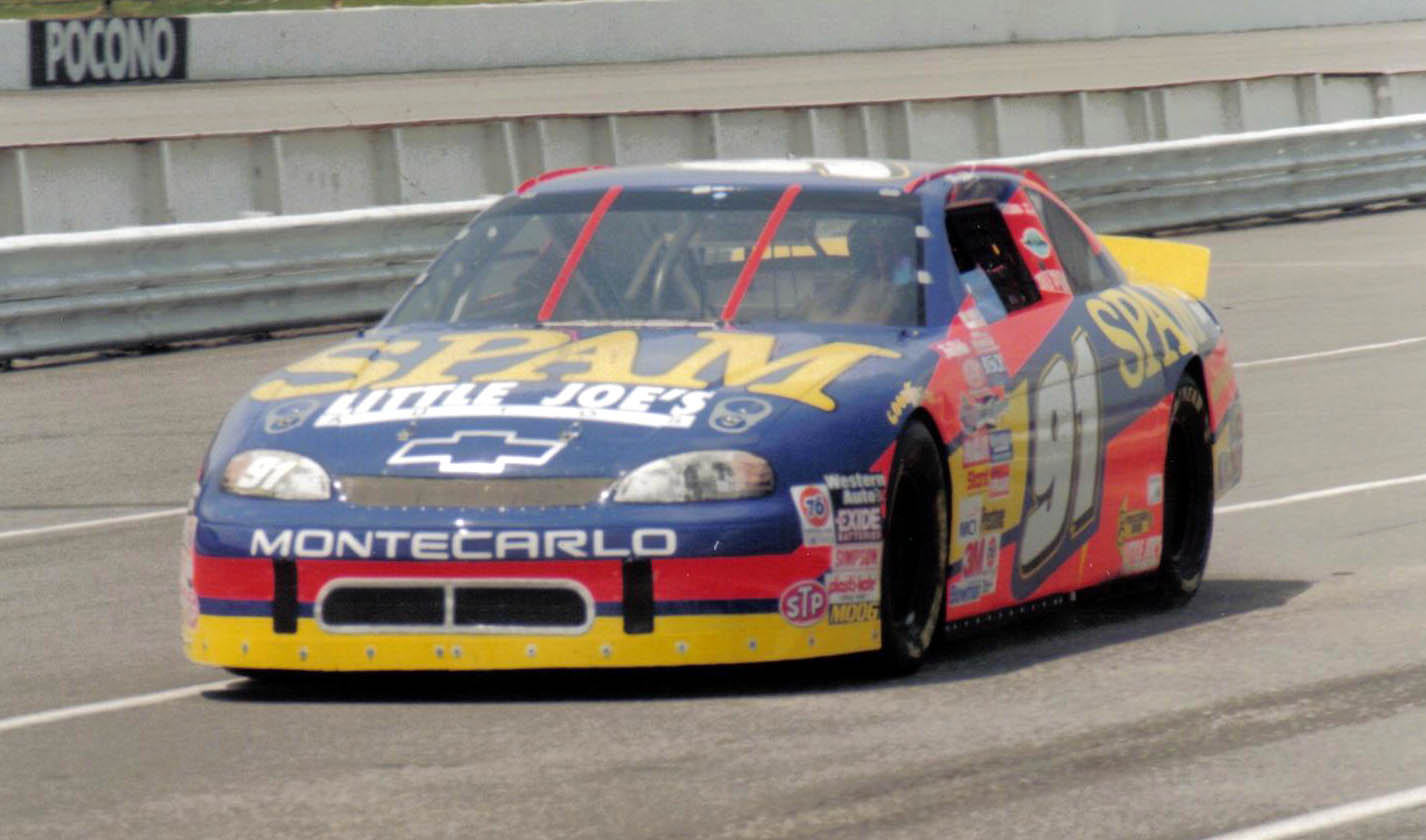
Wallace in 1997

Early in 1994, Wallace was hired by Junie Donlavey to drive his No. 90 Heilig-Meyers Ford Thunderbird in the Winston Cup Series. Although he competed in 22 of the scheduled 31 races that year, Wallace finished fifth in the Rookie of the Year standings and 33rd in the final point standings. His season was capped off with a fifth place finish at the Hooters 500. In the Busch Series, he won his first career race at Dover, followed by victories at The Milwaukee Mile and Indianapolis Raceway Park. The following season, Wallace failed to qualify for five races in the Cup series and dropped a spot in the standings. His lone lead-lap finish came at Bristol Motor Speedway, where he finished ninth. In the Busch Series, his team switched to No. 90 with sponsorship from Duron Paints and posted two second-place finishes. He also made his Craftsman Truck Series debut that season at North Wilkesboro Speedway and finished 29th in the MB Motorsports truck.

Twelve races into the 1996 season, Wallace was released from his Cup ride with Donlavey. Despite moving back down into the Busch Series full-time, Wallace only posted one top-ten in the second half of the season, forcing Owen's team to close its doors. Wallace began 1997 with high hopes in the No. 91 LJ Racing Chevrolet Monte Carlo owned by Joe Falk and Ron Neal. The team had moved up from the Busch Series and signed Spam as a full-time sponsor but after many DNQs and the best finish of seventeenth at Texas Motor Speedway, the team lost its sponsor and Wallace found himself without a ride. He also split time in the Busch Series in the No. 7 Chevrolet for Ed Whitaker, making six starts. Midway through the season, he left for the Truck Series, driving the No. 52 Purolator Chevrolet Silverado for Ken Schrader Racing. Despite only running fifteen races that season, he finished 23rd in points. He also finished in the top-ten in each of the last four races of the season, including California Speedway, where he finished second.

=== 1998–2004 ===
Wallace returned to run the Truck Series full-time in 1998 for Schrader. Although he did not win that season, he won his first career NASCAR pole at New Hampshire International Speedway and had seven top-tens en route to a fifteenth place point finish. He also ran six Busch races for Andy Petree Racing, Washington-Erving Motorsports, and the Curb Agajanian Performance Group, his best finish coming at IRP for Petree. In addition, he ran the Daytona 500 in an entry for Phil Barkdoll, starting and finishing 23rd.

In 1999, Wallace left Schrader to drive the No. 2 Team ASE Racing Ford F-150 for Ultra Motorsports. He won in his first race for Ultra at Homestead-Miami Speedway and won again six races later at Pikes Peak International Raceway. He finished sixth in points that year. He also returned to Donlavey in Cup to run the Daytona 500 for him and finished 23rd, as well finishing 24th in an Ultra-owned car at Richmond International Raceway. The following year, Wallace won an additional two truck races and moved up to fourth in points. He also ran eight Busch races for Moy Racing, his best finish a fourteenth at IRP.

Ultra promoted Wallace back to the Cup Series for 2001 after Michael Waltrip left the team to drive for Dale Earnhardt, Inc., placing him in the No. 7 Nations Rent Ford. Despite starting off the season with a sixth place finish at the Daytona 500, the team struggled in qualifying. Wallace did not qualify for the Coca-Cola 600 or the spring race at Michigan and was pulled from the ride for Ted Musgrave at Pocono in June and Robby Gordon the next week at Sonoma. Despite recording another top-ten at Daytona in the Pepsi 400 and one more at New Hampshire, he failed to qualify again at Indianapolis and Watkins Glen.

During that time, he began running with a new Busch Series team, Biagi Brothers Racing, running their No. 4 Geico Chevy. His best finish of eight starts was a tenth at Richmond International Raceway.

After the inaugural race at Kansas in the fall, Wallace left Ultra and joined Penske-Kranefuss Racing, driving the No. 12 Mobil 1 Ford Taurus as a teammate to his brother Rusty after Jeremy Mayfield was fired. At Phoenix, he led 45 laps late in the race before giving the lead up to Jeff Burton, finishing a career-best second. Wallace recorded four top-twenty finishes in the No. 12, but after the season Roger Penske and Michael Kranefuss elected to dissolve their partnership. Although Penske would continue to run two teams, as rookie Ryan Newman would be promoted to full-time for 2002, he would be doing so under his own team and thus Wallace was left without a ride when the partnership dissolved.

Andy Petree brought Wallace in to run a few races in his No. 33 Chevrolet as a replacement for Joe Nemechek, who had left to join Haas-Carter Motorsports. The team did not have sponsorship; however, since Oakwood Homes left the team at the end of 2001, Wallace did not run the full season. However, by virtue of Nemechek’s victory in the fall race at Rockingham the year before, Wallace qualified to race in The Winston all-star race at Charlotte in the No. 33; he finished 23rd.

Wallace returned to run with Biagi for seventeen races in the Busch Series, posting two consecutive fourteenth place finishes. Wallace also returned to the Truck series driving the Federated Auto Parts truck for Schrader, posting two Top 10’s. Mid-season, he signed onto the No. 14 Conseco Pontiac Grand Prix for A. J. Foyt Racing, his best finish a tenth at Bristol.

In 2003, Biagi Bros. began racing full-time in the Busch Series with Wallace. Despite missing two races, Wallace had three top-tens and finished thirteenth in the final standings. In the Cup series, he had two Top 10’s driving for Phoenix, as well as making eight starts filling for Jerry Nadeau in the No. 01 U.S. Army Pontiac Grand Prix for MB2/MBV Motorsports. In addition to running two races for Schrader in the Truck Series, he also competed in a pair of events for Brevak Racing, his best finish a fifteenth at Phoenix. In 2004, at the mid-season race at Daytona, Wallace took the lead on the last lap and won his fourth career race, the first for Biagi in one of the biggest wins of his career. The following week at Chicagoland Speedway, he led eighteen laps and almost won before running out of fuel on the final lap. In the Cup Series, he drove three races for Arnold Motorsports, before leading 45 laps and finishing seventh at Richmond for Phoenix. He finished the season driving the No. 4 Lucas Oil Chevy for Morgan-McClure Motorsports.

=== 2005–present ===
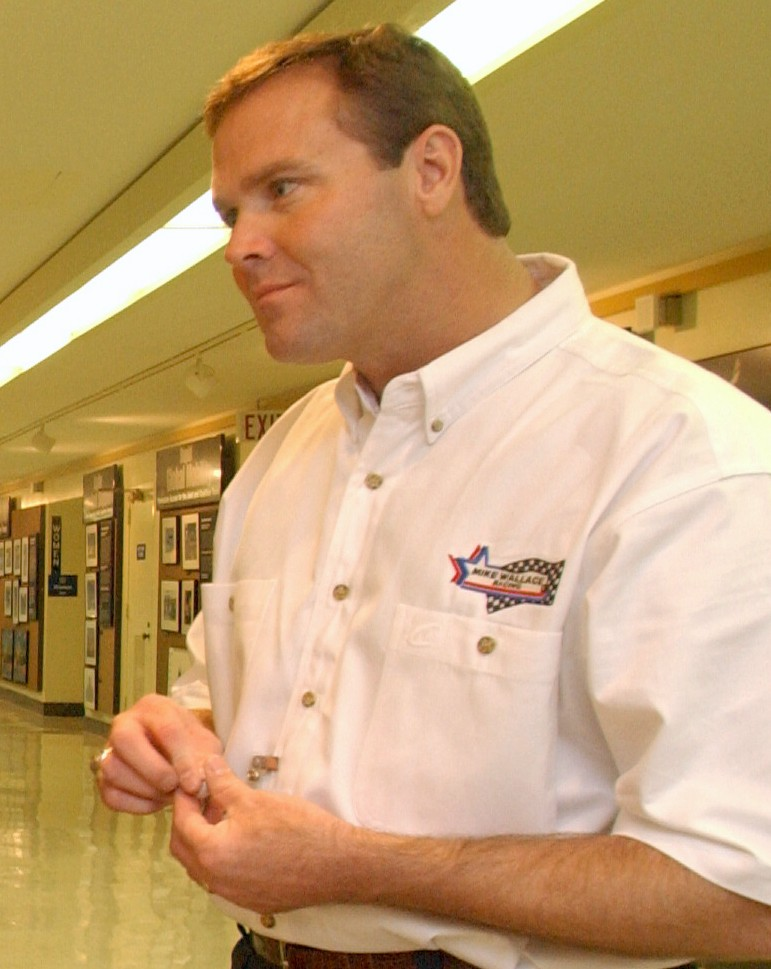
Wallace at the Pentagon

Wallace began driving for MMM full-time in 2005. Despite an eighth place finish at the Pepsi 400, Wallace was released towards the end of the season by MMM. He returned to the Truck Series briefly for Darrell Waltrip Motorsports, finishing in the top-nine twice. He drove for a variety of different teams in the Busch Series, among them Akins Motorsports, Rusty Wallace, Inc. and Evernham Motorsports, with whom he finished second at his hometown track in Gateway.

Wallace began 2006 in the Truck Series running for HT Motorsports but was released after finishing 31st in each of his first two starts. Already signed on to run Phoenix's Cup car, Miccosukee Resorts Dodge signed Wallace to be their full-time driver for the remainder of 2006 to replace Jason Keller and had three top-five finishes. In 2007, Wallace piloted the No. 7 GEICO Chevrolet for Phoenix Racing with teammate J. J. Yeley. Despite no top-ten finishes, he ended the season eleventh in points.

Wallace finished 4th in the 2007 Daytona 500, his best finish in the event.

In 2008, Wallace, GEICO, and his car number moved from Phoenix Racing to Germain Racing, where he drove a Toyota Camry. He had eight top-tens and finished a career-best eighth in points. After he had not renewed his contract with Germain, Wallace attempted the 2009 Daytona 500 for Kevin Buckler but failed to make the race by just one position in his Gatorade Duel qualifying race. In June 2009, Larry Gunselman tapped Wallace for a ride in his No. 64 Toyota to compete in Pocono just days after Todd Bodine left the team. On October 31, 2009, in the Mountain Dew 250, he raced the No. 48 for Fast Track Racing Enterprises in the Camping World Truck Series along with his daughter Chrissy Wallace. It was the first time that a father and daughter raced in the same race. Wallace finished 28th after an accident and Chrissy finished thirteenth. He also signed on as a full-time driver of the No. 01 JD Motorsports in the Nationwide Series.

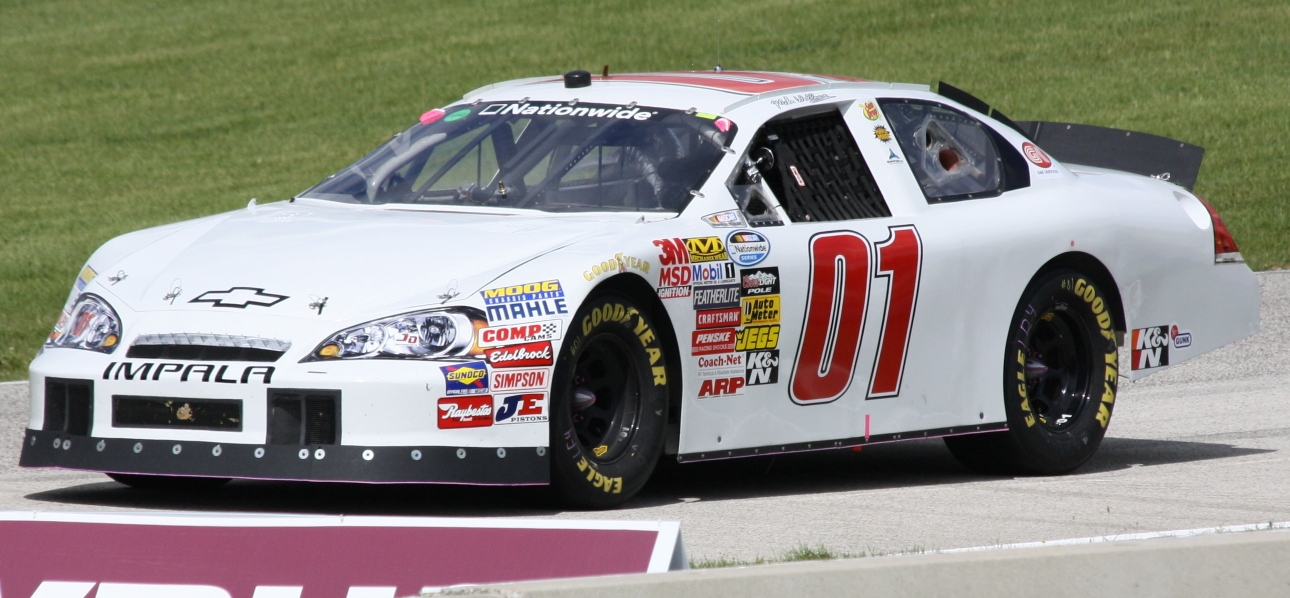
Wallace's Nationwide car in 2010

Wallace led late in the 2011 Aaron's 312 but flipped in a multi-car accident. Wallace drove the car back to pit road and was credited with an eighteenth place finish. Near the end of the 2011 season, Wallace won the NCWTS Coca-Cola 250 at Talladega Superspeedway after being pushed by Ron Hornaday for the majority of the race.

Wallace attempted to qualify for the 2012 Daytona 500 in the No. 37 Ford, fielded by Max Q Motorsports and Rick Ware Racing, but failed to qualify for the race.

Wallace drove for JD Motorsports in the Nationwide Series full-time during the 2013 season.

In 2014, Wallace drove part-time for JGL Racing in the Nationwide Series. He also returned to Sprint Cup, driving for Identity Ventures Racing in several late-season Cup events, with a best finish of 26th.

Wallace began 2015 driving for Premium Motorsports in the No. 66 Sprint Cup car. He began the season by finishing 36th in the Daytona 500, however, after failing to qualify for the next two races he was released. Wallace then had triple-bypass heart surgery in April, keeping him out of racing for the summer.

Five years after his last NASCAR national series start, Wallace returned to the Xfinity Series in July 2020 for the Pennzoil 150 on the Indianapolis Motor Speedway road course, racing for JD Motorsports. After starting fourteenth, his momentum was hindered at the start of the final stage when he stopped to avoid a spinning Brett Moffitt; Wallace finished 24th. He returned to JD at Road America and the Daytona road course in August. On September 10, Wallace was suspended indefinitely by NASCAR for violating the sport's behavioral policy over a social media post. NASCAR did not disclose what Wallace's social media post was the cause of his suspension. He filed two appeals; both of which were rejected by the National Motorsports Appeal Panel. He, alongside Josh Reaume, was reinstated on March 31, 2021.

On January 2, 2025, it was announced that Wallace would return to NASCAR to attempt the 2025 Daytona 500 driving the No. 66 for MBM Motorsports. A few days later, NASCAR deemed Wallace ineligible to compete in the race due to his inactivity in major professional motorsports, with his last superspeedway race at the 2015 Daytona 500 and NASCAR-sanctioned event in 2020. He was replaced by Chandler Smith for the event, who failed to qualify. On October 4, 2025, he made his debut in the Grand National Super Series, racing the No. 66 car at Dominion Raceway racing alongside his daughter Chrissy.

== Personal life ==
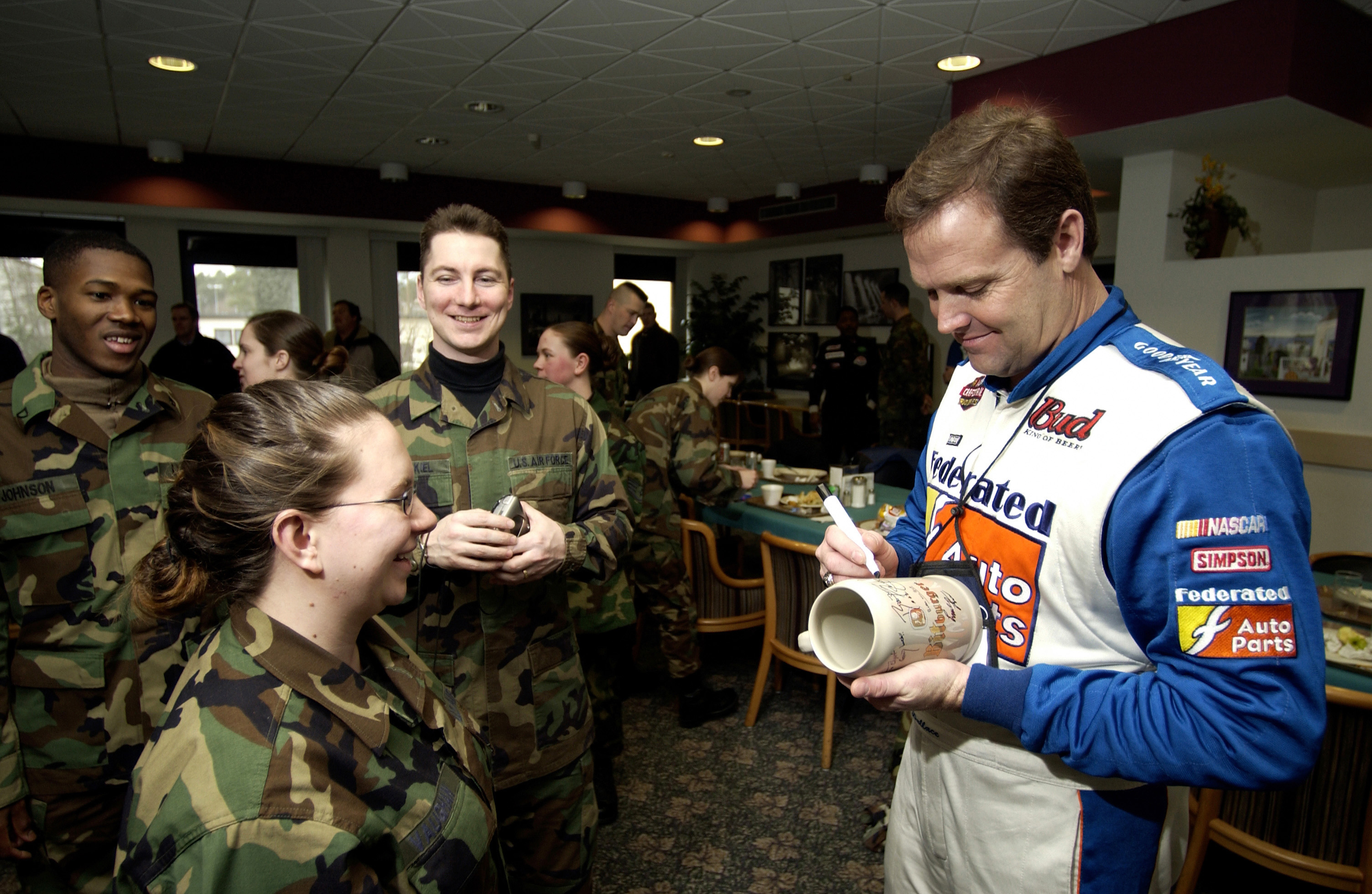
Wallace in 2003 signing autographs for US Air Force and Army service members during a luncheon at Ramstein Air Base (AB), Germany

Wallace was married to his wife Carla for 44 years, she died in 2024 due to ovarian cancer. They have two daughters Chrissy and Lyndsey, son Matt, and grandchild Thomas. Wallace’s daughter Chrissy and son Matt have also went on to compete in the NASCAR O'Reilly and Truck Series respectively. Outside of racing Wallace has taken part in multiple real estate ventures.

In 2024 Wallace founded the Carla Wallace Memorial Fund in his wife’s honor, the foundation supports B.R.A.K.E.S. a driving training organization for teens living in foster care and underprivileged communities.

== Motorsports career results ==
=== NASCAR ===
(key) (Bold – Pole position awarded by qualifying time. Italics – Pole position earned by points standings or practice time. * – Most laps led.)

==== Sprint Cup Series ====
NASCAR Sprint Cup Series results
Year	Team	No.	Make	1	2	3	4	5	6	7	8	9	10	11	12	13	14	15	16	17	18	19	20	21	22	23	24	25	26	27	28	29	30	31	32	33	34	35	36	NSCS	Pts	Ref
1991	Jimmy Means Racing	52	Pontiac	DAY	RCH	CAR	ATL	DAR	BRI	NWS	MAR	TAL	CLT	DOV	SON	POC	MCH	DAY	POC	TAL	GLN	MCH	BRI	DAR	RCH	DOV	MAR	NWS	CLT	CAR	PHO; 31	ATL; 39								62nd	116	
1992	Moroso Racing	20	Olds	DAY; DNQ	CAR	RCH	ATL; 33	DAR	BRI	NWS	MAR	TAL	CLT	DOV	SON	POC	MCH	DAY	POC	TAL	GLN	MCH	BRI	DAR	RCH	DOV	MAR	NWS	CLT											50th	249	
1992	Owen Racing	88	Ford																											CAR; 27	PHO	ATL; 20								50th	249	
1993	Owen Racing	66	Pontiac	DAY	CAR	RCH	ATL	DAR	BRI	NWS	MAR	TAL	SON	CLT; 22	DOV	POC	MCH	DAY	NHA	POC	TAL	GLN	MCH	BRI	DAR	RCH	DOV; DNQ	MAR	NWS				ATL; 15							46th	343	
1993	Jimmy Means Racing	52	Ford																											CLT; 30										46th	343	
1993	Owen Racing	66	Ford																												CAR; 36	PHO								46th	343	
1994	Owen Racing	66	Chevy	DAY	CAR	RCH; DNQ																																		33rd	2191	
1994	Donlavey Racing	90	Ford				ATL; 27	DAR; 18	BRI; 28	NWS; DNQ	MAR; DNQ	TAL; 15	SON; 23	CLT; 23	DOV; 13	POC; 36	MCH; DNQ	DAY; 12	NHA; 28	POC; 30	TAL; 13	IND; DNQ	GLN; DNQ	MCH; 16	BRI; 24	DAR; 17	RCH; 23	DOV; 29	MAR; 28	NWS; DNQ	CLT; 17	CAR; 16	PHO; 28	ATL; 5						33rd	2191	
1995	Donlavey Racing	90	Ford	DAY; 39	CAR; 15	RCH; 26	ATL; 40	DAR; 15	BRI; DNQ	NWS; 36	MAR; 27	TAL; 23	SON; 34	CLT; 12	DOV; 14	POC; 32	MCH; 32	DAY; 37	NHA; 32	POC; 26	TAL; 12	IND; 26	GLN; DNQ	MCH; 20	BRI; 8	DAR; 39	RCH; DNQ	DOV; 31	MAR; 17	NWS; DNQ	CLT; 23	CAR; 39	PHO; 36	ATL; DNQ						34th	2178	
1996	Donlavey Racing	90	Ford	DAY; 37	CAR; 17	RCH; 24	ATL; 33	DAR; 21	BRI; DNQ	NWS; DNQ	MAR; 32	TAL; 38	SON; 44	CLT; 39	DOV; 19	POC	MCH	DAY	NHA	POC	TAL	IND	GLN																	41st	799	
1996	TriStar Motorsports	19	Ford																					MCH; 29	BRI	DAR	RCH	DOV	MAR	NWS	CLT	CAR	PHO	ATL						41st	799	
1997	LJ Racing	91	Chevy	DAY; DNQ	CAR; DNQ	RCH; DNQ	ATL; 26	DAR; 43	TEX; 17	BRI; DNQ	MAR; 39	SON; 22	TAL; DNQ	CLT; DNQ	DOV; 23	POC; 30	MCH; DNQ	CAL; DNQ	DAY	NHA	POC																			46th	541	
1997	Precision Products Racing	1	Pontiac																			IND; DNQ	GLN	MCH	BRI	DAR	RCH	NHA	DOV	MAR	CLT	TAL	CAR	PHO	ATL					46th	541	
1998	Barkdoll Racing	73	Chevy	DAY; 23	CAR	LVS	ATL	DAR	BRI	TEX	MAR	TAL	CAL	CLT	DOV	RCH	MCH	POC	SON	NHA	POC	IND	GLN	MCH	BRI	NHA	DAR	RCH	DOV	MAR	CLT	TAL	DAY	PHO	CAR	ATL				62nd	94	
1999	Donlavey Racing	90	Ford	DAY; 23	CAR	LVS	ATL	DAR	TEX	BRI	MAR	TAL	CAL	RCH	CLT	DOV	MCH	POC	SON	DAY	NHA	POC																		53rd	185	
1999	Ultra Motorsports	32	Ford																				IND; DNQ	GLN	MCH	BRI	DAR	RCH; 24	NHA	DOV	MAR	CLT	TAL	CAR	PHO; DNQ	HOM	ATL			53rd	185	
2001	Ultra Motorsports	7	Ford	DAY; 6	CAR; 40	LVS; 32	ATL; 40	DAR; 32	BRI; 37	TEX; 24	MAR; 31	TAL; 9	CAL; 16	RCH; 25	CLT; DNQ	DOV; 28	MCH; DNQ	POC	SON	DAY; 10	CHI	NHA; 10	POC; 25	IND; DNQ	GLN; DNQ	MCH; 35	BRI; 31	DAR; 12	RCH; 42	DOV; 23	KAN; 19									34th	2693	
2001	Penske Racing	12	Ford																													CLT; 34	MAR; 8	TAL; 18	PHO; 2	CAR; 32	HOM; 26	ATL; 13	NHA; 33	34th	2693	
2002	Andy Petree Racing	33	Chevy	DAY; 21	CAR; 38	LVS	ATL	DAR	BRI	TEX	MAR	TAL; 42	CAL	RCH	CLT	DOV	POC	MCH	SON	DAY; 41																				41st	1551	
2002	MB2 Motorsports	10	Pontiac																		CHI; 38	NHA																		41st	1551	
2002	A. J. Foyt Racing	14	Pontiac																				POC; 39	IND; 43	GLN	MCH; 40	BRI; 10	DAR; 32	RCH; 12	NHA; 31	DOV; 28	KAN; 19	TAL; 35	CLT; 17	MAR; 27	ATL; 31	CAR; 43	PHO; 28	HOM; 11	41st	1551	
2003	Phoenix Racing	09	Dodge	DAY; 9	CAR	LVS	ATL	DAR	BRI	TEX	TAL; 30	MAR	CAL	RCH															RCH; 12	NHA	DOV	TAL; 10	KAN; 32	CLT	MAR	ATL; DNQ	PHO; 26	CAR	HOM; DNQ	42nd	1189	
2003	MB2 Motorsports	01	Pontiac												CLT; 31	DOV; 19	POC; 31	MCH; 23	SON	DAY; 42	CHI; 37	NHA; 42	POC; 23	IND	GLN	MCH	BRI	DAR												42nd	1189	
2004	Arnold Motorsports	50	Dodge	DAY	CAR	LVS	ATL	DAR	BRI	TEX	MAR	TAL	CAL	RCH	CLT	DOV; 35	POC	MCH	SON	DAY; 41	CHI	NHA; 32	POC	IND	GLN															46th	764	
2004	Gary Keller Racing	35	Chevy																							MCH; DNQ		CAL; DNQ					KAN; DNQ	CLT; DNQ	MAR					46th	764	
2004	Phoenix Racing	09	Dodge																								BRI; 28		RCH; 7	NHA; 34	DOV	TAL; 18								46th	764	
2004	Morgan-McClure Motorsports	4	Chevy																																	ATL; DNQ	PHO; 29	DAR; 38	HOM; 33	46th	764	
2005	Morgan-McClure Motorsports	4	Chevy	DAY; 41	CAL; 25	LVS; 24	ATL; 40	BRI; 34	MAR; 23	TEX; 25	PHO; 27	TAL; 28	DAR; 24	RCH; 29	CLT; 16	DOV; 28	POC; 31	MCH; 43	SON; QL^{†}	DAY; 8	CHI; 25	NHA; 38	POC; 29	IND; DNQ	GLN	MCH	BRI; 17	CAL	RCH; 14	NHA; 22	DOV; 22	TAL; 19	KAN; 35	CLT; 43	MAR; 35	ATL; DNQ	TEX; 36	PHO; DNQ	HOM	35th	2269	
2006	Phoenix Racing	09	Dodge	DAY; 24	CAL	LVS	ATL	BRI	MAR	TEX	PHO																BRI; DNQ	CAL	RCH; DNQ	NHA	DOV	KAN								50th	355	
2006	Phoenix Racing	09	Ford									TAL; DNQ								DAY; 23	CHI	NHA	POC	IND	GLN	MCH							TAL; 17	CLT	MAR	ATL	TEX	PHO	HOM	50th	355	
2006	BAM Racing	49	Dodge										RCH; 35	DAR	CLT	DOV	POC	MCH	SON																					50th	355	
2007	Phoenix Racing	09	Chevy	DAY; 4	CAL	LVS	ATL	BRI	MAR	TEX	PHO	TAL; DNQ	RCH	DAR	CLT	DOV	POC	MCH	SON	NHA	DAY; DNQ	CHI	IND	POC	GLN	MCH	BRI	CAL	RCH	NHA	DOV	KAN								56th	266	
2007	Robert Yates Racing	88	Ford																														TAL; 19	CLT	MAR	ATL	TEX	PHO	HOM	56th	266	
2008	Richard Childress Racing	33	Chevy	DAY	CAL	LVS	ATL	BRI	MAR	TEX	PHO	TAL	RCH	DAR	CLT	DOV	POC	MCH	SON	NHA	DAY	CHI	IND	POC	GLN	MCH	BRI	CAL	RCH	NHA	DOV	KAN	TAL; 30							63rd	143	
2008	Gillett Evernham Motorsports	10	Dodge																															CLT; 31	MAR	ATL	TEX	PHO	HOM	63rd	143	
2009	TRG Motorsports	71	Chevy	DAY; DNQ	CAL	LVS	ATL	BRI	MAR	TEX	PHO	TAL	RCH	DAR	CLT	DOV																								61st	80	
2009	Gunselman Motorsports	64	Toyota														POC; DNQ	MCH	SON	NHA; Wth	DAY; DNQ	CHI; DNQ	IND	POC; 43	GLN	MCH	BRI; DNQ	ATL	RCH	NHA; 39	DOV	KAN	CAL; DNQ	CLT	MAR	TAL	TEX	PHO	HOM	61st	80	
2010	K-Automotive Motorsports	92	Dodge	DAY; DNQ	CAL	LVS	ATL	BRI	MAR	PHO	TEX	TAL	RCH	DAR	DOV	CLT	POC	MCH	SON	NHA	DAY	CHI	IND	POC	GLN	MCH	BRI	ATL	RCH	NHA	DOV	KAN	CAL	CLT	MAR	TAL	TEX	PHO	HOM	84th	0	
2012	Rick Ware Racing	37	Ford	DAY; DNQ	PHO	LVS	BRI	CAL	MAR	TEX	KAN	RCH	TAL	DAR	CLT	DOV	POC	MCH	SON	KEN	DAY	NHA	IND	POC	GLN	MCH	BRI	ATL	RCH	CHI	NHA	DOV	TAL	CLT	KAN	MAR	TEX	PHO	HOM	76th	0^{1}	
2014	Identity Ventures Racing	66	Toyota	DAY	PHO	LVS	BRI	CAL	MAR	TEX	DAR	RCH	TAL	KAN	CLT	DOV	POC	MCH	SON	KEN	DAY	NHA	IND	POC	GLN	MCH	BRI	ATL	RCH	CHI	NHA; 34	DOV; 40	KAN; 34	CLT		MAR; 26	TEX	PHO; 36	HOM	63rd	0^{1}	
2014	Identity Ventures Racing	49	Toyota																																TAL; 38					63rd	0^{1}	
2015	Premium Motorsports	66	Toyota	DAY; 36																																				47th	8	
2015	Premium Motorsports	66	Chevy		ATL; DNQ	LVS; DNQ	PHO	CAL; Wth	MAR	TEX	BRI	RCH	TAL	KAN	CLT	DOV	POC	MCH	SON	DAY	KEN	NHA	IND	POC	GLN	MCH	BRI	DAR	RCH	CHI	NHA	DOV	CLT	KAN	TAL	MAR	TEX	PHO	HOM	47th	8	
^{†} – Qualified for P. J. Jones

===== Daytona 500 =====
Year	Team	Manufacturer	Start	Finish
1992	Moroso Racing	Oldsmobile	DNQ	
1995	Donlavey Racing	Ford	36	39
1996	Donlavey Racing	Ford	17	37
1997	LJ Racing	Chevrolet	DNQ	
1998	Barkdoll Racing	Chevrolet	23	23
1999	Donlavey Racing	Ford	42	23
2001	Ultra Motorsports	Ford	27	6
2002	Andy Petree Racing	Chevrolet	17	21
2003	Phoenix Racing	Dodge	18	9
2005	Morgan-McClure Motorsports	Chevrolet	41	41
2006	Phoenix Racing	Dodge	24	24
2007	Phoenix Racing	Chevrolet	22	4
2009	TRG Motorsports	Chevrolet	DNQ	
2010	K-Automotive Motorsports	Dodge	DNQ	
2012	Rick Ware Racing	Ford	DNQ	
2015	Premium Motorsports	Toyota	16	36

==== Xfinity Series ====
NASCAR Xfinity Series results
Year	Team	No.	Make	1	2	3	4	5	6	7	8	9	10	11	12	13	14	15	16	17	18	19	20	21	22	23	24	25	26	27	28	29	30	31	32	33	34	35	NXSC	Pts	Ref
1990	Reno Enterprises	40	Chevy	DAY	RCH	CAR	MAR	HCY	DAR	BRI	LAN	SBO	NZH	HCY	CLT	DOV	ROU	VOL	MYB	OXF	NHA	SBO	DUB	IRP	ROU	BRI	DAR	RCH	DOV	MAR	CLT	NHA	CAR	MAR; 6					79th	150	
1991	Highline Racing	18	Pontiac	DAY	RCH	CAR	MAR	VOL	HCY; DNQ	DAR	BRI	LAN; 3	SBO; 13	NZH; 6	CLT; 29	DOV; 33	ROU	HCY	MYB	GLN; 28	OXF	NHA	SBO	DUB	IRP	ROU	BRI	DAR	RCH	DOV									39th	907	
1991	Rusty Wallace Racing	93	Pontiac																												CLT; 20	NHA							39th	907	
1991		11	Chevy																														CAR; 41	MAR; 19					39th	907	
1992	Moroso Racing	20	Olds	DAY; 28	CAR; 21	RCH; 34	ATL; 14	MAR; 10	DAR; 22	BRI; 17	HCY; 15	LAN; 19	DUB; 13	NZH; 34	CLT; 21	DOV	ROU	MYB	GLN	VOL	NHA	TAL	IRP	ROU	MCH	NHA	BRI	DAR	RCH										22nd	1749	
1992	Owen Racing	9	Olds																											DOV; 9	CLT; 40	MAR; 2*	CAR; 34	HCY; 13					22nd	1749	
1993	Owen Racing	9	Chevy	DAY; 20				BRI; 22					CLT; 20	DOV; 15				TAL; 35		MCH; 15							CLT; 10				ATL; 8								12th	3213	
1993	Owen Racing	9	Olds		CAR; 18	RCH; 26	DAR; 19		HCY; 10	ROU; 11	MAR; 15	NZH; 16			MYB; 24	GLN; 10	MLW; 16		IRP; 6		NHA; 26	BRI; 4	DAR; 8	RCH; DNQ	DOV; 9	ROU; 22		MAR; 7	CAR; 20	HCY; 15									12th	3213	
1993	Shoemaker Racing	64	Pontiac																					RCH; 33															12th	3213	
1994	Owen Racing	9	Chevy	DAY; 14	CAR; 10	RCH; 34	ATL; 11	MAR; 33	DAR; 17	HCY; 14	BRI; 14	ROU	NHA; 37	NZH; 3	CLT; DNQ	DOV; 1*	MYB	GLN; 23	MLW; 1*	SBO	TAL; 8	HCY; 13	IRP; 1	MCH; 36	BRI; 20	DAR; 3	RCH	DOV; 33	CLT; DNQ	MAR; 3*	CAR; 7								19th	2679	
1995	Owen Racing	90	Ford	DAY; 20	CAR; 8	RCH; 13	ATL; 37	NSV	DAR; 33	BRI; 8	HCY	NHA; 3	NZH	CLT; 31	DOV; 2	MYB	GLN	MLW; 9	TAL; 6	SBO	IRP; 25	MCH; 37	BRI; 17	DAR; 6	RCH; 11	DOV; 5	CLT; DNQ	CAR; 2	HOM; 15										20th	2295	
1996	Owen Racing	90	Ford	DAY; DNQ	CAR; 13	RCH; 4	ATL; 31	NSV; 33	DAR; 13	BRI; 9	HCY	NZH	CLT; 9	DOV; 5	SBO	MYB	GLN	MLW; 39	NHA; 10	TAL; 41	IRP; 11	MCH	BRI; 35	DAR; 31	RCH; DNQ	DOV; 24	CLT; 26	CAR; 42	HOM; DNQ										26th	1664	
1997	Wellrich Motorsports	7	Chevy	DAY; 41	CAR	RCH	ATL; 22	LVS; 35	DAR	HCY	TEX	BRI; 17	NSV	TAL; 23	NHA	NZH	CLT; 37	DOV	SBO	GLN	MLW	MYB	GTY	IRP	MCH	BRI	DAR	RCH	DOV	CLT	CAL	CAR	HOM						58th	453	
1998	Andy Petree Racing	15	Chevy	DAY; 11	CAR	LVS	NSV	DAR																IRP; 9	MCH	BRI													56th	569	
1998	Andretti-Laird Racing	96	Pontiac						BRI; 41	TEX	HCY	TAL	NHA	NZH	CLT	DOV	RCH	PPR	GLN	MLW	MYB																		56th	569	
1998	Washington-Erving Motorsports	50	Ford																			CAL; 21	SBO				DAR; 35	RCH	DOV	CLT; 20	GTY	CAR; DNQ	ATL	HOM					56th	569	
1999	BACE Motorsports	33	Chevy	DAY	CAR	LVS	ATL	DAR	TEX	NSV	BRI	TAL	CAL	NHA	RCH	NZH	CLT; DNQ	DOV	SBO	GLN																			132nd	40	
1999	Team Rensi Motorsports	25	Chevy																		MLW; QL^{†}	MYB	PPR	GTY	IRP	MCH	BRI												132nd	40	
1999	PRW Racing	77	Ford																									DAR; 41	RCH	DOV	CLT	CAR	MEM	PHO	HOM				132nd	40	
2000	PRW Racing	77	Ford	DAY	CAR	LVS	ATL	DAR	BRI	TEX	NSV	TAL	CAL	RCH	NHA	CLT	DOV	SBO	MYB	GLN; 41	MLW	NZH	PPR	GTY; 33	IRP; 14	MCH; 21	BRI	DAR; 26	RCH; 28	DOV	CLT; 43	CAR	MEM	PHO; 28	HOM				59th	602	
2001	Biagi Brothers Racing	4	Chevy	DAY	CAR	LVS	ATL	DAR	BRI	TEX	NSH	TAL	CAL; 31	RCH	NHA	NZH	CLT; 31	DOV	KEN	MLW	GLN	CHI; 32	GTY	PPR	IRP	MCH; 27	BRI	DAR	RCH; 10	DOV	KAN; 23	CLT	MEM	PHO; 37	CAR	HOM; 23			50th	663	
2002	Biagi Brothers Racing	4	Pontiac	DAY; DNQ	CAR	LVS; 25	DAR	BRI			TAL; 38										DAY; 14																		37th	1506	
2002	Biagi Brothers Racing	4	Chevy						TEX; 27	NSH		CAL; 36	RCH	NHA	NZH	CLT; 39	DOV	NSH	KEN; 31	MLW		CHI; 14	GTY; 20	PPR	IRP; 18	MCH; 19	BRI; 42	DAR	RCH; 24	DOV; 18	KAN; DNQ	CLT; 15	MEM	ATL; 24	CAR	PHO; 21	HOM; DNQ		37th	1506	
2003	Biagi Brothers Racing	4	Pontiac	DAY; 4						TAL; 8											DAY; 13																		13th	3489	
2003	Biagi Brothers Racing	4	Chevy		CAR; 36	LVS; 18	DAR; 16	BRI; 11	TEX; 30		NSH; 28	CAL; 16	RCH; 12	GTY; 16	NZH; 17	CLT; 20	DOV; 17	NSH; 24	KEN; 13	MLW; 22		CHI; 17	NHA	PPR	IRP; 19	MCH; 27	BRI; 16	DAR; 15	RCH; 17	DOV; 10	KAN; 15	CLT; 19	MEM; 17	ATL; 17	PHO; 18	CAR; 29	HOM; 23		13th	3489	
2004	Biagi Brothers Racing	4	Ford	DAY; 35	CAR; 17	LVS; 20	DAR; 36	BRI; 10	TEX; 19	NSH; 38	TAL; 11	CAL; 20	GTY; 41	RCH; 32	NZH; 14	CLT; 29	DOV; 28	NSH; 12	KEN; 31	MLW; 11	DAY; 1	CHI; 15	NHA; 10	PPR; 23	IRP; 21	MCH; 9	BRI; 13	CAL; 18	RCH; 19	DOV; 25	KAN; 18	CLT; 19	MEM; 30	ATL; 21	PHO; 27	DAR; 17	HOM; 25		17th	3461	
2005	Great Lakes Motorsports	61	Pontiac	DAY; 15	CAL	MXC	LVS	ATL	NSH																														40th	1255	
2005	Evernham Motorsports	6	Dodge							BRI; 34	TEX	PHO									DAY; 8	CHI	NHA	PPR	GTY; 2														40th	1255	
2005	Phoenix Racing	09	Dodge										TAL; 39	DAR	RCH	CLT	DOV	NSH	KEN	MLW																			40th	1255	
2005	Rusty Wallace, Inc.	64	Dodge																							IRP; 10	GLN	MCH										HOM; 12	40th	1255	
2005	Akins Motorsports	38	Dodge																										BRI; 14	CAL; 29	RCH; 26	DOV; 31	KAN; 21	CLT	MEM	TEX	PHO		40th	1255	
2006	Phoenix Racing	1	Dodge	DAY	CAL	MXC	LVS	ATL	BRI	TEX	NSH	PHO; 18	TAL; 12	RCH; 13	DAR; 41	CLT; 34	DOV; 14	NSH	KEN; 4	MLW; 5	DAY; 7	CHI	NHA; 12	MAR; 11	GTY; 29	IRP; 13	GLN	MCH	BRI; 15	CAL; 34	RCH; 19	DOV; 22	KAN; 28	CLT; 29	MEM; 18	TEX; 13	PHO; 19		24th	2479	
2006	Phoenix Racing	1	Chevy																																			HOM; 25	24th	2479	
2007	Phoenix Racing	7	Chevy	DAY; 23	CAL; 24	MXC; 19	LVS; 13	ATL; 17	BRI; 29	NSH; 30	TEX; 15	PHO; 19	TAL; 33	RCH; 36	DAR; 23	CLT; 23	DOV; 33	NSH; 25	KEN; 25	MLW; 11	NHA; 28	DAY; 15	CHI; 18	GTY; 12	IRP; 20	CGV; 27	GLN; 26	MCH; 23	BRI; 35	CAL; 16	RCH; 31	DOV; 13	KAN; 41	CLT; 15	MEM; 13	TEX; 21	PHO; 17	HOM; 24	11th	3396	
2008	Germain Racing	7	Toyota	DAY; 24	CAL; 16	LVS; 7	ATL; 17	BRI; 10	NSH; 20	TEX; 25	PHO; 15	MXC; 12	TAL; 10	RCH; 13	DAR; 25	CLT; 22	DOV; 8	NSH; 6	KEN; 3	MLW; 18	NHA; 15	DAY; 22	CHI; 20	GTY; 11	IRP; 17	CGV; 15	GLN; 18	MCH; 15	BRI; 35	CAL; 16	RCH; 15	DOV; 12	KAN; 15	CLT; 10	MEM; 14	TEX; 12	PHO; 9	HOM; 18	8th	4128	
2009	JD Motorsports	01	Chevy	DAY; 19	CAL	LVS	BRI	TEX	NSH	PHO																		CGV; 19	ATL; 19	RCH; 24	DOV; 22	KAN; 17	CAL; 15	CLT; 30	MEM; 15	TEX; 28	PHO; 22	HOM; 15	35th	1535	
2009	JD Motorsports	0	Chevy								TAL; 39	RCH	DAR	CLT	DOV	NSH	KEN	MLW	NHA; DNQ	DAY; DNQ	CHI; 38	GTY; 22	IRP; DNQ	IOW	GLN; 39														35th	1535	
2009	Jimmy Means Racing	52	Chevy																							MCH; 34	BRI												35th	1535	
2010	JD Motorsports	01	Chevy	DAY; 28	CAL; 12	LVS; 11	BRI; 17	NSH; 17	PHO; 23	TEX; 32	TAL; 42	RCH; 40	DAR; 13	DOV; 34	CLT; 35	NSH; 17	KEN; 21	ROA; 18	NHA; 28	DAY; 34	CHI; 22	GTY; 22	IRP; 22	IOW; 28	GLN; 18	MCH; 20	BRI; 31	CGV; 17	ATL; 36	RCH; 29	DOV; 19	KAN; 12	CAL; 21	CLT; 25	GTY; 16	TEX; 23	PHO; 29	HOM; 30	18th	3204	
2011	JD Motorsports	01	Chevy	DAY; 37	PHO; 26	LVS; 21	BRI; 32	CAL; 24	TEX; 22	TAL; 18	NSH; 18	RCH; 33	DAR; 15	DOV; 10	IOW; 19	CLT; 25	CHI; 16	MCH; 22	ROA; 5	DAY; 15	KEN; 16	NHA; 27	NSH; 19	IRP; 17	IOW; 31	GLN; 20	CGV; 17	BRI; 26	ATL; 16	RCH; 15	CHI; 20	DOV; 29	KAN; 24	CLT; 22	TEX; 32	PHO; 16	HOM; 20		13th	777	
2012	JD Motorsports	01	Chevy	DAY; 28	PHO; 32	LVS; 17	BRI; 23	CAL; 18	TEX; 19	RCH; 24	TAL; 28	DAR; 30	IOW; 21	CLT; 15	DOV; 18	MCH; 20	ROA; 19	KEN; 31	DAY; 36	NHA; 15	CHI; 16	IND; 20	IOW; 25	GLN; 18	CGV; 7	BRI; 17	ATL; 17	RCH; 21	CHI; 19	KEN; 20	DOV; 21	CLT; 23	KAN; 21	TEX; 24	PHO; 19	HOM; 26			12th	749	
2013	JD Motorsports	01	Chevy	DAY; 34	PHO; 32	LVS; 34	BRI; 23	CAL; 23	TEX; 21	RCH; 33	TAL; 7	DAR; 25	CLT; 24	DOV; 31	IOW; 20	MCH; 16	ROA; 13	KEN; 21	DAY; 37	NHA; 28	CHI; 24	IND; 22	IOW; 24	GLN; 40	MOH; 33	BRI; 27	ATL; 27	RCH; 24	CHI; 28	KEN; 22	DOV; 21	KAN; 31	CLT; 22	TEX; 25	PHO; 25	HOM; 28			17th	609	
2014	JGL Racing	28	Dodge	DAY; 13	PHO; 20	LVS; 26	BRI; 25	CAL; 21																															28th	229	
2014	MBM Motorsports	13	Toyota						TEX; 37																														28th	229	
2014	JGL Racing	93	Dodge							DAR; 17	RCH; 27	TAL	IOW	CLT	DOV	MCH	ROA	KEN; 25	DAY; 10	NHA	CHI	IND	IOW	GLN	MOH	BRI	ATL	RCH	CHI	KEN	DOV	KAN	CLT	TEX					28th	229	
2014	Mike Harmon Racing	74	Dodge																																PHO; 35	HOM			28th	229	
2015	JGL Racing	26	Toyota	DAY; 13	ATL	LVS	PHO	CAL	TEX	BRI	RCH	TAL	IOW	CLT	DOV	MCH	CHI	DAY	KEN	NHA	IND	IOW	GLN	MOH	BRI	ROA	DAR	RCH	CHI	KEN	DOV	CLT	KAN	TEX	PHO	HOM			98th	0^{1}	
2020	JD Motorsports	0	Chevy	DAY	LVS	CAL	PHO	DAR	CLT	BRI	ATL	HOM	HOM	TAL	POC	IRC; 24	KEN	KEN	TEX	KAN	ROA; 24	DRC; 25	DOV	DOV	DAY	DAR	RCH	RCH	BRI	LVS	TAL	ROV	KAN	TEX	MAR	PHO			55th	38	
^{†} – Qualified for Kenny Wallace

==== Camping World Truck Series ====
NASCAR Camping World Truck Series results
Year	Team	No.	Make	1	2	3	4	5	6	7	8	9	10	11	12	13	14	15	16	17	18	19	20	21	22	23	24	25	26	27	NCWTC	Pts	Ref
1995	MB Motorsports	26	Ford	PHO	TUS	SGS	MMR	POR	EVG	I70	LVL	BRI	MLW	CNS	HPT	IRP	FLM	RCH	MAR	NWS; 29	SON	MMR	PHO								96th	76	
1996	Info not available			HOM	PHO	POR	EVG	TUS	CNS	HPT	BRI	NZH	MLW	LVL	I70	IRP; DNQ	FLM	GLN	NSV	RCH	NHA	MAR	NWS	SON	MMR	PHO	LVS				128th	58	
1997	Ken Schrader Racing	52	Chevy	WDW	TUS	HOM	PHO	POR	EVG	I70	NHA	TEX	BRI	NZH	MLW; 6	LVL; 10	CNS; 18	HPT; 14	IRP; 28	FLM; 7	NSV; 34	GLN; 22	RCH; 19	MAR; 22	SON; 29	MMR; 7	CAL; 2	PHO; 6	LVS; 7		23rd	1788	
1998	Ken Schrader Racing	52	Chevy	WDW; 24	HOM; 34	PHO; 11	POR; 19	EVG; 5	I70; 7	GLN; 10	TEX; 12	BRI; 4	MLW; 8	NZH; 22	CAL; 12	PPR; 30	IRP; 33	**NHA**; 14	FLM; 10	NSV; 5	HPT; 27	LVL; 10	RCH; 10	MEM; 7	GTY; 8	MAR; 24	SON; 22	MMR; 20	PHO; 30	LVS; 12	13th	3152	
1999	Ultra Motorsports	2	Ford	HOM; 1	PHO; 14	EVG; 5	MMR; 8	MAR; 26*	MEM; 28	PPR; 1	I70; 17	BRI; 14	TEX; 4	PIR; 11	GLN; 2	MLW; 4	NSV; 18	NZH; 12	MCH; 12	NHA; 2	IRP; 3	GTY; 5	HPT; 9	RCH; 4	LVS; 28	LVL; 2	TEX; 4	CAL; 23			6th	3494	
2000	Ultra Motorsports	2	Ford	DAY; 1*	HOM; 2	PHO; 9	**MMR**; 1	**MAR**; 2	PIR; 4	GTY; 7	MEM; 4	PPR; 33	EVG; 16	TEX; 2	KEN; 3	GLN; 4	MLW; 22	NHA; 2	NZH; 10	MCH; 3	IRP; 4	NSV; 13	CIC; 3	RCH; 15	DOV; 12*	TEX; 21	CAL; 32				4th	3450	
2002	Ken Schrader Racing	52	Chevy	DAY; 30	DAR	MAR	GTY; 35	PPR	DOV	TEX	MEM	MLW	KAN	KEN	NHA	MCH	IRP; 4	NSH; 10	RCH	TEX	SBO	LVS	CAL	PHO	HOM						44th	430	
2003	Ken Schrader Racing	52	Chevy	DAY; 6	DAR	MMR	MAR	CLT	DOV	TEX	MEM	MLW	KAN	KEN	GTY	MCH	IRP	NSH; 12	BRI	RCH	NHA	CAL	LVS	SBO	TEX	MAR					46th	500	
2003	Brevak Racing	31	Dodge																								PHO; 15	HOM; 21			46th	500	
2004	Ken Schrader Racing	52	Chevy	DAY; 3	ATL	MAR	MFD	CLT	DOV	TEX	MEM	MLW	KAN	KEN	GTY	MCH	IRP	NSH	BRI	RCH	NHA	LVS	CAL	TEX	MAR	PHO	DAR	HOM			68th	170	
2005	Ken Schrader Racing	52	Chevy	DAY; DNQ	CAL	ATL	MAR	GTY	MFD	CLT	DOV	TEX	MCH	MLW	KAN	KEN	MEM														39th	604	
2005	Darrell Waltrip Motorsports	12	Toyota															IRP; 26	NSH; 18	BRI; 9	RCH; 6	NHA; 17	LVS	MAR	ATL	TEX	PHO	HOM			39th	604	
2006	HT Motorsports	59	Dodge	DAY; 31	CAL; 31	ATL	MAR	GTY	CLT	MFD	DOV	TEX	MCH																		47th	327	
2006	Brevak Racing	31	Dodge											MLW; DNQ	KAN	KEN	MEM	IRP	NSH	BRI	NHA	LVS									47th	327	
2006	Billy Ballew Motorsports	15	Chevy																				TAL; 26	MAR	ATL	TEX	PHO	HOM; 22			47th	327	
2007	Morgan-Dollar Motorsports	46	Chevy	DAY; 36	CAL	ATL	MAR	KAN	CLT	MFD	DOV	TEX	MCH	MLW	MEM	KEN	IRP	NSH	BRI	GTY	NHA	LVS									78th	167	
2007	Germain Racing	03	Toyota																				TAL; 17	MAR	ATL	TEX	PHO	HOM			78th	167	
2008	Germain Racing	9	Toyota	DAY	CAL	ATL	MAR	KAN	CLT	MFD	DOV	TEX	MCH	MLW	MEM	KEN	IRP	NSH	BRI	GTY	NHA	LVS	TAL; 5	MAR	ATL	TEX	PHO	HOM			70th	155	
2009	Fast Track Racing Enterprises	48	Chevy	DAY	CAL	ATL	MAR	KAN	CLT	DOV	TEX	MCH	MLW	MEM	KEN	IRP	NSH	BRI	CHI	IOW	GTY	NHA	LVS	MAR	TAL; 28	TEX	PHO	HOM			96th	84	
2011	Kevin Harvick Inc.	33	Chevy	DAY	PHO	DAR	MAR	NSH	DOV	CLT	KAN	TEX	KEN	IOW	NSH	IRP	POC	MCH	BRI	ATL	CHI	NHA	KEN	LVS	TAL; 1*	MAR	TEX	HOM			87th	0^{1}	

^{*} Season still in progress
^{1} Ineligible for series points

=== ARCA Re/Max Series ===
(key) (Bold – Pole position awarded by qualifying time. Italics – Pole position earned by points standings or practice time. * – Most laps led.)

ARCA Re/Max Series results
Year	Team	No.	Make	1	2	3	4	5	6	7	8	9	10	11	12	13	14	15	16	17	18	19	20	21	22	23	24	25	ARMC	Pts	Ref
1991	Dale Earnhardt, Inc.	04	Chevy	DAY	ATL; 32	KIL	TAL	TOL	FRS	POC	MCH	KIL	FRS	DEL	POC	TAL	HPT	MCH	ISF	TOL	DSF	TWS	ATL; 2						95th	–	
1992	Mike Pritchard	20	Pontiac	DAY	FIF	TWS	TAL	TOL	KIL	POC	MCH	FRS	KIL	NSH	DEL	POC	HPT	FRS	ISF	TOL	DSF	TWS	SLM	**ATL**; 5*					159th	–	
1993	Mike Pritchard	20	Pontiac	DAY; 29	FIF	TWS	TAL	KIL	CMS	FRS	TOL	POC	MCH	FRS	POC	KIL	ISF	DSF	TOL	SLM	WIN	ATL							144th	–	
1994	Ken Schrader Racing	52	Chevy	DAY; 1*	TAL	FIF	LVL	KIL	TOL	FRS	MCH	DMS	POC	POC	KIL	FRS	INF	I70	ISF	DSF	TOL	SLM	WIN						105th	730	
1994	Owen Racing	90	Ford																					ATL; 1					105th	730	
1995	Owen Racing	90	Ford	DAY; 3	ATL; 2*	TAL; 1	FIF	KIL	FRS	MCH; 3	I80	MCS	FRS	POC; 1*	**POC**; 1*	KIL	FRS	SBS	LVL	ISF	DSF	SLM	WIN	ATL; 22					21st	1855	
1996	Active Motorsports	20	Chevy	DAY	ATL	SLM	TAL	FIF	LVL	CLT	CLT	KIL	FRS	POC; 1	MCH	FRS	TOL	POC	MCH										92nd	–	
1996	Roulo Brothers Racing	39	Chevy																	INF; 2	SBS	ISF	DSF; 8	KIL	SLM	WIN	CLT	ATL	92nd	–	
1997	Roulo Brothers Racing	39	Chevy	DAY	ATL	SLM	CLT	CLT	POC	MCH	SBS	TOL	KIL	FRS	MIN	POC	MCH	**DSF**; 29	GTW; 27	SLM	WIN	CLT	TAL	ISF	ATL				118th	–	
1998	Mike Wallace	6	Ford	DAY; 2	ATL	SLM	CLT	MEM	MCH	POC	SBS	TOL	PPR	POC	KIL	FRS	ISF	ATL	DSF	SLM	TEX	WIN							N/A	0	
1998	Team Rensi Motorsports	83	Chevy																				CLT; 2	TAL	ATL				N/A	0	
2006	Phoenix Racing	09	Dodge	DAY	NSH	SLM	WIN	KEN	TOL	POC	MCH	KAN	KEN	BLN	POC	GTW	NSH	MCH	ISF	MIL	TOL	DSF	CHI	SLM	TAL; 6*	IOW			106th	210	

==== Winston West Series ====
NASCAR Winston West Series results
Year	Team	No.	Make	1	2	3	4	5	6	7	8	9	10	11	12	13	14	NWWC	Pts	Ref
1997	Joe Falk	91	Chevy	TUS	AMP	SON	TUS	MMR	LVS	CAL; 2	EVG	POR	PPR	AMP	SON	MMR		34th	350	
1997	Jim Smith	12	Ford														LVS; 2	34th	350	
1999	Fred Biagi	2	Ford	TUS	LVS	**PHO**; 1*											**MOT**; 19*	21st	801	
1999	Jim Smith	26	Ford				CAL; 4	**PPR**; 1	MMR	IRW; 5	EVG	POR	IRW	RMR	LVS	MMR		21st	801	

=== CARS Super Late Model Tour ===
(key)

CARS Super Late Model Tour results
Year	Team	No.	Make	1	2	3	4	5	6	7	8	9	CSLMTC	Pts	Ref
2018	Mike Wallace	6	Chevy	MYB	NSH	ROU	HCY	BRI	AND	HCY	ROU	SBO; 13	41st	20	

=== IHRA Pro Late Model Series ===
(key) (Bold – Pole position awarded by qualifying time. Italics – Pole position earned by points standings or practice time. * – Most laps led. ** – All laps led.)

IHRA Pro Late Model Series
Year	Team	No.	Make	1	2	3	ISCSS	Pts	Ref
2026	N/A	6W	N/A	DUB	CDL	AND; DNS	N/A	0	
