= 1992 AC Delco 500 =

27th race of the 1992 NASCAR Winston Cup Series

Race details
- Race 27 of 29 in the 1992 NASCAR Winston Cup Series
- The 1992 AC Delco 500 program cover, featuring Richard Petty.
- Date: October 25, 1992
- Official name: 28th Annual AC Delco 500
- Location: Rockingham, North Carolina, North Carolina Motor Speedway
- Course: Permanent racing facility
- Course length: 1.017 miles (1.636 km)
- Distance: 492 laps, 500.364 mi (805.257 km)
- Scheduled distance: 492 laps, 500.364 mi (805.257 km)
- Average speed: 130.748 miles per hour (210.419 km/h)
- Attendance: 62,300

Pole position
Driver	Kyle Petty	SABCO Racing
- Time: 24.461

Most laps led
Driver	Kyle Petty	SABCO Racing
- Laps: 484

Winner
No. 42	Kyle Petty	SABCO Racing

Television in the United States
- Network: TNN
- Announcers: Mike Joy, Buddy Baker, Neil Bonnett

Radio in the United States
- Radio: Motor Racing Network

The 1992 AC Delco 500 was the 27th stock car race of the 1992 NASCAR Winston Cup Series season and the 28th iteration of the event. The race was held on Sunday, October 25, 1992, before an audience of 62,300 in Rockingham, North Carolina, at North Carolina Speedway, a 1.017 miles (1.637 km) permanent high-banked racetrack. The race took the scheduled 492 laps to complete. At race's end, SABCO Racing driver Kyle Petty would dominate the race to take his sixth career NASCAR Winston Cup Series victory and his second and final victory of the season. To fill out the top three, Morgan–McClure Motorsports driver Ernie Irvan and Hendrick Motorsports driver Ricky Rudd would finish second and third, respectively.

In the overall driver's championship standings, championship leader Bill Elliott, assisted by a fourth-place finish, would manage to increase his points lead over second-place driver Davey Allison to 70 points after three consecutive poor finishes for Elliott. The winner of the race, Kyle Petty, would move to fourth in the standings, 94 points behind Elliott, and nine points behind third-place driver Alan Kulwicki, who was 85 points behind Elliott in the standings.

== Background ==
The layout of North Carolina Speedway, the venue where the race was held.

North Carolina Speedway was opened as a flat, one-mile oval on October 31, 1965. In 1969, the track was extensively reconfigured to a high-banked, D-shaped oval just over one mile in length. In 1997, North Carolina Motor Speedway merged with Penske Motorsports, and was renamed North Carolina Speedway. Shortly thereafter, the infield was reconfigured, and competition on the infield road course, mostly by the SCCA, was discontinued. Currently, the track is home to the Fast Track High Performance Driving School.

=== Entry list ===
- (R) denotes rookie driver.

#	Driver	Team	Make
1	Rick Mast	Precision Products Racing	Oldsmobile
2	Rusty Wallace	Penske Racing South	Pontiac
3	Dale Earnhardt	Richard Childress Racing	Chevrolet
4	Ernie Irvan	Morgan–McClure Motorsports	Chevrolet
5	Ricky Rudd	Hendrick Motorsports	Chevrolet
6	Mark Martin	Roush Racing	Ford
7	Alan Kulwicki	AK Racing	Ford
8	Dick Trickle	Stavola Brothers Racing	Ford
9	Chad Little	Melling Racing	Ford
10	Derrike Cope	Whitcomb Racing	Chevrolet
11	Bill Elliott	Junior Johnson & Associates	Ford
12	Jimmy Spencer	Bobby Allison Motorsports	Chevrolet
15	Geoff Bodine	Bud Moore Engineering	Ford
16	Wally Dallenbach Jr.	Roush Racing	Ford
17	Darrell Waltrip	Darrell Waltrip Motorsports	Chevrolet
18	Dale Jarrett	Joe Gibbs Racing	Chevrolet
21	Morgan Shepherd	Wood Brothers Racing	Ford
22	Sterling Marlin	Junior Johnson & Associates	Ford
25	Ken Schrader	Hendrick Motorsports	Chevrolet
26	Brett Bodine	King Racing	Ford
28	Davey Allison	Robert Yates Racing	Ford
30	Michael Waltrip	Bahari Racing	Pontiac
32	Jimmy Horton	Active Motorsports	Chevrolet
33	Harry Gant	Leo Jackson Motorsports	Oldsmobile
41	Greg Sacks	Larry Hedrick Motorsports	Chevrolet
42	Kyle Petty	SABCO Racing	Pontiac
43	Richard Petty	Petty Enterprises	Pontiac
52	Jimmy Means	Jimmy Means Racing	Pontiac
53	John McFadden	Jimmy Means Racing	Pontiac
55	Ted Musgrave	RaDiUs Motorsports	Ford
65	Jerry O'Neil	Aroneck Racing	Oldsmobile
66	Jimmy Hensley (R)	Cale Yarborough Motorsports	Ford
68	Bobby Hamilton	TriStar Motorsports	Ford
71	Dave Marcis	Marcis Auto Racing	Chevrolet
77	Mike Potter	Jimmy Means Racing	Pontiac
80	Dave Blaney	Hover Motorsports	Pontiac
83	Lake Speed	Speed Racing	Ford
85	Mike Skinner	Mansion Motorsports	Chevrolet
88	Mike Wallace	Owen Racing	Ford
94	Terry Labonte	Hagan Racing	Oldsmobile

== Qualifying ==
Qualifying was split into two rounds. The first round was held on Thursday, October 22, at 2:30 PM EST. Each driver would have one lap to set a time. During the first round, the top 20 drivers in the round would be guaranteed a starting spot in the race. If a driver was not able to guarantee a spot in the first round, they had the option to scrub their time from the first round and try and run a faster lap time in a second round qualifying run, held on Friday, October 23, at 1:00 PM EST. As with the first round, each driver would have one lap to set a time. For this specific race, positions 21-40 would be decided on time, and depending on who needed it, a select amount of positions were given to cars who had not otherwise qualified but were high enough in owner's points; up to two were given. If needed, a past champion who did not qualify on either time or provisionals could use a champion's provisional, adding one more spot to the field.

Kyle Petty, driving for SABCO Racing, won the pole, setting a time of 24.461 and an average speed of 149.675 mph (240.879 km/h) in the first round.

No drivers would fail to qualify.

=== Full qualifying results ===
Pos.	#	Driver	Team	Make	Time	Speed
1	42	Kyle Petty	SABCO Racing	Pontiac	24.461	149.675
2	6	Mark Martin	Roush Racing	Ford	24.468	149.632
3	11	Bill Elliott	Junior Johnson & Associates	Ford	24.564	149.047
4	68	Bobby Hamilton	TriStar Motorsports	Ford	24.581	148.944
5	4	Ernie Irvan	Morgan–McClure Motorsports	Chevrolet	24.593	148.872
6	26	Brett Bodine	King Racing	Ford	24.594	148.866
7	5	Ricky Rudd	Hendrick Motorsports	Chevrolet	24.620	148.708
8	7	Alan Kulwicki	AK Racing	Ford	24.621	148.702
9	2	Rusty Wallace	Penske Racing South	Pontiac	24.705	148.197
10	15	Geoff Bodine	Bud Moore Engineering	Ford	24.707	148.185
11	94	Terry Labonte	Hagan Racing	Oldsmobile	24.792	147.677
12	3	Dale Earnhardt	Richard Childress Racing	Chevrolet	24.795	147.659
13	21	Morgan Shepherd	Wood Brothers Racing	Ford	24.803	147.611
14	8	Dick Trickle	Stavola Brothers Racing	Ford	24.821	147.504
15	28	Davey Allison	Robert Yates Racing	Ford	24.837	147.405
16	55	Ted Musgrave	RaDiUs Motorsports	Ford	24.856	147.296
17	25	Ken Schrader	Hendrick Motorsports	Chevrolet	24.865	147.243
18	33	Harry Gant	Leo Jackson Motorsports	Oldsmobile	24.878	147.166
19	22	Sterling Marlin	Junior Johnson & Associates	Ford	24.884	147.131
20	17	Darrell Waltrip	Darrell Waltrip Motorsports	Chevrolet	24.904	147.013
Failed to lock in Round 1
21	12	Jimmy Spencer	Bobby Allison Motorsports	Ford	24.927	146.877
22	30	Michael Waltrip	Bahari Racing	Pontiac	24.954	146.718
23	66	Jimmy Hensley (R)	Cale Yarborough Motorsports	Ford	24.987	146.524
24	10	Derrike Cope	Whitcomb Racing	Chevrolet	25.028	146.284
25	1	Rick Mast	Precision Products Racing	Oldsmobile	25.059	146.103
26	43	Richard Petty	Petty Enterprises	Pontiac	25.059	146.103
27	18	Dale Jarrett	Joe Gibbs Racing	Chevrolet	25.063	146.080
28	32	Jimmy Horton	Active Motorsports	Chevrolet	25.172	145.447
29	71	Dave Marcis	Marcis Auto Racing	Chevrolet	25.223	145.153
30	16	Wally Dallenbach Jr.	Roush Racing	Ford	25.250	144.998
31	41	Greg Sacks	Larry Hedrick Motorsports	Chevrolet	25.302	144.700
32	85	Mike Skinner	Mansion Motorsports	Chevrolet	25.382	144.358
33	9	Chad Little	Melling Racing	Ford	25.486	143.655
34	88	Mike Wallace	Owen Racing	Ford	25.565	143.211
35	83	Lake Speed	Speed Racing	Ford	25.568	143.195
36	80	Dave Blaney	Hover Motorsports	Pontiac	26.053	140.529
37	52	Jimmy Means	Jimmy Means Racing	Pontiac	26.139	140.067
38	65	Jerry O'Neil	Aroneck Racing	Oldsmobile	26.202	139.730
39	77	Mike Potter	Jimmy Means Racing	Pontiac	26.281	139.310
40	53	John McFadden	Jimmy Means Racing	Pontiac	26.290	139.262
Official first round qualifying results
Official starting lineup

== Race results ==
Fin	St	#	Driver	Team	Make	Laps	Led	Status	Pts	Winnings
1	1	42	Kyle Petty	SABCO Racing	Pontiac	492	484	running	185	$153,100
2	5	4	Ernie Irvan	Morgan–McClure Motorsports	Chevrolet	492	2	running	175	$53,200
3	7	5	Ricky Rudd	Hendrick Motorsports	Chevrolet	491	0	running	165	$31,225
4	3	11	Bill Elliott	Junior Johnson & Associates	Ford	491	3	running	165	$26,200
5	19	22	Sterling Marlin	Junior Johnson & Associates	Ford	491	0	running	155	$20,075
6	18	33	Harry Gant	Leo Jackson Motorsports	Oldsmobile	491	0	running	150	$21,450
7	6	26	Brett Bodine	King Racing	Ford	491	0	running	146	$15,200
8	12	3	Dale Earnhardt	Richard Childress Racing	Chevrolet	490	0	running	142	$22,350
9	11	94	Terry Labonte	Hagan Racing	Oldsmobile	490	0	running	138	$14,500
10	15	28	Davey Allison	Robert Yates Racing	Ford	490	0	running	134	$20,600
11	21	12	Jimmy Spencer	Bobby Allison Motorsports	Ford	489	0	running	130	$13,600
12	8	7	Alan Kulwicki	AK Racing	Ford	489	0	running	127	$15,500
13	13	21	Morgan Shepherd	Wood Brothers Racing	Ford	489	0	running	124	$13,600
14	24	10	Derrike Cope	Whitcomb Racing	Chevrolet	488	0	running	121	$9,800
15	27	18	Dale Jarrett	Joe Gibbs Racing	Chevrolet	488	0	running	118	$12,550
16	14	8	Dick Trickle	Stavola Brothers Racing	Ford	487	0	running	115	$11,500
17	25	1	Rick Mast	Precision Products Racing	Oldsmobile	487	0	running	112	$11,500
18	23	66	Jimmy Hensley (R)	Cale Yarborough Motorsports	Ford	487	0	running	109	$8,950
19	4	68	Bobby Hamilton	TriStar Motorsports	Ford	487	0	running	106	$11,950
20	22	30	Michael Waltrip	Bahari Racing	Pontiac	486	0	running	103	$11,150
21	9	2	Rusty Wallace	Penske Racing South	Pontiac	485	0	running	100	$16,700
22	20	17	Darrell Waltrip	Darrell Waltrip Motorsports	Chevrolet	485	0	running	97	$15,600
23	30	16	Wally Dallenbach Jr.	Roush Racing	Ford	484	0	running	94	$5,400
24	33	9	Chad Little	Melling Racing	Ford	483	0	running	91	$5,300
25	26	43	Richard Petty	Petty Enterprises	Pontiac	482	0	running	88	$9,850
26	37	52	Jimmy Means	Jimmy Means Racing	Pontiac	475	0	running	85	$6,700
27	34	88	Mike Wallace	Owen Racing	Ford	474	0	running	82	$5,000
28	32	85	Mike Skinner	Mansion Motorsports	Chevrolet	459	0	running	79	$4,900
29	16	55	Ted Musgrave	RaDiUs Motorsports	Ford	454	0	running	76	$9,375
30	2	6	Mark Martin	Roush Racing	Ford	436	3	crash	78	$15,700
31	36	80	Dave Blaney	Hover Motorsports	Pontiac	371	0	handling	70	$4,500
32	17	25	Ken Schrader	Hendrick Motorsports	Chevrolet	322	0	vibration	67	$22,000
33	31	41	Greg Sacks	Larry Hedrick Motorsports	Chevrolet	304	0	rear end	64	$5,850
34	28	32	Jimmy Horton	Active Motorsports	Chevrolet	299	0	overheating	61	$4,200
35	10	15	Geoff Bodine	Bud Moore Engineering	Ford	278	0	engine	58	$8,625
36	35	83	Lake Speed	Speed Racing	Ford	263	0	transmission	55	$4,075
37	38	65	Jerry O'Neil	Aroneck Racing	Oldsmobile	233	0	brakes	52	$4,625
38	29	71	Dave Marcis	Marcis Auto Racing	Chevrolet	144	0	rear end	49	$5,525
39	39	77	Mike Potter	Jimmy Means Racing	Pontiac	7	0	handling	46	$4,025
40	40	53	John McFadden	Jimmy Means Racing	Pontiac	4	0	handling	43	$4,050
Official race results

== Standings after the race ==
Drivers' Championship standings

	Pos	Driver	Points
	1	Bill Elliott	3,818
	2	Davey Allison	3,748 (-70)
	3	Alan Kulwicki	3,733 (-85)
2	4	Kyle Petty	3,724 (–94)
	5	Harry Gant	3,705 (–113)
2	6	Mark Martin	3,640 (–178)
	7	Ricky Rudd	3,574 (–244)
1	8	Ernie Irvan	3,438 (–380)
1	9	Darrell Waltrip	3,400 (–418)
	10	Terry Labonte	3,399 (–419)
Official driver's standings

- Note: Only the first 10 positions are included for the driver standings.

Previous race: 1992 Mello Yello 500	NASCAR Winston Cup Series; 1992 season	Next race: 1992 Pyroil 500K
