= 1992 Mello Yello 500 =

26th race of the 1992 NASCAR Winston Cup Series

Race details
- Race 26 of 29 in the 1992 NASCAR Winston Cup Series
- The 1992 Mello Yello 500 program cover, featuring Richard Petty. Artwork by NASCAR artist Sam Bass.
- Date: October 11, 1992
- Official name: 33rd Annual Mello Yello 500
- Location: Concord, North Carolina, Charlotte Motor Speedway
- Course: Permanent racing facility
- Course length: 1.5 miles (2.41 km)
- Distance: 334 laps, 501 mi (806.281 km)
- Scheduled distance: 334 laps, 501 mi (806.281 km)
- Average speed: 153.537 miles per hour (247.094 km/h)
- Attendance: 162,500

Pole position
Driver	Alan Kulwicki	AK Racing
- Time: 30.163

Most laps led
Driver	Kyle Petty	SABCO Racing
- Laps: 129

Winner
No. 6	Mark Martin	Roush Racing

Television in the United States
- Network: TBS
- Announcers: Ken Squier, Neil Bonnett

Radio in the United States
- Radio: Performance Racing Network

The 1992 Mello Yello 500 was the 26th stock car race of the 1992 NASCAR Winston Cup Series season and the 33rd iteration of the event. The race was held on Sunday, October 11, 1992, before an audience of 162,500 in Concord, North Carolina, at Charlotte Motor Speedway, a 1.5 miles (2.4 km) permanent quad-oval. The race took the scheduled 334 laps to complete. At race's end, Roush Racing driver Mark Martin would manage to make a late-race pass on eventual second-place finisher, owner-driver Alan Kulwicki with 32 laps to go to take his seventh career NASCAR Winston Cup Series victory and his second and final victory of the season. To fill out the top three, SABCO Racing driver Kyle Petty would finish third.

With poor finishes from the top two in the driver's championship standings, those being Bill Elliott and Davey Allison, the points battle had tightened to extreme margins, with the top five in the driver's championship all being within 100 points within the leader with three races left in the season, the first time of such an occurrence in NASCAR history.

Bobby Hillin Jr. was disqualified after the race after his car was found to have illegal engine in post-race inspection. It was the last time a disqualification was levied in the Cup Series for technical infringement until 2019, when Erik Jones was disqualified from the 2019 Federated Auto Parts 400. The disqualification affected the team Hillin drove for, which opted to shut down after it was unable to pay for the fines levied for the inspection failure.

== Background ==
The layout of Charlotte Motor Speedway, the venue where the race was held.

Charlotte Motor Speedway is a motorsports complex located in Concord, North Carolina, United States 13 miles from Charlotte, North Carolina. The complex features a 1.5 miles (2.4 km) quad oval track that hosts NASCAR racing including the prestigious Coca-Cola 600 on Memorial Day weekend and the NEXTEL All-Star Challenge, as well as the UAW-GM Quality 500. The speedway was built in 1959 by Bruton Smith and is considered the home track for NASCAR with many race teams located in the Charlotte area. The track is owned and operated by Speedway Motorsports Inc. (SMI) with Marcus Smith (son of Bruton Smith) as track president.

=== Entry list ===
- (R) denotes rookie driver.

#	Driver	Team	Make
1	Rick Mast	Precision Products Racing	Oldsmobile
2	Rusty Wallace	Penske Racing South	Pontiac
3	Dale Earnhardt	Richard Childress Racing	Chevrolet
4	Ernie Irvan	Morgan–McClure Motorsports	Chevrolet
5	Ricky Rudd	Hendrick Motorsports	Chevrolet
05	Ed Ferree	Ferree Racing	Chevrolet
6	Mark Martin	Roush Racing	Ford
7	Alan Kulwicki	AK Racing	Ford
8	Dick Trickle	Stavola Brothers Racing	Ford
9	Chad Little	Melling Racing	Ford
10	Derrike Cope	Whitcomb Racing	Chevrolet
11	Bill Elliott	Junior Johnson & Associates	Ford
12	Jeff Purvis	Bobby Allison Motorsports	Chevrolet
15	Geoff Bodine	Bud Moore Engineering	Ford
16	Wally Dallenbach Jr.	Roush Racing	Ford
17	Darrell Waltrip	Darrell Waltrip Motorsports	Chevrolet
18	Dale Jarrett	Joe Gibbs Racing	Chevrolet
21	Morgan Shepherd	Wood Brothers Racing	Ford
22	Sterling Marlin	Junior Johnson & Associates	Ford
25	Ken Schrader	Hendrick Motorsports	Chevrolet
26	Brett Bodine	King Racing	Ford
28	Davey Allison	Robert Yates Racing	Ford
30	Michael Waltrip	Bahari Racing	Pontiac
31	Bobby Hillin Jr.	Team Ireland	Chevrolet
33	Harry Gant	Leo Jackson Motorsports	Oldsmobile
41	Dick Trickle	Larry Hedrick Motorsports	Chevrolet
42	Kyle Petty	SABCO Racing	Pontiac
43	Richard Petty	Petty Enterprises	Pontiac
45	Rich Bickle	Terminal Trucking Motorsports	Ford
48	James Hylton	Hylton Motorsports	Pontiac
49	Stanley Smith	BS&S Motorsports	Chevrolet
52	Jimmy Means	Jimmy Means Racing	Pontiac
55	Ted Musgrave	RaDiUs Motorsports	Ford
57	Bob Schacht (R)	Stringer Motorsports	Oldsmobile
65	Jerry O'Neil	Aroneck Racing	Oldsmobile
66	Jimmy Hensley (R)	Cale Yarborough Motorsports	Ford
68	Bobby Hamilton	TriStar Motorsports	Ford
71	Jim Sauter	Marcis Auto Racing	Chevrolet
77	Mike Potter	Balough Racing	Buick
82	Mark Stahl	Stahl Racing	Ford
83	Lake Speed	Speed Racing	Ford
85	Mike Skinner	Mansion Motorsports	Chevrolet
90	Pancho Carter	Donlavey Racing	Ford
94	Terry Labonte	Hagan Racing	Oldsmobile
97	Hut Stricklin	Junior Johnson & Associates	Ford

== Qualifying ==
Qualifying was split into two rounds. The first round was held on Wednesday, October 7, at 5:00 PM EST. Each driver would have one lap to set a time. During the first round, the top 20 drivers in the round would be guaranteed a starting spot in the race. If a driver was not able to guarantee a spot in the first round, they had the option to scrub their time from the first round and try and run a faster lap time in a second round qualifying run, held on Thursday, October 8, at 1:30 PM EST. As with the first round, each driver would have one lap to set a time. For this specific race, positions 21-40 would be decided on time, and depending on who needed it, a select amount of positions were given to cars who had not otherwise qualified but were high enough in owner's points; up to two were given. If needed, a past champion who did not qualify on either time or provisionals could use a champion's provisional, adding one more spot to the field.

Alan Kulwicki, driving for his own AK Racing team, won the pole, setting a time of 30.163 and an average speed of 179.027 mph (288.116 km/h) in the first round.

Five drivers would fail to qualify.

=== Full qualifying results ===
Pos.	#	Driver	Team	Make	Time	Speed
1	7	Alan Kulwicki	AK Racing	Ford	30.163	179.027
2	25	Ken Schrader	Hendrick Motorsports	Chevrolet	30.204	178.784
3	4	Ernie Irvan	Morgan–McClure Motorsports	Chevrolet	30.429	177.462
4	6	Mark Martin	Roush Racing	Ford	30.438	177.410
5	5	Ricky Rudd	Hendrick Motorsports	Chevrolet	30.578	176.598
6	21	Morgan Shepherd	Wood Brothers Racing	Ford	30.590	176.528
7	18	Dale Jarrett	Joe Gibbs Racing	Chevrolet	30.623	176.338
8	26	Brett Bodine	King Racing	Ford	30.657	176.142
9	66	Jimmy Hensley (R)	Cale Yarborough Motorsports	Ford	30.673	176.051
10	17	Darrell Waltrip	Darrell Waltrip Motorsports	Chevrolet	30.703	175.879
11	3	Dale Earnhardt	Richard Childress Racing	Chevrolet	30.742	175.655
12	15	Geoff Bodine	Bud Moore Engineering	Ford	30.749	175.615
13	94	Terry Labonte	Hagan Racing	Chevrolet	30.772	175.484
14	10	Derrike Cope	Whitcomb Racing	Chevrolet	30.777	175.456
15	83	Lake Speed	Speed Racing	Ford	30.780	175.439
16	11	Bill Elliott	Junior Johnson & Associates	Ford	30.789	175.387
17	8	Dick Trickle	Stavola Brothers Racing	Ford	30.799	175.330
18	33	Harry Gant	Leo Jackson Motorsports	Oldsmobile	30.821	175.205
19	22	Sterling Marlin	Junior Johnson & Associates	Ford	30.878	174.882
20	42	Kyle Petty	SABCO Racing	Pontiac	30.885	174.842
Failed to lock in Round 1
21	2	Rusty Wallace	Penske Racing South	Pontiac	30.924	174.622
22	28	Davey Allison	Robert Yates Racing	Ford	30.964	174.396
23	1	Rick Mast	Precision Products Racing	Oldsmobile	30.964	174.396
24	12	Jimmy Spencer	Bobby Allison Motorsports	Ford	30.992	174.239
25	9	Chad Little	Melling Racing	Ford	31.019	174.087
26	68	Bobby Hamilton	TriStar Motorsports	Ford	31.079	173.751
27	97	Hut Stricklin	Junior Johnson & Associates	Ford	31.130	173.466
28	31	Bobby Hillin Jr.	Team Ireland	Chevrolet	31.138	173.422
29	30	Michael Waltrip	Bahari Racing	Pontiac	31.166	173.266
30	55	Ted Musgrave	RaDiUs Motorsports	Ford	31.177	173.205
31	90	Pancho Carter	Donlavey Racing	Ford	31.275	172.662
32	43	Richard Petty	Petty Enterprises	Pontiac	31.283	172.618
33	45	Rich Bickle	Terminal Trucking Motorsports	Ford	31.626	172.381
34	65	Jerry O'Neil	Aroneck Racing	Oldsmobile	31.371	172.133
35	16	Wally Dallenbach Jr.	Roush Racing	Ford	31.468	171.603
36	49	Stanley Smith	BS&S Motorsports	Chevrolet	31.514	171.352
37	57	Bob Schacht (R)	Stringer Motorsports	Oldsmobile	31.556	171.124
38	52	Jimmy Means	Jimmy Means Racing	Pontiac	31.582	170.983
39	71	Jim Sauter	Marcis Auto Racing	Chevrolet	31.591	170.935
40	41	Dave Marcis	Larry Hedrick Motorsports	Chevrolet	31.645	170.643
Failed to qualify
41	77	Mike Potter	Balough Racing	Buick	-*	-*
42	05	Ed Ferree	Ferree Racing	Chevrolet	-*	-*
43	85	Mike Skinner	Mansion Motorsports	Chevrolet	-*	-*
44	82	Mark Stahl	Stahl Racing	Ford	-*	-*
45	48	James Hylton	Hylton Motorsports	Pontiac	-*	-*
Official first round qualifying results
Official starting lineup

== Race results ==
Fin	St	#	Driver	Team	Make	Laps	Led	Status	Pts	Winnings
1	4	6	Mark Martin	Roush Racing	Ford	334	107	running	180	$101,500
2	1	7	Alan Kulwicki	AK Racing	Ford	334	63	running	175	$89,000
3	20	42	Kyle Petty	SABCO Racing	Pontiac	334	129	running	175	$68,600
4	24	12	Jimmy Spencer	Bobby Allison Motorsports	Ford	334	0	running	160	$41,200
5	5	5	Ricky Rudd	Hendrick Motorsports	Chevrolet	334	0	running	155	$35,550
6	3	4	Ernie Irvan	Morgan–McClure Motorsports	Chevrolet	334	2	running	155	$34,150
7	2	25	Ken Schrader	Hendrick Motorsports	Chevrolet	334	13	running	151	$32,500
8	18	33	Harry Gant	Leo Jackson Motorsports	Oldsmobile	334	8	running	147	$25,800
9	17	8	Dick Trickle	Stavola Brothers Racing	Ford	333	2	running	143	$19,300
10	12	15	Geoff Bodine	Bud Moore Engineering	Ford	333	0	running	134	$19,600
11	30	55	Ted Musgrave	RaDiUs Motorsports	Ford	333	0	running	130	$16,200
12	13	94	Terry Labonte	Hagan Racing	Chevrolet	333	0	running	127	$15,000
13	6	21	Morgan Shepherd	Wood Brothers Racing	Ford	333	0	running	124	$14,700
14	11	3	Dale Earnhardt	Richard Childress Racing	Chevrolet	332	0	running	121	$19,050
15	26	68	Bobby Hamilton	TriStar Motorsports	Ford	331	0	running	118	$13,450
16	19	22	Sterling Marlin	Junior Johnson & Associates	Ford	331	0	running	115	$11,350
17	14	10	Derrike Cope	Whitcomb Racing	Chevrolet	331	0	running	112	$16,100
18	9	66	Jimmy Hensley (R)	Cale Yarborough Motorsports	Ford	330	0	running	109	$8,450
19	22	28	Davey Allison	Robert Yates Racing	Ford	329	0	running	106	$15,375
20	35	16	Wally Dallenbach Jr.	Roush Racing	Ford	328	0	running	103	$7,550
21	39	71	Jim Sauter	Marcis Auto Racing	Chevrolet	326	0	running	100	$6,595
22	37	57	Bob Schacht (R)	Stringer Motorsports	Oldsmobile	325	0	running	97	$4,700
23	29	30	Michael Waltrip	Bahari Racing	Pontiac	325	0	running	94	$9,220
24	7	18	Dale Jarrett	Joe Gibbs Racing	Chevrolet	324	0	clutch	91	$9,640
25	33	45	Rich Bickle	Terminal Trucking Motorsports	Ford	324	0	running	88	$4,830
26	15	83	Lake Speed	Speed Racing	Ford	323	0	clutch	85	$4,235
27	32	43	Richard Petty	Petty Enterprises	Pontiac	323	0	running	82	$8,720
28	8	26	Brett Bodine	King Racing	Ford	320	0	running	79	$9,105
29	34	65	Jerry O'Neil	Aroneck Racing	Oldsmobile	314	0	running	76	$3,965
30	16	11	Bill Elliott	Junior Johnson & Associates	Ford	310	10	sway bar	78	$13,880
31	27	97	Hut Stricklin	Junior Johnson & Associates	Ford	305	0	quit	70	$3,800
32	31	90	Pancho Carter	Donlavey Racing	Ford	297	0	running	67	$3,735
33	25	9	Chad Little	Melling Racing	Ford	294	0	overheating	64	$3,670
34	10	17	Darrell Waltrip	Darrell Waltrip Motorsports	Chevrolet	215	0	engine	61	$13,350
35	23	1	Rick Mast	Precision Products Racing	Oldsmobile	168	0	engine	58	$8,155
36	36	49	Stanley Smith	BS&S Motorsports	Chevrolet	141	0	engine	55	$3,610
37	21	2	Rusty Wallace	Penske Racing South	Pontiac	128	0	engine	52	$11,600
38	38	52	Jimmy Means	Jimmy Means Racing	Pontiac	89	0	engine	49	$3,590
39	40	41	Dave Marcis	Larry Hedrick Motorsports	Chevrolet	57	0	rear end	46	$5,085
DSQ	28	31	Bobby Hillin Jr.	Team Ireland	Chevrolet	332	0	disqualified	43	$3,580
Official race results

== Standings after the race ==
Drivers' Championship standings

	Pos	Driver	Points
	1	Bill Elliott	3,653
	2	Davey Allison	3,614 (-39)
	3	Alan Kulwicki	3,606 (-47)
1	4	Mark Martin	3,562 (–91)
1	5	Harry Gant	3,555 (–98)
	6	Kyle Petty	3,539 (–114)
	7	Ricky Rudd	3,409 (–244)
	8	Darrell Waltrip	3,303 (–350)
3	9	Ernie Irvan	3,263 (–390)
	10	Terry Labonte	3,261 (–392)
Official driver's standings

- Note: Only the first 10 positions are included for the driver standings.

Previous race: 1992 Tyson Holly Farms 400	NASCAR Winston Cup Series; 1992 season	Next race: 1992 AC Delco 500
