= 1992 Tyson Holly Farms 400 =

25th race of the 1992 NASCAR Winston Cup Series

Race details
- Race 25 of 29 in the 1992 NASCAR Winston Cup Series
- The 1992 Tyson Holly Farms 400 program cover, featuring Dale Earnhardt.
- Date: October 5, 1992
- Official name: 43rd Annual Tyson Holly Farms 400
- Location: North Wilkesboro Speedway, North Wilkesboro, North Carolina
- Course: Permanent racing facility
- Course length: 1.006 km (0.625 miles)
- Distance: 400 laps, 250 mi (402.336 km)
- Scheduled distance: 400 laps, 250 mi (402.336 km)
- Average speed: 107.36 miles per hour (172.78 km/h)

Pole position
Driver	Alan Kulwicki	AK Racing
- Time: 19.209

Most laps led
Driver	Geoff Bodine	Bud Moore Engineering
- Laps: 181

Winner
No. 15	Geoff Bodine	Bud Moore Engineering

Television in the United States
- Network: ESPN
- Announcers: Bob Jenkins, Ned Jarrett, Benny Parsons

Radio in the United States
- Radio: Motor Racing Network

The 1992 Tyson Holly Farms 400 was the 25th stock car race of the 1992 NASCAR Winston Cup Series season and the 43rd iteration of the event. The race was originally scheduled to be held on Sunday, October 4, 1992, but was delayed to Monday, October 5 due to rain. The race was held in North Wilkesboro, North Carolina at the North Wilkesboro Speedway, a 0.625 miles (1.006 km) oval short track. The race took the scheduled 400 laps to complete. At the race's end, Bud Moore Engineering driver Geoff Bodine would manage to dominate a majority of the race to take his 14th career NASCAR Winston Cup Series victory and his second and final victory of the season. To fill out the top three, Roush Racing driver Mark Martin and SABCO Racing driver Kyle Petty would finish second and third, respectively.

== Background ==
The layout of North Wilkesboro Speedway, the venue where the race was held.

North Wilkesboro Speedway is a short oval racetrack located on U.S. Route 421, about five miles east of the town of North Wilkesboro, North Carolina, or 80 miles north of Charlotte. It measures 0.625 mi (1.006 km) and features a unique uphill backstretch and downhill frontstretch. It has previously held races in NASCAR's top three series, including 93 Winston Cup Series races. The track, a NASCAR original, operated from 1949, NASCAR's inception, until the track's original closure in 1996. The speedway briefly reopened in 2010 and hosted several stock car series races before closing again in the spring of 2011. It was re-opened in August 2022 for grassroots racing.

=== Entry list ===
- (R) denotes rookie driver.

#	Driver	Team	Make	Sponsor
1	Rick Mast	Precision Products Racing	Oldsmobile	Skoal
2	Rusty Wallace	Penske Racing South	Pontiac	Miller Genuine Draft
3	Dale Earnhardt	Richard Childress Racing	Chevrolet	GM Goodwrench Service Plus
4	Ernie Irvan	Morgan–McClure Motorsports	Chevrolet	Kodak
5	Ricky Rudd	Hendrick Motorsports	Chevrolet	Tide
6	Mark Martin	Roush Racing	Ford	Valvoline
7	Alan Kulwicki	AK Racing	Ford	Hooters
8	Dick Trickle	Stavola Brothers Racing	Ford	Snickers
10	Derrike Cope	Whitcomb Racing	Chevrolet	Purolator Filters
11	Bill Elliott	Junior Johnson & Associates	Ford	Budweiser
12	Jeff Purvis	Bobby Allison Motorsports	Chevrolet	Raybestos
15	Geoff Bodine	Bud Moore Engineering	Ford	Motorcraft
16	Wally Dallenbach Jr.	Roush Racing	Ford	Keystone
17	Darrell Waltrip	Darrell Waltrip Motorsports	Chevrolet	Western Auto
18	Dale Jarrett	Joe Gibbs Racing	Chevrolet	Interstate Batteries
21	Morgan Shepherd	Wood Brothers Racing	Ford	Citgo
22	Sterling Marlin	Junior Johnson & Associates	Ford	Maxwell House
25	Ken Schrader	Hendrick Motorsports	Chevrolet	Kodiak
26	Brett Bodine	King Racing	Ford	Quaker State
28	Davey Allison	Robert Yates Racing	Ford	Texaco, Havoline
30	Michael Waltrip	Bahari Racing	Pontiac	Pennzoil
33	Harry Gant	Leo Jackson Motorsports	Oldsmobile	Skoal Bandit
41	Dick Trickle	Larry Hedrick Motorsports	Chevrolet	Kellogg's Frosted Flakes
42	Kyle Petty	SABCO Racing	Pontiac	Mello Yello
43	Richard Petty	Petty Enterprises	Pontiac	STP
45	Rich Bickle	Terminal Trucking Motorsports	Ford	Terminal Trucking
52	Jimmy Means	Jimmy Means Racing	Pontiac	Hurley Limo
55	Ted Musgrave	RaDiUs Motorsports	Ford	Jasper Engines & Transmissions
66	Jimmy Hensley (R)	Cale Yarborough Motorsports	Ford	Phillips 66 TropArtic
68	Bobby Hamilton	TriStar Motorsports	Ford	Country Time
71	Jim Sauter	Marcis Auto Racing	Chevrolet	Staley's Steakhouse
90	Hut Stricklin	Donlavey Racing	Ford	Norton's Yacht Sales
94	Terry Labonte	Hagan Racing	Oldsmobile	Sunoco

== Qualifying ==
Qualifying was split into two rounds. The first round was held on Friday, October 2, at 3:00 PM EST. Each driver would have one lap to set a time. During the first round, the top 15 drivers in the round would be guaranteed a starting spot in the race. If a driver was not able to guarantee a spot in the first round, they had the option to scrub their time from the first round and try and run a faster lap time in a second round qualifying run, held on Saturday, October 3, at 11:00 AM EST. As with the first round, each driver would have one lap to set a time. For this specific race, positions 16-30 would be decided on time, and depending on who needed it, a select amount of positions were given to cars who had not otherwise qualified but were high enough in owner's points; up to two were given. If needed, a past champion who did not qualify on either time or provisionals could use a champion's provisional, adding one more spot to the field.

Alan Kulwicki, driving for his own AK Racing team, would win the pole, setting a time of 19.209 and an average speed of 117.133 miles per hour (188.507 km/h) in the first round.

Jimmy Means was the only driver to fail to qualify.

=== Full qualifying results ===
Pos.	#	Driver	Team	Make	Time	Speed
1	7	Alan Kulwicki	AK Racing	Ford	19.209	117.133
2	2	Rusty Wallace	Penske Racing South	Pontiac	19.251	116.877
3	15	Geoff Bodine	Bud Moore Engineering	Ford	19.305	116.550
4	42	Kyle Petty	SABCO Racing	Pontiac	19.335	116.369
5	5	Ricky Rudd	Hendrick Motorsports	Chevrolet	19.343	116.321
6	22	Sterling Marlin	Junior Johnson & Associates	Ford	19.345	116.309
7	94	Terry Labonte	Hagan Racing	Oldsmobile	19.352	116.267
8	4	Ernie Irvan	Morgan–McClure Motorsports	Chevrolet	19.360	116.219
9	21	Morgan Shepherd	Wood Brothers Racing	Ford	19.381	116.093
10	18	Dale Jarrett	Joe Gibbs Racing	Chevrolet	19.387	116.057
11	26	Brett Bodine	King Racing	Ford	19.390	116.039
12	8	Dick Trickle	Stavola Brothers Racing	Ford	19.395	116.009
13	3	Dale Earnhardt	Richard Childress Racing	Chevrolet	19.408	115.932
14	28	Davey Allison	Robert Yates Racing	Ford	19.438	115.753
15	11	Bill Elliott	Junior Johnson & Associates	Ford	19.447	115.699
Failed to lock in Round 1
16	6	Mark Martin	Roush Racing	Ford	19.459	115.628
17	17	Darrell Waltrip	Darrell Waltrip Motorsports	Chevrolet	19.470	115.562
18	25	Ken Schrader	Hendrick Motorsports	Chevrolet	19.480	115.503
19	1	Rick Mast	Precision Products Racing	Oldsmobile	19.502	115.373
20	66	Jimmy Hensley (R)	Cale Yarborough Motorsports	Ford	19.529	115.213
21	43	Richard Petty	Petty Enterprises	Pontiac	19.566	114.995
22	45	Rich Bickle	Terminal Trucking Motorsports	Ford	19.569	114.978
23	30	Michael Waltrip	Bahari Racing	Pontiac	19.570	114.972
24	68	Bobby Hamilton	TriStar Motorsports	Ford	19.591	114.849
25	55	Ted Musgrave	RaDiUs Motorsports	Ford	19.594	114.831
26	10	Derrike Cope	Whitcomb Racing	Chevrolet	19.603	114.778
27	16	Wally Dallenbach Jr.	Roush Racing	Ford	19.622	114.667
28	33	Harry Gant	Leo Jackson Motorsports	Oldsmobile	19.670	114.387
29	41	Dave Marcis	Larry Hedrick Motorsports	Chevrolet	19.672	114.376
30	90	Hut Stricklin	Donlavey Racing	Ford	19.768	113.820
Provisionals
31	12	Jeff Purvis	Bobby Allison Motorsports	Chevrolet	-*	-*
32	71	Jim Sauter	Marcis Auto Racing	Chevrolet	-*	-*
Failed to qualify
33	52	Jimmy Means	Jimmy Means Racing	Pontiac	-*	-*
Official first round qualifying results
Official starting lineup

== Race results ==
Fin	St	#	Driver	Team	Make	Laps	Led	Status	Pts	Winnings
1	3	15	Geoff Bodine	Bud Moore Engineering	Ford	400	312	running	185	$71,625
2	16	6	Mark Martin	Roush Racing	Ford	400	2	running	175	$36,475
3	4	42	Kyle Petty	SABCO Racing	Pontiac	399	34	running	170	$20,325
4	2	2	Rusty Wallace	Penske Racing South	Pontiac	399	14	running	165	$18,600
5	6	22	Sterling Marlin	Junior Johnson & Associates	Ford	399	1	running	160	$20,000
6	8	4	Ernie Irvan	Morgan–McClure Motorsports	Chevrolet	399	0	running	150	$19,175
7	11	26	Brett Bodine	King Racing	Ford	398	0	running	146	$13,780
8	7	94	Terry Labonte	Hagan Racing	Oldsmobile	398	0	running	142	$11,225
9	17	17	Darrell Waltrip	Darrell Waltrip Motorsports	Chevrolet	397	3	running	143	$14,350
10	10	18	Dale Jarrett	Joe Gibbs Racing	Chevrolet	397	0	running	134	$12,755
11	14	28	Davey Allison	Robert Yates Racing	Ford	397	0	running	130	$14,875
12	1	7	Alan Kulwicki	AK Racing	Ford	397	34	running	132	$18,950
13	28	33	Harry Gant	Leo Jackson Motorsports	Oldsmobile	397	0	running	124	$14,300
14	25	55	Ted Musgrave	RaDiUs Motorsports	Ford	397	0	running	121	$9,850
15	5	5	Ricky Rudd	Hendrick Motorsports	Chevrolet	396	0	running	118	$12,275
16	23	30	Michael Waltrip	Bahari Racing	Pontiac	396	0	running	115	$9,450
17	9	21	Morgan Shepherd	Wood Brothers Racing	Ford	396	0	running	112	$9,100
18	12	8	Dick Trickle	Stavola Brothers Racing	Ford	396	0	running	109	$5,825
19	13	3	Dale Earnhardt	Richard Childress Racing	Chevrolet	395	0	running	106	$15,350
20	22	45	Rich Bickle	Terminal Trucking Motorsports	Ford	395	0	running	103	$4,450
21	19	1	Rick Mast	Precision Products Racing	Oldsmobile	395	0	running	100	$8,550
22	26	10	Derrike Cope	Whitcomb Racing	Chevrolet	394	0	running	97	$5,450
23	18	25	Ken Schrader	Hendrick Motorsports	Chevrolet	394	0	running	94	$12,450
24	27	16	Wally Dallenbach Jr.	Roush Racing	Ford	393	0	running	91	$5,150
25	20	66	Jimmy Hensley (R)	Cale Yarborough Motorsports	Ford	392	0	running	88	$4,750
26	15	11	Bill Elliott	Junior Johnson & Associates	Ford	392	0	running	85	$11,300
27	21	43	Richard Petty	Petty Enterprises	Pontiac	390	0	running	82	$7,825
28	29	41	Dave Marcis	Larry Hedrick Motorsports	Chevrolet	388	0	running	79	$4,735
29	32	71	Jim Sauter	Marcis Auto Racing	Chevrolet	386	0	running	76	$4,700
30	30	90	Hut Stricklin	Donlavey Racing	Ford	384	0	running	73	$5,100
31	24	68	Bobby Hamilton	TriStar Motorsports	Ford	383	0	running	70	$8,625
32	31	12	Jeff Purvis	Bobby Allison Motorsports	Chevrolet	35	0	engine	67	$8,500
Failed to qualify
33		52	Jimmy Means	Jimmy Means Racing	Pontiac					
Official race results

== Standings after the race ==
Drivers' Championship standings

	Pos	Driver	Points
	1	Bill Elliott	3,575
	2	Davey Allison	3,508 (-67)
	3	Alan Kulwicki	3,431 (-144)
	4	Harry Gant	3,408 (–167)
	5	Mark Martin	3,382 (–193)
	6	Kyle Petty	3,364 (–211)
	7	Ricky Rudd	3,254 (–321)
	8	Darrell Waltrip	3,242 (–333)
1	9	Rusty Wallace	3,165 (–410)
1	10	Terry Labonte	3,134 (–441)
Official driver's standings

- Note: Only the first 10 positions are included for the driver standings.

Previous race: 1992 Goody's 500	NASCAR Winston Cup Series; 1992 season	Next race: 1992 Mello Yello 500
